= Tekken Tag Tournament 2 =

2011 fighting video game

- Cover artwork for the console version, featuring Heihachi Mishima and Jin Kazama
- Developer: Namco Bandai Games
- Publisher: Namco Bandai Games (Note: Released under the Namco label)
- Director: Yuichi Yonemori
- Producer: Katsuhiro Harada
- Composer: See music section
- Series: Tekken
- Platforms: Arcade, PlayStation 3, Xbox 360, Wii U
- Release: Arcade: JP: September 14, 2011; JP: March 27, 2012 (Unlimited); PlayStation 3, Xbox 360: NA: September 11, 2012; JP/AU: September 13, 2012; EU: September 14, 2012; Wii U: NA: November 18, 2012; EU/AU: November 30, 2012; JP: December 8, 2012
- Genre: Fighting
- Modes: Single-player, multiplayer
- Arcade system: Namco System 369

Tekken Tag Tournament 2 is a 2011 fighting game developed and published by Namco Bandai Games. Part of the Tekken series, it is the sequel to Tekken Tag Tournament (1999). The game debuted in Japanese arcades in September 2011 and received the Unlimited update in March 2012. Expanded versions were released for the PlayStation 3 and Xbox 360 in September 2012, followed by Tekken Tag Tournament 2: Wii U Edition in November and December 2012.

The game expands the original's two-character team battles with new tag combinations, solo-versus-team matches and a four-player Pair Play mode. The home versions add the Fight Lab tutorial, additional characters and customization options; the final playable roster contains 59 characters. The Wii U edition adds Nintendo-themed costumes, Mushroom Battle and the returning Tekken Ball minigame.

Tekken Tag Tournament 2 received generally favorable reviews, with critics praising its combat system, large roster and online play while noting its demanding learning curve. Namco Bandai reported sales of 1.5 million copies across the three home-console versions for the fiscal year ended March 2013.

== Gameplay ==
Tag Assaults allow both members of a team to participate in a combo.

In a standard tag match, each player selects two fighters and can switch between them during play. A team loses the round when either member's health is depleted. A fighter who is not currently active can recover part of the damage received, making the timing of a tag part of the match strategy.

The combat system distinguishes between Tag Combos, in which a player switches to a partner during a combo, and Tag Assaults, in which the partner joins an attack before the original fighter continues. It retains the Bound mechanic from Tekken 6, which bounces an airborne opponent off the ground to extend a combo. Certain arenas also have breakable walls or floors. Harada described the recovery gauge and the timing of partner attacks as constraints intended to give tag combinations a strategic cost.

Unlimited and the home-console versions support two-on-two, one-on-one and one-on-two matches. Pair Play allows up to four people to participate, with each player controlling one member of a two-fighter team.

The console versions include Arcade Battle, Ghost Battle, Versus Battle, Team Battle, Time Attack, Survival and Practice modes. Fight Lab is a separate tutorial built around Violet and Combot. Its challenges teach movement, attacks and defensive techniques while allowing players to customize Combot's appearance and move set.

The Wii U Edition adds Wii U GamePad touch-screen shortcuts and Off-TV Play. Its exclusive Mushroom Battle mode uses power-ups inspired by Super Mario, while Tekken Ball returns from Tekken 3. The edition also includes costumes based on Nintendo characters, including Mario, Link, Samus Aran and Captain Falcon.

== Characters ==
The arcade version has 44 playable characters. It brings back Jun Kazama, Jinpachi Mishima and True Ogre, while Julia Chang appears under the masked wrestling persona Jaycee. Kazuya Mishima can transform into Devil Kazuya during a match; the transformation is not a separate character-selection slot. Unknown appears as the arcade game's final boss and became playable in the home versions.

The home-console roster reaches 59 playable characters after the free character releases. Console additions include returning fighters such as Kunimitsu, Michelle Chang, Dr. Bosconovitch, Forest Law and Combot, as well as Sebastian and Slim Bob. The four pre-order fighters and the final three additional characters were made available to all PS3 and Xbox 360 players without charge in November 2012.

=== New characters ===
- Jaycee: A luchador fighter and Julia Chang's alter-ego.
- Sebastian ^{b}: Lili's old butler, who usually appeared in Lili's endings since their debut in Tekken 5: Dark Resurrection.
- Slim Bob ^{b}: A slim version of Bob, who first appeared in Bob's Tekken 6 ending.

=== Recurring characters ===
- Alex ^{a}
- Alisa Bosconovitch
- Ancient Ogre ^{b}
- Angel ^{b}
- Anna Williams
- Armor King II
- Asuka Kazama
- Baek Doo San
- Bob Richards
- Bruce Irvin
- Bryan Fury
- Christie Monteiro
- Combot ^{a} ^{c}
- Craig Marduk
- Devil Jin
- Dr. Bosconovitch ^{b}
- Eddy Gordo
- Feng Wei
- Forest Law ^{a}
- Ganryu
- Heihachi Mishima
- Hwoarang
- JACK-6
- Jin Kazama
- Jinpachi Mishima
- Jun Kazama
- Kazuya Mishima / Devil Kazuya ^{e}
- King II
- Kuma II
- Kunimitsu ^{b}
- Lars Alexandersson
- Lee Chaolan
- Lei Wulong
- Leo Kliesen
- Lili De Rochefort
- Ling Xiaoyu
- Marshall Law
- Michelle Chang ^{b}
- Miguel Caballero Rojo
- Miharu Hirano ^{b}
- Mokujin
- Nina Williams
- Panda
- Paul Phoenix
- Prototype Jack ^{a}
- Raven
- Roger Jr.
- Sergei Dragunov
- Steve Fox
- Tiger Jackson ^{a}
- True Ogre
- Unknown ^{b} ^{d} ^{f}
- Violet ^{b}
- Wang Jinrei
- Yoshimitsu
- Zafina

^a Additional character in the home-console versions
^b Free character release for PS3 and Xbox 360; included in the Wii U edition
^c Unavailable in online play
^d Unplayable in arcade version
^e In-battle transformation
^f Unlockable in Wii U version

== Development ==
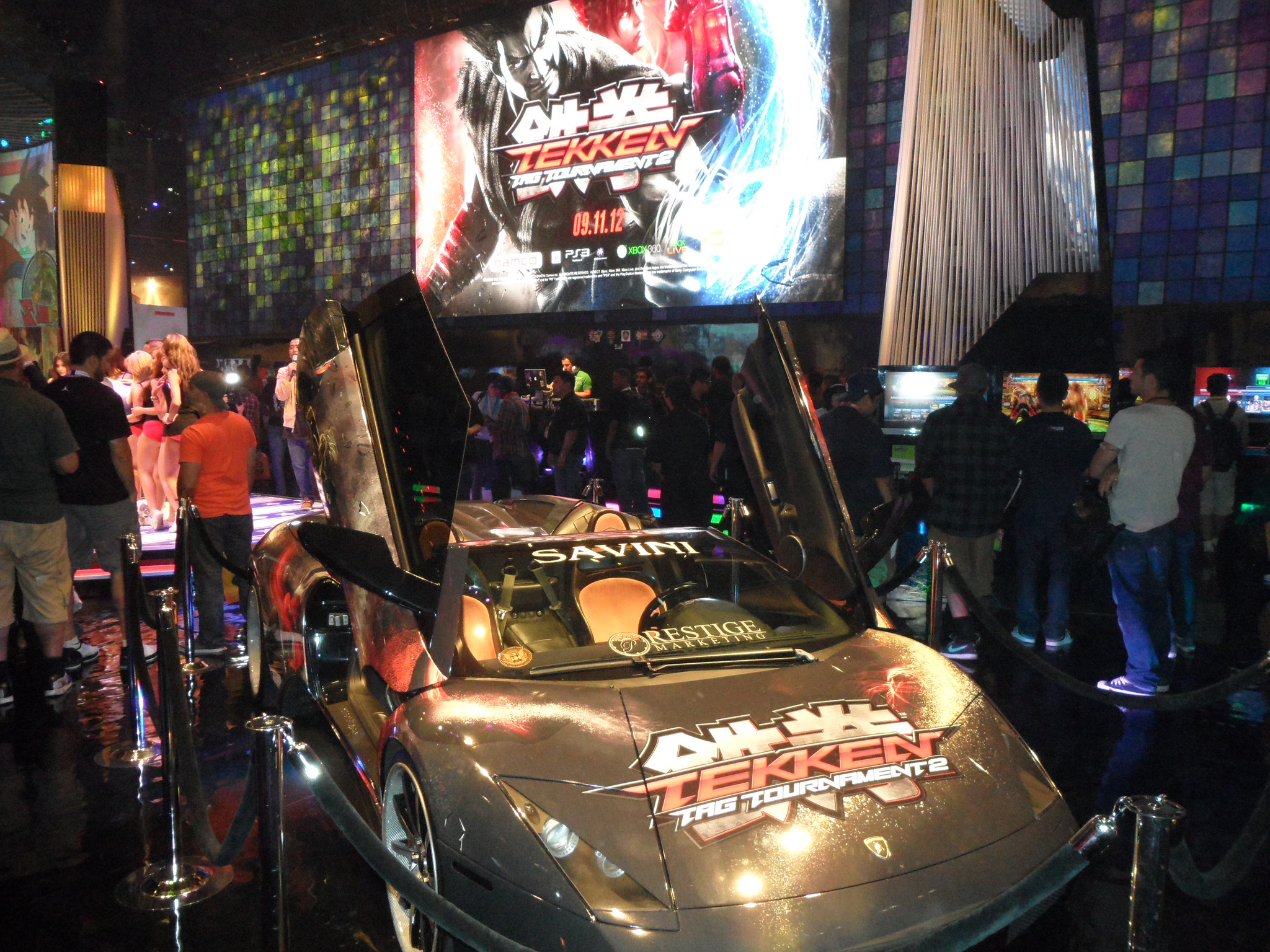
Tag Tournament 2 exposition at the Electronic Entertainment Expo 2012

Tekken series producer Katsuhiro Harada teased an announcement on his Twitter feed on September 17, 2010 ("TGS Sep 18(Sat) at Tougeki Booth. I'll announce something :D"). It was rumored to be something related to Tekken X Street Fighter or Tekken 7. The game was announced to be Tekken Tag Tournament 2, sequel to Tekken Tag Tournament, on September 18, 2010, at the Tougeki event as promised. Producer Katsuhiro Harada stated that the game engine would be different from the one used in Tekken 6. The release of the arcade version of the game in Japan was originally planned for summer 2011, but due to complications derived from the Great East Japan earthquake, the arcade release was postponed until Autumn 2011.

In a 2012 interview, producer Katsuhiro Harada and director Yuichi Yonemori described Unlimited as an effort to broaden the game beyond its original tag format. The home version added the Fight Lab tutorial and more offline content, while preserving the arcade game's competitive systems.

=== Tekken Tag Tournament 2 Unlimited ===
Tekken Tag Tournament 2 Unlimited is the expanded arcade version, released in Japan on March 27, 2012. It introduces solo-versus-solo and solo-versus-tag formats alongside conventional tag battles, with balance adjustments for the different match types. The PS3 and Xbox 360 editions were developed from this version.

=== Console versions ===
The console version of Tekken Tag Tournament 2 was released for the PlayStation 3 and Xbox 360 in September 2012, and for the Wii U in November–December 2012. The console version is based on the Unlimited version, and features new characters in addition to the 44 already in the arcade version of the game, as well as new stages and a new tutorial mode called "Fight Lab" featuring Combot. The "Fight Lab" mode serves as a training ground for both beginners and advanced players with customizable bots.

Both the PlayStation 3 and Xbox 360 versions of Tekken Tag Tournament 2 support stereoscopic 3D, the effects of which can be customized. "Tekken Tunes" allows players to change the in-game soundtrack and import their own music. Additionally, the release was accompanied by an online service called "World Tekken Federation" that allowed players to keep track of their overall stats and even which moves they had used in a match. The service supported teams, online competitions, forums and a worldwide leaderboard.

A digital version of Tekken Tag Tournament 2 was released on the PlayStation Network in North America on November 13, 2012, and was released in Europe on November 21, 2012. A version for Xbox Live followed in December.

The Wii U Edition features exclusive content, including a game mode that uses power-ups from Nintendo's Super Mario series, such as Mega Mushrooms and Poison Mushrooms, the return of the minigame "Tekken Ball" from Tekken 3, an optional touch-based control scheme utilizing the Wii U GamePad controller, and character costumes based on popular Nintendo series, including Super Mario, Metroid, Star Fox, F-Zero and The Legend of Zelda. In addition to the exclusive content, the additional characters, outfits and stages released for the Xbox 360 and PlayStation 3 versions are included in the Wii U Edition; Unknown remains an unlockable character.

Originally, when the Wii U console was first shown at the E3 2011 in Los Angeles, Namco announced that they would develop a Tekken game for the Wii U, which was untitled at the time. However, at E3 2012, it was announced that Tekken Tag Tournament 2 would come to the Wii U, which was already going to come to the PlayStation 3 and Xbox 360. Tekken Tag Tournament 2: Wii U Edition is amongst the first third-party Wii U games that is available in both retail and as a downloadable format for the Nintendo eShop. In Japan, the downloadable version is available for a slightly lower price than the retail format.

=== Music ===
The arcade soundtrack was composed by Akitaka Tohyama, Taku Inoue, Go Shiina, Rio Hamamoto, Nobuyoshi Sano and Keiichi Okabe. Sweep Record released the two-disc Tekken Tag Tournament 2 Original Sound Track on November 17, 2011; it contains 28 game tracks and two extended versions. The additional music written for the home editions was later collected on Tekken Tag Tournament 2 Original Soundtrack Plus.

Snoop Dogg recorded "Knocc 'Em Down" for the game and appears in a themed arena. Harada said that the collaboration introduced hip-hop and rap to the series' musical range.

== Release ==
=== Versions and platforms ===
The following table lists the principal game versions and digital releases. Regional special packages and budget reissues are listed separately below.

Game versions and original release platforms
Version	System	Release	Features or format
Tekken Tag Tournament 2	Arcade — Namco System 369	September 14, 2011 (Japan)	Original arcade release.
Tekken Tag Tournament 2 Prologue	PlayStation 3	November 2011	Preview included in Tekken Hybrid, with characters and costumes based on Tekken: Blood Vengeance.
Tekken Tag Tournament 2 Unlimited	Arcade — Namco System 369	March 27, 2012 (Japan)	Expanded arcade version; basis of the home-console releases.
Tekken Tag Tournament 2 — retail	PlayStation 3	September 11, 2012 (North America); September 13 (Japan/Australia); September 14 (Europe)	Expanded home edition.
Tekken Tag Tournament 2 — retail	Xbox 360	September 11, 2012 (North America); September 13 (Japan/Australia); September 14 (Europe)	Expanded home edition.
Tekken Tag Tournament 2 — digital	PlayStation 3 — PlayStation Network	November 13, 2012 (North America/Japan); November 21 (Europe/Australia)	Download edition.
Tekken Tag Tournament 2 — Games on Demand	Xbox 360 — Xbox Live	December 2012	Download edition; release dates varied by region.
Tekken Tag Tournament 2: Wii U Edition	Wii U	November 18, 2012 (North America); November 30 (Europe/Australia); December 8 (Japan)	Nintendo costumes, Mushroom Battle, Tekken Ball and GamePad features; additional console content included.

=== Later compatibility and streaming ===
Compatibility and historical streaming access
Game version	System or service	Availability	Type of access
Xbox 360 edition	Xbox One	March 23, 2016	Backward compatibility; uses the Xbox 360 game.
Xbox 360 edition	Xbox Series X / Xbox Series S	Supported through backward compatibility	Microsoft's store lists Xbox One, Xbox Series X and Xbox Series S as compatible systems.
PlayStation 3 edition	PlayStation 4 — PlayStation Now	Added January 4, 2017	Cloud streaming of the PS3 edition; historical service availability.

The Wii U Edition was sold both on disc and through Nintendo eShop. New Wii U eShop purchases ended on March 27, 2023. Nintendo discontinued online play for Wii U software in April 2024, while offline modes remained usable.

=== Marketing ===
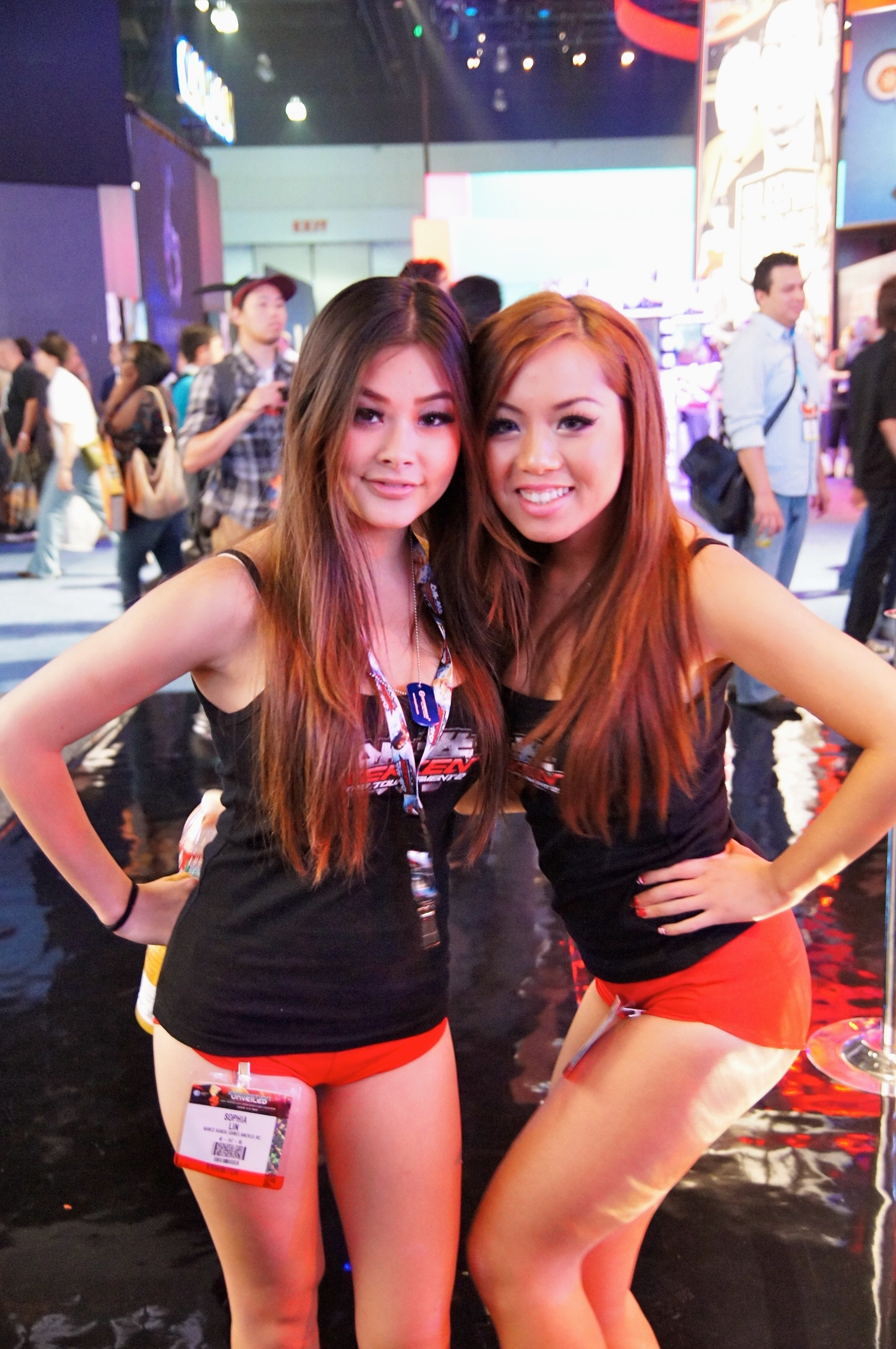
Promotion at the E3 2012

The Tekken Hybrid Blu-ray Disc collection, released in North America on November 22, 2011, contains the Tekken: Blood Vengeance CGI animated film and an HD version of the original Tekken Tag Tournament, as well as a demo version of Tekken Tag Tournament 2, called Tekken Tag Tournament 2 Prologue for the PlayStation 3. The preview draws on the film and features four characters: Alisa Bosconovitch, Devil Jin, Devil Kazuya and Ling Xiaoyu, all of whom feature new costumes (the school uniform for Alisa and Xiaoyu, and the new Devil design from the movie for Devil Jin and Devil Kazuya).

Prior to the release of Tekken Tag Tournament 2, Namco Bandai Games allowed players in North America for the first time to try the game at the Team Mad Catz booth during the 2012 MLG Winter Championships event. Namco brought Tekken Tag Tournament 2 arcade machines to MCM London Comic Con. On June 25, 2012, Namco announced the First-Play Tour, a UK tour designed to let newcomers play the game's Fight Lab mode ahead of the game's release. The tour began at London Trocadero on June 28, and headed to Manchester on July 5 and Glasgow on July 6. On September 11, 2012, Namco attempted a new world record for "largest screen used in a videogame tournament". The attempt took place at Sydney's IMAX theatre.

To celebrate the launch of Tekken Tag Tournament 2, Namco launched a competition to find the best Tekken inspired images. The competition played on the "Tag" element of the game, with fans from around the globe being asked to use Instagram to tag photos with #WEARETEKKEN or #TTT2 that show what Tekken means to them. The favorite photos were selected to go on display at the East Gallery in London to celebrate the game's launch on September 14, 2012. One overall winner, picked by "We Are Tekken" artist Vince Ray, received a Tekken prize bundle including a We Are Tekken edition of the game, Kotobukiya's Yoshimitsu statue (limited to 500), a We are Tekken gamer shirt, Tekken Tag Tournament 2 bowling bag and Vince Ray's Anna Williams poster signed by Harada.

=== Retail packages and budget reissues ===
Special editions combine the standard game with regional packaging, physical extras or pre-order content. Budget editions repackage the existing console version.

Regional retail editions and reissues
Edition or package	System	Release or region	Contents or status
We Are Tekken Edition	PlayStation 3, Xbox 360	2012 — Europe and Australia	Metal case, art book, soundtrack and remix CDs, and a behind-the-scenes DVD.
ANZ Edition	PlayStation 3, Xbox 360	2012 — Australia/New Zealand	Limited metal-tin package with launch bonus content.
Prestige Edition	PlayStation 3, Xbox 360	2012 — Southeast Asia	Art book, soundtrack CDs, making-of DVD and other physical extras.
PlayStation 3 the Best	PlayStation 3	November 7, 2013 — Japan	Budget reissue, on disc and as a download.
Platinum Collection	Xbox 360	November 7, 2013 — Japan	Budget reissue.
Essentials	PlayStation 3	2013 — Europe	Budget reissue.

In the U.S., people that pre-ordered Tekken Tag 2 from GameStop would receive the downloadable content (DLC) for Angel and Kunimitsu as well as the bikini outfits, the Snoop Dogg stage and a 'girl power' poster of Nina and Anna Williams. In Australia, on day one of Tekken Tag Tournament 2's launch, customers that placed their pre-orders with selected retailers had access to the exclusive ANZ Edition, which includes a Metal Tin case with exclusive artwork, the additional four DLC characters, the "Snoop Dogg Stage" and over 150 in-game swimsuit outfits. The ANZ Edition is produced in limited quantities and was available through EB Games and JB Hifi in Australia and New Zealand.

In Southeast Asia, the Prestige Edition contains a 256-page art book, two soundtrack CDs containing the original tracks and remixes, a DVD with behind-the-scenes video "Making of TTT2", and a Tekken wall-sticker signed by producer Katsuhiro Harada, packaged in a black leather box. In addition, all Southeast Asian customers who pre-ordered the game early (standard or Prestige) got an interlocking code so that players can link their Tekken Tag Tournament 2 arcade and console progress together, alongside the additional four DLC characters, the "Snoop Dogg Stage" and over 150 in-game swimsuit outfits.

In Europe, UK retailer Game secured the right to sell the We are Tekken edition of the game, available for the PlayStation 3 and Xbox 360 versions of the game. The game comes packed in an exclusive metal case including the original soundtrack, an additional music CD with remixes, an art book with more than 200 pages, a behind the scenes video with series producer Katsuhiro Harada and other guests offering their best tips.

=== Downloadable content and updates ===
In April 2012, series producer Katsuhiro Harada stated that while no characters will be paid downloadable content (DLC), those who pre-order the game at select retailers will be able to play as one or more of the four DLC characters (Ancient Ogre, Angel, Kunimitsu and Michelle Chang) at launch, but only for a limited period of time before the content is made available for free to all players.

On June 5, 2012, at E3, Namco Bandai announced a partnership with American rapper Snoop Dogg for content for Tekken Tag Tournament 2. Snoop recorded an original song for the game, titled "Knocc 'Em Down", and makes a special appearance as a non-playable character in the "Snoop Dogg Stage" offered as a free pre-order bonus. On July 14, 2012, during Comic Con, Namco announced the "Big Bikini Bundle", which includes over 150 swimsuit outfits. The swimsuit DLC includes suits for all characters: male, female and animal. The "Big Bikini Bundle" was available as a pre-order bonus in addition to the "Snoop Dogg Stage" and additional early access to DLC characters.

New fighters and stages were distributed through free updates and timed unlocks. Some character data was already present on the discs, so the unlock dates do not necessarily mark a separate edition of the game. The final character release also ended the early-access period for the four pre-order fighters.

Major free character and stage updates
Update	Systems	Release	Content
Free content update	PlayStation 3, Xbox 360	October 9, 2012	Miharu Hirano, Sebastian and Slim Bob; four additional stages.
Final timed character unlock	PlayStation 3, Xbox 360	November 13, 2012	Dr. Bosconovitch, Unknown and Violet; Ancient Ogre, Angel, Michelle Chang and Kunimitsu made available to all players.

Music and ending movies from earlier Tekken games were also offered as downloadable content for the Tekken Tunes and Tekken Theater modes. Music from the original Tekken, Tekken 2, Tekken 3 and Tekken Tag Tournament were released on October 9, 2012, and music from Tekken 4, Tekken 5 and Tekken 6 was released on October 23, 2012. The ending movie packs from the former four games were released the same day.

== Reception ==
Reception

Aggregate scores
Aggregator	Score
GameRankings	(PS3) 82% (Wii U) 83% (360) 83%
Metacritic	(PS3) 82/100 (Wii U) 83/100 (X360) 83/100

Review scores
Publication	Score
Edge	7/10
Eurogamer	8/10
Famitsu	39/40
G4	4/5
Game Informer	8.5/10
GameSpot	8.5/10
GamesRadar+	4/5
GameTrailers	8.7/10
Giant Bomb	4/5
IGN	7.5/10
Joystiq	4.5/5

Awards
Publication	Award
Machinima.com	Best Fighting Game of E3 2012
Game Informer	Best Fighting
GameSpot	Fighting Game of the Year
Digital Trends	Best Fighting Game
Game Revolution	Best Fighting Game 2012

Tekken Tag Tournament 2 received generally favorable reviews. Metacritic assigned the PlayStation 3 version 82/100, the Xbox 360 version 83/100 and the Wii U edition 83/100. Famitsu awarded the PS3 and Xbox 360 versions 39/40.

Reviewers generally praised the range of characters and the depth of the tag system. GameSpot highlighted the combat, online play, Fight Lab and soundtrack customization, while criticizing the limited explanations of more advanced techniques. Eurogamer praised the expanded tag mechanics and improved online functionality but found the single-player offering less distinctive. IGN also praised the quantity of content while noting the difficulty facing newcomers. Game Informer emphasized the roster, tag system and online performance, and GameTrailers regarded it as the series' strongest entry in several years.

=== Sales ===
Namco Bandai reported 840,000 copies for Japan and Europe in the first half of its fiscal year ended March 2013. Its full-year financial report subsequently listed 1.5 million units across PlayStation 3, Xbox 360 and Wii U worldwide.

The game entered the UK all-formats sales chart at number two.

=== Records ===
On June 22, 2013, Guinness World Records recognized the game for having the most moves in a fighting video game. Its count was 5,978 moves across the 59-character roster, excluding sample combos and ten-hit combinations.

=== Awards ===
Tekken Tag Tournament 2 was one of the four games nominated at the 2012 Spike TV Video Game Awards in the category "Best Fighting Game", losing to Persona 4 Arena. GameSpot awarded Tekken Tag Tournament 2 "Fighting Game of 2012", During the 16th Annual D.I.C.E. Awards, the Academy of Interactive Arts & Sciences nominated Tekken Tag Tournament 2 for "Fighting Game of the Year", which was ultimately awarded to PlayStation All-Stars Battle Royale. Tekken Tag Tournament 2 was also nominated for "Fighting Game of the Year" by Igromania, losing to Dead or Alive 5.
