= Tekken 6 =

2007 video game

- Japanese arcade flyer of Tekken 6 featuring Kazuya Mishima, Jin Kazama, Leo Kliesen, Miguel Caballero Rojo and Zafina.
- Developer: Namco Bandai Games
- Publisher: Namco Bandai Games (Note: Released under the Namco label outside North America)
- Director: Yuichi Yonemori
- Producer: Katsuhiro Harada
- Composer: See music section
- Series: Tekken
- Platforms: Arcade; PlayStation 3; Xbox 360; PlayStation Portable
- Release: Arcade: JP: November 26, 2007; NA: March 4, 2008; WW: December 18, 2008 (BR); PlayStation 3 & Xbox 360: NA: October 27, 2009; JP: October 29, 2009; EU: October 30, 2009; AU: November 5, 2009; PlayStation Portable: NA: November 24, 2009; EU: December 11, 2009; AU: December 17, 2009; JP: January 16, 2010
- Genres: Fighting, beat 'em up
- Modes: Single-player, multiplayer
- Arcade system: Namco System 357

Tekken 6 (Japanese: 鉄拳6) is a 2007 fighting game developed and published by Namco Bandai Games. It is the sixth main and seventh overall installment in the Tekken franchise. It was released on arcades in November 2007 as the first game running on the PlayStation 3-based System 357 arcade board. A year later, the game received an update, subtitled Bloodline Rebellion; both versions also saw a limited release in North America. A home version based on the update was released for the PlayStation 3 and Xbox 360 in October 2009; this was the first time a main installment was produced for a non-Sony console. A port to the PlayStation Portable was also released shortly after.

The game was produced by Katsuhiro Harada, who aimed to give the fights a strategic style while remaining faithful to the previous games in the series. This was the first Tekken game with Harada as producer. He replaced the longtime producer Hajime Nakatani from the first game, where Harada started out as a voice actor and a part of the original arcade development team. While this version retains elements from the earlier games, Tekken 6 introduces a new Rage system that increases the strength of the player characters when their health gets low. It also features a beat 'em up mode focused on a soldier named Lars Alexandersson who leads a coup d'état along with his underlings. Losing his memory in an attack against Jin Kazama's Mishima Zaibatsu special forces, Lars goes on a journey with a robot named Alisa Bosconovitch to learn his identity, so that he will be able to recover the subject of his mission. In this campaign mode, the player can win items by completing missions and enhance different power areas of any characters they choose to control.

The game received generally positive reviews. Critics praised the visuals and the new fight mechanics but had mixed opinions about the handling of the Scenario Campaign. Nevertheless, the PSP port was also well-received for how faithful it was to the initial console versions. The game's sales have reached 5.6 million copies worldwide. It was later re-released with the spin-off Tekken Tag Tournament 2 and Soulcalibur V for the Xbox 360 and PlayStation 3. A sequel, Tekken 7, was released in 2015.

== Gameplay ==
Tekken 6 features bigger stages with more interactivity than its predecessors, including walls or floors that can be broken to reveal new fighting areas. The character customization feature has been enhanced, and certain items have implications in some aspects of the gameplay.

A new Rage system gives characters more damage per hit when their vitality is below a certain point. Once activated, a reddish energy aura appears around the character, and their health bar starts to flicker in red. The Rage aura can be customized with different colors and effects to appear like fire, electricity, and ice, among others. Another newly added gameplay feature is the "bound" system. Every character has several moves that when used in a juggle combo will cause the opponent to be smashed hard into the ground, bouncing them off it in a stunned state, leaving them vulnerable to another combo or an additional attack. As of the Bloodline Rebellion update, successfully parrying a low attack will also put a character into a bound state.

Lars facing bosses King and Marduk in the campaign

The console versions (excluding the PSP version) include an extra beat 'em up mode titled "Scenario Campaign", which bears similarities with the "Tekken Force" and "Devil Within" modes from previous installments. In this mode, the player can move freely in an environment similar to that of a third-person role-playing game. Players can also pick up weapons like poles and Gatling guns, along with lootable items, money, and power-ups which can be found inside crates that are scattered throughout the playing environment. Players can move freely between fights, but when a group of enemies is encountered, the gameplay switches to the traditional, two-dimensional Tekken style. This mode originally included offline single player only, but on January 18, 2010, Namco released a patch that allows online co-op for the Scenario Campaign.

Both the PlayStation 3 and Xbox 360 versions of the game include an online versus multiplayer mode over the PlayStation Network and Xbox Live. It includes Ranked Matches mode, where the player can promote their character to a higher ranking, and Player Matches mode, where the player's fights are not ranked and they can invite friends to have matches with them.

== Plot ==
Six months after Jin Kazama's victory against his great-grandfather, Jinpachi Mishima, in the previous King of Iron Fist Tournament, he is now the new head of the Mishima Zaibatsu special forces. Jin uses the company's resources to declare independence, becoming a global superpower, severing its national ties and openly declaring war against all nations over the following year. Meanwhile, Kazuya Mishima, Jin's father, who has risen to lead G Corporation, places a bounty on his son's head. In retaliation, Jin announces the sixth King of Iron Fist Tournament to lure Kazuya out.

As the war continues to erupt, the field leader of Mishima Zaibatsu's Tekken Force, Lars Alexandersson, has rebelled from the army along with several of his soldiers. However, Lars loses his memory during an attack by the G Corporation and spends some time recovering it. Accompanied by an android, Alisa Bosconovitch, Lars ventures throughout the world, avoiding the Mishima Zaibatsu's manhunt for him while also trying to recover his past. It is eventually revealed that Lars is actually the illegitimate son of Heihachi Mishima, who has gone into hiding since his supposed demise in the last tournament, and has been trying to take the Mishima Zaibatsu from Jin's hands. After coming into contact with several allies, including his adoptive brother, Lee Chaolan, Lars confronts the G Corporation and Mishima Zaibatsu's headquarters. Jin reveals he had sent Alisa to spy on Lars' actions all along. Taking control of Alisa, Lars is forced to confront his former teammate, who leaves with Jin to Egypt.

Helped by one of his allies, Raven, Lars goes to Egypt. He meets an astrologist named Zafina who fears an ancient evil that will destroy the world: Azazel. Azazel is a demonic monster currently bound in an ancient temple. Lars confronts his half-brother Kazuya in front of the door leading to Azazel's chamber and fights him. As Kazuya escapes, Lars and Raven seemingly defeat Azazel. Outside the temple, Lars is forced to damage the opposing Alisa. Enraged, Lars beats up Jin, when he mocks Alisa's failure. Following his defeat, Jin admits that his reason for launching the war was to awaken Azazel as it can only take a physical form through the negative energies of the world, and destroy him. In doing this, he would free himself from the Devil Gene in his body. Revealing Azazel can only be destroyed by someone with the Devil Gene, Jin confronts and attacks the revived Azazel, sending them both plummeting to the desert. Lars requests Lee to fix Alisa and goes on another mission. Raven unearths Jin's body in the desert and notes that Jin still has the Devil mark on his arm.

== Characters ==
The original arcade version of Tekken 6 features 39 playable characters, consisting of 34 returning and 5 new ones. Bloodline Rebellion and the console version adds two new fighters for a total of 41 playable characters. There are also two unplayable bosses: NANCY-MI847J and Azazel, although the former can be controlled for a brief time in the console version's Scenario Campaign mode.

=== New characters ===
The new characters include:

- Alisa Bosconovitch ^{a}: An android, who can also use her own arms and head as weapons.
- Azazel ^{b}: A giant monster, as antagonist and the final boss of the game.
- Bob Richards: An American who was known as a martial arts genius. Being unable to defeat larger opponents, however, he disappeared from the fighting world determined to increase his weight and power while still maintaining speed. Bob enters The King of Iron Fist Tournament 6 to test his new skills and size.
- JACK-6: A new model of the JACK series of robots, built for Kazuya's G-Corporation.
- Lars Alexandersson ^{a}: Heihachi Mishima's illegitimate son and the leader of the Mishima Zaibatsu rebellion. He is the protagonist of the campaign and fights using Shorinji Kempo.
- Leo Kliesen: A German Bajiquan fighter. They are intended to be a character who can be played both by beginners and experienced players. The death of Leo's mother at the hands of Kazuya Mishima prompts Leo to begin investigating the Mishima Zaibatsu.
- Miguel Caballero Rojo: A Spanish matador with a passion for fighting but no real discipline. Miguel wants to exact revenge on Jin and the Mishima Zaibatsu for causing the death of his sister at her wedding.
- NANCY-MI847J ^{b} ^{c}: The mid boss of the game. NANCY is a giant robotic creation of Mishima Zaibatsu, like the Jack robots.
- Zafina: A woman who enters the tournament to prevent the clash of the "two evil stars" and who fights with ancient martial arts.

=== Returning characters ===
The returning characters include:

- Anna Williams
- Armor King II
- Asuka Kazama
- Baek Doo San
- Bruce Irvin
- Bryan Fury
- Christie Monteiro
- Craig Marduk
- Devil Jin
- Eddy Gordo
- Feng Wei
- Ganryu
- Heihachi Mishima
- Hwoarang
- Jin Kazama
- Julia Chang
- Kazuya Mishima
- King II
- Kuma II
- Lee Chaolan
- Lei Wulong
- Lili De Rochefort
- Ling Xiaoyu
- Marshall Law
- Mokujin
- Nina Williams
- Panda ^{d}
- Paul Phoenix
- Raven
- Roger Jr.
- Sergei Dragunov
- Steve Fox
- Wang Jinrei
- Yoshimitsu

^a Added in Bloodline Rebellion and the console version
^b Unplayable boss
^c Playable only in the "Millennium Tower" level in the PlayStation 3 and Xbox 360 version's Scenario Campaign
^d Skin/palette swap

== Development and promotion ==
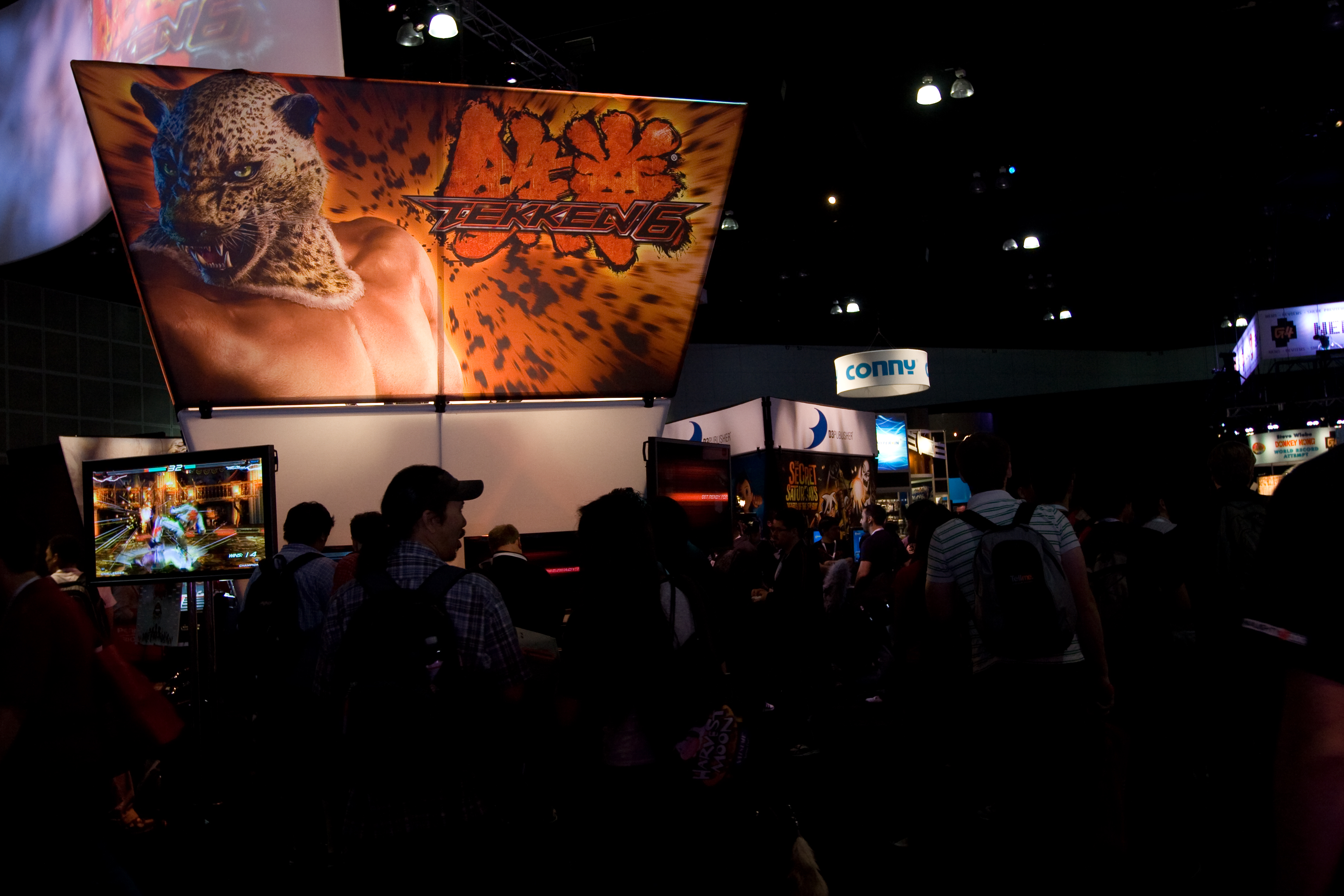
Promo of Tekken 6 during E3 2009

Japanese gaming magazine Famitsu first announced in April 2006 that Tekken 6 was to be developed for the PlayStation 3. The first trailer was revealed at Sony's E3 press conference that year. According to Video Games Daily, feedback from the first trailer was negative. However, project director Katsuhiro Harada said at that time the team was not working on Tekken 6 full-time because they were busy developing Tekken Dark Resurrection. Harada's main concern with Tekken 6 was that it appeal to newcomers and older players. The game was released in Japanese arcades on November 26, 2007. It was the first game running on the PlayStation 3-based System 357 arcade board. Both versions also saw a limited release in North America. Harada said Namco decided to make a Tekken installment for the Xbox 360 because of multiple fan requests. Response to the original arcade game was highly positive, but Harada said the team aimed to make more improvements to attract new players. He noted that feedback from the arcade's release in Japan had surpassed that of previous titles. For the updated release, the team wanted to include more playable characters than in Tekken 5, make the techniques unique as well as more intuitive, and make the fights as brutal as possible. The game uses a proprietary graphics engine running at 60 frames per second as well as a dynamic physics engine named the "Octave Engine", which simulates fluid dynamics and among other things, allows water to behave realistically according to how the characters move. The graphics engine has been designed with a focus on character-animation to make movements look smoother and more realistic. This led to many animations being remade to either reflect the impact and damage caused, or to create new possibilities in gameplay. The developers considered animation extremely important for a fighting game and wanted to make the game "look good in motion", whereas previous installments had been designed to "look good on still shots". Since Bloodline Rebellion, the game has supported dynamic full-body motion blur, making Tekken 6 the first fighting game to do so.

Harada revealed they had encountered difficulties making the cast balanced. As a result, Namco took notes from the characters' victories in the original arcades and modified the cast and rebalanced the game. To make battles more strategic, the Rage system was created. Another new element is the use of items by the characters. While Harada did not find this as unique as the Rage System, he felt it added more to the battles' fun factor. Like some games in the Mortal Kombat series, Tekken 6 is notable for adding the element that allows players to throw enemies down to another area of the stage. This was added to create longer combos if the player has the opportunity, not for the sole purpose of inflicting more damage. A major obstacle in producing the game was Namco's idea to include game modes that allowed four simultaneous characters. This took major rework, especially for online mode. Director Yuichi Yonemori also noted that the team wanted to make fights faster while adding these new mechanics. To provide more variety, each stage that could be destroyed was given its own sound effect and each character also had their own.

On October 23, 2009, Namco Bandai released a Tekken 6 themed Game Space on the North American version of PlayStation Home. Tekken 6: Bloodline Rebellion was released to Japanese arcades on December 18, 2008. It featured new characters, stages, items and customization options and gave the game a balance update to its characters and items. The console version of Tekken 6 is based on this arcade version and was released for consoles, but under the name Tekken 6. In October 2009, Namco announced the game's development had been completed, and it would be released for PlayStation 3 and Xbox 360 consoles. The online elements of Tekken 6 were based on the ones from Tekken: Dark Resurrection. Harada announced the game's roster would be the largest in the series, and that after Tekken 3 they were paying special attention to make sure each character is unique in appearance, personality and techniques and does not overlap with other characters.

Multiple guest artists designed alternative costumes. This one illustrates Masashi Kishimoto's sketch of Lars which would be used in a Naruto game from CyberConnect2.

This new version features two new characters: Alisa Bosconovitch, an android built in the image of Dr. Bosconovitch's deceased daughter, and Lars Alexandersson, Heihachi Mishima's illegitimate son and leader of a rebellious Tekken Force faction fighting Jin's tyranny. This expansion also features a number of new items and customization options for characters to use during fights. Unlike previous console games, all the characters are unlocked when the game starts. Harada said the reason behind this was his belief that unlocking characters was outdated, and that online gamers would find their favorite characters faster. Unlike other new Tekken 6 characters who were based on fan input, both Lars and Alisa were created using a different approach, focusing on their importance to the game's story. As a result, in the arcade version of Tekken 6, most of Lars' identity was kept a mystery, leaving it to the console versions' Scenario Campaign mode to explain his role in the series, with Harada teasing about his potential attack on Jin Kazama's forces. Jin's characterization was changed from an anti-hero to a villain, something Harada had been planning to develop for years. However, his change of personality remained a secret to be explored in the story.

A number of artists joined the team to create new outfits for a few characters: Lars, Jin, Kazuya and Zafina were also given additional outfits designed by Masashi Kishimoto, Clamp, Takayuki Yamaguchi and Mutsumi Inomata, respectively. Outfits for Anna Williams and Asuka Kazama were made by Mamoru Nagano, and Ito Ogure did one for Lili Rochefort.

It was ported for the PlayStation Portable on November 24, 2009. Although the scenario campaign was removed from the PlayStation Portable's port, the developers added background information for the characters in the arcade mode. Makoto Iwai, chief operating officer of Namco Bandai, said the developers tried to make the PlayStation Portable contain as much content as the original console versions. For this reason, the PSP port has new modes and stages not present in the original one. In late 2009, Harada hinted at the possibility of the game having downloadable content but said that whenever possible it would be made available free of charge. In January 2019, Tekken 6 became playable on the Xbox One, thanks to its backwards compatibility function.

=== Music ===
Tekken 6 features a large cast of composers. Keiichi Okabe of Monaca served as one of the main composers, for the first time since Tekken 3. Him and sound director Kanako Kakino decided to incorporate a wide variety of genres within the soundtrack, so he intentionally created a handful of tracks that did not sound like those of previous Tekken games.

The cast also includes in-house composers Rio Hamamoto, Ryuichi Takada, Yoshihito Yano, Go Shiina, Akitaka Tohyama, and Keiki Kobayashi, as well as Kazuhiro Nakamura, Satoru Kōsaki, Keigo Hoashi, and Kakeru Ishihama from Okabe's company Monaca, and Shinji Hosoe and Ayako Saso of SuperSweep. Music for the scenario campaign cutscenes was handled by Hitoshi Sakimoto (who had previously composed for Tekken Advance), along with other composers at his company Basiscape, including Masaharu Iwata, Yoshimi Kudo, Noriyuki Kamikura, Azusa Chiba, Kimihiro Abe, and Mitsuhiro Kaneda, with its compositions being performed by the Czech Film Orchestra. The PSP version features additional music composed by Tohyama, Tetsuya Uchida, Yano and Junichi Nakatsuru. The console version of Tekken 6 features music in 5.1 surround sound.

A soundtrack for the console version of the game, spanning three discs, was released by SuperSweep on December 9, 2009. Three soundtracks for the game were released on iTunes around the time of the console version's release: one for the original arcade release, one featuring tracks new to Bloodline Rebellion, and one featuring tracks new to the PSP port.

== Reception ==
Reception

Aggregate scores
Aggregator	Score
GameRankings	PS3: 80/100; X360: 81/100
Metacritic	PS3: 79/100; X360: 80/100; PSP: 82/100

Review scores
Publication	Score
1Up.com	B+ A− (Second opinion)
Eurogamer	7/10, 8
Game Informer	8.75/10
GameRevolution	B−
GameSpot	8.5 8
GameSpy	3.5/5 4/5 (PSP)
GameZone	8.4
IGN	PS3 and 360: 8.8 PSP: 8.5
TeamXbox	9.2/10
VideoGamer.com	8/10

Award
Publication	Award
IGN	Best PSP Fighting Game; Best PSP Fighting Game (Readers' Choice)

Critical response to Tekken 6 among reviewers has been generally favorable, with the PS3 version scoring a 79 on Metacritic and the 360 an 80. Several journalists praised the additions to the game's mechanics and modes, as well as the large cast. Though compared with competitors from the same genre like Soulcalibur IV and Virtua Fighter 5, critical response remained positive in general. However, the Rage system was found unfair by 1UP.com due to the high damage the player can deal with it while GameSpot found it unlikely to help weakened characters. The two new leads, Lars and Alisa, were praised by critics for their moves even if their designs came across as ridiculous. Newcomer Bob was praised for his surprising obese appearance that contrasts the rest of the fighters with GameInformer comparing to the Street Fighter IV debuting member Rufus. The final boss, Azazel, though, was heavily criticized for being overpowered.

The game's Scenario Campaign mode was subject to mixed criticism as well for citing bland environments and repetitive enemies. The camera was reported to have some issues that might affect the moves' input—moves. Additionally, the mode was compared to role-playing games due to how the player can power up the characters. On the other hand, there was positive response thanks due to its variety, length as well as the amount of replay value.

The PlayStation 3 version of the game initially garnered negative response for its excessive load times when run without installing it previously and its initially laggy online multiplayer component, which was later improved via updates. Once Namco patched it the score of 1UP.com was revised upward. The PSP version received positive reviews, with Metacritic giving it 82 out of 100. IGN said the portable version had greatly improved loading times compared to its console counterparts, while others enjoyed it despite lacking the Scenario Campaign and retaining the same graphics. More shared similar opinions on how the PSP port managed to impress, retaining the large cast, and for its responsive controls.

During its first week, the PlayStation 3 version of Tekken 6 sold 103,000 units in Japan. According to Media Create, this made it the fastest-selling fighter. It remained so until August 2012 when the PS3 port of Persona 4 Arena broke the record with sales of 180,000 units. In May 2011, Namco Bandai reported it had become its best-selling game from 2010 with 1.5 million units sold. The game got to number three on the UK sales charts. In North America, the game sold over one million units as of August 2010. Upon its release in Japan, the PSP port sold 25,131 units. As of May 2011, Tekken 6 has sold more than 3.5 million copies worldwide. In April 2024, Tekken 6 has sold 5.6 million copies worldwide.

In 2009, Tekken 6 was nominated for a Spike Fighting Game of the Year award but lost to Street Fighter IV. However, it still won the Best PSP Fighting Game and Best PSP Fighting Game Readers' Choice from IGN. During the 13th Annual Interactive Achievement Awards, the Academy of Interactive Arts & Sciences nominated Tekken 6 for "Fighting Game of the Year", which was ultimately awarded to Street Fighter IV.

=== Legacy ===
In retrospective, Harada believes Tekken 6, and Tekken 5, managed to attract a new group of fans, something Tekken 4 failed to do. For this game, Lars was given an alternate design created by manga author Masashi Kishimoto, famous for writing the series Naruto. In 2009, CyberConnect2 CEO Hiroshi Matsuyama read in a Weekly Shōnen Jump magazine that Lars' third costume had been designed by Kishimoto and thought he should be included in the Naruto video game Naruto Shippuden: Ultimate Ninja Storm 2. As a result, Matsuyama approached Tekken 6 producer Suguru Sasaki and his team and asked them to allow him to include Lars in the game using Kishimoto's outfit. Once this was approved, the Tekken staff began assisting CyberConnect2 to adjust Lars' moves to fit the other characters in the Naruto game.

The first CGI scene from the game also influenced the developers to create a film titled Tekken: Blood Vengeance which uses this type of animation.

At the MCM London Comic Con 2009, a Tekken 6 player named Eliot Smith-Walters was awarded the Guinness World Record for the longest winning streak in Tekken 6, having won 68 consecutive matches.

Tekken 6 was followed by a spin-off titled Tekken Tag Tournament 2. A sequel, titled Tekken 7, was announced on July 13, 2014. More information on the sequel was made available during Bandai Namco's panel at the 2014 San Diego Comic-Con. The game had a limited arcade release in Japan on February 18, 2015, followed by a full release on March 18, 2015. Harada states that Tekken 7's story mode was influenced by the Scenario Campaign from Tekken 6 as he believes recent games in the franchise have tried elaborating more on the series' storytelling despite being a fighting game. Tekken 6 was rereleased in 2015 with Tag Tournament 2 and Soulcalibur V as PlayStation 3 Fighting Edition for its title console. Tekken 6 was re-released on PlayStation 4 and PlayStation 5 in 2023, as part of the PS Plus Classics lineup.
