= Christie Monteiro =

Tekken character

- Tekken character
- Christie Monteiro in Tekken 6 (2007)
- First appearance: Tekken 4 (2001)
- Voiced by: List: Xanthe Smith (Tekken 4); Rumiko Varnes (Tekken 5 – current (in game/battle grunts)); Debi Mae West (Tekken 5 cutscenes); Sayaka Kinoshita (Japanese dub of the Tekken film); Beatriz Villa (TTT2–current (dialogue)); Lisle Wilkerson (Street Fighter X Tekken, English); Marina Inoue (Street Fighter X Tekken, Japanese)
- Portrayed by: Kelly Overton

In-universe information
- Fighting style: Capoeira
- Origin: Brazil
- Nationality: Brazilian

Christie Monteiro (Japanese: クリスティ・モンテイロ, Hepburn: Kurisuti Monteiro) is a character in the Tekken video game series of 3D fighting games. She is a Brazilian fighter who uses the fighting style, capoeira.

She is the granddaughter of a legendary capoeira master who taught Eddy Gordo the art of capoeira in prison. After Eddy Gordo's release, Eddy swears an oath to his master to teach his granddaughter, Christie, the art of capoeira. Becoming a prodigy in only two years, Christie mainly involves herself in The King of Iron Fist Tournaments in search of a cure for her grandfather, who has become sick during his incarceration.

The character has received positive reception from critics and fans, and, along with Eddy, has been credited with popularizing the art of capoeira to a new audience within the larger gamer and martial arts community.

== Conception and design ==
The Tekken 3 development team wanted to include a Capoeira practitioner for the game and turned to the development artists to create the character. It was desired by Masahiro Kimoto, one of the game designers of Tekken 3, that the Capoeira character be female but the artist that was tasked with the character's design deemed the female character too difficult to create and instead created Eddy. After some time, a female Capoeira practitioner in the form of Christie was created for Tekken 4. Originally, she replaced Eddy as the Capoeira representative of the series, while Eddy remained selectable as a skin for Christie. However, starting with Tekken 5: Dark Resurrection, Eddy was given back his character slot, even though both characters still played near-identically.

== Appearances ==
In the Tekken series, Christie is the granddaughter of a legendary capoeira master who is incarcerated in the same prison cell as Eddy Gordo. Eddy is taught the art of capoeira and after his release, his master requests that he seek and teach his granddaughter Capoeira. Finding her soon after his return from The King of Iron Fist Tournament 3, Eddy manages to teach Christie to become a capoeira prodigy in only two years. But soon thereafter, Eddy abruptly vanishes, leaving Christie only with the words, "Those responsible for my father's death must pay." Troubled by his sudden and mysterious disappearance, Christie goes looking for him, resulting in which her only lead is The King of Iron Fist Tournament 4.

Christie reunites with Eddy during or after the tournament, as the two are together to see Christie's grandfather being released from prison. Because of his incarceration, Christie's grandfather has become a frail old man and is diagnosed with a terminal illness that leaves him only six months to live, although a cure might be possible with technology from the Mishima Zaibatsu. Several days later, Christie learns of The King of Iron Fist Tournament 5. She sees it as a chance to save her grandfather, believing that she may be able to find a cure for him if she possesses the advanced technology from the Mishima Zaibatsu. Christie enters the tournament, but she is defeated and goes home to Brazil. Upon her arrival, she finds out that both her grandfather and Eddy are missing. She learns that her grandfather was transferred to the Mishima Zaibatsu's medical facility. To find the exact location of her grandfather, Christie enters The King of Iron Fist Tournament 6. In her and Eddy's epilogues, Christie finds that her grandfather is dead. She breaks down in tears over his grave, and Eddy, who was the one responsible for transferring her grandfather so he could be cured from funds he received by working with Mishima Zaibatsu, drops his Mishima Zaibatsu emblem to the ground, breaking it slightly.

Christie also makes appearances as a playable character in the non-canon Tekken games Tekken Tag Tournament 2 and Tekken Revolution, as well as Street Fighter X Tekken via DLC released in July 2012, with her official tag partner, Lei Wulong.

In the 2009 film Tekken, Christie is portrayed by American actress Kelly Overton. This version of Christie is a mixed martial artist instead of a capoeira fighter, has no relationship with Eddy Gordo, and is a love interest of Jin Kazama.

== Promotion and reception ==
A model portrayed Christie in the "Tekken Maxim Photoshoot" gallery in Maxim. Kotobukiya released a 1/7 scale (9.8 inches tall) Christie action figure in January 2012 as part of their Tekken Tag Tournament 2 storyline; she is seen in a dance-like posture and her usual Tekken costume, except her pants are turned into chaps with her panties visible.

The character has received reception from gaming media as one of the "hottest" women in video games. Aubrey Sitterson of UGO Networks placed Christie fourteenth on his 2011 list of "Fighting Games' Finest Female Fighters": "In addition to being totally foxy, something about the idea of a lady Brazilian Capoeira expert just totally clicks for us." Kevin Wong of Complex commented in 2013: "With big eyes and an even bigger...um...smile, Christie has our immediate attention." Maxim said of the character in 2010, "Replacing the previous lone Capoeira-style character, Eddy Gordo, Christie has quickly made herself a popular Tekken fighter." Tom Loftus of NBCNews.com said in his 2005 review of Tekken 5, "Who can resist Christie Monteiro, a Brazilian capoeira expert with a fashion preference for tie-dye?"

However, Christie has been criticized for other factors such as her gameplay mechanics, characterization, and visual appearance in the 2009 Tekken feature film. USGamer's Samantha Leichtamer named her one of the "10 Lamest Video Game Characters of All Time", in that "button mashers and scrubs far and wide finally had a shot to enter the fighting game arena." GamesRadar said in 2002, "[Eddy] Gordo replacement Christie was promising, but below her purple-sequinned exterior she's the same old button-masher's delight with two new victory poses and a few different throws." Jeremy Dunham of IGN commented in his review of Tekken 5, "I'm particularly jazzed that Namco finally toned down newbie 'mash bastards' like Christie Monteiro". She was featured in a "Gaming's Most Inappropriate Outfits Ever" feature by NowGamer in 2010: "Cheapness aside, we can’t get our head around how Christie’s top manages to stay on as she spins and rolls about like Sonic the Hedgehog on speed." In 2012, the "insufferable" Christie was listed as one of the "most ridiculous" Tekken characters by Writtin King of Game Informer: "I don't know why Christie thought joining (and inevitably losing) a fighting tournament would save her sick grandpa." Brent McKnight of PopMatters described Christie in the 2009 Tekken film as the "forced love interest" of main character Jin Kazama.

In spite of many sources regarding her as one of the "hottest" women in gaming, some sources are also critical of her design and outfits. In the Portuguese study Além de monstros e capoeiristas: a representação brasileira nos jogos de luta, the authors examined Christie's "hypersexualized" nature, and because of this, criticized her primary outfit as "poorly designed," unfavorably comparing it to Eddy's costume. In Female Representation in Video Games, the writers were critical of her "hypersexualization," noting that "Christie does not wear clothes suitable for capoeira games, which have white T-shirts and white pants that are preferably wide for greater mobility." American rapper Megan Thee Stallion cosplays as Christie in the music video for her song "Boa". As a result of this, an image of Christie was posted on Megan's Instagram page and Christie was also mentioned in an article of Time magazine which points out different references from the music video. In a behind the scenes video for the music video "Knocc Em' Down", American rapper Snoop Dogg states that Christie and Lili are his favorite Tekken characters. The song alongside the Snoop Dogg stage was released as a collaboration with Bandai Namco for Tekken Tag Tournament 2. Professional wrestler Zelina Vega cosplayed as Christie during one of her livestreams. America's Next Top Model, cycle 1 winner Adrianne Curry cosplayed as Christie for San Diego Comic-Con in 2012.
