= Tekken Advance =

2001 video game

- US box art
- Developer: Eighting
- Publishers: JP: Namco; NA: Namco Hometek; EU: Infogrames
- Director: Yasuhiro Noguchi
- Producer: Yuichi Toyama
- Designer: Yasuhiro Noguchi
- Programmers: Yasunari Watanabe; Katsuhiro Sugita; Kenji Shibayama
- Artists: Shinichi Ōnishi; Satoru Yoshimura; Shoji Mizumoto
- Composers: Hitoshi Sakimoto; Atsuhiro Motoyama
- Series: Tekken
- Platform: Game Boy Advance
- Release: JP: December 21, 2001; NA: January 28, 2002; EU: March 29, 2002
- Genre: Fighting
- Modes: Single-player, multiplayer

Tekken Advance (Note: Japanese: 鉄拳アドバンス, Hepburn: Tekken Adobansu) is a 2001 fighting game developed by Eighting and published by Namco for the Game Boy Advance. It uses sprites based on Tekken 3's 3D models for its characters but the overall menus, fonts and art-style are all modeled after Tekken Tag Tournament. It was the first Tekken game to be released on a Nintendo platform.

== Synopsis ==
It is non-canonical to the Tekken storyline, but follows the events of Tekken 3.

== Gameplay ==
The gameplay in Tekken Advance is similar to other games in the series, but because it is on a portable system, the inputs were simplified or removed altogether. It utilizes a single-input system, with kick mapped to the A button, punch to the B button, and the left and right triggers used for tagging and throws, respectively. The game also included a side-step feature.

Despite the simplification, Tekken Advance introduces new mechanics by implementing a wide range of "stun" variations such as "pop stuns", "crumple stuns" and right/left stuns.

== Characters ==
The game features most of the starter characters from Tekken 3, with the exceptions of Eddy Gordo and Lei Wulong. Gun Jack, who was unlockable in Tekken 3, is playable from the start, with Heihachi Mishima being the sole unlockable character and final boss in lieu of Ogre.

- Ling Xiaoyu
- Yoshimitsu
- Nina Williams
- Forest Law
- Gun Jack
- Hwoarang
- Heihachi Mishima (unlockable)
- Paul Phoenix
- King
- Jin Kazama

== Reception ==
Reception

Aggregate scores
Aggregator	Score
GameRankings	79%
Metacritic	82/100

Review scores
Publication	Score
Electronic Gaming Monthly	5.83/10
Nintendo Power	3.5/5

Tekken Advance has generally received positive reviews. It received an 8.5 out of 10 from IGN, and an 8 out of 10 from GameSpot saying "It looks and feels close enough to its counterpart to succeed." GameSpy gave it a much more favourable score with 88 out of 100, calling it an impressive game for the Game Boy Advance. Electronic Gaming Monthly gave it a mediocre score with 5.83 out of 10. Nintendo Power gave the game a 3.5 out of 5.

Tekken Advance was a runner-up for GameSpot's annual "Best Graphics on Game Boy Advance" award, which went to Yoshi's Island: Super Mario Advance 3.
