= Tekken 5: Dark Resurrection =

2005 fighting video game

- North America cover of the PSP version depicting Jin Kazama and Devil Jin
- Developers: Namco; Eighting (PSP)
- Publisher: Namco (Note: Published by Namco Bandai Games for the PlayStation Portable and PlayStation 3.)
- Director: Katsuhiro Harada
- Producer: Katsuhiro Harada
- Series: Tekken
- Platforms: Arcade, PlayStation Portable, PlayStation 3
- Release: Arcade: JP: December 2005; WW: February 2006; PlayStation Portable: JP: July 6, 2006; NA: July 25, 2006; AU: September 14, 2006; EU: September 15, 2006; PlayStation Network: JP: December 12, 2006; NA: March 1, 2007; EU/AU: March 23, 2007
- Genre: Fighting
- Modes: Single-player, multiplayer
- Arcade system: Namco System 256

Tekken 5: Dark Resurrection (鉄拳5 DARK RESURRECTION), also known as Tekken: Dark Resurrection for the PlayStation Portable version, is a 2005 fighting game and a standalone update to Tekken 5. The arcade version was released in Japan in December 2005 and later worldwide in February 2006, while the PlayStation Portable version was released later that year in July 2006. It was also released as a downloadable game on the PlayStation 3 via the PlayStation Network online service in Japan in 2006 and the rest of the world in 2007. A sequel, Tekken 6 was released in 2007.

== Plot ==
As an update, the same story as Tekken 5 is featured, with the addition of three new characters. Emilie De Rochefort seeks to destroy the Mishima Zaibatsu and end her father's financial problems. Sergei Dragunov is a member of Spetsnaz who has been ordered to capture Jin Kazama. Finally Armor King II, the younger brother of the original Armor King who seeks revenge on Craig Marduk for his brother's death. The story mode is only available in the PSP version, while featuring only the minimal gameplay for the PS3 Network edition that came after the PSP release.

== Differences from previous versions ==
Along with the many additions to the PlayStation 2 version of Tekken 5, the Arcade Battle has been upgraded by adding twelve more ranking titles and removing one: Conqueror. Tekken Lord is no longer the highest ranking like it was in Tekken 5. Dark Lord is one ranking above Tekken Lord and the highest ranking is Divine Fist.

Divine Fist is only achieved by successfully completing all of the league matches, survival tournaments and ranking tournaments in Tekken Dojo mode. The opportunity is offered once a promotion chance is offered sometime in the Heaven Dojo, the sixth stage in Tekken Dojo mode. Obviously it is only offered when the player is ranked as a Dark Lord. In the European PSP version, the player's current character will be promoted from Dark Lord to Divine Fist, once they have completed all dojos, including the challenges, and then win the Heaven Dojo ranking tournament once again.

Another addition to Arcade Battle is that it now keeps track of the player's statistics. Each character has a clean slate once they begin playing Arcade Battle. While selecting a character, loading a match and battling an opponent, the player can see their alias, ranking, what region they hail from, their wins, losses and percentage.

Dark Resurrection also rebalanced the game from the original PlayStation 2 version. There were new moves added for certain characters along with other moves that appeared to be overpowered in the previous version were rebalanced. Other changes included completing moves that looked incomplete in the previous version and changing the speed of certain attacks.

Dark Resurrection also provided more tools for the players to customize their characters. The default colors for most of the characters were different from the original version of the game, despite the characters being shown in most of the FMVs and artwork of the PSP version in their original colors. For example, Paul's red dojo uniform became white, Kuma's brown fur became white making him look like a polar bear, and Jinpachi Mishima now appeared to be covered in flames. None of these changes were absolute, since the player could customize the characters back to their original colors, with the exception of Jinpachi, who is not playable in the PSP version and original Arcade version.

Dark Resurrection also includes several new stages. Some of the new stages are actually modified versions of the originals, that contained different textures, details, and remixed versions of the original music. For example, the flaming temple of the original game now appeared a normal temple in daylight and the church of the original appeared as a snowy castle.

== Ports ==
=== PlayStation Portable version ===
The PlayStation Portable version runs at full 60 FPS during matches (although it reverts to around 30 frame/s for the pre-fight and post-fight cinematics). The game features game sharing, which means that only one copy of the game is needed to play over ad hoc. The game runs on version 2.6 firmware for the North American version, and the European version requires version 2.71.

Other modes include Tekken Dojo, where players are able to fight ghosts of other players that can be uploaded and downloaded online. They can also download official ghost packs from arcades all over the world. In Gold Rush mode, the player fights for in-game cash. New versions of Tekken Bowl and Command Attack; bonus games from Tekken Tag Tournament and Tekken 4, are also included.

Due to the PlayStation Portable d-pad's lack of protrusion, Namco produced a special d-pad attachment that sits on top of the PSP's d-pad that came with early releases of the Japanese and Asian versions of the game, as well as pre-ordered copies of the US version. The European version did not include this accessory.

The PlayStation Portable version forgoes the original stages and music present in the arcade version (save for Final Battle 2 stage and its respective theme) and only features the new variations and music added in the Dark Resurrection update. It does contain all of the unique stages from the arcade game, however. It also had cropped versions of the ending movies for all of the characters from Tekken 5.

Tekken: Dark Resurrection charted 5th on the list of the best selling games for July–August for 2006. As of July 26, 2009, the game has sold over 2.2 million copies.

=== PlayStation 3 version ===
Although Tekken: Dark Resurrection had positive reviews and sales, it had disappointed many of the hardcore Tekken players that the game was not available on a PlayStation home console, as all the previous installments had been. As handhelds cannot be taken to the same competitive level as a home console, Namco Bandai announced that the game would be ported to the PlayStation 3. The game retained the numeric title of the Arcade version, unlike the PlayStation Portable version. This version has both the Tekken 5 and Tekken 5: Dark Resurrection stages and music present. However, one stage that was present from Tekken 5 in Tekken: Dark Resurrection for the PlayStation Portable (Final Battle 2) is actually absent in this version. The Space Colony's BGM "The Center of Gravity" is also absent and the original song "Orbital Move" is present in its place.

Tekken 5: Dark Resurrection was first made available on the Japanese PlayStation Store on December 12, 2006. At $16, it made Dark Resurrection the most expensive game available for download. The North American version was made available on March 1, 2007, for $19.99, while the European version was released on March 23, 2007, in conjunction with the PAL launch for GBP 6.99/EUR 9.99. It is also available at the Singapore PlayStation Store for S$24.99 (US$1 = approximately S$1.55).

While the PlayStation Portable version is a visually scaled down version of the Arcade build, the PlayStation 3 version retains its original graphical performance, running at 60 frames per second, and supports full 1080p HD resolution. The game features the same modes as the Arcade version, including Ghost Battle and Gallery, while Jinpachi Mishima is playable for the first time. Initially however, unlike its PSP counterpart, the PlayStation 3 version lacked several additional gameplay modes from Tekken 5 (PS2) and Tekken: Dark Resurrection (PSP), including Story Mode and Bonus. Therefore, the game was made to mirror the actual arcade platform in its limited gameplay but better graphics.

On June 25, 2007, Namco announced an update entitled Tekken 5: Dark Resurrection Online. The update included an Online Versus mode, as well as Online Rankings, marking the first official Tekken to be playable online. A Practice and Survival mode was also added along with the aforementioned features. The update was released on the Japanese store on August 1, 2007 and on the North American store on August 30, 2007.

== Characters ==
Being the update of Tekken 5, Dark Resurrection features the return of all 32 playable characters from that game while adding three new ones. None of them need to be unlocked. Eddy Gordo, a palette swap of Christie Monteiro in the original Tekken 5, has been given his own character slot and customization template. While he is still unplayable in the arcade and PSP port, the PS3 version of the game makes Jinpachi Mishima into a playable character for the first time in the series. He can be accessed by clearing Arcade Mode once.

=== New characters ===
- Armor King II: The former trainer of King II who mysteriously appears after being thought to have been killed by Craig Marduk, but in later games revealed to be his younger brother, Armor King II, who seeks revenge against Marduk for killing his older brother.
- Lili De Rochefort: A Monégasque teenager practicing Street Fighting who participates in the tournament to take down Mishima Zaibatsu so she will be able to put an end to her father's financial problems. Her full name is "Emilie De Rochefort".
- Sergei Dragunov: A member of Russian Spetsnaz practicing Sambo who is sent to capture the bearer of the Devil Gene, Jin Kazama.

=== Returning characters ===
- Anna Williams
- Asuka Kazama
- Baek Doo San
- Bruce Irvin
- Bryan Fury
- Christie Monteiro
- Craig Marduk
- Devil Jin
- Eddy Gordo
- Feng Wei
- Ganryu
- Heihachi Mishima
- Hwoarang
- Jack-5
- Jin Kazama
- Jinpachi Mishima ^{a} ^{b}
- Julia Chang
- Kazuya Mishima
- King II
- Kuma II
- Lee Chaolan
- Lei Wulong
- Ling Xiaoyu
- Marshall Law
- Mokujin
- Nina Williams
- Panda ^{c}
- Paul Phoenix
- Raven
- Roger Jr.
- Steve Fox
- Wang Jinrei
- Yoshimitsu

^a Unlockable in PlayStation 3 Version
^b Unplayable in Arcade and PlayStation Portable Version
^c Skin/palette swap

== Reception ==
=== Reviews ===
Reception

Aggregate scores
Aggregator	Score
GameRankings	(PSP) 89% (PS3) 82%
Metacritic	PSP: 88/100; PS3: 82/100

Review scores
Publication	Score
GameSpot	9.2/10
GameSpy	4.5/5
IGN	9.2/10
PlayStation Official Magazine – UK	10/10
Official U.S. PlayStation Magazine	9/10
PlayStation: The Official Magazine	9/10
X-Play	4/5

Award
Publication	Award
IGN	Best Fighting Game of 2006; Best PSP Fighting Game of 2006; Best Graphics Technology on PSP in 2006 (runner up) PSP Best Offline Multiplayer Game of 2006

Critical response to Tekken: Dark Resurrection has been overall very positive. GamesRadar claims it to be the single best portable fighting game ever.

The PlayStation 3 version was also well received. Critics praised the updated graphics and being able to play online, but criticized the lack of modes the PSP version featured and lag while playing online.

The Academy of Interactive Arts & Sciences nominated Tekken: Dark Resurrection for "Fighting Game of the Year" at the 10th Annual Interactive Achievement Awards.

As of July 2009, the PSP version has sold 2.2 million units, including 1 million sold in Europe.
