= Tekken 5 =

2004 fighting video game

- Arcade flyer featuring Kazuya Mishima
- Developer: Namco
- Publisher: Namco (Note: Published in North America by Namco Hometek and in Europe by Sony Computer Entertainment Europe)
- Directors: Masahiro Kimoto; Katsuhiro Harada
- Producer: Hajime Nakatani
- Designers: Yuichi Yonemori; Takahiro Noda; Kazuo Takahashi
- Programmer: Masanori Yamada
- Artists: Yoshinari Mizushima; Kazuaki Fujimoto
- Composers: Akitaka Tohyama; Satoru Kōsaki; Yuu Miyake; Yoshihito Yano; Rio Hamamoto
- Series: Tekken
- Platforms: Arcade, PlayStation 2
- Release: Arcade: JP: November 16, 2004; WW: December 2004; PlayStation 2: NA: February 25, 2005; JP: March 31, 2005; EU: June 24, 2005
- Genres: Fighting, beat 'em up
- Modes: Single player, multiplayer
- Arcade system: Namco System 256

Tekken 5 (鉄拳5) is a 2004 fighting game developed and published by Namco for arcades, before being ported to the PlayStation 2 in 2005. It is the fifth main game in the Tekken series, marking the tenth anniversary of the series. The game is set shortly after the events of Tekken 4 featuring a new antagonist named Jinpachi Mishima taking over the Mishima Zaibatsu while a sidestory focuses on the protagonist Jin Kazama as he faces several enemies from the G Corporation. The home version also contains a collector's edition of sorts, as it includes the arcade versions of Tekken, Tekken 2, Tekken 3, and StarBlade.

The game reverts several major gameplay changes introduced in Tekken 4, such as uneven stage terrain, in favor of a more fluid gameplay akin to the older games in the series. It is also the first game in the series to feature the ability to customize characters with accessories, clothing, and other aesthetic items purchased with in-game currency. There are 32 fighters to choose from, including five new fighters as well as Jin's alter-ego Devil Jin.

The arcade version of the game was upgraded to Tekken 5.1 exclusively for the NAMCO 256 system on July 14, 2005, which had mostly balance changes to the gameplay including removing the infamous Double Stinger infinite combo of Steve Fox. It was then followed up with the final update Tekken 5: Dark Resurrection which was released in 2005 and later ported to the PlayStation Portable (as Tekken: Dark Resurrection) and the PlayStation 3. Tekken 5 was a critical and commercial success, selling over 9.43 million copies. Critics praised the return of classic gameplay features and the large amount of replay value provided by the PlayStation 2 port though the final boss Jinpachi Mishima was criticized for being too powerful, while Jin's mini-game story mode Devil Within was perceived as "boring" in comparison to the fighting game main Story mode which was open to every character. The sequel entitled Tekken 6 was released in 2007.

== Gameplay ==
New to the features is the hot system which affects the vulnerability of character while they attack. For example, a move with jumping properties, such as a hop-kick, will be completely invulnerable during most of its animation time to all of an opponent's low attacks. It also retains its wall juggling concept from Tekken 4, but the element is effectively more difficult to abuse and easier to defend against. Tekken 5 also allows players to customize their fighter for the first time, allowing them to change the colors of their outfits, buy additional costumes, and equip them with items by using money gained from playing the Story, Survival, Time Attack, the side-story Devil Within, and Arcade Battle modes.

The raised and lowered sections of floors featured in the Tekken 4 levels were removed for the fifth installment. This change made gameplay throughout each stage generally similar, aside from wall placements. In addition to removing the uneven nature of the Tekken 4 styled stages, the design team returned to the style of stages from previous games by having some stages without barriers by allowing them to be infinitely scrolling. For walled stages, the fights take place in fairly symmetrical boxes without any uneven walls. Floors could also crack after one of the characters hit it hard enough. Only one part of a stage can be cracked at a time, however.

Other changes over the Tekken 4 design included the removal of the positional change techniques, bringing back traditional air combat and using a juggle system more akin to Tekken 3 as opposed to the 4th game's less juggle-friendly gameplay.

=== Devil Within ===
Gameplay of Devil Within showing Jin fighting in his Devil Form

The home version also includes Devil Within mode. This is the third installment and gameplay variant in the Tekken Force series (the first two instalments can be found in Tekken 3 and Tekken 4 respectively). Similar to Death by Degrees, 'Devil Within' focuses solely on one playable character, Jin Kazama, who can also transform into Devil Jin. This is a 3D beat 'em up game with platforming elements, in which players must control Jin through a series of labyrinthine levels and battle enemy armies. This mode features bosses, such as True Ogre from Tekken 3, who is not playable in Tekken 5.

== Plot ==
Set moments after Tekken 4's ending, Jin Kazama's departure from the Hon-Maru dojo, G Corporation helicopters approach and begin deploying Jack-4 robot pods into the building. Heihachi Mishima and his son, Kazuya, battle the Jacks together until Kazuya leaves Heihachi for dead while escaping. The Jacks hold down Heihachi while one activates its detonator, creating a huge explosion that seemingly kills Heihachi. The only witness to the event is Raven, a mysterious ninja clad in black, who relays Heihachi's death to his superiors. Heihachi's death is declared all over the world with people foreseeing the end of the Mishima Zaibatsu. However, somebody else takes over the company from the shadows and business continues. Two months later, the King of Iron Fist Tournament 5 is announced. During the tournament, Jin manages to defeat his great-grandfather Jinpachi in the final stage, who dissolves into dust and disappears shortly after, with his wish being fulfilled. With this victory, Jin becomes the new head of the Mishima Zaibatsu, setting in motion the events of Tekken 6.

== Characters ==
The game features a total of 32 playable characters, consisting of 26 returning and 6 new ones. Unlike previous games, the home version adds no new playable character, and the game's unplayable final boss from the arcades, Jinpachi Mishima, remains unplayable in the console version. The home version also has two uncontrollable enemies fought during the Devil Within minigame: Gun Jack and True Ogre.

=== New characters ===
The new characters include:

- Asuka Kazama: A high school student from Osaka which practice Kazama Style Traditional Martial Arts and enters in the tournament to take revenge against Feng Wei for having injured her father and destroyed her family's dojo.
- Devil Jin ^{a}: The Devil form of Jin who uses Jin's old move set composed of his paternal family's martial arts.
- Feng Wei: A Chinese arrogant prodigy of the God Fist style who searches through Japan for information about the scrolls of God Fist.
- JACK-5: The fifth model of JACK series again sent by his creator, Jane, to retrieve JACK-2's memories from Mishima Zaibatsu.
- Jinpachi Mishima ^{b}: The father of Heihachi who is resurrected from the dead by a vengeful spirit.
- Raven: A mysterious ninja agent who is the first to report Heihachi Mishima's supposed demise.
- Roger Jr. ^{a}: The wife-and-son duo of boxing kangaroo Roger set out to rescue their husband/father from Mishima Zaibatsu.

=== Returning characters ===
- Anna Williams ^{a}
- Baek Doo San ^{a}
- Bruce Irvin ^{a}
- Bryan Fury
- Christie Monteiro
- Craig Marduk
- Eddy Gordo ^{a} ^{c}
- Ganryu ^{a}
- GUN JACK ^{d}
- Heihachi Mishima
- Hwoarang
- Jin Kazama
- Julia Chang
- Kazuya Mishima ^{a}
- King II
- Kuma II ^{a}
- Lee Chaolan
- Lei Wulong
- Ling Xiaoyu
- Marshall Law
- Mokujin ^{a}
- Nina Williams
- Panda ^{a} ^{c}
- Paul Phoenix
- Steve Fox
- True Ogre ^{d}
- Wang Jinrei ^{a}
- Yoshimitsu

^a Unlockable character
^b Unplayable boss
^c Skin/palette swap
^d Unplayable enemy in Devil Within mode

== Development ==
After the release of Tekken 4, series director Katsuhiro Harada left Namco due to pressure with game's decline in sales. Harada's boss insisted him to keep producing more titles as he was capable of pleasing people with his work. After a year away, Harada went back to the company explaining it was due to his passion with fighting games. Namco first announced Tekken 5 in E3 2004 during May. Harada aimed to make it the best game in the entire franchise to celebrate its 10th anniversary. He aimed to amplify the action elements of the games and make them more over-the-top. In regards to the handling of the game following the sales of Tekken 4, Harada claims Namco used this response to develop the game. Namco also aimed to make the game fitting for newcomers. The early success of the arcade led the team to research for more content to add in future installments. Based on the company's revolutionary Dynamic Motion Synthesis technology, endorphin was chosen to implement an AI and dynamics simulation to create 3D character animation in real-time, thus dramatically accelerating 3D animation pipelines in games and visual effect studios. Shinichiro Yoda of Namco was optimisitic with this decision. Torsten Reil, CEO of NaturalMotion, said that they were delighted by Namco as they had already put it in test for its first trailer. The arcade cabinet of the game was notable for allowing players to use their PlayStation 2 controls over the regular arcade system. The team felt that for the first time in years, the franchise made a notable progress thanks to Tekken 5.

The game was developed to be different from its predecessor. In contrast to Tekken Tag Tournament, 5 runs on a System 256, a stronger arcade, allowing the team to produce more detailed backgrounds and characters. This was done thanks to the new engine provided by Namco. Early in development, Namco promised gamers there would be a minigame on action adventure style mode similar to the one provided by Tekken 3.

Harada wanted the game to be enjoyable to newcomers as a result of multiple playable characters that might be difficult to master. A blur effect was added to the visuals while several stages were given flames. Early in the production, Tekken 5 was meant to have 20 playable characters, with the selected returning ones being the most popular ones. New movements were added to the returning cast. 600 items were also made for the idea of customization. Among the newcomers, Asuka Kazama stands as a replacement from the missing Jun Kazama who only appeared in Tekken 2 and Tag Tournament. Despite promotion from Tekken 5 claiming that the character has died in the intro, Namco Bandai denied this statement in interviews. Tekken 5 also makes most characters use their own native language during cutscenes, introductions to battles and victory scenes. Producer Takai Homma was in charge of this part of the game. Homma recalls having fun in giving the characters their respective lines as well subtitles. This also led to animal characters having their own lines which have to be read. The goal of Homma was surpassing the two previous Tekken games.

The CGI studio Digital Frontier, who had previously worked with Namco on earlier games, assisted with the creation of CGI cutscenes in the game.

=== Music ===
The game features a large cast of music composers, including Akitaka Tohyama, Yoshihito Yano, Yuu Miyake, Junichi Nakatsuru, Satoru Kōsaki, Rio Hamamoto, Ryuichi Takada, and Hiroshi Okubo. The same team also worked on the PS2 version, with the addition of Tetsukazu Nakanishi, Keiichi Okabe, Kohta Takahashi, Kazuhiro Nakamura, Keiki Kobayashi, Nobuyoshi Sano, and Katsuro Tajima. The opening song for the PS2 version, "Sparking", features vocals by Tom Leonard and Jeff Pescetto. The music encompasses many genres, including techno, rock and nu metal. Victor Entertainment released the soundtrack.

=== Ports ===
The PlayStation 2 port was made in order to contain everything from the original arcade alongside new content. This originated from fan response who often requested Namco that. Harada gave Kei Kudo the task of compressing the port version of the game properly. In October 2005, the game was re-released under the budget-friendly "Greatest Hits" label in Japan. The game was re-released as Tekken 5.1, a free upgrade to the arcade version of Tekken 5. It includes changes to the character life bars and character select screen, and some changes in character moves to improve game balance. For example, Steve Fox's infinite was removed, and a few other strong moves were toned down. The Devil Within was created as something only the port could carry.

Available in the version for the arcades, the PSP and the PlayStation 3 (via the PlayStation Network), Tekken 5: Dark Resurrection is an update of Tekken 5. It was officially announced at the 2005 JAMMA AM Show but news of it leaked slightly beforehand. The update Dark Resurrection would further add additional characters, more features, and customizations in addition to gameplay rebalancing. It was directed by Haruki Suzaki who aimed to turn Jinpachi into a playable character. The Japanese version took about two and a half months. The PlayStation 3 port proved difficult to port as a result of its different engine.

== Reception ==
=== Critical response ===
Reception

Aggregate scores
Aggregator	Score
GameRankings	89%
Metacritic	88/100

Review scores
Publication	Score
Eurogamer	9/10
GameRevolution	8/10
GameSpot	9.2/10
GameSpy	5/5
GameZone	9.6/10
IGN	9.3/10
VideoGamer.com	8/10
GameAxis Unwired	9.5/10

Awards
Publication	Award
GameSpot	Best Fighting Game of 2005
IGN	Best PlayStation 2 Fighting Game

Tekken 5 was met with mainly positive critical response, resulting in a score of 88 out of 100 at Metacritic. Several writers found its mechanics superior to its predecessor, Tekken 4, due to the return of classic mechanics and the importance of each stage as well as faster combat. The fact that Tekken 5 removed the exclusive features from its prequel was also a subject of praise. The new mechanics to customize the characters were praised and compared with the ones from Virtua Fighter 4. The new characters were also the subject of positive response due to the variety they provide. Additionally, the PlayStation 2 port was heavily praised for the inclusion of the first three Tekken to play, which expanded the replay value.

Negative comments focused on the 'Devil Within' mini game due to poorly executed mechanics, despite giving the player the possibility of using Devil Jin for the first time, with GameAxis Unwired calling it derivative of the Tekken Force mini-game from Tekken 3 while GameRevolution compared it to the poorly received spin-off Death By Degrees. The final boss Jinpachi Mishima has often been criticized for how overpowered he can be to the point of often being rated as one of the worst bosses in gaming.

The presentation was the subject of positive response. The visuals were praised both for the improvement to the fights as well as the new CGI endings over real time cutscenes coupled with interludes and narration in the story mode, as well as improvements to bodies' textures to the point GameZone and GameSpot found it as a more faithful sequel to Tekken 3 than 4. The idea of having the characters speaking their native languages over English was well received. VideoGamer.com enjoyed the large amount of content player can unlock in the gallery mode too.

Tekken 5 was also awarded "Best Fighting Game of 2005" by GameSpot, and "Best PlayStation 2 Fighting Game" by IGN. During the 9th Annual Interactive Achievement Awards, Tekken 5 received a nomination for "Fighting Game of the Year", which was ultimately awarded to fellow Namco fighting game Soulcalibur III.

=== Legacy ===
Tekken 5 was ranked by Complex as the sixth best PlayStation 2 game. SNK staff member Falcoon said Tekken 5 was one of his favorite games in 2005 although he did not consider himself an expert in the game. Game designer Tomonobu Itagaki heavily panned the console port of the game for lacking innovative features after several installments from the franchise. Similarly, The Rough Guide to Videogames felt the story was convoluted and that the Devil Within was poorly done. PC Mag listed Paul Phoenix's and Lee Chaolan's endings as two of the "craziest" moments in the franchise.

Producer Harada acknowledged that the game was still riddled with problems, such as characters that were too strong (for example, Steve Fox), and a gameplay that was broken in terms of fairness. This led to the patched update Tekken 5: Dark Resurrection. The fighters were also forced to remain stationary prior to the round beginning.

The game's critical praise was matched with commercial success. As of July 2009, it has sold around 6 million copies. In retrospective, Harada believes Tekken 5, and Tekken 6, managed to attract a new large group of fans, something Tekken 4 did not do relatively as much despite its positive reviews. However, Harada was not without criticism, and stated that Tekken 5 did revert the innovation in Tekken 4 by returning to classic conservative gameplay to please the older fans, which in hindsight he should not have resorted to in excess of the innovation that could have been., In 2024 the game selling over 9.43 million copies. A sequel, Tekken 6, was released in 2007. The first CGI scene from the game also influenced the developers to create a film titled Tekken: Blood Vengeance (2011) which uses this type of animation.
