= Jin Kazama =

Character in Tekken

- Tekken character
- Jin Kazama in Tekken 8 (2024)
- First appearance: Tekken 3 (1997)
- Designed by: Yoshinari Mizushima
- Voiced by: Isshin Chiba (since Tekken 3) Others: Minami Takayama (Tekken: The Motion Picture, Japanese); Jacob Franchek (Tekken: The Motion Picture, English); Darren Daniels (Tekken: Blood Vengeance, English); Brad Swaile (Street Fighter X Tekken, English); Kaiji Tang (Tekken: Bloodline, English)
- Portrayed by: Jon Foo (2009 film); Dallas James Liu (2009 film) (young)
- Motion capture: Ryu Narushima
- Country: Japan

In-universe information
- Fighting style: List: Kyokushin Karate (primary style from Tekken 4 onward); Kazama-style traditional martial arts (based on Daitō-ryū Aiki-jūjutsu); Mishima-ryū Karate (in Tekken 3 and as Devil Jin, based on Shitō-ryū)

Jin Kazama (Japanese: 風間 仁, Hepburn: Kazama Jin) is a character and the protagonist of Bandai Namco's Tekken series. Introduced in the 1997 game Tekken 3, he has been the central character of the series from that game onwards. Trained by his grandfather Heihachi Mishima, Jin wishes to avenge the apparent death of his mother, Jun Kazama, at the hands of Ogre. However, Heihachi betrays Jin to awaken a genetic abnormality within the latter's body known as the Devil Gene (Japanese: デビルの血, Hepburn: Debiru no Chi; lit. "Devil's blood"), leading Jin to seek revenge against his grandfather in later installments.

He is also antagonized by his father, Kazuya Mishima, from whom he inherited the devil gene at birth. While dealing with his relatives, Jin loses control of the Devil Gene, which causes his transformation into an alter ego named Devil Jin (Japanese: デビル仁, Hepburn: Debiru Jin), first introduced as a non-playable character in Tekken 3 and playable ever since Tekken 5. Outside of video games, Jin has appeared in animated and live-action films adapted from the games and has also appeared as a playable character in several other game franchises.

Initially conceptualized as an innocent man, Jin was developed as the series' new protagonist and a replacement for Kazuya, who he was based on visually. His constant fights with his family members would eventually lead him to become an antiheroic character, as crafted by Bandai Namco's director Katsuhiro Harada ever since his introduction. Nevertheless, Jin was portrayed as the main character in multiple adaptations of the games. He has been voiced consistently by Isshin Chiba since he debuted in Tekken 3 and has had multiple English actors across other appearances.

Critical reception to the character has been positive, with commentary focused on his moves and his role within the wider Tekken story. Since his introduction to Tekken 3, Jin has proven to be quite popular and has often been described as one of the best Tekken characters due to his fighting style and because of the impact he had on the storyline. His dark characterization was also noted while Devil Jin also remained popular for retaining Jin's classic Mishima-Ryu fighting style which he discarded since Tekken 4, before retaining it in Tekken 8.

== Creation ==
=== Development ===
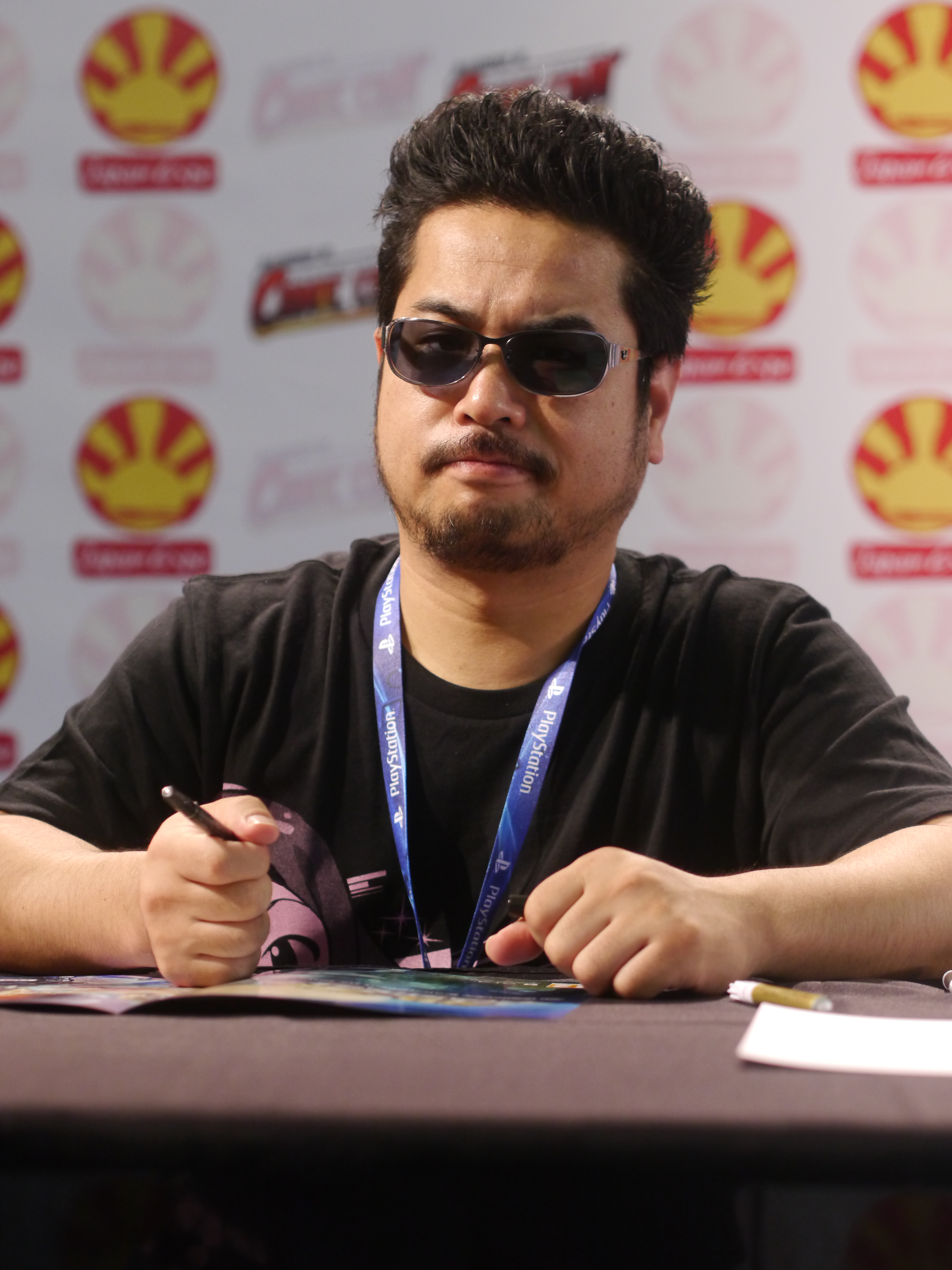
Game designer Katsuhiro Harada was in charge of Jin's characterization in the series.

Jin Kazama was created by Namco artist Yoshinari Mizushima after he graduated from college, with the character's design being a great surprise to the Tekken staff. Jin was introduced in Tekken 3 using the concept of a "misfortunate character" which was part of his dark character arc across the series. The staff also wanted to present him as a determined character. Despite their similarities, Jin was a more caring character in contrast to his mean spirited father, Kazuya. This was the result of their different upbringings. However, both end up becoming more alike as characters because of their dark stories like their shared antagonism for Heihachi Mishima. This would further corrupt Jin but in a different way than his father. Rather than destroying the world like his relatives, Jin instead wishes to end the Mishima bloodline, and himself in the process. Jin and Kazuya share powered up devil forms. They are a common element in fantasy which stands out because of them being genetically related in Tekken. The parallel between Jin and Kazuya's devils was compared to the protagonists from the Star Wars films, Luke Skywalker and Darth Vader, respectively.

Tekken series' director Katsuhiro Harada has said that Jin is his favorite character in the series along with Heihachi. He says the Tekken story is written from Jin's perspective because he is the main character. Jin's concept was that of an innocent young kid corrupted by the evils of society, who would become one of the series' greatest villains as crafted by Harada over the span of ten years. He only serve as villain role in Tekken 6, Harada motivated players to use the Scenario Campaign to explore Jin's darker character arc as well as his possible relationship with newcomer Lars Alexandersson. Devil Jin completes the character's arc that Harada crafted in terms of his corruption which is now represented in his genes. Harada recalls receiving letter from fans who were angry for turning Jin into a villain in Tekken 6.

In response to claims that the Tekken story is complicated, Harada denied this. He saw it as a "simple" struggle between members from the Mishima family. By 2017, fans still saw Jin as a hero. Harada replied that the character is still responsible for creating wars so the plot continues to have a sense of black and white morality. Harada compared his family with the Tekken characters who are constantly fighting each other: Heihachi, Jin and Kazuya. As a parent, he now has a "deeper respect for my family and parents in particular." A common interpretation of Jin's mother Jun Kazama's fate is that she was killed before the events of Tekken 3. This is explored in a story from Jin's point of view and is a belief that most gamers shared. However, Jin and the gamers were actually incorrect—Jun is missing. As a result, Harada explained that as far as the rivalry between Jin and Kazuya is concerned, Jun would be present at their eventual confrontation.

Before the revelation of Jin's inclusion in Tekken 7, there were many gamers who asked Harada if he survived his battle against Azazel in Tekken 6. Harada refrained from answering questions about Jin's status, but said Tekken 7 would be a proper sequel to the series with or without Jin. However, both Jin and his Devil persona were leaked in 2015 by fans. For Tekken 7, Jin was made into a hidden sub-boss in the game's arcade mode. Harada explained that the requirements to unlock him were very difficult. Harada added a hint that players who use Kazuya Mishima might have a better chance of fighting Jin while the Devil persona is a hidden boss.

Tekken 8 was revealed with a fight between Jin and his father Kazuya, which has been building up for several years. While Jin already faced his relatives in previous games from the franchise, in the latest one, he is shown in a major conflict with his Devil Gene as it keeps absorbing his humanity to the point he becomes Devil Jin in the middle of the fight. However, Harada remarked that the final scene of the trailer involving broken chains act as symbolism to Jin breaking free from the conflicts he has been connected for several games. After several installments and spin-offs involving Jin's appearances, Harada apologized to the character for the harsh treatment he gave him.

=== Design ===
Early sketches of Jin's design by Yoshinari Mizushima

Jin's visual appearance was modeled after his father Kazuya Mishima who was missing in Tekken 3. Jin was given a similar appearance including spiky black hair, red gloves and similar black and red pants (keikogi) to the point it confused returning players. In early concepts, Jin was depicted with more clothing covering his left arm. The idea of his design was for it to be simple yet highly recognizable. Originally, Jin was named Jin Mishima (三島仁) with a visual appearance being more reminiscent to his father, most notably in his gloves. His design was made less muscular than his predecessors.

Although in his first appearance, he was shown wearing nothing to cover his torso, in following games, Jin was given a jacket along with a hood in Tekken 4 which Harada found to be highly popular with the fanbase. Meanwhile, the new white pants and gi from Tekken 4 was used in future games starting with Tekken Advance. As a result, Harada views the constant comments about this as positive feedback despite his initial confusion over the fanbase's reaction. Tekken 5 features a special costume for Jin designed by guest artist Mutsumi Inomata: it is a panda-themed costume with an unzipped jacket that reaches just above his midriff with a blue flame motif and matching white pants. In Tekken 6, replacing the jumpsuit, Jin wears a long black coat similar to the one that he wore in his ending in Tekken 5. Jin's alternative outfit in Tekken 6 was designed by Clamp, a group of four Japanese manga artists. For Tekken 7, his regular design was made by Yūsuke Kozaki, while Ando Makoto did a special chibi illustration of the character. while Takuji Kawano did his Tekken 8 outfit which fellow artist Hiroaki Hashimoto found cool.

Jin's alter ego, Devil Jin, possesses a tattoo that covers his entire torso. Harada claimed he grew to like this part of the design. Devil Jin is often shown wearing chains in his body though that instead is symbolic. Like his father's devil persona, Jin's also shown to possess wings though Harada claims they are actually related with his mother's heritage rather than the Mishima's. For the film Blood Vengeance, Jin manages to control his Devil powers, resulting in him achieving a new Devil transformation. This form was designed by Takayuki Takeya, who is famous designing characters from Devilman and Kamen Rider. Director Yōichi Mōri conceived, saying he wanted to change the impression of the Devil in the game. The New Devil Jin was given a "sinister yet beautiful" design the audience give a different impression from the game in order to attract more people.

=== Actors and related media ===
Isshin Chiba has been Jin's voice actor in all his Japanese game appearances. Chiba claimed he initially did not understand the character when first recording his lines in his debut. The actor grew attached to Jin over the years he voiced him and thus disliked how Jin changed from a kindhearted man to a corrupt person in the later games as well as his transformation into a devil. Jon Foo felt honored to play Jin's character in the live-action film based on the series. He says he is a fan of the Tekken games. Still, he found it difficult to play Jin as he spent three months on a diet in order to do the fighting moves for the live-action film. In the making of the film, Foo accidentally wounded Cung Le. The film's director, Dwight Little, found that this type of accident is common in fighting films.

For the film Tekken: Blood Vengeance (2011), writer Dai Satō added both Jin and Kazuya as a pair of men to provide "visual eye-candy" in the same way as the Williams sisters did. While Jin and Ling Xiaoyu appear to have developed a close relationship, Satō did not want to explore a romantic one in the film. Instead, the writer wanted to use these pairs to be played together in the spin-off game Tekken Tag Tournament 2, which relies on the use of teams composed of two fighters. Chiba was replaced by Patrick Seitz in the English release of the film, being credited as "Darren Daniels". Though Satō believes Jin is intrigued by Xiaoyu, he wanted his characterization to be dark especially with how brooding is Jin in an early scene where he laughs at the idea of his fight with Kazuya being the subject of the world's destruction which ambiguously connects Xiaoyu's story. Satō acknowledged that several members of the audience complained that Jin had little screen time but he is glad with it.

In the original version of the anime film Tekken: The Motion Picture (1998), Jin has been voiced by Minami Takayama, while Jacob Franchek has voiced him in the film's English dub. Jin has been voiced by Brad Swaile in the game Street Fighter X Tekken.

Comic book artist Cavan Scott said that his first impression of Jin in Tekken 3 was that he was unfit to be a Mishima based on his differences with Kazuya and Heihachi, who are described as "demons" in contrast to Jin's innocence. However, as he becomes a corrupt person, Scott believes Jin is no longer a good person but fits the narrative better because of conflicts with his relatives. Scott believes Jin became a more interesting character during this dark character arc. As Scott began writing a Tekken Western comic, he decided to tell the story from Jin's point of view as he was the most relatable character, despite his dark characterization. Jin feels guilty for all the chaos he has brought to the plot. Since Scott's comic was based on Tekken 6 and Tekken 7, he wanted to explore this take on Jin further since he was the center of the readers' attention even if he is missing through most of the plot.

While Chiba reprises his role for Tekken: Bloodline, Kaiji Tang voices Jin for the English dub. Chiba was glad that he kept voicing Jin after 25 years since his debut while Tang appreciated the shades of his personality.

=== Gameplay ===
As a result of being introduced as the protagonist in Tekken 3, Jin's movements were made to be balanced so that he would have neither strong nor weak movesets. This caused difficulties in his design. He was meant to appeal to veterans of the franchise as he uses both moves from Heihachi and Kazuya but not with the same amount of power. As Jin has no model for his fighting style, several of his karate moves were created by the Tekken staff. Ryu Narushima was Jin's motion actor as Narushima also possessed regular karate in his fighting style. Harada said he thought Steve Fox and the Mishimas—Jin, Kazuya and Heihachi—were considered the strongest characters to play in the series.

In his early appearances, Jin's moves were a blend of parents, Jun Kazama and Kazuya Mishima, a combination of "Kazama-Style Self Defense" (風間流古武術, Kazama-ryū Kobujutsu) and "Mishima Fighting Karate" (三島流喧嘩空手, Mishima-ryū Kenka Karate). He fights in this style in both Tekken 3 and Tekken Tag Tournament. In Tekken 4, however, this style was discarded in favor of "traditional" Karate, also known as Kyokushin karate. As a result, Jin performs unique techniques such as one known as the "Right Roundhouse Punch", Right Hook (右回し突き, Migi Mawashi-tsuki) in Japan. Jin is often regarded as the strongest character in Tekken 4, together with Steve Fox, who was seen as a fellow top-tier character, as well as his mother Nina Williams who was a counter to the two fighters. Jin had an unblockable move called the Just Frame Laser Annihilator (back, forward + 2, 1, down/forward + 2 on the Arcade inputs), which was a Laser Scraper but done in one exact or just frame that could be sidestepped or parried only. In tournaments though it was rarely used, rather according to gamer Jackie Tran, it was the threat of the move seen in major tournaments that forced opponents to play safe to prevent it, thereby giving easy opportunities for Jin to mostly parry in order to win tournaments. The move was changed but returned in Tekken 8 in a blockable form. As his power was reduced in the following games, becoming a low-tier character in Tekken 5 tournaments, he went through minor changes that made him notably stronger in Tekken 6 than his Tekken 5 persona. Devil Jin incorporates moves from Jin's Mishima fighting style, which makes him a stronger fighter than the regular Jin. Like Kazuya's devil persona, Jin's devil form can create a projectile move. However, Devil Jin's fighting style is listed as "Unknown". Nevertheless, Devil Jin also possesses a number of weaknesses that separately balances his duality with the regular Jin.

In preparation for Tekken 7, Harada commented he would often try Devil Jin if he was an "intermediate player" comparing his skills with Heihachi's. Famitsu recommended the regular Jin to advanced Tekken players. For Capcom's crossover game Street Fighter X Tekken, the official guide noted how Jin could easily counterattack enemy's moves.

== Appearances ==
=== Main Tekken series ===
Devil Jin in Tekken 8

Jin's first appearance is in Tekken 3, where he is introduced as a teenager "claiming to be Heihachi's grandson" as a result of being Jun Kazama and Kazuya Mishima's child. Following his mother's death at the hands of Ogre, Jin trains with Heihachi. Jin defeats True Ogre in Heihachi's tournament only to be betrayed and killed by his grandfather. However, Jin is revived when his body mutates into a devil, taking down Heihachi and escaping. Tekken 4 explores how Jin has fallen into a pit of self-hatred, despising everything related to the Mishimas. Learning a new karate style for two years, Jin enters another tournament to confront Kazuya and Heihachi. After his Devil form awakens, Jin tries to kill Heihachi, but spares him after remembering his mother and abandons the area.

In the events of Tekken 5, Jin seeks to end his curse by fighting the host of the next tournament. Following this he defeats his great-grandfather, Jinpachi Mishima, and becomes the new CEO of the Mishima Zaibatsu (三島財閥) special forces. Tekken 5 also marks the debut of Devil Jin as a playable character as well as sub-boss who is taking over the human persona. If Devil Jin defeats Jinpachi rather than the regular Jin, an alternative ending is featured showing Devil Jin absorbing Jinpachi's powers. In the same game, a mini-game focusing on Jin's prologue is featured called Devil Within. It features Jin's journey to G Corporation's laboratory where he faces multiple enemies after hearing Jun's voice.

During Tekken 6 Jin uses the Zaibatsu for world conquest, having started a war against all nations. Jin hosts the sixth King of Iron Fist Tournament to rid himself of Kazuya and his enemies. In gameplay, just as his devil form served as the Stage 8 sub-boss in Tekken 5, Jin serves as the Stage 8 sub-boss in Tekken 6. He is also the main antagonist from Tekken 6's "Scenario Campaign" where Jin is confronted by his half-uncle Lars Alexandersson who is rallying a faction within the Zaibatsu's military to take him down. Upon his defeat, Jin explains he has been throwing the world into disarray in an effort to awaken the beast known as Azazel. Jin's goal in awakening such a monster is to fight it in a suicidal battle.

Jin appears in Tekken 7 as a sub-boss, replacing Heihachi if the right conditions are met. However, in the updated arcade version, and the console ports, he is no longer a sub-boss. In the Story Mode, a weak Jin loses control of his Devil Gene again and starts causing a rampage. While in his weakened state, Jin wanders in the Middle East until Lars rescues him. Following his recovery, Jin joins forces with Lars to bring the world back to order and kill Kazuya. Playing as Devil Jin results in an encounter with Hwoarang, but the battle is interrupted by multiple enemies.

In Tekken 8, Jin is first seen on a motorcycle confronting Kazuya in an organized ambush alongside Lee and Lars. He challenges him to a battle, with both assuming their devil forms, but Jin is defeated by Kazuya, causing the mission to end in failure. After recovering, he loses the Devil's power but still participates in Kazuya's tournaments. During the qualifiers, he meets Reina, a student from the Mishima Polytechnic and a fellow competitor. On her request, he agrees to let her aid him in his fight against Kazuya. In the finals, Jin fights and defeats Leroy Smith. The tournament is interrupted in between when Kazuya reveals that the tournament was created as a set-up to absorb Azazel and transforms into a true Devil. Jin and a few other fighters, including Xiaoyu, escape to Yakushima, returning home after 7 years. Believing he may be able to regain his powers at the point of his origin, he visits the Kazama Sanctum. After a prolonged battle, Jin finally accepts his Devil side and his past, regaining his powers, and fights Kazuya. In the middle of their battle, Jin awakens his Angel form, Angel Jin (エンジェル仁, Enjeru Jin), after seeing visions of his mother. The two fight all the way to outer space and the resulting clash from both sides leads to the removal of their Genes and also erases Azazel's existences. Jin and Kazuya, now regular humans, continue their battle, with Jin finally managing to defeat his father in the end. In the downloadable content, Jin makes peace with Eddy Gordo during early events of the game. In an alternative arcade mode ending, Jin reunites with Jun.

=== Other games ===
As well as his canonical appearances, Jin appears in Tekken Card Challenge and Tekken Tag Tournament. Beating Tag Tournament as Jin results in a sequence where he tries to kill Kazuya, but his body then starts shaking. In Tekken Tag Tournament 2, Jin can defeat an enemy identical to his mother, Jun Kazama, but mutates when she disappears. In Devil Jin's ending, the berserker demon tries to leave the planet but is stopped by Jun's spirit. He then appears on a beach where soldiers rescue him. A Link outfit from The Legend of Zelda was given to him for Tekken Tag Tournament 2's Wii U version. Additionally, in the "Fight Lab" section of the game, Lee kidnaps Jin, Kazuya and Heihachi for Combot's final test of the machine.

Other appearances by him include: Tekken Advance, Tekken R, Tekken Resolute, Tekken Bowl, Tekken Pachinko Slot 2nd, Tekken 3D: Prime Edition, Tekken Card Tournament, Tekken Revolution, Tekken Arena, CR Tekken, Tekken Pachinko Slot 3rd and Tekken Mobile. Devil Jin's form from Blood Vengeance also appears in Tekken Tag Tournament 2.

Jin is also featured in Namco × Capcom, where he joins forces with Ryu and Ken Masters from Street Fighter series and seeks to defeat Devil Kazuya who was his father through the Devil Gene. Street Fighter X Tekken features Jin as a playable character, with Ling Xiaoyu as his official tag partner. The duo seeks to find an item known as Pandora's Box with Jin wanting to use it as a way to get rid of his demon. They are also together in Project X Zone where they are targeted by Street Fighter character Seth. They along with Virtua Fighter series hero, Akira Yuki, work together to stop him. He returns in the sequel Project X Zone 2 with Kazuya as his partner.

He appears on a promotional poster for the Namco-produced crossover fighting game Tekken X Street Fighter, along with Street Fighter's Ryu (as well as their alter egos "Devil Jin" and "Evil Ryu"). Devil Jin's fighting style and costume parts, along with his human form's Tekken 6 karate, are available for use with custom characters in Soulcalibur V. Harada's image was used to promote Jin's moves. Although he does not appear, Jin is mentioned in the crossover fighting game PlayStation All-Stars Battle Royale. Additionally, Jin's image appears as downloadable content in Namco's game Ace Combat: Assault Horizon. He appears in SNK's mobile phone game The King of Fighters All Star in his classic look and his Tekken 7 design. His persona is used as card artwork alongside Kyo Kusanagi, the protagonist of The King of Fighters. Jin is the protagonist of the Tekken side of the game where he enters Rugal Bernstein's The King of Fighters tournament to finish his rivalry with Kazuya. Jin appears as a Spirit in the Nintendo crossover video game Super Smash Bros. Ultimate. He also appears in Brawlhalla.

=== In other media and merchandise ===
Jon Foo as Jin in the live-action film Tekken

Jin makes a brief appearance as a child in the epilogue of the anime film Tekken: The Motion Picture. His role in the series is also briefly shown in the manga Tekken Comic, and the novel Tekken: The Dark History of Mishima. He is also the protagonist of the manga Tekken: The Other Side of Battle, as well as the Western comics Tekken Forever and The Tekken Saga. Titan's Tekken comics focuses on Jin's battles against Heihachi to protect Ling Xiaoyu and combat his inner demon.

He also appears in the CGI-animated film Tekken: Blood Vengeance, an alternate retelling of events between Tekken 5 and Tekken 6. In the film, Jin once again seeks a man known as Shin Kamiya who is tied to the Devil Gene. However, Kamiya is killed by Heihachi who was using him to attract both Jin and Kazuya to take their genes. With help from Alisa Bosconovitch, Jin emerges as the winner and leaves hoping his high school friend Ling Xiaoyu defeats him in the next tournament, having considered himself a threat to the world.

In the 2009 live-action film Tekken, Jin is portrayed by Jon Foo. This version of Jin differs significantly. He was not raised by Heihachi, and his mother was killed during a crackdown on insurgents by the Tekken Corporation. He is still the illegitimate son of Kazuya. He enters the Iron Fist tournament to take revenge on Heihachi for his mother's death, but during the tournament, he learns that it was Kazuya who was responsible. He progresses through the tournament, falling in love with Christie Monteiro and forming alliances with Steve Fox, Raven, and Heihachi himself when Kazuya overthrows him. Eventually, Jin makes it to the final, and defeats his father in battle, yet refuses to kill him because of their blood relation.

Jin has been featured as an action figure in both his Tekken 3 and Tekken 4 appearances.

Jin reappears in the original net animation Tekken: Bloodline as the protagonist based on his appearances of the game Tekken 3.

== Reception ==
=== Promotion and merchandise ===
In May 2012, Namco Bandai opened the Tekken Museum in Osaka, Japan, which houses a statue of Jin and Kazuya in a cross-counter. In promoting Tekken 8 snickers based on the character were created. Two collectors editions were released: a standard collectors edition and a premium collectors edition. Both formats include the same content as the Ultimate Editions, as well as the game packaged in a boxset, eight glossy collector cards, two arcade tokens, a metal ring inspired by the aesthetic of character Leroy Smith, and a figurine of Jin Kazama (the premium edition includes an electrified mechanism that causes the statue to light up).

=== Critical response ===
Jin has been described as one of the best Tekken characters due to his rivalry with family members Kazuya and Heihachi Mishima. The character's popularity in the Tekken series also earned him special recognition among fighting games in general; his relationships with other characters throughout the series were also popular. The character's physical look has been the subject of much praise as well as the variability of his clothing across the series. Although Jin appears in Tekken 3 as a replacement for the protagonist Kazuya Den of Geek found the execution worked to the point that Netflix's staff appeared to have chosen such narrative as the one to adapt in Bloodline. In Dianna Ferrand's Industry Armageddon: Can Heroines Save the Game Industry? published by Stanford University, Jin is recognized as one of the first gaming characters to have a realistic personality as the narrative of Tekken 3 involves his quest to take revenge on Jun. Ferrand believed that, as a result, players might find Jin appealing. Similarly, the book Japanese Culture Through Videogames addresses Jin as a complex fictional character, comparing him with Metal Gear's Solid Snake and Final Fantasy's Terra Branford and Cloud Strife due to his identity issues over his powers and relatives. This is primarily explored in Tekken 4, where Jin confronts his father Kazuya for the first time, while also dealing with the Devil Gene he inherited from him.

Critics have focused on Jin's devil alter ego and his darker characterization. Complex enjoyed Jin's transition from a regular hero to anti-hero. Den of Geek's Jasper Gavin did not find Jin's role as the main antagonist in Tekken 6 appealing. He compared him negatively with both Kazuya and Heihachi, who he felt were more menacing villains. Gavin felt his relationship with other characters in Tekken as well as his inner conflict with the Devil Gene were appealing but was disappointed by how Jin's character declined across the story. Devil Jin's debut in Tekken 5 was well received for his differences with the regular Jin. The crossovers Tekken had with Street Fighter also further raised Devil Jin's popularity with regard to similarities with the characterization of Evil Ryu. In 2017's Refracted Visions: Transmedia Storytelling in Japanese Game, Rachael Hutchinson, an associate professor of Japanese Studies at the University of Delaware, noted that the Devil Gene is well explored in the character's fighting style as Jin performs different techniques when taking on this look. As a result, she regarded his characterization as one of gaming's best translations from storytelling to gameplay. Moreover, players who play Jin Kazama are noted to be highly skilled as they have to practice his two personas. The character's design and moveset were often cited as one of the biggest reasons behind his popularity within Tekken even if they come across as unrealistic comparing him with two other icons: Solid Snake and Lara Croft.

Upon the reveal of Tekken 8, Kotaku enjoyed the friendly interaction he has with Lars Alexandersson, comparing it to Ryu and Ken Masters' dynamic from Street Fighter series though his interaction with Xiaoyu was criticized for being too stoic. PCGamer and Redbull praised the return of the Mishima feud between Jin and Kazuya in the story mode despite finding it more like an anime rather than realistic. The Gamer praised Jin's character development in Tekken 8 for becoming a more heroic man in contrast to his villain persona from Tekken 6 as he faces Kazuya again while acknowledging his own sins. The same site regarded several moments from the story involving Jin to be the best from his first clash with Kazuya to how he is able to confront his inner darkness and become an angel to counter his father in appealing cinematic scenes.

There were multiple reactions in response to Jin's special moves. His initial move-set was noted to be based on his relatives' techniques, with the change shown in Tekken 4 praised for him bringing his own take on karate. Others found such modifications entertaining as it meant learning new moves, but also criticized the change as it made practice by veteran players pointless. Capcom senior community manager Seth Killian had found the Tekken 4 version too powerful to the point of quitting the series with Comic Book Resources also claiming he was too ovepowered. Regarding Jin's Tekken 5 fighting style, GameSpy stated that players would now need to be patient playing as him, as he lost his overpowered moves. Because of the change to Jin's moves in Tekken 5, sites recommended players use Devil Jin's incarnation in the game, if they missed his original techniques.

Critics have also focused on Jin's appearances in other media. For the first Tekken live-action film, BeyondHollywood thought Jon Foo's appearance might appeal to viewers based on his similarities with Jin. The Fandom Post disliked the love interests presented to Jin as well as his fights in the Iron Fist Tournament. DVD Verdict criticized how Jin was lacking most of his important traits, most notably his Devil Gene and commented that his quest for revenge was not appealing because of his interactions with other supporting characters. DVD Talk agreed, stating that Tekken struggled "to create a fulfilling hero's journey for Jin as he greets a dead end on his path to revenge". Although Martial Arts and Action Movies criticized Foo's acting to the point of making Jin emotionless, his fight sequences were praised.

Titan's comics of Tekken earned mixed responses because of how the conflict with Jin is handled. Jin's incarnation from Bloodline resulted in praise from the media for how the narrative offers multiple point of views of Jin's morals as he is trained by both his pacifist mother and his violent grandfather but the heavy focus on him over the supporting cast was criticized. His characterization was compared to with those of archetypical shōnen manga protagonists due to his personality and powers.
