= Eddy Gordo =

Tekken character

- Tekken character
- Eddy Gordo in Tekken 6 (2007)
- First game: Tekken 3 (1997)
- Portrayed by: Lateef Crowder
- Voiced by: List: Roger Craig Smith (Tekken 6 (Scenario Campaign Cinematics)); Takuma (Japanese dub of the Tekken film); ? (Tekken Tag Tournament 2); D. C. Douglas (Street Fighter X Tekken, English); Kenta Miyake (Street Fighter X Tekken Vita: Episode Series, Japanese); Marcos Nazareth (Tekken 7 – present)
- Motion capture: Marcelo "Caveirinha" Pereira

In-universe information
- Fighting style: Capoeira
- Origin: Brazil
- Nationality: Brazilian

Eddy Gordo (Japanese: エディ・ゴルド, Hepburn: Edi Gorudo) is a fictional character from the Tekken series by Bandai Namco Entertainment (formerly Namco). Eddy is a Brazilian capoeira fighter. Introduced in the 1997 fighting game Tekken 3, Eddy has since appeared in every main game thereafter. He becomes a palette swap for Christie in Tekken 4 and Tekken 5, before becoming a main character in Tekken 6.

Eddy's storyline from his debut through Tekken 5 revolved around his quest for revenge for the murder of his parents, culminating in the defeat of Kazuya Mishima during the events of Tekken 5. In Tekken 5 and Tekken 6, Eddy's plot focused on his and Christie Monteiro's search for a cure to an unknown illness that Christie's grandfather, Eddy's Capoeira master, was suffering from. Eddy has received heavy criticism in the fighting game community for the low skill floor associated with his play style; however, the character, along with Christie, has been credited with popularizing the art of capoeira to a new audience within the larger gaming and martial arts community, and has influenced popular culture.

== Character development ==
The Tekken 3 development team wanted to include a Capoeira practitioner for Tekken 3 and turned to the development artists to create the character. It was desired by Masahiro Kimoto, one of the game designers of Tekken 3, that the Capoeira character be female but the artist that was tasked with the character's design deemed the female character too difficult to create and instead created Eddy. Kimoto later stated that his favorite character from Tekken 3 was Eddy, because of the challenges in his development.

Mestre Marcelo Pereira, a Brazilian capoeira master, was the motion capture artist for Eddy Gordo in Tekken 3. Pereira stated that Namco had heard of him as a result of his 1995 International Capoeira Seminar held in San Francisco, and that he felt honored in being chosen by Namco to represent Capoeira in Tekken 3. Marcelo Pereira reported that during the development of Tekken 3 he had been injured, as a result the acrobatic movements he performed were restricted. He also claimed that he performed "about 20%" of what he was capable of performing because it was necessary to have "another skillful capoeirista to spar with" to perform some movements in Capoeira. Additionally, Pereira criticized Namco's naming choices for Eddy Gordo and his moves, noting that Eddy is not a Brazilian name and that "Gordo" in Portuguese meant "fat" and the movements' names were not "traditional" like the names he had called them during development.

== In video games ==
Eddy Gordo first appeared in Tekken 3 and appeared in the following title, Tekken Tag Tournament. In Tekken 4, Eddy Gordo was initially omitted from the roster and was replaced with Christie Monteiro, another Capoeira practitioner, but appeared as an alternate costume for Christie in the console release, and without serving any purpose in the storyline. Masahiro Kimoto stated that Eddy was replaced because initially, they had intended to create a female Capoeira character in Tekken 3 but instead changed to a male character due to artistic limitations. In Tekken 4, the team was able to successfully create "an attractive female character named Christie" who practiced Capoeira, so they chose to replace Eddy with her. Eddy, once again, served as a character costume swap for Christie in Tekken 5, but became a separate character in the Tekken 5 update, Tekken 5: Dark Resurrection; however, while he did have his own character customizations, his moveset remained identical to Christie's. Eddy Gordo appeared again in Tekken 6, and its update, Tekken 6: Bloodline Rebellion, but his moveset has remained similar to Christie's, only differing in move properties such as speed and distance. Additionally, in Bloodline Rebellion, Eddy serves as the boss for the 28th level of the Scenario Campaign Mode, the "Tekken Force 4th Special Forces Operational Group Compound".

Eddy was born into one of the richest families in Brazil. When Eddy was 19 years old, his father was killed while trying to destroy a Brazilian drug cartel known as the "Organization". In his last breaths, Eddy's father asked his son to take responsibility for his death. Eddy went along with his father's last wish and served eight years in prison, during which he met an old man who taught him Capoeira. For his eight years of prison, Eddy practiced until he became a master. Upon his release, Eddy heard about the King of Iron Fist Tournament 3 and the Mishima Financial Empire (MFE), the sponsor of the tournament and a conglomerate compared to a "large slice of the world" which is owned by Heihachi Mishima. He decided to enter the tournament, believing he could either convince the MFE or take control of it and force it to help him get revenge on his father's killers. As shown in his Tekken 3 ending, Eddy tracked down the gang who killed his father; the gang members confessed that the killing had been ordered by Kazuya Mishima.

In Tekken 4, it is learned that while Eddy was in prison he learned of his master's granddaughter, Christie Monteiro, and made a promise to his master to teach her Capoeira when Eddy got out of prison. After the King of Iron Fist Tournament 3, Eddy found and taught Christie Capoeira, who became impressive at the martial art after two years of training. Soon after Christie's training, Eddy left, saying, "Those responsible for my father's death will pay." Christie Monteiro entered The King of Iron Fist Tournament 4 to find Eddy, as this was the only clue that could lead her to him.

Prior to Tekken 5, Eddy learns that the master who taught him capoeira in prison is about to be freed. Eddy goes to his release but discovers that his master has become a weak and frail old man, not the great Capoeira master he had studied under. After he takes his master to a hospital, Eddy learns that he is dying from an incurable disease that will give him less than six months to live. There is hope, however, if the Mishima Zaibatsu's technology and resources could be put to use. Knowing this and hearing the announcement of the fifth King of Iron Fist tournament, Eddy and Christie enter with the hopes of saving Christie's grandfather. He also a playable character in Tekken 7, where it is revealed that even with the Zaibatsu's technology, it is still unable to cure his master's illness, with his passing causes Eddy to resign from the Zaibatsu and continue his vengeful quest against Kazuya on his own, while remaining on good term with Jin.

Eddy returns as a DLC character in Tekken 8, revealing that Eddy is outmatched against Kazuya during his failed assault at G Corporation, until Yoshimitsu rescued him in time, and guided him to meet someone he once knew in the past ten years, allowing Eddy to discard his vengeance and vow to save every survivor from Kazuya's tyranny. The said childhood friend is none other than the current Polish Prime Minister, Lidia Sobieka. During Tekken 8, while joining forces with Jin's side against Kazuya, it is revealed four months before the tournament that Eddy and Yoshimitsu are leading the surviving Tekken Force soldiers from the assault of G Corporation led by his former colleague, Nina Williams, whom Kazuya hired after he supposedly killed Heihachi Mishima at the end of Tekken 7. Once the Tekken Force survivors are rescued without casualties, he and Yoshimitsu accompanies Lidia to the Tekken Monks' base, where they accept their request to rehabilitate a now amnesiac Heihachi. However, at the same time both Jin and Kazuya lost their Devil Gene during their final fight, Eddy, Lidia and Yoshimitsu fails to save the monks from being killed by Heihachi, when he regain the memory of his evil-self during his final trial.

=== Gameplay ===
Eddy is known for his Capoeira fighting style and easily chainable attacks. BradyGames, in 2009, attributed the "button masher" stigma to Eddy's "constantly shifting stances and unpredictable nature" in regards to casual gameplay of Tekken 6, while in competition the random actions of button mashing" lead to heavy punishment more often than not." In Tekken 8, Eddy's usual gameplay style is modified to include a "Mandinga" function, a feature exclusive to him, allowing him to gain access to additional attacks. Pete Dreyer at Red Bull listed Eddy among the "cheapest" fighting game characters, stating "The problem was that because of his style and his multiple stances, if you didn't recognise his moves and what they did, there was absolutely no way to know what was going on, and every time you thought you could get in a punch, you'd get a swift kick in the face."

== In other media and merchandise ==
In the 1997 original video animation Tekken: The Motion Picture, Eddy is seen during the opening introduction. In the 2011 CGI film Tekken: Blood Vengeance, Eddy's dossier is briefly seen when Anna Williams opens a file containing dossiers on various persons of interest.

In the 2009 live-action film Tekken, Eddy is portrayed by Brazilian capoeira fighter/stuntman Lateef Crowder. He participates in the Iron Fist tournament and is pitted against Raven, who defeats Eddy. Critics praised the accurate portrayal of Eddy toward the games, but criticized the brevity of Eddy's role in the film. Unlike the games, he has no relation to Christie Monteiro.

In 2003, Epoch Co. released an Eddy Gordo action figure as part of their Tekken Tag Tournament toyline; the toy featured interchangeable hands and a display stand.

== Reception ==
Complex ranked Eddy as the seventeenth-"Most Dominant Fighting Game Character", commenting "You either think this dancing brawler is the greatest thing to happen to Tekken or you think he's the cheesiest character in the entire series." In early 1998, Electronic Gaming Monthly reported that Eddy Gordo was "the current fan favorite" of the Tekken 3 cast. In the official poll by Namco Bandai Games, Eddy was ranked as the ninth most requested Tekken character to be playable in Tekken X Street Fighter, at 10% of votes.

The character has been criticized for his perceived simplistic playability. MTV.com nicknamed him "Eddy 'Button-Masher's Savior' Gordo." Luke McKinney of GameSpy lambasted Eddy as "the worst thing to happen to fighting gamers since repetitive strain injury" and likened him to "Jar Jar Binks, a floppy-limbed aberration staining a beloved classic." Dave Cook of NowGamer rated Eddy among his "10 most hated game characters ever" at tenth in 2010: "Eddy shouldn't even have a command list, just pictures of both kick buttons, because if you hammer both endlessly, you will win every round." Pete Dreyer of RedBull.com included Eddy in his selection of the "10 Cheapest Fighting Game Characters of All Time" for similar reasons in 2016: "Just start mashing those kick buttons until his legs start capoeira-ing all over the place and rake in the glory." In his 2014 article "In Defense of Button Mashing", Kevin Wong of Kotaku explained his success at Tekken 3 with Eddy after having struggled playing as other characters: "I won't gild the lily by claiming any sort of thought out strategy. It was definitely button mashing, but I had never had so much fun."

Eddy's hairstyle in Tekken 8 has received some controversy as being "so overused in recent works of fiction in what has become a reductive trope for men of color in the industry." Inverse felt that Eddy's and Heihachi's absence of the initial game was felt until the trailer that promoted them. Vandal commented that Eddy's new design divided the fanbase due to his new haircut as it came across as a generic character and come across as similar to actor Michael B. Jordan. However, the fact that he retains his classic look as an alternative resulted in a comment from Vandal as a positive for the one wanting such take. VG427 lamented that early trailers did not show Eddy's gameplay but they enjoyed the motion capture given to the character's model as it helped to further detail his fighting style as well as facial expressions. Destructoid noted that Eddy was a fan-favorite since his introduction due to how he continues having a role in the story and is still playable alongside Christie uses a similar fighting style, making his return in Tekken 8 welcome. In retrospect, PCGamer called Eddy as easy for newcomers as "The guy your pal who's never touched a fighting game picks and mashes their way to victory with." and that Eddy keeps being as easy to play as in previous installments which attracted criticism from players in Reddit who claimed Eddy continues being easy to use in Tekken 8 against skilled players.

=== Cultural impact ===
In a 2009 interview, professional wrestler Kofi Kingston stated that "guys like Eddy Gordo are very unique characters. When he was introduced into the Tekken series he was the guy everybody was talking about. People knew about Capoeira but they didn't really know what it was all about as far as moves and stuff." He also stated, "I watch a character like Eddy Gordo in 'Tekken' and his capoeira style, and its characters like that that I like to take from because of how they stand out." Fellow pro wrestler MVP called Eddy Gordo one of his favorite video game characters, and attributed his "Malicious Intent" in-ring move to the character, calling it "a variation of one of his spinning kicks." On the track "Struck By a Vehicle" from his 2005 album Retaliation, Dane Cook joked that someone being struck by a car "sends you flipping through the air like Eddy Gordo from Tekken when someone doesn't know how to do combos and they're just hitting the buttons randomly."
