= Michelle and Julia Chang =

Tekken characters

- Left: Michelle in Tekken Tag Tournament 2 (2011), and her daughter Julia as depicted in Tekken 6 (2007).
- First game: Michelle: Tekken (1994); Julia: Tekken 3 (1997)
- Voiced by: Michelle: Jessica Robertson (Tekken: The Motion Picture, English); Narumi Hidaka (Tekken: The Motion Picture, Japanese); Julia: Hiromi Tsuru (Tekken 3); Annie Wood (Street Fighter X Tekken, English); Seiko Yoshida (Street Fighter X Tekken, Tekken: Bloodline, Japanese); Jeannie Tirado (Tekken: Bloodline, English)
- Motion capture: Katsuhiro Harada (partial)

Michelle Chang (Japanese: ミシェール・チャン, Hepburn: Mishēru Chan) is a character in the Tekken series centered on fighting games by Bandai Namco. She was introduced in the original Tekken (1994) as a Chinese-Native American woman possessing a pendant capable of controlling evil powers. The pendant was problematic in Michelle's life, causing her father's death and her kidnappings. She is the adoptive mother of Julia Chang (Japanese: ジュリア・チャン, Hepburn: Juria Chan), who acts as a successor to her and masters her discipline. Michelle is omitted from the canonical games after Tekken 2 (1995) but continues to appear in the series' other-related media.

Julia was introduced and took the place of Michelle from Tekken 3 (1997), in which she was portrayed in the role of rescuing Michelle. Onwards, she became a researcher and took on the responsibility of the reforestation of her homeland to reduce environmental problems. Julia also possesses an alternative personality known as Jaycee (Japanese: ジェイシー, Hepburn: Jeishī), who is in alignment with lucha libre professional wrestling. Michelle, along with Julia, has been heavily criticized for being cited as a representative of Native Americans across the video game industry.

Michelle was voiced by Jessica Robertson in English and Narumi Hidaka in Japanese for the 1998 animated film Tekken: The Motion Picture. On the other hand, Julia, for her first appearance in Tekken 3, was voiced by Hiromi Tsuru. In Street Fighter X Tekken, Julia was voiced by Annie Wood in English and Seiko Yoshida in Japanese. Yoshida continued to voice Julia in Japanese for the 2022 anime Tekken: Bloodline, while Jeannie Tirado provided the English voice for the same production. Some of the Motion capture for both characters was performed by Katsuhiro Harada during the 1990s.

== Conception and design ==
Michelle debuted in the original Tekken as a young woman of Chinese and Native American descent with a pendant believed to control evil powers. Some of the character's early motion capture was performed by series producer Katsuhiro Harada and replaced as development progressed. With Tekken 3's release, the development team progressed the series' timeline by nineteen years and chose to replace Michelle with Julia Chang, her adopted daughter. They designed her with a similar look to Michelle to retain that character's "healthy charm", but they also wanted to emphasize her intellect, for which they gave her glasses. In Tekken 5, customization was made available, allowing further personalization of Julia's distinctive style. Julia has also been involved in multiple professions, including archaeology, research, professional wrestling, and live-streaming.

According to Harada, fighting games of the 1990s had to convey a character's identity quickly due to time limitations and polygon restrictions, which influenced character designs to "express individuality". For Michelle and Julia, Namco drew inspiration from Native American culture, incorporating elements such as war bonnets (consisting of eagle feathers) to reflect their heritage. However, after receiving feedback from a Native American fan regarding Julia's feather headband—viewed by some as a stereotype—Harada recognized the challenge of balancing cultural expression with avoiding such harmful portrayals. He suggested that more intense character depth could easily be achieved in narrative-driven games in comparison to fighting games due to the limited time invested.

In Tekken Tag Tournament 2, the character Jaycee was introduced. A female lucha libre wrestling character who is revealed to be Julia under an alias. When working on the franchise, Harada noticed that while Julia had a high usage rate amongst players, she lacked feedback in contrast to how other female characters in the series were received. He feared her popularity may decline if players only focused on the character's gameplay and used the opportunity to introduce new elements for her character and encourage discussion. As Jaycee, Julia wears a white and pink wrestling leotard and mask that obscures her face with feather-like protrusions on the sides, and white boots and gloves. In addition, Japanese illustrator Mutsumi Inomata designed an alternative costume for Jaycee.

== Appearances ==
In the original Tekken, Michelle's father was killed by Heihachi Mishima's men for failing to retrieve a treasure. Seeking revenge, Michelle takes part in the Iron Fist tournament. In Tekken 2, she seeks her kidnapped mother from Kazuya Mishima's subordinates, who have learned the pendant's secret. Michelle later adopts a girl named Julia and trains her for self-defense. When Michelle disappears while investigating her pendant's connection to the creature Ogre, Julia enters Tekken 3 to rescue her. The two are reunited in conclusion. Afterwards in the storyline, Julia mainly focused on reforesting her homeland. Michelle is also present in the spin-offs, such as Tekken Tag Tournament and Tekken Tag Tournament 2, as well as in the animation Tekken: The Motion Picture. Companies including Tsukuda Hobby and Banpresto have made her action figures.

Besides Julia's mainline appearances in Tekken 3, Tekken 4, Tekken 5, Tekken 6, and Tekken 7, she has also appeared in various Tekken spin-offs, including Tekken Tag Tournament, Tekken Card Challenge, Tekken Tag Tournament 2 (as Jaycee), Tekken 3D: Prime Edition, Street Fighter X Tekken, and Tekken Revolution (as Jaycee). Additionally, Julia has been featured in the anime Tekken: Bloodline and in Namco's marketing. Several companies, such as Kazya, Brovo Company, Heihachi Zazen, Diamond Select Toys, and Kotobukiya, have produced her figurines. Gameplay-wise, Michelle is fast-paced and can easily execute combos. She can also perform damaging counters and has a large moveset useful for combos. However, she can be hard to play. Julia shares a similar playstyle to Michelle, characterized by her speed.

== Critical reception ==
The New York Times "Game Theory" columnist J.C. Herz examined Michelle's design as a "confused mixture of signs", observing her Asian name with Western facial features, such as her nose and "almond-shaped" eyes. Herz said that these traits make her a "perfect metaphor of video games". Other critics also noted Michelle's hybridized nature. In a discussion about representation in video games on BBC Radio 4, one Native American participant shared her experience with the character of Michelle, upset with how she was stereotyped as a Native American, arguing that this kind of portrayal could especially harm Native Americans' reputation. Similar to this, another Native American individual expressed criticism over the feather headband worn by Julia and supported their critique with photographs showcasing the clothing styles of their Native American friends.

Samuel Martínez Linares from the National University of Distance Education explained how Tekken depicts Michelle's ties to her heritage and culture in stereotypical ways, specifically citing her magical pendant. He felt that the game designers failed to represent Native American heritage with "depth and consistency". Linares also draws attention to the similarities between Michelle and Julia, both in terms of their physical appearance and the sexualized nature of their portrayals, linking this to the high rate of sexual assaults against Native American women, a significant portion of which are committed by non-Native American men. Linares references an analyst, Fabius, who suggests that such sexualization of Native American women can be seen as a reflection of ongoing colonialist attitudes within Western society.

Japanese magazine Jugemu cited Michelle's outfit as an example of how ethnic attire can elevate a character's appearance, describing it as combining the traditional beauty of her homeland with casual fashion. They further praised how her headband and fringes helped to create a "uniquely wild look". Meanwhile, the staff of Chinese magazine Gamer described Julia's outfit in Tekken 5 as an example of "vintage" attire, in how it combined older elements with a more modern look. They further felt elements such as her headband helped give her an exotic flair, and pointed to how Native American headwear had become popular among Hollywood actors at the time such as Julia Roberts. Additional praise was given to how her outfit expressed the different elements of her multicultural background, providing a presentation that was both ethnic and fashionable.

According to Gavin Jasper from Den of Geek, Julia was initially depicted as no more than a duplicate of Michelle, with a dull storyline centered on "nature crap". Jasper noted that while Capcom managed to make Julia more interesting by giving her character some depth, Namco further complicated her concept by introducing the luchadora gimmick in Tekken Tag Tournament 2. In contrast, Jasper criticized Michelle as a "forgettable" character with a weak personality and simplistic game endings that "are a cure for insomnia", mentioning that her only redeeming feature was her duo with Julia in Tekken Tag Tournament 2. As specified by Kyle Picknell, a critic from JOE, no one played as Julia in Tekken 3, a point he emphasizes by referencing an image of Julia representing darkness and stating that even this minor indication of her presence irritated him.
