= Tekken Card Challenge =

1999 video game

- Developer: Namco
- Publisher: Bandai
- Producer: Katsuhiro Harada
- Series: Tekken
- Platform: WonderSwan
- Release: JP: June 17, 1999
- Genre: Fighting
- Modes: Single player, multiplayer

Tekken Card Challenge (鉄拳カードチャレンジ, Tekken Kādocharenji) is a Tekken video game released for the WonderSwan. It uses the characters from Tekken 3, including an exclusive playable character to the game, Crow, which previously appeared as NPCs in the original.

== Gameplay ==
Tekken Card Challenge utilizes a system similar to its Pokémon counterpart. Two opponents are to fight at a time, with various cards for different maneuvers and a 100-point HP total for damage accumulation. The player begins with a hand of four cards, drawing more as the duel proceeds. The battle system is similar to Yu-Gi-Oh! in that the three types of cards perform in a rock, paper, and scissors pattern. Attack cards are played against each other to compare values with the loser being discarded and deducting HP, an attack card played against a defense nullifies each other (except in the case of a counter), and two block cards cancel each other out. There is also a minor system of air juggling, which can be quite damaging given the correct order of cards.

Tekken Card Challenge also provides the player with a variety of game modes. There is a link mode present, 1-player battle, and (the main mode) Adventure, which allows the player to unlock more characters and duel opponents. In adventure mode, the player is given movement of a character sprite in a full environment taken place on a 15 x 15 square grid to traverse. The point of each stage is to defeat each "duelist" given limited number of steps and gain entrance to the exit.

== Characters ==
=== Default characters ===
- Hwoarang ^{a}
- Jin Kazama
- Ling Xiaoyu

^a Unlockable if not selected in Adventure Mode

=== Unlockable characters ===
- Anna Williams
- Bryan Fury
- Crow
- Dr. Bosconovitch
- Eddy Gordo
- Forest Law
- GUN JACK
- Heihachi Mishima
- Julia Chang
- King II
- Kuma II
- Lei Wulong
- Mokujin
- Nina Williams
- Ogre
- Panda
- Paul Phoenix
- Yoshimitsu

=== Unplayable character ===
- True Ogre

== Reception ==
Marc Nix of IGN noted that while the WonderSwan console was only released in Japan, all of "Japan's top tier developers are rolling out their most famous franchises in handheld form" including Tekken. Nix commented that Tekken Card Challenge "may not quite be what you were looking for in a Tekken game, but all of your favorite Tekken battlers are present for hand-to-hand combat" where combat is represented by "battle cards" instead of "flying fists". He compared the game to SNK vs. Capcom: Card Fighters' Clash (released on Neo Geo Pocket Color) and Pokémon Trading Card Game (released on Game Boy Color), noting that it "adds new depth to the gameplay of these types games by adding a story mode" and having a large character roster where each character has "a different storyline and ending". He also highlighted the "Two-Player and Link Mode" gameplay options – "Link Mode is the more expansive and interesting mode, as this feature allows you to use the cards and characters you've unlocked in the Adventure mode for combat against a sucker buddy".
