= Death by Degrees =

2005 video game

- Developer: Namco
- Publishers: JP: Namco; NA: Namco Hometek; EU: Sony Computer Entertainment
- Producer: Youzou Sakagami
- Composer: Kazuhiro Nakamura
- Series: Tekken
- Platform: PlayStation 2
- Release: JP: January 27, 2005; NA: February 8, 2005; AU: April 14, 2005; EU: April 15, 2005
- Genres: Action-adventure, beat 'em up
- Mode: Single-player

Tekken's Nina Williams in: Death by Degrees, known in Japan as Death by Degrees Tekken: Nina Williams (デス バイ ディグリーズ 鉄拳：ニーナ ウィリアムズ, Desu bai Digurīzu Tekken: Nīna Wiriamuzu), is a 2005 action-adventure video game developed and published by Namco for the PlayStation 2. It is a spin-off of Namco's Tekken series of fighting games. It was originally announced with the title Nina.

== Gameplay ==
The game is fully controlled by the analog sticks. The left analog stick is touch-sensitive; through various degrees of holding, tapping or pressing along with other buttons allows the player character Nina Williams to walk, run or evade. The right analog stick is used for offensive moves.

The game's most remarkable feature is the ability to allow Nina to use her martial arts skills to break the bones of her enemies through use of carefully aimed attacks. These attacks do more damage to the enemy and show the player the damage being inflicted on the opponent's skeletal structure. Strangely, this does little to actually disable opponents, as they may continue to use shattered limbs and survive destructive blows to the head.

Once the game is completed, "Anna Mode" will be unlocked, offering the player the ability to play as Nina's younger sibling and rival, Anna Williams. Various outfits can be unlocked throughout the game, which include a bikini, cocktail dress, purple jumpsuit, black and silver stealth suit. Playing the game a second time causes LCD crates throughout the game to contain infinite supplies of certain weapons, such as infinite katana and infinite rail-gun.

After completing the game twice, the wrestling costume as seen in the opening FMV is also unlocked. A third clear game file additionally unlocks "Tekken 2 Nina", which instead of an outfit is actually a different facial and bodily construction, exactly as she appears in the Tekken title, in low resolution.

== Plot ==
Nina Williams, world-renowned assassin, has been hired by the CIA and MI6 to join a team that is attempting to infiltrate "Kometa," a notorious criminal organization. The team's strategy involves gaining access to the target through a fighting tournament being held on the "Amphitrite," a luxury cruise ship owned and operated by Kometa. A leaked video on the Internet showed a Kometa ship exploding within the Bermuda Triangle, and it is feared that they are working on some kind of superweapon in the aftermath of the fall of the Soviet Union. Nina's official cover involves infiltration as a competitor in the tournament. However, Nina is also the team's "sweeper"; should her partners fail, she must finish the job. Nina enters the competition but is quickly discovered and captured. She soon receives a communication informing her of the team's failure and the death of one of the agents named John Doe (killed by Kometa executive Edgar Grant), and that she must now conduct the operation herself.

Nina must fight her way through Kometa's forces and expose the truth behind its criminal activities. As she progresses in her mission, Nina fights the Kometa's top executives, starting with the personal bodyguard and lover of Lana Lei, Bryce Adams. She then moves on to photograph a meeting of the directors, with the help of MI6 agent Alan Smithee.

Nina barely escapes the cruise ship with her life and is taken to a Kometa Island research facility. Here, she encounters Lukas Hayes, a scientist who informs her about Kometa's plan to use satellites to heat and activate methane hydrate on the ocean floor. The result is bubbling, which causes ships to lose their buoyancy. The weapon thus has the power to destroy naval vehicles from afar, sinking them to the bottom of the sea. Hayes' plan was to find a new energy source and alternative to fossil fuels, but his research was twisted into a form of warfare. The project is Salacia, the mysterious operation CIA and MI6 have heard rumors of. Nina realizes that she must stop the project, and takes on the second Kometa executive, Enrique Ortega. However, he is joined by Anna Williams (Nina's sister), hired along with the Tekken Force as bodyguards. After briefly engaging in combat with Anna, Nina continues on her mission and after Enrique's conversation on video link with the head of the Mishima Zaibatsu, Heihachi Mishima, Nina manages to kill Enrique. Lukas Hayes, however, is also killed as Lana Lei arrives and recovers a case which houses the electronics to operate Salacia's satellites. With Alan's help, Nina escapes the base by helicopter, chasing Lana Lei back to the luxury cruise ship.

For a second time, Nina must fight her way through the Kometa boat, only this time against advanced cyborg soldiers, another of Lei's weapons projects. After recovering the keys to her quarters, Nina finds Salacia and engages with Lana. After her defeat, they are interrupted by Alan, who is revealed as Kometa executive Edgar Grant. Shooting Lana, he acknowledges that he is also a sweeper, there to destroy all evidence of his part in the atrocities. Before he can kill Nina, however, Lana shoots him dead and escapes to a secret room. There, Nina witnesses her powering Salacia, targeting methane hydrate pockets all around the United States coastline. Nina finishes Lana off before she can continue with her insane plan, and makes her way to an escape pod as a self-destruct mode is activated on the boat. Her pod, however, explodes, and Nina lands on the ship's edge. As a rescue helicopter comes for her, she is knocked down by none other than Anna Williams. The two sisters face off as the ship nears destruction and almost both fall to their deaths. However, the two grudgingly work together to escape and grab the helicopter rope line, with Nina having a flashback to the events before her father's death, in particular, the moments following when the two sisters comforted one another. Anna drops Nina into the ocean after saying that they are now even. Nina watches on as rescue boats approach from behind her, the Kometa ship exploding and sinking, as Anna leaves on the helicopter.

== Reception ==
Reception

Aggregate score
Aggregator	Score
Metacritic	51/100

Review scores
Publication	Score
Edge	5/10
Electronic Gaming Monthly	5.33/10
Eurogamer	3/10
Famitsu	29/40
Game Informer	5.5/10
GamePro	2.5/5
GameRevolution	C−
GameSpot	5.6/10
GameSpy	3/5
GameZone	5.9/10
IGN	5/10
Official U.S. PlayStation Magazine	1.5/5
Maxim	4/10
The Sydney Morning Herald	3.5/5

Death by Degrees received mixed reviews from critics. While the cutscenes and depth of story were praised, critics generally found fault with camera controls, extensive loading times, and fighting controls, which limited all fighting sequences to use of the analog stick, which in many games, is used instead to control the camera. In Japan, Famitsu gave it a score of 29 out of 40.

== See also ==
- Mortal Kombat: Shaolin Monks, another beat 'em up spinoff title from a popular fighting game series, which was released the same year.
