= Tekken Revolution =

2013 fighting video game

- Developer: Namco Bandai Games
- Publisher: Namco Bandai Games
- Director: Yuichi Yuremori
- Producer: Katsuhiro Harada
- Composers: Taku Inoue; Rio Hamamoto
- Series: Tekken
- Platform: PlayStation 3
- Release: NA: June 11, 2013; JP: June 12, 2013; EU: June 12, 2013
- Genre: Fighting
- Modes: Single-player, multiplayer

Tekken Revolution (Note: Japanese: 鉄拳レボリューション, Hepburn: Tekken Reboryūshon) was a free-to-play fighting video game developed and published by Namco Bandai Games. It was released on the PlayStation 3 via the PlayStation Store in June 2013. It is the first game in the Tekken franchise to be made free-to-play and the first to be released exclusively in digital format. It is no longer available in Europe as of 2016.

The game ceased operations on March 20, 2017.

== Gameplay ==
Tekken Revolution, by and large, is a modification of Tekken Tag Tournament 2 without the 2 vs. 2 tag team format, reusing assets like backgrounds and character models from that game (although it has a new soundtrack). It introduces various new mechanics, such as Special Arts and Critical Arts moves designed to help new players. Bound, the mechanic where characters can be staggered to allow more chance to inflict additional attacks has mostly been removed; the only way to activate it is by breaking or falling through environments. Movement has been revamped, particularly in the way characters walk backwards (prior to Revolution, back walking was a slow shuffle but is now a more nimble stride away from the adversary; the new backwards walk animation would carry over to Tekken 7). For the first time in the Tekken series, a stat-upgrade feature is implemented, in which players can spend Skill Points (4 are awarded every time you level up) to increase the player's character's: Power (attack strength); Endurance (health gauge) and; Vigor (chance of landing a critical hit or entering a Rage state, determined by the difference between you and your opponent's Vigor). While the stats are compulsorily applied in Arcade Mode and Ranked Matches, an option to disable them in Player Matches is available through an update.

Series staple modes, such as Arcade mode return, where players battle against AI opponents, as well as Online Mode, where players battle each other through online Ranked and Player matches. Practice mode (known as "Warm-up Mode" in-game), which was absent during launch, was eventually added in a major update released a month after launch. The game also introduces a new temporary mode, "Mokujin Rush", accessible only as part of event promotions, which allows players to battle Mokujin-type enemies (including his palette swaps Tetsujin and Kinjin) and obtain higher rewards than usual battles. A new gimmick, "Turbo Rush" is applied to the mode every so often, where the battles will be sped up, allowing for a more fast-paced combat.

== Characters ==
There are a total of 29 playable fighters in the game, twelve of whom are part of the launch cast with eight being available by default. Nearly all of them are returning characters, although the game also introduces two newcomers, the vampire Eliza, who is unlockable by collecting "Blood Seals" through battles, and Kinjin, who only appears as an unplayable boss character, alongside Heihachi Mishima, Jinpachi Mishima, Mokujin, Tetsujin, and Ogre (or a golden version of him). Characters beyond the initial twelve were added periodically in a span of eight months; the last character update was Jaycee, who was made playable beginning on February 13, 2014. It was first main spin-off game of Tekken to not feature Yoshimitsu and not making Heihachi Mishima, since the arcade version of the first Tekken game, playable, making Nina Williams and Paul Phoenix the only 2 characters to be playable in all main spin-off versions of Tekken.

=== New characters ===
- Eliza ^{a} ^{b}: A 1000+ years vampire with chronic narcolepsy.
- Kinjin ^{b} ^{c}: A gold version of Mokujin and Tetsujin. Wears a glasses, a cape, and a crown.

=== Recurring characters ===
- Alisa Bosconovitch ^{a}
- Armor King II ^{a} ^{b}
- Asuka Kazama
- Bob Richards ^{a} ^{b}
- Bryan Fury ^{a}
- Christie Monteiro ^{a} ^{b}
- Devil Jin ^{a} ^{b}
- Feng Wei ^{a} ^{b}
- Heihachi Mishima ^{c}
- Hwoarang ^{a} ^{b}
- JACK-6
- Jaycee ^{a} ^{b}
- Jin Kazama ^{a} ^{b}
- Jinpachi Mishima ^{c}
- Jun Kazama ^{a} ^{b}
- Kazuya Mishima / Devil Kazuya ^{d}
- King II
- Kuma II ^{a} ^{b}
- Kunimitsu ^{a} ^{b}
- Lars Alexandersson
- Lee Chaolan ^{a} ^{b}
- Leo Kliesen ^{a}
- Lili De Rochefort
- Ling Xiaoyu ^{a} ^{b}
- Marshall Law
- Miguel Caballero Rojo ^{a} ^{b}
- Mokujin ^{b} ^{c}
- Nina Williams ^{a} ^{b}
- True Ogre ^{c}
- Paul Phoenix
- Sergei Dragunov ^{a} ^{b}
- Steve Fox ^{a}
- Tetsujin ^{b} ^{c}

^a Unlockable
^b Post-release addition
^c Unplayable character
^d In-battle transformation

== Reception ==
Reception

Aggregate score
Aggregator	Score
Metacritic	70/100

Review scores
Publication	Score
Edge	6/10
GamesMaster	69%
IGN	7.5/10
PlayStation Official Magazine – Australia	80%

Tekken Revolution received mixed reviews. Edge noted its attempt to bring the series close to its arcade roots, but criticized it as a watered-down version of Tekken Tag Tournament 2 and its "pay-to-win" nature. Gamesmaster also stated "There's plenty to play with here, but you'll have to pay to win online." PlayStation Official Magazine – Australia enjoyed the game, concluding "It's just like being back in the arcades (with lots of Japanese kids kicking your arse)." Despite the mixed reception, Katsuhiro Harada confirmed that Tekken Revolution was downloaded over 2 million times.

== See also ==
- Dead or Alive 5 Ultimate: Core Fighters, another free-to-play fighting game released in September 2013.
- Stop Killing Games, a consumer movement to preserve video games after they are taken offline
