= Lost Reavers =

2015 video game

- Developer: Bandai Namco Studios
- Publisher: Bandai Namco Entertainment
- Producer: Katsuhiro Harada
- Engine: Unreal Engine 3
- Platform: Wii U
- Release: JP: December 2, 2015; WW: April 28, 2016
- Genre: Action role-playing
- Mode: Multiplayer

Lost Reavers (ロストリーバース, Rosuto Rībāsu) was a free-to-play multiplayer online game developed and published by Bandai Namco for the Wii U. The game was distributed via Nintendo eShop, and took advantage of the Nintendo Network. A public beta test was being held in Japan from September 3rd until September 13th, followed by the title's commercial release on December 2nd, 2015. The game also released internationally on April 28th, 2016. As of May 30th, 2019, the game's servers have been shut down.

On September 23rd, 2016, a piece of software was downloaded onto most Wii U user's systems called "Lost Reavers NOTICE". Its icon was the icon for Lost Reavers, inside of a gift box. When the software was opened, it redirected you to the Nintendo eShop page for Lost Reavers. Due to the Wii U eShop's servers being shut down on March 27th, 2023, this software no longer functions properly.

== Gameplay ==
In-game screenshot

During any given session, four players assumed the roles of four characters - Sayuri, Dwayne, Victoria, and ShadowStalker - working cooperatively in missions to raid multi-roomed maps and recover treasure known as Relics. Players faced against waves of various undead monsters, such as giant bosses, in order to clear rooms, solve various puzzles, and move Relics to a certain point. Whilst recovering a Relic, one player taking the responsibility would be vulnerable, and had to depend on the team for protection. There was a play style system in defeating and defending from monsters called a "Multi-View Action System", including melee attacks, third-person shooting (trailing and over-the-shoulder), and first-person shooting. In the case one or more players fell, they could depend on their teammates for recovery. If all four players fell, then the mission would be failed. To clear any mission, the Relic had to reach a certain point on the map, or the players had to defeat a boss.

The game also featured events similar to most free-to-play games, such as getting higher EXP for finishing missions during the first 2 weeks of the game being out.

== Development ==
The game was announced on January 14th, 2015, under its tentative title Project Treasure, via that month's Nintendo Direct presentation in all major regions. Producer Katsuhiro Harada was featured in a segment opening up about a game they were working on exclusively for Wii U. The game was a free-to-play online, four-player co-operative action title which any Wii U owner with a Nintendo Network ID could download and join in, provided their console was always online. According to Harada, "four players could work together to complete varied stages" and "[the] basic aim is to clear traps, rout enemies, and seize treasure." Harada then concluded he was unable to disclose the game's official title or release date at that time, but he gave away the tentative title being "Project Treasure" and confirmed "[they are] working very hard on it." The segment closed hinting the game was coming soon.

Throughout the announcement segment, an array image featuring four different characters was teased, and no actual footage of the game was shown. On May 31st, 2015, during the Japanese Nintendo Direct presentation, Nintendo released a gameplay trailer, featuring four unique characters fighting zombies in fast-paced melee combat within a labyrinth to find the treasure. The trailer concluded teasing that more information on the game would be revealed in the vague summer window of 2015. A day later, Nintendo of America released the English version of the same teaser trailer following their Nintendo Direct Micro.

On August 28th, 2015, Bandai Namco Entertainment officially launched the game's Japanese website and released a new trailer, revealing the game's final title as Lost Reavers, as well as many other details, such as that the game was powered by Unreal Engine. Japanese Wii U owners were able to participate in a public beta run between September the 3rd and 13th, after which the title was released commercially on December 2nd, 2015. An open beta of the English version of the game was released on April 14th, 2016, and ran until April 26th, 2016. The game officially released world-wide on April 28th 2016.

== Reception ==
Lost Reavers received "generally unfavorable reviews" from critics, garnering an aggregate score of 46/100 on review aggregator Metacritic.

Reception

Aggregate score
Aggregator	Score
Metacritic	Wii U: 46/100

Review score
Publication	Score
Nintendo Life	Wii U: 5/10
