= Tekken =

Fighting video game series

- Logo used since Tekken 8
- Genres: Fighting; Beat 'em up
- Developers: Bandai Namco Studios; Namco
- Publishers: Bandai Namco Entertainment; Namco; Sony Computer Entertainment
- Creator: Seiichi Ishii
- Composers: Yoshie Arakawa; Yoshie Takayanagi; Shinji Hosoe; Nobuyoshi Sano; Keiichi Okabe; Akitaka Tohyama; Yuu Miyake; Taku Inoue; Yusuke Yamauchi
- Platforms: Android; Arcade; Game Boy Advance; iOS; Microsoft Windows; Nintendo 3DS; Nintendo Switch 2; PlayStation; PlayStation 2; PlayStation 3; PlayStation 4; PlayStation 5; PlayStation Portable; Wii U; Xbox 360; Xbox One; Xbox Series X/S
- First release: Tekken; December 9, 1994
- Latest release: Tekken 8 January 26, 2024

Tekken (Japanese: 鉄拳(てっけん); 'Iron Fist') is a Japanese media franchise centred on a series of fighting games developed and published by Bandai Namco Entertainment (formerly Namco). It also includes film and print adaptations.

The main games in the series follow the events of the King of Iron Fist Tournament, hosted by the Mishima Zaibatsu, where players control a plethora of characters to win the tournament and gain control of the company; the conflict between the Mishima family serves as the main focus of the series' plot, while players explore other characters' motivations in aiming to control the Zaibatsu.

Gameplay focuses on hand-to-hand combat with an opponent, with the gameplay system including blocks, throws, escapes, and ground fighting. The series later introduced combos and special moves, with characters also able to stage break arenas. Tekken is noted as being one of the first fighting games at the time to use 3D animation.

Japanese video game developer Namco began the series in 1994, with the release of the self-titled first entry. As of 2017, it has nine additional entries, eight spin-off games, and has been adapted into three feature films and other media. Tekken 2, as well as the third game Tekken 3, are considered landmark titles; they received critical acclaim for their gameplay and more immersive experience. Subsequent titles have followed this concept and received generally positive critical responses. It has been mentioned as early as 2015 by the Guinness Book of World Records as the longest running story in video games without reboots, retcons, or revisions. The Mishima saga covering the first ten games until Tekken 8 was described as a story revolving around the Iron Fist Tournament and a family aiming to destroy each other.

The series has been universally acclaimed and commercially successful, having shipped over 61 million copies by 2025, making it the third best-selling fighting game franchise. The main series has been widely credited by critics and video game publications for raising the standards of fighting games and praised for its gameplay mechanics and replay value.

== Games ==
All major installments were released as arcade games, except for Tekken 8, and the boards used to run them have traditionally been based on PlayStation hardware. Following their release in arcades, home releases in the series have mainly been for consoles in the PlayStation line.

| Year | Title | Arcade board | Home release |
|---|---|---|---|
| 1994 | Tekken (Note: Arcade version re-released and included in the home version of Tekken 5.) (Note: Re-released on the PlayStation 3 via the PlayStation Network as part of the PSone Classics line on June 3, 2011.) | Namco System 11 | PlayStation |
| 1995 | Tekken 2 (Note: Re-released on the PlayStation Portable and PlayStation 3 via the PlayStation Network as part of the PSone Classics line on December 4, 2006 and May 3, 2007, respectively, as well as on the PlayStation Vita.) (Note: Re-released for the Zeebo via 3G in Brazil and Mexico on October 8 and November 4, 2009, respectively.) | Namco System 11 | PlayStation |
| 1997 | Tekken 3 | Namco System 12 | PlayStation |
| 1999 | Tekken Tag Tournament (Note: Remastered in HD as part of the Tekken Hybrid package for the PlayStation 3 on November 22, 2011.) | Namco System 12 | PlayStation 2 |
| 2001 | Tekken 4 | Namco System 246 | PlayStation 2 |
| 2004 | Tekken 5 | Namco System 256 | PlayStation 2 |
| 2005 | Tekken 5: Dark Resurrection (Note: Re-released on the PlayStation 3 via the PlayStation Network on December 12, 2006; updated with an online component and renamed Tekken 5: Dark Resurrection Online on August 1, 2007.) | Namco System 256 | PlayStation 3, PlayStation Portable |
| 2007 | Tekken 6 (Note: Scaled down version released for the PlayStation Portable on November 24, 2009.) | Namco System 357 | PlayStation 3, PlayStation Portable, Xbox 360 |
| 2011 | Tekken Tag Tournament 2 | Namco System 369 | PlayStation 3, Xbox 360, Wii U |
| 2015 | Tekken 7 | Namco System ES3 | PlayStation 4, Xbox One, Microsoft Windows |
| 2024 | Tekken 8 | N/A | PlayStation 5, Xbox Series, Microsoft Windows |

=== Main series ===
==== Tekken ====
The first game in the series, Tekken, was released in 1994, first as an arcade game and as a port for the PlayStation in 1995. The game features eight playable characters, each with their own sub-boss. The PlayStation version features remixes of the stage themes and also made the sub-bosses playable for a total of eighteen characters, including a costume swap for Kazuya (Devil Kazuya). In addition, a cutscene is unlocked when the player finishes arcade mode with each of the original eight characters. The canon ending of the game consists of Kazuya exacting revenge on his father Heihachi Mishima, beating him in the tournament and tossing him off the same cliff that he was thrown off by Heihachi.

==== Tekken 2 ====
Tekken 2 was released in 1995 in arcades and in 1996 for the PlayStation. A port was also made several years later for Zeebo. There are ten playable characters as well as fifteen to unlock, for a total of twenty-five characters. The home version features four new modes that would become staples to the series, which were Survival, Team Battle, Time Attack, and Practice. The game features remixes of the arcade versions' characters' themes, and a cutscene unlocked once the player completes the arcade mode. The canon ending of this game consists of Heihachi surviving the fall, entering the King of Iron Fist Tournament 2 and defeating Kazuya, throwing him into an erupting volcano and reclaiming the Mishima Zaibatsu. During the events of the second King of Iron First Tournament, Kazuya and Jun Kazama were mysteriously drawn to one another and became intimate.

==== Tekken 3 ====
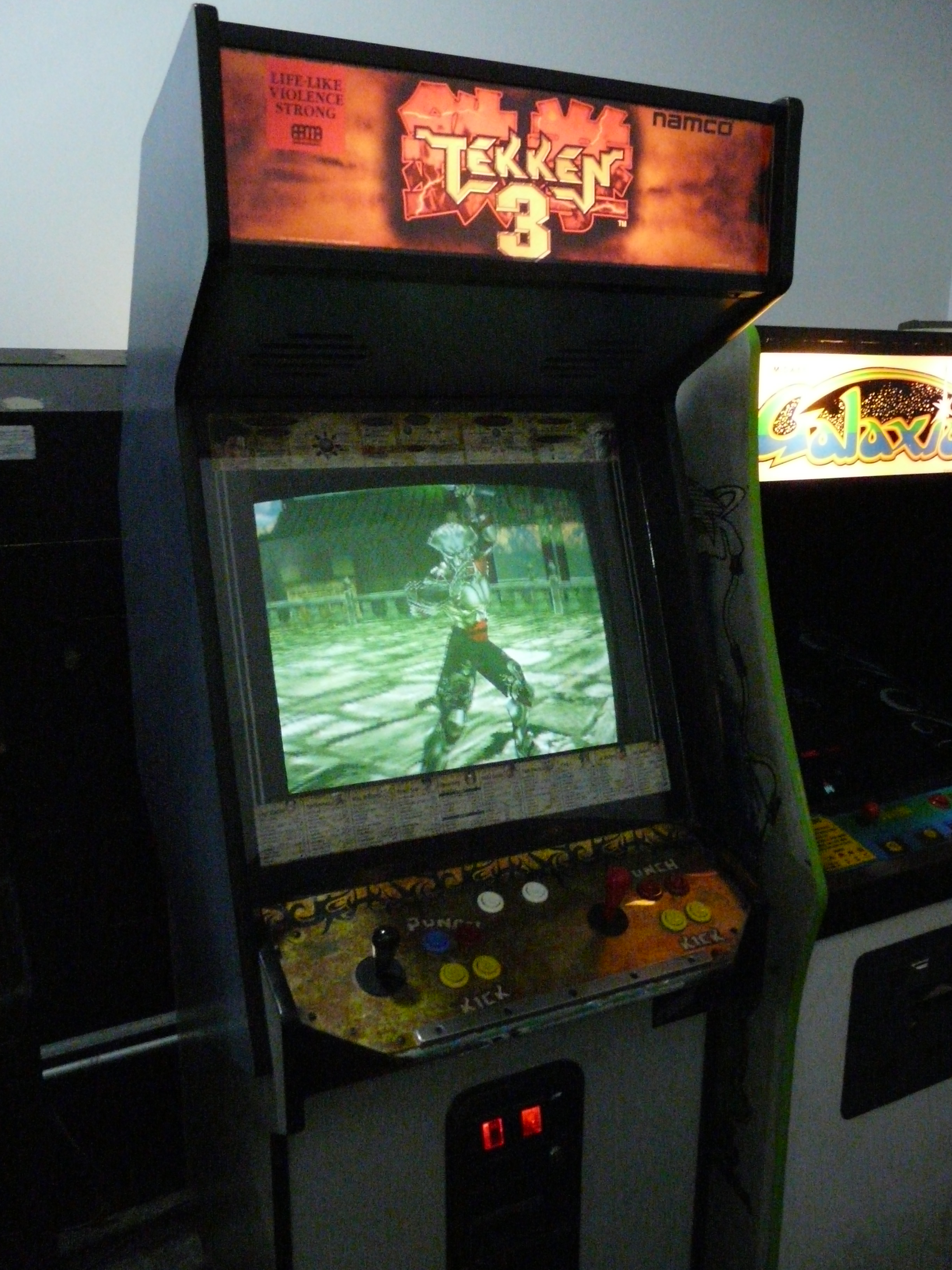
Tekken 3 arcade cabinet

Tekken 3 was released in arcades and for the PlayStation in 1997 and 1998, respectively. Due to the 19-year storyline span between the game and its predecessor, the game largely features a new cast of characters, including the debut of staple main character Jin Kazama, the child of Kazuya and Jun, as well as now-staple characters Ling Xiaoyu and Hwoarang, with a total of twenty-three characters. The home version includes a mode called Tekken Force, as well as the bonus Tekken Ball mode, and also includes remixes to the characters' themes from the arcade version. The canon ending of Tekken 3 consists of Paul Phoenix defeating Ogre and leaving victorious. After its defeat, Ogre transforms into a monstrous creature, "True Ogre". Jin Kazama faces True Ogre and defeats him, avenging his mother. With Ogre out of the way, Jin's grandfather Heihachi shoots him, leaving him for dead. However, Jin survives, being revived by the Devil Gene he inherited from his father.

==== Tekken 4 ====
Tekken 4 is the fifth installment of the series, released in 2001 in arcades and 2002 for the PlayStation 2. The home version includes a new Story mode that unlocks cutscenes when played, in contrast to previous installments in which such cutscenes were unlocked from playing the Arcade Mode. Gameplay revisions include the ability for the player to move about before the round begins, as well as walled-stages. For the first time, the themes used in the arcade mode are the same ones put into the home version. There are 23 characters to choose from. The story reveals that Kazuya survived the fall into the volcano from 20 years prior, and enters the King of Iron Fist Tournament 4 to take back the Mishima Zaibatsu. In the canonical ending, Kazuya and Heihachi are both defeated by Jin. Jin unwillingly transforms into his Devil form, but after glimpsing a vision of his mother, Jun (whom he had not seen in six years), he refrains from executing Heihachi.

==== Tekken 5 ====
Tekken 5 was released in arcades in 2004 and 2005 for the PlayStation 2, with a short period of time of transition from arcade to PlayStation, of two months in North America and four months in Japan. There are 32 characters to choose from, including staple newcomers Devil Jin and Osaka's Asuka Kazama. Many of the characters who were removed in Tekken 3 returned in Tekken 5. The home version includes a mode known as Devil Within, a variant of the Tekken Force mode introduced in Tekken 3. In the canonical ending, Jin Kazama defeats his great-grandfather Jinpachi Mishima (who took over the Mishima Zaibatsu shortly after the ending events of Tekken 4), and inherits the Mishima Zaibatsu.

==== Tekken 6 ====
Tekken 6 was originally released in arcades in 2007, followed by an updated version in 2008 titled Tekken 6: Bloodline Rebellion. The home version was based on Bloodline Rebellion and was released for the PlayStation 3 and Xbox 360, marking the first time in the series that a game was multiplatform. The game features a Scenario Campaign mode, which follows gameplay from previous Tekken Force modes, which was playable online alongside standard versus. In the Scenario Campaign ending, after being defeated by Heihachi's illegitimate son Lars Alexandersson (who suffered amnesia at one point during the Scenario Campaign), Jin Kazama is revealed to have wreaked havoc and waged war on the world to fill it with negative energy and generate a physical manifestation of Azazel, so that he himself can face and kill him, as he believed that killing Azazel may purge Jin himself from the Devil Gene inside his body. After the battle, Jin's body is found by Raven, and the Devil Gene is still intact in his body.

==== Tekken 7 ====
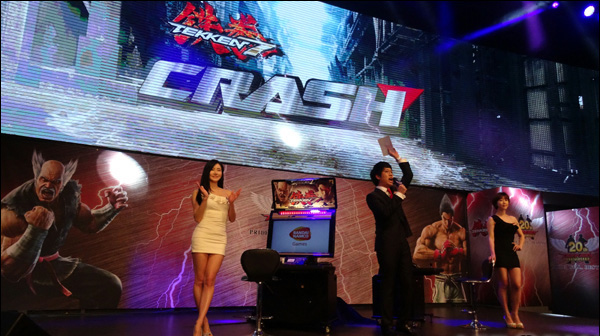
Promotion at Nexon Arena in 2015

In early 2014, Katsuhiro Harada expressed interest in continuing the series on PlayStation 4. Tekken 7 was released in Japanese and Korean arcades in 2015. It is the first game in the series to be powered by the Unreal Engine. The game received an update, subtitled Fated Retribution and released to arcades on July 5, 2016, and featured the series' second, third, fourth and fifth guest characters, the guest characters appearing are Akuma from the Street Fighter franchise by Capcom, Geese Howard from SNK's fighting game franchises, Noctis Lucis Caelum from the Final Fantasy franchise by Square Enix and Negan Smith from The Walking Dead franchise. The PlayStation 4 version was confirmed at Paris Games Week 2015, and features exclusive content as well as virtual reality support. The Xbox One and Microsoft Windows versions were released on June 2, 2017, alongside the PlayStation 4 version, and are based on the Fated Retribution. In the canonical ending, considered the conclusion of the Mishima saga, Heihachi takes control of the Zaibatsu, and attempts to expose Kazuya of the Devil Gene, after a failed attempt on capturing a missing Jin, who was found safely by his uncles Lars and Lee. In their final battle, Kazuya permanently kills Heihachi and throws him into an erupting volcano, whereas Jin, who recovered from his coma thanks to Lars and Lee, declares that he must kill Kazuya to end the cursed Mishima bloodline. It was also revealed that Heihachi killed his wife Kazumi in self-defense because of her possession of the Devil Gene and the fact that she had gained a split personality because of it, shortly after Kazuya was born. Few side playable characters' storylines have their endings from Tekken Tag Tournament 2 ties to this game.

==== Tekken 8 ====
A teaser for a new mainline entry in the series was shown during Tekken 7's tournament at EVO 2022, before being formally announced on September 13, 2022, during Sony's State of Play presentation. It was released on the PlayStation 5, Xbox Series X/S, and PC through Steam on January 26, 2024. As a continuation from the seventh mainline game, it focuses on a conclusion of Kazuya and Jin's enmity. In contrast to the seventh mainline game's utility of Unreal Engine 4, Tekken 8 will utilize Unreal Engine 5, making it the first fighting game to do so. This game was announced on January 6, 2023, to be co-developed with Arika, who also handles the recent patch(es) for Tekken 7.

=== Tag Tournament series ===
==== Tekken Tag Tournament ====
Tekken Tag Tournament was released in 1999 in arcades and as a launch title for the PlayStation 2 in 2000. Tekken Tag Tournament features tag battles and includes almost all of the Tekken characters in the series up until that point in time, for a total of 34 characters. The game ran on the same arcade board with an updated Tekken 3 engine, and thus saw major graphical upgrades when ported to the PlayStation 2. The home version features remixes of the characters' themes from the arcade version, and also features a bonus Tekken Bowl mode. A remastered version of the game, Tekken Tag Tournament HD, is included in the 2011 collection Tekken Hybrid, which also contained a playable demo of Tekken Tag Tournament 2 and the film Tekken: Blood Vengeance.

==== Tekken Tag Tournament 2 ====
Tekken Tag Tournament 2 was released in Japanese arcades in 2011. Its console version was released the next year and is based on the updated arcade version called Tekken Tag Tournament 2 Unlimited that contained new features. The Wii U version, which served as a launch title for the console, includes a revised version of the Tekken Ball mode from Tekken 3 and exclusive Nintendo themed costumes for each character, as well as a new mode that makes use of the mushrooms from the Super Mario Bros. franchise. Like the previous iteration, Tekken Tag Tournament 2 includes nearly every character up to that point and a few exclusive characters. Lili's butler Sebastian, Eddy Gordo's disco-oriented alter ego Tiger Jackson, a new female wrestler character named Jaycee, who is actually Julia Chang in disguise but was made to differentiate the play style of Julia and her mother Michelle Chang, and Slim Bob, a slender version of Bob. A demo version of Tekken Tag Tournament 2 was released as part of Tekken Hybrid including exclusive designs for Devil and Devil Jin from the film Tekken: Blood Vengeance. American rapper Snoop Dogg was featured in the game with his own stage and an original song by the rapper titled "Knocc 'em Down".

=== Other games ===
==== Tekken 5: Dark Resurrection ====
Although Tekken games normally saw updates to the arcade versions, Tekken 5 was the first installment in the series that had a revision significant enough that it was rereleased, with the subtitle Dark Resurrection in 2005. The game was ported to the PlayStation Portable in 2006 and features two new characters: Emilie "Lili" De Rochefort and Sergei Dragunov. Armor King was also reintroduced as a playable character in this revision. The game also introduces a ranking system to the series. The home version featured new modes, such as Ghost Mode, Tekken Dojo Mode, and the two bonus modes, Gold Rush mode, and a revised version of the Tekken Bowl mode introduced in Tekken Tag Tournament. The Devil Within mode from the PlayStation 2 version however, was absent. Namco Bandai saw the fan demand for a console version and a port for the PlayStation 3 via the PlayStation Network was released in 2007, in full 1080p HD. The PlayStation 3 version also saw an update and was retitled Tekken 5: Dark Resurrection ONLINE, marking the first time in the series that online play was featured. The PlayStation 3 version also made Jinpachi Mishima playable (but not online).

==== Spin-off and crossover games ====
Release timeline
| 1994 | Tekken |
| 1995 | Tekken 2 |
1996
| 1997 | Tekken 3 |
1998
| 1999 | Tekken Card Challenge |
| 1999 | Tekken Tag Tournament |
2000
| 2001 | Tekken 4 |
| 2001 | Tekken Advance |
2002–2003
| 2004 | Tekken 5 |
| 2005 | Tekken 5: Dark Resurrection |
| 2005 | Death by Degrees |
2006
| 2007 | Tekken 6 |
| 2008 | Tekken 6: Bloodline Rebellion |
2009
| 2010 | Tekken Resolute |
| 2011 | Tekken Hybrid |
| 2011 | Tekken Tag Tournament 2 |
| 2011 | Tekken Bowl |
| 2012 | Tekken 3D: Prime Edition |
| 2012 | Street Fighter X Tekken |
| 2013 | Tekken Revolution |
| 2013 | Tekken Card Tournament |
| 2013 | Tekken Arena |
2014
| 2015 | Tekken 7 |
| 2015 | Pokkén Tournament |
| 2015 | Galaga: TEKKEN Edition |
| 2016 | Tekken 7: Fated Retribution |
| 2017 | Pokkén Tournament DX |
| 2018 | Tekken Mobile |
| 2019 | Tekken 7: FR: Round 2 |
2020–2023
| 2024 | Tekken 8 |

Promotional image from Gamescom 2010 for Tekken X Street Fighter

Tekken 3 was also ported to the Game Boy Advance as Tekken Advance in 2001. Tekken 6-based Tekken 3D: Prime Edition was released for the Nintendo 3DS in 2012. A free-to-play version of Tekken was released in 2013 for the PSN as Tekken Revolution. Tekken Card Challenge was released on the WonderSwan, a Japan-exclusive handheld, in 1999. A spin-off action adventure game featuring series' character Nina Williams as the protagonist, Death by Degrees, released for the PS2 in 2005. Tekken Resolute, a 2D fighting game which was the first game not to include Heihachi Mishima, was released in 2010 for the J2ME platform, and Tekken Bowl, the bowling mini-game from Tekken Tag Tournament, was released in 2011 for the iOS operating system. Tekken Bowl was the first game not to include Yoshimitsu, Nina Williams, Paul Phoenix, or King. In 2013, a third mobile game titled Tekken Card Tournament was released by Namco Bandai to the App Store for iOS and Google Play Store on Android. That same year, Namco Bandai also released Tekken Arena to the Google Play Store on Android. On April 30, 2015, Namco released Galaga: Tekken 20th Anniversary Edition, a mobile game variant of Galaga featuring characters from the franchise. It was originally announced on April 1, 2015.

Namco and Capcom agreed to create crossover games of the Tekken and Street Fighter franchises. Katsuhiro Harada did reveal some concepts at Gamescom 2010 such as a prototype model of Ryu, with the gi of Tekken's Paul Phoenix. He said the team has yet to finish the model as details and lighting were not completed.

In 2012, Street Fighter X Tekken was released, which was developed by Capcom and includes 2D gameplay mechanics as seen in Street Fighter IV. Namco was also developing Tekken X Street Fighter, which would feature gameplay mechanics similar to Tekken Tag Tournament 2, but it was placed on hold indefinitely in 2016. This was reiterated this during a 2018 year-end party livestream, while also revealing that the game was about 30% complete. In May 2019, Harada states that he still wants to release the game, but his “logical and business” sense has him questioning whether he actually should. In December 2019, Harada posted a poll on his Twitter account, asking the community how much they still were waiting for the game. In June 2021, during a broadcast of his "Harada's Bar Radio" YouTube show, it was believed that Harada confirmed Tekken X Street Fighter had been cancelled.

Pokkén Tournament was announced in August 2014, as a spin-off of the franchise set within the Pokémon franchise. It was initially released in Japan as an arcade game, but was released internationally on Wii U in 2016, and is also ported to Nintendo Switch.

Tekken Mobile, another spinoff, was released on March 1, 2018. Although it had a mixed reception from critics, it was well received by the public and exceeded one million downloads.

== Development ==
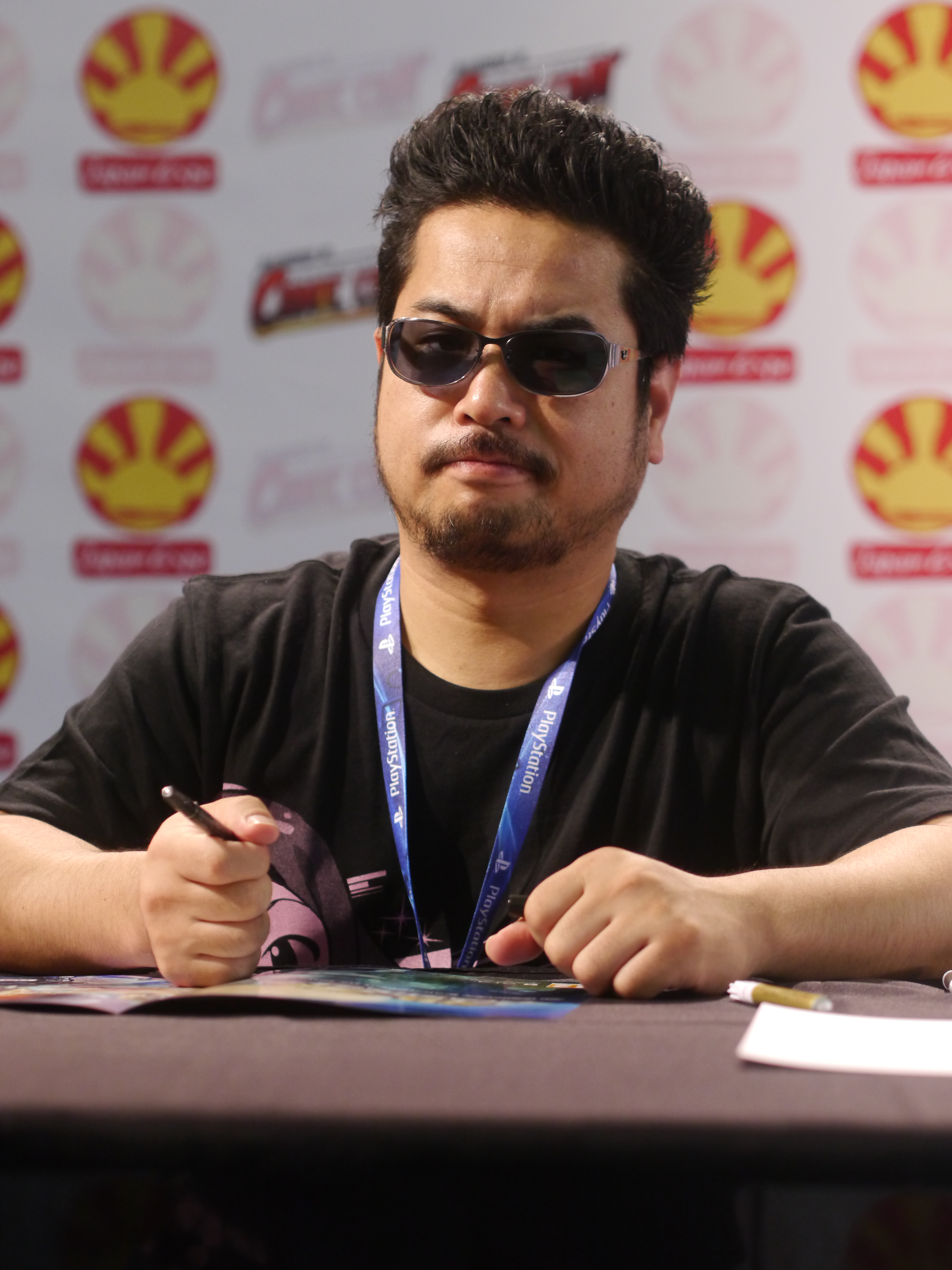
Producer Katsuhiro Harada

Tekken was not originally conceived as a fighting game. The project began as an internal Namco test case for animating 3D character models, and eventually incorporated texture mapping similar to that found in Namco's 1993 racing game Ridge Racer. Directed by Virtua Fighter designer Seiichi Ishii, Tekken was intended to be a fundamentally similar title, with the addition of detailed textures that were not blocky on the characters like Virtua Fighter 2 and twice the frame rate. It was the first 3D fighting game to use the modern 60 fps standard.

== Gameplay ==
An example of a fight in Tekken 5 which uses the series' common 3D design

As with many fighting games, players choose a character from a lineup and engage in hand-to-hand combat with an opponent. Traditional fighting games are usually played with buttons which correspond to the strength of the attack, such as strong punch or weak kick. Tekken, however, dedicates a button to each of the four limbs of the fighter. The gameplay system includes blocks, throws, escapes, and ground fighting.

In the original Tekken, players could only block attacks manually. From then on, starting with Tekken 2, characters automatically block while not moving forward or performing actions, a feature called "neutral guard." Standing or retreating characters will block high and middle attacks with no input from the player, while crouching characters will duck high attacks and block low ones. Normal middle attacks will hit crouching players, but some special mid-attacks can be blocked by both stand and crouching neutral guards. Meanwhile, pressing backwards will give the player an "active guard" that can withstand certain combo attacks that would normally penetrate the neutral guard. Some characters are equipped with parries and reversals that act like traditional "press button to block" systems.

Tekken 3 introduced several gameplay possibilities that were retained in later games, including the ability to sidestep into the foreground or background. Tekken 3 and later games also reduced recovery time after being knocked down and gave characters rolls to recover instantly after hitting the ground, allowing the player to get back into the fight more quickly at the risk of being hit while rolling.

Tekken 4 was another leap, and gave characters even greater mobility by adding true 3D movement inside geometrically complex arenas with uneven ground, obstacles, and walls. The 3D gameplay allows damaging side and back throws as a reward for outmaneuvering the opponent, as well as evasive attacks that develop directly from a sidestep. Tekken 4 received mixed feedback to the point of being considered by some as one of the worst installments in the series which led to major changes starting with Tekken 5. This was done thanks to the new engine provided by Namco. In retrospect, Harada believes Tekken 5, and Tekken 6, managed to attract a new group of fans, something Tekken 4 did not largely do. However, the game has significantly grown in acclaim after some years due to its realism in gameplay and gritty story arcs. Harada has even improved his thoughts on the game and has gone on to call it the best game or peak in the series during an interview for the new Tekken 8. According to Harada, the innovation went "the other way" or reverted to more conservatism beginning Tekken 5. Much of the positive changes and reviews were not focused on in Tekken 4, and instead Harada focused only on the negative reviews against it, which in hindsight was not the proper way to make a fighting game starting with Tekken 5. Thus, he felt the game could have been even better, despite the eventual huge success upon its debut in late 2004. Tekken 5 also saw a combination of walled and infinite arenas, while discarding uneven ground and terrain to allow more juggling.

Tekken 6 retains much of the design from Tekken 5, but it also includes a "Rage" mode, which activates when a character is near the end of his vitality bar and earns a damage multiplier. "Bound" (later known as "Ground Bound") hits were also added, in which a player connected with an airborne opponent will place him in an inescapable grounded state, allowing combo extensions. Tekken 6 also has destructible floors and walls that allow the fighters to blast through to new fighting areas when broken. Tekken Tag Tournament 2 retains these elements while also adding a new kind of stage break ("balcony breaks", which is a combination of floor and wall breaks where characters will go through a breakable wall and fall to a lower level in the same sequence). Tag 2 specific features include Tag Assaults (cooperative combos triggered by hitting a Bound and a tag at the same time) and Tag Crashes (an emergency tag occurring when downed and the partner is currently in Rage).

Tekken 7 introduces some movement changes to the Tekken formula. The back walk animation is now similar to Tekken Revolution, featuring a more fluid movement away from the opponent as opposed to a slower shuffle. Regular back rolling from a grounded state has been removed and instead replaced with new rising animation and performing an "ankle kick" (kicking the standing opponent while laying face up on the ground) is now accompanied by a new back roll to help create separation. Balcony breaks from Tag Tournament 2 are present and function similarly to how they did in solo play. New features include "Power Crushes" (an attack that cannot be interrupted by regular attacks once the animation has begun) and "Rage Arts" (a super move attack that can only be used when your character has hit a Raged state near the end of their vitality meter, sacrificing the Rage mode to perform the attack). Bound has been mostly removed save for specific situations (certain moves can cause a Ground Bound if not combo-ed into and all low parries will cause a Ground Bound effect, similar to Tekken 6: Bloodline Rebellion; floor breaks now result in an effect similar to a Tag Assault in Tag 2 rather than a standard Ground Bound) and instead, characters now have more frequent access to an "Aerial Tailspin" effect (an attack that throws an opponent backward onto their head as opposed to straight downwards, although it is still inescapable once triggered which means the combo can continue). Later Tekken 7 updates eventually add "Rage Drive" (also cost Rage mode, and is an equivalent of EX and lower level super moves) as of Tekken 7: Fated Retribution, with the console ports' post-Season 1 adds two new damage properties which were originally existed in previous characters and still can only work against an opponent while they are on the ground. Tekken 7 Season 2 adds "Wall Bound" mechanic, which bounces opponents from the wall to nearby them to an airborne state with a knockdown attack, originally used by both NANCY-MI847J in Tekken 6 and a guest character Geese Howard prior to Season 2. However, currently, only a guest character Negan Smith can utilize Wall Bounce against an airborne opponent via one of his Rage Drives. The last update patch of Tekken 7 Season 4 adds "Wall Stun", which causes opponents to be bounced from the wall and entered a downed hit stun, whether they were being hit by or blocked their attacking opponents' attack.

Tekken 8 introduced a new heat mode making the game oriented toward offensive play and creates more opportunities to turn the tide of a fight.

== Characters ==
The conflict between the Mishima family serves as the main focus of the series' plot. As seen from left to right: Jinpachi Mishima, Heihachi Mishima, Kazuya Mishima and Jin Kazama.

Players can choose from a diverse cast that hails from a variety of ethnic backgrounds and fighting styles. A few characters have supernatural origin, such as Devil, Alisa Bosconovitch, Angel, Mokujin, Ogre and Azazel, while animal characters like Kuma, Panda, the Roger family, and Alex provide comic relief. In the story mode of the game, each character generally has their own personal reasons for entering the tournament and competing for the prize.

The protagonist of the series has varied between installments; the character ending of each canon game determines the protagonist of each. Kazuya Mishima was the protagonist in the original game and Tekken 7, his father Heihachi Mishima was the protagonist of Tekken 2, and Jin Kazama has been one of the central protagonists since his debut in Tekken 3 with Kazuya and Heihachi sharing the mantle in Tekken 7. The conflict between the Mishima family within multiple generations serves as the main conflict to the series' plot or at least the Mishima saga according to Katsuhiro Harada, who describes it as a simple struggle of the three men aiming to destroy one another and the devil gene. Although Lars Alexandersson among other characters are not fully related to them, they serve as major characters within Tekken 6 where Jin serves as the main antagonist instead of his relatives.

Characters with background connections in the story typically have styles or moves in common. For example, Heihachi and Kazuya Mishima, by virtues of familial connection and studying under the same Advanced Mishima Style Fighting Karate discipline, have very similar moves and a signature "crouch dash" stance for pretty much their entire appearances in the series. Jin Kazama, when he debuted, also had the same Mishima fighting style, though he mixed this with Kazama Style Traditional Martial Arts as practiced by his mother, Jun Kazama. For storyline reasons, starting on Tekken 4, he forwent this in favor of Traditional Karate, a completely different discipline that technically made him an entirely different character, while his old movelist was given to his demonic form, Devil Jin. Meanwhile, there are some characters who were formerly clones of each other before they diverged and gained unique moves, such as Lee Chaolan (a clone of Marshall Law), Anna Williams (a clone of her sister, Nina), and Armor King (a clone of King). Still further, there are also characters who are replacements or "successors" of older characters; this happened principally in Tekken 3 due to the significant time skip, though some older characters later returned alongside their successors anyway. Examples include Julia Chang (replacing her adoptive mother, Michelle), Hwoarang (replacing his mentor, Baek Doo San, who later returned) and as mentioned above, Jin Kazama (replacing both of his parents, Kazuya and Jun, the former of whom later returned, while the latter was replaced by Asuka Kazama). Another example of two characters sharing a moveset can be seen with Eddy Gordo, a Brazilian representing the dance fighting martial art known as Capoeira. He shares these dance fighting moves with his mentee, Christie Monteiro.

Some Tekken characters have been featured as guest characters in other video games, such as Anna Kournikova's Smash Court Tennis, Digimon World Re:Digitize, Naruto Shippuden: Ultimate Ninja Storm 2, Pac-Man Fever, PlayStation All-Stars Battle Royale, Ridge Racer 6, Smash Court Tennis Pro Tournament 2, Soulcalibur II, Super Smash Bros. Ultimate, Brawlhalla, and Urban Reign, as well as in some crossover role-playing video games, including Cross Edge, Namco × Capcom, Project X Zone, Project X Zone 2, Queen's Gate: Spiral Chaos, and The King of Fighters All Star.

== Adaptations ==
=== Anime series ===
Tekken: Bloodline, a streaming television anime series, was announced by Netflix in March 2022. It loosely adapts the events of Tekken 3 and was released on August 18, 2022.

=== Animated films ===
Tekken: The Motion Picture, a two-part OVA anime series, was released in Japan in 1998. It was developed by Studio Deen and directed by Kunihisa Sugishima. Its story follows Kazuya Mishima's revenge against his father Heihachi in the King of Iron Fist Tournament.

Tekken: Blood Vengeance, a full-length animated film in Digital 3D directed by Youichi Mouri, premiered in the United States in 2011 and was released in Japan two months later that same year. Digital Frontier developed and Bandai Entertainment distributed the film. Blood Vengeance is an alternate retelling between the events of Tekken 5 and Tekken 6. It was released in Japan in December 2011 as a part of the Tekken Hybrid collection.

=== Live-action films ===
Tekken is a live-action film directed by Dwight Little and starring Jon Foo, Ian Anthony Dale and Kelly Overton. It was released at the AFI Film Festival on November 5, 2009, and in Japan on March 20, 2010, through Warner Bros. The film focuses on Jin Kazama who enters into the King of Iron Fist Tournament after his mother's death. Katsuhiro Harada, director of the Tekken video game series, has panned the film.

A prequel to the 2009 film titled Tekken 2: Kazuya's Revenge was released direct-to-DVD on August 12, 2014. It is directed by Wych Kaosayananda and stars Kane Kosugi and Kelly Wenham, with Cary-Hiroyuki Tagawa and Gary Daniels returning from the first film. Variety reports that Paul Stevens will produce a Tekken remake with China's company Financing City Network.

Tekken Tag Tournament 2, a live-action short film by Wild Stunt Europe, was released on Namco Bandai Games Europe's YouTube channel on October 19, 2012.

=== Other media ===
There have been five printed adaptations of the Tekken games. Knightstone Comics published both Tekken Saga and Tekken 2, released in October 1997 and September 1998 respectively. Both comics were written by John Kim and illustrated by Walter McDaniel. Tekken Forever, a comic book by Dave Chi, illustrated by Paco Diaz, and published by Image Comics in December 2001, features a story that focused on the Kazama family and also the Unknown character from Tekken Tag Tournament. Tekken: Tatakai no Kanatani (鉄拳：闘いの彼方に; lit. "Tekken: The Other Side of Battle") is a manga written by Keiichi Suzuki and published by Shogakukan, which was collected in two tankōbon volumes with the first one on December 5, 2000, and the second one on April 5, 2001. Tekken Comic is a manga illustrated by Rui Takato and published by Ultra Egg Jump in 2009. Although the story leads up to the King of Iron Fist Tournament 6, it is non-canonical to the main video game series. In October 2016, Titan Comics announced a new Tekken comic book, a four-issue mini-series by Cavan Scott, illustrated by Andie Tong, and published in mid-2017. The series takes place between Tekken 6 and 7, and deals with Jin struggling against the Devil within him.

Characters and settings from the series also appear in the collectible card game Universal Fighting System by Fantasy Flight Games and in Epic Battles by Score Entertainment.

== Reception ==
Sales and aggregate review scores As of August 23, 2024.
| Game | Units sold (in millions) | GameRankings | Metacritic | OpenCritic |
|---|---|---|---|---|
| Tekken | 2.8 | (PS1) 75% | – | – |
| Tekken 2 | 5.7 | (PS1) 93% | (PS1) 89 | – |
| Tekken 3 | 8.43 | (PS1) 95% | (PS1) 96 | – |
| Tekken Tag Tournament | 4.35 | (PS2) 86% | (PS2) 85 | – |
| Tekken 4 | 4.35 | (PS2) 81% | (PS2) 79 | – |
| Tekken 5 | 9.43 | (PS2) 89% | (PS2) 88 | – |
| Tekken 5: Dark Resurrection | – | (PSP) 89% (PS3) 82% | (PSP) 88 (PS3) 82 | – |
| Tekken 6 | 5.6 | (PSP) 83% (X360) 81% (PS3) 80% | (PSP) 82 (360) 80 (PS3) 79 | – |
| Tekken Tag Tournament 2 | 1.8 | (PS3) 82% (360) 83% (Wii U) 83% | (PS3) 82 (360) 83 (Wii U) 83 | – |
| Tekken 7 | 12 | (PC) 83% (PS4) 81% (XONE) 82% | (PC) 82 (PS4) 82 (XONE) 81 | 83% recommend |
| Tekken 8 | 3 | – | (PC) 92 (PS5) 90 (XSXS) 89 | 99% recommend |

Critical reception to the games has been positive. The series arguably peaked in acclaim with the release of Tekken 3, based on its average of 96% at GameRankings, as well as in Metacritic, and to this day is considered one of the greatest fighting games of all time. Not to be outdone are other frequent candidate games that are all in the main series, namely Tekken 2, Tekken Tag Tournament, Tekken 4, Tekken 5, and Tekken 8.

In 1999, Next Generation listed the Tekken series as number 12 on their "Top 50 Games of All Time", commenting that, "In the transition from 16-bit to 32-bit, Tekken stole the crown from Street Fighter as the king of modern brawlers with addictive fighting in its rawest form."

Developers of non-Tekken games have commented on the series in various ways. Ed Boon, the co-creator of Mortal Kombat, revealed in one of his interviews with GamePro that his favorite fighting game out of his competitors is Tekken. Both Sega and Namco have shown interest in a possible crossover between Virtua Fighter and Tekken, which came in the form of Project X Zone and its sequel for the 3DS. Tekken is known to have been heavily inspired by Virtua Fighter and the series has often been labelled as a "rival" to Virtua Fighter as they became two of the most famous 3D fighting game series along with Soulcalibur and Dead or Alive. On the other hand, Tomonobu Itagaki, designer of the Dead or Alive series, expressed dislike for the Tekken franchise due to Namco running radio commercial ads insulting his Dead or Alive series, prompting Itagaki to place it as one of his most disliked games. However, Itagaki has gone on to say he adopted a Western business style of directly targeting his competition with criticism, but actually considered the franchise and producer Katsuhiro Harada as his "comrade-in-arms," and both have reconciled since Itagaki's resignation.

In 2004's Shaun of the Dead, characters Pete, Shaun, and Ed "stayed up all night, drinking apple schnapps and playing Tekken 2." Tekken 3 is considered one of the greatest games of all time.

In 2012, Complex ranked Tekken at number 11 on the list of the best video game franchises, commenting: "Just when we thought that the Street Fighter franchise was going to be the epitome of fighting games, Tekken came to make it share its portion of the knuckle-busting pie. Tekken has cult-like fans who live and breathe the moves and storylines."

=== Sales ===
As of May 2017, the Tekken franchise had sold 44 million copies. As of September 2020, Tekken series sales top 50 million. As of March 2023, the Tekken franchise had sold 55 million copies worldwide. As of April 2024, the Tekken franchise had sold over 58 million copies worldwide. As of March 2025, the Tekken franchise had sold 61 million copies worldwide.

Tekken 7 is the highest-selling game in the franchise, selling over 12 million copies as of August 2024.

== Legacy ==
Yes, we have developed it [for] PlayStation 1, 2, and now 3, so it is true that we have really grown with the PlayStation brand - we have a lot of fond memories, and we worked very closely with Mr. Kutaragi as well, so we had a really good relationship. We love the platform.

— Katsuhiro Harada, addressing Tekken's multiplatform debut

Since the series has a long history of being exclusive to PlayStation along with the arcade cabinets running on PlayStation hardware, Tekken has been associated closely with the PlayStation brand. Katsuhiro Harada has stated that PlayStation remains the main platform of development for Tekken.

The first game in the series was the first PlayStation game to sell over a million units, which earned it a Guinness World Records Gamer's Edition award in 2008, among other awards including "First Fighting Game To Feature Simulated 3D", and a record for the entire series, "The Best Selling Fighting Series for PlayStation Consoles." Tekken Tag Tournament was one of the most popular launch titles for the PlayStation 2.

Another game developed by Namco, Soulcalibur II, included exclusive characters for different console versions and featured Heihachi Mishima, a character that has been in all Tekken games and the protagonist of Tekken 2, exclusive to the PlayStation 2 version. He was also playable in PlayStation All-Stars Battle Royale and is Harada's favorite character in the series.

Tekken 7's PlayStation 4 announcement trailer featured a retrospective celebration of "20 Years of Tekken", and the PlayStation 4 version of the game features exclusive content from previous titles in the series, including character costumes and musical tracks. The PlayStation 4 version was the best selling version of the game, and provided a 6% boost in hardware sales in Japan. While PlayStation Classic was not well received by the public, Tekken 3 was included in the preloaded collection. Tekken 3 is also available in all regions.

Astro's Playroom, a 2020 video game released as a launch title for PlayStation 5, included a homage to the Tekken series. The inclusion was supervised by Harada as well. The successor, 2024's Astro Bot, also included a reference to Tekken. Closed network testing of Tekken 8 was available first exclusively to PlayStation 5, as well as a demo. While Windows became the most popular platform for Tekken 8, sales on the PlayStation 5 version were significantly higher than the Xbox SeriesX/S's.

In May 2012, Namco Bandai opened Tekken Museum in Osaka, Japan. The museum showcases goods, action figures, artworks, life-size statues of Tekken characters, and various merchandise. The items on display are rotated regularly so that the museum is worth multiple visits.
