= Heihachi Mishima =

Tekken character

- Tekken character
- Heihachi Mishima in Tekken 7 (2015)
- First appearance: Tekken (1994)
- Created by: Hajime Nakatani
- Designed by: Aya Takemura; Takuji Kawano (Tekken 4–Tekken 5, Soulcalibur II)
- Voiced by: List: Banjō Ginga (Tekken, Japanese dub of the live-action Tekken films); Wataru Takagi (Tekken 2); Daisuke Gōri (Tekken 3 – Tekken 6; Tekken: The Motion Picture and Soulcalibur II (Japanese); Death by Degrees, Namco × Capcom, Ridge Racer 6); John Paul Shephard (Tekken: The Motion Picture, English); Kevin Michael Richardson (Soulcalibur II, English); Jamieson Price (Tekken: Blood Vengeance and Street Fighter X Tekken, English); Unshō Ishizuka (Tekken Tag Tournament 2 – Tekken 7 (archived voice in KOF All Star and Super Smash Bros. Ultimate); Tekken: Blood Vengeance and Street Fighter X Tekken (Japanese)); Tōru Ōkawa (Puchimas! Petit Idolmaster); Taiten Kusunoki (Tekken: Bloodline (Japanese); Tekken 8); S. Hiroshi Watanabe (Tekken: Bloodline, English)
- Portrayed by: Cary-Hiroyuki Tagawa
- Motion capture: Syuichi Masuda, Kouji Kawamoto (Blood Vengeance)

In-universe information
- Fighting style: Mishima-ryu Karate (based on Goju-ryu karate)
- Children: Kazuya Mishima, Lars Alexandersson,Reina, Lee (adopted)
- Origin: Japan
- Nationality: Stateless (Citizenship revoked by Japan)

Heihachi Mishima (Japanese: 三島 平八, Hepburn: Mishima Heihachi) is a character and one of the main antagonists of Bandai Namco's Tekken series. Introduced as a boss character in the first Tekken game from 1994, Heihachi is depicted as the abusive father of his many children including Kazuya Mishima, as well as the patriarch of the Mishima Zaibatsu, which was founded by his own father, Jinpachi Mishima. Heihachi has served as the protagonist of Tekken 2 and Tekken 7, as well as a boss character in several other installments of the series. As one of the main characters, he is one of the four characters to be playable in all eight main installments.

He is opposed by many of his relatives, especially his son and grandson, Kazuya Mishima and Jin Kazama, respectively. This happens across the series and one of the creators of Tekken Katsuhiro Harada has called it a "family feud". Heihachi's backstory and motives are revealed in Tekken 7, in which he is apparently killed by Kazuya and thus does not initially appear in Tekken 8. Heihachi returns in 8 as post-launch DLC, resurfacing as part of the series' thirtieth anniversary. Heihachi has two known illegitimate children in the series; the first is Lars Alexandersson; and the second is Reina, who possesses some of his moves and personality traits. He is also the adoptive father of Violet Industries CEO Lee Chaolan.

Outside of Tekken spin-off titles, Heihachi also appears as a playable character in other games such as Namco x Capcom, Soulcalibur II, The King of Fighters All Star, PlayStation All-Stars Battle Royale, Street Fighter X Tekken, Project X Zone and its sequel Project X Zone 2. He is also featured in the printed, animated and live-action adaptations of the Tekken series. Critical reception to the character has been well-received, with journalists praising his moves and characterization. However, some have criticized his design and expressed a lack of interest in his increased role in Tekken 7.

== Conception and creation ==
Tekken series director Katsuhiro Harada has stated that Heihachi is his favorite character in the series overall and the character he most frequently selects when playing the game. He further described Heihachi as a "very human character", stating that while focus has been placed on his appearance, he found the character's philosophy more interesting, and that in the series he was a "perfect portrayal of the evil that lurks in men's hearts", an evil "far more hideous than any made-up monster". In response to claims that the story of Tekken was complicated, Harada denied as he saw it as a "simple" struggle between members from the Mishima family. Despite promotion from Tekken 5 claiming that Heihachi has died in the intro, Namco Bandai denied this statement in interviews. Heihachi's story and traits are based on Harada's history with his father. Harada was born in 1970, after World War II. However, Harada claims that in that period, parents were harsh with their children in Japan. As a result, Heihachi was portrayed as an antagonistic father to his son; something that the Japanese players could relate to. Heihachi's power in the form of the zaibatsu was based on the Imperialistic Japan. Furthermore, Heihachi is Tekken's personification of wartime Japan.

After Tekken 6, Heihachi's voice actor Daisuke Gōri died. In order to include the Heihachi once again in the spin-off Tekken Tag Tournament 2, Namco hired a new voice actor who would fit well for Heihachi. As for in this game, Heihachi took a potion to make himself look younger. The voice selected was Unshō Ishizuka. Tekken 7's story mode was supposed to conclude the long struggle between Kazuya and Heihachi. However, Namco made the story so that newcomers to the franchise would understand it more easily. In further teasers of the game, Harada stated that in Tekken 7 Kazuya or Heihachi would die in their final fight. In 2016, Harada commented he had his own family. As a result, he compared it with the violent characters from Tekken who are constantly fighting each other: Heihachi, Jin, and Kazuya. He viewed this type of family as "too hard" in comparison. When asked about the final fight between both Kazuya and Heihachi, Harada called it "a major milestone in the storyline", as he was surprised by how extended the rivalry between these two characters has become due to the franchise's current popularity, and thus felt it was necessary to end this in a mortal fight.

In Tekken 5, his movesets were viewed as one of the strongest from the cast but GameSpy commented that he lacked a weakness, as well as quicker attacks. In preparations for Tekken 7, Harada commented that he would often try Devil Jin if he was an "intermediate player", comparing his skills with Heihachi's. For Capcom's crossover game Street Fighter X Tekken, the official guide noted how Heihachi's multiple combos could inflict a large amount of damage on the opponents.

For the animated film Tekken: Blood Vengeance, writer Dai Satō commented that he had to wait to get Namco's approval to introduce Heihachi's final transformation using the power of the Mokujin in order to fight Jin in his Devil form. Heihachi's transformation surprised Harada and other members due to how over-the-top it was. The fight scene between the three generations of the Mishima family proved to be difficult to make as a result of the choreography aimed as well as the movement of motion actors. In order to use Heihachi in the movie, the original character Shin Kamiya was created. Shin's relationship with the Devil Gene experiments attract villain in the story. In retrospect, Satō was shocked when learning Lars was Heihachi's son, comparing it to Masami Kurumada's manga Saint Seiya which uses a similar plot twist involving a man like Heihachi, Mitsumasa Kido, having several offsprings secretly. Tekken 8 director Kohei Ikeda had teased Heihachi in the game through a logo that resembles his hairstyle. He further aims to give Tekken 8 Heihachi a striking gameplay.

Comic book artist Cavan Scott described Heihachi and Kazuya as "demons" due to their dark character traits, making their rivalry with Jin look unfitting in the narrative because of their differences. Scott wanted fans to look forward to his Tekken comic adaptation due to his handling of the three main characters, as it's set during the time Jin becomes similar to Heihachi and Kazuya, making their war more engaging. While still treating Jin as the main character for not reaching Heihachi's traits in terms of corruption, he believed the two would, nevertheless, be interesting enemies.

== Appearances ==
=== In video games ===
==== Main Tekken series ====
In the first Tekken game, Heihachi hosts the first King of Iron Fist Tournament, offering a substantial prize money and even ownership of the Mishima Zaibatsu itself to those who have the courage and determination to defeat him. Kazuya wins the tournament and throws Heihachi off a similar cliff to that which Heihachi had thrown him off. Kazuya then takes control of the Mishima Zaibatsu. During the second game, Heihachi takes Kazuya's unconscious body to a volcano, and throws him into it before escaping on a helicopter just as the volcano erupts behind him, and regained the control of Mishima Zaibatsu, killing Kazuya. Fifteen years later, Heihachi learns of a creature, Ogre, which has immortal blood, Heihachi seeks his blood in order to create an "ultimate life form". Around this time, he meets his grandson Jin Kazama, whom he trains so he can take revenge against Ogre for murdering his beloved mother Jun. Four years later, Heihachi announces the King of Iron Fist Tournament 3 to lure Ogre out. After his grandson defeats the Ogre, Heihachi's forces kill Jin. However, Jin, revived by the Devil within him, reawakens and smashes Heihachi through the wall of the temple as he survives and flies away.

During the events of King of Iron Fist Tournament 4, Heihachi has managed to captured samples of Ogre's blood and tissue to splice with Heihachi's genome, in order to make him immortal and attempts to combine his and Ogre's DNA, but discovers that he will need the Devil Gene possessed by his son and grandson as a catalyst. Heihachi learns Kazuya has been resurrected and lures both Kazuya and Jin, to the fourth King of Iron Fist Tournament. However, both are defeated by Jin after. In Tekken 5, Heihachi is seemingly killed in the by Jacks. However, he managed to survive and when he came to, the King of Iron Fist Tournament 5 which was organized by his father Jinpachi was already over. Heihachi went home, where he was ambushed by the Tekken Force. Shortly after the attack, the CEO of Mishima Zaibatsu Jin announced the King of Iron Fist Tournament 6. Heihachi appears in the story mode in the console version of Tekken 6, whose main protagonist is Lars Alexandersson, Heihachi's illegitimate son which Heihachi had from an unknown Swedish woman. Heihachi tries to make an alliance with Lars but Lars declines to do it. Nevertheless, Heihachi still uses Lars from behind to dispose Jin, so the former will finally retake the Zaibatsu once again.

Heihachi returns as the main character and arcade mode sub-boss in Tekken 7. The story follows most of his backstory. Heihachi is better known as the only son of Jinpachi Mishima, a famous martial artist who founded the Mishima Zaibatsu company. Heihachi later meets Kazumi Hachijo, who is much younger than him and sent by her family. Eventually, Heihachi and Kazumi become closer and get married, and Kazumi gives birth to their son, Kazuya. One evening, Kazumi attempts to kill Heihachi. Her clan foresaw his attempt at world domination in the future and she was sent to assassinate him before that future comes to pass. However, a heart broken Heihachi kills her in self-defense. Furthermore, following Kazumi's revelation as a devil, it ultimately explains the reason why Heihachi knocked Kazuya out and threw off the cliff when he was five years old, is because he, then later Heihachi's grandson, Jin inherited Kazumi's demonic blood at birth.

Back in the present, after Jin disappeared in the previous tournament, Heihachi finally has an opportunity to single-handedly retake the Mishima Zaibatsu. After defeating Tekken force soldiers and Nina Williams, he announces the seventh King of Iron Fist tournament to lure Kazuya out with the thoughts of killing him, while continue the world war which Jin started. With Heihachi's return, his pet Kuma becomes a Tekken Force officer. Heihachi was also responsible for two new previous atrocities in the past, such as a gang war at Leroy Smith's hometown at Manhattan, New York, and an assassination on Lidia Sobieska's father, which she and her grandfather survived. At the same time, he is confronted by a person named Akuma, whose life was once saved by Heihachi's deceased wife, Kazumi, and who promised to kill both Heihachi and Kazuya for her in return. Heihachi clashes with Akuma and loses, but survives. In order to save the Zaibatsu's image, Heihachi captures footage of Kazuya's battle with Akuma in his Devil form; Their fight is interrupted as Heihachi blasts the two using Dr. Abel's satellite, but both survive. The satellite is destroyed by Kazuya in his devil form, plummeting all the way down to the city, and turned the people against the Zaibatsu. Heihachi then confronts Kazuya at the site of a volcano and the two of them begin fighting. After a long battle, Heihachi is finally defeated and killed; his corpse is subsequently thrown into a river of molten lava, and only a few people know of his supposed permanent death.

By the time of the events of Tekken 8, a girl named Reina appears and joins the tournament, having some of Heihachi's moves, and is later revealed to be not only his daughter, but also secretly another Devil Gene user like Kazumi, Kazuya and Jin. Suddenly, as shown in the Season 1 Pass side story, Heihachi returns as the Season Pass' DLC fighter, as part of the series' 30th anniversary, where it is explained why he returned after being killed in Tekken 7. Additionally, a mysterious group called the Tekken Monks, which comes to reveal themselves after Tekken 7 and are initially suspected to have a connection to G Corporation, but later proves to be false. It is revealed after Kazuya killed Heihachi, one of the Tekken Monk manage to catch Heihachi's corpse before his body hits the lava pool, then brought it to the monks' base at Genmaji Temple, where Heihachi is revived and had his evil in him sealed, in hopes to rehabilitate him. Furthermore, Tekken Monks are in fact separate branch of Mishima clan who follows the oath of purification that has been passed through generations since battling Azazel and his Devil Gene remnants, following the downfall within main Mishima family that led to the main conflict within the series. Reina had been trying find Heihachi's whereabouts, until the monks themselves approaches Lidia for a request to help rehabilitating Heihachi. However, the seal of Heihachi's evil starts to break free in the process. To make matters worse, during the final test of his rehabilitation, where he headbutted a falling meteor as a result of Jin and Kazuya's clash in space, he unknowingly broke the seal which kept his evil in him, and the rehabilitation fails. As Heihachi's evil completely returns to him, he goes on a rampage on the Tekken Monks, and defeated Lidia, Eddy and Yoshimitsu, all single-handedly before escaping with a secret Mishima technique he learnt from the monks. Apparently, it is also further revealed in the Hachijo Clan journal that Heihachi spared a baby to become a sole survivor of his revenge on the Hachijo clan since the Kazumi incident. The surviving baby Hachijo is suspected to be Reina, as Heihachi was somehow already aware of her Devil Gene and has high hopes for her as he does with Kuma's family, leaving her actual relationship with him ambiguous.

==== Other video games ====
In the non-canon spin-off Tekken Tag Tournament, Heihachi appears as a playable character. By winning the game as him, Heihachi is seen meditating while remembering his fights against Kazuya and Jin. In Tekken Tag Tournament 2, Tekken 3D: Prime Edition, Tekken Revolution, PlayStation All-Stars Battle Royale, Project X Zone, and Project X Zone 2, Heihachi appears to have regressed back to his original appearance. Heihachi is seen with a full head of hair for the first time. According to his character profile on the Tekken Tag Tournament 2 website, this is because he drank a rejuvenation serum. In the ending of such game, Heihachi tries to drink a serum to become a Devil like Jin, Kazuya and Kazumi, but instead turns into a bear. Additionally, In the "Fight Lab" section of the game, Lee kidnaps the Mishima three fighters for Combot's final test of the machine Heihachi, Kazuya and Jin.

Heihachi makes a brief appearance in the Tekken spin-off game Death by Degrees as an optional boss. He also makes an appearance as a playable guest character in the PlayStation 2 and HD Online versions of the fighting game Soulcalibur II, and as an unlockable narrator in Ridge Racer 6, one of the launch titles for Xbox 360. A Mii costume of Heihachi was added to Super Smash Bros. for Nintendo 3DS and Wii U and also in Super Smash Bros. Ultimate through DLC., Heihachi Mishima was also briefly considered as a playable character in the same game: Super Smash Bros. for Nintendo 3DS and Wii U, but was decided against because the game's developer, Masahiro Sakurai, considered implementing Heihachi's movement in Super Smash Bros. to be difficult, this was mentioned in Sakurai's Thoughts About Making Video Games 2. In Super Smash Bros. Ultimate, the costume returns and he is also featured as a sprite in Pac-Man's Namco Roulette taunt. He later appears as a background character in the Mishima Dojo stage and as a Spirit. Heihachi made cameo in the Tekken Bowl App due to the pins being based on his face. Heihachi is one of the bonus characters available to play as or against in Anna Kournikova's Smash Court Tennis for the PlayStation (alongside fellow Namco characters) and is an unlockable character in Smash Court Tennis Pro Tournament 2. He also makes guest appearances in the role-playing game Tales of the Abyss (as one of Anise's custom dolls) and in Pac-Man Fever (alongside several other Namco characters). In the crossover tactical RPG Namco × Capcom Heihachi appears as one of playable characters representing the Namco universe. He also appears in the crossover fighting game Street Fighter X Tekken with Kuma as his official tag partner. He also appears in SNK's mobile phone game The King of Fighters All Star. Heihachi also makes a cameo appearance with Kazuya in the PlayStation 5 game, Astro's Playroom. Heihachi appears as a playable character in Fist of the North Star Legends ReVIVE.

=== In other media ===
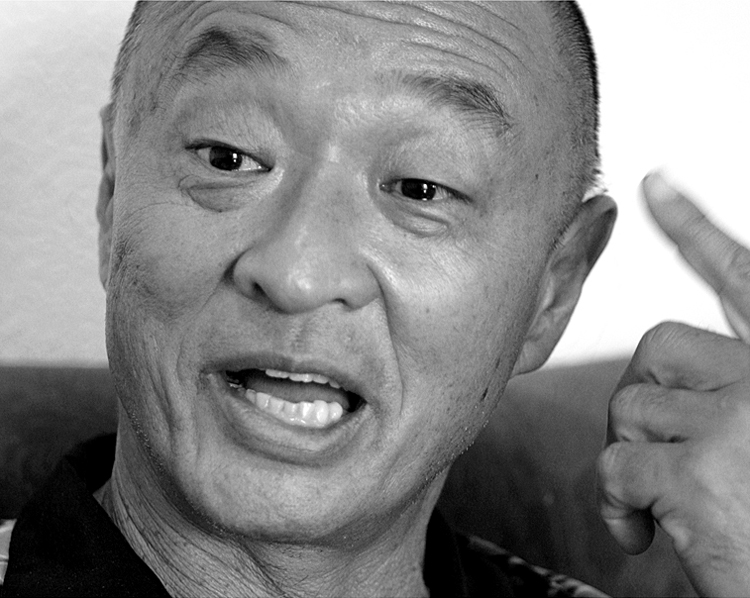
Cary-Hiroyuki Tagawa portrays Heihachi in the live-action films.

Heihachi appears as the main antagonist in the anime Tekken: The Motion Picture, voiced by Daisuke Gōri in the Japanese version and by John Paul Shepard in the English dub. In the beginning, Heihachi throws Kazuya off a cliff as a child, and sixteen years later, hosts the King of Iron Fist Tournament in order to lure Kazuya out in the hope that he will accept his destiny as his heir. In the climax, Heihachi battles Kazuya and initially takes the upper hand, but is ultimately defeated. Kazuya, however, spares his father's life, and Heihachi escapes the battleground in a jet.

He is also present in the 2009 film Tekken where Heihachi is portrayed by stuntman Cary-Hiroyuki Tagawa. Tagawa reprised his role in the prequel Tekken 2: Kazuya's Revenge. He also appears as the main antagonist in the 2011 CGI animated film Tekken: Blood Vengeance, which is an alternate retelling of the events between Tekken 5 and Tekken 6. In it, he was supposedly killed by Kazuya four years ago, though in reality he is hiding and had conducted the M-cell experiment (taken from the Devil Gene) on a high school class to test immortality. However, all of the subjects died with the exception of Shin Kamiya, who managed to gain immortality as Heihachi desired. Heihachi is absent for most of the film until the climax, where he reveals that the experiment was just a ruse; he instead tries to take the Devil Gene from Kazuya and Jin, which gives its users increased power. After killing Shin, he fights Kazuya and Jin, awakening the Mokujin spirit for help, though he is ultimately defeated by Jin. He is also present in the novel Tekken: The Dark History of Mishima.

Tooru Fujisawa featured Heihachi as a cameo in his manga Great Teacher Onizuka, modeled after his younger appearance in Tekken. In it, he engages in an arm wrestling competition with protagonist Onizuka, shouting out controller inputs while the crowd shouts for him to "Do a combo!" Though Heihachi strains him for a moment, Onizuka defeats him, calling him "triangle head" as an insult. Heihachi cameos again in a later issue briefly, overseeing students as they clean graffiti from the school's walls. Heihachi also makes a cameo appearance in the Puchimas! Petit Petit Idolmaster ONA series.

== Promotion and reception ==
In 2006, Namco released a Heihachi figurine as part of a Tekken 5 set based upon his promotional artwork for the game. While not posable, the PVC figure came with equipable clothing items modeled after those in the game. A "statue" of Heihachi modeled after his Tekken 5 attire also appears in the Namco-themed lounge available for Japanese PlayStation Home users. A Heihachi Mishima-Inspired "Sukajan Jacket" was also released.

Heihachi has been a very popular character in the Tekken series and well received from the critics. Sites have noted him as one of the best Tekken fighters citing his recognizable strength despite his old age. He was also recognized as one of the best bosses in gaming as well as Tekken characters by multiple websites.

Critics enjoyed his work in the Tekken narrative. Complex noted that what made the character stand out mostly within fighting games in general was to his history in Tekken. The same site enjoyed his narrative in Tekken 2, calling his ending as "the craziest moments in the Tekken series" as he throws Kazuya into a volcano. His portrayal as a villain also earned subject of praise due to his treatment to his relatives. GameSpot listed Heihachi as one of the top ten villains in video games at number three, describing him as one of the most interesting villains in fighting games and adding comments on his little changed design across the series. He was listed as the 78th "most dastardly ne'er-do-wells" villains on video game by GamesRadar. Edge described him as "a legendary fighting game villain", and cited the impact of his supposed death in Tekken 5. Both Kotaku and Game Informer have labelled him as one of the worst parents in video game history because of how he treats his relatives Kazuya and Jin. Den of Geek ranked Heihachi as the 9th best fighting game character, adding "The grand dame of the Tekken series, Mr Mishima Senior is one of only a handful of characters to have appeared in each of the main entries in Namco's legendary brawler." His character design, however, has been the subject of criticism due to ridiculous it looks. His younger appearance in Tekken Tag Tournament 2 resulted in surprising reactions by critics who mainly pointed his hair. PlayStation Universe included Heihachi and Kazuya among the top 5 rival pairs in Tekken Tag Tournament 2 based on the potential a team up the two can make. Heihachi has also been rivaled with Capcom's characters including M. Bison and Gen due to their portrayals as in the games.

Heihachi's role in the story of Tekken 7 was met with mixed responses. This was mainly due to how both he and his son are the center of the narrative and the resolution might not appeal to most players despite scenes within the game showing nostalgic value. The character's final fight in Tekken 7 has been noted to be one of the hardest for newcomers due to how much more powerful he is than Kazuya, his rival. However, Akuma was noted to be far more challenging than Heihachi's fight. Although the apparent demise of Heihachi in Tekken 7 appear to be important for the franchise's narrative, Inverse felt his initial absence from Tekken 8 was felt the by the audience until the DLC announcement. The website noticed similarities of franchise reviving supposed dead villains like M. Bison in Street Fighter 6. Destructoid had previously considered Heihahci's previous incarnations to involve ridiculous action as he had been nearly killed by Kazuya in the first game and once again in the fifth, making the new return not to feel unreal. However, Destructoid said that game designer Katsuhiro Harada comes across as a liar as a result of promoting the final fight of Heihachi in previous interviews.

Journalists have also commented on Heihachi's role in other games and adaptations, most notably Soulcalibur II. On the other hand, Arcade Sushi listed Heihachi for his appearance in Soulcalibur as one of the "worst fighting game guest stars". In a review of the first Tekken live-action film, DVD Talk had negative opinions on Kazuya and Heihachi's subplot regarding their rivalry. THEM Anime Reviews criticized poorly pronunciation of Heihachi's name in the anime film of the series. Anime News Network joked about how ridiculously evil Heihachi is seen in the film due to how he nearly kills Kazuya. The Fandom Post enjoyed Heihachi's fight against Kazuya in the Western comics while also noting that the comic gave him more honor than his son. Polygon praised the role of Heihachi in Tekken: Bloodline citing "Even though he may seem at first glance like the same “hard-ass martial arts master” archetype we've seen time and time again, the show faithfully paints Heihachi as both a fighter and a CEO of a major corporation, and it's fun to watch him apply his “no mercy” rules of fighting in a business setting."
