= Katsuhiro Harada =

Japanese video game director and producer (born 1970)

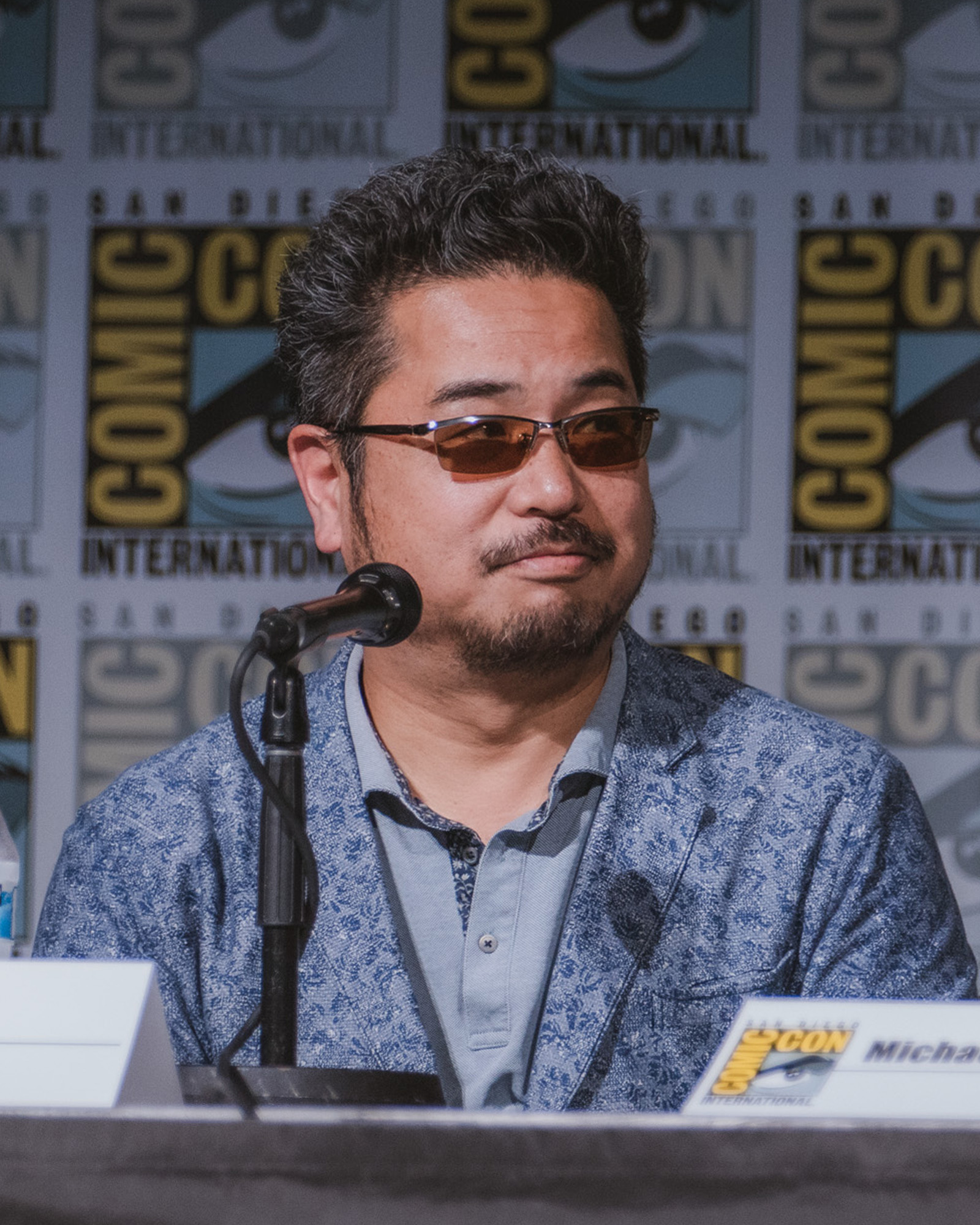
- Harada in 2023
- Born: June 10, 1970 (age 56); Osaka, Japan
- Education: Waseda University
- Occupations: Director; producer
- Years active: 1994–present
- Employers: Bandai Namco Entertainment (1994–2025); SNK (2026–present)
- Notable work: Tekken series
- Title: General Manager

Katsuhiro Harada (原田 勝弘, Harada Katsuhiro; born June 10, 1970) is a Japanese game director and producer who is currently CEO of SNK VS Studio. He is best known for his time at Bandai Namco Entertainment and for his work on the fighting game series Tekken.

== Biography ==
Harada was born in Osaka, Japan, and grew up within the Nara Prefecture region. He later moved to Tokyo, Japan. During his childhood, video games were viewed with a great deal of suspicion in Japan. His parents would not buy him a home console, and as a result often sneaked into arcade centres, where he would occasionally be discovered and dragged out. He worked hard and ended up securing a place at Waseda University. He has studied judo, karate, and a little bit of taekwondo in the past. He attended Waseda University along with Dead or Alive creator Tomonobu Itagaki and holds a degree in psychology. While studying, he took a few Chinese language courses, albeit finding it very difficult. After graduating from university, he joined Namco to become a promoter. His parents were initially unhappy with his pursuit in a career with the video game industry, but have since accepted him in his work.

Harada achieved his success by appealing to higher-ups. Towards the end of the first year at Namco, they gave him a position on the first Tekken title.

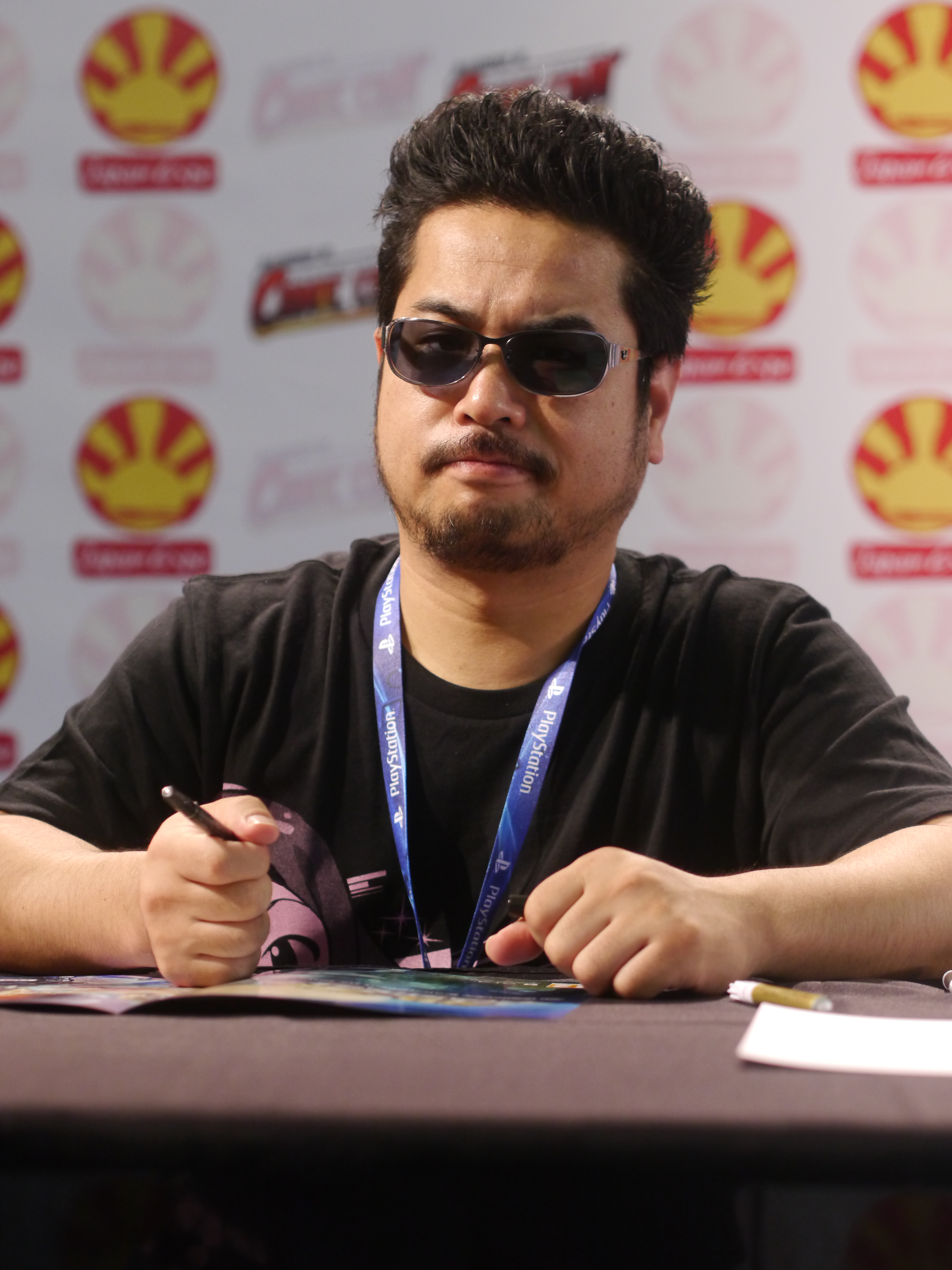
Harada in 2013

He voiced Forest Law in Tekken 3 and Tekken Tag Tournament, Marshall Law from Tekken until Tekken 5: Dark Resurrection, Yoshimitsu from Tekken until Tekken Tag Tournament, and Kunimitsu in Tekken. He is known within the fanbase for his sense of humor, such as his comical rivalry with former Street Fighter producer (producer from 2008 to 2020), Yoshinori Ono, jokes around the character Leo Kliesen in Tekken 6 because of their ambiguous gender, and for attending EVO 2017 in a shirt that read "Don't Ask Me for Shit". Harada was also a member of Project Soul (the team behind the Soulcalibur franchise) and makes an appearance in Soulcalibur V as a bonus character.

In 2019, Harada had been promoted to lead the fighting game esports division of Bandai Namco, as well as to being a general manager at the company overall. On December 8, 2025, he announced that he would be departing from Bandai Namco at the end of the year, ending his thirty-one year tenure with the company.

In May 2026, it was announced that Harada established VS Studio, a subsidiary of SNK, where he became the CEO.

== Ludography ==
| Year | Title | Position |
|---|---|---|
| 1994 | Tekken | Voice actor (Marshall Law, Yoshimitsu, Kunimitsu) |
| 1995 | Tekken 2 | Voice actor (Marshall Law, Yoshimitsu) |
| 1997 | Tekken 3 | Director, voice actor (Yoshimitsu, Forest Law) |
| 1999 | Tekken Tag Tournament | Director, voice actor (Yoshimitsu, Forest Law) |
| 2001 | Tekken 4 | Director, voice actor (Marshall Law) |
| 2001 | Tekken Advance | Director |
| 2004 | Tekken 5 | Director, voice actor (Marshall Law) |
| 2005 | Tekken 5: Dark Resurrection | Project supervisor, voice actor (Marshall Law) |
| 2007 | Soulcalibur Legends | Contributor |
| 2007 | Tekken 6 | Executive producer |
| 2008 | Tekken 6: Bloodline Rebellion | Executive producer |
| 2008 | Soulcalibur IV | Co-director |
| 2011 | Ace Combat: Assault Horizon | Game concept supervisor |
| 2011 | Tekken Tag Tournament 2 | Executive producer |
| 2012 | Project X Zone | Supervisor |
| 2012 | Street Fighter X Tekken | Director |
| 2012 | Tekken 3D: Prime Edition | Executive producer |
| 2012 | Hyperdimension Neptunia Victory | Voice actor (Kuma) |
| 2012 | PlayStation All-Stars Battle Royale | Supervisor |
| 2013 | Tekken Revolution | Executive producer |
| 2014 | Ace Combat Infinity | Project leader |
| 2015 | Digimon Story: Cyber Sleuth | Supervisor |
| 2015 | Tekken 7 | Director |
| 2015 | Pokkén Tournament | Producer |
| 2015 | Lost Reavers | Executive producer |
| 2016 | Tekken 7: Fated Retribution | Director |
| 2016 | Summer Lesson | Chief producer |
| 2016 | Project X Zone 2 | Supervisor, global marketing general manager |
| 2016 | Dark Souls III | Global marketing general manager |
| 2017 | Pokkén Tournament DX | Producer |
| 2018 | Katamari Damacy Reroll | General producer |
| 2018 | Soulcalibur VI | Executive advisor |
| 2018 | Ni no Kuni II: Revenant Kingdom | General manager, worldwide marketing department |
| 2018 | Naruto to Boruto: Shinobi Striker | Global marketing general manager |
| 2018 | My Hero Academia: One's Justice | Global marketing general manager |
| 2018 | God Eater 3 | Global marketing |
| 2018 | Dark Souls: Remastered | Global marketing general manager |
| 2018 | Black Clover: Quartet Knights | Global marketing general manager |
| 2018 | 11-11: Memories Retold | General manager of marketing |
| 2019 | The Dark Pictures: Man of Medan | General producer |
| 2019 | Code Vein | General producer |
| 2019 | Ace Combat 7: Skies Unknown | Marketing general manager |
| 2021 | Tales of Arise | General producer |
| 2022 | Tekken: Bloodline | Executive producer |
| 2024 | Tekken 8 | Executive producer |
| 2025 | Shadow Labyrinth | Executive producer |
