= King (Tekken) =

Tekken character

- Tekken character
- King (left) in Tekken (1994) and King II (right) in Tekken 3 (1997)
- First appearance: King I: Tekken (1994); King II: Tekken 3 (1997)
- Created by: Seiichi Ishii (King I); Katsuhiro Harada (King II)
- Voiced by: Masayuki Hirai (Tekken: Bloodline) (King II, Japanese); Leandro Cano (Tekken: Bloodline) (King II, English)
- Motion capture: Minoru Suzuki; Osami Shibuya

In-universe information
- Fighting style: Professional wrestling
- Origin: Mexico
- Nationality: Mexican

King (キング) is a title used by two characters in Bandai Namco's Tekken fighting game series. The characters were inspired by Japanese professional wrestling character Tiger Mask, as well as Mexican professional wrestler Fray Tormenta, a Catholic priest who became a wrestler in order to support an orphanage. The identity of King has been present in all the main Tekken installments to date, with King I part of the roster in Tekken and Tekken 2, and King II debuting in Tekken 3 and returning for the following main games since.

== Design ==
Tekken 4 featured King with more detailed body features, such as longer hair, a darker skin tone, and a more exposed body

King is widely recognized for the jaguar mask that hides his true identity. Throughout his appearances in the virtual realm, the face beneath his jaguar mask remains a mystery, shrouded in secrecy. The physical portrayal of King's movements was done by the Japanese professional wrestler Minoru Suzuki, who lent his expertise to the character's motion capture sessions. King is a Mexican luchador and series' one of two luchadores overall (the other being Armor King). Fray Tormenta, a Mexican Catholic priest, served as an initial influence on King's character and backstory. King is seen to be mostly growling throughout the Tekken series; however, according to Japanese video game director Katsuhiro Harada, King is capable of speaking Spanish, but he prefers not to. Harada also revealed that King is the most popular Tekken character in Japan over the complete span of the Tekken series.

King is known for his professional wrestling attacks and has an arsenal of huge amounts of moves on his command list. King holds the record for having the most moves in the Tekken series, notably in Tekken Tag Tournament 2 and Tekken 7. King has been able to perform the Sharpshooter since Tekken 2. Other moves he uses include the "Frankensteiner", while his "Muscle Buster" pays homage to Suguru Kinniku's "Kinniku Buster." In Tekken 3, the King moveset got even more detailed with more chain throws, and King received additional new wrestling moves such as Rolling Death Cradle, Winding Nut, Stretch Buster, and many others. Benjamin Turner from GameSpy described King's chain throws in Tekken 5 as "ridiculously intricate". In Tekken 8, King gained some additional moves inspired by famous pro-wrestlers, such as Triple H's Pedigree and Randy Orton's RKO.

== Appearances ==
=== In Tekken ===
==== Tekken—Tekken 2 ====
King I

The first King was used to being a brawling orphan. He was later adopted by a respectful family. He then became a masked wrestler, entered the tournament, and with the intention of preventing them from turning into the type of person he once was, he thought of building an orphanage. In King of Iron Fist Tournament 2, King I encounters fellow wrestler Armor King, who convinced him to return to wrestling once again and to continue participating in tournaments to help the orphanage. King I was later killed by Ogre.

==== Tekken 3—Tekken 8 ====
King II

The second King was a street urchin who was brought up in the first King's orphanage. Until the age of 24, this wrestler worked hard with King until one day, news broke of the first King's death at the hands of Ogre. Seeing that the orphanage would crumble into ruin, this man donned the mask of King and imitated his style. However, since his technique was learned just from watching King, not training with him, he lost every competition he entered. One day, however, a stranger with a black jaguar mask visited the new King, introducing himself as an old friend. This man revealed himself to be Armor King, who was interested in finding out if the rumors of a new King were true. For four years, the two of them trained, and the new King learned quickly, maturing into a forceful wrestler with extreme power, known as King II. By this time, the now 28-year-old wrestler was a worthy heir to the throne, however, he longed to punish the one responsible for the original King's death.

After the third King of Iron Fist Tournament, King II discovered that his master, Armor King, had been killed in a bar fight. The murderer, Craig Marduk, had been arrested in Arizona and was sent to prison. After being released from prison, Marduk challenged King II to a tournament in Tekken 4. King II won. King II then followed him to the hospital to finish him, but decided to spare Marduk after feeling cruel for killing him because of his desire for revenge. However, King II discovered that Marduk in a black jaguar mask, resembling the original Armor King, had challenged King II on television. King II accepted the challenge and defeated Marduk, leading to their friendship. Later, Marduk revealed that he was attacked by the man he was convicted of killing, Armor King. Determined to uncover the truth, King II and Marduk entered the King of Iron Fist Tournament 6. They discovered that the other Armor King was the younger brother of the original.

King II returns as a playable character in Tekken 7, with an alternate costume based on New Japan Pro-Wrestling wrestler "Rainmaker" Kazuchika Okada being available for him in 2017. King II enters the tournament to pay for the hospital bills of Marduk and Armor King II and to reconcile with them and his old orphanage. The next tournament's host Kazuya Mishima reveals himself as a devil and announces the King of Iron Fist tournament 8. King II joins Jin Kazama's side after learning about Kazuya's evil plans. Later, King and other fighters help restore Manhattan while celebrating freedom from G Corporation's tyranny. In his Tekken 8 ending, King II battles a British boxer named Steve Fox in the quarterfinals.

=== Other games ===
King appears in the non-canon Tekken games such as Tekken Tag Tournament, Tekken Card Challenge, Tekken Advance, Tekken Resolute, Tekken Tag Tournament 2, Tekken 3D: Prime Edition, Tekken Arena and Tekken Revolution. King appears as a playable character in crossover fighting game Street Fighter X Tekken. King also made an appearance in the Namco crossover Namco × Capcom with Felicia from the Darkstalkers series as his fighting partner. King appears as a Spirit in the Nintendo crossover video game Super Smash Bros. Ultimate. King appears as a playable character in Fist of the North Star Legends ReVIVE. Namco High, a browser-based dating game, features King in the role of a detention officer.

== In other media ==
=== Animations ===
King I makes a cameo appearance in Tekken: The Motion Picture as one of the tournament competitors. He has no spoken lines, and it is unknown how he progresses through the tournament. He is last seen being carried by Armor King I off the exploding Mishima resort. King II's images are briefly seen in the CGI film Tekken: Blood Vengeance when an Irish woman, Anna Williams, opens a file containing images of various persons of interest.

King II appears in the anime Tekken: Bloodline as a competitor in the King of Iron Fist Tournament. He was an orphan under the original King before his death by Ogre. King II is seen as intimidating due to his animalistic nature. However, his noble side is shown when he visits a Chinese girl, Ling Xiaoyu, in the hospital after their match. Rumors about King II are cleared up when the tournament's participant, Julia Chang, reveals his good nature to the tournament's winner Jin Kazama. Despite his defeat by Jin in the finals, Jin gifts the prize money to King II.

=== Merchandise ===
Epoch Co. released a 1/10 scale King action figure, based on his appearance in Tekken 3. The figure comes with a removable champion belt. Epoch Co. also released a 12-inch King action figure based on his Tekken 4 appearance. In 2017, King was one of the five Tekken characters to receive a Funko Pop. King's Player 2 t-shirts and pants were part of the initial wave of Esther Ng's PRIX line of Tekken 3-inspired merchandise. The date of availability of these items was January 18, 2023.

Storm Collectibles, a Hong Kong-based manufacturer of action figures, released a 1/12 scale King action figure based on his Tekken 7 iteration with interchangeable wrestling capes and pairs of hands. A 17 centimeters King action figure was produced by Game Dimensions with a few additional items, such as a stand to carry a "FIGHT" sign, an extra pair of hands, and a white energy buildup. In 2023, Bandai Namco Toys & Collectibles America revealed two action figures, King and Jin Kazama, each in their Tekken 8 outfit, available later in 2024.

== Critical reception ==
King was given the "Rainmaker" outfit in Tekken 7 that is inspired by Japanese professional wrestler Kazuchika Okada in order to promote the collaboration with New Japan Pro Wrestling.

King is one of the most popular Tekken characters, receiving praise by critics. King was recognized by IGN, with author Bill Barnwell noting the realism of his mask. Henry Gilbert of GamesRadar+ stated about King that "King is notable because he gives the developers an excuse to animate almost every single wrestling move known to man. Watch as King smoothly transitions through accurate recreations of power bombs, surfboards, spinning toe holds, and muscle busters with ease, all leading up to the ultimate move, the Rolling Death Cradle. King is like a walking Wikipedia of moves, all lovingly recreated by developers who clearly care about wrasslin' as much as any fan."

King holds the Guinness World Records title for the "Most moves for a Tekken character" as of the 2011 video game Tekken Tag Tournament 2, with King having 176 amounts of different moves. Although this record was again broken by King himself, with him having 186 different moves in Tekken 7. Tizoc, a character from The King of Fighters, takes inspiration from King and shares similarities with his appearance. Tizoc wears an eagle mask as opposed to King's jaguar mask, which is a clear distinction between the two. In the study titled "Digital Mexican: Visual Representation In Video Games," author Angel Martin Palomares asked participants to discuss how King and King II represent their cultures. Most of the participants rated King as a medium representation; some participants were surprised that King was a part of their culture, while one of the participants stated, "King, being an animal, did not reflect their cultural background." However, in the case of King II, he received overall positive comments from participants. The majority of the participants rated him as a positive representation.

In his examination of Digital Narratives and Linguistic Articulations of Mexican Identities in Emergent Media: Race, Lucha Libre Masks and Mock Spanish, author Daniel Calleros Villarreal discussed the manner in which King and Armor King are being portrayed. He noticed a notable absence of verbal communication and the faceless presentation of these characters in the game. Through his analysis, Villarreal pointed out that the depictions of Mexican subjects in Tekken appear dehumanized due to the absence of speech and the strange facial expressions. Villarreal drew attention to the use of realistic feline wrestling masks as a symbol of the characters' inability to communicate verbally, comparing this depiction to similar sub-human anthropomorphic figures.
