= Tekken 3D: Prime Edition =

2012 video game

- North American box art
- Developers: Arika; Namco Bandai Games
- Publisher: Namco Bandai Games (Note: Released under the Namco label)
- Producer: Katsuhiro Harada
- Composers: Ayako Saso; Yousuke Yasui; Kazuhiro Kobayashi; Takahiro Eguchi
- Series: Tekken
- Platform: Nintendo 3DS
- Release: NA: February 14, 2012; JP: February 16, 2012; EU: February 17, 2012; AU: February 23, 2012
- Genre: Fighting

Tekken 3D: Prime Edition (Note: Japanese: 鉄拳3D プライムエディション, Hepburn: Tekken Surī Dī Puraimu Edishon) is a 2012 fighting game developed by Arika and Namco Bandai Games and published by Namco Bandai Games for the Nintendo 3DS. It is the second Tekken game to be released for a Nintendo platform after the 2001 video game Tekken Advance. The game is a graphically updated version of Tekken 6 for the Nintendo 3DS, supporting the handheld's 3D capabilities and maintaining a steady 60 FPS even when running in 3D; however, the 3D is disabled during wireless play. 41 characters are included in the game, as well as 700 collectable Tekken cards. In addition, the 2011 film Tekken: Blood Vengeance is included in the package.

== Development ==
During its press conference at E3, Nintendo announced Tekken would be coming to the 3DS handheld. At Namco Bandai Games' booth at E3, a demo of the Tekken engine running on 3DS was shown. Series producer Katsuhiro Harada stated that the game would run in full 60 frames per second even with the 3DS' 3D effect enabled.

On August 17, 2011, a trailer for Tekken 3D: Prime Edition was released, unveiling the game's final name. The trailer revealed that the game would include over 40 characters, as well as a stereoscopic 3D version of the Tekken: Blood Vengeance film within the game's cartridge. Prime Edition contains roughly 700 artwork cards consisting of stills from Blood Vengeance. These cards can be shared via StreetPass. Prior to release, it was announced that the game would have 21 Tag Challenges; however, these are fully absent from the retail game. Additionally, 40 stages that were originally planned for the game did not feature in the final release.

All characters retain their two available costumes from Tekken 6, unlike in Tekken Tag Tournament 2. A new Color Edit feature was added, which enables users to change the color palettes of characters' costumes.

== Release ==
European and Australian releases of the game were distributed by Nintendo.

== Characters ==
All 41 fighters from Tekken 6 return in this game. Heihachi Mishima, while present, appears younger as he was in the original Tekken and Tekken 2, due to drinking a serum to regain his youth as per the storyline of Tekken Tag Tournament 2. It is believed that this is due to the death of the character's previous voice actor, Daisuke Gōri.

- Alisa Bosconovitch
- Anna Williams
- Armor King II
- Asuka Kazama
- Baek Doo San
- Bob Richards
- Bruce Irvin
- Bryan Fury
- Christie Monteiro
- Craig Marduk
- Devil Jin
- Eddy Gordo
- Feng Wei
- Ganryu
- Heihachi Mishima
- Hwoarang
- JACK-6
- Jin Kazama
- Julia Chang
- Kazuya Mishima
- King II
- Kuma II
- Lars Alexandersson
- Lee Chaolan
- Lei Wulong
- Leo Kliesen
- Lili De Rochefort
- Ling Xiaoyu
- Marshall Law
- Miguel Caballero Rojo
- Mokujin
- Nina Williams
- Panda
- Paul Phoenix
- Raven
- Roger Jr.
- Sergei Dragunov
- Steve Fox
- Wang Jinrei
- Yoshimitsu
- Zafina

== Reception ==
Reception

Aggregate score
Aggregator	Score
Metacritic	64/100

Review scores
Publication	Score
Eurogamer	7/10
GameSpot	6.5/10
GamesRadar+	2.5/5
IGN	7.5/10
Nintendo Life	7/10
Nintendo World Report	4.5/10
The Guardian	2/5

Tekken 3D: Prime Edition received "mixed or average" reviews from critics, according to the review aggregation website Metacritic. IGN has greatly praised the game's visuals and good framerate, but it lamented its lack of game modes and low replay value. GameSpot stated that while it looked and played very well, the game seemed incomplete. GamesRadar gave the game 5/10, praising its high character roster and graphics, but criticising its lack of single player modes.
