= Ian Dale =

Ian Dale or Iain Dale may refer to:

- Ian Anthony Dale (born 1978), American actor
- Iain Dale (born 1962), British broadcaster and conservative blogger
