= Tekken: Blood Vengeance =

- Japanese theatrical release poster
- Directed by: Yōichi Mōri
- Screenplay by: Dai Satō
- Based on: Tekken by Namco Bandai Games
- Produced by: Yoshinari Mizushima
- Starring: Maaya Sakamoto; Yuki Matsuoka; Mamoru Miyano; Unshō Ishizuka; Masanori Shinohara; Isshin Chiba; Atsuko Tanaka; Akeno Watanabe; Ryōtarō Okiayu; Hidenari Ugaki; Taketora; Keiko Nemoto
- Music by: Hitoshi Sakimoto
- Production company: Digital Frontier
- Distributed by: Asmik Ace Entertainment; Namco Pictures
- Release dates: July 26, 2011 (United States); September 3, 2011 (Japan)
- Running time: 92 minutes
- Country: Japan
- Language: Japanese

Tekken: Blood Vengeance (Japanese: 鉄拳 ブラッド・ベンジェンス, Hepburn: Tekken Buraddo Benjensu) is a 2011 Japanese animated science fiction martial arts film directed by Yōichi Mōri from a screenplay by Dai Satō, based on the video game series Tekken published by Namco Bandai Games. The film places focus on the young martial artist Ling Xiaoyu, who investigates experiments involving a supernatural curse related with the Mishima family, while befriending a robot named Alisa Bosconovitch. The two meet the test subject Shin Kamiya, who is being sought by his former friend Jin Kazama and his father Kazuya Mishima, but is also being used by Heihachi Mishima to set a new family fight.

Satō was given freedom by the video game series' executive director Katsuhiro Harada to write the film, which led him to the idea of Blood Vengeance being a buddy film by two female characters from different generations of video games. Tekken: Blood Vengeance was released in the United States by Bandai Entertainment on July 26, 2011, and in Australia on July 27, 2011, in a special exclusive one-off screening. It was released in Japan on September 3, 2011, by Namco Pictures. The film was released on Blu-ray Disc (included on the disc of the video game collection Tekken Hybrid) in the United States on November 22, 2011, and in Japan on December 1, 2011. The 2D version of the film was also released as a standalone DVD on November 22, 2011, in the US, and December 22, 2011, in Japan. It was later included with the video game Tekken 3D: Prime Edition.

The film was praised for its visuals and fight sequences, but criticized for its short length and few characters who have little impact in the story. Nevertheless, the film attracted Western audiences upon release. It was often considered as one of the best adaptations based on the video game series.

== Plot ==
The plot, which takes place in an alternate storyline between the events of Tekken 5 and Tekken 6, begins with Anna Williams setting up a decoy for her sister, Nina Williams, who is currently working with the new head of the Mishima Zaibatsu, Jin Kazama. Anna, on the other hand, works for Jin's father, Kazuya Mishima and its rival organization, G Corporation. Both are seeking information about a student named Shin Kamiya, and Anna dispatches a Chinese student, Ling Xiaoyu to act as a spy, while Jin sends humanoid Russian AI robot Alisa Bosconovitch for a similar purpose.

During their investigation, Xiaoyu and Alisa form a friendship, unaware that the other is working for their enemy, although they are forced to turn against one another when Shin is captured by an unknown assailant. It is here that Alisa is revealed to be a cyborg - although Alisa believes she possesses human qualities after she spares Xiaoyu's life. After coming to terms with each other, Xiaoyu is abandoned by Anna and G Corporation, and the two girls flee from their previous organizations, taking refuge in their teacher, Lee Chaolan's mansion.

Xiaoyu and Alisa eventually discover genetic experiments had been done on Shin and his classmates, and believe that the Mishima family is seeking Shin, the sole survivor, and M gene subject, for his immortality. The pair discover that this had in fact, been an elaborate plan engineered by Heihachi Mishima, who used Shin to lure Kazuya and Jin and get the Devil Gene. After Heihachi disposes of Shin, he, Kazuya and Jin engage in a triple threat brawl. During the fight, Kazuya and Jin become their devil forms. Ultimately, Jin is the victor, utilizing his devil powers. Heihachi then unleashes the ancient spirits of the Mokujins and a final fist burst by Alisa leaves Mokujin Heihachi open. Jin finishes him off, by an eye blast which slices it in half. Jin then leaves, telling Xiaoyu that he awaits a future challenge.

The film ends with Alisa and Xiaoyu back at their school's festival, with the pair planning to enter the next King of Iron Fist Tournament.

== Cast ==
Character	Japanese voice actor	English dubbing actor
Ling Xiaoyu	Maaya Sakamoto	Carrie Keranen
Alisa Bosconovitch	Yuki Matsuoka	Cristina Vee
Shin Kamiya	Mamoru Miyano	David Vincent
Heihachi Mishima	Unshō Ishizuka	Taylor Henry
Kazuya Mishima	Masanori Shinohara	Kyle Hebert
Jin Kazama	Isshin Chiba	Darren Daniels
Nina Williams	Atsuko Tanaka	Charlotte Bell
Anna Williams	Akeno Watanabe	Tara Platt
Lee Chaolan	Ryōtarō Okiayu	Kaiji Tang
Ganryu	Hidenari Ugaki	George C. Cole
Panda	Taketora	Taketora
Mokujin	Keiko Nemoto	Charlotte Bell

== Production ==
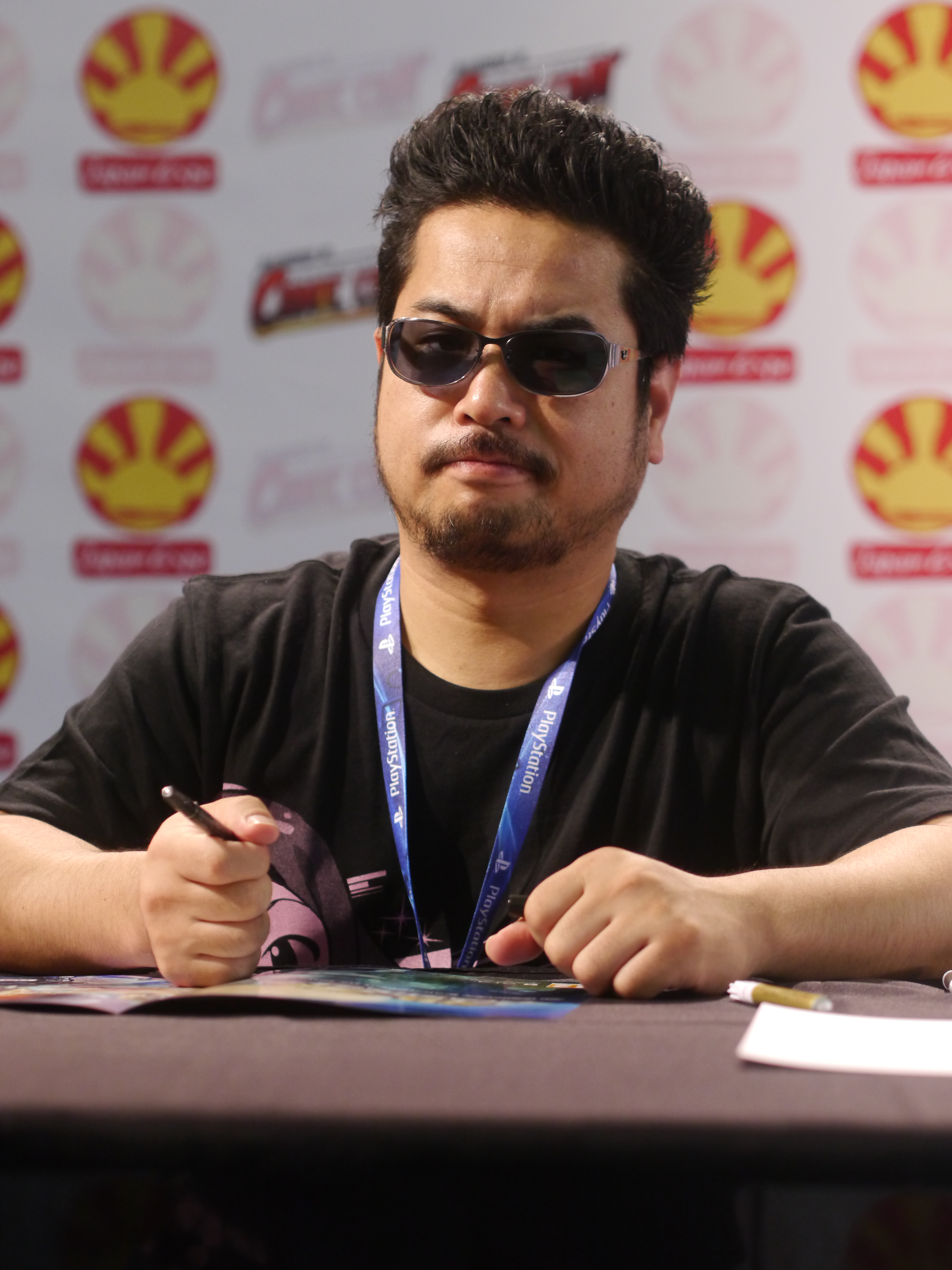
Game producer Katsuhiro Harada oversaw the Tekken movie.

Development of the movie started in January 2010. Namco's Tekken team had wanted to do a 3D movie after the creation of the CG opening for Tekken 6's scenario campaign. Katsuhiro Harada explained the success of Tekken 3 by saying that by that installment, the team was able to create CGI scenes for every character as well as how fans demanded to know more of the cast. Namco could have made a CGI movie 15 years before the release because the studio already had the technology and the skills to do it, but it needed a lot of computing power and above all a lot of time and financial resources, so Namco preferred to focus on video games. It is the association with the Digital Frontier famous for developing the film Resident Evil Degeneration. That allowed Namco film and continue to work on our games. Namco was already associated with Digital Frontier during Tekken 5 and they had helped with making the CGI scenes for both the game and Tekken 6. Harada wanted Blood Vengeance to emulate the success of Degeneration as well the game adaptation film Final Fantasy VII Advent Children, remarking the quality of animation too.

Director Yōichi Mōri said CG facial animations contain a lot of information, so he was worried about the post-recording. He wanted the visuals to illustrate the characters' personalities properly. Mōri requested Takayuki Takeya, who is famous designing Devilman and Kamen Rider, to redesign the Devils featured in the game to give a more "sinister yet beautiful" design the audience give a different impression from the game in order to attract more people to watch the movie. The role producer was given to Yoshinari Mizushima (水島能成) who has worked in the franchise since Tekken 2, while storyboard artists include Tensai Okamura, Shinji Higuchi, Masayuki Miyaji, Soichi Masui, and Kazuyoshi Katayama. The film was envisioned as an alternative story that happens between the events of Tekken 5 and Tekken 6.

The Devil forms of Kazuya (left) and Jin were redesigned at the request of the director.

In regards to the voice acting, Harada explained that a new one was created due to the differences the movie has with the games; In the latest games every character spoke their own language and understood each other regardless of difference. The film was given two languages: Japanese and English. As a result, several new actors performed the roles of the returning characters. The role of Ling Xiaoyu was given to veteran voice actress, Maaya Sakamoto. Mōri enjoyed Sakamoto's performance, believing her work turned Xiaoyu into a beautiful woman while also noting how Mamoru Miyano gave Shin an air of mystery.

Harada provided input when it came to action scenes, sound and mouse. Dai Satō is the screenplayer who was chosen by Harada to bring a more creative scenario, thus leading Satō to have more freedom. The director was Yōichi Mōri. With these staff members, Harada was confident the movie would be successful. In the film adaptation process, the staff imagined the opening movie for the scenario campaign mode included in the consumer version of Tekken 6 released in 2009. With the new character Lars Alexanderson as the main character, the game version staff including Katsuhiro Harada, the project director of the Tekken series, worked on the video that combines intense action and deep storytelling. Mizushima, who worked on the production, said, "When I saw the finish of that video, I was convinced that it would be a movie. Rather, I wanted to see a feature-length movie by this staff." Satō read the plot created by the game version staff, but while referring to them, he wrote a completely new original story to attrat a new audience. The film also heavily uses motion actors for the fight scenes which surprised Harada. Kensuke Sonomura was in charge of all fight scenes with Satō wanting the fights to be exclusive to the franchise. There was a heavy focus in the film encounter between Jin, Kazuya and Heihachi as it was more challenging than common one-on-one battles. The setting was intentionally made to be enjoyed across the multiple fanbases Tekken has worldwide.

=== Scenario ===
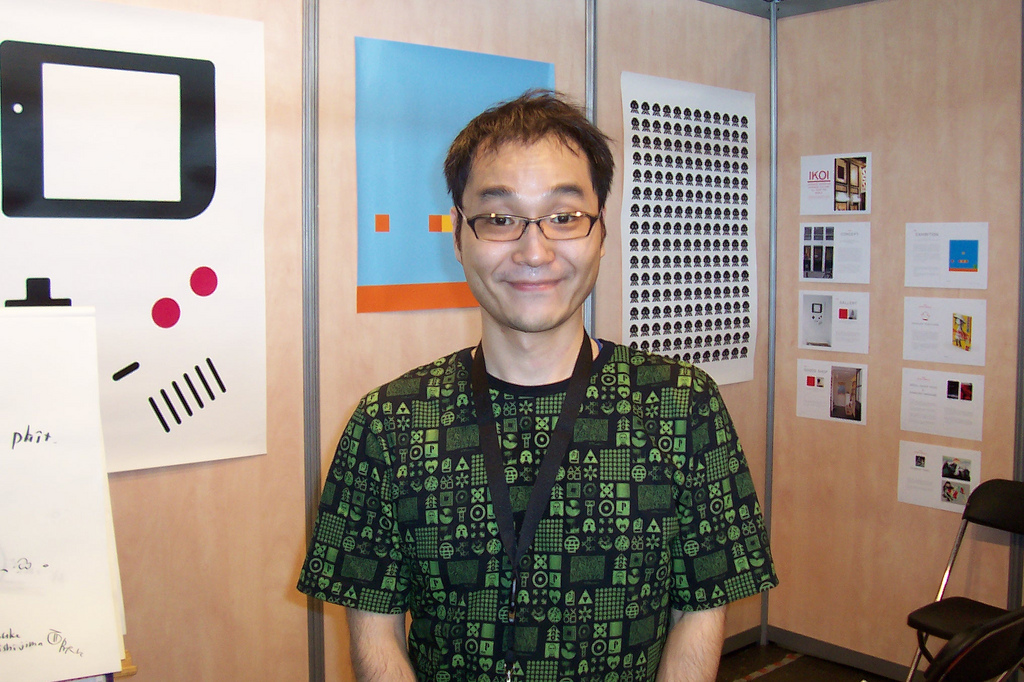
Writer Dai Satō was chosen by Katsuhiro Harada for his experience in his career and was given freedom in regards to how to expand the franchise.

When the project began, Harada originally wanted all the characters to make an appearance. However, due to need of screentime, the movie would have lacked any coherent narrative as a result. This led to the usage of fewer characters. In the games Harada says the story primarily focuses on the rivalries in the Mishima clan. However, Satō's usage faces Xiaoyu and Alisa Bosconovitch the heroines of the story was a new point of view that Harada had not thought of and thus find the result very interesting to follow. Satō said in 2011 that he had chosen her as one of the two lead characters because he felt Alisa is "the face of the franchise's future". Meanwhile, Xiaoyu "symbolize[d] the older Tekken games". Alisa and Xiaoyu were inspired by heroines movies in common in Hollywood. The family drama between the Mishimas and the Williams was noted to be the highlight of the franchise who the heroines explore. Satō always wanted the story to be set around the conflict between the Mishimas though explored from another point of view. In order to make it more unique, the story was given a school feeling based on Satō's preferences as well as how relatable it can be.

Satō had been a fan of the Tekken games and played the arcade version of the third installment as part of research. As he discussed the handling of these leads with Harada, Satō claims he wanted to use these characters since they come across as weak, something which he believes films require in order to undergo a character arc, common in coming-of-age story stories. Alisa in particular appealed to him because of how different she made the franchise from other fighting game series. A new character named Shin Kamiya appears in the movie in order to provide a reason to feature Heihachi Mishima and further explore the lore behind the Devil Gene. Shin was written to die early in the movie on purpose to show the dangers of the Gene as it could only be used by Jin and Kazuya. Heihachi's transformation into a giant monster was also an idea written by Satō to produce something unique. The Williams sisters and Kazuya and Jin were added more in the fashion of eye-candy in contrast to the main characters. Mizushima says that he also wanted to give the story a suspense tone through Shin's side.

The team worked to provide several elements including action, comedy, drama among others. Satō described it as a "female buddy film" as he wanted to have more characters than just the Mishima conflict from the games. Additionally, the writer wanted it to be accessible. Xiaoyu was written to be relatable to the audience and balance the more supernatural elements in the process. Xiaoyu's relationship with Alisa was made so that the latter develops a "soul" as the film progresses. This surprised her own voice actress not only due to her design but how much of a bigger role she had. In regards to the Mishima feud, Satō describes them as horrible people but wanted to give Jin's characterization a different take from his relatives. Meanwhile, according to Satō, Kazuya represents the "core" of the franchise, finding his antagonism and strength as a charm for the plot. Kazuya's actor also liked how his character stands up as a villain. In contrast to the games, the film uses more facial expressions as it helps them humanize. In the final scenes, the sight of Alisa, bruised and wrecked, summoning her final strength was influenced by Terminator 2 and Aliens. This scene was storyboarded by Shinji Higuchi much to Satō's joy as it was his favorite.

=== Music ===
The music of the film was composed by Hitoshi Sakimoto alongside fellow composers from Basiscape. As the staff felt that Tekken feels more like a live action film rather than an anime, composer Hitoshi Sakimoto was requested to make the music Hollywood-like. Orchestral pieces were used for the soundtrack. Despite the heavy focus on violence, Sakimoto was asked by the director to make the music more fitting for Xiaoyu and Alisa's friendship which led to a lighter tone. Harada was surprised by the final product due to his changed impression of the two heroines as they came across filled with more emotions. Basiscape includes other composers such as Yoshimi Kudo, Masaharu Iwata, Kimihiro Abe among others. The official soundtrack was released on July 27, 2011, on the Namco Sounds label for the Digital Edition and Basiscape Records for the CD Edition.

== Release ==
The film was initially announced at Namco's "LevelUp" event in Dubai on May 5, 2011. A trailer premiered at the event and also was posted online shortly after. Harada has been very clear that this movie is not related to the 2009 live-action film and is doing whatever he can to ensure this project is distanced as much as possible from that film. "That doesn't have anything to do with it this time," Harada insisted. "We're not trying to rewrite those wrongs. Fans are always asking us for a 3D movie. This is our response to them... We want to make a movie that everyone can enjoy, though. Not just Tekken fans."

On July 23, 2011, Namco Bandai previewed Tekken: Blood Vengeance at Comic-Con with writer Satō, and voice actresses Carrie Keranen and Cristina Vee as guests. It was also screened in the United Kingdom during 2011.

The film was released in both Blu-ray and DVD formats on November 22, 2011, in North America, in Blu-ray format on December 1, 2011, in Japan, and in DVD format on December 22, 2011, in Japan. The Blu-ray 2D/3D version was released as a Hybrid Disc, known as Tekken Hybrid. Whilst the film can be played on any Blu-ray player, running the disc on a PlayStation 3 console will allow owners to also play an HD version of the original Tekken Tag Tournament, which was originally released in the arcades in 1999 and for PlayStation 2 in 2000, as well as a demo version of Tekken Tag Tournament 2. A 3D version of the movie was made available in Tekken 3D: Prime Edition for the Nintendo 3DS. It is the first film to be released for the 3DS.

== Reception ==
=== Critical response ===
Tekken: Blood Vengeance has received mixed reviews with many comparing it to Tekken: The Motion Picture and the 2009 live-action film. IGN's Steven Hooper claimed that despite pacing issues, the plot is benefitted from appealing fight sequences and stylish CGI. PALGN's agreed, also enjoying the story. Engadget's Eric Kaoili found the film "pleasing" felt the video player was "garbage". Capsule Monsters praised its campy humor like Shin talking about his body while being naked or Alisa's crush but felt the ending was too forced as the two protagonists are overshadowed by Jin, Kazuya and Heihachi. Spong felt that the fight between the Mishimas was hilarious due to how brutal it was while other elements of the movie made it enjoyable to see for the unintentionally comedy caused by the film's attempt to write generate drama.

The two leads and Shin were the subject of mixed responses as being unimportant in comparison to the Mishima crudge. Capsule Monsters criticized how Xiaoyu loses importance in the movie in the climax when the Mishimas start fighting. Nevertheless, he still found earlier scenes about her search for Shin Kamiya alongside Alisa to be hilarious in an accidental way. Spong was more negative, criticizing her adventure which started Alisa's character arc which came across as fanservice such as one where Xiaoyu is nearly naked in company of her. Dread Central also criticized the subplot involving the two Williams sisters, claiming there was little focus on them and there is no solution to their rivalry similar to the Mishimas. Dread Central was also critical of the overuse of the Devil Gene subplot, while comparing Jin and Kazuya's transformations to the series Devilman which leads to a Godzilla-like fight scene in the climax when Heihachi combines with the Mokujins.

=== Legacy ===
The Japanese Committee of the International 3D Society honored Tekken: Blood Vengeance along with Always Sanchōme no Yūhi '64, Kaibutsu-kun and Sadako 3D at the second annual International 3D Awards Lumiere Japan, where all four films won the Movie Award. The film also won the International Jury Prize (Japan) at the International 3D Society's fourth annual 3D Creative Arts Awards.

According to Anime News Network, the film has been popular in the United Kingdom based on sales from 2012, taking third place behind Arrietty and Pokémon: Destiny Deoxys.

Shin was one of the proposed character concepts as a playable character in Tekken Revolution. The developer found it difficult to make him as a playable character due to his lack of knowledge in martial arts and the fact that he died in the film he appeared in, although there was an idea to make him an immortal character.

In retrospect, Harada believes the film lives up to the requests fans used to make about the series. Should a sequel be done, Satō expressed a desire to use Asuka Kazama and Lili as the new leading duo especially because the latter comes across as "versatile".

Digital Frontier got more experienced with the handling of the visuals with Blood Vengeance which led to an easier development for Resident Evil Damnation.

== See also ==
- List of films based on video games
- List of martial arts films
