= Tekken: The Motion Picture =

1998 film by Kunihisa Sugishima

- Tekken
- Cover art of the DVD release by ADV films

鉄拳 -TEKKEN- (Tekken)
- Original video animation
- Directed by: Kunihisa Sugishima
- Produced by: Akira Saigoku; Yoshimasa Mori; Yumiko Masujima; Masahiro Toyozumi
- Written by: Ryōta Yamaguchi
- Music by: Kazuhiko Toyama
- Studio: Studio Deen
- Licensed by: NA: ADV Films
- Released: January 21, 1998 – February 21, 1998
- Runtime: 30 minutes (individual OVAs); 60 minutes (ADV release)
- Episodes: 2

Tekken: The Motion Picture (鉄拳 -TEKKEN-) is an anime adaptation of the Tekken fighting video game series by Namco. Produced by ASCII Corporation and Sony Music Entertainment Japan and animated by Studio Deen, it was originally released in Japan as a two-episode OVA in 1998, and as a full-length feature for Western releases. It was one of the first original video animations to use digital ink and paint.

The film's story is not canon, but is loosely based on the first game, where Kazuya is the main character and Heihachi is the Head of the Mishima Zaibatsu, and Tekken 2, which features Jun and Lei's investigation of the Zaibatsu's illegal activities, although it also incorporates some elements from Tekken 3.

== Plot ==
As a child, Jun Kazama watches as Kazuya Mishima is thrown off a cliff by his ruthless father, Heihachi, who deems him as weak and kind-hearted due to the kindness he was shown by his late mother. She attempts to locate him, but fails and Kazuya is presumed dead. Kazuya, however, only barely survives and swears revenge, selling his soul to the Devil in exchange for his own survival.

Sixteen years later, Jun works as an Interpol agent and is assigned a partner, Lei Wulong, to investigate Mishima Zaibatsu for alleged inhumane experiments on animals by infiltrating the upcoming King of Iron Fist Tournament, and recognizes the head of the Zaibatsu as Heihachi from a photo. Kazuya, now an undefeated fighting champion, also plans to enter, hoping for a chance at revenge. Heihachi's adopted son, Lee Chaolan, however, attempts numerous times to have Kazuya killed in advance by Nina and Anna Williams, as Heihachi plans to bequeath the Mishima Zaibatsu to Kazuya should Kazuya defeat him at the tournament, but neither are able to succeed. Jun and Lei board a boat heading for Mishima Island, where the tournament will take place, in the process witnessing a huge man named Jack easily fight his way aboard past Lee's bodyguard, former kickboxing champion Bruce Irvin along with his young companion, Jane. Jun sees Kazuya jump aboard the ship from a bridge and later confronts him in the gym about his past, and attempts to persuade him to stand down, but Kazuya refuses. Nina and Anna attack again but both Kazuya and Jun escape, only strengthening Kazuya's determination to kill both Heihachi and Lee, and threatens to kill Jun as well if she interferes again.

On the day of the tournament, Lei infiltrates the island's underground facility. He is ambushed by guards but saved by Jack, who seeks out the Zaibatsu's captive scientist Dr. Bosconovitch in order to cure Jane, who is terminally ill. As they fight their way through numerous prototype androids resembling Jack dubbed Prototype Jack, Jack's arm is gashed and Lei discovers he is also an android. They finally locate Bosconovitch, who treats Jane and confesses the Mishima Zaibatsu's illegal activities to Lei by showing them Roger, an Australian kangaroo who has been enhanced with boxing abilities but maintained his friendly attitude. Meanwhile, Kazuya fights his way through the tournament and beats both Baek Doo San and Michelle Chang. Michelle refuses to surrender and begs Kazuya to let her face Heihachi since he burned her village down and killed her parents. Though sympathetic, Kazuya refuses and almost kills Michelle before Jun catches up and stops him. Before the two can fight, Lee unleashes a pack of genetically-enhanced dinosaurs into the field to kill Kazuya and the other competitors so that no one will win the tournament. One devours Anna while Nina escapes. Kazuya taps into his inner power and kills all but one of them before reaching the tower where Heihachi awaits him. After fighting his way past Lee, Kazuya confronts Heihachi and the two fight. In response, Lee activates the island's self-destruction sequence, intending to kill himself and take his family with him.

Heihachi takes the upper hand and severely beats Kazuya. Jun intervenes and demands to know why Heihachi threw him into the canyon, and Heihachi reveals that after viewing the corruption of civilization, he sought to instill the power of the Devil within Kazuya via tragedy so that he would become his successor and lead the Zaibatsu to conquer the world and bring it under Mishima rule. At Heihachi's goading, Kazuya succumbs to the Devil and overpowers Heihachi, viciously pummelling him as the island begins to fall apart. Before Kazuya can finish Heihachi by throwing him into a river of lava, Jun manages to reach into Kazuya's heart by returning him his mother's locket, reminding him of the kindness she showed him and enabling him to expel the Devil for good, reverting him to his original kind-hearted self. Enraged, Heihachi tries to kill both Kazuya and Jun, and the three of them fall from the cliff. As the island begins to crumble, Lei, Jack, Jane, and Bosconovitch flee the facility, but Jack sacrifices himself to hold the door open long enough for his friends to escape, asking Lei and Bosconovitch to take care of Jane for him. The remaining competitors escape from the burning forest as Kazuya emerges with the unconscious Jun. They escape the island while Heihachi flees in a jet as the island finally explodes.

In the epilogue, set a few years later, Jun is accosted by Jin, her young son with Kazuya; Kazuya and Heihachi's whereabouts are left unrevealed. Though Jun senses something is wrong, she dismisses Jin's concern and they walk home together.

== Characters ==
Main

| Character | Japanese voice actor | English dubbing actor |
|---|---|---|
| Kazuya Mishima / Devil | Kazuhiro Yamaji | Adam Dudley |
| Heihachi Mishima | Daisuke Gōri | John Paul Shepard |
| Jun Kazama | Yumi Tōma | Edi Patterson |

Secondary

| Character | Japanese voice actor | English dubbing actor |
|---|---|---|
| Lei Wulong | Akio Nakamura | Gray Haddock |
| Lee Chaolan | Shin-ichiro Miki | David Stokey |
| Nina Williams | Minami Takayama | Ellie McBride |
| Anna Williams | Kaori Yamagata | Claire Hamilton |
| Young Jun | Eri Sendai | Lucy Farris |
| Young Kazuya | Minami Takayama | Jacob Franchek |
| Michelle Chang | Narumi Hidaka | Jessica Robertson |
| Jack-2 | Akio Ōtsuka | Mark O'Brien |
| Jane | | Jessica Schwatz |
| Dr. Bosconovitch | Tamio Ōki | Ken Webster |
| Bruce Irvin | Seiji Sasaki | Peter Harrell Jr. |
| Jin Kazama | Minami Takayama | Jacob Franchek |
| Baek Doo San | Kyousei Tsukui | Lowell B. Bartholomee |
| Ganryu | Takashi Nagasako | Lowell B. Bartholomee |

Tekken 1 cameos

Wang Jinrei and Kunimitsu also appear in the opening sequence, the visible background Tekken Fighters competing in The King of Iron Fist Tournament are King, Armor King, Kuma, Marshall Law, Paul Phoenix and Yoshimitsu.

Tekken 2 cameos

Angel is also the only Tekken 2 character that did not appear in the Motion Picture, even in the intro narration where religious wars were mentioned, there is still no backstory for Angel, causing a continuity error. In addition to this: Alex, Prototype Jack and Roger all have non-dialogue roles during the final battles, their screentime only shows them attacking the other Tekken Fighters.

Tekken 3 cameos

As Tekken 3 had only recently been released to arcades at the time of the film's release, several King of Iron Fist Tournament 3 competitors have appeared in the opening scene but do not appear in any other scenes, such as Ling Xiaoyu, Hwoarang, Eddy Gordo, Forest Law and mainly Jin Kazama (at age 19). Gon also appears as a non-speaking easteregg, Jin appears in the movie's epilogue, but as a child, teasing a sequel.

== Release ==
The first OVA was released in Japan on VHS and LaserDisc on January 21, 1998, with the second part being released on February 21, courtesy of Sony Music Entertainment Japan. A Region 2 DVD release of the OVA was released by SME Visual Works on November 22, 2000.

In South Korea, the June 1998 issue of Game Champ reported that Mujin Video (무진영상) planned to release a Korean-language edition of Tekken during the summer holidays of that year.

ADV Films announced they had licensed the OVA series in May 1998 at Project A-Kon 9. ADV edited both episodes into a single film, featuring a new soundtrack with alternative rock, punk rock and sludge metal music consisting of "The Meaning of Life" by The Offspring, "Save Yourself" by Stabbing Westward, "Clean My Wounds" by Corrosion of Conformity, "Straight to Hell" by The Urge, and "Bonecrusher" by Soulhat.

== Reception ==
Tekken: The Motion Picture was met with mixed reviews, and seen by many as an unsuccessful attempt to replicate the previous success of Street Fighter II: The Animated Movie. Entertainment Weekly called it "a punch-drunk, derivative Saturday-morning cartoon" that "saps every atom of magic from its source." Anime News Network gave the anime a C+, calling it "oddly mediocre in a genre filled with utter crap." Video game magazine Hyper gave it a score of 4/10, opining: "The action bears no resemblance to the games, and the animation is total garbage. The plot is also disturbingly similar to Enter the Dragon. This is one for all anime connoisseurs to avoid." For the English dub, Adam Dudley's performance as Kazuya was also criticized.
