= Anna Williams (Tekken) =

Fictional character

- Tekken character
- First game: Tekken (1994)
- Voiced by: English: Claire Hamilton (Tekken: The Motion Picture); Lenne Hardt (2004–2009); Debra Jean Rogers (Death by Degrees); Tara Platt (2004–present); Japanese: Yumi Tōma (1995–2000); Kaori Yamagata (Tekken: The Motion Picture); Akeno Watanabe (Tekken: Blood Vengeance)
- Portrayed by: Marian Zapico (2009 film)

In-universe information
- Fighting style: Assassination arts
- Origin: Ireland

Anna Williams (Japanese: アンナ・ウィリアムズ) is a character from Bandai Namco's Tekken fighting game series, introduced in the original Tekken in 1994. Anna is an assassin representing Ireland and using Aikido-based martial arts techniques. Story-wise, she is commonly associated with her sister and arch-rival Nina Williams. Anna has been a subject of discussion, frequently linked to Nina in both character and story. Her design and behavior have interested critics. Some saw her role as dependent on Nina, while others spoke of her influence and appeal. Conversations around her have extended into topics like character presentation, inspiration, and fandom.

== Design ==
Anna is an Irish assassin and Aikidoka with a brown bob cut, characterized by a red Qipao. In the 2015 game, Tekken 7, Anna's fiancé was killed by her sister Nina, for which she was shown wearing a mourning dress. In the following game, Tekken 8, Anna's standard design is an uneven bob cut with red-mixed hair, a red fur-lined coat with a lace top, and pants.

Gameplay-wise, Anna shares similarities with Nina. In the first two Tekken games, she was designed as Nina's sub-boss, and had a nearly identical moveset. Since Tekken 3, developers have decided to revamp Anna. Over time, this decision changed Anna into a distinct character, with some traits unique to her, including a bazooka.

=== Motives ===
Anna is known for loving enjoyment, contrasting with Nina's strict attitude, but she is similar to Nina in terms of fighting ability and training as an assassin. Their rivalry began in childhood, mainly due to their father's preference for Nina, whom he trained directly and cared less for Anna; instead, Anna was left to learn Aikido from their mother. This led Anna to develop resentment and focus on improving her skills. Later, when Nina was captured by the organization named Mishima Zaibatsu of the character Kazuya Mishima and put into cryosleep, Anna chose to be a part of the experiment as well.

Onwards, Anna became a special forces member of the G Corporation organization who was ordered to lead an attack on Nina. However, she stopped trying after multiple attempts. Anna then falls in love with her fellow G Corporation soldier, and secretly a mafia boss, planning to get married. But on their wedding day, Anna observes that her wedding dress is stolen and hears gunshots; Anna sees that her groom is killed, with Nina running away in her wedding dress. Anna later discovered that her fiancé had bad intentions, and Nina acquired her position at G Corporation. Anna continues to seek revenge, collaborating with a weapon specialist, Dr. Nakamura, who gave her a close-packed weapon called "Lovely Tom"; she also altered her fighting style.

== Appearances ==
Anna is a mainstay of the Tekken series, appearing as a playable character in every main entry, except Tekken 4. She also appeared in spin-offs like Tekken Tag Tournament, Tekken Card Challenge, Death by Degrees, Tekken 3D: Prime Edition, Tekken Tag Tournament 2, and Tekken Revolution. In other media, Anna is featured in the 1998 anime adaptation Tekken: The Motion Picture and the 2011 animated film Tekken: Blood Vengeance and was portrayed by Marian Zapico in the 2009 film.

In English, Anna was voiced by Claire Hamilton for Tekken: The Motion Picture, Lenne Hardt from 2004 to 2009, Debra Jean Rogers for Death by Degrees, and Tara Platt since 2004. In Japanese, Anna was voiced by Yumi Tōma from 1995 to 2000, Kaori Yamagata for Tekken: The Motion Picture, and Akeno Watanabe for Tekken: Blood Vengeance.

== Critical reception ==
In June 2017, Gavin Jasper from the Den of Geek website compared Anna with Nina, defining them as inseparable, saying that it is difficult to talk about one without mentioning the other. He says that while Nina is more serious and focused on her work, Anna is more expressive and often acts in ways to tease her sister; another point he argued is that while Anna helps make Nina more absorbing, Anna is basically non-existent without the help of Nina. Decisively, he favored Anna, reasoning that she is superior to Nina in nearly every personality-related aspect.

Anna's design has been viewed as an inspiration for a third-party video game character. A case centered on this happened in October 2024, covered by Catherine Lewis of the GamesRadar+ website, involving Silent Hill 2 artist Masahiro Ito, who responded to fans and their observations of sensing a resemblance between Anna and a character model called Fukuro Lady. The character's red dress, high heels, and bob hairstyle led some to visualize that she was inspired by Anna. Ito acknowledged the similarity, stating that fans might be correct from their perspective to see the resemblance, but clarified that the actual inspiration came from a photograph in a BDSM magazine. Additional influence is attributed to Uma Thurman from Pulp Fiction.

In the LGBTQ Pride Month of 2025, Jason Okundaye, a journalist from The Guardian newspaper, discussed the LGBTQ+ community's attraction to Anna and her role. He described the rivalry between Anna and Nina as filled with exaggerated scenes, which he classified as "high camp" and "classic drama". Despite the rivalry, Okundaye viewed Anna as someone who still seeks admiration from her incurious sister, a scenario that he related to as a queer person. He conveys that Anna's return in Tekken 8 was especially celebrated by queer players. Okundaye thought that while the series does not seem fully aware of its LGBTQ+ fanbase, there are signs of its rise. In one Anna-related video, game designer Michael Murray revealed Anna's popularity among LGBTQ+ players, and game producer Katsuhiro Harada mentioned her strong following among lesbians. Anna's appeal, according to Okundaye, lies in her natural charisma.

=== Tekken community response ===
In Tekken 8, Anna went viral controversially for her design among the Tekken community

In July 2024, gaming website IGN's Isaiah Colbert reported that Anna has been viewed as inferior to Nina by the Tekken community, blaming the series' developers for always giving Nina more attention and importance. This results from depictions in which Nina dominates Anna in multiple storytelling interactions across the series. The perception is amplified by Nina's consistent presence in the series, whereas Anna appears less frequently. Harada called this an illusion, explaining that he is always thoughtful of Anna, admitting that while Nina is more popular, he always tried to make sure Anna's glamour connected with players, and mentioning the effort he put into Anna to make her special from Nina.

In February 2025, Harada responded to mixed reactions over Anna's Tekken 8 look. For some longtime fans who prefer her classic look, Harada advised them to play the older games instead. He revealed that the overall fanbase approved the new design and suggested that vocal critics did not represent the majority. Harada found it difficult to please everyone, pointing out that fans previously complained about her absence from the game and now her appearance. He added that reusing her old design might have been deemed unoriginal, and while he appreciates positive feedback, he engages more with negative comments to keep the community respectful. This news was reported by gaming journalists such as Carlos "Zoto" Zotomayor (AUTOMATION WEST), Ed Nightingale (Eurogamer), and Vikki Blake (IGN). Four months later, another point of criticism was covered by AUTOMATION WEST involving Anna's Tekken 8 gameplay, following a match in which Anna's expert Atif Butt won by exploiting game mechanics, which circulated online, upsetting the community.
