= Jack Dale (ice hockey) =

American ice hockey player (1945–2026)

- Born: December 19, 1945 Saint Paul, Minnesota, U.S.
- Died: September 16, 2026 (aged 80) Saint Paul, Minnesota, U.S.
- Height: 5 ft 9 in (175 cm)
- Weight: 180 lb (82 kg; 12 st 12 lb)
- Position: Left wing
- Shot: Left
- National team: United States
- Playing career: 1965–1971

John Byron Dale (December 19, 1945 – September 16, 2026) was an American ice hockey center and Olympian.

== Biography ==
Dale played with Team USA at the 1968 Winter Olympics held in Grenoble, France. He previously played for the Eastern Hockey League's Johnstown Jets as well as the University of Minnesota Golden Gophers men's ice hockey team.

He was married to his wife, Olga, for 54 years. They had five children, including actor Ian Anthony Dale (born 1978). Dale died at his home in Saint Paul, Minnesota, on September 16, 2026, at the age of 80.
