= Tekken (2009 film) =

Science fiction martial arts film

- Japanese theatrical release poster
- Directed by: Dwight Little
- Screenplay by: Alan B. McElroy
- Based on: Tekken by Namco / Bandai Games, Inc.
- Produced by: Benedict Carver; Steven Paul
- Starring: Jon Foo; Kelly Overton; Cary-Hiroyuki Tagawa; Ian Anthony Dale; Cung Le; Darrin Dewitt Henson; Candice Hillebrand; Luke Goss
- Cinematography: Brian J. Reynolds
- Edited by: David Checel
- Music by: John Hunter
- Production company: Crystal Sky Pictures
- Distributed by: Anchor Bay Entertainment
- Release dates: November 5, 2009 (American Film Market); July 19, 2011 (United States)
- Running time: 87 minutes
- Country: United States
- Language: English
- Budget: $30 million
- Box office: $1.6 million

Tekken (Note: Subtitled with Hegemony) is a 2009 American science fiction martial arts film loosely based on the video game series of the same name developed and published by Namco / Bandai Games, Inc. It was directed by Dwight Little from a screenplay by Alan B. McElroy. The film stars Jon Foo, Kelly Overton, Cary-Hiroyuki Tagawa, Ian Anthony Dale, Cung Le, Darrin Dewitt Henson, Candice Hillebrand, and Luke Goss. The plot follows Jin Kazama in his attempts to enter the Iron Fist Tournament in order to avenge the loss of his mother, Jun Kazama, by confronting the forces of the city that are also holding the competition.

The film was originally announced by publisher Namco / Bandai in 2002, but did not start development until 2007. Experienced in sports movies, Little decided to make Tekken focused on realism, resulting in the removal of supernatural elements from the video game series as well as comic relief characters. This also led to the inclusion of martial artists as the main cast to produce well-choreographed battles.

Tekken premiered at the American Film Market on November 5, 2009, and was released direct-to-video in the United States on July 19, 2011, by Anchor Bay Entertainment. The film bombed at the box office with a gross of $1.6 million worldwide. Critical reception was unfavorable, with the film generally praised for its fighting scenes, but criticized for its unfaithful narrative and poor acting within the main cast. The criticism also came from the video game series' executive director Katsuhiro Harada. Nevertheless, Tekken spawned the 2014 prequel Tekken 2: Kazuya's Revenge.

== Plot ==
After World War III (or the Terror Wars), governments dissolved. Megacorporations took over and fought for control until eight survived and divided their territories, with North America falling under the control of the strongest company - the Tekken Corporation. In order to maintain peace and power, the corporations began hosting an annual fighting tournament known as "Iron Fist" (named after the corporations' collective name). Representatives from each corporation battle until one is left standing and receives not only stardom and wealth for themselves, but also global glory and honor for their respective corporation.

In the year 2039, Jin Kazama lives with his mother, Jun, in the Anvil, a slum area surrounding Tekken City. Jun raised and trained Jin by herself, never speaking of his father, claiming him to be dead. A rebellious young man, Jin makes money as a contraband runner for resistance groups that fight against the corrupt Tekken Corporation, much to Jun's disapproval. Jin wishes to enter the Iron Fist tournament in order to provide a better income, but Jun forbids it, claiming that what the tournament represents was the very thing that ignited the Terror Wars.

One night, after a run, Jin is targeted by the Jackhammers, the elite specs group that patrols the Anvil and ensures the safety of Tekken City, resulting in Jun's death. Devastated, Jin swears revenge against Heihachi Mishima, chairman of the Tekken Corporation. In the ruins of his former home, Jin finds a Tekken Fighter I.D. belonging to Jun, revealing she was once an Iron Fist fighter. After winning a wild card berth in Iron Fist by defeating the disgraced Marshall Law, Jin goes to Tekken City, sponsored by former boxer Steve Fox.

Upon entering Tekken City, Jin befriends mixed martial artist Christie Monteiro. He wins his first match against Miguel Caballero Rojo, nearly killing him in a fit of rage. Heihachi's son, Kazuya Mishima, is impressed and offers Jin a place in Tekken Corporation, but Jin refuses. Later that night, Jin is attacked by Nina and Anna Williams, at Kazuya's request. Jin survives the assassination attempt, thanks to Christie's interference. Jin vows to win Iron Fist and to kill both Heihachi and Kazuya. When he gives Steve Jun's ID, he realizes he is her son, telling him that he knew her. During the quarterfinals, Christie defeats Nina.

Kazuya then has Heihachi imprisoned, effectively seizing control of Tekken. Jin narrowly defeats the elite swordsman Yoshimitsu. Jin, Christie, and Steve try to escape, along with Raven, leaving Nina, Anna, and Sergei Dragunov behind. Kazuya brings down some guards, causing a firefight. Steve, Christie, and Raven cover Jin but he walks across Heihachi's cell. Angry, Jin tries to taunt Heihachi, saying he is responsible for killing Jin's mother. However, since Heihachi is their only mean of escaping Tekken, Steve frees Heihachi and joins the group. In the gunfight, Raven is wounded and recaptured.

Fleeing to the Anvil, the group take shelter in an abandoned warehouse. Heihachi explains to Jin that the Tekken Corporation's true purpose is to restore order to the world. He also reveals that Kazuya raped his mother, making him Jin's father, and left her for dead. Heihachi took her out of Tekken City to the Anvil to keep her alive. Eventually, the group is located by Jackhammers, who kill Steve in a firefight and recapture the rest of the escapees. Before taking them back to Iron Fist, Kazuya orders the Jackhammers to execute Heihachi.

Back in Tekken City, Kazuya changes the rules of the tournament and now wants the fighters to fight to the death. In the Finals, Jin is forced to fight against Bryan Fury, who had already defeated and killed Dragunov, while Kazuya holds Christie hostage in the control room. At first, he is outmatched, but remembering his mother's teachings, Jin defeats Bryan to the elation of the audiences in the stadium, and in the Anvil. Infuriated by Jin's victory, Kazuya enters the tournament himself armed with two moon axes. The weaponless Jin is saved, thanks to a distraction by Christie, and pins Kazuya, who baits Jin by claiming that he remembers how Jun "put up quite a fight". Jin defeats Kazuya but refuses to kill his father.

Jin walks out of Tekken City's gate and is saluted by the Jackhammers, symbolizing his new role as CEO of Tekken Corporation and returns home to the Anvil, to a hero's welcome. In a post-credits scene, it is revealed that Heihachi survived his execution, with his captor Jackhammer standing down when ordered to do so.

== Cast ==
The cast of the movie includes:

- Jon Foo as Jin Kazama
  - Jason Del Rosario as Young Jin Kazama
  - Dallas James Liu as Jin Kazama (age 6)
- Kelly Overton as Christie Monteiro
- Cary-Hiroyuki Tagawa as Heihachi Mishima
- Ian Anthony Dale as Kazuya Mishima
- Cung Le as Marshall Law
- Darrin Dewitt Henson as Raven
- Luke Goss as Steve Fox
- Tamlyn Tomita as Jun Kazama
- Candice Hillebrand as Nina Williams
- Marian Zapico as Anna Williams
- Gary Daniels as Bryan Fury
- Gary Ray Stearns as Yoshimitsu
- Roger Huerta as Miguel Rojo
- Lateef Crowder as Eddy Gordo
- Anton Kasabov as Sergei Dragunov
- Mircea Monroe as Kara
- John Pyper Ferguson as Bonner
- Kiko Ellsworth as Denslow
- Blake Shields as Hansu
- Jason Richter as Bonner's Associate

== Production ==
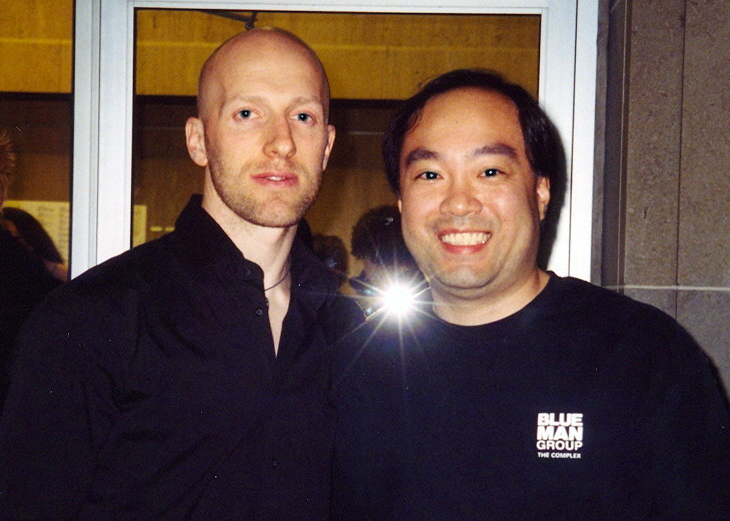
In order to portray a sense of realism, Cyril Raffaelli (left) was cast as the main fight choreographer.

Talks about making Tekken into a movie have been underway since June 2002 with Namco Bandai Games stating production would start in 2003. The film was meant to be released in 2005. It was reported that the production company, Crystal Sky Pictures, had acquired the film rights for $60 million. After several years of hiatus, the project resurfaced after a teaser poster appeared on the web in October 2008. This was mostly due to the global success of Lara Croft: Tomb Raider as well as the long-lasting popularity of the Tekken franchise. Originally, Charles Stone III was going to be film's director who teased in 2004 it would different from other adaptations like Mortal Kombat or Tomb Raider; He claimed the narrative would heavily focus on the characters to provoke a more dramatic style. He aimed to get famous actors like Jackie Chan and Jet Li believing the budget would be enough to get such skilled actors. The production of the movie was set to start during 2005. However, the project saw a major change in staff members. Stone was investigating K-1 during the making of the movie while taking notes from Enter the Dragon (1973) with the objective of the making the final product both accessible and realistic. In 2007, Dwight H. Little signed to become the film's new director.

The film originated from the next director's experience with martial arts-based films including Marked for Death (1990) and Rapid Fire (1992); Dwight H. Little was called by the producer to direct another martial arts movie, Tekken, a franchise he was only familiar with due to his two children having played the games. Little requested help from writer Alan B. McElroy, who had done Halloween 4: The Return of Michael Myers and Rapid Fire while doing research for the movie. The director and writer agreed to remove the supernatural elements from the game for the film, most notably Jin Kazama's devil mutation as well as campy elements from the franchise, including animal fighters. They wanted to focus more on the sports-like story like Rocky which is associated with family bonds as well as multiple cultures. The characters used in the narrative were chosen since they came across as the most realistic ones in contrast to the supernatural Devil Jin, whom they felt was more fitting for an anime film. Luke Goss said that the team intended to make the film R rated.

The main stuntman was Cyril Raffaelli who revealed the movie has a total of 9 fights with each containing nearly 50 moves. The film finished shooting in May 2009. In order to bring more realism to the fights, the team used real fighters including Lateef Crowder, Roger Huerta and Cung Le. In order to have more supporting fighters, the team also got Gary Daniels, which necessitated the main character being played by a real fighter rather than using two actors for his stunts. Finding Jon Foo as Jin proved to be a difficult task due to how they needed somebody who was young, skilled, and handsome. They met the actor in Thailand. Other actors include Cary-Hiroyuki Tagawa, whom they found fitting for Heihachi Mishima, as well as the skilled Ian Anthony Dale.

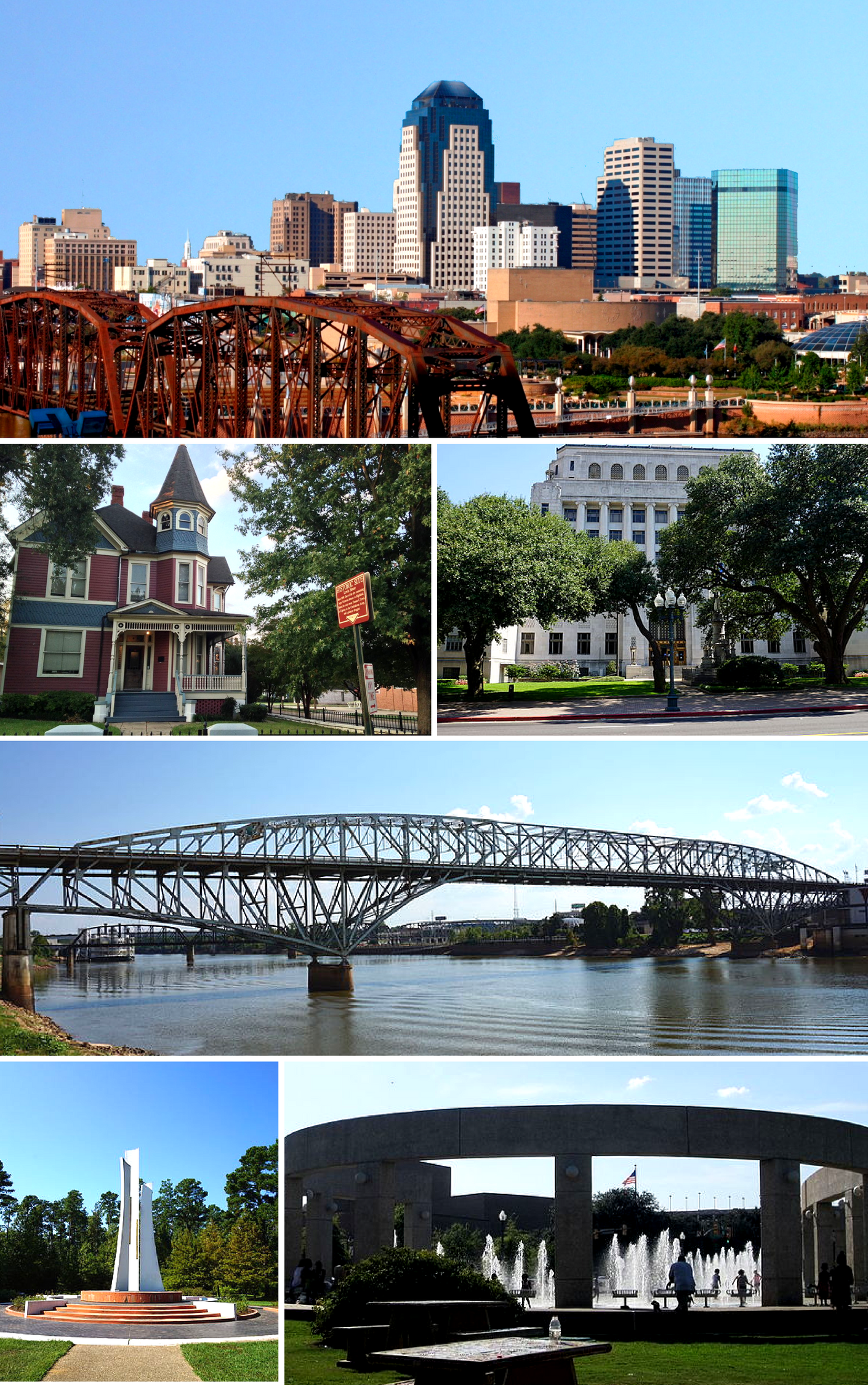
The film was shot in Shreveport, Louisiana

Little attempted to cast Danielle Harris based on her experience with Marked For Death but she did not appear. Nevertheless, he was surprised by Gary Daniels's performance as Brian Fury. Though the narrative appears to explore political events due to how the Tekken tournament has changed the world, there were no intentions to provide such context. Instead, the main conflict of the story involves Jin Kazama's relationship with his family, most notably the villain, Kazuya Mishima. While the film does not offer a proper closure to the family struggle, Little claimed they added scenes about him and Heihachi to provide content for a sequel, should it be approved. Though Jin has two love interests in the movie, Little claims the first one Jin has never becomes serious, citing the character's young age as the cause. Little describes the film's story as that of a rebel who wishes to give freedom to his people following their restricted lives in their hometown.

As a self-proclaimed fan of the Tekken series, Jon Foo felt honored to play Jin's character in the live-action film. Still, he found it difficult to play Jin as he spent three months on a diet in order to do the fighting moves for the film. In recording for the movie, he traveled to Thailand to do a screen test. He also flew to America to do another screen test. Foo was glad he was chosen for the role of Jin because it was his first time playing a lead role. Among several scenes, Foo chose Jin's and Brian's battle as his favorite.

The team originally wanted to shoot in Europe but ended up in North America for easier access to arenas. They shot in Shreveport, Louisiana, because they had built a new public arena down the road. While the team used CGI visuals for the arenas, they also used real buildings and crowds that viewed the battles, which was especially helpful since they did not have a big budget. In regards to battles, the staff aimed to make homages to the video games with Little specifying the faithful recreation of Eddy Gordo's moves. They compared the fighting styles they used with Gladiator (2000) when dealing with the Yoshimitsu and Jin fight.

== Release ==
The film was screened at the Mann's Criterion Theatre in Santa Monica on November 5, 2009, as part of the American Film Market to find a solid distributor. It was released in Japan on March 20, 2010, by Warner Bros. Pictures. The film also premiered on July 27, 2010, in Singapore and August 4 in the Philippines (via Pioneer Films). One week before the Philippine premiere, Jon Foo visited Manila to promote the film. Due to its poor reception, the film never saw a wide theatrical release in the United States, and was released direct-to-video instead. Little explained, "we had a theatrical distributor, and we had a deal for theatrical, and, just because of the new economic times and the way business is done with DVD, that company went out of business. Then we were left as orphans and Anchor Bay made the release", which the director found helpful.

The film was released on DVD and Blu-ray Disc in Japan on August 11, 2010. In the United Kingdom, Optimum released and distributed the film on May 2, 2011. Anchor Bay Entertainment released the film in the United States on DVD and Blu-ray Disc on July 19, 2011.

== Reception ==
Tekken: Hegemony boasts a critical score of 0%, based on 6 reviews, and has a 31% approval rating by audiences on Rotten Tomatoes with an average rating of 2.68/10.

Brian Orndorf of DVD Talk gave the film two stars out of five, writing: "Tekken is a failure on many levels, but it does make a plucky attempt to replicate the flippy-floppy nature of the fighting elements, creating a limb-snapping effort of escapism surrounded by bland writing and sleepy performances". He opined that director Dwight H. Little "show[s] off an impressive spectrum of fighting styles and intensity, though he goes a little crazy with trendy cinematographic choices and hyperactive editing". Rating it "Guilty", DVD Verdict enjoyed how faithful most of the character's designs were to the games but aimed criticism towards battles which employed weaponry. He also felt that the protagonist's quest to seek revenge lacked focus. Martial Arts Action Movies claimed that while the film seems universally hated due to how unfaithful is to the source material and "bland" storyline, he still liked it thanks to the visuals and fight choreography. Roobia said that most of the budget went to the visuals as he felt that the cast showed poor performances but still found it accessible to all audiences.

Critics enjoyed Jon Foo's appearance but criticized some aspects of Jin's portrayal. BeyondHollywood thought Jon Foo's appearance might appeal to viewers based on his similarities with Jin. Rating it B, The Fandom Post disliked Jin's shoehorned love-interests, including a white-washed Christie Monteiro, as well as the lack of focus on fights prior to the finals in the Iron Fist Tournament. Nevertheless, the writer felt the film was enjoyable. DVD Verdict criticized how Jin lacked most of his important traits, most notably his Devil Gene. Although Martial Arts and Action Movies criticized Foo's acting, calling it "emotionless", his fight sequences were praised. Roobla also praised the fight sequences, most notably Jin's fight against Eddy.

Paul Pritchard of DVD Verdict compared Tekken to other video game film adaptations: "In the grand scheme of things, Tekken bests both Street Fighter: The Ultimate Battle (1994) and Street Fighter: The Legend of Chun-Li (2009) movies with ease, but lacks the goofy charms of Mortal Kombat. Had it embraced its roots more openly, the film may well have offered more excitement. As it is, Tekken is just an average action flick, with nothing to distinguish it from the rest of the crowd". MovieHole was also negative, attributing the lack theatrical release in North America to distributors realizing that viewers would not waste money on it. They also compared it to Uwe Boll's movies, but still noted the appeal of its fighting scenes.

=== Response by Katsuhiro Harada ===
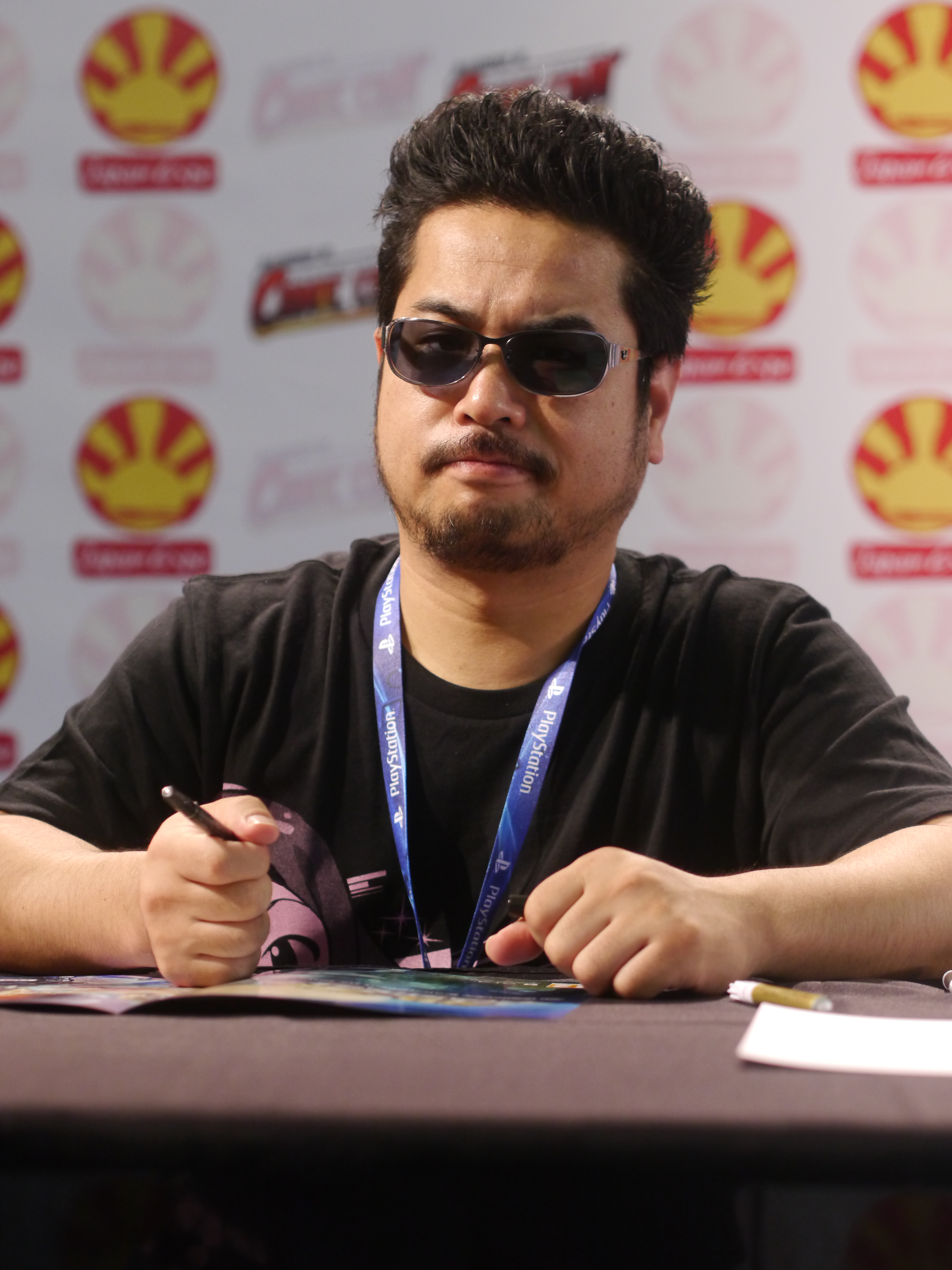
Tekken game director Katsuhiro Harada expressed his disapproval of the film.

Katsuhiro Harada, director of the Tekken video game series, criticized the film: "That Hollywood movie is terrible. We were not able to supervise that movie; it was a cruel contract. I'm not interested in that movie". Reacting to Harada's comments, Nick Chester of Destructoid said the film is "not great, but 'terrible' is a stretch", saying that it "does a decent job of trying to stay true to the look and feel of the [games]" and that "the fight scenes weren't bad".

When the CGI film Tekken: Blood Vengeance (2011) was announced, Harada said that he wanted to stop people from remembering the live-action film and instead focus on the CGI one as it would be more faithful to the franchise. However, he also said "That doesn't have anything to do with it this time," Harada insisted. "We're not trying to rewrite those wrongs. Fans are always asking us for a 3D movie. This is our response to them... We want to make a movie that everyone can enjoy, though. Not just Tekken fans."

== Prequel ==
Crystal Sky Pictures later produced a prequel to Tekken, named Tekken 2: Kazuya's Revenge, directed by Wych Kaos and starring Kane Kosugi. The film was released on August 6, 2014, and focuses on Kazuya Mishima's story years before the film's beginning.

== See also ==
- List of films based on video games
