= Ian Anthony Dale =

American actor

- Occupations: Actor, director
- Years active: 2002–present
- Spouse: Nicole Garippo (m. 2016)
- Children: 2

Ian Anthony Dale is an American actor. His notable roles include Adam Noshimuri on Hawaii Five-0, Harris Edwards on Salvation, Simon Lee on The Event, Davis Lee on Surface, Avatar Gamma on Charmed and Kazuya Mishima in Tekken. He has also appeared on shows such as Las Vegas, JAG, Day Break, CSI: Crime Scene Investigation, Criminal Minds, 24, and The Walking Dead and The Resident

== Early life ==
Growing up in Saint Paul, Minnesota, Dale attended Cretin-Derham Hall High School where he was a standout baseball player and also first discovered acting. His father Jack Dale played ice hockey for the Minnesota Golden Gophers and made the national team for the 1968 Winter Olympics. His mother is Japanese who immigrated from Kobe to the United States as a teenager.

Dale attended St. Mary's University in Winona, Minnesota, where he studied stage and theatre and then moved to Madison, Wisconsin, graduating from the University of Wisconsin–Madison. During his first several years in Los Angeles, he worked as a carpenter building sets to make ends meet while taking acting classes and auditioning for roles.

== Career ==
=== Film ===
In 2004, Dale appeared in the film Mr. 3000 as "Fukuda", alongside Bernie Mac, Angela Bassett and Chris Noth. His next movie role was in 2007's The Bucket List as an instructor to Jack Nicholson and Morgan Freeman's characters in one of the scenes. In 2009, he followed that up with a minor part in The Hangover, appeared in the independent film Lollipops and starred in Tekken as Kazuya Mishima. In 2010, he appeared in the film Flying Lessons. In 2010, he also portrayed Scorpion in the short film of Mortal Kombat: Rebirth on YouTube. The film paved way for a web series, Mortal Kombat: Legacy, in which Dale reprised his role. He reprised his role in the second season.

=== Television ===
Dale had his first television break on a 2002 episode of Fastlane. Since then he has appeared in episodes of Angel, JAG, Las Vegas, Charmed, 24, CSI: Crime Scene Investigation, Criminal Minds, Dollhouse and Cold Case.

Major television roles have included recurring character Davis Lee on Surface and Detective Christopher Choi on Day Break. Both series were only broadcast for one season and did not return for a second. Dale was a series regular in the NBC drama series The Event, which ran in the fall of 2010.

==== Hawaii Five-0, Murder in the First and Salvation ====
Beginning in 2011 with the second season, Dale portrayed the recurring role of Adam Noshimuri in the 2010 remake of Hawaii Five-O. The character was first introduced as the head of the Yakuza, later becoming a police officer; and current boyfriend, later husband, of Kono Kalakaua, who was portrayed by series regular Grace Park. Following Park's departure from the series, Dale was promoted to the main cast beginning with the eighth season, a role which he held until the series concluded with its tenth season in 2020. Dale also directed an episode of the series during its final season, and later crossed over to the 2018 reboot of Magnum, P.I. during its second season.

During his time on Hawaii Five-0 Dale was also cast in series regular roles on Murder in the First as Jim Koto and in Salvation, to portray Harris Edwards. Both roles were held for the entirety of both series run; three seasons from 2014–2016 and two seasons from 2017–2018, respectively. Other roles during this time included guest stints on The Mentalist and American Horror Story: Coven, two-episode story arcs on Emily Owens, M.D. and Hart of Dixie, and the unsold television adaptation of Delirium.

==== Post Hawaii Five-0 ====
Following Hawaii Five-0 Dale had a brief recurring role as Louis Bravo on the American legal drama All Rise, and was cast to portray Tomi, Yumiko's long lost brother in the eleventh and final season of The Walking Dead. In November 2022 Dale was cast to play Dr. James Yamada on The Resident.

In May 2024, Dale was cast to play Sean Harimoto on Fox series Rescue: HI-Surf.

== Filmography ==
=== Film ===
Year	Title	Role	Notes
2004	Mr. 3000	Fukuda	
2007	The Bucket List	Instructor	
2009	The Hangover	Chow's #1	
2009	Tekken	Kazuya Mishima	
2009	Flying Lessons	Lance	
2010	Mortal Kombat: Rebirth	Hanzo Hasashi / Scorpion	
2016	XOXO	Anders	
2017	Wakefield	Ben Jacobs	

=== Television ===
Year	Title	Role	Notes
2002	Fastlane	Jackson Yu	Episode: "Mighty Blue"
2003	Angel	Drugged Vampire #3	Episode: "Release"
2003	JAG	Lance Corporal Brad Owens	Episode: "The Boast"
2004	Las Vegas	Jonathan Tam	Episode: "Die Fast, Die Furious"
2004	Hawaii	Lieutenant Robertson	Episode: "No Man Is an Island"
2004	Second Time Around	Sam Chang	Episode: "No, No"
2004	Charmed	Avatar Gamma	5 episodes
2005	North Shore	Garrett Haynes	Episode: "The End"
2005–2006	Surface	Davis Lee	Main role
2006–2007	Day Break	Detective Christopher Choi	Main role
2006–2009	Criminal Minds	Lt. Detective Owen Kim	2 episodes
2007	Without a Trace	David Kwon	Episode: "Without You"
2007	Bones	Commander James Adams	Episode: "Spaceman in a Crater"
2007	24	Zhou Yong	2 episodes
2007	Cold Case	Ray Takahashi	Episode: "Family 8108"
2009	CSI: NY	Ellis Park	Episode: "The Past, Present and Murder"
2009	Dollhouse	Jack Dunston	Episode: "Haunted"
2009	CSI: Miami	Evan Wilcox	Episode: "Kill Clause"
2010	Trauma	Andy Wu	Episode: "Protocol"
2010	CSI: Crime Scene Investigation	Lon Rose	Episode: "The Panty Sniffer"
2010–2011	The Event	Agent Simon Lee	Main role
2011	Burn Notice	Xavier	Episode: "Damned If You Do"
2011–2020	Hawaii Five-0	Adam Noshimuri	Recurring role (seasons 2–7)
2011–2020	Hawaii Five-0	Adam Noshimuri	Main role (seasons 8–10) and director; 1 episode
2012	The Mentalist	Nathaniel Kim	Episode: "Red Dawn"
2012	Emily Owens, M.D.	Dr. Kyle Putnam	2 episodes
2013	American Horror Story: Coven	Dr. David Zhong	Episode: "Bitchcraft"
2014	Delirium	Liam	Unsold TV pilot
2014–2016	Murder in the First	Jim Koto	Main role
2015	Hart of Dixie	Henry Dalton	2 episodes
2017–2018	Salvation	Harris Edwards	Main role
2020	Magnum P.I.	Adam Noshimuri	Episode: "A Leopard on the Prowl"
2021–2022	The Walking Dead	Tomi	Recurring role (season 11); 7 episodes
2021–2023	All Rise	DA Louis Bravo	Recurring role (seasons 2–3); 16 episodes
2022	The Resident	Dr. James Yamada	Season 6
2023	Accused	Jiro Tamura	Episode: "Jiro's Story"
2024–2025	Rescue: HI-Surf	Sean Harimoto	Recurring role; 5 episodes

=== Web ===
Year	Title	Role	Notes
2011–2013	Mortal Kombat: Legacy	Hanzo Hasashi / Scorpion	5 episodes

=== Video games ===
Year	Title	Role	Notes
2012	Sleeping Dogs	Ricky Wong	
2012	Call of Duty: Black Ops II	Multiplayer Voices	
2015	Battlefield Hardline	Marvin The Thief	
2024	Like a Dragon: Infinite Wealth	Jo Sawashiro	
2026	Romeo Is a Dead Man	SilverSox	

== Directing credits ==
Year	Title	Notes
2020	Hawaii Five-0	Episode: "He waha kou o ka he'e"
