= Tekken 4 =

2001 video game

- Developer: Namco
- Publishers: Namco; PlayStation 2: NA: Namco Hometek; EU: Sony Computer Entertainment
- Directors: Katsuhiro Harada; Masahiro Kimoto; Yuichi Yonemori
- Producer: Hajime Nakatani
- Programmers: Yoshihito Saito; Junichi Sakai; Kenji Ozaki
- Artists: Yoshinari Mizushima; Takuji Kawano
- Writers: Kazuaki Fujimoto; Yoshinari Mizushima; Shinsuke Sato
- Composers: Akitaka Tohyama; Yuu Miyake; Satoru Kōsaki; Hiroshi Okubo; Keiki Kobayashi
- Series: Tekken
- Platforms: Arcade, PlayStation 2
- Release: Arcade: JP: August 1, 2001; NA: August 21, 2001; PlayStation 2: JP: March 28, 2002; EU: September 13, 2002; NA: September 23, 2002
- Genres: Fighting, beat 'em up
- Modes: Single-player, multiplayer
- Arcade system: Namco System 246

Tekken 4 (鉄拳4) is a 2001 fighting game developed and published by Namco for arcades. Initially released for Namco's System 246 hardware, it was then ported to the PlayStation 2 home console in 2002. As the fourth main installment in the Tekken series following Tekken 3 (1997), and the fifth overall following the non-canon title Tekken Tag Tournament (1999), the game harbored many gameplay revisions, such as the series-unique ability for the player to move about before the round begins and the introduction of walled stages.

There are up to twenty-two playable characters, five of which are newcomers and one alter-ego palette swap. Placing distinction on the plot in the console version, the tone of Tekken 4 was noticeably darker than other installments in the series. The game notably features the canonical return of Kazuya Mishima, whose story reveals that he was revived following his death 20 years prior and has entered the King of Iron Fist Tournament 4 to take back the Mishima Zaibatsu from his father Heihachi Mishima and seek out his son Jin Kazama.

Tekken 4 received generally favorable reviews. The reception from established veteran arcade players compared to casual console players in the gaming community was initially mixed, with such competitive players pointing out to its traditional gameplay replaced by realism through uneven floors and walls in actual vicinities, as well as more lateral 3D movement replacing aerial combat and juggling. There is also more aggression and poking, akin to boxing or fencing. However, there has been a revival in its reception becoming more positive for its innovative art design and sound. Meanwhile, critics and publications including IGN have rated it as one of the best games in the series. A sequel, Tekken 5, was released in 2004.

== Gameplay ==
Gameplay screenshot depicting Nina vs. Paul

Tekken 4 introduces significant gameplay changes from the previous games in the series, finally going for realism and a leap into full 3D immersion. It adds significantly more gameplay features and modes than its predecessor, Tekken Tag Tournament. For the first time, it allows players to maneuver around an arena interacting with walls and other obstacles for extra damage. These "environmental hazards" in turn allow players to juggle opponents for consecutive combos and allow the designers to implement a "switch maneuver", which lets players escape from cornering and turn the tide in their favor. The game engine has been tweaked to be more focused on the environment, causing the characters to move more slowly and fluidly than in Tekken Tag Tournament. The balance is also better than in Tekken Tag Tournament. Finally, the game introduces a brand new graphics system, which features increased lighting, dynamic physics, and smoother surfaces. The game also introduces the new universal concept of just frame inputs that require an input on exactly one frame, and may be unblockable or have special properties, as symbolized by blue sparks. Examples include the Demolition Man or Demo Man of Paul Phoenix, and the Naraka Sweep of Heihachi Mishima.

The console version of Tekken 4 includes a beat 'em up minigame available from the outset, called Tekken Force. Similar to the previous minigame found in Tekken 3, it presents the player with an over-the-shoulder perspective as they fight wave upon wave of Heihachi's Tekken Force through four stages, facing Combot, then Kuma, then Kazuya, and eventually facing Heihachi himself, with his clothing changing if Heihachi is selected to fight himself. The player can pick up health and power-ups while fighting waves of enemies. In the minigame, it is discovered that the Tekken Force possesses different ranks in the organization, evident in different amounts of stamina, strength, and skill. A new Story mode in the home version unlocks cutscenes when played, in contrast to previous installments in which such cutscenes were unlocked from playing the Arcade mode. The modern practice mode also developed in Tekken 4, with life bars as well as the near full move list now available in practice. There are also new modes such as pure defensive training to diversify the practice mode and make it more accessible to newcomers. The game also features the usual combos and hack tips to unlock certain win pose animations, which are completely different and had not been changed since the first game.

== Characters ==
The arcade version features a total of 20 characters, consisting of 16 returning and 4 new ones, including the Irish-English boxer Steve Fox who is revealed to be the son of Nina Williams. The returning characters include some who did not make the cut in the 19-year time skip between Tekken 2 and Tekken 3. The console version adds two characters (one returning and one new) making 22 characters in all, given that both additions are palette swaps of existing ones. Ten characters are available by default, with the rest being unlocked by clearing Story Mode multiple times.

=== New characters ===
- Christie Monteiro: A Capoeira student in search for her friend and teacher, Eddy Gordo.
- Combot ^{a}: A general purpose robot created by the Violet Systems who is able to mimic other characters' fighting styles.
- Craig Marduk: An undefeated Vale Tudo fighter who had killed Armor King and is joining the tournament under the lure of Armor King's student King II
- Miharu Hirano ^{a} ^{b} ^{c}: The best friend of Ling Xiaoyu.
- Steve Fox: A young boxing champion who seeks to find out about his past.
- Violet ^{a} ^{c} ^{d}: The alter-ego of Lee Chaolan. Although introduced as a mysterious new fighter, Violet shares the same ending revealing himself as Lee before facing Combot as the final boss, and is essentially considered as one character and not a distinct character.

=== Returning characters ===
- Bryan Fury ^{a}
- Eddy Gordo ^{a} ^{b} ^{c}
- Heihachi Mishima ^{a}
- Hwoarang
- Jin Kazama ^{a}
- Julia Chang ^{a}
- Kazuya Mishima
- King II
- Kuma II ^{a}
- Lee Chaolan ^{a}
- Lei Wulong ^{a}
- Ling Xiaoyu
- Marshall Law
- Nina Williams ^{a}
- Panda ^{a} ^{c}
- Paul Phoenix
- Yoshimitsu

^a Unlockable character
^b Only playable in console version (makes a cameo appearances in arcade version)
^c Skin/palette swap
^d Skin/palette swap when Lee Chaolan unlocked

== Plot ==
Two years after the King of Iron Fist Tournament 3, Heihachi Mishima and his scientists have captured samples of Ogre's blood and tissue to splice with Heihachi's genome, to make him immortal. The experiment fails since Heihachi lacks the necessary Devil gene. His grandson, Jin Kazama, possesses the Devil gene but has been missing since the previous tournament. Meanwhile, Heihachi learns that the body of his son, Kazuya Mishima, who also had the Devil gene and whom Heihachi killed by throwing into a volcano 21 years ago, is in storage in the labs of the G Corporation, a cutting-edge biotech firm and the Mishima Zaibatsu's sole corporate rival. Heihachi sends his Tekken Forces to raid the G Corporation facility to retrieve Kazuya's body. Still, the mission fails when the forces are wiped out by Kazuya himself, who was secretly restored to life a few days after his death and kept hidden from the world since. Unknown to Heihachi, Jin has been in a self-imposed training exile in Brisbane, to unlearn the Mishima karate style and master traditional karate, loathing anything to do with his bloodline since Heihachi's betrayal.

To lure Kazuya and Jin out, Heihachi announces the King of Iron Fist Tournament 4, with the ownership of the Mishima Zaibatsu being the top prize. At the 7th stage, where Kazuya and Jin are poised to fight one another, Jin fails to appear, having been ambushed and captured by the Tekken Forces, and Kazuya is declared the winner by default, though he suspects his son has been abducted. He faces Heihachi in the final round and defeats him, but then goes with Heihachi to the ancient Mishima temple Hon-Maru, where Jin has been chained to the ceiling. The Devil awakens inside Kazuya, knocks Heihachi out of the room, and awakens Jin, intending to absorb Jin's Devil gene and complete himself. Jin overpowers and defeats Kazuya as Heihachi awakens and challenges his grandson. Though weary, Jin also defeats Heihachi and prepares to kill him, but he is stopped by a vision of his mother Jun Kazama. Subtly warning Heihachi that this will be the final time he is shown mercy, Jin flies through the roof of Hon-Maru into the night.

== Development and release ==
At E3 2001, Namco showed a teaser for Tekken 4. In a June 2001 investor meeting in Tokyo, Namco mentioned Tekken 4 as being one of the games central to its PlayStation 2 strategy. A playable arcade demo was shown at a Tokyo event the same month, with eight of the ten announced characters playable. On August 21, 2001, Namco shared its first American locations for the arcade version. The Korean PlayStation 2 version, which predated the American and European versions by two months, introduced Korean voice lines for Hwoarang that were also used in those versions.

== Reception ==
Reception

Aggregate scores
Aggregator	Score
GameRankings	81%
Metacritic	79/100

Review scores
Publication	Score
Edge	6/10
Famitsu	36/40
GamePro	4.5/5
GameSpot	8.4/10
GameSpy	71/100
IGN	9/10

Awards
Publication	Award
Game Critics Awards	Best Fighting Game of E3 2002
Academy of Interactive Arts & Sciences (2003)	Console Fighting Game of the Year

In Japan, Game Machine listed Tekken 4 on their September 1, 2001 issue as the most successful arcade game of the month and was the top-selling fighting game that year. It also received positive reviews overall and attracted the game to many newcomers, but only received mixed feedback from veteran players in the international gaming community at the time of its initial release. Although the game was still successful at the Evolution Championships 2004 and at the Arcadia Tournament, the top fighting game tournament in Japan in the 2000s. Tekken 4 was also the first game in the series featured in a major international tournament hosted by Namco in March 2003 in London, England, with prize money worth over €5,000, higher than the Arcadia tournament and was won by Christie Monteiro player Noam Gat of Israel. In tournaments, the top echelon of professional players were unaffected and still played in Tekken 4 tournaments, and at the 2004 EVO tournament, the same players who dominated the top 8 of Tekken Tag Tournament also placed in the top 8 of Tekken 4. For example, players such as Ryan Hart, who won in Tekken Tag Tournament, competed and was in the top five in Tekken 4, while Anthony "Jackie" Tran and Thomas "Tomhilfiger" Kymn, who were the finalists in Tekken 4, also enjoyed top 8 finishes in Tekken Tag Tournament in the EVO tournaments. The game even sold more in Japan than Tekken 5 and Tekken 6, though it sold less copies worldwide. However, the lower sales had less to do with the game and its serious tone, but actually in retrospective reviews had more to do with the decline in fighting game popularity in general, which coincided with the decline in arcade popularity in the early to mid 2000s when it developed into a niche market outside Japan, where it remained very mainstream until the COVID-19 pandemic.

The game sold over 2,000,000 copies at the standard PS2 price a year later. As of 2024, director Katsuhiro Harada revealed that Tekken 4 has fully grown in stature and has already sold over 4,350,000 copies, the same amount as its predecessor Tekken Tag Tournament, despite when the games were only sold in PS2 copies and were not available in other platforms. This success also occurred when fighting game sales reached a brief nadir at the turn of the century. Harada himself was impressed at the outcome of the sales returns, and said that the commercial success was also found in arcades in the sense that arcade operators still purchased the machines for their franchises. Tekken 4 has received an averaged score of 81.35% at GameRankings with almost 60 reviews and 79/100 at Metacritic. Edge, a video game magazine at the time, gave it a mediocre review, highlighting the game's experimental and pretty nature, and that overall it is a more solid and thoughtful proposition than its predecessor, but concluded that the game feels "over-familiar and curiously uninspired." On the other hand, GameSpot's Greg Kasavin referred to it as "one of the better fighting games in years" and "an extremely solid, long-lasting, accessible, and fun-to-play fighting game that comes from one of the world's best developers of the genre." GameSpot named Tekken 4 the best PS2 game of September 2002, and nominated it for the publication's "Best Fighting Game of 2002" award.IGN's Jeremy Dunham noted the walls and confined spaces as "probably Namco's wisest decision," and called the game "a solid fighter in every sense of the word." A lot of these features and interactive environments remained and have influenced future fighting games, especially in Tekken 8. It was the first Tekken game to win the prestigious D.I.C.E. Award for Fighting Game of the Year. Pursuant to its critical acclaim, it was nominated for a BAFTA award.

The story of Tekken 4 was also heavily praised. The game hired new voice actors to portray actual cutscenes rather than a silent storytelling style as in previous games, which was a first in fighting game history. It was considered the most serious and one of the darkest tales in the Mishima Saga, without completely abandoning some comical relief characters such as Kuma and Marshall Law. Together with this was the tone and atmosphere, which features known classic songs such as the jazz track ‘’Bit Crusher’’ at the actual Shinjuku crossing stage, airplane mixed electronic song ‘’Touch and Go’’ at the Philadelphia airport stage, and piano-grunge themed ‘’Authentic Sky’’ at the Tokyo building rooftop, among others, that added a strong atmospheric feel to the game that has never been explored in an artistic manner before. Harada aimed for such feel for the game, in order to increase its modernity in line with the new 21st century. The music has been praised for its unified direction setting the serious but relaxed atmosphere. One gamer commented that it has been even deliberately made to imitate the PS2 startup introduction music, such as in the ambient character select Jet, made to subtly go unnoticed allowing the user to focus on choosing his next fighter. The game also built on the popularity of its predecessor, by exploring the story of the series’s main protagonist Kazuya Mishima, and his recent activity during the time-skip in the story. His appearance was also changed, but did not reflect his age, as he stayed young and was only made to be more heavily scarred. It accentuated his hairline and his red iris, to emphasize the character's development toward choosing evil and embracing revenge. The artwork and the grunge theme, mixed with electronic-jazz music and gritty tones helped improve the visual aspect of the game design as well.

=== Legacy ===
Many critics from author Nick Hurwitch, to gamer Justin Wong and IGN, have noted the innovations introduced in Tekken 4, such as interactive environments in stages and the first full-use of voice acting and win pose animations in fighting games. These environments, where columns are broken and the crowds play a part, were brought back in Tekken 8. Other gamers have commented Tekken 4 was so far ahead, as the last leap Tekken has made in new ideas, to the point of calling it the best in the series. Swedish Twitch Streamer Adrian Levander, or "The Main Man Swede" called it the best Tekken game due to its story, stages, and character expressions and graphics. The praise for the story, music, atmosphere, and character development, as well as having the rawest and most serious tone in the series, has gone on to grow significantly in acclaim over the ensuing decades. The game was also the first exploration into an aggressive gameplay where backdashing or the habit of running backward was minimized for aggressive poking, such aggressiveness which was not explored again until Tekken 8. The game itself also lessened the number of fantasy characters to opt for a more humanist stance to the story. The game still maintained some of the ludicrous elements and humor that connected with past audiences, as well as a bit of the older electronic dance music, but not to the extent of later games. The development of the characters and the struggle between the devil gene or good and evil was also fully explored for the first time in the game. Tekken 4 also beyond its realism and immersive experience worked to eliminate juggling, and considerably lengthened the cutscenes than in previous games, which were around ten seconds long before Tekken 4. Harada has gone on to call Tekken 4 the best game in the series weeks after the 2024 Evolution Championship Series, in an interview with commentator and former champion Justin Wong. The innovation in expanding the 3D gameplay with sidewalking and removing jumping mechanics to make lateral movement easy was scaled back to traditional 2D movement in Tekken 5.

In 2008, the newly merged Bandai Namco released a fighting collection of classic games under its original Namco brand: namely, Tekken 4, Tekken Tag Tournament, and SoulCalibur II, with Tekken 4 as the chosen front cover of the game due to its record sales. The title was called the Namco Classic Fighter Collection on the PlayStation.

== Sources ==
- Barton, Jeff (2002). Tekken 4: Prima's Official Strategy Guide (Original ed.). Prima Games. p. 143. ISBN 978-0-761-53940-7.
- Hunt, Leon (2003). Kung fu cult masters : from Bruce Lee to Crouching tiger. Wallflower. ISBN 978-1-903-36463-5.
- Hurwitch, Nick (2019). The Art of Tekken: A Complete Visual History (Original ed.). Dynamite Entertainment. p. 256. ISBN 978-1-524-11308-7.
