= Ling Xiaoyu =

Fictional character in Tekken

- Tekken character
- Ling Xiaoyu in Tekken 8 (2024)
- First appearance: Tekken 3 (1997)
- Portrayed by: Claudia Alan (Tekken Tag Tournament 2 "Girl Power" trailer); Xuan Thanh Nguyen (Tekken Tag Tournament 2 live-action short film)
- Voiced by: English: Carrie Keranen (Tekken: Blood Vengeance); Carrie Savage (Street Fighter X Tekken); Faye Mata (Tekken: Bloodline); Japanese: Yumi Tōma (1997–2009, 2012); Maaya Sakamoto (2011–present)
- Motion capture: Maya Asaba (Tekken: Blood Vengeance); Yuka Hino (Tekken: Blood Vengeance) (stunts)

In-universe information
- Fighting style: Baguazhang, Piguaquan
- Origin: China
- Nationality: Chinese

Ling Xiaoyu (Japanese: 凌 暁雨(リン・シャオユウ), Hepburn: Rin Shaoyū; pinyin: Líng Xiǎoyǔ) is a character from the Tekken fighting game series by Bandai Namco. Making her debut in Tekken 3, Xiaoyu returns in all the subsequent main installments, as well as several spin-off titles. She is a skilled Chinese martial artist specializing in Baguazhang and Piguaquan. She wants to help the series protagonist, Jin Kazama. Her pet is Panda, and her best friend is Miharu Hirano. She is also a distant relative of Wang Jinrei, from whom Xiaoyu has inherited some of his moves.

== Design and gameplay ==
At 16 years old, Ling Xiaoyu's age in her series debut was the result of the Tekken 3 development team wanting a younger girl in the game, as most of the game's female characters were "more than 25 years old". She was created alongside protagonist Jin Kazama by Namco artist Yoshinari Mizushima after he graduated from college, with the character's design being a great surprise to the Tekken staff. Her black hair is kept in pigtails throughout her series appearances, while her costumes have varied from a modified cheongsam in Tekken 6 to a kogal-style schoolgirl uniform in the 2011 computer-animated film Tekken: Blood Vengeance.

Tekken: Blood Vengeance screenwriter Dai Satō said in 2011 that he had chosen her as one of the two lead characters because he felt she "symbolize[d] the older Tekken games". Katsuhiro Harada was surprised by the decision to use Xiaoyu, believing she was not that popular within the main demography. Satō had been a fan of the Tekken games and played the arcade version of the third installment as part of research. As he discussed the handling of these leads with Harada, Satō claims he wanted to use these characters since they come across as weak, something which he believes films require in order to undergo a character arc, common in coming-of-age story stories. The relationship between Xiaoyu and Alisa was compared to the ones of a buddy film. Xiaoyu was written to be relatable to the audience and balance the more supernatural elements in the process. Xiaoyu's relationship with Alisa was made so that the latter develops a "soul" as the film progresses as she is a robot.

Xiaoyu's fighting style is a mixture of Baguazhang and Piguaquan, and many of her attacks consist of pokes. Xiaoyu has the ability to use a stance called the Art of Phoenix, which she's had since her debut in Tekken 3. This allows her to duck under high attacks, and potentially counter with her own attacks. Her Phoenix stance (D+1+2) can also be used to backdash or tap back instead of the known Korean backdash or backdash cancel to create space away from the opponent. It can also be used in tandem with her Rain Dance (B+3+4) stance which would give her a unique backdashing mechanic which is even more evasive than standard backdashing techniques and allows her to move quickly and create space. This technique is shared by her classmate and palette swap Miharu Hirano, who debuted in Tekken 4.

== Appearances ==
Ling Xiaoyu is a student at the Mishima Academy. Fellow students include her friends, Jin Kazama and Miharu Hirano. Her principal is Heihachi Mishima.

Xiaoyu first appears in Tekken 3, where she desires to have her own theme park. The tournament's host, Heihachi Mishima, agrees to build one for her if she wins the tournament. In Tekken 4, Xiaoyu receives a mysterious e-mail, warning her of Heihachi's evil intentions, which she speculates was written by Jin, and enters the tournament in hopes of being reunited with Jin and uncovering the truth behind Heihachi's plans. With the rumors of Heihachi dying in Tekken 5, Xiaoyu is saddened upon hearing about his supposed death and hopes to find a time machine to prevent the whole Mishima conflict. In Tekken 6, Xiaoyu enters the tournament to find Jin and put a stop to the war he has started. During her continued search for Jin in Tekken 7, Xiaoyu is confronted by exorcist Claudio Serafino, who initially refuses to allow her to proceed and later helps her out after being impressed by her devotion to Jin. In Tekken 8, Xiaoyu joins the side of Claudio and astrologist Zafina in order to assist Jin in his battle against his father, Kazuya Mishima. After Kazuya is defeated, Jin and Xiaoyu reunite and travel together.

Outside the mainline games, Xiaoyu is featured in Tekken Tag Tournament, Tekken Tag Tournament 2, Street Fighter X Tekken, and Tekken Card Challenge, as well as the crossover games Project X Zone and Project X Zone 2. She was also featured in the now-defunct Tekken Revolution and Tekken Mobile. Outside the Tekken franchise, Xiaoyu appears as a guest character in Smash Court Tennis Pro Tournament 2 as an unlockable playable character. Additionally, Xiaoyu appears in the film Tekken: Blood Vengeance, serving as the co-protagonist alongside humanoid robot Alisa Bosconovitch. She also appears in the anime television series Tekken: Bloodline.

== Reception ==
Upon her debut in Tekken 3, Next Generation commented that she and fellow Tekken 3 character Julia Chang "conform to different and equally depressing 'cute schoolgirl' stereotypes", while PlayStation Universe felt she was unique in the franchise due to her innocence rarely seen in other characters. Kevin Wong of Complex described Xiaoyu as "what happens when you put an 8-year-old girl's mind into a 19-year-old girl's body", noting her school uniform, youthful appearance, and playful behavior. He characterized her as a combination of "kawaii and creepy". Gavin Jasper from Den of Geek was mixed on the character. Jasper states "In a world that is gradually going to Hell because of the machinations of a corrupt family of karate folks, it's refreshing to see one optimistic girl with the hope of setting things right," but goes on to describe her as "one of the more annoying [characters]". Rice Digital author Lilia Hellal described her as "a tiny badass whose caring and determined nature has made her an icon of this long-running series for representing something different and light-hearted for its storyline and world." Hellal compliments how she "unabashedly shows off how women can still act and be themselves," despite her childish behavior.

When discussing the character designs in Tekken 4, Half-Real: Video Games between Real Rules and Fictional Worlds author Jesper Juul stated that while the game visually presents characters like Craig Marduk as physically stronger than Ling Xiaoyu, the game's mechanics ensure that her abilities are balanced with those of larger characters. Mira Maijala, author of "Designing a character for a finished game world", identified Xiaoyu as an example of the archetype characterized by an innocent and friendly appearance combined with exceptional physical or magical abilities. This contrasts with the archetype of the domineering, highly attractive, and battle-hardened adventurer. Examining Xiaoyu's appearance, Sara Ishii, author of ""Unless she had implants, she must be Chinese": A feminist analysis of players' responses to representations of Chinese and Japanese female video game characters" stated "If a female character's appearance is thought to deviate from stereotypical racialized features, the character is criticized for not adhering to the norm" while looking over a GameFAQs post commenting on how Xiaoyu has some of the biggest eyes in Street Fighter X Tekken.

In the study "Naked and Raw: Critical analysis of hypersexualization and female representation in fighting games", author Guilherme Pedrosa compared Xiaoyu to Nina Williams and Christie Monteiro, observing that, unlike the other two characters, Xiaoyu's design does not emphasize physical attributes. Instead, her attire features bright colors, such as orange, which align with her "cheerful" personality. Storytelling and Video Games Exploring Fictional Universes writer Fanny Barnabé noted that her "childish facial expressions and attitudes of schoolgirl," along with her outfit selection, "speak volumes about her character and correspond well to her childish aspirations in the first game in which she appears, namely Tekken 3."

The staff of Gamest in their Gals Island series of magazines called her an ordinary girl but different when it is revealed her desire to build an amusement park. The staff felt her personality was fearless and cute at the same time thanks to her gestures as well as voice actress. Her character design was apparently born out of the passionate ulterior motives of some developers. The fact that she has to rival adults despite her young age was also the subject of praise. Her relationship with the antagonistic Heihachi Mishima raised confusion over his financial of her dream.
