= Nina Williams =

Tekken character

- Tekken character
- Nina Williams in Tekken Tag Tournament 2 (2011)
- First game: Tekken (1994)
- Created by: Namco
- Voiced by: List: Yumi Tōma (Tekken–Tekken 3; Tekken: Bloodline (Japanese)); Minami Takayama (Tekken: The Motion Picture, Japanese); Ellie McBride (Tekken: The Motion Picture, English); Mary Elizabeth McGlynn (Tekken 4–present; Tekken: Blood Vengeance and Street Fighter X Tekken (English)); Atsuko Tanaka (Tekken: Blood Vengeance, Japanese); Yū Kobayashi (Street Fighter X Tekken, Japanese); Erika Harlacher (Tekken: Bloodline, English)
- Portrayed by: Candîce Hillebrand (Tekken film); Summer Daniels ("Girl Power" trailer)

In-universe information
- Fighting style: Assassination arts
- Origin: Ireland
- Nationality: Irish

Nina Williams (Japanese: ニーナ・ウィリアムズ, Hepburn: Nīna Wiriamuzu) is a character from Namco's Tekken fighting game series. A cold-blooded professional assassin from Ireland, Nina made her first appearance in the original 1994 game. She is the only female playable character to appear in all main games of the Tekken series, (Note: Nina is completely absent from the vanilla arcade version of Tekken 7, but was later added in the updated version Fated Retribution.) and has starred in her own spin-off game, Death by Degrees.

Nina has an unstable and often violent relationship with her younger sister, Anna Williams, who is typically her archrival throughout the series. She is known for her fast and lethal fighting style, based loosely on fighting arts such as Koppo and Hapkido.

== Design and gameplay ==
Nina has a blonde ponytail, blue eyes, and a slim hourglass figure, yet a powerful build. Her look contrasts that of her younger sister, Anna, who is a brunette. She dresses primarily in purple fitted costumes and is commonly seen wearing a military-style outfit to suit her occupation. According to Namco's original Tekken design team, "It was Nina or Kazuya who was the soul, the cool part, of the [first] game." Producer Yozo Sakagami said about their choice of Roberto Ferrari as her character designer, "Nina is a white character, and as you can see with games like Final Fantasy, when Japanese artists try to design white women or whatever, [the characters] kind of turn Japanese in their facial features and just the way they look, generally. And we didn't want that with Nina."

When developing Tekken 4, Harada conceived her like a biker with a designed elaborated based on Lupin III character Fujiko Mine, and designed by lead illustrator, Takuji Kawano. The suit was originally going to completely black but due to issues with the PlayStation 2's visibility it was hard to see. This led to the artist doing a pink suit instead fit with a knife for combat in her right leg. In Tekken 6, one of Nina's extra outfits is one of her Death by Degrees costumes. Her default costume in Tekken 7 is a wedding gown: off-white, burned and tattered, long strapless wedding gown and veil, white gloves and stockings, and white stiletto heels. In Tekken 8, Nina is shown wearing an unzipped black leather jacket, with a purple dress underneath, accompanied with black sunglasses.

Nina is known for her lethal grappling techniques and counterattacks. She also has a versatile repertoire of striking attacks with all limbs. Some of her moves are shared with her sister Anna, especially in the first two Tekken games. Nina was also among the first characters to utilize chain throws, having them since Tekken 2 where she was recommended for aggressive players. In Tekken Tag Tournament, she was noted as "feared by many players" due to her many combos that are difficult to counter, but her command list has a high execution barrier; she is a challenge, requiring a lot of practice to master. In Tekken 6, she has strong jabbing abilities, is agile and has above average strength.

== Appearances ==
Nina, a silent assassin trained by her parents, is sent to eliminate Heihachi Mishima in the original Tekken (1994). Later in Tekken 2 (1995), she is tasked with assassinating Kazuya Mishima, but is captured along with her sister Anna and used in a 15-year cryogenic experiment. Awakening in Tekken 3 (1997) with amnesia, Nina is controlled by the creature Ogre. In Tekken 4 (2001), Nina is contracted to kill British boxer Steve Fox, but abandons the mission upon discovering he is her son. Tekken 5 (2004) features her ongoing rivalry with Anna, where they engage in a gun battle, before agreeing to participate in the tournament to settle their rivalry, while in Tekken 6 (2007), she serves as Jin's bodyguard and antagonist. In Tekken 7 (2015), she works for Heihachi before resigning and returning to freelance assassinations, where she assassinates Anna's to-be husband, who had darker ties with the syndicate, and reveals everything she knows to Steve about their relations to the Mishima Zaibatsu's abandoned past project. In Tekken 8 (2024), she takes over Anna's former position as Kazuya's bodyguard, following her sister's expulsion from G Corporation.

Nina is the protagonist of Death by Degrees, an action-adventure spin-off of the Tekken games. She has also been featured in other series spin-offs such as Tekken Tag Tournament, Tekken Card Challenge, Tekken Tag Tournament 2, Tekken Revolution, and Tekken Mobile, and the crossover games Street Fighter X Tekken and The King of Fighters All Star. Additionally, she appears in the 1998 animated film Tekken: The Motion Picture, the 2009 Tekken film adaptation, the 2011 animated film Tekken: Blood Vengeance, and the 2022 anime Tekken: Bloodline. In Tekken Mobile, Nina also has summer-themed variant named Summer Nina.

== Promotion and reception ==
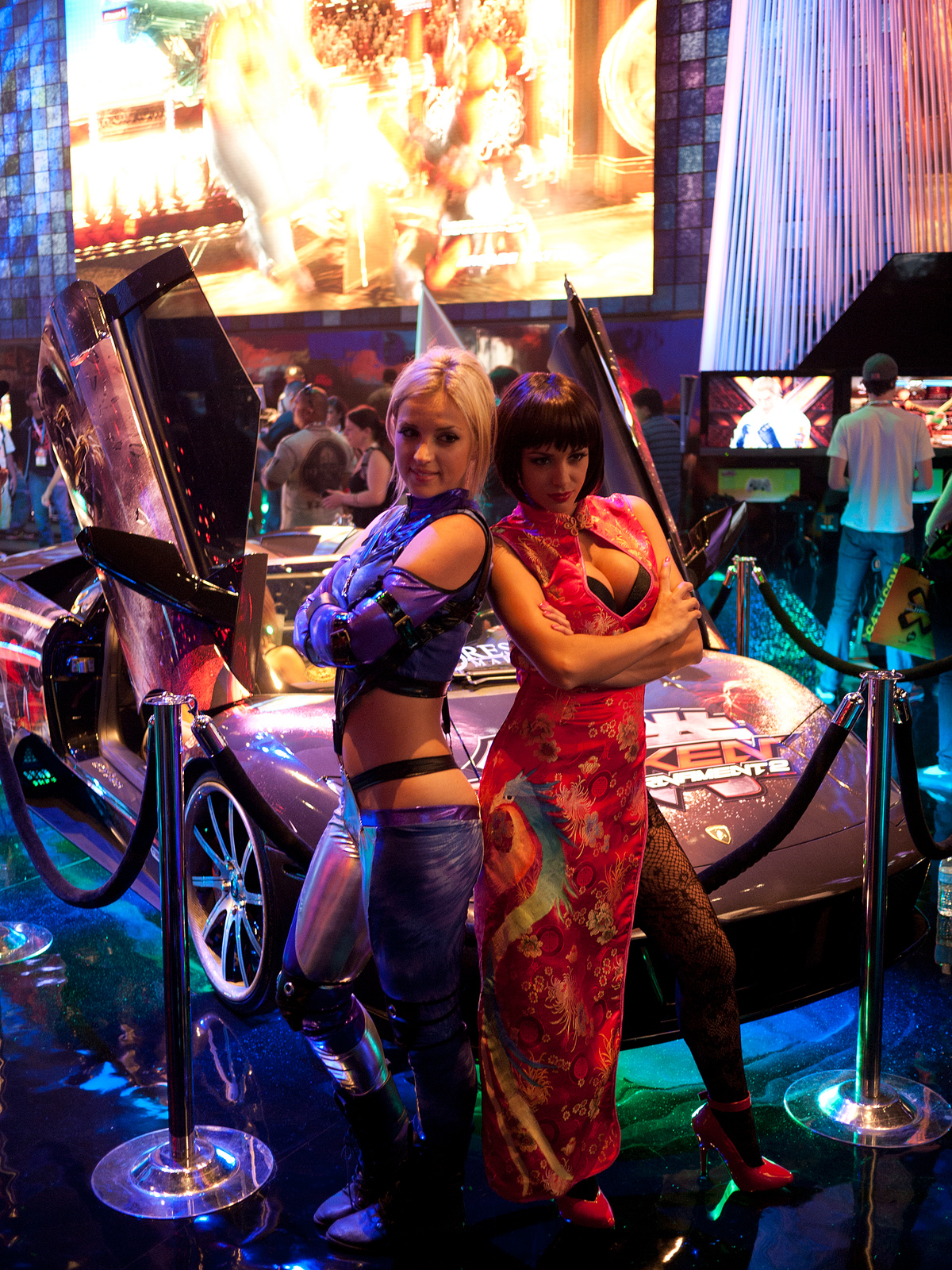
Summer Daniels (left) as Nina, promoting Tag Tournament 2 at the Electronic Entertainment Expo 2012

Summer Daniels portrayed Nina in the Tekken Tag Tournament 2 live-action trailer "Girl Power" in 2012. In 1998, Epoch Co. released a 1/10 scale Nina action figure based on her appearance in Tekken 3, including two plastic swords and one plastic gun. An action figure based on her appearance from Tekken 5 was released in 2006; two figures based on her appearance in Death by Degrees were also released that same year. Kotabukiya released a bishōjo figure of Nina from Tag Tournament 2 designed by Shunya Yamashita for the 20th anniversary of Tekken in 2014. In 2017, Nina was one of the five Tekken characters to receive a Funko Pop.

Nina has been well received since her debut, and has been routinely praised as one of the sexiest and strongest female characters in video games. Gavin Jasper from Den of Geek praised her recurring conflict with Anna, both as siblings and assassins, describing their relationship as very "Batman/Joker and further adding that "Anna makes Nina more interesting by existing, but Anna would be nothing without Nina." James Mielke of GMR meanwhile heavily praised her attractiveness and purple jumpsuit outfit, and saw her as deviating from the "myth" of fighting game characters as "two-dimensional cutouts". He further felt that her then-upcoming role in Death by Degrees not only would allow her to possibly become "the next great action heroine" but also fill a void they felt existed amongst strong female protagonists in video games at the time.

In a 2020 retrospective, Caroline O'Donoghue in an article for The Guardian felt that while Nina was often overlooked when it came to the subject of classic female video game characters, she appreciated the character nonetheless. O'Donoghue stated "It wasn’t just that she was Irish", something she was surprised she had in common with Nina, "it was that I felt as if I knew things about her". She emphasized how well the character's story was fleshed out through the course of the series which she described as part "soap opera, anime, drama, toy commercial" that often relied on the player to piece the elements together. But even in that context she appreciated how Nina was portrayed as a mother and a character with her own struggles with her family, illustrating her character's particular hero's journey. She felt the Tekken franchise juggled these aspects well with their cast, and with it paid did better with the stories of their female characters than other franchises by comparison.

In the context of other female fighting game characters, the staff of Game On! USA compared her to Virtua Fighter's Sarah Bryant due to their similar character designs, with writer Roger Miller feeling Sarah was the superior character that Nina appeared to more copy traits from. Miller further argued that Nina was overshadowed in her own game by characters such as Michelle Chang who he described as being a "more user-friendly, manga-like character". University of Delaware professor Rachael Hutchinson meanwhile felt that Nina took design cues from Sarah, following the template of a female character with a "tall frame, blond hair and jutting breasts". She further stated her belief that the increased sexualization in Nina's design as the Tekken series progressed was in part response to the introduction of more sexualized characters such as Ivy Valentine in the Soulcalibur franchise, causing "a ‘sexualization race’ among companies who could produce (and get away with) the most outrageous skin exposure and physical forms" which eventually led to the creation of titles such as Tecmo's Dead or Alive Xtreme Beach Volleyball.

On the other hand, the paper "Kawaii Killers and Femme Fatales" published in the Journal of Broadcasting & Electronic Media cited Nina as an example of a "vamp" archetype, a display of hostile sexuality in character design, in particular due to her characterization in Death by Degrees. Describing her as physically representing a femme fatale due to how her skintight attire illustrated her as using her body as "both object and weapon" against multiple male enemies, the authors pointed out in contrast her narrative never had her employ her sexuality as a means to an end. Instead of being explored, they felt her sexual display was "paper thin", and while she was portrayed with masculine traits of power and violent actions they saw it as undermined by her body becoming more exposed as the game progressed. They were also critical of her negative reactions towards others in the game that tried to lean on her for emotional support, feeling it painted her as an "unfeeling cyborg more than a human with her own feelings or objectives".
