= Kazuya Mishima =

Tekken character

- Tekken character
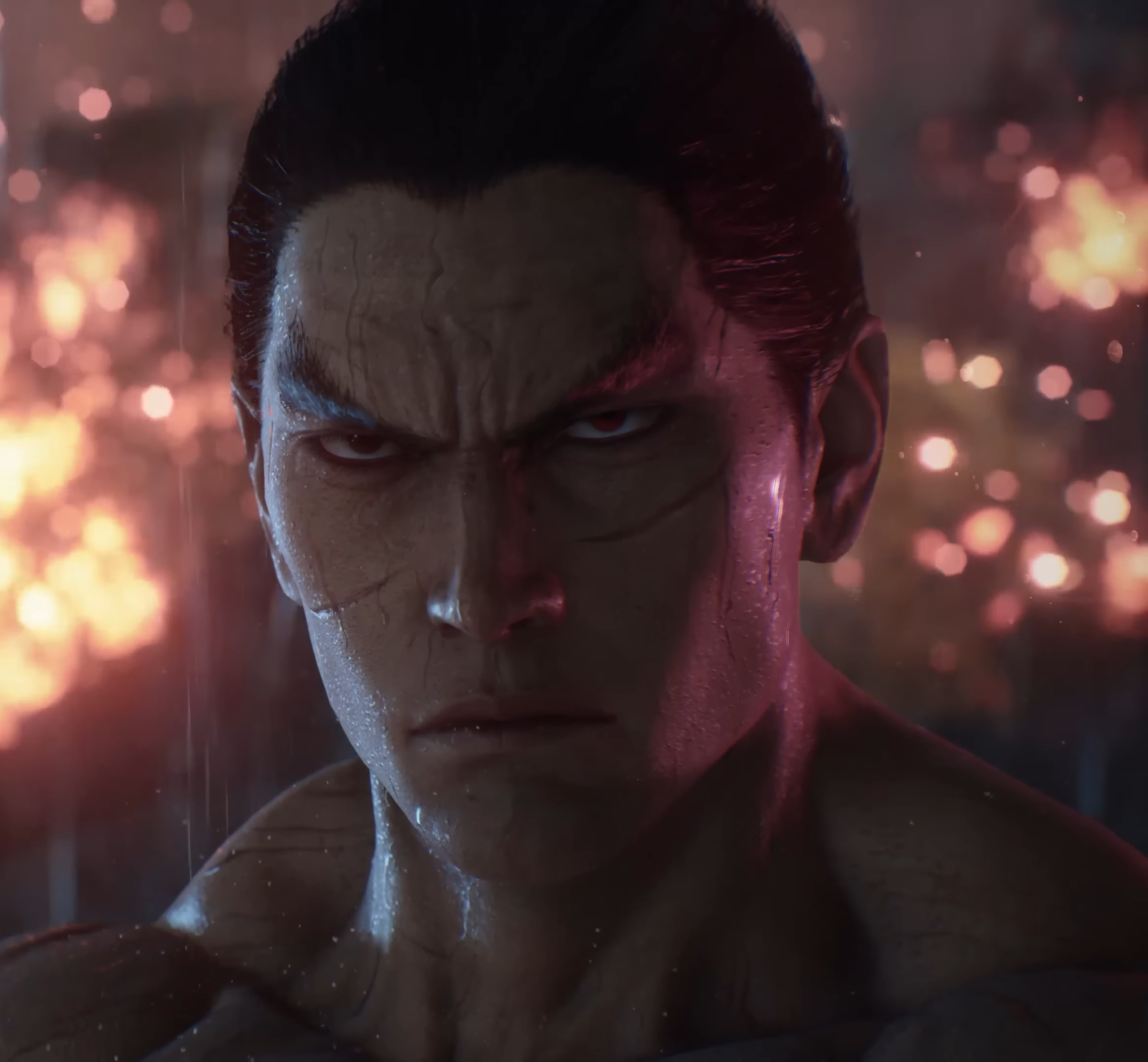
- Kazuya Mishima in Tekken 8 (2024)
- First appearance: Tekken (1994)
- Created by: Seiichi Ishii
- Voiced by: Masanori Shinohara (since Tekken 4) Others: Jōji Nakata (Tekken – Tekken Tag Tournament); Kazuhiro Yamaji (Tekken: The Motion Picture, Japanese); Minami Takayama (Tekken: The Motion Picture, Japanese) (young); Adam Dudley (Tekken: The Motion Picture, English); Jacob Franchek (Tekken: The Motion Picture, English) (young); Ryoko Shiraishi (Tekken 5 – Tekken 7) (young); Kyle Hebert (Tekken: Blood Vengeance, English); Jordan Byrne (Street Fighter X Tekken, English); Eliot (Tekken: Bloodline, English)
- Portrayed by: Ian Anthony Dale (Tekken film); Kefi Abrikh (Tekken Tag Tournament 2 live-action short film); Kane Kosugi (Tekken 2: Kazuya's Revenge)
- Motion capture: Ryu Narushima; Noriyuki Osada (Tekken: Blood Vengeance); Masaki Onishi (Tekken: Blood Vengeance) (stunts)

In-universe information
- Fighting style: Mishima-ryu Karate (based on Shōtōkan)
- Children: Jin Kazama
- Origin: Japan
- Nationality: Stateless (Renounced Japanese nationality)

Kazuya Mishima (Japanese: 三島 一八, Hepburn: Mishima Kazuya) is a character and one of the main antagonists of Bandai Namco's Tekken series. Debuting as the protagonist of the original game, Kazuya has since become one of the series' most prominent villains after serving as the penultimate boss of the series' second installment. The son of wealthy zaibatsu CEO Heihachi Mishima, Kazuya seeks revenge against his father for throwing him off a cliff years earlier. Kazuya becomes corrupted in later games, seeking to obtain more power and eventually coming into conflict with his own son, Jin. Kazuya Mishima possesses the Devil Gene, a demonic mutation, which he inherited from his late mother, Kazumi, which can transform him into a demonic version of himself known as Devil Kazuya (デビル一八, Debiru Kazuya). Devil Kazuya has often appeared as a separate character in older installments prior to becoming part of Kazuya's moveset in Tekken Tag Tournament 2 and later games. Kazuya Mishima is also present in related series media and other games.

The character was based on writer Yukio Mishima, with whom he shares a last name. A number of staff members have considered him one of the franchise's strongest characters, which has led to debates about reducing the damage of some of his moves or removing them altogether. Kazuya Mishima's devil form was created to bring unrealistic fighters into the series. Several voice actors have portrayed Kazuya Mishima in video games and films related to Tekken. In addition to appearances in spin-offs in the Tekken series, Kazuya also appears as a playable character in Namco × Capcom, Project X Zone 2, Street Fighter X Tekken, The King of Fighters All Star, and Super Smash Bros. Ultimate.

Kazuya Mishima has received critical acclaim. A number of websites have listed him as one of the best Tekken characters and one of the best characters in fighting games. Journalists have praised Kazuya's moves and dark characterization, which rivals that of his father. In contrast, reception to Kazuya Mishima's portrayal in films has been mixed, with critics finding him generic.

== Concept and creation ==
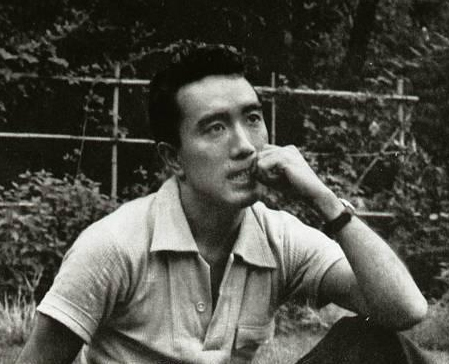
Kazuya Mishima was modeled after author Yukio Mishima (pictured).

Tekken producer Katsuhiro Harada created Kazuya Mishima as a corrupted character with a "pure dark side" as opposed to his father Heihachi Mishima, who Harada identified as having a more "human dark side". The franchise's design team referred to Kazuya and Nina Williams as "the soul [or] the cool part" of the original 1994 game. Kazuya's design and characterization was influenced by a variety of sources. Kazuya's family name was taken from author Yukio Mishima, who was also used a model for the character's physical appearance. Harada has compared Kazuya to a yakuza. When describing Kazuya's personality, Harada cited him, along with Heihachi and Jin Kazama, as the violent characters of Tekken; he described the family as too quarrelsome. Denying claims that Tekken's plot is too convoluted, Harada said that its basic story is a "simple" struggle among members of the Mishima family with other characters dragged into the conflict.

Kazuya's characterization has been influenced by his tragic past. Despite his initial formulaic traits often seen in fighting games in the first Tekken game similar to Ryu from Street Fighter, Kazuya started showing signs of being a more of anti-stereotypical in the story; this was due to him becoming the villain from Tekken 2, clashing with his father multiple times who was originally the boss of the first Tekken game. Harada described Kazuya as focused on power; writing that the character addresses "different types of power", he explained: "that's kind of the story of Tekken and it's shown as the certain reality of people themselves rather than the idea law and order."

Namco created Tekken 7's storyline as a conclusion for Kazuya's struggle with Heihachi, though the company wanted the game's overall plot to be easily understood by newcomers. Harada also wanted the game to flesh out the characters' relationship and reveal why they are enemies. As part of the promotion for Tekken 7, he said that either Kazuya or Heihachi would die in their final fight. The game's story mode includes a young Kazuya during the time Heihachi threw his son through a cliff following a fight; Harada said that the version of the character may be playable depending on fan demand. Harada called Kazuya's final fight with Heihachi a "major milestone in the storyline". Surprised by the length of the rivalry between the characters and Tekken's popularity as a franchise, he felt it necessary to end in a fight to the death. Although Kazuya's rivalry with Heihachi ended in Tekken 7, his relationship with his son Jin was left unresolved. Harada said that Jin's mother Jun Kazama would be "an important and essential element in talking about the story of Kazuya and Jin". Kazuya's relationship with Jun has been described as a common love story in regards to the interactions between a corrupted man and a good-natured woman, respectively. While Jun was originally meant to be Kazuya's enemy in Tekken 2, the two end up becoming lovers due to Jun finding the hidden caring side in Kazuya behind his devil persona.

Kazuya has appeared in games with Street Fighter characters. Kazuya fights Akuma during the end of Tekken 7's story mode; Harada explained that the outcome of the fight was intentionally ambiguous, saying: "It's still a work in progress." He joked that a scene with either character winning or being killed could negatively affect Namco's relationship with Capcom, particularly Capcom CEO Kenzo Tsujimoto. Kazuya teamed up with Nina for the crossover game Street Fighter X Tekken. When creating the illustrations for the characters, artist Kazuma Teshigawara said that he wanted them to complement one another. Nina was selected for the game instead of Anna Williams since her cold personality was similar to Kazuya's. The two characters were featured in the game's first trailer in a fight against Street Fighter characters Ryu and Ken Masters; the trailer was intended to attract the audience with the game's main feature. Completing the game with Kazuya and Nina unlocks an ending scene where Nina is revealed as an agent who escapes from Kazuya's forces. Artist Toshio Ohashi described the ending as the game's most cinematic due to similarities between the characters.

=== Devil persona and voice actors ===
Devil Kazuya in Tekken 7

Kazuya's devil persona was created to meet Namco's request for more unrealistic characters in Tekken, such as Kuma, in contrast with the Virtua Fighter fighting series. Devil Kazuya is unlockable as an alternate skin for Kazuya in the first game, though he appears as a separate character for Tekken 2 and Tekken Tag Tournament, including for a turn-based RPG game Namco X Capcom with similar moves to Kazuya. Kazuya's devil form represents a common element in fantasy but it stands out due to its being related to his genes, most notably Jin's own devil. The parallelism between Kazuya and Jin's devils were compared with the protagonists from the Star Wars films, Darth Vader and Luke Skywalker, respectively.

The Devil fights with a laser, Inferno (インフェルノ, Inferuno) (also known as Devil Blaster (デビルブラスター, Debiru Burasutā)), through his staff and a pair of wings were added later in the game's production. He was made more powerful, with his ten-hit combo easily taking down enemies. Realizing how powerful the character had become, Namco decided to balance his moves before the game's release. The devil form is said to be based on Go Nagai's manga Devilman, where main character Akira Fudo develops a similar appearance. Although Kazuya's devil persona had first appeared as a single character, in Tekken 4 he was removed from the cast; according to Harada, Kazuya (unlike Jin) embraced the powers of the devil. In homage to Tekken: Blood Vengeance, Kazuya's devil form from the film was added as an alternate version of the character for Tag Tournament 2.

From the first Tekken to Tag Tournament, Kazuya has been voiced by Jōji Nakata. For the film Tekken: Blood Vengeance, writer Dai Satō added Jin and Kazuya as "visual eye-candy" similar to the Williams sisters (Nina and Anna). Satō wanted the pairs to be played together in the spin-off game Tekken Tag Tournament 2, which relies on two-person teams. The story about the cursed Shin Kamiya is meant to give the audience the negative side of the Devil Gene which kills people experimented on and only Kazuya and his son are able to control it. The fight between Kazuya, Jin and Heihachi proved to be the most difficult part to make since it is used three motion captures and the choreography was difficult to adapt. Japanese voice actor Masanori Shinohara enjoyed Kazuya's role in the Tekken CGI film, and hoped his fans would see him in action. Shinohara said that Kazuya is a character the fandom enjoys due to his cruel demeanor.

== Gameplay ==
Kazuya's fighting style is known as Mishima Style Fighting Karate (三島流喧嘩空手, Mishima-ryū Kenka Karate). Motion actor Ryu Narushima performed many of Kazuya's moves while he was working on Jin. Kazuya's moves include techniques often used by his father and Jin, but some are unique. According to Harada, Kazuya is one of the most difficult characters for a player to control. He saw Kazuya as a fun character due to how powerful he is. As a result, Harada felt that gamers who lose while playing as him feel ashamed. While fans often questioned him, saying that Lars Alexandersson was the strongest character to use in tournaments, Harada denied such claims, believing the Mishimas were far more powerful. GameSpy said that while Kazuya retained his previous moves in Tekken 5, new additions over-powered the character to the point that players disliked using him. In the next game, GameSpy said that he was given launcher moves which (despite making the character stronger) could leave the player vulnerable.

Capcom recommended that players master Kazuya's Rising Uppercut (風神拳, Fūjinken; lit. "Wind God Fist") combo, suggesting that it might turn the character into one of the most powerful in Street Fighter X Tekken. Designing Kazuya's moves for this game, Capcom's Yoshinori Ono emailed Harada for ideas. Capcom soon received a Tekken guide and an email from Harada concerning Kazuya's moves. The character's combo had a glitch in this game, which Capcom patched. In the arcade game Tekken 7 Fated Retribution, three of Kazuya's moves were patched to increase the damage they inflict. In making Tekken's transition to the Unreal Engine, the staff was concerned about leaving Kazuya's Electric Wind Godfist because it was considered over-powered in previous games. Famitsu recommended the character to skilled players, saying that some of his techniques have good potential—most notably Spinning Demon (奈落払い, Naraku Barai; lit. "Hell Sweeps"), which makes him Tekken 7's strongest character.

== Appearances ==
=== Main Tekken games ===
In Tekken game, Kazuya enters the King of Iron Fist Tournament to seek vengeance against his father Heihachi, who had thrown him off a cliff for unknown reasons. Kazuya defeats Heihachi and drops him from the same cliff he was thrown from as a child. In Tekken 2, Kazuya has taken over the Mishima Zaibatsu, which engages in illegal activities such and starts a second King of Iron Fist Tournament. He is the game's final boss, and his alter-ego Devil is a hidden boss. Devil is said to appear as an overpowered version of Kazuya who became one with him before the events of the first Tekken game. Heihachi reclaims the Mishima Zaibatsu by defeating Kazuya and throws him into the mouth of an erupting volcano.

Kazuya returns as the main character in Tekken 4, set 21 years after Tekken 2. Kazuya was revived by G Corporation (a genetics-company rival of the Mishima Zaibatsu), and allowed the company to perform experiments on him to learn the nature of his Devil Gene. He vows revenge on Heihachi in the King of Iron Fist Tournament 4 and to extract the half of his Devil Gene in the body of his son, Jin Kazama. Kazuya defeats Heihachi and tries to confront Jin. Jin defeats Kazuya and Heihachi in battle, but spares their lives.

In Tekken 5, Kazuya and Heihachi are assaulted by a squadron of Jack-4s (machines sent to assassinate them by G Corporation for the Tekken Force raid on the corporation's laboratories) after Jin's departure from Hon-Maru. Kazuya jumps out of Hon-Maru, leaving Heihachi to die. Vowing revenge on the traitors, Kazuya enters the King of Iron Fist Tournament 5. During the tournament, Kazuya crosses paths with Raven, who recognizes him after seeing him flying away from the Hon-Maru. Kazuya defeats Raven and interrogates him. When he makes Raven talk, Kazuya discovers that he was betrayed by G Corporation, and that something was awakened from under Hon-Maru. Kazuya realizes what Heihachi has done, and speculates that, in fact, it is his grandfather Jinpachi Mishima, who is somehow controlling the Zaibatsu now. In Tekken 6, as G Corporation's shadow head, he converts it into a military company which is the only opposition to the Mishima Zaibatsu (led by Jin), which has begun world conquest and declared war on several countries. The world sees G Corporation as its only savior, although Kazuya intends to kill Jin and dominate the world himself. He uses the company's influence to stop Jin from world domination. Kazuya meets his half-brother, Lars Alexandersson, before he can face Jin. They fight, and Kazuya is forced to leave. Artist Takayuki Yamaguchi based one of Kazuya's Tekken 6 costumes on a robot.

In Tekken 7, Kazuya's mother is revealed as Kazumi Mishima, who died while trying to kill Heihachi. In the story, Kazuya sends an army of Jack-6 robots to the Mishima dojo to eliminate Heihachi. The warrior Akuma says that he was sent by Kazumi to kill Kazuya and Heihachi, later confronting Kazuya at G Corporation's Millennium Tower and revealing his debt to Kazumi for saving his life from an unknown critical situation he was in. Surviving defeat by Akuma, Heihachi secretly captures images of the battle in which Kazuya transforms into his devil form. He broadcasts the images worldwide, exposing Kazuya's nature to undermine public trust in G Corporation as the Zaibatsu's opponents in the war. In the final battle at the mouth of a volcano, Kazuya transforms into his devil form and defeats Heihachi. He throws him into a lava pit, seemingly killing him. Akuma resurfaces, having survived the previous blast. Kazuya transforms into his final devil form and they battle once more, with the outcome unknown.

In Tekken 8, Kazuya is confronted by Jin on the streets of New York City. Kazuya easily defeats Jin and knocks him unconscious with a devil beam. After the battle, Kazuya decides to confirm his coming out as a devil, while setting up the eighth King of Iron Fist Tournament, with the finals being held in Rome, as the means to continue his previous mission to absorb Azazel, in order to become a true devil, having had learnt that Azazel's physical body was destroyed by Jin, and Zafina is under Sirius' protection after sealing the monster inside her left arm. As the primary star of despair, Kazuya absorbs the desires of the human race to fuel his avarice in destroying the nations' hierarchies and prepare to temporarily recover Azazel's physical body. Kazuya uses a joint assault by the allied armies of Yggdrasil, UN and Sirius to his advantage at the end of the tournament's quarter final matches. As Jin and his allies arrive at Yakushima, Kazuya initiates his warring plan against the allied forces who side with Jin. Kazuya is confronted by Lars, who reminds Kazuya of Heihachi after delivering a headbutt. Despite this, Lars loses to Kazuya and is nearly killed when Jin appears in devil form to save him. Despite Jin's new power, he is overwhelmed when Kazuya prepares to obliterate Yakushima with a massive energy attack. As Devil Jin struggles to stop the blast, an apparition of his mother appears in a vision, who grants him the power of purification. Transforming into a new form known as Angel Jin, the latter deflects Kazuya's energy attack into the ocean below, causing the ground below them to launch into space, which serves as the battle ground for Jin and Kazuya. As both Angel Jin and True Devil Kazuya clash their fists at full power, they completely lose their devil powers, and thereby erasing Azazel out of existence. Despite this, upon landing back to Earth, Kazuya engages Jin in a vicious, final battle. After an extremely difficult struggle, in the canon ending, Kazuya is finally defeated but spared, and he is later found by a seemingly-alive Jun. In an alternate ending where Kazuya wins, he throws the unconscious Jin off a cliff and resumes his leadership of G Corporation, vowing that he will rule the world despite having lost the devil gene.

=== Other games ===
Kazuya is the protagonist of the Tekken mobile game. He also appears in the non-canonical Tekken Tag Tournament, confronting his son's devil form at the end. Kazuya's devil persona is also playable; the game ends with his taking Jun after defeating her alter ego. In the sequel, Tekken Tag Tournament 2, Kazuya murders Jun to increase the power of his own devil form. As of this game onward, he can morph into Devil during gameplay with several new moves, instead of becoming a separate character, while Tekken 7 can only be accessed at low health at cost of his Rage Mode. Kazuya also appears in Tekken Revolution.

He appeared in devil form in the crossover strategy RPG Namco × Capcom, with several other Namco and Capcom characters. Kazuya made a playable debut in human form—also transforming into his devil form—in the sequel of Namco × Capcom's successor, Project X Zone 2, teaming up with his son, Jin. Kazuya's image is downloadable content in Namco's Ace Combat: Assault Horizon, and it appears as in Taiko: Drum Master V Version. Although he does not appear, Kazuya is mentioned in the crossover fighting game PlayStation All-Stars Battle Royale.

He was one of the first characters featured in the Capcom's crossover fighting game, Street Fighter X Tekken. In the debut trailer, Kazuya defeats Dan Hibiki before confronting Street Fighter mascot Ryu. He wants to seize Pandora's Box to control the devil gene, and hires Nina Williams to assist him. Kazuya appeared in CyberConnect2's tactical role-playing game Full Bokko Heroes X in his Tekken 7 design, with a chibi look. He also appears in SNK's mobile phone game The King of Fighters All Star. Kazuya makes a cameo appearance with Heihachi in the PlayStation 5 game, Astro's Playroom as well as its sequel, 2024's Astro Bot. Kazuya appears as a DLC character along with Devil in Super Smash Bros. Ultimate, released on June 29, 2021. Later, an amiibo figure of Kazuya was confirmed at Nintendo Direct in October 2021. Kazuya appears as a playable character in Fist of the North Star Legends ReVIVE.

=== Other media ===
Kazuya is the protagonist in the 1998 original video animation (OVA) Tekken: The Motion Picture. As in the Tekken game series, he is thrown off a cliff at a young age by Heihachi and saved by a deal with the devil. Kazuya becomes bent on revenge against Heihachi and enters the King of Iron Fist Tournament to confront him. Jun Kazama repeatedly implores him not to kill his father; after Kazuya defeats Heihachi, Jun destroys the devil's influence and restores his kind, compassionate self. He spares Heihachi's life and fathers Jin with Jun, but is not seen after the tournament's conclusion. Kazuya is voiced by Kazuhiro Yamaji in the original Japanese version and Adam Dudley in the English dub. He is also featured in the Tekken Forever and Tekken Saga comics. In the Titan comic, Kazuya briefly faces his son before assaulting the Mishima corporation.

Played by Ian Anthony Dale, he is the antagonist in the 2009 live-action film Tekken. In this version, Kazuya bears no resemblance to his video game counterpart, instead sporting slicked back hair and a Van Dyke beard, and is revealed to have fathered Jin Kazama by raping Jun. Kazuya is Heihachi's right-hand man at Tekken Corporation, hoping to take over his father's company, and is directly responsible for an attack on Jin and Jun's home where Jun is killed, leading Jin to seek revenge by entering the tournament. Impatient with Heihachi's compassion for Jin, he overthrows him and orders his execution (although Heihachi intimidates the soldier into sparing him). After Jin wins the tournament, Kazuya challenges him to a one-on-one duel. Initially defeating Jin, Kazuya is critically wounded; however, Jin refuses to kill him because of their blood relation and leaves him to live in shame. Japanese-American martial artist-actor Kane Kosugi played Kazuya in the 2014 prequel, Tekken 2: Kazuya's Revenge. An amnesiac after experiments by his father, Kazuya spends the movie fighting until he regains his memory.

He is present in the CGI-animated film Tekken: Blood Vengeance, an alternate version of the events between Tekken 5 and Tekken 6; Kazuya, an antagonist, faces his father and son and is defeated by the latter. Played by Kefi Abrikh, he appears in the live-action short film Tekken Tag Tournament 2. His role in the franchise is also told in the novel, Tekken: The Dark History of Mishima.

== Reception ==
Statue of Jin Kazama (left) and Kazuya Mishima (right) in Osaka

Critical reception of the character has been largely positive, and he has often been listed as one of the best Tekken characters due to his appeal to gamers. Such claims involve his dark backstory, which often elevated his popularity across the franchise. Kazuya was one of the characters they wanted to see in Super Smash Bros. for Nintendo 3DS and Wii U. FHM compared him to Street Fighter's Ryu, based on their popularity and representation of their respective series. Kazuya was also compared to his father, Heihachi, due to their similar natures and rivalry. Bandai Namco opened the Tekken Museum in Osaka in May 2012, where a statue of Kazuya and Jin performing a cross-counter was exhibited. In 2024, Bandai Namco used Kazuya's image to promote a series of shades which appealed to GamesRadar.

A number of websites have noted on Kazuya's dark characterization in the games. Den of Geek enjoyed Kazuya's strong violence, such as his murder of his grandfather Jinpachi Mishima at the end of Tekken 5. Although GamesRadar noted that Kazuya had been disliked early in the series' beginning, they and other websites praised his transformation into a devil Kotaku compared him with Heihachi and called him one of gaming's worst parents due to his antagonism to his son, Jin. PlayStation Universe ranked Kazuya and Heihachi among the top five rival pairs in Tekken Tag Tournament 2 due to their relationship and power, describing them as one of the game's best tags. While enjoying his appearances in the series, Den of Geek felt Kazuya tends to lose most of his fights in the franchise.

Kazuya's alter ego, Devil Kazuya, was also praised. The difficulty in unlocking him in the series' first game did not prevent him from being listed as one of the best characters, similar to Kazuya. According to GamesRadar, players wanted to see a fight between Devil Kazuya and Akuma in Street Fighter X Tekken due to the similarities in their design. In Tekken 7, a bonus fight between Devil Kazuya and Akuma could be unlocked. Calling Devil Kazuya a difficult opponent, Shacknews and Hobby Consolas said that Akuma offered players a challenge; gamers needed to learn Devil Kazuya's moves to defeat him, resulting in the game's most difficult fight. Den of Geek regarded it as the best Devil form due to how Kazuya embraces it in contrast to his son who hatest it. The eventual confrontation between Kazuya and Jin in Tekken 8 was praised by TheGamer as the narrative does not treat either side as admirable since Jin also commits crimes in Tekken 6 which forced Kazuya to start a war against him and in the latest installment have an impressive showdown with their Devil forms. The same site and Comic Book Resources enjoyed his fight with Lars who Lars evokes the strength of Heihachi when facing his half-brother.

Websites have also noted Kazuya's moves, and his Lightning Screw Uppercut was listed by GamesRadar as one of the most satisfying uppercuts in gaming history. Prima Games praised Kazuya's Electric Wind God Fist for its impact on the enemy and possible player combos, and ArcadeSushi recommended it to players wanting to use the Mishima characters. Kazuya's Spinning Demon was performed by Eric Jacobus, attracting Harada's attention.

Kazuya's appearances outside the Tekken games have also been noted. Alex Henning of The Fandom Post stated that John Kim's Western comics adapted well Kazuya's personality in the series, finding it similar to his game incarnation. For the anime film Tekken: The Motion Picture, Eric Sandroni of Games Retrospect called Kazuya one of the film's characters who seemed realistic. However, Adam Dudley's performance as Kazuya in the anime's English dub was not well received. In a review of the first Tekken live-action film, DVD Talk had negative opinions on Kazuya and Heihachi's subplot regarding their rivalry. In Kazuya's Revenge, Manlu Movie panned the actor's performance. GameCrate disliked his moves (calling them "noticeably generic") and his romantic relationship with Laura. Phil Wheat had mixed feelings about Kazuya's role, saying he was still appealing though longtime fans may dislike the changes to his character; Wheat described the teaser for a new film as engaging, and said that he enjoyed seeing Kazuya fight his son, Jin. Games Retrospect was harsher, calling Kazuya a "flat" character due to his generic traits. With an art piece, Tekken commemorated Kazuya's inclusion as a DLC character in Super Smash Bros. Ultimate. After its inclusion, Screen Rant's Scott Baird expressed disappointment at seeing yet another fighting game character. He went on to say that Tekken has a lot of fascinating characters, and claimed that Kazuya is one of the most uninteresting characters in the game.

== See also ==
- Characters of the Tekken series
