= Tekken 7 =

2015 fighting game by Bandai Namco Entertainment

- Japanese arcade flyer featuring Kazuya Mishima and Heihachi Mishima
- Developer: Bandai Namco Studios (Note: Arika also joined in as of 2023)
- Publisher: Bandai Namco Entertainment
- Directors: Katsuhiro Harada; Yuichi Yonemori; Kouhei Ikeda
- Producers: Motohiro Okubo; Michael Murray
- Designer: Yasuki Nakabayashi
- Programmer: Kei Kudo
- Artist: Tomoko Odashima
- Composers: Rio Hamamoto; Taku Inoue; Akitaka Tohyama
- Series: Tekken
- Engine: Unreal Engine 4
- Platforms: Arcade; PlayStation 4; Windows; Xbox One
- Release: Arcade: WW: March 18, 2015; WW: July 5, 2016 (FR); JP: February 12, 2019 (FR:Round2); PS4, Windows, Xbox One: WW: June 2, 2017
- Genre: Fighting
- Modes: Single-player, multiplayer
- Arcade system: Namco System ES3

Tekken 7 (Japanese: 鉄拳7) is a 2015 fighting game developed by Bandai Namco Studios and published by Bandai Namco Entertainment. It is the seventh main and ninth overall installment in the Tekken series, and is the first in that series to be released for PC. Tekken 7 was released to arcades in March 2015. An updated arcade version, Tekken 7: Fated Retribution, was released in July 2016, and features expanded content including new stages, costumes, items and characters. The home versions released for PlayStation 4, Windows, and Xbox One in June 2017 were based on Fated Retribution.

Set shortly after the events of Tekken 6, the plot focuses on the events leading up to the final battle between martial artist Heihachi Mishima and his son, Kazuya. Tekken 7 introduces several new elements to the fighting system, such as Rage Arts and the Power Crush mechanic, making the game more beginner friendly than previous iterations in the series. Tekken 7 was a critical and commercial success, selling 12 million copies as of July 2024. A sequel, Tekken 8, was released on January 26, 2024.

== Plot ==
After the events of Tekken 6, though Azazel was defeated by Jin Kazama, the war between the Mishima Zaibatsu and G Corporation continues to ravage the world. The game's story is told from the perspective of a reporter whose wife and son are killed in the crossfire, leading him to begin writing an exposé on the Mishima Zaibatsu and G Corporation. Nina Williams leads the Zaibatsu in Jin's absence, attempting to locate him, but Heihachi Mishima takes advantage of the vacuum of power and forces Nina to work for him, regaining control of the Zaibatsu. Heihachi makes a deal with Claudio Serafino, head of the powerful Sirius Marksmen organization, to help him expose his son, G Corporation head Kazuya Mishima, believing public opinion will shift in the Zaibatsu's favor if Kazuya's Devil Gene is revealed. Claudio senses a powerful force in the Far East that is unconnected to either Jin or Kazuya.

The reporter researches the Mishima family history, learning that Heihachi's coup against his father Jinpachi and the death of his wife Kazumi both occurred in the same year he threw his son Kazuya into a ravine. Meanwhile, the United Nations intelligence group has located Jin. Hwoarang fought and defeated Jin in his Devil form, but UN interference caused Hwoarang to lose sight of him. Jin evades capture long enough to be rescued by his half-uncle Lars Alexandersson. Lars takes Jin to recuperate at Violet Systems, where Jin's adoptive uncle Lee Chaolan has repaired Alisa Bosconovitch following her seemingly permanent shutdown in the previous game. The Zaibatsu attacks the compound, but the trio is able to secure Jin. The reporter, having rendezvoused with Lee and Lars, tries to kill Jin in his sleep, but is discouraged by Lars, who says Jin is the only person capable of stopping the conflict. According to Lee, the reason behind Heihachi fathering Lars was to confirm that he did not possess the Devil Gene, proving it originated from the Hachijo, Kazumi's family.

The force sensed by Claudio is eventually revealed to be Akuma, who made a promise to Kazumi that he would kill Heihachi and Kazuya if she fails to, as she predicted both of them would engulf the world in war and destruction. He defeats Heihachi after their temporary alliance on fending off an attack by an army of Jack-6's at the Mishima Dojo, and proceeds to G Corporation's Millennium Tower. Heihachi survives, but declares himself dead to the public to continue his plans in secret. He then captures and spreads images of a transformed Kazuya worldwide before using an orbital laser weapon to obliterate Millennium Tower. Kazuya survives the attack and destroys the satellite, with the wreckage destroying a town and again slandering the Zaibatsu. The reporter uses this opportunity to inform Zaibatsu about his exposé, but to his surprise, Heihachi offers to meet him in person. Heihachi recounts his love for Kazumi and the night he learned that she possessed the Devil Gene and was sent by her family to kill him, regretfully being forced to kill her in self-defense, which eventually marked the feud amongst the Mishima clansmen as of the present. Suspecting that Kazuya had inherited the Devil Gene, Heihachi threw him off a cliff, believing the boy's survival would confirm his fears. Heihachi has the reporter escorted back to Lars before traveling to a volcano for a final battle with Kazuya. Vengeful over his parents' betrayals, with Heihachi being the one who never told him about Kazumi's assassinations on them before her death in the first place, Kazuya finally defeats Heihachi and throws his body into the volcano. Moments later, Akuma appears and attacks Kazuya, claiming he will not rest until he kills him; the result of their battle is unknown. However, Kazuya is shown alive in Tekken 8 and Jin is stated to be the only one left who can stop Kazuya.

In the aftermath, Jin meets with Lee, Lars, and Alisa, promising to put an end to the war once and for all by defeating his father Kazuya. The reporter, reflecting on all he has learned, completes and publishes his exposé.

== Gameplay ==
Heihachi performing his Rage Art on Lee

Tekken 7 focuses on 1v1 battles. New features to the gameplay include:

- Rage Art: A critical move unique to each character and only accessible while in Rage mode, causing it to deactivate until the next round. If the initial attack hits the opponent, it will trigger a cinematic sequence and deal roughly 30% damage, depending on the character.
- Power Crush: Performs an attack that can absorb an opponent's hits with the Mid or High property and continue attacking.
- Screw hits: This largely replaces the Ground Bound (formerly simply as Bound) mechanic, which added significant opportunity to perform long, high-damage combos, by knocking an opponent hit with a launcher back to the ground into a vulnerable state. Screw hits have similar applications as Ground Bounding moves, but the receiving opponent's animation is altered, putting them into an aerial tailspin (i.e. a "screw") as they fall to the ground. Unlike the Ground Bound, Screw hits cannot be used to do wall combos.

With a new display system, the game's multiplayer allows players to choose which side of the screen to play on. Movement has undergone some changes and is similar to the movement mechanics found in Tekken Revolution, most notably when characters walk backwards. The arcade version features the traditional stage-based playthrough, in which the player progresses by beating five different opponents one by one, ending with a fixed penultimate and final stage. Matches may be interrupted if another player joins the game. Online mode is available for both local and international play. Character customization is featured, allowing the player to modify characters' appearances. For the first time in the arcade series, the game features a practice mode, which allows players to train moves against an opponent for a limited amount of time, as well as an option to collect in-game rewards, mainly customization items, through "Treasure Box" by winning enough matches.

The Fated Retribution update for arcades adds further gameplay changes.

- Rage Drive: Most characters have one or more Rage Drive moves, which are either brand new moves or powered-up variations of existing moves. Like the Rage Art, it requires sacrificing their Rage mode for the round, trading the severe damage of the Rage Art for a move with less risk and different utility.
- Rage Art was also adjusted so that the amount of damage dealt to the enemy is inversely proportional to the player's current health bar. Some players like King have more than one rage art which changes with the costume of the character.

Among several new and returning characters, the update introduced Akuma, the first of several additional characters utilizing their own unique mechanics which follow the gameplay conventions of the 2D fighting games he originates from, including:

- Cancelling successful or blocked attacks with special moves.
- Different jump physics and air attacks which can be used more offensively than the Tekken series' standard jump attacks.
- A Super Combo meter which builds up as the fight progresses, and is spent in order to use "EX" versions of special moves and Super Combo moves.
- Lacking some of Tekken 7's own gameplay mechanics like the Rage Drive and 10-hit combo moves.

Two other characters added as downloadable content (DLC) after the release of the home versions of the game would include very similar fighting mechanics, those characters being Eliza and Geese. Another guest character, Noctis, has more standard Tekken gameplay but can perform jump-in attacks like the "2D" characters.

Updates to the arcade and home versions also added moves applying new Wall hit state-based systems for all characters:

- Wall Bound: Initially, the wall bound mechanic was utilized by Nancy-MI847J in Tekken 6, until it is later being re-introduced in this game, starting from Geese in Season 1, then properly being applied to every character in later Seasons. While it is commonly applied against opponents while they are on the ground, only the guest character Negan can utilize Wall Bound against airborne opponents through one of his Rage Drive moves.
- Wall Stun: Introduced after EVO 2022, the fighter will be bound from the wall behind them while on the ground, whether they are guarded against the opponent's attack or not.

Tekken Bowl, a bowling minigame which debuted in Tekken Tag Tournament, was added in the first season of additional DLC content.

== Characters ==
The game has 51 playable fighters (plus 1 palette swap and 1 in-game transformation) as of Season 4, 20 of whom (plus 1 in-game transformation) made up the arcade launch roster, while 36 (plus 1 palette swap and 1 in-game transformation) made up the console launch roster. The game introduces 13 new playable characters to the series (including a new form of Jack), as well as four guest characters from Capcom's Street Fighter, SNK's Fatal Fury, Square Enix's Final Fantasy, and AMC's The Walking Dead.

In addition, Story Mode contains several exclusive characters who cannot be selected normally, though they can be played with cheat engines.

=== New characters ===
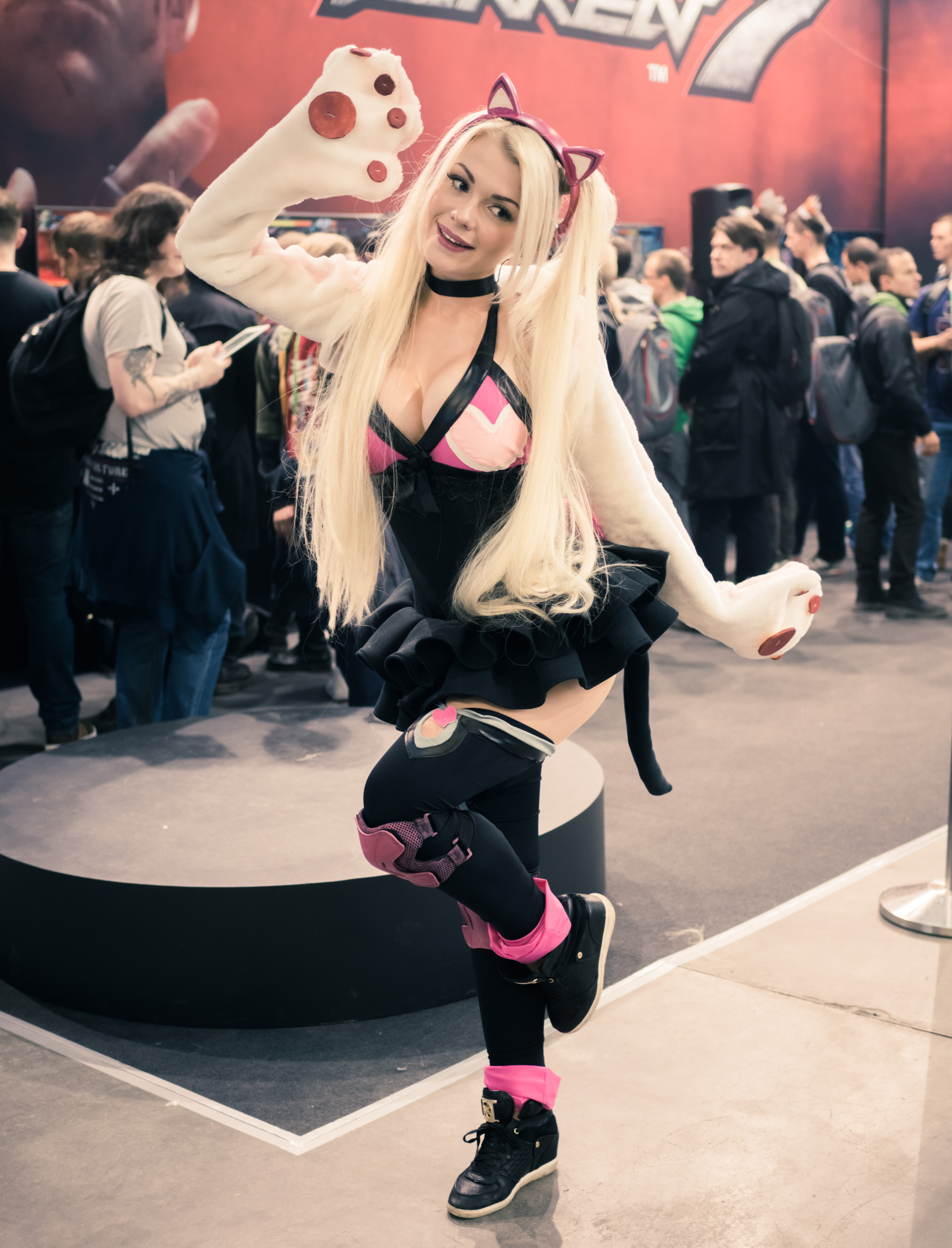
Promotional model of Lucky Chloe, one of the game's new characters, at IgroMir 2016

- Akuma ^{c} ^{d}: The dark master of the Satsui no Hado from Capcom's Street Fighter, added in Fated Retribution. Within the story, Kazumi asks him to repay a debt to her by killing Heihachi and Kazuya. The player can fight him in place of Kazumi as the final boss if certain conditions are met.
- Claudio Serafino: A white-clad man from Italy who is a member of an Anti-Devil organization combating the Devil Gene's threat. Empowered with Sirius magic.
- Fahkumram ^{c} ^{g}: Fahkumram is a tall, tattooed, strong and muscular man from Thailand. He is a legendary Muay Thai champion fighting to free his captive wife and daughter held hostage by corrupt officials.
- Geese Howard ^{c} ^{d} ^{g}: The crime boss of South Town from SNK's fighting game series Fatal Fury, The King of Fighters and Art of Fighting. His fighting style is Aiki Jiu-jitsu, mixed with Hakkyokuseiken. Geese was the second most requested character in a fan poll for a second guest character on Harada's Twitter account, behind Kazuma Kiryu of Sega's Yakuza series.
- Gigas ^{a}: A hulking, red-skinned humanoid who appears to have cybernetics attached to his otherwise nude body. He uses destructive impulse to pummel his opponents. He was discovered in leaked arcade data before his reveal by Bandai Namco.
- JACK-7 ^{a}: A new model of the JACK series, he has a slightly modified design with red hair and glowing green-lined body. As with the previous JACK series, he uses brute force to pummel his opponents.
- Josie Rizal ^{a}: A young Filipina woman who wears a yellow top, a blue miniskirt, and a red bow. She practices eskrima and kickboxing. Like Gigas, she was first discovered in leaked arcade data before being officially revealed during a Tekken 7 broadcast on Niconico on March 29, 2015.
- Katarina Alves: A sassy woman from Brazil who practices the art of savate. She was designed to be a beginner-friendly character.
- Kazumi Mishima ^{a} / Devil Kazumi ^{b}: Heihachi's wife and Kazuya's mother, who possesses the Devil Gene. Kazumi's fighting style is Hachijo style karate, which is similar to the Mishima style fighting karate as used by her husband and son, but with additional abilities such as summoning a tiger and levitating. She originally served as the game's unplayable final boss prior to becoming the seventh time-release character added after launch. Kazumi also has a devil form, which remains unplayable and only appears during the final stage in which she is fought.
- Kid Kazuya ^{c} ^{h} ^{i}: He is a younger version of Kazuya Mishima, unplayable outside a brief period in Story Mode.
- Kunimitsu II ^{c} ^{g}: A kunai-wielding phantom thief kunoichi and the daughter of the original Kunimitsu from Tekken and Tekken 2 who inherited her mother's mantle and vendetta against Yoshimitsu.
- Leroy Smith ^{c} ^{g}: A wing chun master from New York City, New York. After losing his family to gang violence during Heihachi's rule of the Mishima Zaibatsu, he spent 50 years training in secrecy before returning to take revenge on Heihachi.
- Lidia Sobieska ^{c} ^{g}: A young prime minister of Poland who is also a karateka. She fights for her home country and her people from being ruled by Heihachi's Zaibatsu.
- Lucky Chloe: An idol who wears a kitten-themed costume and has a "freestyle dance" fighting style.
- Master Raven ^{c}: A kunoichi with a fighting style very similar to Raven. She is in charge of the organization that the original Raven works for.
- Negan Smith ^{c} ^{d} ^{g} ^{i}: An antagonist from The Walking Dead television series. He wields a baseball bat wrapped in barbed wire, which he affectionately calls Lucille, and uses it to terrorize and maim his foes.
- Noctis Lucis Caelum ^{c} ^{d} ^{g}: The prince of the kingdom of Lucis and the main protagonist of Final Fantasy XV.
- Shaheen: A keffiyah-wearing Saudi Arabian man who uses a "military self-defense" fighting style. He was designed to be a beginner-friendly character.

=== Returning characters ===
- Alisa Bosconovitch
- Anna Williams ^{c} ^{g}
- Armor King II ^{c} ^{g}
- Asuka Kazama
- Bob Richards ^{c}
- Bryan Fury
- Craig Marduk ^{c} ^{g}
- Devil Jin ^{a}
- Eddy Gordo ^{c}
- Eliza ^{c} ^{g}
- Feng Wei
- Ganryu ^{c} ^{g}
- Heihachi Mishima
- Hwoarang
- JACK-6 ^{b} ^{c} ^{i}
- Jin Kazama ^{a}
- Julia Chang ^{c} ^{g}
- Kazuya Mishima / Devil Kazuya ^{e}
- King II
- Kuma II ^{c}
- Lars Alexandersson
- Lee Chaolan ^{c} / Violet ^{c} ^{f}
- Lei Wulong ^{c} ^{g}
- Leo Kliesen
- Ling Xiaoyu
- Lili De Rochefort
- Marshall Law
- Miguel Caballero Rojo ^{c}
- Nina Williams ^{c}
- Panda ^{c}
- Paul Phoenix
- Sergei Dragunov
- Steve Fox
- Yoshimitsu ^{a}
- Zafina ^{c} ^{g}

^a Post-release addition (original arcade version)
^b Unplayable character
^c Added in Fated Retribution
^d Guest character
^e In-battle transformation
^f Skin/palette swap
^g Downloadable content
^h Only playable in Story Mode for a short time
^i Home platform exclusive

== Development ==
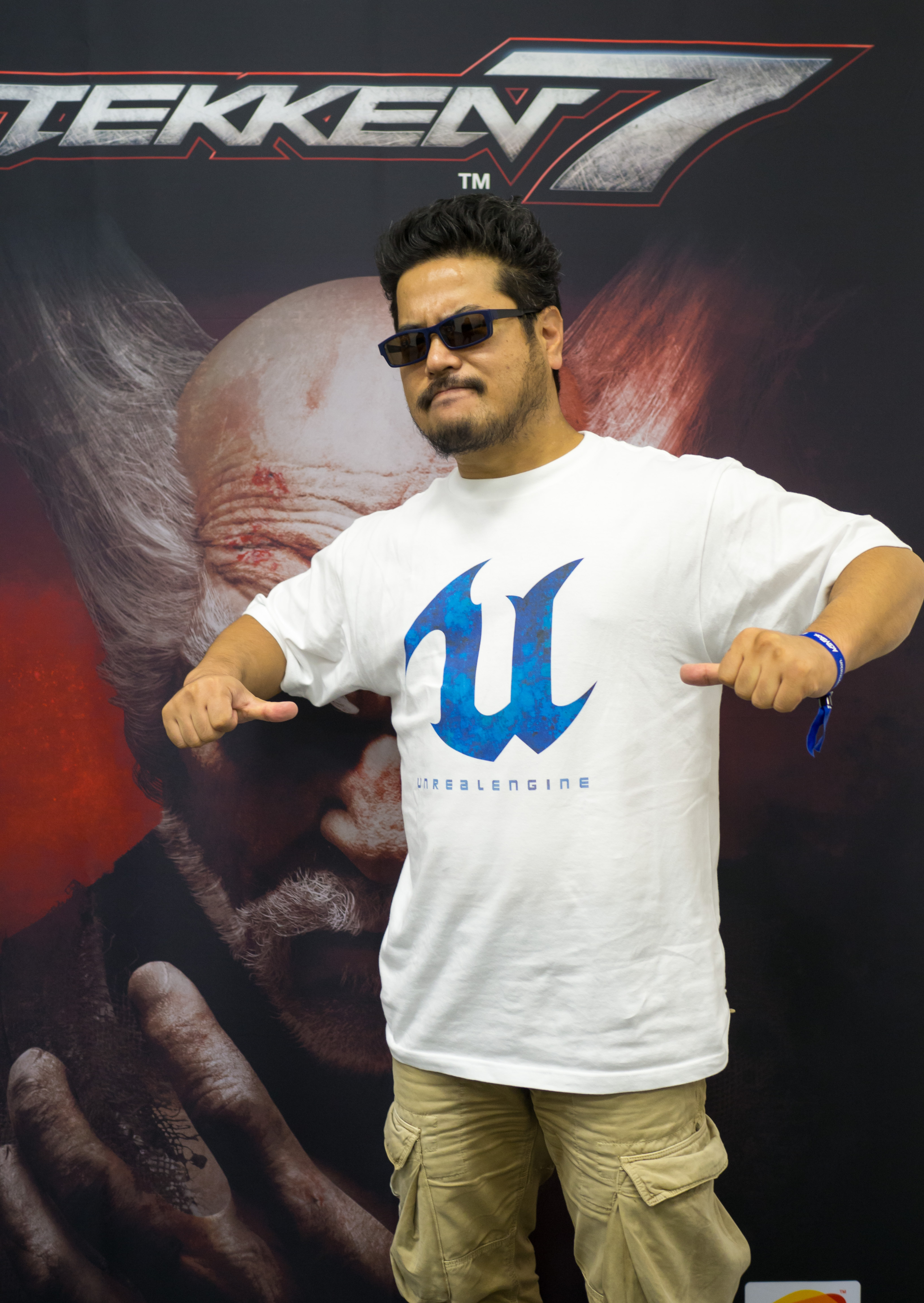
Executive producer Katsuhiro Harada had expressed interest in developing a new Tekken title for the PlayStation 4 since early 2014.

In January 2014, Tekken series director and producer Katsuhiro Harada expressed interest in continuing the series on PlayStation 4, and later said that PlayStation was the primary platform of development for the new installment. Tekken 7 was announced by Harada on July 13, 2014, during EVO 2014. The announcement was not initially planned, but was done as a last minute response to a leak of the game's announcement trailer that morning. The game was developed using the Unreal Engine 4, which allows for it to be developed for multiple platforms. While Tekken games historically have been PlayStation-based in arcades, Harada stated that Tekken 7 runs on an arcade board based on PC architecture.

Location tests of the game were held in Tokyo and Osaka from October 3 to 5, 2014. Trailers released in late 2014 showed the game running in 1080p and 60 frames per second. On January 27, 2015, a live-televised tournament based on the same game build was held in the Nexon Arena in Seoul, South Korea known as "Tekken 7 Crash". During the Japan Amusement Expo (JAEPO) 2015, a newer build of the game was showcased, offering Lucky Chloe and Shaheen as part of the character roster for the first time as well as the traditional stage-based gameplay progression.

Negative reactions to the character Lucky Chloe from several message boards has led to Harada tweeting that he may consider removing her from the North American version of the game, making her exclusive to the East Asian and European versions, and instead replace her with a new well-muscled skinhead for the North American market. It was later revealed that Harada did not intend for the tweets to be taken seriously. Although reaction to the revelation of new character Shaheen was largely positive, the reveal eventually led to Harada making a statement on his Twitter in response to those criticizing the inclusion of an Arab character in the game.

While the announcement and reveal of the Filipina Josie Rizal character was also met with mostly positive feedback, her revelation was also met with a mix of excitement and derision among Filipino netizens. Among the criticisms around the net were the lack of respect towards the martyred Philippine national hero José Rizal, as well as misrepresentation of Filipino martial arts. According to Tekken chief producer Katsuhiro Harada, Mad Catz community manager Mark Julio, and Josie's character designer Mari Shimazaki, Josie Rizal practiced kickboxing and eskrima, but the move set in her reveal video consisted of mostly generic and recycled moves from earlier existing characters in the Tekken series. Someone claiming to be an official of the National Commission for Culture and the Arts was not quite happy with the way the character of Josie was depicted and stated that they would try to look at steps to remedy how she might affect the image of José Rizal and the Philippines by possibly submitting additional materials for the Tekken Team to use. However, NCCA legal counsel Trixie Cruz-Angeles clarified that the agency had yet to issue any position on the matter in a post she made on her personal Facebook page: "The NCCA has not asked for the deletion of Tekken character Josie Rizal. In fact, the NCCA has not taken cognizance of the issue nor issued an opinion."

In July 2015, Bandai Namco announced a crossover with The Idolmaster, a property owned by the company, involving Idolmaster costumes for the female characters of Tekken 7. The male characters, meanwhile, are given the option to fight barechested. A Bandai Namco-sponsored tournament, "The King of Iron Fist Tournament 2015, took place in November–December 2015 as well, with a prize of ¥10,000,000 (~$81,000) awarded to the finalists. Two top placers from EVO 2015 were also reserved seats, as were select players from South Korea, North America, and other places.

On March 29, 2018, Bandai Namco announced that the online Tekken-Net service for the original arcade version of Tekken 7 would cease on May 31, 2018, in all regions, effectively ending support for the game. An update patch was issued which allowed the game to run offline.

On January 6, 2023. Arika was announced to handle some parts for game's recent patch(es) aside rollback netcode, including a co-development with Bandai Namco Studios for the then-upcoming Tekken 8.

=== Fated Retribution ===
An arcade update title in the same vein as Tekken Tag Tournament 2 Unlimited and Tekken 6 Bloodline Rebellion, titled Tekken 7: Fated Retribution was announced in a trailer released during the grand final of The King of Iron Fist Tournament 2015 tournament, which was held on December 12, 2015, and was released on July 5, 2016. The location test was held on February 12–14, 2016 in three arcades of Tokyo, Osaka, and Fukuoka. Several gameplay mechanics were introduced in the game, including Rage Drive and an adjusted Rage Art. It features an expanded content, including new customization and stages. Returning characters who have not received newer default costumes are accorded one. Additionally, new characters are featured, including the series' second guest character: Akuma from the Street Fighter series, who has a dedicated EX meter designed to limit some of his special moves. The console and PC versions were based on this update.

After The Idolmaster series, a collaboration with another Bandai Namco property, this time the Taiko no Tatsujin rhythm game series on August 31, 2016, added player icons, customization, and other aesthetic features.

A collaboration with New Japan Pro-Wrestling was announced during the "an presents Dai Pro-Wres Matsuri 2017" event on January 2, 2017. An attire inspired by IWGP Heavyweight champion Kazuchika "Rainmaker" Okada was added as an outfit for King. A new Rage Art for King inspired by Rainmaker would accompany the outfit. Additionally, NJPW-themed T-shirts were added for other characters. The event ran from January 23 to February 22, 2017. Another collaboration with NJPW started on November 18, 2017, this time providing a Hiroshi Tanahashi-inspired outfit for Lars accompanied by a new Rage Art and background theme.

A collaboration with Summer Lesson, Bandai Namco's foray into PlayStation VR debuted on April 4, 2018. All female characters received costumes modeled after either of the game's three protagonists: Hikari Miyamoto, Allison Snow, and Chisato Shinjo.

Characters then exclusive for the console version: Eddy Gordo, Eliza, Kuma, Lee Chaolan, Miguel Caballero Rojo, and Panda, were announced on July 12, 2017, to be added for arcades on July 27, 2017. Three out of ten stages added in the console version: G Corp. Helipad, Infinite Azure, and Violet Systems were added for arcades as part of the Ver.Q update on November 14, 2017. The rest were added as part of the Ver.T update on April 3, 2018.

An update titled Tekken 7: Fated Retribution Round 2 was announced at the "Tekken Mastercup.10" event on October 20, 2018, and released for arcades on February 13, 2019. The update brought all content from the console version yet to be added to the arcades at that time, including six characters (Anna Williams, Armor King, Craig Marduk, Geese Howard, Lei Wulong, and Noctis Lucis Caelum) and two stages (Hammerhead and Howard Estate). A May 28, 2019, update, announced during a March 24, 2019, livestream, added the character Julia Chang and three stages. Bandai Namco ceased online support for the original version of Fated Retribution on March 26, 2020, to solely focus on Round 2 from then on.

Another large-scale update rolled out on June 23, 2020, bringing Season 3 content, including four characters (Fahkumram, Ganryu, Leroy Smith, and Zafina) and a stage (Cave of Enlightenment) to the arcades.

A December 10, 2020, update brought the character Kunimitsu and the stage Vermilion Gates from the console version's Season 4 DLC. A followup update on April 16, 2021, brought followup Season 4 DLC character Lidia Sobieska, the stage Island Paradise, as well as the latest balance changes. Negan and his associated stage (Last Day on Earth) have yet to be added to the arcade version.

=== Home versions ===
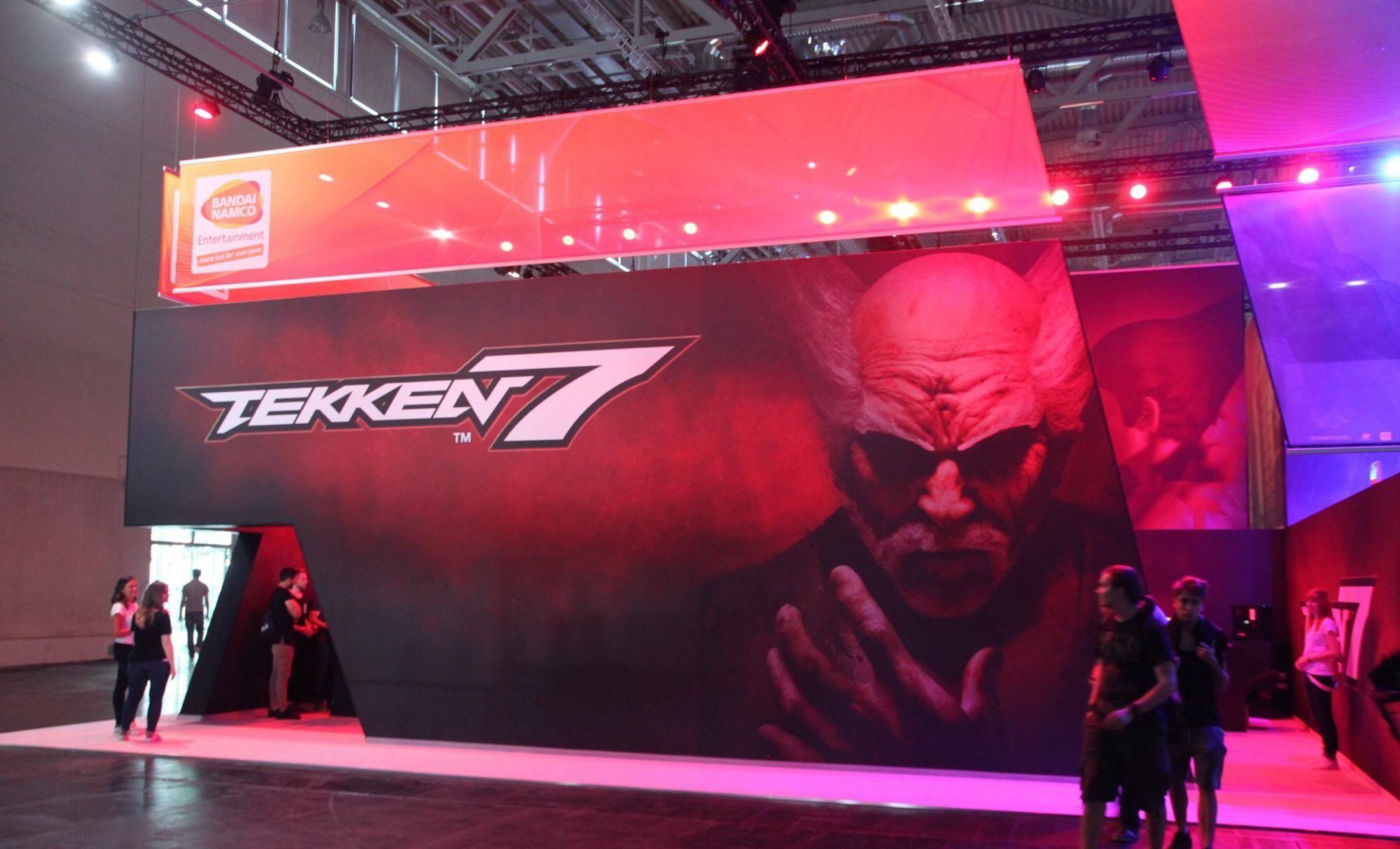
Promotion at Gamescom 2016

The PlayStation 4 version was confirmed at Paris Games Week 2015 on October 27, 2015. Bandai Namco announced that the PlayStation 4 version would feature exclusive content, as well as PlayStation VR support. In addition to previous graphical upgrades in the arcade version, the console versions received one. Exclusive content on the PlayStation 4 version were released in the form of classic costumes for Jin, Xiaoyu and King, as well as a Tekken jukebox with classic musical tracks.

At E3 2016, Tekken 7 was announced to be released for the Windows and Xbox One platforms in 2017, in addition to the PlayStation 4 version. A trailer, revealed during the same event, showcased some of the new features that were included in Fated Retribution, such as graphical updates and stages, as well as a Story Mode, which adds cutscenes and dialogue during battles.

The game is supported by downloadable content. Players who pre-ordered the game received a code that downloads the character Eliza. She is otherwise available as paid DLC starting on July 28, 2017. Taiko no Tatsujin collaboration items were also made available as free DLC on the same date. The first major batch DLC, containing the Tekken Bowl minigame, The Idolmaster collaboration outfits, Tekken: Blood Vengeance uniforms for Xiaoyu and Alisa, swimsuits for female characters, fundoshi for male characters, and Vintage 1920s bathing suits was made available on August 31, 2017. The second DLC, adding Geese Howard as a playable character and the stage Howard Estate, was released on November 30, 2017. The third DLC, adding Noctis Lucis Caelum as a playable character and the stage Hammerhead, was released on March 20, 2018. These three batches can also be bought together with a season pass.

A free update, Season 2, was released on September 6, 2018. It focused on balance changes, several modifications to the characters' moves, the addition of Wall Bound mechanic for every character, as well as Simple Combo and Assist, which were previously exclusive to Story Mode. On the same date, the fourth and fifth DLC, adding the characters Anna Williams and Lei Wulong, respectively, were also made available for purchase. The sixth and seventh DLC, containing the characters Craig Marduk and Armor King, respectively, were released on December 3, 2018. The eighth DLC, adding the character Julia Chang, and the ninth DLC, adding the character Negan and the stage Last Day on Earth, were released on February 28, 2019. The last two DLC also came with a free update that added variations of Jungle Outpost, Twilight Conflict, and Infinite Azure stages. The six were packaged into the second season pass for a cheaper price.

Season 3 update was released for free on September 10, 2019, and again concerned about balance changes. The tenth DLC was released on the same date and added Zafina to the playable cast. December 10, 2019, saw the release of the eleventh, twelfth, and thirteenth DLC, containing the characters Ganryu and Leroy Smith and the frame data display feature, respectively. The character Fahkumram and the stage Cave of Enlightenment were released as part of the fourteenth and fifteenth DLC on March 24, 2020.

November 10, 2020, saw the release of a free Season 4 update as well as two paid DLC, adding the character Kunimitsu and the stage Vermilion Gates. Two more DLC were added on March 23, 2021, which include the character Lidia Sobieska and the stage Island Paradise.

== Reception ==
Reception

Aggregate scores
Aggregator	Score
GameRankings	(PC) 83% (PS4) 81% (XONE) 82%
Metacritic	(PC) 82/100 (PS4) 82/100 (XONE) 81/100
OpenCritic	83% recommend

Review scores
Publication	Score
Destructoid	8/10
Electronic Gaming Monthly	7.5/10
Famitsu	36/40
Game Informer	8/10
GameRevolution	4/5
GamesMaster	86%
GameSpot	8/10
GamesRadar+	4/5
IGN	9.5/10
PC Gamer (US)	79%
Polygon	8/10
Metro	8/10

Tekken 7 received "generally favorable" reviews, according to review aggregator Metacritic. According to Chris Carter of Destructoid, it was an "impressive effort with a few noticeable problems holding it back. Won't astound everyone, but is worth your time and cash," and awarded it a score of 8/10. Electronic Gaming Monthly's Evan Slead scored the game a 7.5/10 with the consensus "Tekken 7, the latest entry in the long-running franchise, delivers what fighting genre fans love about multiplayer battles, but there isn't enough new material to make it truly stand out from the increasingly competitive options in the fighting genre." The game was rated 36 out of 40 for both the PlayStation 4 and Xbox One versions by Famitsu. Eurogamer Italy opined, "Tekken 7 is what the fighting game community was waiting for. Awesome gameplay, new mechanics, great characters and a good amount of contents." Metro summarised it as "Tekken with better graphics - the gameplay and characters are still a huge amount of fun." 4Players called it one of "the deepest combo-filled fighters out there that will give Injustice 2's superheroes a run for their money." Matt Elliott of GamesRadar awarded it 4 out of 5 stars stating that "Despite some narrative missteps, Tekken 7 is still a compelling, exhilarating experience. Find the right sparring partner and it will entertain you indefinitely." Polygon stated that the "unforgettable characters and fluid fights are worth the work." Darry Huskey's score of 9.5/10 on IGN said that "Tekken 7 is a hallmark fighting game that's both accessible and highly technical, with great customization options." GamesMaster agreed, saying it was a "gratifying fighting game". "A smart, blisteringly fun experience at its core, Tekken 7's limited singleplayer campaign and poor tutorials marr an otherwise resounding win", was Dave Houghton's conclusion on PC Gamer with a score of 79%.

In Game Informer's Reader's Choice Best of 2017 Awards, the game came in second place for "Best Fighting Game". The game was nominated for "Best PS4 Game" in Destructoid's Game of the Year Awards 2017, and for "Best Fighting Game" in IGN's Best of 2017 Awards. It was also a runner-up each for "Best Multiplayer" and "Game of the Year" in Giant Bomb's 2017 Game of the Year Awards. In 2019, Game Informer ranked it as the 7th best fighting game of all time.

In addition, Tekken 7 has been especially popular in the competitive scene. The Tekken World Tour was created in 2017 as a season-long, points-based international tournament series that begins in March and culminates in the Tekken World Tour World Finals each December. The Tour has gone on to receive praise for successfully showcasing several relatively unknown and overlooked Tekken 7 players from around the world as well as generating more interest in the game competitively. Tekken 7 received particular praise for its display at EVO 2018, and it was one of the few games to see increased numbers of entrants at EVO 2019.

=== Sales ===
In the United Kingdom, Tekken 7 was the best selling software in the week of release; this is a first for the series in 19 years, since the debut of Tekken 3 on the original PlayStation. It remained at number 1 in the second week. The game also topped the Japanese charts in its first week, selling 58,736 copies. The release of the game also boosted PlayStation 4 sales. It fell to number 2 in the second week, behind Mario Kart 8 Deluxe. It was number 1 in both Australia and New Zealand. Tekken 7 was also the best selling physical software in North America in the month of June 2017, as well as the 8th best selling download on the US PlayStation Store. It was the 5th most downloaded game on the EU PlayStation Store. it topped the charts for 2 weeks in Switzerland.

Within the first two months of release, Tekken 7 had sold over two million copies worldwide. Harada was satisfied with these sales as they surpassed the team's own expectations. Harada later revealed that the game sold over 3 million copies before its one-year anniversary. As of December 2022, the game has surpassed 10 million in sales, making it the most commercially successful game in the series, surpassing the record held by Tekken 3. In February 2024 sales of 11.8 million were announced.

=== Accolades ===
Year	Award	Category	Result	Ref(s).
2016	Game Critics Awards	Best Fighting Game	Nominated	
2017	The Game Awards 2017	Best Fighting Game	Nominated	
2018	21st Annual D.I.C.E. Awards	Fighting Game of the Year	Nominated	
2018	2018 National Academy of Video Game Trade Reviewers Awards	Game, Franchise Fighting	Won	
2018	2018 SXSW Gaming Awards	Esports Game of the Year	Nominated	
