= Taku Inoue =

Japanese composer (born 1983)

- Born: August 18, 1983 (age 43); Sapporo, Hokkaido Prefecture, Japan
- Occupations: Composer, arranger, lyricist, singer
- Years active: 2003–present
- Employer: Bandai Namco Entertainment (2009–2018)
- Musical career
- Genres: Video game music; electronic; J-pop; dubstep
- Label: Toy's Factory
- Member of: Midnight Grand Orchestra

Taku Inoue (井上 拓, Inoue Taku; born August 18, 1983), stylized as TAKU INOUE, is a Japanese composer, lyricist and singer. He was employed at Bandai Namco Entertainment from 2009 to 2018, composing music for series such as The Idolmaster, Tekken and Ridge Racer. He has been signed to the label Toy's Factory since 2019, and has written songs for artists such as Daoko and Akari Nanawo. He also formed the duo Midnight Grand Orchestra with virtual YouTuber Hoshimachi Suisei in 2022.

== Early life ==
Inoue's interest in music began when his mother taught him to play piano as a child, but shifted his interest towards learning the guitar, and also joined a band. His parents bought a PC with music software bundled, which he used to analyse and cover music by his favorite bands. He listened to rock bands X Japan and Luna Sea. After listening to Björk's remix album Telegram, as well as visiting Belgium and discovering club music, he became inspired to create his own electronic music.

During his time studying at University of Tsukuba, he founded the unit applebonker with three friends at the same university. They released original music, remixed tracks by other artists, and participated in live events. They did not aim to conform to a particular genre of music. Following graduation from university, he initially intended to find a job related to his academic background, but ultimately decided to pursue music composition professionally. He sent a demo tape to Bandai Namco, who made his favorite game Katamari Damacy, and joined as a composer and sound designer in 2009.

== Bandai Namco and early freelance work (2009–2018) ==
The first game he worked on at Bandai Namco was contributing tracks to the iOS version of Noby Noby Boy, followed by Pac-Man Championship Edition DX, which he found challenging although he felt glad to "breathe new life into a classic title". In 2011, he composed for Ridge Racer 3D, Tekken Tag Tournament 2, and Ridge Racer on the PlayStation Vita. He felt pressure due to the large fanbase of each series. For Ridge Racer games he emphasized rhythm, while for Tekken games he emphasized groove and aggression. He also composed for and served as the sound director for Touch My Katamari during the same year, and was told by the previous series sound director, Yuu Miyake, to make the music "newer and fresher".

He has also worked on The Idolmaster since 2011, which started with him writing lyrics and later composing songs of his own. He studies the characters carefully to ensure they fit them, while not aiming to compose in particular genres. In 2016, he served as the music director for Summer Lesson, primarily composing music with Mitsuhiro Kitadani. He aimed for its music to sound stylish yet simple, to avoid not disrupting the player's experience. He also created songs for its characters. One of his final projects at Bandai Namco was serving as the music director for Tekken Mobile, also contributing a handful of his own tracks. Aiming to keep up with musical trends, he outsourced several tracks to guest artists outside of the game industry that he was friends with.

While working at Bandai Namco, he was given freedom to pursue work activities outside the company. He worked as a DJ on weekends and often performed at Mogra, which expanded his musical connections. He found it difficult to handle both jobs at once, and often took days off from his primary job at Bandai Namco. He also composed the ending song for the anime Rage of Bahamut: Virgin Soul, along with Koichi Tabo and the performer Daoko, but arranged the track on his own. Although initially nervous to compose a track with two other people, he ultimately enjoyed the experience.

== Toy's Factory and freelance work (2018–present) ==
Inoue left Bandai Namco in July 2018, reflecting positively on his time at the company, but felt leaving would open him up to a wider range of opportunities. He signed a contract with Toy's Factory as a songwriter two days later, after having previously been offered to do so earlier in the year. Although his work with Toy's has primarily been focused on writing songs for artists, he has continued to compose music for video games, including Cygames' and Nintendo's Dragalia Lost released the same year. On July 23, 2019, it was announced that he officially joined Toy's Factory.

Although he was not initially interested in being a solo artist on Toy's Factory, he was eventually eager to create a music project of his own, as his work with the company usually involves taking orders from clients. He debuted as an artist in 2021, releasing his debut single "3:12", featuring virtual YouTuber Suisei Hoshimachi. It was included on his first EP Aliens EP released later in the same year, featuring Onjuicy, Mori Calliope, and Hoshimachi. Also in 2021, he served as the lead composer of the anime The Dungeon of Black Company, with additional contributions from several other composers.

Following his previous collaboration with Hoshimachi, he formed the unit Midnight Grand Orchestra with her in 2022. They released their first album Overture in July of that year. This was followed by the release of Starpeggio in December 2023. Inoue included references to spy and sci-fi films throughout the album, such as "Nikita" being a reference to the film La Femme Nikita.

In 2025, he composed the track "Unstoppable Generation" for New Panty & Stocking with Garterbelt, collaborating with Taku Takahashi. The two musicians created the song together in-person within a day, taking turns on adding parts.

== Works ==
=== Games ===
Year	Title	Notes	Ref.
2010	Noby Noby Boy	iOS version; music ("Noby Noby Conga")	
2010	Pac-Man Championship Edition DX	Music ("Entrance" and "Pac Avenue")	
2011	Ridge Racer 3D	Music with various others	
2011	Tekken Tag Tournament 2	Arcade version; music with various others	
2011	Go Vacation	Music with Norihiko Hibino	
2011	Touch My Katamari	Sound director; music with various others	
2011	Ridge Racer	Music with various others	
2012	Tekken Tag Tournament 2	Console versions; music with various others	
2013	Pachislot Tekken 2nd	Insert song ("Walk Tall")	
2013	Tekken Revolution	Music with various others	
2013	Mario Kart Arcade GP DX	Music ("Tropical Coast")	
2014	Super Smash Bros. for Nintendo 3DS and Wii U	Arrangements with various others	
2014	Pachislot Tekken 3rd	Lyrics ("The Burning Ring")	
2015	Tekken 7	Arcade version; music with various others	
2015	Synchronica	Sound director; music with various others	
2015	Pokkén Tournament	Music with various others	
2016	Pachislot Tekken 3rd Angel Ver.	Insert song ("Your Sunrise")	
2016	Taiko no Tatsujin 15	Music ("Ten Binza Kyūkō Yoru o Iku")	
2016	Tekken 7: Fated Retribution	Music with various others	
2016	The Idolmaster Platinum Stars	Insert song ("99 Nights")	
2016	Pac-Man Championship Edition 2	Music with various others	
2016	Summer Lesson	Music with various others	
2017	Tekken 7	Console version; music with various others	
2017	Pokkén Tournament DX	Music with various others	
2017	Schoolgirl Strikers: Twinkle Melodies	Insert song ("Satellite Love")	
2018	Tekken Mobile	Music with various others	
2018	Dancerush Stardom	Music ("Forgetting Machine")	
2018	Dragalia Lost	Music with Kikuo, Hironao Nagayama, and Yu Fujishima	
2019	Pachislot Tekken 4	Insert song ("Just One Fist")	
2019	The Idolmaster Cinderella Girls: Starlight Stage	Insert song ("Crazy Crazy")	
2019	Beatmania IIDX 27: Heroic Verse	Music ("Backyard Stars")	
2020	Taiko no Tatsujin: Nijiiro Ver.	Music ("Ainandaze")	
2021	Ongeki Bright	Music ("Catch Me If You Can")	
2021	Umamusume: Pretty Derby	Music ("Lightless")	
2025	Once Upon a Katamari	Insert song ("Katamariism")	

=== Anime ===
Year	Title	Notes	Ref.
2011	The Idolmaster	Lyrics ("Honey Heartbeat")	
2015	The Idolmaster Cinderella Girls 2nd Season	Insert song ("Hotel Moonside")	
2017	Rage of Bahamut: Virgin Soul	Ending theme ("Haikei Goodbye Sayonara")	
2018	Back Street Girls: Gokudols	Lyrics ("Hoshi no Katachi")	
2020	Hatena Illusion	Opening theme ("Magic Words")	
2020	Lapis Re:Lights	Insert song arrangement ("Hybrid") with Hige Driver	
2020	Jujutsu Kaisen	Opening theme programming ("Kaikai Kitan")	
2021	The Dungeon of Black Company	Music with various others	
2021	The Idaten Deities Know Only Peace	Ending theme ("Raika")	
2022	Tales of Luminaria: The Fateful Crossroad	Ending theme arrangement ("Answer") with Frederic and Keina Suda	
2022	Tiger & Bunny 2	Ending theme ("Aida")	
2022	Chainsaw Man	Ending theme arrangement ("Chu, Tayousei.")	
2023	D4DJ All Mix	Opening theme ("Maihime")	
2023	Kawagoe Boys Sing	Insert song ("Goodbye Boy")	
2024	Ranma ½	Remake; opening theme arrangement ("Iinazukkyun")	
2025	A Ninja and an Assassin Under One Roof	Opening theme ("Yarenno? Endless")	
2025	Me & Roboco	Theme song arrangement ("LoliRockyunRobo♡")	
2025	Takopi's Original Sin	Opening theme arrangement ("Happy Lucky Chappy")	
2025	New Panty & Stocking with Garterbelt	Music ("Unstoppable Generation") with Taku Takahashi	
2025	Love Live! Nijigasaki High School Idol Club Final Chapter 2	Insert song ("Itoshiki Yume yo Izanai te")	
2026	Agents of the Four Seasons	Opening and ending theme arrangements with Hironao Nagayama and Orangestar	

== Discography ==
=== EPs ===
Year	Album Information	Oricon albums charts	Reported sales
2021	Aliens EP: EP; Released: December 22, 2021; Label: Toy's Factory (TFCC-86794); Formats: CD, digital download	41	—
2025	Futari EP: EP; Released: June 25, 2025; Label: Toy's Factory (TFCC-81126); Formats: CD, digital download	48	—

=== As part of Midnight Grand Orchestra ===
Title	Release date	Label	Format
"SOS"	13 April 2022	VIA/Toy's Factory	Digital single
Overture	27 July 2022	VIA/Toy's Factory	EP, physical Release
"Moonlightspeed"	14 September 2022	VIA/Toy's Factory	Digital single
"Yoru o Matsu yo" (夜を待つよ)	8 September 2023	VIA/Toy's Factory	Digital single
"Midnight Mission"	25 October 2023	VIA/Toy's Factory	Digital single
Starpeggio	13 December 2023	VIA/Toy's Factory	EP, physical Release
