= Tekken Mobile =

2018 mobile video game of the Tekken series

- Key artwork
- Developer: Bandai Namco Studios
- Publisher: Bandai Namco Entertainment
- Directors: Katsuhiro Harada; Yuichi Yonemori; Kouhei Ikeda
- Producer: Landon Nguyen
- Composer: Taku Inoue
- Series: Tekken
- Platforms: iOS; Android
- Release: March 1, 2018 - February 15, 2019
- Genre: Fighting
- Mode: Single-player

Tekken was a mobile fighting game in the Tekken series developed and published by Bandai Namco Entertainment. It was released worldwide for Android and iOS on March 1, 2018. As of February 15, 2019, the game can no longer be played.

== Plot ==
The game revolves around Kazuya Mishima and Nina Williams, who both lose their powers in a fight due to the main antagonist, “Revenant.” His goal is to revive Ogre by stealing the abilities of all Tekken fighters. Thus, Kazuya and the rest of the gang team up to defeat Revenant. It is the only way to stop this new foe, and they manage to obtain and combine all the ancient artifacts needed from the Acolytes of Body, Knowledge, and Spirit. During the quest for those items they fight with other interested parties, as other characters not under Revenant's control also sought out those artifacts for themselves.

== Development ==
=== Music ===
Taku Inoue, who composed for previous Tekken games such as Tekken Tag Tournament 2 and Tekken 7, served as the music director and contributed a handful of his own tracks to the game. Aiming to keep up with musical trends, he outsourced several tracks to guest artists outside of the game industry, including Kan Takahiko, Lagitagida, Nhato, Taishi, Carpainter, Masayoshi Iimori, and Blacklolita.

== Gameplay ==
Tekken Mobile is a touch based fighting game that incorporates gacha elements, as traditionally performed in smartphone gaming. The gameplay and characters are updated from Tekken 7. Players select characters to place on a team and face off against a team of opposing characters. The objective is to defeat the opponent by using a collection of "Waza Cards" (a total of nine in one deck), which makes their character use a certain attack depending on the card's color. Each character has an elemental affinity that consists of either earth, fire, water, or lightning. The affinities give either an advantage or disadvantage depending on the matchup.

Players can upgrade their fighters by getting special fragments (common, to rare) which are bought in premium or epic packs using real money.

== Characters ==
- Akuma (Update and unlockable) (Guest)
- Alex (Update and unlockable)
- Anna Williams (Update and unlockable)
- Asuka Kazama (Unlockable)
- Bob Richards (Update and unlockable)
- Bruce Irvin (Unlockable)
- Bryan Fury (Update and unlockable)
- Christie Monteiro (Unlockable)
- Craig Marduk (Unlockable)
- Eliza (Update and unlockable)
- Feng Wei (Unlockable)
- Halloween Dragunov (Update and unlockable) (New)
- Isaak (Unlockable) (New)
- Jin Kazama (Update and unlockable)
- Katarina Alves (Unlockable)
- Kazuya Mishima
- King II (Update and unlockable)
- Lee Chaolan (Update and unlockable)
- Leo Kliesen (Update and unlockable)
- Lili De Rochefort (Unlockable)
- Ling Xiaoyu (Unlockable)
- Marshall Law (Unlockable)
- Miguel Caballero Rojo (Update and unlockable)
- Mokujin (Update and unplayable boss)
- Nina Williams
- Panda (Unlockable)
- Paul Phoenix (Unlockable)
- Revenant (Unplayable boss) (New)
- Rodeo (Update and unlockable) (New)
- Ruby (Unlockable) (New)
- Sergei Dragunov (Unlockable)
- Shaheen (Unlockable)
- Steve Fox (Unlockable)
- Summer Asuka (Update and unlockable) (New)
- Summer Bob (Update and unlockable) (New)
- Summer Lili (Update and unlockable) (New)
- Summer Nina (Update and unlockable) (New)
- Tetsujin (Update and unplayable boss)
- Tiger Miyagi (Unlockable) (New)
- Yue (Unlockable) (New)

== Cancellation ==
The game's servers were abruptly switched off on February 15, 2019, making it no longer playable. Possible reasons for the cancellation was the negative reception of the game's expensive prices, and lack of revenue on the game's part. As a result, the upcoming new character named Taekwondo Girl did not see a release. Fans of the game gave her an unofficial name Shuwawei.

Kazumi Mishima was also planned, but didn't make it into the game before it was canceled.
