= Tokino Sora =

Hololive Japanese VTuber

- ときのそら
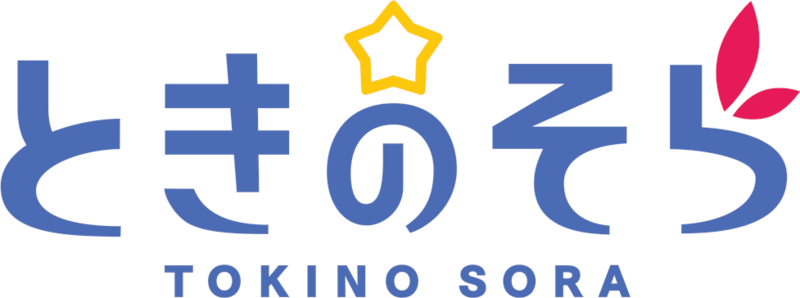
- Tokino Sora as designed by Ordan after her visual update in 2026
- Occupation: Virtual YouTuber

YouTube information
- Channel: SoraCh. ときのそらチャンネル
- Years active: 2017–present
- Genres: Livestreaming; Singing
- Subscribers: 1.32 million
- Views: 280 million
- Last updated: 23 April 2026
- Website: hololive.hololivepro.com/en/talents/tokino-sora/

Tokino Sora (Japanese: ときのそら) is a Japanese virtual YouTuber (VTuber) and singer. She began her activities on 7 September 2017 as the founding member of Hololive Production. Because she debuted before Hololive was officially formed, she is considered a member of the "0th generation" alongside Roboco, Sakura Miko, Hoshimachi Suisei, and AZKi. She signed a record deal with Victor Entertainment in March 2019.

== Overview ==
Tokino Sora attended a music high school. She began her affiliation with Cover Corporation before the concept of Hololive existed. In 2017, the concept of a virtual YouTuber was still largely untested, with the only examples of precedent being Kizuna AI who started posting pre-recorded videos in late 2016. Virtual live streaming had been showcased by Cover Corporation in a March 2017 tech demo, but was still under development and had not yet been implemented on a large scale.

On 7 September 2017, Tokino held her first livestream, and thus began her activities as a virtual idol. Her initial livestream on Niconico is often recalled as having had about 13 viewers. Her later livestreams moved to YouTube. She reached one million subscribers on YouTube in 2022. She starred in the TV Tokyo 2019 series Watanuki-san Chi no.

On October 6, 2019, Tokino held her first solo live concert, 'Dream!'. She is part of a duo with AZKi, SorAZ, and they released the album Futurity Step on 20 December 2023, performing a live concert together at Club Citta in January 2024.

In July 2024, Tokino sang the opening theme song to the anime adaptation of My Wife Has No Emotion, titled "Okaerinasai" (おかえりなさい, Welcome Back). Her song "Brand New Day" is the ending theme for the 2027 anime adaption of Multi-Mind Mayhem: Isekai Tensei Soudouki.

On 7 September 2026, Tokino's visual design received an update, the first part of an effort to update all Hololive members designs.

== Discography ==
=== Albums ===
Title	Details	Peak chart positions		
Title	Details	JPN	JPN Comb.	JPN Hot
Dreaming!	Released: 27 March 2019; Label: Victor Entertainment; Formats: CD, digital download, streaming	12	13	11
On Stage!	Released: 21 October 2020; Label: Victor Entertainment; Formats: CD, digital download, streaming	25	29	18
Re:Play	Released: 24 November 2021; Label: Victor Entertainment; Formats: CD, digital download, streaming	42	49	35
Sign	Released: 7 September 2022; Label: Victor Entertainment; Formats: CD, digital download, streaming	29	43	25
Futurity Step (As SorAZ)	Released: 20 December 2023; Label: Victor Entertainment; Formats: CD, digital download, streaming	13	18	15
Pulse	Released: 24 September 2025; Label: Victor Entertainment; Formats: CD, digital download, streaming	27	36	—

=== Extended plays (EPs) ===
Title	Details	Peak chart positions		
Title	Details	JPN	JPN Comb.	JPN Hot
My Loving	Released: 4 March 2020; Label: Victor Entertainment; Formats: CD, digital download, streaming	16	16	12
Kurenai Kuronikuru (紅藍クロニクル) (As SorAZ)	Released: 4 September 2020; Label: INNK Music; Formats: Digital download, streaming	—	—	—
Beyond	Released: 22 February 2023; Label: Victor Entertainment; Formats: CD, digital download, streaming	43	—	31
STAR STAR☆T	Released: 6 March 2024; Label: Victor Entertainment; Formats: CD, digital download, streaming	21	36	15
Check!	Released: 4 November 2026; Label: Victor Entertainment; Formats: CD, digital download, streaming	12	18	—

=== Singles ===
==== As lead artist ====
Title	Year	Peak chart positions		Album	Note
Title	Year	JPN	JPN Down.	Album	Note
"Hurray Hurray LOVE" (フレーフレーLOVE)	2019	—	100	My Loving	
"Aozora Symphony" (青空のシンフォニー)	2020	—	—	On Stage!	Birthday song/Limited release
"KumoHurray!" (くもはれ)	2021	—	—	Non-album singles	
"Suki, Nai Chai-souda (Acoustic Arrange ver.)" (好き、泣いちゃいそうだ (Acoustic Arrange ver.))	2021	—	—	Non-album singles	
"Happy Meowthday!!"	2022	28	—	Non-album singles	
"Ke sera sora!" (ケ・セラ・ソラ！)	2022	—	—	Beyond	
"Kawaikute Gomen"	2023	—	—	Non-album singles	Cover of a song by HoneyWorks
"Complex Image" (コンプレックス・イマージュ)	2024	—	—	Non-album singles	Cover of a song from Higurashi no Naku Koro ni Matsuri by Ayane
"Okaerinasai" (おかえりなさい)	2024	16	—	Pulse	Theme song of the anime My Wife Has No Emotion
"Lucky 7th Whistle" (ラッキーセブンスホイッスル)	2024	—	—	Pulse	
"Children Record" (チルドレンレコード)	2024	—	—	Non-album singles	Cover of a Vocaloid song by JIN
"Blue Bird"	2025	—	—	Non-album singles	Cover of a song by Ikimonogakari
"Swallow Tail"	2025	—	—	Pulse	
"Ultra Super Infinity" (∞超スーパー無限インフィニティ∞)	2025	—	—	Pulse	
"Dancing Reed"	2025	—	—	Pulse	Theme song of the TV drama GraPara!
"Ketsui no Sora e" (決意のソラへ)	2026	—	93	Check!	
"Kirameki Mode!" feat. Isaki Riona (キラメキMODE！feat. 響咲リオナ)	2026	—	—	Check!	
"Mutually in Love" (スキ⇄スキ☆うろぼろす)	2026	—	—	Check!	

==== As SorAZ (with AZKi) ====
Title	Year	Peak chart positions	Album	Note
Title	Year	JPN Down.	Album	Note
"Scale the Walls"	2023	90	Futurity Step	
"Hikaru Nara"	2024	—	Non-album singles	Cover of a song by Goose House
"Storyteller"	2024	—	Non-album singles	Cover of a song by True
"Rokuchonen to Ichiya Monogatari" (六兆年と一夜物語)	2024	—	Non-album singles	Cover of a Vocaloid song by kemu
"Lum's Love Song"	2024	—	Non-album singles	Cover of a song by Yuko Matsutani
"Matryoshka" (マトリョシカ)	2024	—	Non-album singles	Cover of a Vocaloid song by Hachi
"Yeah! Meccha Holiday" (Yeah!めっちゃホリディ)	2024	—	Non-album singles	Cover of a song by Aya Matsuura
"Kimi no Shiranai Monogatari"	2024	—	Non-album singles	Cover of a song by Supercell
