= Midnight Grand Orchestra =

Japanese musical project

- Taku Inoue (left) and Hoshimachi Suisei (right) performing as Midnight Grand Orchestra in 2024.

Background information
- Origin: Japan
- Genres: J-pop; electronic dance music; art pop; orchestral pop; dance-pop; future bass; nu jazz; progressive pop; R&B; electro house; experimental pop
- Years active: 2022-present
- Labels: VIA; Toy's Factory; Stellar
- Members: Hoshimachi Suisei; Taku Inoue
- Website: midnight-grand-orchestra.jp

Midnight Grand Orchestra is a Japanese musical project consisting of Japanese singer Hoshimachi Suisei and producer Taku Inoue. Formed in 2022 following multiple successful collaborations between Hoshimachi and Inoue, Midnight Grand Orchestra released their first two mini-albums, Overture and Starpeggio, in 2022 and 2023 respectively.

== History ==
Prior to the founding of Midnight Grand Orchestra, members Hoshimachi Suisei and Taku Inoue had established a working relationship, with Hoshimachi appearing on Inoue's debut single "3:12" and Inoue in turn producing "Stellar Stellar", the first track on Hoshimachi's debut album Still Still Stellar. On 31 March 2022, Hoshimachi and Inoue would announce Midnight Grand Orchestra's founding following a teaser shown during an online live performance for Hoshimachi's fourth anniversary; the project's debut single, "SOS", would be released on 13 April. On 28 April, the project announced its debut mini-album Overture for release on 27 July. Following the reveal of a crossfade video previewing the mini-album's tracklist, "Highway" was released as a promotional single on 17 July. Upon its release, Overture received critical acclaim and modest commercial success, debuting in the top 10 on the Oricon and Billboard charts. Midnight Grand Orchestra would further promote Overture following its release with a virtual live concert of the same name on 20 August.

== Discography ==
=== EPs ===
Title	Album details	Peak chart positions		
Title	Album details	JPN	JPN Comb.	JPN Hot
Overture	Released: 27 July 2022; Label: VIA, Toy's Factory; Formats: CD, digital download, streaming	9	8	8
Starpeggio	Released: 13 December 2023; Label: VIA, Toy's Factory; Formats: CD, digital download, streaming	4	4	4
Travelogue I	Released: 19 August 2026; Label: VIA, Toy's Factory; Formats: Digital download, streaming	—	— (Note: Travelogue I did not enter the Oricon Combined Albums Chart but peaked at number 2 on the Oricon Digital Albums Chart.)	—

=== Singles ===
Title	Year	Peak chart positions		Album
Title	Year	JPN Dig.	JPN Down.	Album
"SOS"	2022	41	—	Overture
"Moonlightspeed"	2022	31	48	Starpeggio
"I'll Wait For The Night" (夜を待つよ, Yoru o matsu yo)	2023	35	44	Starpeggio
"Midnight Mission"	2023	18	24	Starpeggio
"Allegro"	2024	—	—	Overture
"Hyper Vip"	2026	—	50	Travelogue I

=== Promotional singles ===
Title	Year	Album
"Highway"	2022	Overture

=== Appearances together ===
Title	Year	Artist(s)	Album
"3:12" (3時12分, Sanji juunifun) (Note: While not officially listed as a Midnight Grand Orchestra song, this song has been performed at the project's performances.)	2021	Taku Inoue & Hoshimachi Suisei	Aliens
"Stellar Stellar"	2021	Hoshimachi Suisei	Still Still Stellar
"Comet" (Taku Inoue remix) (Note: Taku Inoue's remix for "Comet" was originally released as a download code for select physical versions of Still Still Stellar. The remix would subsequently see a wide release in 2026 alongside the single for Hoshimachi's song "Tsuki ni Mukatte Ute".)	2021	Hoshimachi Suisei	Still Still Stellar
"Sugar Rush" (シュガーラッシュ, Shugaa Rasshu)	2023	MiComet (Sakura Miko & Hoshimachi Suisei)	Non-album single
"Jubilee" (ジュビリー, Jubirii)	2024	Hoshimachi Suisei and Kaede Takigaki (as voiced by Saori Hayami)	The Idolmaster Cinderella Girls: Starlight Master Collaboration! - Jubilee
"Kireigoto" (綺麗事)	2025	Hoshimachi Suisei	Shinsei Mokuroku
