= Bob (Tekken) =

Tekken character

Robert Richards
- Tekken character
- Bob in Tekken 6: Bloodline Rebellion (2008)
- First appearance: Tekken 6 (2007)
- Created by: Bandai Namco
- Voiced by: EN: Patrick Seitz; JA: Tsutomu Isobe

In-universe information
- Fighting style: Freestyle karate
- Origin: United States
- Nationality: American

Robert Richards (ロバート・リチャーズ), also known as Bob (ボブ), is a character from Bandai Namco's Tekken fighting game series.

Debuting in Tekken 6, Bob is an American martial artist of a bail bondsman background known for being overweight, and his surprising speed in combat. Bob is also a playable character in the sequel Tekken 7, and returns in Tekken 8 as part of the Season 3 downloadable content.

Bob is also featured in as the non-canon games Street Fighter X Tekken, Tekken 3D: Prime Edition and Tekken Tag Tournament 2, the latter of which also features an alternate version of the character named Slim Bob (スリムボブ), who is depicted as slimmer and weaker than him.

== Conception and design ==
Regarding the creation of Bob, series executive producer and director Katsuhiro Harada stated "usually in fighting games, you have really slim cool-looking characters, and characters who large tend to be kind of powerful, but slow. So, the main concept for him was kind of change that up, and kind of make him almost like a main character." The name choice for Bob initially caused controversy, since the name (which was an acronym for "boy on bike") was previously used by Tekken fans as a nickname for Hwoarang, due to the difficulty of pronouncing his name. Series designer Michael Murray responded that the character was already well into development, and upon inspecting his design, Murray concluded "This guy is definitely a Bob."

== Appearances ==
Robert "Bob" Richards is introduced in Tekken 6 as an obese, yet fast and agile man. Bob, displeased with his lack of power, takes a special regimen to increase his weight, while retaining his speed. After becoming obese, Bob dubs himself as "the perfect combination of speed and weight." Bob enters the King of Iron Fist Tournament 6 to test his abilities, and prove his doubters wrong. His Tekken 6 ending shows him becoming much slimmer; this version of Bob is known as "Slim Bob," and is playable in Tekken Tag Tournament 2, alongside his regular form. Bob is also playable in Street Fighter X Tekken, and was playable in the now-defunct games Tekken Revolution and Tekken Mobile, the latter of which also featured a summer-themed variant of the character named Summer Bob. Bob returns in Tekken 7, where he enters the tournament to further prove his strength, and defeat Bryan Fury, a person Bob witnesses causing destruction around him. Bob returns in Tekken 8 Season 3 as both restauranteur of Bob's Burger, known for its onigiri menu, revealing himself to be a former bail bondsman, and an investigator following Kazuya Mishima's attack at Manhattan Island at the same time he announced the eight tournament.

Bob practices freestyle karate. Daniel Perez at Shacknews notes his "great strength, uncanny speed, and a wide range of attacks," and that it "[makes] him one of the most well-rounded fighters in the Tekken series." Due to his combination of speed and power, Scott Baird from Screen Rant described him as one of the "most unfairly overpowered fighting game characters," and noted "his large size giving opponents an easier time hitting him" being his only weakness. Slim Bob plays almost exactly the same as his regular counterpart, but is even faster, and has less range.

== Critical reception ==
Overall reception of Bob is mixed. In 2010, GamesRadar+ writer Michael Grimm discussed a hypothetical matchup between Bob and Street Fighter's Rufus for Street Fighter X Tekken, commenting, "How two totally different companies [Namco and Capcom] decided they both needed speedy fat asses in their games at exactly the same time is something of a mystery, though ... we feel there's room for both of them." Jeff Marchiafava of Game Informer criticized Bob in 2012, describing him as one of the most "ridiculous" Tekken characters: "Bob is from America. Bob is also morbidly obese. That's pretty much all the thought Namco put into Bob." Gavin Jasper at Den of Geek listed him as the ninth best Tekken character, and stated "it's being a big, fat dude that gives him his unending confidence and charm while not acting like a joke." Sung Wook "Beckor" Baek from InvenGlobal was very positive of the character, opining "plump figure and freestyle karate moves strangely complement one another." Beckor further states "He looks and feels perfect, probably because he just doesn't care what other people think of him," while considering it a "mistake" to think of him as a "joke character." Dale North at Destructoid described him as "[looking] like the cross between an overweight Ken Masters from Street Fighter and Dr. Eggman from Sonic the Hedgehog," while stating that those who "always picks the cool-looking character" will never use Bob.

Oliver James Clark, author of On the Persuasive Power of Videogame avatars on Health-related behaviours, notes "Bob is an example of how larger bodied individuals can be portrayed positively in the media, but there are also various stigmatising elements about him. For instance, all of his techniques are named after chocolates, or other allusions to digestion and eating." In Fighting/Fat: Fighting Game Characters and the Emptiness of Video Game Fatness, writer Todd Harper compared him to Rufus from Street Fighter and Cheng Sinzan from Fatal Fury, stating that Bob "has a slightly more realistically proportioned version of the top-heavy, spherical torso." In the article Fat Avatars in Games and Popular Media by Alex Layne of NYM Gamer, she describes Bob as "a nice violation of what the stereotype of the overweight body can do," and questioned if he can truly be "overweight," due to him "genetically [engineering] himself to be this way." In a GameSpy hands on article for Tekken 6, authors Brian Altano and Gerald Villoria were critical of his stereotyped portrayal, questioning "What is it about these Japanese fighting games and how their fat guys are always American?" However, they were more positive towards his moveset.

== Sources ==
- Gender Issues, Fighting Games, and Progress: Finding a Place for a Genderless Character in Tekken 6.
