= Dragalia Lost =

2018 video game

- Developer: Cygames
- Publisher: Nintendo
- Directors: Hiroki Matsuura (Note: Until July 2019); Yuji Okada
- Producer: Hideki Konno
- Composers: Daoko; Hironao Nagayama; Taku Inoue
- Platforms: Android, iOS
- Release: September 27, 2018
- Genre: Action role-playing
- Modes: Single-player, multiplayer

Dragalia Lost (Note: Dragalia Lost (Japanese: ドラガリアロスト, Hepburn: Doragariarosuto)) was an action role-playing game developed by Cygames and published by Nintendo. It was released for Android and iOS in September 2018 before being discontinued in November 2022. The game received mixed reviews from critics.

== Plot ==
The story takes place in Alberia, the kingdom where dragons live. All royal members in Alberia are able to shapeshift, where they can wield a dragon's power by forming a pact with a dragon to borrow their form in battle. One day, a strange occurrence begins to happen in this kingdom. The Sacred Shard protected by the capital starts to lose its power. In order to save his people, Euden, the Seventh Scion, who has not made a pact with a dragon, sets off on his Dragon Selection Trial.

The Seventh Scion Euden, the youngest prince of the kingdom of Alberia, is told by his father, the king Aurelius, to seek out Midgardsormr, the Windwyrm, to forge a pact after the Sacred Shard of the kingdom darkens. Such a holy object can only be moved by a pactbearer, and to replace the kingdom's Shard, he must forge the pact. He goes to Midgardsormr's home, the Mistholt, with his sister Zethia and their friend, the faerie Notte. He forges the pact, meeting the Paladyn Elisanne and the mercenary Ranzal. When he goes to retrieve the Shard, he finds a woman named Cleo left to guard the Halidom, the former base of Alberius, and the castle's Shard. His father appears and tries to seize it, but Euden inadvertently shapeshifts until the Holywyrm Elysium. Regardless, Zethia is kidnapped by Aurelius.

Some time later, Euden, now leading the Halidom, receives word that Alberia was renamed to Dyrenell, and that it has declared Euden the 'traitorous prince'. He moves to defend a village from the attack of Dyrenell (meeting Luca and his sister Sarisse), and fights a Greatwyrm, Mercury. Mercury formed a pact with the haughty and narcissistic Prince Emile, which she breaks and instead forms a pact with Euden.

Next, they hear that Aurelius is attacking the Greatwyrm Brunhilda, the Flamewyrm. He saves the dragon, and forms a pact at her volcanic home, her joining him as 'Mym'. After that, he decides to form a pact with the Lightwyrm (and Greatwyrm) Jupiter. Emile reappears and tries to as well, but Jupiter chooses Euden over him. A mysterious woman then teleports the party to the Binding Ruins.

At the Binding Ruins, they once again encounter Aurelius and Zethia. Aurelius is revealed to be possessed by an evil entity, the Other. His possessor transfers himself to Zethia, and Aurelius dies. Zodiark, the last surviving Greatwyrm that is not pactbound to Euden, is revealed to be Aurelius's pactwyrm. Zodiark forges a pact with Euden. Euden's older brother Valyx arrives at the Halidom with an army. Euden declares the Halidom New Alberia, and resolves to fight Dyrenell.

== Gameplay ==
Dragalia Lost is an action role-playing game with touchscreen controls, where characters attack enemies with attacks of various kinds. The adventurers have different elements which can be weaker or stronger against other ones. Another method of attack is a special attack where the character transforms into a dragon and can greatly damage the enemy. This can be activated for around ten seconds when they have sufficient energy that can be collected while attacking or destroying statues of dragons. The characters also have their own classes, with attack, support, defense, and healing types. Each character has two skills (barring one adventurer), each of which charges up with attacking. Two additional skills can be chosen from a pool in addition to innate ones.

While the game is fully playable as a single-player experience, it also supports up to four-player co-operative multiplayer, and in Raid Battles, four teams of four. For one event, this mode was modified for each player to control one Adventurer, for a total of 16 characters.

== Development ==
Dragalia Lost is a collaborative development between Nintendo and Cygames. It was a secret project within Cygames, with many of its employees being surprised upon learning of the collaboration, with Nintendo even buying 5% of their stock. The game marks as Nintendo's first intellectual property released for mobile devices without any prior appearance on Nintendo hardware. According to director Hiroki Matsuura, the game's main story comprises more than 600,000 words in its original Japanese version due to the inclusion of character stories and sidequests, with around 100 more words for every post-release event. He has also said that, due to the fact that it is an action game, the development team tends to focus on making characters fun to control. The game was released in Japan, Taiwan, Hong Kong, Macau, and the United States on September 27, 2018, with other regions to follow later. It later launched in the United Kingdom, Ireland, Australia, Canada, Singapore, and New Zealand on January 26, 2019. 8-4, Ltd. were responsible for the game's English localization, assisting in assuring the title's initial launch in the United States and other English-speaking countries.

Dragalia Lost saw several crossovers with other games and franchises, including Fire Emblem Heroes, Mega Man, Monster Hunter, Persona 5 Strikers, Rage of Bahamut, and Princess Connect! Re:Dive.

In July 2019, Hiroki Matsuura stepped down from his position as director of the game with the CEO of Cygames' frequent partner BlazeGames Yuji Okada, who previously assisted with the game's development, taking over the role. In August 2022, it was announced that the game would be discontinued on November 30, 2022.

=== Music ===
The game's soundtrack consists of songs from Daoko's discography and its main theme song is "Owaranai Sekai de" (終わらない世界で, In a Never-Ending World). On October 19, 2019, the album DAOKO x Dragalia Lost was released to celebrate the first anniversary of the game. A limited edition was released which contained a second disc with 5 bonus songs sung by in-game characters. Limited editions also included a 60-page booklet with in-game art as well as concept art. An EP, Overture by Lucrezia, and two singles by Siren (sung by the cosplayer Liyuu), Polaris and Singing in the Rain, were released via Cymusic. A 2-disc album with the majority of the remaining unreleased songs from the game, Dragalia Lost Song Collection, followed on June 30, 2021.

== Reception ==
Reception

Aggregate score
Aggregator	Score
Metacritic	69/100

Review scores
Publication	Score
Destructoid	6/10
Nintendo Life	8/10
Pocket Gamer	3.5/5
TouchArcade	4.5/5

The game surpassed 300,000 registrations in Japan in its pre-registration period a month prior to release.

Dragalia Lost received a nomination for "Portable Game of the Year" during the 22nd Annual D.I.C.E. Awards.
