= The Dungeon of Black Company =

Japanese manga series

- First tankōbon volume cover

迷宮ブラックカンパニー (Meikyū Burakku Kanpanī)
- Genre: Fantasy comedy; Isekai
- Manga
- Written by: Yōhei Yasumura
- Published by: Mag Garden
- English publisher: NA: Seven Seas Entertainment
- Imprint: Blade Comics
- Magazine: Mag Comi
- Original run: December 2016 – present
- Volumes: 14
- Anime television series
- Directed by: Mirai Minato
- Produced by: Kousuke Arai; Soujirou Arimizu; Yoshinori Hasegawa; Hideo Hirata; Hayato Kaneko; Hajime Maruyama; Taiyou Matsuda; Aya Nakama; Kazusa Umeda
- Written by: Deko Akao
- Music by: Taku Inoue
- Studio: Silver Link
- Licensed by: Crunchyroll
- Original network: Tokyo MX, TV Aichi, ABC, AT-X, BS-NTV
- Original run: July 9, 2021 – September 24, 2021
- Episodes: 12

The Dungeon of Black Company (迷宮ブラックカンパニー, Meikyū Burakku Kanpanī) is a Japanese web manga series by Yōhei Yasumura. It has been serialized on Mag Garden's Mag Comi website since December 2016. The series is licensed in North America by Seven Seas Entertainment. An anime television series adaptation produced by Silver Link aired from July to September 2021.

== Synopsis ==
Kinji Ninomiya is a NEET who has amassed enough money through real-estate investment to fund a penthouse lifestyle without ever having to work. This changes when a portal suddenly transports him to a fantasy world where he quickly ends up enslaved to a mining company extracting crystals from a dungeon. Desperate for a way out of this new poverty, Kinji tries to regain financial stability by any means necessary, gathering himself an unusual adventuring party – the titular black company – in the process.

== Characters ==
Kinji Ninomiya (二ノ宮 キンジ, Ninomiya Kinji)
Voiced by: Katsuyuki Konishi (Japanese); Christopher Escalante (English)
The protagonist, a human that will resort to any means to rise up the mining company's ranks despite constant backfiring.
Rim (リム, Rimu)
Voiced by: Misaki Kuno (Japanese); Katelyn Barr (English)
A powerful dragon that shifted into the form of a teenage girl and joined Kinji when he promised her she could taste human food.
Wanibe (ワニベ)
Voiced by: Hiro Shimono (Japanese); Stephen Sanders (English)
A crocodilian demi-human and one of Kinji's co-workers.
Belza (ベルザ, Beruza)
Voiced by: Satomi Satō (Japanese); Sarah Roach (English)
A demon and the mine's dungeon master/supervisor.
Boss Goblin (ゴブリン上司, Goburin Jōshi)
Voiced by: Wataru Takagi (Japanese); Jim Foronda (English)
Shia (シア)
Voiced by: Megumi Toda (Japanese); Madeleine Morris (English)
Ranga (ランガ)
Voiced by: M.A.O
Dungeon Ant A (迷宮アリA, Meikyū Ari A)
Voiced by: Yoshitsugu Matsuoka

== Media ==
=== Manga ===
It is written and illustrated by Yōhei Yasumura. It has been serialized in Mag Garden's Mag Comi website since December 2016 and has been collected in 14 tankōbon volumes. The manga is licensed in North America by Seven Seas Entertainment. It was announced that the manga would enter its climax on June 5, 2020.

No.	Original release date	Original ISBN	English release date	English ISBN
1	May 10, 2017	978-4-800006-83-7	May 22, 2018	978-1-626927-98-8
2	December 9, 2017	978-4-800007-36-0	November 6, 2018	978-1-626929-04-3
3	August 10, 2018	978-4-800007-91-9	May 7, 2019	978-1-642750-85-0
4	May 10, 2019	978-4-800008-55-8	January 28, 2020	978-1-642757-16-3
5	November 9, 2019	978-4-800009-10-4	September 8, 2020	978-1-64505-450-4
6	July 10, 2020	978-4-800009-92-0	May 4, 2021	978-1-64505-773-4
7	July 9, 2021	978-4-800011-10-7	March 29, 2022	978-1-64827-467-1
8	November 10, 2021	978-4-800011-44-2	November 15, 2022	978-1-63858-619-7
9	July 8, 2022	978-4-800012-29-6	October 10, 2023	978-1-68579-476-7
10	March 10, 2023	978-4-800013-07-1	April 9, 2024	979-8-88843-130-6
11	November 9, 2023	978-4-800013-89-7	November 26, 2024	979-8-89160-513-8
12	September 10, 2024	978-4-80001-493-1	June 3, 2025	979-8-89373-285-6
13	May 10, 2025	978-4-80001-594-5	December 23, 2025	979-8-89561-722-9
14	March 10, 2026	978-4-80001-715-4	October 13, 2026	979-8-89765-366-9

=== Anime ===
An anime television series adaptation produced by Silver Link was announced, and aired from July 9 to September 24, 2021, on Tokyo MX, TV Aichi, ABC, AT-X, and BS-NTV. The series is directed by Mirai Minato, with scripts overseen by Deko Akao and characters designed by Yuki Sawairi. Taku Inoue served as the lead composer of the series' music. The opening theme "Shimi" (Stain) is performed by Howl Be Quiet, while the ending theme "World is Mine" is performed by Humbreaders. Funimation licensed the series. Following Sony's acquisition of Crunchyroll, the series was moved to Crunchyroll.

==== Episodes ====
No.	Title	Directed by	Written by	Storyboarded by	Original release date (Note: Episodes are released every Friday at 10:00 p.m. JST on streaming platforms, 30 minutes before the original air time on Tokyo MX.)
1	"Welcome to the World of Corporate Grunts"; Transliteration: "Shachiku no Sekai e Yōkoso" (Japanese: 社畜の世界へようこそ)	Mirai Minato	Deko Akao	Gōichi Iwahata	July 9, 2021 (Note: This episode was pre-screened on July 2, 2021 on d Anime Store.)
Kinji Ninomiya is determined to become a rich NEET and by investing into a real estate empire becomes wealthy without ever having to work. A portal suddenly transports him to the world of Amuria populated by demi-humans. Here the Age of Heroes is over and the dungeons they once explored are mined by modern corporations for the ore Demonite. Kinji is forced to become a miner but soon incurs enormous debts. He befriends Wanibe, a crocodile demi-human and volunteers to prospect deeper in the dungeon where monsters are more dangerous but Demonite is plentiful. He reveals to Wanibe he discovered a secret entrance to the third level. They are attacked by a dragon-girl named Rim, but Kinji makes a deal with her, promising that if she guards them while they dig he will provide tastier food. They begin making huge profits, but Kinji despairs as his money goes toward feeding Rim and his debts actually increase. Kinji discovers a magician's staff left behind by a dead hero and uses it to hypnotise other miners into mining for him. Eventually the staff breaks, the miners awaken and Kinji is severely punished. With no money to feed Rim she threatens to eat Kinji.
2	"An Un-ANT-icipated Encounter"; Transliteration: "Arienai Tatakai" (Japanese: アリえない戦い)	Mirai Minato	Deko Akao	Mizuka Saitō	July 16, 2021
Kinji and Wanibe are transferred to a dangerous exploration team. Wanibe is injured so Kinji is forced to do his share of the work while also having his pay reduced. This leaves him with no money as he must still feed Rim. A swarm of monster ants overruns the mine and to survive Kinji uses a transformation potion to turn himself, an elite warrior and an equipment manager into ants but ends up trapped when their boss seals the mine. Kinji realizes while transformed he can understand the ants language and introduces the concept of workers' rights to the worker ants, forming a union to demand the Ant Queen treat them better. It is revealed the Ant Queen decided to expand her colony into the mine after Rim disappeared and stopped eating her workers. Kinji confronts the Queen with her workers' demands, but she decides to simply kill and replace them. Rim appears, having grown hungry, so Kinji gives her his dinner. The Queen is impressed Kinji can control Rim, who has preyed on her colony for years. Wanibe returns to work where Kinji reveals with Rim, the Ant Queen and her colony he plans to take over the Raiza'ha Mining Corporation and form his own Dungeon Black Company.
3	"Fun at the Corporate Training Trip"; Transliteration: "Tanoshii Bokura no Shain Kenshū" (Japanese: 楽しい僕らの社員研修)	Yūshi Ibe	Maika Shizuhara	Yūshi Ibe	July 23, 2021
Shia, a modern Hero employed by Raiza'ha Corporation, locates a Philosopher's stone in a dungeon and is asked to join Exploration Group 3. On an island containing a corporate training centre Kinji and Wanibe are forced to endure brutal physical exercise, psychological abuse and magical brainwashing to increase loyalty to Raiza'ha. Kinji snaps Wanibe out of being brainwashed and reveals he knew about the brainwashing the whole time and used mind altering plants to resist and plan revenge. By drugging the brainwashing sorcerers with the mind altering plants they set of fire spells, exploding the island, the training centre and all the instructors. Believing they are successfully brainwashed the corporation sends Kinji and Wanibe to Group 3 where Shia becomes their supervisor. Kinji tries to point out Raiza'ha's exploitation but Shia, who is totally loyal, forces him to accompany her into the dungeon to fight monsters. When Shia tries to kill Ant A, Kinji's favourite ant, he summons Rim to protect him. With Shia captured Kinji forces her to pose for photographs incriminating her as being friends with Rim and the Ant Queen. Using the photographs Kinji blackmails Shia into secretly working for his Dungeon Black Company.
4	"Crazy Death March"; Transliteration: "Kureijī Desu Māchi" (Japanese: クレイジー・デスマーチ)	Yūshi Ibe	Inaho Fujio	Hiroshi Yoneda	July 30, 2021
Kinji is told to repay 5 million gold within a month. Shia shows Kinji monster parts can be valuable, so Kinji hatches a plan. Belza, Raiza'ha's Director, reveals Death March is approaching, when all demonite and monsters regenerate, which is massively profitable. Kinji builds a farm to harvest monster parts without killing them and pays the 5 million. Belza reveals Death March includes the resurrection of a Majin, but this requires the sacrifice of a hero like Shia. Majin attacks Shia so Kinji throws a magic crystal at it, teleporting Majin to the surface where it destroys the mine. As Majin tunnels back into the dungeon Kinji has the ants set traps. Shia insists on fighting so Kinji scolds her for putting herself at risk trying to escape the reputation of her father, the King of Failed Adventures. Realising he is right and she doesn't have to outdo her father she decides to live for herself and kills Majin but destroys her sword. Majin revives and tries to eat Kinji, but Rim senses this, saves Kinji and eats Majin. Rim reveals something about Majin's resurrection was unnatural. A teleportation circle Kinji recognizes as the one that summoned him from Japan opens up and he and Rim fall in.
5	"Transfer"	Misaki Nishimoto	Deko Akao	Hiromitsu Kanazawa	August 6, 2021
Kinji awakens and meets Ranga, the cross-dressing male priestess who summoned him, and Zazel, fanatical leader of an underground human village living in a city created thousands of years ago by the advanced Calonian civilisation. Zazel reveals 300 years previously an evil corporation took over the world and threatens Kinji into defeating them. Kinji realizes he is actually in Amuria 300 years in the future and the evil corporation is Raiza'ha. Arriving at a castle Kinji learns it belongs to Demon Lord Belza's deputy, General Ant, whom Kinji realizes is actually his friend Ant A, who has evolved into a powerful monster and is overjoyed to see Kinji. It is revealed that, far from exploiting humans, General Ant treats them fairly, asking only that they work 40 hours a week while providing holidays and health insurance, the problem is humans of the future are unreasonably lazy and believe 40 hours is too much work. Belza has not run the corporation in years and General Ant doesn't know what to do. Deciding to help Kinji takes over as General Ninomiya, punishes lazy workers and rewards hard workers, making the company profitable again and also takes over the underground city, replacing Zazel as leader and forcing the citizens to return to work.
6	"There is strong shadow where there is much light."	Masamune Hirata	Deko Akao	Shin'ichi Watanabe	August 13, 2021
Generals Rou Gine, Power Ash and Zechs Haller see Kinji as a threat. Power tricks Kinji into a worm monster ambush that fails when Rim defeats the worms. Rou makes Kinji responsible for turning difficult wasteland into farms but Kinji has the worms cultivate the land easily. Zechs finds out a secret about Ranga and attempts to blackmail her but becomes overcome with lust despite learning she is biologically male. The three decide to put Kinji in charge of a truly impossible mission. Ranga wakes up in a version of Alice in Wonderland where white rabbits are slaves to the Queen while unemployed moles live in internet cafés. Queen Belza arrives and reveals Ranga's secret is she is Belza's descendant and offers to let Ranga live with her carefree. A Kinji white rabbit tries to get Ranga to agree, but real Kinji appears and awakens Ranga with a headbutt. It is revealed the generals sent them on a mission to defeat a robot that hypnotized Ranga but is now destroyed by Rim. Kinji assures Ranga it is good she has her own goals separate from Belza. Having defeated the robot Kinji is invited to meet the Demon Lord who surprises Kinji by asking him to save the world.
7	"Return to Work"	Takahiro Nakatsugawa; Ryūta Imaizumi	Deko Akao	Gōichi Iwahata	August 20, 2021
The Demon Lord is the resurrected Majin, Rim's twin sister. She explains the Calonian civilisation created dungeons and Guardians like Rim to manage the flow of magic throughout the planet, but when Rim met Kinji and abandoned her dungeon Raiza'ha was able mine all the way to the bottom and use the advanced technology of the Calonian city beneath it to take over the world. Majin temporarily defeated Raiza'ha and became Demon Lord, but Raiza'ha has returned, having turned their corporate slaves into robots to defeat Majin and turn the planet into a dystopia empty of biological life. Thus she offers Kinji a choice; return to Japan or go back in time and stop Raiza'ha in the past. Kinji chooses to go back in time where as a Raiza'ha employee Belza fines him 10 million gold for going missing for a month, forcing him, Rim, Ranga and Wanibe to move into Shia's flat where Kinji explains his plan, to get to the bottom of the dungeon and reach the Calonian city before Belza so he can capture their technology and take over the world first instead of Belza.
8	"Weapon of Mass Hysteria"; Transliteration: "Kyōki-teki na Heiki" (Japanese: 狂気的な兵器)	Yūshi Ibe	Maika Shizuhara	Yūshi Ibe	August 27, 2021
Kinji learns the dungeon has become much more dangerous. Shia decides to put him through extreme training during which he learns living beings can absorb natural mana and convert it into magic to boost physical abilities, something he cannot do as he is from a world without mana. Kinji sees Ranga playing with a broken gun he brought from the future, but when Rem tries to eat it, the gun absorbs her mana and requests a password to activate, which Kinji accidentally gets right by jokingly suggesting the commonly used keyboard password QWERTY. Realizing he now has a powerful weapon to compensate his physical weakness Kinji takes everyone back to the dungeon to catch up with Belza's adventurers. Kinji uses the gun to kill several monsters but the battery drains quickly and begins to drain mana from the environment to recharge, including the magic fibres woven into their clothing, leaving everyone almost naked. After being punished by Shia, Kinji threatens to get rid of the gun, only to realize the gun has a stalker girlfriend personality and is forced to keep it when it threatens to self-destruct and kill everyone if he tries to get rid of it.
9	"Silent Fortress"; Transliteration: "Shizuka na Toride" (Japanese: 静かな砦)	Yūshi Ibe; Yamato Ōuchi	Deko Akao	Shin Matsuo	September 3, 2021
They team up with other adventurers made naked by Kinji's pistol. Zombies attack and Kinji disappears, leaving his underpants as a clue. Rim follows the scent to a concealed room where the zombies are used as slave labour to brew potions illegally, kept hypnotised by an enchanted poster of workplace rules. Ranga smashes the poster, returning the zombies to normal. They follow Kinji's scent and find him tormenting an undead mage, who explains hundreds of years ago his reputation was ruined by a hero so he was forced into dungeon mining until he died of exhaustion. He now haunts the dungeon and brainwashes adventurers to work themselves to death as revenge. Kinji reveals Raiza'ha's concept of "corporate drones", causing the mage to pass to the afterlife as adventurers are already working themselves to death. Kinji meets a young struggling shop manager in the dungeon, Cindy, and makes her a deal, if he can fill her shop with paying customers she will sell him her best dungeon equipment at a massive discount. As the potions made by the zombies have no actual effect Kinji promotes them as a pre-battle nutrient drink for massive profit but are soon shut down by Raiza'ha. Confident Cindy can now survive on her own Kinji and the others set off to the next level.
10	"New Dungeon Paradise"; Transliteration: "Nyū Danjon Paradaisu" (Japanese: ニュー・ダンジョン・パラダイス)	Yamato Ōuchi; Mirai Minato	Maika Shizuhara	Kubo Shiba	September 10, 2021
Rim dreams of a girl with horns. Kinji saves maintenance workers who explain the doors to the fifth and third floors are both blocked so they are now stuck on the fourth floor indefinitely while Belza's bodyguards are now trapped on the fifth floor which has only two powerful monsters guarding the door to the sixth floor. The Ant Queen arrives having fled with her colony from earthquakes, and she has the horned girl who turns out to be Majin. Queen explains Majin was born after Rim left the dungeon to be its new guardian, but now she is unwell so the dungeon is more dangerous. Rim reacts unusually by hunting food for Majin without eating any herself, but Majin reacts violently which upsets Rim. She explains to Kinji she feels guilty for defeating Majin, causing Majin to be too weak to manage the dungeon. Kinji and the others return the fourth floors ecosystem to normal through forestry and animal husbandry while Rim looks after Majin. With the fourth floor back to normal Majin recovers and is given the name Sky by Rim. Sky suddenly falls seriously ill as the door to the fifth floor opens and the two monsters multiply into dozens and overwhelm the bodyguards.
11	"Crash EvolutiOn"	Misaki Nishimoto	Deko Akao	Kubo Shiba	September 17, 2021
Kinji manages to save the bodyguards while Rim defeats the monsters. They locate floor six, where Kinji reveals he secretly scouted ahead with his pistol, who gave him information on a magical artifact Kinji now claims for himself, giving him the power to command all dungeons. Leading an army of the monster guards aboveground he confronts Belza with enough jewels from the dungeon to clear his debts that quits his job. Three months later Kinji has turned the dungeon into a theme park with Ranga as his assistant and begins buying other abandoned dungeons. Using his powers he is able to manage the dungeons magic without Rim or Majin, turning them back into profitable mines run by the Ant Queen. Shia starts a new career. Kinji crashes Raiza'ha's profits by flooding the market with cheap demonite and putting Cindy in charge of a magazine based delivery service on adventuring equipment which, thanks to Wanibe performing demonite research, are cheaper and higher in quality than anything Raiza'ha sells. He also ends discrimination against demi-humans by employing them with the same rights as humans. Belza becomes an alcoholic and is tormented by Ranga who, as her descendant, knows Belza's childhood history. Belza suddenly invents a plan to get revenge on Kinji using Shia.
12	"GoOd Day,goodbye"	Mirai Minato	Deko Akao	Mirai Minato	September 24, 2021
Kinji is arrested for crimes he committed before becoming rich with Belza manipulating Shia into testifying against him. Portrayed as a potential threat to humanity Kinji is tortured to extract a confession, but he resists. Shia visits and heals his wounds, having realised Belza manipulated her. The Ant Queen remembers Kinji wrote a manual for this kind of emergency. A month later Belza is made Raiza'ha's Director but is shocked when Kinji is suddenly released and made CEO. Wanibe reveals that following Kinji's manual, they purchased 40% of all Raiza'ha stocks and convinced the owners of another 15% to support them, giving them a majority ownership of Raiza'ha. Raiza'ha is absorbed into Kinji's company where he makes Belza work with Ranga to improve their family relationship. Despite his victory Kinji finds he is unhappy. Concerned about his behaviour Ranga reveals that Kinji is from Japan and may be planning to return. Kinji confirms he was happier chasing a goal than he is now he has won, but instead of returning to Japan he plans to expand the company, take over dungeons in other countries and keep going until he controls the entire world.
