= Sakura Miko =

Japanese Virtual YouTuber

- さくらみこ
- Current design of Sakura Miko by Ordan
- Other name: Mikochi
- Occupation: VTuber
- Years active: 2018–present

YouTube information
- Channel: Miko Ch. さくらみこ
- Genres: Livestreaming, singing, gaming
- Subscribers: 2.45 million
- Views: 1.04 billion
- Last updated: August 29, 2026

Sakura Miko (Japanese: さくらみこ) is a Japanese virtual YouTuber (VTuber) affiliated with Hololive Production. She is part of Hololive (Japan) Generation 0 alongside Tokino Sora, AZKi, Roboco-san, and Hoshimachi Suisei. She debuted on August 1, 2018, and has amassed over 2 million subscribers on YouTube.

== Career ==
Sakura Miko debuted on August 1, 2018. Her character was designed by the animator Yuichi Tanaka, known for his work on the anime A Certain Scientific Railgun. She started being a VTuber—an online entertainer who uses a virtual avatar generated using computer graphics—because she saw Tokino Sora and Kizuna Ai. She initially debuted as part of "Sakura Miko Project", separate from Cover Corporation's Hololive Production, though she was placegrouped into Hololive Production a few months later in December 2018. She and other Hololive members who debuted individually were eventually grouped as the Hololive 0th generation. She proclaims herself as "Elite Shrine Maiden" (エリート巫女) on stream.

Early in her career in Hololive in May 2020, she streamed herself playing Grand Theft Auto V. Her unique reactions garnered attention from overseas viewers, who began to clip and translate her streams. Sakura Miko attributes the Grand Theft Auto series for giving her the confidence to come out of her shell, calling it her "soul game". She would return to the series often, including organizing a highly-acclaimed company-wide "Hololive GTA" project with genmate Hoshimachi Suisei in September 2024.

She took a three-month break in July 2020 due to poor health. She reached 1 million subscribers in April 2021, being 14th in Hololive to do so. In 2022, in a survey conducted by the app "Simeji", Sakura Miko ranked eighth on the "Top 10 Favorite VTubers chosen by Gen Z".

In January 2023, she and Usada Pekora collaborated on the song "Mosh Race". In February, the Tokyo Metropolitan Government appointed Sakura Miko as one of the 16 Tokyo Tourism Ambassadors.

In March 2024, she released her song "Kyun Kyun Miko Kyun", written by the Vocaloid producer Kinoshita. In April, she released her song "Nyahello World" to celebrate hitting 2 million subscribers on YouTube, the sixth in the Hololive to do so. In September, she released her first full album, flower rhapsody, which talks about her "true self" and "feelings for you". In October, she charted 21st in Billboard Japan's Artist 100. In December, Sakura Miko was featured as examples in the research paper "Structural stability and thermodynamics of artistic composition" published in the PNAS journal.

She became the top three most watched streamer for January 2025 with 5.13 million hours of watch time according to Stream Charts.

== Personal life ==
She grew up in Chiba Prefecture. In an interview with The Nikkei, she said that she wanted to become a nursery teacher. She is a big fan of bishōjo games and eroge, even accidentally showing one on her stream. As a result, she had the opportunity to work with various games of these genres, such as singing the opening and ending theme to Ai Kiss 2. She said that she likes taiyaki, and has repeatedly collaborated with the Naruto Taiyaki Honpo chain.

== Works ==
=== Albums ===
Title	Album details	Peak ranking					Refs
Title	Album details	JPN	JPN Comb.	JPN Dig.	JPN Hot	JPN DL	Refs
Flower Rhapsody	Released: 25 September 2024; Label: Cover Corp; Formats: CD, digital download, streaming	4	5	4	6	4	
Blooming Cinderella	Released: 14 October 2026; Label: Hololive Records; Formats: CD, digital download, streaming	6	7	2	22	3	

=== Extended plays ===
Title	Details	Peak ranking		Refs
Title	Details	JPN Dig.	JPN DL	Refs
Yamato Phantasia (ヤマトファンタジア) (with Nakiri Ayame, Shirakami Fubuki, and Ookami Mio)	Released: 16 July 2023; Label: Cover Corp; Formats: Digital download, streaming	6	32	
Heart Connect	Released: 2 August 2023; Label: Cover Corp; Formats: Digital download, streaming	7	—	
Scrap & Build! (with Shiranui Flare, Hoshimachi Suisei, Omaru Polka, and Shirogane Noel)	Released: 8 June 2024; Label: Cover Corp; Formats: Digital download, streaming	—	—	

=== Singles ===
==== As lead artist ====
Title	Year	Peak chart positions		Album	Refs
Title	Year	JPN Dig.	JPN DL	Album	Refs
"My Name Is Elite☆"	2019	—	—	Non-album single	
"Sakurakaze"	2020	45	—	Non-album single	
"Sakura-iro Haitenshon!" (さくら色ハイテンション!)	2021	—	85	Non-album single	
"Kagetsu no Yume" (花月ノ夢)	2021	—	33	Non-album single	
"Baby Dance" (ベイビーダンス)	2022	—	53	heart♡connect	
"Our and Your Song" (僕らと君のうた。)	2022	—	45	heart♡connect	
"Otome No Susume♡!" (乙女のススメ?!)	2023	—	52	heart♡connect	
"Heart Online" (ハートオンライン)	2023	45	33	heart♡connect	
"Kyun Kyun MIKO Kyun kyun♡" (きゅんきゅんみこきゅんきゅん?)	2024	—	68	flower rhapsody	
"Nya-Hello World!!!" (にゃっはろーわーるど!!!)	2024	—	68	flower rhapsody	
"Sakura Day's"	2024	—	—	flower rhapsody	
"DAI DAI DAI Fantasista" (DAI DAI DAI ファンタジスタ)	2024	—	80	flower rhapsody	
"ikenie" (イケ贄)	2024	—	—	flower rhapsody	
"Cherry Message"	2024	—	—	flower rhapsody	
"Sakihokore Aidoru" (咲き誇れアイドル)	2025	—	79	Blooming Cinderella	
"Fashion Beat" (ファッションビート)	2026	—	38	Blooming Cinderella	
"Sakimidare Apparade" (サキミダレアッパレード♪)	2026	—	96	Blooming Cinderella	
"Sakuraful March"	2026	—	—	Blooming Cinderella	

==== As collaborative artist ====
Title	Year	Peak chart positions		Album
Title	Year	JPN Dig.	JPN DL	Album
"Pekomiko Daisensou!!" (ぺこみこ大戦争！！) (Note: Collaboration song with Wacca) (with Usada Pekora)	2020	—	34	Non-album single
"Gimme Ginmi virtual Saiko star!!!!" (Gimme吟味virtuaる最高star！！！！) (Note: Theme song for the 2nd anniversary of the Nintendo Switch version of Groove Coaster: Wai Wai Party. Released under the sasakuration label) (with Shirakami Fubuki, Natsuiro Matsuri, Houshou Marine)	2021	—	—	Non-album single
Mikkorone×Showtime!! (みっころね×しょうたいむ‼︎) (with Inugami Korone)	2022	—	18	Non-album single
Happy☆Fever! hololive (ハッピー☆フィーバー！ホロライブ) (with Oozora Subaru and Ookami Mio as hololive Sports Festival Committee)	2022	—	83	Non-album single
"Mosh Race" (モッシュレース) (with Usada Pekora)	2023	26	31	holo*27 Originals Vol.1
"Dodekambitious" (with Oozora Subaru, Usada Pekora and Nekomata Okayu)	2023	—	—	Non-album singles
"Sugar Rush" (シュガーラッシュ) (with Hoshimachi Suisei as MiComet)	2023	—	13	Non-album singles
"Hajimari no Mahou (Charm)" (はじまりの魔法-charm-) (with Amane Kanata, Himemori Luna, Houshou Marine, Murasaki Shion, and Sakamata Chloe as Magical Girl HoloWitches!)	2024	—	90	Non-album singles
"On Your Side" (with Amane Kanata, Himemori Luna, Houshou Marine, Murasaki Shion, and Sakamata Chloe as Magical Girl HoloWitches!)	2024	—	—	Non-album singles
"Mikkorone × Yatteyanyo!!" (みっころね×やってやんよ!!) (with Inugami Korone)	2024	—	—	Non-album singles
"Lollipop" (with Hoshimachi Suisei as miComet)	2025	18	19	Non-album singles
"faint sunset" (微かな夕陽) (with Amane Kanata, Himemori Luna, Houshou Marine, Shirakami Fubuki, and Yukihana Lamy as Magical Girl holoWitches!)	2025	—	—	Non-album singles
"Necchu Syndrome" (ねっちゅーシンドローム) (with Amane Kanata, Himemori Luna, Houshou Marine, Shirakami Fubuki, and Yukihana Lamy as Magical Girl holoWitches!)	2025	—	—	Non-album singles

=== Other charted songs ===
Title	Year	Peak chart positions	Album
Title	Year	JPN DL	Album
"AttentionPlease!" (あてんしょんぷりーず!)	2023	41	heart♡connect
"Our Tree" (アワーツリー)	2023	63	heart♡connect

=== Video games ===
Year	Title	Role	Ref.
2019	100% Orange Juice!	Kiriko	

== Awards and nominations ==
Year	Ceremony	Category	Result	Ref.
2025	The Game Awards	Content Creator of the Year	Nominated	
