= Leo Kliesen =

Fictional character in the Tekken fighting game series

- Tekken character
- Leo Kliesen in Tekken 8 (2024)
- First game: Tekken 6 (2007)
- Created by: Katsuhiro Harada
- Voiced by: Veronica Taylor (Tekken 6); Philipp Zieschang (Tekken Tag Tournament 2 – present)

In-universe information
- Gender: Unknown
- Fighting style: Bajiquan
- Origin: Germany
- Nationality: German

Leo Kliesen (Japanese: レオ・クリーゼン, Hepburn: Reo Kurīzen) is a character from the Tekken fighting game franchise by Bandai Namco Entertainment. First appearing in Tekken 6, Leo fights using Bajiquan, and have since appeared in every subsequent title in the series as well as the related manga, Tekken Comic. A young German child of a spelunker father and a corporate executive mother, Leo seeks to solve their mother's murder. Created by series producer Katsuhiro Harada, Leo's gender is officially unknown, and the character was intended to appeal to both male and female audiences. Harada has said that Leo is not non-binary, stating that the character "would not want to be categorized as such." Originally voiced by Veronica Taylor, in later installments Leo is voiced in German by Philipp Zieschang.

Scholarly works have observed how players have reacted to the character due to their undisclosed gender status, and what this entailed in light of gender signifiers in fighting games amongst playable characters. While Leo is neither non-binary nor transgender, some have discussed how the character can be read as such. Leo has also been cited as a positive example of how to approach LGBTQ characters, seen as a subversion of both common tropes in games involving such characters as well as gender performance as a whole.

== Conception and design ==
Leo was created by series producer Katsuhiro Harada for Tekken 6, who asked the development team to create a female German playable character. However, when he saw the submitted designs, he felt the character could be popular with both men and women, and focused on making a "cool" character that could be loved regardless of gender. According to game director Yuichi Yonemori, this caused some difficulties, particularly for the voice actors for Leo as they had to try and appeal to male and female players. In an interview with 4Gamer, Harada stated that the character's name was a shortened version of their real name, though refused to state what it was. He further noted that while Tekken was a popular series, their characters were seldom featured in fan works. However, after the release of Tekken 6, he noticed that alongside the character's high usage rate amongst players, Leo featured significantly in fan art and doujins, something he felt made the character "really valuable" to the Tekken franchise.

Despite the stated ambiguity regarding Leo's gender, the artbook included the character's concept art under the "male" section. Things were further confused when a video surfaced of a 2011 Namco Bandai event, where it appeared the character was stated to be female and that their first name was "Eleonore". In the 4Gamer interview, Harada explained that the statement was meant to be for the crowd's ears only and was surprised at how far it spread. Harada later clarified in a 2012 interview at the Osaka Tekken Museum that the video was only a part of a longer statement: Eleonore was only the first draft of the character, and Leo's gender was officially "unknown", a statement Yonemori echoed. Harada in turn noted that localizations of the games sometimes made expressing this difficult, as details would sometimes get lost in translation between regions. Harada reiterated many of these statements on social media platform Twitter when asked about the character. When a user inquired if Leo was non-binary, Harada said no, stating "Leo would not want to be categorized as such. In any case, it doesn't matter, right? Leo is Leo".

Leo is a slender person with short blonde hair, and an ahoge sticking up in the center. Their default outfit consists of a black shirt with several straps, and a red, white, and black jacket atop it. Red and black gloves cover their hands and wrists, while a red tied scarf covers their neck. A pair of jeans covers Leo's legs, with brown shinguard boots. A brown pouch hangs from the right side of their belt, while a holster is strapped to that thigh. This outfit persisted until Tekken 8, where their attire was changed to a white strapped shirt, a red coat with many trailing straps, a harness around their hips and pelvis, and the removal of the scarf in place of a black cloth tied around their right arm. Leo has had several alternate outfits throughout the series, including a Chinese-themed martial arts outfit. During development of Tekken 6, several other designs were considered for the character, including a painter outfit with overalls, and a similar one that would have had lion themed accessories including a tail, with stylized text of their name on their belt and left sleeve.

== Appearances ==
In games such as Tekken Tag Tournament 2 titles, Leo can equip customization options regardless of gender, such as male and female swimsuits.

Introduced in Tekken 6, Leo Kliesen is a Bajiquan practitioner from Germany whose father, Niklas was a world-famous spelunker who vanished when Leo was young, while their mother, Emma was an executive for G Corporation, a major company in the Tekken universe. After their mother is murdered and the police abruptly call off the investigation, Leo investigates on their own. The investigation leads to G Corporation's leader Kazuya Mishima, and Leo enters his tournament in order to face him and get answers. In Tekken Tag Tournament 2, and Tekken 7, Leo learns that their mother used to work for Mishima Zaibatsu before resigning to G Corporation, and was researching the "devil gene". In Tekken 8, Leo discovers that Kazuya, who has the Devil Gene, had "taken care of" all researchers, including Leo's mother. Leo briefly despairs until their father returns, encouraging the character to not give up. Leo was originally voiced by Veronica Taylor. As of Tekken Tag Tournament 2 the role was taken over by Philipp Zieschang, who voiced the character in German, though voice lines such as pain grunts were still performed by Taylor. With Tekken 8, Zieschang voiced the character solely. In addition to the aforementioned games, Leo has appeared in Tekken Tag Tournament 2, Tekken Mobile, and shmup mobile game Full Bokko Heroes X.

In terms of gameplay, the character was intended to be easy to use by both new and experienced players, utilizing short-ranged attacks as well as various elbow and shoulder strikes. Some attacks allow for a variety of combos, such as the "Rising Bei Zhe Kao", while others allow Leo to change to stances such as the "Jin Ji Du Li". Due to Leo's gender ambiguity, the character can be customized to use both male and female-specific clothing and weapons. In Tekken 8, Leo was given a new "Rage Art" move, a super attack that was introduced in Tekken 7 and can be used once when the player is below a quarter health. In it, Leo knocks the opponent back before utilizing a grappling hook to swing into them with their shoulder.

Outside of video games, Leo appears in the manga Tekken Comic, a retelling of the events leading up to Tekken 6, written by Rui Takato and published online as part of a collaboration between Bandai Namco and Ultra Jump. In it, Leo acts as Lili de Rochefort's bodyguard, though does so under the pretense of being named eventual heir to Lili's oil company. Along the way, Leo befriend Asuka Kazama. After Lili's company is bought out by Jin Kazama's corporation, Leo at first attempts to quit, but after aggressive coercion on Lili's part, helps the girls attack Jin directly to try and get it back.

== Critical reception ==
The paper "An Analysis of Gender and Sexuality Performance in Digital Games" in the journal DiGeSt cited Leo as an example of how "non-binary gender performance in digital games can be subversive". Emphasizing the character's "genderqueer" appearance, the authors noted that their attacks had a "possesses the kind of grace typically associated with female characters in the series". They further praised the fact that Leo's presentation was never "problematic", something uncommon in Japanese media in their eyes, where they felt such characters were typically used mainly for comic relief. The book Queerness in Play meanwhile cited Leo as an example of representing a genderless "butch" archetype, though noted beyond that the character represented stereotypes associated with their country, and argued their role in a fighting game as a playable character afforded them a "privileged relational status" as any other character in the title, downplaying their ambiguity.

Clemson University lecturer D. Leland Fecher shared similar observations in a paper for Reconstruction: Studies in Contemporary Culture, examining the handling of gender in the Tekken franchise. He cited that while Leo's speed and fighting style fit female characters in the franchise, the strength of the attacks was more typical of male characters, and coupled with Leo's average height added to the ambiguity regarding Leo's gender and how one could perceive it. However, Fecher noticed that this also caused uncertainty in players, leaving them uncomfortable rather than embracing it as a progressive move on the part of the developers. He cited players posting to blogs and message boards that when discussing the character acknowledged Leo's gender ambiguity as an aspect of the character, but then questioned if the character was male or female directly afterward. Fecher observed that some players also made derogatory comments towards the character if they considered Leo to be male. He stated his observations were not meant to paint players in a negative light, but instead observe how they reacted when an anomaly such as an ambiguous character was inserted in a game series that had to that point defined clear gender identifiers amongst the cast, and hoped developers could learn from such reactions when implementing such characters in future games.

Ruchi Kher Jaggi, in a paper for the Mass Communicator, wrote that Leo was rarely used in mature content and that there were complaints due to the perception that Leo may be transgender. Tom Goulter of GamesRadar+ commented briefly on the character's use in such media, stating that after Harada's statements regarding the character, Leo saw increased appearances on "dodgy fan-art sites all over the Internet" due to the implied "newly-announced femaleness". Stacey Henley, in an article for VG247, acknowledged that while the character's gender status was ambiguous, Leo could be read as male-presenting transgender by audiences, and helped emphasize in Henley's eyes how few well-handled female-presenting transgender characters there were in major gaming titles in comparison to their counterparts.
