= Hoshimachi Suisei =

Hololive Japanese VTuber and singer

Hoshimachi Suisei 星街すいせい
- Hoshimachi Suisei as designed by Teshima Nari

Background information
- Occupations: Singer; VTuber
- Years active: 2018–present
- Labels: Cover; Sony Japan; Toy's Factory; Studio Stellar; Mastersix; VIA; Echoes
- Member of: Hololive Idol Project; Midnight Grand Orchestra

YouTube information
- Channel: Suisei Channel
- Years active: 2018–present
- Genres: Livestreaming; Singing; Gaming
- Subscribers: 2.91 million
- Views: 1.78 billion
- Last updated: 10 September 2026
- Website: hoshimachi-suisei.jp

Hoshimachi Suisei (Japanese: 星街すいせい) is a Japanese singer, songwriter, and virtual YouTuber. She began posting videos as an independent creator in March 2018. In May 2019, she became affiliated with Hololive Production through their newly created music label, INoNaKa Music, before joining the agency's main branch later the same year. Her YouTube activity consists primarily of live streaming herself singing karaoke, playing video games, talking to her fans, or collaborating with other talents. She is particularly well known among fans for her skill at Tetris and her singing ability. As of September 2026, she has 2.91 million subscribers and 1.78 billion views on YouTube.

As a singer, she has released three studio albums, as well as two extended plays under her side project Midnight Grand Orchestra with producer Taku Inoue, all of which have debuted within the top ten on the Oricon Albums Chart. Outside of her streaming and musical activity, she has appeared on Japanese television and radio programs as a virtual personality. On 1 February 2025, she performed at the Nippon Budokan, fulfilling a career-long goal.

== Career ==
Hoshimachi's YouTube activity consists primarily of live streaming herself singing, playing video games, talking to her fans, or collaborating with other talents. Her work as a music artist includes performing in live concerts, singing and writing lyrics for her own singles and albums, and contributing as the singer for Midnight Grand Orchestra. Hoshimachi also appears on radio programs, including ones hosted by her, and television programs. Additionally, she has created illustrations for hers and other VTubers' channels, and has worked as a video editor for VTubers from Re:AcT and Hololive.

=== 2018–2019: Independent VTuber ===
Hoshimachi Suisei created her YouTube channel on 18 March 2018 and revealed her initial character design and model, illustrated and rigged by herself, on Twitter that same day. She posted her first video to YouTube on 22 March 2018, debuting as an independent virtual YouTuber and self-proclaimed idol. She joined the VTuber group S:gnal on 2 July 2018, but left a month later on 4 August. She released her first original song, "Comet", on 22 November 2018, and her second song, "Her Trail on the Celestial Sphere" (天球、彗星は夜を跨いで, Tenkyū, Suisei wa Yoru o Mataide), on 22 March 2019, both as YouTube music videos.

=== 2019–2025: Hololive Production and career expansions ===
On 19 May 2019, Hoshimachi joined Hololive Productions via INoNaKa Music (イノナカミュージック), its newly created music label, with VTuber AZKi. She announced on Twitter on 28 November 2019 that she would be transferring to the all-female Hololive agency. Cover Corp., Hololive's parent company, also officially announced the transfer on 29 November, to be carried out on 1 December. Hoshimachi also received a new Live2D model built by Live2D animator rariemonn based on an updated character design by Teshima Nari.

In October 2019, Hoshimachi started live streaming on Bilibili. After her 3D model's debut concert on 1 March 2020, her popularity on the site grew tremendously. This stream garnered over tens of thousands of live viewers on bilibili. On 17 March 2020, her number of jiànzhǎng (舰长, or "captains", viewers who donate over ¥198 to a particular streamer every month), surpassed 1,000, over 700 of whom joined during the aforementioned concert. She was the fourth streamer and first VTuber on the platform to reach that milestone.

Hoshimachi performed in the "Hololive 1st fes. Nonstop Story" concert at the Toyosu PIT on 24 January 2020 with every member of Hololive at that time. She reached the 100,000 subscriber milestone on YouTube on 31 January 2020. On 1 March 2020, Hoshimachi debuted her 3D model, created by Yatsurugi. This stream was watched by 55,000 live viewers and its associated Twitter hashtag was at one point the top trending hashtag in the world.

On 22 March 2020, Hoshimachi released her first single under Cover Corp., "Next Color Planet", which ranked 5th in the Oricon daily digital single ranking on the day of its release.

On 13 April 2021, Hoshimachi released her next digital single "Ghost", which ranked 1st on Oricon daily digital single ranking, also reaching 1st on other digital single charts such as iTunes Japan, Amazon Music Japan, and Mora. "Ghost" also became the first VTuber-produced song to remain in Oricon's daily single ranking for two days in a row, reaching No. 4 on 15 April, as well as the first VTuber-produced song to chart in Oricon's weekly single ranking, reaching No. 11. The song also charted on Billboard Japan's weekly ranking of downloadable songs, reaching No. 5 for the week of 12 to 18 April.

On 26 June 2021, Hoshimachi's YouTube channel reached 1 million subscribers.

In the summer of 2021, Hoshimachi announced a series of three back-to-back monthly digital extended play releases, starting with Bluerose / Comet on 25 June. On 8 July, she released Run / Her Trail on the Celestial Sphere (駆けろ / 天球、彗星は夜を跨いで, Kakero / Tenkyū, Suisei wa Yoru o Mataide) On 21 August, she released SelfishDazzling / Bye Bye Rainy (自分勝手Dazzling / バイバイレイニー, Jibun Katte Dazzling / Bye Bye Rainy), featuring a song which she had previously uploaded on 16 August as part of a collaboration with the rhythm game Chunithm.

On 29 September 2021, Hoshimachi released her first album, Still Still Stellar, which she had announced in July that year. Her album charted 5th place on the Oricon Daily Album Ranking, becoming the best-ever performing solo VTuber album.

On 21 October 2021, Hoshimachi performed her first paid concert, "STELLAR into the GALAXY", at Tokyo's Toyosu PIT with streaming on SPWN, featuring NIJISANJI VTuber Inui Toko and fellow Hololive member AZKi as guests.

On 31 March 2022, Hoshimachi Suisei collaborated with the composer Taku Inoue to start the project Midnight Grand Orchestra under the label Toy's Factory. Their first single, "SOS", was released shortly on 13 April, along with an accompanying YouTube music video on the project's new channel. Midnight Grand Orchestra later announced its first album, featuring 7 songs, including "SOS", on 28 April of that year. It was released on 27 July 2022, and the group performed in a SPWN-streamed concert mixing virtual and real elements and featuring a live band on 20 August.

On 20 January 2023, Hoshimachi appeared on the YouTube channel The First Take, becoming the first VTuber to perform on the popular channel. Her one-take version of "Stellar Stellar" quickly exceeded 5 million views and broke the channel's premiere live viewership record.

On 25 January 2023, Hoshimachi's second full-length album, Specter, was released, after having been announced in November of the previous year, along with her second paid concert, "Shout in Crisis", which she performed live at Tokyo Garden Theatre, with streaming on SPWN and ZAIKO, on 28 January.

On 27 September 2023, Hoshimachi's YouTube channel reached 2 million subscribers, become the fifth member of Hololive to do so.

On 7 April 2024, the music video for Hoshimachi's new single "Bibbidiba" reached 10 million views, the fastest video to reach that view count for a VTuber. In November 2024, the music video surpassed 100 million views.

On 3 September 2024, Hoshimachi announced her first live tour, "Spectra of Nova", occurring throughout fall and winter 2024 at Saitama Super Arena, Ookini Arena Maishima, and Fukuoka Sunpalace. She announced each concert would feature a different guest: Hoshimatic Project (a hololive VTuber idol unit organised by Hoshimachi herself) on 14 November at Saitama Super Arena, KAF on 10 December at Ookini Arena Maishima, and Shiranui Constructions (another hololive sub-unit Hoshimachi is a member of) on 28 December at Fukuoka Sunpalace.

On 30 September 2024, Hoshimachi held the first-ever street performance by a VTuber on the streets of Udagawachō, Shibuya.

On 8 October 2024, it was announced Hoshimachi would perform at the final day of Countdown Japan 24/25, alongside acts including Zutomayo and Sumika. On 11 October 2024, Hoshimachi announced that she would be appearing at YouTube Fanfest 2024 alongside acts including Hajime Syacho and Hikakin.

On 1 February 2025, Hoshimachi achieved her dream of performing at the Nippon Budokan. She was named as one of Forbes Japan's 30 under 30 that year.

=== 2026–present: Establishing personal agency and major debut ===
During Suisei's eighth anniversary Youtube concert on 22 March 2026, she announced the establishment of her own personal agency Studio Stellar. The move included transferring all her solo activities including her music, streaming, fan club management, and new personal merchandise from Hololive Production to the new agency, while NERD Inc. would be responsible for Studio Stellar's talent management under a collaborative framework with Cover, who will continue to coordinate her activities as a Hololive Production talent. In a media event the next day, Hoshimachi clarified that Studio Stellar is a completely independent company, not attached to Hololive Production or Cover Corp. She also expressed her gratitude towards Cover taking her in at a time when no one else would and aims to continue sustaining her relationship with the agency, clarifying her plans to continue working as a Hololive Production talent and participate in product releases, live events and collaborations with her Hololive colleagues.

At the end of her four-stop 2026 tour "Once Upon a Stellar" on 12 November, Hoshimachi Suisei announced her major debut under Sony Music Japan's label Echoes, starting on December 9.

== Endorsements ==
She has had her music appear and been represented by an in-game character in video games including Chunithm and The Idolmaster Cinderella Girls: Starlight Stage. On 5 May 2021, she collaborated with Mawaru Penguindrum for a simultaneous viewing. On 14 December 2021, she announced a merchandise collaboration with Converse Tokyo, releasing T-shirts and acrylic keychains.

On 22 November 2022, it was announced she would be releasing the official series theme song for the game Dyschronia: Chronos Alternate, "7days", which was also featured on her album Still Still Stellar. In February 2024, her collaboration song with Honeyworks, "Kyoushitsu ni Ao", was used for a Google Pixel | au advertisement.

In April 2023, Japanese supermarket franchise Ito-Yokado announced a collaboration with Hoshimachi, partnering with the talent to produce a at-home curry making kit. 90,000 units of the collaboration products were produced, and the inventory sold out within the first day of availability.

In March 2026, Hoshimachi was announced to be part of a collaboration with Fortnite and was later released on 12 March, featuring her likeness as a playable skin and items associated with her.

== Filmography ==
=== Radio shows ===
On 5 April 2020, Hoshimachi became a radio personality with the advent of Hololive presents Hoshimachi Suisei's MUSIC SPACE (ホロライブ presents 星街すいせいのMUSIC SPACE), a weekly internet radio program for Cho A&G+ (超A&G+) of Nippon Cultural Broadcasting.

Hoshimachi appeared on Encouraging Japan with Music! (音楽で日本をアゲる), another Nippon Cultural Broadcasting radio production, on 17 June 2020, and broadcast the first live studio performance by VTubers in Japanese radio history with Mokota Mememe and Hanabasami Kyō.

On 4 April 2021, immediately after the end of MUSIC SPACE, Hoshimachi began a new radio program, Hoshimachi Suisei & Tadokoro Azusa's Parallel Scramble (星街すいせい・田所あずさ 平行線すくらんぶる), with voice actress Azusa Tadokoro, also for Cho A&G+.

Hoshimachi also appeared on other radio shows during and after the run of Parallel Scramble (which ended broadcasting after 1 October 2023), including SCHOOL OF LOCK! Music Line, and multiple appearances on VR! ~VTuber Music Radio~.

=== Television ===
Year	Title	Network	Air Dates	Ref
2020	V-on! Sakura Music Live	REALITY	19 March 2020	
2020	Te Te TV (てぇてぇTV)	BS Nippon	20 March 2020	
2020	NHK Virtual Bunkasai (NHKバーチャル文化祭)	NHK	14 August 2020	
2020	D4DJ First Mix TV	TOKYO MX, BS Nippon	2 and 9 October 2020	
2020	Numa ni Hamatte Kiitemita (沼にハマってきいてみた)	NHK Educational TV	7 December 2020	
2021, 2022	Project V (プロジェクトV)	Nippon TV, SPWN	25 August 2021, 23 February 2022	
2021	GARIBEN GIRL V	TV Asahi	14 January 2021	
2021	Chōjin Joshi Sentai Garibengā V (超人女子戦士 ガリベンガーV)	TV Asahi	14 January 2021	
2021	Oshisugite V (推しすぎてV)	SPWN	29 August 2021	
2022	Hyada×Taiiku no One Room☆Music (ヒャダ×体育のワンルーム☆ミュージック)	NHK Educational TV	13 August 2022	
2022	BUZZ RHYTHM 02 (バズリズム02)	Nippon TV	20 August 2022	
2022	Project V (プロジェクトV)	TVer, hulu	29 December 2022	
2023	Music-ru TV	TV Asahi	13 February 2023	
2023	Entertainment! District ~The e-World that Television Doesn't Know~	RKB Mainichi Broadcasting	7 June 2023	
2023	THE MUSIC DAY 2023	Nippon TV	1 July 2023	
2023	Buzz Rhythm 02	Nippon TV	11 August 2023	
2024	New TV	NHK General TV	9 January 2024	
2024	Music-ru TV	TV Asahi	20 May 2024	
2024	THE MUSIC DAY 2024	Nippon TV	29 June 2024	
2024	CDTV Live! Live	TBS TV	7 October 2024	

== Concerts and tours ==
Indicates appearance through live streaming

Event	Dates	Venue/Network	City	Country	Ref(s)
The Shitest Start	22 May 2019	Akihabara ENTAS	Tokyo	Japan	
INNK EXHiBiTiON	9 May 2019	Akihabara ENTAS	Tokyo	Japan	
Hololive 1st Fes. Nonstop Story (hololive 1st Fes. 「ノンストップ・ストーリー」)	24 January 2020	Toyosu PIT	Tokyo	Japan	
VTuber Oshaberi Fes (VTuberおしゃべりフェス)	16 February 2020	3331 Arts Chiyoda Taiikukan	Tokyo	Japan	
It's a Virtual Pop World!	3 July 2020	SPWN	—N/a	Japan	
Virtual Unit Fes "VILLS" (バーチャルユニットフェス「VILLS」)	19 July 2020	SPWN, Bilibili (Note: Chinese Area only)	—N/a	Japan	
Bilibili Macro Link 2020	25 July 2020	Bilibili	—N/a	China	
BilibiliWorld 2020	7–9 August 2020	Shanghai New International Expo Center	Shanghai	China	
Tokyo Tower Firework Festival XR: Cosmic Flower (東京タワー花火大会XR〜COSMIC FLOWER〜)	6 September 2020	YouTube, Niconico, Bilibili	—N/a	Japan	
TOKYO IDOL FESTIVAL Online 2020 (4th day)	4 October 2020	TOKYO IDOL FESTIVAL	—N/a	Japan	
SUISEI MUSIC "POWER" LIVE	22 November 2020	Nissin Power Station	—N/a	Japan	
Inui Toko 1st Solo Live "who i am"	10 December 2020	KT Zepp Yokohama	Yokohama	Japan	
Hololive 2nd fes. Beyond the Stage (2nd day) (Note: sponsored by Bushiroad)	22 December 2020)	Niconico, SPWN	—N/a	Japan	
VILLS vol.2	21 March 2021	SPWN	—N/a	Japan	
V-Carnival (Day 1)	3 April 2021	SPWN	—N/a	Japan	
TUBEOUT! Vol.10	31 July 2021	SPWN	—N/a	Japan	
Hoshimachi Suisei 1st Solo Live "STELLAR into the GALAXY" (Note: co-sponsored by Bushiroad)	21 October 2021	Toyosu PIT, SPWN	Tokyo	Japan	
Hololive 3rd fes. Link Your Wish (1st day) (Note: co-sponsored by Weiß Schwarz and others)	19 March 2022	Makuhari Event Hall, SPWN, Niconico	Chiba	Japan	
VTuber Fes Japan 2022 (2nd day)	30 April 2022	Makuhari Messe, Niconico	Chiba	Japan	
V-Carnival vol.2 (2nd day)	12 June 2022	eplus	—N/a	Japan	
Midnight Grand Orchestra 1st LIVE "OVERTURE"	20 August 2022	SPWN	—N/a	Japan	
Hoshimachi Suisei 2nd Solo Live "Shout in Crisis"	28 January 2023	Tokyo Garden Theater, SPWN/ZAIKO	Tokyo	Japan	
Hololive 4th fes. Our Bright Parade (1st and 2nd Days	18-19 March 2023	Makuhari Event Hall, SPWN	Chiba	Japan	
Hololive English 1st Concert – Connect the World (Note: as a guest appearance)	2 July 2023	YouTube Theater, SPWN	Inglewood	USA	
Buzz Rhythm LIVE V 2023	29 July 2023	SPWN	—N/a	Japan	
ASO ROCK FESTIVAL FIRE 2023	30 September 2023	Kumamoto Prefectural Outdoor Theater	Kumamoto	Japan	
Weiss Schwarz 15th Anniversary Live	2 November 2023	Tokyo Garden Theater	Tokyo	Japan	
Hoshimachi Suisei @ NYC	17 November 2023	Jacob K. Javits Convention Center)	New York City	USA	
Hololive 5th fes. Capture the Moment (2nd day)	17 March 2024	Makuhari Event Hall, SPWN	Chiba	Japan	
Hololive English 2nd Concert -Breaking Dimensions- (1st and 2nd days)	24-25 August 2024	Kings Theatre, eplus	New York City	USA	
Sakura Miko 1st Solo Live "flower fantasista!"	26 October 2024	Ariake Arena, SPWN	Tokyo	Japan	
Hoshimachi Suisei Live Tour 2024 "Spectra of Nova"	14 November, 10 December, and 28 December 2024	Saitama Super Arena, Ookini Arean Maishima, Fukuoka Sunpalace, SPWN/ZAIKO	Saitama, Osaka, Fukuoka	Japan	
YouTube Fanfest Japan 2024	11 December 2024	Makuhari Event Hall, YouTube	Chiba	Japan	
COUNTDOWN JAPAN 24/25 (4th day)	31 December 2024	Makuhari Messe	Chiba	Japan	
Hoshimachi Suisei Nippon Budokan Live "SuperNova"	2 February 2025	Nippon Budokan	Tokyo	Japan	
Shirakami Fubuki 1st Solo Live "FBKINGDOM ANTHEM"	13 February 2025	Pia Arena MM, SPWN/ZAIKO	Yokohama	Japan	
Hololive 6th fes. Color Rise Harmony (1st and 2nd days)	8-9 March 2025	Makuhari Event Hall, SPWN	Chiba	Japan	
Hoshimachi Suisei Live "SuperNova: REBOOT"	21 February 2026	K-Arena Yokohama	Yokohama	Japan	.

== Discography ==
=== Studio albums ===
Title	Album details	Peak chart positions			Sales
Title	Album details	JPN	JPN Comb.	JPN Hot	Sales
Still Still Stellar	Released: 29 September 2021; Label: Cover Corp; Formats: CD, digital download, LP, streaming	6	6	4	JPN: 30,882
Specter	Released: 25 January 2023; Label: Cover Corp; Formats: CD, digital download, LP, streaming	4	4	4	JPN: 55,400
Shinsei Mokuroku (新星目録)	Released: 22 January 2025; Label: Cover Corp; Formats: CD, digital download, streaming	3	2	12	JPN: 50,192

=== Extended plays ===
==== As collaborative artist in ensemble ====
Title	Details
Scrap & Build! (with Shiranui Flare, Omaru Polka, Sakura Miko and Shirogane Noel as Shiranui Construction)	Released: 8 June 2024; Label: Cover Corp; Formats: Digital download, streaming

=== Singles ===
==== As lead artist ====
Title	Year	Peak chart positions					Sales	Certifications	Album
Title	Year	JPN	JPN Comb.	JPN Dig.	JPN Hot	JPN DL	Sales	Certifications	Album
"Comet" (Note: Originally self-released as a YouTube video before it was later re-released in 2021 by Cover alongside "Bluerose") (Note: "Bluerose" and "Comet" were released on streaming services simultaneously, with "Bluerose" serving as the A-side and "Comet" serving as the B-side.)	2018	—	—	39	—	25			Still Still Stellar
"Her Trail on the Celestial Sphere" (天球、彗星は夜を跨いで, Tenkyū, Suisei wa Yoru o Mataide) (Note: Originally self-released as a YouTube video before it was later re-released in 2021 by Cover alongside "Run") (Note: "Run" and "Her Trail on the Celestial Sphere" were released on streaming services simultaneously, with "Run" serving as the A-side and "Her Trail on the Celestial Sphere" serving as the B-side.)	2019	—	—	24	—	11			Still Still Stellar
"Next Color Planet"	2020	—	—	37	—	—			Still Still Stellar
"Ghost"	2021	—	—	11	100	—	JPN: 6,263 (digital)		Still Still Stellar
"Bluerose"	2021	—	—	31	—	17			Still Still Stellar
"Run" (駆けろ, Kakero)	2021	—	—	25	—	13			Still Still Stellar
"3:12" (3時12分, Sanji Juunifun) (with Taku Inoue)	2021	—	—	—	—	—			Aliens
"SelfishDazzling" (自分勝手Dazzling, Jibun Katte Dazzling) (Note: "SelfishDazzling" and "Bye Bye Rainy" were released on streaming services simultaneously, with "SelfishDazzling" serving as the A-side and "Bye Bye Rainy" serving as the B-side.)	2021	—	—	—	—	12			Still Still Stellar and Chunithm All Justice Collection Episode III 4
"Bye Bye Rainy" (バイバイレイニー, Bai Bai Reinī)	2021	—	—	—	—	25			Still Still Stellar
"The Last Frontier" (with AZKi)	2021	—	—	—	—	—			Non-album singles
"Out of Frame" (with Inui Toko)	2021	—	—	—	—	—			Non-album singles
"Template" (Note: "Template" and "Wicked" were released on streaming services simultaneously, with "Template" serving as the A-side and "Wicked" serving as the B-side.)	2022	—	—	7	97	4			Specter
"Wicked" (featuring Mori Calliope)	2022	—	—	8	—	6			Non-album single
"CapSule" (with Mori Calliope)	2022	—	—	—	—	—			Shinigami Note
"Syakunetsu nite Junjō (Wii-Wii-Woo)" (灼熱にて純情(wii-wii-woo))	2022	—	—	31	—	15	JPN: 2,543 (digital)		Specter
"My Happy Transmission" (放送室, Hōsōshitsu)	2022	—	—	36	—	32	JPN: 1,984 (digital)		Specter
"Soirée" (ソワレ, Soware)	2022	—	—	29	—	25	JPN: 2,766 (digital)		Specter
"Pathfinder" (先駆者, Senkusha)	2023	—	—	20	—	7	JPN: 4,222 (digital)		Shinsei Mokuroku
"Sui-chan's Maintenance Song" (スイちゃんのメンテナンスソング, Sui-chan no Mentenansusongu)	2023	—	—	11	—	8	JPN: 2,844 (digital)		Non-album single
"Xion" (ザイオン)	2023	—	—	26	—	38			Shinsei Mokuroku
"Bibbidiba" (ビビデバ)	2024	15	21	5	19	5	JPN: 6,883 (physical); JPN: 39,201 (digital)	RIAJ: Platinum (st.)	Shinsei Mokuroku
"Jubilee" (ジュビリー, Jubirii) (with Kaede Takagaki as voiced by Saori Hayami)	2024	—	—	—	—	—			The Idolmaster Cinderella Girls: Starlight Master Collaboration! - Jubilee
"Moonlight" (ムーンライト, Mūnraito)	2024	—	—	8	—	7	JPN: 5,964 (digital)		Shinsei Mokuroku
"Awake"	2024	—	—	8	—	9	JPN: 5,452 (digital)		Shinsei Mokuroku
"Orbital Period"	2025	—	—	11	—	14	JPN: 3,159 (digital)		TBA
"I Don't Care" (もうどうなってもいいや, Mō Dō Natte mo Ii ya)	2025	5	45	1	29	1	JPN: 39,854 (digital)		TBA
"Bloom in the Night" (夜に咲く, Yoru ni Saku)	2025	—	—	3	—	3	JPN: 9,475 (digital)		TBA
"Suisei" (彗星)	2025	—	—	13	—	13			TBA
"Tsuki ni Mukatte Ute (Moonshot)" (月に向かって撃て)	2026	3	21	13	59	13	JPN: 12,255 (physical); JPN: 2,994 (digital)		TBA
"Chatter Chatter" (with Houshou Marine)	2026	—	—	35	—	37	JPN: 1,115 (digital)		TBA
"Primadonna" (プリマドンナ)	2026	—	—	12	—	13	JPN: 3,203 (digital)		TBA
"Going My Way" (with AZKi)	2026	—	—	14	—	19	JPN: 1,544 (digital)		TBA
"The Stargazing Girl" (星をみる少女, Hoshi wo miru shōjo)	2026	—	—	14	—	16	JPN: 2,183 (digital)		TBA
"Gum & Drop"	2026	—	—	5	—	5	JPN: 2,518 (digital)		TBA
"Zombie Zombie Zombie" (ゾンビゾンビゾンビ)	2026	—	—	20	—	24	JPN: 1,290 (digital)		TBA
"—" denotes a recording that did not chart.

==== As collaborative artist in ensemble ====
Title	Year	Peak chart positions		Album
Title	Year	JPN	JPN DL	Album
"Story Time" (with AZKi, Moona Hoshinova and Irys as Star Flower)	2022	—	23	Non-album single
"Nakamaka" (なかま歌) (with Shiranui Flare, Omaru Polka, Sakura Miko and Shirogane Noel as Shiranui Construction)	2023	—	—	Scrap & Build
"Sugar Rush" (シュガーラッシュ) (with Sakura Miko as MiComet)	2023	—	13	Non-album singles
"Get the Crown" (with Tokino Sora, Natsuiro Matsuri, Aki Rosenthal, Momosuzu Nene, Hakui Koyori, Oozora Subaru, Tokoyami Towa, and Kazama Iroha as Hoshimatic Project)	2024	—	36	Non-album singles
"Lollipop" (with Sakura Miko as MiComet)	2025	18	19	Non-album singles
"Beep Beep" (with Tokino Sora, Natsuiro Matsuri, Aki Rosenthal, Momosuzu Nene, Hakui Koyori, Oozora Subaru, Tokoyami Towa, and Kazama Iroha as Hoshimatic Project)	2026	18	69	Non-album singles
"—" denotes a recording that did not chart.

=== Promotional singles ===
Title	Year	Peak chart positions	Sales	Album
Title	Year	JPN Dig.	Sales	Album
"Stellar Stellar – From the First Take"	2022	22	JPN: 2,179 (digital)	Non-album singles
"Michizure – From the First Take" (みちづれ – From The First Take)	2022	39	JPN: 1,259 (digital)	Non-album singles
"Polar" (with Rikka featuring Asumi Sena, Gabu Rieru, Takane Lui, Fuji Aoi, Matsunaga Iori, Minase, Ireisu Yusuke, and Ryushen)	2024	—		Non-album singles
"Stellar Stellar" (with Rin Shibuya as voiced by Ayaka Fukuhara)	2024	—		The Idolmaster Cinderella Girls: Starlight Master Collaboration! - Jubilee
"I Don't Care - Movie Edition" (もうどうなってもいいや - Movie edition, Mō Dō Natte mo Ii ya - Movie edition)	2025	9	JPN: 9,779 (digital)	Non-album single
"—" denotes a recording that did not chart.

=== Other charted songs ===
Title	Year	Peak chart positions		Album
Title	Year	JPN Dig.	JPN DL	Album
"Stellar Stellar"	2021	48	33	Still Still Stellar
"Michizure" (みちづれ)	2023	—	67	Specter
"Kyōshitsu ni Ao" (教室に青)	2024	—	82	Holohoneygaoka High School -Originals-
"Golden Time Lover" (ゴールデンタイムラバー, Gōruden Taimu Rabā)	2024	—	59	Everyone's Sukima Switch
"Venus Bug" (ビーナスバグ, Bīnasu Bagu)	2025	—	75	Shinsei Mokuroku
"Caramel Pain"	2025	—	94	Shinsei Mokuroku
"—" denotes a recording that did not chart.

=== Songs not published with Cover ===
Title	Collab artist	Release date	Label	Format	Note
"Bluer than indigo" (藍より群青, Ai Yori Gunjo)	Takaaki Natsushiro (Composer & Co-singer)	25 December 2021	–	Digital EP	Commercial song for Moonstar SKLSHŌTER shoes
"Planetarium" (プラネタリウム)	DECO*27 (Composer)	15 March 2023	VIA/Toy's Factory	Physical release	Part of the collaboration project Holo*27 between Hololive and DECO*27
"Requiem" (レクイエム)	Kanaria (Composer & Co-singer)	15 April 2023	-	Digital single	Subsequently included on Shinsei Mokuroku as a solo version
"Jubilee" (ジュビリー)	Kaede Tagaki (v.a Saori Hayami) (Co-singer)	24 March 2024	Nippon Columbia	Digital single	Part of a collaboration with The Idolmaster Cinderella Girls: Starlight Stage
"Stellar Stellar" (Note: A cover version of Suisei's original Stellar Stellar)	Shibuya Rin (v.a Fukuhara Ayaka) (Co-singer)	5 April 2024	Nippon Columbia	Digital single	Part of a collaboration with The Idolmaster Cinderella Girls: Starlight Stage
"Wannabe" (なんもない, Nanmonai)	sakuma. (Composer & Lyricist), Maisondes (Producer)	1 May 2024	Maisondes	Digital single	The theme song for the anime movie Trapezium
"NeverFiction" (ネバーフィクション)	Kanaria (Composer & Co-singer)	24 August 2024	–	Digital single	

== Awards and nominations ==
Ceremony	Year	Category	Result	Ref.
The Vtuber Awards	2023	Best Music VTuber	Nominated	
The Vtuber Awards	2024	Best Music VTuber	Won	
NexTone Award	2024	Special	Won	

== See also ==
- Issei (YouTuber) - Also named as 30 under 30 by Forbes Japan in 2025
