= Summer Lesson =

2016 video game

- Physical box cover art (Miyamoto Hikari Seven Days Room edition, Asian English version)
- Developer: Bandai Namco Studios
- Publisher: Bandai Namco Entertainment
- Director: Aya Tamaki
- Producer: Katsuhiro Harada
- Engine: Unreal Engine 4
- Platform: PlayStation 4
- Release: JP: October 13, 2016; SEA: April 27, 2017
- Mode: Single-player

Summer Lesson (Japanese: サマーレッスン) is a 2016 video game developed by the Tekken Project of Bandai Namco Studios for PlayStation 4, utilizing the PlayStation VR headset. In the game, players need to play a tutor and interact with a high school girl for seven days, and the game aims for a more realistic interactive experience through the virtual reality technology.

== Gameplay ==
In Summer Lesson, the player takes the role of a tutor to a girl during her summer vacation and communicates with her. It does not use traditional game controllers but the physical movements of the PlayStation VR head-mounted accessory.

== Characters ==
- Miyamoto Hikari: Appears in the game pack Miyamoto Hikari Seven Days Room. A girl with a bright and friendly personality. Her grades are poor, so the main character becomes her tutor for the test at the end of summer vacation.
- Allison Snow: Appears in the game pack Allison Snow Seven Days Garden. A singer-songwriter girl from Pennsylvania, USA. The main character becomes her tutor so that she can study Japanese language and culture.
- Shinjo Chisato: appears in the game pack Chisato Shinjo Seven Day Etude. She is the only daughter of the wealthy Shinjo family. She is smart and excels at studying, but has a slightly nihilistic personality.

== Development and release ==
Summer Lesson was announced on September 1, 2014 as a tech demonstration making use of the virtual reality technology under development by Sony Computer Entertainment, which was then called "Project Morpheus". The video demo and screenshots of the game caused some controversy in the West, with some users on Twitter questioning the game's content and its setting in a "typical Japanese schoolgirl's room". While expected to appear at the 2014 Tokyo Game Show, it was eventually pulled because there were not enough Project Morpheus demo units with Summer Lesson available for enough people to try them out.

Motion capture was used for the character movements in the game, although the recording was done with a headset instead of a traditional "filming set". Natsumi Tagoto was cast as the role of "heroine" Hikari Miyamoto, not only as her voice actor but also as the motion actor. Katsuhiro Harada, the chief director and producer of Summer Lesson, said that the goal of the game was to make the game's character (the student) recognize the player’s existence and become surprised or sad depending on how the player interacts with her. A preview of the game was presented at E3 2015 in playable form, and the game was presented in playable form at the 2015 Tokyo Game Show. The game however was meant to be only a demonstration, but due to strong demand, Bandai Namco Entertainment announced on June 14, 2016 that it would commercially release the game. Summer Lesson was released on the same day as the PlayStation VR (Project Morpheus) accessory in late 2016 in Japan. An English language subtitled version was released in Southeast Asian territories such as Singapore and Malaysia in 2017. It has not been released in the West, with Bandai Namco expressing "cultural differences" as the reason.

Numerous DLC packs were released by Bandai Namco. The first of these was the Miyamoto Hikari Second Feel which added six outfits for Hikari and added situations where the players "feel they are actually touching the character in front of them." Later packs in 2017 included new characters Allison Snow and then Shinjo Chisato. The basic game packs for all three characters were re-released into one single physical release called Summer Lesson: Hikari, Allison, and Chisato 3 in 1 Basic Game Pack, released on February 22, 2018.

== Reception ==
Famitsu in its review scored Summer Lesson 33 out of 40.
