= Virtua Fighter Crossroads =

- Developer: RGG Studio
- Publisher: Sega
- Producer: Riichiro Yamada
- Artist: Ryo Shibasaki
- Writers: Brad Kane; Tsuyoshi Furuta; Shinji Yamamoto; David Hayter
- Series: Virtua Fighter
- Release: 2027
- Genre: Fighting
- Modes: Single-player, multiplayer

Virtua Fighter Crossroads is an upcoming fighting game developed by RGG Studio and published by Sega. It will be the sixth main installment of the Virtua Fighter series and the first original entry in two decades.

A new Virtua Fighter game was teased by Sega in November 2024 before being officially revealed the following month. It is one of the first titles from RGG Studio outside their flagship Like a Dragon/Yakuza franchise instead of the original developer Sega AM2, although developers of previous games in the Virtua Fighter series are also involved. The game is billed as a reimagining of the franchise with redesigned and new characters, and the integration of streamlined narrative and character elements through the inclusion of a single-player story mode, a first for the series. It will also be the first installment designed for modern console and PC platforms from the beginning.

== Gameplay ==
Virtua Fighter Crossroads is a 3D fighting game where two combatants face each other in an arena and use various attacks to deplete their opponent's stamina gauge, which results in a successful knockout (K.O.). In an effort to update the presentation of combat, the game incorporates in-camera transitions such as zoom-ins on whiffed attacks and a debilitation system that sees damage to individual body and facial parts being reflected in real time on characters.

=== Playable characters ===
- Akira Yuki - A martial artist from Japan who has been honing his skills since the first World Fighting Tournament.
- Bakunawa Killer - The leader of the Chinese Mafia who is known for hunting down strong fighters.
- Cielo Salinas - A young street fighter hoping to make a name for himself in Vilasapara.
- Lionel Rafale - A rich seventeen year old boy from France and the son of Lion Rafale from the second World Fighting Tournament, who has inherited his father’s Mantis technique, looking to earn his title.
- Pai Chan - A former actress and fighter from Hong Kong who now owns a restaurant and agrees to train Cielo in becoming a fighter.
- Stella Bridge - A newcomer with a striking resemblance to Sarah Bryant.
- Wolf Hawkfield - A professional wrestler from Canada that entered the first World Fighting Tournament, who has just recently come out of retirement.

== Development ==
During a financial results presentation in May 2021, Sega Sammy Holdings addressed the need to effectively utilize publisher Sega's back catalogue of older intellectual properties (IP), creating new titles in such series to bring to market while continuing to strengthen their active IP. Among such franchises mentioned was the Virtua Fighter series, which remained dormant since its last major entry Virtua Fighter 5 in 2006. At The Game Awards in December 2023, Sega announced that they had begun production on a slate of new titles in their various franchises, including Shinobi: Art of Vengeance (2025) and Crazy Taxi: World Tour (2027) as well as new installments in the Jet Set Radio, Golden Axe, Streets of Rage series. Sega's CCO Shuji Utsumi, in an interview with The Washington Post, reiterated that the publisher was still actively evaluating the viability of reviving the Virtua Fighter series, affirming his interest in seeing a new game that would feature more "dramatic" elements that would elevate the franchise's historical focus on realistic combat compared to other fighting game series, such as Street Fighter.

In November 2024, Sega's Global Head of Transmedia Justin Scarpone was interviewed by Video Games Chronicle during Gamescom Asia, and confirmed that a new entry in the Virtua Fighter franchise was among the games being produced as part of their initiative to revive classic series at the publisher, with the shared aim of reinventing the property to captivate younger generations of players with a lack of familiarity towards the series. The game is being developed by RGG Studio, the creators of the Yakuza / Like A Dragon and Super Monkey Ball franchises. RGG Studio co-developed Virtua Fighter 5 Ultimate Showdown and its subsequent updates R.E.V.O. and R.E.V.O. World Stage with Sega AM2, the original developers of the series. AM2 is involved with the development of the new game, while producer Seiji Aoki, also having been placed in charge of overseeing the reproduction and competitive scenes of earlier Virtua Fighter titles. Studio director Masayoshi Yokoyama stated that a new entry in the series had been considered multiple times in the past but cited difficulties in meeting market conditions and striking a balance between past mechanics and future innovations as to why the project took years to materalize. Producer Riichiro Yamada stated that development of a new Virtua Fighter game was motivated by the resurgence in the fighting game genre over the last decade with the revival of the Street Fighter and Tekken franchises on console and PC, and the question of whether Sega would be able to meet their popularity and re-enter the market.

Yamada asserted that the core of the new Virtua Fighter would be bridging the gap between innovation and reality, citing the fact that the technological disparity between arcade machines and home consoles, and the experiences provided on both platforms, had closed significantly since the series' latest entries at the time. He also reflected on the fact with regards to reality, the team hoped to honor Virtua Fighter's origins as a product in an era where the Kung fu film genre was immensely popular, likening the series to the fighting game equivalent of K-1 kickboxing where Street Fighter was more analogous to professional wrestling, and respecting the series' core tenets of realistic movement, a lack of characters with projectile-based attacks, and the importance of spacing between players in combat. Unlike previous entries, the new Virtua Fighter game is being designed first for home consoles and PC, and the developers stated their intention to capitalize on prioritizing such platforms by expanding single-player options that were previously dismissed from consideration due to the series' focus on arcades, such as a full story mode or elements thereof. The Virtua Fighter 5 R.E.V.O. World Stage update will introduce a namesake single-player campaign mode, laying the foundation for more substantial offline content in the series going forward.

In a subsequent interview at Evolution Championship Series (EVO) 2025, Yamada stressed the importance of expanding the cast of characters while also reimagining the older fighters, citing Akira's redesign and the importance of injecting the cast with a sense of reality that evolves them past their classic incarnations. The mindset of evolving past the constraints of the previous series extends to how they thought about the controls and mechanics, wishing to emulate the original games' simplistic scheme of three buttons for punching, kicking and blocking with no complicated systems attached, and prioritizing the accessibility of the game to wider audiences while retaining familiarity for older players. As of August 2025, Yamada claimed that the combat system for the game was "70% there" with regards to aligning with the final product.

== Release ==
The game, under the provisional title New Virtua Fighter Project, was announced with a cinematic teaser trailer accompanied by early gameplay featuring a redesigned Akira Yuki and new character Stella, presented at The Game Awards 2024 on December 12, and was immediately followed by a dedicated "VF Direct" video presentation that introduced preliminary details on the title the following day. A proof-of-concept video detailing the vision for the game's combat was previewed at Nvidia's press conference during CES in January 2025. A second VF Direct presentation aired in May 2025, which debuted a new cinematic teaser confirming the return of Wolf Hawkfield as a playable fighter. Sega debuted a first look at combat gameplay through a trailer premiered on the third day of Evolution Championship Series (EVO) in August 2025. The game made further appearances at Tokyo Game Show (TGS) in September 2025, and at Summer Game Fest (SGF) in June 2026. For the first time in series history, the title will prioritize a release on home consoles and Windows platforms, and is currently not being considered for a simultaneous arcade launch as with prior entries.
