= Sarah Bryant (Virtua Fighter) =

Virtua Fighter character

- Virtua Fighter character
- Sarah Bryant in Virtua Fighter 4
- First game: Virtua Fighter (1993)
- Created by: Yu Suzuki
- Designed by: Seiichi Ishii
- Voiced by: English: Lynn Harris (Virtua Fighter 1–Virtua Fighter 2); Claire O'Connor (Virtua Fighter 3); Lisa Fuson (Sega Dreamcast "Opening Day"commercial); Colleen Lanki (Virtua Fighter 4); Lenne Hardt (Virtua Fighter 4 home releases); Lisle Wilkerson (Virtua Quest–present); Juliet Cesario (anime); Japanese: Maya Okamoto (anime); Ayumi Tsunematsu (CR Virtua Fighter); Misako Iino (Goonya Fighter)

In-universe information
- Origin: San Francisco, California
- Nationality: American
- Fighting style: Jeet Kune Do

Sarah Bryant (Japanese: サラ・ブライアント, Hepburn: Sara Buraianto) is a character in the Virtua Fighter series of fighting games by Sega. She is a college student from San Francisco, California, who debuted in the original Virtua Fighter, brainwashed to try to kill her brother, and later tries to surpass him while seeking to take down the organization responsible. She has appeared in every game in the series, including spinoff titles, and made several guest appearances in other games, notably in Tecmo Koei's Dead or Alive 5 as a playable character. In addition, she has been featured in various print media, and in the Virtua Fighter anime.

Originally voiced by Lynn Harris, she was designed by Seiichi Ishii alongside director Yu Suzuki after a brainstorming session, and was inspired by Sarah Connor from the Terminator franchise. Her primary outfit, designed to serve as both combat-ready attire and a distraction for opponents, has remained consistent throughout the series with minimal changes. Sarah has been cited as one of the first Western female characters in Japanese fighting games, receiving much praise for her looks and character, and noted for her influence on the designs of later similar characters in other fighting game franchises. However, discussion and criticism have also arisen around the sexualization of her character done by both Sega themselves and gaming publications utilizing her image.

== Conception and design ==
Created during a brainstorming session by development team Sega AM2, her initial name was Anego (姉; lit. "Sister"), signifying her role as fellow character Jacky Bryant's sibling who at this point was called Aniki (兄貴; lit. "Big brother"). Designed by Seiichi Ishii, he stated she was inspired by the Terminator franchise character Sarah Connor, though series creator Yu Suzuki refused to comment when asked if she was based on anyone. He did, however, label her his favorite character due to her ease of use, due to the fact that she "fights aggressively: she does not stand still waiting for the opponent's move, but moves ahead. It fully reflects my personality." When asked what feelings Sarah was meant to invoke in a player, then Vice President of Product Development for Sega Eric Hammond stated it was up to the player, and they could either see her as the "damsel in distress" or the "bad girl" able to take care of herself, the latter of which he felt was a popular character trope in comic books.

Her primary outfit underwent several radical changes during development, with notes in Virtua Fighter Maniax stating that they tried to maintain a "voluptuous charm" throughout the process. Her initial design consisted of a purple short halter top, leggings, a ponytail, and pink heels. Most of these themes were carried over into the second design pass, with the halter top expanded into a full leotard featuring a sash, fingerless purple gloves, and a short dark brown haircut. The next concept was drastically different and resembled a wrestling outfit: black gloves, hotpants, and a bikini top, with pink boots and black thigh highs. Her hair color was also switched back to long and blonde at this point. The shorts and bikini top were eventually changed into a black catsuit, with the arms and shoulders exposed and extending up to her collar, and a red jewel on the belt buckle, while buttons were visible on the top. Intended to have "a sense of style while also combat-ready" and possibly serve as a "distraction," this finalized design was simplified to lose the buttons and buckle and, with Virtua Fighter 3, shifted to a dark blue color. While she has had a wide variety of secondary outfits as the series progressed, her main design has been used throughout the series and in promotional material, with only minimal change over the years.

Sarah stands about 5'8" (173 cm) tall, and has measurements of 36-23-36" (90-57-90 cm). According to Suzuki, her ponytail in the finalized design was intended to be "practical" for martial arts, given that no hair pulling is allowed in the games, while her longer legs were meant to emphasize her reliance on kick-based attacks using Jeet Kune Do. As an easter egg, her earring color changes depending on the fighting stage the player is currently engaged in, a trend continued up to Virtua Fighter 3tb. One of the goals of the series development team was to increase realism by improving the graphics from one entry to the next, with one developer saying "many polygons" were used for her chest on the Virtual Fighter 2 model. Developer Keiji Okayasu elaborated on this, stating that it caused an issue for the title's home port, as they were unable to reduce the polygon count without drastically altering her proportions.

== Appearances ==
Sarah Bryant was introduced in the 1993 video game Virtua Fighter as a college student from San Francisco, California, investigating her brother Jacky's car crash during the 1990 Indianapolis 500. While doing so, she is kidnapped by the Illuminati-esque group responsible for the crash, Judgement 6, and brainwashed to kill her brother, who had entered their World Martial Arts Tournament. However, they were unable to control her completely, and she failed, and as a result, the group focused on training her to try again in their second tournament. Jacky instead saved her and broke the brainwashing, it also caused her to have amnesia, so both entered the third tournament in hopes that the environment would help her recover her memories. Successful, it also causes her to recall what she had done while brainwashed. Uncertain if the urge to kill Jacky was due to Judgement 6 or her own desires, she enters the subsequent tournaments in hopes of surpassing him while also taking down Judgement 6. Originally voiced by Lynn Harris, since Virtua Fighter 3 she has been voiced by multiple actresses, sometimes for the same game. These actresses include Colleen Lanki, Claire O'Connor, Lisa Fuson, Lenne Hardt, and Lisle Wilkerson.

Outside of the main series, she also appears in several other fighting games, such as Sega's Virtua Fighter Animation, which utilized 2D sprites, Virtua Fighter Kids, a parody of the franchise featuring the characters as super deformed children with more playful representations of their storylines, and Sega franchise crossover title Fighters Megamix. She was featured in Koei Tecmo's Dead or Alive 5 as a guest character, due to Virtua Fighter's influence on their franchise's development. Outside of fighting games, she has appeared as a non-playable character in Sega's action role-playing game Virtua Quest, and later in SNK's The King of Fighters All Star as part of a collaboration event. After the release of Digital Dance Mix Vol. 1 Namie Amuro (1997), Yu Suzuki told Sega Saturn Magazine that he was interested in developing a sequel featuring Sarah. However, the game was never released. In 2022, her likeness was used for the skin of the character Nina Williams in Tekken 7.

=== In other media ===
An anime series called Virtua Fighter was also produced, consisting of thirty-minute segments and directed by Hideki Tonokatsu, with Ryo Tanaka as the character designer. Voiced by Maya Okamoto in Japanese and Juliet Cesario in localized releases, she appears in the third episode onward, acting as a grid girl for her brother when he races. In this incarnation, she also has a pet flying squirrel named Alexander, who serves as the animal sidekick for the show. After helping series protagonists Akira Yuki and Pai Chan, two other fighters from the games, she fights alongside them with Jacky, and they travel together as a group. Later on, she is kidnapped due to her fighting ability and brainwashed with the intention of creating a "pure human weapon with no emotion", attacking the group and beating Jacky severely afterwards. When the control unit giving her commands is broken, she goes berserk, but after being knocked out, she comes to her senses. However, the data gathered while Sarah was experimented on is used to create a robotic duplicate of her, Dural, whom the heroes fight at the end of the series.

A manga series titled Virtua Fighter: Legend of Sarah by Takahal Matsumoto was published in installments within issues of Weekly Playboy and Comic Tetsujin in 1996, which focused on Jacky and Sarah's lives before and after the first tournament. It was later compiled and sold separately as a standalone book and GameWare Vol. 2 for the Sega Saturn. An additional manga named Virtua Fighter was also released, featuring her; written by Billy Takibana, it acted as a retelling of the anime series. Lastly, a separate one-shot comic was released in 1995 by Marvel Comics written by Mark Paniccia, featuring her in a smaller role and noted as having a more "tongue-in-cheek" storyline.

== Promotion and reception ==
Sega leaned heavily into the character's sexuality, to both criticism and praise

In a 2000 interview for the book From Barbie to Mortal Kombat: Gender and Computer Games, the then-corporate spokesman for Sega in North America, Lee Caraher, stated that of their fighting game characters, Sarah was picked the most often in her observation, regardless of the player's gender. A variety of merchandise was released to promote the character and series, including a set of playing cards featuring images of moves from the game, pinups, and a CD of 3D rendered images released after Virtua Fighter 2, showcasing her in a bikini by a pool.

Sarah was well received since her debut. In an interview with Famitsu, Yosuke Hayashi of game development team Team Ninja called Sarah one of two characters that "carry with them the history of the [Virtua Fighter] series". Sega Saturn Magazine described her as "one of the most brilliant creations in the world of video games", praising her brainwashing plot and, more heavily, her breast size. Arcade featured her on a two-page spread, praising her appearance but lamenting that they knew little about the character's personality from her in-game appearances or Suzuki's statements about her. Meanwhile, the staff of the German website M! Games stated that while the Virtua Fighter games put emphasis on fighting performance over the "charms" of their female cast, they considered her "the best example that even fighting ladies without exaggerated curves can be successful" in such titles.

Oshino Izumi in Gamest magazine's Gal's Island series of issues stated that everyone was "captivated by the dazzling precision" of her fighting style, and helped make her character appear to have a natural talent for Jeet Kun Do. Comparing her to Jackie who used a similar fighting style, Izumi observed that while his attacks focused on power, hers focused on speed giving them a more elegant appearance. He felt this coupled with her variety of kicks and an emphasis on "sharp and graceful" animations in the game made her technique feel more "showy" than Jackie's approach and complimented her attractive appearance. In the same issue, the staff described her as "a beautiful killing machine", citing her proportions, well-defined features, and blonde hair as further reasons for her popularity.

Sarah has also been the subject of academic study regarding sexualization and video games since her introduction. J. C. Hertz in the 1997 book Joystick Nation called her "the reigning queen of 3D polygon fighting game characters", describing her as being "built like an Olympic swimmer. [...] This woman has powerful shoulders and strong legs, and she's tall", further stating she was more realistic than Pamela Anderson. In a note, she additionally praised her outfit, calling her modestly attired and "dressed for business, not for show." However, despite these strong aspects, he noted her usage in media such as Next Generation magazine focused on her as a sexual element for their young male readers, complete with pull out poster and text akin to a Playboy article, and felt this helped contribute towards a negative view of women by those readers. The 2015 German book Sheroes: Genderspiele im virtuellen Raum cited her multiple times in an examination of the image of feminine power versus conventional women, and argued that the use of martial arts enhanced her sexualization and emphasized the idea that a woman's most powerful weapon is her body.

In a discussion with Takashi Kurokochi, orthopedic surgeon and director of the Yurakucho Cosmetic Surgery Clinic, Japanese magazine Game Hihyou asked him to comment on female characters in fighting games and what made their designs particularly beautiful in the eyes of Japanese audiences, among them Sarah. Kurokochi examined that her nose was particularly unusual in how it emphasized the cartilage due to its thin tip. Meanwhile, her eyes and eyebrows were shown farther apart from other characters he examined, giving her a more chiseled look in his view. Lastly, he pointed out how her jawline was clearly defined and that the emphasis on this, alongside her neck and cheekbones, in her Virtua Fighter 4 appearance helped set her apart from the Japanese characters.

The staff of Chinese magazine Diànzǐ Yóuxì Ruǎnjiàn, in their supplemental 1997 issue, stated that while she could be seen as a "typical American" due to her height, blonde hair with blue eyes, and muscular build, they felt she was exceptionally beautiful. They expressed that this aspect could be seen more clearly in promotional art for the game, comparing her appearance to American actress Sharon Stone. Further praise was given to her personality as the series progressed, seeing her as considerate and stating that while she was often a gentle person, her main character flaw was that she could be willful and domineering.

=== Comparisons and legacy ===
Sarah has also been compared to similar characters introduced in later fighting games. Roger Miller of Game On! USA called her a "true original", praising her as one of the first female characters in 3D fighting games and preferring her over later similar characters such as Battle Arena Toshinden's Sofia and Tekken's Nina Williams, the latter of which he called a "clone, right down to the purple clothes". He further noted of the three, "for sheer volume of fan material published, Sarah Bryant is #1". The magazine Total Control was far more critical of the character in its own comparison, citing Virtua Fighter as an example of sexism in video games due to her presence and portrayal in the title. They felt that Tekken as a franchise was more respectful to its female characters, and added that "Sega would be exploiting Sarah Bryant for all she was worth if they could convince anyone she was sexy."

Russian magazine Страна игр also compared Nina and Sarah, stating that both characters had not only similar designs but also a very soap opera feel to their respective storylines, particularly in their roles as assassins dealing with memory loss. They suggested it was possible that Nina was a form of plagiarism on the part of Bandai Namco, but as neither company showed any hostility towards one another, it had become a bit of an inside joke between them. On Sarah's own merits, they commented that she was often known for her powerful legs, stating it was a "shame to use such beauty for such an unladylike purpose", and felt that for a long time she was the one "truly pleasing heroine" in Virtua Fighter until the introduction of characters such as Vanessa and Aoi.

Toby Gard, creator of Lara Croft, cited Sarah and Pai Chan as influences on why he chose a female protagonist for the Tomb Raider series, stating that when he saw people play Virtua Fighter, he noticed they often used the pair over other characters in the game, and felt this use of female characters in gaming was something the market "hadn't really caught on to yet". Meanwhile, University of Delaware professor Rachael Hutchinson noted the positive influence of the characters' sexuality, citing her as significant due to being "the first Western woman in a Japanese fighting game" and that her "tall frame, blond hair and jutting breasts formed the template for later, more sexualized figures" such as Ivy Valentine in Soulcalibur and Nina Williams. She further stated her belief that the increased sexualization in Sarah's own design as the Virtua Fighter series progressed was in part response to the aforementioned Ivy, causing "a ‘sexualization race’ among companies who could produce (and get away with) the most outrageous skin exposure and physical forms", eventually leading to the creation of titles such as Dead or Alive Xtreme Beach Volleyball.
