= Lenne Hardt =

American voice actress and ring announcer

- Born: Alaska, United States
- Other name: Lenne Hardt
- Occupations: Voice actress, ring announcer
- Agent: Aoni Production
- Spouse: Malcolm Mahs
- Website: www.lennehardt.com

Lenne Hardt is an American voice actress and ring announcer for Japanese mixed martial arts organizations. Her resume includes PRIDE Fighting Championships, DREAM, ONE Championship and Glory World Series and she currently works in Rizin Fighting Federation. She is also the official announcer for Japanese idol group Momoiro Clover Z, and was the official athlete announcer for the 2022 ADCC World Championship hosted by Seth Daniels from F2W.

== Biography ==
Hardt was the youngest of six children and an Air Force brat. Although she was born in Alaska, she spent much of her childhood in Idaho. Hardt and her siblings were home-schooled. At the age of 17, Hardt lived in Japan for a year with her brother and sister-in-law, who were already long-time residents of the country. Hardt returned to the U.S. and attended New York University to study the Japanese language and arts before permanently moving to Japan in 1988. While in Tokyo she met her future-husband, a New Zealander. In addition to working as a disc jockey and announcer for television and radio, she has worked as a voice actress for the English dubs of Japanese anime and video games. She also performs as a theater actor and comedian.

== Ring announcing ==
Hardt entered into a career as an English language announcer for mixed martial arts events in 2000 at PRIDE's first Grand Prix. PRIDE officials needed an announcer fluent in English and Japanese. Although she had no experience with the sport, her agent contacted her about the job and she took it simply because it fit into her schedule. Hardt became a self-described fan of the sport and continued as the English announcer for PRIDE until its final event. When the former staff of PRIDE created DREAM, Hardt was carried over as well. Hardt has also worked with Japanese pro wrestling organization New Japan Pro-Wrestling as a special guest English language ring announcer for their January 4 Tokyo Dome shows, announcing both Wrestle Kingdom 8 in 2014 and Wrestle Kingdom 9 in 2015.

Hardt's energetic style, which usually includes high-pitched screeching and long alveolar trills, has earned her notoriety within the promotion. Fans have dubbed her "Crazy PRIDE Lady" and many fighters admit to getting "pumped up" by her introductions. She uses singing techniques to prevent damage to her throat rather than take measures to mitigate the damage.

In 2022, Hardt was the announcer for the ADCC Worlds No-Gi grappling championship and performed the ceremonial fighters' presentation.

== Filmography ==
=== Anime roles ===
- BeyWheelz - Ring Announcer
- Hayate the Combat Butler - MC (ep. 28)
- Idaten Jump
- Kinnikuman Nisei: Ultimate Muscle II - Herself (ep. 9)
- Kirarin Revolution
- Mobile Suit Gundam Unicorn - Operator (ep. 1)
- Ring ni Kakero 1 - Ring Call
- TONIKAWA: Over the Moon for You - Game Announcer

=== Television Drama roles ===
- Kikai Sentai Zenkaiger - Zenkaiger Equipment Voice

=== Video game roles ===
Year	Title	Role	Notes	Source
2000	Shenmue	Tao Lin Xia		
2001	Bloody Roar 3	Shina		
2002	Gitaroo Man	U-1		
2002	Virtua Fighter 4	Sarah Bryant, System Voice (Menus)	In-Game Battle Voice Archive as Sarah in Virtua Quest until Virtua Fighter 5, including Dead or Alive 5 (Ultimate / Last Round)	
2002	Shenmue II	Guixiang Lee		
2003	Mega Man X7	Axl		
2003	Glass Rose	Youko Yoshinodou, Marie Yoshinodou		
2004	Boktai 2: Solar Boy Django	Zazie, Duneyrr		
2004	Rumble Roses	Bloody Shadow / Judgment		
2004	Tekken 5	Anna Williams	In-Game Battle Voice Archive in Tekken 6 (2007, last in-game battle dialogue role) until Tekken 7 (Season 2/2018, grunts only)	
2005	Cobra the Arcade	The Executioners, Ironhead, Sandra		
2005	Musashi: Samurai Legend	Musashi		
2005	Shining Force Neo	Rebecca		
2011	Little Charo Travels in English!	Margherita		

- Air Gallet - Narrator
- Confidential Mission
- Nightshade - Vocals ("It's My Day")
- Countdown Vampires - Jane Dark, Three Witches, Additional Voices
- EA Sports MMA - Herself (Japanese and Vale Tudo rules)
- FantaVision - Announcer
- Fighting for One Piece - System Voice
- Futari no Fantavision - Announcer
- Kinnikuman Muscle Grand Prix Series - Announcer
- Kinnikuman Muscle Generations - Announcer
- Octomania - Angelique, Fei Fei
- Phantasy Star Nova - System Voice
- Pride Fighting Championships - Herself
- Space Griffon VF-9 - Maria Hansfield
- The Transformers - Arcee
- UFC Undisputed 3 - Herself (PRIDE mode)
- Yakuza 0 / Yakuza 0: Director's Cut - Coliseum Announcer
