= Akira Yuki =

- Virtua Fighter character
- Akira Yuki in Virtua Fighter 5: R.E.V.O.
- First game: Virtua Fighter (1993)
- Created by: Yu Suzuki
- Voiced by: English: Jay Momet (Virtua Quest); Tony Schnur (anime); Japanese: Takenobu Mitsuyoshi (Virtua Fighter); Shin-ichiro Miki (Virtua Fighter 2–present); Shohei Abe (Goonya Fighter)

In-universe information
- Fighting style: Bajiquan
- Nationality: Japanese

Akira Yuki (Japanese: 結城 晶, Hepburn: Yūki Akira) is a fictional character in Sega's Virtua Fighter fighting game franchise, debuting in the original 1993 game. Akira appears as a playable character using Bajiquan in every game in the series; he strives for perfection and relentlessly works to master his techniques. To perfect his skills, Akira seeks worthy opponents to fight. Besides Virtua Fighter series, Akira appears as a guest character in Dead or Alive 5, the crossover fighting game Dengeki Bunko: Fighting Climax, and Sonic & Sega All-Stars Racing. In the anime adaptation of the series, Akira is portrayed an immature fighter who seeks his grandfather's approval while fighting several criminals. During the series, Akira forms several friendships with his fellow fighters.

The game designer Yu Suzuki created Akira Yuki due to his fascination with Bajiquan, which he researched during production of the first Virtua Fighter game. Suzuki also planned to use Akira as the protagonist of a spin-off game based on the series that would focus on a revenge quest, but it was scrapped in favor of Shenmue. Akira was portrayed by several voice actors.

Akira has been a popular character; game designer Tomonobu Itagaki described him as an early 3D fighter whom he tried to emulate. Akira became famous with gaming journalists due to the difficulty of emulating his fighting skills; the character has been criticized by writers who found his design derivative from other fighting-game characters, most notably Ryu from Street Fighter. Responses to his characterization in the anime were mixed; nevertheless, Akira has been described as the series' mascot.

== Concept and creation ==
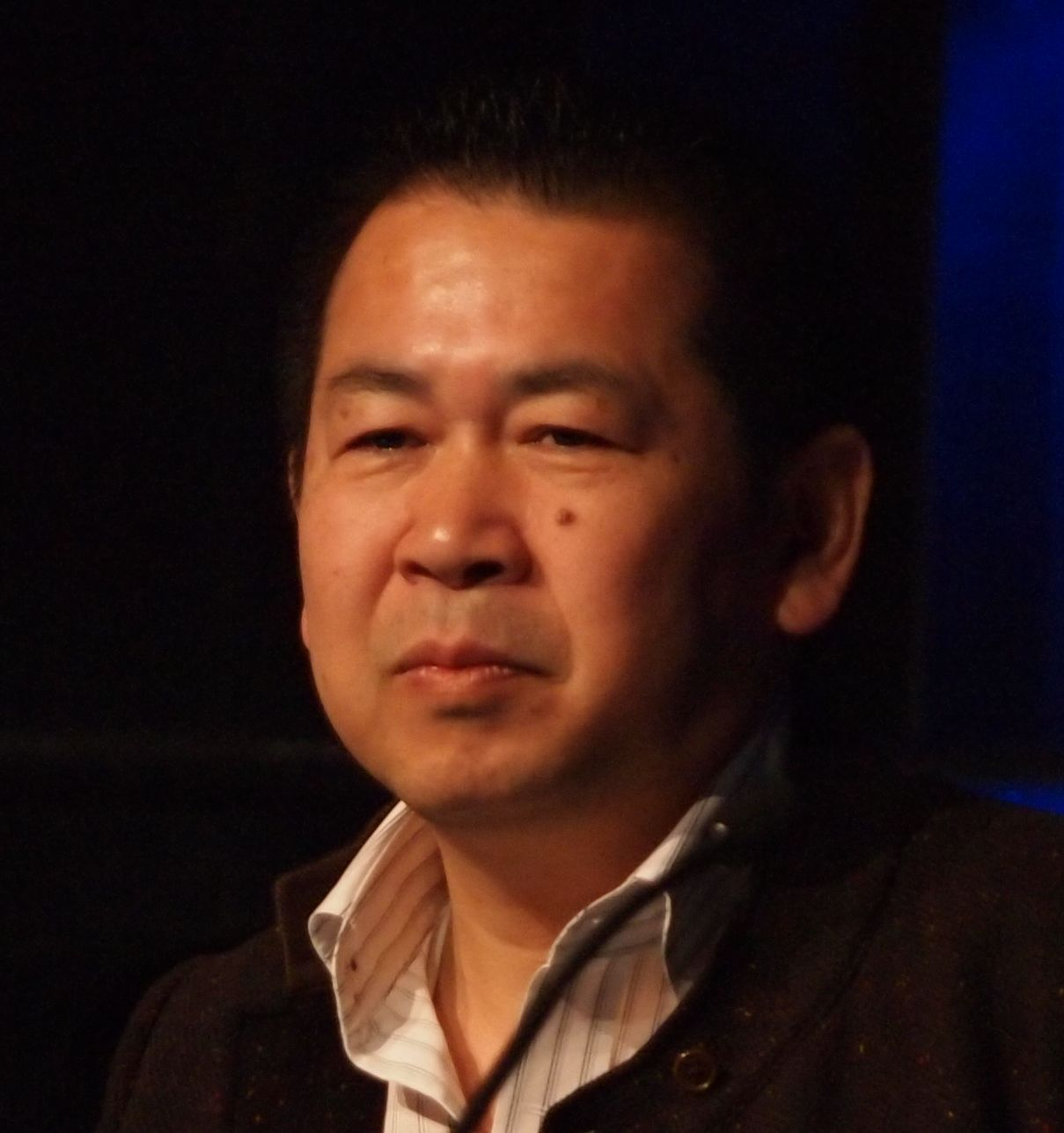
Yu Suzuki created Akira Yuki

Despite being the signature character of Virtua Fighter, Akira was added late in the game's development as the final addition prior to release. The series' co-creator Yu Suzuki had a growing interest in te Chinese martial art Bajiquan, leading to the character's creation. Akira replaced Siba, a Arab character who was originally intended for the game but was removed. The model for Akira was Masaaki Satake.

Suzuki's favorite manga character was Ryuchi Matsuda's Kenji; Suzuki was particularly impressed by a scene about the character Li Shuwen that was depicted in the spin-off. Kenji's protagonist, Go Kenji, also learns Bajiquan. After creating Virtua Fighter, Suzuki met Matsuda and was deeply moved by the experience. Matsuda told Suzuku how the motions he created for 'Ferocious Tiger Gobazan' differ from real-life techniques. Many of the characters other than Akira were inspired by manga and martial artists. When developing the game, Suzuki visited a Chinese Kenpo temple to research; the grandmaster taught him Hakkyokuken, which helped him further develop Akira. Akira became Suzuki's favorite character due to his fighting style and philosophy.

Sega worked on a commercial for the game with martial artist Rickson Gracie; its premise was no one had ever defeated Gracie, but he finally meets his match in Akira Yuki. When they talked, Gracie was humble and was the perfect "Samurai" type. That situation is a strong memory for Suzuki.

Following multiple installments with a martial arts gi, Akira Yuki was given a more casual design for Virtua Fighter Crossroad as a major departure of his classic look.

In 1996, Sega AM2 began developing a role-playing game (RPG) with the working title Guppy for the Sega Saturn console. This became Virtua Fighter RPG: Akira's Story, starring Akira. AM2 planned a "cinematic" approach that included voice acting and elaborate combat sequences. Suzuki researched locations in China, and constructed four acts with the themes "sadness", "fight", [sic] "departure" and "starting afresh". In this version of the story, Akira would overcome his grief following his father's death, travel to China, defeat an antagonist, and begin a journey with a new friend. Suzuki recruited a screenwriter, a playwright and film directors to write the story. In 1997, development moved to Sega's upcoming console the Dreamcast, and the Virtua Fighter connection was dropped in favor of the new intellectual property (IP) Shenmue with a new lead.

Akira was redesigned for the upcoming Virtua Fighter game. Producer Riichiro Yamada stressed the importance of expanding the cast while reimagining the legacy fighters, citing Akira's redesign and the importance of giving the characters a sense of reality that evolves them past their classic incarnations. He brought parallels to other protagonists such Ryu from Street Fighter 6 and Kazuma Kiryu in Yakuza: Like a Dragon whose designers try to redesigned and bring successors after several installments. Yamada said they aged Akira, who represented the original generation and contrast with the designs of the new characters. He felt the fandom's response to Akira has always been positive.

In the first Virtua Fighter Akira is voiced by Japanese composer Takenobu Mitsuyoshi. Starting with the sequel, Mitsuoyoshi was replaced by Shin-ichiro Miki, who provided his talent in every work, with the exception of Goonya Fighter, where he is voiced by Hiroshi Abe. In Virtua Quest, Akira is voiced by English actor Jay Momet, while Tony Schnur took the role for the anime adaptation.

== Appearances ==
In the Virtua Fighter series, after being trained by his grandfather, a World War II veteran, Akira Yuki goes a quest to test his abilities. In the first game in the series, Akira joins the 1st World Fighting Tournament. Despite winning several tournaments, he does not get his grandfather's approval in the sequel. Akira loses in the third installment, but finally gains encouragement from his grandfather and decides to continue training. In Virtua Fighter 4, Akira enters another tournament to test his newly learned skills but he loses to Kage-Maru. One day, Akira understands he has been "resisting the flow" and resumes his training, leading to the events of Virtua Fighter 5. An older Akira is set to return to an untitled new installment as a playable character.

Akira also appears in the spin-off games Virtua Fighter Animation, Virtua Fighter Kids and Virtua Quest. Akira is also the protagonist of the anime anime television adaption of the game series; this version of Akira tends to overeat and slack off. In the anime series, after becoming overconfident with his Bajiquan skills, he goes on a quest for the eight stars of heaven. Akira and Pai Chan develop feelings for each other.

Akira appears in several games outside the Virtua Fighter universe, including Fighters Megamix, Sonic & Sega All-Stars Racing, Dead or Alive 5, Project X Zone, Project X Zone 2, Dengeki Bunko: Fighting Climax, The King of Fighters All Star, and Super Smash Bros. Ultimate. The former five games feature him as a playable character, while Smash Ultimate features him as an Assist Trophy and a Mii costume. The child version of Akira from Virtua Fighter Kids also appears in Fighters Megamix. On December 8, 2021 a skin of Kazuma Kiryu from the action-adventure series Yakuza was released for Akira in Virtua Fighter 5 Ultimate Showdown as downloadable content (DLC). Akira also received a skin for Kazuya Mishima from the fighting-game series Tekken in VF5US.

== Reception ==
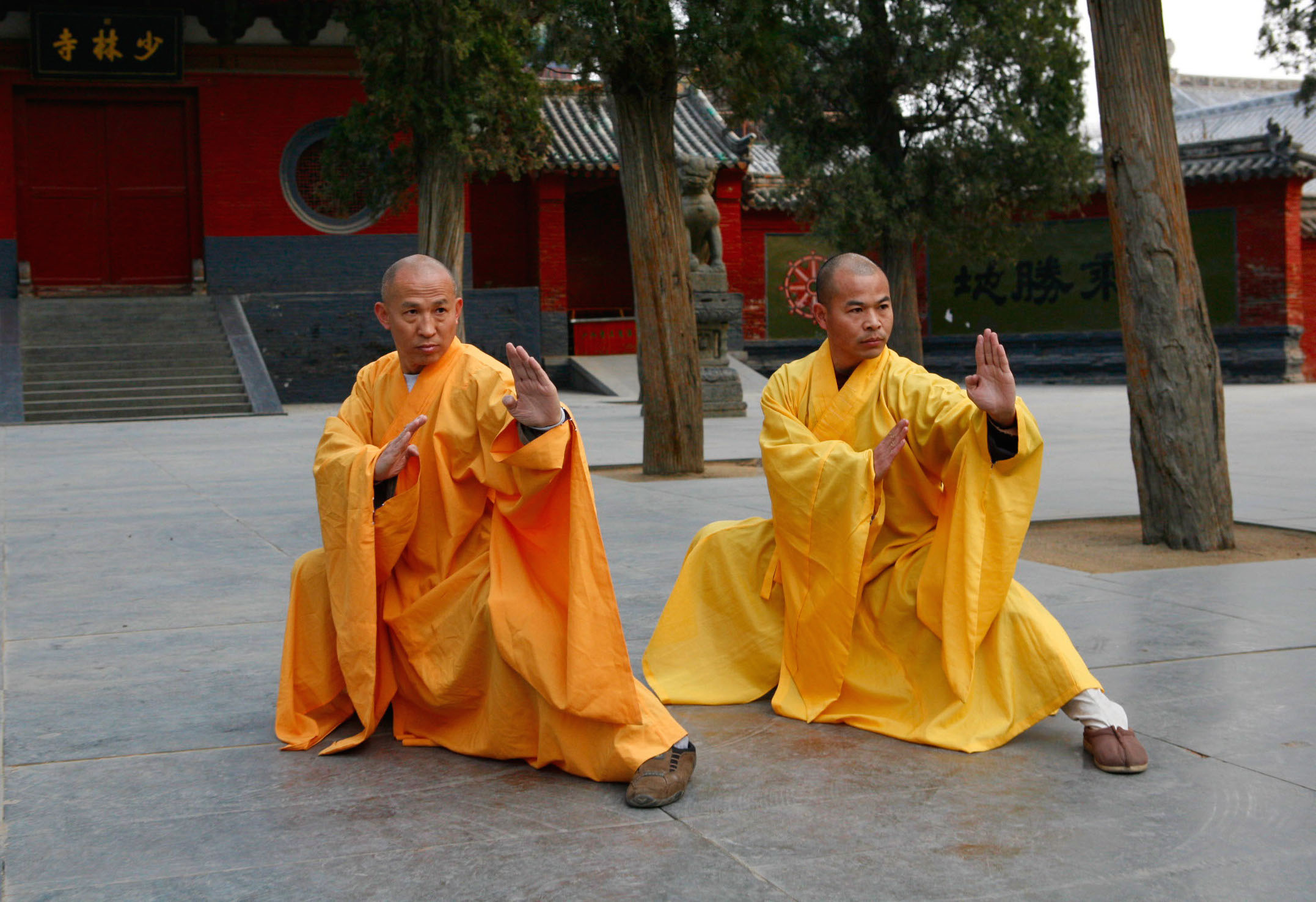
Akira's use of real Chinese martial arts was praised because it contrast his Japanese nationality.

Critical responses to Akira's portrayal were mixed due to his similarities to other characters. He has been compared to Ryu from Street Fighter, described as an "everyday man" in contrast to Kage-maru, a more mysterious character. Early in Akira's creation, the book The Sega Arcade Revolution noted he bore a resemblance to Kazuya Mishima, creating speculation Kazuya's design was based on Akira. His design in Virtua Fighter 6 received praise from Game Rant and GameKult writers, the latter saying the design helped differentiate Akira from Ryu. Games Sina said while Virtua Fighter features many Chinese martial-art styles, Akira's nationality makes him the most outstanding character. According to this writer, the developers chose the ancient Chinese martial art of Bajiquan rather than karate or judo as the protagonist's martial art because of its unique characteristics. In promoting Virtua Fighter 5 updates, merchandise based on Akira was released, which according to Yahoo! News and the Chinese website Game Base, was successful.

Video Game and Computer Games said Akira resembles many fighting-game protagonists, but Akira and Ryu are most alike, with their identical faces and uniforms, their short-circuited brains that know only how to fight, and their always-empty wallets and bellies. These two characters frequently participate in fighting tournaments; they should be able to afford to open a dojo by watching others light their guns. The writer said the two characters do not know where they spent the money, and even if it is used to help the poor, they should keep some for themselves.

IGN described the cancelled spin-off meant to focus on Akira's revenge quest as a "revenge epic in the tradition of Chinese cinema". Thomas Bowen of Game Rant mentioned Akira's parallels with Ryo, such as a revenge quest and similar techniques. In retrospect, a commenter on Metro.co.uk said Akira might have been a tedious RPG protagonist and they would have preferred Ryo Hazuki in the form of Shenmue. Hardcore Gamer said Shaheen from Tekken seems like an answer to Akira; both fighters use the same fighting style, the exception being Shaheen's use of a sword, which is unusual in fighting games.

Critical responses to Akira's characterization in the Virtua Fighter anime series were mixed as a result of goofy traits and his relationships with the other characters. Producer Yosuke Hayashi said he felt honored to have Akira and Sarah in their game Dead or Alive because they have been playable in Viruta Fighter since the first installment.

=== Analysis of gameplay ===
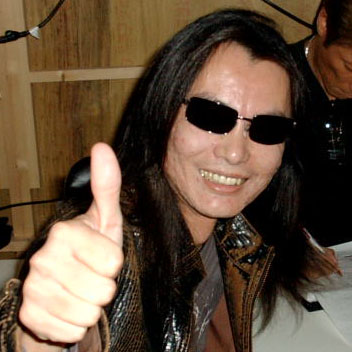
Game designer Tomonobu Itagaki created a character in Dead or Alive inspired by Akira.

Diànzǐ Yóuxì Ruǎnjiàn said Akira is a representative figure of the martial arts world. With a simple and unpretentious appearance, he is dressed as a true "fighter"; his fighting style is extremely tough, and the maturity of his moves and the brilliance of his combos are breathtaking. Many players in China enjoy using this character, and the more difficult the move, the more players strive to achieve a high level of mastery, such as the "Double Tiger Palms" technique. Almost all of Akira's high-damage moves have significant drawbacks. Kage's speed is superior, and Akira has no advantage in close-quarters combat. In the third installment, they seem to have reached an even higher level, unleashing a series of forward rolls and straight punches that leave opponents groaning and tumbling, and predicting the opponent's moves. None of the Akiras he encountered rely on counter-attacks for their livelihood. Jacky and Sarah do no have problems dealing with Akira, whom Jacky views as inferior.

Game Software Magazine said Akira has the strongest Japanese spirit despite being a Chinese martial artist. The magazine said, despite looking like a laughable character, everyone should learn from Akira's indomitable spirit, which is proved by his achievements, most notably in Virtua Fighter 2. In that installment, the reviewer called Akira a near-perfect character who has the most comprehensive offensive, defensive, and counter-attack techniques. Significant skill is required to use these techniques; improper use can lead to disaster. With the release of Virtua Fighter 3, the magazine said Akira became more popular, especially in Asia, where his fandoms surpassed Jacky's. Real Sound said Akira is extremely difficult to control, and on the day of the match, was unfamiliar with the environment, so he struggled to move the way he wanted. The reviewer was quite surprised at themself for wanting to use this character. The audience was pleased, too, saying things like "I never thought they'd see Akira". Although he lost the match, the writer thought it was still a great experience.

In the magazine GameAxis Unwired, Akira was listed as a character who is influences gameplay, due to the level of detail in his martial arts. Akira Mark Fujita from IGN said button smashing is not useful with Akira, and instead, players need timing. Fujita called Akira "your typical no nonsense character" due to his lack of alternate stances and outstanding, flashy moves. Fujita said "The Stun Palm of Doom" demands training to properly execute to the point Sega would create an alternative take that is easier for newcomers. By the time of writing the article, Fujita still could not master Akira. In a 1995 issue of Mean Machines Sega, the reviewer considered Akira a "bit of a turkey" in the original Virtua Fighter, but said he was the best character in Virtua Fighter 2. Davi Nonato Braid at TheGamer said Akira is the best character in Virtua Fighter 5 Ultimate Showdown despite being difficult to master, citing the complex mechanics the player has to master to use him. Siliconera said because Akira is too slow due to the need for strategy to perform his stronger moves, the reviewer preferred to play Sarah Bryant when both became guest characters in Dead or Alive. Tecmo producer Tomonobu Itagaki aimed to make Dead or Alive character Kokoro similar to Akira; both characters practice Hakkyokuken. Itagaki tried to make Kokoro as realistic as possible. Itagaki considered the Akira from Virtua Fighter the "origin of 3D fighting games".
