= Virtua Fighter Animation =

1996 video game

- Game Gear cover art
- Developer: Aspect
- Publisher: Sega
- Designers: Yasuhiro Nishimoto (Producer); Teruo Hamai (Chief designer)
- Composer: Kojiro Mikusa
- Series: Virtua Fighter
- Platforms: Game Gear, Master System
- Release: Game Gear: JP: March 29, 1996; NA: August 30, 1996; EU: 1996; Master System: BRA: December 1997
- Genre: Fighting
- Mode: Single-player

Virtua Fighter Animation, known in Japan as Virtua Fighter Mini (バーチャファイターMini, Bācha Faitā Mini), is a 1996 fighting video game for the Game Gear and Master System. It is based on the Virtua Fighter anime series.

== Gameplay ==
The main mode of gameplay is a story mode, which shows cut scenes between stages. Unusually for a Virtua Fighter game, this meant a restricted choice of characters, as each one is unlocked after being beaten in the story. Virtua Fighter Animation offers three viewing modes: Normal, Large, and Realtime. Realtime was an effort to recreate the zooming camera effects of the 3D Virtua Fighter games, by swapping between small and large sprites to represent distance.

=== Characters ===
Despite their appearances in the anime, Jeffry McWild, Shun Di and Lion Rafale were not included in this game.

- Akira Yuki
- Pai Chan
- Lau Chan
- Wolf Hawkfield
- Kage-Maru
- Sarah Bryant
- Jacky Bryant
- Dural

== Release ==
In Japan, Virtua Fighter Mini was marketed as part of the rebranding of the Game Gear to "Kid's Gear". It has a multiplayer mode missing from other releases, as the game was included as part of a special bundle containing a Game Gear with Virtua Fighter artwork and a link cable. It also contains an extended introduction sequence based on the opening of the anime series.

To make it more marketable outside Japan, some parts of the English script were changed from the Japanese version's by making it a little comedic instead of seriously faithful to the original Japanese version of the anime's script. The Master System version of Virtua Fighter Animation was only released in Brazil, where it was produced officially by Tec Toy. It is identical to the Sega Game Gear version, except it lacks the viewing modes of it, and uses the English script from the international releases.

A Sega Genesis version of Virtua Fighter Animation was also in development, and scheduled for release in 1997 in North America. However, it was cancelled due to marketing issues.
