= Virtua Fighter (TV series) =

1995-1996 Japanese anime series

- バーチャファイター
- Genre: Adventure, Martial arts
- Created by: Yu Suzuki
- Developed by: Tsutomu Kamishiro
- Directed by: Hideki Tonokatsu; Masahiro Mutō
- Music by: Kaoru Ōhori
- Country of origin: Japan
- Original language: Japanese
- No. of episodes: 35

Production
- Producers: Keisuke Iwata (TV Tokyo); Hirokazu Ige (Yomiko Advertising); Yasumichi Ozaki (TMS)
- Production companies: TV Tokyo; Yomiko Advertising; Kyokuichi Tokyo Movie (Note: Credited as Tokyo Movie Shinsha until episode 4.)

Original release
- Network: TXN (TV Tokyo)
- Release: 2 October 1995 – 27 June 1996

Virtua Fighter (Japanese: バーチャファイター, Hepburn: Bācha Faitā) known specifically as Virtua Fighter Animation is a Japanese anime television series based on the Virtua Fighter series of video games made by Sega. Produced by TV Tokyo, Yomiko Advertising and TMS-Kyokuichi, it was directed by Hideki Tonokatsu, with Tsutomu Kamishiro handling series scripts, Ryō Tanaka designing the characters, Satoshi Katō serving as sound director and Kaoru Ōhori composing the music. Targeted towards children aged 6 to 15 years old, the series originally aired on TV Tokyo from October 2, 1995, to June 27, 1996. The episodes take place before the first game in the series, and accordingly portray the characters as slightly younger than they are in the games.

== Plot ==
The series follows Akira Yuki and his quest to see the eight stars of heaven after he had gotten overconfident in his Bajiquan skills from his days training with his grandfather. Initially traveling to figure out how to see those stars again, he learns that Sarah Bryant was kidnapped by robotics scientist Eva Durix as part of Eva's quest to create the "Perfect Soldier."

Akira joins up with other characters in his journey such as Pai Chan, Jacky Bryant, Lion Rafale, Kage-Maru and Shun Di to save Sarah.

== Characters ==
Cast of the anime

Some of the following characters who appear in the show are based on those in Virtua Fighter and Virtua Fighter 2, while some were created solely for the show.

Akira Yuki (結城晶) Voiced by: Shin-ichiro Miki (Japanese); Tony Schnur (English)

Unlike his video game counterpart, Akira enjoys overeating and slacking off. Akira fights only when he sees people getting into trouble, but often gets into minor problems, such as when he accidentally touches Sarah Bryant's breast or when he gives Pai Chan a kiss (which results in a beating).

Pai Chan (パイ・チェン) Voiced by: Naoko Matsui (Japanese); Amy Tipton (English)

Initially meeting with Akira after an encounter in the Los Angeles Chinatown district, she joins up with him so as to avoid being hunted down by renegade Koenkan fighters, her estranged father, Lau Chan and her supposed fiancée, Liu Kowloon. In the series, Pai gets along with Akira despite his everlasting appetite, then eventually develop feelings for him. According to her (unlike her video game counterpart), she learned Ensei-ken forcibly by her father when she was a little girl, rather than by his kind persuasion. Her mother, never shown in the games themselves, was instead shown in the anime, having died of an illness when she was little as opposed to Pai's mother dying when she was 16.

Lau Chan (ラウ・チェン) Voiced by: Shigeru Chiba (Japanese); Thomas Bruning (English)

Pai's estranged father, Lau wanted her to marry Liu Kowloon so that there would be a successor to the Koenkan. He later helps Pai, Akira and the others to defeat Eva's Dural robot.

Jacky Bryant (ジャッキー・ブライアント) Voiced by: Yasunori Matsumoto (Japanese); Michael Granberry (English)

Like his game counterpart, Jacky still has the role of a known Formula One (in the game he is referred to be an IndyCar race driver). He travels along with his sister, Sarah Bryant and her pet flying squirrel in a RV whenever he is not doing any Formula One racing. Jacky tends to be protective of Sarah. There are suggestions throughout the series that he and Sarah belong to an American upper class family. (This was later adapted into the games when Virtua Fighter 5 was released.)

- First appears in Episode 3, "The Gorgeous Sibling Fighters"

Sarah Bryant (サラ・ブライアント) Voiced by: Maya Okamoto (Japanese); Juliet Cesario (English)

Sarah is kind and gentle in the anime. She has a flying squirrel named Alexander for a pet and travels with Jacky Bryant in their RV. Whenever Jacky participates in any Formula One contest, Sarah helps out by doing racing queen duties. She is later kidnapped by Eva Durix to be used as a basis for creating a "Perfect Soldier", Dural. In the series, she has a crush on Akira but later has feelings for Kage.

- First appears in Episode 3, "The Gorgeous Sibling Fighters"

Kage-Maru (影丸) Voiced by: Kiyoyuki Yanada (Japanese); Geoff Whitesell (English)

Kage is first portrayed as a mercenary who kidnaps Sarah under the orders of Eva Durix and initially clashes with Akira. While Kage is with Sarah they begin to have feelings for each other. In the middle of the series, Kage decides to assist Akira, Pai and their allies after he had a case of guilty conscience over what he had done that resulted in the creation of Dural. He had also left his Hagakure clan village to hunt down Oni-Maru after most of his people had been massacred by him, who had wanted to kill Kage in order to gain the position as the head of the Hagakure clan.

- First appears in Episode 5, "In Search of the Stars"

Wolf Hawkfield (ウルフ・ホークフィールド) Voiced by: Unshō Ishizuka

A wrestler that originally worked for Clive Maroni in a Casino.

- First appears in Episode 13, "Arena of Darkness"

Jeffry McWild (ジェフリー・マクワイルド) Voiced by: Ryuzaburo Otomo

- First appears in Episode 16, "The Sea Warrior"

Lion Rafale (リオン・ラファール) Voiced by: Tetsuya Iwanaga

A young teenage boy, the only son of a rather upper class French family. Like his counterpart in the games, he is a practitioner of Tourou-ken.

- First appears in Episode 17, "Here Comes the Prince"

Shun Di (舜帝) Voiced by: Kōichi Kitamura

- First appears in Episode 21, "A Wizard and a Master"

Liu Kowloon (リュウ・カオルン) Voiced by: Taiten Kusunoki

A rising martial arts practitioner in the Koenkan, he had plotted to use his upcoming marriage to Pai in order to become the next successor to Lau Chan as the next head of the Koenkan. Akira, Jacky and Sarah rescued Pai in Hong Kong, foiling his plot.

Oni-Maru (鬼丸) Voiced by: Toshiyuki Morikawa

A former member of the Hagakure clan, he had been expelled by the village elders due to his plot to kill off Kage-Maru in order to become the clan's head. Enraged, Oni leaves to train himself and perfect his skills. He later orchestrates a massacre of his village kin, leading Kage to hunt him down in order to exact revenge for the deaths of the Hagakure clan.

Gaô (ガオ) Voiced by: Kaneto Shiozawa

A monk that is a loyal follower and disciple of Oni-Maru. Although fighting at the side of the villains, Gaô has a mature, polite and respectful nature, and seems to follow a moral code of the fighter.

Nio Voiced by: Asako Dodo

One of the Oni-Maru lackeys.

Eva Durix (エヴァ・デュリックス) Voiced by: Atsuko Tanaka

A robotics scientist who had wanted to create the "Perfect Soldier". She had assisted Liu in brainwashing Pai so as to "marry" her without any pressure. The brainwashing fails, and after Akira, Sarah and Jacky rescued Pai from Liu and the rest of the Koenkan, Eva seeks the backing of the Rafale Corporation. She employed the mercenary ninja Kage-Maru to kidnap Sarah to use her for the basis of Dural.

- First appears in Episode 5, "In Search of the Stars"

Dural (デュラル)

Dural's origins are very different here from in the game versions; it had been created by robotics scientist Eva Durix through the backing of the Koenkan and later, the Rafale Corporation after Eva had a fallout with the Koenkan.

== Episode list ==
No.	Title	Directed by	Written by		Original release date
1	"Enter Bajiquan Akira!"; Transliteration: "Hakkyokuken no Akira tōjō!" (Japanese: 八極拳の晶 登場！)	Hideki Tonokatsu	Tsutomu Kamishiro	Hideki Tonokatsu	9 October 1995
Introducing characters: Akira Yuki, Pai Chan
2	"Cry of the Heart"; Transliteration: "Kokoro no sakebi" (Japanese: 心の叫び)	Hiroshi Matsuzono	Tsutomu Kamishiro	Hiroshi Matsuzono	16 October 1995
3	"The Gorgeous Sibling Fighters"; Transliteration: "Utsukushiki kyōdai kenshi tōjō" (Japanese: 美しき兄妹拳士登場)	Hitoyuki Matsui	Tsutomu Kamishiro	Takehiro Nakayama	23 October 1995
Introducing characters: Sarah Bryant, Jacky Bryant
4	"Showdown in Chinatown"; Transliteration: "Kessen chainataun" (Japanese: 決戦中華街(チャイナタウン))	Keitarō Motonaga	Kuniaki Kasahara	Takaaki Ishiyama	30 October 1995
5	"Seek the Stars"; Transliteration: "Hoshi o motomete" (Japanese: 星を求めて)	Shinichi Watanabe	Kuniaki Kasahara	Shinichi Watanabe	6 November 1995
Introducing characters: Kage-Maru
6	"Behind the Battle Scene"; Transliteration: "Gekitō no kage de" (Japanese: 激闘の陰で)	Takahiro Okao	Kuniaki Kasahara	Takahiro Okao	13 November 1995
7	"Fate's Twosome"; Transliteration: "Shukumei no futari" (Japanese: 宿命の二人)	Shinichi Watanabe	Natsuko Senjū	Hideki Tonokatsu	20 November 1995
8	"Sadness of the Past"; Transliteration: "Kanashī kako" (Japanese: 悲しい過去)	Yūichirō Yano	Tsutomu Kamishiro	Takaaki Ishiyama	27 November 1995
Introducing characters: Lau Chan
9	"The Wanted!"; Transliteration: "Shimei tehai!" (Japanese: 指名手配！)	Keitarō Motonaga	Tsutomu Kamishiro; Reiko Yoshida	Susumu Nishizawa	4 December 1995
10	"Death Match on the Lake"; Transliteration: "Kojō no shitō" (Japanese: 湖上の死闘)	Yūichirō Yano	Kuniaki Kasahara	Michiyo Sakurai	11 December 1995
11	"Pai's Dream"; Transliteration: "Yumemiru Pai" (Japanese: 夢みるパイ)	Yasuchika Nagaoka	Reiko Yoshida	Shinichi Watanabe	18 December 1995
12	"Subway Out of Control"; Transliteration: "Chikatetsu bōsō" (Japanese: 地下鉄暴走)	Masami Shimoda	Kuniaki Kasahara	Takaaki Ishiyama	25 December 1995
13	"Arena of Darkness"; Transliteration: "Yami no ringu" (Japanese: 闇のリング)	Yūichirō Yano	Kuniaki Kasahara	Tarō Itachibori	1 January 1996
Introducing characters: Wolf Hawkfield
14	"Aftershock"; Transliteration: "Bakuen no kanata" (Japanese: 爆炎の彼方)	Keitarō Motonaga	Tsutomu Kamishiro	Michiyo Sakurai; Hideki Tonokatsu	8 January 1996
15	"Little Princess"; Transliteration: "Chīsana maihime" (Japanese: 小さな舞姫)	Keiichirō Watanabe	Reiko Yoshida	Takaaki Ishiyama	15 January 1996
16	"The Sea Warrior"; Transliteration: "Umi no kakutōshi" (Japanese: 海の格闘士)	Shinichi Watanabe	Tsutomu Kamishiro	Shinichi Watanabe	22 January 1996
Introducing characters: Jeffry McWild
17	"Here Comes the Prince"; Transliteration: "Kikōshi tōjō" (Japanese: 貴公子登場)	Atsuko Tanaka	Kuniaki Kasahara	Michiyo Sakurai	29 January 1996
Introducing characters: Lion Rafale
18	"Sad Reunion"; Transliteration: "Hijōna saikai" (Japanese: 非情な再会)	Masami Shimoda	Reiko Yoshida	Takaaki Ishiyama	5 February 1996
19	"A New Departure"; Transliteration: "Aratana tabidachi" (Japanese: 新たな旅立)	Yoshihiro Oda	Kuniaki Kasahara	Yoshihiro Oda	19 February 1996
20	"A Bond of Love Between Brother & Sister"; Transliteration: "Kyōdai no kizuna" (Japanese: 兄妹(きょうだい)の絆)	Hideki Tonokatsu	Tsutomu Kamishiro	Hideki Tonokatsu	26 February 1996
21	"A Wizard and a Master"; Transliteration: "Sen'nin to tatsujin" (Japanese: 仙人と達人)	Naoki Hishikawa	Kuniaki Kasahara	Michiyo Sakurai	4 March 1996
Introducing characters: Shun Di
22	"Evil City Hong Kong"; Transliteration: "Mato Honkon" (Japanese: 魔都・香港)	Shinichi Watanabe	Reiko Yoshida	Shinichi Watanabe	11 March 1996
23	"Launch D."; Transliteration: "D shidō" (Japanese: D・始動)	Yoshio Suzuki	Tsutomu Kamishiro	Takaaki Ishiyama	18 March 1996
Introducing characters: Dural
24	"The Eight Stars"; Transliteration: "Yattsu no hoshi" (Japanese: 八つの星)	Naoki Hishikawa	Tsutomu Kamishiro	Takaaki Ishiyama; Hideki Tonokatsu	25 March 1996
25	"Raid! The Mysterious Ninja Corps"; Transliteration: "Shūgeki! Nazo no ninja gundan" (Japanese: 襲撃！謎の忍者軍団)	Akihiko Nishiyama; Akira Mano	Tsutomu Kamishiro	Hideki Tonokatsu	18 April 1996
26	"The Man from Hell! His Name is Onimaru!"; Transliteration: "Jigoku kara kita otoko! Sono na wa Onimaru!" (Japanese: 地獄から来た男！その名は鬼丸！)	Masahito Otani	Tsutomu Kamishiro	Shinichi Watanabe	25 April 1996
27	"Shattered Friendship!? Akira vs. Jacky"; Transliteration: "Kudake chiru yūjō!? Akira tai Jakkī" (Japanese: 砕け散る友情！？晶対ジャッキー)	Akira Mano; Masami Furukawa	Kuniaki Kasahara	Takaaki Ishiyama	2 May 1996
28	"The Approaching Giant Shadow! The Dangerous Rion"; Transliteration: "Semaru kyodai na kage! Rion ayaushi" (Japanese: 迫る巨大な影！リオン危うし)	Naoki Hishikawa	Tsutomu Kamishiro	Naoki Hishikawa	9 May 1996
29	"The Targeted Ring! Save Wolf"; Transliteration: "Nerawa reta ringu! Urufu o sukue" (Japanese: 狙われたリング！ウルフを救え)	Masahito Otani	Kuniaki Kasahara	Hiroshi Matsuzono	16 May 1996
30	"Pai Chan the Actress"; Transliteration: "Joyū Pai Chen" (Japanese: 女優パイ・チェン)	Akihiko Nishiyama	Tsutomu Kamishiro	Hideki Tonokatsu	23 May 1996
31	"Become Enraged, Jeffrey! The Ruthless Trap"; Transliteration: "Okore Jefurī! Hijō no wana" (Japanese: 怒れジェフリー！非情の罠)	Hiroshi Ishiodori	Tsutomu Kamishiro	Takaaki Ishiyama	30 May 1996
32	"Life or Death! The Onimaru Corps' Last Battle"; Transliteration: "Sei ka shi ka! Onimaru gundan saigo no tatakai" (Japanese: 生か死か！鬼丸軍団最後の闘い)	Masami Furukawa	Kuniaki Kasahara	Naoki Hishikawa	6 June 1996
33	"Let Out the Fist's Soul! Akira vs. Onimaru!"; Transliteration: "Unare tamashī no ken! Akira tai Onimaru!" (Japanese: 唸れ魂の拳！晶対鬼丸！)	Naoto Kanda	Ryō Tamura	Naoto Kanda	13 June 1996
34	"Activate! The Strongest Dural Plan?!"; Transliteration: "Hatsudō! Duraru saikyōka keikaku!?" (Japanese: 発動！デュラル最強化計画！？)	Masahito Otani	Katsuhiko Koide	Shinichi Watanabe	20 June 1996
35	"The Final Battle! Burn Up, Fist of Friendship"; Transliteration: "Saishū kessen! Moeagare yūjō no ken" (Japanese: 最終決戦！燃え上がれ友情の拳)	Hideki Tonokatsu	Tsutomu Kamishiro	Hideki Tonokatsu	27 June 1996

== Licensing ==
Virtua Fighter had been aired in various television stations in Argentina, Chile, Italy, Mexico, the Philippines and the Arabic part of the Middle East, dubbed in their national languages. The series had been licensed for distribution in North America by Anime Works. Due to falling sales, Anime Works had ended its distribution of the Virtua Fighter anime after dubbing 24 of the 35 episodes, and no other licensor would pick up the series until 2022 when Discotek Media announced they picked up the rights for the anime and will release it on Blu-Ray. This will include the first 24 episode that have the English dub while the rest will have Japanese translations.

RetroCrush announced that the first season would be streamed with English subtitles provided.

== Reception ==
Hanami Gumi had praised the Virtua Fighter anime series, calling it "one of the best among those anime series that had fighting-game origins". The review said that the show had a clear, non-confusing plot, along with good characterization and background music. Asian Stuff has praised the series for its plot, saying "the fights don't drag on and that it doesn't resort to repetitive tournament crap".

An EX review had commented highly on Ryo Tanaka's character designs in the series, as they are "simple yet very effective in revealing the nature of the characters."

== Legacy ==
A tie-in home exclusive game based on the series, Virtua Fighter Animation, was released in 1996.
