= Virtua Fighter =

Video game series

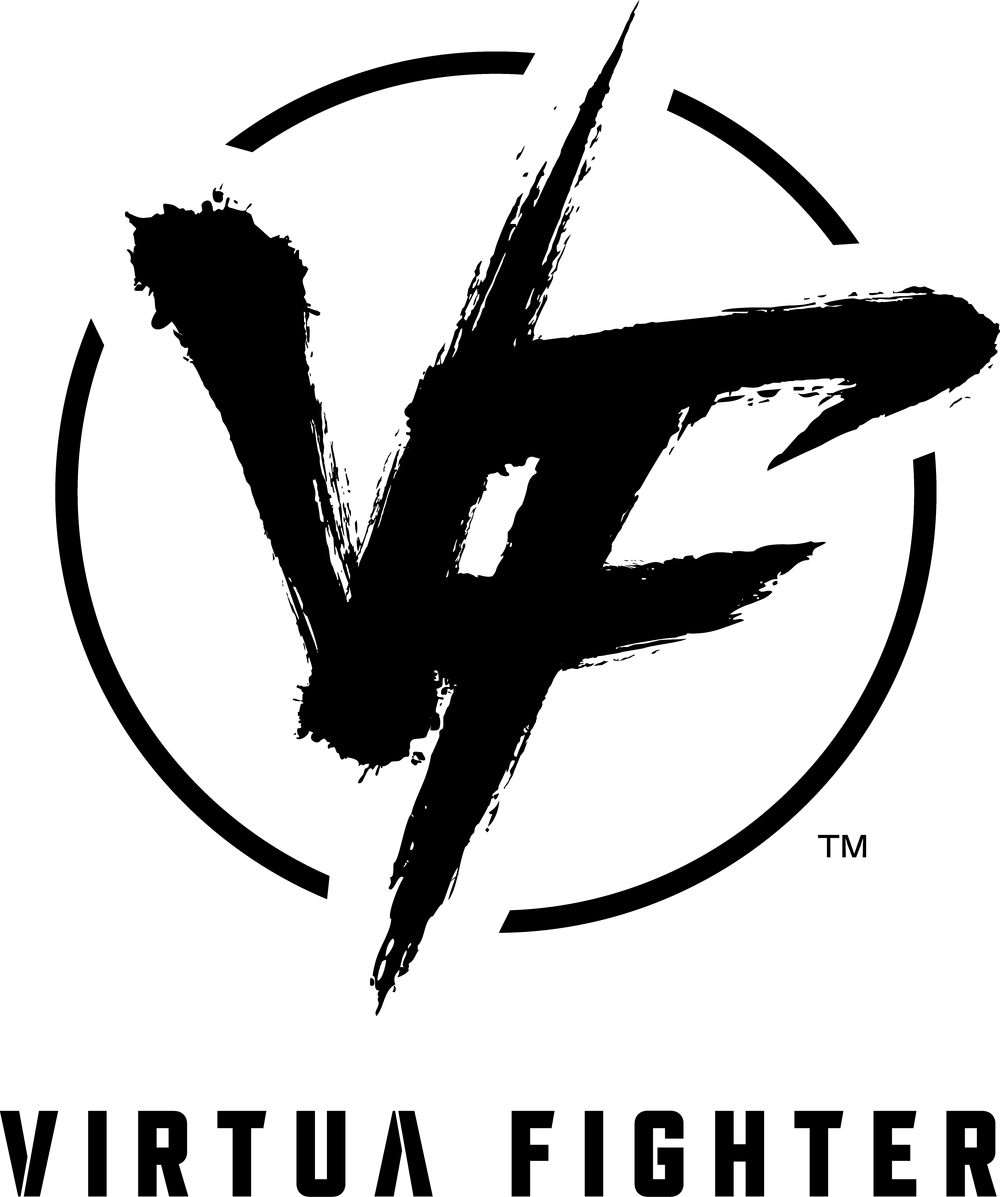
- Logo used since 2024
- Genre: Fighting
- Developers: Sega AM2; Genki; Aspect; Tose; RGG Studio
- Publisher: Sega
- Creator: Yu Suzuki
- Platforms: Arcade, Sega Saturn, 32X, Microsoft Windows, Mega Drive, Game Gear, Master System, Game.com, R-Zone, Dreamcast, PlayStation 2, GameCube, PlayStation 3, Virtual Console, Xbox 360, mobile, PlayStation 4, PlayStation 5, Xbox Series X/S, Nintendo Switch 2
- First release: Virtua Fighter; October 1993
- Latest release: Virtua Fighter 5 R.E.V.O. January 2025
- Spin-offs: Fighters Megamix; Virtua Quest; Anime series

Virtua Fighter (Note: Japanese: バーチャファイター, Hepburn: Bāchafaitā) is a series of fighting games created by Sega AM2 and designer Yu Suzuki. The original Virtua Fighter was released in December 1993 and has received four main sequels and several Spin-offs. The highly influential first Virtua Fighter game is widely recognized as the first 3D fighting game released.

== Gameplay ==
The default gameplay system of the Virtua Fighter series involves two combatants needing to win two of three rounds, with each round being 30 seconds long or more. Combatants utilize various attacks in an attempt to deplete the other fighter's stamina gauge and deal a knockout (K.O.), winning a round. If a character is knocked out (or falls out) of the ring, their opponent wins the round in a Ring Out. An extra round is necessary if a double knockout (both players knocking each other out at the same time) occurs in a previous round and the match is tied one round each. In this round, players fight on a small stage wherein one hit is enough to knock the other out and achieve victory.

The basic control scheme uses an 8-way control stick and three buttons (Punch, Kick, Guard). Through various timings, positions, and button combinations, players input normal and special moves for each character. This allows extensive lists of moves to exist for a given character within the limited control scheme. Traditionally, in the single-player mode, the player runs a gauntlet of characters in the game (which may include one's doppelgänger) all the way to the final boss.

== List of games ==
The following is a list of games in the Virtua Fighter series:

=== Main Series ===
Title	Platform(s)
Virtua Fighter	Original: Arcade (1993), Sega Saturn (1994), 32X (1995), Mobile (J2ME) (2008, titled Virtua Fighter Mobile 3D) Remix: Arcade (1995), Saturn (1995), Windows (1996, titled Virtua Fighter PC) 10th Anniversary: PlayStation 2 (2003)
Virtua Fighter 2	Original: Arcade (1994), Sega Genesis (1996) 2.1: Arcade (1995), Saturn (1995), Windows (1997), PlayStation 2 (2004), Xbox 360 (2012), PlayStation 3 (2012)
Virtua Fighter 3	Original: Arcade (1996) 3tb: Arcade (1997), Dreamcast (1998) 3tb Online: Arcade (2023)
Virtua Fighter 4	Original: Arcade (2001), PlayStation 2 (2002) Evolution: Arcade (2002), PlayStation 2 (2003) Final Tuned: Arcade (2004)
Virtua Fighter 5	Original: Arcade (2006) Version A: Arcade (2006) Version B: Arcade (2006), PlayStation 3 (2007) Version C/Online: Arcade (2007), Xbox 360 (2007) R: Arcade (2008) R, Version A: Arcade (2008) R, Version B: Arcade (2009) R, Version C: Arcade (2009) Final Showdown: Arcade (2010) Final Showdown, Version A: Arcade (2010), Xbox 360 (2012), PlayStation 3 (2012), PlayStation 4 (2016) (Note: As a mini-game at the various arcades available in Yakuza 6: The Song of Life, making it the first time the game has been natively playable on the platform.), Xbox One (2016), Xbox Series X/S (2020) (Note: A fully rewritten port of the version A, playable at the various arcades in Yakuza: Like A Dragon and the game is also available as an Xbox 360 backwards compatible title with optimization for the Xbox One X featuring higher resolution and level of detail.) Final Showdown, Version B: Arcade (2015) Ultimate Showdown: Arcade (2021), PlayStation 4 (2021) Ultimate Showdown, Ver. 2.0/R.E.V.O.: Arcade (2024), PlayStation 4 (2024), Windows (2025) R.E.V.O. World Stage: Windows (2025), PlayStation 5 (2025), Xbox Series X/S (2025), Nintendo Switch 2 (2026)
Virtua Fighter Crossroads	2027

=== Spin-off games and other titles ===
Title	Platform(s)
Virtua Fighter CG Portrait Series	Saturn (1996)
Virtua Fighter Animation	Game Gear (1996), Master System (1997)
Virtua Fighter Kids	Arcade (1996), Saturn (1996)
Fighters Megamix	Saturn (1996)
Virtua Quest	GameCube (2004), PlayStation 2 (2004)
Virtua Fighter: Cool Champ	Mobile (2011)
Virtua Fighter: Fever Combo	Mobile (2014)

== History ==
=== Arcade fighting games ===
The brainchild of Sega AM2's Yu Suzuki, Virtua Fighter was released in 1993 as an arcade game using hardware jointly developed by aerospace simulation technology by the company that is now known as Lockheed Martin and Sega's most prominent and well known studio AM2, originally crafted for the arcade system dubbed the Model 1. It is considered the first polygon-based fighting game. It introduced the eight initial fighters as well as the boss, Dural. Sony developers have confirmed that the game inspired Sony to create the first PlayStation console and to focus more on 3D games, more so than the main competitor in Japan, the Sega Saturn.

Virtua Fighter 2 was released in November 1994, adding two new fighters: Shun Di and Lion Rafale. It was built using the Model 2 hardware, rendering characters and backgrounds with filtered texture mapping and motion capture. A slightly tweaked upgrade, Virtua Fighter 2.1, followed soon after.

Virtua Fighter 3 came out in 1996, with the introduction of Taka-Arashi and Aoi Umenokoji. Aside from improving the graphics via use of the Model 3 (such as mipmapping, multi-layer anti-aliasing, trilinear filtering and specular highlighting), the game also introduced undulations in some stages and a fourth button, Dodge. Virtua Fighter 3tb in 1997 was the first major update in series history, implementing tournament battles featuring more than two characters (though not simultaneously as in the Dead or Alive games and Tekken Tag Tournament).

Virtua Fighter 4, which introduced Vanessa Lewis and Lei-Fei and removed Taka-Arashi, was released on the NAOMI 2 hardware in 2001 instead of hardware from a joint collaboration with Lockheed Martin. The game also removed the uneven battlegrounds and the Dodge button from the previous game. The title is consistently popular in its home arcade market. Virtua Fighter 4: Evolution, released in 2002, was the first update to add new characters, these being Brad Burns and Goh Hinogami. Virtua Fighter 4: Final Tuned, an upgrade to Evolution, was released in the arcades in 2004. In Japan, Virtua Fighter 4 was famous for spearheading and opening the market for internet functionality in arcades. VF.NET started in Japan in 2001, and since companies have created their own arcade networks, E-Amusement by Konami, NESiCAxLive by Taito and Square Enix, and ALL.Net by Sega.

Virtua Fighter 5 was released in Japan on July 12, 2006, for Sega's Lindbergh arcade board and introduced yet two more new characters, Eileen and El Blaze. Similar to its predecessor, two revisions were later released. Virtua Fighter 5 R, released on July 24, 2008, saw the return of Taka-Arashi while introducing a new fighter, Jean Kujo. Virtua Fighter 5 Final Showdown was released in arcades on July 29, 2010. Virtua Fighter 5 Ultimate Showdown (known in Japan as Virtua Fighter eSports) was released for Sega ALLs cabinet on June 2, 2021, a day after PlayStation 4 version's release.

=== Console fighting games ===
Virtua Fighter on the 32X

The first Virtua Fighter game was ported to the Saturn in 1994 (1995 outside Japan), just months before fellow 3D-fighter Tekken was released. The console port, which was nearly identical to the arcade game, sold at a nearly 1:1 ratio with the Saturn hardware at launch. The port of Virtua Fighter 2 on the Saturn for Christmas 1995 was considered faithful to the arcade original. While the game's 3D backgrounds were now rendered in 2D, resulting in some scenery such as the bridge in Shun Di's river stage being removed, the remainder of the game was kept intact. It became the top-selling Saturn game in Japan. Ports of the original Virtua Fighter and Virtua Fighter 2 with enhanced graphics were also released for the PC. Virtua Fighter 2 was remade as a 2D fighter for the Mega Drive/Genesis in 1996, omitting the characters Shun and Lion, and later re-released on the PlayStation 2 as a part of the Sega Ages series. Yakuza 5 was released in 2012 in Japan and in 2015 worldwide and features Virtua Fighter 2 as a mini-game. The only port of Virtua Fighter 3 was for the Sega Dreamcast by Genki (instead of AM2) with Virtua Fighter 3tb in 1998 for the Japanese release of the console.

Virtua Fighter Animation on the Master System

In a reverse of the usual development cycle for the series, an update of the original Virtua Fighter called Virtua Fighter Remix was released for the Saturn and later ported to the arcade.

Virtua Fighter Mini, based on the anime series, was created for the Game Gear and released in North America and Europe as Virtua Fighter Animation. The game was later ported to the Master System by Tec Toy and released only in Brazil. Brazil itself was a market where the series was very popular.

Following Sega's exit from the hardware market in mid-2001, Virtua Fighter 4 was ported by Sega to the PlayStation 2 in 2002. Outside of a slight downgrade in graphics, the port of the game was considered well done. This port was followed by Virtua Fighter 4: Evolution, an update that added two new characters as well as a host of game balancing tweaks, in 2003. Evolution was immediately released under the PlayStation 2's "Greatest Hits" label in the United States, which lowered its initial sticker price.

With the 2003 PlayStation 2 release of Virtua Fighter 4: Evolution arriving in time for the series' tenth anniversary, a remake of Virtua Fighter, Virtua Fighter 10th Anniversary, was released exclusively on the PlayStation 2. While the music, stages and low-polygon visual style were retained from the first game, the character roster, animations, mechanics and movesets were taken from Evolution. In the previous PS2 release of Virtua Fighter 4, a button code would make the player's character look like a VF1 model. In Japan, the game was included as part of a box set with a book titled Virtua Fighter 10th Anniversary: Memory of a Decade and a DVD. The box set was released in November 2003 and was published by Enterbrain. In North America, the game was included within the home version of Evolution, and in Europe it was only available as a promotional item; it was not sold at retail.

A port of Virtua Fighter 5 was released for the PlayStation 3 in Japan and North America in February 2007, and March 2007 in Europe. The PlayStation 3 port is considered extremely faithful to the arcade original, due in part to the arcade hardware (based on Sega Lindbergh platform) and PlayStation 3 hardware sharing NVidia-provided GPUs of comparable capability. A port for the Xbox 360 was released in October 2007 in Japan and North America, and December 2007 in Europe, and contains the additions of online fighting via Xbox Live, improved graphics, and gameplay balances from the newer revision of the arcade game. For years, the designers have held strong on their refusal to add an online mode to console versions of the games; because the gameplay relies so much on timing, any lag would ruin the experience. Eventually, with the Xbox 360 release of VF5, Sega decided to add online capabilities via Xbox Live. Virtua Fighter 5 Final Showdown was released as a downloadable title for the Xbox 360 and PlayStation 3 in June 2012, with online play available in both versions. An updated version of Virtua Fighter 5 Final Showdown named Version B was released in Japanese arcades in 2015. Yakuza 6: The Song of Life was released for PlayStation 4 in 2016 in Japan and 2018 worldwide and the game features Virtua Fighter 5 Final Showdown Version B as a mini-game, making the release of Yakuza 6 also the PlayStation 4 debut for the Virtua Fighter series. Virtua Fighter Ultimate Showdown (known as Virtua Fighter eSports in Japan), a remake which also serves as a final update version of the fifth game's sub-series was co-developed with Ryu Ga Gotoku Studio, and released in both PlayStation 4 and Arcade versions in the first two days of June 2021, respectively, with its night generation console title Virtua Fighter 5 R.E.V.O. based on recent update of the previous, in additions to rollback netcode and crossplay released in January 2025 for Windows before being set to be released on PlayStation 5, Xbox Series X/S and Nintendo Switch 2.

At The Game Awards 2024, SEGA and Ryu Ga Gotoku Studio announced a sixth installment titled Virtua Fighter Crossroads. A digital event called Virtua Fighter Direct happening later that same night revealed more about the game in development, including a full look at the models of Akira and a new character named Stella Bridge, followed by Wolf and a silhouette of another new character, Cielo Salinas in EVO Japan 2025. According to Famitsu interview with Ryu ga Gotoku Studio representative Yokoyama and producer Yamada, the new Virtua Fighter is in talk to have a story mode, which eventually confirmed at Summer Fest 2026 as the first time in the mainline series, as well as being the first game to be rated for mature audiences. Additionally, the new Virtua Fighter is confirmed to be designed for home releases, with Windows version is mentioned to be one of the planned ports. According to the interview, it is revealed that a Ryu ga Gotoku studio member, Seiji Aoki had been appointed to solely produce re-released versions of previous Virtua Fighter games, as he is not involved in the developing sixth Virtua Fighter game.

=== Spin-offs and adaptations ===
Due to the success of Virtua Fighter 2, a super deformed version called Virtua Fighter Kids was released for the Sega Saturn and arcades in 1996. 1996 also saw the release of Fighters Megamix for the Sega Saturn, a crossover that pitted the cast of Virtua Fighter 2 against the cast of Fighting Vipers as well as other characters in AM2-developed games. Megamix served as a home preview to Virtua Fighter 3 in a few ways, as the game featured the dodge ability found in VF3 and the Virtua Fighter characters had their moves updated to those found in VF3. Some stages and music from VF3 are also in the game. The Virtua Fighter Kids versions of Akira and Sarah appear as hidden playable characters in the game; the character Siba, who was omitted from the first Virtua Fighter also appears as a hidden playable character. The wrestling video game All-Japan Pro Wrestling Featuring Virtua was released for the Saturn in 1997 and ported to arcades later that year. Released only in Japan, it features Jeffrey and Wolf in addition to an assortment of Japanese wrestlers as playable characters.

In 1996, AM2 began developing a Saturn RPG, Virtua Fighter RPG: Akira's Story, with Akira as the hero. Development moved to the Dreamcast, the Virtua Fighter connection was dropped and the game became Shenmue, released in 1999. Virtua Quest, a simplified role-playing video game (which was also known in Japan as Virtua Fighter Cyber Generation: Ambition of the Judgement Six) with new characters aimed at the children's market, was released for the GameCube in 2004 and the PlayStation 2 in 2005. The Virtua Fighters had their incarnations from Virtua Fighter 4.

During the late 2000s, both Sega and Namco showed interest in a possible cross over between Virtua Fighter and Tekken. This crossover would combine all the characters and fighting styles from both games, but any other inclusions are unknown at the moment. Prior to that, both franchises were represented as Mii Brawler costumes in the Nintendo crossover Super Smash Bros. for 3DS and Wii U, in which Ryu from the Street Fighter series first playable too, whereas Akira himself (based on 10th Anniversary version) physically appeared in the sequel Super Smash Bros. Ultimate as an assist trophy character where Kazuya Mishima from Tekken, including Ken Masters as Ryu's echo fighter first playable too.

=== Other media ===
A 35 episodes-long anime television series Virtua Fighter was produced by Tōkyō Movie Shinsha, originally airing on TV Tokyo between 1995 and 1996. In 1995, Shogakukan began publishing a Virtua Fighter 2 manga, with creative oversight from Sega AM2 to ensure the characters were portrayed consistently with their original vision. The games' manga adaptation was written by Kyōichi Nanatsuki and illustrated by Yoshihide Fujiwara starting in 1997. In Japan, Virtua Fighter CG Portrait Series, wherein each character in the series had their own Saturn CD showcasing various poses of the fighter, was released around the same time as well. People who collected all the discs could send in their proof of purchases to get a special Portrait CD of Dural. In 2014, Sega formed the production company Stories International for film and TV projects based on their games with Virtua Fighter as an animated project.

The first Virtua Fighter merchandise was a set of dolls of the first Virtua Fighter cast which Sega produced for their UFO Catchers (a model of claw crane). These proved so popular that supplies ran out almost immediately, so Sega made additional batches and began producing other Virtua Fighter merchandise to put in the UFO Catchers. When these also proved successful, Sega realized that Virtua Fighter merchandise had mainstream potential, and began licensing the property to merchandise producers such as Bandai.

Sega has also released soundtrack CDs for the games, and an album of original theme music for the characters called Dancing Shadows.

== Characters ==
Character	1	2	3	4	5	Crossroads
Akira Yuki	Yes	Yes	Yes	Yes	Yes	Yes
Pai Chan	Yes	Yes	Yes	Yes	Yes	Yes
Lau Chan	Yes	Yes	Yes	Yes	Yes	TBD
Wolf Hawkfield	Yes	Yes	Yes	Yes	Yes	Yes
Jeffry McWild	Yes	Yes	Yes	Yes	Yes	TBD
Kage-Maru	Yes	Yes	Yes	Yes	Yes	TBD
Sarah Bryant	Yes	Yes	Yes	Yes	Yes	TBD
Jacky Bryant	Yes	Yes	Yes	Yes	Yes	TBD
Dural	Yes	Yes	Yes	Yes	Yes (Note: Non-playable boss in Ultimate Showdown and R.E.V.O., and DLC in World Stage)	TBD
Shun Di	No	Yes	Yes	Yes	Yes	TBD
Lion Rafale	No	Yes	Yes	Yes	Yes	TBD
Aoi Umenokoji	No	No	Yes	Yes	Yes	TBD
Taka-Arashi	No	No	Yes	No	Yes (Note: Added in 5 R)	TBD
Lei-Fei	No	No	No	Yes	Yes	TBD
Vanessa Lewis	No	No	No	Yes	Yes	TBD
Brad Burns	No	No	No	Yes (Note: Added in Evolution)	Yes	TBD
Goh Hinogami	No	No	No	Yes	Yes	TBD
Eileen	No	No	No	No	Yes	TBD
El Blaze	No	No	No	No	Yes	TBD
Jean Kujo	No	No	No	No	Yes	TBD
Cielo Salinas	No	No	No	No	No	Yes
Stella Bridge	No	No	No	No	No	Yes
Bakunawa Killer	No	No	No	No	No	Yes
Lionel Rafale	No	No	No	No	No	Yes

=== Introduced in Virtua Fighter ===
Name	Description
Akira Yuki	Akira Yuki (結城 晶, Yūki Akira) is the mascot of the Virtua Fighter video game series, and fights using Bajiquan. He is an assistant teacher of his family's dojo, and currently seeks worthy opponents to fight in order to find flaws in his skills and further attain mastery. He continued to search for strong opponents even after winning the Virtua Fighter 2 tournament, thanks to his grandfather's advice.
Pai Chan	Pai Chan (パイ・チェン, Pai Chen) is the daughter of Lau Chan, and a martial arts action movie star in her home town, fighting using Mizongyi. She seeks to defeat her father and prove herself a worthy successor to his school of martial arts. She was initially hostile towards her father for neglecting her until Virtua Fighter 4, where she reconciled with him after finding out he has been diagnosed with an incurable disease.
Lau Chan	Lau Chan (ラウ・チェン, Rau Chen) is a restaurant chef and martial artist skilled in Huyanquan (虎燕拳, Koen-ken; lit. Tiger Swallow Fist). After winning the first tournament in Virtua Fighter, he seeks a successor for his martial arts style before an incurable illness he is diagnosed with in Virtua Fighter 4 begins to take a toll of his body. Nevertheless, his disease does not negatively affect his fighting skill.
Wolf Hawkfield	Wolf Hawkfield (ウルフ・ホークフィールド, Urufu Hōkufīrudo) is a Canadian professional wrestler of Native American descent. He entered the tournament seeking worthy opponents, and ultimately found one in the form of Akira Yuki, whom Wolf befriended. After Virtua Fighter 2, Wolf begins to investigate J6's connection to his recent recurring apocalyptic nightmare, when he witnessed a Dural competitor interfering in a tournament match during Virtua Fighter 4.
Jeffry McWild	Jeffry McWild (ジェフリー・マクワイルド, Jefurī Makuwairudo) is an Australian Aboriginal fisherman and Pankration practitioner. He seeks the tournament prize money for equipment to hunt a massive "Satan Shark", which later fell into J6's hands.
Kage-Maru	Kage-Maru (影丸, Kagemaru) is a tenth generation ninja of Hagakure (葉隠) clan and the son of his two last predecessors. After J6 kidnapped his mother Tsukikage - the eighth generation ninja - and turned her into the first Dural, the group both murdered his father - the ninth generation ninja - and destroyed their village. Due to this, Kage-Maru seeks revenge and vows to rescue his mother. After Virtua Fighter 2, when Tsukikage temporarily returned to her normal self, Kage discovered the after effects of her Dural transformation, leaving him with no other option but to transform her back into a Dural at the end of Virtua Fighter 3, and put her out of her misery when they meet again in later tournaments. He is the only fighter to win two tournaments between Virtua Fighter 3 and 4.
Sarah Bryant	Sarah Bryant (Japanese: サラ・ブライアント, Hepburn: Sara Buraianto) is a college student from Los Angeles and a younger sister of Jacky. She fights using three martial arts consisting of Jeet Kune Do (like her brother), Savate and Karate. While investigating Jacky's car crash, J6 kidnaps her, and exploit her former jealousy towards her brother's success in order to brainwashing her. In Virtua Fighter 2, the group has her try and kill Jacky at their tournament; however, she ultimately fails to do so. After Sarah was rescued, J6 reveals to have been planning to turn her into a vessel of Dural, as part of their animosity towards the Bryants. In response, the family hired Vanessa Lewis to serve as Sarah's bodyguard.
Jacky Bryant	Jacky Bryant (ジャッキー・ブライアント, Jakkī Buraianto) is an Indy race car driver that fights using Jeet Kune Do. After J6 attempted to kill him with a car crash at the 1990 Indianapolis 500, his sister Sarah investigated them only to be kidnapped and brainwashed. Jacky seeks to rescue his sister, which he ultimately does at the end of Virtua Fighter 2. Nevertheless, the Bryant siblings' fight against J6 continues, as the organization remains at large to terrorize their family.
Dural	Dural (デュラル, Dyuraru) is a Gynoid-like cyborg and serves as the final boss in every Virtua Fighter game, utilizing a mixture of attacks from all the other characters. There are four known Durals within the main tournaments: The first Dural was originally Kage-Maru's mother, Tsukikage (月影), the eight generation Hagakure ninja. She was kidnapped by J6 and turned into Dural when they noticed her exemplary fighting ability. After being defeated by Akira in Virtua Fighter 2, Tsukikage was temporarily freed. But the after-effects from her Dural transformation caused her to go ill, and were only able to be cured by metal pieces of Dural.; The second Dural was a robot duplicate destroyed by Kage-Maru at the end of Virtua Fighter 3, who took its metal pieces to cure his mother Tsukikage. However, this instead turned her back into a Dural.; The third Dural in Virtua Fighter 4 was initially thought by Kage-Maru to be a re-transformed Tsukikage, though later revealed to be another robot double. It interfered in the final match between Kage-Maru and Shun Di before being destroyed by the former. Wolf, who is currently haunted by his nightmare, was present during the final match. This lead him to speculate J6's connection with his recurring nightmares.; The fourth Dural in Virtua Fighter 5 is a robot dubbed V-Dural. Its combat is mostly derived from Vanessa Lewis, whom J6 temporarily recaptured before she escaped thanks to a double agent within the organization. Similar to Vanessa, it is a stance character able to switch between a fast, agile form based on the smaller characters and a stronger, powerful form based on the larger characters.

=== Introduced in Virtua Fighter 2 ===
Name	Description
Shun Di	Shun Di (Chinese: 舜帝 Pinyin: Shùn Dì, Japanese: シュン・ディ Shun Di) is an herbal doctor from China that uses Drunken boxing. Considered a sage, he teaches in his small training hall and had many students. However, when most of his students left the dojo, with one going missing, he decided to enter the tournament after hearing his friends boasting, as well as to find his missing student. This same student is later revealed to be on the run from J6.
Lion Rafale	Lion Rafale (リオン・ラファール, Rion Rafāru) is a student from France that fights in order to gain independence from his wealthy father, and uses the style of Praying Mantis Kung Fu. During Virtua Fighter 4, after graduating from high school and entering college, Lion stumbles upon his father's connection with J6, and becomes suspicious of the relationship between the two.

=== Introduced in Virtua Fighter 3 ===
Name	Description
Aoi Umenokoji	Aoi Umenokoji (梅小路 葵, Umenokōji Aoi) is the eldest child of a dojo owner in Kyoto, and fights with Aiki Ju-Jutsu. She joined the tournament in order to test herself, much like her childhood friend Akira Yuki.
Taka-Arashi	Taka-Arashi (鷹嵐, Takaarashi) is a sumo wrestler from Japan. During development of Virtua Fighter 3, his large size caused difficulties when jumping, and further caused him to be omitted from Virtua Fighter 4 sub-series and original Virtua Fighter 5 because his large size was deemed too difficult to simulate at the time until the release of Virtua Fighter 5 R. In the Sumo world, Taka-Arashi is famous for his unusually brutal version of the fighting style. Because of his absence in Virtua Fighter 4 by the developer's apparent reason affecting his return in Virtua Fighter 5 R, Taka-Arashi briefly went into exile because of his loss to experienced fighters in the third tournament, until he met his ex-worker of his former stable, now his new sumo coach, who helped him reignite his fighting spirit.

=== Introduced in Virtua Fighter 4 and Virtua Fighter 4: Evolution ===
Name	Description
Vanessa Lewis	Vanessa Lewis (ベネッサ・ルイス, Benessa Ruisu) is a security guard, and fights using Vale Tudo. After being rescued from J6, Vanessa acts as Sarah's bodyguard after hearing they intend to re-capture her. She enters the tournament in order to both protect Sarah, and find the killer of the person who rescued her; said rescuer's last name is Lewis. Vanessa was temporarily captured by J6 for their V-Dural project at the end of Virtua Fighter 4, but escaped from them once again thanks to a double agent within the organization.
Lei-Fei	Lei-Fei (Chinese:雷飛; Pinyin: Léi Fēi, Japanese:レイ・フェイ, Rei Fei) is a Shaolin monk from China. Part of a clan ordered by an ancient Chinese emperor to kill anyone capable of martial arts techniques more powerful than the emperor's own, he enters the tournament to test his skills against Lau Chan, in order to learn Huyanquan's secrets. He then plans to dispose of him.
Brad Burns	Brad Burns (ブラッド・バーンズ, Buraddo Bānzu) is a Muay Thai fighter from Italy who debuted in Virtua Fighter 4 Evolution. Popular with women for his looks and personality, he enters the tournament due to his enjoyment of the thrill of fighting.
Goh Hinogami	Goh Hinogami (日守 剛, Hinogami Gō) is an enigmatic assassin for J6 who fights with Judo and debuted in Virtua Fighter 4 Evolution. A sadist due to the death of his father and J6's training, he often taunts his opponents and was introduced as a rival to Akira Yuki. He was defeated by Jacky at the end of Virtua Fighter 4 and subsequently decided to get revenge against him in Virtua Fighter 5. He is the only playable J6 agent who is not brainwashed. In Virtua Fighter 10th Anniversary, he is the final boss when playing in the Evolution order.

=== Introduced in Virtua Fighter 5 and Virtua Fighter 5: R ===
Name	Description
Eileen	Eileen (アイリーン, Airīn) is a young Chinese girl who works as an Opera performer at Beijing. After losing her parents at a young age, she was raised and taught by her grandfather, a Hou Quan master. She is captivated by a martial arts exhibition by Pai Chan and enters the tournament in order to meet her.
El Blaze	El Blaze (エル・ブレイズ, Eru Bureizu) is a light-heavyweighted heel wrestler from Mexico who fights with Lucha Libre. As he watched Wolf dominate the heavyweight division, he grew envious and entered the tournament in order to confront him.
Jean Kujo	Jean Kujo (ジャン 紅條, Jan Kujō) is a French full-contact (Kyokushin) karate fighter of Japanese descent, who debuted in Virtua Fighter 5 R. An assassin of J6 who was presumably brainwashed by them, he enters the tournament in order to prove his worth. He targets Lion Rafale specifically, likely unaware that they used to be best friends until Jean disappeared and his house was demolished at the same time of their graduation from school.

=== Introduced in Virtua Fighter Crossroads ===
Name	Description
Cielo Salinas	Cielo Salinas (シエロ・サリナス, Shiero Sarinasu) is a young Paraguayan MMA fighter and one of the four protagonists of the game. He is also one of the regular customers of a restaurant secretly owned by Pai Chan.
Stella Bridge	Stella Bridge (ステッラ・ブリッジ, Suterra Burijji) is an American kickboxer who resembles Sarah Bryant and one of the four protagonists of the game.
Bakunawa Killer	An unidentified masked man who goes by Bakunawa Killer utilizes similar fighting styles as both Lau Chan and Lei-Fei. He is not registered in the tournaments held at Vilasapara, but is tied to the violent incidents around the town.
Lionel Rafale	The son of a veteran fighter Lion Rafale, Lionel Rafale (リオネル・ブリッジ, Rioneru Rafare) join the tournament at Vilasapara for a thrill, and have since perfected his Mantis Kung Fu.

=== In other games ===
In Sega's music video game Project DIVA 2nd, Vocaloid Megurine Luka can obtain a Sarah Bryant outfit for gameplay. Jacky Bryant and Akira Yuki appear in Sonic & Sega All-Stars Racing as partners competing against other Sega characters in races. Akira Yuki, Sarah Bryant and Pai Chan, appear as guest characters in Tecmo Koei's Dead or Alive 5, followed by Jacky Bryant in Dead or Alive 5 Ultimate, marking the first time Virtua Fighter collaborated with a non-Sega fighting game series and for the series to be featured in a tag-team fighting game. Akira Yuki, Pai Chan and Dural appear in the crossover RPG Project X Zone, which features characters from Capcom, Namco Bandai Games, and Sega. Akira Yuki, Pai Chan and Dural return in Project X Zone 2 along with Kage-Maru. In Dengeki Bunko Fighting Climax, Akira Yuki and Pai Chan appears as a playable guest boss where Akira is playable and Pai as assist, though they became regulars in the Ignition update. In Super Smash Bros. for Nintendo 3DS and Wii U and Super Smash Bros. Ultimate, Mii Brawler costumes based on Jacky Bryant's modern appearance and Akira Yuki's first appearance were released as downloadable content. Akira would also appear in Ultimate as an assist trophy in his appearance in Virtua Fighter 10th Anniversary (a polygonal form from the first game with both voice lines and a move set from Virtua Fighter 4 Evolution).

Virtua Fighter 2, 2.1, 3tb, and Virtua Fighter 5: Final Showdown have been near fully-recreated within the Yakuza series of games, as both a playable game inside the in-game arcades and a separate 1 versus 1 multiplayer minigame. Within the game files of Yakuza: Like a Dragon and Yakuza 6, a near full version of Virtua Fighter 5 exists.

== Reception ==
The original Virtua Fighter sold more than 40,000 arcade units worldwide by 1996, with each unit costing between $15,000 (equivalent to $33,000 in 2025) and £14,000 / $21,000 (equivalent to $47,000 in 2025). Virtua Fighter 2 also sold more than 40,000 arcade units worldwide, adding up to more than 80,000 unit sales of both games by 1996. Virtua Fighter and Virtua Fighter 2 became Sega's best-selling arcade games of all time, surpassing Out Run (1986), which itself had sold 30,000 arcade cabinets by 1994. Virtua Fighter 3 sold a further 30,000 arcade cabinets by 1997, adding up to 110,000 arcade unit sales for the three games combined by 1997.

In 1994, Virtua Fighter was the year's highest-grossing arcade game in Japan, one of the year's top five highest-grossing arcade video games in the United States, and one of the year's most popular coin-ops in the United Kingdom. In 1995, Virtua Fighter 2 was the year's highest-grossing arcade game in Japan, and one of the year's top ten best-selling arcade games in the United States.

On the Sega Saturn, Virtua Fighter and Virtua Fighter 2 combined had sold more than 3 million copies worldwide by 1996. Virtua Fighter and Virtua Fighter Remix sold a combined 1,067,036 copies in Japan. Virtua Fighter 2 sold 1.7 million copies in Japan, and more than 500,000 bundled copies in the United States, for a combined 2.2 million copies sold in Japan and the United States. On the Sega Dreamcast, Virtua Fighter 3tb sold 330,631 copies in Japan and 96,390 copies in the United States, for a combined 427,021 copies sold in Japan and the United States.

On the PlayStation 2, Virtua Fighter 4 sold over 1.5 million copies worldwide by 2002. On the Xbox 360 and PlayStation 3, Virtua Fighter 5 Final Showdown reached over 300,000 global downloads worldwide across both platforms in 2012. On the PlayStation 4, the limited free-to-play offer of Virtua Fighter 5 Ultimate Showdown reached over 10 million global downloads worldwide in 2021.

As of 2023, the series has sold over 5.5 million units worldwide. The series sales and free-to-play downloads of Virtua Fighter 5 Ultimate Showdown combined totaled over 18 million units.

== Legacy ==
Virtua Fighter is often considered to be the grandfather of 3D fighting games, with each iteration being noted for advancing the graphical and technical aspects of games in the genre. Many 3D fighting game series such as Tekken and Dead or Alive were heavily influenced by Virtua Fighter, and the original Dead or Alive ran on the Model 2 hardware. In 1998, the series was recognized by the Smithsonian Institution for contributions in the field of Art and Entertainment, and became a part of the Smithsonian Institution's Permanent Research Collection on Information Technology Innovation. Its arcade cabinets are kept at the Smithsonian's National Museum of American History, where Virtua Fighter is the only video game on permanent display. In 1999, Next Generation listed the Virtua Fighter series as number 8 on their "Top 50 Games of All Time", commenting that, "Virtua Fighter is the most elegant fighting game ever created. With only two attack buttons, the game still offers an astonishingly wide range of martial art styles."

Virtua Fighter played a crucial role in popularizing 3D polygon graphics. The success of the Virtua Fighter series resulted in Guinness World Records awarding the series seven world records in Guinness World Records Gamer's Edition 2008, including "First Polygon Based Fighting Game", "First 3D Fighting Game", and "First Fighting Game for a 32-bit Console". 1UP listed Virtua Fighter as one of the 50 most important games of all time, crediting it for creating the 3D fighting game genre, and more generally, demonstrating the potential of 3D polygon human characters (as the first to implement them in a useful way), showing the potential of realistic gameplay (introducing a character physics system and realistic character animations for the time), and introducing fighting game concepts such as the ring-out and the block button. Virtua Fighter 2 on the Sega Model 2 introduced the use of texture-mapped 3D characters, and motion capture animation technology. Virtua Fighter 3 on the Sega Model 3 further advanced real-time graphics technology, with Computer and Video Games in 1996 comparing it to CGI and referring to it as "the most astounding display of video game graphic muscle ever in the history of this industry." In 1997, Next Generation stated that Virtua Fighter had supplanted Street Fighter as the premier fighting game series.

Some of the Sony Computer Entertainment (SCE) staff involved in the creation of the original PlayStation video game console credit Virtua Fighter as inspiration for the PlayStation's 3D graphics hardware. According to SCE's Shigeo Maruyama, the PlayStation was originally being considered as a 2D-focused hardware, and it was not until the release of Virtua Fighter that they decided to design the PlayStation as a 3D-focused hardware. Toby Gard also cited Virtua Fighter as an influence on the use of polygonal characters in Tomb Raider and the creation of Lara Croft. John Romero also cited Virtua Fighter as a major influence on the creation of 3D first-person shooter Quake. Team Ico's Fumito Ueda also cited Virtua Fighter as an influence on his animation work.

A late 1995 article in Next Generation declared that "The Virtua Fighter series has been, and will continue to be, the yardstick by which all next generation arcade and console fighting games will be measured for a long time coming." According to Eurogamer: "One of Yu Suzuki's most enduring creations once christened every round of new arcade hardware, was a pioneer in 3D graphics and helped establish online fighting. All the while, beneath those achievements emerged a game of exceptional depth and nuance." 1UP opined: "Due to its innovation, Virtua Fighter not only influenced competitors' games -- it basically created a genre. Technically, every 3D fighter that came after it owes Virtua Fighter for establishing that a 3D fighter could work. Even today, Tekken still takes inspiration from Sega's series." Game Informer's Andy McNamara wrote: "It has always been my opinion that the Virtua Fighter series is the most intense and balanced of all the 3D fighters on the market. Its control scheme is intuitive, its pacing perfect, and its depth unmatched." in 2006, IGN ranked Virtua Fighter as the 25th greatest game series of all time, explaining that "no other 3D fighter has equaled VF in terms of difficulty and depth."
