= Fighters Megamix =

1996 video game

- North American Saturn box art
- Developer: Sega AM2
- Publishers: Sega; Tiger Electronics (Game.com)
- Director: Hiroshi Kataoka
- Producer: Yu Suzuki
- Programmers: Tetsuya Sugimoto; Hideya Shibazaki
- Artist: Youji Kato
- Composers: Takenobu Mitsuyoshi; Hiroshi Kawaguchi
- Platforms: Sega Saturn, Game.com
- Release: Saturn: JP: December 21, 1996; NA: May 15, 1997; PAL: June 5, 1997; Game.com: NA: 1998
- Genre: Fighting
- Modes: Single-player, multiplayer

Fighters Megamix (Note: Japanese: ファイターズ メガミックス, Hepburn: Faitāzu Megamikkusu) is a 1996 fighting video game developed by Sega AM2, a crossover between Sega's 3D arcade games Virtua Fighter 2 and Fighting Vipers, with unlockable characters from several other AM2 games such as Virtua Cop 2 and Daytona USA. Developed for Sega Saturn, it had a global release in 1997; unlike most of AM2's games of the era, Fighters Megamix did not have an arcade release.

Intended as an introduction to Virtua Fighter 3 (which was announced but never released for the Saturn), Fighters Megamix utilized the concept originally used by The King of Fighters, whereby characters and styles from different games were mixed together. The open ended rings from Virtua Fighter are present (but with no ring-out), and also the closed cages from Fighting Vipers. Virtua Fighter characters have new moves taken from Virtua Fighter 3, including the dodge move, which allows characters to sidestep, avoiding a dangerous blow and opening at the same time room for a counter. It allows gamers to play as the bosses of both Virtua Fighter 2 and Fighting Vipers without cheat codes.

Upon release, it was hailed as one of the Saturn's best games, with critics deeming its crossover mechanics a complete success, and met with strong sales.

== Gameplay ==
Fighters Megamix includes a training mode, a survival mode, a two-player vs. mode, a team battle mode, and a one-player mode split into nine tracks:

- Novice Trial (beginners)
- Virtua Fighter (all characters from Virtua Fighter)
- Fighting Vipers (all characters from Fighting Vipers)
- Girls (female characters)
- Muscle (strong characters)
- Smart guys (tactical fighters)
- Dirty fighters (sneaky fighters)
- Bosses (hidden characters played last)
- Secrets (the rest of the bonus characters not fought in bosses)

Each track consists of six fights against currently available characters followed by a final battle against a hidden character. Once the first four tracks are completed, the next three become unlocked. After beating those, the next track (bosses) becomes unlocked, and then the final (bonus).

Players can switch between two fighting systems based on Virtua Fighter and Fighting Vipers, with the latter selected by default. The systems differ in their combat mechanics, including the distance characters are knocked back and their ability to recover from attacks. Battles can take place in either open arenas or walled arenas.

The default cast of characters consists of the entire cast from Virtua Fighter 2 and Fighting Vipers, as well as Kumachan, a bear mascot in a hat that has no points of articulation. The Virtua Fighter 2 characters have some (but not all) of their new moves from Virtua Fighter 3 added. The announcer is also the same as in Virtua Fighter 3. The Fighting Vipers characters still have their armor from that game, and the Virtua Fighter 2 characters accordingly have new moves for breaking armor.

In addition to its single-player courses, the game features a versus mode supporting matches against another player or a computer-controlled opponent, team battles involving up to eight characters on each side, and a survival mode with time limits of three, seven or fifteen minutes. A training mode allows players to practise individual character moves and combinations.

== Characters ==
From Virtua Fighter 2:

- Akira Yuki
- Pai Chan
- Lau Chan
- Wolf Hawkfield
- Jeffry McWild
- Kage Maru
- Sarah Bryant
- Jacky Bryant
- Shun Di
- Lion Rafale
- Dural

From Fighting Vipers:

- Grace
- Bahn
- Raxel
- Tokio
- Sanman
- Jane
- Candy (Note: Named Honey in the Japanese version, as in the original Fighting Vipers.)
- Picky
- Mahler
- B.M.
- Kumachan/Pandachan

There are twelve hidden characters from other AM2 games. They are unlocked by completing all of the single-player mode sections except for Novice Trial, which unlocks a separate costume for Candy. Each character either plays as a Fighting Vipers character (with armour that can be smashed off) or a Virtua Fighter character (without armour):

Bark the Polar Bear — one of AM2's creations for Sonic the Fighters. Bark is a cream bear with large tufts of hair sticking out from the front and back of his 'beanie' hat. He wears a scarf and mittens. His alternate costume is a Santa Claus-esque suit. He plays like a Virtua Fighter character and is unlocked by defeating the 'Muscle' section. He retains his home stage from Sonic the Fighters, albeit without the walls and with the background music from Sonic the Fighters's Flying Carpet stage instead.

Bean the Dynamite — the other of AM2's creations for Sonic the Fighters. Bean is a green duck who wears a neck-a-chief and Sonic the Hedgehog's shoes, without the socks. He is based on the Sega arcade game Dynamite Düx, hence his name 'The Dynamite'. In his alternate "costume" in this game, he becomes blue and looks exactly like the character Bin from that game. His trademark bombs are still present, though changed in appearance and some functions, but he still has his three main bomb-related moves (overhead bomb spread, bomb kick, and tossing a bomb onto a fallen foe and covering his ears). He plays like a Virtua Fighter character and is unlocked by defeating the 'Muscle' section (though he is not fought until the Bonus section). His home stage is not his own from Sonic the Fighters but actually Knuckles', the South Island stage.

Deku — The only original character created for the game, Deku is a comical Mexican green bean in a hat. When his hat is smashed off, a bird is under it, perched on his head. He plays like a Fighting Vipers character and is unlocked by defeating the 'Dirty Fighters' section. His home stage is the same generic arena seen in the training mode.

Janet — Janet is from Virtua Cop 2 and has a fondness for countering. Her moves are those of Aoi Umenokoji (from Virtua Fighter 3) and can be unlocked by defeating the 'Girls' section. Her arena, Virtua City, is based upon the first stage from the original Virtua Cop.

Kids Akira — Akira Yuki's super deformed form from Virtua Fighter Kids. He is unlocked by defeating the 'Virtua Fighter' section. The default is Fighting Vipers. He retains his home stage from Virtua Fighter Kids.

Kids Sarah — Sarah Bryant's super deformed form from Virtua Fighter Kids. She is unlocked by defeating the Virtua Fighter section (though she is not fought until the Bonus section). Her stage is actually Sarah's Virtua Fighter 1 stage, now with the addition of neon letters that act as walls, spelling "MEGAMIX."

Hornet — Hornet is a car (number 41) from Daytona USA, the car humorously stands on back wheels and boxes with its front. It plays like a Fighting Vipers character and can have its shell knocked off, revealing body, engine and other parts below. Its voice is sounds of an engine and many other sound effects from Daytona USA, such as screeching tires. Both of Hornet's costumes are a reference to its automatic (Red and Blue) or manual (Red and Yellow) transmissions. Its stage is based upon a racecourse from Daytona USA (the Beginner's course from the arcade game, "Three-Seven Speedway"). Once its armor is removed, it fights using Bahn's move set. It is unlocked by defeating the 'Secrets' section.

Rent-A-Hero — from the Japan only game Rent a Hero for the Sega Mega Drive. Rent-A-Hero plays like a Fighting Vipers character, but he has an additional handicap, battery life, measured by battery shaped red symbols above his health meter. If they all disappear, Rent-A-Hero shuts down. He is unlocked by defeating the 'Smart Guys' section. His stage is the "Chicago" stage from Virtua Fighter 2 (the stage the player gets if Jacky and Sarah face each other in a match). It is actually unlocked before Rent-A-Hero, with the original Virtua Fighter 2 music, but when Rent-A-Hero fights in the stage, the Rent-A-Hero theme music plays instead. Rent-A-Hero's stage music was changed in the North American and European release. In the Japanese version his stage music is a remake of the title screen music played in the Sega Mega Drive version of Rent-A-Hero, which is similar to that of a Japanese sentai show theme song, while the North American and European versions have an instrumental version of the song.

Siba — Siba is from a prototype of Virtua Fighter but was cut from the cast by the time of game's actual release, though an icon featuring him (and mislabeled as "Akira") appears on older Virtua Fighter arcade cabinets. Siba is an Arab in a white and purple outfit equipped with a sword that charges with green energy. He is unlocked by defeating the 'Bosses' section. His stage is based upon Wolf's "desert" stage from Virtua Fighter 3.

URA Bahn — a super-powered version of Bahn from Fighting Vipers. He is unlocked by defeating the 'Fighting Vipers' section. His stage is on the outskirts of Old Armstone town, with the buildings from regular Bahn's arena visible in the distance.

AM2 Palm Tree — the developer's emblem is available as a playable character by clocking up 84 hours of game time, then selecting the Kumachan character with the Z button.

Mr Meat (Niku) — this odd character becomes available after the game has been booted up 30 times. Mr Meat is selectable by placing the cursor on Kumachan and pressing X and opting to play "course I".

== Regional differences ==
The rendered images seen in the game credits after completing a section of the single-player mode are unlocked and can be viewed in a gallery in 'Extra Options'. However, two of these images were altered between the Japanese, PAL and American versions of the game.

At the end of the "girls" course, the second portrait to appear in Japanese releases was Honey (Candy in releases outside Japan) in just her bra and thong. In the US, this was replaced by a portrait of Candy fully clothed and sporting her original "player 2" colors (blond hair, blue dress) from Fighting Vipers. The image of Tokio with his shirt open from the "Smart Guys" course ending was changed. Both of these images are retained for the PAL release of the game.

== Differences from Fighting Vipers & Virtua Fighter 2 ==
- The Fighting Vipers characters' "player 2" colours in Fighters Megamix differ from the original Fighting Vipers game. For example, in Vipers player 2 Raxel had red hair and a purple guitar whereas in Megamix this was changed to purple hair and a blue guitar. With the exceptions of Kumachan (the "player 2" panda version can be selected with the C button as normal), Candy (who has a new unlockable outfit she wears instead), and Mahler (who has been given a new design in Megamix to differentiate him from B.M.), the original "player 2" colours for the Vipers can be chosen with the X button.
- Each Virtua Fighter 2 character has their respective stage from that game, except for Dural-instead she has her Virtua Fighter 1 stage. Her Virtua Fighter 2 underwater stage is still in the game but it belongs to the Fighting Vipers character Mahler instead.
- Pai and Kage don't lose their head accessories when they are knocked to the ground, unlike in Virtua Fighter 2.
- There is a small percentage of critical hit flashes and blood throughout Fighting Vipers matches.

== Development ==
Asked what the impetus for the game was, AM2 stated, "Towards the end of the year we always think about having a festive game for all the users who support the Sega Saturn." The Fighters Megamix project was kept secret, with the game not being announced until a November 6, 1996 press conference - less than two months before its initial release.

In an interview with Japanese magazine Saturn Fan, director Hiroshi Kataoka explained that Fighters Megamix was conceived as a new fighting game featuring characters from Virtua Fighter and Fighting Vipers, rather than simply combining the two existing games. He discussed the challenges of reconciling their different combat systems, particularly the armour and defensive mechanics, while preserving the characteristics of fighters from both series. In a separate interview with Sega Saturn Magazine, Kataoka described the project as the realisation of a dream for its developers.

AM2 described Fighters Megamix as a fairly easy game to create. Though getting all the moves from Virtua Fighter 2 to fit onto a single disc had required the team to spend months developing new compression techniques, later advances in compression technology made fitting Fighters Megamix's much larger selection of moves a relatively simple task.

As a promotional effort, DJs Commander Tom and DJ MARS created a dance club mix from the music in Fighters Megamix. The song, titled "Fighters", was released as a single on July 25, 1997.

In 1998 an adaptation for the Game.com was released by Tiger Electronics.

== Reception ==
Reception

Aggregate score
Aggregator	Score
GameRankings	88% (6 reviews)

Review scores
Publication	Score
Computer and Video Games	5/5
Electronic Gaming Monthly	8.125/10
Famitsu	35/40
Game Informer	9.25/10
GameFan	281/300
GameSpot	8.6/10
Next Generation	5/5
Digitiser	95%
Sega Pro	95%
Sega Saturn Magazine	95%

Fighters Megamix met with critical acclaim upon release. The game was awarded a 9.25/10 from Game Informer, the highest score any Saturn game received from the magazine. They praised the game's roster and variety of move sets. Sega Saturn Magazine's Rich Leadbetter stated that the game was "different enough to VF2 and indeed VF3 to warrant immediate purchase. The fact that it has huge depth and gargantuan levels of playability helps too." Jeff Gerstmann's GameSpot review stated that "if you don't own a Saturn and have even a passing interest in the VF series, this is probably the game you could use to justify purchasing the system." GamePro gave it a 4.5 out of 5 for graphics and a perfect 5.0 in every other category (sound, fun factor, and control), remarking that "Matching up brawlers from Fighting Vipers and Virtua Fighter 2 is inspired thinking, and though Megamix isn't perfect, it's close to it." Next Generation summarized, "Simply put, this is the best fighting game ever on a system that's already chock full of great fighting games." Famitsu scored it 35 out of 40.

Despite their positive overall assessments, most reviewers voiced a few criticisms of the game. Gerstmann and Next Generation both noted that the graphics, while good, use fewer polygons and a lower resolution than the Saturn version of Virtua Fighter 2. A number of critics also found the enemy AI too easy, though Leadbetter remarked that the difficulty was dramatically increased in the PAL version. Critics generally concluded that these issues were eclipsed by the vast and well-designed selection of characters and the interesting gameplay dynamics which result when Virtua Fighter characters are pitted against Fighting Vipers characters.

Digitiser ranked it the third best of 1997, below Super Mario 64 and Final Fantasy VII. In 2017, GamesRadar included it in their list of the best Sega Saturn games, claiming that "Sega AM2’s bash-up mashup offers a staggering array of content for dedicated players to get to grips with."

=== Commercial ===
The game became one of the best-selling Sega Saturn games, with over 600,000 copies sold in Japan alone. In the United States, it was the top Saturn video game rental for three months 1997, from June to August. In the September 1997 issue of Computer and Video Games, Fighters Megamix ranked sixth on the magazine's American multi-format sales chart.

The game also continued to chart several months after its European release, placing second on the Saturn sales chart in September 1997, behind The King of Fighters '95 and ahead of Manx TT Super Bike. In Spain, Fighters Megamix topped the Sega Saturn chart published by Hobby Consolas in June and July 1997, before ranking second in October and fourth in November. In Australia, Fighters Megamix topped the Sega Saturn sales chart published by Hyper magazine for three consecutive issues between September and November 1997. The charts were supplied by Australian video game retailer Hitech World. In July 1997, Fighters Megamix ranked fourth on an all-formats Swedish retail sales chart published by Super Play, compiled by Design Promotions from reports supplied by video game retailers.

== Legacy ==
Fighters Megamix has retrospectively been regarded as an early precursor to later crossover fighting games. In 2024, MeriStation described it as a spiritual precursor to the Super Smash Bros. series, noting that three years before the release of the first Super Smash Bros., Sega had already brought together characters from several otherwise unrelated franchises, including unconventional playable characters such as the Hornet car from Daytona USA. Retro Gamer similarly described the game as a "crossover classic" and one of the notable 3D fighting games of its generation.
