= Pai Chan =

- Virtua Fighter character
- Pai Chan in Virtua Fighter 5
- First game: Virtua Fighter
- Created by: Yu Suzuki
- Voiced by: English: Evelyn Huynh (Virtua Quest); Amy Tipton (anime); Japanese: Junko Iwao (Virtua Fighter 2); Naoko Matsui (anime); Minami Takayama (onwards from Virtua Fighter 3); Yuri Tsunematsu (Goonya Fighter)

Pai Chan (Japanese: パイ・チェン, Hepburn: Pai Chen) is a fictional character in the Sega fighting game series Virtua Fighter, debuting in the first installment from 1993. She is the daughter of Lau Chan and a martial arts action movie star in her hometown, fighting using Mizongyi. She seeks to defeat her father and prove herself a worthy successor to his school of martial arts. She was initially hostile towards her father for neglecting her until Virtua Fighter 4, where she reconciled with him after finding out he had been diagnosed with an incurable disease. Although Pai Chan is from Hong Kong and her native language is Cantonese, due to the game's Japanese origin, she is voiced by an actress speaking Japanese, Junko Iwao, in Virtua Fighter 2, and Minami Takayama from Virtua Fighter 3 onwards. Besides the main series, Pai Chan has appeared in multiple spin-offs as well as the anime adaptation of the series, where she follows protagonist Akira Yuki and other fighters on a journey after being attacked by criminals.

Critical response to Pai Chan's character has been generally positive, with several writers noting her to be one of the earliest examples of a female character in a fighting game with a distinct sex appeal, often compared with Sarah Bryant due to their different nationalities. Her bad relationship with her father, Lau Chan, was also notable for showing a distinct negative characterization mixed with tragedy.

== Conception and design ==
While several Virtua Fighter characters were inspired by manga and anime, Pai Chan was inspired by a model game designer Yu Suzuki saw in a commercial. Suzuki said "kung fu" is one of his favorite words and thus made Pai Chan's victory quote, "Your kung fu isn't strong enough", her catchphrase. Initially, Pai Chan was going to be featured with a skimpy outfit, but the final product gave her an outfit that covered more of her appearance. Suzuki expressed hardships in designing Pai Chan as a result of how demanding it was to portray her beauty in her 3D model.

Her look, including her various uniforms and appearance, was designed to be appealing, with the team experimenting with different outfits, like a sailor uniform, before settling on her signature styles. Pai Chan's design originally had a sailor uniform in location tests, eventually changing to something fitting for Winter. Several of her uniforms involved a skirt that the designers felt was unfitting. Rather than Aikido, the outfit exudes an air of ultimate self-centeredness. Several versions of the uniform were designed. The staff aimed to make her skin appealing. "Not only the costume, but the hat looks good too. The Indian-style costume also suits him. A version with a shirt underneath, giving her a youth aura. The outfits made were also drawn to reinforce her Chinese nationality as well as her acting work. It reminded me of the villains in old kung fu movies."

== Appearances ==
=== Main Virtua Fighter games ===
Debuting in the 1993 Virtua Fighter fighting game, Pai is a leading star in Hong Kong action films. Lau's only daughter, Pai, was specially trained by her father in martial arts from a young age. However, while Lau obsessively strove on with his training, Pai's mother worked so hard to support the family that she died of overwork. Her death devastated Pai Chan, and she blamed it on Lau; she swore that one day she would beat him. When she received word that her father was going to enter the World Fighting Tournament, she also decided to enter. It revealed that she was rather weak, and she decided to train for a year before the Second World Fighting Tournament in Virtua Fighter 2.

During the past year, she incorporated her own techniques and tactics she had discovered. She is determined to defeat her father again but is defeated. Pai began working on her new world-spanning, big-budget film until she heard that there would be a third tournament in Virtua Fighter 3. After being defeated in Virtua Fighter 3 and discovering that her skills matched those of her father's, Pai went back to Hong Kong to concentrate on her acting career. One day, she hears of Lau's intention to find a suitable successor in Virtua Fighter 4. Finding it strange, she investigates the matter and discovers Lau's terminal illness. She too decides to join the fourth world tournament to prove that she is a worthy successor to her father's legacy.

=== Spin-offs and other media ===
Pai Chan wishes to challenge someone stronger than ever as a test. She taught herself to be more powerful, like a fighting style in this tournament. Pai meets Janet Marshall in Virtua Cop 2 as a friend and a challenger; she may be a student of Janet Marshall, as she trains her for an upcoming training skill. In Virtua Fighter Kids, Pai is depicted as a young girl. In this variant of Virtua Fighter 2, she is seen as a martial arts child actress, working on a movie with super deformed depictions of the Virtua Cop characters as her fans. Pai Chan was a friend of Janet Marshall. She and Janet challenged each other so that they both could be stronger than ever. She dislikes others getting involved in this fight. She additionally appears in the game Fighters Megamix, a crossover title with Sega AM2's Fighting Vipers franchise, where she has a rivalry with the character Honey. Despite having voiced lines in each game, no voice actor has been credited for the character.

It is revealed in the Virtua Fighter anime that Pai was taught Ensei-ken forcibly rather than by her own volition, and that Jacky accuses Pai early on of being part of the Koenkan mafia group. Her mother, though not shown in the games, was shown in the anime. Lau did not train in Koen-ken to cope with his wife's passing, but rather, he was absorbed in it. He became so absorbed that he did not even notice that his wife was dying. Also, it is revealed that Pai's mother did not die when she was 16, but she instead died when Pai was really young, maybe around 6 to 10 years of age.

She is also present in Project X Zone, Project X Zone 2, Dengeki Bunko: Fighting Climax, and The King of Fighters All Star.

== Critical reception ==
In analyzing the character, the book Sheroes: Genderspiele im virtuellen Raum says Pai Chan stands out for her fast movements, multiple flips, and hand-to-hand fighting with both weapons and naked hands. Besides regular karate, she can twist an opponent's arm and throw them over her shoulder to the ground, letting out a loud karate shout. In her final triumphant gestures, she throws her arms up, rises onto one toe, bends the other, and utters an Asian phrase. This blend of ballet and karate is emphasized by her clothing, as she wears a floral-patterned combat uniform, a silk sash, and white ballet flats. In the book Beautiful Fighting Girl, Pai Chan was noted to be one of the earliest expansions of female characters in martial arts, which became popular thanks to Chun-Li, with Pai Chan and Sarah Bryant being close examples created a year later after her. An issue of Official Sega Saturn Magazine UK said that Pai Chan was often overshadowed by Sarah when it came to the male gaze from players. Nevertheless, the writer from the magazine claimed the staff enjoyed her sex appeal, which they found good for promoting the magazine. In "The rules of beauty in video games", Game Criticism said Pai was not popular among gamers until the second installment of Virtua Fighter, thanks to the creation of a video Sega made devoted to her. In contrast to other young characters in gaming, Pai Chan was more popular for being more ladylike and expanding more on her beauty than in her portrayal from the games, especially thanks to a shower scene.

The staff of the Chinese magazine Diànzǐ Yóuxì Ruǎnjiàn, in their supplemental 1997 issue, stated that while she was not as popular as Sarah, attributing it in part to Pai's similarity to Capcom character Chun-Li, they felt she had a completely different charm to her. Describing her as having a very stubborn personality due to how repetitive her reasons for participating in the tournaments were, they saw her as becoming more fleshed out as the series went on and that her role as an actress helped illustrate an easy-going aspect to her personality. In Japanese Culture Through Videogames, Pai Chan's Chinese design is noted for contrasting Sarah's Western look, which was one of the earliest portrayals in fighting game history.

In Gamest magazine's Gals Island series, Aoi Otosuke described her ability to go from a fierce combatant to a child-like state as part of her charm that made her so appealing. Further praise went to Pai's "elegant, sharp, and fluid " fighting style, with Otosuke stating she captivated audiences and as the series progressed represented the increased technical skill of the Virtua Fighter development team. They observed that while her fighting style was displayed as second to none, she was also portrayed as being a lightweight when it came to receiving attacks, attributing this to portrayals of women in fighting games. Otosuke also observed Pai's odd relationship with her father, describing it as a very confusing feud but grounded in reality due to his notoriety.

GameSina said she is basically a female version of Mortal Kombat character Johnny Cage due to their acting careers but felt Pai's story was expanded more, thanks to her early issues with her father. The writer said that her biography gives a notable hint about her dark depths, as during the Virtua Fighter narrative, a young Pai tries to kill her father until learning of his terminal illness. Pai's hatred of her father being related to her mother's death was notable, as that ignited her full dedication to martial arts. Nevertheless, she fails in each installment and changes her viewpoint upon learning the truth. At that time, she only wanted to prove to her father that she could inherit his legacy and become an invincible martial artist rather than kill him.

In another analysis of the character, GameSina said Lau and Pai might be father and daughter in the story, but there is almost no father-daughter relationship between them. The father is obsessed with pursuing perfect and invincible martial arts, leaving the family solely to Pai Chan's mother's hard work because of her death. This became a notable feud between father and daughter in gaming. While both use a similar martial art, Pai is designed to use standard Yanqing Fist, while Lau uses the highest level of Yanqing Fist, Tiger Swallow Fist. Yanqing Fist emphasizes agility and stability, focusing on combat techniques rather than flashy moves, and is known for its proper stance and powerful, flowing energy. By the fifth installment, Lau had become the weakest fighter due to becoming an elder, while his daughter remained in her prime.

In a discussion with Takashi Kurokochi, orthopedic surgeon and director of the Yurakucho Cosmetic Surgery Clinic, the Japanese magazine Game Hihyou asked him to comment on female characters in fighting games and what made their designs particularly beautiful in the eyes of Japanese audiences, among them Pai. Kurokochi pointed out her forehead, stating that while he felt it was too high, it was actually a very popular sight in Korea, where an uneven forehead by comparison is considered unlucky. Going further, he also pointed out she had narrow eyes and a raised nose tip, something he also felt helped fit Korean beauty standards.
