= Virtua Quest =

2004 video game

- North American PS2 box art
- Developer(s): AM2, TOSE
- Publisher(s): Sega
- Series: Virtua Fighter
- Platform(s): GameCube, PlayStation 2
- Release: JP: August 26, 2004; NA: January 18, 2005
- Genre(s): Fighting, action-adventure
- Mode(s): Single-player

Virtua Quest (Note: known in Japan as Virtua Fighter Cyber Generation: Ambition of the Judgement Six (バーチャファイター サイバージェネレーション 〜ジャッジメントシックスの野望〜, Bācha Faitā Saibā Jenerēshon: Jajjimento Shikkusu no Yabō)) is a Virtua Fighter spin-off title co-developed by TOSE and Sega AM2, and published by Sega for the GameCube and PlayStation 2.

== Plot ==
In this world, many people avoid reality, and instead spend their free time in the Nexus virtual universe. Sei is recruited by his friend, Hayami, into becoming a hunter, one who sells data chips found in the Nexus.

Sei meets his new navigator, a creature named Bit. Then a girl approaches him and directs him to log out, which Sei is unable to do. The girl then tells him to go to a warehouse and find what he needs there, and tells him that he's "in this fight, no matter what. The only person that can defend you is yourself." before disappearing.

At the warehouse, Sei meets a man that bears a vague resemblance to his father, and tells him that he may need to fight, questioning whether he considers to fight for himself or for others. Sei is baffled, and as to rid his anxiety, the man teaches him Synapse Break, a special technique. Once taught this, Sei is confident, and starts his hunter journey.

Eventually, Sei finds out more about Toka, who formerly worked for the Judgement Six group. One of Judgement Six's leaders, Moon, is collecting Data from fighters in order to conquer the world. Sei meets another hunter who can use Synapse Break, named Schatt. Schatt is investigating something and is looking for some "Backup Data". Later, Schatt explains more to Sei, that he investigated a group by the name of Judgement Six and he had a partner by the name of Raud who was killed by Judgement Six. Schatt told Sei to leave and decided to fight Moon and his group alone.

Later in the game Sei became discouraged and came across Hayami again with the girl by the name of Fei and finds out that her brother Fan has been logging in to other servers just to find out he could log out. Later Sei is told in order to get into the server, he had to increase his Hunter ranking.

Soon, Sei rescues Fan's brother Fei just as he is informed by Hayami that more kidnappers have been seen on Dong Qian Jie server. As Sei goes there he spots strong enemies and a specially made Bit. The special Bit kidnapped Bit. As Sei chased him down and rescue Bit and goes down the server stage a little further, Sei came across Toka only to find out she was interrogated by Moon the leader of Judgement Six. Sei tried to stop Moon but was stopped by a special made Schatt. Moon escaped with Toka. Schatt also escaped only to find out Sei is once again surrounded by more enemies. Soon, Sei comes across Schatt once again and notices Schatt can also use Virtua Souls (the one he uses is Lau Chan's). The two had a showdown. He defeated Schatt only to found out the real Schatt was possessed by Moon earlier in the game which he'd lost to Moon. Schatt forcibly logged off (which is supposed to be a Virtua was of death in the Virtua Quest game) just to found out after Sei logged off. He was informed once again that Judgement Six is full-on invading multiple servers leading to the final battle. Sei uses Virtua Soul and fought Lau Chan from the Virtua Soul he gained from Schatt earlier during the fight with Schatt.

== Reception ==
Reception

Aggregate scores
Aggregator	Score
GameRankings	52.88% (GC); 52.04% (PS2)
Metacritic	55/100 (GC); 53/100 (PS2)

Review scores
Publication	Score
1Up.com	40%
GameSpot	5.7/10
IGN	6.6/10
Play	62%

Virtua Quest received mixed reviews upon release. IGN said: "The action is mediocre at best, and the platform elements feel sloppy and unrefined. The graphics and sound are equally forgetful." Play said it had "stiff controls, an antiquated camera with no look button". GameSpot said: "The action is plagued by loose controls and a bad camera, your scores of brain-dead opponents never put up enough of a fight to make things satisfying, and it's all set in a blandly designed world." 1Up said: "The derivative nature of the plot goes hand-in-hand with the completely unimaginative gameplay. Nothing here is original."
