= Virtua Fighter Kids =

1996 video game

- North American Saturn cover art
- Developer: Sega AM2
- Publisher: Sega
- Director: Makoto Osaki
- Producer: Yu Suzuki
- Programmer: Takayuki Yamaguchi
- Artist: Masataka Aochi
- Composer: Kazuhiko Kouchi
- Series: Virtua Fighter
- Platforms: Arcade, Sega Saturn
- Release: Arcade: WW: March 1996; Saturn: JP: July 26, 1996; NA: September 3, 1996; EU: September 26, 1996
- Genre: Fighting
- Modes: Single player, multiplayer
- Arcade system: ST-V

Virtua Fighter Kids (Note: Japanese: バーチャファイター キッズ Bācha Faitā Kizzu) is a 1996 installment in the Virtua Fighter fighting video game series, and a super deformed version of Virtua Fighter 2. It was developed by Sega AM2 on the ST-V arcade board, unlike Virtua Fighter 2's hardware; it was also ported to the Sega Saturn.

== Gameplay ==
Gameplay screenshot

All the characters have big heads, and the music is at a faster pace. The gameplay itself is slightly tweaked from Virtua Fighter 2. The Saturn version includes some new FMVs and programmable button sequences to allow players to test and use pre-made combos. Despite being children, some of the fighters retain the adult characteristics of their Virtua Fighter 2 counterparts, such as facial hair, muscles and breasts.

== Release ==
Merchandise for the game in Japan included a line of stuffed toys which sold very well even before development on the game was finished.

In Japan, Virtua Fighter Kids was released on the Saturn as a promotional item in co-operation with drink brands "Java Tea" and "Energen" under the title Virtua Fighter Kids: Java Tea Original Edition. It was later released commercially without any mention of "Java Tea" on the cover. All Java Tea product placement was removed from the western versions of the game, but is present in all Japanese versions (arcade, regular and Java Edition).

== Appearances in other games ==
Although no official sequels to Virtua Fighter Kids were ever made (other than the VF Kids versions of the CG Portrait Series in Japan called the Game Gear Portrait Series), the child versions of Akira Yuki and Sarah Bryant reappear as playable characters in Fighters Megamix, and some of their fellow playable characters appear in the game's ending movie as well. The Kid styles of Akira Yuki and Sarah Bryant were made into figures in the Sega Dreamcast game Shenmue.

== Reception ==
Sega Saturn Reception

Aggregate score
Aggregator	Score
GameRankings	73% (6 reviews)

Review scores
Publication	Score
AllGame	4/5
Electronic Gaming Monthly	7/10, 7/10, 6/10, 5/10
Famitsu	7/10, 8/10, 8/10, 8/10
GameSpot	6.6/10
Next Generation	4/5
Sega Saturn Magazine (UK)	91%
MAN!AC	88/100

In Japan, Game Machine listed Virtua Fighter Kids as the third most successful arcade game of April 1996.

Virtua Fighter Kids divided reviewers to an extent. GameSpot, Scary Larry of GamePro and Dan Hsu, Crispin Boyer and Sushi-X of Electronic Gaming Monthly said that, while Virtua Fighter Kids would have made an amusing bonus mode in Virtua Fighter 2, it was not worthwhile as a full-price standalone release. On the other side, Next Generation, Rich Leadbetter of Sega Saturn Magazine and Shawn Smith of Electronic Gaming Monthly argued that features such as the funny cinemas, the new facial expressions on the characters and the new kid-themed scenery make the game more than a money-making gimmick, though they also said that it is not as good as the original version of Virtua Fighter 2. Most reviewers criticized the short reach of the kid characters. In a retrospect review, Colin of Allgame found the game the same as its predecessors, with faster gameplay and easier for younger players. He concluded that "While Virtua Fighter Kids doesn't necessarily offer anything spectacular, it's definitely a must-buy for the Virtua Fighter fan who needs everything or anyone who is interested in those big-headed Japanese cartoon characters." In 1998, Saturn Power ranked the game 86th on their list of the "Top 100 Sega Saturn Games", summarizing: "VF Kids is a pointless addition to the fold and offers very little new of any interest".
