= Ehrgeiz =

1998 video game

- PAL region cover art
- Developer: DreamFactory
- Publishers: Arcade; Namco; PlayStation; JP: Sony Computer Entertainment; NA: Square Electronic Arts; EU: Square
- Director: Seiichi Ishii
- Producer: Hirohide Sugiura
- Designer: Seiichi Ishii
- Artist: Tetsuya Nomura
- Composers: Takayuki Nakamura; Motoko Hieda
- Platforms: Arcade; PlayStation
- Release: Arcade; JP: March 1998; NA: March 1998; PlayStation; JP: December 17, 1998; NA: May 4, 1999; PAL: February 8, 2000
- Genre: Fighting
- Modes: Single-player, multiplayer
- Arcade system: Namco System 12

Ehrgeiz (エアガイツ, Eagaitsu; German: [ˈeːɐ̯ɡaɪ̯ts] "Ambition"), fully titled Ehrgeiz: God Bless the Ring, is a 1998 fighting game developed by DreamFactory and published by Namco for arcades. It was developed as a partnership between Square and DreamFactory. It was ported to the PlayStation, where Square released it internationally while Sony Computer Entertainment published it in Japan, a direct inversion of the companies' usual publishing deal.

The game includes characters from Final Fantasy VII: Cloud Strife, Tifa Lockhart – which are playable in both versions; Sephiroth, Yuffie Kisaragi, Vincent Valentine, and Zack Fair – which were added to the PlayStation's roster exclusively.

== Gameplay ==
=== Battle system ===
Ehrgeiz differs from most 3D fighting games by drawing heavily from the concepts of wrestling games and DreamFactory's own Tobal series, which allows for full 360-degree movement and does not require fighters to be facing one another at all times. This restricts the camera to a more or less fixed position, zooming in and out with the action, but not tracking around the arena as would be common in most other 2D and 3D fighting games. Characters can move freely in a 3-dimensional stage which is filled with many interactive objects and changes in elevation, allowing characters to leap on top of crates or use them as weapons, for example. There are four action buttons: guard, high attack, low attack, and special, which is a weapons-based attack that is different for each character.

=== Quest Mode ===
The PlayStation version includes a Quest Mode, similar to Tobal No. 1 and Tobal 2, titled Brand New Quest: The Forsaken Dungeon. Players fight through an extensive dungeon crawl, much like the Blizzard title Diablo, and can equip different weapons and items. There are also several smaller minigames, such as a race mode, where players run laps around a course while engaging in combat to slow down their opponent, and a board game similar to Reversi.

Quest Mode is a hack and slash action RPG mode of gameplay in Ehrgeiz. It begins in a dungeon in a parallel universe, and later moves to a nearby inn. The player can explore the town and enter the dungeon, which contains randomly generated maps. Somewhere on each floor of the dungeon will be a stairway to the next level downward in the dungeon. Since the main characters are archaeologists, the goal revolves around going as deep in the dungeon as possible in the hopes of finding great artifacts. Two characters are available for this mode: Clair Andrews and Koji Masuda. The player can switch between the two by visiting the inn. If one character dies in the dungeon, the other can "resurrect" him/her by finding the corpse.

The character development system revolves mainly around a five-point chart representing which statistics will be increased in the character upon raising his/her level. Consuming Protein, Vitamins, Minerals, Carbohydrates, or Lipids will in turn increase Attack, Magic, Dexterity, Speed, or Defense, respectively. The diagram points and stretches towards each of these points. As one point is focused on, the diagram will contract on the other points of the diagram. Thus, increasing how much one stat will raise will lower how much the other stats will raise.

A major facet of the Quest Mode is hunger management. Each monster can drop a food item which will fill the hunger bar slightly, and supply the player with one of the previously mentioned nutrients. Eating while the hunger bar is full will increase the maximum size of their stomach (though the actual size of the bar on the screen remains the same, the number of units represented is greater). This effect also applies when drinking health potions while the HP meter is full.

There are several recipe books hidden throughout the Quest portion of the game's dungeon. Wine trading is available after getting the second recipe book and talking to a man in a restaurant in the town. The player can buy and trade wine here much like a stock market, where the value of the wine will go up and down periodically. Players can then trade back the wine either to earn or lose profit.

== Plot ==
The sword Ehrgeiz, legendarily powerful, was sealed away and could only be opened with the Ehrgeiz stone. This stone was made a prize for a fighting tournament, and whoever won, would take the sword.

=== Characters ===
- Ken "Godhand" Mishima – Once a mercenary for Red Scorpion, Godhand decided to leave the organization and take with him the knowledge of the ancient ruin. Resigning from the organization meant cutting off one's right hand. As painful as it was, Ken did the deed and then betrayed Red Scorpion by selling the information to a large wealthy syndicate group. Together, they formed an excavation company to seize control of the ancient ruin in the Middle East. As part of his deal, he was given a new prosthetic right arm, plus was told the theory that the Ehrgeiz stone was the key to the door. He now believes he must become the champion and bear the sword. He bears a strong resemblance to Namco's Tekken character Jin Kazama. Vincent Valentine (FFVII) uses Godhand's moveset. His moveset contains moves from Kazuya Mishima, Jin Kazama, Heihachi Mishima, Baek Doo San, and Paul Phoenix from the Tekken series. His costume also bears resemblance to that of Bryan Fury's costumes in addition to Godhand's right hand being cybernetic.
- Han Daehan – A master of taekwondo and a young action star without the need for a stuntman, Han is a popular lad amongst the public. What the public does not know is that his right leg is actually artificial. During a movie shoot a year ago in the Middle East, a mysterious cloud of black smoke engulfed Han's leg. Peculiarly, although his leg has disappeared, he continues to retain a sensation of its existence. As he continues to seek an explanation for this particular phenomenon, he stumbles upon information that similar incidents have occurred every few decades in the area containing the ancient ruins. Han is another who becomes drawn to the mysterious surroundings of the ancient ruins. He bears a strong resemblance to Tekken's Hwoarang.
- Prince Doza – His motto is, "I’ll destroy anyone who stands in my path!" Each day, Doza seeks a more powerful opponent. However, in the world of kickboxing, he is already without equal. Able to defeat his opponents with his bare fists, Doza has become bored and is in need of a challenge. In the midst of his unrest, he receives word of the Ehrgeiz tournament, where weapons, psychic powers, and projectile weapons are permitted. Thrilled, he is determined to test his skills. Although he has no interest in the secret that Ehrgeiz holds, his fighting spirit is fueled by the appearance of opponents that are more powerful than he has ever imagined. In order to not be outmatched by distance weapons, Doza enters the fray with a glove weapon that shoots fireballs, not unlike the Hadouken of Street Fighter fame. In the Japanese version, he is named Naseem. He bears a strong resemblance to Tekken's Bruce Irvin and Street Fighter's Adon. He seems to also be inspired by the boxer Naseem Hamed.
- "Yoyo" Yoko Kishibojin – Yoko's father is an explorer who teaches archaeology, and her mother is an expert in Kishiboujin Ryu jujutsu. At age 10, her parents divorced, leaving her to be raised solely by her mother. Although still in high school, her talents in jujutsu have been acknowledged by the ICPO which enables her to participate in their hand-to-hand combat research team. One day, she received a letter from her estranged father, entrusting her to carry out the duties necessary to acquire Ehrgeiz. In addition to this, she has been ordered by the ICPO to enter the tournament to investigate suspicious activities surrounding Ehrgeiz.
- Lee Shuwen – Known as the master of lethal kenpō, Lee holds the power and technique that can kill a man in a single strike. It has been said that Lee, founder of the Hakkyoku Ken, was killed some time ago through lethal poisoning. However, through the power of a legendary elixir found in the tomb of the first emperor, Lee has miraculously been brought back to life. Not only has this elixir brought him back to life, but it is also making him younger as time proceeds. At this rate, he will ultimately become younger and eventually return to the void. In an attempt to avoid such a fate, he embarks on a mission to acquire the true key to immortality. Thus, he begins his journey to uncover the mystery behind the legendary ancient ruins. He bears resemblance to Tekken's Lei Wulong. He is also based upon the real martial artist of the same name, Li Shuwen.
- Sasuke – Although it is evident by his appearance that he is a ninja, Sasuke's true identity remains unknown. Presently, he works as an agent for Red Scorpion, but since he has a mild case of amnesia, he cannot remember his true name. However, during a mission in which he was to assassinate the adventurer, Koji Masuda, he notices a mysterious stone embedded within a broken sword held by Masuda. Believing that this precious stone will enable him to recover his long-lost memories, Sasuke aims to acquire the legendary weapon, Ehrgeiz. Yuffie Kisaragi (FFVII) uses Sasuke's moveset. He resembles Ryu Hayabusa from Ninja Gaiden and Dead or Alive.
- Dasher Inoba – Inoba is a prominent wrestler and a disciple of Karl Schneider, the founder of the Ehrgeiz Tournament. He is also a member of the Ehrgeiz supervising committee. With the recent death of his master, Inoba discovers a note left behind by the late Schneider which suggests that he had been investigating the connection between the stone embedded within the Ehrgeiz and the ancient ruins. Ever since laying eyes upon the mystical stone, Inoba has been fascinated by its presence. Compounded by his urge to obtain the stone and uncover the mystery behind his master's investigation, he is determined to get his hands on the legendary weapon. As evidenced by the character's name, appearance, fighting style, vocal grunts, and committee status, Inoba is heavily inspired by the Japanese professional wrestler, Antonio Inoki.
- "Wolf Girl" Jo – As an infant, Jo survived an airplane crash in the Amazon while sustaining only minor injuries to her head. Raised by wolves, she gained physical strength that exceeds and surpasses normal human capabilities by as much as three times. Following the death of her "wolf" mother, Jo became known as the "Man-eating wolf girl", and was eventually captured and imprisoned. There, she exhibited uncontrollable hostility towards her supervising officers. Having heard about this girl through various rumors, Red Scorpion scouts her and gives her the name, Jo. She is given direct orders by Red Scorpion to seek the Ehrgeiz without knowing or understanding the reason why. She uses the dance-like Brazilian fighting style capoeira.
- Koji Masuda – Father of Yoko Kishibojin and third-time consecutive reigning champion of the Ehrgeiz Championship Tournament. He is also an archaeologist seeking to uncover the truth behind the mysteries surrounding the ancient ruin.
- Clair Andrews – A child prodigy who entered the university at the age of sixteen, Clair is one of Koji Masuda's archaeology students. Although she is relatively independent, she is still considered naïve. When Koji begins his journey, Clair impulsively joins him as his assistant. Her fighting style is Jeet Kune Do, and thus, shares many moves with Tekken's Marshall Law, although one of her special moves resembles Fei Long's Dragon Flame Kick from Street Fighter.
- Django/Red Scorpion – Django is a wolf-like character that plays the role of the sub-final boss. He can be unlocked as a playable character by meeting certain conditions in the game. His first costume features gray fur; however, his red-furred alternate costume resembles Final Fantasy VII's Red XIII. His attack names reference Red XIII, Red's father Seto, and Final Fantasy summons. Red Scorpion is Django's second form, which serves as the final boss.

=== Final Fantasy VII characters ===
- Cloud Strife (available at start in the PlayStation version)
- Tifa Lockhart (available at start in the PlayStation version)
- Sephiroth (available at start in the PlayStation version)
- Vincent Valentine (hidden character; must be unlocked; PlayStation version only)
- Yuffie Kisaragi (hidden character; must be unlocked; PlayStation version only)
- Zack Fair (hidden character; must be unlocked; PlayStation version only)

In the arcade version, Cloud, Tifa, and Sephiroth were revealed after thirty, sixty, and ninety days, respectively, after the initial install and boot of the game.

== Development ==
Ehrgeiz was developed by DreamFactory, who previously developed the Tobal fighting games for Square. The game was directed and designed by Virtua Fighter and Tekken designer Seiichi Ishii. The game's characters, both the original ones and those from Final Fantasy VII, were designed by Tetsuya Nomura. Ehrgeiz was announced as the first project to result from a licensing agreement allowing Square to develop games for Namco's Namco System 12 arcade board, and was exhibited at Namco's booth at the February 1998 AOU Show.

=== Music ===
Ehrgeiz Original Soundtrack contains sixty-one musical tracks from the game. It was composed by Takayuki Nakamura, who previously composed the DreamFactory and Square collaboration Tobal 2. It was released on November 21, 1998, by DigiCube.

Ehrgeiz Original Soundtrack track list
Disc One (original) (66:38): 1. "The Title" – 0:14; 2. "The Tale of 'Ehrgeiz'." – 0:46; 3. "Victory" – 1:13; 4. "Escape" – 1:45; 5. "Run Away in the Airship!" – 3:08; 6. "Hong Kong Reggae" – 1:36; 7. "Continental Train" – 1:19; 8. "The End of the Journey" – 1:31; 9. "Door of Truth" – 1:39; 10. "Fate" – 1:42; 11. "Those Who Fight (from Final Fantasy VII)" – 1:31; 12. "Prelude (from Final Fantasy VII)" – 1:45; 13. "A Song for the Man of the Future" – 1:35; 14. "The Legend." – 1:10; 15. "Der Ehrgeiz." – 1:27; 16. "A self-service Selector." – 0:43; 17. "Elevator" – 1:28; 18. "Fresh Fish" – 2:02; 19. "Continue" – 0:38; 20. "Stage Clear" – 0:09; 21. "Map Song 1" – 0:17; 22. "Map Song 2" – 0:25; 23. "Map Song 3" – 0:17; 24. "Map Song 4" – 0:17; 25. "Opening (Short Version)" – 1:34; 26. "Brand New Quest" – 2:48; 27. "Ruined Town" – 2:39; 28. "Dungeon 1" – 1:38; 29. "Dungeon 2" – 2:35; 30. "Dungeon 3" – 1:47; 31. "Dungeon 4" – 2:32; 32. "Dungeon 5" – 1:30; 33. "Dungeon 6" – 4:15; 34. "Dungeon 7" – 2:36; 35. "Battle in a Trap" – 1:26; 36. "Boss" – 1:21; 37. "Master Boss" – 1:33; 38. "Phoenix" – 3:01; 39. "Store 1" – 1:32; 40. "Store 2" – 1:44; 41. "Hotel" – 2:12; 42. "Magic Store" – 1:31	Disc Two (arranged) (64:34): 1. "The Tale of 'Ehrgeiz'." – 1:28; 2. "Victory" – 3:31; 3. "Escape" – 4:26; 4. "Run Away in the Airship!" – 3:54; 5. "Hong Kong Reggae" – 3:34; 6. "Continental Train" – 3:25; 7. "The End of the Journey" – 3:38; 8. "Door of Truth" – 4:34; 9. "Fate" – 4:06; 10. "Those Who Fight (from Final Fantasy VII)" – 4:24; 11. "Prelude (from Final Fantasy VII)" – 3:23; 12. "A Song for the Man of the Future" – 3:51; 13. "The Legend." – 2:05; 14. "Der Ehrgeiz." – 2:38; 15. "A self-service Selector." – 1:17; 16. "Elevator" – 3:47; 17. "Fresh Fish" – 3:47; 18. "11th" – 3:53; 19. "Der Ehrgeiz (long version)" – 2:56

== Release ==
Ehrgeiz was released in arcades in 1998 as a joint venture between Square and Namco. After the game's US release on the PlayStation, Square Electronic Arts sponsored the "Ehrgeiz Championship Tour," a series of contests in which players competed against one another playing the game. The contests were held at Electronics Boutique and Babbage's stores across America, beginning on July 10, 1999, in New York.

On September 28, 2000, Ehrgeiz was re-released as part of the Square Millennium Collection in Japan. It included a collectable digital clock and character diorama. The game was released on the PlayStation Network in Japan on July 9, 2008.

== Reception ==
Reception

Aggregate score
Aggregator	Score
GameRankings	76%

Review scores
Publication	Score
GameSpot	5.8/10
IGN	7.5/10
Next Generation	3/5
The Sydney Morning Herald	3.5/5

In Japan, Game Machine listed Ehrgeiz on their April 15, 1998 issue as being the sixth most-successful arcade game of the month.

Ehrgeiz sold over 222,000 copies in Japan by the end of 1998, and sold 340,937 copies in Japan by December 2004. It has scored a 32 out of 40 points by the Japanese gaming publication Famitsu. IGN rated the game a 7.5 or "Good", citing the game's beautiful graphics and presentation but noting both its generally simplistic gameplay and very difficult combination move executions. GameSpot concurred, writing that the blocking controls were "unintuitive" and generally disappointing minigames outweighed the games beautiful graphics and Full Motion Videos. In November 2000, the game was ranked #73 on the magazine's top 100 PlayStation games of all time. Ehrgeiz currently has an aggregate score of 76% on GameRankings based on twenty-one media outlets. Later reviews reflected the strange use of famous Square Enix characters with "generic moves" and primarily wrestling-based combat.

Next Generation reviewed the PlayStation version of the game, rating it three stars out of five, and stated that "Technologically speaking, Ehrgeiz is an impressive fighter, but it does have balance problems, especially the one-button gameplay of the one-player game. Still, it's good to see developers straying from the accepted formula with new fighting designs that truly work."

== See also ==
- Power Stone
- Tobal No. 1
- Destrega
- The Bouncer (video game)
