= The Bouncer (video game) =

2000 beat 'em up video game

- North American cover art
- Developer: DreamFactory
- Publishers: JP: Square; NA: Square Electronic Arts; PAL: Sony Computer Entertainment
- Directors: Takashi Tokita; Seiichi Ishii
- Producer: Shinji Hashimoto
- Designers: Yuichi Ninagawa; Hiroshi Takai
- Programmer: Taketoshi Nishimori
- Artist: Tetsuya Nomura
- Composers: Noriko Matsueda; Takahito Eguchi
- Platform: PlayStation 2
- Release: JP: December 23, 2000; NA: March 6, 2001; EU: June 22, 2001
- Genres: Beat 'em up, action role-playing
- Modes: Single-player, multiplayer

The Bouncer (Japanese: バウンサー, Hepburn: Baunsā) is a 2000 beat 'em up video game for the PlayStation 2 developed by DreamFactory and published by Square. It was released in Japan in December 2000, in North America by Square Electronic Arts in March 2001, and in Europe by Sony Computer Entertainment in June 2001. The game was produced by Shinji Hashimoto, co-directed by Takashi Tokita and Seiichi Ishii, and features character designs by Tetsuya Nomura, and music by Noriko Matsueda and Takahito Eguchi.

The game tells the story of three bouncers in the fictional city of Edge on a rescue mission to save their young friend from the Mikado Group, a solar technology megacorporation owned by the megalomaniacal Dauragon C. Mikado. The game is structured like a "playable action movie," with the plot unfolding differently depending on which character the player chooses for specific gameplay sequences.

The Bouncer was Square's first game released internationally on the PlayStation 2, and although it received considerable press coverage before its release, and was greatly anticipated as one of the marquee titles in the first batch of PS2 games, it was met with mixed reviews.

== Gameplay ==
Gameplay in The Bouncer. The player is controlling Volt. Sion and Kou are being controlled by the AI. The players' health is on the top left; the enemy's on the top right.

Controls in The Bouncer are similar to those in the Tobal series. Certain buttons denote high, middle, and low attacks, whilst others are used for jumping attacks, blocking, and special moves. Players have a health meter during gameplay, which, if depleted, means the player dies. Players also have a limited number of guard points available to them, although this is not represented by an onscreen meter. As the player blocks, the number of guard points diminish. When they are gone completely, the player can no longer block.

The game's combat uses ragdoll physics, which allows characters to be launched several feet into the air, making it possible to juggle enemies by striking them repeatedly. Enemies can also be thrown or otherwise knocked into one another, causing all of them to take damage at once.

=== Story Mode ===
The Bouncer is structured as a series of short gameplay segments interspersed with cinematic cutscenes that tell the game's story. With the Active Character Selection (ACS) system, when a cutscene concludes, the player is given the choice to control one of the three protagonists and proceed onto the next gameplay segment. The player then controls this character for the duration of the level, whilst the other two characters are controlled by the AI. At the conclusion of each gameplay segment, the player is able to spend Bouncer Points (BP), the game's equivalent of experience points, using the Point Exchange System. BPs can be used to boost the character's statistics (health, power and guard) and unlock new fighting moves. Spending BPs allows the character to level up, with their rank graded on a letter scale from G to A, and finally, an S-Rank.

Typical gameplay in The Bouncer consists of the player fighting groups of enemies using hand-to-hand combat techniques. Occasionally, one of the AI-controlled bouncers will do a taunt, prompting a button-press to activate a team attack ("Trinity Rush") which damages all enemies on screen. However, the Trinity Rush is ineffective against some bosses. In some instances, the player is also tasked with activities other than fighting, such as running through a series of hallways to avoid being caught in a flood, finding a keycard, or fooling enemies into thinking the player is one of them. In general, a gameplay segment ends when the player has either defeated all of the enemies in the area, has defeated a boss enemy, or has achieved a set goal.

=== Survival Mode ===
In addition to the main Story Mode, there is also a single-player survival mode. Spanning ten stages and fifty enemies, every time the player survives a round, the gameplay gets progressively more difficult. At the start of each stage, the player's health bar does not return to full, but remains where it was at the end of the previous stage.

=== Multiplayer ===
The Bouncer supports the PlayStation 2 multitap accessory, and the game's multiplayer Versus Mode supports up to four players simultaneously in the "Battle Royal" mode. Battle Royal can also be played by a single player against three AI-controlled opponents, or by two players against two AI-controlled opponents.

== Synopsis ==
Set in Edge, a modern-day metropolis run by the Mikado Group corporation led by Dauragon Mikado, the story opens at the Fate bar on Dog Street, where three bouncers are enjoying a quiet evening; the young boy Sion, the light-hearted Kou, and the intimidating but just Volt. Dominique, a new friend of Sion's, visits to gift Sion a new necklace from his favorite fashion line. Fate is then attacked by masked soldiers from Mikado who kidnap Dominique, and Sion pursues them with Kou and Volt in tow. They pursue signs of Dominique across Edge, splitting up in a few places and confronting agents of Mikado. These include Echidna, a supervisor who knows Volt; Kaldea, a former friend of Sion's turned through experimentation into a shapeshifter; and Mugetsu, a soldier driven insane by enhancement experiments. Each protagonist has their own routes which impact story sequences, and backstory elements during loading screens in their routes.

- Sion Barzahd was Kaldea's childhood friend and the adopted student of Wong Leung, a master martial artist who held old ties with the Mikado Group. Wong Leung later mysteriously disappeared to train Dauragon, and Kaldea later died in their teenage years in an industrial accident while working as an intern at Mikado. These experiences left Sion both emotionally scarred and eventually suicidally depressed, leading him to pick violent street fights in Edge's dangerous slums as a way to end his life. He was taken in by Fate after being beaten by Volt in a fist fight, then encountered Dominique on the streets and decided to care for her.
- Kou Leifoh is an undercover operative under Leann Caldwell, assigned by the anti-Mikado intelligence agency LUKIS to watch over Dominique. His distinctive full-body tattoo was a requirement for his mission so he could blend in on Dog Street. His real identity is Kou Hurst, the Hurst family being once prestigious in Edge, before being overshadowed by the Mikado Group.
- Volt Krueger was a former Mikado employee loyal to Dauragon's adoptive father and previous head of the Mikado Group, Master Mikado. Soon rising to become Mikado's most dedicated and elite bodyguard, this came to earn the jealousy of Echidna, and when he attempted to fight against Dauragon, he was framed for Master Mikado's death and almost died. Taken in by the staff of Fate, he obscured facial scarring from his escape using face piercings. Originally, he was a street gang leader who was hired by a younger Dauragon to take out Master Mikado, but joined his ranks upon Mikado displaying no fear towards his former assailant, commandeering his respect.

During their missions, they learn that Dominique is an android created in the image of Dauragon's late sister, and he is planning to destroy Edge and take over the world as an act of revenge, as he blames society for their abandonment on the streets and his sister's death due to the failure of Edge's social systems. Echidna is defeated and eventually abandons Mikado. Kaldea's exact fate depends on who is selected to fight her, though in all routes she ultimately dies. Mugetsu is killed by the group after Dominique is taken to a rocket heading for a new satellite designed by Dauragon to destroy Edge. With help from Leann, the three reach the satellite in a shuttle, freeing Dominique and defeating Dauragon as the satellite is destroyed. Depending on the final character selected, the ending scene varies; Sion is shown happy with Dominique, Volt meets Echidna again, while Kou opts to remain assigned to Dominique which leads into a fight with Leann just to test him. A series of post-credit stills shows Dominique, wearing Sion's necklace, visiting the graves of her friends, indicating that she possesses immortality due to being an android. A small lost dog appears, and Dominique holds it with affection while smiling. In Sion's route, a further scene depicts when he and Dominique first met inside a tunnel on a rainy street.

== Development ==
The game was announced at the Spring Tokyo Game Show in March 1999, where it was revealed as Square's first PlayStation 2 title. On July 12, 1999, IGN reported that Square was working on three PlayStation 2 games; an unknown game, a Final Fantasy game and a fighting game, which was thought to be Ehrgeiz 2. Footage of the game was subsequently shown at the SIGGRAPH Convention in August, at which time the game was still thought to be Ehrgeiz 2. The footage showed the three main characters, which at that time were two men and one woman, fighting a group of ninja in a café. However, on August 23, MagicBox.com reported the game was not a sequel, but an original story. The title of the game was revealed on September 10, when Sony announced the PlayStation 2 launch titles.

A non-playable demo was shown at the Fall Tokyo Game Show in September. IGN reported "Square's "Seamless Action Battle System" means that players will roam from adventure sequence to fighting sequence without intermittent FMVs or cutscenes that look out of place; the adventure aspects blend seamlessly into massive street brawls involving as many ten characters." GameSpot were also very enthusiastic about the early footage from the game, writing "The Bouncer is arguably one of the strongest visual demonstrations of the PlayStation 2 hardware thus far. Designed to appear as though you're controlling characters in a movie, The Bouncer's camera movements and special effects truly appear as though they're straight out of a Hollywood creation."

At the Spring Tokyo Game Show in March 2000, Square showed only a ten-second clip of the game, and revealed no new screenshots or information. They also had no release date, leading some journalists to speculate there may be problems behind the scenes. At E3 in May, Square showed some new footage from the game, although they still did not provide a playable demo. IGN was underwhelmed with the new material, feeling there appeared to be too many cutscenes in relation to actual gameplay. On July 13, GameSpot revealed the game's character designs were being handled by Tetsuya Nomura, and the game would receive a simultaneous North American/Japanese release in late 2000. However, on September 1, IGN reported DreamFactory were having difficulty working with the PlayStation 2's hardware, and the game had been pushed back to January 2001.

On September 19, IGN revealed that the game would feature Dolby Digital 5.1 Surround Sound for the FMV cutscenes, and Square were attempting to use 5.1 sound for gameplay sections as well. GameSpot revealed more details about the game on September 20, including the three available modes of play: Story, Versus and Survival. They reported that Square expected the story mode to take players roughly seven to eight hours to complete thoroughly.

The selling point of an "action game" is the feeling of oneness with the character, but on the other hand, action games lack characterization and story development. RPGs can cover most of these narrative factors, but command input-type RPGs sacrifice the tempo, thrill factor, and the feeling of immediacy. The Bouncer's system is a combination of the best elements from these two genres.

— Takashi Tokita, co-director

On September 21, IGN published a roundtable interview with members of the development team; character designer Tetsuya Nomura, composers Noriko Matsueda and Takahito Eguchi, and co-director Takashi Tokita. The developers outlined the gameplay mechanics, the branching story, the versus and survival modes, the music, the character design, and the challenges of working on the PlayStation 2 for the first time. Tokita claimed the most difficult aspect of the game's creation was working with the PlayStation 2's hardware. The team also said the gameplay was partially derived from DreamFactory's Ehrgeiz and Tobal games, while graphically, the atmosphere was developed with the use of filters and lighting.

On November 13, Square announced a Japanese release date of December 23. On December 18, they confirmed a North American release date of January 30, 2001, although this was quickly pushed back to March.

The game uses the bloom shader effect to soften rough edges.

=== Audio ===
The Bouncer was the first PlayStation 2 game to feature Dolby 5.1 sound, which was used specifically for the FMV sequences. In addition, it features voice acting with subtitles in both English and Japanese. Because the game was being considered for a North American release early in production, the English voices were recorded first. The Japanese voices were recorded and incorporated later to "provide more of a DVD quality to the game."

== Soundtrack ==
The Bouncer was scored by Noriko Matsueda and Takahito Eguchi. The game contains several vocal themes, including the original Japanese ending theme song "Forevermore" ("Owaranaimono"), performed by Reiko Noda, and the English-language theme song "Love Is the Gift", performed by Shanice Wilson. Takashi Tokita has commented that the lyrics of "Love Is the Gift", heard during the closing credits, signify the game's overall theme.

Two separate soundtracks were released; one in Japan and one in North America. The Japanese version, The Bouncer Original Soundtrack, is a 2-disc, 29-track album, published on March 23, 2001, by DigiCube.

The Bouncer Original Soundtrack
No.	Title	Length
1.	"Prelude"	0:42
2.	"Prologue"	4:29
3.	"Disquietude"	1:57
4.	"Tension"	1:59
5.	"The Escape"	2:06
6.	"Melody of Reminiscence"	2:17
7.	"Infiltration"	1:52
8.	"LUKIS Covert Op."	1:36
9.	"Reminiscence"	0:14
10.	"Distant Rain: The Cross Children"	2:05
11.	"Mikado's Plot: A Foolish Utopia"	2:39
12.	"The Pursuit"	1:39
13.	"Affection"	2:49
14.	"Owaranaimono"	6:30
15.	"Sion Barzahd"	3:27
16.	"Volt Kruger"	3:50
17.	"Kou Leifoh"	3:16
18.	"Echidna"	2:56
19.	"Mugetsu"	3:06
20.	"Kaldea Orchid"	4:29
21.	"PD-4"	2:54
22.	"Dominique Cross"	3:17
23.	"Wong Leung"	3:58
24.	"Leann Caldwell"	3:58
25.	"Mugetsu: Destruction"	3:58
26.	"Dauragon C. Mikado"	3:58
27.	"Dauragon C. Mikado: Madness"	3:35
28.	"Dauragon C. Mikado: Awakening"	3:29
29.	"Sion Barzahd: Jet Black"	4:13

The North American version, The Bouncer Original Video Game Soundtrack, is a single disc, 21-track album, published on March 26, 2001, by Tokyopop Soundtrax.

The Bouncer Original Video Game Soundtrack
No.	Title	Length
1.	"Prelude"	0:42
2.	"Sion Barzahd"	3:27
3.	"Volt Krueger"	3:50
4.	"Kou Leifoh"	3:16
5.	"Echidna"	2:56
6.	"Mugetsu"	3:05
7.	"Kaldea Orchid"	4:29
8.	"PD-4"	2:55
9.	"Dominique Cross"	3:17
10.	"Mugetsu: Destruction"	3:28
11.	"Dauragon C. Mikado"	3:58
12.	"Dauragon C. Mikado: Madness"	3:35
13.	"Dauragon C. Mikado: Awakening"	3:29
14.	"Prologue"	2:52
15.	"Disquietude"	1:56
16.	"The Escape"	2:03
17.	"LUKIS Covert Op."	1:36
18.	"Distant Rain: The Cross Children"	2:05
19.	"The Pursuit"	1:39
20.	"Owaranaimono"	6:33
21.	"Kou Leifoh (Remixed)"	3:31

== Reception ==
Reception

Aggregate score
Aggregator	Score
Metacritic	66/100

Review scores
Publication	Score
Famitsu	31/40
GamePro	4.5/5
GameRevolution	C+
GameSpot	6.7/10
IGN	7/10
Next Generation	2/5
Official U.S. PlayStation Magazine	3/5
Play	76%

The Bouncer received "mixed or average reviews," and holds an aggregate score of 66 out of 100 on Metacritic, based on twenty reviews.

With the consideration of its high-profile development team, as well as the fact that it was a front-runner PlayStation 2 release, The Bouncer was highly anticipated. However, the game was perceived as a disappointment by many, and was largely seen as mediocre. Numerous aspects from the E3 trailer, such as destructible scenery, were removed in the final game, possibly in order to get the game out in time to be among the first batch of PlayStation 2 titles. Much of the criticism, however, fell on the gameplay. IGN found the controls average and the camera angles to become a major issue in the later portions of the game, where the player is confined to tight spaces. The game was also seen as having an excessive amount of cutscenes and load screens. GameCritics' Brad Galloway, for example, argued actual gameplay constitutes less than one third of the game's length.

IGN's Douglass C. Perry reviewed an import version of the game prior to its release in North America, and was disappointed with the lack of depth, but impressed by other aspects. He praised the graphics, character design and CGI cutscenes. He was also impressed with the "glowing" effect used throughout the game; "DreamFactory employs a Playboy-like filter that smoothes out every single bit on the screen. The effect is consistent throughout the game, and rids the PS2 of aliasing or flickering, but also provides a unique gloss that's never been used before with such success." He concluded that, "despite the disappointments, I am absolutely having a great time with The Bouncer." In his official review of the game upon its North American release, Perry scored it 7 out of 10, writing "The game is a letdown, but not a catastrophic one. [...] It's a good game, not a great one, and it's worth a look." He referred to Story Mode as a "mixed bag of good ideas executed ineffectively," although he praised multiplayer mode. He concluded "The Bouncer is not the next messiah, it's not the next wave of fighting, and frankly, it's not the paradigm for anything really new, except perhaps incredible-looking graphics. These things said, The Bouncer is a decent game. It's not horrible, it's not brilliant. It's pretty average."

In his look at the import version, GameSpot's Miguel Lopez called the game "little more than a glorified and highly cinematic version of Final Fight using dated Tobal animations." He called the graphics "quite competent," but was highly critical of the game's length, estimating a player could play through the entire game in 45 minutes or less, if they skipped cutscenes. In his full review, Jeff Gerstmann scored the game 6.7 out of 10. Of the graphics, he said "Everything, from the characters to the backgrounds, looks absolutely incredible." He concluded "The Bouncer makes a great showpiece for the PlayStation 2. It looks and sounds incredible. However, the ease and extremely short length of the game, matched with other problems like horrific camera angles and lack of a multiplayer story mode, make The Bouncer fair, at best." It was a runner-up for GameSpot's annual "Most Disappointing Game" award among console games, which went to Luigi's Mansion.

Game Revolution's Brian Gee awarded the game a C+. He wrote, "It's easy to tell what the developers focused on, because The Bouncer is obviously one of the best-looking games on a console to date. Near flawless animations and picture perfect visuals make it a great choice to show off the sleek Sony super machine to your friends. Once the game begins, though, The Bouncer sheds it's [sic] pretty boy image and gets down and dirty." He was critical of the controls and the absence of a lock-on feature. Like other critics, he also had problems with the camera and the ratio of cutscenes to gameplay. He concluded "Though many will undoubtedly be disappointed by The Bouncer's inability to live up to the hype, others will find a fancy beat 'em up to pass a few hours. Its flashy graphics are at least worth taking a look at, but its many problems just might keep it from a place in the collection."

GamePro were more impressed, scoring the game 4.5 out 5, and writing "The Bouncer slickly combines copious amounts of hard-hitting moves with a stellar story line all in a visually stunning world."

Blake Fischer reviewed the PlayStation 2 version of the game for Next Generation, rating it two stars out of five, and stated that "The Bouncer manages to look good, but don't let that fool you into thinking that it's very fun."

=== Sales ===
In its debut week in Japan, it sold 158,727 units, debuting as the fifth highest selling game across all systems. It went on to sell 219,858 units by the end of 2000, finishing as the 53rd highest selling game of the year, across all systems, and the 9th highest selling PlayStation 2 game of the year. It sold an additional 126,123 units in 2001, for a total of 345,981 units sold in Japan.

The game received a Gold Prize from the 2001 PlayStation Awards for over 500,000 units sold in Asia. In the United States, the game sold 240,670 units. In total, the game sold over 740,670 units in Asia and the United States.

== See also ==
- Ehrgeiz: God Bless the Ring
- Tobal No. 1
