= UFC: Tapout =

2002 video game

- Developer: DreamFactory
- Publishers: NA: Crave Entertainment; JP: Capcom; EU: Crave/Ubi Soft
- Platform: Xbox
- Release: NA: February 19, 2002; JP: April 18, 2002; EU: September 20, 2002
- Genres: Versus fighting, Sports
- Modes: Single-player, multiplayer

UFC: Tapout, also known as Ultimate Fighting Championship: Tapout and UFC 2: Tapout (UFC2 タップアウト, UFC2 Tappuauto) in Japan, is a 2002 fighting video game developed by DreamFactory for the Xbox. It is based upon the Ultimate Fighting Championship. The subtitle Tapout refers to a fighter tapping his hand, indicating that he has submitted to a submission hold. A tapout, along with a knockout, judge's decision, and referee stoppage, is one of the ways of ending a UFC bout.

The game features many of UFC's top stars including Matt Hughes, Chuck Liddell, Mark Coleman, Frank Shamrock, and Tito Ortiz. Competitions can take place in several modes such as exhibition, tournament, arcade, and championship mode. Several fighters throughout the game are unlockable, such as two female competitors and celebrity Ice-T.

A sequel to this game entitled UFC: Tapout 2 was released in 2003. Other than an updated roster, the game is very similar to the first Tapout and received similar reviews. Tapout 2 was published by TDK Mediactive. Both games have an ESRB rating of T for Teen.

== Reception ==
Reception

Aggregate score
Aggregator	Score
Metacritic	74/100

Review scores
Publication	Score
Electronic Gaming Monthly	5.83/10
Famitsu	30/40
Game Informer	8.25/10
GamePro	4/5 stars
GameSpot	8.6/10
GameSpy	68%
GameZone	8.2/10
IGN	8.3/10
Official Xbox Magazine (US)	9/10
TeamXbox	5.1/10

UFC: Tapout received "average" reviews according to the review aggregation website Metacritic. In Japan, where the game was ported for release under the name UFC 2: Tapout (UFC2 タップアウト, UFC2 Tappuauto) and published by Capcom on April 18, 2002, Famitsu gave it a score of 30 out of 40.

GameSpot named it the third-best video game of February 2002.

== See also ==
- List of fighting games
