= UFC: Tapout 2 =

2003 video game

- Developer: DreamFactory
- Publisher: TDK Mediactive
- Platform: Xbox
- Release: NA: March 20, 2003
- Genres: Versus fighting, Sports
- Modes: Single-player, multiplayer

UFC: Tapout 2 is a 2003 fighting video game developed by DreamFactory and published by TDK Mediactive for the Xbox. It is based upon the Ultimate Fighting Championship (UFC). The game is a sequel to UFC: Tapout. The sequel game was released in North America on March 20, 2003, for the Xbox console. The subtitle Tapout refers to a fighter tapping his hand indicating that he has submitted to a submission hold. A tapout, along with a knockout, judge's decision, and referee stoppage, is one of the ways of ending a UFC bout.

== Roster ==
Before its release, Crave Entertainment revealed that "UFC: Tapout 2 will feature an enhanced roster of real-life mixed martial arts superstars, the most of any UFC game to date. Confirmed on the roster are UFC notables Tito "The Huntington Beach Bad Boy" Ortiz, Chuck "The Iceman" Liddell, Carlos Newton, Pat Miletich, and B.J. Penn. Released screenshots also show off character models for "Big Daddy" Gary Goodridge, "King of the Streets" Marco Ruas, Bas Rutten, and Jeremy Horn. One of the new fighters making his debut in UFC: Tapout 2 is Middleweight Champion Murilo Bustamante."

According to GameFAQs, the game also features the following unlockable fighters:

- Big John McCarthy by winning a silver belt with all characters in Championship Mode.
- Bruce Buffer by winning 33 consecutive matches in Arcade Mode.
- Larry Landless by winning a silver belt with all but 1 character in Championship Mode.
- Mask by winning a gold belt with all but 1 regular character in Legend Mode.
- Skyscrape by winning a gold belt with all regular characters in Legend Mode.

== Development ==
In Summer 2002, almost a year before its release, Crave Entertainment asserted that "Tapout 2 will feature a completely overhauled core game engine. 'With the changes in the engine, an enhanced AI, upgraded career mode, and new fighting moves, we're practically putting the gamer right in the middle of The Octagon,' said Rob Sandberg, senior producer at Crave Entertainment. 'Tapout 2 will look and play noticeably different from any previous version, and I think fighting game fans will be very impressed.'" As later reviews from March 2003 demonstrate, Tapout 2 was ultimately published by TDK Mediactive and developed by DreamFactory.

== Reception ==
Reception

Aggregate score
Aggregator	Score
Metacritic	66/100

Review scores
Publication	Score
Electronic Gaming Monthly	5.83/10
Game Informer	6.25/10
GamePro	4/5
GameSpot	6.7/10
GameSpy	2/5
GameZone	8/10
IGN	7.1/10
Official Xbox Magazine (US)	8/10
TeamXbox	6/10
X-Play	2/5

The game received "average" reviews according to the review aggregation website Metacritic. Four-Eyed Dragon of GamePro said, "UFC: Tapout 2 is a solid sequel and a well-rounded brawler. The latest showing of this brutally realistic fighter franchise proves that this series can go the distance, despite its rollercoaster ride on other systems." Jeff Gerstmann of GameSpot said, "Overall, UFC: Tapout 2 has some strengths, but they're the same strengths that the previous Tapout game had. The game doesn't really bring anything new to the genre, and the game's AI flaws make it a very dull single-player experience. Even devout fans of the sport would be better off with the previous Tapout game, or, if they own a PlayStation 2, THQ's Pride FC." Hilary Goldstein of IGN said that if "you didn't buy the first Tapout, then the sequel is definitely a worthy pick-up. The game's a lot of fun for both single and multiplayer. However, if you've played the original, this one really isn't worth the $50. While there are improvements and more fighters, it's just not enough to merit spending that much money. If you see it later for $20 or maybe even $30, definitely grab it, but I was pretty disappointed in how little was changed. This series needs an overhaul next year if it's to go anywhere besides down the drain."

== See also ==
- List of fighting games
