= Kakuto Chojin: Back Alley Brutal =

2002 video game

- North American cover art
- Developers: Microsoft Game Studios Japan; Dream Publishing
- Publisher: Microsoft Game Studios
- Director: Kunihiko Nakata
- Producer: Yoshikatsu Kanemaru
- Designers: Seiichi Ishii; Kunihiko Nakata
- Writer: Makoto Goya
- Composer: Hiroshi Utsuyama
- Platform: Xbox
- Release: NA: November 12, 2002; JP: January 1, 2003
- Genre: Fighting
- Modes: Single-player, Multiplayer

Kakuto Chojin: Back Alley Brutal (Kakuto Chojin for short), known in Japan as Kakutō Chōjin: Fighting Super Heroes (格闘超人 ファイティング スーパーヒーローズ, Kakutō Chōjin Faitingu Sūpāhīrōzu), is a fighting game developed by Microsoft Game Studios Japan and Dream Publishing and published by Microsoft Game Studios for the Xbox. The game was the sole product of developer Dream Publishing, a studio created by members of DreamFactory and Microsoft. It was originally created as a tech demo to show off the graphic capabilities of the Xbox, before the decision was made to turn it into a full game. A few months after its release, Kakuto Chojin was pulled from distribution amidst controversy surrounding the religious content featured in the game.

== Gameplay ==
Kakuto Chojin is a fighting game generally set in a three-dimensional arena, similar to 2001 games such as Tecmo’s Dead or Alive 3 and Namco’s Tekken 4. There are thirteen fighters, each with their own arena. Each character has two styles of fighting; the "Kakuto" style is the only one available at first, with the "Chojin" style acquired after beating Story mode with a character. Kakuto Chojin attempts a different fighting system in that it lacks buttons meant specifically to punch and kick, instead assigning controls to high, middle and low attacks, along with the ability to unleash a special attack. The left trigger allows for free movement around an arena, while the right trigger is used for blocking and an attack modifier. Besides the Story mode, there are the standard Practice and Vs. modes. Kakuto Chojin allows for a Battle Royale with four players at once.

== Characters ==
- (Somalia) Asad – A well-respected Muay Thai practitioner and deeply religious man, Asad joined the tournament to gain revenge on Daeva for setting his village ablaze. Unknown to Asad, his village's destruction was used to goad him into entering the tournament for the purpose of being studied by Daeva and her organization.
- Vittoria – A fighter from Spain, she works for Interpol and studied criminology and combat. Enters Drasuka to find her missing brother who she believes has also entered the 'Fist of Fire' Tournament.
- (France) Sabre – A brute force fighter, well known in Drasuka for his strong style and the crowd loves it. Daeva enters him in the Fist of Fire tournament so he can prove himself for a top place in Daeva's inner ring.
- (United States) J.D. Stone – Even though he appears to be a "nice guy", Stone has a definite mean streak and ruthlessness when it comes to pit fighting. Leaving the military after an ambush killed his best buddies, he enters the Fist of Fire tournament after hearing rumors Daeva was behind the attack.
- Rena – Daughter of a wealthy Japanese family, Rena was raised in São Paulo, Brazil. As a child, she learned capoeira and grew to master it. A child of wealth, she had the luxury of traveling with her father across the world as a young girl. Always wishing for independence, Rena has been forced to follow her father's will her entire life. Having to move back to Japan with her father, she began to grow restless. Hearing about a secret tournament where the winner can have anything they want, Rena came up with a plan: win the tournament and gain independence from her father. "Borrowing" some cash from her dad, Rena sneaked off to Drasuka Bay to fight in the tournament, and with luck, gain the freedom she so desperately seeks.
- (Hong Kong) (China) Khan – Serving as Daeva's right-hand man, Khan is a sadistic and, quite clearly, insane man who almost seems to enjoy his occupation and his ability to inflict pain on anyone he is ordered to deal with.
- (Argentina) Crusher Ramirez – A professional wrestler who has fought in virtually all parts of the world. However, given the fact that he is suspended from every major wrestling federation because of his viciousness, he has earned a reputation that no wrestling promoter would be willing to touch. But now he's found a new home of wrestling in Drasuka where he can release his boundless anger and willingness to do anything to get the win.
- Shadow – Genetically enhanced, a cyborg, or something far darker? Shadow's origins are clouded in mystery. Displaying incredible ninjutsu skills and incredible strength, whatever Shadow is, it's clearly not fully human. With a mask concealing his features, Shadow is a faceless, heartless, merciless force in combat. He is a killer, having slain more fighters than anyone in Drasuka. Whatever the truth is behind Shadow, it's been made abundantly clear he's not one to trifle with.
- (United States) Roxy – Roxy's father, a political militant, urged her at an early age to study a variety of martial arts with the best masters all over the world. Khan, her master in Hong Kong, betrayed he trust and tortured her. She escaped, becoming an assassin and mercenary. Currently employed by a Japanese businessman who is actually a crime lord from Maladinia, she still hungers for revenge against Khan. Roxy recently volunteered to search for her boss' daughter in Drasuka, discovering Khan was also there. Entering the tournament, she seeks vengeance against her former master.
- (Japan) Reiji – Adopted by a Jeet Kune Do master, Reiji fights in the style of the famous Bruce Lee. Growing up learning martial arts from his adoptive father, he never understood why this man had left the city for the countryside. Following his twenty-sixth birthday, Reiji returned home to discover his father being assaulted by a mysterious group of men. His father was brutally murdered before him, Reiji was hung up and cut sacrificial animal. Surviving, though barely, his purpose became vengeance against his attackers. With the police offering no help, Reiji set off on his own. After a year of traveling, Reiji found the picture of the man who had tortured him and murdered his father in a newspaper article describing an underground fighting tournament in Drasuka.
- (Norway) Vegard – Born into an upper-class Norwegian family, Vegard enjoyed a privileged childhood. His father practiced ancient rituals in the belief that it would help him become even more successful. During his studies, a fortune-teller predicted his son would one day face a great evil that would arise from within. Fearful of his safety, Vegard's parents put him through rigorous academic and physical training. He excelled in taekwondo, though no other students dared face him for fear of injury due to his brutality. Unfortunately, the pressure of his parents' expectancy and the dark destiny foretold caused him to withdraw from the world around him, leaving nothing but his dark thoughts. Vegard became fascinated with a mask kept in his father's art collection—an iron mask depicting the face of a violent, confused soul. Stealing the mask, he wandered the world, wearing it to the point of only being at "peace" with it on. Eventually, he found himself in Drasuka, eagerly accepting an invite to an underground tournament.
- (China) Yin Kai Li – Raised by a traditional Chinese family, soon falls for the street/gang life after they moved to a northern province. Runs away to join the Fist of Fire tournament after rebelling against his father, in hopes of meeting two fighters, Reiji and Sabre, of whom he is jealous.
- Daeva –

== Development ==
Kakuto Chojin: Back Alley Brutal was developed by Microsoft's Japanese game division and Dream Publishing, a subsidiary of the fighting game company DreamFactory and publisher Microsoft Game Studios. The game was first introduced as "Project K-X", a technology demonstration for Microsoft's then-new Xbox console, at the Spring Tokyo Game Show in 2001. Seiichi Ishii, head of the project's development, stated that the prototype only ran at a frame rate of 30 frames per second, but was doubled when the team molded the demo into a finished product.

== Reception ==
Reception

Aggregate score
Aggregator	Score
Metacritic	46/100

Review scores
Publication	Score
AllGame	2/5
Edge	2/10
Electronic Gaming Monthly	3.17/10
Famitsu	(Xbox) 30/40; 27/40
Game Informer	6.25/10
GamePro	2.5/5
GameRevolution	D
GameSpot	5.5/10
GameSpy	2.5/5
GameZone	7/10
IGN	6.2/10
Official Xbox Magazine (US)	6.2/10

Kakuto Chojin, though heavily hyped and praised for its graphics, received "generally unfavorable reviews" according to the review aggregation website Metacritic. Critics and gamers cited its shallow gameplay, weak Story mode, and lack of bonus material. Game Informer described it as a Tekken ripoff; coincidentally, a portion of the Kakuto Chojin development team were indeed ex-Tekken developers (including series creator Seiichi Ishii). In Japan, Famitsu gave it a score of two sevens, one six, and one seven for a total of 27 out of 40, while Famitsu Xbox gave it a score of one seven, one six, one nine, and one eight for a total of 30 out of 40.

=== Controversy ===
Kakuto Chojin was pulled off store shelves in early 2003 due to accusations of containing offensive religious content. The recall allegedly stemmed from Quran verses chanted in the background of the theme song for Muslim character Asad. Microsoft senior geopolitical strategist Kate Edwards consulted with an unidentified Arabic speaker within the company. This latter person vehemently objected to the release of Kakuto Chojin due to its "incredible insult to Islam"; the game still debuted in North America in the publisher's belief that the content would not be noticed. According to a Microsoft spokesperson, the company was pressured into destroying un-shipped units of Kakuto Chojin containing the chant and attempted to reissue the game as an amended product. However, many uncensored copies still inadvertently made it to retailers. This included locales in which such material is particularly sensitive, like Saudi Arabia, where the issue became headlines news. Three months later, the Saudi Arabian government formally protested, forcing Microsoft to withdraw the game worldwide.
