= PrideGP Grand Prix 2003 =

2003 video game

- Developer(s): DreamFactory
- Publisher(s): Capcom
- Composer(s): Yasuharu Takanashi
- Platform(s): PS2
- Release: JP: November 2003
- Genre(s): Fighting
- Mode(s): Single-player, multiplayer

PrideGP Grand Prix 2003 is a mixed martial arts video game developed by DreamFactory and published by Capcom for the PlayStation 2. It was released in Japan on November 13, 2003. It is based on the Pride Fighting Championships (Pride FC).
