= DreamFactory (game company) =

Japanese video game developer

DreamFactory Co., Ltd.
- Native name: 株式会社ドリームファクトリー
- Type: Public
- Industry: Video games
- Founded: November 1995
- Headquarters: Shinagawa, Tokyo, Japan
- Key people: Ken Fujikawa, CEO; Seiichi Ishii, chairman
- Revenue: ¥500 million (2003-2004)
- Number of employees: 18
- Website: drf.co.jp

DreamFactory Co., Ltd. (Note: Japanese: 株式会社ドリームファクトリー, Hepburn: Kabushiki-gaisha DorīmuFakutorī) is a Japanese video game developer founded in 1995, based out of Tokyo. They are best known for developing fighting and beat 'em up games, such as the Tobal No. 1 fighting game series and the high-profile PlayStation 2 title The Bouncer, both developed under Square Co. The company's chairman, Seiichi Ishii, is an industry veteran who served as an early designer and director for two fighting game franchises: Virtua Fighter (published by Sega) and Tekken (published by Namco).

== Products ==
=== Video games ===
==== Arcade ====
- Ehrgeiz: God Bless the Ring (1998)
- Kenju (2005)

==== PlayStation ====
- Tobal No. 1 (1996)
- Tobal 2 (1997)
- Ehrgeiz: God Bless the Ring (1998)

==== PlayStation 2 ====
- The Bouncer (2000)
- PrideGP Grand Prix 2003 (2003)
- Crimson Tears (2004)
- Yoshitsuneki (2005)
- Fighting Beauty Wulong (2006)
- Appleseed EX (2007)
- Ikki Tousen: Shining Dragon (2007)

==== Xbox ====
- Ultimate Fighting Championship: Tapout (2002)
- Kakuto Chojin: Back Alley Brutal (2003) (as Dream Publishing)
- UFC: Tapout 2 (2003)

==== Nintendo DS ====
- Naruto: Ninja Destiny (2006)
- Simple DS Series Vol. 16: The Sagasou: Fushigi na Konchuu no Mori (2007)
- Simple DS Series Vol. 32: The Zombie Crisis (2008)
- Naruto: Ninja Destiny II: European Version (2008)
- Naruto Shippuden: Ninja Destiny 2 (2008)
- Naruto Shippuden: Shinobi Retsuden 3 (2009)

==== Wii ====
- Major Wii: Perfect Closer (2008)
- Toshinden (2009)

==== iOS ====
Xevious ガンプの謎はすべて解けた!? (2016)

==== Android ====
Xevious ガンプの謎はすべて解けた!? (2016)

=== Animation ===
- Zoids: New Century (2001)
- Appleseed (2004)

=== Others ===
- LiveAnimation (2010-)
