= Seiichi Ishii =

Japanese video game designer (born 1967)

- Born: 石井 精 August 18, 1967 (age 59); Ichinomiya City, Aichi Prefecture, Japan
- Occupation: Video game designer

Seiichi Ishii (石井 精一 Ishii Seiichi, born August 18, 1967) is a Japanese game designer. He is best known for the development of fighting games. He was a designer on groundbreaking Sega titles, Virtua Racing and Virtua Fighter. Ishii was also a designer and director for the first Tekken game in 1994 and Tekken 2 in 1995.

== Biography ==
Ishii was born in Ichinomiya City, Aichi Prefecture, Japan. He established his own company, DreamFactory in November 1995, through Sega and Namco, expanding his fighting game pedigree to create titles such as, Tobal No. 1, Ehrgeiz, and The Bouncer.

In 2017, it was reported that Ishii relocated to Montreal, Canada in 2003 with his family after being ill. This is due to health concerns from work stress that his doctors advised him to change his working environment. In a July 2024 interview, he said that he's willing to move back as long he can take the lead in creating a game based on a DAO (decentralized autonomous organization) model.

== Games developed ==
Title	Year released	Platform	Role
Virtua Racing	1992	Sega Model 1	Game Design
Virtua Fighter	1993	Sega Model 1	Coordinator / Game Design
Tekken	1994	Namco System 11, PlayStation	Director / Game Design
Tekken 2	1995	Namco System 11	Director / Game Design
Tobal No. 1	1996	PlayStation	Director / Game Design
Tobal 2	1997	PlayStation	Director / Game Design
Street Fighter EX Plus α	1997	PlayStation	Special Thanks
Ehrgeiz: God Bless the Ring	1998	Namco System 12, PlayStation	Director / Game Design
The Bouncer	2000	PlayStation 2	Director / Game Design
Kakuto Chojin: Back Alley Brutal	2002	Xbox	Game Design
Crimson Tears	2004	PlayStation 2	Scenario, Supervision
