= Tobal No. 1 =

1996 video game

- North American cover art
- Developer: DreamFactory
- Publishers: JP: Square; WW: Sony Computer Entertainment
- Director: Seiichi Ishii
- Producer: Koji Yamashita
- Artist: Akira Toriyama
- Composers: Masashi Hamauzu; Kenji Ito; Yasuhiro Kawakami; Noriko Matsueda; Yasunori Mitsuda; Junya Nakano; Ryuji Sasai; Yoko Shimomura; GUIDO (Note: Hidenobu Otsuki and Hiroshi Hata; arrangement and additional composition)
- Platform: PlayStation
- Release: JP: August 2, 1996; NA: October 31, 1996; PAL: January 10, 1997
- Genre: Fighting
- Modes: Single-player, multiplayer

Tobal No. 1 (Note: Japanese: トバル ナンバーワン, Hepburn: Tobaru Nanbā Wan) is a 1996 fighting game developed by DreamFactory and published by Square for the PlayStation.

The game's mechanics were designed with the aid of fighting game designer Seiichi Ishii, who previously contributed to Virtua Fighter and Tekken, while all the characters were designed by Akira Toriyama. Packaged with both the North American and Japanese version of the game was a sampler disc featuring a pre-release playable demo of Final Fantasy VII and video previews of Final Fantasy Tactics, Bushido Blade, and SaGa Frontier.

Tobal No. 1 received a mainly positive reception and was commercially popular in Japan. It was a cult hit in North America. The 1997 sequel, Tobal 2, was never released in North America and Europe.

== Gameplay ==
Tobal No. 1 has a tournament mode, two player versus mode, practice mode, and the unique quest mode, all of which utilize the same fighting system. The game runs at up to a smooth 60 frames per second due to its lack of textured polygons and reduced details which gave the game a distinctive look in comparison to other fighting games at the time. The game's controls allow full freedom of movement in the ring as long as the player faces the opponent. The player has the ability to dash and jump, and certain buttons execute high, medium, and low attacks for each character. Tobal No. 1 also has a grappling and blocking system, offering the player a variety of throws and counter moves.

The "Quest Mode" combines the game's fighting controls with three-dimensional dungeon exploration. The player must advance down a number of floors, contend with traps, and engage in fights with a variety of enemies including the game's playable characters. Several items can be found, dropped by enemies, or bought using crystals. These items can be picked up, consumed, or thrown at enemies, and include foodstuffs that can restore the player's HP or potions that have a range of effects including raising the player's maximum health or bringing it down to 1 point. There is no way to save one's progress, and dying means starting over from the beginning. Defeating certain characters in this mode unlocks them as playable characters in the game's other modes.

== Plot ==
Tobal No. 1 takes place in the year 2048 on a fictional planet called Tobal, which has large deposits of Molmoran, an ore that can be used as an energy source. The planet's 98th tournament is held to determine who has the rights to the ore. A number of humans and aliens compete for the title. The game's plot and character backstories are only explored in the instruction manual. All of the initial eight playable characters receive the same ending.

The game's immediately playable characters include Chuji Wu, Oliems, Epon, Hom, Fei Pusu, Mary Ivonskaya, Ill Goga, and Gren Kutz. Bosses include Nork, Mufu, and the emperor Udan. All bosses are unlockable after defeating them in Dungeon Mode except Nork. Instead, the game allows the player to select Snork (Small Nork), a pint-sized version of the very large character. There is also one secret fighter named Toriyama Robo (named for Akira Toriyama) who is unlockable if the player can complete the 30-floor Udan's Dungeon level in the quest mode. Toriyama Robo is not seen at any point in the game except at the very end of the dungeon.

== Development and release ==
Tobal No. 1 was developed by Japanese studio DreamFactory, which was established as a subsidiary of publisher Square to create that company's first fighting game and its first release for the PlayStation. DreamFactory was founded in November 1995 and consisted of 17 members, all of whom had worked on other 3D polygonal fighting games. The company's chairman and the director of Tobal No. 1, Seiichi Ishii, had himself helped pioneer 3D arcade fighting games as a designer on Virtua Fighter for Sega and the first two Tekken titles for Namco. Toru Ikebuchi was the lead programmer on Tobal No. 1, a role he previously served on Virtua Fighter. Square executive Hironobu Sakaguchi signed on as a supervisor.

The project was conceived by DreamFactory staff as a result of their dissatisfaction with the state of the fighting games and they wished to make their own with the features that they always wanted. Ishii felt that 3D fighting games at the time had not reached the caliber of their 2D counterparts and that additional features like a Quest Mode were needed to evolve the genre. As Tobal No. 1 was designed specifically for the PlayStation rather than arcades, the Quest Mode was planned from the start with the single-player consumer in mind. Motion designer Masahiro Onoguchi said that while it was initially designed as a simple bonus, the Quest Mode grew in scale and complexity as it received more input from staff. Ishii commented that the user's 360-degree control of a character in 3D environments is what best separates Tobal No. 1 from its contemporaries. The interface was set up so that repeatedly pushing the attack buttons could yield visually-appealing combinations for new players. More experienced players could utilize the 3D arenas to perform grapples and throws from the side of or behind an opponent, something that was not seen in previous fighting games. The omission of blood in Tobal No. 1 was intended to increase its appeal in foreign markets while its lack of texture mapping and subsequent use of Gouraud shading yielded superior display resolution, lighting, and frame rates over its competitors.

The characters of Tobal No. 1 were designed by Akira Toriyama, best known for the manga series Dragon Ball and other games such as the Dragon Quest series and Square's own Chrono Trigger. Square's relationship with Toriyama was one in which the two parties had a single, initial meeting to discuss a game project and then the artist would submit his designs to the company sometime later. Prior to DreamFactory opening, Ishii desired to collaborate with Toriyama in order to utilize popular characters such as Trunks from Dragon Ball. The team even proposed a fighting game using the cast of Chrono Trigger, but Toriyama offered to create an original roster instead. He also contributed a basic story and world which were fleshed out by the developer. Toriyama illustrated the fighters so that they could be easily expressed in 3D and gave them body proportions so that their movements appeared natural. They were additionally given distinct physical attributes to account for a variety of situations like smaller characters defeating larger ones and matches against non-human opponents.

The boss Nork was not considered for being playable as his massive size ruined the game's balance, so a small version (Snork) was used instead. The game originally only had two bosses as Mufu was one of the eight initially selectable characters. Gren was created by Toriyama when Ishii requested a rival for Chuji. Once Gren joined the roster, Mufu was made into a boss. Chuji and Gren have the exact same age, height, and weight to reflect their rivalry. Varying degrees of motion capture were used for the character models. Although much of the data was taken from action film actors and martial artists, the robotic animation of Hom was captured directly from motion designer Hitoshi Matsuda. Onoguchi explained that the team preferred the slower, more predictable attack movements of the actors over the martial artists, which were too fast to translate well to the game's mechanics.

Square released Tobal No. 1 in Japan on August 2, 1996. It was the first game made available from the publisher's DigiCube label for Japanese convenience stores. Sony Computer Entertainment picked up the distribution rights for the international release. Due to its stark contrast in graphics to other fighting games and because Toriyama's art style was not yet as well recognized outside Japan, Ishii said that there were plans to alter the game's characters "so it had a different feel and look to it" for the overseas localization. However, that there was no time to make the changes. Tobal No. 1 launched in North America on October 31, 1996 and in Europe on January 10, 1997. All versions of the game were packaged with an extra disc containing a playable demo of Square's PlayStation role-playing video game Final Fantasy VII, a title that was highly anticipated at the time. The disc also had video previews of other upcoming Square releases for the console including Final Fantasy Tactics, Bushido Blade, and SaGa Frontier.

=== Music ===
The music in Tobal No. 1 was composed by eight of Square's composers: Yasunori Mitsuda, Yasuhiro Kawakami, Ryuji Sasai, Masashi Hamauzu, Junya Nakano, Kenji Ito, Noriko Matsueda, and Yoko Shimomura. Music production and synth programming was handled by Mitsuda, while arrangement work was handled by GUIDO (Hidenobu Otsuki and Hiroshi Hata), with a few tracks being composed and arranged by Mitsuda and GUIDO together. The trio closely worked together for a month in a studio creating final arrangements.

Unlike the common themes of techno and rock found in other fighting games, Tobal No. 1 contains a complete mixture of sound, varying instrumental and electronic music, with styles ranging in hip hop, ambient, 1980s groove, jazz, and Latino, attributed to the diversity of the composers' styles. Mitsuda feels that GUIDO's arrangements helped to bring a sense of totality to otherwise disparate songs. The soundtrack was released by DigiCube in Japan on August 21, 1996 and contains 21 tracks found in the game, including one unreleased track. The album was arranged by GUIDO, who later released their own 7-track remix disc, Tobal No. 1 Remixes Electrical Indian.

== Reception ==
Reception

Aggregate score
Aggregator	Score
GameRankings	83%

Review scores
Publication	Score
Electronic Gaming Monthly	8.5/10, 8.5/10, 8.5/10, 8/10
Famitsu	31/40
Game Informer	9/10
Game Players	9/10
GameFan	93/100 (Note: In GameFan's review, three critics scored Tobal No. 1 differently: 98, 94, and 88.)
GameRevolution	B+
GameSpot	7.4/10
Hyper	91%
IGN	8.7/10
Next Generation	4/5
PlayStation Official Magazine – Australia	9/10
Play	94%
Dengeki PlayStation	85/100, 85/100, 80/100, 75/100

Upon release in Japan, Tobal No. 1 topped the Japanese sales charts. Tobal No. 1 became the ninth best-selling home video game of 1996 in Japan, where it sold 752,000 copies that year. The strong sales have been attributed to the inclusion of the Final Fantasy VII demo disc, a highly anticipated title at the time. The game is cited as a cult hit in North America, where it did not sell as well. It sold 99,183 copies in the United States, bringing total sales to 851,183 copies in Japan and the United States.

The game received mostly positive reviews. Famitsu magazine gave a score of 31 out of 40. A Next Generation critic said that it "establishes itself as a major player in an established genre ... with its innovative gameplay and unique graphic approach." He especially praised the control interface, the deep counter system, the unrestricted 3D movement, and the intuitive controls for all of these elements. His one criticism was that the opponent AI is too simplistic to make single-player anywhere near as enjoyable as the multiplayer mode. Bruised Lee of GamePro was less enthusiastic about the controls, saying they take time to master. He concluded the game is outclassed by competition such as Tekken 2 and Virtua Fighter 2, but is still worth trying due to its unique style of animation and quest mode. The four reviewers of Electronic Gaming Monthly also said the controls take getting used to, but highly praised the animation and 3D gameplay. They regarded the battle mode as the highlight but said the quest mode and Final Fantasy VII demo were nice bonuses which add to the game's value-for-money. IGN noted the game's unique graphical representation and free-ranging controls—it ran at 60 frames per second and in 640x480 resolution. GameSpot admired the variety of fighting styles in the game's normal mode, but found the same controls worked sluggishly in the unique Quest Mode. Game Revolution found the blocking system to be confusing but called the game's quest mode the "most innovative feature since—well, bosses."

== Sequel ==
The game's sequel, Tobal 2, was released in 1997 for the PlayStation in Japan. A mobile phone version, titled Tobal M, was released in Japan on December 12, 2007.

== See also ==
- Dissidia Final Fantasy, a later fighting game
- List of Square Enix video game franchises
