= Tobal 2 =

1997 video game

- Developer: DreamFactory
- Publisher: Square
- Director: Seiichi Ishii
- Producer: Shinji Hashimoto
- Designers: Seiichi Ishii; Toru Ikebuchi
- Artist: Akira Toriyama
- Composer: Takayuki Nakamura
- Platform: PlayStation
- Release: JP: April 25, 1997; JP: January 25, 2007; (re-release)
- Genre: Fighting
- Modes: Single-player, multiplayer

Tobal 2 (トバル2, Tobaru 2) is a 1997 fighting video game developed by DreamFactory and released by Square for the PlayStation. It is the sequel to Tobal No. 1. Unlike its predecessor, it was not released outside Japan. The game was re-released in 2007 under Square Enix's "Legendary Hits" label.

As of 2010, the game held the record for the largest character roster in a fighting game with 200 playable characters to choose from, as well as a greatly expanded Quest Mode compared to its predecessor.

== Gameplay ==
The fighting system in Tobal 2 is the same as in the previous game. The player can freely navigate 3D fighting arenas under the condition that they face the opponent. High, medium, and low attacks can be executed using assigned buttons. As in Tobal No. 1, the grappling and blocking system offers the player a variety of offensive and defensive maneuvers. An unblockable fireball attack has been added for each character. Tobal 2 was released on the same day as Sony's Dual Analog Controller in Japan, noted as the first game compatible with the peripheral. Graphically, the game features Gouraud shaded and higher-resolution character models compared to Tobal No. 1, but still runs at 60 frames per second.

The "Quest Mode" from Tobal No. 1 makes a return in Tobal 2. The game contains six dungeons (Practice Dungeon, Pyramid, Desert Spaceship, Molmoran Mine, Castle and Final Dungeon) to conquer. Unlike the dungeon-enclosed Quest Mode of the original, it also offers an explorable town that allows the player to eat, sleep, and shop. In each floor of the dungeons, the player will battle against a variety of monsters. When defeated, the monsters will drop either food, stones, potions, money or weapons. As the player progresses through the game, the character gains experience for each body part or type of attack (the most important being each arm, each leg, throwing and guard). The higher the level of the characters arms and legs and throw, the more damage an attack using that part will yield. Similarly, the higher the guard level, attacks on the character will yield less damage. Both attack and defence levels can be increased/decreased by potions and stones. Guard experience can also be accumulated by eating food when the stamina bar is (nearly) full.

Using a special item, the player can capture monsters in Quest Mode for use in the versus fighting mode, making the number of playable characters a maximum of 200. Some monsters are unique, such as the chocobo, but many of them are palette swaps with attributes raised for higher level monsters. Monsters can be captured by throwing a purple stone at them when they are nearly defeated. The progress of the game can be saved using the church buildings in the town, and the character (consisting of additional data such as max hit points and attack/defence levels) can be used in the arcade and versus mode.

== Development ==
Like the first game, the characters in Tobal 2 were designed by Akira Toriyama.

Tobal 2 was to be released in North America, with a planned launch date of March 7, 1998, but the release was cancelled. It would have been the sixth and last title to be part of Square's publishing deal with Sony Computer Entertainment America; the companies instead opted to release Einhänder. According to a Square official, the game was not localized due to the disappointing sales of Tobal No. 1, and the assumption that most of the people who did buy it only did so for the included playable demo of Final Fantasy VII. Square also stated that because they were working on the translations for Final Fantasy VII and Bushido Blade, they lacked the time and resources to translate a text-heavy game like Tobal 2, and their publishing deal with Sony prohibited them from contracting translations of their games to third-party companies. However, according to a feature in the February 2006 issue of Official U.S. PlayStation Magazine, Square representatives claimed that the game was not released because the PlayStation's limited memory prevented the English dialogue from fitting in the game's text boxes. A fan translation was completed little more than three years prior to Square's official statement. In an January 2011 interview, former Square Enix localization head Richard Mark Honeywood clarified that the game was unable to be reprogrammed to allow English text and that the issue could not be rectified due to the localizer's inability to reprogram the game and the development team's unavailability to fix the code.

The Tobal 2 Original Sound Track was scored by Takayuki Nakamura. Like the soundtrack for the game's predecessor, it includes a fusion of many different styles such as jazz, funk, and rock and roll. Nakamura's music was influenced by Chick Corea, Herbie Hancock and Jeff Beck. The 20 track CD was released by DigiCube on April 21, 1997, in Japan.

According to Ken Kutaragi, when tested with a "performance analyzer" which Sony's engineers had developed to test how much of the PlayStation's potential a piece of software uses, Tobal 2 was shown to use 90%, while every other PlayStation game released up until that point measured at 50% or less.

== Reception ==
Reception

Aggregate score
Aggregator	Score
GameRankings	87%

Review scores
Publication	Score
Famitsu	36 out of 40
GameSpot	8.1 out of 10
Hyper	95 out of 100
Joypad	96/100
Dengeki PlayStation	75/100, 95/100, 90/100, 75/100

Reviewing the game as an import, American video game website GameSpot gave Tobal 2 an 8.1/10, finding it superior to Tobal No. 1, but also said that it has no chance of competing with more popular fighting series such as Tekken and Mortal Kombat.

Tobal 2 sold over 318,000 copies in Japan in 1997, making it the 31st best selling game of the year. In 2000, Tobal 2 was ranked number 50 on Weekly Famitsu's 100 best PlayStation games of all time.
