= Crimson Tears =

2004 video game

- PAL cover depicting the game's three characters. From left to right: Tokio, Asuka, and Kaede.
- Developer: DreamFactory
- Publishers: Capcom; Spike
- Platform: PlayStation 2
- Release: JP: April 22, 2004; NA: July 21, 2004; PAL: November 5, 2004
- Genre: Beat 'em up
- Mode: Single-player

Crimson Tears (Note: Crimson Tears (クリムゾンティアーズ, Kurimuzon Tiāzu)) is a 2004 beat 'em up game developed by DreamFactory and co-published by Capcom and Spike for the PlayStation 2.

== Plot ==
The game is set in Tokyo in the year 2049 and revolves around three characters on the game's front cover, whose home has been destroyed.

== Gameplay ==
The game plays similarly to many dungeon crawlers except that the combat is in real-time. Unlike in most sixth generation games, the levels are completely flat. A notable feature of Crimson Tears is that the levels are generated on the fly using templates, as opposed to a predefined game worlds that are the same every time.

== Reception ==
Reception

Aggregate score
Aggregator	Score
Metacritic	63/100

Review scores
Publication	Score
1Up.com	C−
Electronic Gaming Monthly	6/10
Eurogamer	7/10
Famitsu	29/40
Game Informer	5/10
GamePro	3.5/5
GameRevolution	C−
GameSpot	6.8/10
GameSpy	2/5
GameZone	7.6/10
IGN	7.1/10
Official U.S. PlayStation Magazine	3.5/5

The game received "mixed" reviews according to video game review aggregator platform Metacritic. While critics praised the game's cel-shaded graphics and anime cutscenes, they criticized the game's repetitive nature.
