= Virtua Fighter (video game) =

1993 video game

- North American arcade flyer
- Developer: Sega AM2
- Publisher: Sega
- Director: Yu Suzuki
- Producer: Yu Suzuki
- Designer: Seiichi Ishii
- Programmer: Toru Ikebuchi
- Artist: Seiichi Ishii
- Composer: Takayuki Nakamura
- Series: Virtua Fighter
- Platforms: Arcade, Sega Saturn, 32X, R-Zone, Windows
- Release: October 1993: Arcade; WW: October 1993; JP: December 6, 1993 (Note: Location testing in Japan began in August 1993.) Saturn; JP: November 22, 1994; NA: May 11, 1995; EU: July 8, 1995 Arcade (Remix); JP: April 1995; NA: November 1995; EU: 1995 Saturn (Remix); JP: July 14, 1995; NA: October 2, 1995; EU: October 27, 1995 32X; NA: October 10, 1995; JP: October 20, 1995; EU: November 30, 1995 Windows (Remix); NA: September 10, 1996; EU: 1996
- Genre: Fighting
- Modes: Single-player, multiplayer
- Arcade system: Model 1, ST-V (Remix)

Virtua Fighter (Note: Japanese: バーチャファイター, Hepburn: Bācha Faitā) is a 1993 fighting game developed and published by Sega for arcades. It was developed for the Sega Model 1 arcade platform by AM2, a development group within Sega headed by Yu Suzuki. An early prototype version was location tested in Japan by August 1993, before the complete game was released worldwide in December 1993. It was the first arcade fighting game to feature fully 3D polygon graphics. The game was ported to Sega Saturn as a global launch title in 1994 and 1995, and also received a port to the Sega 32X.

The game was critically acclaimed and a major hit, becoming one of Sega's best-selling arcade games of all time with more than 40,000 arcade units sold while the Saturn versions sold over 1 million copies. Virtua Fighter was highly regarded for its in-depth 3D fighting engine and real-world fighting techniques, and has been revolutionary and highly influential in the evolution of the genre and video games in general. Its success led to the Virtua Fighter series, with its sequel Virtua Fighter 2 released in 1994.

In 1995, an update titled Virtua Fighter Remix was developed and released by AM1, featuring drastic graphical improvements. This improved version was quickly ported to the Saturn console and later received a port to Windows. The game's remake, Virtua Fighter 10th Anniversary, was released for the PlayStation 2 in 2003 as a standalone title in Japan and as a bonus in Virtua Fighter 4: Evolution in North America.

== Gameplay ==
Lau Chan vs. Jacky Bryant (arcade)

The Virtua label indicates that the onscreen action takes place in a 3D environment; however, movement is restricted to 2D. The graphics were made using wireframe and flat-shaded quad polygons. The game retains the fighting game staple of having multiple characters, each with their own distinctive moves.

In the game's single-player mode, the player faces all eight characters (including a duplicate of the chosen character) in a pre-determined order, followed by a fight with the game's boss, Dural. Each fight is a best-of-three match, and the player has three ways of winning: knocking out the opponent, forcing them out of the ring, or having more health left when time runs out.

Unlike other fighting games of the early 1990s (such as Street Fighter II or Mortal Kombat), the game relies on a control stick and only three buttons, punch, kick and guard (block), although different situations and button combinations led to a vast variety of moves for each character.

== Plot ==
=== Characters ===
- Akira Yuki—An assistant kung fu teacher from Japan, fights with Bajiquan.
- Pai Chan—A martial arts film star from Hong Kong, fights with Mizongquan.
- Lau Chan—Pai's father and a cook from China, fights with a fictional fighting style Hǔ Yàn Quán (虎燕拳, Koen-ken; "Tiger Swallow Fist").
- Wolf Hawkfield—A professional wrestler from Canada, fights with professional wrestling maneuvers.
- Jeffry McWild—A fisherman from Australia, fights with Pancratium.
- Kage-Maru ("Kage")—A ninja from Japan, fights with Jujutsu.
- Sarah Bryant—A college student from San Francisco, CA who had been abducted and brainwashed by a criminal organization, fights with Jeet Kune Do (Sega changed her fighting style to "martial arts", which also includes Tae Kwon Do, Savate and Karate as of Virtua Fighter 4: Evolution).
- Jacky Bryant—Sarah's older brother and a race car driver also from San Francisco, fights with Jeet Kune Do.
- Dural—A gynoid that is the game's final boss and is Kage's missing mother, Tsukikage. She fights with a mix of all the other fighters' styles.

An Arab fighter named Majido "Siba" Abdul was planned, and his character model appeared on some Virtua Fighter arcade cabinets (though, in some cases, Akira's name was placed under his portrait). Siba was originally to be the protagonist of the franchise. He was ultimately dropped, but later appeared in Fighters Megamix. Two other characters were also discovered. One was an early design of Akira Yuki, under an early name Takeru Ryushoji, who was shirtless and wore pants and shoes. The other was a military man named Jeffery "Jeff" Buckman. Other fighters in the game that were planned to appear were the Koskol brothers Rekka (the eldest) Score (the middle) and Aeon (the youngest), these 6 fighters were part of an organization known as the "Red Scorpions", but was later scrapped.

=== Story ===
Once in the Shōwa period, the defunct Japanese army intended to approach Puyi, the last Emperor of the Qing Dynasty in their effort to take advantages. However, they were defeated by the Imperial guards who used the martial art called Hakkyoku-ken. During World War II, the Japanese army research the mysteries of Hakkyoku-ken to create supersoldiers, developing the ultimate martial art.

Half a century has passed since these events - at the time the game is set, the 'ultimate World Fighting Tournament' is about to start, featuring fighters from around the world. Behind the Tournament, however, there exists an intrigue designed by a sinister syndicate.

== Development and release ==
=== Virtua Fighter ===
The game's development began in 1992, following the development of Virtua Racing. Virtua Fighter was developed to run on Sega Model 1 arcade hardware, developed internally at Sega. According to Sega of Japan's publicity manager, Kurokawa, "We deliberately didn't publicize all the [fighting] moves at the same time but instead revealed them to gamers one at a time by means of the Japanese videogame press." Virtua Fighter also used 3D motion capture technology. Before Virtua Fighter, Sega AM3 simulated 3D using a creative method of sprite scaling on the 1993 arcade fighting game Dark Edge.

According to Suzuki, an issue during the game's development was performing fast division calculations for 3D operations. The only applications he was aware of performing fast enough divisions at the time were nuclear reactors and space rockets. The team "were working away with craftsmanship equivalent to inscribing 100 words on a single grain of rice" to achieve fast 3D division operations, according to Suzuki.

An early prototype version of the arcade game featured an Arab fighter called Siba. This early version did not have Akira Yuki, who was added later in development as a replacement for Siba, with Akira becoming the game's protagonist. This early prototype version was location tested in Japan and then demonstrated at the Amusement Machine Show (AM Show) in August 1993. The game then made its North American debut at the AMOA show in October 1993.

Virtua Fighter was a launch game for the Sega Saturn, and served as the pack-in launch game in North America. Its Sega 32X version was developed by the same team responsible for the Genesis port of Virtua Racing.

=== Virtua Fighter Remix ===
Virtua Fighter Remix was an update of the original Virtua Fighter with higher-polygon models, texture mapping, and some gameplay changes. It was given free to all registered Saturn owners in the United States via mail. It had an arcade release on the ST-V (an arcade platform based on the Sega Saturn) and later ported to Microsoft Windows as Virtua Fighter PC. In Japan, Game Machine listed it on their August 1, 1995, issue as being the twenty-first most-successful arcade game of the month.

=== Virtua Fighter 10th Anniversary ===
With the 2003 PlayStation 2 release of Virtua Fighter 4: Evolution arriving in time for the series' tenth anniversary, a remake of Virtua Fighter, Virtua Fighter 10th Anniversary, was released on the PlayStation 2. While the music, stages and low-polygon visual style were retained from the first game, the character roster, animations, mechanics and movesets were taken from Evolution. In the previous PS2 release of Virtua Fighter 4, a button code would make the player's character look like a Virtua Fighter model. In Japan, the game was included as part of a box set with a book called Virtua Fighter 10th Anniversary: Memory of a Decade and a DVD. The box set was released in November 2003 and was published by Enterbrain. In North America, the game was included in the home version of Virtua Fighter 4: Evolution, and in Europe it was only available as a promotional item; it was not sold at retail.

== Reception ==
Reception
Review scores
Publication	Scores		
Publication	Arcade	Sega Saturn	32X
Computer and Video Games	83%	94%	95%
Edge	Positive	9/10	
Electronic Gaming Monthly	Positive	8/10, 8.5/10, 8/10, 7/10	29/40
Famitsu		9/10, 9/10, 9/10, 9/10	7/10, 8/10, 8/10, 7/10
Game Informer		8/10	
GamesMaster		96%	
Hyper		90%	
Maximum		5/5	
Mean Machines Sega		96%	
Mega		97%	
Next Generation	3/5 (Remix)	4/5 (original); 5/5 (Remix)	4/5
Sega Magazin		87% (original); 91% (Remix)	
Sega Power		97%	
Sega Saturn Magazine		5/5 (Remix)	
Sega Saturn Tsūshin		38/40	
Ultimate Future Games		96%	
Awards
Publication(s)	Awards		
Gamest Awards (1994)	3rd Best Game of the Year, 3rd Best Fighting Game, 6th Best Graphics		
AMOA Awards (1994)	Most Played Videogame (nominee), Most Innovative New Technology (nominee)		
EGM, 1UP, Famitsu, Computer Gaming World	Best Games of All Time		
GameSpot, 1UP	Most Influential Games of All Time		

=== Arcade ===
Sega began location testing an early prototype version in Japan prior to the game's demonstration at the Amusement Machine Show (AM Show) in August 1993. Sega reported it to be their highest-earning location test performance of all time, with each test machine earning a daily average of ¥60,000 or $600 (equivalent to $1,337 in 2025). At the 1993 AM Show, it was rated the "hit of the show" by many visitors.

Upon the game's release in Japan, Game Machine listed Virtua Fighter as the country's most popular upright/cockpit arcade game of December 1993. It went on to become Japan's highest-grossing arcade game of 1994, and one of the country's highest-grossing arcade games of all time. According to Next Generation magazine in 1995, Virtua Fighter was "the biggest game in Japan since Super Mario World." In North America, RePlay reported Virtua Fighter to be the sixth most popular upright arcade game of February 1994; it went on to be one of America's top five highest-grossing arcade games of 1994. In the United Kingdom, it was the second top-grossing arcade game in London during early 1994 (below Ridge Racer), and went on to be one of the most popular coin-ops of the year. In South Korea, Virtua Fighter ranked second in the reader-popularity chart published by GameChamp in July 1994, rising to first place in August. The magazine subsequently ranked it first among action games in its retrospective chart of 1994.

Virtua Fighter sold more than 40,000 arcade units worldwide by 1996, with each unit costing between $15,000 (equivalent to $33,000 in 2025) and £14,000 / $21,000 (equivalent to $47,000 in 2025). Virtua Fighter and Virtua Fighter 2 (1994) became Sega's best-selling arcade games of all time, surpassing their previous record holder Out Run (1986).

Following its demonstration at the 1993 AM Show, Virtua Fighter received a positive industry reception. RePlay magazine called "the adaptation of 3-D polygon graphics to video fighting games" a "sensational development that could define and revitalize this already-hot category." California Games CEO Pat Schroeder said Virtua Fighter "was by far the dawn of a new era of games" with praise for the "computerized 3-D graphics with effects that are unreal" and how it "shows the fighting action" from different angles. Edge magazine called Virtua Fighter "a tantalising glimpse into the future of fighting games employing the same ground-breaking CG computer graphics system as Virtua Racing." While criticizing the appearance of the "excessively blocky polygonised people," Edge said "the 3D scrolling, animation and movement are all silky-smooth and very realistic" and that "the fluid animation and imaginative camera angles quickly won the audience over." Electronic Gaming Monthly hailed Virtua Fighter as a demonstration of "just how far video games have come in the last eight years." EGM made particular note of the advanced graphics, how the camera moves along different axes depending on the fighters' location, the use of multiple viewpoints in the instant replay, the high quality of the gameplay, and the smoothness and realism of the animation. The game received similar praise following its 1993 AMOA Show debut.

In January 1994, Rik Skews of Computer and Video Games magazine, after playing for 1 hour, initially praised the "brilliant 64-bit" 3D graphics, animation and camera work but compared the gameplay unfavorably to Street Fighter II. Computer and Video Games was later more positive towards the gameplay, stating in December 1994 that the game "combined cutting edge arcade technology with motion capture techniques and some excellent gameplay design." Next Generation said in 1995 that it epitomized Yu Suzuki's "skill of finding the perfect blend of state-of-the-art technology with solid gameplay" in "the cut-throat world" of arcades.

=== Ports ===
The console port of Virtua Fighter, which was very close to the arcade game, sold at a nearly 1:1 ratio with the Saturn hardware during the Japanese launch. The Future Publishing magazine Ultimate Future Games called Virtua Fighter the "game that killed" the 16-bit machines. The Saturn version sold 630,000 units in Japan, while Remix sold a further 437,036 units there in 1995, for a combined total of 1,067,036 units sold for the Saturn in Japan. In Germany, Virtua Fighter topped retailer Karstadt's Saturn software sales chart in July 1995, the console's launch month in the country. In Spain, Virtua Fighter Remix topped the first Sega Saturn popularity ranking published by Hobby Consolas in December 1995, ahead of Virtua Cop, Daytona USA, Panzer Dragoon and Rayman.

On release of the Saturn version, Sega Saturn Tsūshin scored the game a 38 out of 40. Famicom Tsūshin's four critics would each score the same version a nine out of ten rating in December 1994. Computer and Video Games reviewed a Japanese import in December 1994, stating "the last machine to generate so much interest in this office was the arrival of" the Super Famicom with Super Mario World. Steve James praised the "superlative" moves, "amazingly crisp" sound samples, and "totally realistic" action; Mark Patterson, while criticizing the high UK import price of £70–80 ($107–122), concluded with "credit to Sega for producing an excellent machine, and even more to AM2 for its near-perfect conversion of this fantastic game." In a review of the Japanese release, GamePro praised the retention of the fighters, moves, varying camera angles, and controls of the arcade version, as well as the improved voice and sound effects and home version options, and concluded it to be "one of the best games ever bundled with a system". Their later review of the North American release was similarly laudatory, but remarked that Tekken and Battle Arena Toshinden for the soon-to-launch PlayStation were even better. Next Generation, which also reviewed the game prior to the Saturn's USA launch, disagreed, contending that "What Virtua Fighter lacks in [Battle Arena] Tohshinden's immediate graphical punch, it makes up for in grinding longevity." They particularly praised the game's depth and realism, and summarized that "The Saturn Virtua Fighter is, to all intents and purposes, the coin-op game brought home. And away from the arcade, under the harsh light of unhurried examination, its merits grow."

Maximum gave it five out of five stars, calling it "a stunningly close conversion that is quite possibly the best game available for the machine." They remarked that the innovations such as the 3D motion capture remained impressive, as well as the depth and variety of the character's gameplay application: "every fighter has almost limitless scope for coming up with all-new attacks." They also praised the "very clever mixture of superbly exaggerated sound effects coupled with a tangible, realistic impact for every blow." Electronic Gaming Monthly were more subdued in their reaction, but two of their four reviewers commented that it was nearly identical to the arcade version. Edge rated the Saturn version 9/10, stating: "Saturn Virtua Fighter has all the pulling power of the arcade version, including the swooping, gliding game camera, the stylish polygon characters, the totally convincing animation and the compulsive gameplay ... [The graphics] were impressive enough in the original, but on the Saturn, under the kind of intense scrutiny you can never give a game in the arcades, they emerge as simply astounding ... It's arguably the first true 'next generation' console game, fusing the best aspects of combat gameplay with groundbreaking animation and gorgeous sound".

Sega Saturn Magazine gave Virtua Fighter Remix five out of five stars, saying that it fixed the glitches and graphics of the original game while maintaining the already excellent gameplay. Electronic Gaming Monthly scored Remix 29 out of 40 (average 7.25 out of 10). The reviewers praised all the game's improvements, but most of them concluded that it was still not worth buying for players who already owned the original game. Maximum likewise praised the quality of the game and its low price tag, but felt it was not worth buying, with the release of the even better Saturn conversion of Virtua Fighter 2 less than a month away. They scored it four out of five stars. The staff of Next Generation gave it five out of five stars, applauding the graphical improvements and glitch fixes. They commented: "Perhaps never in videogame history has a problem such as Virtua Fighter been so quickly and thoroughly corrected. Virtua Fighter Remix contains all the great gameplay of the original without any of the weak spots." Scary Larry of GamePro gave the game a highly positive review for its graphical enhancements and retention of all the excellent gameplay of the original Saturn version. GamePro also ran two reader-submitted reviews for the game; King Kane argued that the graphical and audio improvements make the game worth trying even for those who are not fans of Virtua Fighter, while Tricky Ricky argued that though the game is an impressive upgrade, the lack of changes to the gameplay make its appeal quickly fade. Famicom Tsūshin scored Virtua Fighter Remix a 35 out of 40, and the Sega 32X version of the game a 30 out of 40. Next Generation reviewed the arcade version of the game, and stated that "The drawback of all Titan games, including Remix, is that the technology isn't as advanced, fast, or powerful as Model 2B [...] and these games are really like playing fast Saturn games in the arcade."

Electronic Gaming Monthly scored the 32X version 30.5 out of 40 (average 7.625 out of 10), calling it an excellent conversion given the system it's on, but dated next to the graphically superior Saturn version and especially Virtua Fighter Remix, both of which had already been released. GamePro also noted that the 32X version suffers from more slowdown and fewer polygons than the Saturn version, as well as "tinny sound quality", but praised the additional options not included in the Saturn version and rated it as an overall strong port. A critic for Next Generation similarly said that the 32X version is not as impressive looking as the Saturn version but has more options and fewer glitches, making it an overall excellent port. He argued that the game was not worth buying a 32X for, since the system was not powerful enough to handle ports of Virtua Fighter Remix or Virtua Fighter 2 (which was soon to be released for the Saturn), but that it was an essential purchase for those who already own a 32X. In Spain, Sega regarded Virtua Fighter as an important title for the 32X. In a 1995 interview, Sega Spain general director José Ángel Sánchez described the game as "one of the keys" to the add-on's future, noting that Sega hoped the 32X could upgrade an installed base of approximately 600,000 Mega Drive owners in the country to 32-bit hardware.

In 1995, Flux rated the arcade version 16th in its Top 100 Video Games. At the time, they called Virtua Fighter: "The most satisfying fighter in existence." In 1996, Computer Gaming World declared Virtua Fighter PC the 121st-best computer game ever released. In 1996, GamesMaster ranked Virtua Fighter eighth on their "The GamesMaster Saturn Top 10."

== Legacy and impact ==
Virtua Fighter dispensed with sprite-based graphics, replacing them with flat-shaded polygons rendered in real-time, by the Model 1's 3D-rendering hardware, allowing for effects and technologies that were impossible in sprite-based fighters, such as characters that could move in three dimensions, and a dynamic camera that could zoom, pan and swoop dramatically around the arena. It has been credited with both introducing and popularizing the use of polygon-based 3D graphics in fighting games. Next Generation said in 1995 that Virtua Fighter was "arguably the most significant game" of the 1990s. 1UP listed it as one of the 50 most important games of all time. They credited Virtua Fighter for creating the 3D fighting game genre, and more generally, demonstrating the potential of 3D polygon human characters (as the first to implement them in a useful way), showing the potential of realistic gameplay (introducing a character physics system and realistic character animations), and introducing fighting game concepts such as the ring-out and the block button.

At a time when fighting games were becoming increasingly focused on violence and shock value, the popularity of Virtua Fighter demonstrated that fighting games focused on gameplay were still commercially viable. Nintendo's Shigeru Miyamoto said that for several years after Virtua Fighter was released he was disinterested in making fighting games because he felt that "I was beaten to the punch when Virtua Fighter came out", and that any fighting game he produced would have been perceived as an attempt to copy Virtua Fighter. Game designer Yasuyuki Oda remarked that he was impressed by this video game while working for SNK. In particular, Virtua Fighter garnered praise for its simple three-button control scheme, with the game's strategy coming from the intuitively observed differences between characters that felt and acted differently rather than the more ornate combos of two-dimensional competitors. Virtua Fighter's fluid animation and relatively realistic depiction of distinct fighting styles gave its combatants a lifelike presence considered impossible to replicate with sprites.

Virtua Fighter played a crucial role in popularizing 3D polygonal graphics. Some of the Sony Computer Entertainment (SCE) staff involved in the creation of the original PlayStation video game console credit Virtua Fighter as inspiration for the PlayStation's 3D graphics hardware. According to SCE's former producer Ryoji Akagawa and chairman Shigeo Maruyama, the PlayStation was originally being considered as a 2D focused hardware, and it was not until the success of Virtua Fighter in the arcades that they decided to design the PlayStation as a 3D focused hardware. Toby Gard also cited Virtua Fighter as an influence on the use of polygon characters—and the creation of Lara Croft—in Tomb Raider: "It became clear to me watching people play Virtua Fighter, which was kind of the first big 3D-character console game, that even though there were only two female characters in the lineup, in almost every game I saw being played, someone was picking one of the two females." John Romero also cited Virtua Fighter as a major influence on the creation of 3D first-person shooter Quake. Team Ico's Fumito Ueda also cited Virtua Fighter as an influence on his animation work.

== See also ==
- Fighting Vipers, a 3D fighting game series also by Sega
