= Fighting game =

Video game genre

Screencap of a match in Mortal Kombat 3. Colored bars above represent fighters' health.

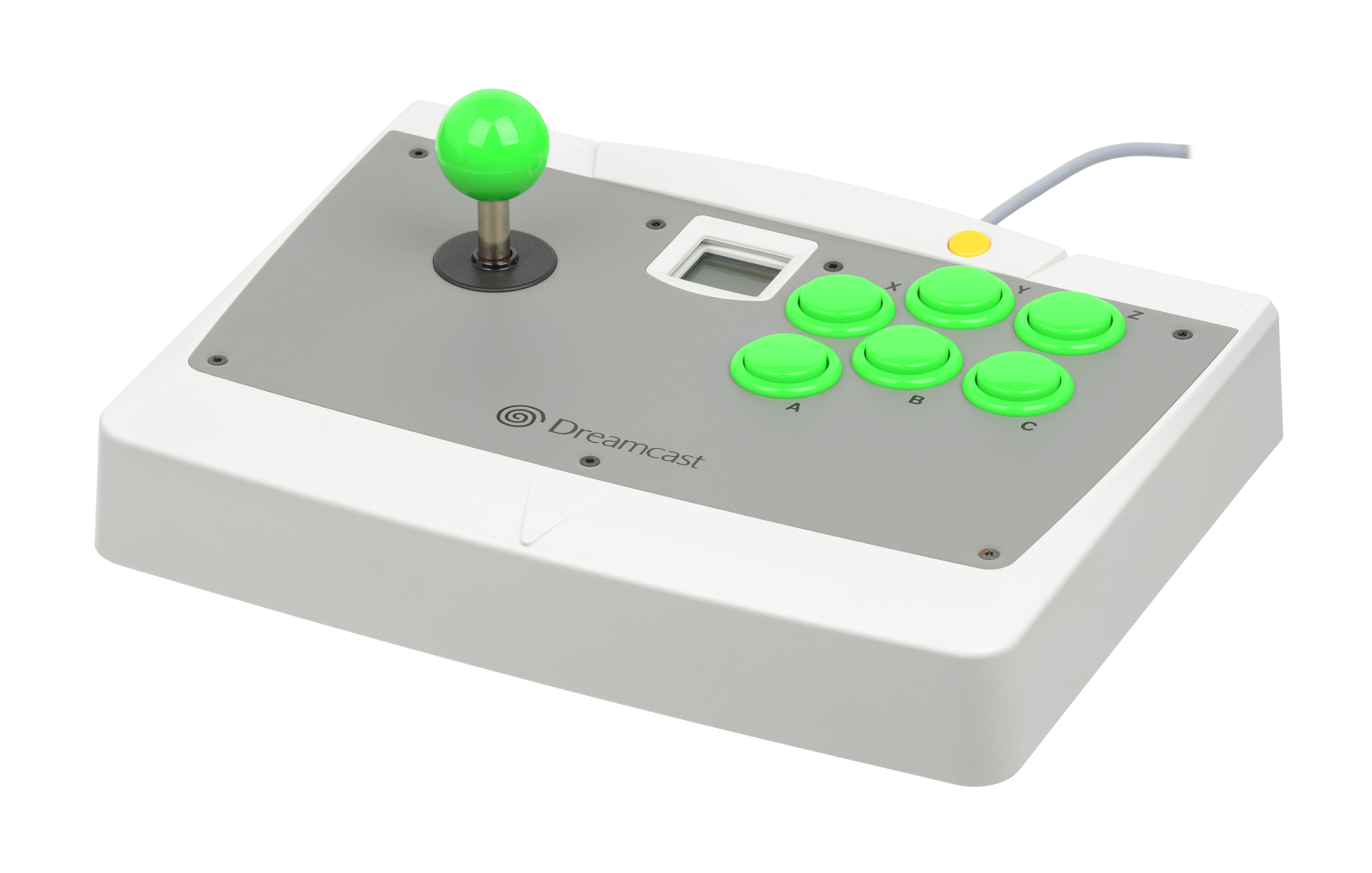
An official controller for the Sega Dreamcast, used for Fighting Games

The fighting game genre involves combat between characters, often (but not necessarily limited to) one-on-one battles. The mechanics of combat in fighting games often features blocking, grappling, counter-attacking, and the ability to chain attacks together into "combos". Characters generally engage in hand-to-hand combat, often incorporating martial arts, but some may include weaponry. Battles are usually set in a fixed-size arena along a two-dimensional plane, where characters navigate horizontally by walking or dashing, and vertically by jumping. Some games allow limited movement in 3D space, such as Tekken, Soul Edge and Dead or Alive, while some are set in fully three-dimensional environments without restricting characters' movement, such as Dragon Ball Z: Budokai Tenkaichi, Jump Force, Kill la Kill: If, My Hero: One's Justice, Naruto: Ultimate Ninja Storm, One Piece: Burning Blood and Power Stone; these are sometimes referred to as "3D arena" fighting games.

The fighting game genre is distinctly related to the beat 'em up genre, which pits many computer-controlled enemies against one or more player characters. The first video game to feature fist fighting is Heavyweight Champ (1976), but Karate Champ (1984) actually features the one-on-one fighting game genre instead of a sports game in arcades. Yie Ar Kung-Fu was released later that year with various fighting styles and introduced health meters, and The Way of the Exploding Fist (1985) further popularized the genre on home systems. In 1987, Capcom's Street Fighter introduced special attacks, and in 1991, its highly successful sequel Street Fighter II refined and popularized many genre conventions, including combos. Fighting games subsequently became the preeminent genre for video gaming in the early to mid-1990s, particularly in arcades. This period spawned dozens of other popular fighting games, including franchises like Street Fighter, Mortal Kombat, Tekken and Super Smash Bros.

== Definition ==
Fighting games are a type of action game where two (in one-on-one fighting games) or more (in platform fighters) on-screen characters fight each other. These games typically feature special moves that are triggered using rapid sequences of carefully timed button presses and joystick movements. Games traditionally show fighters from a side view, even as the genre has progressed from two-dimensional (2D) to three-dimensional (3D) graphics. Street Fighter II, though not the first fighting game, is considered to have standardized the genre, and similar games released prior to Street Fighter II have since been more explicitly classified as fighting games. Fighting games typically involve hand-to-hand combat, though many games also feature characters with melee weapons. Fighting characters are usually based on humans, but there are also games that are entirely based around mecha robot characters, for example the Gundam: Battle Assault series.

This genre is distinctly related to beat 'em ups, another action genre involving combat, where the player character must fight many enemies at the same time. Beat 'em ups, like traditional fighting games, display player and enemy health in a bar, generally located at the top of the screen. However, beat 'em ups generally do not feature combat divided into separate "rounds". During the 1980s to 1990s, publications used the terms "fighting game" and "beat 'em up" interchangeably, along with other terms such as "martial arts simulation" (or more specific terms such as "judo simulator") and "punch-kick" games. Fighting games were still being called "beat 'em up" games in video game magazines up until the end of the 1990s. With hindsight, critics have argued that the two types of game gradually became dichotomous as they evolved, though the two terms may still be conflated.

Sports-based combat games are games that feature boxing, mixed martial arts (MMA), or wrestling. Serious boxing games belong more to the sports game genre than the action game genre, as they aim for a more realistic model of boxing techniques, whereas moves in fighting games tend to be either highly exaggerated or outright fantastical models of Asian martial arts techniques. As such, boxing games, mixed martial arts games, and wrestling games are often described as distinct genres, without comparison to fighting games, and belong more in the sports game genre.

== Game design ==
Although Street Fighter II is not the first fighting game, it popularized and established the gameplay conventions of the genre.

Fighting games involve combat between pairs of fighters using highly exaggerated martial arts moves. They typically revolve primarily around brawling or combat sport, though some variations feature weaponry. Games usually display on-screen fighters from a side view, and even 3D fighting games play largely within a 2D plane of motion. Games usually confine characters to moving left and right and jumping, although some games such as Fatal Fury: King of Fighters allow players to move between parallel planes of movement. Recent games tend to be rendered in three dimensions, making it easier for developers to add a greater number of animations, but otherwise play like those rendered in two dimensions. Games that are fully three-dimensional without a 2D plane are sometimes referred to as "3D arena" fighting games.

=== Features ===
Aside from restricting movement space, fighting games confine the player's actions to offensive and defensive maneuvers. Players must learn each game's effective combinations of attacks and defenses. Blocking is a basic defense against basic attacks. Some games feature more advanced blocking techniques; for example, Capcom's Street Fighter III features a move termed "parrying", which can be immediately followed by counter-attack, skipping the temporary stun a block would have put them in. A similar stun state is termed "just defended" in SNK's Garou: Mark of the Wolves.

==== Special attacks and combos ====
An integral feature of fighting games is the use of "special attacks", also called "secret moves", that employ combinations of directional inputs and button presses to perform a particular move beyond basic punching and kicking. Some special moves, which play an animation portraying an aspect of the character's personality, are referred to as taunts. Originated by Japanese company SNK in Art of Fighting (1992), these add humor, and they affect gameplay in certain games, such as improving the strength of other attacks. Some characters have unusual taunts, like Dan Hibiki from Street Fighter Alpha.

Combos that chain several attacks are fundamental to the genre since Street Fighter II (1991). Most fighting games display a "combo meter" of progress through a combo. The effectiveness of such moves often relates to the difficulty of execution and the degree of risk. These moves are often challenging, requiring excellent memory and timing.

==== Counterplay ====
Predicting opponents' moves and counter-attacking, known as "countering", is a common element of gameplay. Fighting games emphasize the height of blows, ranging from low to jumping attacks. Thus, strategy requires predicting adversarial moves, similar to rock–paper–scissors.

In addition to blows, players can utilize throwing or grappling to circumvent blocks. Most fighting games allow a grapple move by pressing two or more buttons together, or simply by pressing punch or kick while being directly adjacent to the opponent. Other fighting games, like Dead or Alive, have a unique button for throws and takedowns.

Projectiles are primarily in 2D fighting games, like the Hadouken in Street Fighter. Projectiles can simply inflict damage, or can maneuver opponents into disadvantageous positions.

=== Emergent gameplay elements ===
==== Turtling and zoning ====
Especially in 2D, zoning is defensive play that focuses on using relatively risk-free attacks to keep the opposing player away. The object is to force an opponent to take significant risks to approach the zoning player's character, or to stall out the in-game timer, which causes the player with more health (typically the one doing the zoning) to win. The effectiveness of the latter strategy varies from game to game, based on the effectiveness of zoning tools as well as the length of the in-game timer and the rewards characters can receive for successfully landing a hit when countering zoning.

==== Rushdown ====
The opposite of turtling, rushdown refers to a number of specific aggressive strategies, philosophies, and play styles across all fighting games. The general goal of a rushdown play style is to overwhelm the opponent and force costly mistakes, either by using fast, confusing setups or by taking advantage of an impatient opponent as they are forced to play defense for prolonged periods of time. Rushdown players often favor attacking opponents in the corner of a stage or as they get up from a knockdown; both situations severely limit the options of the opponent and often allow the attacking player to force high-risk guessing scenarios.

==== Spacing and footsies ====
Spacing is the act of positioning a character at a range where their attacks and movement tools carry the lowest risk and the highest reward. The concept is somewhat akin to that of footwork in martial arts. The desired position for play varies based on what tools are available to the character each player is currently using. As a result of this, a concept called "footsies" has emerged, frequently defined as players jockeying for position and using low-commitment moves at distances where neither character has a particular advantage.

==== Pressure ====
Depending on the game, character, and move used, a player may be rewarded for a decisive blow with a strong positional advantage, strong enough that the rewarded player can minimize the number of viable moves available to the other player. Doing so, and then taking advantage of the opponent's limited options, is called pressure. Common forms of pressure include making a player guess whether they should block high or low, or keeping the opposing player trapped in the corner and punishing any attempts to escape.

=== Matches and rounds ===
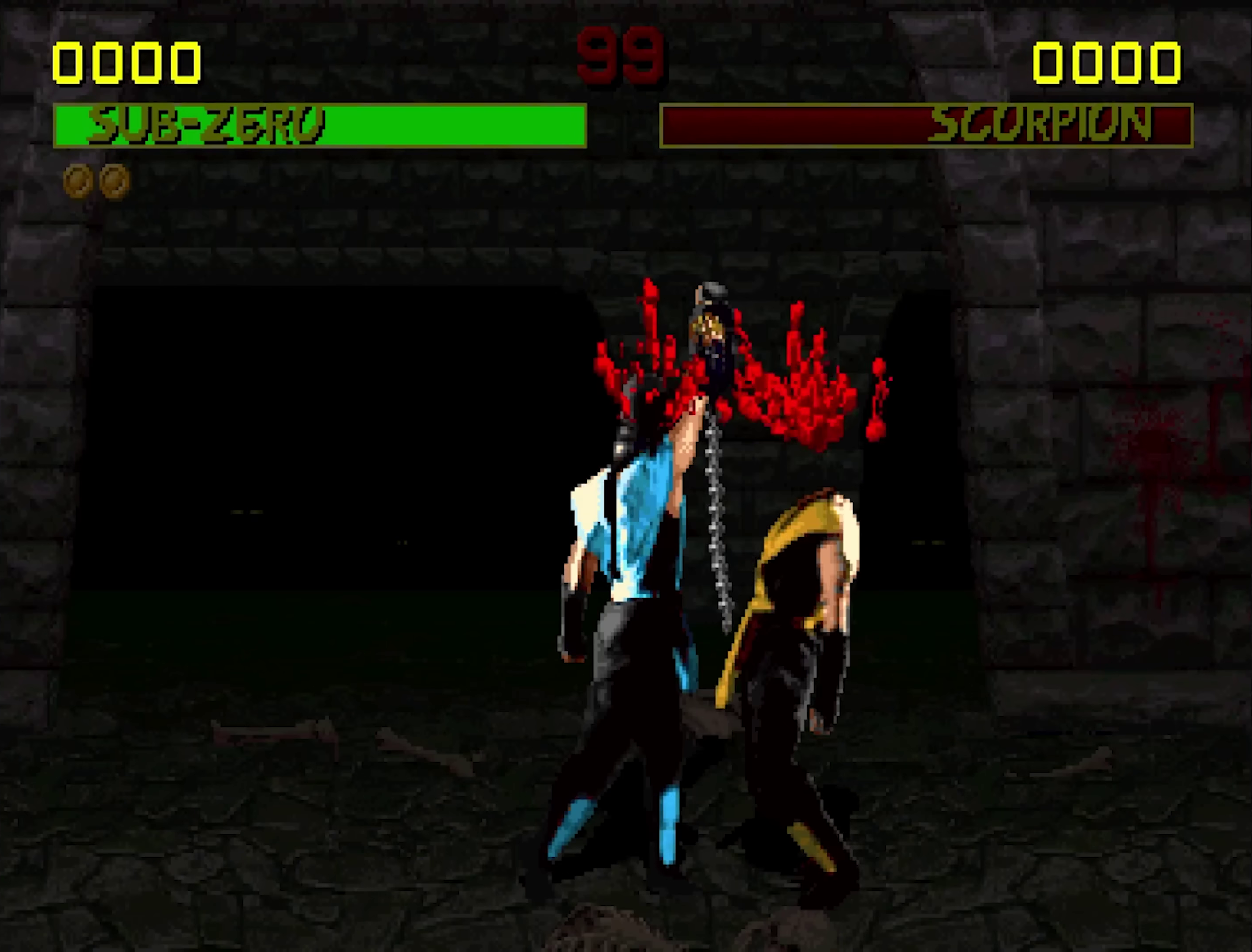
Mortal Kombat allows the victor to perform a gruesome finishing maneuver called a "Fatality".

Fighting game matches generally consist of a set number of rounds (typically three), beginning with the announcer's signal. If the score is tied after an even number of rounds (typically 1-1), then the winner is decided in the final round. Round decisions can also be determined by time over, which judge players based on remaining health to declare a winner. In the Super Smash Bros. series, the rules are different. Instead of rounds, the games usually give players a set number of lives (called stocks) for each player (usually three), and if the score is tied between two or more fighters when time runs out, then a "sudden death" match will take place by delivering a single hit to an opponent with 300% damage.

Fighting games widely feature health bars, introduced in Yie Ar Kung-Fu in 1984, which are depleted as characters sustain blows. Each successful attack will deplete a character's health, and the round continues until a fighter's health reaches zero. Hence, the main goal is to completely deplete the health bar of one's opponent, thus achieving a "knockout". Games such as Virtua Fighter also allow a character to be defeated by forcing them outside of the arena, awarding a "ring-out" to the winner. The Super Smash Bros. series allows players to send fighters off the stage when a character reaches a high percentage of damage; however, the gameplay objective differs from that of traditional fighting games in that the aim is to increase damage counters and knock opponents off the stage instead of depleting life bars.

Beginning with Midway's Mortal Kombat released in 1992, the Mortal Kombat series introduced "Fatalities", where the match victor inflicts a brutal and gruesome finishing move onto the defeated opponent. Prompted by the announcer saying "Finish Him!", players have a short time window to execute a Fatality by entering a specific button and joystick combination while positioned at a specific distance from the opponent. The Fatality and its derivations are arguably the most notable features of the Mortal Kombat series with cultural impact and controversies.

Fighting games often include a single-player campaign or tournament, where the player must defeat a sequence of several computer-controlled opponents. Winning the tournament often reveals a special story-ending cutscene, and some games also grant access to hidden characters or special features upon victory. Tekken introduced the concept of story modes in 1994 with the first arcade full motion video cutscenes for each character's victory.

=== Character selection ===
In most fighting games, players may select from a variety of playable characters with unique fighting styles, special moves, and personalities. This became a strong convention for the genre with the release of Street Fighter II (1991), and these character choices have led to deeper game strategy and replay value.

Custom character creation, or "create–a–fighter", is a feature of some fighting games that allows a player to customize the appearance and move set of their own character. Super Fire Pro Wrestling X Premium was the first game to include such a feature.

=== Multiplayer modes ===
Fighting games can support a two-player duel, sometimes by letting a second player challenge the first at any moment during a single-player match. Some games allow four-player simultaneous competition. Uniquely, the Super Smash Bros. series has allowed eight-player local multiplayer matches, beginning with Super Smash Bros. for Wii U, though many classify the series as the platform fighter subgenre due to its deviation from traditional fighting game rules and design. Several games such as Marvel vs. Capcom and Dead or Alive have featured teams where players form "tag teams" to fight duels, but a character may be swapped by a teammate. Some fighting games offer the endurance challenge of a series of opponents. Online games can suffer lag from slow data transmission, which can disrupt split-second timing. This is mitigated by technology such as rollback netcode, often implemented using the open-source library GGPO, which synchronizes players by quickly rolling back to the most recent accurate game state, correcting errors, and then jumping back to the current frame. Such games include Skullgirls and Street Fighter III: 3rd Strike Online Edition.

== History ==
=== Origins (1970s to early 1980s) ===
The first fighting games were fundamentally inspired by martial arts films, especially Bruce Lee's Hong Kong action cinema. Films include Game of Death (1972), where Lee fights a series of bosses, and Enter the Dragon (1973), about an international martial arts tournament. Other inspirations were Japanese martial arts works, including the manga and anime series Karate Master (1971–1977) and Sonny Chiba's The Street Fighter (1974).

Before martial arts games, featuring battles between characters with fantastical abilities and complex special maneuvers, the earliest video games with fist-fighting are boxing games. Sega's black-and-white boxing game Heavyweight Champ, released for arcades in 1976, is considered the first video game with fist fighting, but it was still considered a sports game. Vectorbeam's arcade video game Warrior (1979) is sometimes credited as one of the first fighting games; in contrast to Heavyweight Champ and most later games, Warrior is based on sword fighting duels and uses a bird's-eye view. Sega's jidaigeki-themed arcade action game Samurai, released in March 1980, features a boss battle where the samurai player character confronts a boss samurai in one-on-one sword-fighting combat.

One-on-one boxing games appeared on consoles with Activision's Atari VCS game Boxing, released in July 1980, and Sega's SG-1000 game Champion Boxing (1983), which is Yu Suzuki's debut at Sega. Nintendo's arcade game Punch-Out was developed in 1983 and released in February 1984, as a boxing game featuring a behind-the-character perspective, maneuvers such as blocking and dodging, and stamina meters that are depleted or replenished by blows.

=== Emergence of fighting game genre (mid-to-late 1980s) ===
Karate Champ was developed by Technōs Japan and released by Data East in May 1984, and is credited with establishing and popularizing the one-on-one fighting game genre. A variety of moves can be performed using the dual-joystick controls. It uses a best-of-three matches format like later fighting games, and has training bonus stages. The Player vs Player edition of Karate Champ, released later that year, is also the first fighting game to allow two-player duel. It influenced Konami's Yie Ar Kung Fu, released in October 1984. The game drew heavily from Bruce Lee films, with the main player character Oolong modelled after Lee (like in Bruceploitation films). In contrast to the grounded realism of Karate Champ, Yie Ar Kung-Fu moved the genre towards more fantastical, fast-paced action with a variety of special moves and high jumps, establishing the template for subsequent fighting games. It expanded on Karate Champ by pitting the player against a variety of opponents, each with a unique appearance and fighting style. The player could also perform up to sixteen different moves, including projectile attacks, and it replaced the point-scoring system of Karate Champ with a health meter system, becoming the standard for the genre.

Irem's Kung-Fu Master, designed by Takashi Nishiyama and released in November 1984, is a side-scrolling beat 'em up that, at the end of each level, featured one-on-one boss battles that resemble fighting games. It is based on Hong Kong martial arts films, specifically Jackie Chan's Wheels on Meals (1984) and Bruce Lee's Game of Death. Nishiyama later used its one-on-one boss battles as the basis for his fighting game Street Fighter. Nintendo's boxing sequel Super Punch-Out was released for arcades in late 1984 and ported by Elite to home computers as Frank Bruno's Boxing in 1985, features martial arts elements, high and low guarding, ducking, lateral dodging, and a KO meter. This meter is built up with successful attacks and, when full, enables a special, more powerful punch to be thrown. Broderbund's Karateka, designed by Jordan Mechner and released at the end of 1984, is a one-on-one fighting game for home computers that successfully added plot to its fighting action, like the beat 'em up Kung-Fu Master.

By early 1985, martial arts games had become popular in arcades. On home computers, the Japanese MSX version of Yie Ar Kung-Fu was released in January 1985, and Beam Software's The Way of the Exploding Fist was released for PAL regions in May 1985; The Way of the Exploding Fist borrowed heavily from Karate Champ, but nevertheless achieved critical success and afforded the burgeoning genre further popularity on home computers in PAL regions, becoming the UK's best-selling computer game of 1985. In North America, Data East ported Karate Champ to home computers in October 1985, becoming one of the best-selling computer games of the late 1980s. Other game developers also imitated Karate Champ, notably System 3's computer game International Karate, released in Europe in November 1985; after Epyx released it in North America in April 1986, Data East took unsuccessful legal action against Epyx over the game. Yie Ar Kung-Fu went on to become the UK's best-selling computer game of 1986, the second year in a row for fighting games. The same year, Martech's Uchi Mata for home computers featured novel controller motions for grappling maneuvers, but they were deemed too difficult.

In the late 1980s, side-scrolling beat 'em ups became considerably more popular than one-on-one fighting games, with many arcade game developers focused more on producing beat 'em ups and shoot 'em ups. Takashi Nishiyama used the one-on-one boss battles of his earlier beat 'em up Kung-Fu Master as the template for Capcom's fighting game Street Fighter, combined with elements of Karate Champ and Yie Ar Kung Fu. Street Fighter found its own niche in the gaming world, which was dominated by beat 'em ups and shoot 'em ups at the time. Part of the game's appeal was the use of special moves that could only be discovered by experimenting with the game controls, which created a sense of mystique and invited players to practice the game. Following Street Fighter's lead, the use of command-based hidden moves began to pervade other games in the rising fighting game genre. Street Fighter also introduced other staples of the genre, including the blocking technique, as well as the ability for a challenger to jump in and initiate a match against a player at any time. The game also introduced pressure-sensitive controls that determine the strength of an attack, though due to causing damaged arcade cabinets, Capcom replaced it soon after with a six-button control scheme offering light, medium, and hard punches and kicks, which became another staple of the genre.

In 1988, Home Data released Reikai Dōshi: Chinese Exorcist, also known as Last Apostle Puppet Show, the first fighting game to use digitized sprites and motion capture animation. Meanwhile, home game consoles largely ignored the genre. Budokan: The Martial Spirit was one of the few releases for the Sega Genesis, but was not as popular as games in other genres. Technical challenges limited the popularity of early fighting games. Programmers had difficulty producing a game that could recognize the fast motions of a joystick, and so players had difficulty executing special moves with any accuracy.

=== Mainstream success (early 1990s) ===
The release of Street Fighter II in 1991 is considered a revolutionary moment in the fighting game genre. Yoshiki Okamoto's team developed the most accurate joystick and button scanning routine in the genre thus far. This allowed players to reliably execute multi-button special moves, which had previously required an element of luck. The graphics took advantage of Capcom's CPS arcade chipset, with highly detailed characters and stages. Whereas previous games allowed players to combat a variety of computer-controlled fighters, Street Fighter II allowed players to play against each other. The popularity of Street Fighter II surprised the gaming industry, as arcade owners bought more machines to keep up with demand. Street Fighter II was also responsible for popularizing the combo mechanic, which came about when skilled players learned that they could combine several attacks that left no time for the opponent to recover if they timed them correctly. Its success led to fighting games becoming the dominant genre in the arcade game industry of the early 1990s, which led to a resurgence of the arcade game industry. The popularity of Street Fighter II led it to be released for home game consoles and becoming the defining template for fighting games.

SNK released Fatal Fury shortly after Street Fighter II in 1991. It was designed by Takashi Nishiyama, the creator of the original Street Fighter, which it was envisioned as a spiritual successor to. Fatal Fury placed more emphasis on storytelling and the timing of special moves, and added a two-plane system where characters could step into the foreground or background. Meanwhile, Sega experimented with Dark Edge, an early attempt at a 3D fighting game where characters could move in all directions. However, Sega never released the game outside Japan because it felt that "unrestrained" 3D fighting games were unenjoyable. Sega also attempted to introduce holographic 3D technology to the genre with Holosseum in 1992, though it was unsuccessful. Several fighting games achieved commercial success, including SNK's Art of Fighting and Samurai Shodown as well as Sega's Eternal Champions. Nevertheless, Street Fighter II remained the most popular, spawning a Champion Edition that improved game balance and allowed players to use boss characters that were unselectable in the previous version.

Chicago's Midway Games achieved unprecedented notoriety when they released Mortal Kombat in 1992. The game featured digital characters drawn from real actors, numerous secrets, and "Fatality" finishing maneuvers in which the player's character kills their opponent. The game earned a reputation for its gratuitous violence, and was adapted for home game consoles. The home version of Mortal Kombat was released on September 13, 1993, a day promoted as "Mortal Monday". The advertising resulted in line-ups to purchase the game and a subsequent backlash from politicians concerned about the game's violence. The Mortal Kombat franchise would achieve iconic status similar to that of Street Fighter with several sequels as well as movies, television series, and extensive merchandising. Numerous other game developers tried to imitate Street Fighter II and Mortal Kombat's financial success with similar games, including Nintendo and Rare's Killer Instinct, a game that featured unprecedentedly detailed pre-rendered 3D graphics and vastly improved on the core concept of combos, presenting a way faster gameplay than most other games of that era, specific combo-breaker maneuvers, and the "Ultra", a series of combined finishing moves surpassing the number of 20 hits; it was also marketed by Midway Games. Many of the games of that period were low budget clones of the more popular games, and in some cases this led to controversy; in 1994, Capcom USA took unsuccessful legal action against Data East over the 1993 arcade game Fighter's History, which supposedly plagiarized Street Fighter 2. Data East's largest objection in court was that their 1984 arcade game Karate Champ was the true originator of the competitive fighting game genre, which predated the original Street Fighter by three years, but the reason the case was decided against Capcom was that the copied elements were scènes à faire and thus excluded from copyright.

=== Emergence of 3D fighting games (mid-to-late 1990s) ===
Virtua Fighter (1993) is the first widespread 3D fighting game after a few earlier attempts by Sega and other companies. It is typical of such fighting games in that action takes place in a two-dimensional plane of motion. Here, one player ducks the other's attack.

Sega AM2 debuted in the genre with the 1993 arcade game Burning Rival, but they gained renown with the release of Virtua Fighter for the same platform the same year. It is the first fighting game with 3D polygon graphics and a viewpoint that zoomed and rotated with the action. Players were primarily confined to back and forth motion as seen in other fighting games, although gameplay incorporated early precursors to 3D mobility through knockdown side rolls and special attacks that shifted characters laterally. With only three buttons, it was easier to learn than Street Fighter and Mortal Kombat, which has six and five buttons respectively. By the time the game was released for the Sega Saturn in Japan, the game and system were selling at almost a one-to-one ratio. In 1994, Namco released Tekken, the rival arcade game introducing cutting-edge 3D polygon technology at a revolutionary 60 frames per second.

The 1995 PlayStation game Battle Arena Toshinden is credited for taking the genre into "true 3D" due to its introduction of the sidestep maneuver, which IGN described as "one little move" that "changed the fighter forever". The "sidestep" in the game, however, consisted of shoulder rolls instead of actual sidesteps. That year, Namco released Tekken 2, which introduced actual sidestepping or "mist steps" as first released in arcade games and in the international fighting game community. These moves are only exclusive to its protagonist, the penultimate boss of the arcade mode, Kazuya Mishima in his regular human state. The mist steps also allow combos to be performed as a manner of "crouch dashing," or when the Mishima player could run to the opponent while crouching since regular running prevented executing easy combos. Polygonal fighters became trendy and many developers started to make them. Further all-new titles were released in 1995: Zero Divide on the PlayStation, the Western-developed FX Fighter on PC and Criticom on console, and Sega's arcade Fighting Vipers - on top of Tekken 2, an updated Battle Arena Toshinden 2, and console ports of Tekken and Virtua Fighter 2. A multitude of new major polygonal releases arrived in 1996 from both prime and smaller developers. The 1996 arcade game Dead or Alive from Tecmo offered an interactive feature within its stages called the "danger zone", an environmental hazard outside the center of stages where if an opponent is knocked into it, they will take extra damage, jeopardizing their position and giving their attacker an advantage. If an opponent is knocked into the danger zone with very low health, the danger zone is more likely to knock them out than a regular attack. Other major 1996 releases include Virtua Fighter 3, Soul Edge, Last Bronx (in Japan), and the home port of Tekken 2, cementing 3D as the future of the genre.

In 1994, SNK released The King of Fighters '94 in arcades, where players choose from teams of three characters to eliminate each other one by one. Eventually, Capcom released further updates to Street Fighter II, including Super Street Fighter II and Super Street Fighter II Turbo. These games feature more characters and new moves, some of which are a response to hackers of the original Street Fighter II game to add new features. However, criticism of these updates grew as players demanded a true sequel. By 1995, the dominant franchises were the Mortal Kombat series in America and the Virtua Fighter series in Japan, with Street Fighter Alpha unable to match the popularity of Street Fighter II. Throughout this period, the fighting game was the dominant genre in competitive video gaming, with enthusiasts popularly attending arcades in order to find human opponents. The genre was also very popular on home consoles. At the beginning of 1996, GamePro (a magazine devoted chiefly to home console and handheld gaming) reported that for the last several years, their reader surveys had consistently yielded 4 out of 5 respondents name fighting games as their favorite genre.

In the late 1990s, traditional 2D fighting games began to decline in popularity, with specific franchises falling into difficulty due to 3D fighters. Although the release of Street Fighter EX introduced 3D graphics to the series, both it and Street Fighter: The Movie flopped in arcades. A home video game also titled Street Fighter: The Movie was released for the PlayStation and Sega Saturn, but it is not a port, but a separately produced game based on the same premise. Capcom released Street Fighter III in 1997 which features improved 2D visuals, but is also unable to match the impact of earlier games. Excitement stirred in Japan over Virtua Fighter 3 in arcades, and Sega eventually ported the game to its Dreamcast console. Meanwhile, SNK released several fighting games on its Neo Geo platform, including Samurai Shodown II in 1994, Real Bout Fatal Fury in 1995, The Last Blade in 1997, and annual updates to its The King of Fighters franchise. Garou: Mark of the Wolves from 1999 (part of the Fatal Fury series) was considered one of SNK's last great games; the company announced that it would close its doors in late 2001. Electronic Gaming Monthly reported that in 1996, U.S. gamers spent nearly $150 million on current generation fighting games, and in Japan, fighting games accounted for over 80% of video game sales.

The fighting game genre continued to evolve, with several strong 3D fighting games emerging in the late 1990s. Namco's Tekken (released in arcades in 1994 and on the PlayStation in 1995) proved critical to the PlayStation's early success, with its sequels also becoming some of the console's most important games. The Soul series of weapon-based fighting games also achieved considerable critical success, beginning with 1996's Soul Edge (known as Soul Blade outside Japan) to Soulcalibur VI in 2018. Tecmo released Dead or Alive in the arcades in 1996, porting it for the Sega Saturn in 1997 and PlayStation in 1998. It spawned a long-running franchise, known for its fast-paced control system, innovative counterattacks, and interactive environments. The series again included games important to the success of their respective consoles, such as Dead or Alive 3 for the Xbox and Dead or Alive 4 for the Xbox 360. In 1998, Bushido Blade, published by Square, introduced a realistic fighting engine that features three-dimensional environments while abandoning time limits and health bars in favor of an innovative Body Damage System, where a sword strike to a certain body part can amputate a limb or decapitate the head.

Video game enthusiasts took an interest in fictional crossovers, which feature characters from multiple franchises in a particular game. An early example of this type of fighting game is the 1996 arcade release X-Men vs. Street Fighter (which later became the Marvel vs. Capcom series), featuring comic book superheroes and characters from other Capcom games. In 1999, Nintendo released the first game in the Super Smash Bros. series, which allowed match-ups from various franchises, such as Pikachu vs. Mario.

=== Decline of Traditional 2D Games (early 2000s) ===
In the early 2000s, the fighting genre boom turned to bust. In retrospect, multiple developers attribute its decline to its increasing complexity and specialization, and to other factors such as over-saturation. This complexity shut out casual players, and the market for fighting games became smaller and more specialized. Even as far back as 1997, many in the industry said that the fighting game market's growing inaccessibility to newcomers was bringing an end to the genre's dominance. Furthermore, arcades gradually became less profitable throughout the late 1990s to early 2000s due to the increased technical power and popularity of home consoles. The early to mid 2000s is considered by some to be the "Dark Age" of fighting games. This term has been heavily criticized by some members of the fighting game community however. Maximilian Dood, a fighting game content creator, called this term specific to Capcom games, being built from the bias for the Street Fighter series in the United States. This is because of the rise of anime fighters, the 3D Tekken franchise, platform fighters including Super Smash Bros. Melee, and other fighting games. Sales of some of these series do not reflect the alleged decline in fighting games. Meanwhile, arcade games continued to thrive in other countries such as Japan.

The two most prolific developers of 2D fighting games, Capcom and SNK, combined intellectual property to produce SNK vs. Capcom games. SNK released the first game of this type, SNK vs. Capcom: The Match of the Millennium, for its Neo Geo Pocket Color handheld at the end of 1999. GameSpot regarded the game as "perhaps the most highly anticipated fighter ever" and called it the best fighting game ever to be released for a handheld console. Capcom released Capcom vs. SNK: Millennium Fight 2000 for arcades and the Dreamcast in 2000, followed by sequels in subsequent years. Though none matched the critical success of the handheld version, Capcom vs. SNK 2 EO was noted as the first game of the genre to successfully utilize internet competition. Other crossovers from 2008 included Tatsunoko vs. Capcom and Mortal Kombat vs. DC Universe. The most successful crossover, however, was Super Smash Bros. Brawl for the Wii. Featuring 40 characters from Nintendo and third-party franchises, the game was a runaway commercial success in addition to being lavished with critical praise.

In the new millennium, fighting games became less plentiful than in the mid-1990s, with multiplayer competition diversifying toward other genres. However, SNK reappeared in 2003 as SNK Playmore and continued to release games. Arc System Works received critical acclaim for releasing Guilty Gear X in 2001, as well as its sequel Guilty Gear XX, as both were 2D fighting games featuring striking anime-inspired graphics. Fighting games became a popular genre for amateur and doujin developers in Japan. The 2002 title Melty Blood was developed by then-amateur developer French Bread and achieved cult success on the PC. It became highly popular in arcades following its 2005 release, and a version was released for the PlayStation 2 the following year. The late 1990s and early 2000s saw the rise in online gaming. In 2004, Mortal Kombat: Deception, Dead or Alive Ultimate, and the Xbox version of Street Fighter Anniversary Collection became the first fighting games to offer online multiplayer and have received positive reception from critics. While the genre became generally far less popular than it once was, arcades and their attendant fighting games remained reasonably popular in Japan during this time period, and remain so even today. Virtua Fighter 5 lacked an online mode, but still achieved success both on home consoles and in arcades; players practiced at home and went to arcades to compete face-to-face with opponents. In addition to Virtua Fighter, the Tekken, Soul and Dead or Alive franchises continued to release installments. Classic Street Fighter and Mortal Kombat games were re-released on PlayStation Network and Xbox Live Arcade, allowing internet play, and in some cases, HD graphics.

The early part of the decade had seen the rise of competitive video gaming, referred to by the term Esports. The rise in esports saw the rise of major international fighting game tournaments such as Tougeki – Super Battle Opera and Evolution Championship Series, and famous players such as Daigo Umehara. An important fighting game at the time was Street Fighter III: 3rd Strike, originally released in 1999. The game gained significant attention with "Evo Moment 37", also known as the "Daigo Parry", which refers to a portion of a 3rd Strike semi-final match held at Evolution Championship Series 2004 (Evo 2004) between Daigo Umehara and Justin Wong. During this match, Umehara made an unexpected comeback by parrying 15 consecutive hits of Wong's "Super Art" move using Chun-Li while Umehara had only one pixel on his health bar. Umehara subsequently won the match. "Evo Moment #37" is frequently described as the most iconic and memorable moment in the history of competitive video gaming, compared to sports moments such as Babe Ruth's called shot and the Ice Hockey Miracle on Ice. It inspired many to start playing 3rd Strike, which brought new life into the fighting game community (FGC) during a time when the community was in a state of stagnation. Fighting games have also been featured in esports scenes with variety of gaming genres, with Dead or Alive 3 becoming the fighting game to be included in the Xbox Championship in 2004, and Dead or Alive Ultimate becoming the first fighting game to be included in the World Cyber Games (WCG) in 2005. Dead or Alive 4's competitive scene became the first competitive esport fighting game scene to be televised as it was the only fighting game included in the esport league, the Championship Gaming Series (CGS), in 2007 and 2008. The league was operated and fully broadcast by DirecTV in association with British Sky Broadcasting (BSkyB) and STAR TV. Dead or Alive has been credited for launching the careers of pro-gamer turned Koei Tecmo employee, Emmanuel Rodriguez, and the highest-paid women pro-gamers, Kat Gunn and Vanessa Arteaga.

=== Rebirth (late 2000s to present) ===
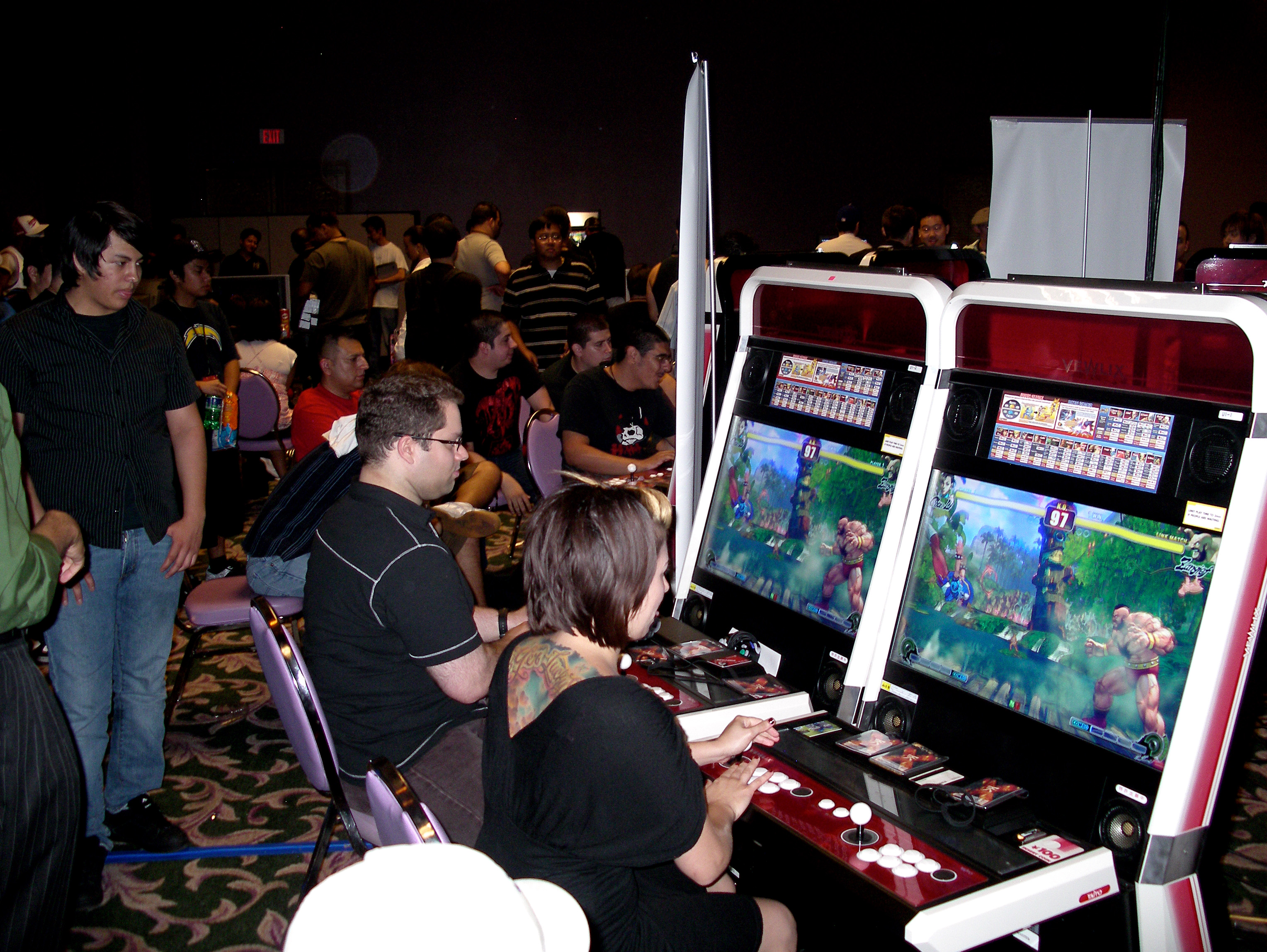
Street Fighter IV event at Evo 2009

The late 2000s featured a number of games that sparked another surge in fighting game popularity. Super Smash Bros. Brawl was released in early March 2008 to universal acclaim and went on to set a new record in sales, at one point selling at 120 units per minute. Another game was Street Fighter IV, the series' first mainline title since Street Fighter III: 3rd Strike in 1999, which was released in early 2009 also to critical acclaim, having garnered praise since its debut at Japanese arcades in July 2008. The console versions of Street Fighter IV, as well as the updated Super Street Fighter IV, sold more than 6 million copies over the next few years. The success of these two games, among others, sparked a renaissance for the genre, introducing new players to the genre and with the increased audience allowing other fighting game franchises to achieve successful revivals of their own, as well as increasing tournament participation. Tekken 6 was building off the popularity of its previous iteration and was still positively received, selling more than 3 million copies worldwide by August 2010, one year after its release. Other successful games that followed include Mortal Kombat, Marvel vs. Capcom 3, The King of Fighters XIII, Dead or Alive 5, Tekken Tag Tournament 2, Soulcalibur V, and Guilty Gear Xrd. Though the critically acclaimed Virtua Fighter 5 was released to very little acclaim in 2007, its update Virtua Fighter 5: Final Showdown received much more attention due to renewed interest in the genre. Online play, video platforms, and live streaming increased global connectivity after the decline of arcades, helping to reduce regional disparities and broaden competitive parity beyond Japan, which had dominated the tournament scene for much of the 1990s and 2000s.

Numerous indie fighting games have also been crowdfunded on websites such as Kickstarter and Indiegogo, the most notable success being the tag team fighting game Skullgirls in 2012. Later, in 2019, Ubisoft reported that the free-to-play platform fighting game Brawlhalla reached 20 million players, with it climbing to 80 million by 2022.

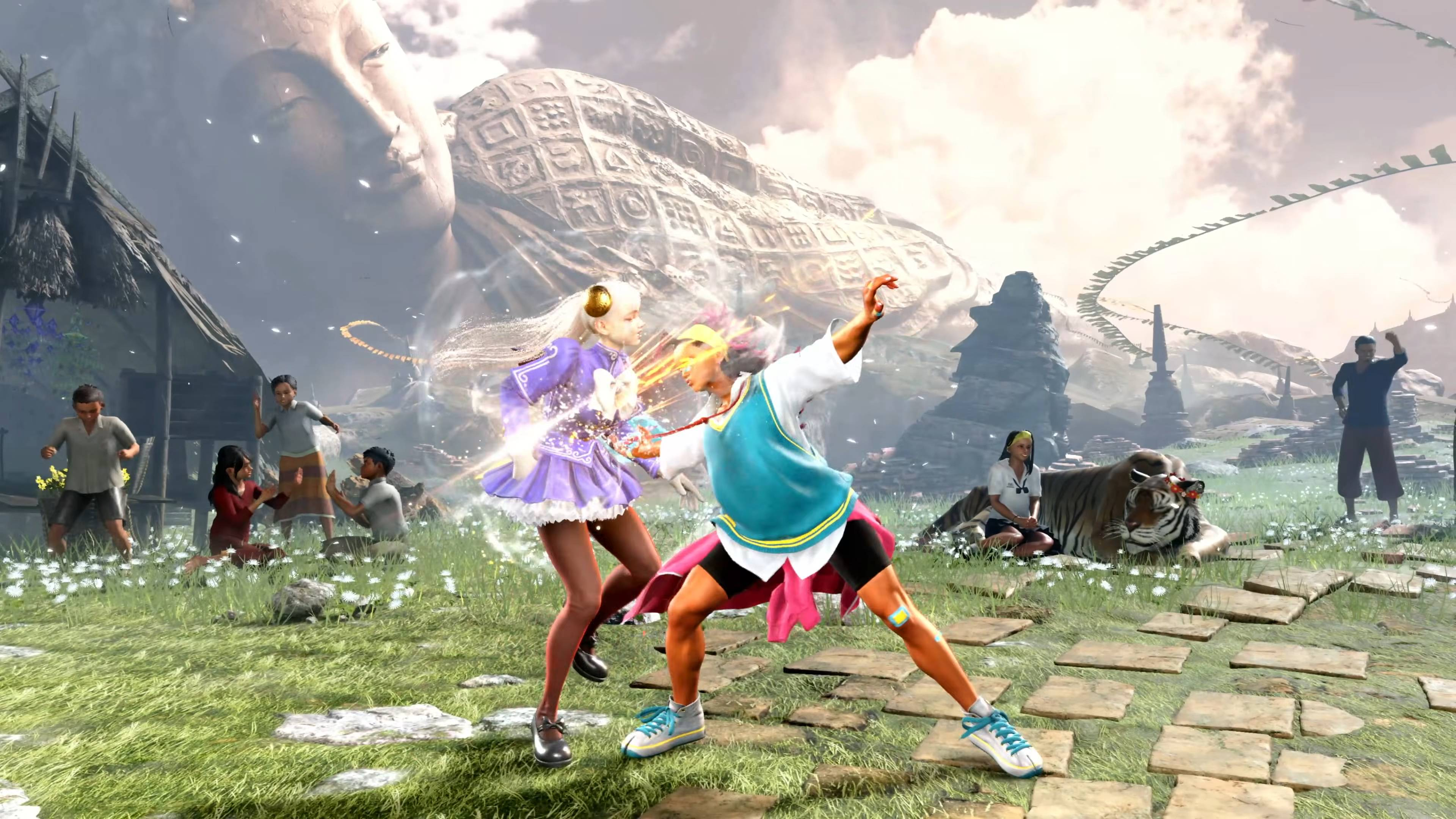
Street Fighter 6 is cited as a point of resurgence in fighting games.

In 2018, Super Smash Bros. Ultimate for the Nintendo Switch was released. It became the best-selling fighting game of all time, topping its Wii predecessor Super Smash Bros. Brawl and introduced nearly 90 characters through its default mode and through downloadable content or DLC, having sold 38.14 million copies worldwide. Later in the mid-2020s, the genre achieved another renaissance with the arrival of Street Fighter 6 and its immediate success, together with Mortal Kombat 1 and Tekken 8. Street Fighter 6 sold over 1 million copies within five days after its launch, and sold over 3 million copies by January 2024. Mortal Kombat 1 sold over 2 million copies in its first two months, and garnered over 3 million copies by January 2024, while the latest game Tekken 8, which was released in January 2024 sold over 2 million copies in its first month alone. Thus, the 2020s have had a marked resurgence in fighting games that has been deemed a new golden age in fighting games.

== Financial performance ==
=== Highest-grossing franchises ===
The following are the highest-grossing fighting game franchises, in terms of total gross revenue generated by arcade games, console games, and computer games.

Rank	Franchise	Debut	Creator(s)	Owner	Gross revenue	Subgenre	As of	Ref.
1	Street Fighter	1987	Takashi Nishiyama; Hiroshi Matsumoto	Capcom	$10.6 billion	2D	2020	
2	Mortal Kombat	1992	Ed Boon; John Tobias	Warner Bros. Interactive Entertainment	$5.054 billion (including other media)	2D	2006	

=== Best-selling franchises ===
==== Arcade ====
The following are the best-selling fighting arcade video game franchises that have sold at least 10,000 arcade units. The prices of fighting game arcade units ranged from $1,300 (equivalent to $3,000 in 2025) for Street Fighter II Dash (Champion Edition) in 1992, up to $21,000 (equivalent to $47,000 in 2025) for Virtua Fighter (1993). In addition to unit sales, arcade games typically earned the majority of their gross revenue from coin drop earnings.

Rank	Franchise	Debut	Creator(s)	Owner	Arcade unit sales	Subgenre	As of	Ref.
1	Street Fighter	1987	Takashi Nishiyama; Hiroshi Matsumoto	Capcom	500,000	2D	2002	
2	Virtua Fighter	1993	Yu Suzuki; Seiichi Ishii	Sega	110,000+	3D	1997	(Note: Virtua Fighter series arcade unit sales: Virtua Fighter – 40,000+ (as of 1996); Virtua Fighter 2 – 40,000+ (as of 1996); Virtua Fighter 3 – 30,000 (as of 1997))
3	Tekken	1994	Seiichi Ishii; Namco	Bandai Namco Entertainment	94,000+	3D	2000	(Note: Tekken series arcade unit sales: Tekken 2 – 40,000 (as of 1996); Tekken 3 – 35,000 (as of 1997); Tekken Tag Tournament – 19,000 (as of 2000))
4	Mortal Kombat	1992	Ed Boon; John Tobias	Warner Bros. Interactive Entertainment	51,000+	2D	2002	
5	Darkstalkers	1994	Junichi Ohno; Alex Jimenez	Capcom	24,000+	2D	1996	

==== Home ====
The following are the best-selling fighting game franchises for home systems, having sold at least 10 million software units for game consoles and personal computers.

Rank	Franchise	Debut	Creator(s)	Owner(s)	Software sales	Subgenre	As of	Ref.
1	Mortal Kombat	1992	Ed Boon, John Tobias and Midway Games	Warner Bros. Interactive Entertainment	100 million	2D	May 2025	
2	Super Smash Bros.	1999	Masahiro Sakurai and HAL Laboratory	Nintendo	79.43 million	Platform	June 2026	(Note: Super Smash Bros. series sales: Super Smash Bros.: 5.55 million worldwide; Super Smash Bros. Melee: 7.09 million; Super Smash Bros. Brawl: 13.32 million; Super Smash Bros. for Nintendo 3DS and Wii U: 15.02 million combined (9.64 million for 3DS, 5.38 million for Wii U); Super Smash Bros. Ultimate: 38.14 million)
3	Tekken	1994	Seiichi Ishii and Namco	Bandai Namco Entertainment	58 million	3D	February 2025	(Note: Tekken series sales: Up until 2023 - 55 million; Tekken 8 - 3 million)
4	Street Fighter	1987	Takashi Nishiyama and Hiroshi Matsumoto	Capcom	56 million	2D	March 2025	
5	Naruto: Ultimate Ninja	2003	Masashi Kishimoto (manga) and CyberConnect2 (games)	Bandai Namco Entertainment	32.52 million	Arena	March 2023	
6	Soulcalibur	1996	Hiroaki Yotoriyama and Namco	Bandai Namco Entertainment	17 million	3D	July 2021	(Note: Soulcalibur series sales: Up until 2018 - 15 million; Soulcalibur VI - 2 million)
7	Marvel vs. Capcom	1996	Akira Yasuda, Ryota Niitsuma, Noritaka Funamizu and Tsuyoshi Nagayama	Capcom and Marvel Games	12 million	2D	December 2024	
8	Dead or Alive	1996	Tomonobu Itagaki and Team Ninja	Koei Tecmo	11 million	3D	April 2026	

=== Best-selling fighting games ===
==== Arcade ====
The following games are the top ten best-selling fighting arcade video games, in terms of arcade units sold. The prices of fighting game arcade units ranged from $1,300 (equivalent to $3,000 in 2025) for Street Fighter II Dash (Champion Edition) in 1992, up to $21,000 (equivalent to $47,000 in 2025) for Virtua Fighter (1993). In addition to unit sales, arcade games typically earned the majority of their gross revenue from coin drop earnings, which are unknown for most games. Arcade revenue figures, from unit sales and coin drop earnings, are listed if known.

Rank	Title	Release	Developer	Manufacturer	Arcade unit sales	Gross revenue	Inflation	Subgenre	Ref.
1	Street Fighter II	1991	Capcom	Capcom	221,000+	$5.31 billion+	$12.6 billion	2D	(Note: See Street Fighter II § Reception)
2	Virtua Fighter	1993	Sega AM2	Sega	40,000+	Unknown	Unknown	3D	
2	Virtua Fighter 2	1994	Sega AM2	Sega	40,000+	Unknown	Unknown	3D	
4	Tekken 2	1996	Namco	Namco	40,000	Unknown	Unknown	3D	
5	Tekken 3	1997	Namco	Namco	35,000	Unknown	Unknown	3D	
6	Karate Champ	1984	Technōs Japan	Data East	30,000+	Unknown	Unknown	2D	
7	Virtua Fighter 3	1996	Sega AM2	Sega	30,000	Unknown	Unknown	3D	
8	Street Fighter	1987	Capcom	Capcom	10,000–50,000	Unknown	Unknown	2D	
9	Mortal Kombat II	1993	Midway Games	Midway Games	27,000	$600 million	$1.34 billion	2D	
10	Mortal Kombat	1992	Midway Games	Midway Games	24,000	$570 million	$1.31 billion	2D	
10	Darkstalkers: The Night Warriors	1994	Capcom	Capcom	24,000	Unknown	Unknown	2D	

==== Home ====
The following games are the top ten best-selling fighting games for home systems, in terms of software units sold for game consoles and personal computers.

Rank	Title	Release	Developer	Publisher	Platform(s)	Software sales	Subgenre	Ref.
1	Super Smash Bros. Ultimate	2018	Bandai Namco & Sora	Nintendo	Switch	38.14 million	2D	
2	Street Fighter II	1992	Capcom	Capcom	Multi-platform	15.5 million	2D	
3	Super Smash Bros. 4	2014	Bandai Namco & Sora	Nintendo	3DS & Wii U	15.02 million	2D	
4	Mortal Kombat 11	2019	NetherRealm	Warner Bros.	Multi-platform	15 million	2D	
4	Naruto Shippuden: Ultimate Ninja Storm 4	2016	CyberConnect2	Bandai Namco	Multi-platform	15 million	Arena	
6	Super Smash Bros. Brawl	2008	Sora	Nintendo	Wii	13.32 million	2D	
7	Tekken 7	2017	Bandai Namco	Bandai Namco	Multi-platform	12 million	3D	
8	Mortal Kombat X	2015	NetherRealm	Warner Bros.	Multi-platform	11 million	2D	
9	Dragon Ball FighterZ	2018	Arc System Works	Bandai Namco	Multi-platform	10 million	2D	
9	Dragon Ball Xenoverse 2	2016	Dimps	Bandai Namco	Multi-platform	10 million	Arena	
9	Street Fighter IV	2009	Capcom	Capcom	Multi-platform	10 million	2D	

== See also ==
- Fighting game community
- List of fighting games
- M.U.G.E.N.
- Platform fighter
