= Shenmue III =

2019 video game

- Developer: Ys Net
- Publishers: Deep Silver (2019–2024); Inin Games (2024–present)
- Directors: Yu Suzuki; Keiji Okayasu
- Producers: Yu Suzuki; Cédric Biscay
- Designer: Aki Tsuchie
- Programmers: Kazuya Tomii; Eric Layton Bergen
- Writers: Yu Suzuki; Jyunichi Yoshida
- Composer: Ryuji Iuchi
- Series: Shenmue
- Engine: Unreal Engine 4
- Platforms: PlayStation 4; Windows; PlayStation 5; Xbox Series X/S; Nintendo Switch 2
- Release: November 19, 2019: PS4, Windows; WW: November 19, 2019; Enhanced; Switch 2, PS5, Xbox Series X/S, Windows; WW: Q1/Q2 2027
- Genres: Action-adventure, life simulation, social simulation
- Mode: Single-player

Shenmue III (Note: Japanese: シェンムー3, Hepburn: Shenmū 3) is a 2019 action-adventure game developed by Ys Net and published by Deep Silver for the PlayStation 4 and Windows. Like the previous Shenmue games, it consists of open-world environments interspersed with brawler battles and quick time events, with a day-and-night system, variable weather effects, non-player characters with daily schedules, and various minigames. Players control the teenage martial artist Ryo Hazuki, who continues his search for his father's killer in the mountains of 1980s Guilin, China.

The director, Yu Suzuki, conceived Shenmue as a saga spanning multiple games. Shenmue and Shenmue II were developed by Sega AM2 and published by Sega for the Dreamcast in 1999 and 2001. The original Shenmue was the most expensive video game ever developed at the time, though this development also covered some of Shenmue II and groundwork for future Shenmue games. The games attracted positive reviews and a cult following, but were commercial failures.

At E3 2015, following years of speculation, Suzuki launched a Kickstarter campaign to crowdfund Shenmue III, with Sega having licensed Shenmue to Suzuki's company Ys Net. It became the fastest campaign to raise $2 million, in under seven hours, and ended the following month having raised over $6 million, making it the highest-funded video game in Kickstarter history at the time. Further funding came from Sony and Deep Silver and crowdfunding on other platforms. The development team was much smaller than that of previous Shenmue games, though key staff from the original team returned. Shenmue III was developed using Unreal Engine 4.

Shenmue III was released on November 19, 2019, 18 years after Shenmue II. It received mixed reviews; some critics praised its faithfulness to the franchise, while others found it outdated. Retail sales were low, but excluded digital sales and copies sent to Kickstarter backers. The CEO of Deep Silver's parent company, Embracer Group, said Shenmue III had been "fine" financially. An enhanced version for newer platforms is scheduled for early 2027. Suzuki expressed his hope to develop Shenmue IV.

== Gameplay ==
Like the previous Shenmue games, the player controls the teenage martial artist Ryo Hazuki, who is searching for his father's killer. Most of the game is spent exploring the open world in Guilin, China, searching for clues, examining objects and talking to non-player characters for information.

The 3D fighting system is similar to the Virtua Fighter series; Ryo can practice moves to increase their power. The fighting system was redesigned to make it accessible to less experienced players. In quick time events, the player must press the right buttons at the right moment to succeed. Ryo can earn money through minigames such as gambling, fishing, wood chopping and forklift driving, and by selling foraged herbs.

Shenmue III introduces a stamina system, whereby Ryo's hit points (HP) gradually decline as the player explores. If his HP drops too low, he loses the ability to sprint while exploring. Ryo can restore HP through sleeping and eating.

== Plot ==
In 1987, the teenage martial artist Ryo Hazuki has journeyed from Yokosuka, Japan, to the mountains of Guilin, China, in search of his father's killer, Lan Di. Ryo and his new friend, Ling Shenhua, search for Shenhua's missing father, the stonemason Yuan, in Shenhua's hometown of Bailu Village. They learn that thugs have been harassing the local stonemasons, looking for the phoenix mirror, which Ryo has brought from his father's dojo. Another stonemason, Xu, is also missing. Ryo defeats two of the thugs, but is defeated by their boss, Yanlang.

Ryo learns that Lan Di's father, Zhao Sunming, visited Bailu Village with Ryo's father to train under the local grandmaster. Zhao died under mysterious circumstances several years later. Ryo also discovers that the phoenix and dragon mirrors were created by Yuan's grandfather at the request of the Chinese emperor. Their creation is connected to the local Verdant Bridge, constructed to honor the visit of a Chinese envoy.

At the thugs' hideout, Ryo is defeated again by Yanlang. He convinces Sun, a local martial arts master, to teach him a powerful Bajiquan move, and uses it to defeat Yanlang. A village elder helps them discover a map to the treasure connected to the mirrors. Ryo fends off an attack from Lan Di's henchman, Chai, who reveals that Yuan and Xu have been taken to the city of Niaowu.

Ryo and Shenhua travel to Niaowu by boat. Ryo learns that a local gang, the Red Snakes, is holding Yuan and Xu. Ryo encounters his Hong Kong ally, Wuying Ren, who has traveled to Niaowu in pursuit of the treasure connected to the mirrors. At the Red Snakes’ hideout, Ryo and Ren are defeated by their boss, Ge, who uses an animalistic fighting style. Ryo meets a cormorant fisherman, Grandmaster Bei, who teaches him a similar Bajiquan move to defeat the Red Snakes.

Ryo and Ren approach the hideout, only to find Li Feng, a mysterious woman whom Ryo has encountered previously in Niaowu. She tells them that the Red Snakes have kidnapped Shenhua and taken her across the river to a castle. Ryo convinces Bei to take him and Ren by boat. Before departing, Ren reveals that he has acquired a counterfeit phoenix mirror, believing it could be useful.

The three cross the river with Hsu, a former student of Bei, and Lin Shiling, the maiden of a local shrine. Ryo and Ren infiltrate the castle while the others guard the perimeter. Ryo finds Yuan and Xu trapped in a cell; Ryo defeats Chai again and releases them. In the process, they learn that Li Feng is a Chi You Men leader: Niao Sun. Ryo gives her the real phoenix mirror to spare Shenhua's life, and Niao Sun tells them Lan Di is up ahead.

Ryo and Ren fight their way to the top of the castle, defeat Ge, and find Lan Di. Ryo challenges him to a fight, but Lan Di defeats him easily. Ren offers Lan Di the counterfeit phoenix mirror in exchange for Ryo's life. Lan Di accepts, but Ren hurls the mirror out of a window. Niao Sun has her men distract Lan Di in the castle and consolidate her power, and Ryo and Ren escape.

Ryo, Shenhua, Ren, Yuan, and Xu depart Niaowu by boat. On board, Yuan reveals that the mirrors were initially locked away in a cliff temple; Zhao Sunming retrieved them to keep them from "falling into the wrong hands". After Zhao died, his son, Lan Di, was raised by the Chi You Men. While captive, Yuan also learned that the Chi You have taken over the cliff temple. Ryo, Shenhua, and Ren continue their journey along the Great Wall of China.

== Background ==
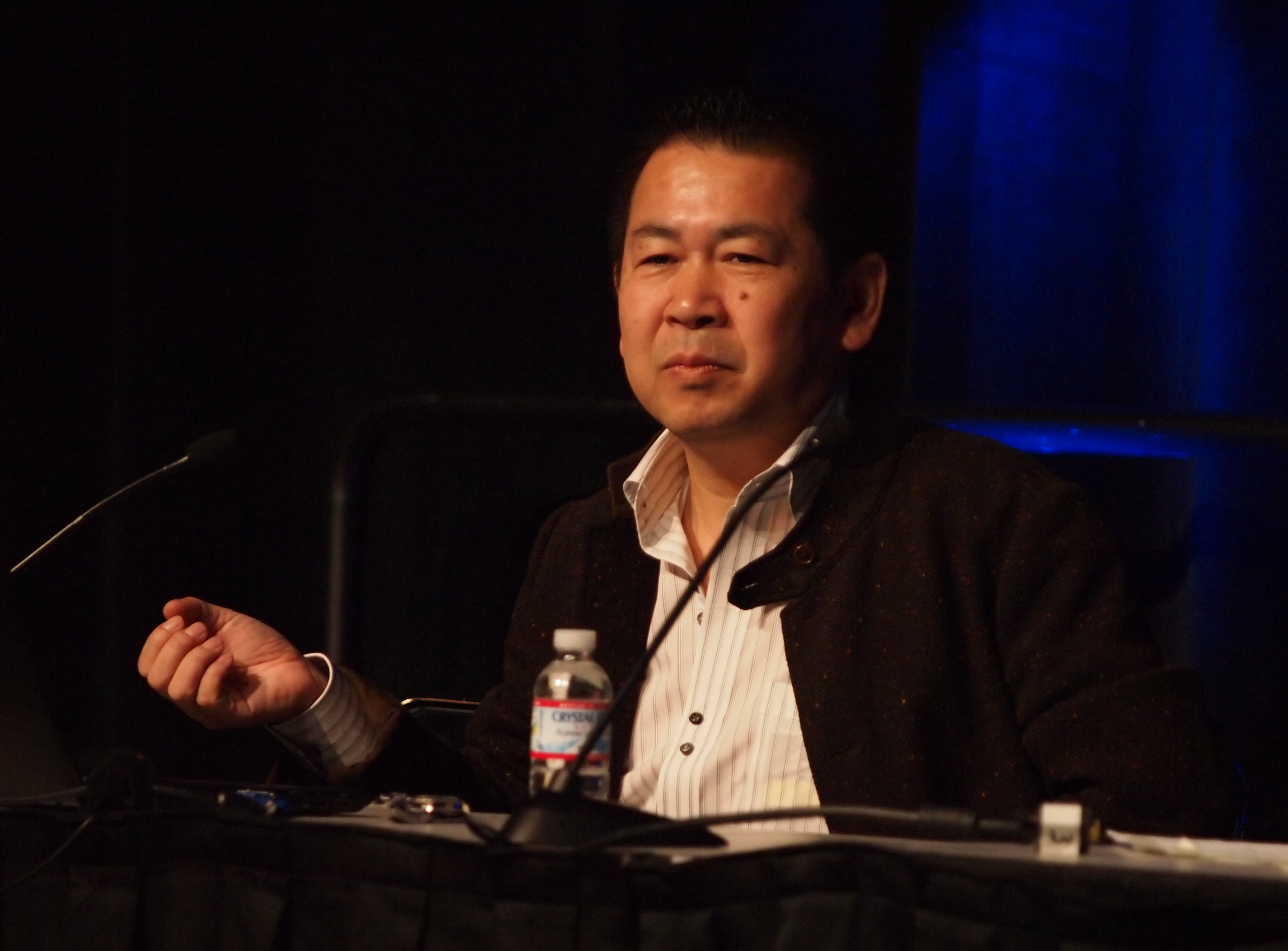
The Shenmue creator, Yu Suzuki, speaking at the 2011 Game Developers Conference

The first two Shenmue games were developed by Sega AM2 and published by Sega for the Dreamcast in 1999 and 2001. The director, Yu Suzuki, planned to tell the story across multiple games. With a level of detail considered unprecedented, the original Shenmue was the most expensive video game ever developed at the time, reported to have cost between US$47 and 70 million, including marketing. The development also covered some of Shenmue II, which was completed for a smaller figure, and groundwork for future Shenmue games.

Despite attracting a cult following and appearances in several greatest video games of all time lists, the first two Shenmue games were commercial failures. Suzuki worked on various projects which failed to see release, including Shenmue Online, a massively multiplayer online role-playing game for the Chinese and Korean PC markets.

Fans petitioned for Shenmue III, and in 2005 the BBC series VideoGaiden ran a campaign for its release. On several occasions, Sega spokespersons said they recognized the interest in Shenmue and did not rule out another game, and Suzuki said that Sega would be open to the project with the right budget. In 2008, Suzuki established his own development company, Ys Net, while remaining at Sega. That year, Sega announced Shenmue City, a social game for the Japanese services Mobagetown (for cell phones) and Mobage (PC). Suzuki hoped that if Shenmue City were a success it would allow him to make Shenmue III. However, it was shut down in December 2011.

In September 2011, Suzuki left Sega to focus on Ys Net. In 2012, he suggested that Sega could license Shenmue to Ys Net to develop Shenmue III independently. News arose in March 2013 that Suzuki was considering crowdfunding or console exclusivity to fund Shenmue III. During the 2014 Game Developers Conference, Sony Computer Entertainment approached Suzuki about Shenmue III as it was one of the most requested games. In March 2014, Phil Spencer, the head of Xbox, said Shenmue III was the most requested sequel from Xbox owners. Sega renewed the Shenmue trademark that May.

== Funding ==
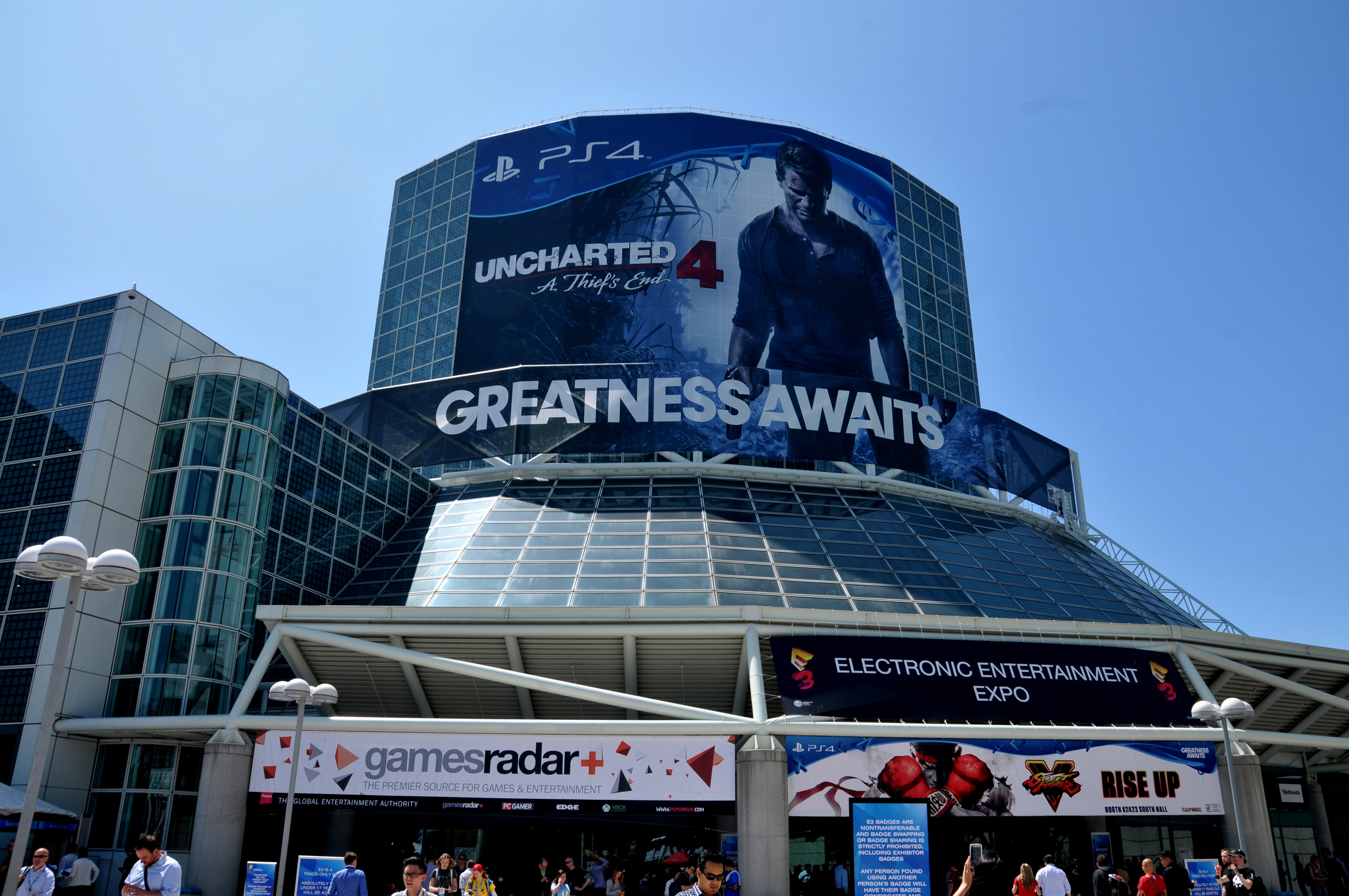
Shenmue III was announced at E3 in June 2015.

On June 14, 2015, the day before the Los Angeles E3 industry event, Suzuki tweeted "E3" with a photo of a forklift, a reference to a minigame in the original Shenmue. During Sony's E3 press conference the next day, Suzuki announced a Kickstarter crowdfunding campaign to develop Shenmue III for PlayStation 4 and Windows with a tentative release date of December 2017. The surprise announcement drew publicity, winning the "Best Debut" award from GameTrailers and generating a surge in sales of pre-owned Dreamcast consoles. In January 2017, Time, The Guardian and Den of Geek included Shenmue III in their lists of anticipated games.

The initial Kickstarter funding goal, the amount necessary for the campaign to succeed and development to begin, was $2 million. Additional goals, to encourage further donations, included a "rapport system" that changes interactions with characters depending on player choices, and a "skill tree system" allowing for greater customization of Ryo's fighting abilities. Suzuki said that for Shenmue III to be a "true" open-world game, the campaign would need to raise at least $10 million, but that he would not be disappointed by a smaller figure and would work within the budget.

Shenmue III became the fastest game to raise $1 million in crowdfunding, in an hour and 44 minutes, and the fastest to raise $2 million, in eight hours and 43 minutes. Crowdfunding ended on July 17, having raised $6.3 million from over 69,000 backers, becoming the highest-funded video game in Kickstarter history at the time. On September 17, crowdfunding resumed using the online payment system PayPal. On March 15, the project began accepting pledges through the Chinese crowdfunding platform Alipay.

Crowdfunding ended in September 2018, having raised $7,179,510 from 81,087 backers across multiple platforms. Though this is a large amount for a crowdfunded project, it was relatively small for a high-profile game. Sony and Deep Silver provided further funding. Suzuki said the final budget was around $20 million.

== Development ==
Shenmue III was developed by Suzuki's development studio Ys Net, with production, marketing, and publishing support from Sony and Shibuya Productions. Whereas Shenmue and Shenmue II were developed by between 250 and 300 people, Shenmue III had a core team of about 75, with a further 100 outsourced roles, excluding voice actors. Ten key staff had worked on the previous Shenmue games, including Suzuki, the second director Keiji Okayasu, the scenario director Takao Yotsuji, the writers Junichi Yoshida and Masahiro Yoshimoto, the character designers Kenji Miyawaki and Hideki Kawabata and the composer Ryuji Iuchi. The chief executive of Neilo, Takeshi Hirai, was a lead programmer on the first Shenmue. Other staff had worked on games such as The Legend of Zelda: Breath of the Wild and Sega franchises such as Streets of Rage and Virtua Fighter. Masaya Matsukaze and Corey Marshall reprised their roles as the Japanese and English voices of Ryo. The Indian studio Lakshya Digital provided additional character models.

In November 2015, Suzuki visited China to promote the project and research the locations, traditional clothes and martial arts of Guilin. In a presentation at China's Chuapp conference that month, he said that Shenmue III's story and "composition" were complete and that "baseline research" with Unreal Engine 4 had begun. Suzuki chose the engine as it allowed the team to build prototypes quickly. In late 2015, the team began using Shenmue II characters to run simple battle and conversation tests. In February 2016, Suzuki demonstrated the weather effects, lighting and music at the Monaco Anime Game International Conference. By December, the game had left preproduction and motion capture and voice tests were under way.

In June 2017, Shenmue III was delayed to the second half of 2018. According to Suzuki, it had become "bigger and more beautiful" than he expected through the use of new technology. That August, Suzuki announced that Ys Net had partnered with the publisher Deep Silver to publish Shenmue III globally. He told Eurogamer that this allowed them to make a larger open world, and that Sony and Sega were still supporting development. Ys Net released a teaser trailer on August 22, 2017. It received criticism for its "stiff" character models and animation.

In May 2018, Ys Net and Deep Silver delayed Shenmue III until 2019. At the Gamescom trade fair that August, Deep Silver displayed a new trailer and announced a release date of August 27, 2019. A new trailer was shown in March 2019 at the Monaco Magic festival, showcasing the Guilin setting, fighting system, and several new characters. In June, Shenmue III was delayed to November 19. A new trailer, showcasing arcades and fighting gameplay, debuted at the Gamescom trade fair that August.

Shenmue III includes a letter to fans from Suzuki expressing his hope to develop Shenmue IV. Suzuki told IGN he had created Shenmue III "for the fans", and that he planned to give Shenmue IV more mainstream appeal.

== Release ==
Shenmue III was released on November 19, 2019, 18 years after Shenmue II. A demo was released for Windows in September 2019. The Windows version of Shenmue III was exclusive to the Epic Games Store for the first year. The exclusivity announcement drew criticism from some fans, and Kickstarter backers who had requested the Steam version were offered refunds. In China, Shenmue III was published by Oasis Games on PlayStation 4 and the WeGame platform on PC.

In January 2020, Ys Net released the downloadable content (DLC) "Battle Rally", in which players compete in arcade-style races as Ryo, Ren or Ryo's sparring partner Wei Zhen. The "story quest" DLC was released in February, and features the return of Zhang Shuqin from Shenmue II. The third DLC expansion, "Big Merry Cruise", was released in March. In April 2021, fans released a mod for the PC version that replaces the voices of Greg Chun and Kyle McCarley as Ren and Lan Di with Eric Kelso and Paul Lucas, who voiced them in the original games.

On November 19, 2024, Ys Net announced that the publishing rights had transferred from Deep Silver to Inin Games. On 18 August, 2025, Inin announced Shenmue III Enhanced for Windows, PlayStation 5, Xbox Series X and Series S, and Nintendo Switch 2, with changes including improved visuals, new camera options, more non-player characters, and gameplay alterations. It is scheduled for early 2027.

== Reception ==
Reception

Aggregate score
Aggregator	Score
Metacritic	PC: 69/100; PS4: 67/100

Review scores
Publication	Score
Destructoid	7/10
Eurogamer	Recommended
Famitsu	32/40
Game Informer	6/10
GameSpot	5/10
GamesRadar+	4/5
IGN	5.9/10
PC Gamer (US)	83/100
Push Square	7/10
RPGamer	3.5/5
The Guardian	4/5
USgamer	2.5/5
VG247	3/5

According to the review aggregator website Metacritic, Shenmue III received "mixed or average reviews". Reviewers were divided over its similarity to the older games; some felt it was a faithful sequel, while others criticized it as outdated. According to Matthew Handrahan of GamesIndustry.biz, "Ys Net hasn't rebooted or reimagined its franchise; rather, it has made a game as if (for the most part) the intervening years never happened at all."

Martin Robinson of Eurogamer described Shenmue III as "archaic and arcane ... completely ignorant of modern trends in open world gaming, or indeed trends of the last 20 years ... It looks and plays like a Dreamcast game that's as off-kilter, maddening, magical and majestic as the original Shenmue games, both all-time classics. I think there's good reason to rejoice in that."

Kirk McKeand of VG247 wrote that he enjoyed Shenmue III despite its "decades-old sensibilities". Justin Towell of GamesRadar+ described it as "a magnificent, authentic, totally uncompromised sequel that crucially ignores virtually every gaming trend of the past 18 years". Kyle Hilliard of IGN criticized the plot, feeling it moved the series no closer to a conclusion. At the 2020 NAVGTR Awards, Shenmue III won for best franchise adventure game and was nominated for best franchise original light mix score.

=== Sales ===
In Japan, the PlayStation 4 version of Shenmue III sold 17,857 retail copies in its first week, making it the week's fourth-bestselling game and the bestselling new release. In the UK, Shenmue III entered the charts at number 17, selling half as many copies as the 2018 Shenmue remaster. GamesIndustry.biz and VG247 said the sales in both regions were likely lower than hoped, but noted that the chart excludes digital sales and copies given to Kickstarter backers. Lars Wingefors, the CEO of Deep Silver's parent company, Embracer Group, said that Shenmue III had been "fine" financially and that it was a "core niche product".
