= Shenmue (video game) =

- North American cover art
- Developer: AM2 of CRI (Note: Ported to PlayStation 4, Windows, and Xbox One by D3T)
- Publisher: Sega
- Directors: Yu Suzuki; Keiji Okayasu; Toshihiro Nagoshi
- Producers: Yu Suzuki; Toshihiro Nagoshi
- Designer: Eigo Kasahara
- Programmer: Keiji Okayasu
- Artist: Masanori Ohe
- Writers: Yu Suzuki; Masahiro Yoshimoto; Takao Yotsuji
- Composers: Takenobu Mitsuyoshi; Yuzo Koshiro
- Series: Shenmue
- Platforms: Dreamcast; PlayStation 4; Windows; Xbox One
- Release: December 29, 1999: Dreamcast; JP: December 29, 1999; NA: November 7, 2000; EU: December 1, 2000 Windows, Xbox One; WW: August 21, 2018 PlayStation 4; WW: August 21, 2018; JP: November 22, 2018
- Genres: Action-adventure, life simulation, social simulation
- Mode: Single-player

Shenmue (Note: Japanese: シェンムー 一章 横須賀, Hepburn: Shenmū Isshō: Yokosuka; pronounced [ɕemmɯː iɕɕoː jokosɯ̥ka], approximately /ˈʃɛn.muː/ SHEN-moo. Translating to "Shenmue Chapter 1: Yokosuka".) is a 1999 action-adventure game created by Yu Suzuki and developed and published by Sega for the Dreamcast. It follows the teenage martial artist Ryo Hazuki as he sets out in revenge for the murder of his father in 1980s Yokosuka, Japan. The player explores an open world, fighting opponents in brawler battles and encountering quick-time events. The environmental detail was considered unprecedented, with numerous interactive 3D objects, a day-and-night system, variable weather effects, non-player characters with daily schedules and various minigames.

After developing successful arcade games including Virtua Fighter, Suzuki wanted to create a longer experience and conceived Shenmue as a multi-part epic. In 1996, Sega AM2 began work on a role-playing game for the Sega Saturn set in the Virtua Fighter world. Development moved to the Dreamcast in 1997 and the Virtua Fighter connection was dropped. Shenmue became the most expensive video game ever developed at the time, with an estimated production and marketing cost of $47–70 million, though this also covered some of Shenmue II (2001), developed in tandem.

Despite sales of 1.2 million, Shenmue did not recoup its development cost and was a commercial failure. It received positive reviews for its graphics, soundtrack and ambition, though its slow pace and emphasis on mundane detail divided players. It attracted a cult following, appeared in several lists of the greatest video games of all time, and is credited for pioneering game mechanics such as quick-time events and open worlds. Later appraisal has been mixed, with criticism for the controls, voice acting and slow pace.

After the release of Shenmue II, which was also a commercial failure, Suzuki left Sega. In 2018, Sega released high-definition ports of Shenmue and Shenmue II for multiple formats. Following a successful crowdfunding campaign, Suzuki developed Shenmue III (2019) independently. An anime adaptation of Shenmue premiered in 2022.

== Gameplay ==
The player controls the teenage martial artist Ryo Hazuki as he investigates his father's murder in Yokosuka in 1986. They explore the open world, searching for clues, examining objects and talking to non-player characters. Occasionally, Ryo battles opponents in fighting sequences similar to Sega's Virtua Fighter series; outside of combat, players can practice moves to increase their power. In quick-time events, the player must press the right button within a time limit to succeed.

Shenmue features a persistent world with detail considered unprecedented for games at the time. Shops open and close, buses run to timetables, and characters have routines, each per the in-game clock. The player can inspect objects including drawers, cabinets and shelves, though not all objects are interactive.

Edge described Shenmue as "a game of middle management, often composed of the unglamorous daily grinds—being home for bedtime, wisely spending money earned from a day job, or training combat moves through lonely practice—that other games bypass". Ryo receives a daily allowance which can be spent on items including food, raffle tickets, audio cassettes and capsule toys. There are several minigames; in the local arcade, for example, Ryo can throw darts or play complete versions of the Sega arcade games Hang-On and Space Harrier. Later in the game, Ryo gets a part-time job at the docks and must ferry crates between warehouses and compete in races using a forklift.

== Plot ==
In Yokosuka, Japan, 1986, the teenage martial arts student Ryo Hazuki returns to his family dojo to witness a confrontation between his father, Iwao, and a Chinese man, Lan Di. Lan Di easily incapacitates Ryo, and threatens to kill him unless Iwao gives him a mysterious stone artifact, the dragon mirror. Iwao tells him the mirror is buried under the cherry blossom tree outside. As his men recover the mirror, Lan Di mentions a man he claims Iwao killed in China. He delivers a finishing blow and Iwao dies in Ryo's arms.

Ryo swears revenge on Lan Di and asks locals for information. As he is about to run out of leads, a letter addressed to Ryo's father arrives from a Chinese man, Zhu Yuanda, suggesting he seek the aid of Master Chen, who works at Yokosuka Harbor. Through Chen and his son Guizhang, Ryo learns that the mirror taken by Lan Di is one of two. He locates the second, the phoenix mirror, in a hidden basement beneath the family dojo.

Chen reveals that Lan Di has left Japan for Hong Kong. Ryo borrows money to buy a boat ticket from a disreputable travel agency. When he goes to collect the ticket, he is ambushed by Chai, a member of Lan Di's criminal organization, the Chi You Men, who destroys his ticket. Ryo learns that the Chi You Men is connected to the local harbor gang, the Mad Angels, and takes a job at the harbor as a forklift driver to investigate. After he causes trouble, the Mad Angels kidnap his schoolfriend Nozomi. Ryo rescues her and makes a deal with the Mad Angels leader to beat up Guizhang in exchange for a meeting with Lan Di. Ryo realizes the deal is a trap and teams up with Guizhang to defeat the Mad Angels.

Ryo arranges to take a boat to Hong Kong with Guizhang. On the day of departure, they are attacked by Chai. Ryo defeats him, but Guizhang is injured and urges Ryo to go without him, saying he will meet him in China later. Chen advises Ryo to seek the help of a martial artist in Hong Kong named Lishao Tao. Ryo boards the boat and leaves for Hong Kong.

== Development ==
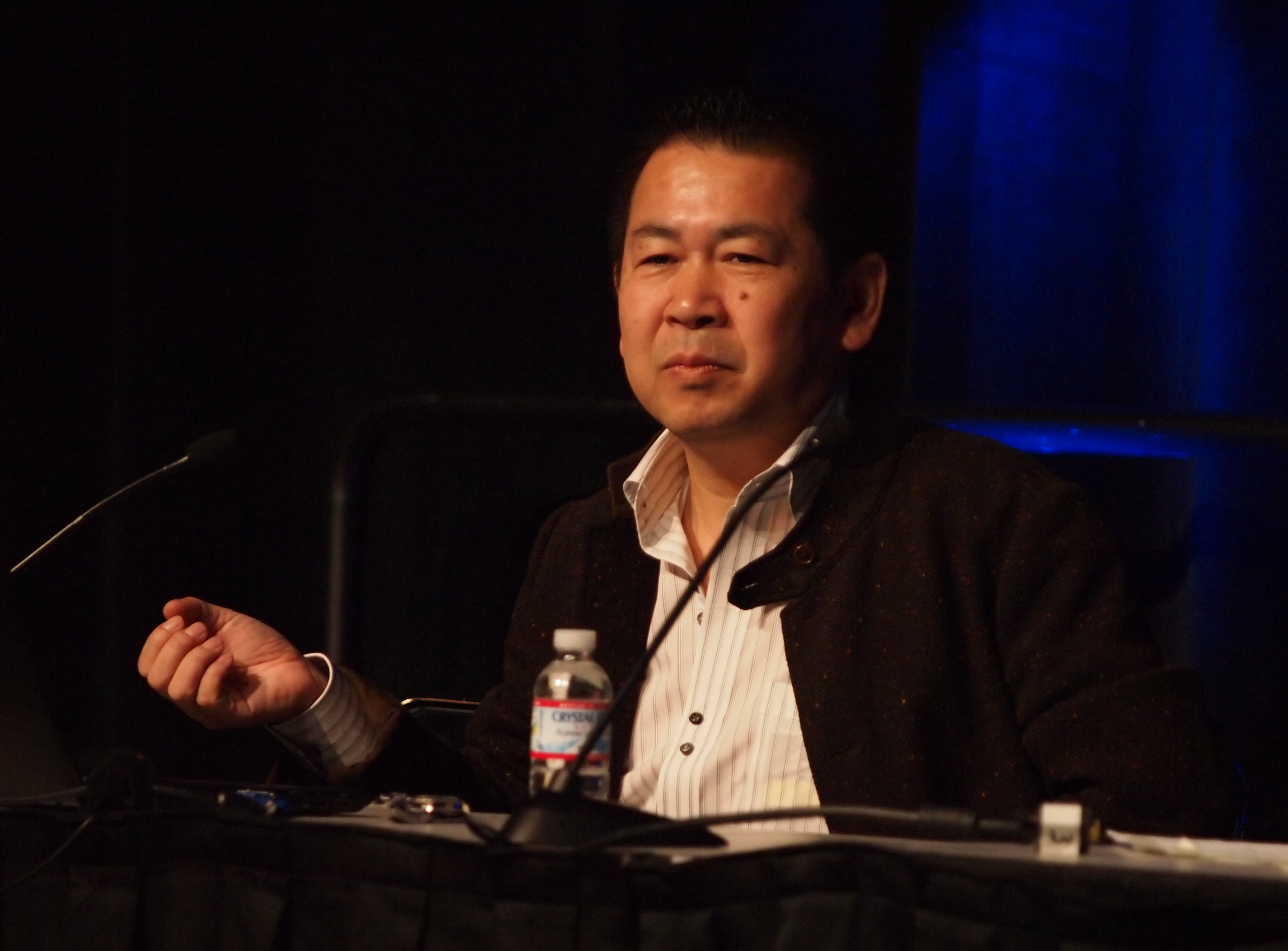
Shenmue creator Yu Suzuki

=== Sega Saturn prototypes ===
Shenmue was created by Yu Suzuki. After joining Sega in 1983, Suzuki created several successful arcade games including Hang-On (1985), Out Run (1986) and Virtua Fighter (1993). In comparison to arcade games, where the ideal experience is only a few minutes long, Suzuki wanted to make a longer experience and researched role-playing games (RPGs).

To test camera, combat and conversation systems, Suzuki and Sega AM2 built a prototype Sega Saturn game, The Old Man and the Peach Tree, about a young man, Taro, seeking a martial arts grandmaster in 1950s Luoyang, China. Taro brings an old man a peach in exchange for information about the grandmaster; at the end of the game, the man skillfully skips stones across water to hunt fish, revealing that he is the grandmaster.

In 1996, AM2 began developing a 3D Saturn RPG with the working title Guppy. This became Virtua Fighter RPG: Akira's Story, an RPG starring the Virtua Fighter character Akira. AM2 planned a "cinematic" approach, including voice acting and elaborate combat sequences. Suzuki researched locations in China, and constructed four acts with the themes "sadness", "fight", [sic] "departure" and "starting afresh". In this version of the story, Akira would overcome his grief following his father's death, travel to China, defeat an antagonist, and begin a journey with a new friend. Suzuki recruited a screenwriter, a playwright and film directors to write the multi-part story, which IGN described as a "revenge epic in the tradition of Chinese cinema".

=== Move to Dreamcast ===
Sega planned to release a graphics accelerator add-on to enable the game to run on Saturn. In 1997, after the add-on was canceled, development moved to Sega's upcoming console, the Dreamcast. In 1998, to better market the game as a Dreamcast "killer app", the Virtua Fighter connection was dropped and Suzuki announced the working title Project Berkley. By the time of the Dreamcast's release that November, it had been retitled Shenmue. Sega announced that Shenmue was so unique it belonged to a new genre it termed "full reactive eyes entertainment" or "FREE".

A screenshot of an early version of Shenmue for the Sega Saturn

AM2 focused on developing the game world, creating a large open environment with minigames and subquests. The setting is modeled on Dobuita in Yokosuka, Japan. The team worked with interior decorators to design more than 1,200 rooms and locations, and created over 300 characters, each with names, personalities and relationships, some modeled on Sega employees, with detailed clay models as animation references. Meteorological records of 1986 Yokosuka were used to create algorithmically generated weather and day-and-night cycles. The cut scenes are rendered in real time, without full-motion video (FMV), and motion capture was used to capture the movements of Budō (Japanese martial arts) experts. To fit the material onto a manageable number of discs, AM2 developed a new type of data compression.

In 1999, AM2 focused on fixing bugs, finding hundreds each day. At the time, there were no bug-tracking systems, so the team tracked bugs with Excel spreadsheets; at one point, they had tracked over 10,000 unresolved bugs. On one occasion, several non-player characters became trapped in the convenience store where they had gone as part of their scripted routines. Suzuki's solution was to widen the store's door. The product placement of the Coca-Cola and Timex brands also created problems, as the companies had strict specifications for their implementation. Suzuki said the biggest challenge was management, with over 300 staff and no experience of large projects.

According to the localizer, Jeremy Blaustein, Shenmue's English localization was fraught with problems exacerbated by the project's scale. At Suzuki's insistence, the English voices were recorded in Japan, which greatly restricted the casting. Blaustein said "we hired basically every single [English-speaking] person that exists [in Japan] and calls themselves a voice actor". The scripts were translated by several people, creating consistency problems, and arrived late, leaving no time for rewrites or proper direction.

Shenmue became the most expensive game ever developed at the time, reported to have cost Sega $70 million. In 2011, Suzuki said the figure was closer to $47 million including marketing. Development also covered some of Shenmue II (2001), which was completed for a smaller amount, and groundwork for future Shenmue games.

== Promotion and release ==
On November 27, 1998, Sega released the Dreamcast in Japan. The launch game Virtua Fighter 3tb, also directed by Suzuki, included a preview disc of Shenmue featuring FMV scenes and an interview with Suzuki, but no gameplay footage. On December 20, Sega unveiled Shenmue at a conference at the Yokohama International Assembly Hall and demonstrated its clock, weather and quick-time event systems; fans could watch the conference online. Initial reactions were positive, with Edge saying it "could be one of the most ambitious and important video game endeavours of the decade". However, the quick-time events angered some fans, who had assumed Shenmue would only use Virtua Fighter-style battles.

Sega announced a Japanese release date of April 1999, which was delayed to August 5. At the Tokyo Game Show that March, Sega announced that Shenmue would span multiple games and allowed the public to play it for the first time. At a Japanese consumer show on May 3, Sega demonstrated the facial animation and announced that non-player characters would have their own daily routines. Later that month, Sega showed Shenmue in America for the first time at the 1999 Game Developer's Conference. It was playable the following week at the E3 trade fair in Los Angeles.

At a Japanese consumer conference on June 1, 1999, Sega announced a Shenmue promotion to coincide with a Dreamcast price drop. Sega distributed a limited-edition video, What's Shenmue, with Dreamcast consoles and games, and a playable demo from August 1. The "spoof" demo has Ryo search a small area of Yokosuka for Sega's managing director, Hidekazu Yukawa. Sega also announced that Shenmue had been delayed to October 28. On June 22, Sega announced a "Shenmue subway tour", showing playable demos at Japanese train stations that August. NHK spent six months with the development team and broadcast a making-of documentary before the game's release.

At the end of September, Sega announced a release date for early 2000, before moving it to the final week of 1999. Sega released Shenmue on December 29, 1999, in Japan, November 7, 2000, in North America, and December 1, 2000, in Europe.

== Reception ==
=== Critical ===
Reception

Aggregate score
| Aggregator | Score |
|---|---|
| GameRankings | 89% |

Review scores
| Publication | Score |
|---|---|
| 1Up.com | A+ |
| 4Players | 95/100 |
| AllGame | 4/5 |
| Computer and Video Games | 5/5 |
| Edge | 8/10 |
| Electronic Gaming Monthly | 26/30 |
| Eurogamer | 9/10 |
| Famitsu | 8/10, 9/10, 8/10, 8/10 |
| Game Informer | 6/10 |
| GamePro | 4.5/5 |
| GameSpot | 7.8/10 (US); 8.1/10 (UK) |
| GameSpy | 8.5/10 |
| GameTrailers | 4.5/5 |
| Hyper | 94/100 |
| IGN | 9.7/10 |
| Jeuxvideo.com | 18/20 |
| Next Generation | 5/5 |
| DC-UK | 10/10 |
| Gaming Age | A− |
| Official Dreamcast Magazine (UK) | 10/10 |
| Official Dreamcast Magazine (US) | 10/10 |

Awards
| Publication | Award |
|---|---|
| Japan Media Arts Festival | Excellence Prize for Interactive Art |
| 5th Animation Kobe | Packaged Work Award |
| Edge | Graphical Achievement |
| 4th Annual Interactive Achievement Awards | Console Innovation |

Shenmue held an average aggregate score of 89% on GameRankings. Critics praised its graphics, realism, soundtrack and ambition. IGN called it "a gaming experience that no one, casual to hardcore gamer, can miss", and Eurogamer called it "one of the most compelling and unusual gaming experiences ever created". GameSpot wrote that though Shenmue is "far from perfect" it was "revolutionary" and "worth experiencing—provided you have the time to invest". Edge initially called the Japanese version a "landmark"; they later said the English version was not the "milestone" they had hoped for, but was "involving, and ultimately rewarding".

Ed Lomas of the UK Official Dreamcast Magazine said the production values were "astounding ... [Shenmue] is the most beautiful game ever made, no doubt about it." Though he acknowledged problems with controls, dated quick-time events, script and voice acting, he felt the experience as a whole was "incredible", particularly its immersion and the freedom to pursue the story at the player's pace. Jeff Lundrigan of Next Generation wrote: "Everyone on Earth owes it to themselves to play this. Some will enjoy it more than others, but no one will fail to recognize its magnificent production values and depth of design." According to the Guardian critic Keith Stuart, while many players rejected the "systemic and narrative oddities", fans enjoyed the "wooden voice acting and clipped dialogue" and found humor in it.

Several reviews criticized the invisible walls, abundance of cutscenes, English voice acting, and inability to progress without waiting for scheduled events. GameSpot wrote that by "the time you're driving forklifts and participating in the game's QTE-filled conclusion, hours upon hours of boredom will have taken their toll". Game Informer criticized the lack of action, writing: "Determining your character's next move requires little more than talking to someone, who will then tell you who to see or where to go ... All that's left is a guy walking around an amazingly detailed environment. If I wanted to experience that, I could see it in another game with proven endless entertainment value. It's called life."

=== Sales ===
Shenmue sold 260,000 copies in its first week of release in Japan. It eventually sold 1.2 million copies and became one of the Dreamcast's highest-selling games. However, its sales did not cover its development cost and analysts consider it a major commercial failure. USgamer wrote that though the sales would have been a success for most games, only an "impossible" number of sales would have seen Shenmue turn a profit. According to GamesRadar, every Dreamcast owner would have needed to buy Shenmue twice for it to turn a profit, and so "ironically it probably did as much to kill the Dreamcast as it did to cement its reputation". It contributed to Sega's exit from the console market following years of declining profits.

The Shenmue localizer, Jeremy Blaustein, likened the failure to the epic 1980 film Heaven's Gate, which went drastically over budget and was a commercial failure: "Suzuki was coming off of huge past successes, and he was the man. And so this was going be the thing ... And everyone wanted a piece of that $70 million, you know? And of course that's like the worst thing you could do, is to start out a project saying we've got all this money, and then just keep throwing more money at it." Peter Moore, the president of Sega of America at the time, said Shenmue sold "extremely well" but could not make a profit due to the Dreamcast's limited installed base. The Dreamcast engineer and future Sega president Hideki Sato defended Shenmue as an "investment [which] will someday be recouped" because the lessons learnt during development could be applied to other games.

=== Awards ===
Shenmue received the Excellence Prize for "Interactive Art" at the 2000 Japan Media Arts Festival. Edge awarded it for "Graphical Achievement", writing of the "breathtaking" detail of the character models and that never had there been "such a convincing representation of real life" in a video game. GameSpot named Shenmue the most disappointing console game of 2000, but awarded it the prize for "Best Graphics, Technical" for a console game, and nominated it for "Best Adventure Game", "Best Sound", and "Best Graphics, Artistic". During the 4th Annual Interactive Achievement Awards in March 2001, Shenmue received the "Console Innovation" award, along with nominations for "Game of the Year", "Console Game of the Year", "Character or Story Development", and "Game Design".

== Legacy ==
In 2009, the IGN Xbox editor Hilary Goldstein praised Shenmue for its "great ideas", but said it was "ultimately uninteresting". The editor of IGN Nintendo, Matt Casamassina, felt it was "more of a technical demo than a coherent game". However, the IGN UK writer Martin Robinson described it as "a deeply personal game" that "opened my eyes to a whole new world for video games, suggesting that they didn't have to be about shooting aliens in the face, rescuing the princess or slaying orcs for hours on end — they could be about real people in a real place ... It's the mundane moments that gave Shenmue its poetry."

If the Grand Theft Auto games have been vilified as crime simulators in which you can press a button to buy a hooker then run a hooker over with a car, Shenmue is a game where you can press a button to politely ask directions, then combo into cherishing your elders and always remembering to recycle. Instead of giving us a city to be tested and battered against in all directions, Shenmue builds you a world and asks you to follow the rules rather than break them.

— Brendan Main, The Escapist, December 21, 2010

In 2011, Empire wrote that "the digital environment created by Shenmue was revolutionary at the time ... Even by today's standards, its rich and affectionate vision of urban Japan is inspiring." In his 2010 book 1001 Video Games You Must Play Before You Die, David McCarthy wrote of Shenmue's "paradigmatic impact on the entire video game industry". According to McCarthy, while it appears "crude and blocky" compared to modern games, Shenmue "recreated the real world with ... attention to detail that has never been rivaled". In a 2014 retrospective, Edge wrote that "some were entranced by the game's abounding atmosphere and visual detail. Others left frozen by clumpy interaction with an unthreatening, almost rustic world ... where they'd wander the districts of Yokosuka while asking unusual questions to pensioners and hairdressers." In the same year, The Guardian wrote: "[Shenmue's] pacing might be glacial compared to the rollercoaster tempo of Uncharted, but slowing things down allows for a greater appreciation of everything that Suzuki and Sega's AM2 department achieved here ... How everything is held together remains quite exquisite, under the closest scrutiny, even by 2014 standards."

Reviews of the HD ports of Shenmue in 2018 were less positive. Destructoid's Peter Glagowski wrote that Shenmue had "interesting concepts that are marred by poor execution", and criticized the combat and slow pacing. He concluded: "This open-world design was truly original and fascinating in 1999, but there really wasn't a need to include half of the features that Shenmue has." The Escapist critic Yahtzee Croshaw disliked the "relentless" and "frenetic" combat, and felt that the open world lacked content between key story moments. The critic James Stephanie Sterling wrote that "Shenmue is dreadful [...] Maybe at the turn of the millennium when this game was worth a shit it could get away with being bold, but boldness is no excuse for wasting the player's time, having absolutely no respect for the audience or its patience, and generally expecting people to make their own fun in a game that doesn't really give all that many tools to have fun with."

Shenmue attracted a cult following. Fans visit Dobuita Street in Yokosuka, where most of the game is set. It has been included in several lists of the greatest games of all time. In 2007, Edge named it the 50th-greatest game, and in 2008 it was voted the 25th-greatest in Game's reader poll of more than 100,000 votes. In 2008, IGN readers voted Shenmue the 81st-greatest game. In April 2011, Empire ranked it the 42nd-best game. In April 2013, Den of Geek ranked Shenmue and Shenmue II the joint-best Dreamcast games. That September, readers of the German games magazine M! Games voted Shenmue the best game of all time, and in October MSN UK named it one of the 20 best. In 2014, Shenmue was named the 71st-best by Slant Magazine and the seventh by Empire.

Shenmue is credited for pioneering several game technologies. In its list of "top five underappreciated innovators", 1UP.com credited Shenmue as the original "open-world city game" before games such as Grand Theft Auto III (2001). Its large environments, wealth of options and level of detail have been compared to later sandbox games including Grand Theft Auto, Yakuza, Fallout 3, and Deadly Premonition. Shenmue is also credited for naming and popularizing the quick-time event, which later games including Resident Evil, God of War and Tomb Raider incorporated. In a public poll held by the British Academy of Film and Television Arts in 2025, Shenmue was voted the most influential game of all time.

== Sequels ==
Suzuki planned Shenmue to cover several games. Sega planned to continue the series to recoup its investment. Shenmue II, developed simultaneously with Shenmue and completed for "a much more reasonable sum", was released in 2001 in Japan and Europe and 2002 in North America but sold poorly. In 2004, Sega announced a massively multiplayer online role-playing game for PC, Shenmue Online. It was canceled in 2007. In December 2010, Sega launched Shenmue City, a social game for the Mobage mobile service in Japan. It was shut down in December 2011.

In September 2011, Suzuki left Sega to focus on his development studio Ys Net. At the E3 conference on June 15, 2015, he announced a Kickstarter crowdfunding campaign to develop Shenmue III with Ys Net for PlayStation 4 and Windows having licensed the rights from Sega. The campaign reached its initial $2 million goal in just under nine hours. On July 17, 2015, Shenmue III became the fastest-funded and highest-funded video game project in Kickstarter history, raising $6.3 million in total. It was released on November 19, 2019.

== Ports ==
Sega created ports of Shenmue for PlayStation 2 and Xbox, but these went unreleased. The programmer Makoto Wada said this was due to problems with the product placement contract, which only covered the Dreamcast version. Sega canceled a remake of Shenmue and Shenmue II in 2017 due to technical problems.

On August 21, 2018, Sega released high-definition ports of Shenmue and Shenmue II for PlayStation 4, Windows and Xbox One. The ports were developed by the British studio D3T, and include new graphics and control options, improved user interfaces, and Japanese and English voices. Some details, such as the product placement, were omitted, and cutscenes were presented in their original aspect ratio due to technical limitations.

The ports were released in Japan on November 22, 2018, and debuted at number four on the Japanese charts with 37,529 retail sales on PlayStation 4. They remained among the top 20 bestselling games in Japan until December 2, 2018, having sold almost 45,000 copies. IGN reported numerous bugs affecting graphics, cutscenes, controls and saved games. Eigo Kasahara, the planning director of the original Shenmue, expressed frustration and said he had urged D3T to fix the problems. In 2021, a fan project to remake Shenmue based on the 2018 ports using Unreal Engine 4 was announced.

== Other media ==
Sega released a soundtrack album, Shenmue Orchestra Version, on April 1, 1999. A two-disc soundtrack album, Shenmue OST Chapter 1: Yokosuka, was released on March 23, 2000. Data Discs also released a vinyl edition. A compilation of Shenmue's cutscenes, Shenmue: The Movie, was released theatrically in Japan in 2001 and packaged with the Xbox version of Shenmue II. An anime adaptation of Shenmue premiered on February 6, 2022.
