= Sega Race TV =

2008 video game

- Developer: Sega AM Plus
- Publisher: Sega
- Designer: Yu Suzuki
- Platform: Arcade
- Release: JP: February 19, 2008; NA: July 4, 2008; EU: March 13, 2009
- Genre: Racing
- Mode: Single-player
- Arcade system: Sega Lindbergh

Sega Race TV is a racing game for the Sega Lindbergh arcade system board. It was released on February 19, 2008, in Japan, July 4, 2008, in the US and on March 13, 2009, in Europe.

== Featured cars ==
The eight cars featured in the game are Ford Mustang GT, Chevrolet Camaro Concept, Chevrolet Corvette C3 Stingray, Plymouth HEMI Cuda, Mazda MX-5, Mitsubishi Eclipse, Ruf RK Roadster, Plymouth Prowler and Mercury Convertible, all exist in convertible forms. All can be customized, and customized cars can be obtained through passwords in an arcade cabinet.

== Development ==
This was the only game Yu Suzuki was successfully able to complete after his departure from Sega AM2, the other two projects that he worked on Psy-Phi and Shenmue Online were never released.

Sega Race TV was Suzuki's last game with Sega, after which he established his own studio YS.NET and subsequently retired from the company.
