= Babel II =

Media franchise

- Cover of Babel II volume 1 as published by Akita Shoten

バビル2世 (Babiru Ni-sei)
- Manga
- Written by: Mitsuteru Yokoyama
- Published by: Akita Shoten
- Magazine: Weekly Shōnen Champion
- Original run: July 1971 – May 1973
- Volumes: 12
- Anime television series
- Directed by: Kozo Morishita
- Written by: Shun'ichi Yukimuro; Masaki Tsuji
- Music by: Shunsuke Kikuchi
- Studio: Toei Animation
- Original network: ANN (NET)
- Original run: January 1, 1973 – September 24, 1973
- Episodes: 39
- Manga

His Name Is 101
- Written by: Mitsuteru Yokoyama
- Published by: Akita Shoten
- Magazine: Monthly Shōnen Champion
- Original run: 1977 – 1979
- Volumes: 5
- Original video animation
- Directed by: Yoshihisa Matsumoto
- Produced by: Hiroshi Ichinohe; Hiroyuki Yonemasu; Norihisa Abe
- Written by: Masashi Namiki
- Music by: Katsunori Ishida & Takayoshi Hirano (Japanese); Dave Tolley (international dubs)
- Studio: J.C.Staff
- Licensed by: NA: Discotek Media
- Released: March 21, 1992 ― October 10, 1992
- Runtime: 30 minutes (each)
- Episodes: 4
- Anime television series

Babel II: Beyond Infinity
- Directed by: Takeshi Ushigusa
- Written by: Takahiko Masuda
- Music by: Tetsuya Komuro
- Studio: Vega Entertainment
- Original network: TV Tokyo
- Original run: October 6, 2001 – December 29, 2001
- Episodes: 13
- Manga

Babel II: The Returner
- Written by: Takashi Noguchi
- Published by: Akita Shoten
- Magazine: Young Champion
- Published: February 23, 2010 – 2017
- Volumes: 17

Babel II (Japanese: バビル2世, Hepburn: Babiru Ni-sei) is a Japanese 1971 manga series by Mitsuteru Yokoyama. It was translated into an animated format in 1973 as a television series, in 1992 as an original video animation series and in 2001 as a thirteen-episode television series. Yokoyama's sequel to the series, set in a parallel universe, is entitled His Name Is 101 (その名は101, Sono Na wa Wan-Zero-Wan).

== Plot ==
The series follows Koichi, a Japanese schoolboy, who learns that he is the reincarnation of the alien entity, Babel. As such, Koichi is entrusted with Babel's powers and joined by three protectors: Rodem, a shape-shifting black panther; Ropross, a pterodactyl-like flying creature; and Poseidon, a giant robot that always rises from the depth of the ocean when summoned. The boy hero commands his newfound powers and companions in order to defend the Earth.

== Babel II (manga) ==
=== Characters ===
Babel II
The main character's real name is Koichi Yamano (his family name differs by version, including Furumi, Yamano, and Kamiya). Koichi lives an ordinary junior high schooler's life, until one day when the computer of the Tower of Babel authorizes him as a master of the tower. Koichi is actually a distant descendant of the space alien Babel, who was cast ashore on Earth 5000 years ago and who tricked the people of Earth into building the legendary tower to signal to his friends where he had landed, only for one of the tower's computers to malfunction and explode, destroying the entire structure. Koichi inherits Babel's superhuman intellect, physical strength and other various supernatural powers. He leaves the Tower of Babel with three servants following him; with their help, he confronts Yomi for disturbing the world's peace.
Yomi
Yomi is a vicious monarch who conspires to rule over the world. He is a distant descendant of Babel and has supernatural power equivalent to that of Babel II. He owns secret bases across the world and is accompanied by miscellaneous subordinates, including scientists, engineers, psychics, and cyborg agents. Because Yomi sends remodeled men to each country as VIPs in the government, he can manipulate many nations at will. He produces various robot weapons to counter Babel II's three servants and challenges him to a fight. He had been invited to the Tower of Babel as a candidate for heir-apparent of the tower before. Since the computer judged that he did not suit as successor, however, this memory was erased from him. Yomi is known to command combat robots called Baran that use iron ball-and-chain maces as weapons.
Yumiko Furumi
Yumiko is a daughter of Dr. Furumi and a classmate in Koichi's junior high school. In the anime version (1973), she is Koichi's cousin, and since Koichi lost his parents when he was young, Dr. Furumi took him in.
Igarashi
Igarashi is a head of the National Security Bureau and a supporter of Babel II.
Igano
Igano is a skilled investigator for the National Security Bureau.

=== Three servants ===
Rodem
Rodem is an intelligent living being of indeterminate form. It can transform itself into various forms, but prefers a black panther's figure. It also often chooses a female figure.
Ropross
Ropross is a huge robot in the form of a pterodactyl. It can fly in the sky at supersonic speed and has a rocket launcher and the Supersonic Wave Generator in its mouth.
Poseidon
Poseidon is a giant humanoid robot. It has a laser gun in one finger and a torpedo launcher in its abdomen. Poseidon shows its abilities most in the sea, but it can be active and powerful on the land as well.

== Sono Na wa 101 (manga) ==
=== Plot ===
There is a boy called registration number "101" (one-zero-one) in a secret laboratory which is administered by the CIA. The boy is Koichi Yamano, who was once called Babel II and saved the world. Koichi discovers that his blood has the ability to save lives, and he provides the laboratory with his blood after fighting with Yomi.

He later notices that the laboratory transfused his blood into subjects and produced supermen like him artificially. He escapes from the lab and decides to exterminate the supermen produced by his blood that are scattered all over the world.

As a result, the enemy sends espers to fight him one after another, but the three servants of Babel II, Rodem, Ropross, and Poseidon are confined in an underground nuclear test site by the CIA, so Koichi is forced to fight alone.

A sequel to this series, called Babel II: The Returner, has Babel once again fighting despite many years passing since his capture. Here, Ropross and Poseidon have received powerful upgrades and the entire USA has declared war on Babel. It is even revealed that Yomi has recovered from his battles and joins the war.

== Anime television (1973) ==
=== Cast ===
Character	Japanese voice actor
Koichi Furumi/Babel II	Akira Kamiya
Babel I	
Lodem (Black Panther)	Keiichi Noda
Lodem (Woman type)	Nana Yamaguchi
The computer of the Tower of Babel	Kōji Yada
Yumiko Furumi	Michiko Nomura
Furumi (Yumiko's father)	Yonehiko Kitagawa
Furumi (Yumiko's mother)	Akiko Tsuboi
Yomi	Chikao Ohtsuka
Taro Watari	Shingo Kanematsu
Yuki Watari	Tamaki Taura
Chii-bou	Keiko Yamamoto

== Original video animation (1992) ==
Helen McCarthy in 500 Essential Anime Movies stated that "this compressed version leaves some holes in the story, but the original concept is strong, and the animation is crisp". Streamline Pictures released this OVA on dubbed VHS in the 90s. Image Entertainment put this version of the anime on DVD in 2001. Discotek Media released the title in 2017.

=== Cast ===
Character	Japanese voice actor	English voice actor
Koichi Yamano/Babel II	Takeshi Kusao	Steve Bulen
Babel I	Hiroshi Naka	Steve Kramer
Emperor Yomi	Akio Otsuka	Michael McConnohie
Juju	Kotono Mitsuishi	Mari Devon
Wang	Shinichi Ishihara	Kerrigan Mahan
Yuka	Ai Orikasa	Wendee Lee
Yamazaki	Ikuya Sawaki	Jeff Winkless
Hammer	Kōji Tsujitani	Dan Woren
Nicola	Toshihiko Seki	Kirk Thornton
LaShelle	Kumiko Watanabe	Juliana Donald
Leah	Kumiko Nishihara	Lara Cody
Griffin	Toshiyuki Morikawa	
Psychists	Wataru Takagi, Masaki Aizawa, Hikaru Midorikawa	

== Beyond Infinity (2001) ==
Media Blasters released this show on DVD.

=== Cast ===
Character	Japanese voice actor	English voice actor
Koichi Kamiya/Babel II	Kenichi Suzumura	Dave Wittenberg
Babel I	Hiroya Ishimaru	Lex Lang
Lodem	Kenyu Horiuchi	Lex Lang
Yumiko Furumi	Shōko Kikuchi	Michelle Ruff
Reika Saeki	Satsuki Yukino	Julie Ann Taylor
Yomi	Mugihito	Abe Lasser
Hikari Homura/Leon	Showtaro Morikubo	Dave Mallow
Hikari Homura (child)	Masayuki Kimura	Brianne Siddall
Ryoko Kirishima	Yurika Hino	Karen Strassman

== Legacy ==
Japanese manga artist Hirohiko Araki said that he paid homage to Babel II by letting Jotaro Kujo wear a Japanese school uniform in Part 3 (1989–1992) of the JoJo's Bizarre Adventure manga series.

Video game developer Yu Suzuki of Sega said that Babel II was his main inspiration in the creation of the arcade fighting game Psy-Phi.

The music video for the Michael and Janet Jackson song "Scream" (1995) features clips from Babel II.
