= Burning Rival =

1993 video game

- Japanese Burning Rival candy cabinet marquee
- Developer: Sega AM2
- Publisher: Sega
- Producer: Yu Suzuki
- Designer: Issei Tokuda
- Programmer: Yasushi Nakajima
- Composer: Hideaki Miyamoto
- Platform: Arcade
- Release: July 1993
- Genre: Fighting
- Mode: Up to 2 players simultaneously
- Arcade system: Sega System 32 hardware

Burning Rival (バーニングライバル) is a 1993 fighting arcade game developed by Sega AM2 and published by Sega. It was released exclusively in Japan in July 1993. It was also the first fighting game developed by Sega AM2. Virtua Fighter and Shenmue creator Yu Suzuki was involved as a producer. It is noted for its distinct 2D graphics and animations, developed by Zero-One. It was created during the fighting game trend of the 1990s that was popularized by Capcom's Street Fighter II.

== Plot ==
The game takes place in "Destiny City", a metropolis seemingly located near real-world Saskatoon, Saskatchewan. Once every few years, strong fighters gather here and hold a violent, secret no-holds-barred fighting spree. This year, too, a group of extraordinary fighters gathered, sick of fighting by the rules. Some coveted the titled of "World's Strongest", while others dreamt of acquiring vast wealth. Things in Destiny City heated up before the tournament began.

== Gameplay ==
Burning Rival gameplay screenshot

In Burning Rival, the player engages opponents in one-on-one close quarter combat in a series of best-two-out-of-three matches. The objective of each round is to deplete the opponent's vitality before the timer runs out. If both opponents knock each other out at the same time or the timer runs out with both fighters having an equal amount of vitality left, then a "double KO" or "draw game" is declared and additional rounds will be played until sudden death. If there is no clear winner by the end of the final round, then either the computer-controlled opponent will win by default in a single-player match or both fighters will lose in a 2-player match. Unlike the Street Fighter franchise and some other fighting games and franchises, there are no bonus rounds added to the game.

Like most fighting games at the time, the game's controls use a configuration of an eight-directional joystick and six attack buttons. The player uses the joystick to jump, crouch and move the character towards or away from the opponent, as well as to guard the character from an opponent's attacks. There are three punch buttons and three kick buttons of differing strength and speed (Light, Medium and Heavy). The player can perform a variety of basic moves in any position, including grabbing/throwing attacks. The player can perform special moves by inputting a combination of directional and button-based commands.

== Characters ==
There are eight playable characters, and one boss. Their voices were recorded at the Power House Studio.

- Arnold (アーノルド) (voice actor: Francis Silva) - the lead character of the game. An orphaned karate student, he travels the country training, still in mourning for his master, whom he accidentally killed.
- Craze (クレーズ) (voice actor: Susumu Kimura) - the best street fighter in the whole city. Bored with street fighting day after day, he's come to test his strength.
- Asuka (飛鳥 （あすか）) (voice actor: Haruka Itoh) - a modern-day female ninja, she wanders the world trying to find her older brother who disappeared while he was training.
- Santana (サンタナ) (voice actor: Greg Irwin) - a luchador nicknamed "The Fiery Wind of Mexico", his goal is to use the prize money to help his little sister, who suffers from a grave illness.
- Jackson (ジャクスン) (voice actor: Toshihiro Nagoshi) - the current kickboxing champion, he uses Muay Thai and finishes off his opponents by incapacitating them.
- Bill (ビル) (voice actor: Takenobu Mitsuyoshi) - a bodyguard for a secret organization, he entered the tournament for his beloved family, counting on the strength he gained playing football to see him through.
- Mr. Chin (ミスター陳 (Mr. 陳)) (voice actor: Takehito Tsumagari) - a kung fu master who owns a ramen shop, he entered the tournament to win the prize money and use it to expand his shop.
- Shingen (真幻 (しんげん)) (voice actor: Yasuhiro Takagi) - the spirit of a dead warrior, he is shrouded in mystery. The answer to where he came from and why he participated at the tournament is unknown. He appears again as the boss known as Ghost Shingen.
