= Virtua Fighter 3 =

1996 video game

- Arcade flyer depicting character Dural
- Developer: Sega AM2 (Note: Ported to Dreamcast by Genki.)
- Publisher: Sega
- Directors: Yu Suzuki; Daichi Katagiri
- Producer: Yu Suzuki
- Programmer: Tetsuya Kaku
- Artist: Kazuhiro Izaki
- Composers: Takenobu Mitsuyoshi; Fumio Ito; Hidenori Shoji
- Series: Virtua Fighter
- Platforms: Arcade, Dreamcast
- Release: Arcade; July 26, 1996 (location test); September 1996; September 1997 (3tb); November 28, 2023 (3tb Online); Dreamcast (3tb): JP: November 27, 1998; EU: October 14, 1999; NA: October 18, 1999
- Genre: Fighting
- Modes: Single-player, multiplayer
- Arcade system: Model3 Step1.0

Virtua Fighter 3 (Note: Japanese: バーチャファイター3, Hepburn: Bācha Faitā Surī) is a 1996 fighting video game developed and published by Sega, the sequel to 1994's Virtua Fighter 2 as part of the Virtua Fighter series. Released originally in arcades, Virtua Fighter 3 was the first arcade game to run on the Sega Model 3 system board. The use of this new hardware gave the game revolutionary graphics for its time. Two new characters were added to the roster: Aoi and Taka-Arashi, both of whom are oriented around traditional Japanese martial arts.

Like its predecessors, Virtua Fighter 3 was a major hit in arcades, selling 30,000 arcade cabinets worldwide. In Japan, it was the fourth highest-grossing arcade game of 1996 and the overall highest-grossing arcade game of 1997. A port for the Sega Saturn was announced but ultimately cancelled. However, an updated version named Virtua Fighter 3tb, which added team battles, was ported to the Dreamcast home console in 1998.

== Gameplay ==
Gameplay screenshot (Team Battle version)

This iteration is the first in the series to have undulation in the stages, such as a staircase in the Great Wall stage, a stage set on top of a sloping roof and a raft constructed of individually moving elements on a bobbing water surface.

A fourth button, the Dodge, was added (the series had previously used only three - Kick, Punch and Guard). Pressing the button with the joystick in neutral or held up makes the character move into the screen (i.e. away from the viewer), while pressing the button with the joystick held down makes the character move out of the screen (i.e. towards the viewer). This 'evasion' technique enables players to dodge incoming attacks, creating opportunities to counter-attack almost immediately.

== Characters ==
Returning characters are: Akira Yuki, Pai Chan, Lau Chan, Wolf Hawkfield, Jeffry McWild, Kage-Maru, Sarah Bryant, Jacky Bryant, Shun Di, Lion Rafale and Dural. Two new Japanese characters were added to the roster of fighters: Aoi Umenokoji, a beautiful Japanese woman and a childhood friend of Akira Yuki who used a nimble form of aiki-jujutsu as her fighting style of choice, and Taka-Arashi, a sumo wrestler from Japan.

Taka Arashi would not make another appearance in the Virtua Fighter series until Virtua Fighter 5 R; the series' producer Hiroshi Kataoka explained that the removal of Taka in subsequent installments was due to the technical implications of having a substantially larger character. Taka had in fact nearly been cut from Virtua Fighter 3 due to difficulties with his jumping moves.

== Plot ==
Judgement 6, an organization seeking global domination, are hosting a third fighting tournament. The fighters all enter to achieve their personal goals. Some wish to challenge Judgement 6 and uncover the group's secrets. Kage-Maru wins the tournament.

== Development and release ==
Virtua Fighter 3 was the launch title for the arcade board Model 3 from Sega. Developed by Yu Suzuki's Sega AM2, it was a revolutionary game from a technical standpoint, with its detailed graphics earning widespread praise. Characters' eyes appeared to track the opponent's position, their muscles could flex and relax, and the fighting arenas featured stairs and slopes. The game also introduced the ability to move in three dimensions to the series with the dodge move, a feature that was apparently added fairly late in development, as Suzuki said in an interview held during the third quarter of 1995: "The fact that the game is 2D from the player's perspective probably won't change in VF3. If the viewpoint changes rapidly during gameplay, the player can't concentrate on the game, and it's difficult to keep up with the situation your character is in, as in [Battle Arena Toshinden]." In addition, he stated later in the same interview that he intended to keep Virtua Fighter 3 a three-button game like its predecessors.

The game was unveiled at Tokyo's AOU show in February 1996. Sega displayed non-playable demos of Lau Chan, Dural, and new character Aoi Umenokoji, who was unveiled for the first time at the show. However, Dural, the robotic final boss, garnered the most attention, due to being made of a metallic surface that reflected the surrounding environment. A playable demo with just two characters, Jacky Bryant and Dural, was shown to a select handful of individuals at the show. Computer and Video Games described the game's demo, also shown at Miami's ACME show in early March 1996, as "the most astounding display of video game graphic muscle ever in the history of this industry." According to Next Generation magazine, Virtua Fighter 3 "stunned the crowd" and "stole the show hands down."

Yu Suzuki said the added characters, Aoi and Taka-Arashi, were inspired in part by a desire to introduce traditional Japanese martial arts to the Virtua Fighter series, which had previously been dominated by Chinese martial arts.

In an interview published in July 1996, members of Sega AM2's sound team explained that the music for Virtua Fighter 3 was being composed to reflect the atmosphere of individual stages rather than primarily focusing on character themes, as in previous instalments. The team also described an internally developed Macintosh-based tool called "Sound Factory", which facilitated the editing and conversion of sound data across Sega's arcade and home console hardware, streamlining the production process.

During the game's beta testing at the Sega Joyopolis Arcade in Tokyo, players waited in line six to eight hours for one round of combat. By this time the development was focused on fine-tuning the timing of the moves and sensitivity of the buttons.

In Australia, a competitive tournament for Virtua Fighter 3 was held at Sega World Sydney on 11 October 1997. The event brought together approximately 20 Australian competitors and visiting Japanese players.

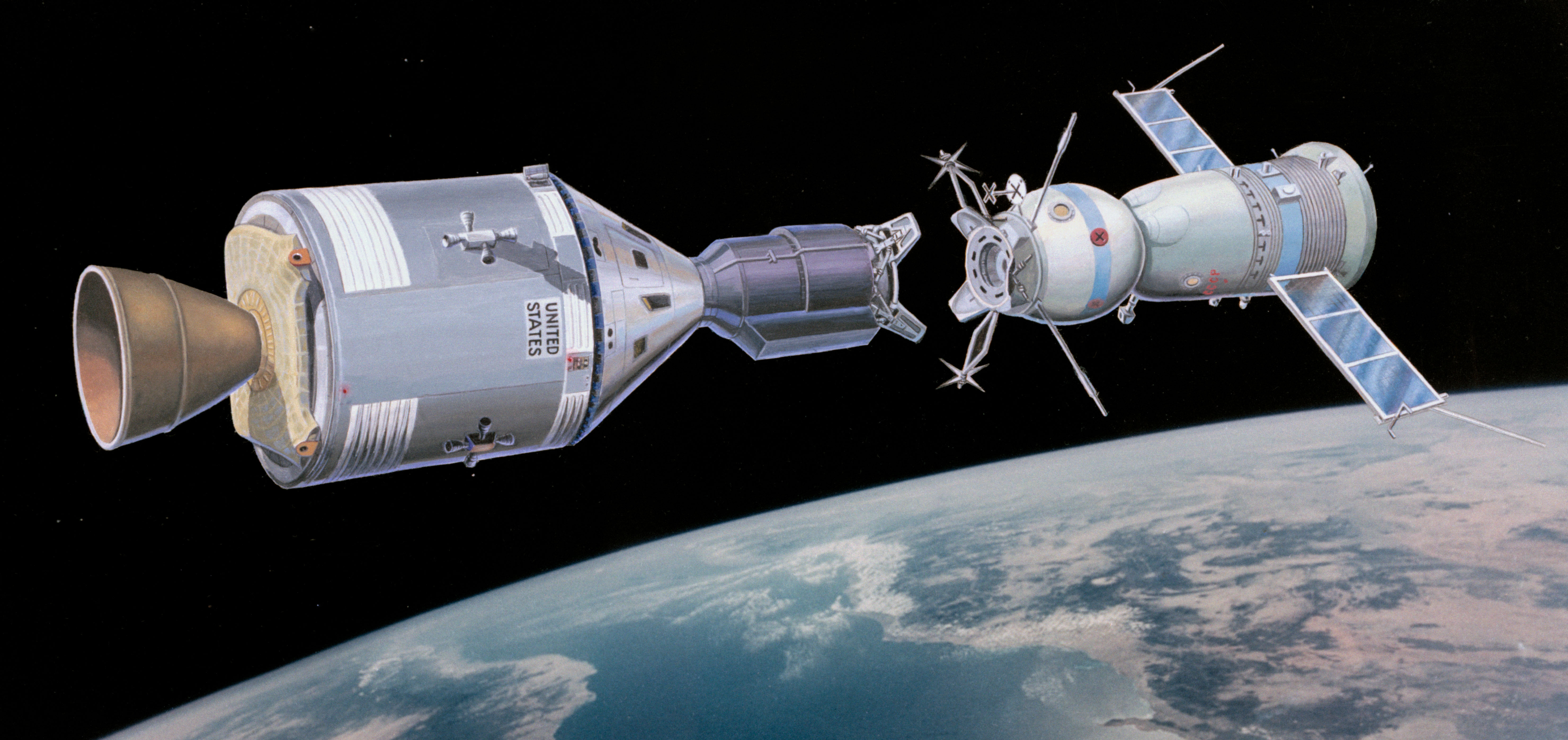
The Real3D chipset traces back to the docking simulations of the Apollo program.

Yu Suzuki announced a Sega Saturn port at a late 1996 press conference (the same conference at which Fighters Megamix was unveiled), elaborating that AM2 research had been studying Virtua Fighter 3 for the past few months and had at last determined that it was possible to create a Saturn port comparable to the arcade version. To facilitate the conversion, AM2's Research and Development labs spent some months working on a 3D accelerator cartridge for the Saturn, but the cartridge was canceled for undisclosed reasons. Sega officials nonetheless stated that Virtua Fighter 3 would be ported to the Saturn with or without the upgrade cartridge. According to insiders, this cartridge was being designed by Lockheed Martin Corporation and based on the same Real3D chipset used in their upcoming 3D accelerator card for PCs that was being done in collaboration with Silicon Graphics and Intel (and based on years of experience on the docking simulations of the Apollo CSM with NASA). Staff from Core Design claimed to have seen the completed 3D accelerator cartridge in action during an early 1997 visit to Sega of Japan, running a demo of the Saturn version of Virtua Fighter 3 with two playable characters.

=== Virtua Fighter 3tb ===
Virtua Fighter 3tb is an updated version of Virtua Fighter 3 that features battles between teams of various fighters (the "tb" stands for "team battle"), who fight each other one at a time, as well new moves and other tweaks. This "team battle" version was later released on Sega's Dreamcast console, being one of its launch games, becoming one of the best-selling Dreamcast games in Japan. It was intended to be a launch title for the Dreamcast in North America, but was delayed. An online arcade version of 3tb was released in 2023. Virtua Fighter 3tb is playable at in-game arcades in the 2024 video game Like a Dragon: Infinite Wealth. as well as in the 2025 release Like a Dragon: Pirate Yakuza in Hawaii.

== Reception ==
Reception

Aggregate score
Aggregator	Score
GameRankings	79% (DC)

Review scores
Publication	Score
AllGame	4.5/5 (ARC); 4.5/5 (DC)
Edge	8/10 (DC)
Electronic Gaming Monthly	9/10 (ARC)
Famitsu	36/40 (DC)
GameSpot	8.2/10 (DC)
IGN	8.7/10 (DC)
Next Generation	5/5 (ARC); 4/5 (DC)
Consoles +	96% (DC)
DC-UK	9/10 (DC)
Dreamcast Magazine	30/30 (DC)
Video Games	5/5 (DC)

Awards
Publication	Award
5th GameFan Megawards (1996)	Coin-Op Game of the Year
10th Gamest Awards (1996)	Best Graphics (1st), Game of the Year (4th), Best Fighting Game (5th)
Edge (1998)	Graphical Achievement

=== Arcade ===
In Japan, Game Machine listed Virtua Fighter 3 on their October 15, 1996 issue as being the most-successful dedicated arcade game of the month. It went on to become Japan's fourth highest-grossing arcade game of 1996, and then Japan's overall highest-grossing arcade game of 1997. Game Machine also listed Virtua Fighter 3tb on their November 15, 1997 issue as being the fifth most-successful dedicated arcade game of the month. In North America, Virtua Fighter 3 had a successful launch in September 1996, drawing large crowds at the Amusement & Music Operators Association (AMOA) show, where it was the most anticipated game. Worldwide, the game sold 30,000 arcade cabinets by 1997, including 18,000 in Japan and 12,000 overseas. It was more successful than Namco's rival Tekken 3 (1997) in Japan, although Tekken 3 was more successful worldwide.

Virtua Fighter 3 received positive reviews from critics. Computer and Video Games reviewed the arcade version in its November 1996 issue and declared that it "is the best 3D fighting game ever." Sushi-X of Electronic Gaming Monthly felt that the traditional fighting styles represented by the two new characters were both executed very well. He said that both the graphics and the combat innovations fully lived up to the high expectations for the Model 3 board, though he was somewhat disappointed that the game did not significantly diverge from the style of Virtua Fighter 2. Bruised Lee of GamePro considered this a critical problem, summarizing that "VF3's graphics showcase an awesome level of visual realism never before seen in any game, but too many recycled Virtua Fighter 2 features keep VF3 from being a true masterpiece." He particularly cited the small number of new moves for the returning characters. A Next Generation critic instead described the game as "uniquely engrossing and technologically advanced in every way, from its gameplay, to its graphics, backgrounds, characters, and sound effects." He opined that the two new characters were not interesting enough to attract newcomers to the series, but had depth, playability, and uniqueness on par with the well-regarded returning cast. He also concluded the usage of the dodge button and opponent tracking "makes VF3 the first game to full realize 3D gameplay."

AllGame's Brett Alan Weiss reviewed the arcade version and scored it 4.5 out of 5 stars, concluding that it is a "deep game with a cinematic look and virtually limitless replay value". The 5th GameFan Megawards of 1996 gave Virtua Fighter 3 the award for Coin-Op Game of the Year. It also won the 1996 Spotlight Award for Best Arcade Game and was a runner-up for Electronic Gaming Monthly's Arcade Game of the Year, behind Street Fighter Alpha 2. The 10th Gamest Awards gave it the award for Best Graphics of 1996, and it placed fourth place for overall Game of the Year and fifth place for Best Fighting Game.

In the arcades, the game was very successful, to the point where the profits from this game and Virtua Fighter 4 helped recoup the losses Sega received from the commercial failure of Shenmue. It hit the top of the arcade charts in Japan upon release, despite initially appearing almost solely in arcades owned by Sega itself, due to the cabinet's high price.

=== Dreamcast ===
Virtua Fighter 3tb for the Dreamcast sold 330,631 units in Japan and 96,390 units in the United States, for a combined 427,021 units sold in Japan and the United States.

Edge reviewed the Dreamcast version and gave it an 8/10, stating "Bouts take place atop sloping downtown rooftops and on flights of steps, in the lapping waters of a desert island and on the Great Wall of China...But Virtua Fighter has grown into a highly technical game since the inception of the series in 1993, resulting in the uneven floors of the third game affecting the movement and attacks of the characters...Where once Tekken's approachable 'one button for each limb' system seemed the way forward for the genre, it limits interaction in a true three-dimensional space. VF's alternative, with buttons for punch, kick, defend and dodge, while perhaps not offering the same scope for multiple attack movements, allows you to control the characters with unrivalled grace." GameSpot's James Mielke praised the Dreamcast version, awarding it 8.2/10, saying "Virtua Fighter fans will find all they need neatly wrapped in this package". Allgame's Cal Nguyen, however, compared the Dreamcast version unfavorably with Soul Calibur.

Jeff Lundrigan reviewed the Dreamcast version of Virtua Fighter 3tb for Next Generation, rating it four stars out of five, and stated: "A peek beneath the exterior shows that it's still got all the right moves – the question is, will you look?"

In a 2019 retrospective, German magazine MAN!AC ranked Virtua Fighter 3tb 12th among its 25 best Dreamcast games. While praising its gameplay innovations, including stages with varying elevations and the dedicated dodge button, the publication criticised the European version's PAL conversion as poorly handled.
