= Steel Paws =

2025 video game

- Developer: YS Net
- Publisher: Namco Bandai (Android/iOS)
- Director: Yu Suzuki
- Producer: Yu Suzuki
- Platforms: iOS; Android
- Release: March 25, 2025
- Genre: Action role-playing
- Mode: Single-player

Steel Paws was an action role-playing game developed by YS Net and published by Namco Bandai released on March 25, 2025 for iOS and Android via Netflix Games. It was delisted in November 2025 and is no longer playable.

== Development ==
In 2008, Yu Suzuki created his video game incubation studio YS Net. This is the studios second big budget internationally released smart phone game, with Air Twister being their debut game. It was also the studios first game to be published with Bandai Namco.

On December 12, 2024 Bandai Namco announced YS Net's next game Steel Paws at The Game Awards 2024.

Similar to Air Twister, the game could initially only be played through a subscription. Air Twister was a timed exclusive for Apple Arcade while Steel Paws was available for Netflix Games, a value added service with a Netflix subscription.

== Release ==
The game was released March 25, 2025 for smart phones via Netflix Games.

It was then removed from Netflix on November 4, 2025.
