= Yu Suzuki =

Japanese game developer (born 1958)

- 鈴木 裕
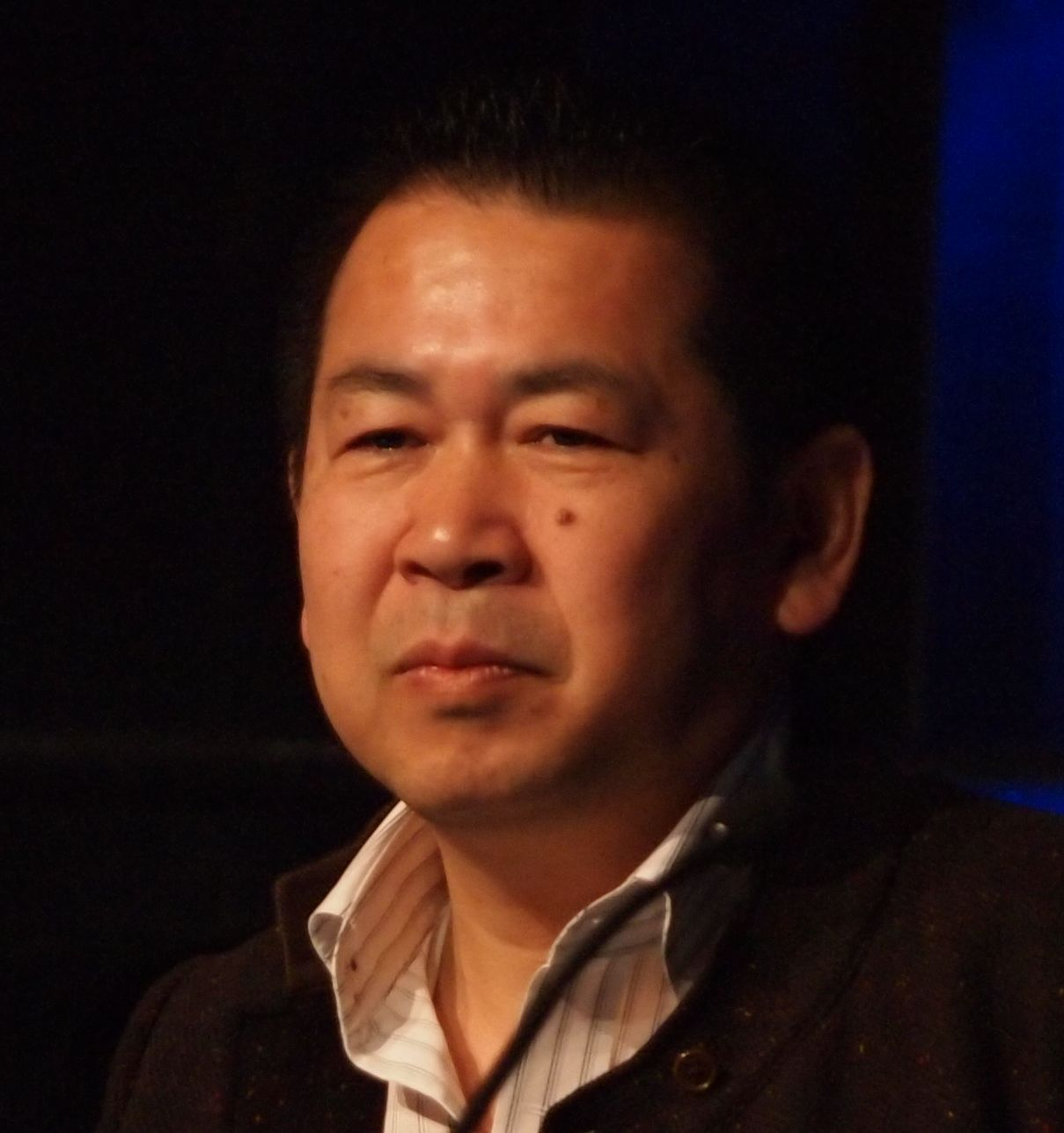
- Suzuki at the 2011 Game Developers Conference
- Born: June 10, 1958 (age 68); Kamaishi, Iwate, Japan
- Education: Okayama University of Science
- Occupations: Game producer, designer, director, programmer, software engineer
- Years active: 1983–present
- Employer(s): Sega (1983–2008); Ys Net (2008–present)
- Known for: Space Harrier; Out Run; Virtua Fighter series; Shenmue series
- Awards: AIAS Hall of Fame Award (2003)

Yu Suzuki (鈴木 裕, Suzuki Yū; born June 10, 1958) is a Japanese game developer who headed Sega's AM2 team for 18 years. He created a number of successful Sega arcade games, including Hang-On (1985), Space Harrier (1985), Out Run (1986) and After Burner (1987), which used motion simulator cabinets, and Virtua Racing (1992) and Virtua Fighter (1993), which pioneered 3D graphics.

As a hardware engineer, Suzuki led development of arcade system boards including the Sega Space Harrier, Model 1, Model 2 and Model 3. He was involved in the development of the Dreamcast console and the NAOMI arcade hardware.

In the late 1990s, Suzuki created the Shenmue series of action-adventure games. The original Shenmue (1999), for Dreamcast, was the most expensive video game ever developed at the time. The Shenmue games attracted a cult following, but were commercial failures. After Shenmue II, Suzuki produced OutRun 2 (2003), Virtua Cop 3 (2003) and Sega Race TV (2008) and worked on various projects which failed to see release. In 2008, he established his own development company, Ys Net, and left Sega in 2011. He developed Shenmue III (2019) following a successful crowdfunding campaign.

In 2003, Suzuki became the sixth person to be inducted into the Academy of Interactive Arts and Sciences' Hall of Fame. IGN named him the ninth-greatest video game creator. In 2011, he received the Pioneer Award at the Game Developers Choice Awards.

== Career ==
=== Sega ===
At the Okayama University of Science, Suzuki wrote an undergraduate thesis on the subject of 3D computer graphics in video games. He joined Sega in 1983 as a programmer. In his first year, he created the 2D boxing game Champion Boxing for Sega's first home game console, the SG-1000. According to Suzuki, the executive staff found the game so impressive that they released it in arcades by installing an SG-1000 into an arcade cabinet. He was promoted to project leader in his first year.

Suzuki began working on another arcade game which would prove to be the big stepping-off point of his career. "To develop this game," Suzuki told G4TV, "I rode on motorcycles a lot. When we came up with the prototype (for the arcades), I would ride on that prototype bike for hours and hours every day." His efforts culminated into the game Hang-On, released in 1985. Hang-On was a success as it broke new ground in arcade technology. It did not feature any traditional controls, as the movement of the on-screen avatar was dictated by the movements the player made with their body on the motorcycle cabinet. This began the "Taikan" trend, the use of motion-controlled hydraulic simulator arcade cabinets in many arcade games of the late 1980s, two decades before motion controls became popular on video game consoles. The three-dimensional sprite/tile scaling was handled in a similar manner to textures in later texture-mapped polygonal 3D games of the 1990s. Suzuki stated that his "designs were always 3D from the beginning. All the calculations in the system were 3D, even from Hang-On. I calculated the position, scale, and zoom rate in 3D and converted it backwards to 2D. So I was always thinking in 3D."

He soon followed with the 3D-esque third-person shooter game Space Harrier later that year. Showing his interest in Ferraris, Suzuki created the driving simulator Out Run, which was released in 1986. Although it didn't officially feature a Ferrari, the player controlled a car that looked almost exactly like one. Out Run offered players a wide variety of driving paths and routes to complete the game, adding elements of nonlinear gameplay and increasing replay value. It also featured a radio with three songs to choose from as players drove through the wide variety of landscapes. At the Golden Joystick Awards, Out Run was awarded the Game of the Year award. Suzuki had been interested in 3D technology since his days in college. Space Harrier and Out Run had graphics similar to 3D, but could not fully utilize the capabilities.

Suzuki's later hits included the jet fighting After Burner series in the late 1980s and the roller coaster kart racer Power Drift in 1988. Improving on the "Super Scaler" technology and road scrolling effects of Hang-On and Out Run, Power Drift created "all of its track layouts with flat bitmaps" to simulate a "wholly 3D space using strictly 2D technology."

In 1990, Suzuki brought out a spiritual sequel to After Burner called G-LOC. It featured the R360, a gyroscopic motion cabinet that rotated 360 degrees to give players the realistic illusion of flying a fighter jet.

Yu Suzuki introduced and spearheaded the Model series of arcade hardware which would help lay the foundation for 3D arcade games for AM2 but other arcade departments at Sega as well In 1992, they released the 3D Formula 1 racer Virtua Racing, which was considered one of, if not the most, realistic-looking arcade games on the market at that time. GameSpot listed it as one of the 15 most influential video games of all time, commenting: "It wasn't the first fully polygonal game on the market ... but along with Virtua Fighter, Sega's 1993 release on the same hardware, it was one of the games alongside several others from different rival company developers that popularized polygonals to the masses."

In 1993, Suzuki created Virtua Fighter, the first 3D fighting game, which became enormously popular and spawned a series of sequels and spinoffs. It inspired many 3D fighting games such as the Tekken and Soul Calibur series. Some of the Sony Computer Entertainment (SCE) staff involved in the creation of the original PlayStation console credit Virtua Fighter as inspiration for the PlayStation's 3D graphics hardware. According to SCE's former producer Ryoji Akagawa and chairman Shigeo Maruyama, the PlayStation was originally being considered as a 2D focused hardware, and it wasn't until the success of Virtua Fighter in the arcades that they decided to design the PlayStation as a 3D focused hardware. 1UP listed Virtua Fighter as one of the 50 most important games of all time. They credited it for creating the 3D fighting game genre, and more generally, demonstrating the potential of 3D polygon human characters (as the first to implement them in a useful way), showing the potential of realistic gameplay (introducing a character physics system and realistic character animations for the time), and introducing fighting game concepts such as the ring-out and the block button.

After developing the Sega Model 1, he worked on the development of the Sega Model 2. He acquired Lockheed Martin's military texture mapping technology that cost millions and managed to engineer it down to $50 per chip, which he used to introduce texture-mapped 3D characters with Virtua Fighter 2. The game industry gained mass-produced texture mapping as a result. Virtua Fighter 2 (1994) also introduced the use of motion capture animation technology, which was previously limited to the health industry. He then led the development of the Sega Model 3, which debuted with Virtua Fighter 3. In 1996, Computer and Video Games described Virtua Fighter 3 as "the most astounding display of video game graphic muscle ever in the history of this industry." The Virtua Fighter series was recognized by the Smithsonian Institution as an application which made great contributions to society in the field of art and entertainment. Suzuki also oversaw most of the home console conversions of AM2's arcade games.

As a producer, he worked on games such as Daytona USA, which featured texture filtering in 1993, and Virtua Cop, which in 1994 introduced 3D polygons to light gun shooters, and influenced the seminal 1997 first-person shooter GoldenEye 007. Listing him in their "75 Most Important People in the Games Industry of 1995", Next Generation wrote that "nobody has pushed arcade gaming as far as Yu Suzuki, and Suzuki just keeps on pushing".

Suzuki's Shenmue for the Dreamcast gave rise to a new style of adventure games, bending it away from the typical mold most games of its nature seem to fit into, with Suzuki's own concept denoted as "FREE" ("Full Reactive Eyes Entertainment"). Shenmue was an expensive title for Sega, with Suzuki stating in 2011 that the project cost approximately US$47 million including marketing. Shenmue was a major step forward for 3D open world, nonlinear gameplay, touted as offering an unparalleled level of player freedom, giving them full reign to explore an expansive sandbox city with its own day-night cycles, changing weather, and fully voiced non-player characters going about their daily routines. The game's large interactive environments, level of detail and the scope of its urban sandbox exploration has been compared to later sandbox games like Grand Theft Auto III and its sequels, Sega's Yakuza series, Fallout 3 and Deadly Premonition. The game also revived the quick time event mechanic and coined a name for it, "QTE". The mechanic has since appeared in many later games, including popular action games such as Resident Evil 4, God of War, Tomb Raider: Legend, Heavenly Sword and Robert Ludlum's The Bourne Conspiracy.

Suzuki's arcade game Ferrari F355 Challenge was a racing simulator created upon a strong partnership with Ferrari. Rubens Barrichello of the F1 Team Ferrari was quoted by Suzuki to "have considered to purchase one for practicing." The game was considered the most accurate racing simulation of the Ferrari F355 possible up until that time. After Shenmue II, Suzuki was as a producer for OutRun 2 and Virtua Cop 3 in 2003 and Sega Race TV in 2008. Hiroshi Kataoka succeeded him as head of AM2 department.

=== Departure from Sega ===
After his departure from AM2, Suzuki was involved in three ill-fated projects as a director. PsyPhi was a touchscreen fighting arcade game, that initially had concepts of curved screens which never got past the concept stage. The game was however successfully completed with standard touchscreens, but was never shipped as it performed poorly at location testing. Players' fingers heated up from the friction of moving over the screen, making the game painful to play. Another problem was the viability of the machine in a modern arcade environment due to arcade operators preferring cheaper cabinets with more standard inputs. Shenmue Online was part of Sega's initiative to penetrate the rising Asian MMO RPG markets. With the withdrawal of Sega's online division in China, development of Shenmue Online was cancelled. The development of Shenmue Online cost Sega and JCEntertainment almost $26 million. Another MMO, Pure Breed, did not leave the concept stage. It involved a western surrealist art style, and revolved around pet and human relationships.

In 2009, rumors surfaced that Suzuki would step down from Sega after 26 years of employment. However, an article written by Brendan Sinclair, a reporter for the American video game journalism website GameSpot, stated the rumors to be false and that an anonymous representative for Sega of America revealed that Suzuki was in fact not retiring, but staying "in a much more diminished capacity" than in the past. Suzuki planned to officially leave Sega in September 2011 to concentrate on his own development studio Ys Net, while retaining an advisory role within Sega. His last position at Sega was Creative Officer along with Toshihiro Nagoshi and Hiroshi Kataoka. As of 2019, Suzuki remained as a consultant for Sega, and suggested that he might return to the Virtua Fighter franchise.

=== Ys Net ===
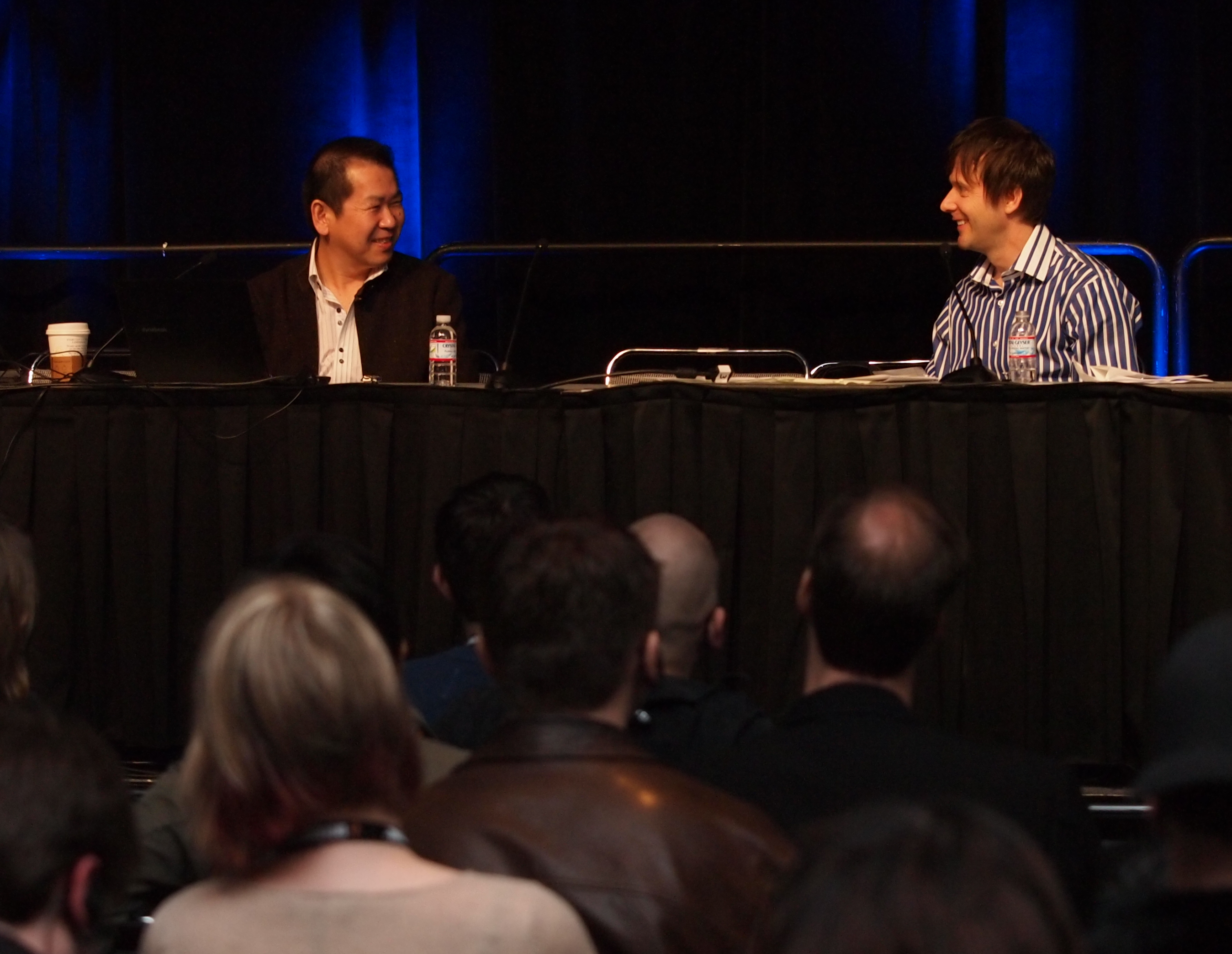
Suzuki and Mark Cerny at Game Developers Conference 2011

In the fall of 2010, Suzuki returned with Shenmue City, developed by Sunsoft and Ys Net (Yu Suzuki's new studio) for Yahoo Games. In December 2010, 1UP posted an interview with Yu Suzuki. It was his first English interview in several years. It was also a career retrospective conducted by former 1UP Editor in Chief James Mielke with Tak Hirai (both employees at Tetsuya Mizuguchi's Q Entertainment). In March 2011, Yu Suzuki was at GDC to receive a pioneer award for his body of work. Prior to the award ceremony, he participated in an open panel career retrospective hosted by Mark Cerny. Also at GDC he participated with MEGA64 to record his voice for a parody video on "how Shenmue was meant to end". In December 2011, Yu Suzuki flew to TGS (Toulouse Game Show) in France and participated in an open panel career retrospective. He also participated in an open with Tekken producer Katsuhiro Harada. They talked about their games and fought each other in both of their respected fighting franchises. In 2012, Suzuki designed a mobile game for the Virtua Fighter series, titled Cool Champ. In 2013, Suzuki designed a new shooting game, titled Shooting Wars with Premium Agency; this was Ys Net's first original game unrelated to any of Suzuki's previous Sega franchises.

In July 2013, Suzuki traveled to Monaco to attend the Monaco Animé Game Show. On March 19, 2014, Yu Suzuki held a Shenmue postmortem at the Game Developers Conference 2014, with Suzuki discussing the development of Shenmue. In June the same year, Yu Suzuki received a "Legend Award" in Barcelona, Spain during Gamelab Barcelona 2014.

On June 16, 2015, Shenmue III was revealed at E3 as a Kickstarter crowdfunding campaign. It became the fastest game ever to reach the one million dollar funding mark on the Kickstarter platform, ultimately raising 6.33 million dollars. Suzuki began his work as director of Shenmue III's development immediately following the successful funding campaign in July 2015. On February 27, 2016, Suzuki appeared as a guest presenter at the annual Monaco Anime Games International Conferences (MAGIC), where he showed images and video clips of the development progress for Shenmue III to conference attendees.

On June 22, 2022, YS-Net released Air Twister exclusively to Apple Arcade. YS Net has continued to support the game with regular updates and expanded content.

On December 12, 2024, Bandai Namco announced YS Net's next game, Steel Paws, at The Game Awards 2024. YS Net announced Steel Paws as a mobile game to be exclusively released for Netflix Games. It is an action role-playing game that features a young girl and her robot companions who explore a mysterious tower that emerges from the ground every 100 years.

== Personal life ==
Suzuki said in an interview that while he greatly enjoys creating games, he has relatively little interest in playing them and prefers to spend his free time watching movies and visiting theme parks.

== Games developed ==
Year	Title	Role
1984	Champion Boxing	Programmer
1985	Hang-On	Director, lead programmer
1985	Space Harrier	Director, lead programmer
1986	Out Run	Director, lead programmer
1987	After Burner	Director, lead programmer
1988	Power Drift	Director, lead programmer
1988	Dynamite Düx	Producer
1989	Sword of Vermilion	Producer
1990	G-LOC: Air Battle	Director, lead programmer
1990	GP Rider	Producer
1991	Strike Fighter	Producer
1991	Rent a Hero	Producer
1991	F1 Exhaust Note	Producer
1992	Arabian Fight	Producer
1992	Virtua Racing	Director, lead programmer
1992	Soreike Kokology	Producer
1993	Burning Rival	Producer
1993	Virtua Fighter	Director, producer
1993	Soreike Kokology 2	Producer
1994	Daytona USA	Producer
1994	Virtua Cop	Producer
1994	Virtua Fighter 2	Director, producer
1994	Desert Tank	Producer
1995	Virtua Striker	Producer
1995	Virtua Cop 2	Producer
1995	Fighting Vipers	Producer
1996	Virtua Fighter Kids	Producer
1996	Virtua Fighter 3	Director, producer
1996	Sonic the Fighters	Producer
1996	Scud Race	Producer
1996	Fighters Megamix	Producer
1997	Digital Dance Mix Vol. 1 Namie Amuro	Producer
1997	Virtua Striker 2	Producer
1997	All Japan Pro-Wrestling Featuring Virtua	Producer
1998	Fighting Vipers 2	Producer
1998	Daytona USA 2	Producer
1999	F355 Challenge	Director, producer
1999	Outtrigger	Producer
1999	18 Wheeler: American Pro Trucker	Producer
1999	Shenmue	Director, producer, writer
2001	Beach Spikers	Producer
2001	Virtua Fighter 4	Director, producer
2001	Shenmue II	Director, producer, writer
2002	The King of Route 66	Executive supervisor
2003	Virtua Cop 3	Executive director
2003	OutRun 2	Producer
2008	Sega Race TV	Producer
2010	Shenmue City	Director
2011	Virtua Fighter: Cool Champ	Director
2013	Bullet Pirates	Director
2014	Virtua Fighter: Fever Combo	Director
2019	Shenmue III	Director, producer, writer
2022	Air Twister	Director, producer
2025	Steel Paws	Director, producer

=== Canceled games ===
- Propeller Arena – Producer
- Pure Breed – Concept
- Psy-Phi – Director, producer
- Shenmue Online – Director

On top of games, Yu Suzuki led the creation of a technical demo, "Tower of Babel", prepared for the Dreamcast showcase at Tokyo New Otani Hotel on May 1, 1998.

== Hardware developed ==
- Sega Space Harrier (1985)
- Sega Model 1 (1992)
- Sega Model 2 (1993)
- Sega Model 3 (1996)
- Dreamcast (1998)
- Sega NAOMI (1998)
