= Shenmue =

Video game series

- Genres: Action-adventure; Interactive cinema Life simulation Social simulation
- Developers: Sega AM2 (1999–2002); Microsoft Game Studios Japan (2002); Ys Net (2010–2019); D3T (2018); Shibuya Productions (2019)
- Publishers: Sega (1999–present); Deep Silver (2019)
- Creator: Yu Suzuki
- Platforms: Dreamcast; Xbox; Xbox 360; Mobile phones; Windows; Xbox One; PlayStation 4; Nintendo Switch 2; PlayStation 5; Xbox Series X/S
- First release: Shenmue; December 29, 1999
- Latest release: Shenmue III; November 19, 2019

Shenmue (Note: Japanese: シェンムー, Hepburn: Shenmū; pronounced [ɕeꜜmmɯː], approximately /ˈʃɛn.muː/ SHEN-moo.) is an action-adventure game series created, produced and directed by Yu Suzuki. Shenmue (1999) and Shenmue II (2001) were developed by Sega AM2 and published by Sega for Dreamcast. In 2002, Shenmue II was released in North America and Europe on Xbox. Shenmue III, developed by Suzuki's company Ys Net, was released for PlayStation 4 and Windows in 2019.

The Shenmue games consist of open-world 3D environments interspersed with brawler battles and quick time events. They include elements of role-playing, life simulation and social simulation games, such as day-and-night systems, variable weather effects, and non-player characters with daily schedules, and interactive elements such as vending machines, arcades and minigames. The player controls the teenage martial artist Ryo Hazuki as he travels through 1980s Japan and China in pursuit of his father's killer.

The original Shenmue was the most expensive video game ever developed at the time, with an estimated production and marketing cost of US$47 to $70 million, though some of the development also covered Shenmue II. The games attracted a cult following, but were commercial failures. A social game, Shenmue City, was launched in Japan in 2010 and discontinued in 2011. Following a successful crowdfunding campaign, Suzuki developed Shenmue III independently. It was released for the PlayStation 4 and Windows in 2019.

Shenmue and Shenmue II received mostly positive reviews and have been included in lists of the greatest games. Critics praised their graphics, soundtrack, realism and ambition, but criticized their controls, slow pace and voice acting, and the focus on mundane detail divided players. They are credited for pioneering systems including quick time events and open worlds. Shenmue III received mixed reviews for its similarity to the earlier games. An anime adaptation of Shenmue, co-produced by Crunchyroll and Adult Swim, premiered in 2022. Suzuki expressed his hope to develop Shenmue IV.

== History ==
=== Shenmue and Shenmue II ===
Release timeline
1999	Shenmue
2000
2001	Shenmue II
2002–2009
2010	Shenmue City
2011–2017
2018	Shenmue I & II
2019	Shenmue III

The creator of Shenmue, Yu Suzuki, joined Sega in 1983 and created several successful arcade games, including Hang-On (1985), Out Run (1986) and Virtua Fighter (1993). In comparison to arcade games, where the ideal experience is only a few minutes long, Suzuki wanted to make a longer experience. In 1996, he and Sega AM2 began developing a role-playing game for the Sega Saturn based on the Virtua Fighter series.

In 1997, development moved to Sega's next console, the Dreamcast, and the Virtua Fighter connection was dropped. By the time of the Dreamcast's release in Japan in November 1998, the game had been titled Shenmue. Sega advertised Shenmue as belonging to a new genre it termed "full reactive eyes entertainment" or "FREE". It became the most expensive game ever developed at the time, reported to have cost US$70 million; in 2011, Suzuki said the figure was closer to $47 million including marketing. The development also covered some of Shenmue II (2001), which was completed for a smaller figure, and possibly groundwork for future Shenmue games.

Shenmue was released on December 29, 1999, in Japan, November 8, 2000 in North America, and December 1, 2000, in Europe. Shenmue II was released for Dreamcast in 2001 in Japan and Europe only. An Xbox port followed in 2002 in Europe and North America. Despite attracting positive reviews and a cult following, the games were commercial failures.

=== Shenmue Online and Shenmue City ===
After Shenmue II, Suzuki worked on various projects which failed to see release. In 2004, Sega announced a massively multiplayer online role-playing game for PC, Shenmue Online, developed with the Korean studio JCEntertainment. It was canceled in 2007. In 2008, Suzuki established his own development company, Ys Net, and left Sega in 2011. In December 2010, Sega launched Shenmue City, a social game for the Mobage service in Japan. Suzuki hoped that, if it were successful, it could be used to fund Shenmue III. It was shut down in December 2011.

=== Remasters ===
Sega and the British developer D3T began developing remasters of Shenmue I and II featuring new models, textures and lighting, but these were canceled in 2017. Sega said that combining "original animations and characters" with high-definition graphics did not meet their standards. Instead, in August 2018, Sega released high-definition ports for Windows, PlayStation 4 and Xbox One. They include new graphics and control options, improved user interfaces, and Japanese and English voices. Some details, such as product placement, are omitted, and cutscenes are presented in their original aspect ratio due to technical limitations.

=== Shenmue III ===
During Sony's presentation at the E3 conference on June 15, 2015, Suzuki announced a Kickstarter crowdfunding campaign for Shenmue III, having licensed the series from Sega. Shenmue III became the fastest-funded and the highest-funded video game project in Kickstarter history, reaching its initial $2 million goal in just over nine hours and earning $6.3 million in total. It was released on 19 November 2019 for PlayStation 4 and Windows.

=== Future ===
In 2015, Suzuki said he hoped Shenmue would cover four or five games. In 2019, he said the first three games had covered only around 40% of the story. Shenmue III includes a letter to fans from Suzuki expressing his hope to develop Shenmue IV. In 2020, Suzuki told IGN he had created Shenmue III "for the fans", and that he planned to give Shenmue IV more mainstream appeal.

In June 2024, fans purchased a 15-second advertisement on a Times Square video billboard to campaign for Shenmue IV. In December 2025, Ys Net said it was considering legal action over a hoax Shenmue IV trailer made with AI. IGN characterized the trailer as part of a wave of AI hoaxes that were becoming difficult to discern from real game footage. In July 2026, the British novelty candidate Count Binface released a video demanding Sega release Shenmue IV.

== Gameplay ==
The player controls the teenage martial arts pupil Ryo Hazuki as he investigates his father's murder. They explore the Yokosuka, Hong Kong and Guilin open worlds, searching for clues, examining objects and talking to non-player characters for information. The games feature a fighting system similar to Sega's Virtua Fighter series; Ryo can fight multiple opponents at once, and can practice moves to increase their power. In quick time events, the player must press the right combination of buttons at the right moment to succeed. Shenmue III introduces a stamina system, whereby Ryo's hit points (HP) gradually decline as the player explores. If his HP drops too low, he loses the ability to sprint. Ryo can restore HP through sleeping and eating.

Shenmue I and Shenmue II feature a level of detail considered unprecedented for games at the time of their release. Shops open and close, buses run to timetables, and characters have their own routines, each in accordance with the game's persistent clock. Ryo receives a daily allowance which can be spent on objects including food, raffle tickets, audio cassettes and capsule toys. There are several minigames; for example, Ryo can throw darts or play complete versions of Sega arcade games, or earn money from minigames including driving forklift trucks, gambling, arm wrestling, fishing and street fighting. The Dreamcast version of Shenmue II allows the player to import their save data from Shenmue, carrying over money, inventory items and martial arts moves.

== Story ==
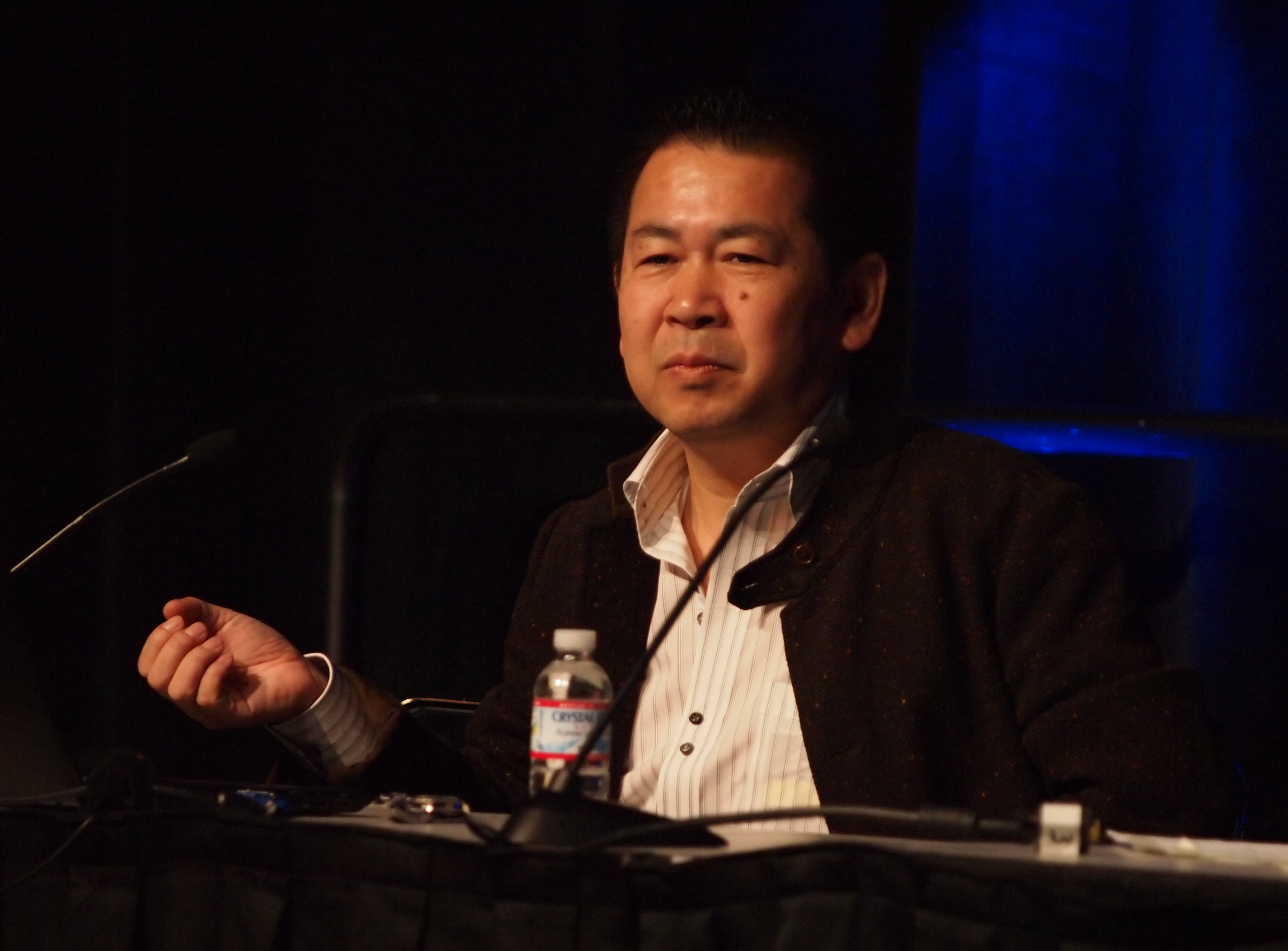
The Shenmue series was created by Yu Suzuki (pictured in 2011).

=== Shenmue ===
In 1986 Yokosuka, Japan, the teenage martial artist Ryo Hazuki returns to his family dojo to witness a confrontation between his father, Iwao, and a Chinese man, Lan Di. Lan Di demands Iwao give him a mysterious stone artifact, the dragon mirror. When he threatens to kill Ryo, Iwao tells him the mirror is buried under the cherry blossom tree outside. As Lan Di's men dig up the mirror, Lan Di mentions Zhao Sunming, whom Iwao allegedly killed in Mengcun, China. Lan Di delivers a finishing blow and Iwao dies in Ryo's arms.

Ryo's investigation leads him to Master Chen in the Yokosuka harbor. Through Chen and his son Guizhang, Ryo learns that the dragon mirror taken by Lan Di is one of two mirrors. He locates the second, the phoenix mirror, in a basement hidden beneath his father's dojo. He defeats a local gang connected to Lan Di's organization, and Master Chen tells him to seek the aid of Master Xiuying in Hong Kong. Ryo boards a boat to China.

=== Shenmue II ===
In Hong Kong, Ryo finds Master Xiuying Hong, but she refuses to help him, considering his quest for vengeance reckless. Ryo teams up with a gang leader, Wuying Ren, a free-spirited motorcyclist, Joy, and a street boy, Wong, to find Yuanda Zhu, who sent Ryo's father a letter warning him of Lan Di's intentions.

Ryo and his allies locate Zhu in Kowloon Walled City, but are ambushed by the criminal Yellow Head organization and Zhu is kidnapped. Ryo rescues Zhu as Lan Di departs by helicopter. Zhu reveals that Lan Di killed Ryo's father because he believes Iwao killed his own father. Zhu also reveals that the mirrors will lead to the resurrection of the Qing Dynasty, the last imperial dynasty of China. Zhu advises Ryo to continue his search in the village of Bailu in Guilin, where Lan Di is also heading. There, Ryo meets a teenage girl, Shenhua Ling, whose family is connected to the legacy of the dragon and phoenix mirrors. She leads Ryo to a stone quarry on the village outskirts to meet her father, but discovers he is missing.

=== Shenmue III ===
Ryo learns that Lan Di's father, Zhao Sunming, once visited Bailu with Ryo's father to train under the local grandmaster. Zhao died under mysterious circumstances several years later. Ryo also discovers that the phoenix and dragon mirrors were created by Shenhua's great-grandfather at the request of the Chinese emperor.

Ryo and Shenhua learn that Shenhua's father, Yuan, has been kidnapped by a local gang looking for the phoenix mirror. Ryo defeats two of the thugs, but is defeated by their boss, Yanlang. He convinces Sun, a local martial arts master, to teach him a powerful Bajiquan move, and uses it to defeat Yanlang. A village elder helps them discover a map to the treasure connected to the mirrors. Ryo fends off an attack from Chai, who reveals that Yuan and Xu have been taken to the city of Niaowu.

In Niaowu, Ryo and Shenhua learn that a local gang, the Red Snakes, is holding Yuan and Xu hostage. Shenhua is tricked by a Chi You Men leader, Niao Sun. Ryo and his allies infiltrate the Chi You Men's castle and rescue Shenhua and her father. Ryo confronts Lan Di, but Lan Di easily defeats him. Niao Sun betrays Lan Di and has her men burn the castle. Ryo, Ren and Shenhua continue their journey along the Great Wall of China.

== Reception ==
Aggregate review scores
Game	Metacritic
Shenmue	(DC) 89% (Note: GameRankings score)
Shenmue II	(DC) 88/100 (Xbox) 80/100
Shenmue III	(PC) 69/100 (PS4) 67/100

The Shenmue series has received mostly positive reviews and has attracted a cult following, with Shenmue I and II appearing in several lists of the greatest video games. Shenmue III, released almost two decades later, received mixed reviews for its similarity to the earlier games; some critics described it as outdated, while others praised its faithfulness to the franchise. The series has received praise for its graphics, soundtrack, realism and ambition, but criticism for its controls, slow pace and voice acting; its realism and focus on mundane detail divided players.

Shenmue is credited for pioneering several game technologies. Its large environments, wealth of options and level of detail have been compared to later open-world games including the Grand Theft Auto series, the Yakuza series, Fallout 3 (2008), and Deadly Premonition (2010). Shenmue is also credited for naming and popularizing the quick time event, since used in series such as Resident Evil, God of War and Tomb Raider. In a 2025 public poll held by the British Academy of Film and Television Arts, Shenmue was voted the most influential game of all time.

== Other media ==
Ryo is playable in other Sega video games, including Sonic & Sega All-Stars Racing (2010), Sonic & All-Stars Racing Transformed (2012), Project X Zone 2 (2015) and Sega Heroes (2018). An anime adaptation, Shenmue: The Animation, premiered on the US network Adult Swim's Toonami programming block and the streaming platform Crunchyroll on February 6, 2022. It was directed by Sakurai Chikara, with Suzuki as executive producer, and adapts the first two games. It was animated by Telecom Animation Film, with production management by Sola Entertainment.

Several Shenmue soundtracks have been released. A promotional album, Shenmue Juke Box, was packaged with the limited edition of the original game in Japan and North America, containing ten select tracks from the in-game cassette tapes. A soundtrack for the first game, Shenmue OST: Chapter 1: Yokosuka, was released in 2000. In September 2015, Data Discs released the Shenmue soundtrack on vinyl in three editions. In March 2016, the music of Shenmue was voted into the UK Classic FM Hall of Fame in 144th place.
