= Shenmue City =

2010 video game

- Logo
- Developer: Ys Net
- Publisher: Ys Net
- Director: Yu Suzuki
- Series: Shenmue
- Platforms: Mobile phones, Mobage
- Release: JP: December 2010
- Genre: Social role-playing video game
- Mode: Multiplayer

Shenmue City (シェンムー街, Shenmū Machi) is a social game released for mobile phones in Japan. It was conceived as a way of relaunching the Shenmue franchise by its creator, Yu Suzuki. It was announced in late 2010 for cell phones and PC, but the Windows version was cancelled. The game was discontinued in late 2011.

== Gameplay ==
Players control one of the residents of Yokosuka, Japan, which was the setting for the original Shenmue (1999). There were also plans to let players travel to other Shenmue locations, such as Hong Kong, in content updates.

== Plot ==
The main character is a follower of Ryo Hazuki and is guided by him to explore, attempt quests, and grow strong through battle. Characters from other Shenmue games make appearances, and much of the original Shenmue plot is retold.

== Development ==
Shenmue City was conceived when Yu Suzuki noted the popularity of Mafia Wars, a social game designed for mobile phones. Suzuki formed a plan that if the game was a success, its popularity could be used to make a game to conclude the Shenmue series. Suzuki stated in an interview with Famitsu that he wanted to explore the series without very expensive graphics or sound elements like the original game. The games beta began on September 21, 2010 on the Yahoo! Japan and Japanese phone carrier DeNA's Yahoo! Mobage network. On October 7, 2010, Shenmue City was also announced for the PC as a browser-based game with a winter 2010 release date, but was never released. The game shut down on December 26, 2011.
