= Psy-Phi =

- Developer: Sega
- Publisher: Sega
- Director: Yu Suzuki
- Producer: Yu Suzuki
- Platform: Arcade
- Release: Cancelled
- Genre: Fighting
- Modes: Single player, multiplayer
- Arcade system: Sega Lindbergh

Psy-Phi (Japanese: サイファイ) was a cancelled fighting game developed for the Lindbergh arcade platform by new development studio Digital Rex, a development group within Sega, headed by Yu Suzuki formerly head of Sega-AM2. It is the first arcade fighting game to incorporate touchscreen controls. Shortly after location testing in 2005, its planned 2006 wide release was cancelled.

== Gameplay ==
The futuristic fighter's premise casts the player as one of several warriors who are engaging in one-on-one combat. However, Psy-Phi's twist is that the players will be floating around an opponent and relying on powerful blasts of energy as an attack. The premise of the game drew comparisons to Dragon Ball Z and Dreamcast game Psychic Force 2012. The game featured characters: Ays, Reid, Vient, Silva, and Ness.

== Development ==
Psy-Phi is an arcade game based on Sega's Lindbergh hardware. The project was headed by Yu Suzuki and incorporates a 29" touchscreen display for gameplay. An action-shooting game with one-on-one combat, players hovered in the air and competed with each other with attacks by trailing a path on the touchscreen or inputting special symbols on the touchscreen.

Suzuki revealed that he enjoys Japanese manga adaptations of great science fiction works by the likes of Jules Verne and H. G. Wells where the main characters have superpowers. Space Harrier actually came about because of this interest. Suzuki says the manga Babel II was his main inspiration in the creation of this game, and he had described it as "futuristic dodge ball".

The game was showcased to an international audience at the Japan Amusement Machinery Manufacturers Association (JAMMA) along with other Lindbergh titles including After Burner: Climax, Ghost Squad: Evolution, The House of the Dead 4, Initial D Arcade Stage 4, Let's Go Jungle!: Lost on the Island of Spice, OutRun 2 SP SDX, Sega Professional Tennis: Power Smash 3, and Virtua Fighter 5.

Psy-Phi's graphics—one aspect of the game that were questionably because it was the first Lindbergh game to be shown publicly. The graphics at JAMMA 2005 were described as "sharp, but they won't blow anyone away yet. The character models sport a high number of polygons and animate quite nicely. The special effects used for the various attacks are sharp and go crazy with particles and lighting. The stages shown were low-key open areas that weren't big on detail at that moment." The relatively unimpressive graphics were attributed to the fact that the game started development for the Sega Chihiro arcade hardware.

The original release was planned for spring 2006, but the arcade units were called back on March 6 (the units were still in shipping and had yet to reach arcades). It was then unknown whether the game was cancelled or called back for further development. Some units were previewed at trade shows, as well as some arcades receiving units for beta tests (most notably GameWorks).
