= Quick time event =

Gameplay element

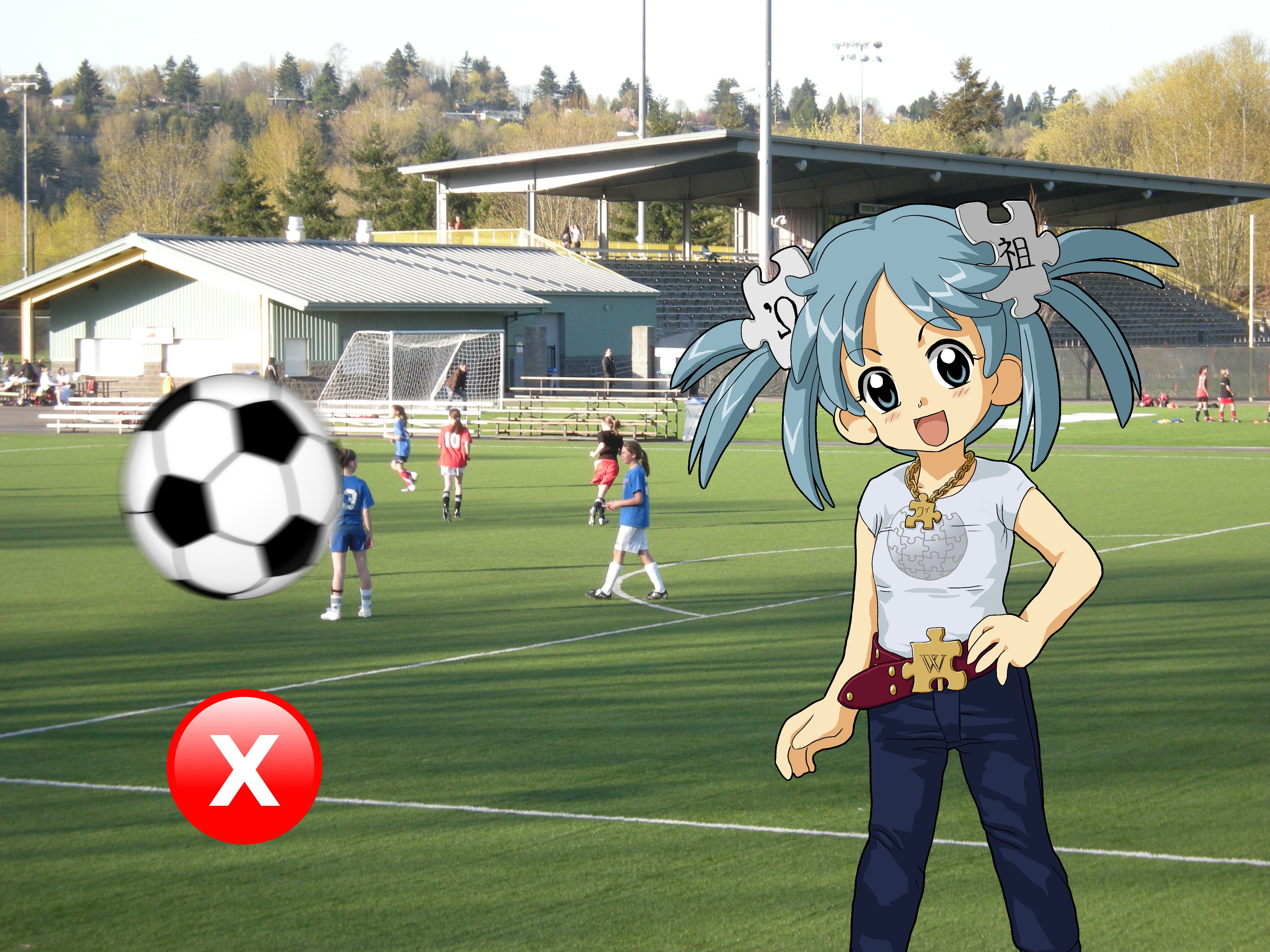
A hypothetical example of a quick time event in a video game. Pressing the X button can make Wikipe-tan kick the football.

In video games, a quick time event (QTE) is a method of context-sensitive gameplay in which the player performs actions on the control device shortly after the appearance of an on-screen instruction/prompt. It allows for limited control of a game character during cut scenes or cinematic sequences in the game. Performing the wrong prompt, mistiming the action, or not performing any action at all often results in the character's failure at their task, resulting in a death/failure animation and often an immediate game over or the loss of a life, with some games providing a lesser but significant penalty of sorts instead. QTEs can also be used simply to increase immersion or interactivity in a scene without any penalty for failing them.

The term "quick time event" is attributed to Yu Suzuki, director of the game Shenmue which used the QTE feature (then called "quick timer events") to a great degree. They allow for the game designer to create sequences of actions that cannot be expressed through the game's standard control scheme, or to constrain the player into taking only one specific action at a critical moment.

While some uses of QTE have been considered as favorable additions to gameplay, the general use of QTE has been panned by journalists and players alike, as these events can break the flow of the game and force the player to repeat sections until they master the event, adding false difficulty to the game.

== Mechanics ==
QTEs generally involve the player following onscreen prompts to press buttons or manipulate joysticks within a limited amount of time. Games played on systems controlled with motion controllers, such as Nintendo's seventh-generation Wii and Nintendo DS, may also implement QTEs with appropriate gestures (for example, the Wii version of Tomb Raider Anniversary requires players to thrust both the Wii Remote and Nunchuk, held in each hand, forward simultaneously to evade a dangerous situation in a cutscene). The prompts are often displayed as a graphical image of the physical controller button; for example, games on PlayStation systems may show any of the four shape-marked face buttons (cross, square, circle or triangle) on the DualShock controller as inputs for the event. Such actions are either atypical of the normal controls during the game or in a different context from their assigned functions. Whilst most prompts simply require the player to push the appropriate button in time, some may require different types of actions, such as pressing a few buttons in a certain order, repeatedly pressing a button a certain number of times within the time limit, or hitting the button with precise timing.

== History ==
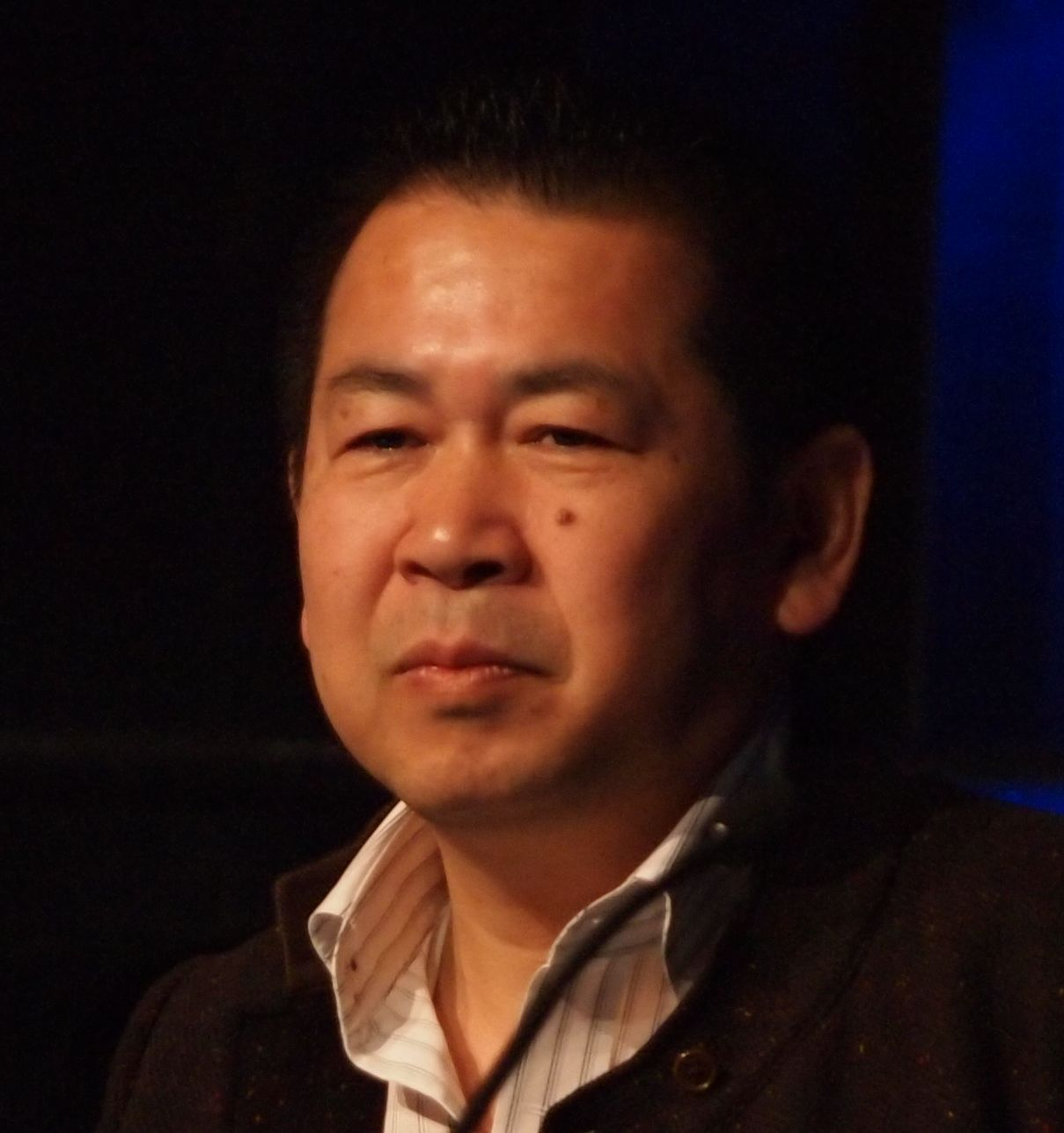
Yu Suzuki is credited with coining the term "quick-time event" and popularizing its use in Shenmue.

Although the origin of QTE are often attributed to interactive movie laserdisc video games that showed video clips stored on a laserdisc like Dragon's Lair (Cinematronics, June 1983), Cliff Hanger (Stern, December 1983) and Road Blaster (Data East, 1985), these left little room for more advanced gameplay elements. These games had graphics on par with animated cartoons at a time when video games were composed of simple, pixelated characters. Their gameplay consisted of watching an animated video and pressing the correct button every few seconds to avoid seeing a (circumstance-specific) loss scene and losing a life. Compared to modern titles, games like Dragon's Lair would require the player to memorize the proper sequence and timing of their input, effectively making the entire game one continuous QTE. Such uses were also seen as giving the player only the illusion of control, as outside of responding to QTE, there were no other commands the player could enter; effectively, these games were considered the equivalent of watching a movie and responding every few minutes to allow it to continue. An improvement to the QTE mechanic was flashing the buttons that need to be pressed on the screen, which appeared in the laserdisc games Super Don Quix-ote (Universal, 1984), Ninja Hayate (Taito, 1984), Time Gal (Taito, 1985) and Road Blaster.

Phantasmagoria (1995) requires the player to act within a timed period at certain points to survive, such as using sulfuric acid within ten seconds on an enemy attacking her. Die Hard Arcade (Sega, 1996), Sword of the Berserk: Guts' Rage and most notably Shenmue (Sega, 1999) for the Dreamcast introduced QTEs in the modern form of cutscene interludes in an otherwise more interactive game. Shenmue's director Yu Suzuki is credited with coining the phrase "Quick Time Event", which were included in the game as to provide "a fusion of gameplay and movie" and create cinematic experience to the player. The game's manual called them "quick timer events", but the phrase became popularized as "quick time events" since its release. Since this period, several other games on modern console and game systems have included QTEs or similar mechanics, and are not limited to the action or adventure genre. For instance, in the Wii version of the sports games 2010 FIFA World Cup South Africa, QTEs are used to save penalty shots and free kicks aimed towards the goal, or win possession of the ball after it is punted or corner-kicked. Failure to execute the quick time event in time would result in the opposing team scoring a goal or claiming possession of the ball.

To improve game accessibility, action games increasingly contain options to individually disable quick time events and other design elements that contribute to a game's difficulty.

== Use and critical reaction ==
QTEs have received mixed reactions from players and journalists. They can be used effectively to enhance cutscenes and other actions. The use of QTEs within Shenmue is often praised, as "they seamlessly flow from cinema to the QTE sequence without any loading pauses at all", and sections which utilized the QTE were considered "some of the most thrilling in the whole game". At the same time, they also are considered to be a weak addition to gameplay, and often force the player to repeat such sections until they complete the QTE perfectly to move on. They are often considered a "bane of action games", as their presence breaks the standard flow of the game and reduce the control of the game for the player to a few buttons, distracting, and turning interactivity into a job. Also, QTEs may frustrate the player due to the fact that they might not have any sign that they are about to happen.

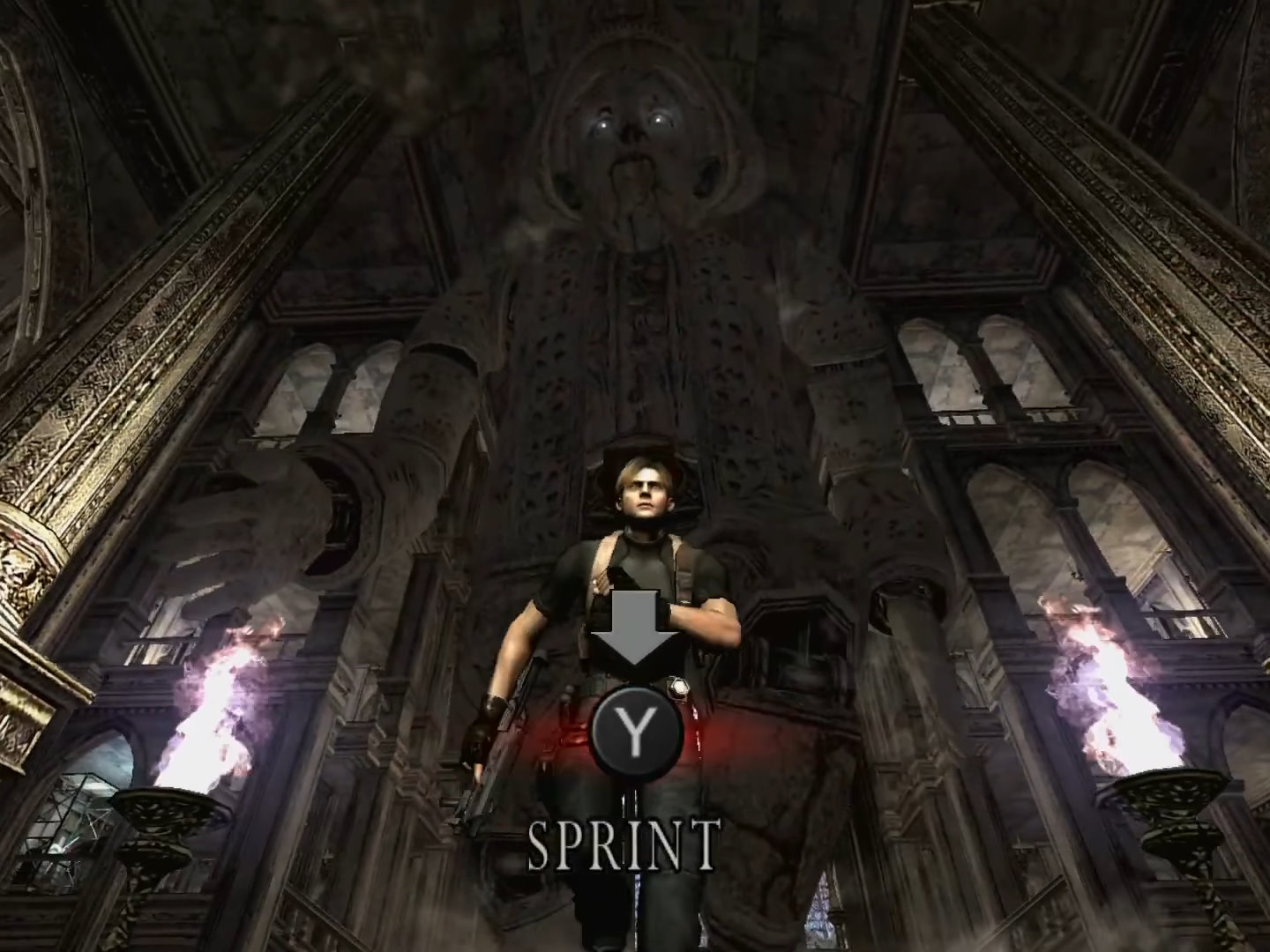
A quick time event in Resident Evil 4. The player is prompted to repeatedly press Y to make the character sprint.

QTEs are often used during dramatic cutscenes. Resident Evil 4 uses QTEs (described by cinematics lead Yoshiaki Hirabayashi as an "action button system") to "facilitate a seamless transition between gameplay and the in-game movies" and prevent players from losing interest during cutscenes. One example in Resident Evil 4 is a knife fight. The fight occurs during a late-game cutscene where the protagonist meets a major villain, who explains missing links in the game's story while periodically slashing at the protagonist and requiring the player to quickly press a button to parry him; missing a QTE will result in the protagonist's death, forcing the player to restart the cutscene and fight. As the action takes place during the major revelation of the game, the QTE serves to prevent the player from skipping over the cutscene. While this example has been cited as an effective use of QTEs for punctuating the heated discussion between the characters with rapid player reactions, critics have criticized it for punishing a missed button press with death. It is common to punish missed QTEs in this manner, and the phrase "Press X to not die" has become a common method of describing them as a result. It has also been argued that when a QTE is used during such a scene, the player's attention is drawn away from the animation and instead to the area of the screen where the button control indicator would appear, rendering the effort put into animating the scene meaningless.

Quick time events have sometimes been accused of diluting the emotion and importance of a cutscene into a single button press, trivializing the nature of the scene. This issue was raised from Call of Duty: Advanced Warfare, in which during an early scene where the player character attends the funeral of a fallen fellow soldier, the player is given the option to press a button to mourn for the soldier. Forcing this type of interaction has been criticized as a poor form of storytelling, and some have argued the scene could have been played out without requiring player action to make the same form of emotional connection to the protagonist, or with the player given more control of the character.

Quick time events may be used to provide a limited control scheme for a scene within the game that would be otherwise difficult or impossible to perform with the game's standard controls. A second example from Shenmue II requires the player to navigate several narrow planks across a void in a disused building, every so often responding to a QTE to regain the character's balance, with each successive plank requiring more and quicker responses to QTEs. Failing to respond to the QTE leads to the character's death and requiring the player to restart the sequence. This sequence has been strongly criticized, as when the plank sequence is finished, the player is rejoined by another character who had used the elevator to bypass the floors, an option not given to the player.

Certain games integrated QTEs more directly into the gameplay and do not end the game for the player upon failure. The God of War series uses QTEs as finishing moves: by completing the maneuver successfully, the player can defeat larger beasts or bosses, but failure to complete only leads to being tossed away, upon which the player can move back into battle to continue the fight. Another example of this usage is from the game Ninja Blade; during a special attack by the boss, the player can attempt a series of QTEs to minimize the distance that the protagonist is pushed back down a long hallway from the boss, reducing the amount of time and damage that the character would then take in rushing the boss at the conclusion of the attack. Other means of incorporating the QTE into gameplay include manipulating the environment to gain a tactical advantage; an example of this is seen in Gears of War 2, which includes one area where the player character and his non-player character squad are on a circular elevator, fending off hordes of monsters engaging them on all sides. By temporarily abandoning the battle, the player can engage the elevator through a QTE at its control panel to gain the high ground, though this gain can be nullified if the monsters engage a second control panel.

In some story-driven games, QTEs may alter or provide more details about the game's story and affect the character later in the game, though the changes are generally minimal, essentially boiling down to a "what if?" scenario. In Mass Effect 2 and Mass Effect 3, certain cutscenes contain dramatic moments where a QTE will appear for a short moment, indicating an action that will drive the character towards either extreme of a morality scale. In one case, the player is given the opportunity to stop ruffians from firing upon a weaker character, with the QTE provided helping to boost the player towards higher moral standing. Telltale Games' The Walking Dead includes QTEs intermittently, creating tension throughout the game. Furthermore, during conversation trees with non-player characters, failure to select the next choice of topic in a limited time may affect later events in the game. This "quick time conversation" mechanic is used in other Telltale games as well.

The games Fahrenheit (Indigo Prophecy in North America), Heavy Rain, Beyond: Two Souls, and Detroit: Become Human from French studio Quantic Dream are primarily presented as sequences of QTEs, integrating the mechanic as part of the core gameplay, and present controller actions that correlate directly with the character actions on the screen; this was emphasized further in Heavy Rain by a game patch to support the use of the PlayStation Move motion controls where the player could actually physically perform the moves that corresponded with character actions. In these games, players may miss certain QTEs, or may be given a choice of multiple QTEs they could perform; opting of which QTEs to perform would alter the story, with the possibility of character death at some later point. In Heavy Rain, for example, the player controls the fates of the game's four playable characters, leading to numerous different endings if the characters remained alive and if they had discovered critical information. Even prior to Heavy Rain's release, the game's director David Cage had to defend his vision of the game from critics that were skeptical of the reliance on QTEs within Heavy Rain and created an early stigma on the game's reception. Despite the integration, Heavy Rain was often criticized for use of QTEs in otherwise non-dramatic situations. In an early sequence in the game, the player has to control the lead character to find his son Jason in the mall, with the only available action of pressing the "X" button to shout "Jason" having no apparent effect.

With the onset of newer technology to improve graphics, controls, in-game physics, and artificial intelligence, gameplay elements previously simulated through QTEs can potentially be re-implemented as core game mechanics. Road Blaster used QTEs to steer the car and ram other vehicles off the road in pre-rendered animated scenes, whereas the 2008 video game Burnout Paradise gives the player full control of the vehicle and uses its game engine to create real-time crashes with other vehicles. Similarly, Dragon's Lair 3D: Return to the Lair recreates the experience of the pre-animated scenes from Dragon's Lair as a platform game, allowing the player to react freely to the environmental traps and monsters.
