= Shenmue Online =

- Developer: Sega
- Publisher: Sega
- Designer: Yu Suzuki
- Platform: Microsoft Windows
- Release: Cancelled
- Genre: MMORPG
- Mode: Multiplayer

Shenmue Online (シェンムーオンライン「莎木OL, Shenmū Onrain) was a cancelled MMORPG set in the world of Shenmue. Players participate in scenarios from Shenmue II (2001), joining one of three clans, led by the characters Shen Hua, Xiu Ying and Wu Ying Ren.

== Development history ==
In 2004, Shenmue Online was announced to be development in joint venture between Sega Japan and JC Entertainment of Korea. A private beta testing period was due to begin in South Korea in November 2005, with a public beta in China in spring 2005, before a release later in 2005. When Shenmue Online was first announced, under the development of JC Entertainment, the screenshots released were considered by many Shenmue fans to be disappointing graphically, especially as being part of a game series that boasted ground-breaking graphics on the Dreamcast.

In 2005, JC Entertainment pulled out of the development of Shenmue Online, and as they owned 50% of the properties of Shenmue Online, there was legal debate over who had the rights to the game. However, in November 2005, it was confirmed in an interview with Yu Suzuki that even though the Korean company JCE had announced their withdrawal from development, since Shenmue Online is a Sega venture, they would fulfil their duty of completing it. Yu said despite the internet rumours, development was well on its way and following their original goals and target. He added that Sega Sammy would make an official announcement about its progress in the future.

At the China Joy convention in July 2006, with the development under the guise of a Taiwan-based company, a trailer was shown, which showcased features, including mini games and combat with marked graphical improvements.

In 2006, six new screens from the gameplay along with a 14-minute video were released to the public during the fourth China Expo. These shots showed further improvement on graphical issues, comparing the graphics to other MMOs, and even home versions of Shenmue.

Since 2007, news about Shenmue Online slowly declined and reports of its cancellation appeared on Destructoid and Wired. Sega did not publicly confirm or deny the reports, but the game never released.

== Gameplay ==
Quoted from an interpretation of Yu Suzuki's 2005-11-05 interview:

Players will join one of three clans, led by Sha Hua, Xiu Ying and Wu Ying, and go through the story by completing tasks given by the leaders. Of course, during the course of the story, each clan will interact with one another in both friendly and hostile situations. Lan Di and Ryo will definitely make appearances in those situations as well.

When asked about the various activities possible in Shenmue II and whether they will make it into Shenmue Online, Yu says that the arcade games will definitely make it in, and 2/3 of the things like working, collecting capsule toys, etc, from Shenmue II will make it into Shenmue Online, along with much more contents exclusive to Shenmue Online. Yu adds that the game will take place not only in Hong Kong and China, but Macau as well, Yu smiled when he was asked what players will be able to do in Macao.

Yu says that QTE's will make it into Shenmue Online; but conceptually, it is impossible to implement the exact same kind of QTE into an online game. So in Shenmue Online, QTE's will be something geared towards an online MMO game, but since the implementation haven't been finalized yet, he can't go into specifics.

Yu states that Shenmue's world is very suitable for online play. Shenmue Online's world will be much bigger than the home versions thus far, including over 1200 buildings/locations, and it will be possible for each player to have his or her own house. Yu adds that he has always been very fond of Chinese culture, so he is very happy that Shenmue is liked by the Chinese gamers. This is why he is making this game for the Chinese market. But from a game perspective, Shenmue Online will include many things that all gamers will be able to enjoy.
