= Huni (disambiguation) =

Huni may refer to:

== People ==
- Huni, an ancient Egyptian king and the last pharaoh of the 3rd dynasty during the Old Kingdom period
- Huni (gamer), in-game name of Seung Heo-hoon, a South Korean professional League of Legends player
- Abdel Moneim al-Houni, Libyan military officer, diplomat, and politician

== Places ==
- Huni Sefid, a village in Shahi Rural District, Sardasht District, Dezful County, Khuzestan Province, Iran
- Huni Valley, a small town in the Prestea-Huni Valley District of Ghana's Western Region.
  - Huni Valley Senior High School
- Honuj, a village in Ekhtiarabad Rural District, in the Central District of Kerman County, Kerman Province, Iran

== Other ==
- HuniePop, an adult hybrid tile matching puzzle game and dating sim

== See also ==
- Honey (disambiguation)
