= List of Panty & Stocking with Garterbelt episodes =

Panty & Stocking with Garterbelt is a Japanese anime television series produced by Gainax (first series + special) and Trigger (second series). The series follows two angel sisters, Panty and Stocking, who were kicked out of Heaven for bad behavior and, in order to return, must earn Heaven Coins by defeating Ghosts, evil spirits that plague Daten City. The first series was broadcast in Japan on BS Nittele from October 2 to December 25, 2010. (Note: BS NTV listed the first series premiere as airing on October 1 at 27:00, which is effectively October 2 at 3:00 a.m. JST.) Internationally, the series is streamed online on Crunchyroll. An original video animation (OVA) collection of eight short segments was included exclusively on the fifth home media volume which released on April 28, 2011. The series' music is composed by Taku Takahashi of M-Flo. The opening theme song is "Theme for Panty and Stocking", performed by Hoshina Anniversary, while the ending theme song is "Fallen Angel", performed by Aimee B. Each episode's title is a reference to film titles, both in Japanese and internationally. The first series was licensed in North America by Funimation (now known as Crunchyroll, LLC).

A new anime project based on the series was announced by Trigger at Anime Expo 2022. The following year at the same expo, it was announced that the rights to the Panty & Stocking IP had been acquired from Gainax by Trigger, who shared an announcement video for the project. It was later revealed to be a sequel series, with Hiroyuki Imaishi returning as director and also handling series composition alongside Hiromi Wakabayashi and Atsushi Nishigori. The sequel series aired with censorship from July 10 to September 25, 2025, on Tokyo MX, BS NTV, SUN and other networks, while the uncensored version followed on AT-X from July 15 to September 30 of the same year. (Note: Tokyo MX, BS NTV and SUN listed the second series premiere as airing on July 9 at 25:00, which is effectively July 10 at 1:00 a.m. JST.) The second series has been licensed by Amazon Prime Video for worldwide streaming. The world premiere for the series was held at Anime Expo 2025 on July 4, 2025.

== Series overview ==
Series	Episodes	Segments	Originally released	
Series	Episodes	Segments	First released	Last released
PSG	13	28	October 2, 2010	December 25, 2010
OVA	1	8	April 28, 2011	
New	13	30	July 10, 2025	September 25, 2025

== Episodes ==
=== Panty & Stocking with Garterbelt (2010) ===
No. overall	No. in series	Title	Directed by	Written by	Animation directed by	Original release date
1	1	"Excretion Without Honor and Humanity"; Transliteration: "Jingi Naki Haisetsu" (Japanese: 仁義なき排泄)	Hiroyuki Imaishi	Hiroyuki Imaishi	Atsushi Nishigori	October 2, 2010
1	1	"Death Race 2010"; Transliteration: "Desu Rēsu Nisen-jū" (Japanese: デスレース2010)	Directed by : Masahiko Otsuka; Storyboarded by : Hiroyuki Imaishi	Masahiko Otsuka	Sushio	October 2, 2010
"Excretion Without Honor and Humanity": Panty and Stocking are sent to investigate several cases of people getting eaten by toilets, which are caused by a Ghost bent on covering Daten City in feces. "Death Race 2010": Panty and Stocking chase after a Ghost with the ability to possess vehicles. However, Panty's underwear (which transform into her weapon) get stuck on the Ghost's head, making it difficult to get them back without damaging them.
2	2	"The Turmoil of the Beehive"; Transliteration: "Mitsubachi no Zawameki" (Japanese: ミツバチのざわめき)	Directed by : Hiroaki Tomita; Storyboarded by : Atsushi Nishigori	Hiromi Wakabayashi	Hirokazu Kojima	October 9, 2010
2	2	"Sex and the Daten City"; Transliteration: "Sekkusu ando za Daten Shiti" (Japanese: セックス・アンド・ザ・ダテンシティ)	Shōko Nakamura	Hiroshi Seko	Shōko Nakamura	October 9, 2010
"The Turmoil of the Beehive": Panty and Stocking investigate a series of disappearances at Daten City High School, where they usurp the status of school queen bee from Queen Barby, the cheerleading team captain. With the help of Brief, a teenage occult geek and amateur Ghost hunter, Panty and Stocking discover Barby is the Ghost behind the school's disappearances. "Sex and the Daten City": At the preview of her and Stocking's first feature film, Panty screens a pornographic film she once starred in, which leaks to the public. With her celebrity lifestyle at risk, Panty travels the world with Stocking and destroys every copy of the tape except for one, which the sisters decide to keep for themselves. When Panty reveals she edited out all of Stocking's scenes in their film, however, Stocking gets revenge by uploading the last tape online.
3	3	"Catfight Club"; Transliteration: "Kyattofaito Kurabu" (Japanese: キャットファイト・クラブ)	Sayo Yamamoto	Masahiko Otsuka	Masahito Onoda	October 16, 2010
3	3	"Pulp Addiction"; Transliteration: "Parupu Adikushon" (Japanese: パルプ・アディクション)	Directed by : Masahiko Otsuka; Storyboarded by : Shinji Higuchi	Shigeto Koyama	Yusuke Yoshigaki	October 16, 2010
"Catfight Club": Panty and Stocking get into a heated argument over a missing cup of pudding and go their separate ways. However, they are forced to put their differences aside to defeat a pair of Ghosts who work as a team. "Pulp Addiction": The Ghosts of vengeful sperm cause a shortage of tissue paper, rendering the men in Daten City incapable of wiping themselves after ejaculating.
4	4	"The Diet Syndrome"; Transliteration: "Daietto Shindorōmu" (Japanese: ダイエット・シンドローム)	Directed by : Hiroaki Tomita; Storyboarded by : Daizen Komatsuda	Masahiko Otsuka	Kōichi Motomura	October 23, 2010
4	4	"High School Nudical"; Transliteration: "Hai Sukūru Nūdikaru" (Japanese: ハイスクール・ヌーディカル)	Directed by : Masaharu Tomoda; Storyboarded by : Ryouji Masuyama	Hiromi Wakabayashi	Ryouji Masuyama	October 23, 2010
"The Diet Syndrome": Stocking finds herself gaining weight and goes on an intense diet, but she only keeps getting fatter until she balloons into a giant. When the cause is revealed to be from an obese Ghost who refuses to diet, Stocking sets out for revenge. Upon defeating the Ghost, Stocking returns to her original figure. "High School Nudical": Daten City High School holds a lingerie run in which participants must race in their underwear. The run is interrupted by a Ghost who eats underwear, including Panty and Stocking's weapons, so Panty must resort to using whatever underwear she can find.
5	5	"Raiders of the Nasal Dark" ("The Runny") (Note: The segment's title references the Japanese title for The Mummy, which translates back into English as Hamunaptra: The Lost City of the Desert (ハムナプトラ/失われた砂漠の都, Hamunaputora: Ushinawareta Sabaku no Miyako).); Transliteration: "Hanamuputora" (Japanese: ハナムプトラ)	Shin Itagaki	Hiroyuki Imaishi & Shin Itagaki	Kōichi Motomura	October 30, 2010
5	5	"Vomiting Point"; Transliteration: "Vomittingu Pointo" (Japanese: ヴォミッティング・ポイント)	Osamu Kobayashi	Hiroshi Seko	Takashi Mukouda	October 30, 2010
"Raiders of the Nasal Dark": A recreational nose-picking fad spreads across Daten City thanks to a man named Oscar H. Genius, who invites the citizens of Daten City to a blimp party. However, Genius turns out to be a Ghost intent on ramming the blimp into the moon using the passengers' collective nosebleeds. "Vomiting Point": In the gloomy town of Little Tokyo neighboring Daten City, a struggling office worker named Terao is denied his chance to attend his young daughter's birthday party and forced by his co-workers to drink a mountain of beer, causing him to create a Ghost made of vomit. Panty and Stocking defeat the Ghost and decide to help Terao with his troubles by giving him their autographs as a present for his daughter, who is an avid fan of the Anarchy sisters.
6	6	"Les Diaboliques"; Transliteration: "Akuma no Yō na Onna-tachi" (Japanese: 悪魔のような女たち)	Directed by : Masahiko Otsuka; Storyboarded by : Hiroyuki Imaishi	Masahiko Otsuka	Atsushi Nishigori	November 6, 2010
Panty and Stocking arrive at school to find that a strict academic regime has been established by the mayor's daughters, Scanty and Kneesocks, and are banished to the lowest class in school. Together with Brief, Panty and Stocking discover that Scanty and Kneesocks are demons who are running a factory that produces an army of fake Ghosts beneath the school. A destructive battle ensues, with the Anarchy sisters defeating the Demon sisters by destroying the stone that powers the factory.
7	7	"Trans-homers"; Transliteration: "Toransuhōmu" (Japanese: トランスホーム)	Akira Amemiya	Hiromi Wakabayashi	Akira Amemiya	November 13, 2010
7	7	"The Stripping" ("Stake Your Naked Body on Cash") (Note: The segment's title references the Japanese title for The Killing, which translates back into English as Stake Your Body on Cash (現金に体を張れ, Gennama ni Karada o Hare).); Transliteration: "Gennama ni Ratai o Hare" (Japanese: 現金に裸体を張れ)	Satoshi Yamaguchi	Masahiko Otsuka	Satoshi Yamaguchi	November 13, 2010
"Trans-homers": Panty and Stocking's sibling feud escalates into all-out war when they eat the cores of two warring alien robots and transform into robots themselves. When the alien robots decide to join forces to destroy the human race and merge into a Ghost, Panty and Stocking are once again forced to work together to defeat the Ghost. "The Stripping": Garterbelt gets angry at Panty and Stocking for wasting money, so the sisters make a bet to raise $3 million in three days. Getting jobs proves difficult for them, so they resort to going to a casino run by Scanty and Kneesocks, who rig their games to ensure the angels will lose. The Anarchy sisters eventually run out of money, but by selling their clothes to onlookers, they manage to play long enough to break through the Demon sisters' scheme and earn their $3 million.
8	8	"...Of the Dead"; Transliteration: "...Obu za Deddo" (Japanese: ...オブ・ザ・デッド)	Ryuichi Kimura	Hiroshi Seko	Yusuke Yoshigaki	November 20, 2010
8	8	"1 Angry Ghost"; Transliteration: "Ippiki no Ikareru Gōsuto" (Japanese: 一匹の怒れるゴースト)	Daizen Komatsuda	Masahiko Otsuka	Ikuo Kuwana	November 20, 2010
"...Of the Dead": Panty and Stocking are holed up in a town where Scanty and Kneesocks have unleashed a horde of zombies that are immune to the Anarchy sisters' weapons, until they turn on the Demon sisters and turn the entire city into zombies. "1 Angry Ghost": The disguised Demon sisters put Panty and Stocking on trial for the murder of a friendly Ghost, with a monkey wearing a translation device on its head serving as the sisters' defense attorney. The sisters are found guilty and sentenced to electrocution, which jolts the monkey lawyer's translation device and grants him heightened intelligence, allowing him to prove the sisters' innocence and implicate the murdered Ghost's wife as the true culprit.
9	9	"If the Angels Wore Swimsuits" (Note: The segment's title references the Japanese title for Urban Marine Resort Story, which translates back into English as If She Wore a Swimsuit (彼女が水着にきがえたら, Kanojo ga Mizugi ni Kigaetara).); Transliteration: "Tenshi ga Mizugi ni Kigaetara" (Japanese: 天使が水着にきがえたら)	Directed by : Ryo-timo; Storyboarded by : Atsushi Nishigori	Masahiko Otsuka	Ryo-timo	November 27, 2010
9	9	"Ghost: The Phantom of Daten City" (Note: The segment's title references the Japanese title for Ghost, which translates back into English as Ghost: The Phantom of New York (ゴースト/ニューヨークの幻, Gōsuto: Nyū Yōku no Maboroshi).); Transliteration: "Gōsuto: Daten Shiti no Maboroshi" (Japanese: ゴースト〜ダテンシティの幻〜)	Directed by : Ryuichi Kimura; Storyboarded by : Kazuya Tsurumaki	Masahiko Otsuka	Satoshi Yamaguchi	November 27, 2010
"If the Angels Wore Swimsuits": Panty and Stocking once again face off against Scanty and Kneesocks, this time in a volleyball match to determine who will control the public beach. The Anarchy sisters win, but the Demon sisters unleash a horde of aquatic Ghosts to wreak havoc before making a getaway. "Ghost: The Phantom of Daten City": Stocking falls in love with a repulsive and ill-mannered Ghost and is willing to forsake her duties as an angel in order to be with him. Concerned for her sister, Panty attempts to kill the Ghost, but he proves to reciprocate Stocking's feelings and proposes to her. The moment Stocking accepts, however, the Ghost finds himself at peace and ascends to Heaven.
10	10	"Inner Brief"; Transliteration: "Innā Burīfu" (Japanese: インナーブリーフ)	Directed by : Nobutake Ito; Storyboarded by : Masayuki	Hiromi Wakabayashi	Nobutake Ito	December 4, 2010
10	10	"Chuck to the Future"; Transliteration: "Chakku tu za Fyūchā" (Japanese: チャック・トゥ・ザ・フューチャー)	Hiroaki Tomita	Shigeto Koyama	Tomoko Sugidomari	December 4, 2010
10	10	"Chuck to the Future Part 2"; Transliteration: "Chakku tu za Fyūchā Pāto Tsū" (Japanese: チャック・トゥ・ザ・フューチャー PART2)	Directed by : Sanzigen; Storyboarded by : Shinji Higuchi	Shigeto Koyama	Sanzigen	December 4, 2010
10	10	"Chuck to the Future Part 3"; Transliteration: "Chakku tu za Fyūchā Pāto Surī" (Japanese: チャック・トゥ・ザ・フューチャー PART3)	Directed by : Masahiko Otsuka; Storyboarded by : Nobutoshi Ogura	Shigeto Koyama	Nobutoshi Ogura	December 4, 2010
10	10	"Help! We Are Angels"; Transliteration: "Herupu! Futari wa Enjeru" (Japanese: HELP!二人はエンジェル)	Atsushi Nishigori	Atsushi Nishigori	Hirokazu Kojima	December 4, 2010
"Inner Brief": Panty and Stocking are shrunken down and wind up inside Brief's body where they wreak havoc. "Chuck to the Future": The second segment is a trilogy of shorts starring Panty and Stocking's pet sidekick, Chuck. "Help! We Are Angels": The third segment is a music video featuring the main characters performing "D City Rock feat. Debra Zeer".
11	11	"Once Upon a Time in Garterbelt"; Transliteration: "Wansu Apon a Taimu in Gātāberuto" (Japanese: ワンス・アポン・ア・タイム・イン・ガーターベルト)	Yoh Yoshinari	Hiromi Wakabayashi	Yoh Yoshinari	December 11, 2010
11	11	"Nothing to Room"; Transliteration: "Nasshingu tu Rūmu" (Japanese: ナッシング・トゥ・ルーム)	Directed by : Shouko Nishigaki; Storyboarded by : Tadashi Hiramatsu	Hiroshi Seko	Shouko Nishigaki	December 11, 2010
"Once Upon a Time in Garterbelt": Panty and Stocking suspect Garterbelt of engaging in sexual activities behind their backs and search for incriminating evidence to use against him. They instead find Garterbelt's diary, which details his past life as a crime lord before he was killed and forced by God to live through all of history until he agreed to become His missionary. "Nothing to Room": Panty and Stocking spend the entire day in their living room, discussing various things while waiting for Garterbelt to make them dinner.
12	12	"D.C. Confidential"; Transliteration: "Dī.Shī. Konfidensharu" (Japanese: D.C.コンフィデンシャル)	Directed by : Hiromi Wakabayashi; Storyboarded by : Hiroyuki Imaishi	Hiroshi Seko	Hirokazu Kojima	December 18, 2010
12	12	"Panty + Brief"; Transliteration: "Panti ando Burīfu" (Japanese: パンティ+ブリーフ)	Directed by : Masahiko Otsuka; Storyboarded by : Atsushi Nishigori	Hiromi Wakabayashi	Yusuke Yoshigaki	December 18, 2010
"D.C. Confidential": Scanty and Kneesocks report the results of their unsuccessful battles with Panty and Stocking, as well as the whereabouts of the blood kin of Hell's Monkey, to Corset, the mayor of Daten City. "Panty + Brief": Panty and Stocking have collected enough Heaven Coins to be allowed back into Heaven. However, only Stocking is taken back while Panty is forced to repeat her duties on Earth and forbidden from having sex as punishment for her immoral behavior. To cheer her up, Brief invites her to a party where he is to be engaged to the mayor's daughter (Scanty in disguise) and instead announces his intention to marry Panty. Scanty and Kneesocks attack Panty, who begins losing her angelic powers and escapes with Brief. Panty decides to have sex with Brief, but finds herself unable to do so as she has regained her virginity. Corset and the Demon sisters appear and kidnap Brief, the blood kin of Hell's Monkey whose penis is the key to Hell's Gate, leaving Panty powerless to save him.
13	13	"Bitch Girls"; Transliteration: "Bitchi Gāruzu" (Japanese: ビッチガールズ)	Directed by : Hiroyuki Imaishi; Storyboarded by : Masahiko Otsuka	Hiromi Wakabayashi	Sushio	December 25, 2010
13	13	"Bitch Girls: 2 Bitch"; Transliteration: "Bitchi Gāruzu: Tsū Bitchi" (Japanese: ビッチガールズ 2ビッチ)	Hiroyuki Imaishi	Hiromi Wakabayashi	Sushio	December 25, 2010
"Bitch Girls": Panty is kicked out by Garterbelt and moves onto a farm, where she delusionally lives as an unrelated old woman's granddaughter. Secretly hired by Garterbelt to restore Panty's confidence, the woman persuades her to stop Corset from unlocking Hell's Gate. Panty has sex with Brief, losing her virginity and restoring her powers. Stocking returns to help Panty fight Corset and the Demon sisters. "Bitch Girls: 2 Bitch": Brief accidentally unlocks Hell's Gate, unleashing a massive Ghost. Corset kills Garterbelt and merges with the Ghost to invade Heaven. Panty and Stocking use Garterbelt's credit card to buy countless weapons from Heaven and form a massive laser with which to defeat Corset. However, they accidentally fire it backwards into the sky, though it instead summons their mother, who destroys Corset and pushes the Ghost back into Hell's Gate, which is sealed. Garterbelt returns to life to continue watching over the Anarchy sisters, who are once again kicked out of Heaven for maxing out his credit card. Upon returning home, Stocking abruptly cuts Panty into 666 pieces and claims to be a demon, while Corset returns in a minuscule form to reenact his plan in the neighboring Oten City.

=== OVA (2011) ===
No.	Title	Directed by	Written by	Animation directed by	Original release date
OVA	"Panty & Stocking in Sanitarybox"	Hiroyuki Imaishi	Hiromi Wakabayashi, Shigeto Koyama & Masahiko Otsuka	Atsushi Nishigori	April 28, 2011
"Heroine Interview" (ヒロインインタビュー, Hiroin Intabyū) – Panty is invited to perform the opening pitch of a baseball game, but she misinterprets the invitation and instead sticks the ball in a different opening.; "Geek of the Dead" (ギーク・オブ・ザ・デッド, Gīku obu za Deddo) – In the sequel to "...Of the Dead", Brief goes on a date with the zombified Panty, who swallows him whole and defecates him into a zombie.; "Map of the Daten City" (マップ・オブ・ザ・ダテンシティ, Mappu obu za Daten Shiti) – Garterbelt gives a tour of Daten City while taking part in sexual activities with young boys.; "Chuck to the Future Part 4" (チャック・トゥ・ザ・フューチャー PART4, Chakku tu za Fyūchā Pāto Fō) – An additional installment to the three-part "Chuck to the Future" segment in which Chuck navigates a Super Mario Bros.-style video game world.; "Brothers of the Roundhead" (ブラザーズ・オブ・ザ・ラウンドヘッド, Burazāzu obu za Raundoheddo) – The secret ingredient of a particular snack is revealed.; "District B" (第B地区, Dai-Bī Chiku) – Garterbelt plays with one of his nipples in the bathtub.; "The Bad Hairdresser's Wife" (髪結いの悪妻, Kamiyui no Akusai) – Panty messes around with Stocking's hair after she gets a piece of chewing gum stuck in it.; "Bitch Flash" (ビッチフラッシュ, Bitchi Furasshu) – Panty and Stocking's transformation sequence is distorted through flash animation.

=== New Panty & Stocking with Garterbelt (2025) ===
No. overall	No. in series	Title	Directed by	Written by	Animation directed by	Original release date
14	1	"Panty & Stocking: Homecoming"; Transliteration: "Panti ando Sutokkingu: Hōmukamingu" (Japanese: パンティ アンド ストッキング ホームカミング)	Directed by : Akira Furukawa; Storyboarded by : Hiroyuki Imaishi	Story by : Hiromi Wakabayashi; Teleplay by : Kimiko Ueno	Sushio & Masaru Sakamoto	July 10, 2025
Garterbelt, Brief, Chuck, Scanty, and Kneesocks unite to collect Panty's pieces and defeat Corset, who is responsible for brainwashing Stocking into believing she is a demon. En route to Oten City, Corset's spell transforms Stocking into a giant, rampaging demon that breaks free from his control to devour buildings she mistakes for sweets. Garterbelt resurrects Panty once her pieces are assembled, but she returns with a demure personality unsuited to fighting Stocking. After Scanty and Kneesocks use magic lotion from Hell to grow Panty to enormous size, the group notices they forgot to include the piece with her vagina, which embodies her true self. Brief delivers the missing piece to Panty with the others' help, fully restoring her. Panty and Stocking engage in a vicious battle, destroying their giant forms in the process, but reconcile after remembering their previous plans for sex and a movie, respectively. Garterbelt invites the homeless Scanty and Kneesocks to live at Cemetery Hills, while Corset is run over and killed by Panty. Later, Garterbelt communicates via phone with the king of Hell.
15	2	"Bitch Girls 4 Life"; Transliteration: "Bitchi Gāruzu Fō Raifu" (Japanese: ビッチガールズフォー・ライフ)	Directed by : Yuichi Shimodaira; Storyboarded by : Hiroyuki Imaishi	Hiroyuki Imaishi & Rino Yamazaki	Hiroki Arai	July 17, 2025
15	2	"The Bodycard"; Transliteration: "Bodikādo" (Japanese: ボディカード)	Directed by : Yuichi Shimodaira; Storyboarded by : Akira Amemiya	Story by : Hiromi Wakabayashi; Teleplay by : Rino Yamazaki	Akihiro Satō & Shunpei Gunyasu	July 17, 2025
"Bitch Girls 4 Life": As requested by the king of Hell, Scanty and Kneesocks' father, Garterbelt appoints the Demon Sisters with joining Panty and Stocking's mission to stop an exodus of Ghosts from Hell's Gate, which will grant the sisters Hell Coins to allow their re-entry into Hell. The Anarchy and Demon Sisters compete to hunt a pair of Ghosts made of water and cooking oil at a diner, but when they accidentally trigger an oil explosion that fuses the Ghosts into one, the four work together to destroy the combined spirit, rewarding both sibling pairs with one coin each. "The Bodycard": Panty is forced to pay three trillion Daten City dollars in collateral damage she caused during her battle with Stocking. To raise the money, Brief secures a job for Panty at a trading card game store, where she wins a game against a Ghost for a one-of-a-kind card worth the precise cost. When the card is suddenly reprinted and loses its value, Panty sells the card and her underwear to Brief for the required funds, only to then squander the money in a shopping spree.
16	3	"Project S: The Worst Ever Dojo" (Note: The segment's title references the Japanese title for Vajont, which translates back into English as Project V: The Worst Ever Dam Disaster (プロジェクトV 史上最悪のダム災害, Purojekuto Bui: Shijō Saiaku no Damu Saigai). Additionally, the title card itself is a parody of the theatrical poster for Project A.); Transliteration: "Purojekuto Esu: Shijō Saiaku no Dōjō" (Japanese: プロジェクトS 史上最悪の道場)	Directed by : Yuki Kawano; Storyboarded by : Nobutoshi Ogura	Hiromi Wakabayashi & Rino Yamazaki	Yusuke Yoshigaki	July 24, 2025
16	3	"Bitch Perfect"; Transliteration: "Bitchi Pāfekuto" (Japanese: ビッチ・パーフェクト)	Sae Ōtani	Rino Yamazaki	Aoi Abe	July 24, 2025
16	3	"F*ck & Furious"	Directed by : Kōdai Nakano; Storyboarded by : Hiroyuki Imaishi	Shigeto Koyama	Yoshitaka Mano	July 24, 2025
"Project S: The Worst Ever Dojo": Feeling belittled by Panty, Stocking teams up with Scanty to kill a ninja Ghost masquerading as the head of Daten City's samurai dojo. Despite their quarreling, the two defeat the Ghost after Scanty encourages Stocking to appreciate Panty's sisterly love for her, allowing her to forgive Panty. "Bitch Perfect": The Anarchy and Demon Sisters become addicted to a photo-sharing app that causes them to orgasm over the likes they receive. The app soon spawns a Ghost that absorbs the four to feed on their craving for validation until it explodes from their pleasure after the incident is broadcast on television. "F*ck & Furious": A crew of sperm makes a perilous drive from a used tissue to Panty's uterus.
17	4	"Daten City President"; Transliteration: "Daten Shiti Purejidento" (Japanese: ダテンシティ・プレジデント)	Yostar Pictures	Kimiko Ueno	Rio	July 31, 2025
17	4	"Pet Cemetery Hills"; Transliteration: "Petto Semetarī Hiruzu" (Japanese: ペット・セメタリーヒルズ)	Yostar Pictures	Story by : Hiromi Wakabayashi; Teleplay by : Rino Yamazaki	Rio	July 31, 2025
17	4	"Shoot for Yesterday!" (Note: The segment's title references the Japanese title for Butch Cassidy and the Sundance Kid, which translates back into English as Shoot for Tomorrow! (明日に向って撃て!, Asu ni Mukatte Ute!).); Transliteration: "Kinō ni Mukatte Ute!" (Japanese: 昨日に向って撃て！)	Kai Ikarashi	Kai Ikarashi	Kai Ikarashi	July 31, 2025
"Daten City President": Panty is sentenced to death after breaking a recent sex law passed by the president of Daten City. At Brief's suggestion, Stocking runs for president to repeal the law and save Panty, which leads to her killing the incumbent president after ousting him as a Ghost conman. Although Stocking loses the election in a landslide, Panty is pardoned by the winning candidate: the Anarchy sisters' car, See-Through. "Pet Cemetery Hills": Panty destroys the gravestone of a dead cat, which returns as harmless Ghost kitten. Learning the Ghost is too small to be worth a whole Heaven Coin, Panty names it Vibe and overfeeds it with the intent to kill it once it has grown, but changes her mind after becoming emotionally attached to it. After reaching maturity, Vibe finds peace with Panty's love and passes on into Heaven, after which Panty builds Vibe a new grave marker out of vibrators. "Shoot for Yesterday!": The Anarchy and Demon Sisters battle a space-traveling Ghost cube that uses dots to gradually convert the universe into a lifeless reality resembling a comic book in the art styles of Stan Lee and Jack Kirby. With the help of a space Ghost hunter, Panty shoots a bullet back in time and destroys the Ghost before it lands in Daten City. The present-day Panty receives a Heaven Coin from the Ghost while the future Panty becomes a space Ghost hunter herself.
18	5	"Rolling Sisters"; Transliteration: "Rōringu Shisutāzu" (Japanese: ローリングシスターズ)	Directed by : Kōdai Nakano; Storyboarded by : Shō Ōi	Story by : Shō Ōi; Teleplay by : Kimiko Ueno	Shō Ōi & Akihiro Satō	August 7, 2025
18	5	"Mutant Garterbelts"; Transliteration: "Myūtanto Gātāberutozu" (Japanese: ミュータントガーターベルトズ)	Masaoki Nakajima	Kimiko Ueno	Akari Takei & Atsuya Deguchi	August 7, 2025
18	5	"Bitch Serial Killer!" (Note: The segment's title references the Japanese title for Blood and Black Lace, which translates back into English as Model Serial Killer! (モデル連続殺人!, Moderu Renzoku Satsujin!).); Transliteration: "Bitchi Renzoku Satsujin!" (Japanese: ビッチ連続殺人！)	Akira Furukawa	Akira Furukawa	Yusuke Yoshigaki	August 7, 2025
"Rolling Sisters": The Ghost of a restless sushi chef causes a hurricane to strike Daten City while Scanty is using the toilet. Unwilling to relieve herself in public, Scanty produces a demonic supercell from her building urge to defecate, allowing her to destroy the Ghost. "Mutant Garterbelts": Garterbelt takes pity on the Ghost of an abandoned pet turtle, which causes the Ghost to possess him and transform into a kaiju-sized monster that births a legion of clones of himself. He returns to normal after the Anarchy Sisters destroy the Ghost, but is then possessed by an egg-laying platypus Ghost. "Bitch Serial Killer!": Panty is targeted by a serial killer of blonde-haired, promiscuous women, whose deaths resemble the opening scenes of B horror films. While disguised as Panty for her protection, Brief is attacked by a Ghost believed to be the culprit, only to discover the Ghost uses props to commit fake murders. Brief traces the Ghost to the real killer: a retired blonde scream queen who resents being typecast as opening horror victims, with the Ghost being a manifestation of her hatred. Inspired by Brief's defense of B movies, the Ghost kills the actress with an axe and passes on.
19	6	"The Brothers from Heaven" ("The Angel Brothers Appear") (Note: The segment's title references the Japanese title for The Beast from 20,000 Fathoms, which translates back into English as The Atomic Monster Appears (原子怪獣現わる, Genshi Kaijū Arawaru).); Transliteration: "Tenshi Kyōdai Arawaru" (Japanese: 天使兄弟現わる)	Directed by : Yuki Kawano; Storyboarded by : Hiroyuki Imaishi	Story by : Hiroyuki Imaishi & Hiromi Wakabayashi; Teleplay by : Kimiko Ueno	Ichigo Kanno & Shimon Dohi	August 14, 2025
Panty and Stocking's cousins, the Newgen Angel brothers Polyester and Polyurethane, arrive in Daten City to replace them as the city's guardians, revoking the sisters' Ghost-hunting licenses and placing safety locks on their weapons for abusing their freedoms on Earth. To combat the brothers, the sisters and their allies meet with the lingerie arms dealer Gunsmith Bitch, who removes the locks and sells them new gear to match the brothers' technologically superior arsenal. After the Anarchy and Demon Sisters defeat the brothers in a chaotic Ghost-hunting competition, the brothers are taken back to Heaven by their father, Ramie, who reinstates the Anarchy Sisters' licenses, while Gunsmith Bitch takes the sisters' newly obtained Heaven Coins as payment. Rather than punish his sons, Ramie permits them to continue their operation against the Anarchy Sisters.
20	7	"Independence Dick"; Transliteration: "Indipendensu Dikku" (Japanese: インデペンデンス・ディック)	Directed by : Kōdai Nakano; Storyboarded by : Nobutoshi Ogura	Story by : Hiromi Wakabayashi; Teleplay by : Rino Yamazaki	Hiroki Arai	August 21, 2025
20	7	"Longest Bitch Yard"; Transliteration: "Rongesuto Bitchi Yādo" (Japanese: ロンゲスト・ビッチヤード)	Directed by : Yoshihiro Miyajima; Storyboarded by : Yoh Yoshinari	Kimiko Ueno	Yoh Yoshinari, Yusuke Yoshigaki & Takafumi Chida	August 21, 2025
"Independence Dick": Garterbelt, Brief, and Chuck take a road trip to Casino City, fed up with the Anarchy and Demon Sisters' demands. After Garterbelt crashes their car, they are driven there by the off-duty Newgen Angels, who bond with them. During a sudden Ghost attack, the sisters arrive simply to berate the trio for leaving, while the brothers only destroy the Ghost after their break is over, stating their friendship with the trio has no impact on their work, leaving the trio feeling unappreciated once more. "Longest Bitch Yard": The Anarchy and Demon Sisters are arrested for various crimes and sent to an all-women's prison, which is secretly a Ghost that feeds off its inmates' "bitchiness". The four agree to team up for a prison American football tournament in which the winners will be acquitted, but the Ghost separately bribes each teammate to throw the game. Upon learning the deception, the four destroy the Ghost by working together and winning the game.
21	8	"Break the Internet" (Note: The segment's title references the Japanese title for Fear and Loathing in Las Vegas, which translates back into English as Break Las Vegas (ラスベガスをやっつけろ, Rasu Begasu o Yattsukero).); Transliteration: "Intānetto wa Yattsukero" (Japanese: インターネットをやっつけろ)	Akira Amemiya	Akira Amemiya	Yuko Hishinuma	August 28, 2025
21	8	"The Silence of the Internets"; Transliteration: "Intānetto-tachi no Chinmoku" (Japanese: インターネットたちの沈黙)	Akira Amemiya	Akira Amemiya	Yuko Hishinuma	August 28, 2025
21	8	"Fa Fa F*ck"; Transliteration: "Fa Fa Fakku" (Japanese: ファ・ファ・フ*ック)	Directed by : Kōdai Nakano; Storyboarded by : Hiroyuki Imaishi	Hiroyuki Imaishi & Rino Yamazaki	Shunpei Gunyasu, Akihiro Satō & Yoshitaka Mano	August 28, 2025
"Break the Internet": In the "first episode" of a police serial, rookie police officer Impact Cop is dispatched to find the root of evil in Daten City. He quickly determines the evil to be the Internet itself, which he destroys with Panty and Stocking's aid after discovering it is actually a Ghost. "The Silence of the Internets": In the serial's "last episode", Impact Cop's superintendent general is murdered and the police station destroyed by a monster claiming to be the true root of all evil. Impact Cop is disheartened, but accepts his responsibilities by using the Internet Ghost to capture the "evil" before incinerating both. "Fa Fa F*ck": Garterbelt reports Panty's incessant profanity to Heaven's censors, who fit her with a tongue ring that severs and regrows her tongue whenever she swears. However, she gains the ability to sing profane words as a loophole when her tongue is possessed by the Ghost of a musical film's rising star. She enjoys a successful musical career that helps the Ghost pass on, but Garterbelt has the ring's effects switched after she incites an orgy with her singing.
22	9	"The Ohagi of Doom" ("Great Confectionary Pass") (Note: The segment's title references the Japanese title for The Sword of Doom, which translates back into English as Great Bodhisattva Pass (大菩薩峠, Dai Bosatsu Tōge).); Transliteration: "Dai Okashi Tōge" (Japanese: 大御菓子峠)	Directed by : Yuki Kawano; Storyboarded by : Ichigo Kanno	Story by : Hiroyuki Imaishi & Ichigo Kanno; Teleplay by : Kimiko Ueno	Ichigo Kanno	September 4, 2025
22	9	"Not 2 Home Alone"; Transliteration: "Notto Tsū Hōmu Arōn" (Japanese: ノット・2・ホーム・アローン)	Shimon Dohi	Story by : Hiromi Wakabayashi & Shimon Dohi; Teleplay by : Rino Yamazaki	Aoi Abe	September 4, 2025
22	9	"Six Hundred Sixty Six Candles"	Directed by : Yuki Kawano; Storyboarded by : Yoshihiro Miyajima	Hiromi Wakabayashi	Hiroki Arai, Emi Tamura & Masaru Sakamoto	September 4, 2025
"The Ohagi of Doom": Stocking competes against one hundred million Ghosts in a rock paper scissors tournament for a limited edition ohagi. Gunsmith Bitch sells her a colossal sword to vanquish the Ghost horde, but eats the last ohagi as part of her payment before Stocking can try it. "Not 2 Home Alone:" The Newgen Angels infiltrate the Anarchy Sisters' home after sending them on a wild goose chase, but due to various mishaps and compromising situations in the sisters' rooms, the other tenants mistake them for the sisters themselves. "Six Hundred Sixty Six Candles": Scanty disappears on Kneesocks' 666th birthday, breaking her childhood promise to attend every year. To cheer her up, Panty brings Kneesocks to Brief's high school prom, which is attacked by a man-eating Ghost. When the Ghost destroys Kneesocks' glasses, her first birthday present from Scanty, Panty helps Kneesocks kill the Ghost. Scanty emerges from the Ghost's remains, revealed to have been eaten while shopping for Kneesocks' latest present, a new pair of glasses.
23	10	"The Sex from Another World" (Note: The segment's title references the Japanese title for The Thing, which translates back into English as The X-Thing from Another World (遊星からの物体X, Yūsei kara no Buttai Ekkusu).); Transliteration: "Yūsei kara no Buttai Sekkusu" (Japanese: 遊星からの物体SEX)	Directed by : Akira Furukawa; Storyboarded by : Nobutoshi Ogura	Hiroyuki Imaishi & Rino Yamazaki	Hiroki Harada & Yuko Hishinuma	September 11, 2025
23	10	"Lord of the Kokan the Great" (Note: The segment's title partially references the Japanese titles for The Lord of the Rings: The Fellowship of the Ring and Conan the Barbarian, which are respectively Lord of the Ring (ロード・オブ・ザ・リング, Rōdo obu za Ringu) and Conan the Great (コナン・ザ・グレート, Konan za Gurēto).); Transliteration: "Rōdo obu za Kokan za Gurēto" (Japanese: ロード・オブ・ザ・コカン・ザ・グレート)	Directed by : Akira Furukawa; Storyboarded by : Yūto Kaneko	Story by : Takahisa Ishibashi & Yūto Kaneko; Teleplay by : Takahisa Ishibashi	Yūto Kaneko & Yoh Yoshinari	September 11, 2025
The episode's segments are non-canon film pastiches presented by Garterbelt. "The Sex from Another World": Panty, an alien invader, crash-lands on Earth and absorbs the life force of men through sexual intercourse. After being beheaded by Brief, her living head kills him, assimilates with the scientist Stocking, and mortally wounds Garterbelt, the host of another alien investigating Panty. The investigator transfers his mind into Brief and later Chuck to battle the monstrous Panty/Stocking hybrid, sacrificing himself to drag her inside her own black hole-like vagina, which consumes the universe. "Lord of the Kokan the Great": A barbarian warrior (Panty) embarks with her dragon steed (Stocking) to avenge a loved one (Garterbelt) who was killed by a two-headed demon (Scanty and Kneesocks). After traveling with an elf slave (Brief), the warrior reaches the demon's lair and finds her in the form of a dragon. When the demon kills the warrior's dragon, the warrior uses its carcass to kill the demon, fulfilling her revenge.
24	11	"Being Chuck Maldehole"; Transliteration: "Marudechakku no Ana" (Japanese: マルデチャックの穴)	Chigusa Kiyota	Story by : Chigusa Kiyota; Teleplay by : Rino Yamazaki	Takafumi Chida	September 18, 2025
24	11	"Panty Shorts and the Penis of Doom"; Transliteration: "Pantī Shōtsu: Makon no Densetsu" (Japanese: パンティ・ショーツ 魔根の伝説)	Directed by : Kōdai Nakano; Storyboarded by : Shūhei Handa	Story by : Shūhei Handa & Takahisa Ishibashi; Teleplay by : Takahisa Ishibashi	Shūhei Handa, Hiroki Arai, Emi Tamura & Akihiro Satō	September 18, 2025
24	11	"The Plush"; Transliteration: "Za Purasshu" (Japanese: ザ・プラッシュ)	Directed by : Takahide Ejiri; Storyboarded by : Masaoki Nakajima	Story by : Hiromi Wakabayashi; Teleplay by : Kimiko Ueno	Shūjirō Hamakawa, Hyung Sik Shin, Min Hyeon Shim, Zhen Wei He & Jiayi Yan	September 18, 2025
"Being Chuck Maldehole": Brief is trapped underground with Chuck after falling down a mysterious hole. Their search for an exit leads them to a portal that sends Brief back in time to the moment before entering the hole, but also erases his memories of the experience. "Panty Shorts and the Penis of Doom": Garterbelt sends the Anarchy Sisters and Brief to find a lust-inducing artifact in an ancient ruin. When Brief is possessed by the Ghost of women-hating sacrifice victims within the artifact, the Anarchy Sisters rescue him by luring the Ghost out of the ruins and destroying it. "The Plush": Stocking is targeted by a time traveler named Tom Croose Jr., who tries stopping her from repairing her torn Honekoneko plush, which would cause a hostile takeover of intelligent Honekonekos in the future; he is in turn hunted by a robotic Honekoneko from 2029 after Stocking makes an online post about it. To avoid a time paradox, Gunsmith Bitch brings Stocking back in time to have her plush repaired by its creator, Garterbelt, before he is shot by Tom. Stocking returns to an altered present where Garterbelt has stiched Honekoneko's bone decal onto himself while Tom is erased from existence.
25	12	"The Part-Time Job Before Christmas"; Transliteration: "Pāto Taimu Jobu Bifoa Kurisumasu" (Japanese: パートタイムジョブ・ビフォア・クリスマス)	Sae Ōtani	Story by : Hiroyuki Imaishi, Hiromi Wakabayashi & Kimiko Ueno; Teleplay by : Kimiko Ueno	Aoi Abe & Sae Ōtani	September 25, 2025
25	12	"Heaven Wars Episode One – The Family Menace"; Transliteration: "Hevun Wōzu Episōdo Wan – Za Famirī Menasu" (Japanese: HEAVEN WARS エピソード1 THE FAMILY MENACE)	Directed by : Shimon Dohi; Storyboarded by : Nobutoshi Ogura	Story by : Hiroyuki Imaishi & Hiromi Wakabayashi; Teleplay by : Kimiko Ueno	Hiroki Arai, Yusuke Yoshigaki, Aoi Abe & Emi Tamura	September 25, 2025
"The Part-Time Job Before Christmas": On Christmas Eve, Santa Claus injures himself while having sex with Panty and sends Kneesocks to deliver presents in his place. As thanks, he gifts Kneesocks with family tickets to Lingerie Land, where Brief plans to confess his love for Panty. "Heaven Wars Episode One – The Family Menace": Panty and Stocking's parents, Linière and Silk, grant them permission to temporarily return to Heaven. Garterbelt and the Demon sisters are permitted join the sisters for their affiliation, but Brief is denied entry after Panty dismisses him. To the sisters' disgust, their parents asks them to succeed him as rulers of Heaven to prevent a coup following their recently exposed love affairs. However, Ramie revokes his nieces' claim to the throne for living with demons and humans, and tricks Linière into naming him his successor instead, turning him and Silk into statues before destroying them. Brief overhears Ramie's coup from Heaven's border guards before falling back to Earth, where Gunsmith Bitch helps him and Chuck enter Heaven by drinking a death-simulating drug.
26	13	"Heaven Wars Episode Two – Attack of the Uncle"; Transliteration: "Hevun Wōzu Episōdo Tsū – Atakku obu za Ankuru" (Japanese: HEAVEN WARS エピソード2 ATTACK OF THE UNCLE)	Directed by : Akira Furukawa; Storyboarded by : Hiroyuki Imaishi	Story by : Hiroyuki Imaishi & Hiromi Wakabayashi; Teleplay by : Kimiko Ueno	Takafumi Chida, Emi Tamura, Hiroki Arai, Sae Ōtani & Chigusa Kiyota	September 25, 2025
26	13	"Heaven Wars Episode Three – Revenge of the Bitch"; Transliteration: "Hevun Wōzu Episōdo Surī – Ribenji obu za Bitchi" (Japanese: HEAVEN WARS エピソード3 REVENGE OF THE BITCH)	Directed by : Akira Furukawa; Storyboarded by : Hiroyuki Imaishi	Story by : Hiroyuki Imaishi & Hiromi Wakabayashi; Teleplay by : Kimiko Ueno	Akihiro Satō, Yoshitaka Mano, Shunpei Gunyasu & Yūto Kaneko	September 25, 2025
"Heaven Wars Episode Two – Attack of the Uncle": Ramie combines Heaven's gods into a giant statue of himself with which to destroy Earth and Hell. The Anarchy Sisters accidentally knock Garterbelt and the Demon Sisters out of Heaven during an argument; Garterbelt returns to Earth, where he takes the same drug as Brief and Chuck to return to Heaven, only to end up in Hell with the Demon Sisters, whom he persuades to help the angels. Meanwhile, Brief and Chuck reach Heaven and witness the Anarchy Sisters being turned into stone. "Heaven Wars Episode Three – Revenge of the Bitch": Fastener helps Garterbelt and the Demon Sisters reenter Heaven, while Brief protects Panty and Stocking from Ramie, earning Panty's respect. Ramie and the Newgen Angels attempt to destroy the Anarchy Sisters' statue forms, but their Heavenly weapons instead return them to normal. The Anarchy Sisters' group defeats Ramie's group and destroys the statue, freeing the gods. Linière retains his position and sends Ramie on vacation with his sons, while Panty accepts Brief's love confession at Lingerie Land before they are dragged to Hell by its king. Years after they escape Hell and marry, Stocking sends their son Junior and a demon child named Bastard to find the missing Panty and Brief.
