= Honey Mustard =

Honey mustard is a blend of mustard and honey.

Honey Mustard may refer to:

- Honey Mustard (manhwa), a Korean manhwa comic book by Ho-Kyung Yeo
- "Honey Mustard", a 1995 song by Trusty off the album Goodbye, Dr. Fate
- Honey Mustard, a fictional character from the animated film Sausage Party

== See also ==
- "Honey Mustard Waltz", a song by Yoko Kanno for the Japanese TV anime cartoon Kids on the Slope
- Honey Dijon (disambiguation)
- Mustard (disambiguation)
- Honey (disambiguation)
