= Honey Dijon (disambiguation) =

Honey Dijon is an American DJ and producer.

Honey Dijon may also refer to:

- a type of mustard; see dijon mustard
- a variety of rose; see Rosa 'Spek's Centennial'

== See also ==
- Honey Mustard (disambiguation)
- Honey (disambiguation)
- Dijon (disambiguation)
