= Sonic the Fighters =

1996 video game

- Arcade flyer, depicting (from left to right) Espio, Amy, Sonic, Bark and Fang
- Developer: Sega AM2
- Publisher: Sega
- Director: Hiroshi Kataoka
- Producer: Yu Suzuki
- Programmers: Daichi Katagiri; Susumu Morii; Eiji Ikuta; Hiroshi Masui
- Artist: Masahiro Sugiyama
- Composers: Maki Morrow; Takenobu Mitsuyoshi
- Series: Sonic the Hedgehog
- Platforms: Arcade, PlayStation 3, Xbox 360
- Release: May 1996: Arcade; JP: May 1996; WW: 1996 PlayStation 3; NA: November 27, 2012; JP: November 28, 2012; EU: December 5, 2012 Xbox 360; WW: November 28, 2012
- Genre: Fighting
- Modes: Single-player, multiplayer
- Arcade system: Sega Model 2

Sonic the Fighters, (Note: Japanese: ソニック・ザ・ファイターズ, Hepburn: Sonikku za Faitāzu) released outside Japan as Sonic Championship, is a 1996 fighting game developed by Sega AM2 and published by Sega for their Model 2 arcade system. The game pits players in one-on-one battles with a roster of characters from the Sonic the Hedgehog series. Sonic the Fighters was made using the fighting engine for Fighting Vipers (1995), and was the first 3D game in the Sonic series. The idea for a Sonic fighting game was conceived when a Sega AM2 programmer experimented with a 3D Sonic the Hedgehog model in Fighting Vipers, its animation impressing and convincing the Sonic Team to approve the project.

A home console port for the Sega Saturn was announced but ultimately canceled, resulting in the game staying an arcade exclusive until 2005, when it was released as part of the Sonic Gems Collection for GameCube and PlayStation 2. It was re-released again in 2012 for the PlayStation 3 and Xbox 360, featuring new playable characters and an online versus mode. It has since been included as a bonus game in the Yakuza series.

Sonic the Fighters received mixed reviews. Critics praised the graphics, especially the cartoon-like animations, but criticized the gameplay as rudimentary. It was ultimately regarded as disappointing for fans of the fighting game genre, but an obscure novelty for Sonic fans.

== Gameplay ==
Sonic fighting in a match with Knuckles

Sonic the Fighters is a 3D fighting game in which players compete in one-on-one battles with characters from the Sonic the Hedgehog franchise. In the game's scenario, Sonic the Hedgehog and his friends each own one of the Chaos Emeralds. They are holding a fighting tournament to determine who will take the emeralds in order to power a spaceship and stop series antagonists Doctor Robotnik and Metal Sonic from building an evil fortress in space. The original arcade and 2005 release included eight playable characters: Sonic the Hedgehog, Miles "Tails" Prower, Knuckles the Echidna, Amy Rose, Espio the Chameleon, Fang the Sniper, and new characters Bean the Dynamite and Bark the Polar Bear. The 2012 re-release added Metal Sonic, Doctor Robotnik, and Honey the Cat as playable characters, all previously only accessible through hacking into the original arcade version. Honey is based on a character with the same name from Fighting Vipers (1995).

The game employs simple fighting game mechanics. Each character can punch, kick, and use a defensive barrier. Combining these buttons also allows for a variety of special moves unique to each character. The barrier can block attacks, but it can be damaged and eventually be destroyed by an opponent; players have access to limited number of barriers per match. The barrier does not protect from being grabbed or thrown, or from attacks from behind. Players can spend a barrier to temporarily enter "Hyper Mode" which allows them to perform several attacks in quick succession. Some attacks can be avoided by squatting or dodging. Players can also perform a "safe landing" which allows them to recover quickly when thrown or launched into the air.

== Development and release ==
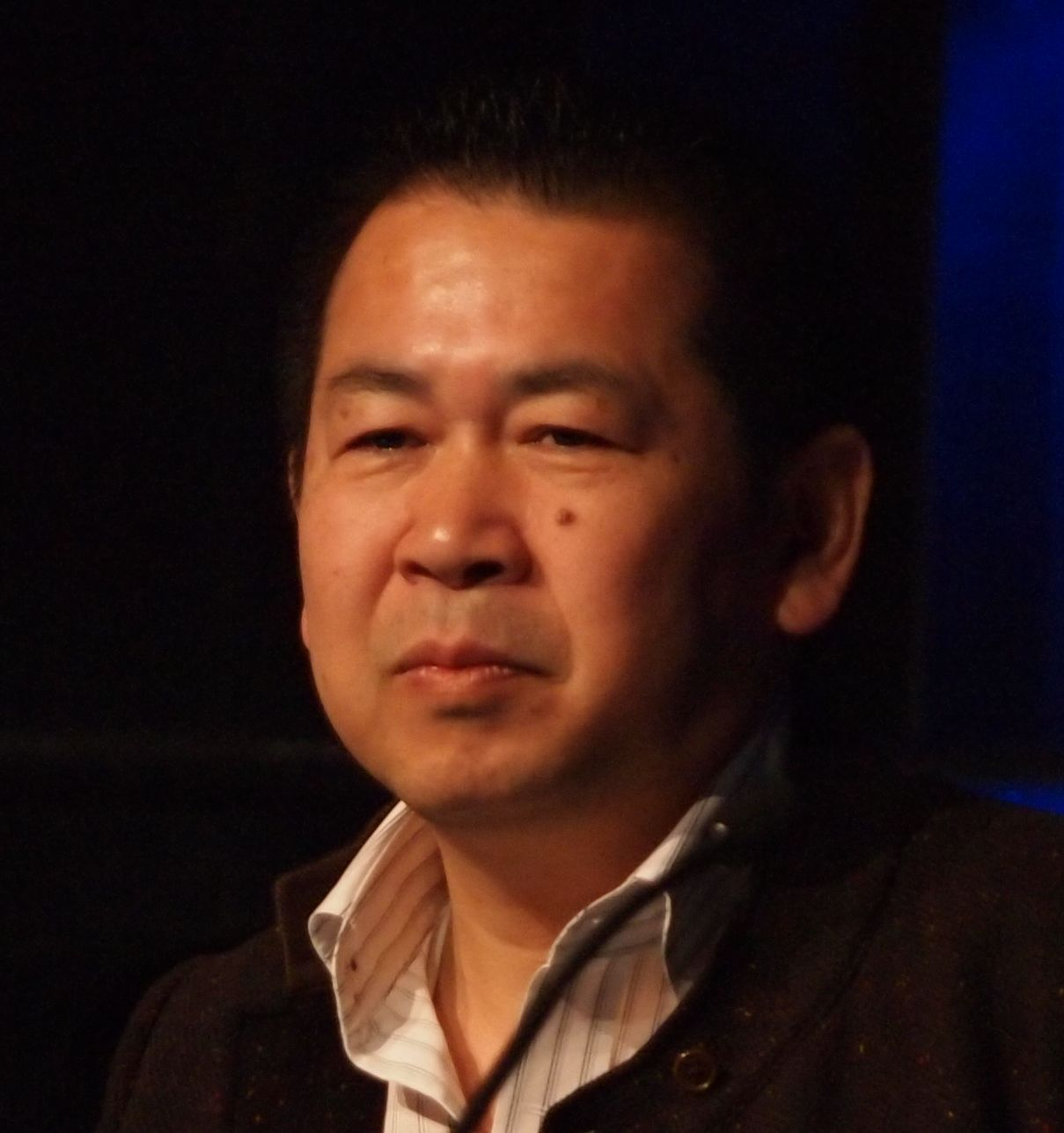
Sonic the Fighters was conceived by producer Yu Suzuki.

Sonic the Fighters was developed by Sega AM2, Sega's arcade game development team behind the Virtua Fighter series. The idea for a Sonic the Hedgehog fighting game was conceived by AM2 lead developer Yu Suzuki who saw character designer Masahiro Sugiyama dabbling with a Sonic the Hedgehog model in AM2's Fighting Vipers. Suzuki pitched the idea for a Sonic fighting game to Hiroshi Kataoka, another one of the heads of AM2. Since Sonic Team was in charge of licensing the Sonic characters, Kataoka had to present the idea to the head of Sonic Team, Yuji Naka. Kataoka was worried Naka would not like the concept of Sonic characters fighting each other, but Naka was receptive. At first, Naka was concerned that Sonic would be unable to fight considering his large head and short arms, but he was delighted after seeing the smooth animation accomplished by Suzuki's team. Original Sonic character designer Naoto Ohshima was also pleased with Sonic's animations. Sega AM2 began development with Sonic Team supervising over the implementation of the characters and setting. They developed for the Sega Model 2 arcade board using the Fighting Vipers engine as a foundation to build from.

Since this was the first time Sonic was being rendered with 3D graphics, Naka gave Kataoka a Sonic figurine to help his team model the character. Suzuki focused his team on modeling the characters' faces correctly so they were instantly recognizable on arcade floors. The development team added in the barrier mechanism because the characters' arms were too small for traditional blocking to look distinct. They also added rings that drop when a player is hit to make it easier for beginners to judge how much damage they were taking instead of referring to the health bar. AM2 explored whether dropped rings could be picked up to restore health or the barrier's power, but ultimately did not include this feature. They made the controls simple to help beginners to the genre.

In early prototypes demonstrated for the press, only Sonic and Tails were shown fighting on an early stage based on Green Hill Zone. Other characters were added later, and Naka personally asked AM2 to create new characters for the Sonic universe. Suzuki jokingly said that anyone who attempted a Sonic game had the duty to create new characters. They conceived two new characters, Bean the Dynamite and Bark the Polar Bear. Bean's design was inspired by the lead character in the Sega arcade game Dynamite Düx (1989). In later years, hackers found Honey from Fighting Vipers was hidden in Sonic the Fighters as a playable character, and modeled as an anthropomorphic cat. Kataoka believes Honey's character designer slipped her in there purposely.

Sonic the Fighters was first released in Japanese arcades in May 1996, followed by a limited release in the West sometime the same year. With its simplified controls, the game was marketed towards beginners, including women and children. In August 2005, it received its first home console release through Sonic Gems Collection, a Sonic games compilation for the GameCube and PlayStation 2. The collection also included Sonic CD, Sonic R, and several Sonic Game Gear titles. In November 2012, Sonic the Fighters was released for the PlayStation 3 and Xbox 360 via each consoles' respective online marketplace. This version added Metal Sonic, Doctor Robotnik, and Honey the Cat as playable characters and featured new online versus modes. Sonic the Fighters is playable at the in-game arcades in Lost Judgment (2021), added as part of the Sonic series' 30th anniversary, and Like a Dragon Gaiden: The Man Who Erased His Name (2023). This version of the game retains the hidden characters from the digital re-releases.

Kataoka stated in 2006 that Sonic the Fighters was the game he was most proud of. Naka also approved of the final product.

=== Abandoned Sega Saturn port ===
In early stages of development, Sega was planning to port Sonic the Fighters to the Sega Saturn. Initial release windows were theorized for late 1996, a few months after the planned arcade release. At the E3 1996 video game convention, a SquareSoft representative was given a private demonstration of new Sega Saturn development software, and reported to the press later that a Saturn version of Sonic the Fighters was shown. In 1997, Computer and Video Games reported a rumor that Sonic the Fighters would release for the Saturn in Japan mid-year and North America a couple months later. In 1998, the Saturn port was still scheduled for release in Japan, though the North American release had since been dropped. Ultimately, a Saturn port was never released. Yojiro Ogawa of Sonic Team said in retrospect that Sonic the Fighters was not ported to the Saturn because it was difficult to reproduce a similar experience to the arcade version. He felt they were able to accomplish this when it was re-released in 2005.

== Reception ==
In Japan, Game Machine listed Sonic the Fighters as the 13th most popular arcade game of June 1996.

After seeing it demonstrated at a Japanese arcade expo, GamePro shared their admiration of the game's cartoon-like animation, comparing it to Looney Tunes. Next Generation gave an average review, praising the visuals but criticizing the gameplay. They believed the backgrounds and character animations were detailed well, but felt that hardcore fighting game fans would be disappointed with the lack of gameplay depth. They concluded by giving the game 3 out of 5 stars, calling it a fun game that "exploits Sonic milieu without feeling too aggressive."

Critics shared mixed thoughts for its 2005 re-release on Sonic Gems Collection. Both IGN and GameSpy called it a stripped-down version of the original Virtua Fighter, and GameSpot believed it was a simplified version of Virtua Fighter 2. The gameplay was criticized, with most reviewers describing it as rudimentary, simple, and dated. The lack of extensive combos and depth to the game's strategy contributed to this. Some critics recommended the game to fans of the Sonic series for the novelty of seeing a sizable roster of Sonic characters fighting with cartoon-like moves, and because this release was the only way to play the game at home at the time.

Xbox 360 reviews

Aggregate score
Aggregator	Score
Metacritic	47/100 (6 reviews)

Review scores
Publication	Score
GamesMaster	50%
Official Xbox Magazine (US)	5.0/10
X360	2/10

The 2012 release received unfavorable reviews. Official Xbox Magazine called it an interesting and obscure release, and a fascinating part of Sega's history, but concluded that it loses traction because of its lack of seriousness as a fighting game. They did, however, praise the cartoon quality of the graphics. They thought the way the characters squashed and stretched was rarely seen and still uncommon even in 2012. GamesMaster felt the game lacked depth to its gameplay compared to other fighting games. X360 criticized its repetitive, simplistic gameplay and lamented how the game "repeatedly discourages the use of skill."
