= Honi =

Honi may refer to:

== People ==
- Honi HaM'agel, Jewish 1st century BCE scholar prior to the age of the Tannaim
- Charles Coles (1911–1992), American actor and tap dancer nicknamed Honi
- Honi Gordon (fl. 1950s–21st century), American jazz singer
- Serge Honi (born 1973), Cameroonian retired footballer
- Salem el-Honi, high commissioner of the Organisation of the Islamic Conference office

== Other uses ==
- Honi, Iran, a village in Kerman Province
- Honi language, spoken in Yunnan, China
- Honi, fictional daughter in the syndicated comic strip Hägar the Horrible
- Honi, Native Hawaiian version of hongi, a traditional Māori greeting

== See also ==
- Honi phenomenon, a psychological effect
- Honey (disambiguation)
