= Hutak =

Hutak or Hutk (Persian: هوتك) may refer to:

- Hutak, Kerman
- Hutak, Ekhtiarabad, Kerman Province
- Hutak, Sistan and Baluchestan
