= Honey (Fighting Vipers) =

Fictional video game character

- Fighting Vipers character
- First game: Fighting Vipers (1995)
- Created by: Hiroshi Kataoka; Masahiro Sugiyama
- Designed by: Masahiro Sugiyama

In-universe information
- Fighting style: "Cat Punch"

Honey (Japanese: ハニー, Hepburn: Hanī) is a character introduced in the 1995 fighting game Fighting Vipers, developed by Sega's AM2 development team. She was created by character designer Masahiro Sugiyama to be a rich young girl and a "cute" counterpart to the game's other female characters. In localized versions of the game, her name was changed to Candy. A variant of the character, Honey the Cat, was playable in Sega's Sonic the Fighters game due to Sugiyama leaving her in the game's code, and developers rediscovering it years later when porting the titles to the Xbox 360 and PlayStation 3.

Honey was well received since her debut and considered a standout character of her series well after. She has been cited as a frequent subject of fan works, particularly cosplay, with stores selling replicas of her costume. The character has also been heavily praised for her sex appeal, which in turn has been noted as helping the success of the original arcade game's release. However, this alongside her portrayal in advertising for the franchise also garnered criticism towards the character regarding her depicted young age and complaints regarding the sexualized depiction of women in gaming as a whole.

== Conception and development ==
When developing the arcade game Fighting Vipers, the Sega AM2 development team wanted to create a more visually "intense" fighting game than their previous efforts. However, they wanted a less bloody presentation than titles such as Midway Games' Mortal Kombat series, and instead went with armored characters whose attire could be broken off and scatter over the arena during the course of the fights. After this was decided, they considered other aspects to tie to the characters such as skateboarding and guitars, elements they felt would be popular with younger players.

Honey was created by Masahiro Sugiyama, one of the game's two character designers. Director Hiroshi Kataoka acknowledged that while Honey's design was a departure from characters normally designed by AM2, unlike others developed for Fighting Vipers which normally undergo a trial and error process, the team immediately took a liking to her. Producer Yu Suzuki added that the game's protagonist was up to whichever character was most popular with fans, and stated "that girl, she's going so far I can't complain". He added that if Honey had just been "half-assed and sexy" he would have had an issue with it, but instead felt the developer had put a lot of effort and visible passion into the character.

=== Design ===
Standing 160 centimetres (5 ft 3 in) tall and established as having a D-cup bust size, Honey is a young woman with long brunette hair tied into twin ponytails on the sides of her head. Her outfit consists of a red dress with white frills around the skirt. Additional frills extend around her lower wrists meeting her white gloves that have a red plate on the back, and also at the base of her ponytails with a red headband arched between them. Her lower legs are covered with red and black stiletto boots that extend to the knees. Black plastic armor extends further up her thighs, while her lower arms to her wrist are similarly covered with large elbow pads. Honey's dress extends halfway up her chest, with a large heart-shaped breastplate on the front. Each shoulder has a large bulbous pauldron, which was added with the intention of making her small body seem larger. The outfit was inspired by bodycon bondage rubber outfits seen in magazines. While initial designs were closer to that concept, they felt it worked against their goal of making a character that would be popular with Japanese men.

Honey was added due to Kataoka wanting to include a "cute" character to contrast against the game's other two implemented female characters, Grace and Jane, who were portrayed as strong and intense. The dress was meant to emphasize softness, made out of pleather due to Sugiyama envisioning Honey as a rich young girl from the game's uptown area and feeling regular attire would be boring. The dress is based on gothic Lolita fashion, made red to emphasize battle while the white frills were meant to convey an image of purity. The emphasis on her cuteness inadvertently made her the hardest character to implement, as extra attention was paid to her face to ensure she remained such through the development process. Additional details about her character such as having poor eyesight and requiring the use of contact lenses were fleshed out in supplemental material to the game for this purpose.

Underneath her armor, Honey wears a leather bustier with exposed cleavage and goes over her shoulders and is fastened with straps, while with similar underwear on her lower body. Two white angel wings protrude from the back of the bustier; when the development team asked about these, the response was "Because she'll be more popular this way." While her full armor was initially intended to be breakable, a female developer expressed that she felt Honey looked "too naked" if the skirt part was removed as well. While Kataoka initially agreed, due to the fact the model was already done he implemented a last minute easter egg into the game where if players achieved 100 consecutive wins with Honey her skirt could now be removed, allowing the player to use her solely in her undergarments. In North American and European regions, her underwear was censored and replaced with black shorts.

=== Alternate designs ===
Two alternate versions of Honey are unlockable in the original game, one dressed in a Hawaiian-themed outfit and armed with a ukelele, while the other is a schoolgirl version of her outfit. Meanwhile, for the game Fighters Megamix, another alternate version dubbed "New Honey" was included. Described as a "bondage high schooler" outfit, it appears as a schoolgirl uniform incorporating various belts wrapped around the arms and legs. While the Japanese Sega Saturn Magazine claimed it was designed by a female member of Sega AM2, Sugiyama later confirmed on social media website Twitter that he was the actual designer.

For the game's sequel Fighting Vipers 2, the characters were redesigned to have a more futuristic art style. Artist Imai Toonz handled most of the character redesigns, and proposed an updated outfit for Honey that featured the heart chestplate either cracked or upside down, intending it to add depth to her character by making the player question why she had designed it like that. However, because Honey was very popular at the time, particularly with cosplayers, Sega wanted to use an outfit that would be easy to replicate and the design went unused. Instead, a different outfit was created internally by Sega AM2, featuring a dark blue dress with large openings along the sides. Blue ribbons adorn the shoulders and knees, while metal brackets surround her wrists and ankles. Her lower arms and shoes were given red highlights, while a red apron was added to the front atop the dress itself, going around her chest and extending to the skirt.

== Appearances ==
Honey first appeared in the 1995 fighting game Fighting Vipers and later returned for Fighting Vipers 2. A fashion designer and cosplayer, she enters the fighting tournaments to showcase her work and make a name for herself, adopting a more serious personality when she puts on her dress. While releases of the original game outside of Japan changed the character's name to Candy, her later appearance in the game's sequel left her name unchanged. She additionally appears in the game Fighters Megamix, a crossover title with Sega AM2's Virtua Fighter franchise, where she has a rivalry with the character Pai Chan. Despite having voiced lines in each game, no voice actor has been credited for the character.

Outside of video games, Honey has also been featured in several print publications including Fighting Vipers 4 Koma Gag Battle, an anthology gag comic book, and Fighting Vipers: Crimson Angel, a Japanese novel based on the first game. She was also prominently featured in a fan book for the game, Fighting Vipers: My Sweet Honey, written by Famitsu magazine's editorial staff and featuring mock interviews with the character as well as a cosplay guide.

=== Gameplay ===
Her fighting style is described as "Cat Punch", utilizing light punches and heavy kicks, throwing herself butt-first at opponents, and various grab attacks. Her gameplay was intended to appeal to casual fighting game fans, utilizing fast attacks with a low skill ceiling. Notable attacks include Cat Uppercut, a rising uppercut motion, and Go To Heaven, where she will tackle the opponent with her legs around their head to knock them down. Meanwhile, other moves such as Fork Through and Bilt Horse are used for less offensive purposes and more for positioning, going below and above accordingly to get behind the opponent for an opportunity to further attack.

When asked about her gameplay, Sugiyama stated much of it was for fun and due to a slightly perverted mindset, which he joked Kataoka shared. He ultimately wanted Fighting Vipers to be more lighthearted than Virtua Fighter, as well as a game that could appeal to boys. In addition several of the moves he incorporated were created with the intention of giving players opportunities for flashy finishers against opponents to heighten the game's appeal.

=== Honey the Cat ===
Honey, as she appears in Sonic the Fighters. Her appearance was slightly changed for her comic debut.

An anthropomorphic cat version of Honey appears in the fighting game Sonic the Fighters, which was also developed by Sega AM2 and featured characters from Sega's Sonic the Hedgehog franchise. Dubbed "Honey the Cat", she was not playable through normal means and only discovered due to hackers exploring the game's code. In an interview, Kataoka stated he believed Sugiyama had snuck her into the title during development. This iteration of Honey resembles a short, orange bipedal cat, wearing her attire from Fighting Vipers and in the same artstyle as the other Sonic franchise characters.

When Sega ported several of their AM2 arcade games to Xbox 360 and PlayStation 3 in 2012, one of the programmers rediscovered the character in the game's code. This surprised the producer on the project, Tohru Murayama, who discovered the character had received a large amount of fan art in Western markets. After collaborating with programmer Daichi Katagiri, who had overseen development of the original game, they decided to re-implement Honey as a secret character for the ports. This version of Honey was given a backstory similar to the original, being a fashion designer that enters fighting tournaments to showcase her work. Since then, she has also appeared in Sonic the Hedgehog comic books published by Archie Comics and IDW Publishing. These iterations of the character were mostly unchanged, save for her fur color being changed to yellow with a black patch at the lower end of her tail.

== Promotion and reception ==
Promotional material for Honey often relied on imagery of her in her underwear, which positively impacted her reception as a character and that of Fighting Vipers as a whole, but also drew criticism due to the character's young age. Such depictions also hurt home ports of the title, with some retailers refusing to stock it in response.

To highlight the game's release, Sega used images of the character's unarmored chest to illustrate a before and after of their new shading technology for the title that smoothed the game's 3D polygons. She was further featured in magazine advertisements that focused on her sex appeal, while a pin-up featuring her reclining in her underwear was printed in Sega Saturn Magazine. Character customization items based on Honey were also included in the 2002 Sega-produced volleyball game Beach Spikers. Honey was also featured on several physical pieces of merchandise, such as keychain toys and sculpted figures, some of which were given as prizes for sponsored Fighting Vipers tournaments, and a statue figure released by Yujin in 2005. Sega meanwhile ran a promotion with British tabloid the Daily Star utilizing pin-up models to represent female Sega video game characters, among them Honey.

Since her debut, Honey was the most popular of Fighting Vipers's cast and a popular character in video gaming overall, seeing a dramatically higher usage rate at location tests for the game than any other character. Japanese mook 2D Idol Encyclopedia cited her as an example of one of gaming's upcoming "virtual idols", comparing her to Capcom characters Sakura Kasugano and Jill Valentine in terms of how each character rapidly rose in popularity. Another Japanese magazine, Game Charge, felt a lot of her appeal arouse from being a simple to use character with flashy techniques. They further described Honey as having a "lolita-loli" aspect, comparing her to Jun Kazama from Tekken 2 and added that her well-proportioned face coupled gave her character a "mysterious attraction".

The staff of Chinese magazine Diànzǐ Yóuxì Ruǎnjiàn in their supplemental 1997 issue described her as the standout character of Fighting Vipers, considering her most striking features to be her "adorable face, delicate voice, [and] unique appearance". Additional praise went to her movements, comparing them to a cat and calling them unconventional, but also added that her "prickly kitten-like demeanor" contrasted well against her actual personality of a shy and introverted girl only partaking in the tournament to showcase her fashion design skills.

Western media outlets have also commented on her, with Play magazine stating she remains "one of Sega's most beloved and recognizable characters" long after the game itself was forgotten. IGN writer Stefano Castelli attributed some of this to her acrobatic moveset, but also felt that of Fight Vipers' cast she was the only character with a decent original design. Sega Saturn Magazine meanwhile described her as having "the most crazy whacked-out designed backstory for any videogame character ever", calling her fighting style simple but effective and praising some of the fanservice provided by them visually. Meanwhile, Playboy cited Honey alongside other examples of how gaming was steadily introducing strong women in media, emphasizing the work put into the characters as well as their sex appeal.

Honey has also been cited as a frequent subject of fan works, particularly cosplay, with a store in Japan selling replicas of her costume alongside those of other characters. SNK artist Falcoon commented on the subject on social media website Twitter, considering her concept a success and stating he recalled seeing as many cosplays of Honey as those of fellow female fighting game characters Mai Shiranui and Chun-Li. Game Charge noted they received a significant amount of fan art of Honey after the release of Fighting Vipers, which they attributed to both how easy she was to draw and her popularity amongst fans of cosplayers, and observed a high presence of the character at cosplay competitions in 1996.

Toshimichi Kakizaki of Japanese magazine CG-iCupid also praised her as one of gaming's "virtual idols", though not without caveats. Noting the unorthodox nature of her fighting style, he felt she lacked aspects essential on the surface to make her a good fighting game character. This was furthered by her outfit, particularly due to her back accessories such as her wings, which made players feel embarrassed to use her. However, he observed these attitudes changed once players noticed a mechanic in Fighting Vipers allowed them to remove their own armor. As this left her body more exposed, word of mouth quickly spread regarding the character and players began to habitually choose her to see it firsthand, despite the fact removing her armor imposed a gameplay disadvantage in the form of receiving increased damage. Game Charge meanwhile featured a five page article discussing this fanservice aspect, expressing surprise at seeing this displayed in an arcade environment and further calling it "something you'll never forget."

The sexualization of the character has received some criticism, however. The pin-up material emphasizing her breasts coupled with her age of 16 in the original Fighting Vipers caused some North American retailers to refuse to stock the game, resulting in Sega censoring the character for that region. Retro Gamer however, in a retrospective on the game's localization issues, pointed out advertisements used the slogan "Storm in a D-Cup" in regards to Honey and questioned Sega's commitment to such removing "unnecessary sexualization". University College London Professors Pam Gilbert and Nola Alloway for the book Wired-Up: Young People and the Electronic Media meanwhile cited her as an example of how fighting games use "heterosexist politics that underpins the inclusion of the women" and ensured a "subordinated status in relation to the male warriors", particularly due to game's emphasis on her fashion career but also her portrayal of fighting in a red dress and stilettos against stronger opponents, something they felt "any athletic woman would find a daunting task".
