= Imai Toonz =

Japanese artist

Imaitoonz (aka Imai Toonz) is a Japanese artist. His work spans the world of comics/manga, film/animation, advertising/product design, and fine art. He did the drawn artwork for Fighting Vipers 2 and the planning, screenplay, and character designs for the animated film Dead Leaves, in collaboration with Production I.G. In 2005, he collaborated once more with Production I.G. and Dead Leaves' director, Hiroyuki Imaishi, to produce OVALxOVER, a short film to promote the Indy Racing League 3000.
