= Dynamite Düx =

1988 Video game

- Japanese arcade flyer
- Developer: Sega R&D8
- Publisher: Sega
- Director: Satoshi Mifune
- Producer: Yu Suzuki
- Programmers: Satoshi Mifune; Tomoharu Kimura
- Artist: Kiyoshi Hamada
- Composer: Hiroshi Kawaguchi
- Platforms: Arcade, Amiga, Amstrad CPC, Commodore 64, ZX Spectrum, Atari ST, Master System
- Release: September 1988: Arcade; EU: September 1988; JP: December 1988 Amiga, C64, CPC, ZX Spectrum; EU: September 1989 Atari ST; EU: 1989 Master System; PAL: January 1990
- Genre: Beat 'em up
- Modes: Single-player, multiplayer
- Arcade system: Sega System 16

Dynamite Düx is a 1988 beat 'em up video game developed and published by Sega for arcades. Produced by Yu Suzuki and with music composed by Hiroshi Kawaguchi, the game uses the Sega System 16 arcade board, the same board used for Golden Axe and Altered Beast. The game follows ducks Bin and Pin in their quest to rescue a girl named Lucy from the evil sorcerer Achacha. The game was ported to the Master System, Amiga, Amstrad CPC, Atari ST, Commodore 64, and ZX Spectrum; a Mega Drive version was planned but never released.

The game received positive reviews from critics, with Sinclair User magazine awarding it the Most Original Game of the Year for 1988.

== Gameplay ==
The player controls one of two bow tie-wearing cartoon ducks named Bin (blue) and Pin (red). They are Lucy's pets, and must travel through six stages set in real locations, though everything else in the game is very cartoonish, reminiscent of Tex Avery. Two players can play at once: Bin is by default player one's character, Pin player two's. Each level ends with a boss battle. After stages 2 and 4 there is a bonus round where the two ducks box until time runs out; the player with the most health will win and receive 50,000 points.

Dynamite Düx uses only two buttons: the jump button (which is self-explanatory) and the attack button. The attack button allows the player(s) to use the Punch Glove or throw enemies in a manner like a cartoon. The attack button can also let him/her pick up and use numerous weapons including rocks, bazookas and the game's signature weapon, bombs. Unlike some of its contemporary side-scrollers, Dynamite Düx allows players to attack in all directions, including diagonally.

The game measures health unusually in that it uses a status bar located at the bottom of the screen. A player's status is made up of bars of health that are color-coded blue, yellow and red, which deplete when damage is taken. Along with a varied set of enemies (all oddball cartoonlike characters) each level has a number of other obstacles that can inflict damage on the player(s).

There are three types of power-ups: Food (replenishes health), weapons (all weapons will eventually 'expire' when their ammo depletes) and treasure chests (give the player(s) extra points or weapons).

== Ports ==
The game was released for the Master System in 1990. The sprites are smaller and different, with many of the characters having noticeably fewer frames of animation. Many of the enemies' unique dying animations were cut or altered. There are fewer weapons and power-ups per level as well as fewer enemies per level. The story has also been altered. Instead of being her pet, Bin (Pin does not appear) is Mickael, Lucy's boyfriend. Mickael has been transformed into Bin the duck by Achacha (similar to Toki). The two-players mode is removed from this version.

The Amiga and Atari ST versions include an alternate, intentionally offensive version of the opening cutscene. It is not in the game proper, but can only be accessed by editing game data with a hex editor.

== Reception ==
In Japan, Game Machine listed Dynamite Düx as the third most successful table arcade unit of February 1989.

The arcade game received positive reviews from critics. Upon release, Clare Edgeley gave it a positive review in Computer and Video Games magazine. She called it "the most amusing game I've seen in a long while" with praise for the "delightful" graphics, "fantastic scenario" and the "variety of baddies" providing "an endless source of inspiration for anyone wanting to get into cartoon graphics." She found it refreshingly different from the violent action games popular in arcades at the time, and concluded it "might not be macho, but it's a laugh." Sinclair User reviewed the arcade game and gave it a rating of 9 out of 10, describing it as an entertaining pseudo-3D scroller with "a surreal sense of the ridiculous." Sinclair User later gave it the 1988 award for "Most Original Game of the Year", calling it "a cutsie [sic], surreal job that'll be tickling your ribs well into '89."

The Master System port received a positive review from Julian Rignall in Computer and Video Games. He gave it an overall score of 90%, with sub-ratings of 90% for graphics, 78% for sound, 86% for value, and 91% for playability. He said he "loved Dynamite Dux in the arcades, and this Sega version is the spitting image, combining superb, colourful graphics and highly addictive gameplay to give one of the best Sega games around." However, he criticized it for lacking the two-player co-op mode of the arcade original.

In a retrospective overview of the arcade game, Kurt Kalata of Hardcore Gaming 101 noted that, in contrast to the "dark and gritty rampages of violence" in other beat 'em ups (such as Double Dragon, Final Fight, Golden Axe and Streets of Rage), Dynamite Dux instead had a more light-hearted, "sillier" direction, stating "Dynamite Dux is to Double Dragon as TwinBee is to Xevious." He called it "an impossibly colorful and silly game" and said "it's an attractive game with catchy music and a generally goofy atmosphere, so it's worth a play through."

== Legacy ==
The character Bean the Dynamite introduced in Sonic the Fighters (1996), a Sonic the Hedgehog fighting game by Sega AM2, is based on the characters Bin and Pin from Dynamite Düx. Bean also appears in AM2's Sega Saturn fighting game Fighters Megamix, and as a minor character in the Sonic comic series published by Archie Comics and the succeeding series by IDW.
