= Space Patrol Luluco =

Anime TV series created by Hiroyuki Imaishi and produced by Trigger

- Key visual

宇宙パトロールルル子 (Uchū Patorōru Ruruko)
- Genre: Action; Sci-fi comedy; Surreal comedy
- Created by: Studio Trigger; Hiroyuki Imaishi
- Anime television series
- Directed by: Hiroyuki Imaishi
- Produced by: Yoshiki Usa
- Written by: Hiroyuki Imaishi
- Music by: Kenichiro Suehiro
- Studio: Studio Trigger
- Licensed by: Crunchyroll
- Original network: AT-X, Tokyo MX, BS11
- Original run: April 1, 2016 – June 24, 2016
- Episodes: 13
- Manga
- Written by: Studio Trigger; Hiroyuki Imaishi
- Illustrated by: Nanboku
- Published by: Shueisha
- Magazine: Ultra Jump
- Original run: April 19, 2016 – June 18, 2016
- icon

Space Patrol Luluco (Japanese: 宇宙パトロールルル子, Hepburn: Uchū Patorōru Ruruko) is a Japanese anime television series created by Hiroyuki Imaishi and produced by Studio Trigger. It aired from April to June 2016 as part of the Ultra Super Anime Time programming block.

== Plot ==
Luluco is a normal girl living in the Solar System frontier space colonization zone Ogikubo. Her father works for the zone's Space Patrol division. Despite being a part of this wondrous district full of alien immigrants, Luluco often lives an ordinary life as a student. When her father is accidentally frozen by alien contraband, Luluco is forced to request help from her father's Space Patrol division. She is appointed a member of the Space Patrol by the division chief, Over Justice, in order to pay the fees required to revive her father. From then on, Luluco's previously normal life faces drastic changes as she is sent on daily missions to protect Ogikubo from space criminals. On these missions she bands together with her assigned partner and alien exchange student ΑΩ (pronounced "Alpha Omega") Nova, as well as their fairly normal mutual classmate Midori.

== Characters ==
Luluco (ルル子, Ruruko)
Voiced by: M·A·O (Japanese); Brittney Karbowski (English)
A second-year junior high school student living with her father in Ogikubo. Innocent, wistful, and nervous, her one true wish is to lead a normal life despite her unusual living situation. She has the ability to transform into a gun via "Judgement Gun Morphing."
Alpha Omega Nova (ΑΩ・ノヴァ, Arufa Omega Nova)
Voiced by: Junya Enoki (Japanese); Justin Briner (English)
A Space Patrol officer and Luluco's partner. He is a recent transfer student at Space Middle School and her classmate. Luluco gains feelings for him and tries her best to get him to notice them.
Midori Save-The-World (ミドリ)
Voiced by: Mayumi Shintani (Japanese); Jamie Marchi (English)
A fellow classmate at Luluco's school. After being caught as the publisher and distributor of a quasi-legal Blackhole App, she volunteers to join the Space Patrol in order to get out of any punishments for her crimes, as well as to spend more time at the side of ΑΩ Nova.
General Manager Over Justice (オーバージャスティス本部長, Ōbā Jasutisu Honbuchō)
Voiced by: Tetsu Inada (Japanese); Bob Carter (English)
A flaming skeleton who is the head of the Space Patrol's Ogikubo Branch and Luluco's boss. He is completely static and only stands up from his desk when the situation calls for it.
Secretary (秘書, Hisho)
A temporary staff worker at the Space Patrol. She serves as Over Justice's personal secretary. Unlike the rest of the cast, she is mute and rarely expresses any form of emotion.
Keiji (ケイジ)
Voiced by: Mitsuo Iwata (Japanese); Brett Weaver (English)
A Space Patrol officer and Luluco's father who becomes frozen after eating a strange pill.
Lalaco Godspeed (ララ子・ゴッドスピード, Rarako Goddosupīdo)
Voiced by: Yōko Honna (Japanese); Monica Rial (English)
Luluco's mother and a space pirate. She seeks to take Ogikubo and sell to the highest bidder. Just like the members of the Space Patrol, she has a gun morphing ability, called "God Pirate's Gun Morphing".
Space Patrol Galaxy Commander-in-Chief/Blackholeian (ブラックホール星人)
Voiced by: Nobuyuki Hiyama (Japanese); Christopher Bevins (English)
An evil alien masquerading as the leader of the Space Patrol. He manipulates the cast from behind the scenes in order to get what he wants, as his species is prone to shoplifting and other forms of petty crime.

== Media ==
=== Anime ===
The series is written and directed by Hiroyuki Imaishi with character design by Mago and Yusuke Yoshigaki. The opening theme is "CRYmax Dohejitsu" (CRYまっくすド平日, Kuraimakkusu Dohejitsu; lit. 'CRYmax Ultra Ordinary Days') by Fujirokku, while the ending theme is "Pipo Password" by TeddyLoid feat. Bonjour Suzuki. The series features cameo appearances from other Trigger animations, including Kill la Kill, Little Witch Academia, Inferno Cop, Kiznaiver, and Sex and Violence with Machspeed. Crunchyroll has licensed the series in North America and simulcasted the show in Japanese with English subtitles, while Funimation would later produce a dub on October 10, 2017. However, due to the split between both Crunchyroll and Funimation, the English dub was removed and put on Crunchyroll, as well as being taken off of digital purchasing sites. The average run time is 8 minutes for all episodes.

No.	Title	Directed by	Written by	Original release date
1	"I'm a Normal Middle School Student"; Transliteration: "Watashi, Futsū no Chūgakusei" (Japanese: 私、普通の中学生)	Hiroyuki Ōshima	Hiroyuki Imaishi	April 1, 2016
Luluco and her father, Keiji live in Ogikubo; a solar system district where aliens and Earthlings coexist. When Keiji inadvertently eats a pill and gets trapped in ablock of ice, Luluco takes him to the police station, only to be forced to take his place as a member of the Space Patrol.
2	"A New Transfer Student Arrives!"; Transliteration: "Tenkōsei ga Kita!" (Japanese: 転校生が来た！)	Hiroyuki Ōshima	Akira Amemiya	April 8, 2016
Things get stranger for Luluco, as the arrival of a new transfer student and partner named Alpha Omega Nova shakes things up even further.
3	"Battlefield Classroom"; Transliteration: "Senjō Kyōshitsu" (Japanese: 戦場教室)	Hiroaki Akagi	Akira Amemiya	April 15, 2016
Luluco and Nova discover their classmate, Midori, to be the creator of the illegal Blackhole App. After her plans are foiled, Midori ends up joining the Space Patrol, much to Luluco's dismay.
4	"Into the Sky All Alone"; Transliteration: "Hitoribocchi no Sora e" (Japanese: ひとりぼっちの空へ)	Hiroyuki Ōshima	Hiromi Wakabayashi	April 22, 2016
A meteorite comes hurtling towards Ogikubo, and only the Space Patrol trio can prevent Armageddon.
5	"What Should I Do?"; Transliteration: "Dōshitara Ii no" (Japanese: どうしたらいいの)	Tomoyuki Munehiro	Hiromi Wakabayashi	April 29, 2016
Luluco's mother, the legendary space pirate Lalaco Godspeed, unveils her grand plan and it involves Ogikubo.
6	"That One Part Awakens"; Transliteration: "Mezameta sono Bubun" (Japanese: 目覚めたその部分)	Toshiyuki Sone	Hiromi Wakabayashi	May 6, 2016
Luluco and the others attempt to stop Lalaco from selling off Ogikubo to the highest bidder on an auction site.
7	"The Trap of Fate's Threads"; Transliteration: "Unmei no Ito no Wana" (Japanese: 運命の糸の罠)	Hiroyuki Ōshima	Hiroshi Satō	May 13, 2016
While finding Ogikubo, Luluco and company find themselves on a planet covered in thread, coming against an adversary who resembles Nova.
8	"The Trap of the Mystical Power"; Transliteration: "Fushigi na Chikara no Wana" (Japanese: 不思議な力の罠)	Junichi Kitamura	Kimiko Ueno	May 20, 2016
Luluco and Nova visit a witch academy planet, where a witch named Sucy gives Luluco some poisonous mushrooms that will allegedly kill her in six minutes.
9	"The True Trap"; Transliteration: "Hontō no Wana" (Japanese: 本当の罠)	Atsushi Nigorikawa	Hiroyuki Imaishi	May 27, 2016
Luluco visits the detective team of Sex, Violence, and MachSpeed for dating advice on Badger Planet SVM-2, but ends up landing in the crossfire between the Badger Game Detective Agency and the T-Bone Syndicate.
10	"It's All Over"; Transliteration: "Zenbu Owari" (Japanese: 全部おわり)	Tomoyuki Munehiro	Kimiko Ueno	June 3, 2016
Nova is revealed to be a Nothingling working under an evil Blackholeian, who breaks Luluco's fragile heart and kills her.
11	"I Was Clueless"; Transliteration: "Watashi, Wakattenakatta" (Japanese: 私、わかってなかった)	Akira Amemiya	Akira Amemiya	June 10, 2016
Finding herself in Hell, Luluco meets former Space Patrol officer Inferno Cop, who helps her realize her first love isn't over yet and come back to life.
12	"Confession"; Transliteration: "Kokuhaku" (Japanese: 告白)	Hiroyuki Ōshima	Hiromi Wakabayashi	June 17, 2016
With help from her family and friends, Luluco sets forth to confront Nova and confess her feelings for him.
13	"I'll Give Chase to the Ends of the Universe"; Transliteration: "Watashi, Uchū no……" (Japanese: 私、宇宙の……)	Hiroyuki Imaishi	Hiroyuki Imaishi	June 24, 2016
With their feelings mutual, Luluco and Nova fight together to defeat the Blackholeian.

=== Manga ===
A manga adaptation illustrated by Nanboku began serialization in Shueisha's Ultra Jump magazine in April and June 2016 and was released in English by Crunchyroll.
