= Honey (given name) =

- Gender: Unisex, primarily feminine
- Language: English

Origin
- Meaning: Honey

Honey is an English hypocorism, independent given name, and surname meaning “honey”, which has long been used to sweeten foods and is a common English term of endearment. The word is derived from the Old English term hungi.

== Women ==
- Honey Benjamin, Indian politician
- Honey Bruce (1927–2005), American stripper and showgirl
- Honey Lee Cottrell (1946–2015), American photographer and filmmaker
- Honey Irani, (born 1950) Indian actress and screenwriter
- Honey Lacuna (born 1965), Filipina physician and politician
- Honey Lantree (1943–2018), English drummer and singer, best known as a member of the 1960s pop group The Honeycombs
- Honey Lauren, American actress, screenwriter and film director
- Honey Mahogany (born 1983), American drag performer
- Honey Nway Oo (born 1999), Burmese actress and activist
- Honey Piazza (born 1951), American piano player
- Honey Rose (born 1991), Indian actress
- Honey Watson (born 1994), English author and translator of literature from Mandarin to English

== Men ==
- Honey Bafna (born 1987), Indian actor
- Honey Chhaya (1930–2016), Indian writer, actor and director
- Honey Craven (1904–2003), American equestrian, ringmaster and horse show manager

== Fictional characters ==
- Honey Best, is Lucius Best, also known as Frozone's wife, a character in the 2004 Disney/Pixar animated film The Incredibles voiced by Kimberly Adair Clark
- Honey Lemon, a superhero appearing in American comic books published by Marvel Comics
- Honey Mitchell, a fictional character from the BBC soap opera EastEnders
- Honey O'Donahue, a character in the 2025 American neo-noir dark comedy detective film Honey Don't!
- Honey Ryder, a fictional character in Ian Fleming's James Bond novel Dr. No and the 1962 Bond film of the same title
- Honey West, a fictional private detective from novels by Gloria and Forest Fickling and the titular character in the 1960s American television action drama Honey West
- Honey Wright, a fictional character from the BBC medical drama Casualty

== Stage name ==
- Honey Bane, English singer and actress
- Honey Cocaine, Cambodian-Canadian rapper
- Honey Davenport, American drag performer, singer, songwriter, actor and activist
- Honey Dijon, American DJ, producer, and electronic musician
- Honey G (rapper), English rapper
- Honey Mahogany, American activist, politician, drag performer, and singer
- Yo Yo Honey Singh, Indian rapper
