= Honey (disambiguation) =

Honey is a sweet, edible fluid produced by bees.

Honey or Honeys may also refer to:

== Places ==
=== United States ===
- Honey Lake, California
- Honey Branch, a tributary of the Stony Brook in New Jersey
- Honey Creek (Pennsylvania)
- Honey Hill, South Carolina, site of the American Civil War Battle of Honey Hill
- Honey Creek (Texas), a number of streams (and other entities)

=== Elsewhere ===
- Honey, Puebla, a town and municipality in the Mexican state of Puebla
- Mount Honey, Campbell Island, New Zealand

== People ==
- Honey (given name)
- Honey (surname)

== Arts, entertainment, and media ==
=== Characters ===
- Honey (Fighting Vipers), a playable character in the video game Fighting Vipers
- Honey, the girlfriend of the Warner Bros. cartoon character Bosko
- Honey, from the animated television series Camp Lazlo
- Mitsukuni Haninozuka, nicknamed Honey from the manga and anime series Ouran High School Host Club
- Honey, in the anime series Space Dandy
- Honey, from Bluey
- Honey Bunny, associated with Bugs Bunny
- Honey Buttowski, from Kick Buttowski: Suburban Daredevil
- Honey Huan, in the comic strip Doonesbury
- Honey Kisaragi, the title character of the anime and manga Cutie Honey
- Honey Lemon, from Big Hero 6
- Honey Mitchell, in the soap opera EastEnders
- Honey Ryder, in the James Bond film Dr. No
- Honey West, in novels and a television series
- Honey the Cat, from the Sonic the Hedgehog franchise
- Honey Wilkes, the sister of Ashley Wilkes in the novel Gone with the Wind and film

=== Films ===
- Honey (1930 film), an American comedy
- Honey (1981 film), an Italian sex comedy starring Clio Goldsmith
- Honey (2003 film), an American dance film starring Jessica Alba
- Honey (2010 film), a Turkish drama directed by Semih Kaplanoğlu
- Honey (2026 film), an Indian psychological horror thriller

=== Music ===
==== Groups ====
- Honey (band), a late 1990s and early 2000s Christian ambient rock and alt/pop rock band
- The Honeys, an American surf rock girl group formed in 1963

==== Albums ====
- Honey (Andy Williams album), 1968
- Honey (Bobby Goldsboro album), 1968
- Honey (Caribou album), 2024)
- Honey (Chara album), 2008
- Honey (Jimmy McGriff album), 1968
- Honey (Kara album), 2009
- Honey (Katy B album), 2016
- Honey (Ohio Players album), 1975
- Honey (Open Hand album), 2010
- Honey (Robert Palmer album), 1994
- Honey (Robyn album), 2018
- Honey (Scandal album), 2018
- Honey (Sonny James album), 1958
- Honey: Music from & Inspired by the Motion Picture, the soundtrack to the 2003 film Honey
- Honey (Brother Sundance EP), 2017
- Honey (Lay EP), 2019
- Honeys (album), by Pissed Jeans, 2013

==== Songs ====
- "Honey" (Erykah Badu song), 2007
- "Honey" (Mariah Carey song), 1997
- "Honey" (Bobby Goldsboro song), 1968
- "Honey" (Jay-Z and R. Kelly song), 2002
- "Honey" (Kehlani song), 2017
- "Honey" (L'Arc-en-Ciel song), 1998
- "Honey" (Moby song), 1998
- "Honey" (Robyn song), 2018
- "Honey" (Rudy Vallée song), 1945
- "Honey" (Troye Sivan song), 2023
- "Honey" (Taylor Swift song), 2025
- "Honey (Open That Door)", by Ricky Skaggs, 1984
- "Honey", by America, from Your Move
- "Honey", by Aretha Franklin, from Greatest Hits: 1980–1994
- "Honey", by Big Time Rush
- "Honey", by Bonnie McKee, from Trouble
- "Honey", by Girls' Generation, from Girls' Generation
- "Honey", by Halsey, from If I Can't Have Love, I Want Power
- "Honey", by The Hush Sound from Goodbye Blues
- "Honey", by Kara, from the Pretty Girl Special Edition EP
- "Honey", by Kesha, from High Road
- "Honey", by King Gizzard & the Lizard Wizard, from K.G.
- "Honey", by Lovers Electric, from Whatever You Want
- "Honey", by Maggie Rogers, from Surrender
- "Honey", by Spacemen 3, from Playing with Fire
- "Honey", by the band System of a Down
- "Pure/Honey", by Beyoncé, from Renaissance

=== Other uses in arts, entertainment, and media ===
- Honey (magazine), a British women's magazine published 1960–1986
- Honey, an American women's magazine founded by Harris Publications in 1999
- Honey So Sweet (Japanese title "Honey"), a 2012 manga series by Amu Meguro
- Honey (TV channel), African lifestyle channel
- The Honeys (play), by Roald Dahl
- "Honey" (Fear the Walking Dead), an episode of the television series Fear the Walking Dead
- "Honey Honey", an episode of the second season of the animated television series Plonsters
- Honey (TV series), an upcoming British television series

== Other uses ==
- PayPal Honey, a browser extension
- Honey, a term of endearment
- M3 Stuart light tank, an American World War II tank (British nickname "Honey")

== See also ==
- Honey Honey, the main character of the anime and manga Honey Honey no Suteki na Bouken
- "Honey, Honey", a 1974 song by ABBA
- Alana "Honey Boo Boo" Thompson, child reality show star on the show Here Comes Honey Boo Boo
- HNNY, pronounced "honey", a Swedish house music producer and DJ
- Honeyz, a British-based R&B girl group formed in 1997
- Honi (disambiguation)
