= Inferno Cop =

Original net animation

- Key visual

インフェルノコップ (Inferuno Koppu)
- Original net animation
- Directed by: Akira Amemiya; Hiroyuki Imaishi
- Written by: Hiromi Wakabayashi
- Studio: Trigger/CoMix Wave
- Released: December 24, 2012 – March 18, 2013
- Runtime: 3 minutes
- Episodes: 13

Inferno Cop (インフェルノコップ, Infaruno Koppu) is a 13-episode Japanese original net animation in the motion comic style, directed by Akira Amemiya with Hiroyuki Imaishi serving as series production director and produced by Trigger and CoMix Wave. It was streamed via the Anime Bancho YouTube channel from December 24, 2012 to March 18, 2013. The main theme is "Die Höllen Polizei" (ディ ホゥーレン ポリツァイ, Di Hūren Poritsai; lit. "Hell Police") by Juriano Hagiwara. A second season has been announced. However this has been complicated by the passing of Inferno Cop's voice actor Junichi Goto in February 2020.

== Synopsis ==
The series centers around the adventures of Inferno Cop, a police officer with a flaming head who seeks revenge after his family was murdered by Southern Cross, a shady, Illuminati-like organization that attempts to control the world with its various monsters and thugs. Inferno Cop dispenses ruthless justice on all lawbreakers he can find in Jack Knife Edge Town, generally by blowing them up, shooting them dead or both. Inferno Cop rapidly goes from one ridiculous incident to another, including fighting a newborn baby, travelling through time, fending off a zombie apocalypse, turning into a car for several episodes, and killing a mummy and becoming the new pharaoh after mishearing his sidekick's dying words. He ultimately tries to halt Southern Cross' attempts to bring about an end of the world with Inferno Cop as the key.

== Recurring characters ==
Inferno Cop
A brash and violent former police officer turned vigilante. He drives a flaming cop car and his head is a flaming skull that wears sunglasses. He uses a revolver that blows up nearly anything it shoots. His family was murdered by Southern Cross, and it is implied that they killed him as well before the series. While most of the local police in Jack Knife Edge City excuse any crime so long as the perpetrators have "paid their taxes," Inferno Cop will tolerate no evil and destroy any lawbreaker on sight with little to no evidence. He is a middle school dropout and is severely weakened when underwater, though his skull/head stays on fire regardless.

Mr. Judge
A masked vigilante and purveyor of justice, both as a superhero and an actual judge.

Mecha Cop
A hulking robot armed with chain guns that are created by Southern Cross solely to kill Inferno Cop. When he proves incapable of doing so, they are forced to work together when they are both sent into the past, and eventually Hell itself. When Inferno Cop notices the exit to Hell, Mecha Cop chooses to stay in Hell and help others instead.

Auntie Grenda
Inferno Cop's aunt who lives in Hell. She is a kindly old lady despite her situation. Mecha Cop befriends her when he and Inferno Cop arrive in Hell, and she is later seen riding him into battle.

Claudia
A blonde woman saved by Inferno Cop, only to come back later, revealed to be a very powerful entity, with a passionate love for Inferno Cop.

FBI
A trio of hitmen who work for the Southern Cross. One of them is short, one is tall, and one of them is fat. They attempt to kill Inferno Cop while he is in the hospital. The only thing they ever say is "FBI!".

Hellfire Boy
A young boy that Inferno Cop accidentally sets on fire after coming back from Hell. He becomes Inferno Cop's sidekick, and later sacrifices himself as fuel to help Inferno Cop win a race against Mr. Judge. He eventually returns as a malt loaf and is consumed by Inferno Cop twice (once in Egypt, and again before the final battle).

High Priest Altair, Deneb, and Vega
The masterminds of the Southern Cross. All three of them are cloaked in robes, and their faces look nearly inhumane.

Ariel Suzuki
A reporter who works for Channel 11. She does the weather and zombie reports, and also does a report when aliens invade and kidnap Inferno Cop. She is also the mother of Hellfire Boy.

== Episode list ==
No.	Title	Original release date
1	"The Badge From Hell"; Transliteration: "Jigoku no Keiji wa Yattekuru" (Japanese: 地獄の刑事はやってくる)	December 24, 2012
In Jack Knife Edge Town, a gang attempts to attack a pregnant woman when a police officer shows up. He prepares to arrest them for wrongdoing, but they point out they pay their taxes and convince him to leave. Moments later, a vigilante named Inferno Cop arrives and easily wipes out the gang, but the woman experiences amniorrhexis, spraying him with water.
2	"Deep Blue Baby"; Transliteration: "Dīpu Burū Beibī" (Japanese: ディープブルーベイビー)	December 31, 2012
The woman's amniorrhexis causes a flash flood. While trying to stay afloat, Inferno Cop finds a baby in the water; the baby has a scar shaped like the Southern Cross emblem, an organization that killed Inferno Cop's family. The baby reveals himself to indeed be a Southern Cross member and drags him underwater, where the baby shape-shifts into a larger monster. Although Inferno Cop's bullet deflects off the baby, it also deflects off Inferno Cop and kills the baby. However, another vigilante in Mr. Judge witnesses the fight and arrests Inferno Cop for infanticide and mutilation.
3	"Proof of Justice"; Transliteration: "Seigi no Shōsa" (Japanese: 正義の証左)	January 7, 2013
Inferno Cop's trial reaches the Supreme Court, where he and Mr. Judge repeatedly object to the other's claims. Unable to keep up, the chief judge repeatedly flips sides before giving both of them the death penalty. Annoyed, Inferno Cop kills the judge, but Mr. Judge reveals himself to be the true chief justice and sentences him to prison. During the ride to jail, the police van drives off a cliff.
4	"Escape From Nightmare"; Transliteration: "Akumu kara no Dasshutsu" (Japanese: 悪夢からの脱出)	January 14, 2013
Southern Cross outlines their plans for Inferno Cop, including treating him at an organization-run hospital and turning him into their soldier, which would bury him in a massive debt that drives him to suicide; to ensure their plan works, Southern Cross hires a trio of hitmen called FBI to oversee him. Inferno Cop awakes as a doctor attempts to operate on him, so he escapes. FBI takes a nurse as hostage in an effort to stop him, but Inferno Cop simply kills them before leaping through a hospital window and landing in a zombie-infested street.
5	"The Apocalyptic World"; Transliteration: "Yagate Owaru Sekai" (Japanese: やがて終わる世界)	January 21, 2013
Surrounded by zombies, Inferno Cop spots a newspaper that reveals he had been unconscious for over 80 years. Before he is overrun, a robot created by Southern Cross called Mecha Cop kills the zombies before turning on him. Mecha Cop shoots him with his minigun, but Inferno Cop survives and retaliates by transforming into a car and ramming him. Inferno Cop's speed increases as he tries to go back in time, but overshoots and the two land in the prehistoric era.
6	"From the Ancient Village"; Transliteration: "Taiko no Mura Yori" (Japanese: 太古の村より)	January 28, 2013
Inferno and Mecha Cop inadvertently land in the Cretaceous period, where they are attacked by dinosaurs. The two spot a tribe of small creatures and approach them, but fall into a trap and are placed on a roast. However, one tribesman reads an ancient manuscript and assume the pair are gods, sparing them. As they feast, the real god intervenes.
7	"A Picture of the Inferno"; Transliteration: "Inferuno Jigoku-hen" (Japanese: インフェルノ地獄変)	February 4, 2013
As punishment, the god sends the two to Hell, where Inferno Cop reunites with his Auntie Grenda. Grenda asks the two to find her husband; once they succeed, Grenda points them to an exit door to leave. While Inferno Cop leaves, Mecha Cop chooses to stay upon realizing his ability to help others in Hell. Back on the mortal plane, Inferno Cop accidentally sets a bullied boy on fire, who reveals himself as Hellfire Boy.
8	"Accelerating Spirit"; Transliteration: "Tamashī wa Kasokusuru" (Japanese: 魂は加速する)	February 11, 2013
Hellfire Boy invites Inferno Cop to take over the world; although skeptical, Inferno Cop accepts when he notices a poster for the America Racing Grand Prix with enough prize money to achieve their goal. Much of the race's field consists of figures from previous episodes including Mr. Judge and the baby, the latter of whom is eliminated from the race after briefly leading. With Inferno Cop struggling to catch up to Mr. Judge, Hellfire Boy sacrifices himself to power him. Although Inferno Cop closes in, Mr. Judge unceremoniously wins by an easy margin. Nevertheless, Inferno Cop also receives the prize money.
9	"Rest in Peace, My Friend"; Transliteration: "Shōnen'yo, Yasuraka ni Nemure" (Japanese: 少年よ、安らかに眠れ)	February 18, 2013
Inferno Cop mourns Hellfire Boy's death and remembers his wishes to be buried in Egypt. Noticing a poster promoting a cheap world tour, he capitalizes and reaches the Great Pyramid of Giza. While browsing a bakery, he spots a malt loaf and places Hellfire Boy's mask on it before eating it.
10	"King's Intervention"; Transliteration: "Ō no Sokaku" (Japanese: 王の阻隔)	February 25, 2013
Entering a pyramid, Inferno Cop traverses its trap-laden interior and discovers its sarcophagus. Pharaoh Khnum-Khufu appears from it, angered that Inferno Cop's noise woke him up after just 15 hours of sleep, and challenges him to a fight. Inferno Cop is overpowered before he summons seven multicolored flames that combine into a larger, lethal flame that kills Khnum-Khufu. Satisfied, Inferno Cop enters the sarcophagus and prepares to sleep when he receives a phone call from the police chief.
11	"Condemn the Evil, Part 1"; Transliteration: "Danzaiseyo, Jigoku no Keiji (Zenpen)" (Japanese: 断罪せよ、地獄の刑事(前編))	March 4, 2013
The police chief orders Inferno Cop to return to headquarters, which is quickly destroyed by an alien spaceship along with the rest of Jack Knife Edge Town. Inferno Cop is captured by mysterious winged creatures. Southern Cross' head priest explains the aliens seek to use Inferno Cop's power and fake god status to initiate the Third Destroy Finale, a mass extinction event that would turn him into a legitimate god. A bright light then engulfs the world.
12	"Condemn the Evil, Part 2"; Transliteration: "Danzaiseyo, Jigoku no Keiji (Kōhen)" (Japanese: 断罪せよ、地獄の刑事(後編))	March 11, 2013
Once the light dissipates, Inferno Cop lands back on earth and encounters multiple clones of himself. The pregnant woman he saved shows up and reveals herself as Claudia, a misanthrope who has the power to change the world; Claudia explains she had fallen in love with him, prompting her to create many copies of him that would replace humanity as revenge for its vices and horrors. While initially attracted by her proposal, Inferno Cop profusely vomits, freeing a mostly-undigested Hellfire Boy who urges him to continue his mission. Inspired, Inferno Cop eats him and regains his flames.
13	"Let's Search For Tomorrow"; Transliteration: "Rettsu Sāchi Fō Tumorō" (Japanese: レッツ サーチ フォー トゥモロー)	March 18, 2013
Receiving the power of the real god, Inferno Cop evolves into Glitter Inferno Cop and frees humanity from Claudia's hold. Supported by those he had encountered, including the return of Mecha Cop and Auntie Grenda, he leads a mounted charge with his Devil's Satan Hellhound Grenda's Kind Hand, an attack that engulfs him and Claudia in an explosion. After the explosion subsides, Hellfire Boy watches as Inferno Cop's badge falls to the ground.

== Special episodes ==
There are three special episodes of Inferno Cop only shown at the 2015, 2016, and 2017 AnimeNEXT conventions. While the episodes have never been uploaded officially, one recording of the third episode is on Youtube. However, the recording only captures half of the episode. The episode starts at the end of Inferno Cop's cameo appearance in Space Patrol Luluco. Afterwards, Inferno Cop goes to America and loses a fight with Donald Trump. All three of the specials are notable for showcasing Studio Trigger's self-professed love for New Jersey, and for audience participation at the end of every short.

The 2015 special is the same short shown during a prior convention that year (Anime Expo). The 2016 special involves Inferno Cop and friends traveling to New Jersey to stop hardcore and casual anime fans from waging war against each other, which Inferno Cop remedies by killing both sides. Afterwards, he leads both his friends and the audience at the live panel in chanting "New Jersey Oi!" for 5 minutes straight. The 2017 special involves Inferno Cop criticizing Donald Trump while watching him on TV, only for the later to threaten to deport him through the television and the two engage in short-lived combat (in which Inferno Cop is cut in half and screams about how he is dying for an extended amount of time) Afterwards Inferno Cop leads both the cast and the Panel audience in singing "the American National Anthem" (A rendition of The Star Spangled Banner but with the lyrics replaced with "America daisuki, Hamburger daisuki" (I love America, I love Hamburger)) for at least 5 minutes.

== China ban ==
On June 12, 2015, the Chinese Ministry of Culture listed Inferno Cop among 38 anime and manga titles banned in China.

== Cameo ==
In episode 11 of Space Patrol Luluco, Inferno Cop makes a cameo appearance, where it is revealed that he worked for Space Patrol before becoming a vigilante.

In episode 8 of New Panty & Stocking with Garterbelt, a very similar character named Impact Cop gets Panty and Stocking's help to destroy the root of all evil, the internet. The next segment has the trio fighting the true root of all evil.
