= Fighting Vipers 2 =

1998 video game

- European Dreamcast box art
- Developer: Sega AM2
- Publisher: Sega
- Director: Hiroshi Kataoka
- Producer: Yu Suzuki
- Programmer: Hideya Shibazaki
- Artists: Yoji Kato; Imai Toonz
- Composer: Hidenori Shoji
- Platforms: Arcade, Dreamcast
- Release: Arcade: JP: March 1998; UK: August 1998; NA: 1998; Dreamcast: JP: January 18, 2001; EU: March 2, 2001
- Genre: Fighting
- Modes: Single-player, multiplayer
- Arcade system: Sega Model 3

Fighting Vipers 2 is a 1998 fighting video game produced by Sega. It is the sequel to 1995's Fighting Vipers and was released for the Sega Model 3 arcade system, before being ported to the Dreamcast in 2001.

== Gameplay ==
The armor system, dashes, and the ability to hurl an opponent through a wall are all retained from the original Fighting Vipers. In addition, Fighting Vipers 2 adds on Super K.O.s, which allow players to defeat an opponent in a single round (instead of by winning two out of three rounds) using a specifically timed multicombo attack.

== Characters ==
Fighting Vipers 2 features all 10 characters from the arcade version of the first game, along with four new characters, the latter two of which must be unlocked:

- Emi, a primary school student who fights with a self-developed mecha armor.
- Charlie, a BMX rider and a rival and classmate of Picky.
- Del Sol, a mysterious Sun masked luchador who presumably hails from Japan. Originally a character from an unreleased Atomiswave arcade game known as Force Five.
- Kuhn, a copycat character who uses the rest of the cast's moves, similar to Virtua Fighter's Dural.

== Development and release ==
AM2's Hiroshi Kataoka told Sega Saturn Magazine that development began in early 1997 after work on Fighters Megamix for the Saturn had concluded, and lasted for ten months. Members of the development team visited Alcatraz early on in the project for inspiration for the caged stages and the character designs were inspired by the "fashionable sports that are being played by young people today, such as BMX riding and skateboarding along with their associated music culture". Motion capture was utilised for the opening sequences and winning and losing poses, but the majority of animation was done by hand.

Both of the new characters were designed by Imai Toonz.

Fighting Vipers 2 was planned for a release on Dreamcast in the United States, but this was later cancelled. The game appears as a playable arcade game in the 2023 video game Like a Dragon Gaiden: The Man Who Erased His Name, marking the game's first ever official re-release since the Dreamcast port.

== Reception ==
In Japan, Game Machine listed Fighting Vipers 2 on their June 15, 1998 issue as being the second most-successful arcade game of the month.

Jim Preston reviewed the Dreamcast version of the game for Next Generation, rating it three stars out of five, and stated that "Dreamcast software sales were always sluggish in Japan, and with mediocre titles like this it's not hard to see why."

On release, Famitsu magazine scored the Dreamcast version of the game a 30 out of 40.

Contemporary French reviews were mixed: Jeuxvideo.com said the action remained dynamic but the visuals were outdated and gave the game a 12/20 score, while Gamekult found the Dreamcast conversion fairly faithful to the arcade original but felt it arrived too late in the console's life to look technically impressive.
