= Fighting Vipers =

1995 video game

- Japanese arcade flyer
- Developer: Sega AM2
- Publisher: Sega
- Producer: Yu Suzuki
- Designer: Hiroshi Takaoka
- Composer: David Leytze
- Platforms: Arcade, Sega Saturn, PlayStation 2, PlayStation 3, Xbox 360
- Release: November 1995: Arcade; JP/NA: November 1995; EU: 1996 Saturn; JP: August 30, 1996; NA: October 29, 1996; EU: October 31, 1996 PlayStation 3; NA: November 27, 2012; JP: November 28, 2012; PAL: December 5, 2012 Xbox 360; WW: November 28, 2012
- Genre: Fighting
- Modes: Single-player, multiplayer
- Arcade system: Sega Model 2

Fighting Vipers (Note: (ファイティングバイパーズ Faitingu Vaipāzu)) is a 1995 fighting video game developed by Sega AM2 and published by Sega for arcades. A 3D fighter, it uses the same game engine as AM2's Virtua Fighter 2 (1994), but features enclosed arenas and an armor mechanic, and was targeted more towards Western audiences, using a U.S. setting and more freeform styles of martial arts.

The game was released in November 1995 in arcades, using the Sega Model 2 hardware, before it was ported to the Sega Saturn home console in 1996. Though Fighting Vipers was not very popular in North American arcades, the Saturn version was one of the most high-profile games in the system's 1996 holiday lineup, and was met with positive reviews. A sequel was made, Fighting Vipers 2 (1998), and all characters in the original also appeared in a crossover with Virtua Fighter 2, Fighters Megamix (1996).

The story of Fighting Vipers focuses on a group of fighters known as Vipers who take part in a fighting tournament called Nutcrack that is held in a metropolis called Armstone City at the behest of its mayor.

== Gameplay ==
Fighting Vipers features a similar style of gameplay to Sega AM2's more renowned Virtua Fighter series, specifically Virtua Fighter 2, using simply guard, punch and kick attack buttons with a focus on combo moves. The Saturn version uses its three extra buttons for three smaller combos.

Each of the 9 characters featured in the game wears armor that can be broken off by opponents, leaving them more vulnerable to taking damage. A human shaped meter in the top corners of the screen monitors damage to the armor. Walls surround each arena, caging the combatants in, allowing for attacks in conjunction with them (bouncing off etc.). If a knockout attack is strong enough, characters can knock their opponent over, on top, or straight through the walls.

The Saturn port of Fighting Vipers added Playback Mode and Training Mode, both of which are now used widely in the fighting genre. Players could save their matches and play them again in Playback Mode, while Training Mode talked the player through the moves of each character one-by-one. The Saturn version also included a Team Battle mode, allowing players to assemble teams of up to five characters for consecutive battles.

== Characters ==
Main Characters

- Bahn:

Despite only being a 17-year-old high school student, Bahn is a powerful and imposing fighter in a long coat and hat. Hailing from Nishino Town, Japan and declared himself as Genghis Bahn III, he has come overseas to find and take revenge against his father, whom he has never met and abandoned him and his mother when he was a boy. In Fighting Vipers 2, Bahn is still searching for his father, but returns to Armstone City after learning of B.M. still being in control of the mayoralty of Armstone City and the 'Viper Hunt' that he has organized, and fights once against to settle the score with the evil mayor.
Voiced by Sega designer Kazunori Oh in the first two main games, and Hiroki Takahashi in Project X Zone.

- Candy (Honey in the Japanese version):

A petite 16-year-old fashion student with a pleasant nature who wishes to become an apparel designer, Candy designed her own trademark plastic fairy costume herself, and has entered the tournament to promote her original fashion line.

- Grace:

A 19-year-old African-American born in Armstone City whose armor is themed after the protective gear for inline skating, including the skates themselves. Grace is making her living as a fashion model. Though she once dreamed of becoming a professional figure skater, her lover and coach betrayed her, leaving her disillusioned. She channels her anger into her fighting. In Fighting Vipers 2, Grace finds herself subjected to numerous workplace harassments; presumably as a result of the 'Viper Hunt.'

- Raxel:

The narcissistic lead singer and guitarist for a hair metal band called 'Death Crunch' with Kiss-styled armor and a red Gibson Flying-V electric guitar, Raxel is the son of an Armstone City councilman, a dropout who left home after a fight with his father. Raxel enters the tournament to become famous. In Fighting Vipers 2, however, it is revealed that although Raxel was able to make a major debut the pressure placed on him by Armstone City as a result of him previously being a Viper prevents Raxel from even holding live performances; prompting him to fight once more.

- Tokio:

A 16-year-old Japanese American pretty boy with a sense of justice rebelling against a strict kabuki actor's household. Tokio is a former leader of a street gang called 'Black Thunder' but left after feeling responsible for the death of another gang member. In Fighting Vipers 2, after having previously retired from fighting following the previous Nutcrack tournament, Tokio becomes a Viper once more after learning of his old comrades being imprisoned as a result of the 'Viper Hunt.'

- Sanman:

A mysterious man about whom nothing is known, other than his birthday (3 March) and a love for the number 3, hence his name (san is Japanese for "three"). Although they are not very close, at the time of Fighting Vipers 2 Picky sometimes uses him as a chauffeur.

- Jane:

A butch and muscled 18-year-old part-time construction worker, Jane trained her whole life to join the Marines, but after causing an incident she was rejected from enlisting. Jane now wants to test just how tough she is, hence her reason for entering the Nutcrack tournament.
Voiced by Cara Jones.

- Picky:

A 14-year old Junior High School student, Picky previously got into skateboarding to impress his classmate Catherine, but when the Nutcrack tournament grew in popularity Picky decided to take part in it. Despite his efforts, it is revealed in Fighting Vipers 2 that Picky was rejected by Catherine, but despite this continues to fight; wishing to develop his skills further. Picky's armor is styled after protective gear for skateboarders. He carries his skateboard on his back, and hits opponents with it.

- Mahler:

A mysterious 20-year-old masked wrestler and unlockable character who wears a poisonous snake armor and holds a grudge against the Mayor of Armstone City (who has organised the tournament). In Fighting Vipers 2, following the end of the tournament in the previous game, Mahler disappears for two years (during which time he is believed to have honed his skills by taking part in wrestling), but returns to Armstone City to fight and defeat B.M. (whom Mahler is a relative of) and restore justice to the city’s government.

- B.M.:

The main antagonist of the series, he is the mayor of Armstone City and in fact the organizer of the Fighting Vipers tournament (known as 'Nutcrack') which B.M. uses as a cover for a major gambling operation that he and his associates profit from. The Vipers learn of this, and confront B.M. directly. In Fighting Vipers 2 however, which takes place 2 years after the events of the first game, its revealed that despite the stand that the Vipers took against B.M. he managed to retain the mayoralty of Armstone City, and gets an ordinance passed banning Nutcrack and launching a 'Viper Hunt' to remove Vipers from Armstone City; resulting in many Vipers being incarcerated on a prison island and others stop being Vipers. The remaining Vipers, however, take a stand against B.M.

Sega Saturn exclusive guest characters

- Kumachan: a 10-year-old smiling bear character wearing an orange hat, who is included as an unlockable character in the Sega Saturn port. It is based on the giant floating balloon mascot seen in the Old Armstone Town stage. It uses Sanman's fighting style, and its 2nd player counterpart is called Pandachan. Even though it can fight, its 3D model never moves.
- Pepsiman: the Japanese mascot of Pepsi who only appears in the Japanese Sega Saturn version of the game as an unlockable character. He was removed from the US and PAL releases.

== Development ==
Fighting Vipers was developed using the same game engine which was first used for Virtua Fighter 2, and uses a nearly identical arcade board, though with slightly faster processing speed. Unlike Virtua Fighter 2, there are no ring-outs; producer Yu Suzuki stated, "We received comments about the ring-outs in VF indicating different changes, [sic] and so for FV the fighting can continue mercilessly."

The character Mahler was created by reducing the power specifications of the boss, B.M., so that he would be appropriately balanced for player vs. player matches.

A demo of the game was displayed at the 1995 JAMMA show with all eight characters playable, though they did not yet have all their moves available.

The Saturn conversion, like the arcade original, was developed by Sega AM2. The programming team consisted of 15 people, most of whom had worked on the Saturn version of Virtua Fighter 2, and some of whom had worked on the arcade version of Fighting Vipers. Work on the conversion began in the first quarter of 1996 and took eight months. In an interview published in July 1996, AM2 developer Hiroshi Kataoka explained that the Saturn version demonstrated at the Tokyo Toy Show was approximately 50% complete. The team had prioritised graphical effects for the demonstration at the expense of performance, which Kataoka intended to improve before release. After converting the Virtua Fighter 2 engine, the team focused first on recreating the barriers, as they anticipated this would be the most difficult part to accomplish on the Saturn hardware. Because armor and walls can be broken in the game, there was no easy way of reducing the number of polygons in those elements. In part to compensate for the lower polygon counts on the characters, a new form of dynamic lighting incorporating Gouraud shading was added to the Saturn version. In order to make this effect possible, and have the game run at a speed comparable to the arcade version, the team decided at the beginning of development that they would not use the Saturn's high-resolution mode.

The Saturn version was also released in South Korea in 1996 by Samsung Electronics, under the catalogue number GS-9610J.

=== Regional differences ===
The original Japanese version had a large amount of advertising for Pepsi, due to product placement agreements with Sega at the time. This licensing was removed in the US and PAL versions because the promotional campaign involving Pepsi was never taken outside of Japan.

In the Japanese version, the character Candy is named Honey.

== Reception ==
Reception

Aggregate score
Aggregator	Score
Metacritic	71/100 (X360)

Review scores
Publication	Score
Computer and Video Games	5/5 (ARC, SAT)
Electronic Gaming Monthly	6.625/10 (SAT)
Famitsu	37/40 (SAT)
GameSpot	8/10 (SAT)
Next Generation	3/5 (ARC); 5/5 (SAT)
Sega Saturn Magazine	94% (SAT)

In Japan, Game Machine listed Fighting Vipers on their December 15, 1995 issue as being the most popular arcade game at the time. It went on to be one of the top five highest-grossing arcade printed circuit board (PCB) software of 1996 in Japan. It was considerably less popular in North American arcades.

Reviewing the arcade version, Next Generation called Fighting Vipers "a beautiful, highly polished, polygon-rendered and texture-mapped game featuring brand new characters, unprecedented closed-in arenas (for a 3D fighter), a slightly different set of fighting strategies using armor, and a more cinematic style of viewing." The reviewer also praised the more intuitive button combinations used to execute moves. Despite this, he concluded that the game fails to measure up to recent fighting games, chiefly due to the "strained" character designs: "Raxel, Jane, Picky, Sanman are undeniably trendy and conclusively uncool ... They lack the artful, graceful movements of VF2's Lau, Sarah, or Pai."

In reviews for the Saturn version, the barrier mechanics - allowing players to beat opponents against or through walls and use them to launch attacks - were met with universal approval. Most were also enthusiastic about being able to break off an opponent's armor for extra damage, though Crispin Boyer and Sushi-X of Electronic Gaming Monthly felt the amount of flesh exposed when a fighter's armor is broken off amounted to cheap lewdness. While some complained of reduced polygon counts and occasional slowdown compared to the arcade version, the conversion to the Saturn as a whole was well-regarded, with critics especially praising its retention of the arcade version's smooth animation, its use of light sourcing, and the Saturn-exclusive features. GameSpot concluded, "If you have a Saturn, this is the fighting game to own. If you don't, Fighting Vipers gives you a good reason to get one." GamePro said it "is one of our favorites because it's fast, sexy, and easy." And while most critics felt that Fighting Vipers clearly falls short of Virtua Fighter 2, Rich Leadbetter of Sega Saturn Magazine said it "is far more of a gratifying experience to the average gamer than VF or its sequel" and a Next Generation reviewer concluded, "VF2 is one of the best games of all time, but Fighting Vipers nearly eclipses it." In Japan, Famitsu scored it 37 out of 40.

In the January 1997 issue of the magazine Computer and Video Games, Fighting Vipers ranked 14th on the magazine's UK multi-format sales chart. In the February 1997 issue, the game ranked fifth on the magazine's American multi-format sales chart.

== Legacy ==
=== Sequels and re-releases ===
A sequel, Fighting Vipers 2 was released, introducing new characters. It was ported to the Dreamcast but only in Japan and Europe.

All of the Fighting Vipers characters were used in Sega AM2's Fighters Megamix for the Sega Saturn. Fighting Vipers was also re-released for the PlayStation 2 as part of the Sega Ages line. A PAL version was planned, but never released.

Fighting Vipers was re-released in late 2012 on PlayStation Network and Xbox Live as one of five games included in the Sega Model 2 Collection. The re-release features online play, but does not contain any of the extra content found in the Saturn version. Fighting Vipers is also included as a playable arcade game in Judgment and Lost Judgment.

Bahn appears as a solo unit in Project X Zone, a Nintendo 3DS RPG crossover of Capcom, Sega and Namco Bandai Games.

=== Sonic the Fighters ===
A programmer working on Fighting Vipers put Sonic the Hedgehog and Tails in the game for amusement, which led to Sega AM2 commissioning a Sonic fighting game, Sonic the Fighters. Hidden within the data of the arcade version of Sonic the Fighters is an additional character named Honey, a yellow cat wearing Candy's red plastic fairy costume. She is only playable by hacking the game's data. Honey's model was removed from the Sonic the Fighters port on Sonic Gems Collection. However, in the Xbox 360 and PlayStation 3 port, she is a playable character, and was later introduced to the cast of Archie Comics' Sonic the Hedgehog comics during an arc based on Sonic the Fighters. The arc depicts Honey as a fashion designer similar to her human counterpart, and also features a boar character based on Jane.
