= Honey Mustard (manhwa) =

2005 manhwa by Ho-Kyung Yeo

Honey Mustard is a 2005 Korean manhwa by Ho-Kyung Yeo, published in the U.S. by TokyoPop. Under the genre of comedy romance, it follows the life of Ara, as she continuously finds herself in the wrong places at the wrong times which leads to a 'marriage' between herself and Young-Woo, a boy she hardly knows. Caught up between conflicting emotions for a family that treats her like trash and the contractual marriage that she was persuaded to accept, she must deal with the fact that she still has feelings for her first (albeit one-sided) love, Jung Hanil.

Ho-Kyung Yeo has an art-style similar to that of Miwa Ueda (author of Peach Girl), and seems to enjoy utilizing the SD-form of her characters for any situation.

The Manhwa has been dropped by the manhwaga (cartoonist); it runs for four volumes.

== Main characters ==
Ara: An average high school student in her junior year. Her life is turned upside-down after a school field trip where she decides she needs some 'liquid courage' so she can confess to her long-time crush, Hanil, but accidentally gets caught in a compromising situation with Young-Woo, an innocent passer-by on the run from a gang of thugs.

Young-Woo (Young-Chil): A high-school junior, he gets caught in a compromising situation with Ara, and his grandfather decides it's best that they get married even though both swear that nothing happened (which is the truth).
