= Hiroyuki Imaishi =

Japanese animator and director (born 1971)

- 今石 洋之
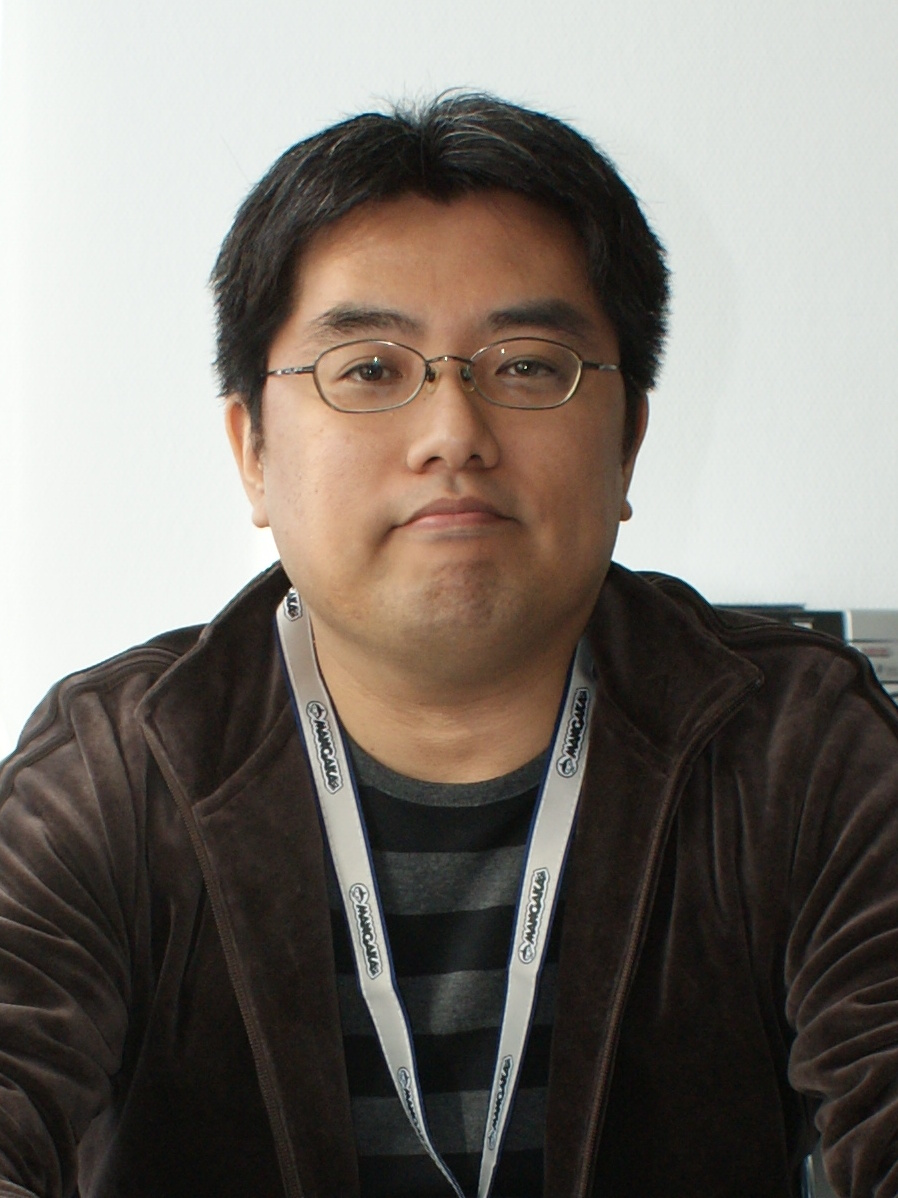
- Imaishi in 2008
- Born: October 4, 1971 (age 54); Tokyo, Japan
- Occupations: Anime director, animator, character designer
- Years active: 1995–present

Hiroyuki Imaishi (今石 洋之, Imaishi Hiroyuki; born October 4, 1971) is a Japanese anime director, animator and co-founder of Studio Trigger. His style is marked by fast and frantic animation combined with elaborate storyboarding and punchy direction. Prior to founding Trigger, he was an animator and director at Gainax. His most well-known works include Gurren Lagann (2007), Panty & Stocking with Garterbelt (2010), Kill la Kill (2013), Promare (2019), and Cyberpunk: Edgerunners (2022).

== Early career ==
After drawing manga for the doujinshi circle, Imaishi worked as a creator. He worked at Gainax in 1995 as an in-between animator for Neon Genesis Evangelion. Some of his early works include animation direction, storyboarding and key animation for Kare Kano (His and Her Circumstances), FLCL, Diebuster, Oval X Over, and the ending animation of Paradise Kiss. He went on to direct Dead Leaves, a 2004 anime film produced by Production I.G. and the first episode of Re: Cutie Honey.

== Director ==
His series director debut was Tengen Toppa Gurren Lagann (2007). The anime received an Excellence Prize at the 2007 Japan Media Arts Festival, and Imaishi himself received an individual award at the twelfth Animation Kobe Festival. In 2008, the anime received both "best television production" and "best character design" from the Tokyo International Anime Fair. Later he went on to work as director in the anime series, Panty & Stocking with Garterbelt. His main influence of being an animator and director are Yoshinori Kanada and his works, in which all his anime titles such as Dead Leaves, Gurren Lagann and Panty & Stocking with Garterbelt pay special tributes to him and his art. Imaishi left Gainax and established Studio Trigger in 2011. His first directorial work at the studio is Kill la Kill. He directed the opening for season 2 of Black Dynamite.

== Notable works ==
=== Director ===
- Magical Shopping Arcade Abenobashi (2002) (episode 3)
- Dead Leaves (2004)
- Re: Cutie Honey (2004) (episode 1)
- Oval x Over (2005)
- Gurren Lagann (2007)
- Panty & Stocking with Garterbelt (2010)
- Kill la Kill (2013)
- Japan Animator Expo (2015) ("Sex & Violence with Machspeed")
- Space Patrol Luluco (2016)
- Promare (2019)
- Star Wars: Visions (2021) ("The Twins")
- Cyberpunk: Edgerunners (2022)
- New Panty & Stocking with Garterbelt (2025)

=== Other ===
- Neon Genesis Evangelion (1995) In-Between Animator
- Kare Kano (His and Her Circumstances) (1998) Storyboard, Key Animator, Animation Director, Script (ep. 19)
- Medabots (1999) Animation Director (episode 14), Key Animator
- FLCL (2000) Animation Director (episode 5)
- PaRappa the Rapper (2001) Ending Animation Director (ED1)
- Fullmetal Alchemist (2003) Key Animator (episodes 4, 22)
- Musashi: Samurai Legend (2005)
- Namco × Capcom (2005) Animation Supervisor, Storyboard, Animation Producer, Director, Animation Character Design, Art Supervisor, Key Animation
- Redline (2009) Key Animator
- Black Rock Shooter (2012) Director (CG Battle)
- Inferno Cop (2012) Supervisor
- Ninja Slayer (2015) Character Designer
- OK K.O.! Let's Be Heroes (2017) Storyboard Artist for opening titles
- BNA: Brand New Animal (2020), Storyboard Artist (episode 5)
