= Honey (surname) =

Honey is the surname of:

- Avon Honey (1947–2010), American politician
- David Honey (born 1958), Australian politician
- Edward George Honey (1885–1922), Australian soldier and journalist
- Edwin Earle Honey (1891–1956), American plant pathologist and mycologist
- Gary Honey (born 1959), Australian retired long jumper
- George Honey (1822–1880), British actor, comedian and singer
- Jesse Honey (born 1977), English urban planner
- John Honey (1781–1813), 19-year-old student who rescued five men from drowning
- Josh Honey (born 2001), Australian rules footballer
- Lady Clover Honey, American drag queen
- Michael Honey (born 1947), American historian and professor
- Nancy Honey, American photographer
- Norm Honey (1914–1994), Australian rules footballer
- P. J. Honey (1922–2005), Irish-born Vietnamese language scholar and historian
- Robert Honey (fl. 1961–94), retired Royal Air Force air vice marshal
- Russell Honey (1921–2007), Canadian politician
- Stan Honey (born 1955), American navigator
- Tayla Honey (born 1997), Australian netball player
