= Honuj =

Honuj هنوج
- Village
- Location within Iran
- Coordinates: 30°19′51″N 56°46′42″E
- Country: Iran
- Province: Kerman
- County: Kerman
- Bakhsh: Central
- Rural District: Ekhtiarabad

Population (2006)
  - Total: 67
- Time zone: UTC+3:30 (IRST)

Honuj (Persian: هنوج, also Romanized as Honūj and Henuj; also known as Honū, Honūk, Huni, and Hūtak) is a village in Ekhtiarabad Rural District, in the Central District of Kerman County, Kerman Province, Iran. At the 2006 census, its population was 67, in 20 families.
