= Color Media International =

Serbian media company

- Type: d.o.o.
- Industry: Media
- Founded: 1 November 2001; 24 years ago (Current form); Founded in 1992
- Headquarters: Temerinska 102, Novi Sad, Serbia
- Area served: Serbia, Slovenia, Croatia, Bosnia and Herzegovina, Montenegro, North Macedonia
- Key people: Milan Šobot (Director)
- Products: Magazines
- Revenue: ▼€7.54 million (2023)
- Net income: ▲€0.28 million (2023)
- Total assets: ▼€8.20 million (2023)
- Total equity: ▼€5.59 million (2023)
- Owner: Velibor Đurović (50%); Robert Čoban (40%); Milan Šobot (10%)
- Number of employees: 180 (2023)
- Subsidiaries: Color Print; Color Media; Monte Color; Kolor Media d.o.e.l. Mediatop International
- Website: www.color.rs

The Color Media International, formerly known as Color Press Group, is a Serbian media company based in Novi Sad, Serbia. The company publishes periodical print media such as lifestyle magazines, weekly tabloids, and glossy publications. Its various publications sell over two million copies each month, amounting to an annual revenue stream of over 20 million euros.

It is registered as a limited liability company (LLC) and contains assets in Serbia, Slovenia, Croatia, Bosnia-Herzegovina, Montenegro, and North Macedonia. Currently, the company publishes 84 periodicals, including its centerpiece publications, weekly tabloid Svet and monthly health/lifestyle magazine Lepota i zdravlje.

== History ==
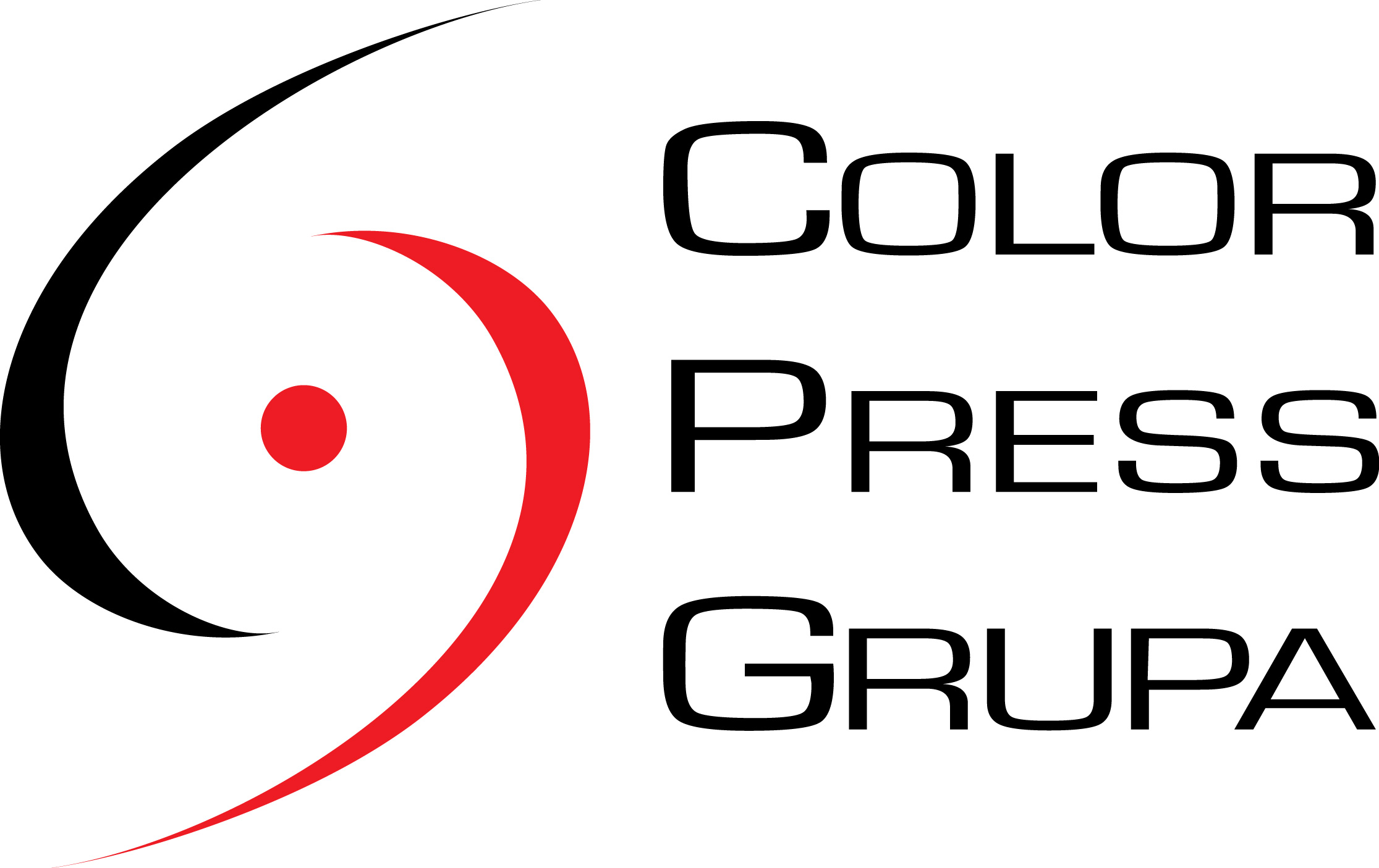
Former logo

1992-1995

The company was founded in April 1992 when Robert Čoban and Velibor Đurović began publishing a biweekly student paper called Index at the University of Novi Sad.

After initial political and financial hardships, the paper grew into a biweekly magazine called Svet (The World), focused mainly on politics, the war in the Bosnia and Croatia region, and crime growth in Serbia. The circulation ranged from 3,000 to 10,000 copies and was printed by the printing house Forum in Novi Sad. Simultaneously, a company called Svet Press, owned by Coban and Djurovic, was created to oversee the magazine.

1996–1999

The magazine changed its format from Berliner to tabloid after transferring to the printing house Borba in Belgrade. These changes caused a gradual shift in concept, Svet became a magazine focused on entertainment and celebrity lifestyles and published some of the first paparazzo photographs in the history of Serbian publishing. In the following years, as a part of the publishing house Svet Press, the following editions have been started: Zona (The Zone), Moja tajna (My Secret), Moja romansa (My Romance), Moje srce (My Heart) and Teen Story, the first magazine printed abroad (Revai Nyomda, Budapest) on glossy paper. In December 1996, in cooperation with the Open Society Fund, a special edition of Svet was published dedicated to crime growth and the police torture of citizens in Serbia.

At the beginning of the NATO bombing in March 1999, the magazines were not issued for a few days. However, in April the complete production continued with a reduced number of pages and material adapted to the new circumstances. In the months following the NATO bombing, Svet Press published their first two enigmatic magazines, Skandi svet and Sfinga (The Sphynx), and culinary magazines, Tajne kuhinje (Kitchen Secrets) and Slatke tajne (Sweet Secrets). These magazines are no longer published.

In August 1999, Svet Press established its first daughter company, Svet Print (The World Print), in Banjaluka. Four months later, an additional daughter company, Monte Color, was established in Podgorica.

At the Frankfurt book fair in 1999, Svet Press concluded its first license contract and started publishing the British children's magazine Junior, which is still published today.

2000–2001

At the beginning of the new millennium, Svet press started several of its brands, including Lepota i zdravlje (Health and Beauty), Moja beba (My Baby), and a variety of enigmatic magazines and love stories. The company further expanded into Sarajevo, the capital of Bosnia-Herzegovina. Svet magazine, the company’s basic publication, increased the number of colour pages and introduced glossy covers, which resulted in a rise in circulation. A New Year's edition from December 2001 published 250,000 copies. By the end of 2001, Svet Press established the company Svet Verlag with headquarters in Hamburg and began a European issue of Svet.

2002–2003

In the summer of 2002, negotiations were made with the German company Heinrich Bauer Verlag from Hamburg. This resulted in the publishing of Bravo, a biweekly magazine for teenagers that has gained the highest circulation in Europe. At the same time, magazines Joy and Lea were introduced at a party celebrating ten years of the company. Joy, the first women's monthly licensed magazine in Serbia, was started in cooperation with Swiss company Marquard Media AG and still has the highest circulation in this sector today. Biweekly magazine Lea is no longer published.

In 2003, CKM, the first licensed male magazine in Serbia, and Bravo Girl, a monthly magazine for teenage girls, began in cooperation with Marquard Media AG. The company further expanded with companies in Macedonia and Croatia and founded a small printing house called Color Print as part of the Color Press Group. Color Print began by publishing only crossword puzzles and love stories but now publishes over 2,000,000 magazine copies from the company’s portfolio.

2004–2006

In 2004, the company had a dynamic development, starting several dozens of new domestic and licensed editions in Serbia and the region including: TV Novele (TV Novellas), Bravo ScreenFun, FHM, Auto Start, Brava Casa, Lekovito Bilje (Medicinal Plants), Astro, Mobi and a large number of children's, enigmatic and love magazines. In association with Video Top, a company from Maribor, Color Press Group established JV companies in Slovenia and Croatia, which jointly published Bravo, Brava Casa, FHM, Lepota i Zdravlje, and numerous love stories and children's publications.

2007–2008

In January 2007, a party celebrating 15 years of the company and the 500th issue of Svet magazine was held at MB Brewery for 1,200 employees and guests. It was also the occasion for filming a five-minute promo clip about company history and publishing a special edition of Svet magazine celebrating the Jubilee.

On July 19, 2007, a launch party at Beli dvor celebrated the first issue of Hello!, the oldest celebrity magazine. Additionally, a variety of magazines were issued in 2007 including a specialized magazine, Moja kosa (My hair); a monthly health magazine with high circulation Top zdravlje (Top Health); magazines Kuhinjica and Dobra hrana (in cooperation with a production company, Skorpion); Bauer's biweekly female magazine, Tina; Burda; Moje dete; and specialized bi-monthly magazine, Beauty Expert.

In 2007, the company published six out of the 12 magazines with the highest circulation in Serbia with Svet, their basic publication, at the top.

In June 2008, Hello! magazine, a biweekly publication, began being published weekly and the company received a June Award from the Regional Chamber of Commerce in Novi Sad.

In 2008, the company reached a record for circulation in the region after issues of Lepota i zdravlje were released for the market of Bosnia-Herzegovina and Slovenia. The Macedonian (May) and Croatian (July) issues were also published. In July, the circulation of Lepota i zdravlje in Bosnia-Herzegovina reached more than 31,000 copies, hitting a new record. The project Lepota i zdravlje went international at the fair of magazine licenses in Moscow (organized by FIPP) and for the first time, the company offered one of its licenses in the international market.

In September 2008, company headquarters in Novi Sad were relocated to a new commercial building (owned by the company) on Temerinska street for the first time in 16 years.

In December, the company launched its regional website, which became the most popular show business website in the region within a couple of months.

By the end of 2008, the company had daughter companies from Bosnia-Herzegovina, Montenegro, Slovenia, Croatia and Macedonia as well as correspondence offices in Frankfurt, Wien, Basel, Paris and many other European cities. The company had over 350 permanent employees and approximately 150 part-time associates.

2009 - 2010

In the first quarter of 2009, when the economic crisis had already swept through all sections of society including the media industry, the company was the only publisher among the great publishers in Serbia that recorded a rise in advertising income amounting to 33%. However, the recession forced the company to close down several magazines, such as Moje dete (My Child), Pony, Lepe princeze (Pretty Princesses) and Junior, as well as limit publication of FHM and Bravo Girl to tri-monthly.

In the first half of 2010, the company launched the sixth regional issue of their most successful magazine, Ljepota i zdravlje (Beauty and Health), a Montenegrin issue, and a female lifestyle website.

By the end of 2010, Italian fashion magazine Grazia had taken over in Croatia with the license of publishing house Mondadori. A beauty website was launched and, apart from the Serbian edition, a Croatian edition of The Economist yearbook "The World in 2011" was published including the licensed quarterly magazine Savršeno venčanje (Perfect Wedding).

2011

In the first months of 2011, the company launched the Bosnian, Croatian and Macedonian editions of the magazine Pošalji recept (Send The Recipe). In Serbia, new interactive magazines Mamina škola (Mother's School) and Moja priča (My Story) were also published.

2012

In June, the company entered into a partnership agreement with the Serbian Olympic Committee for the Olympic cycle leading up to the 2016 Olympic Games in Rio de Janeiro.

2013 - 2015

In this period, Color Press Group expanded its activities beyond pring publishing, developing a growing portfolio of conferences, festival and branded events. During this period, the company organized and developed event formats such as Pro Femina, Food Talk, Digital, Book Talk, CSR Srbija and Nova energija. The company also strengthened its digital presence.

2016 - 2018

Between 2016 and 2018, company continued expanding its media portfolio and event activities. In 2016, it launched Diplomacy & Commerce, its first English-language magazine. During this period, company also added several well-known media brands to its portfolio, including Gloria, Story and Lisa Moj stan. In 2018, Color Press Group stated that Auto Bild became the 100th title in its portfolio. Alongside publishing, the company continued to organize conferences, festivals and cultural events in Serbia and the region.

2019 - 2021

From 2019 to 2021, Color Press Group continued to develop social, cultural and corporate social responsibility campaigns, including projects focused on rural women, people with disabilities, mental health, cultural heritage and environmental topics. During the COVID-19 pandemic, the company adapted a number of its events and conferences to online or hybrid formats, while some events continued to be organized in person where circumstances allowed. The company also continued to launch new print and digital editions during this period.

2022 - 2023

In 2022 and 2023, the company expanded its activities in the fields of culture, tourism, gastronomy and public events. The company was involved in the revival of organization of several cultural and public manifestations, including the Petrovaradin Carnival and other regional events. In 2023, Color Media organized the project Važno je zvati se Milica Jovanović which set a Guinness World Record for the largest gathering of people with the same first and last name. The same year, the company launched the Serbian edition of the French fashion magazine Marie Claire.

2024 - 2026

In 2024, the company continued to organize its established conferences, festivals and branded events and launched the magazine Super Žena. In 2025, the company launched several new publications, including the Croatin edition of Marie Claire, Praznična kuhinja, Nonini kolači, Air Fryer, Dijeta bez gladovanja and Psihologija za sve. That year, the company moved its headquarters from Temerinska 102 to Mileve Simić 27 in Novi Sad. In 2026, new titles included Žena i zdravlje, Balans and Uskršnja kuhinja. The company also reported new media collaborations, including television formats produces with Euronews Serbia and Una TV.

== Publications ==
- Svet (since 1992, weekly)
- Magična zona (since 1997, monthly)
- Moja beba (since October 2000, monthly)
- Lepota & Zdravlje (since 2001, monthly)
- Bravo (foreign licensed Serbian edition of the German teen magazine, since 2002, bi-weekly)
- Alan Ford (Italian comic strip, since 2003, monthly)
- Joy (foreign licensed Serbian edition, since April 2003, monthly)
- Bravo Girl (foreign licensed Serbian edition, since 2003, quarterly)
- Mobitech (since 2004, monthly)
- Bravo ScreenFun (foreign licensed Serbian edition, since April 2005)
- TV Novele (since 2005, monthly)
- Bravacasa (foreign licensed Serbian edition of the Italian interior design magazine, since 2006, monthly)
- Astro (since 2006, monthly)
- Lekovito bilje (since 2006, monthly)
- Hello! (foreign licensed Serbian edition of the Spanish celebrity gossip magazine ¡Hola!, since 2007, initially bi-weekly, from June 2008 weekly)
- Top zdravlje (since 2007, monthly)
- Moja kosa (foreign licensed Serbian edition of British mag YourHair, since 2007, monthly)
- Dobra hrana (since 2007, monthly)
- L'Officiel (foreign licensed Serbian edition of the French fashion magazine, since 2008, bi-monthly)
- Scandal! (tabloid active since May 2004, Color Press Group took it over in March 2009, weekly)
- Bravo Sport (foreign licensed Serbian edition, since 2009, monthly)
- Pošalji recept (since 2007, monthly)
- Intelligent Life (foreign licensed Serbian edition, since 2010)
- Shopping (foreign licensed Serbian edition, since 2010)

== Former publications ==
- FHM (foreign licensed Serbian edition of the British magazine, started 2007 as a monthly, then changed to quarterly in 2009 before being discontinued in October 2009)
- Beauty Expert (bi-monthly foreign licensed Serbian edition, started 2008, discontinued 2009)
- CKM (monthly foreign licensed Serbian edition of the Polish men's magazine, started 2003, discontinued January 2014)
