= Bravo (magazine) =

European teen magazine

- Ashley Tisdale on the cover
- Editor-in-Chief: Alex Germandt
- Categories: Teenage
- Frequency: Weekly (1956-2015); Biweekly (2015-2020); Monthly (2020-present)
- Publisher: Pabel Moewig
- Total circulation: 45,282 (Q1 2022)
- Founder: Peter Boenisch
- Founded: 26 August 1956; 70 years ago
- Company: Heinrich Bauer Zeitschriften Verlag KG
- Country: Germany, Poland, Czechoslovakia (after 1992 Czech Republic and Slovakia), Portugal, Serbia, Slovenia, Romania, Hungary, Bulgaria, Russia
- Based in: Hamburg
- Language: German, Czech, Portuguese, Serbian, Slovenian, Polish, Romanian, Hungarian, Bulgarian, Russian
- Website: bravo.de
- ISSN: 0406-9595

Bravo (stylized in all caps) is the largest teen magazine within the German-language sphere. The first issue was published in 1956.

== History ==
The founder of Bravo was columnist Peter Boenisch. The first issue was published on 26 August 1956 with thirty thousand copies printed, cost 50 Pfennig (equivalent to €0.67 in 2021). Marilyn Monroe's portrait graced the first published issue; the never-published dummy issue cover displayed Elvis Presley.

The publication was initially subtitled "The Magazine for Film and Television" ("Die Zeitschrift für Film und Fernsehen"). Issue number 13/57 was released on 31 March 1957 with the new subtitle "The magazine with the young heart" ("Die Zeitschrift mit dem jungen Herzen") as well as "film, television, pop music" ("Film, Fernsehen, Schlager") which disappeared soon afterwards. Starting from issue 34/57 (13 August 1957) the magazine no longer had any subtitles underscoring its newfound focus.

In 1968 Bravo began to be published weekly by Pabel Moewig, a subsidiary of Bauer Verlagsgruppe in Hamburg; the editorial office however remained in Munich.

In the 1970s the magazine sold more than one million copies. By 1996 each issue still sold around 1.4 million issues. Bravo had a circulation of 825,800 copies in 1999. Afterwards the circulation fell steeply. In 2006 the magazine sold around 460,379 copies. In 2010 the circulation of the magazine was 512,358 copies, making it the best-selling teenage magazine in Europe.

In February 2017, Bravo stopped publishing in Spain with issue 552. However, editions are still published in some other countries.

American pop singer Britney Spears, who was a teen phenomenon in the late 1990s and early 2000s, holds the record for most appearances on the cover (56).

== Focus group and classic columns ==
Bravo covers topics which primarily interest young people, among which are current information on pop and movie stars, as well as relationship and sex counseling.

Under the pseudonyms "Dr. Christoph Vollmer" and "Dr. Kirsten Lindstroem" the then-47-year-old author of romance novels Marie Louise Fischer gave advice on relationships (Knigge für Verliebte, Liebe ohne Geheimnis) from 1964 to 1969. Martin Goldstein started to contribute to the magazine on 20 October 1969. A practising doctor, psychotherapist, and religion teacher, he took over and replied to readers' questions under the pseudonym "Dr. Jochen Sommer". Goldstein had made a name for himself in sex education with the publications Anders als bei Schmetterlingen and Lexikon der Aufklärung. Later, he answered questions about sex as "Dr. Korff", while "Dr. Sommer" concentrated on psychological questions.

From the early 1970s on, a whole group replied to questions. The editors put value in the fact that the "Dr.-Sommer-Team" continued to be made up of experts. At its peak Bravo received around 3000 to 5000 letters on puberty and sexuality per week. In 2006, 400 letters were still received.

Bravo made noticeably strong use of Anglicism and "Denglisch" starting in the 1980s.

Bravo was – primarily in the 1970s and 1980s – formative for generations of German youths and teenagers, which resulted in the paper's nickname of "Pickel-Prawda" (pimple-Pravda). The magazine was sometimes confiscated in schools by teachers. Many of today's adults received their sexual education in part from the articles by the Dr. Sommer team. Within the former GDR (East Germany) the magazine was forbidden, but still very popular and traded for high prices. Bravo played an influential part in promoting pop groups and artists in Germany.

In addition to the idea of the Dr. Sommer-team, Bravo invented the so-called Bravo-Starschnitt (star cut), a puzzle of a life-sized poster of a celebrity. Every new issue provided one cutout piece. The first Starschnitt-feature began in 1959 and was a poster of Brigitte Bardot.

== Controversies ==
=== Sexual content ===
In 1972, two issues with articles on masturbation were 'indexed' (prohibited for sale to under-age customers) by the Federal Department for Media Harmful to Young Persons because they were deemed youth-endangering.

=== Former depictions of teenage nudity ===
The magazine was controversial internationally for its section Dr. Sommer's That's Me!, which often featured sex interviews and full frontal nude photos of teen models aged between 14 and 20, which was later changed to 16 to 20 in the early 2000s. While this was legal in Germany, it caused problems with international child pornography laws. The magazine often worked around the laws by having the models hold the camera's shutter button themselves, thereby showing explicit consent. One former model told interviewers that he did not know his nude image was going to be sold by the photographer to Bravo for publication in That's Me!

From the early 2010s onwards, the magazine would rename the feature to Dr. Sommer's Bodycheck and feature those only aged between 18 and 25.

== Present ==
Originally there was only a single Bravo magazine, today different variants are published. This is a result of higher individualisation and changing interests. The following brands are part of the "Bravo Family":

- Bravo.de (Internet portal for teenagers independent of the magazine)
- Bravo Girl (targeting girls, from 1988 to 2023)
- Bravo Screenfun (for video games and consoles, from 1997 to 2009)
- Bravo Sport (sport magazine, since 1994)
- Bravo Sport TV (sport TV show)
- Bravo TV (youth television magazine)
- Bravo Hits (regularly published music compilation album)
- Bravo Hip Hop Special (published six times a year, focusing on hip hop, rap, and R&B, from 2005 to 2012)

Teenage magazines like Bravo are of high importance for the music industry as an advertising medium. Ads can be found in all Bravo formats.

A TV version of Bravo called Bravo TV started airing on 16 May 1993, first on RTL 2 and later on ZDF. The first presenter was Kristiane Backer, followed by Heike Makatsch. After a long hiatus Bravo TV returned on 5 November 2005 on ProSieben.

The magazine distributes its "Bravo Otto" (a small Indian-styled figure) award in different categories. The design of the figure is inspired by Winnetou, played by Pierre Brice, who had a longstanding connection within his cinematic role to Bravo. Among the prized artists were pop super stars ABBA, Inge Meysel, Pierre Brice (Winnetou), Joachim Fuchsberger, Stefan Raab, Whitney Houston, Madonna, Cher, David Hasselhoff, Mariah Carey, Boris Becker, Bro'Sis, Heike Makatsch, Horst Janson and many more. Furthermore, each week the readers vote in the Bravo charts, which sometimes oppose the sales charts and are an indicator of artists popularity in the past and today.

In 2006, Bravo released an anthology providing an overview of Bravo's perception of the world within the past 50 years.

== Price ==
- Germany: €3.20
- Austria: €3.60
- Switzerland & Liechtenstein: CHF 6.30
- Belgium & Luxembourg: €3.80
- Estonia: €4.20
- Netherlands: €3.90
- Denmark: kr. 39.95
- Czech Republic: Kč 155
- Malta: €4.90
- Slovenia: €4.40
- Greece: €4.50
- Italy & San Marino: €4.30
- Spain, Andorra & Portugal: €4.40

== Logos ==
From August 1956, there are two different logos for this magazine. The first logo was in use from 1956 to 1965, the second and current logo was in use from 1965.
