= Persecution of Croats in Serbia during the Yugoslav Wars =

Effect of Yugoslav Wars on Croats of Serbia

- Part of the Yugoslav Wars
- Location: Hrtkovci and other places in Srem, Vojvodina, SR Serbia, FR Yugoslavia (modern-day Serbia)
- Date: 1991-1999
- Target: Croats
- Attack type: Deportations, Murder
- Deaths: 17
- Victims: 20,000-50,000 Croats deported
- Perpetrator: Serbian Radical Party
- Convicted: Vojislav Šešelj

During the Yugoslav Wars, members of the Serbian Radical Party conducted a campaign of intimidation and persecution against the Croats of Serbia through hate speech. These acts forced a part of the local Croat population to leave the area in 1992. Most of them were resettled in Croatia. The affected locations included Hrtkovci and a number of other places in Srem.

According to some estimates, around 10,000 Croats left Vojvodina under political pressure in three months of 1992, and a total of 20,000 fled by the end of the year. Between 20,000 and 25,000 to 30,000 according to Human Rights NGOs to 50,000 Croats fled Vojvodina in the 1990s in total. Another 6,000 left Kosovo and 5,000 Serbia Proper, including Belgrade.

The U.N.-backed International Criminal Tribunal for the former Yugoslavia (ICTY) later indicted Vojislav Šešelj for the specific case of the deportation of Croats from Hrtkovci. He was sentenced to 10 years in prison for persecution on political, racial or religious grounds, deportation and forced transfer as a crime against humanity, making it the only conviction of the Tribunal in relation to Yugoslav Wars on the territory of Vojvodina.

== Description ==
Vojvodina is a province of Serbia. According to the 1991 census, its population was 2,012,517. Serbs comprised 57.2%, Hungarians 16.9% of its population, or 1,151,353 and 430,946 members, respectively. Croats numbered 74,226 members or 3.7% of Vojvodina's population (down from 109,203 from the 1981 census), and 105,406 members in Serbia as a whole.

=== Hrtkovci incident ===
Hrtkovci on the map of Vojvodina, Serbia

Following the Dissolution of Yugoslavia and Yugoslav Wars, the Serb-Croat relations deteriorated. In 1991, Hrtkovci was an ethnically mixed village with Croatian plurality (40.2%), located roughly 40 miles west of Belgrade. Vojislav Šešelj, the leader of the Serbian Radical Party, made numerous public threats to Croats in Hrtkovci in May 1992. On 1 and 7 April 1992, Šešelj called for the expulsion of Croats from Serbia at the Serbian Parliament. Radicals replaced all Latin signs with Cyrillic ones and even renamed Hrtkovci to "Srbislavci" – 'place of Serbs' – though only for a short amount of time. Šešelj personally visited Hrtkovci on 6 May 1992 and gave a hate speech in front of a rally of Serb nationalists by publicly reading out a list of 17 Croat "traitors" who must leave the village. In the speech, Šešelj said:

In this village, too, in Hrtkovci, in this place in Serbian Srem, there is no room for Croats... Including those from here, from Hrtkovci, who locked up their houses and left, reckoning, I suppose, that they would come back one day, but our message to them is: no, you have nowhere to return to. Serbian refugees will move into their houses...I firmly believe that you, Serbs from Hrtkovci and other villages around here, will also know how to preserve your harmony and unity, that you will promptly get rid of the remaining Croats in your village and the surrounding villages.

Following the threats, one part of local Croats rushed to Croatia to see the houses which were offered to them in the planned population transfer. Incoming Serb refugees labeled Croats as "fascists". One Croat was even murdered by the radicals. Šešelj's party even crafted a slogan for their campaign: "All Croats out of Hrtkovci". In 1991, Hrtkovci had 2,684 residents, including 1,080 Croats (40.2%), 555 Serbs and Montenegrins (20.7%), 515 Hungarians (19.2%), and 445 Yugoslavs (16.6%). By the end of 1992, 75% of its residents were Serbs.

The number of Croats who left from the village of Hrtkovci was between 722 and 1,200. Their empty homes were settled by Serb refugees from Croatia and Bosnia. Likewise, some Serbs tried to protect their Croatian neighbors. After the events, Yugoslav authorities arrested five radicals who were responsible for harassment of Croats.

=== Elsewhere in Srem ===
Affected places on the map of Vojvodina, Serbia

The affected locations included Hrtkovci, Nikinci, Novi Slankamen, Ruma, Šid, and other places bordering Croatia.

In its 1993 report, published during its 49th session, the United Nations Commission on Human Rights wrote that Hungarians and Croats in Vojvodina were subjected to "verbal and physical threats and other acts of intimidation, including setting houses on fire and destroying cultural and religious monuments", and thus left their homes in large numbers after Vojvodina lost its autonomy. Another reason for their departure was that many were refusing to be drafted in the Yugoslav army, fearing they might be sent to the battle front. Besides Hrtkovci, the report documented an exodus of Croats from Kukujevci and Novi Slankamen, as a result of threats and the bombing of their houses. The villages of Beška and Golubinci were said to have lost their entire respective Croat population. Other means of intimidation included threatening telephone calls and letters. The report alleged that "the police have acquiesced in some of the incidents which have been attributed to individuals." On 23 February 1993, the Commission adopted a resolution expressing its "grave concern" at the "violations of human rights occurring in Sandžak and Vojvodina, particularly acts of physical harassment, abductions, the burning of homes, warrantless searches, confiscation of property and other practices intended to change the ethnic structure in favour of the Serbian population."

On 29 August 1992, the BBC reported bombings of Croatian homes in the village of Nikinci. In Golubinci, twenty cases were recorded where bombs were planted inside Croat houses. A 28-year old Croat woman was killed in her home on 7 February 1994. The Serbian Humanitarian Law Centre, based in Belgrade, has documented at least 17 instances of killings or disappearances of Croats from Vojvodina from 1991-1995. In many instances, entire Croat families were abducted and murdered. On the 20 April 1992, the Matijević family, consisting of Ana and Jozo Matijević and their underage son, Franjo, were kidnapped by unknown Serb militiamen from the village of Kukujevci. From there, they were taken to Mohovo, then occupied by Croatian Serb forces, where the family was then murdered and buried in the village cemetery. In July 1993, another Croat family from Kukujevci, consisting of Nikola and Agica Oksomić and 87-year-old Marija Tomić, Agica's mother, were murdered by two local Serb volunteers fighting for Croatian Serb forces in Croatia.

=== Demographic consequences ===
According to different sources, between 20,000 and 25,000 Croats left Vojvodina in the 1990s. Some sources even place the number at up to 50,000.

Another 6,000 Croats left Kosovo and 5,000 Serbia Proper, including Belgrade.

== Legal prosecution ==
In 2003, Vojislav Šešelj was indicted by the U.N. established International Criminal Tribunal for the former Yugoslavia (ICTY). On 11 April 2018, the Appeals Chamber of the follow-up International Residual Mechanism for Criminal Tribunals (IRMCT) sentenced him to 10 years in prison under Counts 1, 10, and 11 of the indictment for instigating deportation, persecution on political, racial or religious ground (forcible displacement), and other inhumane acts (forcible transfer) as crimes against humanity due to his speech in Hrtkovci on 6 May 1992, in which he called for the expulsion of Croats from Vojvodina. The verdict was compared with similar hate speech propaganda judgements, such as the ICTY case of Radoslav Brđanin, and the International Criminal Tribunal for Rwanda case of Jean-Paul Akayesu, where it was ruled that instigation is punishable when the speech is followed by subsequent criminal conduct. The Appeals Chamber concluded the following:

...many non-Serbian civilians left Hrtkovci by way of housing exchanges with Serbian refugees in the context of coercion, harassment, and intimidation... In addition, given that the acts of violence and intimidation were aimed at non-Serbian civilians, particularly Croatians, the only reasonable inference is that the acts of forcible displacement amounted to discrimination in fact, were carried out with discriminatory intent on ethnic grounds, and constituted part of a widespread or systematic attack against the non-Serbian civilian population, encompassing also areas in Croatia and Bosnia and Herzegovina.

== See also ==
- Croatia–Serbia genocide case
- Serbia in the Yugoslav Wars
- Category:Serbian war crimes in the Croatian War of Independence
- Stajićevo camp
- Vukovar children massacre hoax
