= Zoran Slavujević =

Serbian politician

Zoran Slavujević (Serbian Cyrillic: Зоран Славујевић; born 19 March 1966) is a doctor, politician, and administrator in Serbia. He briefly served in the Assembly of Vojvodina in 2016 as a member of the Serbian Progressive Party. Since that time, he has overseen the gerontological center Srem.

== Private career ==
Slavujević is an orthopedic surgeon. He lives in Hrtkovci in the municipality of Ruma.

== Politician ==
=== Municipal politics ===
Slavujević was elected to the Ruma municipal assembly as a member of the Democratic Party (Demokratska stranka, DS) in the 2008 and 2012 Serbian local elections. He subsequently left the DS and, in late 2013, joined the Progressive Party. He did not seek re-election at the local level in 2016.

=== Provincial politics ===
Slavujević was given the twenty-fourth position on the Progressive Party's electoral list in the 2016 Vojvodina provincial election and was elected the provincial assembly when the list won a majority victory with sixty-three out of 120 mandates. He resigned from the assembly on 15 December 2016, shortly after being appointed director of Srem.

== Administrator ==
Slavujević was appointed as acting director of the state gerontological center Srem in Ruma on 7 December 2016. He continues to hold this role as of 2021 and has overseen the organization's response to the COVID-19 pandemic.
