= Novi Slankamen =

Novi Slankamen Нови Сланкамен (Serbian)
- Village (Selo)
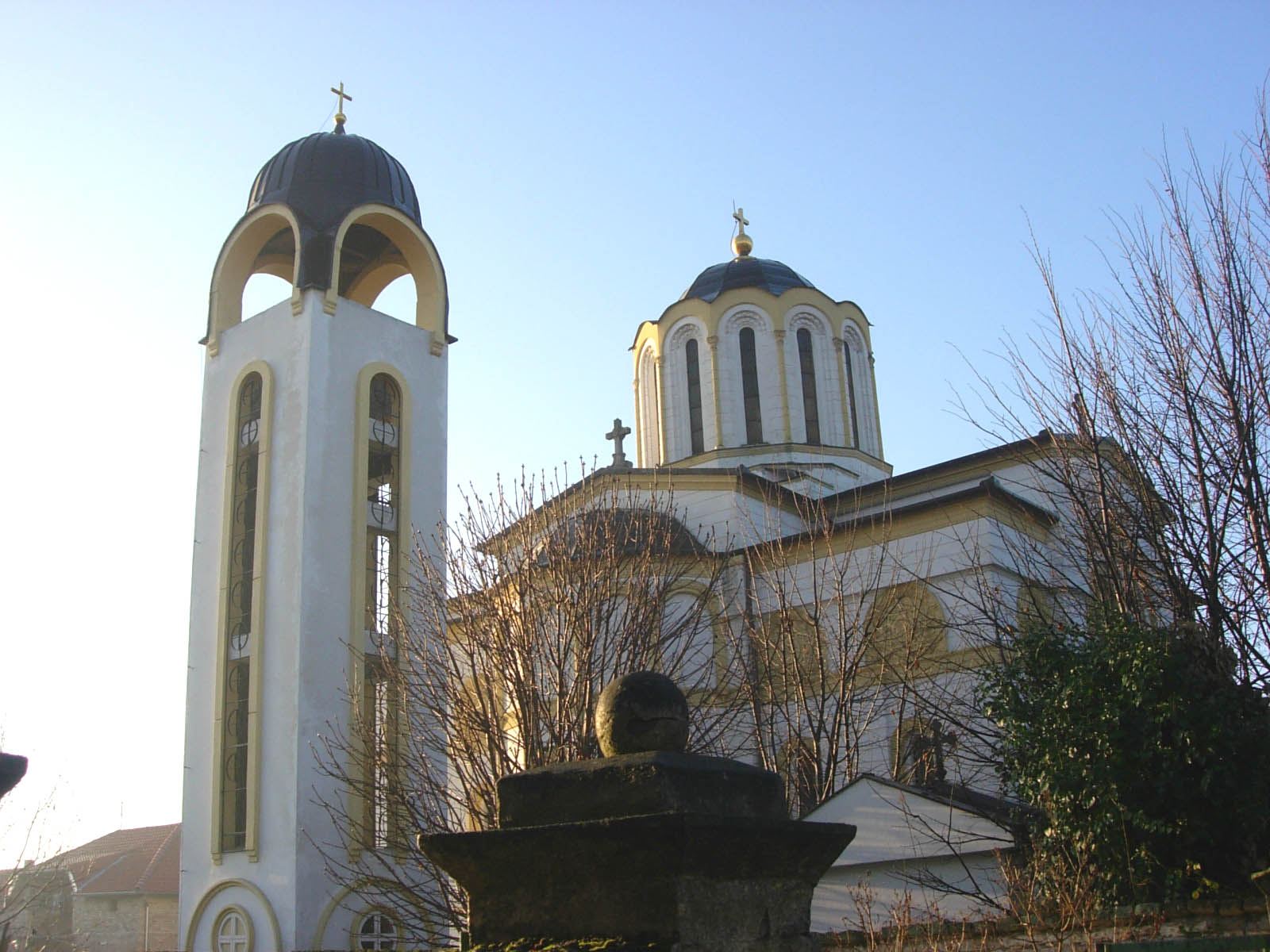
- The Orthodox church.

- Location within Vojvodina Location within Serbia Location within Europe
- Coordinates: 45°08′N 20°14′E
- Country: Serbia
- Province: Vojvodina
- District: Srem
- Municipality: Inđija
- Time zone: UTC+1 (CET)
  - Summer (DST): UTC+2 (CEST)

Novi Slankamen (Serbian Cyrillic: Нови Сланкамен) is a village in Serbia. It is located in the municipality of Inđija, Syrmia District, Autonomous Province of Vojvodina. Novi Slankamen is situated about 15 kilometers east of Inđija, on the bank of the Danube (Dunav) and has a total population of 3,421 (2002 census).

== Name ==
In Serbian and Croatian the village is known as Novi Slankamen (Нови Сланкамен) and in Hungarian as Újszalánkemén.

Its name means "New Slankamen", while the name of the neighbouring village, Stari Slankamen, means "Old Slankamen". The name "Slankamen" itself means "the salty stone".

== Geography ==
- Latitude: 45.1253,
- Longitude: 20.2394,
- Altitude - feet 459 Lat (DMS) 45° 7' 31N Long (DMS) 20° 14' 22E Altitude (meters) 139
- Time zone (est) UTC+1(+2DT)
- Approximate population for 7 km radius from this point: 10,059

== Ethnic groups ==
The population of the village consists of Serbs (79.73%), Croats (15.74%), Romani, Hungarians, Slovaks, and Germans.

== History ==
Before the early 1990s and the migrations caused by the Yugoslav Wars, the population of Novi Slankamen consisted of Croats (66%), Serbs (31%), and other groups.

During the Yugoslav Wars, most Croats left Novi Slankamen and other settlements in the Serbian part of Syrmia. They moved to Croatia, Western Europe, North America, and Australia, while Serb refugees from Croatia, Bosnia and Herzegovina, and Kosovo settled in said places.

== Historical population ==
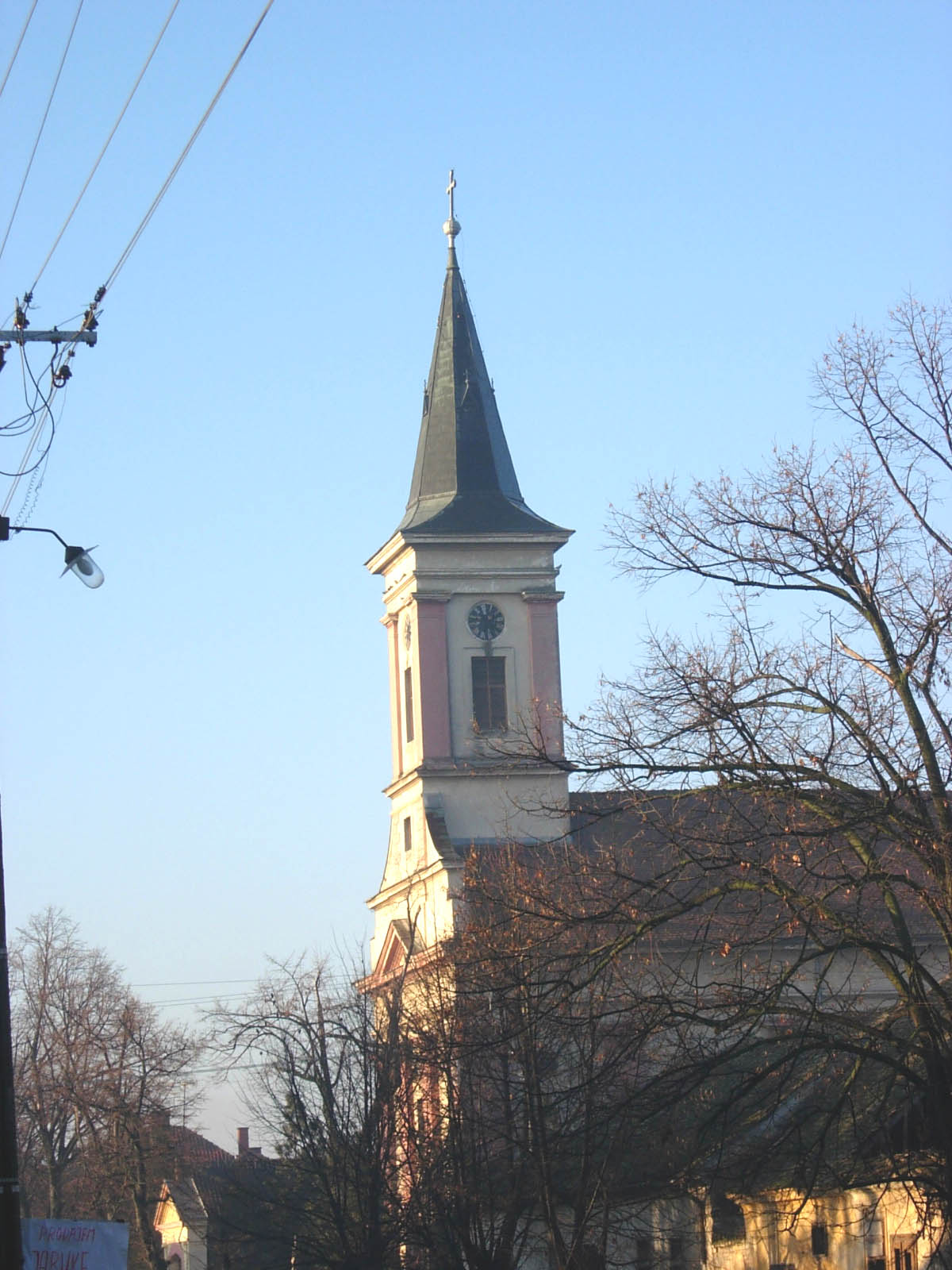
The Catholic church.

- 1961: 4,372
- 1971: 4,005
- 1981: 3,210
- 1991: 2,977

== Economy ==
The local economy is based primarily on cultivation of orchards and vineyards.

== See also ==
- List of places in Serbia
- List of cities, towns and villages in Vojvodina
