= Lepota & Zdravlje =

- May 2010 cover of Lepota & Zdravlje
- Editor-in-Chief: Lidija Ćulibrk
- Categories: Women's magazine
- Frequency: Monthly
- Total circulation: 75,000
- Founded: 2001
- Company: Color Press Group
- Country: Serbia (other countries also available)
- Language: Serbian (other languages also available)
- Website: lepotaizdravlje.rs/

Lepota & Zdravlje (Beauty & Health) is a monthly women's glossy magazine, started in February 2001, by Color Press Group, a Serbian media company. The articles in the magazine are about beauty, style, fashion, sex, relationships, celebrities etc. Besides Serbian, Lepota & Zdravlje has five international editions (for other countries of former Yugoslavia): Bosnia & Herzegovina (from February 2008), Croatia (from September 2008), Macedonia (from June 2008), Montenegro (from May 2009) and Slovenia (from November 2007, branded simply as L&Z).

== History ==
From October 2019, Lepota & Zdravlje was redesigned with a collaboration with American magazines Shape and Health for Serbian, Croatian, Bosnian, Slovenian and Montenegrin editions.

== See also ==
Color Press Group
