= Croats of Serbia =

Хрвати у Србији Hrvati u Srbiji
- Ethnic flag of Croats of Serbia

Total population
- 39,107 (2022)

Regions with significant populations
- Vojvodina: 32,684
- Belgrade: 4,554

Languages
- Serbian and Croatian

Religion
- Catholicism

Related ethnic groups
- Bunjevci, South Slavs

Croats are a recognized ethnic minority in Serbia. According to data from the 2022 census, the population of ethnic Croats in Serbia is 39,107, constituting 0.6% of the total population.

The majority of them live in Vojvodina, where they number 32,684 and make up 1.9% of the province's population. An additional 11,104 people declared themselves as Bunjevci in the 2022 census; there are differing views whether Bunjevci should be regarded as Croats or as distinct ethnicity.

== History ==
During the 15th century, Croats mostly lived in the Syrmia region. It is estimated that Croats were a majority in 76 out of 801 villages that existed in the present-day territory of Vojvodina.

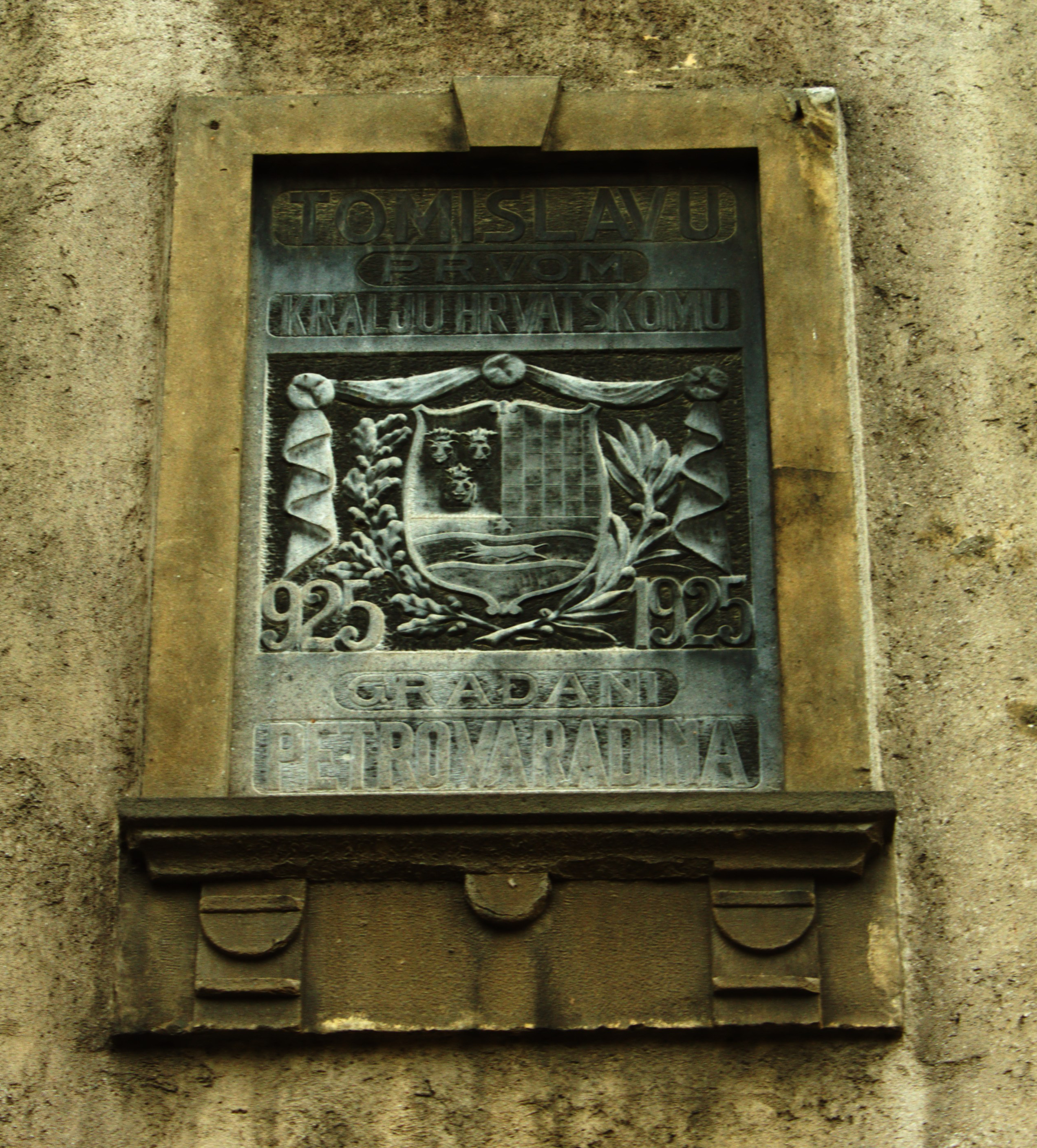
1925 commemorative plaque in Petrovaradin, suburb of Novi Sad: "To Tomislav, the first Croatian king. Citizens of Petrovaradin."

According to 1851 data, it is estimated that the population of the Voivodeship of Serbia and Banat of Temeschwar, the historical province that was predecessor of present-day Vojvodina, included, among other ethnic groups, 62,936 Bunjevci and Šokci as well as 2,860 Croats. Subsequent statistical estimations from the second half of the 19th century counted Bunjevci and Šokci as "others" and presented them separately from Croats.

The 1910 Austro-Hungarian census also showed large differences in the numbers of those who, according to the mother tongue, considered themselves Bunjevci and Šokci, and those who considered themselves Croats. According to the census, some 70,000 Bunjevci were categorized as "others". In Subotica there were only 39 people who declared Croatian as their native language, while 33,390 were listed as speakers of "other languages" (most of them declared Bunjevac as their native language). In Sombor, 83 people declared Croatian language, while 6,289 were listed as speakers of "other languages" (mostly Bunjevac). In Apatin, 44 people declared Croatian and 7,191 declared "other languages" (mostly Bunjevac, Šokac, and Romani). In Syrmia, Croats were a relative or absolute majority in Gibarac (843 Croats or 86.4% of total population), Kukujevci (1,775 or 77.6%), Novi Slankamen (2,450 or 59.2%), Petrovaradin (3,266 or 57%), Stari Slankamen (466 or 48.2%), Hrtkovci (1,144 or 45.4% ), and Morović (966 or 41.67%). Other places which had a significant percentage of Croats included Novi Banovci (37.7%), Golubinci (36.8%), Sremska Kamenica (36.4%), Sot (33%), Sremska Mitrovica (30.3%), Sremski Karlovci (29.9%), and Ljuba (29.8%).

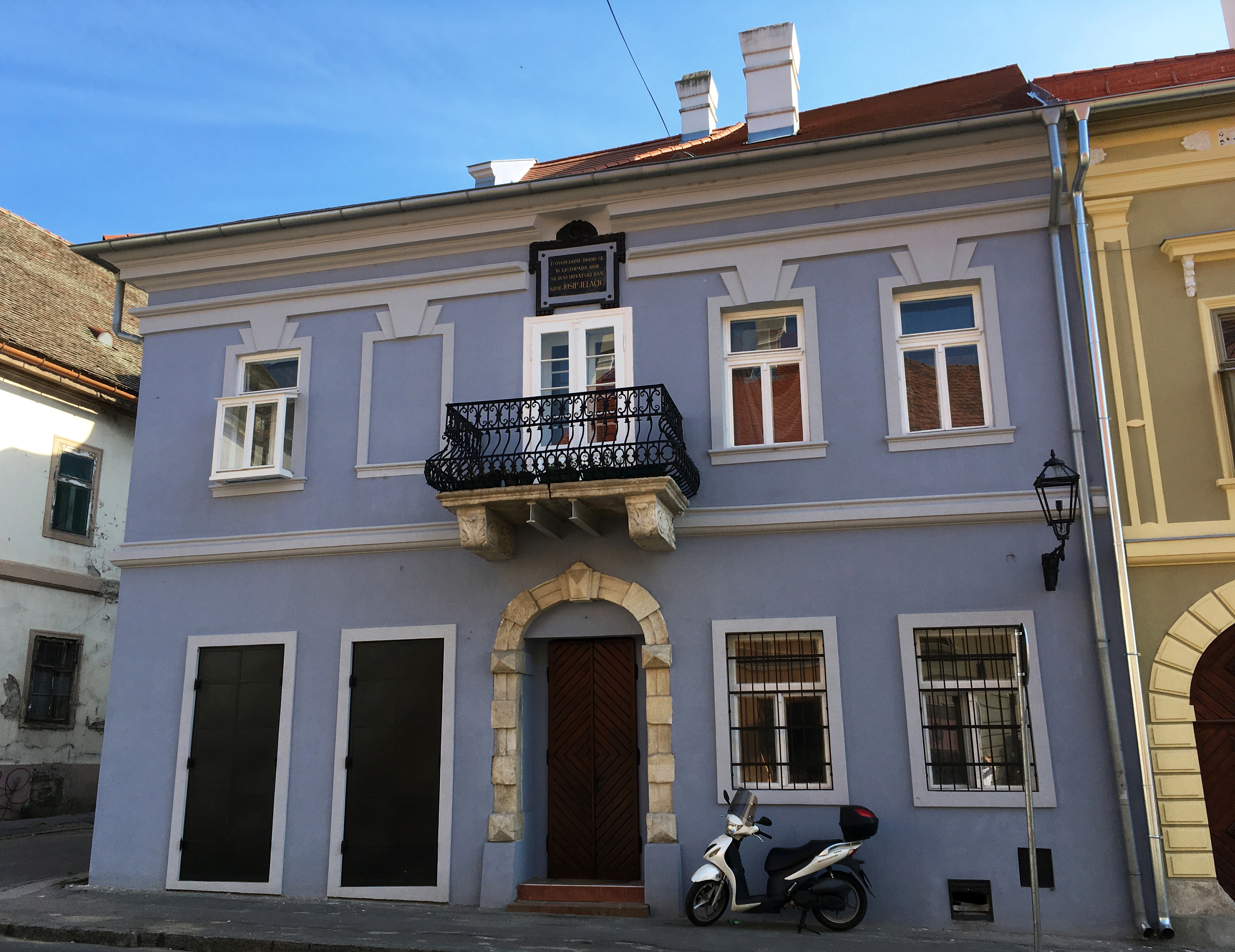
The birth house of ban Josip Jelačić, bought from private owners by the Serbian state and given as a gift to the Croatian minority

In 1925, Bunjevac-Šokac Party and "Pučka kasina" organized in Subotica the 1000th-anniversary celebration of the establishment of Kingdom of Croatia, in memory of coronation of Tomislav of Croatia as the first king of the Kingdom of Croatia: on the King Tomislav Square a memorial plaque was unveiled with the inscription "The memorial plaque of millennium of Croatian Kingdom 925-1925. Set by Bunjevci Croats".

In the 1990s, during the war in Croatia, persecution of ethnic Croats in some places in Vojvodina was organized by members of the Serbian Radical Party. The party's president, Vojislav Šešelj, was indicted in 2002 before International Criminal Tribunal for the former Yugoslavia for participation in these events.

In that time, some form of transfer of population occurred between ethnic Croats from Serbia and ethnic Serbs from Croatia. During the summer of 1992, more than 10,000 Croats from Serbia exchanged their property for the property of Serbs from Croatia, and altogether about 20,000 Croats left Serbia. According to other estimations, the number of Croats who have left Serbia might be between 20,000 and 40,000, or even 50,000.

In 2020, the 18th-century birth home of ban Josip Jelačić in Petrovaradin, was bought by the Serbian state only to be given as a gift to the Croat National Council.

== Demographics ==
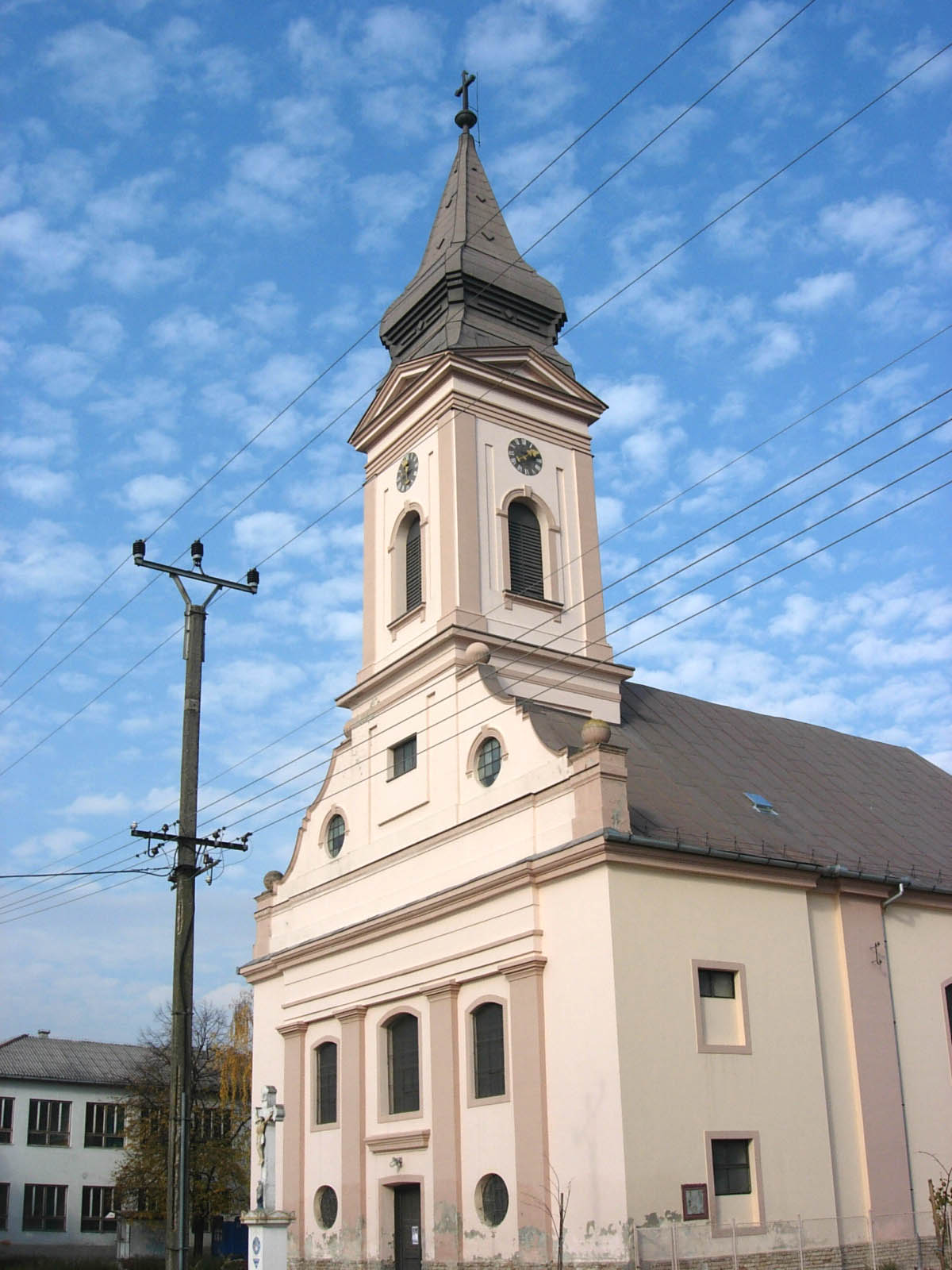
Saint Lawrence the Martyr Catholic Church, Sonta

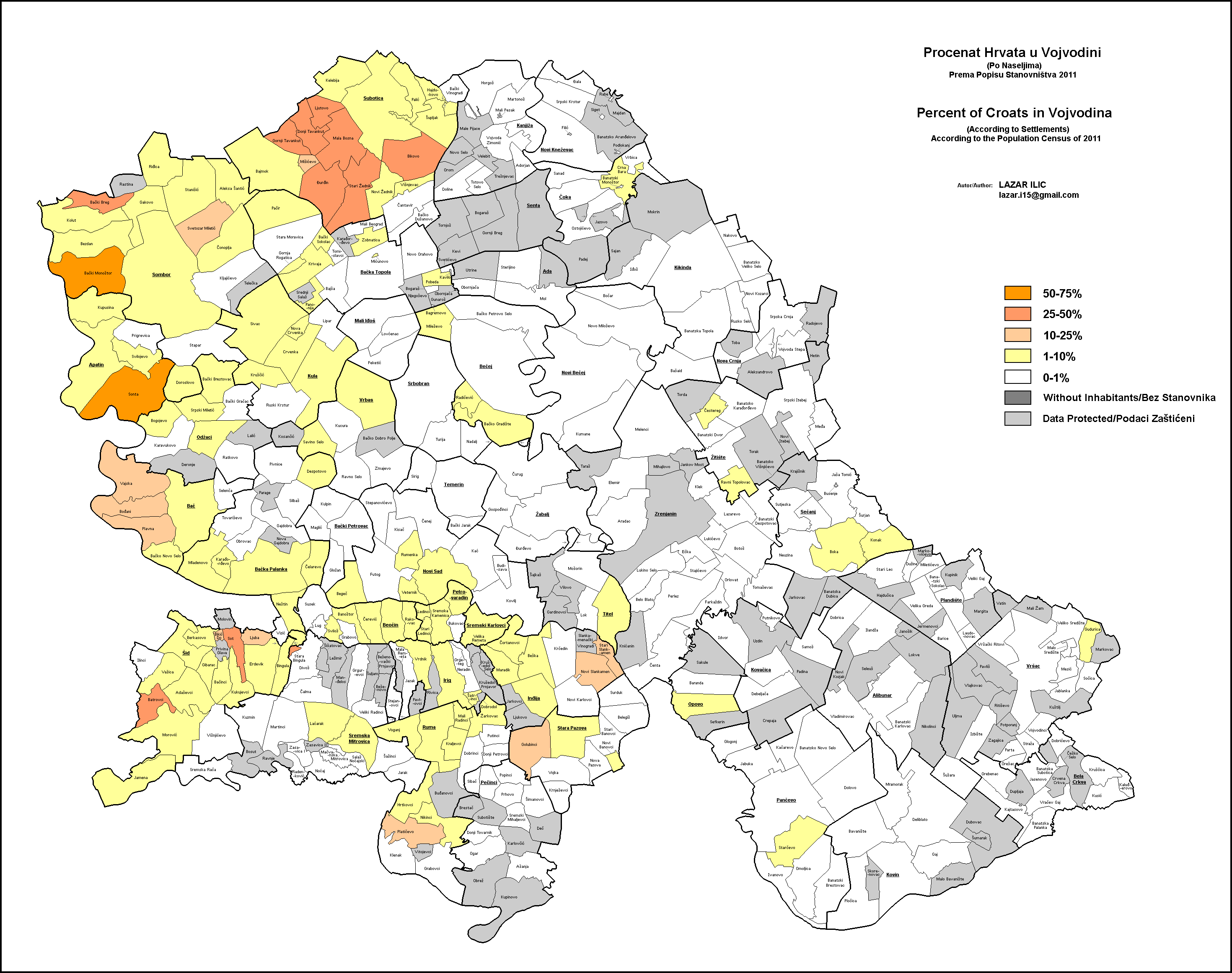
Settlements in Vojvodina with share of ethnic Croats, 2011

The largest concentration of ethnic Croats in Serbia are to be found in Vojvodina, numbering 32,684 or 1.9% of the provincial population. A further 4,454 Croats lived in the national capital Belgrade, with the remaining 1,869 in the rest of the country.

Croats form ethnic majority in two villages Bački Monoštor (52.3% of population) and Bački Breg (52.1%), both in the administrative area of the city of Sombor. They form relative ethnic majorities in the village of Sonta (47.2%) in the municipality of Apatin, as well as in the following villages of administrative city of Subotica: Donji Tavankut (42.2%), Mala Bosna (39%), Đurđin (36.2%), Stari Žednik (31%), and Bikovo (24.5%).

The largest recorded number of Croats were 196,409 or 2.5% of the total population of Serbia at the time, recorded at the 1961 census, and included Bunjevci. Since then, the Croat population in Serbia is in a constant decline, caused by various reasons, ranging from economic emigration to ethnic tensions during the Yugoslav Wars as well as due to different census methodology.

Year	Population	Share
1948	169,894	2.6%
1953	162,158	2.3%
1961	196,411	2.6%
1971	184,913	2.2%
1981	149,368	1.6%
1991	105,406	1.1%
1991 (excl. Kosovo)	97,344	1.2%
2002 (excl. Kosovo)	70,602	0.9%
2011 (excl. Kosovo)	57,900	0.8%
2022 (excl. Kosovo)	39,107	0.6%

Ethnicity in Yugoslav and Serbian censuses has been based on self-declaration, but political policies influenced how Bunjevci were categorized, often grouping them with Croats before 1991 census or separating them since the 1991 census. The Yugoslavian censuses (1948, 1953, 1961, 1971, and 1981) allowed self-declaration of ethnicity, but specific policies targeted Bunjevci. A 1945 decree from the communist authorities mandated that Bunjevci be exclusively treated as Croats, with no recognition as distinct ethnic group. The 1991 census introduced separate modality for Bunjevci, allowing self-declaration as distinct ethnicity for the first time since 1945 with numbers tracked independently. This continued in Serbian censuses (2002, 2011, 2022), with ethnicity remaining self-declared but now including explicit option for Bunjevci. The change was criticized as a political tool to fragment the Croat ethnic minority in Serbia since this shift had direct implications for the reported numbers of Croats, as allowing separate declarations for Bunjevci reduced the count of individuals identifying as Croats. Proponents of a separate Bunjevac ethnicity argue that the number of Croats may have been smaller at that time, as the communist authorities counted in the people to as Croats, who self-declared as Bunjevci. Today, the Bunjevac community in Serbia is split between those who declare themselves as a distinct ethnic group with their own language and those who identify themselves as a Croatian sub-ethnic group.

The census figures are of relevance since the ethnic minorities' councils receive funds from the state and province to finance their own governing body, cultural, and educational organisations based on the size of each ethnic minortiy.

== Language ==
Croatian, considered by some linguists as a standard variety of the pluricentric language Serbo-Croatian, is one of the six official languages of provincial administration in Vojvodina.

=== Bunjevac dialect ===
Some members of the Bunjevac community, preserved a Neo-Shtokavian–Younger Ikavian dialect of the Serbo-Croatian pluricentric language, also known as Bunjevac dialect (bunjevački dijalekt) or Bunjevac speech (bunjevački govor). Their accent is purely Ikavian, with /i/ for the Common Slavic vowels yat. Croatia has categorized the Neo-Stokavian Younger Ikavian dialect to be the Bunjevac dialect with three sub-branches: Danubian (also known as Bunjevac), Littoral-Lika, and Dalmatian (also known as Bosnian–Dalmatian). Its speakers largely use the Latin alphabet and are living in parts of Bosnia and Herzegovina, parts of Croatia, southern parts of Hungary as well in northernmost parts of Serbia.

There have been three meritorious people who preserved the Bunjevac dialect in two separate dictionaries: Grgo Bačlija and Marko Peić with "Ričnik bački Bunjevaca" (editions 1990, 2018), and Ante Sekulić with "Rječnik govora bačkih Hrvata" (2005).

For decades, there has been an unresolved language issue within the Bunjevac community as well as between Serbia and Croatia over the status of the Bunjevac speech.

The dialect spoken by the Danubian Bunjevci living in Serbia, was standardised in 2018 and officially approved as a standard dialect by the Serbian Ministry of Education for teaching in schools. With the standardisation of the Bunjevac dialect, activists and members of the Bunjevac National Council are striving for language secession, with the political aim that the Bunjevac dialect will gain in Serbia the political-linguistic status of independent language. Theodora Vuković has provided, in 2009, the scientific methodology for the finalization of the standardisation process of the Bunjevac dialect corpus in Serbia, classified as the Serbian Bunjevac dialect variety of the Danubian branch of the Neo-Shtokavian Younger Ikavian dialect. Speakers use in general the standardised dialect variety for writing and conversation in formal situations.

In 2021, the Subotica city council added Bunjevac dialect to the list of languages in official use by the city administration, in addition to Serbian, Hungarian, and Croatian. This has created a special situation that contradicts the official position, of both the Serbian state and Matica srpska, that classified Bunjevac speech as a dialect.

Popularly, the Bunjevac dialect is sometimes referred to as "Bunjevac language" (bunjevački jezik) or Bunjevac mother tongue (materni jezik). At the political level, depending on goal and content of the political lobby, the general confusion concerning the definition of the terms language, dialect, speech, mother tongue, is cleverly exploited, resulting in an inconsistent use of the terms.

The Croatian Ministry of Culture, at the proposal of the Institute of Croatian Language and Linguistics, added in 2021 Bunjevac dialect to the List of Protected Intangible Cultural Heritage of Croatia.

== Politics ==
The Croat National Council is a representation body of the Croatian ethnic minority in Serbia, established for the protection of the rights and the minority self-government of Croats in Serbia. Flag and coat of arms of Croats of Serbia were adopted by the Croat National Council in 2005, with the coat of arms being the historical coat of arms of Croatia, a checkerboard consisting of 13 red and 12 white fields (the difference with the Croatian coat of arms being the crown on top).

The Democratic Alliance of Croats in Vojvodina is the ethnic minority party representing interests of Croats in Serbia.

== Organizations ==
- Institute for Culture of Croats of Vojvodina, ZKVH
- Bunjevac Croatian Cultural and Educational Society in Serbia
- HKPD "Matija Gubec" Tavankut
- Croatian Community in Belgrade "Tin Ujević"

== Celebrations ==
Dužijanca is the most famous folk celebration of Croats in Serbia, held in Subotica.

St. Joseph's Day is celebrated as the Community Day (Dan zajednice) of the Croats in Serbia, since 2006; it is regularly celebrated with holy masses in Subotica, Bački Monoštor, Sombor, Bač, Sonta, Novi Sad (Petrovaradin), Starčevo, Ruma, and Belgrade.

== Notable people ==
- Marijan Beneš – boxer
- Tamara Boroš – table tennis player
- Robert Čoban – journalist and media executive
- Stjepan Horvat – geodesist
- Josip Jelačić – Ban of Croatia
- Josip Leko – politician, the speaker of the Croatian Parliament
- Jovan Mikić – athlete
- Ilija Okrugić – poet and playwright
- Ratko Rudić – water polo player and coach
- Ivan Sarić – aviator
- Albe Vidaković – composer, musician
- Ivica Vrdoljak – football player
- Tomislav Žigmanov – politician, author, publisher

== See also ==
- Croatia–Serbia relations
- Croatian diaspora
- Serbs of Croatia
