= Nikinci =

Nikinci Никинци (Serbian)
- Village (Selo)
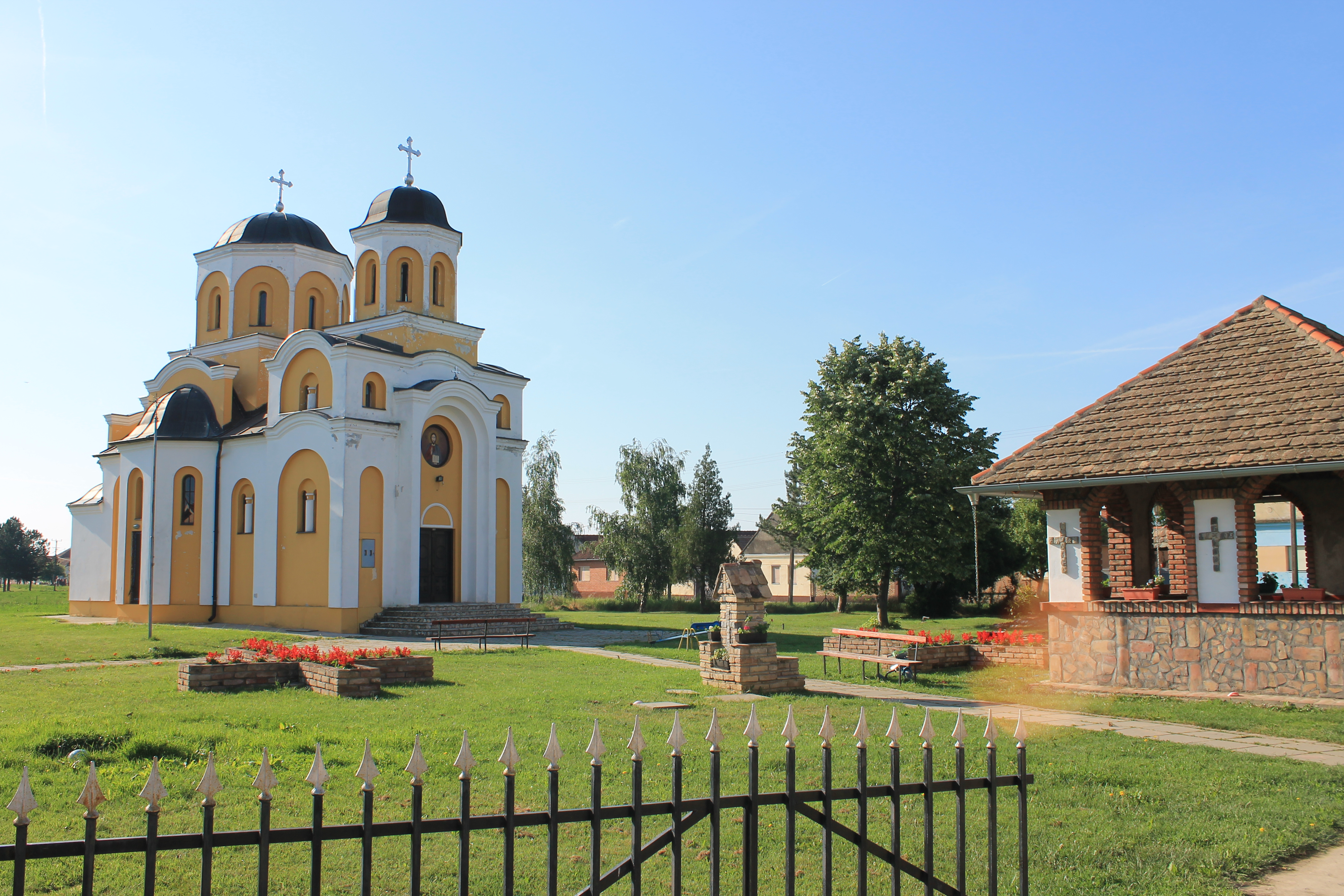
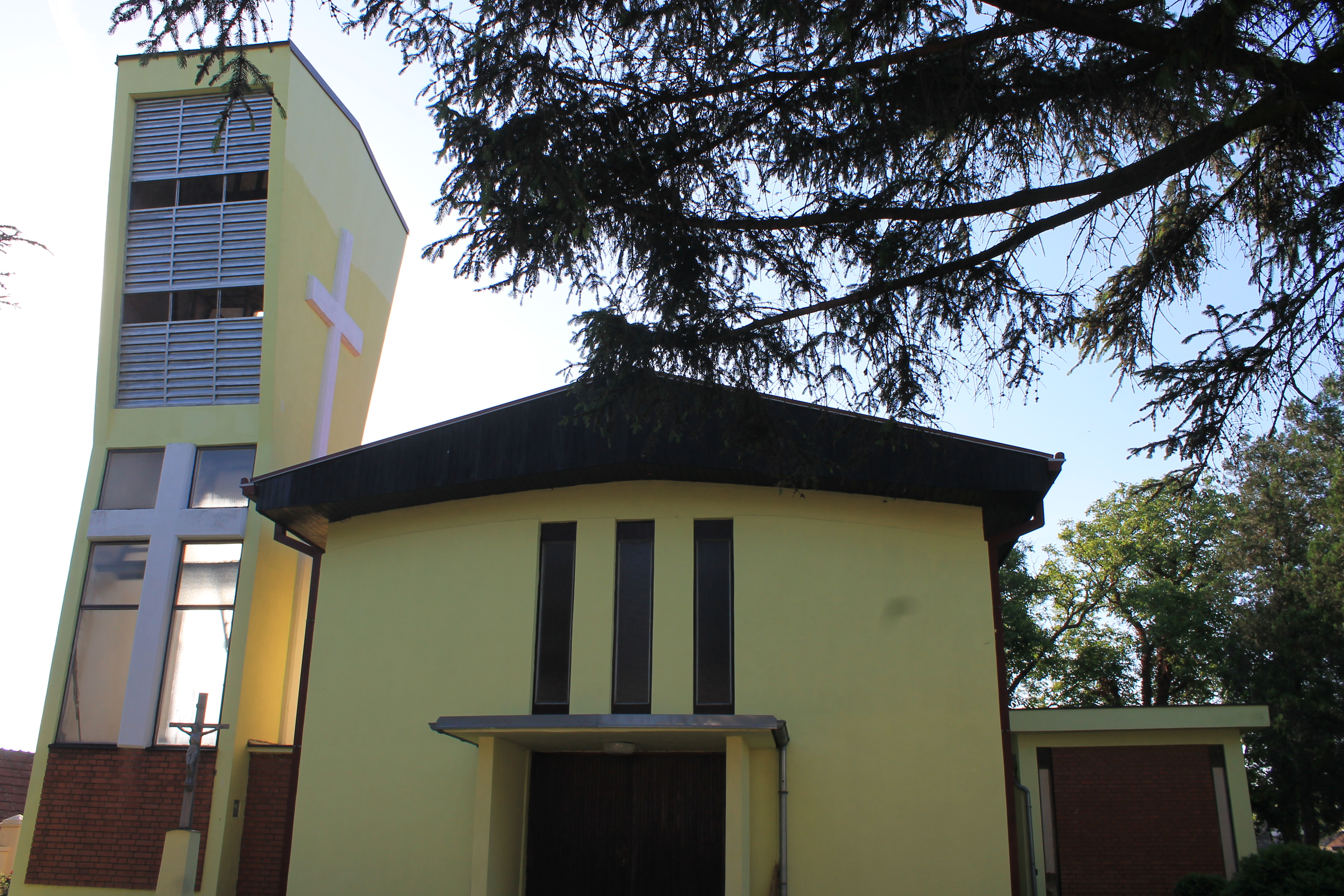
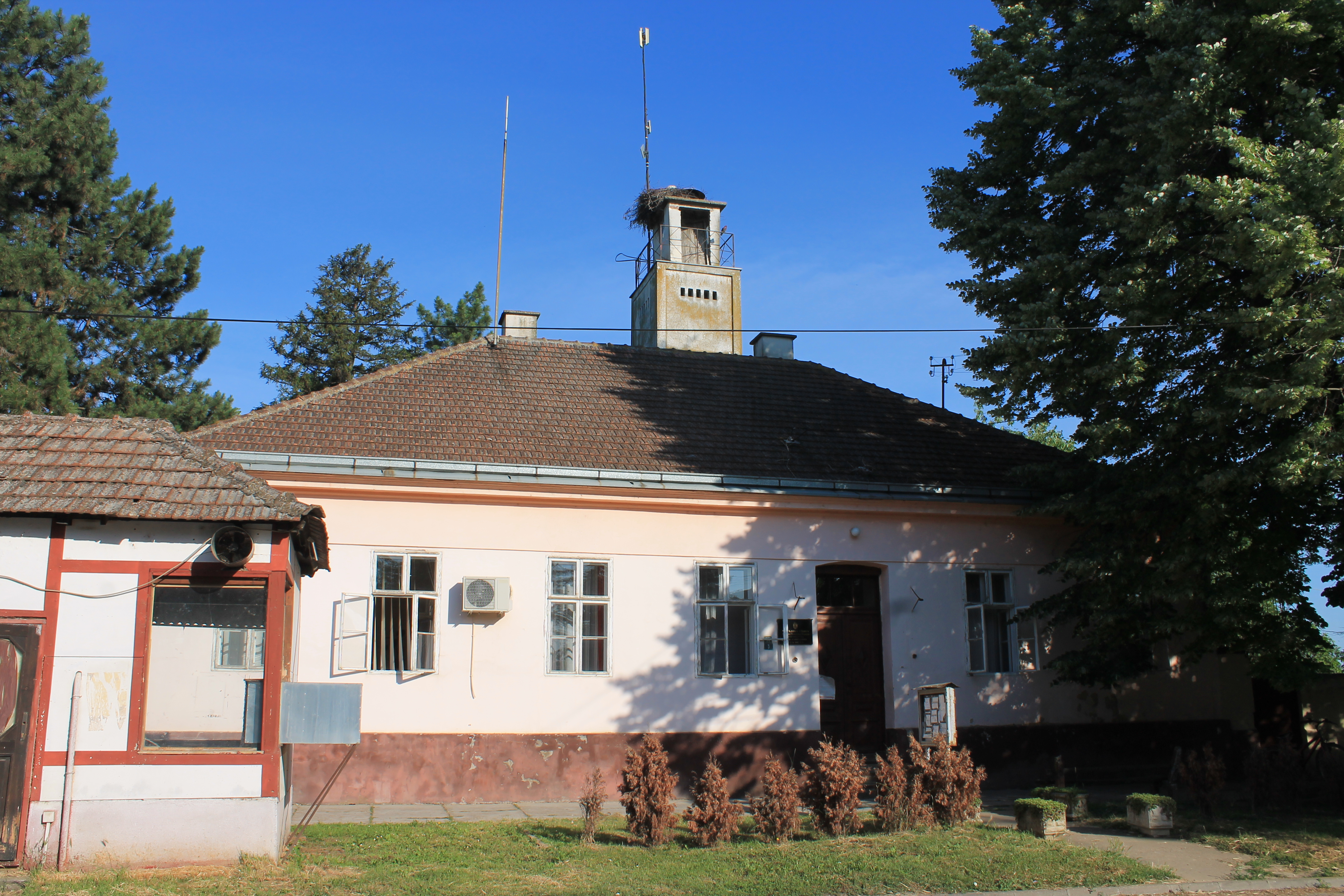
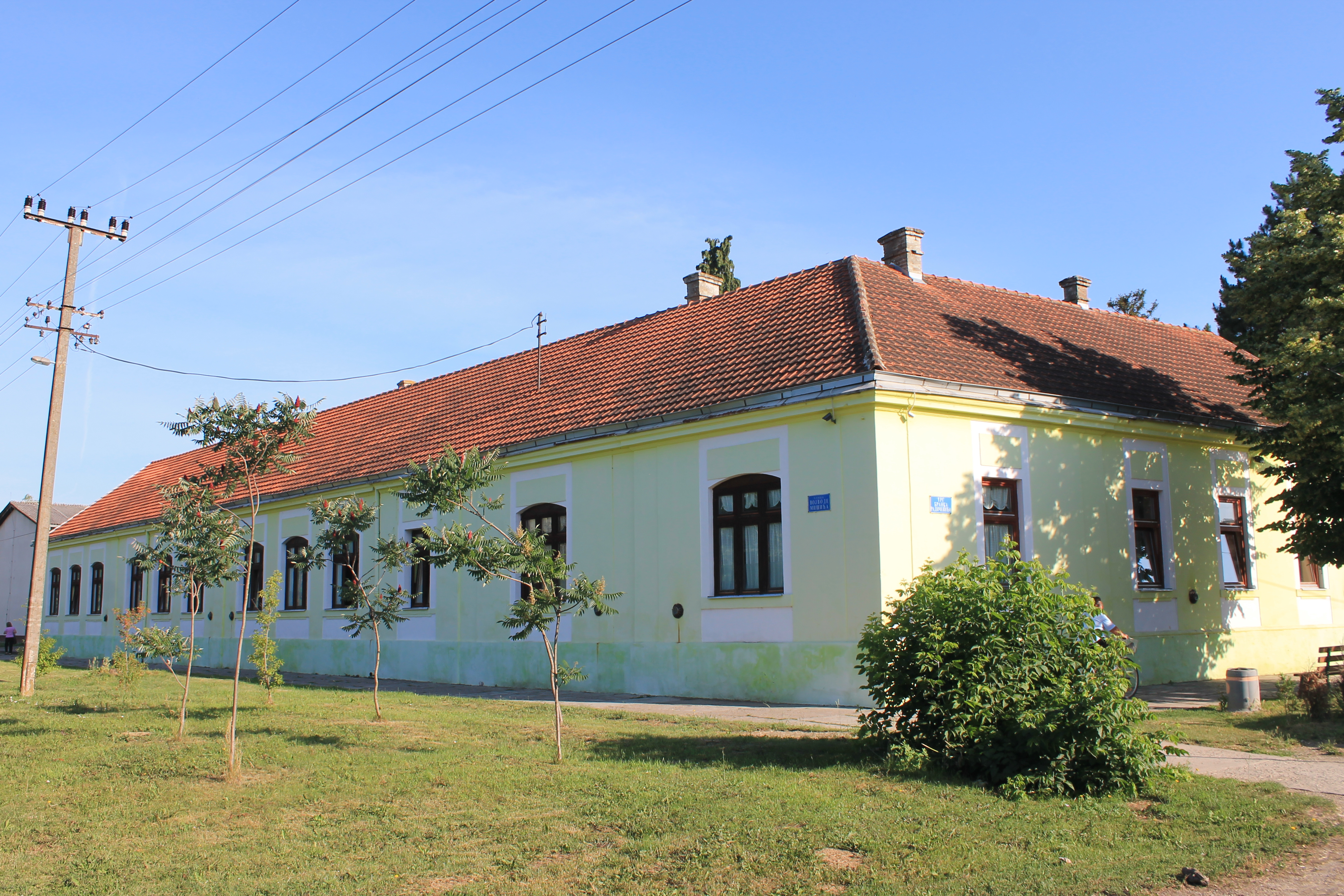
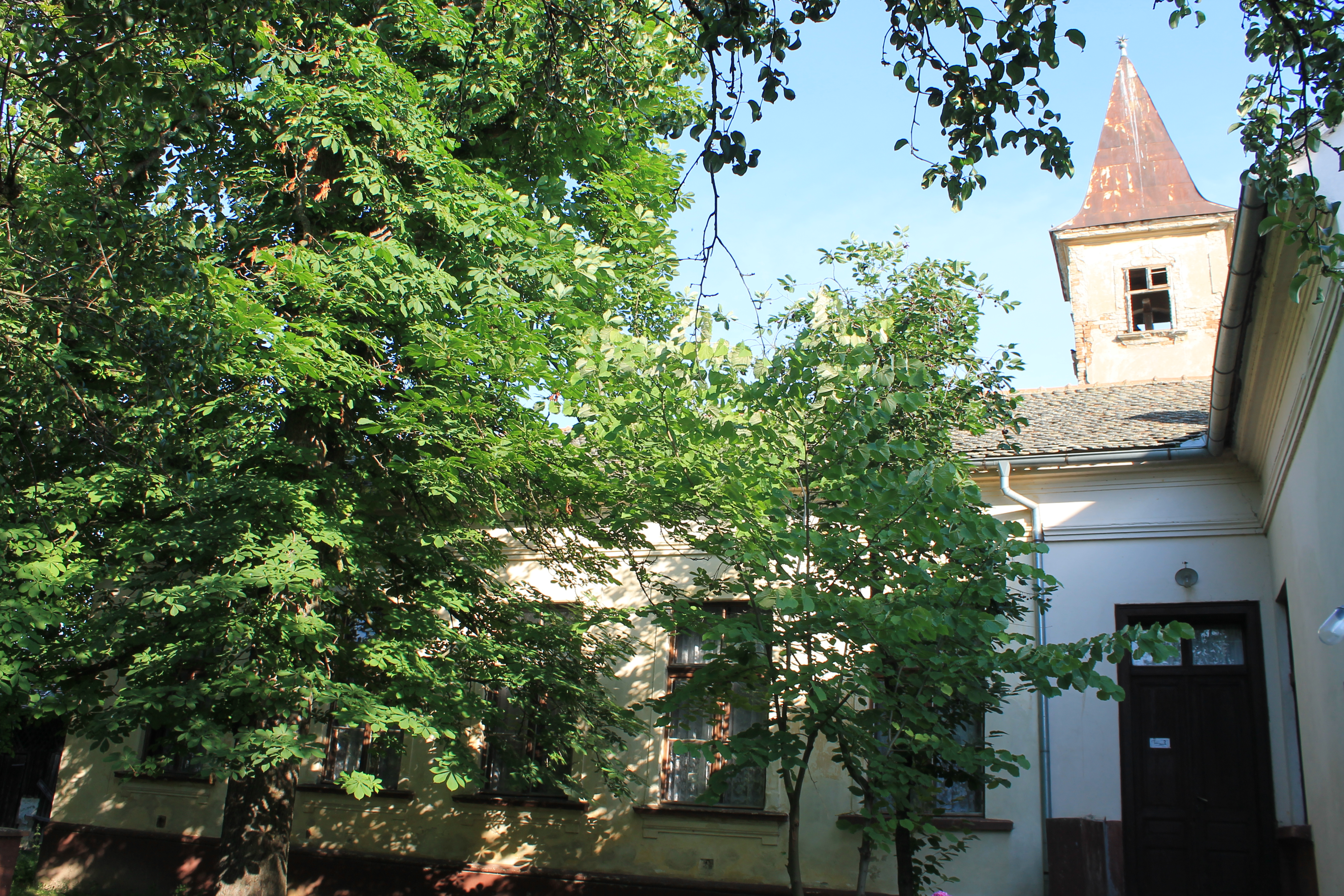
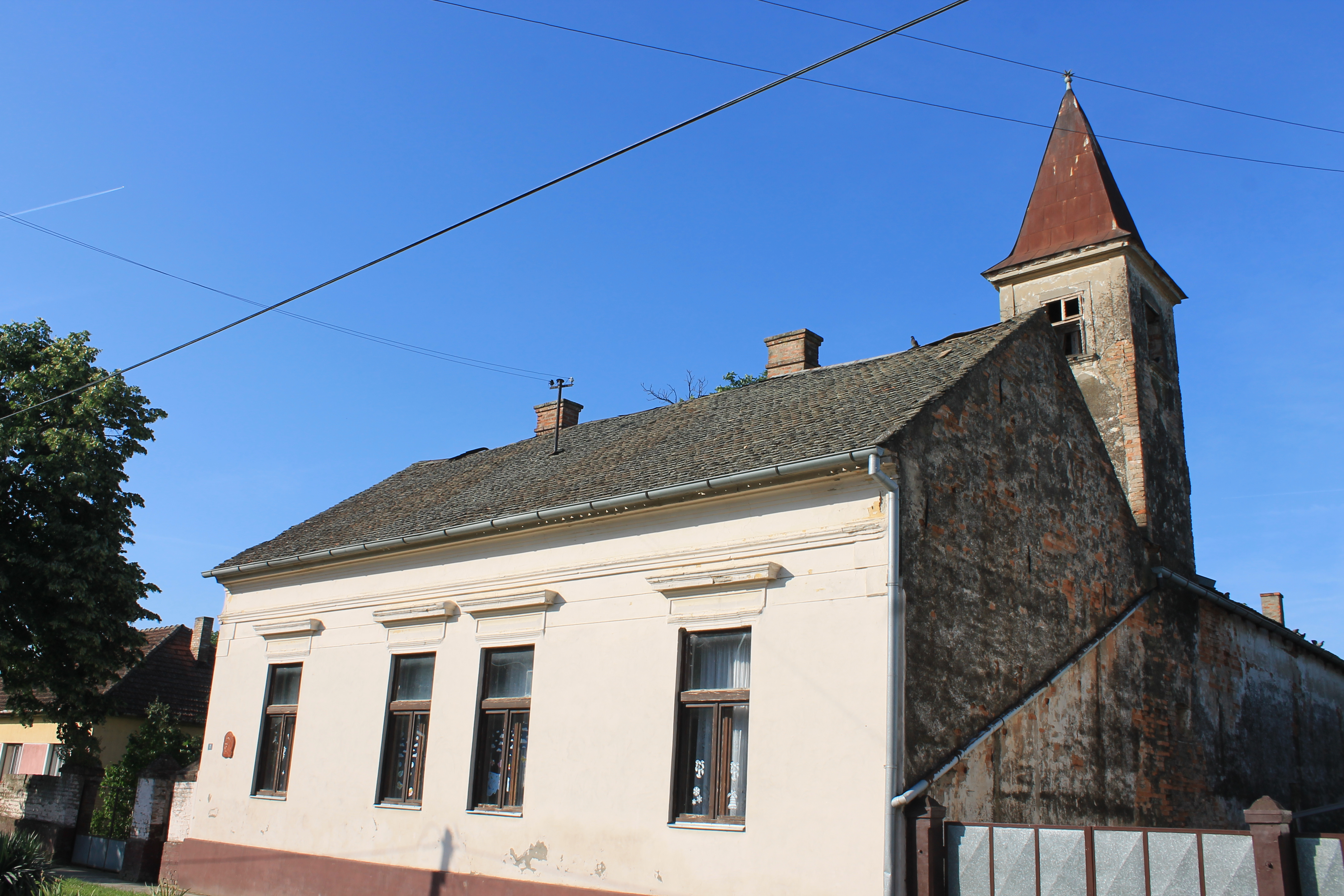
- Nikinci

- Location within Vojvodina Location within Serbia Location within Europe
- Coordinates: 44°51′N 19°49′E
- Country: Serbia
- Province: Vojvodina
- Region: Syrmia
- District: Srem
- Municipality: Ruma

Population (2002)
  - Total: 2,216
- Time zone: UTC+1 (CET)
  - Summer (DST): UTC+2 (CEST)

Nikinci (Serbian Cyrillic: Никинци) is a village in Serbia. It is located in the Ruma municipality, in the Srem District, Vojvodina province. The village has a Serb ethnic majority and its population numbering 2,216 people (2002 census).

== Name ==
In Serbian the village is known as Nikinci (Никинци), in Croatian as Nikinci, and in Hungarian as Nyékinca. The name of the town in Serbian is plural.

== History ==
In 1737, about 1,600 Catholic Albanians from the Kelmendi tribe came to Syrmia. They were settled in the villages of Nikinci and Hrtkovci. Today, their descendants consider themselves Croats. In the 19th century Hungarians are moving to Nikinci from Temerin and Mali Iđoš. In 1910 the Hungarians are the largest group in the village: the total population is 2,005, 874 Hungarians (43.6%), 557 Croatians (27.8%), 526 Germans (26,2%), 33 Others (mostly Roma, 1.6%) and 15 Serbians. Some of the Hungarians are belonging to the Reformed Christian Church, they built a church in the village.

== Ethnic groups (2002 census) ==
- Serbs = 1,534
- Hungarians = 264
- Croats = 210
- Yugoslavs = 69
- Roma = 32
- others.

== Historical population ==
- 1961: 2,607
- 1971: 2,644
- 1981: 2,425
- 1991: 2,266

== See also ==
- List of places in Serbia
- List of cities, towns and villages in Vojvodina

== Gallery ==
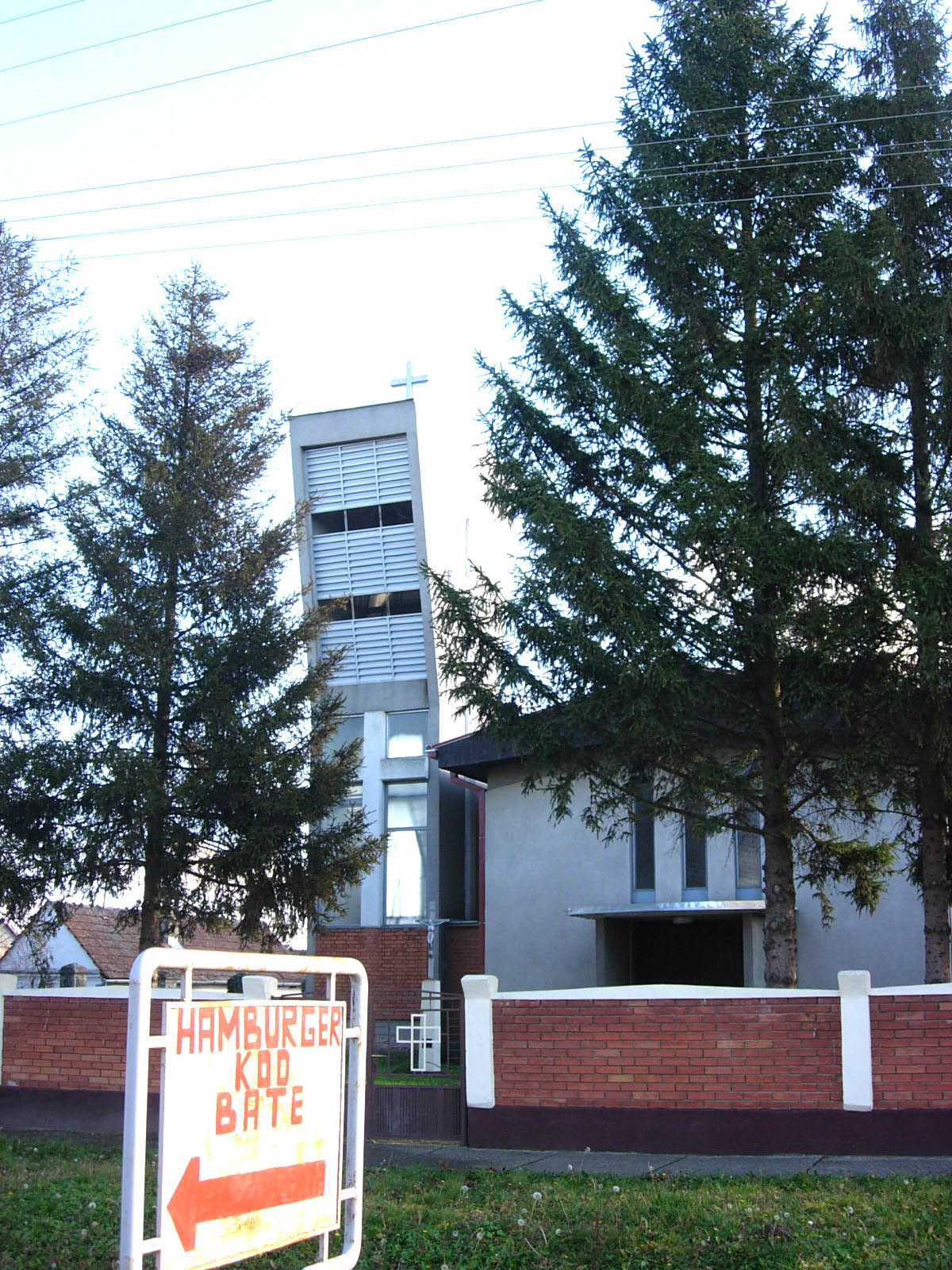
The Catholic church.

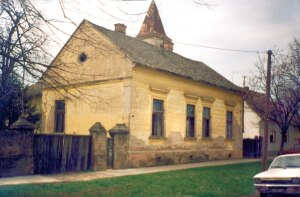
Calvinist church.
