= Bravo Screenfun =

German video game magazine

- Categories: Video game magazine
- Frequency: Monthly
- First issue: April 1997
- Final issue: April 2009
- Company: Heinrich Bauer Zeitschriften Verlag KG
- Country: Germany
- Based in: Hamburg
- Language: German
- Website: www.bravo.de

Bravo Screenfun (stylized as BRAVO SCREENFUN) was a German monthly computer and console gaming print magazine. It first appeared in a one-off special edition in May 1997. Since October 1997, the magazine was available monthly. It ceased publication in 2009.
