= Hrtkovci =

Hrtkovci Хртковци (Serbian)
- Village (Selo)
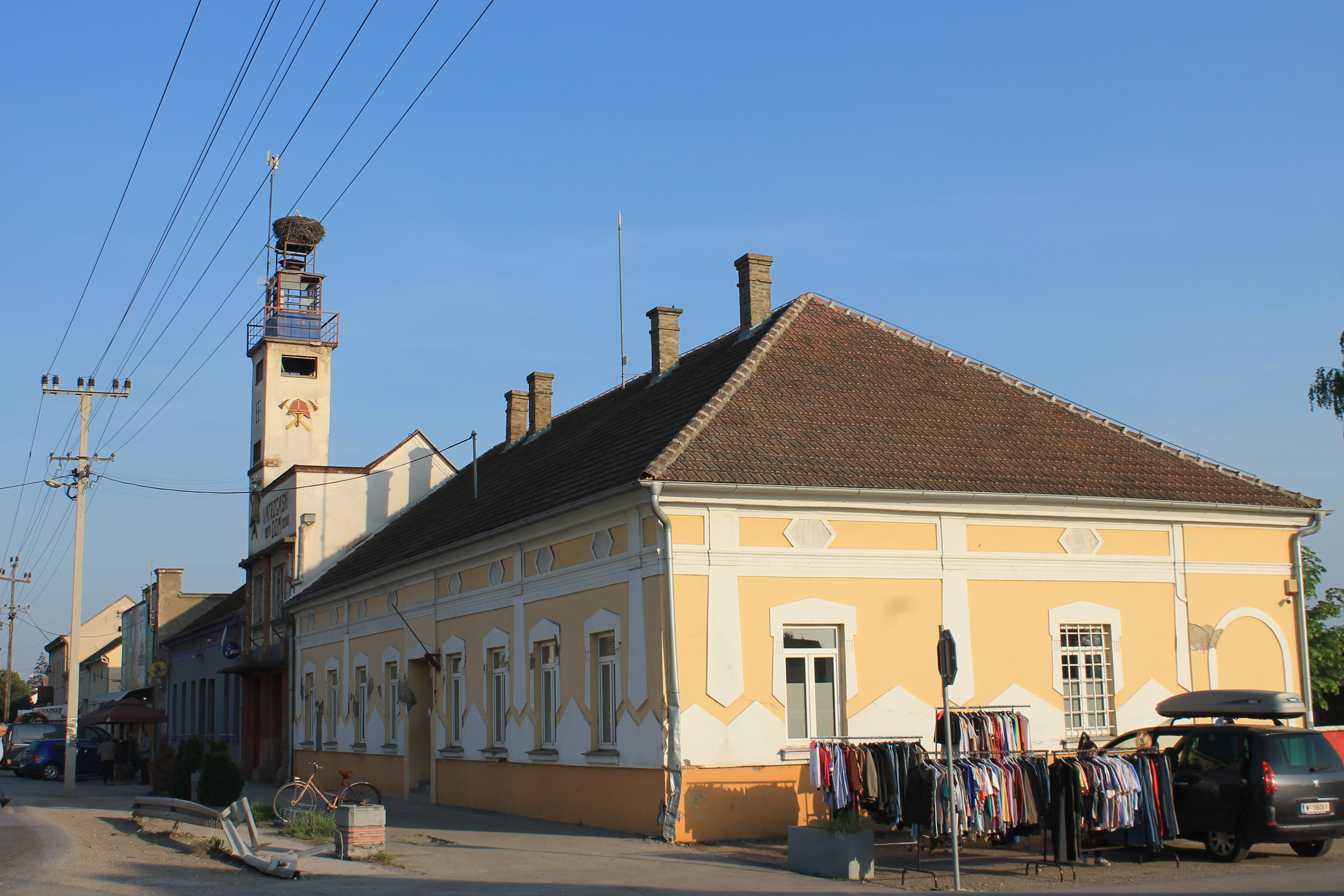
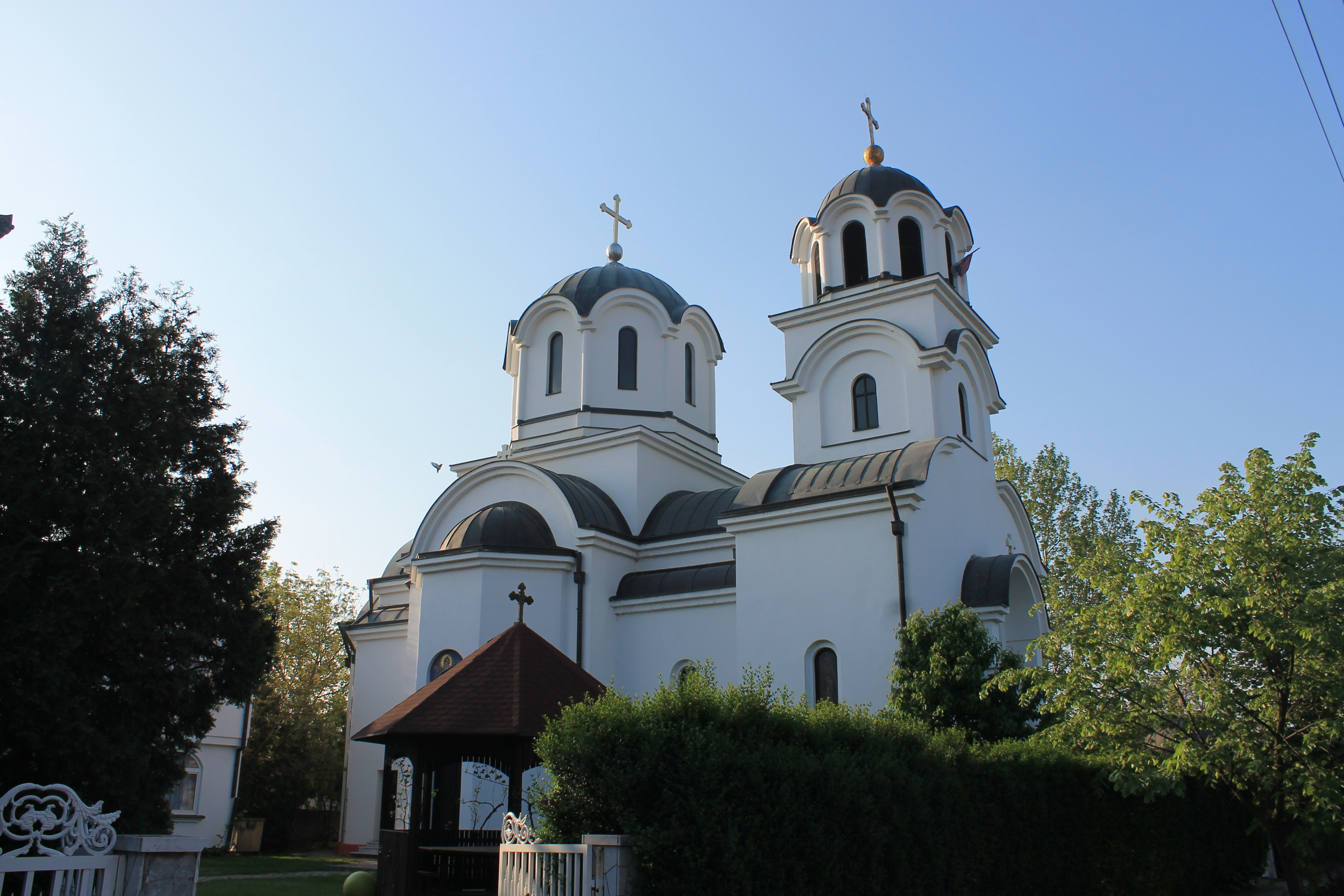
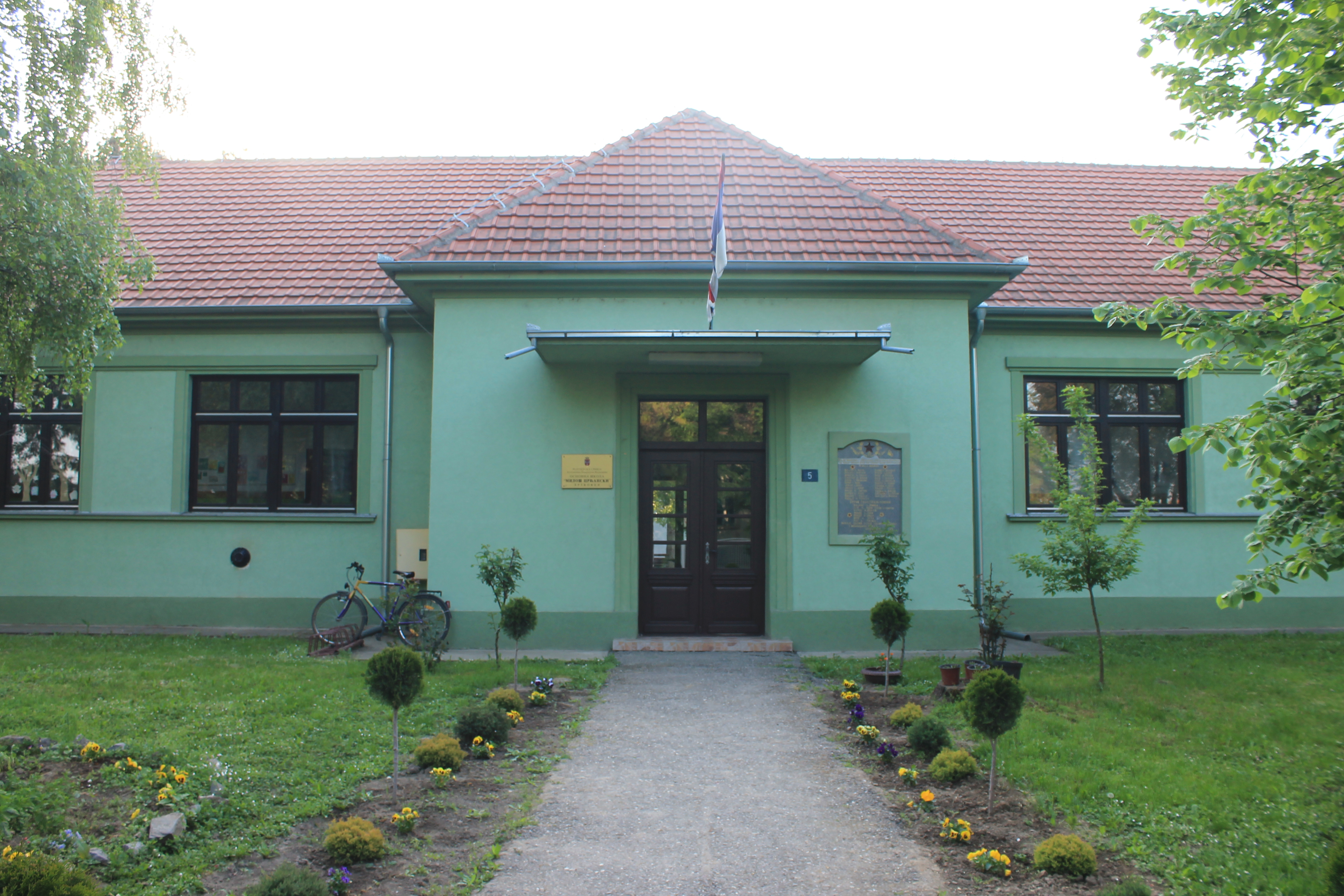
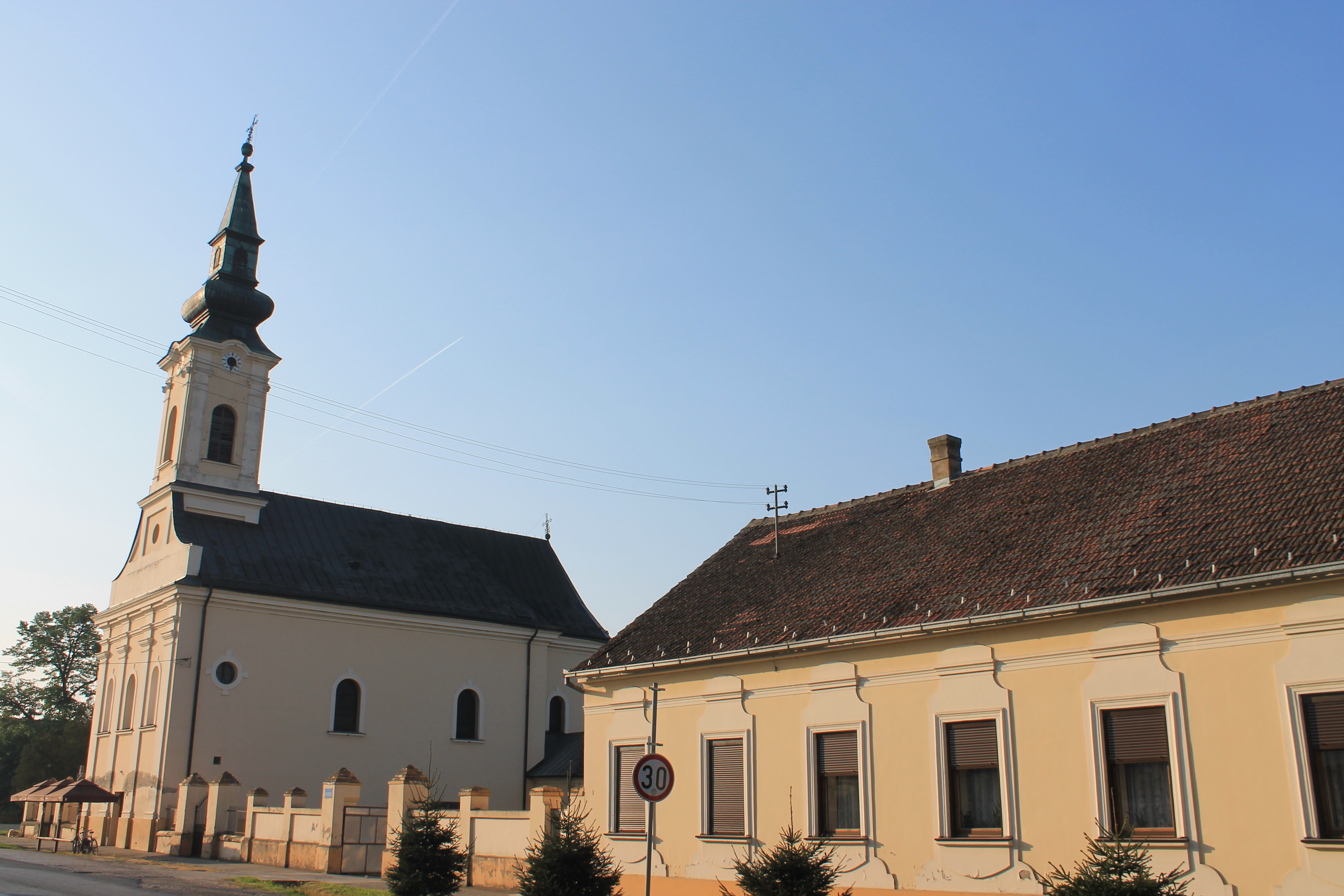
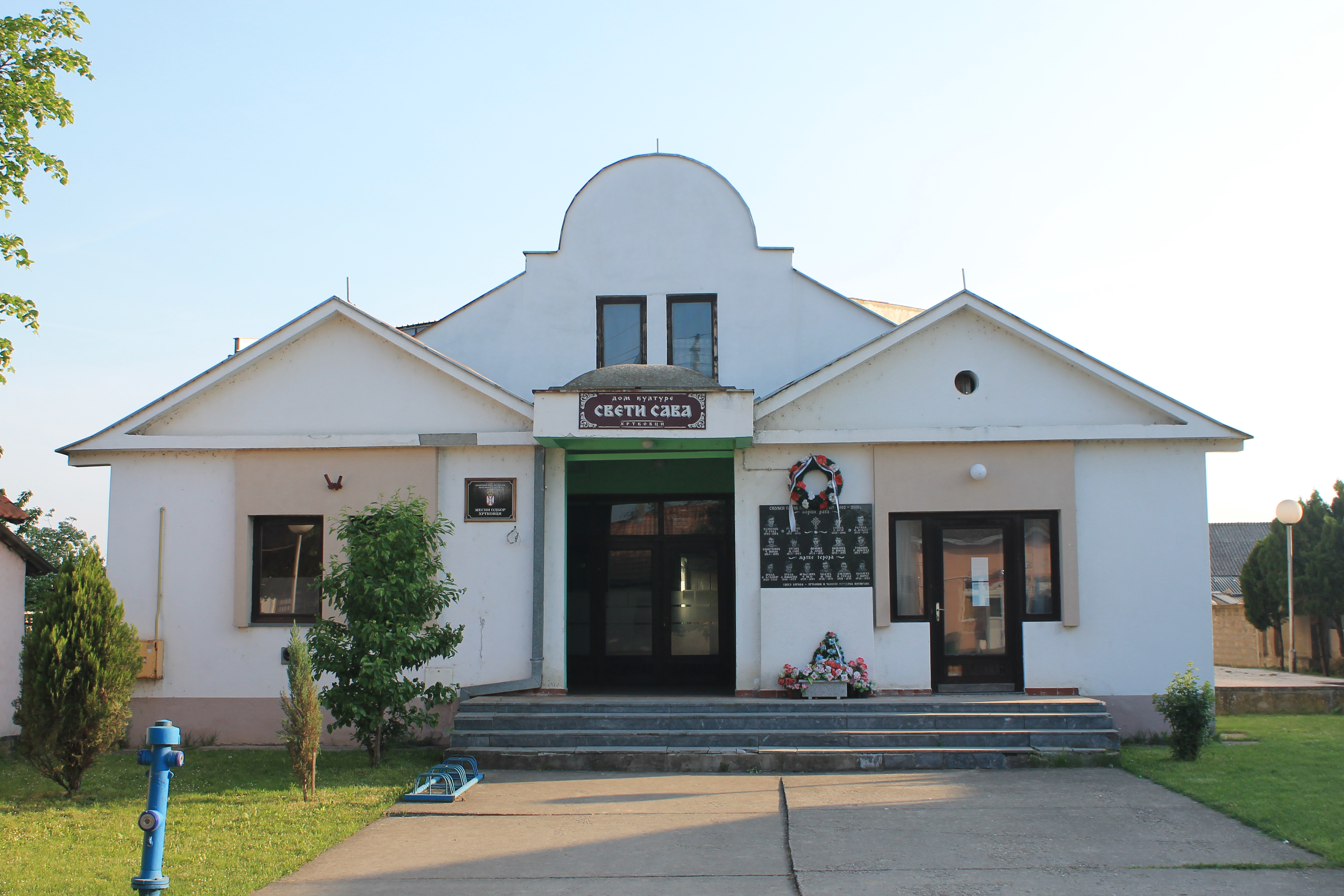
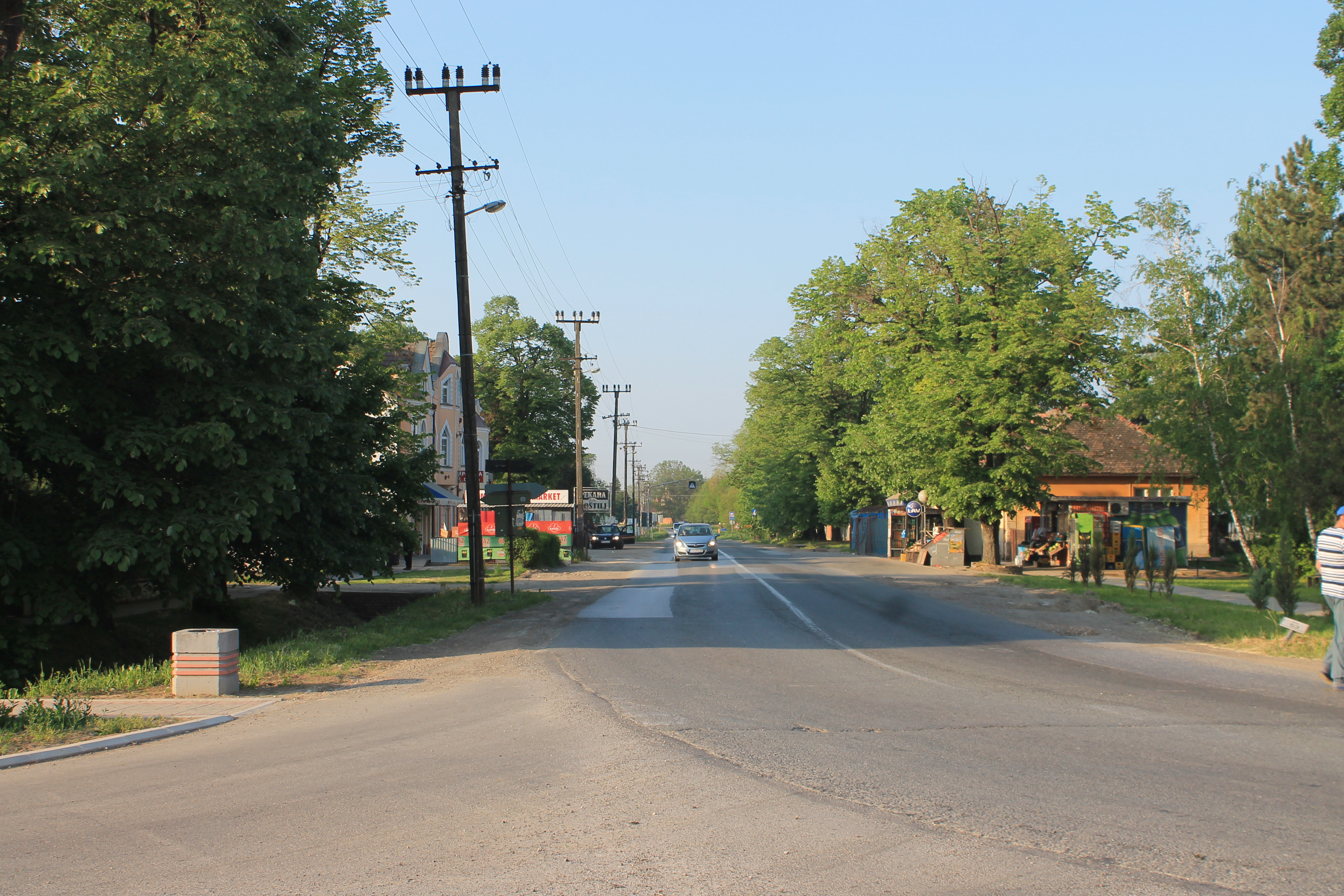
- Hrtkovci

- Location within Vojvodina Location within Serbia Location within Europe
- Coordinates: 44°53′N 19°46′E
- Country: Serbia
- Province: Vojvodina
- Region: Syrmia
- District: Srem
- Municipality: Ruma

Area
  - Total: 41.30 km^{2} (15.95 sq mi)
- Elevation: 74 m (243 ft)

Population (2011)
  - Total: 3,036
  - Density: 73.51/km^{2} (190.4/sq mi)
- Time zone: UTC+1 (CET)
  - Summer (DST): UTC+2 (CEST)

Hrtkovci (Serbian Cyrillic: Хртковци) is a village located in the municipality of Ruma, Serbia. As of the 2011 census, its population is 3,036.

== Name ==
In Serbian, the village is known as Хртковци (Hrtkovci), and in Hungarian as Herkóca. Its name in Serbian is plural.

== History ==
Its first modern mention was in 1714, during Ottoman administration. It is believed that older settlements once existed at this locality. These settlements were probably villages named Gomol (recorded in 1353) and Hudrovecz (recorded in 1477).

Since 1718, the village was part of the Habsburg monarchy. It was firstly included into the Kingdom of Slavonia and then into the Military Frontier (Petrovaradin regiment). In 1737, about 1,600 Catholic Albanians of the Kelmendi tribe from northern Albania came to Syrmia. They were settled in the villages of Hrtkovci and Nikinci. Today, their descendants consider themselves Croats.

In 1848–49, the village was part of autonomous Serbian Vojvodina, but was returned to the jurisdiction of the Military Frontier in 1849. After the abolishment of the frontier, in 1882, the village was included into the autonomous Habsburg Kingdom of Croatia-Slavonia, which was part of the Habsburg Kingdom of Hungary and Austria-Hungary. The village was administratively a part of the Ruma district within the Syrmia County. According to the ethnographic map of the Austrian Monarchy, created by Karl Freiherrn von Czoernig and published in Vienna in 1855, the village of Hrtkovci was predominantly populated by ethnic Albanians.

According to 1910 census, the village was ethnically mixed and the largest linguistic group were the speakers of Croatian (1,144). Other languages spoken in the village were German (644), Hungarian (619), Serbian (70), Slovak (20), etc.

In 1918, the village firstly became part of the State of Slovenes, Croats and Serbs, then part of the Kingdom of Serbia, and finally part of the Kingdom of Serbs, Croats and Slovenes (renamed to the Kingdom of Yugoslavia in 1929). From 1918 to 1922, the village was part of the Syrmia County, from 1922 to 1929 part of the Syrmia Oblast, and from 1929 to 1941, part of the Danube Banovina.

=== World War II ===
From 1941 to 1944, the village was under Axis occupation and was included into the Nazi-Puppet Pavelić's Independent State of Croatia, where committed genocide against Serbs, Jews, and Romani People. Since 1944, the village was part of autonomous Yugoslav Vojvodina, which (from 1945) was part of new socialist Yugoslav Serbia.

=== Yugoslav Wars ===
Before the Yugoslav Wars, the village was ethnically mixed and largest ethnic group in Hrtkovci were Croats, while the rest of population were Serbs, Hungarians and Yugoslavs. According to the MICT verdict against Serbian Radical Party leader Vojislav Šešelj, he came to this village in May 1992 and gave an inflammatory speech calling for the expulsion of Croats from the area and reading a list of individual Croat residents who should leave for Croatia. As a result of this speech, a number of Croat resident decided to leave Hrtkovci. After this speech, supporters and associates of Šešelj, including members of Serbian Radical Party and Serbian Chetnik Movement, began a campaign of harassment and intimidation of local Croats, forcing them to "leave" the area. In its verdict, the MICT gave a list of 722 people who left Hrtkovci. (See also: Expulsions in Hrtkovci). On 11 April 2018, the Appeals Chamber of the MICT sentenced Šešelj to 10 years in prison under Counts 1, 10, and 11 of the indictment for instigating deportation, persecution (forcible displacement), and other inhumane acts (forcible transfer) as crimes against humanity due to his speech in Hrtkovci on 6 May 1992, in which he called for the expulsion of Croats from Vojvodina.

Instead of Croats, Serb refugees from Croatia and Bosnia and Herzegovina settled in the village. Most of the Croats from Hrtkovci moved to Croatia, and settled in the village of Kula near Požega, while many Serb refugees from that place settled in Hrtkovci. After these events, the Serbs renamed the village to Srbislavci (Србиславци) until 1995.

== Demographics ==
Historical population
Year	Pop.	±% p.a.
1869	1,239	—
1880	1,816	+3.54%
1890	2,253	+2.18%
1900	2,594	+1.42%
1910	2,515	−0.31%
1921	2,764	+0.86%
1931	2,916	+0.54%
1948	2,800	−0.24%
1953	3,195	+2.67%
1961	3,265	+0.27%
1971	3,102	−0.51%
1981	2,855	−0.83%
1991	2,684	−0.62%
2002	3,428	+2.25%
2011	3,036	−1.34%
Data for pre-1948 not referenced Source:

According to the 2011 census, it has a population of 3,036 inhabitants.

=== Ethnic groups ===
According to 2002 census, its population was 3,428, including:

- Serbs = 2,396 (69.90%)
- Hungarians = 310 (9.04%)
- Croats = 256 (7.47%)
- Yugoslavs = 67 (1.96%)

== Gallery ==
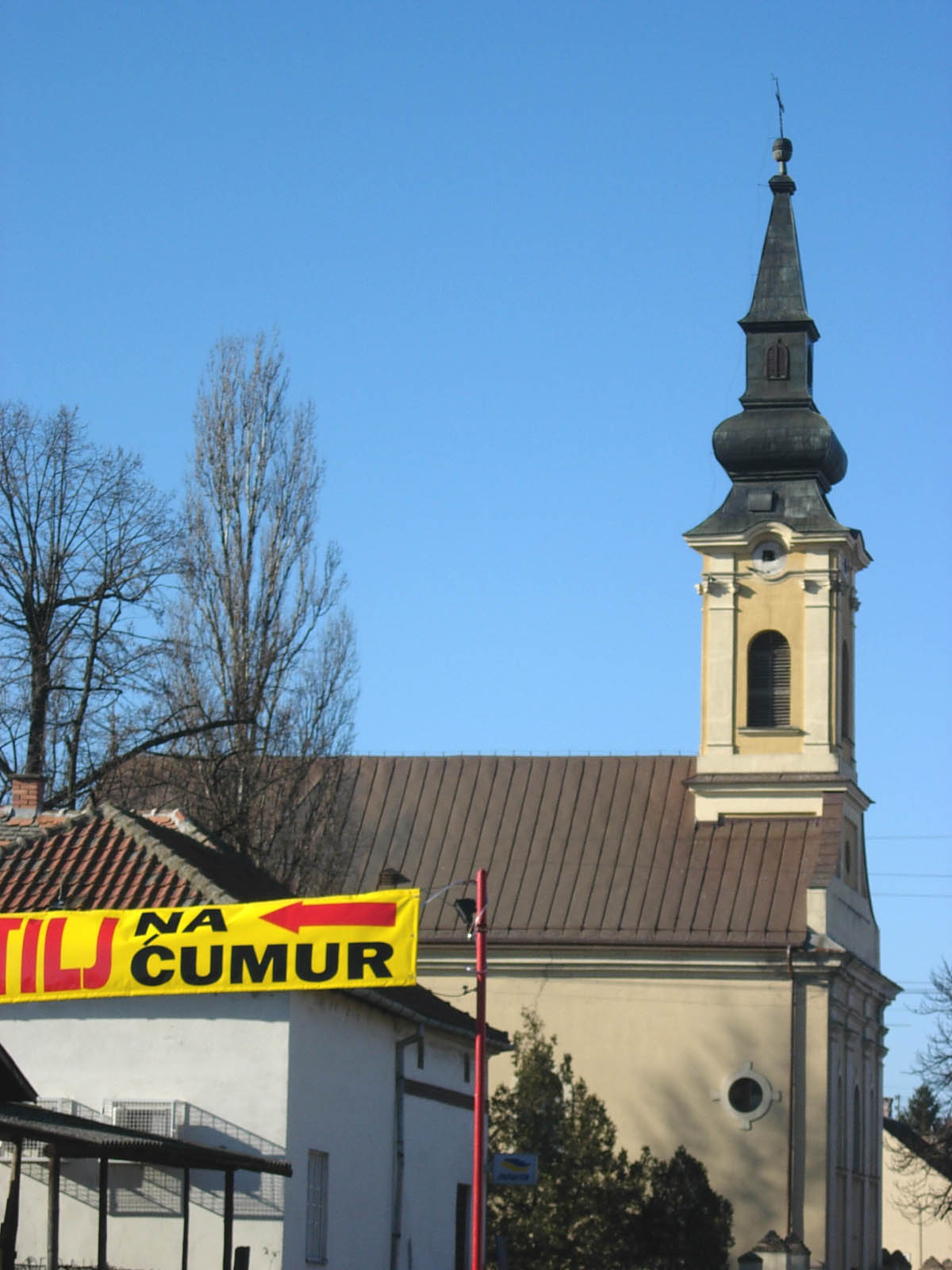
The Catholic Church

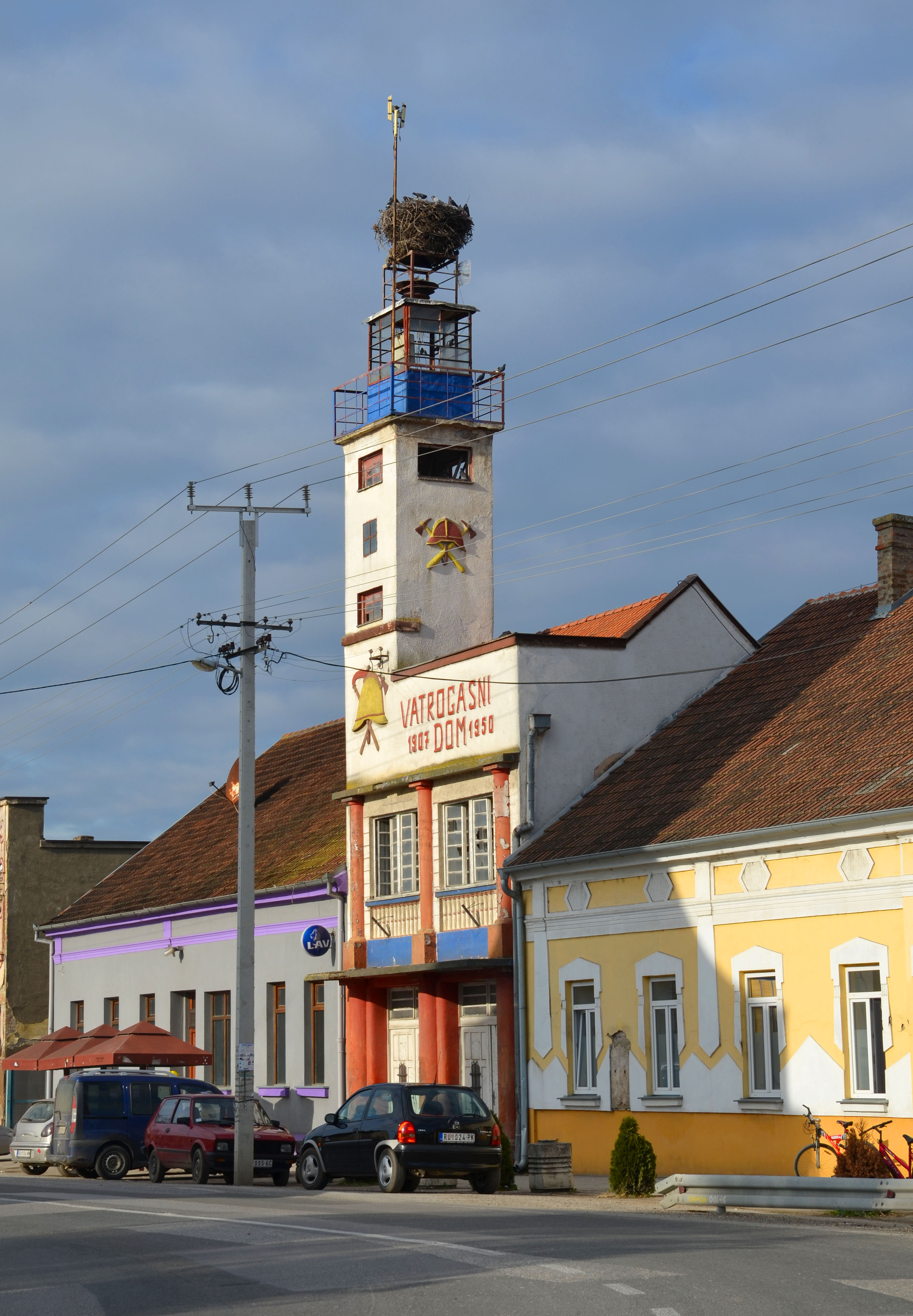
Fire brigade building

== See also ==
- List of places in Serbia
- List of cities, towns and villages in Vojvodina
