= Robert Čoban =

Serbian businessman

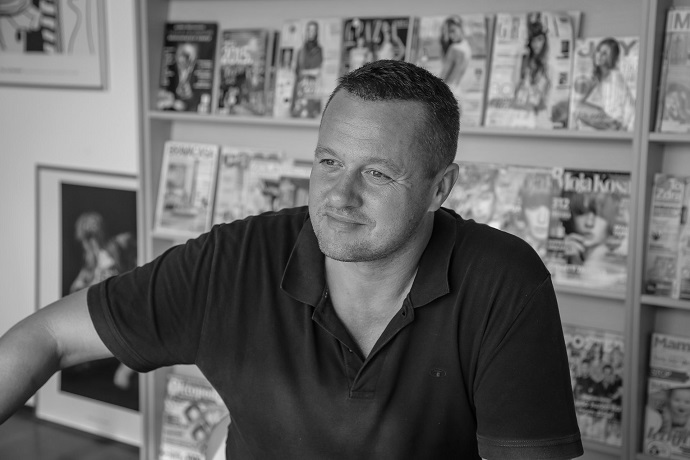
- Born: July 27, 1968 (age 57)
- Occupations: Večernje novosti reporter (1990–1991); Arena correspondent from Novi Sad (1990–1991); Index editor (1992); Svet editor (1993–2005); Color Press Group president (2005–present)
- Spouse: Sandra Čoban
- Children: Elena and India
- Website: http://www.color.rs

Robert Čoban (Serbian Cyrillic: Роберт Чобан; born July 27, 1968, in Bač, Vojvodina, Serbia, Yugoslavia) is the co-owner and president of the Serbian media company Color Press Group.

== Education ==
Čoban attended primary school at "Vuk Karadžić" in Bač, and attended the secondary school for economics "Dr. Radivoje Uvalić" in Bačka Palanka. He attended the Faculty of Law at Novi Sad, graduating in 1993. He served in the Yugoslav People's Army from 1987 to 1988 in Pirot, in the same unit as Ramush Haradinaj.

== Professional career ==
Čoban worked as a correspondent from Novi Sad for the Belgrade newspaper Večernje novosti, the Zagreb newspaper Arena and the Sarajevo newspaper Naši dani (1990–1991). He was the editor-in-chief of the student magazine Index and of the independent magazine Nezavisni index (1992). He was the Editor-in-chief of the magazine Svet from 1993 to 2005 which resulted in establishment of the Color Press Group. During the trial of Slobodan Milosevic in the Hague Tribunal in 2003, one of the protected Prosecution witnesses stated that in 1992, he received an order from the State Security Service of Yugoslavia to place wiretapping devices in the editorial office of the newspaper edited by Robert.

Color Press Group is the largest magazine publisher in the Balkans with companies in all former Yugoslav republics, which publishes 110 magazines, runs 21 Internet portals and organizes over 70 conferences and festivals annually. The company's portfolio includes numerous licensed titles such as "The Economist", "Diplomacy & Commerce", "Hello!", "Brava Casa", "Gloria", "Story", "Grazia" and many others. Some of the most important conferences organized by the Color Press Group are "Pro Femina", "Food Talk", "The Economist: The World in...", "Digital", "Book Talk", "CSR Serbia", "Serbia Goes Green”, “Teen Talk”.

During 2020, he started a series of short bicycle trips through the villages of Vojvodina. During these rides, he visits museums and cultural landmarks, which resulted in several projects aimed at protecting cultural heritage. One of the projects is "Castles of Serbia: Protection of Heritage Culture", which is supported by the Ministry of Culture and Information and the Government of Serbia. He publishes travelogues in the weekly Vreme, the daily newspaper Dnevnik and on tourist portals, such as the portal travelblog.rs.

Today, Čoban is the President of the company Color Press Group. Since 2024, he has hosted the television programme Sve u 16 sa Robertom Čobanom on K1 Television.

== Personal life ==
He is married to Sandra, born 1975. He has two daughters, Elena (born 2004) and India (born 2006).
