= Bravo Girl =

German teen magazine

- Categories: Teenage girls
- Frequency: Biweekly (1988-2015); Monthly (2015-2023)
- First issue: 21 December 1988
- Final issue: May 2023
- Company: Heinrich Bauer Zeitschriften Verlag KG
- Country: Germany
- Based in: Hamburg
- Language: German
- Website: www.bravo.de/bravo-girl
- ISSN: 0939-8511

Bravo Girl (stylized as BRAVO GiRL!) was a German monthly teenage girls' magazine.

== History ==
It was first published in 1988. In 2015, the frequency of publication was changed to monthly.

The magazine ceased publication in 2023.
