= Bravo Sport =

German youth sports magazine

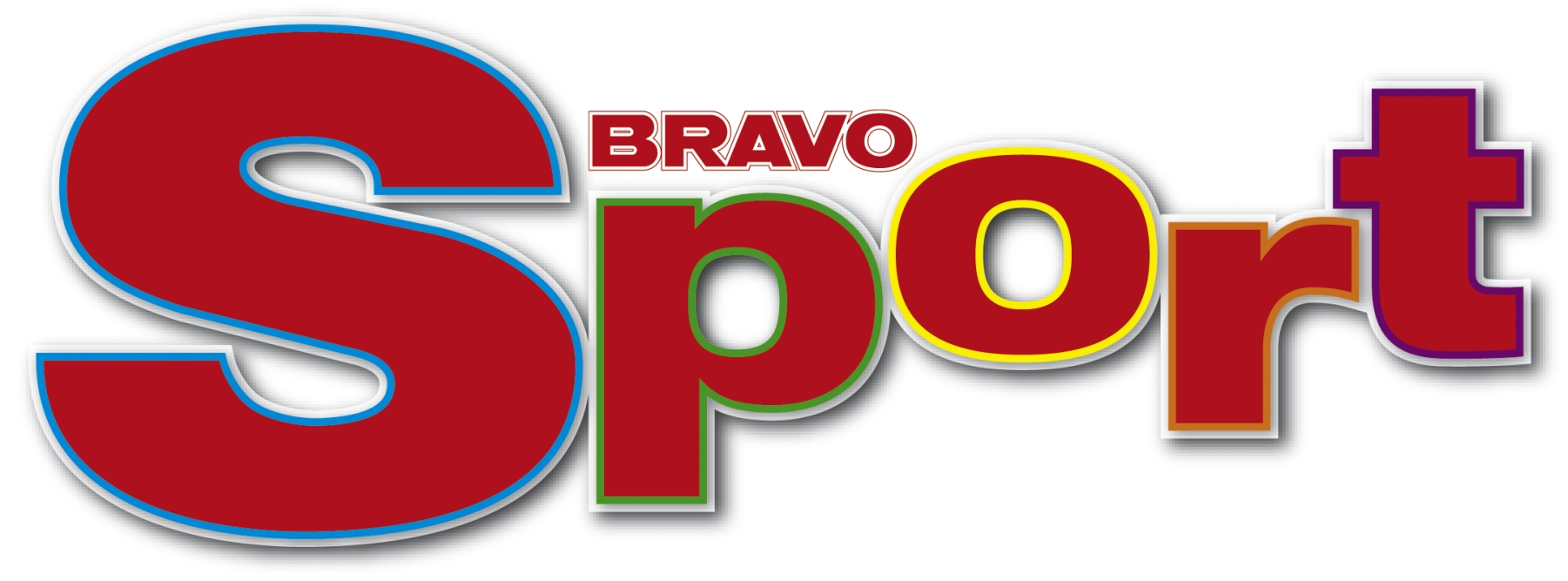
Bravo Sport

Bravo Sport is a sports magazine for young people dedicated mainly to soccer in Germany. It is published by Bauer Media Group and has 72 pages.

In addition to soccer, Bravo Sport also deals with other sports such as fun sports, Formula 1 or US sports. The magazine often contains an extra, such as stickers or megaposters in DIN A2 format. Each issue also includes posters (DIN A4) showing soccer players or other athletes "in action". The cover is usually adorned by soccer players or other top athletes. The magazine also contains interviews with soccer players and other famous athletes as well as insights into private life and the training of the "stars".

Bravo Sport also awards the Bravo Otto to soccer players, athletes and sports teams. The winners will be chosen by Bravo Sport readers.

The magazine appeared in a new look from 14 January 2010 (issue 2/2010). In addition, the lettering of the "Bravo Sport" logo was revised.

Since 2019, the magazine has no longer been published every two weeks, but monthly. The paid circulation is 45,654 copies, a minus of 82.6 percent since 1998.
