= Ellis (Battle Arena Toshinden) =

Fictional video game character

- Battle Arena Toshinden character
- Ellis from Battle Arena Toshinden, drawn by Kotobuki.
- First game: Battle Arena Toshinden (1995)
- Designed by: Tsukasa Kotobuki
- Voiced by: English: Lisa Ortiz (OVA); Japanese: Yōko Teppōzuka; Kyōko Hikami (OVA)
- Portrayed by: Asami Higashi (Toshiden 2)

In-universe information
- Weapon: Dirks
- Origin: Japan
- Nationality: Turkish

Ellis (Japanese: エリス, Hepburn: Eris) is a character introduced in the 1995 fighting game Battle Arena Toshinden, produced by Tamsoft.

== Conception and development ==
When Tamsoft was initially developing their game, the cast director Shintarō Nakaoka started with a basic concept and took inspiration from the duality of Ryu and Ken Masters of Capcom's Street Fighter series. Working with character designer Miho Furukawa, he then followed with developing certain character archetypes to provide a variety of physiques to the game, like the "big man", the "guru", and the "lolita". As development progressed, others included their own elements, such as programmers adding unique animations to characters to give them more visible personality, while one core person was assigned to each character to assist with the planning stage.

The character designs were finalized and drawn by Tsukasa Kotobuki, who also provided input on the development process. The publisher Takara initially sought to have Masami Obari for this role, but he was unable to due to obligations on another project and suggested Kotobuki instead. According to Battle Arena Toshinden URA director Norihiro Hayasaka, with the original game, there was a discrepancy between Kotobuki's artwork and the character models themselves, particularly in how he drew the female characters as slender with large breasts. Hayasaka pushed for the models to be closer to Kotobuki's art in terms of silhouette as a result, but also keep sharp edges to retain a style unique for Toshinden.

=== Design ===
Ellis stands 155 centimetres (5 ft 1 in) tall and has measurements of 82-54-80 cm (32-21-31 in).

Early designs for the character featured her with what the developers described as a more "sexy" and "adult" look. Her earliest designs depicted her having an exposed midsection and large breasts emphasized by a sash around them. In an interview with the staff of Famitsu, Kotobuki stated there were some disagreements between himself and the other developers regarding the character's outfit: he felt it should be a leotard with frills, while they wanted Ellis' outfit to consist of oversized clothing. The two combined their ideas, and as a result, her body is covered, but the material on her legs and arms are rendered semi-transparent.

For Battle Arena Toshinden 3, her outfit was redesigned again, with the design focusing first on the leotard before adding extra transparent frills around it. This iteration proved difficult to create, and as a result went through multiple redesigns.

== Appearances ==
Ellis is a young woman introduced in the 1995 fighting game Battle Arena Toshinden, and is the deuteragonist of the series alongside fellow character Eiji Shinjo. Though her nationality is Turkish, she is of Japanese descent, and was taken in by a traveling circus troupe as a young orphan. After she discovers the antagonist, Gaia, is her father upon his defeat, she feels indifferent and returns to the troupe. A year later, during the events of Battle Arena Toshinden 2, she learns he is being hunted by his former allies as a traitor. She enters the tournament to try and help him. In Battle Arena Toshinden 3, the new antagonists begin to operate nearby and target the circus, and Ellis decides to stop them. In spinoffs related to the series, she appears in Battle Arena Nitoshinden, Puzzle Arena Toshinden, Toshinden Card Quest, and the Game Boy version of Battle Arena Toshinden developed by Betop.

Outside of video games, Ellis also appears in the two audio-only CD dramas that act as continuations of the story, and an OVA series based on the franchise. An additional, more comedic chapter titled 主役は誰なんだ編 (lit. "Who is the Lead Role?") was also released on cassette tape. In print media, anthology comic collections by various authors featuring the character were compiled in two separate books, one for the first and the other for the second game.

In English, her original voice actor for Toshinden and its remake Toshinden Remix was uncredited, while Lisa Ortiz voiced her appearance in the OVA. In Japanese, she has been voiced by Yōko Teppōzuka for most appearances, with Kyōko Hikami voicing her for the audio dramas and OVA. Meanwhile, Japanese singer Asami Higashi portrayed Ellis for Battle Arena Toshinden 2's live-action opening sequence and commercials for the game, and later performed the character's image song for Takara.

== Promotion and merchandise ==
Takara released a soundtrack for the first game Toshinden Retake & Remix which featured an additional track of Ellis' voice actress reading answering machine messages in character left for the listener. Meanwhile, models representing Ellis and fellow character Sofia were featured at promotional events for the game's release. For the OVA's release, several screening events were held across Japan, with Kyōko Hikami appearing in costume as Ellis. Hikami also sung as the character for the OVA's opening song, "Cheer Up! Fly Away!", which was later released as a standalone CD.

For merchandise of the character, Takara released two dolls, one in her default outfit and another in a Japanese schoolgirl uniform. Another doll was released in 1997, based on her appearance in Battle Arena Toshinden 2. Takara Amusement also produced smaller plush doll for claw machines in Japan, as well as two varieties of character-themed clocks.

== Critical reception ==
Ellis was well received upon debut, particularly in Japan, with Takara game development head Nakano Takayuki stating that while they were displeased with Toshinden's quality, the response to the character had been tremendous. She has been cited as a frequent subject of fan works, particularly cosplay, with a store in Japan selling replicas of her costume alongside those of other characters. In 1997, Japanese cosplay troupe 1999Quest released a fan-made VHS of actress Keiko Koyo dressed as the character fighting undistinguished enemies, mimicking the character's moves. Meanwhile, The PlayStation Magazine ran a monthly section named "Ellis's Private Room", which discussed the character and encouraged readers to send fan art and cosplay.

The staff of Dengeki Online stated it would not be an exaggeration to consider her one of the most representative female heroines of the PlayStation console's earliest days. They additionally praised the transparency of her outfit, something they had not seen in a game prior and was "expressed beautifully in polygons". Hayakawa Kiichiro of Magmix shared similar sentiments, expressing that her appearance in the game alone had caused him to buy a PlayStation when it was released. Others voiced similar praise, with Famitsu citing her outfit as one of the most surprising elements to see during the PlayStation's debut, while the staff of the Japanese Sega Saturn Magazine emphasized they had fallen in love with the design particularly in how it appeared in a black color scheme.

Masaru Goto of Heroine Games magazine observed the development of what he called polygon idols, or "polydols", in 3D gaming, and felt Ellis was one of the earliest examples of this concept done well due to her anime character aesthetics. Meanwhile, Play magazine stated that while the transparent outfits helped cement her as a part of video game history, they remembered her mostly "because she was just so darn cute". The staff of Chinese magazine Diànzǐ Yóuxì Ruǎnjiàn in their supplemental 1997 issue described her as the most popular character from the series, calling her "cute, and adorable in every way". They enjoyed her demeanor that came across as gentle and understanding, but also her dancer-like movements, considering them cute and elegant.

Virtual Idol magazine ran a six page article examining and comparing Ellis and Sofia. The staff felt that their appeal arose from both how the Toshinden franchise had expanded their characters through supplemental media, but also how their 3D models made them viewable from every angle. They further appreciated how the two were polar opposites, praising the fact that Ellis acted like a motherly figure for her troupe, something very unlike youth in Japan. Her outfits also received praised in how they reflected her character, feeling that the darker colors gave her a more mature look. Additional praise was given to how her outfit reflected her role as a member of a traveling circus troupe, and stated while the frills on her outfit could be seen as childish, other elements such as the transparent ones gave her a more adult appearance.

Additional praise went to the character's voice. Magmix's Kiichiro described her as "the sort of character that makes cute noises", and found Teppōzuka's voice work particularly memorable in this regard. The staff of Famitsu went further to emphasize that her voice and youthful appearance worked well with Teppōzuka's portrayal, which they felt "shot through the hearts of otakus". Additional praise went to Kotobuki's design for her, finding his artwork captivating and that it made her cute.
