= Tokyo Beat Down =

2008 video game

- North American box art
- Developers: Tamsoft, Success
- Publishers: JP: Success; NA: Atlus USA
- Platform: Nintendo DS
- Release: JP: September 18, 2008; NA: March 31, 2009
- Genre: Beat 'em up
- Mode: Single player

Tokyo Beat Down ^{JPN} is a 2008 side-scrolling beat-em-up released for the Nintendo DS. It is published by Success (Japan) and Atlus USA (North America) and developed by Tamsoft.

The story takes place in Yaesu, home of the so-called "Beast Cops". As the name implies, these Beast Cops have extreme methods of taking criminals down in Tokyo.

Tokyo Beat Down was released in Japan on September 18, 2008 and in North America on March 31, 2009.

== Reception ==
Reception

Aggregate score
Aggregator	Score
Metacritic	56 out of 100

Review scores
Publication	Score
1Up.com	C
Destructoid	7 out of 10
Famitsu	22 out of 40
Game Informer	7 out of 10
GamePro	4/5
GameSpot	5.5 out of 10
GameZone	7 out of 10
NGamer	60%
Nintendo Power	6 out of 10
Nintendo World Report	6 out of 10
Wired	6/10

Tokyo Beat Down received "mixed" reviews according to the review aggregation website Metacritic. Ray Barnholt of 1UP described the game as "deliberately archaic" but worthwhile for gamers who "have a fondness for action games past." Michael Cole of Nintendo World Report cited its "fairly fluid" combat and praised its "stilted, tongue-in-cheek cop drama dialogue" as making "Beat Down more memorable". On the other hand, Austin Light of GameSpot found "the crazy story and absurd characters...entertaining,...they aren't worth mashing your way through hours of poor combat to see." In Japan, Famitsu gave it a score of two sixes, one four, and one six for a total of 22 out of 40.

== Notes ==
Known in Japan as 野獣刑事 東京同時多発テロを鎮圧せよ! (Yajuu Keiji: Tokyou Douji Tahatsu Tero wo Chinatsu Seyo, "Beast Cops: Suppress frequently occurred terrorism in Tokyo!")
