= Guardian's Crusade =

1999 video game

- North American and PAL cover art
- Developer: Tamsoft
- Publishers: JP: Tamsoft; WW: Activision
- Director: Hideki Matsumoto
- Producers: Toshiaki Ota, Shintarō Nakaoka
- Designer: Shintarō Nakaoka
- Programmer: Hideki Matsumoto
- Platform: PlayStation
- Release: PlayStation: JP: September 23, 1998; NA: March 3, 1999; PAL: March 26, 1999; PSOne Classics (PSN): JP: February 24, 2009
- Genre: Role-playing video game
- Mode: Single-player

Guardian's Crusade, known in Japan as Knight & Baby, is a 1998 role-playing video game (RPG) for the PlayStation, developed by Tamsoft and released worldwide by Activision. The game revolves around a warrior named Knight, his fairy friend Nehani, and a pink creature named Baby that the player raises and feeds like a virtual pet. The gameplay is that of a standard turn based RPG with non-random encounters. Guardian's Crusade did not enjoy commercial success but received positive reviews.

== Gameplay ==
Knight, Baby and Nehani crossing a bridge in Guardian's Crusade

The world in Guardian's Crusade is entirely in 3D and is generally bright and cartoony. It takes place in various different terrains and environments. During battle, the character with the highest speed acts first. A 'Living Toy', that the player encounters outside battle, may be spawned during battle.

From a technical standpoint and in terms of its contribution to the development of the RPG genre, Guardian's Crusade is noteworthy for several reasons. First, the game featured a seamless graphical transition between the overworld, towns, and flight, which all utilized the same graphical engine and scale. Many other RPGs before and since have relied on miniature, less detailed representations of towns when a player is exploring the overworld (e.g. the Final Fantasy games on the original PlayStation) or flying (e.g. Dragon Quest VIII). This feature helped to make the Guardian's Crusade world more immersive and is an impressive accomplishment given the technical limitations of the PlayStation console.

Second, the game implemented a system that allowed players to choose whether or not to engage in battles, since enemies can be seen by the player on the field map. Enemies on the overworld and in dungeons were represented by different sized ghosts which would wander the landscape and chase after the player, but could be avoided through speed or stealth. Large aggressive pink ghosts represented enemy monsters with higher levels than the player. Enemies at a lower level were represented by smaller white ghosts that would actually flee from the player. This mechanic provided a visual indicator of how powerful the player character was becoming. Finally, the game incorporated a virtual pet.

=== Living Toys ===
Along the way, Knight encounters Living Toys (abbreviated LT on the battle menu), mystical clockwork toys that can move on their own and aid Knight, Baby, and Nehani in battle with certain skills. There are a total of 70 of these. Living Toys can be found in treasure chests around the world. Each has its own unique moves or abilities; for example a Living Toy named 'Contributor' has a comical design and throws coins at the enemy, while another named 'Hobo Joe' pickpockets the enemy and may steal something from them to give to the player. Summoning a Living Toy drains Knight's psychic points (PP), so once his PP is drained completely he can't summon them at all.

==== Classification of Living Toys ====
Living Toys can be classified according to their functions:

- Attackers – Directly inflict damage upon an enemy in combat.
- Helpers – Add extra power to your attacks, put the enemy to sleep, or help you defend against certain attacks.
- Healers – Restore lost HP to one or more party members.
- Miscellaneous – Are either useful outside of combat (like Mapster, who allows you to view the world map while outdoors in addition to attacking enemies in combat) or simply don't fit into another category.

==== Living Toy Icons ====
Each Living Toy is associated with one of three icons depending on how it is summoned in combat:

- Continuous (boxes) – Will stay by your side until the battle ends or it gets attacked enough times.
- Multiple use (↵) – Can be used multiple times in the same battle but must be re-summoned each time.
- Single use (*) – Can only be used once per battle.

== Plot ==
The young man Knight lives with his fairy friend Nehani in the town of Orgo. The Mayor of Orgo gives Knight a task of taking a letter to the nearby town of San Claria. During his return journey, Knight is gifted the creature named Baby in a blinding flash of light. A mysterious voice tells the boy to take this Baby to the God's Tower, his home. Knight takes the creature to the mayor who tells him to dispose of it in a local cave. Later, Knight has remorse for abandoning the infant, and decides to rescue him and deliver him to God's Tower. After a harrowing escape from monsters in the cave, the trio head out toward God's Tower. They eventually meet a man named Darkbeat, and his sister Ibkee. Ibkee has been cursed by a man named Karmine, and Darkbeat has been seeking him for vengeance.

Furthering their adventure with a water-bug named Chester, the group eventually meets a knight named Kalkanor, his sorceress companion Ramal and a mysterious wizard, Gwinladin. Kalkanor believes he is on a divine mission to defeat several evil monsters, he and Knight cross paths many times assisting one another. Knight also meets the mysterious Artemia Cult, who revel in manipulating the populace. Eventually, the group arrives at God's Tower, where they encounter a man named Karmine. Karmine is revealed to be the leader of the Artemia Cult, and is planning to resurrect the evil god Xizan. Kalkanor arrives, and Gwinladin reveals he has been working for Karmine the whole time. Karmine had manipulated Kalkanor into killing the Divine Beasts to weaken the seal on Xizan. Karmine betrays Gwinladin and transforms him into a dragon before beginning his ascent of the tower. Kalkanor is not strong enough to defeat it, thus it falls to Knight. After the battle, Kalkanor asks Knight to face Karmine and save the world. Knight and Baby begin to climb the tower. Upon arriving at the top, they meet Karmine as well as Darkbeat and Ibkee. Karmine had just finished killing the final beast, Baby's mother. Darkbeat attempts to fight Karmine, but he is too powerful. Karmine faces off against Knight, intent on killing Baby and summoning Xizan. Killing Baby, Karmine receives a crystal and summons Xizan. Knight battles Karmine and wins. Celestia, Baby's mother revives Baby and the God's Tower begins to collapse. Baby has Knight ride him and Baby begins to fly from the Tower. In a flash of light the group is blown off course.

Awakening in Picard, the group meet Darkbeat and Ibkee again. They are told of a legendary warrior who will do battle with Xizan. Knight is given the location of several pieces of legendary armor. Upon retrieval, Knight is told that he is the legendary hero, and he faces off against Darwin the ancient legendary hero. Upon his victory Knight is blessed with the legendary armor and the power to defeat Xizan. The group head for the final confrontation. However they are accosted by Karmine once again. However he is distracted by Darkbeat, who successfully seeks his vengeance.

Xizan towers over the group, but after a fierce battle, Baby begins to reseal Xizan. However, Xizan uses a powerful attack that severely weakens the group. Nehani confesses her love for Knight before sacrificing herself to weaken Xizan. Attacking his weakened form, the duo are able to defeat Xizan. Afterwards, Nehani has been revived as a normal person. She and Knight settle down in Orgo with Baby. The game ends with a sepia tone picture of the three of them, happy.

== Development ==
Guardian's Crusade was developed by Tamsoft and was originally released in Japan on September 23, 1998, under the title Knight and Baby. The game was picked up for publication outside Japan by Activision shortly after its launch. Originally titled Guardian Legends, the localized version was eventually changed to Guardian's Crusade because of a similarly named game published by Broderbund.

According to the game's producer and associate producer at Activision, Mika Hayashi and Lars Batista respectively, very few changes were made between the Japanese and North American versions of the game. These differences are mostly found in the intro and title screens, including different music for the opening cinema. The creators took particular pride in the game's Japanese writing and its transition to its English counterpart. "When games are generally translated, the feeling and true meaning of the text in its original form gets lost very easily. We did not want that to happen in Guardian's Crusade," explained the producers. "The original spirit of the story and the humor was kept intact, and since this is not something that is easy to achieve, we are very proud of this accomplishment."

== Reception ==
Reception

Aggregate score
Aggregator	Score
GameRankings	75%

Review scores
Publication	Score
AllGame	2.5/5
CNET Gamecenter	8/10
Electronic Gaming Monthly	5.5/10 (Note: Four critics of Electronic Gaming Monthly gave the game each a score of 5/10, 6/10, 6.5/10, and 4.5/10.)
Famitsu	27/40
Game Informer	8/10
GameFan	82% (Note: Three critics of GameFan gave the game each a score of 77, 85, and 83.)
GamePro	4/5 (Note: GamePro gave the game two 3.5/5 scores for graphics and sound, 4.5/5 for control, and 4/5 for overall fun factor.)
GameRevolution	C−
GameSpot	7.1/10
IGN	8.5/10
Next Generation	4/5
Official U.S. PlayStation Magazine	3/5
RPGFan	85%

The game received favorable reviews according to the review aggregation website GameRankings. Next Generation said, "Considering the competition from more well-known RPG brand names, Activision has done a fine job with Guardian's Crusade by giving the title charm and polish." Esque of RPGFan wrote that it is a "well above average RPG", "extremely true to its roots while giving us some very fresh twists", but that it is "on the easy side". Praise was also given to the graphics, calling the textures in the game world "some of the cleanest I've seen on the PlayStation".

IGN's Francesca Reyes thought that the character designs were "incredibly unique" and "highly stylized throughout". She also gave praise to the breeding tactics, and concluded that Guardian's Crusade is "involving, entertaining, and beautiful". Andrew Vestal of GameSpot called it "charming, sweet and unpretentious", but anyone who expects an "epic confrontation between the forces of good and evil" would be disappointed. Praise was given to the Living Toys feature.

In Japan, Famitsu gave it a score of 27 out of 40.
