= Battle Arena Toshinden 3 =

1996 video game

- North American cover art featuring Rungo (right) and Zola (left)
- Developer: Tamsoft
- Publishers: JP: Takara; NA: Playmates Interactive; EU: Sony Computer Entertainment
- Directors: Shintarō Nakaoka; Shunichi Ōkusa
- Producer: Takayuki Nakano
- Programmer: Tōru Kawashima
- Series: Battle Arena Toshinden
- Platform: PlayStation
- Release: JP: December 27, 1996; NA: March 31, 1997; PAL: March 1997
- Genre: Fighting
- Modes: Single-player, multiplayer

Battle Arena Toshinden 3 is a 1996 fighting game developed by Tamsoft and published by Takara for the PlayStation. Released in December 1996 and globally in March 1997, it serves as the sequel to Battle Arena Toshinden 2. There were changes such as enclosed arenas and altered mechanics. The game also added a large selection of new characters, although most of them are merely palette swapped without their own movesets. The game received mixed reviews, and was followed by a sequel, Toshinden 4.

== Gameplay ==
Whereas Toshinden 2 was largely built upon the first game, Toshinden 3 radically changes the series' gameplay. The arenas are now enclosed, allowing players to launch opponents into the walls and ceilings in order to juggle them with further attacks. The combo system has also been reworked, with every character possessing a preset list of combos. A new type of attack named Soul Bomb has also been introduced. There are more various weapons such as blowpipes and chainsaws.

Toshinden 3's Arcade Mode is much different from the previous two. The opponents that the player faces depend on their selected character. If the player chooses one of the 14 starting fighters or "Heroes", then the computer-controlled opponents will eventually be Organization members while choosing an Organization member will have the player facing off against the "Heroes" themselves. Nagisa and Vermilion serve as the first bosses to their opponents' sides while the specific playing character's sub-boss soon appears next. After that, Sho arrives as the third boss (doubling as the final boss for any Organization member) and once he's defeated, the player will then face off against the Organization leader Abel, who serves as the normal final boss of the game. The former leader of the Organization whom Abel imprisoned, Veil, then later Kayin Amoh's adoptive daughter, Naru can be fought after defeating Abel within the hardest difficulty levels of the game.

The game allows the user to switch between 30 fps and 60 fps. The slower speed gives improved background textures.

=== Regional differences ===
The U.S. and European releases of Toshinden 3 feature several game play differences from the original Japanese release including:

- Blocking high or low is automatic; pressing back blocks both block high and low attacks. In the Japanese version one had to press back and down to block low attacks.
- When hit by a reversal attack, all characters fly the full length of the arena. In the Japanese version, A.I. opponents fly the full length of the arena, but how far the player character flies is determined by his or her weight.
- Practice and Survival modes were added.
- A bug regarding the direction a character flies when hit by attacks that send them flying across the arena, when they were facing away from their attacker, was fixed.
- The forward distance a character moves while being hurt from Vermillion's overdrive was decreased to match the backward distance, to prevent them from slowly moving toward Vermillion during the move.

== Plot ==
With the Secret Society, the sponsors of the two previous Battle Arena Toshinden tournaments, finally defeated, it would seem that the world would now be free from the grip of the conspiratorial heart of the multinational mega-conglomorate, the Gerard Foundation. However, it would soon be known that despite its reign, the Secret Society was a vanguard against an even greater threat. Called by the Secret Society "those who the world must be protected against" and "those who practiced the ancient religions of old", unbeknownst to the Toshinden fighters, a new enemy would now make their move.

In time, those known as the Organization, rose in a strong uprising, taking over the coffers of the Secret Society. A globally spanning cult that dated back beyond even the Secret Society, the Organization centered around the worship a forsaken god of conflict and combat known as Agon Teos. A collective of sacrificial black magic practitioners, cold blooded assassins, slave traffickers, and those who aligned themselves with the savages of human history, the Organization was long opposed since the conception of the Secret Society and the Gerard Foundation in the 16th Century. With the downfall of the Secret Society, the Organization has taken over the Battle Arena Toshinden and seeks to use the tournament for their own ends.

Believing the time has truly come to crusade their beliefs upon the world and fulfill their visions of "a world reborn", the current leader of the Organization, Abel, wishes to use the Battle Arena Toshinden as the basis of a long forsaken ritual of brutality known as "The Legend of the Fighting God", where expert and master fighters deemed "the strongest" throughout the world are summoned and forced to fight to the death until the last is deemed the winner, who then will be sacrificed, body and soul, with the blood of the past fighters, to embody Agon Teos's divine presence, allowing Agon Teos to physically manifest, granting upon them ultimate power and eternal youth to rule the world with. Finding by Vermilion's intel that the Toshinden fighters of the most recent tournaments are those deemed "the strongest", Abel sends ultimatums of participation and assassins and headhunters upon them to know of his demands, else the Organization will forever hunt them down.

With the original Legend of the Fighting God ritual having proven unsuccessful in the past, Abel then sought out Master, the ruler and leader of the Secret Society, learning from experiments and divinations that only those "pure of heart" will be able to behold Agon Teos's immense spiritual power. However, the Master and his closest follower, Uranus, have claimed to have disappeared since the end of the last Toshinden. At the same time, a young boy who managed to fight his way out of one of the Organization's main facilities caught his attention. Believing this teenage boy to be "the pure one", Abel realizes the prophecy's insight that "the pure one" will only follow "the strongest". Knowing that they have no other choice, Abel awaits for all of his marks to enter and meet their end at the Organization's hands.

On the Toshinden fighters' end, all of them learn of the Organization's hunt for their sacrifice to their fighting god of evil. Able to fend off their attackers, Eiji Shinjo decisively makes a stand against the evil Organization, inspiring the rest of the fighters to do the same. With allies old and new and the fate of the world in the balance, the fighters are caught up in the fight of their lives as the plot concludes with the death-defying third Battle Arena Toshinden potentially being their final battle.

== Characters ==
12 characters return from Battle Arena Toshinden 2, joining 20 new characters for a total of 32.

Returning characters:

- Eiji Shinjo
- Kayin Amoh
- Sofia
- Rungo Iron
- Mondo
- Duke B. Rambert
- Ellis
- Gaia
- Sho Shinjo
- Tracy
- Chaos
- Vermilion

New characters:

- David
- Shizuku Fuji
- Nagisa Iwashiro
- Bayhou - uses non-returning character Fo's moveset
- Leon - uses Eiji's moveset
- Ten Count - uses Kayin's moveset
- Zola - uses Sofia moveset
- Adam - uses Rungo's moveset
- Cuiling - uses Bayhou's moveset
- Toujin - uses Mondo's moveset
- Balga - uses Duke's moveset
- Atahua - uses Ellis's moveset
- Tau - uses Gaia's moveset
- Rachael - uses Tracy's moveset
- Schultz - uses Chaos's moveset
- Judgement - uses David's moveset
- Miss Til - uses Shizuku's moveset
- Abel - the "final" boss
- Veil - the true final boss, appearing only in the higher difficulties after the defeating Abel
- Naru Amoh - secret boss

== Reception ==
=== Commercial ===
Toshinden 3 had sold at least 95,019 copies in Japan, only a fraction of the number sold by the previous game. In the United States it sold 50,952 copies, less than half the number achieved by Battle Arena Toshinden 2.

=== Critical ===
Reception

Aggregate score
Aggregator	Score
GameRankings	62% (PS1)

Review scores
Publication	Score
Edge	6/10
Electronic Gaming Monthly	7.125/10
GameSpot	7.6/10
IGN	6.3/10
PlayStation Official Magazine – UK	7/10

Jeff Gerstmann, reviewing the game for GameSpot, commented that whereas Toshinden 2 was a simple graphical upgrade which retained the flaws of the original game, Toshinden 3 genuinely advanced the series. He cited the single-round combat, super moves, enclosed arenas, and character unlocking, and concluded, "If you were one of the many who thought Toshinden was neat, but far too dull, this game may have what it takes to turn your viewpoint around." In contrast, Sushi-X of Electronic Gaming Monthly saw Battle Arena Toshinden 3 as a rush-job, noting how quickly it had come out after Toshinden 2. While he agreed that the character unlocking is a good feature, he argued that the enclosed arenas in effect sacrificed the strategic element of ring-outs for the lesser trade-off of improved frame rate. He and his three co-reviewers all commented that the game is flashy but shallow, with unbalanced characters and overly easy-to-execute super moves.

Scary Larry of GamePro gave Battle Arena Toshinden 3 a score of 3.5 out of 5 within all four categories (control, sound, graphics, and fun factor), stating that while the game was better than Toshinden 2, "it's still not good enough to be classed with Tekken, Virtua Fighter 2, or even Tobal No. 1." His critiques included the game's simple gameplay, one-button special moves, slowdown which affected the game's continuity, and that "the fighters, although unique in appearance, are too similar in their fighting styles." He concluded that Toshinden 3 wasn't a bad game, but couldn't compete with the other fighting games available for the PlayStation. Official UK PlayStation Magazine with a score of 7 out of 10 commented that sound and graphics are "marvellous", but that the game is only "marginally" better than its predecessor and that it doesn't stack up to better PlayStation fighters available on the market. IGN in its review wrote that despite having improvements, the first Battle Arena Toshinden from 1995 "looks better" and that the game plays "choppy" and not as good as Soul Blade or Tobal 2. It did give some praise to how the power moves look. Edge wrote that "it's clear that the emphasis remains on scrubby pyrotechnics and link-anything combos rather than balance or finesse", but concluded that it is "rather more fun" than some would claim.
