= AbalaBurn =

1998 video game

AbalaBurn: A Battle Legend of Astterica
- Developer: Tamsoft
- Publisher: Takara
- Directors: Hiroaki Furukawa; Miho Furukawa
- Producer: Hirohisa Sato
- Platform: PlayStation
- Release: JP: August 20, 1998
- Genres: Fighting, action-adventure
- Modes: Single-player, multiplayer

AbalaBurn: A Battle Legend of Astterica (Japanese: アバラバーン) is a 3D fighting adventure video game for the PlayStation developed by Tamsoft and published by Takara, the same team behind the Battle Arena Toshinden series. It includes fighting, beat 'em up and platform elements.

== Gameplay ==
There are two modes in AbalaBurn: the arcade mode consists of regular one-on-one battles against a computer opponent. The second is the story mode, a quest where the player roams around in a fantasy-themed 3D world and fights opponents. It includes items, equipment and boss battles.

== Plot and characters ==
The story is about the legend of Lemuria who will grant one wish to the fighter who finds eight crystals and defeats their opponents. The playable characters in the game are: Blood, Pooly, Ariel, Kleude, Bian, Rose, Aquila, and Nate.

== Reception ==
Famitsu gave AbalaBurn 20 out of 40 points. The reviewers commented that "the attempt to fight in a fighting action style from a rear-view perspective is interesting", but were critical of the controls.
