= SteamGear Mash =

1995 video game

- Developer: Tamsoft
- Publisher: Takara
- Director: Akihiko Kimura
- Producer: Takayuki Nakano
- Designers: Hideki Kobayashi; Shintarō Nakaoka
- Programmers: Hideki Matsumoto; Toshimi Matsumoto
- Artists: Aki Kobayashi; Kō Ogura; Mitsutoshi Nomura
- Composers: Fumio Tanabe; Makoto Mukai; Yasuhiro Nakano
- Platform: Sega Saturn
- Release: JP: 29 September 1995
- Genres: Action, platform, run and gun
- Mode: Single-player

SteamGear Mash (Note: Japanese: スチームギア★マッシュ, Hepburn: StēmGiya Masshu) is a 1995 action run and gun video game developed by Tamsoft and published by Takara for the Sega Saturn. The game received mainly positive reception for its visually bright graphics.

== Gameplay ==
Gameplay screenshot

SteamGear Mash is a game featuring three-dimensional play in 3/4 isometric perspective, and solving puzzles. The player may use weapons including bombs and punches to clear stages. The levels are multilayered, structured in 2D planes in a 3D cube-shaped space. There are seven levels in the game of which two are shmups.

The game, in its presentation and plot, is said to have many elements related to childhood and innocence.

== Plot ==
A scientist develops a robot, Mash, for his daughter, Mina. The two quickly become good friends. However, Gash, who watches from his space station, grows jealous of their affection and wishes the same affection for himself. Gash steals Mina, leading to Mash going on the journey to rescue her.

== Development and release ==
SteamGear Mash was Takara's first game on the Sega Saturn. A European release was planned for 1996, to be published by Ocean Software.

== Reception ==
Reception

Review scores
Publication	Score
Consoles +	89%
Famitsu	26/40
GameFan	269/300
Mega Fun	69%
Next Generation	2/5
Video Games (DE)	54%
Mega Force	80%
Sega Pro	84%
Sega Saturn Magazine (JP)	6.33/10
Ultimate Future Games	47%

Famitsu rated it 26 out of 40. Readers of the Japanese Sega Saturn Magazine voted to give the game a 7.1546 out of 10 score, ranking at the number 609 spot.

As for import reviews in the west, Sega Pro called it a "cutesy platformer with plenty of unique features". GameFan's three reviewers variously gave praise to the game's "rich colors", "supreme attention to detail", the variety of weapons, music, and enemies. One however noted that although the locales were "beautiful", there were "no parallex or BG animation" in the areas.

On a more negative note, Next Generation reviewed SteamGear Mash, rating it two stars out of five, stating that "It's doubtful, in the end, with its cartoon-style graphics and brightly colored backgrounds, that this particular title will make much of an impact in the US."
