= Bleach Rebirth of Souls =

2025 fighting video game

- Developer: Tamsoft
- Publisher: Bandai Namco Entertainment
- Series: Bleach
- Platforms: PlayStation 4; PlayStation 5; Xbox Series X/S; Windows
- Release: March 21, 2025
- Genre: Arena fighter
- Mode: Multiplayer; single-player

Bleach Rebirth of Souls is a 2025 fighting game developed by Tamsoft and published by Bandai Namco Entertainment for the PlayStation 4, PlayStation 5, Xbox Series S, and PC via Steam. The Japanese rock artist MIYAVI provided the game's main theme song "Die for Love".

== Gameplay ==
The game plays on a three-dimensional fighting plain, but characters move back and forth in two dimensions. The fighting has a counter system similar to rock-paper-scissors rules where an attack will be strong against one attack type but weak against others. The goal is to deplete an opponent's Konpaku (lives) to 0 which can be done by performing a Kikkon move once the opponent's health is at a critical state. There are also specialized moves that can be used at the cost of the Reishi gauge, which is filled up as the player's character fights.

=== Playable characters ===
Base game

- Ichigo Kurosaki (Shikai, Bankai, and Final Getsuga Tensho)
- Rukia Kuchiki
- Uryū Ishida
- Yasutora "Chad" Sado
- Renji Abarai
- Kisuke Urahara
- Yoruichi Shihōin
- Sosuke Aizen
- Genryūsai Shigekuni Yamamoto
- Soi Fon
- Gin Ichimaru
- Byakuya Kuchiki
- Sajin Komamura
- Shunsui Kyōraku
- Kaname Tōsen
- Tōshirō Hitsugaya
- Kenpachi Zaraki
- Mayuri Kurotsuchi
- Izuru Kira
- Shuhei Hisagi
- Rangiku Matsumoto
- Ikkaku Madarame
- Kaien Shiba
- Shinji Hirako
- Nelliel Tu Odelschwanck
- Ulquiorra Cifer
- Grimmjow Jaegerjaquez
- Nnoitra Gilga
- Szayelaporro Grantz
- Tier Halibel
- Coyote Stark

DLC

- Ichigo Kurosaki (Thousand-Year Blood War)
- Retsu Unohana
- Ichibe Hyōsube
- Yhwach

== Story ==
The story covers most of Bleach as a whole, going from the beginning of the story in the Substitute Soul Reaper story arc through the very end of the Fake Karakura Town story arc with Ichigo's final battle against Aizen. Each fight or story section is assigned to a different marker in a map based on that given arc. The game has five different main maps for the five primary arcs the game covers. The missions have extra conditions that have extra rewards including secret missions that expand on the Bleach universe through the lens of characters besides Ichigo and moments that add extra dialogue and cutscenes.

== Development ==
The game was initially announced over eight months before the game was released, on July 5, 2024. Leading up to the game's release, most weeks would have a trailer showcasing each of the 33 playable characters. The game was released globally on March 21, 2025.

== Reception ==
Reception

Aggregate score
Aggregator	Score
OpenCritic	47% recommend

Review scores
Publication	Score
Gamekult	60%
HobbyConsolas	65%
IGN	80%
Jeuxvideo.com	70%
Push Square	60%
The Games Machine (UK)	78%

The game received "mixed or average" reviews according to review aggregator Metacritic. IGN gave the game a 7/10 and stated that Tamsoft's effort to make the combat more complex was able to save it from being a "fly by night" fighter. GamersRD stated that the game's lack of game modes may not fill the needs of demanding players.

=== Sales ===
The PlayStation 5 version of the game sold 6,079 physical copies in its first week in Japan, debuting at #8 on the sales charts, while the PlayStation 4 version sold 2,182 copies, debuting at #18.
