= Natsuiro High School: Seishun Hakusho =

2015 video game

Natsuiro Haisukuru: Seishun Hakusho
- Cover art (PS4 version)
- Developer: Tamsoft
- Publisher: D3 Publisher
- Producer: Nobuyuki Okajima
- Platforms: PlayStation 3, PlayStation 4
- Release: JP: June 4, 2015
- Genres: Stealth, Action-adventure
- Mode: Single-player

Natsuiro High School: Seishun Hakusho (Note: Full name: 夏色ハイスクル★青春白書〜転校初日のオレが幼馴染と再会したら報道部員にされていて激写少年の日々はスクープ大連発でイガイとモテモテなのに何故かマイメモリーはパンツ写真ばっかりという現実と向き合いながら考えるひと夏の島の学園生活と赤裸々な恋の行方。〜, Natsuiro Haisukuru Seishun Hakusho ~Tenkō Shonichi no Ore ga Osananajimi to Saikai shitara Hōdōbuin ni Sarete ite Gekisha Shōnen no Hibi wa Sukūpu Dairenpatsu de Igai to Motemote nanoni Nazeka Mai Memori wa Pantsu Shashin Bakkari to iu Genjitsu to Mukiainagara Kangaeru Hitonatsu no Shima no Gakuen Seikatsu to Sekirarana Koi no Yukue., lit. "Summertime High School: A Young Man's Notes—How a New Exchange Student Like Myself Ran Into His Childhood Friend on the School Tour, Then for Some Reason Became Super-Popular with the Girls for His Daily Scoops on the School Photography Club Even Though He Only Takes Panty Shots, and What He Thinks as He Goes on Dates During His Summer of Island School Life.") is an open world video game released on June 4, 2015, by D3 Publisher for PlayStation 3 and PlayStation 4. D3 Publisher officially describes the game as an "open world high school love adventure".

The title of the game translates to "Summertime High School: A Young Man's Notes—How a New Exchange Student Like Myself Ran Into His Childhood Friend on the School Tour, Then for Some Reason Became Super-Popular with the Girls for His Daily Scoops on the School Photography Club Even Though He Only Takes Panty Shots, and What He Thinks as He Goes on Dates During His Summer of Island School Life." It holds the Guinness World Record for longest video game title.

== Gameplay ==
The player assumes the role of a high school boy on the fictional island of Yumegashima (夢ヶ島), Japan. The player is able to explore the island. On many occasions, the player will find people that will give them quests, for example to find lost possessions or assist with interviews for the school's journalism club. The game also includes a photo mode, which allows for upskirt shots of female NPCs to be taken, but if the player is seen doing so, they will be reported to the police, initiating a pursuit phase, where the player has to evade the police. If caught, the player will be taken into custody in a police station or the school counselor's office, depending on where the player was caught.

== Development ==
Natsuiro Haisukuru: Seishun Hakusho was announced in November 20, 2014's Weekly Famitsu. About a week later, D3 Publisher released details about the main outline and four of its heroines. In the December 4, 2014's Weekly Famitsu they revealed three new female characters. On December 10, 2014, D3 Publisher uploaded the first trailer on their official YouTube channel, revealing the theme song "Natsuiro Butterfly" (夏色バタフライ☆) by Megu & Tamaki. In February 2015, the release date, thirteen new characters and their voice actors were revealed. An eight-minute trailer was released on May 15, 2015. Natsuiro Haisukuru Seishun Hakusho was inspired by action role-playing open world game The Elder Scrolls V: Skyrim. The game's producer is Nobuyuki Okajima.

== Music ==
The opening theme is "Natsuiro Butterfly" (夏色バタフライ☆; literally "Summertime Butterfly"), while its ending theme is "Kioku no Naka no Regret" (記憶の中のリグレット; literally "The Memories of Regret"), both by Megu & Tamaki. The two songs were released alongside the game on June 4, 2015 on a double A-side single.

== Reception and sales ==
Reception

Review score
Publication	Score
Famitsu	30/40

Reviewers from the Japanese video game magazine Famitsu scored Natsuiro Haisukuru: Seishun Hakusho a 30 out of 40, based on individual scores of 8, 8, 8, and 6. The PlayStation 4 and PlayStation 3 versions respectively debuted at number three (13,868 units) and number 10 (6,772 units) on Japanese sales charts during their release week. The PlayStation 4 version topped the Japanese PlayStation Network digital download sales chart during its release week, while the PlayStation 3 version debuted at number four.
