= Battle Arena Toshinden 2 =

1995 fighting video game

- North American arcade flyer
- Developer: Tamsoft: Kinesoft (Windows 95)
- Publishers: Takara: Arcade; WW: Capcom PlayStation; JP: Takara; NA: Playmates Interactive; EU: Sony Computer Entertainment Saturn; JP: Takara; WW: Sega PC; JP: Gamebank; JP: Cyberfront Corporation; NA: THQ / Fujitsu Interactive; EU: Gamebank / Funsoft PS3/PSP/PS Vita (Plus version); JP: Tamsoft
- Director: Shintarō Nakaoka
- Producer: Nobuyuki Okude
- Programmer: Hiroaki Furukawa
- Composer: Yasuhiro Nakano
- Series: Battle Arena Toshinden
- Engine: Hyper Solid
- Platforms: Arcade, PlayStation, Sega Saturn, Windows 95
- Release: Arcade: JP: November 24, 1995; WW: December 1995; PlayStation: JP: December 29, 1995; NA: May 23, 1996; PAL: July 12, 1996; Windows: NA: April 1998; Saturn (Toshinden URA): JP: September 27, 1996; NA: November 14, 1996; PAL: February 6, 1997
- Genre: Fighting
- Modes: Single-player, multiplayer
- Arcade system: Sony ZN-1

Battle Arena Toshinden 2, or Toshinden 2 (闘神伝2) in Japan, is a 1995 fighting video game developed by Tamsoft and published by Takara. Unlike the original Battle Arena Toshinden which was only for home systems, this sequel was originally a coin-operated arcade game for the Sony ZN-1 hardware, released in November 1995 and distributed by Capcom before its port to PlayStation shortly afterwards. It was also ported to Windows.

Toshinden 2 featured changes in mechanics for faster gameplay and introduced the Overdrive meter. New starting characters Chaos and Tracy were added, while the former boss Gaia is demoted, having lost his armor. Critical reception to the game was mainly positive, although critics noted that both the gameplay and graphics made too little advancement over the original game. An updated PlayStation version subtitled Plus was released in Japan featuring tweaks and graphical improvements. Battle Arena Toshinden URA (full title Ultimate Revenge Attack) is a Sega Saturn specific sequel to Toshinden S / Remix, with new characters, a new story, and other exclusive content and tweaks compared to Battle Arena Toshinden 2. It was followed by a sequel, Battle Arena Toshinden 3.

== Gameplay ==
Screenshot on PlayStation of Eiji vs. Tracy; the game introduced new Overdrive gauges

The core gameplay remains unchanged from the original Battle Arena Toshinden, but the game does include a simple combo system and an 'Overdrive' gauge. The 3D movement was also altered to create slightly better balance in battle; differentiating from the first game, dodge rolling will no longer make the character temporarily immune to the opponent's attack (in the first game, it was possible for a character to dodge straight through even the most deadly attacks). The ability to attack opponents on the ground has also been added. As in the first game, a player falling out of the ring will result in a ring out, only this time, if both players fall out of the ring at the same time, the one who falls out last will be declared the winner.

== Plot ==
=== Battle Arena Toshinden 2 ===
At the climax of the last Toshinden Tournament, the final battle between Eiji Shinjo and the tournament's sponsor, Gaia, was suddenly interrupted. With this spectacle of the underworld cut short, that would be the last of the latest of the hotly anticipated Battle Arena Toshinden. Only the participants, and the hosts of the Battle Arena Toshinden, the Secret Society, really knew what happened that day.

Gaia, one of the touted "Divine Four" executives of the Secret Society and the Gerard Foundation, sought to use the Battle Arena Toshinden to rally a team of supporters and fighters to his cause to overthrow the Secret Society's ruler, the Master. Having witnessed Master's and the Gerard Foundation's depravity into merely controlling the world with an iron fist than its goals to defend the world from ancient and enigmatic long time enemies deemed "those whom the world must be protected against", Gaia sought to fell Master before the situation would spiral out of control.

Instead of making the Battle Arena Toshinden its tradition of a brutal competition of life or death between assassins and killers, Gaia ruled out the intentional death of all participants, and summoned skilled fighters deemed "those of the everyday world" to fight to show their martial arts skill in the ring. Now more palpable and lively to its viewers, Gaia would be able to establish the grounds of capital and support by sponsors upon building his team of fighters. However, at the end of his Toshinden, Gaia failed to convince any of the Toshinden warriors to his side, angered by his coercion or mystified by his offers. Furthermore, his long time rival and heated enemy, the Secret Society "Divine Four" executive Uranus, lead the arrest against him, having figured out Gaia's mutiny and disclosed his betrayal to Master. Branded a traitor, and marked for death, Gaia was forced to escape in exile by the Secret Society.

Having been a year since the last Battle Arena Toshinden, the mysterious Uranus begins their plans. Sending invitations to all of last year's participants and those deemed imminent threats, the invitations are filled with threats of ruinous penalties of absence, demanding their participation. Only by returning to this jealously kept event of the underworld, the Toshinden warriors and its viewers may find the truth they are looking for.

=== Battle Arena Toshinden URA ===
Sometime after the events of the first Toshinden game, a police scientist named Ronron creates an android fighter intended for law enforcement, its name being the Replicant. To make the android as strong as possible, its fighting abilities are patterned off the world's greatest fighter, Sho Shinjo. The prototype is later stolen just before it can be fully completed. Within time, someone begins murdering famous fighters around the world in a surprising yet shocking manner. With no evidence as to who is behind these murders, the Toshinden fighters grow suspicious of each other. Meanwhile, a mysterious man, known only as Ripper, is seeking Sho Shinjo as his sister (believed to have been Cupido) has disappeared without a trace and Ripper himself believes that Sho may have killed her from within the past. Every lead Ripper finds takes him to the scene of one of these mysterious murders, leading to him becoming the prime suspect in a shrouded conspiracy that seems to be surrounding him and the rest of the Toshinden fighters.

== Characters ==
All previous characters (PlayStation version) return in Toshinden 2:

- Eiji Shinjo - With his duel against Gaia interrupted, and his chance to again meet his brother Sho dashed, Eiji could only, if bitterly, accept the conclusion of the turn of events that transpired. With his invitation to the next Battle Arena Toshinden reinvigorating his fighting spirit, Eiji heads out again to its battles to truly sate his wish to be victor of the Battle Arena Toshinden properly.
- Kayin Amoh - Learning that Sho was the killer of his adoptive father Amoh, his grief leads him to kill one of his more rewarding bounties in frustration, only to learn his mark had a daughter and that he was hired by the Secret Society. Left with a bitter taste in his mouth that nearly ends his friendship with Eiji, Kayin adopts his mark's now orphaned daughter, Naru, in hopes to atone for his actions and find a way out of his life of unending fighting. With Naru captured with him declining to participate, Kayin enters to stop the Secret Society and rescue Naru.
- Sofia - Unsuccessful in interrogating Gaia of her mysterious past and its ties with the Secret Society, Sofia is forced to leave the affair, leaving her with more questions than answers. Hearing of another significant member of the Secret Society having been in the subjects of her mysterious past, her invitation allows her the chance to pursue another lead and hope to cure their affliction.
- Rungo Iron - Mystified and betrayed at his now estranged friend having kidnapped his family and nearly made him lost his job by the uranium deposit discovery incident to lure him to the Battle Arena Toshinden than to ask him for his help, Rungo cannot shake his conscience telling him that Gaia's trials of combat had a genuine purpose. With his invitation now threatening his family more severely, Rungo answers the call and seeks to meet Gaia again for answers yet to be known.
- Fo Fai - His lust for bloodshed unfulfilled, Fo has returned to the next Toshinden Tournament upon his premature defeat. However, his behavior upon his arrival is most unusual this time around, being more joyful and loose than composed and cunning. What is on the mind of this feared veteran assassin?
- Mondo - His clients demanding more information, Mondo's patience is just as pressed, shameful at his failure to succeed in the last Battle Arena Toshinden against his more challenging opponents. Before his clientele can even demand him to listen, Mondo rushes forward towards the next Toshinden Tournament- And guarantees his results will be now attained his way.
- Duke B. Rambert - Bitter at his loss against Eiji yet again and the opportunity to triumph and restore his name in the world of weapons fighting, Duke's motivations are now different. Uranus's name in his invitation invites upon him pressing distress and leads him to attend- What is his ties to the mysterious Uranus?
- Ellis - The reveal of Gaia being her father during her opportune duel against him shocked Ellis in disbelief, driving her to forfeit her match, overwhelmed. Continuing her sojourning life in the circus, Ellis states that she has no attachments to that man. But as her invitation arrives, and as her father's life is threatened, a new undercurrent of emotions towards a man she swears coldness to tells otherwise, as she enters the next Battle Arena Toshinden.
- Gaia - Retreating to a life of solitude, having failed his mission, Gaia has discarded his Armor Basara, hoping to train to attain strength for a more direct approach. Anticipating Uranus's search for him now tracking him down, he is now ready to show how he was able to become an executive of the Secret Society by combat.
- Sho Shinjo (hidden boss) - The man known as the "Etranger" and feared throughout the underworld as the "Blood Drenched Red Angel", again stands afar, watching the next Toshinden unfold. He again awaits a new challenger who can meet his expectations.

The new characters are:

- Chaos - A Sri Lankan man being one of the executives of the Secret Society, Chaos is a near psychotic madman with an abnormal fighting style. He is tasked to kill Gaia for his mutiny. Sofia seeks to know of how he came to be and his condition. He uses a scythe and the Genbu Shield.
- Tracy - A feisty American policewoman of the New York City Police Department, Tracy is led to participate in the Battle Arena Toshinden due to her pursuing a lead on a cold case regarding Gaia's late wife and newborn son. She fights with twin tonfas.
- Uranus (sub-boss) - One of the executives of the Secret Society, feared as the 'angel of death' for their ruthlessness and propensity for secretiveness to those outside of the Secret Society. Uses the Suzaku Bow.
- Master (final boss) - The leader of the Secret Society, Master is a mysterious youth whose psychic powers allows the Secret Society and the Gerard Foundation the ability to preempt all events in the world, allowing them to reign supreme over Earth. Now a ruthless tyrant, Master seeks to be rid of anyone that stands in the way of their plans. Utilizes psychic powers with a broadsword that can be summoned at will.
- Vermilion (hidden final boss) - A mysterious gunfighter, the shadowy individual known as Vermilion is a menacing entity who also seeks challengers who can meet his expectations. He uses a long barrelled shotgun and a revolver.

Toshinden URA contains four exclusive characters: Ripper, Ronron, Replicant and Wolf, that replace four of the original version's characters: Gaia, Chaos, Uranus, and Master.

== Development and release ==
Detailed backgrounds were created in the game but it came at a cost: the backgrounds are layers of 2D parallex scrolling (like Tekken 2) instead of the more 3D backgrounds that the original Battle Arena Toshinden had. This was at least quoted for a previewed version of the game.

Takara expected an arcade-first release in October or November 1995. Capcom picked up the game exclusively for its arcade release, making it their first 3D fighter before Star Gladiator and Street Fighter EX, both of which were developed in-house on the same hardware as Battle Arena Toshinden 2.

Though based on the original version of Battle Arena Toshinden 2, Battle Arena Toshinden URA has altered gameplay, making it feel notably different. It also has all new arenas, a new story, a different CG intro, new rendered cinemas, and four exclusive new characters (Ripper, Ronron, Replicant and Wolf) that replace four of the original version's characters (Gaia, Chaos, Uranus and Master). Though within the game "URA" is an acronym, the word "Ura" also has combat connotations in Japanese.

Toshinden 2 was ported to the PC by American developer Kinesoft. It is a Windows port of the PlayStation version with arcade graphical fidelity, the ability to play the game in higher resolutions and some additional options, such as the ability to remap all the controls (the PlayStation version only allows the remapping of the shoulder buttons). Unlike the original PlayStation version, it also saves unlocked characters, settings and results, but the introductory movie was removed.

=== Book bonus disc ===
Like the first Toshinden game, Toshinden 2 had an official strategy guide book released which came with a bonus CD-ROM for PlayStation. This disc contains a demo of computer vs computer battles and also the character Eiji in a school uniform outfit, Ellis in a sailor skirt, Sofia in a translucent form, and with Ellis acting as the voice referee. The disc can be swapped with the full game to implement them.

=== Soundtrack ===
Yasuhiro Nakano and Fumio Tanabe composed the soundtrack, with Yasuhiro Itoh credited for the opening theme. The music in the PlayStation version is enhanced and differs from the arcade version's sound. The official soundtrack CD album, consisting of the enhanced tracks, was released by Sony Records on April 21, 1996. An album with arranged tracks, Power to the Techno Groove, was released by NEC Avenue on November 21, 1996. The arrangers were Dota Ando, Yoshiyuki Ito, Naoyuki Horiko, Kiyoshi Yoshikawa, and Hiroshi Iizuka.

== Reception ==
Reception

Review scores
Publication	Score
Consoles +	92% (PS)
Computer and Video Games	62% (PS)
Electronic Gaming Monthly	8.125 / 10 (PS); 4.5/10, 5/10, 4/10, 5/10 (SAT)
Famitsu	30 / 40
Game Informer	6 / 10 (SAT); 8.5 / 10 (PS)
GameFan	246 / 300 (PS)
GameSpot	5.6 / 10 (SAT)
Hyper	4/5 (ARC)
IGN	6 / 10
Next Generation	4/5 (PS); 3/5 (ARC); 1/5 (SAT)
Super Game Power	4.8/5 (PS)
Maximum	3/5 (PS)
Sega Saturn Magazine	60% (SAT)
Intelligent Gamer's Fusion	A− (PC)
Game Players	83% (PS)

=== Commercial performance ===
In Japan, Game Machine magazine listed Battle Arena Toshinden 2 on their February 1, 1996 issue as being the tenth most successful arcade game of the month.

On the PlayStation, the game sold 435,712 units in Japan. In the United States, it sold 133,491 units, for a total of 569,203 units sold in Japan and the United States.

Battle Arena Toshinden URA for the Saturn sold 13,432 units during its first week in Japan. This adds up to a combined total of at least 582,635 units sold for home consoles in Japan and the United States.

=== Reviews ===
In reviews for Battle Arena Toshinden 2, critics generally commented that the game is good but shows little improvement over its predecessor and fails to measure up to marketplace competitors like Virtua Fighter 2 and Tekken 2.

The four reviewers of Electronic Gaming Monthly had a more positive reaction than most, praising the graphics and the new character Vermillion, while remarking that the game is not as good as Virtua Fighter 2. A reviewer for Next Generation similarly said that though Battle Arena Toshinden 2 addresses many of the complaints made about the original game and has impressive light-sourcing effects, backgrounds, and overdrive super moves, it still fails to measure up to Virtua Fighter 2: "The depth of gameplay and complexity of the strategy isn't there, and the speed and smoothness of VF2 far outweighs Toshinden 2's light-sourcing and moving backgrounds. ... The initial 'wow' of the first Toshinden ... is gone and what's left is a fighting game that isn't deep, fast, or balanced enough to compete with the best." The magazine's later review of the arcade version was still less enthusiastic. The reviewer contended that the Toshinden series is not well-suited to the arcade environment, and criticized the fact that the arcade version is near-identical to the PlayStation version, since standards are higher in arcades.

Hyper magazine, by contrast, selected as its pick of the month and said, "Although already a favorite on the PlayStation, releasing the long-awaited second game in the arcades seems to give the game extra credibility points." They reported that among interviewed players, "the general consensus seemed to be that the arcade version IS better, i.e. smoother graphic flow, better gameplay, you know, it just feels better." Game On! USA praised the "smoothed out and speeded up" gameplay compared to the first game.

Maximum's Rich Leadbetter argued that the changes from the original game, particularly the new characters Chaos and Vermillion, made the game better, but also felt that they were insufficient, particularly in light of the graphical advances PlayStation games had made since the original Toshinden was released. He added that compared to smoother 60 frames per second gameplay offered by rivals, Toshinden 2 looked "jerky". He concluded by advising PlayStation owners to wait for Tekken 2 instead. GamePro similarly described the game as "more of the same." While the reviewer stated the graphics are better than the first game, he derided the game's lack of intelligent fighting technique, particularly that combos are very limited and the fights essentially boil down to trading special attacks. IGN stated that the game's animations were not very smooth and the camera made gameplay challenging. Final comments on the game stated that although the game wasn't necessarily bad, it wasn't exactly outstanding either.

Patrick Baggatta of Game Players felt that the backgrounds were "fantastic" and specified Duke's, Rungo's and Sofia's stages as examples. He further thought that the character designs were "pretty damn nice", and also gave praise to the new bosses, noting Master's "lightning-fast attacks" and labeling Uranus as one of the "most attractive" characters graphically in any fighting game. While calling it a good game, he wrote that the game "still suffers to some degree from choppy animations and occasionally sluggish controls" found in the original Toshinden. Another of the magazine's editors, Mike, wrote: "Toshinden was never in the league of a Street Fighter or Virtua Fighter in terms of gameplay. It was more like a Mortal Kombat. The second one doesn't manage to wow like the first and, even though gameplay elements were added, it just isn't balanced or deep enough to rank with the classics. That doesn't mean BAT 2 is not an excellent fighting game,".

Intelligent Gamer's Fusion's Jer Horwitz reviewed the PC version of the game. He noted that the faster play and new moves made the game fun, and further praised character designs and for having "The best 3-D artwork attempted on a home game to date". He called the music "excellent" just as the first game but was critical of how it restarts every round and hence can't be enjoyed as it should. Also criticised were "camera problems" and "low-quality background art", both as downgrades compared to the original Toshinden.

=== Reviews for Battle Arena Toshinden URA ===
Battle Arena Toshinden URA met with overwhelmingly negative reviews. Critics remarked that despite the game running in high resolution, the enhanced textures over the PlayStation game cause URA to suffer from a generally muddy and choppy appearance. Several reviewers called the new character Ronron one of the worst fighting game characters ever created. Many critics also began to find serious problems in the basic Toshinden gameplay with this installment. Reviewers complained that the game was riddled with a plethora of game breaking glitches, such as computer controlled opponents running and/or falling out of the ring on their own, poor collision detection in some instances and serious character balancing issues, which were so broken that some characters had certain special attacks that provided instant knockouts even with a full life bar (such as performing Kayin's Scottish Moon while both combatants are in the air or Mondo's Goriki Fujin), resulting in some matches lasting mere seconds, while rendering overdrive and desperation moves pointless. Jeff Gerstmann stated in GameSpot that "Though URA has the most features of any Toshinden release to date, it's still like playing the previous Toshinden games. That is to say, the control is sluggish, the combo system is weak, and the special moves are dull." Dan Hsu similarly wrote in Electronic Gaming Monthly, "I look at these games as a novelty now, because it's more flash than technique. The fighters do not have a lot of moves available, and the ones they do have are pretty boring." A reviewer for Next Generation commented, "Any time you can beat the entire game on the hardest difficulty by mashing on one button - with your eyes closed - there's something very wrong." GamePro found it very similar to the previous Saturn entry in the series, Battle Arena Toshinden Remix, and concluded, "Simply put, URA is just more of a bad thing." They gave it a 3.0 out of 5 or lower in every category, including a 0.5 for funfactor. Lee Nutter noted in Sega Saturn Magazine that the game had been given an unusually high level of PAL optimization, but concluded that the mediocre graphics and lack of depth in the gameplay made it a poor buy, particularly with Fighters Megamix soon to be released in PAL regions.

== Toshinden 2 Plus ==
Toshinden 2 Plus 闘神伝2プラス
- Developer: Tamsoft
- Publisher: JP: Takara
- Platform: PlayStation
- Release: JP: August 9, 1996
- Genre: Fighting
- Modes: Single-player, multiplayer

Toshinden 2 Plus is a version of Battle Arena Toshinden 2 released only in Japan for the PlayStation on The Best range (equivalent to the Greatest Hits and Platinum ranges in North America and Europe). It features enhanced graphics, improved control and tweaked CPU AI. It also makes some balancing tweaks to the characters' attacks. An option to save results, option settings and unlocked characters to a memory card was also added.

This version was re-released on the Japanese PlayStation Store by Tamsoft under license of Takara Tomy for PlayStation 3, PlayStation Portable and PlayStation Vita on November 22, 2016.
