= Dream Club Zero =

2011 video game

Dream Club Zero (Dream C Club Zero)
- Xbox 360 cover art of Dream Club Zero
- Developer: Tamsoft
- Publisher: D3 Publisher
- Platforms: Xbox 360, PlayStation Vita, PlayStation 3
- Release: JP: January 27, 2011
- Genre: Dating sim
- Mode: Single-player

Dream Club Zero (ドリームクラブゼロ, Dream C Club Zero) is a dating sim video game developed by Tamsoft and published by D3 Publisher for the Xbox 360. The game is a prequel to Dream Club and basically a Japanese hostess game where the player gets drunk with the hostess while trying to gain her favor. The game was released on January 27, 2011. It was released on PlayStation Vita on December 17, 2011 as Dream C Club Zero Portable. It is rated D by CERO, due to featuring more sexual themes than the previous game, such as erotic eating.

== Gameplay ==
The player's goal of the game is to achieve a happy ending with a hostess working at the club by repeatedly visiting her there and eventually winning her heart. Visiting the club costs money which is raised by doing part-time jobs which are performed by the player simply selects one work option from among two to four, after which the result of player's work is immediately displayed and money is collected. Money is spent on club entrance, drinks purchased there for both the player and a selected hostess, and on gifts for hostesses.

The majority of the game is spent at the club one-on-one with a hostess of player's choice, trying to raise her level of affection for the player by answering her questions in a favorable way, giving her desired presents, and scoring high on mini-games which include karaoke performances by the hostesses during which the player times button presses along with the music, as commonly done in music games. Player's performance over repeated visits determines whether player will achieve a happy ending with a particular hostess, or is left lonesome and unable to return to the club again due to expired membership or triggered a certain event that causes both of the player to remain as friends only rather than lovers.

== Reception ==
Regarding the game's Vita version, Ky of 4Gamer.net wrote that the game was "amazing" and utilized the unique features of the console well.
