= Dream Club =

Dating sim video game

Dream Club (Dream C Club)
- Xbox 360 cover art of Dream Club
- Developers: Tamsoft; DReAM X CReATe; Sound ams
- Publisher: D3 Publisher
- Platforms: Xbox 360; PlayStation Portable; PlayStation 3
- Release: Xbox 360: JP: August 27, 2009; PSP: JP: October 28, 2010; PS3 ^{Complete Edipyon!}: JP: November 15, 2012
- Genre: Dating sim
- Mode: Single-player

Dream Club (ドリームクラブ or Dream C Club, Dorīmu Kurabu) is a dating sim video game developed by Tamsoft and published by D3 Publisher for the Xbox 360, PlayStation Portable, and PlayStation 3. The game was released in Japan only on August 27, 2009.

== Gameplay ==
Gameplay screenshot

The player's goal of the game is to achieve a happy ending with a hostess working at the club by repeatedly visiting her there and eventually winning her heart. Visiting the club costs money which is raised by doing part-time jobs which are performed by the player simply selects one work option from among two to four, after which the result of player's work is immediately displayed and money is collected. Money is spent on club entrance, drinks purchased there for both the player and a selected hostess, and on gifts for hostesses.

The majority of the game is spent at the club one-on-one with a hostess of player's choice, trying to raise her level of affection for the player by answering her questions in a favorable way, giving her desired presents, and scoring high on mini-games which include karaoke performances by the hostesses during which the player times button presses along with the music, as commonly done in music games. Player's performance over repeated visits determines whether player will achieve a happy ending with a particular hostess, or is left lonesome and unable to return to the club again due to expired membership or triggered a certain event that causes both of the player to remain as friends only rather than lovers.

== Reception ==
Four reviewers from Famitsu gave the original Xbox 360 version of Dream Club a 6/10 rating.

== Legacy ==
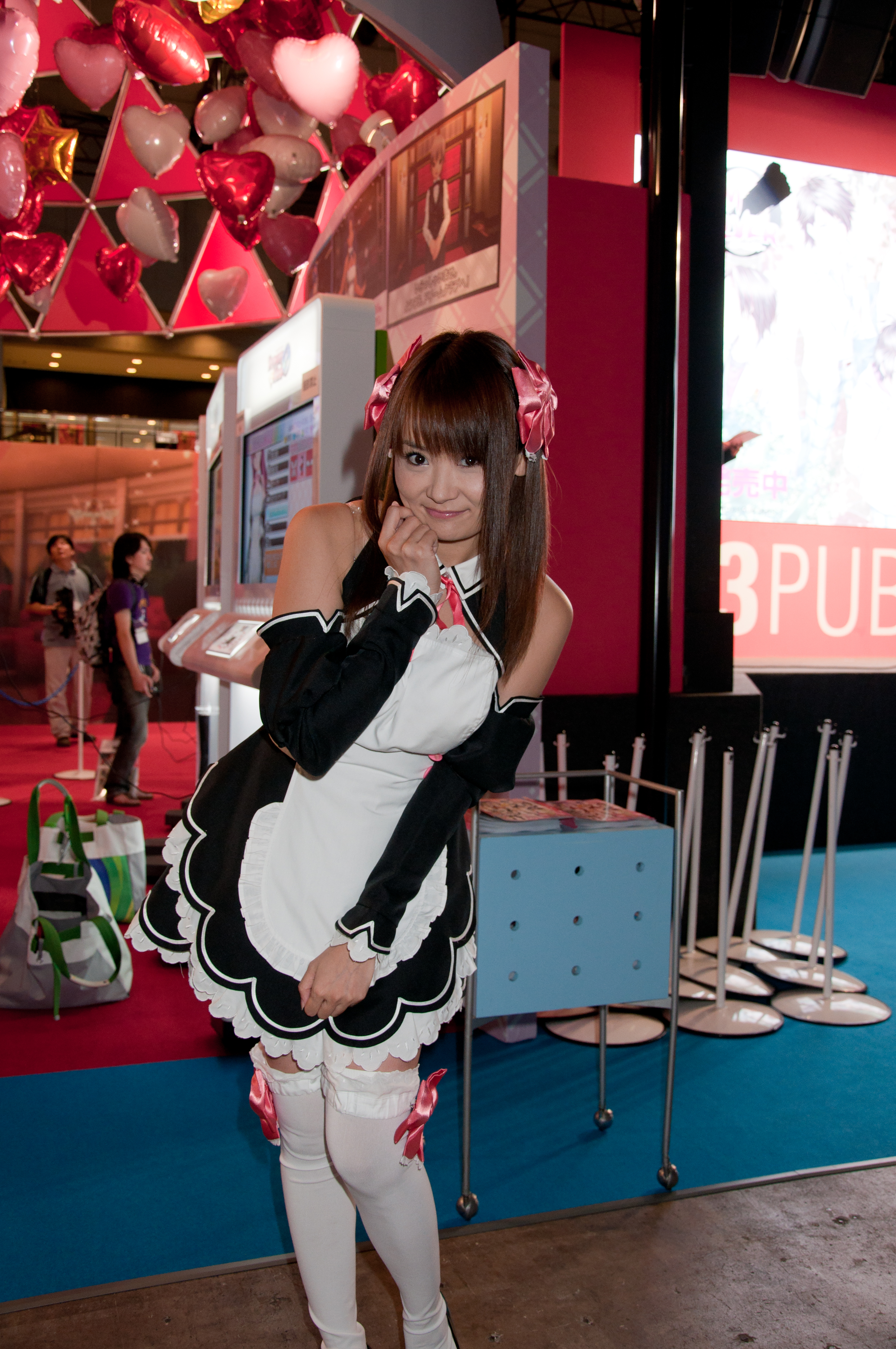
The official cosplayer of Amane at Tokyo Game Show 2010

The October issue of Comic Rush, sold August 26, started publishing the first manga version of Dream C Club, called Dream Club Destiny and drawn by 888. Another manga adaptation, named Dream C Club: Dear Girls started serializing on Famitsu Comic Clear on May 15, 2010.

Two music clips produced by Project No. 9 were released on November 10, 2010. The first one used the song "Sweetx2☆Summer" sung by Ami Koshimizu and Kaori Mizuhashi, featuring the heroines Amane and Setsu. The second used "Time Traveler" sung by Asumi Kodama and Sawa Ishige, and featuring the heroines Airi and Mari.

=== Sequels ===
A sequel to the game, titled Dream Club Zero, was released on January 27, 2011. The game features three new hostesses, such as Haruka, a rich girl, Nonono, who comes from the future, and Asuka, a professional beach volleyball player. The game is rated D by CERO, due to featuring more sexual themes than in the first game, such as erotic eating.

In March 29, 2012, a spin-off Mahjong title by the name of "Mahjong Dream C Club" was released for the Xbox 360 as well as the PlayStation 3.

On February 22, 2014 a free to play spin-off by the name of "Dream C Club: Host Girls on Stage" was released for PlayStation 4.

Another sequel was released on April 10, 2014 for the PlayStation 3 by the name of "Dream C Club Gogo".
