= Taxi Rider =

2004 video game

- PAL box art
- Developer: Tamsoft
- Publishers: JP: D3 Publisher; EU: 505 GameStreet
- Platform: PlayStation 2
- Release: JP: March 8, 2004; EU: February 3, 2006
- Genre: Racing
- Mode: Single player

Taxi Rider, known as The Taxi: Untenshu ha Kimida (THE タクシー 〜運転手は君だ〜; lit. "The Taxi: You are the Driver"), is a video game for the PlayStation 2 developed by Tamsoft. It was published in Japan by D3 Publisher as volume 48 of the Simple 2000 series, and in Europe by 505 GameStreet.

A port for the PlayStation Portable was released in 2007 as Simple 2500 Series Portable!! Vol.9: The My Taxi.

== Gameplay ==
Gameplay in the Coast area

The game's concept is similar to that of Sega's Crazy Taxi, in that the player, as a taxi driver, must pick up customers and deliver them to their destination within a fixed time limit. However, the execution differs from Sega's game - instead of competing to earn as much money as possible within a fixed time limit, the player is employed by Ogawara Gengorou, the boss of a local taxi firm, and given a quota which they must earn before the shift ends, with the ultimate goal of earning one million yen. Each shift, which can take place in the morning or evening, constitutes a "day" in-game, and the quota increases each day. After successfully completing a shift, the player may gain bonuses such as upgrades to the taxi's handling, acceleration or maximum speed or access to a previously restricted area. Additionally, customers may give additional challenges such as reaching the target without stopping or with transposed steering. However, unlike Crazy Taxi, the game does not feature any stunts or jumps, with the exception of nitro boosts which can be collected and used; it is also generally slower, particularly early in the game when the taxi's engine has not been upgraded.

== Setting and graphical style ==
The game is set in the fictional Nijiiro (literally "rainbow-coloured") City, presumably located somewhere in Japan, with adjoining areas including Dream Hills (a residential area), Coast Amusement Center and Dragon Peak. Rather than opting for the semi-realistic approach of Crazy Taxi, the cars and people in the game are rendered in a super deformed style similar to the Choro Q video games (some of which were also developed by Tamsoft).
