= Captain Tsubasa: Rise of New Champions =

2020 video game

- North American Nintendo Switch cover art
- Developer: Tamsoft
- Publisher: Bandai Namco Entertainment
- Director: Shinichi Ichikawa
- Producers: Tsuzuki Katsuaki; Shintarou Nakaoka; Ko Ogura
- Programmer: Tomohiro Yonezu
- Composer: Tadayoshi Makino
- Series: Captain Tsubasa
- Platforms: Microsoft Windows; Nintendo Switch; PlayStation 4
- Release: JP: August 27, 2020; WW: August 28, 2020
- Genre: Action
- Modes: Single-player, multiplayer

Captain Tsubasa: Rise of New Champions (Note: Japanese: Kyaputen Tsubasa: Rise of New Champions (キャプテン翼 RISE OF NEW CHAMPIONS)) is an association football sports video game developed by Tamsoft and published by Bandai Namco Entertainment for Microsoft Windows, Nintendo Switch and PlayStation 4 in August 2020. It is based on the 2018 anime series Captain Tsubasa.

== Gameplay ==
Captain Tsubasa: Rise of New Champions includes offline and online multiplayer modes, and a single-player story mode split into two sub-modes: Episode Tsubasa, allowing players to experience the original storyline, and Episode New Hero, allowing players to create their character and level up in a fashion similar to the FIFA series' Player Career mode or Pro Evolution Soccer's Become A Legend mode. In New Hero, players can choose to represent Nankatsu Middle School, Furano Middle School, Toho Academy, Musashi Middle School, Otomo Middle School, or Hanawa Middle School before playing in the Junior Youth World Challenge.

== Plot ==
The game follows two distinct plotlines: firstly, "Episode Tsubasa" retraces Tsubasa Oozora's goal to achieve a three-peat at the 16th National School Tournament, while its sequel, "Episode New Hero", follows the player's custom made avatar joining one of different middle school then forming the All-Japan national soccer team to win the Junior Youth World Challenge, an international U-16 tournament.

=== Episode Tsubasa ===
The story begins with Tsubasa Oozora training with his team, Nankatsu MS. Among the players present are hotheaded defender Ryo Ishizaki, cowardly determined goalkeeper Yuzo Morisaki and grand-framed defender Shingo Takasugi, alongside three players forming the "Shutetsu Trio", consisting of midfielder and heading expert Mamoru Izawa, forward and main scorer Teppei Kisugi and forward and sideline specialist Hajime Taki. As the team trains, they are interrupted and defeated by the Otomo Quartet, the four main players of rival middle school Otomo: the quartet consists of midfielder and captain Hanji Urabe, defenders Masao Nakayama and Koji Nishio and midfielder Takeshi Kishida. As they depart, Nankatsu soon encounters Kojiro Hyuga, a forward and captain for Toho Academy known for his relentlessly aggressive play and long-lasting childhood rivalry against Tsubasa: he swears to him that he will defeat Nankatsu for good after having lost the two previous iterations of the 16 Middle School National Tournament, of which Nankatsu won both times against Toho in the finals.

After defeating Otomo in the Shizuoka Prefecture Finals, Nankatsu advances to the 16th Middle School National Tournament, where Toho was playing against Musashi, led by midfielder Jun Misugi, also known as the "Young Noble" for his well-executed and graceful plays. Shortly before the match ends, Misugi, through a series of passes from his teammates, attempts to score a goal against Toho, since Musashi was behind in points: however, Ken Wakashimazu, Toho's goalkeeper known for using his karate techninques in a soccer match, barely catches the shot one-handedly, thus ending the match with Toho winning 3-2.

However, due to Misugi's heart failure, Hyuga falters slightly as a tiger whihout fangs, which gets criticized by his mentor Kozo Kira, who forces him to train in Okinawa, where Hyuga develops his "Tiger Shot" skill by breaking through the waves with the ball. However, the Toho coach Makoto Kitazume, known for his strict teaching and a self-made set of convictions he abides to. Learns about Hyuga's trip and gets angry. As Hyuga arrives for 16th Middle School National Tournament after devolping his Tiger Shot, Kitazume berates and punishes him by benching him for the duration of the tournament.

== Development ==
Rise of New Champions was developed by Tamsoft, based on the 2018 anime series Captain Tsubasa, and produced by Tsuzuki Katsuaki, who described the game design as similar to arcade soccer games.

The game was released by Bandai Namco Entertainment in 2020 in Japan for Nintendo Switch and PlayStation 4 on August 27, and internationally for Microsoft Windows, Nintendo Switch and PlayStation 4 the very next day on August 28.

== Marketing ==
In April 2021, Bandai Namco Europe and the Ligue de Football Professionnel began a partnership through which 17 of the 20 2020-21 Ligue 1 clubs (not including Paris Saint-Germain FC, Olympique Lyonnais and Olympique de Marseille) had their kits unlockable through a two-week event in April and May the same year.

== Reception ==
Reception

Aggregate scores
Aggregator	Score
Metacritic	PC: 75/100; NS: 71/100; PS4: 69/100
OpenCritic	59% recommend (Note: Based on 72 reviews)

Review scores
Publication	Score
Computer Games Magazine	8/10
Nintendo Life	7/10
Nintendo World Report	7.5/10
Push Square	5/10
Shacknews	7.5/10

The Microsoft Windows version of the game received generally positive reviews, while the console versions were met by "mixed or average reviews", according to the review aggregator Metacritic. Fellow review aggregator OpenCritic assessed that the game received fair approval, being recommended by 59% of critics.

The Nintendo Switch version of 'Rise of New Champions was the sixth highest-selling retail game during its first week of sale in Japan, with 16,678 copies being sold. During the same week, the PlayStation 4 version sold 13,828 copies in Japan, making it the eighth bestselling retail game of the week in the country. By September 2020, over 500 000 physical and digital copies had been sold worldwide.
