= Battle Arena Nitoshinden =

1996 video game

Battle Arena NiToshinden
- Developer: Japan Vistec
- Publisher: Takara
- Producers: Akihiko Kimura, Takayoshi Tanigawa
- Programmers: Junichi Ohno, Yūichirō Tanaka, Michiharu Nishihashi
- Platform: PlayStation
- Release: JP: September 27, 1996
- Genre: Fighting
- Modes: Single-player, multiplayer

Battle Arena NiToshinden is a 1996 fighting game developed by Japan Vistec and published by Takara for the PlayStation. It is a spin-off from the Battle Arena Toshinden series. It was only released in Japan; it was planned for the US under the name of Toshinden Kids but was canceled. Nitoshinden features super deformed characters, similar to those in Virtua Fighter Kids. The title Nitōshinden (にとうしんでん) is a combination of the franchise's name Toshinden (闘神伝) with the Japanese term nitōshin (二頭身).

== Gameplay ==
Gameplay screenshot of Ellis vs. Rika who appears as a guest in the game

The gameplay of Nitoshinden is different from the main series. Each characters' move list has been reduced to 6 attacks; 4 standard attacks, a special attack and a desperation attack.

The normal attacks roughly correspond to standard Toshinden attacks. There is a hard attack, light attack, low attack and either a medium or 360 degree attack (depending on the character). There is no real combo ability but some attacks can be chained together.

The game features a different defense system to standard Toshinden games. The side step moves still exist, however blocking of other attacks is now done with a parry button that repels an opponent's attack, stunning them for a short time.

Areas in Nitoshinden are all school-based locations and feature walled-in arenas, similar to Battle Arena Toshinden 3.

== Characters ==
Existing characters from the Toshinden series in this game are:

- Eiji
- Ellis
- Sho
- Sofia
- Tracy
- Vermilion

Unique characters that only appear in this game are:

- Baifu
- Ryuji
- Rika (guest character)
