= Tamsoft =

Japanese video game developer

Tamsoft Corporation
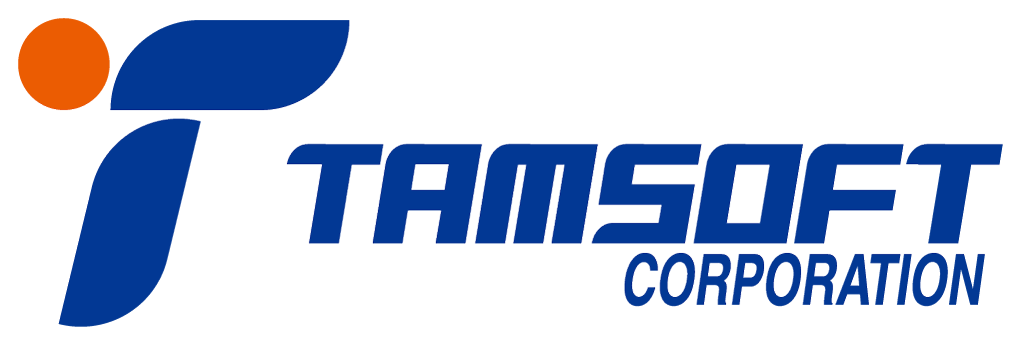

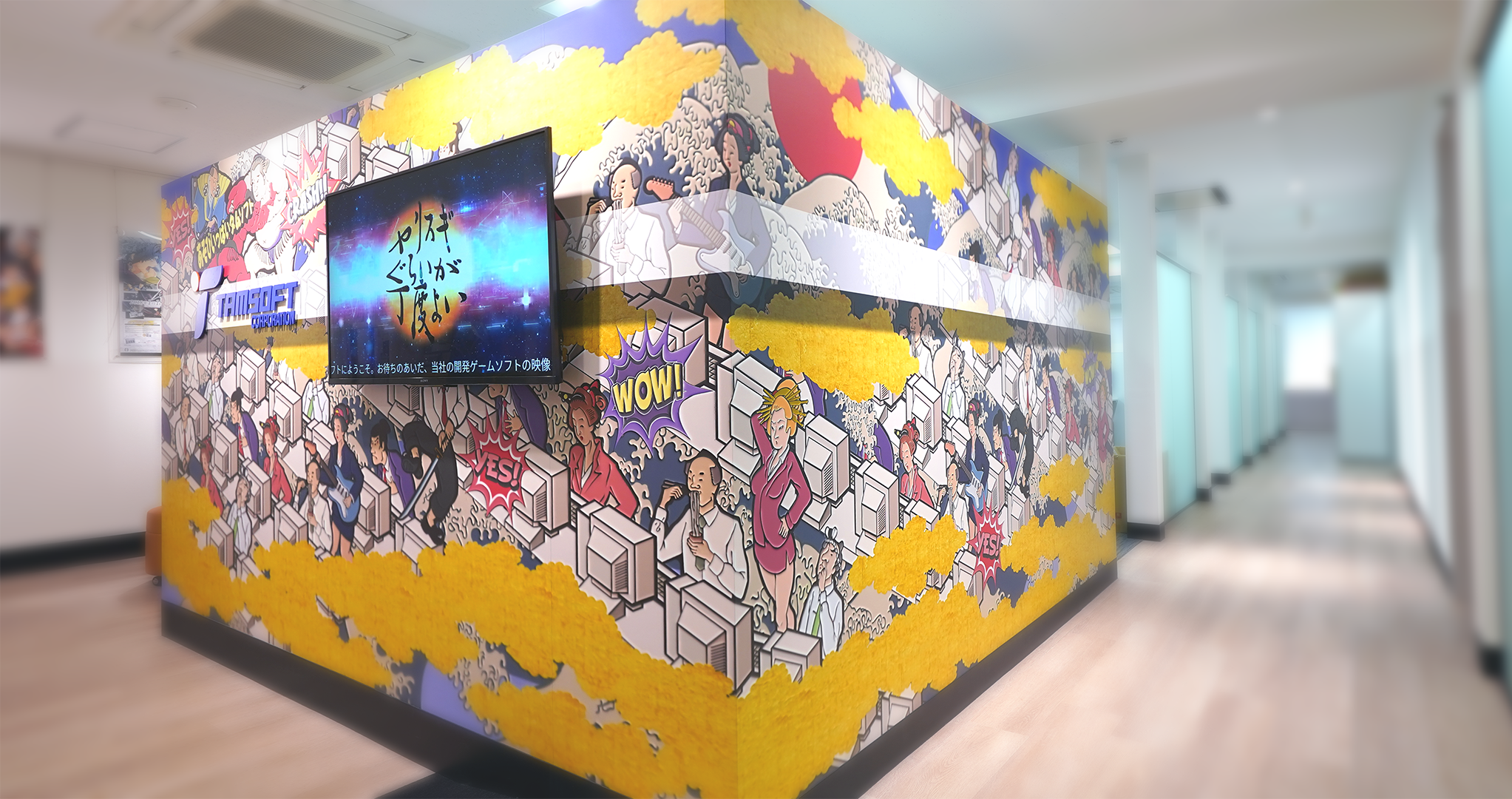
- HQ entrance
- Type: Kabushiki gaisha
- Industry: Video games
- Founded: 26 June 1992
- Headquarters: Asakusa, Tokyo, Japan
- Area served: Japan
- Key people: Ko Ogura (President)
- Number of employees: 119
- Website: http://www.tamsoft.co.jp

Tamsoft Corporation (株式会社タムソフト, Kabushiki Gaisha Tamu Sofuto) is a Japanese video game developer founded in 1992, best known for their work on the Battle Arena Toshinden, Onechanbara and Senran Kagura series. Its former president, Toshiaki Ōta, previously worked at Toaplan as one of the six original team members and head of software development.

They began by being contracted to Takara in the 1990s developing several games for them, their first being the Game Boy port of SNK's Samurai Showdown. This was followed by the popular fighter Battle Arena Toshinden on Sony's PlayStation console, using the 'HyperSolid' graphics engine; Tamsoft would afterwards develop the rest of the main series: Battle Arena Toshinden 2, 3, and 4. They also made SteamGear Mash on Sega Saturn, Penny Racers and the fighting adventure game AbalaBurn on PlayStation.

In 1998, Tamsoft released their first self-published game, Guardian's Crusade. They returned to being a contractor and developed several games in D3 Publisher's Simple 1500 series and then Simple 2000 series on PlayStation 2, including the Onechanbara series. More recently they developed the Dream Club dating sims, and the Senran Kagura hack and slashers for Marvelous, and have also co-developed a number of spin-off games in the Hyperdimension Neptunia series.

== List of Tamsoft games ==
=== PlayStation ===
==== Full Price ====
- AbalaBurn
- Knight & Baby
  - North America: Guardian's Crusade
- Block Kuzushi 2
- Toshinden
  - North America/Europe: Battle Arena Toshinden
- Toshinden 2 (and Toshinden 2 Plus)
  - North America/Europe: Battle Arena Toshinden 2
- Toshinden 3
  - North America/Europe: Battle Arena Toshinden 3
- Toshinden Subaru
  - Europe: Toshinden 4
- Choro Q
  - Europe: Penny Racers
- Choro Q 2
- Choro Q 3

==== Simple 1500 Series ====
- Simple 1500 Series Hello Kitty Vol.1: Hello Kitty Bowling
- Simple 1500 Series Hello Kitty Vol.2: Hello Kitty Illust Puzzle
- Simple 1500 Series Hello Kitty Vol.3: Hello Kitty Block Kuzushi
- Simple 1500 Series Vol.13: The Race
  - North America: Racing
  - Europe: Pro Racer
- Simple 1500 Series Vol.14: The Block Kuzushi
- Simple 1500 Series Vol.18: The Bowling
  - North America: Bowling
- Simple 1500 Series Vol.45: The Block Kuzushi 2
  - Europe: Block Buster

=== PlayStation 2 ===
==== Full Price ====
- Dog of Bay (Marvelous Entertainment, 2000)
- D.N.A.: Dark Native Apostle (Hudson Soft, 2001)
  - Europe: D.N.A.: Dark Native Apostle (Virgin Interactive Entertainment, 2002)
- Ore ga Kantoku da! (Enix, 2000)
- Ore ga Kantoku da! Vol 2 (Enix, 2002)
- Itadaki Street 3 (Enix, 2002) (PlayStation 2 porting)
- Power Smash 2 (Sega, 2002) (PlayStation 2 porting)
  - North America: Sega Sports Tennis (Sega, 2002)
  - Europe: Virtua Tennis 2 (Sega/Acclaim, 2002)
- Drift Champ (Hudson Soft, 2002)
- Makai Tenshō (D3 Publisher, 2003)
- Taxi Rider (D3 Publisher, 2005)

==== Simple 2000 Series ====
- Simple 2000 Series Vol.5: The Block Kuzushi Hyper
  - Europe: Bust-a-Bloc
- Simple 2000 Series Vol.7: The Boxing
  - Europe: Boxing Champions
- Simple 2000 Series Vol.20: The Dungeon RPG: Shinobu ~Mamono no Sumu Shiro~
  - Europe: Eternal Quest
- Simple 2000 Series Vol.24: The Bowling Hyper
  - Europe: Bowling Xciting
- Simple 2000 Series Vol.27: The Pro Yakyuu ~2003 Pennant Race~
- Simple 2000 Series Vol.30: The Street Baske 3on3
  - Europe: Basketball Xciting
- Simple 2000 Series Vol.47: The Kessen Sekigahara
  - Europe: Shogun's Blade
- Simple 2000 Series Vol.48: The Taxi ~Utenshu ha Kimida~
  - Europe: Taxi Rider
- Simple 2000 Series Vol.50: The Daibijin
  - Europe: Demolition Girl
- Simple 2000 Series Vol.51: The Senkan
  - Europe: Iron Sea
- Simple 2000 Series Vol.54: The Daikaijuu
  - Europe: Deep Water
- Simple 2000 Series Vol.55: The Catfight: Onna Neko Densetsu
  - Europe: Fighting Angels
- Simple 2000 Series Vol.57: The Pro Yakyuu 2004
  - Europe: Baseball Mania (Cancelled)
- Simple 2000 Series Vol.61: The Oneechanbara
  - Europe: Zombie Zone
- Simple 2000 Series Vol.63: The Suiei Taikai
  - Europe: Party Girls
- Simple 2000 Series Vol.65: The Kyonshi Panic
  - Europe: Zombie Attack
- Simple 2000 Series Vol.68: The Tousou Highway
  - Europe: Car Race Challenge
- Simple 2000 Series Vol.73: The Saiyuutou Saruden
  - Europe: Monkey King (Unconfirmed)
- Simple 2000 Series Vol.79: The Party Quiz
- Simple 2000 Series Vol.80: The Oneechampuruu: ~The Oneechan Special Chapter~
  - Europe: Zombie Hunters
- Simple 2000 Series Vol.87: The Senko (The Nadeshiko)
  - Europe: Dragon Sisters
- Simple 2000 Series Vol.90: The Oneechanbara 2
- Simple 2000 Series Vol.101: The Oneechanpon ~The Oneechanbara 2 Special Chapter~
  - Europe: Zombie Hunters 2
- Simple 2000 Series Vol.102: The Hohei ~Senjou no Inutachi~
  - Europe: Covert Command
- Simple 2000 Series Vol.106: The Block Kuzushi Quest ~DragonKingdom~
- Simple 2000 Series Vol.109: The Taxi 2 ~Untenshi ha Yappari Kimi da!~
- Simple 2000 Series Vol.110: The Tousou Prisoner ~Los City Shinjitsu Heno 10 Jikan~
- Simple 2000 Series Vol.112: The Tousou Highway 2 ~Road Warrior 2050~
- Simple 2000 Series Vol.113: The Tairyou Jigoku
- Simple 2000 Series Vol.114: The Jo'okappichi Torimonochou ~Oharuchan GOGOGO!~
- Simple 2000 Series Vol.118: The Ochimusha ~Ikaebu Samurai Toujou~
- Simple 2000 Series Vol.120: The Saigo no Nihonhei ~Utsukushiki Kokudo Dakkan Sakusen~
- Simple 2000 Series Ultimate Vol.3: Saisoku! Zokukuruma King
  - Europe: Maxxed Out Racing
- Simple 2000 Series Ultimate Vol.6: Love*Upper!
  - Europe: Heartbeat Boxing
- Simple 2000 Series Ultimate Vol.7: Saikyou! Shirobai King
  - Europe: Police Chase Down
- Simple 2000 Series Ultimate Vol.13: Kurusou! Tansha King
  - Europe: Motorbike King
- Simple 2000 Series Ultimate Vol.15: Love*Pingpong!
  - Europe: Pink Pong
- Simple 2000 Series Ultimate Vol.18: Love*Aerobi
  - Europe: Fitness Fun (TBC)
- Simple 2000 Series Ultimate Vol.21: Kenka Joutou! Yankee Banchou
  - Europe: Street Boyz
- Simple 2000 Series Ultimate Vol.24: Makai Tenshō (re-release)
- Simple 2000 Series Ultimate Vol.25: Chou Saisoku! Zokukuruma King BU no BU

=== PlayStation Portable ===
==== Full Price ====
- Dream Club Portable
- Ikki Tousen: Eloquent Fist
- Ikki Tousen: Xross Impact
- OneChanbara Portable

==== Simple 2500 Portable!! Series ====
- Simple 2500 Portable!! Series Vol. 5: The Block Kuzushi Quest ~DragonKingdom~
- Simple 2500 Portable!! Series Vol. 12: The Hohei 2: Senyuu yo, Sakini Ike
- Simple 2500 Portable!! Series Vol. 13: The Akuma Hunters – Exorsister

=== Xbox 360 ===
- Dream Club
- Dream Club Zero
- Onechanbara: Bikini Samurai Squad

=== Wii ===
- Alien Crush Returns
- Family Party: 30 Great Games
- Family Party: Fitness Fun
- OneChanbara: Bikini Zombie Slayers
- Simple 2000 Wii Series Vol. 2: The Party Game

=== Nintendo DS ===
==== Full Price ====
- Koisuru Purin!: Koi ha Daibouken! Dr. Kanmi no Yabou!?
- Norimono Oukoku: You! Unten Shichainayo!
- Paint by DS: Military Vehicles
- Tokyo Beat Down
- Unknown Soldier: Mokuba no Houkou
- Witch's Wish

==== Simple DS Series ====
- Simple DS Series Vol. 20: The Senkan
- Simple DS Series Vol. 21: The Hohei
- Simple DS Series Vol. 22: The AgeAge Zeroyon Midnight
- Simple DS Series Vol. 29: The Sports Daishuugou
- Simple DS Series Vol. 34: The Haishasan
- Simple DS Series Vol. 39: The Shouboutai

=== PlayStation 3 ===
- Natsuiro High School: Seishun Hakusho

=== Nintendo 3DS ===
- Senran Kagura Burst
- Senran Kagura 2: Deep Crimson

=== PlayStation Vita ===
- Gintama Rumble

==== Full price ====
- Dream Club Zero Portable
- Senran Kagura Shinovi Versus
- Hyperdimension Neptunia: Producing Perfection
- Hyperdimension Neptunia U: Action Unleashed
- Senran Kagura: Estival Versus
- MegaTagmension Blanc + Neptune VS Zombies
- Drive Girls

==== Simple V Series ====
- Simple V Series Vol. 1: The Docodemo Gal Mahjong
- Simple V Series Vol. 2: The Tōsō Highway Fullboost: Nagoya–Tokyo Gekisō 4-jikan

=== PlayStation 4 ===
- Onechanbara Z2: Chaos
- Utawarerumono: ZAN
- Senran Kagura: Estival Versus
- Natsuiro High School: Seishun Hakusho
- School Girl/Zombie Hunter
- Senran Kagura: Peach Beach Splash
- Cyberdimension Neptunia: 4 Goddesses Online
- Gintama Rumble
- Hinomaruko (Cancelled)
- Onechanbara Origin
- Captain Tsubasa: Rise of New Champions
- Neptunia x Senran Kagura: Ninja Wars
- Melty Blood: Type Lumina
- Bleach Rebirth of Souls

=== PlayStation 5 ===
- Utawarerumono: ZAN
- Bleach: Rebirth of Souls
- Captain Tsubasa II: World Fighters

=== PC ===
- Hyperdimension Neptunia U: Action Unleashed
- Senran Kagura Shinovi Versus
- Onechanbara Z2: Chaos
- MegaTagmension Blanc + Neptune VS Zombies
- Senran Kagura: Estival Versus
- Cyberdimension Neptunia: 4 Goddesses Online
- School Girl/Zombie Hunter
- Senran Kagura: Peach Beach Splash
- Onechanbara Origin
- Captain Tsubasa: Rise of New Champions
- Melty Blood: Type Lumina
- Bleach Rebirth of Souls
- Captain Tsubasa II: World Fighters

=== Nintendo Switch ===
- Captain Tsubasa: Rise of New Champions
- Hinomaruko (cancelled)
- Melty Blood: Type Lumina
- Captain Tsubasa II: World Fighters

=== Sega Saturn ===
- Steam Gear * Mash

=== Xbox One ===
- Melty Blood: Type Lumina

=== Xbox Series X/S ===
- Bleach Rebirth of Souls
- Captain Tsubasa II: World Fighters
