= Toshinden 4 =

1999 video game

- Developer: Tamsoft
- Publishers: JP: Takara; EU: Studio 3
- Series: Battle Arena Toshinden
- Platform: PlayStation
- Release: JP: August 12, 1999; PAL: June 30, 2000
- Genre: Fighting
- Modes: Single-player, multiplayer

Toshinden 4, (Note: Referred to as Battle Arena Toshinden 4 on the title screen) released in Japan as Toshinden Subaru (Note: Japanese: 闘神伝 昴, Hepburn: Tōshinden Subaru) is a 1999 fighting game developed by Tamsoft and published by Takara on the PlayStation.It is the fourth and final installment in the Battle Arena Toshinden series, Unlike its predecessors, it was not released in North America. The game features an all new roster of characters, with only former protagonist Eiji, antagonist Vermilion and Naru returning. The new protagonist in Toshinden 4 is Eiji's nephew, Subaru, who is the son of Eiji's brother Sho. It received a negative critical reception.

== Gameplay ==
Story mode now consists of teams of three-on-three battles. Extra modes include Survival, Time Attack and Practice modes. Before every fight, there is a cutscene in line with the game plot.

== Plot ==
Ten years after the events of Toshinden 3, Eiji Shinjo, who is now the new leader of an organization called the "Gerard Foundation", has organized a fourth Toshinden tournament which revolves around the gathering of four holy weapons that can be used to either save the world or destroy it. Eiji's old enemy, Vermilion, is after the four holy weapons for his own malevolent ambition and that many fighters from within the tournament, including Eiji's own nephew Subaru, find themselves getting caught from within the conflict itself. Along the way, Subaru is accompanied by Naru, an adoptive daughter of Eiji's old friend, Kayin who debut as a child in the third game, now grown up and currently trying to find her adoptive father's whereabout, following his disappearance.

A plot point introduced in this game focused on the Four Sacred Arms. Though seen in full since Battle Arena Toshinden 2, their relevance was never previously brought up. Each weapon bears a reference to one of the Chinese cardinal beasts, Byakko, Suzaku, Seiryu and Genbu. The weapons also seem to change appearance depending on the user. While the Byakko no tachi (White Tiger Fang) is usually seen as a rather plain katana, the Seiryuu no yari (Azure Dragon Spear) was a long leaf tipped spear while held by Mondo, yet altered to an ornate golden rod in the hands of Eos. As a purely cosmetic addition, when using a certain attack, an image of the beast associated with the weapon will display in the background.

Plotwise, it was said that when all four weapons were gathered together, they would bestow tremendous power on a person. Most characters in the game have their endings based around uniting the weapons and receiving the power of them. In some endings, they use this power to speak to a parent or loved one. However, Eiji's ending reveals the true nature of the power behind the weapons: It is the "Toshin", or god of fighting.

== Reception ==
Reception

Review scores
| Publication | Score |
|---|---|
| GameSpot | 3.4/10 |
| PlayStation: The Official Magazine | 3/10 |
| Official NZ PlayStation Magazine | 3/10 |
| Neo Plus | 5/10 |

The game was poorly received. Official PlayStation Magazine opined the "multiple game modes provide no cover for a lackluster fighting game".

Christian Nutt of GameSpot, reviewing an imported Toshinden 4, wrote that the controls are "awkward" and that there is a "lot of delay", further criticizing the moves and attacks as well as graphics, but he had a positive opinion about the voices, anime opening, and character designs.
