= Battle Arena Toshinden =

Fighting video game series

- Genre: Fighting
- Developer: Tamsoft
- Publisher: Takara
- Creator: Shintarō Nakaoka
- Platforms: Arcade, PlayStation, Sega Saturn, Microsoft DOS, Windows 95
- First release: Battle Arena Toshinden; January 1, 1995
- Latest release: Toshinden 4 June 30, 2000

Battle Arena Toshinden, released in Japan as Toshinden (Japanese: 闘神伝), is a fighting game series developed by Tamsoft and produced by Takara.

== Video games ==
Developed by Tamsoft and produced by Takara, the Battle Arena Toshinden series is composed of four video games, though the first three numbered entries are often referred to as the Toshinden trilogy. A prequel game, Toshinden Next, was revealed in 1997 featuring concept art, but ultimately cancelled.

| Release | Title | Platform | Notes |
|---|---|---|---|
| 1995 | Battle Arena Toshinden •Toshinden (闘神伝)^{JP} | PlayStation, Sega Saturn, MS-DOS | The DOS version, ported by Playmates Interactive Entertainment, added Earthworm Jim as a guest character. Re-released on the Sega Saturn as Battle Arena Toshinden Remix (Toshinden S in Japan), featuring a new character, Cupido. |
| 1995 | Battle Arena Toshinden 2 •Toushinden 2 (闘神伝2)^{JP} | Arcade, PlayStation, Windows 95 | An enhanced version, Battle Arena Toshinden 2 Plus, was released exclusively in Japan in 1996. |
| 1996 | Battle Arena Toshinden URA •Toushinden URA (闘神伝2)^{JP} | Sega Saturn | A modified version of Toshinden 2 with a new storyline. |
| 1996 | Battle Arena Toshinden 3 •Toshinden 3 (闘神伝3)^{JP} | PlayStation | |
| 1999 | Toshinden 4 •Toshinden Subaru (闘神伝 昴)^{JP} | PlayStation | Was not released in North America. Retitled Toshinden 4 for its release in PAL regions. |

=== Spinoff games ===
While the main series used realistic proportions for the cast, the spin-off titles instead used a chibi artstyle.

| Release | Title | Platform | Genre | Notes |
|---|---|---|---|---|
| 1996 | Battle Arena Toshinden •Nettōu Tōushinden (熱闘闘神伝)^{JP} | Game Boy | Fighting | Developed by Betop. Uranus, a character introduced in Battle Arena Toshinden 2, appears as an unlockable character. |
| 1996 | Battle Arena Nitoshinden (にとうしんでん) | PlayStation | Fighting | Originally planned for release in North America as Toshinden Kids before the localization was cancelled. Featured four unique characters: Shu, Ryuji, Baifu, and guest character Rika. The game is a parody title, set within a high school. |
| 1996 | Battle Arena Toshinden | R-Zone | Fighting | Developed by Tiger Electronics. |
| 1997 | Puzzle Arena Toshinden (パズルアリーナ闘神伝) | PlayStation | Tile-matching puzzle | Japanese exclusive. Uses character designs from Battle Arena Toshinden 3. |
| 1998 | Toshinden Card Quest (闘神伝カードクエスト) | PlayStation | Board game | Japanese exclusive. Uses character designs from Battle Arena Toshinden 3. A new character, Selene, was created exclusively for the game. |

=== Related ===
| Release | Title | Platform | Notes |
|---|---|---|---|
| 1997 | D-Xhird (ディ・サード) | Sega Saturn | A fighting game developed by Nextech and published by Takara. Toshinden series protagonist Eiji appears as a guest character within the title. |
| 2009 | Toshinden (闘真伝) | Wii | A fighting game full reboot of the series developed by DreamFactory and published by Takara Tomy. None of the characters from the original series appear in this title, nor does it reference the original Toshinden story. |
| 2027 | Toshinden Collection (闘神伝COLLECTION) | TBA | A compilation of the first three Battle Arena Toshinden games, published by Edia. |

== Characters ==
Most of the playable cast up to Battle Arena Toshinden 2. Back row: Chaos, Mondo, Sho, Rungo, Duke, Cupido, Gaia. Front row: Tracy, Fo Fai, Kayin, Eiji, Sofia, Ellis

When Tamsoft was initially developing the cast, director Shintarō Nakaoka started with a basic concept taking inspiration from the duality of Ryu and Ken Masters of Capcom's Street Fighter series. Working with character designer Miho Furukawa, he then followed with developing certain character archetypes to provide a variety of physiques to the game, such as the "big man", the "guru", and the "lolita". As development progressed others added their own elements, such as programmers adding unique animations to characters to give them more visible personality, while one core person was assigned to each character to assist with the planning stage.

The character designs were finalized and drawn by Tsukasa Kotobuki, who also provided input on the development process. The game's publisher Takara initially sought to have Masami Obari for this role, but he was unable to due to obligations on another project and suggested Kotobuki instead. According to Battle Arena Toshinden URA director Norihiro Hayasaka, with the original game there was a noticeable discrepancy between the artwork Kotobuki would do for the game's characters and select screen and the character models themselves, particularly in how Kotobuki drew the female characters as slender with large breasts. Hayasaka pushed for the models to be closer to Kotobuki's art in terms of silhouette as a result, but also keep sharp edges to retain a style unique for Toshinden.

=== Introduced in Battle Arena Toshinden ===
| Name | Description |
|---|---|
| Eiji Shinjo (エイジ・シンジョウ) | A young Japanese traveling swordsman/adventurer who seeks to find his long-lost older brother, Sho. Eiji progresses through the tournament and ultimately comes face-to-face with the tournament's sponsor, Gaia |
| Ellis (エリス, Eris) | Though her nationality is Turkish, she is of Japanese descent, and was taken in by a traveling circus troupe as a young orphan. After she discovers the game's antagonist, Gaia, is her father upon his defeat, she feels indifferent and returns to the troupe. A year later, during the events of Battle Arena Toshinden 2, she learns he is being hunted by his former allies as a traitor. She enters the tournament to try and help him. In Battle Arena Toshinden 3, the game's new antagonists begin to operate near and target the circus, and Ellis decides to stop them. |
| Cupido (クピードー) | A character exclusive to the Sega Saturn version of the game and acting as its final boss, and Sho's wife. She wears black tights, high riding underwear over them, red bracers with a matching cape, and a red midriff shirt under the cape. Cupido has purple hair in a bobcut, fights using a rhomphaia, and is described as "a woman living as a man". Kotobuki originally designed the character as a man, but the development team later changed Cupido to female, much to his surprise. Her design is meant to resemble a female version of Sho, with a crimson color theme, while she was given a short shaved haircut to create an androgynous look. |
| Duke B. Rambert (デューク・バルテルミ・ランバート) | An arrogant French knight who seeks to find and defeat Eiji to avenge a past loss to him. |
| Fo Fai (ホー・ファイ) | An elderly Chinese magician who is secretly a cold-hearted serial killer. Fo Fai enters the tournament to satisfy his bloodlust. |
| Gaia (ガイア) | The final boss of the game and sponsor of the tournament, as well as Ellis' father. |
| Kayin Amoh (カイン・アモウ) | A Scottish (later retconned as English) swordsman/bounty hunter, a friend and rival of Eiji. He seeks to avenge the death of his foster father, who was killed by the previous tournament's champion from last year. |
| Mondo (門土, モンド) | An emotionless Japanese ninja warrior who infiltrates the tournament under the orders from a rival group of the Secret Society. |
| Run-go Iron (ラングー・アイアン) | A strong yet kind-hearted American miner who seeks to rescue his wife Lila and his son Christopher from the Secret Society. |
| Sho Shinjo (ショウ・シンジョウ) | The secret final boss. He is the winner of the previous tournament, and brother of Eiji. |
| Sofia (ソフィア) | A whip-wielding blonde Russian woman who works as a private detective. She seeks to find and recover her long-lost memories. |

=== Introduced in Battle Arena Toshinden 2 ===
| Name | Description |
|---|---|
| Chaos (カオス) | An extremely tall, bald Sri Lankan man. An executive of the Secret Society, he was rendered mute during the events of the tournament, confusing others in the group. After the fall of the organization, he becomes catatonic until he heard of the tournament during the events of Toshinden 3. He wields a scythe and a shield, though was at one point considered to use large punch daggers instead, similar to those the character Ripper would use later. He wears a red and black outfit with emphasized thighs and shoulders, and a Muay Thai headband around his head. Kotobuki initially conceived him as a cynical character named "Kamao". Originally meant to have a nihilistic, serious, and dark personality, these traits were removed during the development process, and Chaos behaves in a significantly abnormal manner instead. |
| Master (マスター) | Master is leader of the Gerrard Foundation and Secret Society. A sixteen year old boy with an androgynous appearance and green hair, he uses psychic powers to wield a massive sword. Originally praised on the public stage, he became isolated and as a result became cold to the idea of harming others. |
| Tracy (トレーシー) | An aggressive police officer invited to the tournament. She is a tanned American woman with long blue hair, a green halter top and matching shorts and a large police badge on her chest. Armor plating covers her knee pads, shoulder pads, gloves, and boots. Tracy fights using tonfas as well as blades embedded in her boots. Kotobuki conceived Tracy as a tomboy to contrast against the feminine Ellis and Sofia. Meanwhile, her animations were designed with a more masculine character in mind. Initially she was meant to be more muscular, with emphasized abdominals. These along with black tights between her shorts and knee pads were removed to illustrate her slender and revealing figure. Meanwhile, she wears a reverse ballcap to give her a more boyish and less cute appearance. Her attire was meant to have a camouflage pattern to illustrate her as combat-ready, but it was simplified to a solid green in the final. For Toshinden 3, much of the armor was removed, while her cap was replaced with a head wrap and biker goggle combination. Tights under her shorts were also re-integrated into the design. |
| Uranus (ウラヌス) | One of the executives of the Secret Society, she is a tall blonde woman resembling an angel clad in silver armor, wielding a bow. Though she serves Master, she enters the tournament with the intention of killing and usurping him. The wings on her back are left vague as to whether they are growing from her body or part of her armor. Her initial design featured golden armor with red highlights, while the collar obscured her face. |
| Vermillion (ヴァーミリオン) | A mysterious gunfighter wielding a shotgun and a revolver. Vermillion is a tall blonde man wearing a black tattered trenchcoat and glasses, and was designed to be both sharp looking and cool. His all-black outfit and perpetual smile were meant to convey a sense of madness, and he has two red streaks of paint across his face and in a V between his eyes. Vermillion's glasses are angled downward to imply they are just for show. In Toshinden 3, his outfit was changed to a tuxedo with red symbols covering it, and works with the game's villains to gather information for them. |

=== Introduced in Battle Arena Toshinden URA ===
| Name | Description |
|---|---|
| Replicant (レプリカント) | Created by Ronron, it is a prototype android that was stolen and reprogrammed, acting as a recurring boss the player must defeat. The game's story revolves around the player trying to retrieve it. It uses the same attacks as Sho. In-game, its name is shorted to Repli. |
| Ripper (リッパー) | Ripper is a mysterious killer wielding two large punch daggers. He wears a sleeveless red jacket with a high collar, black pants, and a headwrap that covers most of his purple hair. He enters the tournament in search of someone. |
| Ronron (ロンロン) | Ronron is a scientist who was working on the Replicant before it escaped. She now chases after it despite being ill-suited for fighting, and uses a stungun/hammer hybrid when fighting. Lonlon is a Chinese a woman with thick glasses and a ponytail lifted to the side. She wears a white shirt and matching stockings, a short red skirt, a yellow tie, and a backpack. Her appearance was based on Akira Toriyama's Arale-chan character, and was intended to portray a normal girl shoved into the tournament. Her attacks meanwhile were meant to be comedic but also sexy. |
| Wolf (ボルフ) | The game's villain and final boss, Wolf is a large man dressed in a gi wielding a training sword. He can slam the sword into the ground to create a massive shockwave. |

=== Introduced in Battle Arena Toshinden 3 ===
Toshinden 3 not only featured characters returning from the previous games minus Fo Fai, but several new characters. Many of them however shared the same movesets of existing fighters, such as Zola being based on Sofia.

| Name | Description |
|---|---|
| Abel (アベル) | Abel is leader of the Organization, a group that seeks to remake the world in their image, having augmented his body and abilities to this end. Unlike other characters, he fights with his bare hands. He is a muscular man with a black bodysuit that exposes his chest and arms, red leggins, and orange hair peeking out of a black turban. The game originally only featured one boss character, someone they wanted to portray as stronger, to this end considering to have the character dual wielding weapons while wearing religious vestments. The concept was eventually split into two separate characters, Abel and Veil. Because Abel fights with his bare hands, as his design evolved his outfit was gradually made lighter. |
| Adam (アダム) | Adam is a large yellow robot, acting as Abel's bodyguard. He wishes to become human, and worships the Organization's god in hopes his dream can become reality. He is a counterpart to Rungo Iron, though fights with a cannon instead of a club. Adam went through several design concepts of varying types, with some wielding a club instead of his finalized cannon while others resembled a construction robot. |
| Atahua (アタワ) | Atahua is a black man from Peru, dressed in tribal attire. The descendant of an ancient empire, he joins the series' Organization in hopes of restoring his people to glory. He fights using two bladed flutes, and acts as a counterpart to Ellis. Early designs were intended to give a more intimidating appearance, and wielding hatchets instead. |
| Balga (バルガ) | Balga is a Norwegian knight who seeks to destroy Duke and his entire family. |
| Bayhou (バイホウ) | Bayhou is a large white monkey from China, who watched Fo Fai train and eventually killed him using the martial artist's own techniques. He uses Fo Fai's claws, and wears a back-mounded basked with a human skull tucked inside. Bayhou is hunted by the Organization for unknown reasons. In-game, one of Bayhou's alternate outfits changes his appearance to that of Fo Fai, but with a large red gash across his back. |
| Cuiling (スイレイ) | Cuiling is a woman from Hong Kong who was trained as an assassin at a young age. After the conglomerate she was staying with was destroyed, she began to work for the Organization. Wielding long claw weapons, like Bayhou she fights similarly to Fo Fai, who in her backstory trained her for a time. An early concept for her character had her acting as a more direct counterpart to Bayhou, being a dark colored and genetically modified monkey. Other early concepts would have had her be silent and emotionless, wearing an outfit that incorporated bells. These bells were later included in her finalized design. |
| David (デヴィッド) | David is an Englishman who found himself targeted by Abel. |
| Judgment (ジャッジメント) | Judgment was a childhood friend of David before being transformed into a mute killing machine by the Organization. Though he follows their orders, he is hesitant to fight David. Hailing from England, he wears an orange and blue straitjacket outfit, with a burned appearance hidden beneath a hockey mask on his face. He fights using a long chainsaw, and is a counterpart to David. |
| Leon (レオン) | Leon is a tall American man with a red outfit and pink bandana that fights using a one-handed sword. Acting as an underling for Abel, he attacks Eiji to sacrifice him for one of the Organization's rituals, but in the process develops a love for fighting. He is the game's counterpart to Eiji. While his finalized appearance resembled a pirate, early designs resembled a dancer, and had a more timid appearance. |
| Miss Til (ミス・ティル) | Early designs of her character were significantly different, resembling a Japanese shrine maiden with two lit candles in her hair, and armed with a singular long dagger. |
| Nagisa Iwashiro (ナギサ・イワシロ) | A Japanese policeman, he works with Tracy to investigate the organization. |
| Naru Amoh (ナル・アモウ) | Naru is Kayin's foster daughter, seeking to help him in battle. She appears as a secret boss under the right conditions. |
| Rachel (レイチェル) | Rachel is Tracy's twin sister, separated from her at birth. After the organization tells her Tracy is the cause of her unfortunate life, she seeks revenge. Rachael appears as a tanned woman with short red hair and large breasts. Her outfit consists of a headband, red halter top, and workout pants, while she wields a double tonfa in each hand. Her design was intended to be somewhat provocative. |
| Schultz (シュルツ) | Schultz is a member of the Organization, clad in a black outfit that covers the top of his head and featuring red lipstick with blue fingernails. A tall German man with a long thing mustache, he is a priest and mad scientist who assists with the Organization's rituals and uses his own body as material to cast spells. Schultz fights using a heavy scythe and is a counterpart to previous character Chaos. His character design was intended to invoke imagery of a grim reaper. |
| Shizuku Fuji (シズク・フジ) | Shizuku is a Japanese gambler dressed as a geisha. A friend of David, she helps protect him from Abel's machinations. |
| Tau (タウ) | Tau is a large Brazilian tribesman who looks after and aids Atahua. |
| Ten Count (テン・カウント) | Ten Count is a British assassin for the Organization, with his name coming from the head start he gives his victims before hunting and killing them. A tall man in a white suit with matching fedora, he fights using an arming sword, and is a counterpart to Kayin Amoh who he hunts down during the course of the game's story. His appearance and mannerisms reference those of real-life musician Michael Jackson. However, early designs featured a very different outfit, illustrating throwing knives and were based on depictions of archer William Tell. |
| Toujin (トウジン) | Toujin is a Japanese man with a long nose, similar to a tengu. He seeks the secret to immortality to save his dying wife, and approaches the organization to this end. Dressed similarly to a Japanese monk, he wields a kiseru and acts as a counterpart to Mondo. Early designs for Toujin resembled a Japanese priest instead, and lacked the tengu reference of his finalized design. |
| Veil (ヴェイル) | Veil is a destructive being that was sealed within Abel, trapped there after he failed the Organization. Freed during the game's climax, he seeks to cause destruction. Wearing black armor, his eyes are red with blue makeup around them and orange hair on his head. He fights using two pink energy blades. The game originally only featured one boss character, someone they wanted to portray as stronger, to this end considering to have the character dual wielding weapons while wearing religious vestments. The concept was eventually split into two separate characters, Abel and Veil. Several ideas were considered for his weapons, including beam sabers, with the earliest version based on Ripper's character design. His outfit also went through various incarnations, including heavy religious attire, before being changed to armor fastened with belts and screws. |
| Zola (ゾラ) | An opera singer from Austria, she hunts down beautiful people and acts as an assassin for the Organization. She is large breasted woman with pink hair, dressed in a black catsuit with plunging cleavage, spiked pauldrons, and a cat-themed mask with wide ears. She fights using a claw on her left hand a weighted whip in her right, acting as a counterpart to Sofia. Zola's outfit was inspired by the characters Catwoman and Lady Doronjo, with her animations referencing the former. Early versions were going to have her fight using a snake as a weapon, before switching to a long thin whip similar to ones used by jockeys. |

=== Introduced in Toshinden 4 ===
Toshinden 4 replaced most of the cast, with only Eiji, Naru, and Vermillion returning. The game lets you choose one of three three-fighter teams, with Vermillion being his own team.

| Name | Description |
|---|---|
| Bang-Boo (バン・ブー) | A Cuban cyborg programmed to follow Genma and Miyabi. |
| Eos (イオス) | An Italian modified human, she resembles an angel and works with Eiji's organization. |
| Fen Barefoot (フェン・ベアフット) | A young tribal boy accompanied by a pig who seeks revenge against Genma for killing his grandfather. |
| Genma (ゲンマ) | A 2000 year old Chinese sorcerer who seeks to take over the world. |
| Lancelot Lakeknight (ランスロット・レイクナイト) | A noble yet cowardly fencer who seeks to prove himself against Naru. |
| Miyabi (みやび) | A kunoichi brainwashed to serve Genma. She is being chased by Rook after previously defeating him in a street fight. |
| Puella Marionette (プエラ・マリオネット) | A Swiss girl who seeks to bring peace to the world. Wields Uranus' bow. |
| Rook Castle (ルーク・キャッスル) | A nunchaku wielder who seeks to test his skills against his idol, Eiji. Seeks to fight Miyabi again after she defeated him in a street fight. |
| Subaru Shinjo (スバル・シンジョウ) | Subaru is the son of Sho and Cupido, and pupil of Eiji. He is currently looking for his mentor. |
| Zero (ゼロ) | A Greek synthetic man who works with Eiji. |

== Other media ==
From the beginning there was a manga tie-in with characters drawn by Tsukasa Kotobuki, alongside a number of other anthology comics in Japan, including from Hobby Japan, a monthly series by Takeshi Takibayashi on Monthly Shōnen Ace (with elements from Toshinden 2), another comic published by Softbank Creative, and one by Kozumi Shiita published by Enix.

Drama CDs serving as sequels to the game were released named Before Stage, the first volume of which was released in March 1996, using the original Japanese voice cast. This would be followed by an anime OVA adaptation of the same title, released in 1996 and also dubbed in English.

== Critical reception ==
As the series progressed, media outlets took issue with the differing versions of the games that would exclude certain characters while introducing new ones. In particular, Toshinden URA received disdain for this aspect, with some reviews calling Ronron one of the worst characters in fighting games in general.

The staff of Diehard GameFan in their retrospective on the series felt it was "trash", with several expressing they saw the cast as lackluster. Chris Bowen in particular felt they were equally as terrible as the cast of fighting game series Killer Instinct, and further argued the game had no place amongst modern fighting games, as he felt a market for sex appeal in fighting games amongst otakus had been claimed at that point by the Dead or Alive franchise. Mark B. shared similar sentiments, stating that Sofia was one of the few memorable aspects from the series, due to an overtly sexualized design that was "pandering to young boys everywhere". But felt the character's relevance had faded, as in 2010 he had "seen more huge chested females in fighting games in the past ten years than a chiropractor in California".

The staff of Chinese magazine Ultra Console Game in a 2004 retrospective stated that while Toshinden had a strong initial showing due to its visual presentation, overshadowing Sega's Virtua Fighter and Namco's Tekken series, they felt the latter was more due to Namco focusing more heavily on its Ridge Racer franchise at the time. They further stated that while the gameplay was severely lacking, the visuals and simple special attacks allowed players to excuse it. However, when looking back they felt the games overall just lacked too much depth, were clunky and even slow paced, and questioned many of the positive reactions the series received from gaming magazines at launch. They found comparisons of Toshinden by such publications to Virtua Fighter and Tekken laughable, as while both of those series persisted, Toshinden had become mostly forgotten before the turn of the millennium.
