= GamePro =

American video game magazine

- May 2010 issue cover: Tom Clancy's Splinter Cell: Conviction
- Vice President, Content: Julian Rignall
- Categories: Video game journalism
- Frequency: Monthly
- First issue: Magazine: April 1989; 37 years ago Website: 1998; 28 years ago
- Final issue: Magazine: Winter 2011; Website: 2011
- Company: IDG
- Country: United States
- Based in: Oakland, California
- Language: English
- Website: Gamepro.com (archived)
- ISSN: 1042-8658
- OCLC: 19231826

GamePro was an American multiplatform video game magazine media company that published online and print content covering the video game industry, video game hardware and video game software. The magazine featured content on various video game consoles, personal computers and mobile devices. GamePro Media properties included GamePro magazine and their website. The company was also a part subsidiary of the privately held International Data Group (IDG), a media, events and research technology group. The magazine and its parent publication printing the magazine went defunct in 2011, but is outlasted by Gamepro.com.

Originally published in 1989, GamePro magazine provided feature articles, news, previews and reviews on various video games, video game hardware and the entertainment video game industry. The magazine was published monthly (most recently from its headquarters in Oakland, California) with October 2011 being its last issue, after over 22 years of publication. GamePro's February 2010 issue introduced a redesigned layout and a new editorial direction focused on the people and culture of its gaming. Despite the shutdown of U.S. operations, the magazine continues to operate internationally in France, Germany, and Spain.

GamePro.com was officially launched in 1998. Updated daily, the website's content included feature articles, news, previews, reviews, screenshots and videos covering video games, video game hardware and the entertainment gaming industry. The website also included user content such as forums, reviews and blogs. In January 2010, the website was redesigned to reflect the same new editorial changes being made in the print magazine. The website was based at Gamepro's headquarters in San Francisco from 1998 to 2002 and then in Oakland, California from 2002 to 2011.

== History and establishment ==
Gamepro was first established in late 1988 by Patrick Ferrell, his sister-in-law Leeanne McDermott, and the husband-wife design team of Michael and Lynne Kavish. They worked out of their houses throughout the San Francisco Bay Area before leasing their first office in Redwood City, California at the end of 1989. Lacking the cashflow to be able to sustain growth after publishing the first issue, the founding management team sought a major publisher and in 1989 found one with IDG Peterborough, a New Hampshire-based division of the global giant IDG. Led by a merger and acquisition team comprising IDG Peterborough President Roger Murphy and two other executives, Jim McBrian and Roger Strukhoff, the magazine was acquired, then a few months later spun off as an independent business unit of IDG, under the leadership of Ferrell as president/CEO. The later addition of John Rousseau as publisher and editor-in-chief Wes Nihei, as well as renowned artist Francis Mao, established Gamepro as a large, profitable worldwide publication. Francis Mao, acting in his role as art director for the nascent GamePro, contracted game illustrator Marc Ericksen to create the premiere cover for the first edition of the magazine. Ericksen would go on to produce five of the first ten covers for GamePro, eventually creating eight in total, and would continue a secondary role creating a number of the double page spreads for the very popular monthly Pro Tips section. The magazine had a monthly circulation of 300,000.

First issue (April 1989)

Over the years, the Gamepro offices have moved from Redwood City (1989–1991) to San Mateo (1991–1998) to San Francisco (1998–2002) and lastly Oakland. In 1993, the company was renamed from Gamepro Inc. to Infotainment World in reflection of its growing and diverse publication lines.

The magazine was known for its editors using comic book-like avatars and monikers when reviewing games. As of January 2004, however, Gamepro ceased to use the avatars due to a change in the overall design and layout of the magazine. Meanwhile, editorial voices carried over to the community on its online sister publication, www.gamepro.com.

There was a TV show called GamePro TV. The show was hosted by J. D. Roth and Brennan Howard. The show was nationally syndicated for one year, then moved to cable (USA and Sci-Fi) for a second year.

In 1993, Patrick Ferrell sent Debra Vernon, VP of marketing, to a meeting between the games industry and the Consumer Electronics Show (CES). Realizing an opportunity, the team at the now-entitled Infotainment World launched E3, the Electronic Entertainment Expo. The industry backed E3 and Ferrell partnered with the IDSA to produce the event. It was one of the biggest trade show launches in history.

Early in its lifespan, the magazine also included comic book pages about the adventures of a superhero named Gamepro who was a video game player from the real world brought into a dimension where video games were real to save it from creatures called the Evil Darklings. In 2003, Joyride Studios produced limited-edition action figures of some of the Gamepro editorial characters.

Gamepro also appeared in several international editions, including France, Germany, Spain, Portugal, Italy, Turkey, Australia, Brazil and Greece. Some of these publications share the North American content, while some others share only the name and logo but do feature different content.

Early in 2006, IDG Entertainment began to change internally and shift operational focus from a "Print to Online" to "Online to Print" publishing mentality. The first steps; build a large online network of web sites and rebuild the editorial team. Enter: George Jones, industry veteran.

In February 2006, Gamepro's online video channel, Games.net, launched a series of video-game related shows. The extensive online programming is geared towards an older and more mature audience.

In August 2006, the Gamepro online team spun off a new cheats site, GamerHelp.com. It was shortly followed by a video game information aggregation site, Games.net, and a dedicated gaming downloads site, GameDownloads.com.

Under the new leadership of George Jones, Gamepro magazine underwent a massive overhaul in the March 2007 issue. While losing some of the more dated elements of the magazine, the new arrangement focused on five main insertions: HD game images, more reviews and previews per issue, www.gamepro.com community showcase, user contributions and insider news. However the German Gamepro website is still run, however this time, by "GameStar" as their partner, as that website have a message at the top of the screen saying "Partner of GameStar" (Note: This is written in German)

In 2009, Gamepro's 20th anniversary coincided with 20-year industry veteran John Davison joining the newly named Gamepro Media team in October 2009 as executive vice president of content. Under Davison's direction, the magazine and website were redesigned in early 2010 with an editorial shift toward focusing on the people and culture of gaming. The redesigned magazine and website were met with an enthusiastic audience response.

In addition to announcing the hire of Davison in October 2009, the company also announced an "aggressive growth plan throughout 2009 and beyond, with numerous online media initiatives to deepen consumer engagement and create new opportunities for advertisers." Plans included partnering with sister company IDG TechNetwork to build a "boutique online network of sites." The result was the introduction of the Gamepro Media Network.

In September 2010, Gamepro Media announced a new alliance with online magazine The Escapist offering marketers joint advertising programs for reaching an unduplicated male audience. The partnership was named the Gamepro Escapist Media Group.

In November 2010, Julian Rignall joined Gamepro Media as its new vice-president of content, replacing John Davison, who resigned in September 2010.

Gamepro ended monthly publication after over 22 years with its October 2011 issue. Shortly after that issue, the magazine changed to Gamepro Quarterly, which was a quarterly publication using higher quality paper stock as well as being larger and thicker than all of the previous standard magazine issues. Gamepro Quarterly hit newsstands within the first half of November 2011. The quarterly endeavor lasted for only one issue before being scrapped. On November 30, it was announced that Gamepro as a magazine and a website would be shutting down on December 5, 2011. Gamepro then became part of the PC World website as a small section of the site covering the latest video games, run by the PC World staff.

== Content ==
=== Main sections ===
In February 2010, the magazine's main sections were:-

- Inside: A redesigned table of contents page listing the major pieces and games in the issue.
- From the Editor: A column found at the beginning of the magazine from the editor introducing features or big games covered in that month's issue.
- Inbox: User feedback and letter of the month.
  - Art Attack: Reader art sent into the magazine. That month's best art would win a game-related prize.
- Editorials: Articles on varying topics by freelance writers and individuals working in the game industry.
- Spawn Point: Front of magazine sections featuring behind-the-scenes game news and insights, interviews, game previews and a calendar of "gamer-culture events".
- The Bonus Level: A short guide to "essential geek gear", including video game releases, books and game-related items for sale at various websites.
- Features: Any cover stories or featured games/issues that warrant a separate article would be told here.
- Reviews: This section was initially named "ProViews" and later renamed to "ProReviews". The reviews format changed over the years, although the original basic format remained the same: One reviewer speaks for the entire Gamepro staff about a particular game. The magazine initially began by giving each platform its own section of reviews. Near the end of 2005, Gamepro changed this format to have only one review for any game released on more than one platform, describing any differences that one platform may have over another with that particular game, and giving separate scores for each platform's version of the game. During 2006, another aspect of the reviews debuted, called "Key Moment", in which the reviewer names one particular instance or a standout piece of the game that led them to the decision they made in a short, one sentence description. "Key Moment" was eventually replaced by "Pros" and "Cons", found with the review score, which briefly list any issues that stand out with the game, both good and bad.
- Parting Shot: With the major overhaul of the magazine in the February 2010 issue, Opening Shots was dropped, and Parting Shot went from being art from a particular game showcased at the back of the magazine, to a look back at the issue of Gamepro that appeared that month 10 years ago.

=== Retired sections ===
- Opening Shots/Parting Shot: Use of higher quality HD images and bigger, more detailed screen shots throughout the magazine. "Opening Shots" is a new screen grab gallery at the front of the magazine, while "Parting Shot" is art from a game showcased at the back of the magazine.
- The Hub: Section dedicated to the Gamepro.com online community. Back of the magazine highlights of reader reviews, comments, new "Ask the Pros" question of the month, community leaders profile highlights, featured forum threads and the new Head2Head: User feedback and letter of the month. Every week, the Hub gets a new Featured Member.
  - Ask The Pros: Returns from the past in this new, online version of user submitted question (online) and answered by the editor of relative expertise.
  - Head2Head: User feedback and letter of the month return to new subsection in rear of each issue.
- Previews (formerly known as "Short ProShots" and then "Sneak Previews"): A peek at games in development, telling of the projected release dates of games and what to expect out of them. When this column first appeared, it was in the back of the magazine, with only minuscule information. In 1996, it was moved to the front of the magazine after the features. It was shortly after the rearranging in 1996 that GamePro started a new approach to the previews, labeling previews as either "First Look", where they may have only seen a video and only had information on storyline and features in the game, and "Hands-On", where the editor providing the preview got to play an early build of the game and described any first impressions of the game. Also added for a short time in 1996 was a "percent complete bar" graphic that noted how far along the game was. This graphic was dropped in 1999 during the 10th Anniversary redesign.
- Games To Go: Reviews and previews of games for portable game systems.
- The Sports Page: Previews and reviews of sports games. When this section debuted in 1993, each review and preview got its own "headline" to give the section a newspaper feel. By the end of 1996, the newspaper-style headlines were only used for one or two reviews each issue and never for previews, and they were dropped entirely in 1999 for the 10th Anniversary redesign. This section was also the first section to have the "multiplatform game review" tactic described above, in 2003.
- Role Players Realm: Reviews, previews, and walkthroughs of role playing games (RPGs). Often a walkthrough for a game would be serialized across two or three issues. During slow months for RPGs, the section would be padded with fantasy-themed video games from other genres.
- Code Vault (formerly "S.W.A.T. Pro"): Video game cheats, strategies, tactics, tips, secrets and easter eggs revealed. Both game companies and readers sent in submissions for this section, with a random prize to the reader who sent in the best tip (usually a game). When this section debuted as S.W.A.T. Pro, S.W.A.T. stood for "Strategies, Weapons, and Tactics". This name was also used for a short lived sister magazine focusing on cheats and strategies. Starting with the October 2001 issue, this feature was renamed "Code Vault" so as to match the name of Gamepro's second short-lived cheat-code spinoff magazine.
- Head-2-Head (formerly known as "The Mail"): A letters to the editor section. They began doing a "Letter Of The Month" special in 2004, with the winning letter's author winning a particular prize. This section had begun to feature a Reader Review from their website on a particular game as a way to entice other readers to visit their site and do the same. Throughout the magazine's lifespan, this section was in the front of the magazine. However, as of April 2007's redesign, the section has been moved to the back of the magazine.
- Buyers Beware: A consumer advocacy section in which readers send in complaints about defective and malfunctioning games, peripherals, systems, and the like. Gamepro was the only publication to feature such a column. Every once in a while, the column steered away from its usual formula to feature a current widespread issue. Whenever possible, GamePro contacted the relevant game company and a company representative would directly answer the reader's query, sometimes with the editor putting in additional advice or critical comments if he considered the company's response inadequate. This was the only Gamepro column to be authored by the same editor since its debut in 1994: The Watch Dog. This section migrated onto Gamepro.com as of the April 2007 redesign, and was seemingly dropped from the print magazine.
- ProNews: Gamepro's news section. This section first appeared in the back of the magazine after the reviews, but found its way to the front of the magazine in 1996 to follow suit with other game magazines. This section has shape-shifted over the years to include various "game watches", a random quote generation sidebar called "Static" that seemingly disappeared after 2003. Gamepro Labs, which used to be a separate column, then appeared as a part of this section.
- Hot At The Arcades: Previews and reviews of cabinet arcade games. This section appeared regularly for about 5 years after the magazine debuted. The section still appeared every now and again, but was absent for the most part since 1997 due to the steady decline of arcades. This section was at times folded into the Pro news section.
- Overseas Prospects: Import games were featured and sometimes reviewed. This section is still in the magazine, but appears only rarely.
- Video Game Survival Guide: Originally titled "16-Bit Survival Guide" when the Super NES and Genesis were on the last year of their respective runs, to review those games that were still being released for the systems. This was changed to reflect other game systems that were close to, or even past, the end of their commercial lifespan.
- Adventures of Gamepro: The Adventures of Gamepro was a comic strip run in the early issues of the magazine detailing the adventures of a superhero named after the magazine. He was a gamer drawn into the realm of video games to fight off evil creatures taking over game after game called the Evil Darklings.

=== Rating scale ===
At first, games were rated by five categories: Graphics, Sound, Gameplay, FunFactor, and Challenge. Later the "Challenge" category was dropped and the "Gameplay" category was renamed "Control". The ratings were initially on a scale of 1.0 to 5.0, in increments of 0.5, but a possible 0.5 score was later added. The first game to receive such a score was Battle Arena Toshinden URA for the Sega Saturn. Starting in October 1990, each score was accentuated with a cartoon face (The Gamepro Dude) depicting different expressions for different ratings. The ratings faces remained in use until about 2002. GamePro's reviews became esteemed enough that some games would display their GamePro ratings on their retail boxes.

After 2002, the category system was eliminated in favor of a single overall rating for each game on a scale of 1.0 to 5.0 stars. A graphic of five stars were shown alongside the written review. The number of stars a game earned was indicated by the number of solid stars (e.g., a game's 4-star rating was represented by showing 4 solid stars and one hollow star). No game ever received less than one star. An Editors' Choice Award was given to a game that earned either 4.5 or 5.0 stars.

=== Role-Player's Realm ===
GamePro had a "Role-Player's Realm" section dedicated to the coverage and reviews of role-playing video games. In the January 1997 issue, they published a list of "The Top Ten Best RPGs Ever" which consisted of the following games:

1. The Legend of Zelda: A Link to the Past (Super NES)
2. Final Fantasy 3 (Super NES)
3. Lunar: Eternal Blue / Silver Star (Sega CD)
4. Breath of Fire II (Super NES)
5. Phantasy Star IV (Genesis)
6. Secret of Mana (Super NES)
7. Chrono Trigger (Super NES)
8. Super Mario RPG (Super NES)
9. Might and Magic II (Genesis)
10. Final Fantasy 2 (Super NES)

Later in 2008, GamePro published another list of "The 26 Best RPGs of the All Time", the top ten of which consisted of the following games:

1. Final Fantasy VII
2. World of Warcraft
3. The Legend of Zelda: Ocarina of Time
4. Chrono Trigger
5. Fallout 3
6. Diablo II: Lord of Destruction
7. Ultima series
8. Xenogears
9. The Legend of Zelda: A Link to the Past
10. Star Wars: Knights of the Old Republic

=== ProTips ===
GamePro is credited with coming up with the concept of "Protip", a short piece of advice as if spoken by an expert usually attached to an image, which was explained by former writer Dan Amrich that as part of their editorial process, they were encouraged to caption the three-to-seven images used in an article with such advice.

One purported image from a GamePro review of Doom (1993) had a caption for an image of one of the game's bosses as "PROTIP: To defeat the Cyberdemon, shoot at it until it dies". The apparent advice, which is common sense and self-evident for players of first-person shooters like Doom, was widely mocked and created a meme of similarly obvious ProTips added as captions to pictures. However, the image was revealed to be a fake, created as an April Fools' joke for a fansite doomworld.com.

=== Lamepro ===
Every April until 2007, as an April Fools' Day prank, Gamepro printed a 2-5 page satirical spoof of the magazine called Lamepro, a parody of Gamepro's own official title. The feature contained humorous game titles and fake news similar to The Onion, though some content, such as ways to get useless game glitches (games getting stuck, reset, or otherwise), was real. The section parodied GamePro itself, as well as other game magazines.

== PC Games ==
What was called a "sister publication" to GamePro, PC Games, was published by IDG until 1999. It was founded in August 1988, but changed its name to Electronic Entertainment in late 1993 and PC Entertainment in early 1996. The title reverted to PC Games in June 1996. Its PC Games Online website was merged with several other IDG properties, including GamePro Online, to form the IDG Games Network in late 1997. The print version of PC Games was the fourth-largest computer game magazine in the United States during 1998, with a circulation of 169,281. In March 1999, it was purchased and closed by Imagine Publishing; its April 1999 issue was its last. Following this event, Imagine sent former subscribers of PC Games issues of PC Gamer US and PC Accelerator in its place. According to GameDaily, the move came as part of IDG's rebranding effort to lean more heavily on the GamePro name: coverage of computer games was thereafter centralized at PCGamePro.com, and in the "PC GamePro" section of GamePro's print edition.

== Australian GamePro ==
Australian GamePro

- Australian GamePro (issue 17)
- Editor: Chris Stead
- Former editors: Stuart Clarke
- Categories: Video game journalism
- Frequency: Bi-monthly
- First issue: 10 November 2003
- Final issue: February 2007
- Company: IDG
- Country: Australia
- Based in: Sydney
- Language: English
- ISSN: 1448-8825

Australian GamePro was a bi-monthly video games magazine published by IDG from 10 November 2003 to February 2007. The founding editor was Stuart Clarke, who was succeeded in January 2006 by Chris Stead. According to the latter, the magazine had doubled its sales from 2006 to 2007, but the decision to discontinue the publication came as a result of internal restructuring.

=== Special issues ===
The Australian GamePro team put together a number of special issues, including:

- Ultimate PSP Buyer's Guide
- Ultimate Nintendo Buyer's Guide
- Ultimate Xbox 360 Buyer's Guide
- Your Complete Guide to Online Gaming
- Australian GamePro Presents World of Warcraft
