= Gamba: Gamba to Nakama-tachi =

Gamba: Gamba to Nakama-tachi Gamba 3D Air Bound
- Theatrical release poster

Japanese name
- Kanji: ガンバと仲間たち
- Directed by: Tomohiro Kawamura; Yoshihiro Komori
- Screenplay by: Ryota Kosawa
- Based on: Boukenshatachi: Ganba to 15-hiki no Nakama (冒険者たち ガンバと15ひきの仲間, lit. The Adventurers: Gamba and His Fifteen Companions), a novel by Atsuo Saitō
- Produced by: Tetsu Fujimura; Kenichiro Hayafune; Avi Arad; Barry Brooker
- Starring: See below
- Edited by: Tomomi Kikuchi; Ryūji Miyajima
- Music by: Benjamin Wallfisch
- Production companies: Shirogumi; Arad Productions; Toei Animation
- Distributed by: Toei Company, Ltd.
- Release date: October 10, 2015
- Running time: 94 minutes 92 minutes (Lionsgate)
- Country: Japan
- Languages: Japanese; English
- Budget: $16,700,000
- Box office: $2,889,160

Gamba: Gamba to Nakama-tachi (Japanese: ガンバと仲間たち), alternately known in English-language releases as Gamba 3D and Air Bound, is a 2015 Japanese 3D CG animated adventure film directed by Tomohiro Kawamura and Yoshihiro Komori, produced by Tetsu Fujimura, Kenichiro Hayafune, Avi Arad and Barry Brooker, and written by Ryota Kosawa. It is based on the 1972 novel Boukenshatachi: Ganba to 15-hiki no Nakama (冒険者たち ガンバと15ひきの仲間, lit. The Adventurers: Gamba and His Fifteen Companions) by Atsuo Saitō and is a remake of the 1975 anime series Gamba no Bouken. It was released in Japan on October 10, 2015. An English-language version was released by SC Films International under the title Gamba 3D in 2015, while retaining the original Japanese names of the characters. Another English-language version was later released in the United States by Lionsgate and Grindstone Entertainment Group under the title Air Bound in 2017 that changed the Japanese names of the characters to English names.

== Plot ==
Gamba, a brave and adventurous city mouse from Tokyo, embarks on a sailing journey with his childhood friend Mampuku, in order to realize his dream of reaching the sea. On board they encounter ship mice and Chūta, a mouse who has been injured and is seeking help. He appeals for Gamba and Mampuku to assist him in defending the island of Yumemishima and its mouse colony from the invading Noroi Clan, a large murderous army of weasels, led by their psychopathic and bloodthirsty leader Noroi. Gamba elects to sail to Yumemishima with Chūta to help defend the island, and Gamba recruits more mice to join their cause on the island.

== Characters ==
Gamba (ガンバ, Ganba)
The city mouse, who calls himself "Ganbari-ya no Gamba" (がんばり屋のガンバ, "Gamba of the Eager Beaver"), he is always energetic, full of curiosity, and has a strong sense of justice. He takes a trip to show the sea to his close friend Mampuku, and meets Chūta at the harbor when they arrive. Gamba and his friends are out on a journey to heed the wishes of Chūta, to defeat Noroi who rules Noroi Island. He is renamed Gavin in Lionsgate's English film dub.

Mampuku (マンプク, Manpuku)
The Gamba's best friend, he is a gluttonous and an easygoing town mouse. His name is the result of him being absentminded. He is renamed Matthew in Lionsgate's English film dub.

Yoisho (ヨイショ)
The kind-hearted captain of sailor mice, he has a daughter named Yuri, is highly dependable and is calmer than Gamba. He lost his right eye to Noroi. He is renamed Rusty in Lionsgate's English film dub.

Gakusha (ガクシャ)
One of Yoisho's childhood friends, he is knowledgeable, clever, wears big glasses and has quite a short tail. He is renamed Grayson in Lionsgate's English film dub.

Ikasama (イカサマ)
Ikasama is a gambler and good at fraud. He is also called a "swift runner" because he is light-footed. He is renamed Ace in Lionsgate's English film dub.

Chūta (忠太, Chuuta)
An island mouse who comes to the city for help, he is a younger brother of Shioji. He is renamed Chester in Lionsgate's English film dub.

Noroi (ノロイ)
The leader weasel with snow-white fur and light blue eyes, he is a cruel and bloodthirsty killer and when his blue eyes shine eerily in the dark, he can apply hypnotism to lure his victims, who serves as a king of weasel clan. He is renamed Winston in Lionsgate's English film dub.

Shioji (潮路)
The granddaughter of the elder mouse Shuro from Yumemishima, and is an older sister of Chūta. She is renamed Shelly in Lionsgate's English film dub.

Tsuburi (ツブリ)
The leader of the streaked shearwaters. Many members of her flock and their eggs were slaughtered by Noroi and his clan. At first reluctant, she helps the mice in their battle against the Noroi Clan. She is renamed Theresa in Lionsgate's English dub.

== Voice cast ==
Role	Japanese	English	
Role	Japanese	SC Films International (2015)	Lionsgate (2017)
Role	Japanese	Passo Passo	Bang Zoom! Entertainment
Gamba (Ganba)	Yuuki Kaji	Jack Merluzzi	Gavin
Gamba (Ganba)	Yuuki Kaji	Jack Merluzzi	Nash Grier
Mampuku (Manpuku)	Wataru Takagi	Ryan Drees	Matthew
Mampuku (Manpuku)	Wataru Takagi	Ryan Drees	Jimmy Tatro
Shioji	Sayaka Kanda	Julia Yermakov	Shelly
Shioji	Sayaka Kanda	Julia Yermakov	Justine Ezarik
Noroi	Mansai Nomura	Michael Rhys	Winston
Noroi	Mansai Nomura	Michael Rhys	Jon Lovitz
Yoisho	Akio Ootsuka	Walter Roberts	Rusty
Yoisho	Akio Ootsuka	Walter Roberts	Imari Williams
Gakusha	Shuuichi Ikeda	Michael Rhys	Grayson
Gakusha	Shuuichi Ikeda	Michael Rhys	Crispin Freeman
Bōbo (Bobo)	Yasuhiro Takato	Jeff Manning	Max Mittelman
Ikasama	Keiji Fujiwara	Eric Kelso	Ace
Ikasama	Keiji Fujiwara	Eric Kelso	Ray Chase
Chūta (Chuuta)	Akiko Yajima	Katie Adler	Chester
Chūta (Chuuta)	Akiko Yajima	Katie Adler	Michelle Ruff
Tsuburi	Masako Nozawa	Katie Adler	Theresa
Tsuburi	Masako Nozawa	Katie Adler	Wendee Lee
Chuichi (Chuuichi)	Akio Nojima	Jeff Manning	Clarence
Chuichi (Chuuichi)	Akio Nojima	Jeff Manning	Michael McConnohie
Shin'ichirou	Takashi Hikida	Ryan Drees	Shiloh
Shin'ichirou	Takashi Hikida	Ryan Drees	Kirk Thornton
Youichi	Yukitoshi Tokumoto	Eric Kelso	Owen
Youichi	Yukitoshi Tokumoto	Eric Kelso	Doug Erholtz

Additional voices:

- English (Lionsgate/ Bang Zoom! Entertainment): Amanda Celine Miller, Chris Hackney, Damien Haas, Dave Mallow, David W. Collins, Dorah Fine, Dorothy Elias-Fahn, Doug Stone, Erika Harlacher, Janice Kawaye, Jason Linere White, Jay Preston, Joseph J. Thomas, Kaiji Tang, Katelyn Gault, Keith Silverstein, Kyle Hebert, Lex Lang, Mark Whiten, Philece Sampler, Vernon Dew, Zeno Robinson

== Music ==
Gamba (Original Motion Picture Soundtrack)

Soundtrack album by Benjamin Wallfisch
- Released: 1 February 2016
- Recorded: 2015
- Genres: Anime, film
- Length: 62:16
- Label: Varèse Sarabande
- Directors: Tomohiro Kawamura; Yoshihiro Komori

Benjamin Wallfisch chronology
A Flickering Truth (2015)	Gamba (Original Motion Picture Soundtrack) (2016)	Pressure (2015)

The soundtrack album titled Gamba (Original Motion Picture Soundtrack) was composed and conducted by the British film score composer and conductor Benjamin Wallfisch. It was produced by the record label Varèse Sarabande and released on February 1, 2016. The album has 22 tracks with a total length of 62:16 minutes.
