= Gamba no Bouken =

Japanese anime television series

- Gamba no Bōken
- Gamba and his friends

ガンバの冒険 (Ganba no Bouken)
- Genre: Adventure
- Created by: Atsuo Saitō
- Anime television series
- Directed by: Osamu Dezaki
- Produced by: Tooru Ueno; Sankichirou Kusube
- Written by: Mitsuru Majima; Yutaka Kaneko; Souji Yoshikawa; Hideo Takayashiki; Atsushi Yamatoya; Yoshio Takeuchi
- Music by: Takeo Yamashita
- Studio: Tokyo Movie (Note: Production assistance (制作協力) for all episodes were provided by A Production.)
- Original network: NNS (NTV)
- Original run: April 7, 1975 – September 29, 1975
- Episodes: 26
- Anime film

Boukenshatachi: Gamba to 7-biki no Naka Ma
- Directed by: Shinzo Azaki
- Studio: Tokyo Movie Shinsha
- Released: March 4, 1984
- Runtime: 93 minutes
- Anime film

Gamba to Kawauso no Bouken
- Directed by: Shunji Ōga
- Music by: Hiroaki Kondo
- Studio: Tokyo Movie Shinsha
- Released: July 20, 1991
- Video game

Gamba no Bouken: The Puzzle Action
- Publisher: Bandai
- Genre: Puzzle, action
- Platform: PlayStation
- Released: March 4, 2003
- Other media
- 2015 film

Gamba no Bouken (ガンバの冒険; lit. Adventures of Gamba) is a Japanese anime series based on the 1972 novel Boukenshatachi: Ganba to 15-hiki no Nakama (冒険者たち ガンバと15ひきの仲間, lit. The Adventurers: Gamba and His Fifteen Companions) by Atsuo Saitō and directed by Osamu Dezaki. Its 26 episodes were broadcast on Nippon TV between April 7 and September 29, 1975, and was animated by Tokyo Movie. The first film, a compilation feature returning to the title of the book the series was based on, was released on March 4, 1984, and was animated by Tokyo Movie Shinsha. The series has been adapted into a film, titled Ganba to Kawauso no Bouken (ガンバとカワウソの冒険; lit. The Adventures of Gamba and Otters), which was released in Japan on July 20, 1991, and again was animated by TMS. In March 2003, Bandai released a puzzle and action PlayStation game called Gamba no Bouken: The Puzzle Action.

A 3D CG animated film adaptation was released in Japan on October 10, 2015, titled Gamba: Gamba to Nakama-tachi (GAMBA ガンバと仲間たち), which was later released in the United States by Lionsgate and Grindstone Entertainment Group in 2017 that changed many character names under the title Air Bound. Prior to this, an English version was produced by SC Films International under the name Gamba 3D, and without character name changes.

== Plot ==
Gamba, a brown mouse, embarks on a sailing journey with his childhood friend. They gather experienced mice sailors at a harbour. They encounter Chūta, a mouse who has been injured and is seeking help. He appeals for Gamba and Bōbo to assist him in defending the island of Yumemishima and its inhabitants from the cruel and wicked invading Noroi Clan. Gamba elects to sail to Yumemishima with Chūta to help defend the island, and Gamba recruits more mice to join their cause on the island.

== Characters ==
Gamba (ガンバ, Ganba)
The town mouse, who calls himself "Ganbari-ya no Gamba" (がんばり屋のガンバ, "Gamba, the Eager Beaver"), he is always energetic, full of curiosity, and has a strong sense of justice. He takes a trip to show the sea to his close friend Bōbo, and meets Chūta at the harbor when they arrive. Gamba and his friends are out on a journey to heed the wishes of Chūta, to defeat Noroi who rules Noroi Island. He is renamed Gavin in Lionsgate's English film dub.
Bobo (ボーボ, Bōbo)
The Gamba's best friend, he is a gluttonous, green-furred and an easygoing town mouse. His name is the result of him being absentminded. His sensitive nose helps him to find food. He is made into a secondary character in the 2015 film.
Mampuku (マンプク, Manpuku)
A mouse who appears only in the 2015 film, he takes on Bobo's original role from the 70s anime. He is renamed Matthew in Lionsgate's English film dub.
Yoisho (ヨイショ)
The kind-hearted captain of sailor mice, he has a girlfriend named Yuri, is highly dependable and is calmer than Gamba. He lost his right eye to Noroi. He is renamed Rusty in Lionsgate's English film dub.
Gakusha (ガクシャ)
One of Yoisho's childhood friends, he is knowledgeable, clever, wears big glasses and has quite a short tail. He is renamed Grayson in Lionsgate's English film dub.
Shijin (シジン)
The wandering doctor mouse, every time he gets drunk, he reads poetry out loud. He also has sensitive ears that pick up sound the other mice cannot hear.
Ikasama (イカサマ)
Ikasama is a gambler and good at fraud. He is also called a "swift runner" because he is light-footed. He is renamed Ace in Lionsgate's English film dub.
Chuuta (忠太, Chuuta)
An insular mouse who comes to the town for help. He is a younger brother of Shioji. He is renamed Chester in Lionsgate's English film dub.
Noroi (ノロイ)
The leader weasel with snow-white fur and red eyes. He is a cruel and bloodthirsty killer and when his red eyes shine eerily in the dark, he can apply hypnotism. He is renamed Winston in Lionsgate's English film dub.
Shioji (潮路)
The granddaughter of the elder mouse Shuro from Yumemishima, and is an older sister of Chūta. She is renamed Shelly in Lionsgate's English film dub.
Toragoro (トラゴロー, Toragorō)
The traveler mouse who is on his way home from a ten year trip. He uses Gamba to avoid danger. He is modeled on Torajirō of "Otoko wa Tsurai yo".
Tsuburi (ツブリ)
The head of the streaked shearwaters. All of his subordinates, his wives, and his eggs were slaughtered by Noroi. Tsuburi is depicted as female in the film, and she is renamed Theresa in Lionsgate's English dub.

== Voice cast ==
=== TV show ===
1975 TV show
Character	Seiyu
Ganba	Masako Nozawa
Boobo	Ranko Mizuki
Noroi	Chikao Ootsuka
Shioji	Kazuko Yanaga
Yoisho	Kenji Utsumi
Gakusha	Kei Tomiyama
Shijin	Akira Shimada
Ikasama	Junko Hori
Chuuta	Hiroko Kikuchi
Toragorō	Ken'ichi Ogata
Tsuburi	Shunsuke Shima

=== 2015 film ===
2015 film
Role	Japanese	English	
Role	Japanese	SC Films International (2015)	Lionsgate (2017)
Role	Japanese	Passo Passo	Bang Zoom! Entertainment
Ganba	Yuki Kaji	Jack Merluzzi	Gavin
Ganba	Yuki Kaji	Jack Merluzzi	Nash Grier
Manpuku	Wataru Takagi	Ryan Drees	Matthew
Manpuku	Wataru Takagi	Ryan Drees	Jimmy Tatro
Shioji	Sayaka Kanda	Julia Yermakov	Shelly
Shioji	Sayaka Kanda	Julia Yermakov	Justine Ezarik
Noroi	Mansai Nomura	Michael Rhys	Winston
Noroi	Mansai Nomura	Michael Rhys	Jon Lovitz
Yoisho	Akio Ootsuka	Walter Roberts	Rusty
Yoisho	Akio Ootsuka	Walter Roberts	Imari Williams
Gakusha	Shuuichi Ikeda	Michael Rhys	Grayson
Gakusha	Shuuichi Ikeda	Michael Rhys	Crispin Freeman
Bobo	Yasuhiro Takato	Jeff Manning	Max Mittelman
Ikasama	Keiji Fujiwara	Eric Kelso	Ace
Ikasama	Keiji Fujiwara	Eric Kelso	Ray Chase
Chuuta	Akiko Yajima	Katie Adler	Chester
Chuuta	Akiko Yajima	Katie Adler	Michelle Ruff
Tsuburi	Masako Nozawa	Katie Adler	Theresa
Tsuburi	Masako Nozawa	Katie Adler	Wendee Lee
Chuuichi	Akio Nojima	Jeff Manning	Clarence
Chuuichi	Akio Nojima	Jeff Manning	Michael McConnohie
Shin'ichirou	Takashi Hikida	Ryan Drees	Shiloh
Shin'ichirou	Takashi Hikida	Ryan Drees	Kirk Thornton
Youichi	Yukitoshi Tokumoto	Eric Kelso	Owen
Youichi	Yukitoshi Tokumoto	Eric Kelso	Doug Erholtz

Additional voices:

- English (Lionsgate/ Bang Zoom! Entertainment): Amanda Celine Miller, Chris Hackney, Damien Haas, Dave Mallow, David W. Collins, Dorah Fine, Dorothy Elias-Fahn, Doug Stone, Erika Harlacher, Janice Kawaye, Jason Linere White, Jay Preston, Joseph J. Thomas, Kaiji Tang, Katelyn Gault, Keith Silverstein, Kyle Hebert, Lex Lang, Mark Whiten, Philece Sampler, Vernon Dew, Zeno Robinson

== Episode listing ==
No.	Title	Original release date
1	"Out to Sea, To Adventure!"; Transliteration: "Bōkenda umi e deyou!" (Japanese: 冒険だ海へ出よう!)	April 7, 1975
Tired of going hungry and being hunted, Gamba and Bōbo head to the harbor. Chūta, a wounded mouse has escaped from the notorious Noroi and only Gamba is willing to help him get back to Dreamer Island. Later he is joined by Bōbo, Yoisho, Gakusha, Shijin and Ikasama.
2	"Gamba Goes Nuts Onboard"; Transliteration: "Ganba, Fune de dai abare" (Japanese: ガンバ、船で大暴れ)	April 14, 1975
Gamba and Bōbo have trouble adjusting to the ship's rocking and become seasick. Chūta briefs the mouse crew about the carnage at the claws of the Noroi Clan, decimating his people that he needed to find the bravest of mice to combat the evil clan.
3	"Mission: Save Chūta!"; Transliteration: "Chūta o sukue! Dai sakusen" (Japanese: 忠太を救え! 大作戦)	April 21, 1975
With Chūta's condition worsening, Gamba and Bōbo with help from Ikasama procure some antibiotics, battling with an angry mouse gang and avoiding a vicious cat on the way. The three mice barely make it back to the departing ship, but Chūta is shortly cured.
4	"Battered by a Storm"; Transliteration: "Arashi ni yara rete mettameta" (Japanese: 嵐にやられてメッタメタ)	April 28, 1975
After the mice rescue Chūta from a cage trap, the ship soon gets caught in a storm. With the ship rapidly sinking, the mice are forced to jump overboard and swim away. Bobo is separated from the others, but they find him in a crate of apples.
5	"What Awaits on Battleship Island?"; Transliteration: "Nani ga tobidasu? Gunkantō" (Japanese: なにが飛び出す? 軍艦島)	May 5, 1975
Gamba and his friends are stranded on a rusty battleship with a Grouper guarding the only food source. After an exhausting day, Gamba lures the grouper away to the seagulls, allowing the mice to eat and finish Gakusha's new submarine invention.
6	"Fun, Fun Diving"; Transliteration: "Tanoshī tanoshī sensuikan" (Japanese: たのしいたのしい潜水艦)	May 12, 1975
While the submarine heads south, Yoisho tells the mice about his deadly encounter with Noroi, which cost him his right eye and was rescued by Gakusha. After a run in with a whale, the mice are shipwrecked on a rock spire. They swim their way to a nearby island.
7	"Scary, Scary Black Shadow"; Transliteration: "Bukimi na bukimi na kuroi kage" (Japanese: ぶきみなぶきみな黒い影)	May 19, 1975
As the mice begin to settle on the island, they are attacked by a shadow creature. The squirrels Creek and Iena tell them about the black fox Zakuri. Seeing the squirrels' situation similar to Chūta's, the mice decide to combat Zakuri.
8	"Bōbo's First Love"; Transliteration: "Bōbo ga hajimete koi o shita" (Japanese: ボーボが初めて恋をした)	May 26, 1975
After the mice narrowly escape Zakuri's trap, Creek is angered that the mice's actions have gotten two squirrels killed by Zakuri. Bōbo has developed a crush on Iena, but after she is taken by Zakuri, the mice and squirrels are determined to deal with Zakuri for good.
9	"Difficult Battle With the Black Fox"; Transliteration: "Kuro gitsune to no kurushī tatakai" (Japanese: 黒ギツネとの苦しい戦い)	June 2, 1975
The mice and squirrels pursue Zakuri, but they lose him. Ikasama learns the location of Zakuri's lair. As Bōbo lures Zakuri away, Creek rescues Iena. During a chase, Zakuri fatally wounds Creek, but he retaliates by skewering the black fox dead with a sharp stick.
10	"Seven Split Boards Going Their Separate Ways"; Transliteration: "Kajitte wakareta nanatsu no ikada" (Japanese: かじって別れた七つのイカダ)	June 9, 1975
The mice are relaxing in the ocean, until an oil tanker runs into them, losing Gamba who gets paralysed from a sprained tail. After a brief fight, the mice decide to look for Gamba by themselves. Gamba is rescued by a dolphin and the mice happily reunite at Tengu Rock.
11	"After Toragorō, The Swindler!"; Transliteration: "Petenshi Toragorō o oe!" (Japanese: ぺてん師トラゴローを追え!)	June 16, 1975
The mice are joined by a mouse named Toragorō, who wants to rejoin his family. Toragorō almost gets the mice killed, but then discovers that his family left him behind. Seeing how depressed he is, the mice forgive him and renew his ambition to look for his loved ones.
12	"A Party, A Fight, An Uproar"; Transliteration: "Matsurida kenkada ōsōdō" (Japanese: 祭りだ 喧嘩だ 大騒動)	June 23, 1975
The mice enter a town and are soon in the middle of a human festival. They all have fun except for Chūta, who wishes to return home. Chūta and Shijin are cornered by stray dogs, but their friends send the pack right into a crowd of humans.
13	"Special Training!! Operation Moo-moo"; Transliteration: "Tokkun!! Mōmō dai sakusen" (Japanese: 特訓!!モーモー大作戦)	June 30, 1975
The mice have a hard climb up the hills. In a field, they practice they fighting and stealth skills on a cow, with Gamba ultimately defeating it. Gamba lets his pride get to his head and puts himself and some of his friends in danger.
14	"Attack of a Pack of Hunting Dogs"; Transliteration: "Osoikakaru ryōken no mure" (Japanese: 襲いかかる猟犬の群れ)	July 7, 1975
After surviving a tornado, Gamba and his friends are met by a lost young rabbit Pyon. They are pursued by a hunter and his dogs and Pyon is captured. The mice rescue Pyon and bring him home, before resuming their journey.
15	"Gamba Kidnapped by an Eagle"; Transliteration: "Taka ni sarawa reta Ganba" (Japanese: 鷹にさらわれたガンバ)	July 14, 1975
After the mice scale Crow's Peak, Gamba is captured by an eagle. Gamba escapes, but sustains weakening injuries. A lonely mountaineer helps him to recuperate, allowing Gamba to continue his climb.
16	"Climbing Formidable Crow Peak!"; Transliteration: "Ma no karasu-dake o nobore!" (Japanese: 魔のカラス岳を登れ!)	July 21, 1975
Bobo, Ikasama and Chuta are attacked by a murder of crows, while Yoisho, Shijin and Gakusha are caught in an avalanche. Gamba comes to their rescue. Reunited, the seven mice finally reach the top of Crow's Peak.
17	"Run, Run, For the Weasel is Near"; Transliteration: "Hashire, hashire, Noroi wa chikai" (Japanese: 走れ走れノロイは近い)	July 28, 1975
On their descent from Crow's peak, the mice take it in turns to be group leader. When Bobo gets caught by a speeding train, they learn to work together and are able to rescue him and reach the coast.
18	"Curious, Fat Mice"; Transliteration: "Kimyōna futotta nezumi-tachi" (Japanese: 奇妙なふとったネズミたち)	August 4, 1975
The mice get some grain from a takakura, which is inhabited by large mice, who are revealed to be hiding in fear from Noroi. The large mice regain their courage when their leader Ichirou kills a ferocious cat to save Gamba.
19	"Streaked Shearwater Sinking in Darkness"; Transliteration: "Yami ni hisomu oomizunagi tori" (Japanese: 闇に潜むオオミズナギ鳥)	August 11, 1975
The mice are unable to cross the treacherous sea currents. They are met by seabirds led by Tsuburi, who were attacked by the weasels not so long ago. Aided by the seabirds, Gamba and his friends parachute on to Dreamer Island.
20	"We Saw a White Weasel!"; Transliteration: "Shiro itachi Noroi o mita!" (Japanese: 白イタチノロイを見た!)	August 18, 1975
The mice traverse around Dreamer Island, but are ambushed by killer weasels. Noroi calls off the weasels. Chuta's family is nowhere to be found and Noroi confronts the mice. Gamba and his friends barely make their escape.
21	"13 Eyes Wet With Tears"; Transliteration: "Namida ni nureta 13 no hitomi" (Japanese: 涙にぬれた13の瞳)	August 25, 1975
Noroi ambushes mice again. As they venture down a hole, Chuta is finally reunited with his family. The mouse colony make preparations for the weasels' imminent attack. Gamba gets hurt protecting Shioji from weasels, but the mice drive them away with sulfur.
22	"Friends from Across the Sea"; Transliteration: "Umi o watatte kita nakama" (Japanese: 海を渡って来た仲間)	September 1, 1975
Gamba sets off with Bobo, Yoisho and Gakusha. With aid from Ichirou's group, they get rice supplies. They receive further aid from a large addition of mouse survivors. Despite Noroi's interventions, they are able to get the supplies to the crater.
23	"Traitor Amid the Fortress"; Transliteration: "Uragiri no toride" (Japanese: 裏切りの砦)	September 8, 1975
As an abundance of mice take shelter in the fortress, the rice supply is destroyed and Ichirou falls to his death. It turns out Taichi is being forced to undermine the mice since Noroi is subjecting his little brother Junta to torture.
24	"The Whisper of the White Demon"; Transliteration: "Shiroi akumano sasayaki" (Japanese: 白い悪魔のささやき)	September 15, 1975
The mouse population is forced to evacuate and they relocate to a sea cove. Noroi attempts to bait the mice into turning themselves over, but Taichi sacrifices himself to bring the mice back to their senses.
25	"Hell's Grotto"; Transliteration: "Jigoku no iwaana" (Japanese: 地獄の岩穴)	September 22, 1975
While attempting to gather food Gamba, Yoisho and the Elder mouse are ambushed by weasels but are rescued by Tsuburi, who provides all the mice with food. Shortly the weasels launch an attack. The battle is won, but the Elder is fatally wounded. Gakasha realises that tonight is the time the waters of the sea are calm.
26	"The Great Spiral: Our Final Battle"; Transliteration: "Saigonotatakai dai uzumaki" (Japanese: 最後の戦い大うずまき)	September 29, 1975
The mice swim across the sea to the safety of a far island. Gamba and his friends distract the weasels, while Chuta looks for Tsuburi. Tsuburi and the seabirds rescue the mice, while the weasels all perish in whirlpools. Noroi survives and attempts one last attack on the mice, but Gamba and his friends bite him to death. Chuta remains with his family, while Gamba sets sail back to Tokyo with his friends.

== Music ==
=== Opening theme ===
"Gamba no uta" (The Gamba Song)

- Lyrics – Tokyo Movie Planning Department
- Composition / Arrangement – Takeo Yamashita
- Singer – Sabu Kawahara
- Label – CBS/Sony Records

=== Ending theme ===
"Boukenshatachi no Ballad" (The Ballad of the Adventurer)

- Lyrics – Tokyo Movie Planning Department
- Composition / Arrangement – Takeo Yamashita
- Singer – Yoshihiro Sugiura
- Label – CBS/Sony Records

=== Insert song ===
"Hayasegawa no Uta" (Hayasegawa's Song)

- Lyrics – Atsuo Saitō
- Composition / Arrangement – Takeo Yamashita
- Singer – Kōko Kagawa (Episode 1), Kazuko Yanaga (Episode 21 & 25)

"Kaze no Sekai" (Windy World)

- Lyrics / Composition – Taeko Onuki
- Arrangement – Tatsuro Yamashita
- Singer – Sugar Babe

This song is played on episode 15 when the man in the mountain hut turns on the radio.

== Reception ==
In a 2006 poll of Japanese celebrities conducted by TV Asahi, Gamba no Bouken was ranked as respondents' 22nd favorite TV anime out of 100, beating many other series including: One Piece, Naruto, Dragon Ball, Evangelion, and Fullmetal Alchemist. In 2013, anime director Kenji Kamiyama, most known for the Ghost in the Shell: Stand Alone Complex series, cited the original anime among the 15 best anime of all time.
