= Battle Arena Toshinden (Game Boy video game) =

1996 video game

- Developer: Betop
- Publishers: JP: Takara; NA: Nintendo
- Series: Battle Arena Toshinden
- Platform: Game Boy
- Release: JP: March 22, 1996; NA: November 1996
- Genre: Fighting
- Modes: Single-player, multiplayer

Battle Arena Toshinden (Note: Japanese: 熱闘闘神伝, Hepburn: Nettō Den) is a 1996 fighting video game for the Game Boy. It is a version of Battle Arena Toshinden (1995) with the same choice of characters, but done in a two-dimensional playfield instead of the original 3D game. Like the original, the game is set during a secret fighting tournament, with each character having unique motives to enter the tournament. Some new characters are added to this game, while some others are given different motives to battle. This stylized version of the game was part of the Nettō series, which featured more light-hearted versions of the characters.

As a fighting game, players battle each other with kicks, punches and special moves while dodging their opponents' attacks to drain their power meter. Each character has unique abilities. The game also features an invisible barrier on the sides of the screen, which, when breached three times, results in the player losing the battle.

While a reviewer in Mega Fun complimented the controls and ability to implement a fighting game on Game Boy hardware, reviews in Famicom Tsūshin found the game to be an ordinary fighting game that would lack functional competitiveness due to it being on the Game Boy. Other reviewers commented on the tone of the game as being laughably ridiculous from Nintendo Power compared to the more serious nature of the original game.

== Gameplay ==
Players choose between eight characters, each of which has special moves. The player controls a chosen fighter that can move forwards and backwards as well as jump, and move towards and away from their opponents. They can kick, punch, taunt, and throw opponents as well as dash and backstep, which can be used to move out of an opponent's way or throw off their attack. Dodging can be used to dodge all attacks except throws.

Each player can also perform special moves when their strength gauge is flashing by moving the directional pad and pressing both Game Boy buttons simultaneously. Each character has special moves which can be done by entering certain button combinations during a battle. There are invisible ropes around the fighting arena that prevent you from falling out of the ring. The ropes can only support each character three times before failing to prevent a fall. Falling out of a ring makes that character lose the match.

In tournament mode, players go through all eight fighters and then challenge the boss. Players can choose between story mode, where they choose a fighter and battle through all fighters to win the tournament. Other options include a single battle against a CPU-controlled character or a two-player battle in which each player chooses a character to face off against an opponent. The two-player mode is available for two players with two copies of the game or two players with two Super Nintendo Entertainment System controllers playing on a Super Game Boy.

Fights in the game can be modified to different difficulty levels, such as the amount of time in a round and the number of rounds.

== Plot ==
The game is set during a secret fighters' tournament held every few years. The organization that arranged the tournament has selected its participants in advance.

Each of the fighters in the game has their own reason for entering the tournament. Some motivations changed from the original game, such as Sofia looking to recover her lost memories in the first game, while in this game she does not have a boyfriend and looks to the tournament to "capture fighting men".

== Development ==
Battle Arena Toshinden is a conversion of the 3D video game Battle Arena Toshinden (1995) for the PlayStation. In addition to the final bosses, Ghaia and Sho from the original 3D game, two new characters, Ghaia 2 and Uranus, are included.

This Game Boy version of Battle Arena Toshinden was developed by Betop. The characters have also been modified to be what Sandrie Souleiman of Mega Fun described as "cutesy" and "Japanese-styled graphics", with their heads taking up a third of their body. These stylized versions of games were part of the Nettō (Note: 熱闘シリーズ; lit. 'Hot Fight series') series of games which began with a port of Samurai Shodown (1993) that was released in 1994. A Famitsu reviewer described these games as having a more light-hearted tone than the originals.

== Release and reception ==
Reception

Review scores
Publication	Score
The Electric Playground	9/10
Famicom Tsūshin	5/10, 5/10, 5/10, 5/10
Game Informer	8/10
Hobby Consolas	85/100
Mega Fun	80%
Player One	90%
Nintendo Magazine System	90%
Super Play	36/100
Total!	88%
Ultra Player	6/6

Battle Arena Toshinden was released for the Game Boy in Japan on March 22, 1996. It was released in English by Nintendo in November 1996.

A reviewer in Nintendo Power described it as a fun two-player game and noted that it benefited from quality enhancements when played on the Super Game Boy. They said it lacked challenge in tournament mode and the in-game text was "laughable" and occasionally resembled a bad fortune cookie. A reviewer in Total! echoed the comments on dialogue saying it felt like a poor translation. Reviewers in the Japanese magazine Famicom Tsūshin said the tone of the game made it feel like fan-fiction or a parody of the original series.

Two reviewers in Famicom Tsūshin complimented the graphics of the game, saying it made it easy to see what moves were being used and that the character's subtle gestures and movements were reproduced impressively. In the German gaming magazine Total, complimenting precise controls and a versatile roster of characters and gameplay modes. While finding the characters a bit too small, they said the graphics were still very stylish.

Sandrie Souleiman of Mega Fun found the controls proved to be very responsive and precise. Souleiman concluded that what the developers managed to get out of the Game Boy hardware deserves recognition. Chris Pottier of Ultra Player complimented the game for "outstanding depth". One reviewer in Famicom Tsūshin said that it just felt like an ordinary fighting game, while another said that it would be hard to take it as a serious competitive game due to the limitations of the Game Boy hardware.

In Game Informer and Pottier in Player One it was described as being one of the best fighting games for the Game Boy along with World Heroes 2 Jet (1995). Other reviewers in Player One said it was slightly edged out by the Game Boy version of World Heroes 2 Jet as that title featured more characters. Simon Clays of Nintendo Magazine System found Battle Arena Toshinden inferior to Killer Instinct (1995) for the Game Boy saying it was too easy for his liking. A reviewer in Total! echoed this saying it was inferior to the Game boy Killer Instinct and would be inferior to any major fighting game on consoles, but feels like a full-sized game for the Game Boy.

In his book The Game Boy Encyclopedia, Chris Scullion said that "as far as Game Boy fighting games go, it's competent enough." He also added that the game lacked gameplay elements of the original game that were original to the genre, such as the side-step ability.

== See also ==
- 1996 in video games
- List of Game Boy games
