= Battle Arena Toshinden (video game) =

1995 video game

- North American PlayStation box art featuring characters Eiji and Mondo
- Developer: Tamsoft: Digital Dialect (MS-DOS)
- Publishers: Takara: JP: Takara; WW: Sony Computer Entertainment (PS); WW: Sega (Saturn); NA: Playmates Interactive Entertainment (MS-DOS); EU: Funsoft (MS-DOS)
- Director: Shintarō Nakaoka
- Producer: Takayuki Nakano
- Programmer: Hiroaki Furukawa
- Composers: Yasuhiro Nakano, Makoto Mukai, Fumio Tanabe
- Series: Battle Arena Toshinden
- Engine: Hyper Solid
- Platforms: PlayStation, Saturn, MS-DOS
- Release: January 1, 1995: PlayStation; JP: January 1, 1995; NA: September 9, 1995; EU: September 29, 1995 Saturn (Remix); JP: November 24, 1995; NA: March 27, 1996; EU: March 29, 1996 MS-DOS; NA: April 22, 1996; EU: 1996 PS3/Vita/PSP; JP: November 22, 2016
- Genre: Fighting
- Modes: Single-player, multiplayer

Battle Arena Toshinden, released as Toh Shin Den (Note: Japanese: 闘神伝; roughly meaning 'tale of the fighting gods') (Note: Originally romanized as Toh Shin Den before its Western localization had it changed to the Toshinden spelling. Some material (such as the manga) were inconsistently romanized as Toushinden and Tohshinden. Abbreviated as either BAT or TSD.) in Japan, is a 1995 fighting video game developed by Tamsoft and published by Takara for the PlayStation. The first game of its respective series, it was one of the first fighting games, after Virtua Fighter on arcade and console, to boast polygonal characters in a 3D environment, and features a sidestep maneuver which is credited for taking the genre into "true 3D."

Toy giant Takara produced the game during a six-month period in 1994 as their first original video game, together with new developer Tamsoft, both of whom had worked on porting Samurai Showdown and other SNK fighters to consoles. Initially made to be a PlayStation exclusive, the game was released in Japan a few weeks after the console's debut, and released internationally by Sony Computer Entertainment as a launch title. Its American division had promoted it as a "Saturn killer" (against Sega's Virtua Fighter), but ironically a Saturn port published by Sega, titled Battle Arena Toshinden Remix and with additional features, was released less than a year later. A version for MS-DOS was also released.

A weapons-based fighter, Toh Shin Den features eight anime-style characters — the work of Tsukasa Kotobuki — and has gameplay mechanics such as special and projectile attacks akin to 2D fighters like the Street Fighter series. Critically acclaimed for graphical innovations like gouraud shading and transparent effects, Toh Shin Den was a popular early title on the PlayStation and it spawned sequels starting with Battle Arena Toshinden 2, as well as manga and anime adaptations. However, a lackluster reception to its sequels meant that it was overshadowed by Namco's Tekken series, especially with Tekken 2, and it fell in popularity. The weapons concept was then further popularized by Soul Edge.

== Gameplay ==
Gameplay screenshot on PlayStation (Sofia vs. Ellis)

Each character has their own unique set of basic moves, special attacks, and a desperation attack that can only be used when the player has low energy (around 10% or less). The player can move around the arenas using the L/R shoulder buttons, which can be used to dodge projectile attacks or get away from a dangerous spot.

Players move using the directional pad. Holding the backward directional button allows the player to block basic attacks and reduces most of the damage from opponents' special moves. Players can also run by quickly tapping the forward directional button.

As with other games of the genre, the player wins by depleting the opposing players health, having more health than their opponent if the time runs out, or knocking their opponent out of the non-walled arena. Unlike many fighting games of the time, it was possible for a player character to accidentally fall off the arena with a miss-timed run or special move, resulting in some unique tactics.

The main single-player mode only consists of battles against all characters followed by the boss, while the other mode is for a single battle against an opponent chosen by the player. However the enhanced Remix version on Sega Saturn does have a story mode.

== Plot and characters ==
Throughout the criminal underworld, announcements of a famed underworld tournament reemerging after a long hiatus has made word throughout the globe. Known as the Battle Arena Toshinden, this underworld tournament is a weapons fighting tournament broadcast as bloodsport entertainment for an elite and interested audience. Hosted by a mysterious organization known only as the Secret Society, believed to be related to a world leading multinational megaconglomerate, the Gerard Foundation, the Secret Society has picked eight worthy challengers from around the world to pit against each other for the chance at a prize for fortune, fame, and glory.

Initial playable characters are:

- Eiji Shinjo (エイジ・シンジョウ) - The main protagonist of the series. A young Japanese traveling swordsman/adventurer who seeks to find his long-lost older brother, Sho. Eiji progresses through the tournament and ultimately comes face-to-face with the tournament's sponsor, the mysterious Gaia
- Kayin Amoh (カイン・アモウ) - A Scottish (later retconned as English) swordsman/bounty hunter, a friend and rival of Eiji. He seeks to avenge the death of his foster father, who was killed by the previous tournament's champion from last year.
- Sofia (ソフィア) - A whip-wielding blonde Russian woman who works as a private detective. She seeks to find and recover her long-lost memories.
- Run-go Iron (ラングー・アイアン) - A strong yet kind-hearted American miner who seeks to rescue his wife Lila and his son Christopher from the Secret Society.
- Fo Fai (ホー・ファイ) - An elderly Chinese magician who is secretly a cold-hearted serial killer. Fo Fai enters the tournament to satisfy his bloodlust.
- Mondo (門土; モンド) - An emotionless Japanese ninja warrior who infiltrates the tournament under the orders from a rival group of the Secret Society.
- Duke B. Rambert (デューク・バルテルミ・ランバート) - An arrogant French knight who seeks to find and defeat Eiji to avenge a past loss to him.
- Ellis (エリス) - A cheerful and kind-hearted Turkish orphaned dancer of a traveling theater troupe who seeks to discover whether or not her long-lost missing father is still alive.

Unlockable characters:

- Gaia (ガイア) - The sponsor of the tournament, boss of the game, and main antagonist. His reasons for holding the tournament in the first place are shrouded in mystery. He is later revealed to be the father of Ellis.
- Sho Shinjo (ショウ) - The secret final boss of the game, reached by clearing the game without continues. The champion from last year's previous tournament and Eiji's older brother, he is a merciless swordsman who holds nothing back from within the fights that he participates in.
- Cupido (Sega Saturn version) - A mysterious woman who speaks with cryptic riddles and messages. Her past is shrouded in mystery, and not much is known about her. She is the "true" final boss in this version.
- Earthworm Jim (PC version, rendered in Japanese as "ジム") - A guest character. His attacks are identical to those of Rungo Iron.

== Development and release ==
Battle Arena Toshinden was developed by Tamsoft, an in-house developer part of the Takara toy company and their first original game. Takara had been concepting Toshinden on a different platform before Sony's announcement in late 1993 of releasing a new hardware system, after which Takara decided to develop the game specifically on Sony's PlayStation platform. Development took under six months. Programming began at the end of May 1994 and there were 25 people working on it by the end of development.

According to Takara executives, about 1,000 polygons were used for each character. The inspiration of some of the characters came from the Japanese tradition of bushido; Takara had already published SNK titles including Samurai Showdown based on similar themes. Toshinden's 3D environment naturally drew comparisons with Virtua Fighter. In an interview, Takara boasted that the game had more realistic three-dimensionality:

Virtua Fighter uses 3D characters, but the fights and attacks take place on one plane, in the same direct line. In contrast, Toh Shin Den uses all the dimensions of the screen (X, Y, and Z), and attacks can be made to the side or behind the enemy. It is also possible to circle the opponent.

The November 1994 issue of Japanese magazine Game Blast noted that the game was 30% completed, although the game was completed shortly before the console's domestic debut on December 3, 1994, with a release on January 1, 1995. Magazines just before the time of its release also named it Hyper Solid Toshinden. In September 1995 the game was released in North American and PAL regions as a launch title. This version has slightly altered music and re-done the English voices, with the character Sofia sounding less suggestive and Ellis sounding older than in the original Japanese version.

=== Toshinden Remix on Saturn ===
At E3 1995 before the American PlayStation release, Battle Arena Toshinden was promoted as a "Saturn killer" to be a rival to the Sega Saturn. After Polygon Man was dropped, Sony Computer Entertainment America used the Toshinden character Sofia as a mascot. Despite this, Takara later announced that the game is to be ported by Nextech/Sega to the Sega Saturn as Toh Shin Den S in Japan and as Battle Arena Toshinden Remix internationally. A few new features were added, including an exclusive new character named Cupido and a story mode with dialog and voice acting (also dubbed in English), which enables the player to learn a few details about the characters' story backgrounds and the reasons of why they had entered into the tournament. The character select screen depicts original anime art by Tsukasa Kotobuki instead of rendered models and these also appear in the story mode. Work on the Saturn port reportedly began while the PlayStation original was still in development.

=== PC ports ===
California-based Digital Dialect reprogrammed the game for MS-DOS, and this version was released in 1996 published by Playmates Interactive. This version plays and looks differently. Earthworm Jim, which was the property of Playmates, was added as an exclusive guest character, with his unique arena music, but he only uses the moves of Rungo Iron. It uses the Japanese PlayStation version's voices and music in all regions, albeit at lower sound quality. The DOS version also supports resolutions up to 640x480 and network multiplayer using IPX/SPX or NetBIOS.

An emulated version for the PlayStation Network was released as a downloadable PlayStation game on November 22, 2016, in Japan. The game was also re-released in 2018 on the PlayStation Classic. Specifically it is the PAL version which runs slower at 50 Hz.

=== Cover art ===
The game had different and distinct box art for every release and region. The original release in Japan came with an outer paper box depicting many of the characters in anime, illustrated by Tsukasa Kotobuki who also did the Toshinden manga art. The base cover itself had the Toshinden logo against a blue background with text in English boasting its "90,000 polygons per second". On the other hand, the American cover featured Eiji and Mondo in battle, albeit looking significantly different than their actual looks. The PAL version box art was drawn by Paul Kidby and depicts a shield-like symbol with a sword and dragon; Kidby had stated that he was not provided with any screenshots of the actual game. Meanwhile, the DOS release depicts Sofia and Duke with their weapons against a dusk city background, and the Game Boy release in all regions is a colorful depiction of all characters deformed and closer to their anime drawings. The Saturn releases (Toshinden Remix and Toshinden S) also had their own box arts: a large depiction of Eiji above anime figures of other characters in the Japanese release; a sword and burning fire in the North American release; and Eiri, Duke, Rungo and Fo on the PAL cover.

=== Soundtrack ===
Background music was composed by Yasuhiro Nakano and Makoto Mukai. A soundtrack CD featuring arranged versions by the original composers, Toh Shin Den Retake & Remix, was released by Sony Records in April 1995. Bach is credited on Sho's theme track as it contains a segment from Toccata and Fugue in D minor. The original game's music was also re-arranged for the game's global PlayStation release in September 1995.

== Reception ==
Contemporary reception (PlayStation)

Review scores
Publication	Score
Dragon	3/5
Electronic Gaming Monthly	8.5/10, 7.5/10, 8/10, 8.5/10
EP Daily	10/10
Famitsu	7/10, 8/10, 8/10, 7/10
Game Informer	8.5/10
Game Players	98%
GamePro	18/20; 17/20
GamesMaster	88%
Hyper	92%
Next Generation	4/5
Dengeki PlayStation	90/100, 85/100, 85/100, 85/100
Game Amusement Pleasure	94%
Maximum	3/5

Award
Publication	Award
Electronic Gaming Monthly	Best Fighting Game of 1995

=== Sales ===
In Japan, Battle Arena Toshinden sold 696,851 units for the PlayStation. Upon the PlayStation's launch in the United States, Toshinden sold out in its first week on sale. The game, as well as Ridge Racer, sold at a nearly one-to-one ratio per hardware system in the United States by the end of 1995. The game went on to sell 532,724 units for the PlayStation in the United States, including 327,412 standalone copies and 205,312 bundled copies. Battle Arena Toshinden was included in the Greatest Hits range for having sold more than 150,000 units in the United States. The PlayStation version sold a total of 1,229,575 units in Japan and the United States.

According to Next Generation, the Saturn release had "disappointing sales" in Japan, which they attributed to the strong association of the game with the PlayStation (due to the use of the character Ellis in Japanese ads for the PlayStation) and its weak use of the Saturn hardware when compared to Virtua Fighter 2. Battle Arena Toshinden Remix for the Saturn sold 84,231 units in Japan, bringing combined sales of the PlayStation and Saturn versions to at least 1,313,806 units sold in Japan and the United States.

=== Contemporary reviews ===
Battle Arena Toshinden was critically acclaimed when released. Electric Playground gave the game a perfect score of 10 out of 10 in 1995. In an early 1995 interview, when asked which PlayStation game he was most impressed with so far, Ken Kutaragi answered Battle Arena Toshinden. There was also a positive reception to the game's characters and their weapons; in particular, the young character Ellis with her outfit and see-through parts.

GamePro reviewed the Japanese version of the game in early 1995 (prior to the PlayStation's launch in the U.S.). They remarked that the game is very impressive, and superior to Virtua Fighter in some aspects, but also flawed in several respects. They particularly praised the texture-mapped polygon graphics, original fighters, myriad moves, unique style of play, and the sidestep move, commenting that "the only problem with this slick defensive move is that from some viewing angles, the fighters obstruct the front of the screen, making it impossible to see where a move is coming from". Their review of the later U.S. release was also generally positive; they praised the graphics, stage design, playability, and dynamic camera, but criticized the game for being simplistic and easy, remarking that "this game relies more on flash than fighting". They summarized the game as "an enjoyable fight". Next Generation also reviewed the game prior to the PlayStation's U.S. launch. They commented that while the gameplay lacks originality and good reaction speed, the 3D aesthetics and graphics make it a much more powerful experience to play than a typical 2D fighter. However, they concluded that the game loses "by a hair" when compared to its rival, Virtua Fighter. On the other hand, Hyper magazine rated Toshinden higher than Virtua Fighter.

The four reviewers of Electronic Gaming Monthly gave the game a positive review, chiefly praising the character design, graphics, and special moves. Battle Arena Toshinden was awarded Best Fighting Game of 1995 by Electronic Gaming Monthly.

Maximum made note of the graphical and gameplay innovations such as gouraud shading, rotational backgrounds, dramatic camera angles, and the sidestep. They however remarked that the poor quality directional pad on the original PlayStation controller "just isn't built for taking diagonals and quarter circle rolls", making it irritatingly difficult to pull off special moves. Though they assessed the game as good overall, they advised gamers to instead hold out for the PlayStation port of Tekken, which they felt to be far superior in every respect. Dragon gave the game 3 out of 5 stars.

=== Ports and retrospective reviews ===
Ports and retrospective reviews

Aggregate scores
Aggregator	Score		
Aggregator	PC	PS	Saturn
GameRankings	68% (5 reviews)		
Metacritic		69/100 (4 reviews)	

Review scores
Publication	Score		
Publication	PC	PS	Saturn
Electronic Gaming Monthly			21/40
GameSpot	6/10		
IGN		7/10	
Next Generation			3/5
Maximum			2/5
Sega Saturn Magazine			80%
Game Players			81%

Later reviews from 1996 onwards, for later ports as well as retrospective reviews of the PlayStation version, have been generally mixed. In 1996, IGN gave the game a score of 7 out of 10, by which time it was seen as slow and "not as impressive" as the more recent Tekken 2, though they praised Toshinden for important innovations to the fighting game genre, such as taking "the fighter into true 3-D" and "one little move" that "changed the fighter forever" with the introduction of sidestep movement.

The Sega Saturn version was not as well-received as the PlayStation original. The four reviewers of Electronic Gaming Monthly complained of the fact that the graphics were not improved from the PlayStation version, and felt that the game was overshadowed by the recent release of Battle Arena Toshinden 2. While Rob Allsetter of Sega Saturn Magazine greatly praised the visuals of the game and judged the button configuration to be superior to that of the PlayStation version, he criticized the "slow" gameplay and the limited variety of moves, concluding that Battle Arena Toshinden is "still decent enough, but ... lacks the speed and depth of its more illustrious successors". A reviewer for Next Generation said that the visuals of the Japanese release were not up to par with those of the PlayStation version, and advised Saturn owners to wait for the U.S. release in hopes that Sega of America would fix the graphical shortcomings. GamePro's Tommy Glide commented that there is not enough additional content in the Saturn version and the graphics do not look as smooth as the PlayStation version's, assessing it as overall "a poor conversion". Maximum's Rich Leadbetter stated that it fails to recreate the graphical effects of the PlayStation original, which he opined were the only saving grace of an extremely dull game. He held the additional character and the PAL conversion's lack of borders to be its only advantages over the PlayStation version.

During the 200th issue leadup of Electronic Gaming Monthly in 2005, they ranked Battle Arena Toshinden as their single most overrated game. They explained that it "was 3D, it was flashy--Battle Arena Toshinden was exciting and new. But later Namco showed us what really could be done with 3D fighting on the PlayStation (Tekken, Soul Blade). (...) But is it actually good? Oh God, no". Following the game's release on PlayStation Classic in 2018, Jamie O'Neill was critical of "slow, unresponsive controls for moves like Special Attacks" and the lack of any story mode, but praised the "energetic" soundtrack and the innovative ability of circling opponents.
