= Polygon Man =

Short lived marketing character for PlayStation in North America

- PlayStation character
- The original design of Polygon Man from 1995
- First appearance: E3 1995
- First game: PlayStation All-Stars Battle Royale (2012)
- Created by: Chiat/Day; Steve Race

Polygon Man was an early marketing character for Sony's PlayStation in North America. Created in 1995 by advertising company Chiat/Day and then-Sony Computer Entertainment America (SCEA) president Steve Race, the character was meant to be an "edgy" spokesperson for the console and target audiences that they feared would be put off by the PlayStation name. Appearing in print advertisements and heavily at the 1995 Electronic Entertainment Expo, global head of the PlayStation brand Ken Kutaragi reacted negatively to the character, feeling it not only misrepresented the PlayStation's abilities but also that funds had been used on an alternative brand. The character was quickly shelved, replaced with the character Sofia from Battle Arena Toshinden while SCEA considered other character options.

Reception to Polygon Man was negative, with publications calling him "scary" and feeling it was a poor way to market the console to consumers. However, others voiced approval for the campaign and saw it as Sony attempting to reach teenage audiences through it. The character later appeared as the final boss of the 2012 fighting game PlayStation All-Stars Battle Royale, with sources such as PlayStation LifeStyle feeling he was a poor fit for the title and too similar to Super Smash Bros. character Master Hand, while others such as Edge appreciated the humor brought by the character and the acknowledgement of the schism between the North American and Japanese branches of Sony Computer Entertainment. He has since appeared in other titles and promotions, such as in 2022 for a digital collectible statue in Sony's "PlayStation Stars" loyalty program.

== History ==
In 1995, when preparing for the unveiling of the PlayStation console to North American audiences during that year's Electronic Entertainment Expo, or "E3", regional branches of Sony Computer Entertainment (SCE) came into conflict with the Japanese branch over how the console was going to be marketed. Market research had shown their consumers had reacted negatively to the PlayStation name and wanted to use "PSX", a contraction of the console's codename. Concerns were raised to SCE president Teruhisa Tokunaka, who dismissed them, noting a similar initial reaction to the Sony Walkman. However, at the American branch (SCEA), president Steve Race was still concerned, and felt the console would need an "edgy feel" to sell it to North American audiences.

Chiat/Day, SCEA's advertising agency had conducted consumer research and identified a target age for their market of 17, with younger consumers wanting to be that age while older consumers wanted to feel that age again. The American branch sought to aim their advertising at that audience, and created the characters of "Polygon Man" to this end. Influenced by Sega's successful anarchic "Pirate TV" campaign in the United Kingdom, Polygon Man's appearance was a floating, purple disembodied head with glowing yellow pupils in black eye sockets and spikes protruding from his scalp. In an interview with Electronic Gaming Monthly, Race stated the character "from a U.S. perspective was the kind of spokescharacter that was leading edge. He never was expected to be a central character like a Mario but rather to be a master gamer who was hip and rather edgy". Prior to E3, print advertisements were run featuring the character alongside full two page previews for games that would launch with the PlayStation, with a speech bubble above Polygon Man's head making a quip related to the game. Meanwhile, at the event itself, press kits, billboards and booth signage featured the character with a speech balloon stating in Japanese "ハマリ度MAX" (lit. 'Addictive to the MAX').

However, Ken Kutaragi, global head of the PlayStation brand, reacted particularly harshly to seeing the character for the first time at E3. He was particularly critical of the PlayStation's limited budget being used on an alternative brand, but also the presentation of the character itself, which used flat shading instead of the Gouraud shading the PlayStation utilized. SCE had intended minimalist branding for the console, and according to Chris Deering, former head of PlayStation Europe, they interpreted the advertising campaign as the American branch fighting against the PlayStation brand. Race stated on the matter "There was a large disagreement. [...] the Japanese thought it got in the way of the Sony brand. The Sony brand stands on its own—it never uses a character or celebrity endorsement, so culturally I didn't get that." Due to the Japanese branch having the final vote on the matter, the character was shelved and temporarily replaced with Sofia from Battle Arena Toshinden in the next print advertisement. Additionally, previous advertisements were quickly re-run with the same text but Polygon Man removed. Race in an interview with GameFan stated afterward he sought other characters to serve as "spokepeople" for the PlayStation, even reaching out to Marvel Comics before he ultimately left SCEA.

=== In video games ===
In 2012, Polygon Man resurfaced as the main antagonist and final boss of fighting game PlayStation All-Stars Battle Royale. In an interview with IGN, game director Omar Kendall stated that while considering a final boss for the game, several concepts were considered, including the Helghan Army from the franchise Killzone. However upon consideration they decided rather than having a single intellectual property serve as they game's antagonist, "we wanted the final challenge to be against the entire PlayStation brand itself". Describing Polygon Man as "the ultimate manifestation of PlayStation", they felt he represented the system due to his grandiose statements in advertisements that came across not representing him as a villain but "the power and potential and what PlayStation represents", and further representing the game's events as happening within the "world" of the console itself. When asked about his inclusion, Sony executive Shuhei Yoshida stated that by that time "no one really cared" about the past objections to the character.

In game, Polygon Man will transform into a stage hazard seen previously in the game's stages and attack the arena, while the player must fight an AI-controlled opponent from the roster. Once the opponent defeated, Polygon Man will revert to his original form and ram the stage at which point the player may damage him. Afterwards the process repeats, with the player fighting now two opponents, then three. After Polygon Man is damaged a third time he explodes and the player character absorbs the energy within him as the game ends. Though the character has spoken dialogue, no voice actor is credited as Polygon Man in the game's credits sequence.

In 2022, a digital statue of Polygon Man was included in a series of "digital collectibles" as part of Sony's "PlayStation Stars" loyalty program. The collectible was obtainable by partaking in one of the program's campaigns, and afterward could be displayed on one's profile in the related smartphone app. In the 2024 video game Astro Bot, one of the characters called Forgotten Mascot is modeled after Polygon Man. Polygon Man makes a cameo in the 2026 fighting game Marvel Tokon: Fighting Souls, as a projectile thrown by the character Deadpool in one of his attacks.

== Critical reception ==
As a mascot, Polygon Man was poorly received, with PlayStation Magazine commenting that "a lot of consumers found him way too creepy." They elaborated further in a later issue, with Randy Nelson calling the campaign one of PlayStation's biggest blunders and adding "We'd bet there are still people at Sony Computer Entertainment that, to this day, still wonder the same thing we do: What the hell were they thinking?" Nelson further stated the character "looked scary, displayed no emotion, and shouted meaningless phrases in Japanese. That's how you sell your totally unproven game system". Other outlets shared similar sentiments, with the staff of Edge magazine calling the ad campaign "tacky" and describing Polygon Man as "surely the antithesis of PlayStation's abilities". Kotaku's Carolyn Petit echoed a similar statement, calling the character "a sloppy jumble of spikes whose aim was apparently to depict the system as a home for ugly 3D character models." Jeremy Parish, in an article for Electronic Gaming Monthly, felt that Sony "mercifully came to their senses" by ditching the character prior to the PlayStation's North American release, and further stated "Farewell Polygon Man. We'd miss you, except you sucked."

Sebastian Moss and Dan Oravasaari of PlayStation Lifestyle both bemoaned the reveal of Polygon Man as the antagonist of PlayStation All-Stars Battle Royale, with Moss in particular noting that the choice was baffling due to not only the North American exclusivity of the campaign, but also concerns that the reference would go over the heads of much of the game's target demographic. More importantly Moss emphasized that Sony themselves had rejected the character, adding "Polygon Man didn't represent [PlayStation graphics], and he shouldn't represent [PlayStation All-Stars Battle Royale]." Oravasaari, on the other hand, felt that while those concerns were minor, the character reminded him too much of the character Master Hand from Nintendo's Smash Bros., a franchise he felt the game was trying to distance itself from. He further added that while Sony did not have a particular main flagship title, other characters from PlayStation-related titles would have made better choices and still fit the game's identity.

Not all the reception was negative, with Game Players magazine stating that the campaign had "dominated" E3, and the staff saddened to see it stopped. The book The Golden Age of Video Games cited the ad campaign as a positive example of Sony's willingness to "address the teenage crowd" in a direct and aggressive manner, and the staff of Official U.S. PlayStation Magazine stated that while those who recalled Polygon Man "have few kind words to say about him", in light of the showings from Sony's competitors at E3 1995 they felt the company's advertising "seemed remarkably strong." Eurogamer's Simon Parkin praised the character's role as the villain and final boss of PlayStation All-Stars Battle Royale, and Edge called him "a wonderful symbol of the schisms that characterise both Sony's corporate structure and the game that has been designed to celebrate its output" and demonstrated welcome self-deprecating humor on the part of the developers.
