= Super Smash Bros. Ultimate =

2018 video game

- The game's box art, showcasing some of its large playable roster
- Developers: Bandai Namco Studios; Sora Ltd.
- Publisher: Nintendo
- Director: Masahiro Sakurai
- Producers: Shinya Saito; Yoshito Higuchi
- Programmer: Tetsuya Otaguro
- Artist: Yusuke Nakano
- Composer: Hideki Sakamoto
- Series: Super Smash Bros.
- Platform: Nintendo Switch
- Release: December 7, 2018
- Genre: Fighting
- Modes: Single-player, multiplayer

Super Smash Bros. Ultimate (Note: Known in Japan as Great Melee Smash Bros. Special (Japanese: 大乱闘スマッシュブラザーズ SPECIAL, Hepburn: Dai Rantō Sumasshu Burazāzu Supesharu)) is a 2018 crossover fighting game developed by Bandai Namco Studios and Sora Ltd. and published by Nintendo for the Nintendo Switch. It is the fifth (Note: Ultimate is also considered the sixth installment in the series, as Super Smash Bros. for Nintendo 3DS and Wii U are considered to be separate titles by Nintendo.) installment in the Super Smash Bros. series, succeeding Super Smash Bros. for Nintendo 3DS and Wii U (2014). The game follows the series' traditional style of gameplay, in which players control one of the various characters and use attacks to weaken their opponents and knock them out of an arena. It features a wide variety of game modes, including a single-player campaign and multiplayer versus modes. Ultimate features 74 playable fighters (89 counting downloadable content), including all characters from previous Super Smash Bros. games as well as newcomers. The roster ranges from Nintendo characters to those from third-party franchises.

Planning for the game had begun by December 2015, with full development starting after the completion of 3DS/Wii U's downloadable content (DLC). Series creator and director Masahiro Sakurai returned along with Bandai Namco Studios and Sora, the studios that developed 3DS/Wii U, with their return speeding up the preparation process. Sakurai's goal with Ultimate was to include every character from previous games in the series, despite the various development and licensing challenges this would present. Several well-known video game musicians contributed to the soundtrack, with Hideki Sakamoto writing the main theme "Lifelight". Ultimate was first teased in a Nintendo Direct in March 2018, with Nintendo's E3 2018 Direct primarily revealing and featuring it that subsequent June. Ultimate received downloadable content adding new fighters, stages, and other content until October 2021.

Super Smash Bros. Ultimate was released on December 7, 2018. The game received acclaim from critics, who lauded its refined gameplay and fine-tuning of the series' best elements as well as its extensive variety of content and characters, while its online mode received criticism for technical issues and matchmaking. Ultimate is often considered to be one of the best titles on the Switch and one of the greatest video games ever made, becoming a popular competitive fighting game in esports like its predecessors. It is also the best-selling fighting game in history and one of the best-selling games on the Switch, having sold over 37 million copies as of December 2025.

== Gameplay ==
Pre-release screenshot of a four-player match on the Great Plateau stage (from The Legend of Zelda: Breath of the Wild) between Ganondorf, Link, Mario and Mega Man

Super Smash Bros. Ultimate is a platform fighter for up to eight players in which characters from Nintendo games and third-party franchises fight to knock each other out of an arena. Each player has a percentage meter that increases as they take damage, representing the amount of knockback they take from attacks; the higher a character's percent, the easier it is to launch them into the air and out of the arena. Standard battles use one of three victory conditions: Timed, where players aim to earn the most KOs within a time limit; Stock, where each player or team has a set number of lives and aims to be the last player standing; and Stamina, in which the percentage meter is replaced with a measure of hit points that opponents try to reduce to zero to win. Players can adjust the rules to their liking and save them as presets for future matches.

Players have the option to enable various items to spawn at random during battle, which can be picked up and used in various ways to grant them an advantage; for instance, Poké Balls and Assist Trophies respectively summon Pokémon and other non-playable characters to assist the user in battle. In Timed matches, certain Assist Trophies can be attacked and defeated to earn points. Each character also possesses a powerful Final Smash attack, which can be performed either by obtaining a Smash Ball or by filling up a special meter, either of which can be toggled on and off. The base game features 103 different stages (plus one additional stage added in a free update), with additional stages being bundled alongside DLC fighters. Most stages have dynamic elements and hazards that can be toggled on or off in the rules, and each stage has an alternative Battlefield and Omega form with standardized layouts. A new feature called Stage Morph allows players to select two stages that the game alternates between at certain intervals during a match. Other tweaks include new icons and gauges for character-specific abilities, such as Cloud's Limit gauge.

In addition to returning modes such as Classic, Special Smash, and Home-Run Contest, Ultimate adds new modes. These are Smashdown, where each character can only be played once; Squad Strike, where players battle in teams of either 3 or 5 characters; and Tourney, a tournament mode that allows up to 32 players to battle in playoff brackets.

=== Spirits ===
A typical Spirit battle. Here, players must fight an Incineroar meant to represent Tom Nook from the Animal Crossing series.

Ultimate introduces the Spirits mechanic, replacing the collectible trophies from previous games. Each of these Spirits, based on characters from represented franchises, can be used to power up a fighter with unique abilities. Players mainly gain Spirits through pre-made challenges called "Spirit Battles" that represent the character the Spirit depicts, which are embodied by one or more of the game's fighters and other specific level effects. For example, the Spirit battle of Rayquaza, a flying dragon Pokémon, requires players to defeat a large version of Ridley with a similar color palette and wind effects. Players are encouraged to strategically choose Spirits based on the level effects; in the same example, a player would need to equip a Spirit that provides wind resistance or immunity, or one that allows them to deal extra damage to a giant opponent. A separate mode called the Spirit Board presents a rotating set of Spirit battles for players to gain Spirits from. Spirits have a growth and evolution system, in which they can be leveled up to become more powerful or converted into Cores to summon new Spirits. Certain Spirits will also become an "enhanced" form upon reaching max level, but will return to level 1. Nintendo offers limited-timed Spirit events in cross-promotion with other games and franchises, with the Spirits featured only available to collect during the event. Eventually, these Spirits make their way into general rotation and can be found on the Spirit Board. The local multiplayer mode also allows for the option to use Spirits.

==== World of Light ====
Ultimate features the return of Adventure Mode, which was previously absent in 3DS/Wii U. It is now integrated into the Spirits mode with a new story, World of Light, which prominently uses the game's Spirit mechanics. The mode's narrative begins with an evil entity, Galeem, destroying the Smash Bros. world, vaporizing almost all of the fighter characters and placing them under his imprisonment; only Kirby, due to his Warp Star, evades this attack. Players explore the titular World of Light, a new world that Galeem created in the original world's place, to rescue captured fighters and Spirits -the remnants of other characters' physical forms- by completing marked Spirit Battles. Players can use regained allies and Spirits to overcome certain challenges on the map and defeat Galeem. However, after Galeem is defeated, a new enemy, Dharkon, emerges; after Dharkon's defeat, it wages war against Galeem. If just Galeem is defeated, Dharkon will engulf the world in darkness, but if just Dharkon is defeated, then Galeem will cover the universe with light. However, by defeating an equal number of light and dark Spirits on the final map, players are able to challenge and defeat both of them, freeing the Spirits from their control.

=== Additional features ===
The game supports local multiplayer, local wireless with other systems, and online play via Wi-Fi or LAN connections. By defeating players online, players earn tags which can be traded for in-game currency to buy new Spirits, music, and Mii Fighter costumes. The game is compatible with Joy-Con controllers, the Nintendo Switch Pro Controller, and GameCube controllers via a USB adapter. Like the previous entry, amiibo figurines can be used to create AI-controlled Figure Players, which can be trained to become stronger. Shortly after the game's release, a service for the Nintendo Switch Online mobile app, known as "Smash World", was launched, which allows players to check their game statistics and share images and videos captured from the game to social media. Ultimate features over 900 music tracks, which can be played through the Switch's handheld mode while in standby mode. Version 3.0 of the game, released in April 2019, adds a Stage Builder, which allows players to create custom stages which can be shared or downloaded through the Switch Online service. The update also includes a replay editor, allowing players to edit stored replays, which can be shared online or downloaded to other devices. These replays are available within the Smash World app. An update in May 2019 provided limited support for the virtual reality VR Kit of Nintendo Labo, allowing players to view computer-only matches in VR or play in a 1-on-1 mode against the computer. An update in September 2019 added the Home-Run Contest mode from previous Smash games.

=== Playable characters ===
Super Smash Bros. Ultimate, like other games in the Super Smash Bros. series, features a crossover cast of fighters from several different Nintendo franchises, as well as fighters from series owned by third-party developers. The base game features 74 playable fighters, (Note: Pokémon Trainer, who uses three summonable Pokémon, is regarded as a single character; the total number of fighters goes to 76 if one counts each of their Pokémon individually.) consisting of all 63 previous fighters from past entries and 11 newcomers: the Inklings from the Splatoon series; Princess Daisy from the Mario series; Ridley and Dark Samus from the Metroid series; Simon and Richter Belmont from the Castlevania series; Chrom from Fire Emblem Awakening; King K. Rool from the Donkey Kong series; Isabelle from the Animal Crossing series; Ken Masters from the Street Fighter series; and Incineroar from Pokémon Sun and Moon. When starting the game, players only have access to the eight starter characters of the original Super Smash Bros. and unlock the rest by completing the game's Classic mode, playing through World of Light, or fighting a certain number of battles.

Certain characters whose movesets are directly based on other characters are now classified as "Echo Fighters", possessing similar movesets and proportions to the fighters they are based on, but with unique animations and gameplay differences. On the character selection screen, these characters can either be listed individually or stacked with the fighters they are based on. Select characters also have alternative skins featuring different genders or sometimes other characters, such as Bowser Jr., who has the other Koopalings as skins, but with identical animations and abilities. Several returning characters received updates to their appearances, such as Mario having Cappy from Super Mario Odyssey accompanying him and The Legend of Zelda: Breath of the Wild's incarnation of Link replacing the one from Twilight Princess.

Additional fighters have been added to the game via post-release downloadable content (DLC). The first of these, Piranha Plant from the Mario series, was released in January 2019 and made available for free to those who purchased and registered the game with a My Nintendo account before the end of that month. Additional fighters, each coming with a unique stage and related music, have been released both individually and as part of two Fighters Pass bundles. The first Fighters Pass consisted of five characters: Joker from Persona 5, released in April 2019; the Hero (Note: Despite the name referring to a single character, the Hero represents four different protagonists from the Dragon Quest series. His default appearance is the Luminary/Eleven from Dragon Quest XI, with Erdrick/Arusu from Dragon Quest III, Solo from Dragon Quest IV, and Eight from Dragon Quest VIII appearing as alternate costumes.) from the Dragon Quest series, released in July 2019; Banjo & Kazooie from the Banjo-Kazooie series, released in September 2019; Terry Bogard from the Fatal Fury series, released in November 2019; and Byleth from Fire Emblem: Three Houses, released in January 2020.

The second Fighters Pass, titled Fighters Pass Volume 2, consisted of six additional fighters and was the final content planned for Ultimate. The first character in this collection, Min Min from ARMS, was released in June 2020. Steve, (Note: Alex, Zombie, and Enderman are included as alternate skins.) the default player avatar from Minecraft, was released in October 2020. Sephiroth, the main antagonist of Final Fantasy VII, was released in December 2020, with players able to unlock him a few days early by defeating him in a limited-time boss battle known as the "Sephiroth Challenge". Pyra and Mythra, a dual character from Xenoblade Chronicles 2, were released in March 2021. Kazuya Mishima from the Tekken series was released in June 2021. Sora from the Kingdom Hearts series was the final fighter to be added in October 2021.

== Development ==
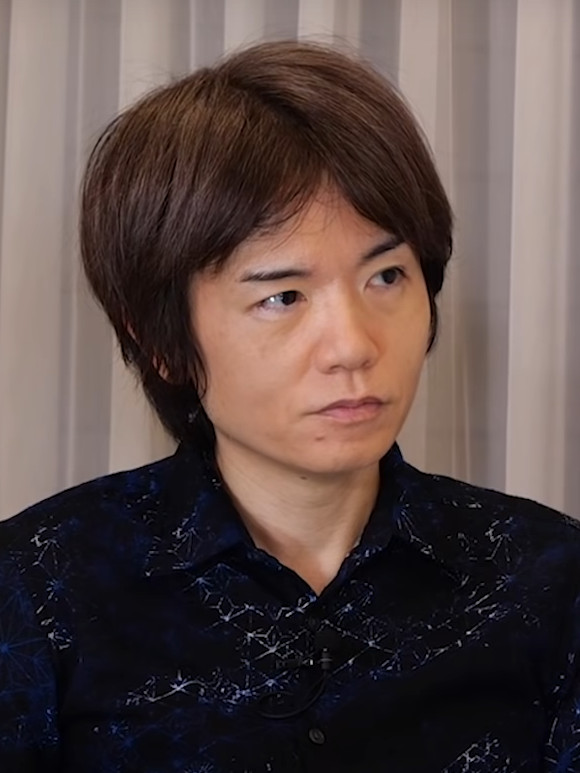
Super Smash Bros. series creator and director Masahiro Sakurai in 2021

Super Smash Bros. Ultimate was developed by Bandai Namco Studios and Sora Ltd., the same studios that developed Super Smash Bros. for Nintendo 3DS and Wii U, for the Nintendo Switch, with series creator Masahiro Sakurai returning as game director. Unlike previous Super Smash Bros. games, the team was not assembled from the ground up, which sped up preparation time. The project plan for the game was in the works by December 2015, when the DLC for 3DS and Wii U was in development, and finished after it was completed. Staff gathering was done soon afterward. The development period was shorter compared to previous entries in the series. Hatena assisted with the development of some elements, and tri-Crescendo contributed to programming and design.

According to Sakurai, producing a Super Smash Bros. game for the Switch was the last request that former Nintendo president Satoru Iwata had given him before his death in 2015, and he wanted to make the game the best possible product he could to respect him. Sakurai sought to include every character from previous games, as to not disappoint fans. However, he knew this would be a complex problem for both development and licensing; it would also drastically increase the cost of development. The return of Bandai and Sora made it easier for this to happen. Sakurai also wanted to adjust character abilities to speed up the game, although not to an extent that would alienate players unfamiliar with the series. Sakurai knew that Ultimate was a core game for Nintendo and that it had a dedicated player base that he did not want to disappoint, and believed that completing this goal was necessary to satisfy them. Sakurai was also faced with the decision to either create a completely new game system or build off of pre-existing ones; he chose to build off pre-existing ones because there would only be about a third of the characters he desired in the final game. All the returning characters' abilities had to be re-balanced so they could work in Ultimate. Originally, gameplay would differ between the Switch's docked and handheld modes, but Sakurai scrapped this idea since the system's screen in handheld mode was better than he thought. Sakurai believed this would be the only Smash game to have the full roster of returning characters, calling the effort to include the characters, music, stage settings, and other elements as "unprecedented", and cautioned that future games in the series would likely be smaller in scope. However, he still wanted to add as many fighters as possible through DLC.

Voice lines recorded by David Hayter for Snake were re-used for Ultimate. Xander Mobus, who voiced Crazy Hand, Master Hand, and the announcer in Super Smash Bros. for Nintendo 3DS and Wii U, also made a return with new voice clips, in addition to reprising his role as Joker from Persona 5 when he was added as DLC. The addition of Ridley from Metroid as a playable character had been highly requested within the Super Smash Bros. community for some time. In 2008, Sakurai stated that he knew Ridley was a high-demand character, but thought that he was "impossible" to add unless they were able to sacrifice the character's size for balancing purposes. So that Ridley could be included in the game, Sakurai studied the art of the character and redesigned him so he could stand upright. All characters were chosen at the beginning of development except for Incineroar, who had not been created yet; the team instead left a space open for a Sun and Moon Pokémon. The Inklings' ink mechanic proved challenging to implement due to its interactions with environments.

The team built Ultimate from scratch with new assets and content. Localization manager Nate Bihldorff stated that the game significantly upgraded lighting effects and texture rendering from the game engine of the Wii U version. The World of Light mode was inspired by Brawl's (2008) Subspace Emissary, and Sakurai chose to start it with a cataclysmic event because he thought it would leave a greater impact on players. The team conceived the Spirits mechanic because they wanted to create an enjoyable single-player mode, but did not have enough resources to create character models. While it did not let them tell stories for individual fighters or create new locations and rules, it let them use various characters and assets. One part of the team chose Spirits to include in the game and had to thoroughly research them; according to Sakurai, the Spirits mode was essential for using various franchises.

=== Music ===
Like previous games in the series, Ultimate features several well-known video game music composers and arrangers providing a mix of original music and rearrangements of various tracks for the represented franchises, with over 1,000 tracks in total. New to Ultimate is the tying of tracks to franchises instead of individual stages, as well as the ability to create custom playlists to listen to outside the game when the Switch is in handheld mode. Sakurai stated that he began contacting composers over a year before release, providing them with a database of over a thousand suggested track ideas. In addition, he allowed them to submit their own personal favorites, with those choices being given priority for inclusion. While Sakurai oversaw the process and preferred that the music retain the spirit of the original games, the direction of them was generally handled by the composers themselves. The main theme, "Lifelight", composed by Hideki Sakamoto, is the basis of most of the game's original music.

=== Downloadable content ===
As with previous entries, Nintendo planned to offer new fighters through DLC; however, unlike with the 3DS and Wii U, where players could request which characters they wished to see in the game, Nintendo chose which characters they would add by November 2018. Like the previous title, additional Mii costumes were released as paid DLC, with certain costumes also adding new music tracks to the game. Sakurai believed that despite characters like Joker, the first announced DLC fighter, not being from games usually associated with Nintendo, they were added because they were "emblematic" of the types of characters they wanted to add to Ultimate. He also stated that they "bring just a whole different level of fun and enjoyment for players". The Piranha Plant was chosen as a DLC character because Sakurai wanted to add diversity to the roster. Nintendo met with Rare studio head Craig Duncan at E3 2018 to discuss the possibility of including Banjo and Kazooie as downloadable content; Duncan, believing it to be "a great opportunity", agreed and connected the two development teams for further discussions. Sakurai noted that Banjo and Kazooie were the second most requested character for Super Smash Bros. for Nintendo 3DS and Wii U in a Nintendo-sanctioned fan vote in 2015, and that their addition happened "quite easily", despite the property being owned by Microsoft through its acquisition of Rare. Phil Spencer, the head of Xbox, stated that negotiating their inclusion was "an easy deal to make" thanks to Microsoft's strong partnership with Nintendo.

The development of Fighters Pass Volume 2 was heavily affected by the COVID-19 pandemic in 2020, as due to stay-at-home orders in Japan, Sakurai and his development team had to work remotely. According to Daniel Kaplan of Mojang Studios, early discussions between Nintendo and Microsoft about including Minecraft content in the Super Smash Bros. series had begun roughly five years prior to Steve's addition into the game. The character's inclusion required the development team to rework every stage in the game to accommodate Steve's gameplay mechanics. Sakurai had wanted to include Sora from Kingdom Hearts in the game because he was the top fighter requested for Nintendo 3DS and Wii U in the 2015 fan vote. However, they initially thought that the legality surrounding the intellectual property with Disney would be insurmountable, and originally planned for only five fighters in the second pass. However, Sakurai met a Disney representative at an award venue, which facilitated the start of negotiations for Sora's inclusion. Nintendo, Disney, and Square Enix saw towards including Sora in the game and overseeing all aspects related to his inclusion, with several limitations and guidelines they were required to follow. The Sora Challenger Pack featured a promotional tie-in with the 2020 rhythm game Kingdom Hearts: Melody of Memory: players with Melody of Memory save data on their Nintendo Switch would unlock the music track "Dearly Beloved (Swing Version)".

== Release ==
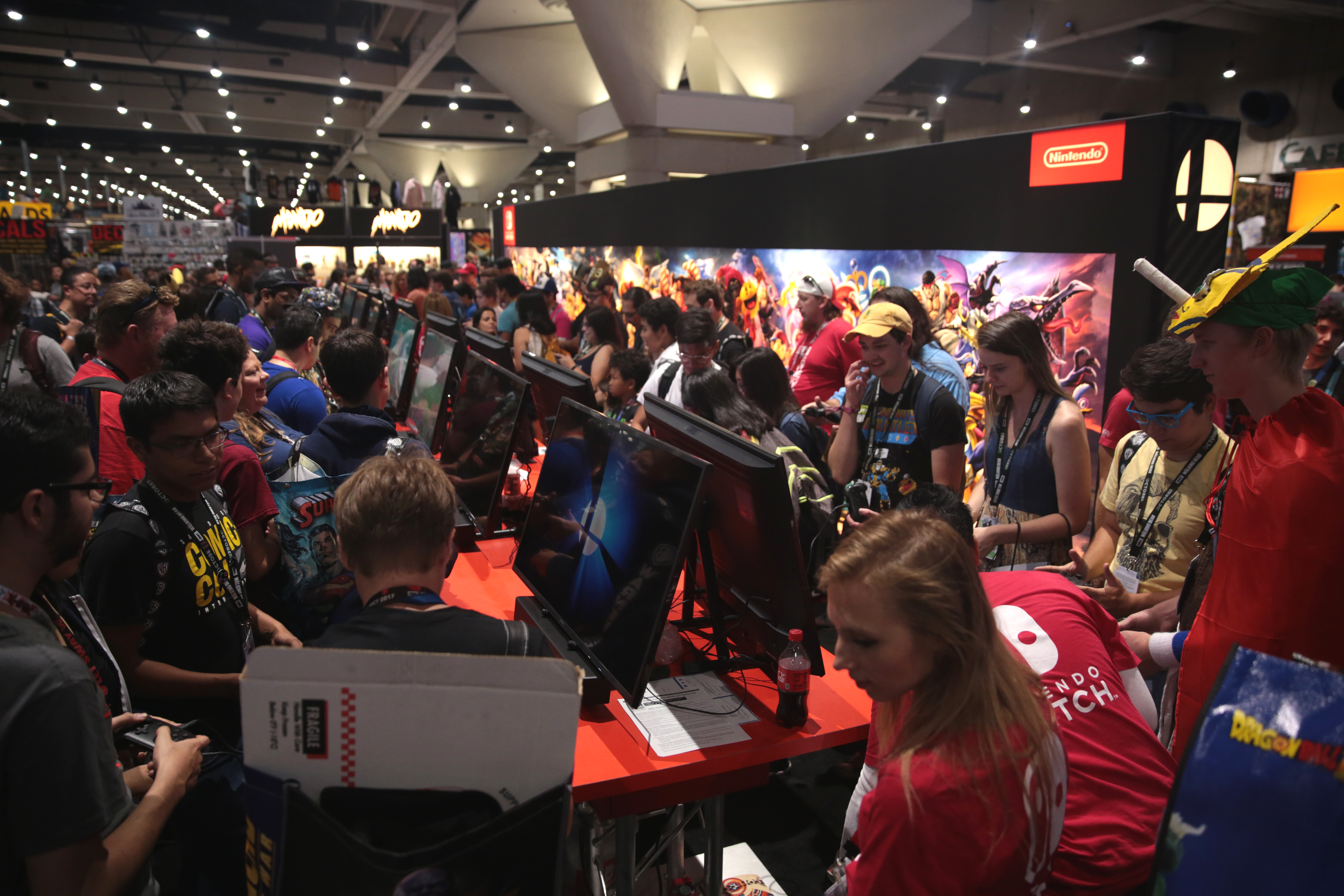
Attendees at the 2018 San Diego Comic-Con playing a demo of Ultimate

On March 8, 2018, Nintendo announced that the next Super Smash Bros. game would release on the Nintendo Switch sometime in 2018. The teaser, broadcast in an online Nintendo Direct presentation, did not reveal the title of the game. However, it showed several characters, including Mario, Link, and the Inklings from Splatoon, the last of which would be new to the Super Smash Bros. series. At E3 2018 that June, Nintendo revealed the game's title as Super Smash Bros. Ultimate, and announced that it would be released on December 7, 2018. The E3 presentation detailed several changes to the gameplay of Ultimate compared to previous titles, and highlighted that every playable character from past installments of the series would return in Ultimate, in addition to new characters like the Inklings and Ridley from the Metroid series, who was announced at the end of the presentation. Afterwards, Nintendo hosted an invitational tournament for the game featuring competitive players of Super Smash Bros. for Wii U and Melee.

Demo versions were playable at E3 and at San Diego Comic-Con the following month. IGN nominated Ultimate for its Best Game of E3 2018 award; the game won Best Nintendo Switch Game from both IGN and Gamescom. Two Nintendo Direct presentations in 2018, one on August 8 and another one on November 1, were devoted to the game, revealing new characters, stages, and game modes.

Nintendo released Super Smash Bros. Ultimate worldwide on December 7, 2018. In addition to the standard retail version, a special edition containing a Super Smash Bros.-themed Nintendo Switch Pro Controller and a Switch with a download code was also released. An additional special edition contained a pair of Super Smash Bros.-themed Joy-Con as well as a Switch console, a Super Smash Bros.-themed dock, and a download code for the game. A GameCube controller with the Super Smash Bros. Ultimate logo was released on November 2, 2018.

One of the game's new additions had the character Mr. Game & Watch assuming the appearance of a feather- and loincloth-wearing Native American when using one of his attacks—a reference to Fire Attack (1982), in which players controlled a cowboy defending his fort from attacking indigenous people. Some users on social media saw this as racist, leading to Nintendo of America apologizing and removing the animation in an update shortly after release. Two weeks before its release, a leaked copy of the game was distributed across the internet. Nintendo took steps to issue copyright strikes on YouTube videos using data mined content, while fans worked to isolate spoilers, particularly the World of Light story mode, from those that had played the leaked version.

== Reception ==
Reception

Aggregate scores
Aggregator	Score
Metacritic	93/100
OpenCritic	97% recommend

Review scores
Publication	Score
Destructoid	9.5/10
Edge	9/10
Electronic Gaming Monthly	9.5/10
Eurogamer	Essential
Famitsu	38/40
Game Informer	9.5/10
GamePro	87/100
GameSpot	9/10
GamesRadar+	4.5/5
IGN	9.4/10
Jeuxvideo.com	18/20
Nintendo Life	10/10
Nintendo World Report	9/10
USgamer	4.5/5

Ultimate received "universal acclaim" from critics, according to the review aggregator platform Metacritic. Fellow review aggregator OpenCritic assessed that the game received "mighty" approval, being recommended by 97% of critics. Critics lauded the huge cast of characters and levels, new game modes, and combining of the best elements from its predecessors. French video game website Jeuxvideo.com called it the best game in the series, praising its features which "brilliantly mix gargantuan content with nostalgia". Bleacher Report hailed the game's colorful art style, faster gameplay, and unique stages. IGN praised the game's decision to bring back every character from the series as "ambitious and excellent". The game's massive soundtrack and portable music player were praised by The Verge.

However, the game's online mode received criticism for its technical performance and matchmaking. Many players found significant lag affecting their games, even when using wired connections over wireless, while the game's matchmaking features did not adhere to players' criteria, with players frequently playing matches with rule sets they did not choose. The matchmaking process was further criticized for making it difficult for friends to join matches over random players, and not allowing multiple local players to join in online matches. There had been so many complaints on Ultimate's subreddit that the administrators forwarded all complaints to a separate thread. The lag and loading time issues are lessened on the Nintendo Switch 2, which is backwards compatible with Switch games such as Ultimate. The World of Light mode also received mixed reviews. While some found the single-player mode both accessible and challenging, others found the mode tedious and excessive.

=== Sales ===
In November 2018, Nintendo announced Ultimate was the most pre-ordered game for the Switch and in the series. The Association for UK Interactive Entertainment reported that Ultimate was the fastest-selling Switch and Super Smash Bros. game in the United Kingdom, with physical launch sales 302% higher than those for Super Smash Bros. for Wii U, 233% higher than those for 3DS, and 62.5% higher than those for Brawl. In its first three days on sale in Japan, the game sold 1.2 million copies, outselling Pokémon: Let's Go, Pikachu! and Let's Go, Eevee! and The Legend of Zelda: Breath of the Wild in the region.

Within 11 days of its release, Ultimate had sold more than three million copies within the United States, making it the fastest-selling Switch game in the country. It was similarly the fastest-selling Switch game as well as the fastest-selling game for any Nintendo console in Europe based on the first 11-day sales. It was estimated that the game sold and shipped over five million copies within its first three days of release. Within three weeks, Ultimate became the fifth best-selling Switch game in the United Kingdom, surpassing the sales of Splatoon 2. In January 2019, Amazon reported that Ultimate was their highest selling video game product of 2018, with Nintendo officially announcing that the game had shipped over 12.08 million copies worldwide. Ultimate was also Nintendo's fastest-selling game of all time until being surpassed by Pokémon Sword and Shield in 2019. By September 2020, the game had sold over 21.10 million copies worldwide, making it the best-selling fighting game of all time, surpassing the record of Street Fighter II, and became the third-best-selling Nintendo Switch game, only behind Animal Crossing: New Horizons and Mario Kart 8 Deluxe. As of March 31, 2025, total sales reached 36.24 million.

=== Awards ===
The game won the award for "Best Nintendo Switch Game", "Best Fighting Game", and "Best Multiplayer Game" in IGN's Best of 2018 Awards, whereas its other nominations were for "Game of the Year" and "Best Video Game Music".

List of Super Smash Bros. Ultimate awards
Year	Award	Category	Result	Ref.
2018	Game Critics Awards	Best of Show	Nominated	
2018	Game Critics Awards	Best Console Game	Nominated	
2018	Game Critics Awards	Best Fighting Game	Won	
2018	2018 Golden Joystick Awards	Most Wanted Game	Nominated	
2019	22nd Annual D.I.C.E. Awards	Fighting Game of the Year	Won	
2019	SXSW Gaming Awards	Video Game of the Year	Nominated	
2019	SXSW Gaming Awards	Excellence in Art	Nominated	
2019	SXSW Gaming Awards	Excellence in Gameplay	Won	
2019	SXSW Gaming Awards	Excellence in Multiplayer	Nominated	
2019	2019 Kids' Choice Awards	Favorite Video Game	Nominated	
2019	15th British Academy Games Awards	Multiplayer	Nominated	
2019	Japan Game Awards	Grand Prize	Won	
2019	Japan Game Awards	Best Sales Award	Won	
2019	Japan Game Awards	Global Award, Japanese Product	Won	
2019	Japan Game Awards	Excellence Award	Won	
2019	Japan Game Awards	Ministry of Economy, Trade and Industry Award	Won	
2019	2019 Golden Joystick Awards	Best Multiplayer Game	Nominated	
2019	2019 Golden Joystick Awards	eSports Game of the Year	Nominated	
2019	2019 Golden Joystick Awards	Nintendo Game of the Year	Won	
2019	The Game Awards 2019	Game of the Year	Nominated	
2019	The Game Awards 2019	Best Fighting Game	Won	
2019	The Game Awards 2019	Best Family Game	Nominated	
2020	2020 Kids' Choice Awards	Favorite Video Game	Nominated	

== Esports ==
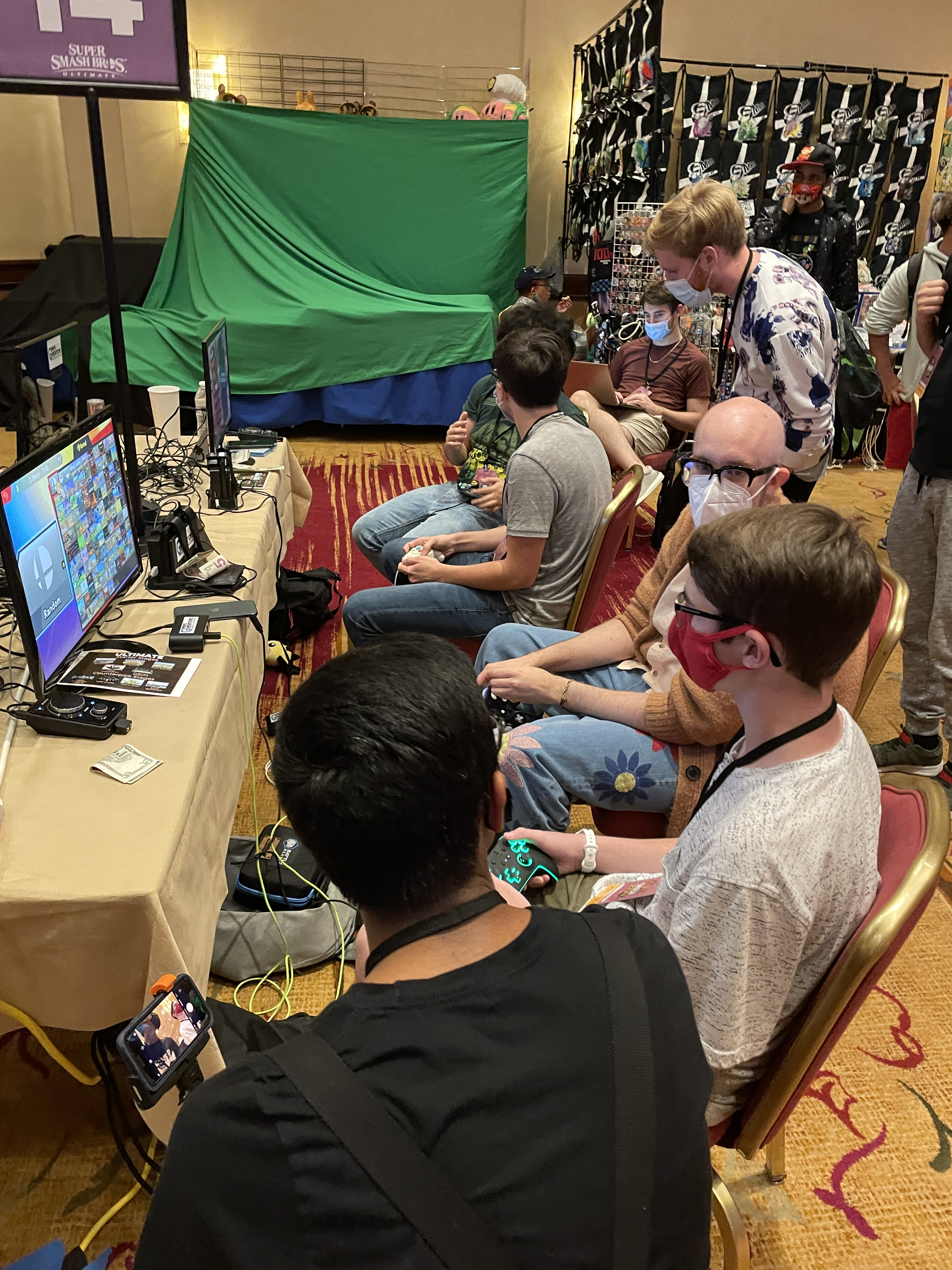
A group of people playing Ultimate at Super Smash Con 2021 in Herndon, Virginia.

EVO 2019, held on August 2–4, 2019, featured Ultimate as one of its main events. It was the largest offline Smash Bros. tournament of all time, with 3,534 entrants signed up. It set a new record for EVO concurrent viewership, with over 279,000 viewers during Top 8. On May 8–10, 2020, top Super Smash Bros. Melee player Hungrybox partnered with NFL running back Le'Veon Bell and esports organization Team Liquid to host The Box, an online tournament with a $10,000 prize pool.

In February 2020, it was announced that the Smash World Tour would feature both Super Smash Bros. Melee and Ultimate players for a grand prize pool of $250,000. The tournament would have included international qualifiers, with the grand finals' location to be in the United States. However, the COVID-19 pandemic quickly led to several of the qualifiers getting either postponed or canceled. The Smash World Tour was successfully relaunched in 2021, featuring a mix of online and offline qualifiers and culminating in a final offline championship. In 2022, an officially licensed circuit was introduced, being the Panda Cup, featuring Super Smash Bros. Melee and Super Smash Bros. Ultimate. However, on November 24, 2022, Nintendo stated that the Smash World Tour 2022 could not continue, as they did not have a license from Nintendo. Accusations of Panda CEO, Alan Bunney, caused many players who had qualified for the Panda Cup to drop out. This caused both the Panda Cup and the Smash World Tour 2022 Championships to be cancelled, along with the Smash World Tour 2023.
