= Sofia (Battle Arena Toshinden) =

Fictional video game character

- Battle Arena Toshinden character
- Sofia in Battle Arena Toshinden, as drawn by Kotobuki.
- First game: Battle Arena Toshinden (1995)
- Created by: Shintarō Nakaoka
- Designed by: Miho Furukawa; Tsukasa Kotobuki
- Voiced by: English: Debbie Rabbai (OVA); Japanese: Yoko Teppouzuka; Yumi Tōma (OVA, URA–present)
- Portrayed by: Jazuli (Toshinden 2)

In-universe information
- Weapon: Whip
- Origin: Russia

Sofia (Japanese: ソフィア) is a character introduced in the 1995 Tamsoft produced fighting game Battle Arena Toshinden and included in its subsequent sequels and spinoffs. Created by Shintarō Nakaoka and designed by Miho Furukawa and Tsukasa Kotobuki, she is a blonde Russian woman and former KGB member who works as a private detective in Tokyo. Dressed in the manner of a dominatrix and fighting with a whip, she enters the series' fighting game tournament to find out more of her past and clues to the Secret Society behind them. She was originally voiced by Yoko Teppouzuka in Japanese, with Yumi Tōma later taking over the role, while Debbie Rabbai voiced her in English for the series' anime adaptation, and model Jazuli portrayed her in live action media.

Sofia has been cited by Japanese media as one of the influential faces in the early days of 3D video games, serving as a popular subject of cosplay. For a brief period, she also served as Sony's mascot for their PlayStation hardware. Described as both aggressive and elegant, her character was praised for both her sex appeal and personality, and used as an example of video gaming aiming for a more mature audience. However, she has also been criticized as a highly sexualized marketing tool meant to pander to a young male demographic, seen by some as a negative reflection on the series as a whole.

== Conception and development ==
While Tamsoft was initially developing their 1995 3D fighting game Battle Arena Toshinden, when first developing the cast director Shintarō Nakaoka started with a basic concept taking inspiration from the duality of Ryu and Ken Masters of Capcom's Street Fighter series. Working with character designer Miho Furukawa, he then followed with developing certain character archetypes to provide a variety of physiques to the game, such as the "big man", the "guru", and the "lolita". As development progressed others added their own elements, such as programmers adding unique animations to characters to give them more visible personality, while one core person was assigned to each character to assist with the planning stage.

The character designs were finalized and drawn by Tsukasa Kotobuki, who also provided input on the development process. The game's publisher Takara initially sought to have Masami Obari for this role, but he was unable to due to obligations on another project and suggested Kotobuki instead. According to Battle Arena Toshinden URA director Norihiro Hayasaka, in the original game there was a noticeable discrepancy between Kotobuki's artwork and the character models themselves, particularly in how he drew the female characters as slender with large breasts. Hayasaka pushed for the models to be closer to Kotobuki's art in terms of silhouette as a result, but also keep sharp edges to retain a style unique for Toshinden.

=== Design ===
Sofia went through multiple designs for Toshinden 2, one being an inverse of her original outfit's exposure (left). The dress (right) proved popular with cosplayers.

Sofia stands 172.5 centimetres (5 ft 8 in) tall and has measurements of 90-56-88 cm (35-22-35 in). In the first game, she is dressed like a dominatrix, described as a "queen" in-game. She wears a leotard that exposes her cleavage, torn leggings that connect to high heel boots, and similar fingerless gloves that extend to her elbows. Large earrings are worn on each ear, which were intended to bring a sense of charm to her character. Her long blonde hair is in a ponytail held in place with a red hairband, and arching bangs frame her face in the front. Sofia's physical appearance was decided early on, though the earliest versions of her character design lacked bangs. During the development process, Tamsoft proposed giving her a six-sectioned staff instead of a whip due to how the weapon had to be rendered in game as well as armor on the undersides of her breasts, but both ideas were rejected.

In each major title in the series, Sofia's outfit saw a significant change. Starting with Battle Arena Toshinden 2, her attire was changed to a collared dress with a cleavage window in the front, and transparent material on the upper chest. Early drafts shown during Toshinden 2's announcement showed it with a transparent vinyl skirt, but for the final version it was changed to a side-slit dress with narrow material in the front and back. In Battle Arena Toshinden URA, it was changed back to a leotard, but with large shoulders that end in a metal hoop around the bicep, and pink sleeves extending to the middle finger. The development team behind URA was mindful of the growing cosplay community in Japan that had taken a liking to Toshinden, and as a result wanted to create a design that would be more difficult for them to replicate.

For Battle Arena Toshinden 3, her outfit was redesigned again, consisting now of brown stockings, circular red earrings, and a black leotard with matching heels. The leotard ends just below her breasts, with a Russian-themed obi sash now criss-crossing over them as well as over her arms, full left leg and right lower leg. While the development team expressed it emphasized her chest, they felt she lost some of her "queenly" aspect in exchange.

== Appearances ==
Sofia is a Russian fighter introduced in Battle Arena Toshinden. A former member of the KGB, she is skilled in magic and works as a private detective in Tokyo. She enters the fighting tournaments to follow clues regarding the Secret Society puppeteering the series' events, and learn more about her past. She later discovers her memories are fabrications, manufactured by the Secret Society who experimented on her as a child until one of their members, her mother, intervened. She re-enters the tournament to discover the truth about her past. In Toshinden 3, she is asked by fellow character Ellis to locate the girl's father, Gaia, and in the process discovers the tournament's new organizers are creating cyborg assassins modeled after her. She appears in spinoff games related to the series, such as Battle Arena Nitoshinden, Puzzle Arena Toshinden, Toshinden Card Quest, and the Game Boy version of Battle Arena Toshinden developed by Betop.

In terms of gameplay, she fights primarily with her whip. It is utilized in special moves such as Rattlesnake, which whips the opponent multiple times, or Call Me Queen, a move only usable at low health that causes her to spin with her whip around her, doing more damage the closer the opponent is to her. Meanwhile, attacks such as Aurora Revolution or Lover Shower rely on her kicks to connect, while Thunder Ring generates a circular and long traveling projectile and can be utilized mid-air to juggle the opponent.

Outside of the games, Sofia also appears in the two audio-only CD dramas that act as continuations of the game's story, and the sequel OVA series. An additional, more comedic chapter titled 主役は誰なんだ編 (lit. "Who is the Lead Role?") was also released on cassette tape. In print media, anthology comic collections by various authors featuring the character were compiled in two separate books, one for the first and the other for the second game.

She was originally voiced by Yoko Teppouzuka in Japanese for the first two games as well as Nitoshinden, while Yumi Tōma voiced her in the OVA and later games starting with the release of Toshinden URA. Hayasaka praised Tōma's performance, stating it was "so sexy he was a little embarrassed. In English, her voice actress for the first Toshinden and its remake Toshinden Remix is uncredited, while Debbie Rabbai voiced her in the OVA. Model Jazuli portrayed her in the live action opening sequence for Toshinden 2, as well as commercials for the game.

== Promotion and merchandise ==
Sofia's use as a PlayStation mascot has been significantly discussed, particularly regarding the "Sofia Says" ad campaign.

During the debut of the PlayStation, early advertisements were run for Toshinden that focused on Sofia's inclusion in the game, using the then-intended North American mascot for the console, Polygon Man. However, after Sony's Japanese branch reacted negatively to the Polygon Man character, the campaign briefly shifted to Sofia exclusively, who was used to market the PlayStation directly in a "Sofia Says" ad campaign where she would bark orders at the reader in the manner of a dominatrix. Later, a similar campaign was run by Sega on their website when Toshinden was released for the Sega Saturn, putting "Because Toshlnden's Sofia says so" at the top of a list of reasons to purchase the gaming console. She was also featured in television ads for Battle Arena Toshinden, with the tagline "Like to be humiliated by women? Here’s your dream date. Worship me."

In Japan, models representing Sofia and Ellis were featured at promotional events for the game's release. Takara Amusement also produced two varieties of character-themed clocks. Takara also released a doll of the character in 1997, based on her appearance in Battle Arena Toshinden 2.

=== Response to advertising ===
The ad campaigns featuring Sofia for the PlayStation drew a variety of discussion. The staff of GameFan remarked that female readers of its magazines wrote in to complain about the ad, stating that they themselves felt that it was a bizarre ad that insulted both "mature gamers" and female gamers. Scott Taves of Wired meanwhile noted that while she was an early contender for a mascot for the PlayStation brand, she was quickly replaced with Crash Bandicoot, something he attributed possibly due to "S/M attire". Official U.S. PlayStation Magazine in a retrospective felt that the ad campaigns along with its design helped paint the PlayStation as a console for more mature audiences instead of a toy for children, helping to make gaming as a whole appear "cool", though pointed out the low resolution of her character model "kept the smut-meter down".

The "Sofia Says" advertisement in particular was analyzed in the book The Ethics of Playing, Researching, and Teaching Games in the Writing Classroom by Professors Victoria L. Braegger and Ryan M. Moeller. They cited it as an example of how video game advertising tended to focus on the "hardcore gamer", using in this case the imagery of a dominatrix and binding the player to the rules of the game Simon Says. This not only put an imperative in the reader's mind, while prodding the reader's masculinity by encouraging them to be "man enough" to hurt for the character, in this case financially.

== Critical reception ==
Sofia was mostly well received upon her debut. The staff of Computer Games Strategy Plus described her as "a tall leggy blonde with porn-star good looks and a disarming giggle", and felt she was an example of sex sells for the franchise, her presence in it helping to ensure games would be financially successful. The staff of German magazine Video Games cited her alongside Mai Shiranui as examples of how female characters in fighting games illustrated an increase in mature content in video games, something they wanted to see more of. Another German magazine, Bravo Screenfun, cited her as an example of the rise of strong and sexy female characters in video games that countered the notion of women being "the weaker sex".

Other outlets offered their own praise. The staff of Video Games: The Ultimate Gaming Magazine cited her as the character they tended to gravitate to the most when playing the game and an integral part of the PlayStation's appeal. Additional praise went to her outfit and characterization, with the staff further describing her as "the hottest videogame character to come around since Street Fighter II's Chun-Li". Ultra Game Players featured her in their video game character swimsuit issue, calling her one of the most memorable characters on the PlayStation during its early years. Complex writer Larry Hester remarked that she stood out as a Russian character in an industry he felt focused exceedingly on "vodka swilling war criminals with fur hats," feeling that she made a significant impact on the fighting game genre.

She was also popular in Japan, with magazines Game Yuu II and Game Charge citing her popularity in the cosplay community. Magazine Jugemu found she was popular with men in Tokyo's Shibuya district, particularly due to her revealing attire and sexualized behavior but also her strong-willed character. The staff of Chinese magazine Diànzǐ Yóuxì Ruǎnjiàn in their supplemental 1997 issue described her as a very tragic character due to her backstory of trying to recover her memories only to be abandoned. Additional praise was given to her stubborn characterization, which they felt gave her a indominable and unyielding personality. Additional praise was given to her appearance in contrast to her character, stating that while she looked like a dominatrix, she actually fit a "caring older sister" archetype more.

Meanwhile,Virtual Idol magazine ran a six-page article on her and fellow character Ellis, examining both of them and feeling that their appeal arose from both how the Toshinden franchise had expanded their characters through supplemental media, but also how their 3D models made them viewable from every angle. They heavily praised the sex appeal of her design too, particularly the contrast between her large bust and slender figure, particular how the former made her feel visually overwhelming. While describing her as brutal, they shared Diànzǐ Yóuxì Ruǎnjiàn's sisterly assessment of her character, adding that while in-game she was portrayed as a bit of a "queen" archetype, her attacks also gave her a sense of elegance.

Masaru Goto of Heroine Games magazine observed the development of what he called polygon idols, or "polydols", in 3D gaming, and examined Battle Arena Toshinden's female characters in this scope. While he felt early attempts at the concept were lacking, he saw Ellis and Sofia as the first real iterations of the concept and praised Takara's approach. While he expressed that Sofia did not reach the same cultural heights as Ellis, he saw her Toshinden 2 appearance as very popular with cosplayers, and felt her increasingly risque outfits made her the focus of attention between the two. In contrast, Electronic Gaming Monthly used her as an example of how female characters in video games were often sexualized for the sake of marketing, and how such painted an image of the video game industry as male-dominated.

In an article for Game On! USA discussing the similarities between Sofia and fellow blonde female fighting game characters Sarah Bryant of Virtua Fighter and Nina Williams of Tekken, Roger Miller described her as the "prima donna of her game". Regarding her character design, he noted that while some had criticized her for having broad shoulders, he felt it was a welcome change to see more muscular women and femme fatale characters in gaming. He further observed that while her outfit had been criticized by some, it did not feel out of line when compared to how female characters in similar games dressed, referencing Chun-Li's attire directly by stating "At least Sofia doesn't have pom-poms on her head!" Website Kakuchopurei made a similar comparison, describing her as an answer to Sarah Bryant "but Russian" to compete directly with Virtua Fighter. They furthermore saw her as bringing diversity to the game, and the aspect that made Toshinden as a series truly memorable.

Later commentary was more negative, with Honest Gamers writer Joseph Shaffer in a retrospective of the series stating he felt that she was the only standout character of Toshinden's cast, which he felt spoke poorly of the quality of them as a whole when a "sexual selling point" was the standout. Todd Ciolek in an article for Topless Robot considered her a stereotype that presented Russian women as "either babushka-wearing hags or icy blondes armed with predatory sex drives and cackling disdain", and in an article for Anime News Network emphasized that the Toshinden series was better off distancing itself from its old cast, particularly Sofia. Mark B. of Diehard GameFan stated that Sofia was one of the few memorable aspects from the series, due to an overtly sexualized design that was "pandering to young boys everywhere". He felt, however, that the character's relevance had faded, as in 2010 he had "seen more huge chested females in fighting games in the past ten years than a chiropractor in California".
