= Master Hand =

Super Smash Bros. antagonist

- Super Smash Bros. and Kirby character
- Master Hand in Super Smash Bros. Ultimate
- First game: Super Smash Bros. (1999)
- Created by: Masahiro Sakurai
- Voiced by: Various: Jeff Manning (Super Smash Bros.); Dean Harrington (Super Smash Bros. Melee); Pat Cashman (Super Smash Bros. Brawl); Xander Mobus (Super Smash Bros. for Nintendo 3DS and Wii U & Super Smash Bros. Ultimate)

Master Hand is a Nintendo character created by Masahiro Sakurai. He is a floating right-hand glove that appears as a boss in every Super Smash Bros. game's single-player game mode, beginning with the original Super Smash Bros. (1999). He is responsible for setting up the fights between the various characters. His left-hand counterpart, Crazy Hand, was introduced in Super Smash Bros. Melee (2001). He has been voiced by Xander Mobus since Super Smash Bros. for Nintendo 3DS and Wii U (2014).

Master Hand is primarily a non-playable character, only playable in certain ways, such as a glitch in Melee and officially in Super Smash Bros. Ultimate (2018). He has been generally well received, considered a favorite boss fight by multiple critics. Master Hand has been the subject of analysis as to what he represents, with theories positing him as the player or developers, among others.

== Concept and design ==
Created for the Super Smash Bros. series, Master Hand is a floating gloved right hand capable of doing multiple types of attacks, including shooting bullets from his finger, creating lasers, and other attack types. He was created by Masahiro Sakurai and first appeared in Super Smash Bros. (1999) for the Nintendo 64. He is typically fought on the stage Final Destination, a flat plane set in space and featured in every Super Smash Bros. game.

Sakurai's Super NES game Kirby Super Star (1996) features a battle against Wham Bam Rock, a character that uses its hands to fight, similar to Master Hand. Sakurai said he was not consciously recreating this boss fight with Master Hand, though the Wham Bam Rock boss specifications were reused. Master Hand was voiced by Jeff Manning in the Nintendo 64 game, Dean Harrington in Melee (2001), and Pat Cashman in Brawl (2008). He has been voiced by Xander Mobus since Super Smash Bros. for Nintendo 3DS and Wii U (2014). Each voice actor also voiced the announcer in their respective games, along with Crazy Hand since his debut in Melee.

== Appearances ==
In Super Smash Bros. for the Nintendo 64, Master Hand serves as both the instigator of battles between Nintendo characters and the final boss. In the intro, Master Hand arranges a battlefield and places inanimate dolls of Nintendo characters such as Mario and Kirby, causing them to come to life. Unlike normal battles in Super Smash Bros., which are won by knocking an opponent off of a stage, Master Hand cannot be knocked away and can only be defeated by depleting his health. In Melee, Master Hand reappears as a boss character. Under certain circumstances, Master Hand will be accompanied by Crazy Hand, a variant of his that fights more erratically. Through a glitch on the character select menu, known as the Name Entry Glitch, Master Hand can become a playable character. Starting with Melee, each game has a collectible object, such as a trophy, featuring Master Hand. In Brawl's story mode, Master Hand gives orders to the villain Ganondorf. He is later revealed to be under the control of the true antagonist, Tabuu; once he breaks free, he attempts to fight Tabuu, but is defeated.

In Super Smash Bros. for Nintendo 3DS and Wii U, under certain circumstances, Master Hand will transform into a new Master Core form upon being defeated. Master Core is capable of transforming into different forms, including Master Giant, Master Beast, Master Edges, and Master Shadow, a clone of the player's character. In the Wii U version, it will also transform into Master Fortress, a large labyrinth the player must navigate to defeat him. A new mode, Master Orders, features Master Hand offering different challenges for the player to complete. In Super Smash Bros. Ultimate (2018), Master Hand appears in the World of Light story mode under the control of the antagonist Galeem. Galeem creates replicas of him to use as pawns in a battle against fellow antagonist Dharkon, whose minions are replicas of Crazy Hand. When the real Master Hand and Crazy Hand are both defeated, they are freed from their control, creating a path to defeat both Galeem and Dharkon. Master Hand is also playable in a battle against various copies of Super Smash Bros. fighters near the end of the World of Light mode.

Master Hand and Crazy Hand appear in Kirby & the Amazing Mirror (2004) as a boss fight, using their attacks from Super Smash Bros. When defeated, Kirby can eat him, giving Kirby attacks from his Super Smash Bros. appearance.

== Reception ==
Master Hand has been well received. IGN readers voted Master Hand one of the 10 best game bosses. Den of Geek writer Gavin Jasper regarded him one of the best boss battles. He enjoyed that, instead of using a preexisting character, the developers created a "random" boss, comparing the fight with Master Hand to the fight between Sid and the toys in Toy Story (1995). He described each Super Smash Bros. game adding "needless context" to Master Hand as a "special kind of weird." Fellow Den of Geek writer Chris Freiberg considered the Master Hand battle in the Nintendo 64 game one of fighting games' most memorable bosses. He praised Master Hand as a boss who does not follow the same rules as Super Smash Bros.'s other bosses, creating a challenging experience. GamesTM staff agreed with this assessment, stating that the fight with Master Hand subverting the rules established thus far was the most interesting part of his fight. They felt that it was anticlimactic to fight him after fighting a "gamut of legendary fighters", though they still felt it memorable due to how bizarre it was.

Daryl Baxter, author of 50 Years of Boss Fights: Video Game Legends, considered the fight between Master Hand and Crazy Hand memorable, highlighting aspects such as their non-playable status, Crazy Hand appearing in the middle, and the "challenge and panic" associated with fighting Crazy Hand. He called fighting Crazy Hand anxiety-inducing, part of what made Super Smash Bros. so "unpredictable and fun." IGN's Tom Marks called Master Hand's playable appearance in Super Smash Bros. Ultimate one of the best moments of 2018. He said it made him feel nostalgic, as it made his dream of playing as Master Hand real.

Master Hand's unclear origins and motives has led to speculation and theories about who or what he represents. InvenGlobal's Olivia Richman identified theories that he could represent Sakurai, different types of gamers, or the imagination of a child. IGN writer Michael Thomsen called the premise of Master Hand creating the conceit for the characters in the original game clever. He described Master Hand as a "centralizing villain" who represents the "immature state of mind of a person capable of investing themselves in an absurd fantasy world where Mario would have to fight ten Captain Falcon's in a row." Kill Screen writer Erik Fredner felt that Master Hand could be interpreted in multiple ways, including "the unmoved mover, the master's (meaning game-maker's) hand, and, from a certain vantage point, the player". He likened Master Hand and the Super Smash Bros. fighters to the comic strip character Calvin and his stuffed tiger Hobbes, with Master Hand "moving [the fighters] around, hitting their karate-chop buttons". Fredner cited an in-game description referring to Master Hand as the "symbolic link between the real world and the imaginary battlefields", adding that the fight against Master Hand, who he argued represents the player, represents the player overcoming their limitations.

In the book Metagaming: Playing, Competing, Spectating, Cheating, Trading, Making, and Breaking Videogames, authors Stephanie Boluk and Patrick LeMieux argued Master Hand represents staff involved in Super Smash Bros.'s development, including Sakurai and former HAL Laboratory CEO Satoru Iwata. They compared Master Hand's ability to bring toys to life to the "long tradition of the hand of the animator that appears at the birth of film itself", and that after this cutscene, the control switches to the "interactive hand of the player." They wrote that the Melee glitch making Master Hand playable represents the player subverting Sakurai's rules and that the description of him as a link between Super Smash Bros. and the real world carried a significance that Sakurai could not have anticipated.
