= Eric Kelso =

American voice actor

- Born: December 22
- Education: University of California at Santa Barbara
- Occupations: Voice actor; director; presenter; producer
- Years active: 1988–present
- Website: erickelso.com

Eric Kelso (born December 22) is an American voice actor, director, presenter and producer currently based in Tokyo, Japan.

He is best known as the voice of Paul Phoenix in the video game series, Tekken, as well as Guizhang Chen, Masayuki Fukuhara, and Ren of Heavens in the Shenmue series, Captain Falcon, and Blood Falcon in F-Zero GX, and Jacky Bryant in the Virtua Fighter series. Outside of video games, he has also provided voices for many Japanese TV shows, films, radio programs.

== Early life ==
Eric Kelso attended high school in Santa Cruz, California and went to the University at Santa Barbara where he majored in Film Studies. While at UCSB he received a Corwin Metropolitan Film Award for writing and directing the short film, "an echo en route".

After graduating in 1986, he set out to travel the world in search of documentary film subjects. He eventually made his way to his current long-time residence of Japan.

== Career ==
=== Narration ===
Kelso has been active in Japan doing English-language and Japanese-language voiceovers for movies, television shows, children's programs and educational broadcasting. In 1995, Kelso provided live interactive voiceover and CG movement work for Mr. Mike, a sarcastic talking microphone character, around the world. Notable events include TELECOM 95 in Geneva, Switzerland, as well as at ASIA TELECOM 97 in Singapore.

He voiced the Japanese movie trailer for Disney's Mulan, as well as the part of River Guide in the Wild River Splash VR Simulator ride for DreamWorks at SEGA's Joypolis in Tokyo. In 2006, shortly after the merger of Tomy and Takara, Kelso provided the voice for the Omnibot 2007: i-SOBOT, which has been certified by Guinness World Records as "the world's smallest humanoid robot in production".

Kelso has been a director and producer for corporate video recordings for companies such as Prologis Inc. and Medtronic.

=== Voice acting ===
Kelso began voice acting for the video game industry in 1996. In 2001, he voiced the character Paul Phoenix in the fighting video game, Tekken 4. In 2004, Kelso reprised this role in 5 and continued to voice the character in Dark Resurrection and 6.

In 2000, Kelso provided voices for the English dub of the Sega Dreamcast game, Shenmue. Playing the roles of Masayuki Fukuhara and Guizhang Chen, Kelso noted how expansive the project was, having a more developed storyline and more dialogue than other games at the time. In 2001, Kelso became the voice for another fighting game character in Virtua Fighter 3 called Jacky Bryant. He also reprised the role in Virtua Fighter 5, as well as side projects featuring the character, such as, Sega Superstars, Virtua Quest, Sonic & Sega All-Stars Racing, and Dead or Alive 5 Ultimate In 2002, Kelso also worked on the sequel to Shenmue, Shenmue II, voicing a new character in the franchise, Wuying Ren "of Heavens". The English dub of the game appeared in the re-released version on the Microsoft Xbox console as well as the high-definition ports for Microsoft Windows, PlayStation 4 and Xbox One.

== Filmography ==
=== Television ===
Year	Title	Role	Notes	Ref.
	Doraemon	unknown	Gakken English dub	
1993–1998	Iron Chef	Masaharu Morimoto; Yoshiro Mori	Live-action English dub	
2001	Zoids: Century Neo	Additional voices	Alternate English dub; pilot	
2015	Air Bound	Ace, Owen, Buck Tooth	International English dub	
2017	Sakura Quest	Mayor Naumann	Japanese dub (Ep. 25)	
2023	The Marginal Service	Character Naration		

=== Film ===
Year	Title	Role	Notes	Ref.
2016	Under the Dog	Soldier		

=== Video games ===
Year	Title	Role	Notes	Ref.
1996	Virtua Fighter 3	Jacky Bryant		
1997	Soul Edge		English dub	
2000	Slashout	Slash		
2000	Gungriffon Blaze	Various		
2000	Shenmue	Masayuki Fukuhara, Guizhang Chen	English dub	
2001	Virtua Fighter 4	Jacky Bryant		
2001	Tekken 4	Paul Phoenix	Select voice samples re-used in 5 and 6	
2001	Planet of the Apes	Various		
2001	Universal Studios Theme Parks Adventure	Woody Woodpecker, Biff Tannen		
2002	Shenmue II	Wuying Ren		
2003	Dino Crisis 3	Jacob Ranshaw	Motion capture	
2003	F-Zero GX	Captain Falcon, Blood Falcon		
2003	Glass Rose	Takashi Kagetani, Kazuya	English dub	
2003	Bloody Roar 4	Reiji Takigawa	English dub	
2004	Firefighter F.D.18	Dean McGregor	Credited as Erick Kelso	
2004	Gradius V	Pilot, Boss		
2004	Taiko: Drum Master	Various		
2004	Boktai 2: Solar Boy Django	Dainn, Kid, Coffin Shopkeeper, Ennio	English dub	
2004	Sega Superstars	Jacky Bryant		
2004	Tekken 5	Paul Phoenix		
2004	Baten Kaitos	Kalas	English dub	
2004	Metal Wolf Chaos	Additional voices		
2005	Virtua Quest	Jacky Bryant	English dub	
2005	Shining Force Neo	Klein	English dub	
2005	Tekken 5: Dark Resurrection	Paul Phoenix		
2006	Virtua Fighter 5	Jacky Bryant		
2006	Elebits	Ed (Dad)	English dub	
2006	Dance Dance Revolution: Disney Mix	Various		
2007	Lunar Knights	Duke Dumas, Kay	English dub	
2007	Dynasty Warriors: Gundam	Various		
2007	Mega Max ZX Advent	Aeolus	English dub	
2007	Tekken 6	Paul Phoenix		
2010	Sonic & SEGA All-Stars Racing	Jacky Bryant		
2010	Ace Combat: Joint Assault	Michael Arena	English dub	
2013	Dead or Alive 5 Ultimate	Jacky Bryant		
2015	Dead or Alive 5 Last Round	Jacky Bryant		
2015	Transformers Pachinko	Optimus Prime		
2015	Time Crisis 5	Marc Godart	English dub	
2015	Devil’s Third Online	Various		
2016	NightCry	Harry, Newscaster, HQ	English dub	
2016	Pokémon Tretta	Announcer		

=== Radio ===
Year	Title	Role	Notes	Ref.
1991	New York and Boston with Eric	Host		
1991–1992	Radio Eikawa	Host		
1992	Florida with Eric	Host		

=== Narration ===
Year	Title	Medium	Notes	Ref.
1998	Mulan	Film trailer	Japanese version	

=== Other voice work ===
Year	Title	Role	Notes	Ref.
1995	Mr. Mike		Voice, motion capture; Interactive CG	
2001	Universal Studios Japan	Woody Woodpecker	Theme Park	
2007	i-SOBOT		English voice; Robot	
2019	Ultra Galaxy Fight: New Generation Heroes	Ultra Dark-Killer	YouTube web series; English dub	
2020	Ultra Galaxy Fight: The Absolute Conspiracy	Ultraman Zero, Ultraman Great	YouTube web series; English dub	
