= Jeff Manning =

American actor

- Born: Utah, U.S.
- Other name: Jeffrey Manning
- Occupations: Voice actor, narrator
- Years active: 1995–present
- Agent: Triple Sun Talent

Jeff Manning, also credited as Jeffrey Manning, is an American voice actor and narrator based in Japan. He is known primarily for his work on the North American English dub of Iron Chef, as well as roles in several video games and voice-overs on numerous television commercials. He is perhaps best known as the Announcer and Master Hand in the first Super Smash Bros. game on the Nintendo 64. He previously worked for Mickey's Company, an agency based in Japan. He now works for Triple Sun Talent, another agency based in Japan.

== Bio ==
A native of Utah, and an alumnus of Brigham Young University, Manning first came to Japan as a missionary for the Church of Jesus Christ of Latter-day Saints. He returned there in 1983 to work for Frontier Enterprises doing studio dubbing.

== Notable roles ==
=== Anime ===
Year	Title	Role	Notes	Source
1986	Cyborg 009: The Legend of the Super Galaxy	Chang Changku / 006	English Dub	
1999, 2000	Sensual Phrase	Freddie Brown, Rupert Grazer	Eps. 31, 33, 44; Original Japanese dub	
2001	Detective Conan	Ed McKay	Eps. 238–239; Original Japanese dub	
2007	Ghost Hunt	Dr. Oliver Davis/Raymond Wall	Ep. 20; Original Japanese dub	
2012	Little Charo: Tohoku-hen	Mage, Yoshio	Eps. 3, 7 English Dub	
2012	Kids on the Slope	Male Customer	Ep. 4 Original Japanese dub	
2014	Sword Art Online II	NPC Gunman	Ep. 4 Original Japanese dub	
2019	Detective Conan: The Fist of Blue Sapphire	Zhon Han Chen	Original Japanese dub	
2019	Free! Road to the World - the Dream	Albert Volandel	Original Japanese dub	
2022	Free! The Final Stroke	Albert Volandel	Original Japanese dub	

- Azuki-chan – Billy (original Japanese dub)
- Arashi no Yoru Ni: Himitsu no Tomodachi – Butch, Ghiro, Tap
- The Dagger of Kamui – Goldgun, Jackal
- Vengeance of the Space Pirate – Black Commander
- Free: Dive to the Future - Albert Volandel (original Japanese dub)

=== Live action ===
- Iron Chef – Kitchen Reporter Shinichiro Ohta
- Johnson and Friends – Johnson, Alfred (Japanese dub of Australian series)
- Ultra Galaxy Fight: New Generation Heroes - Voice of Ultraman Rosso
- Ultra Galaxy Fight: The Absolute Conspiracy - Voice of Ultraman Titas, Ultraman Neos and Andro Melos

=== Video games ===
Year	Title	Role	Platform	Source
1991	Ys III: Wanderers from Ys	King McGuire	TurboGrafx-CD	
1996	Clock Tower	Nolan Campbell	PlayStation	
1997	The Note	Toshi	PlayStation	
1997	Willy Wombat	Tagdor	Sega Saturn	
1997	Ray Tracers	Jalta Lang	PlayStation	
1998	Soulcalibur	Announcer	Arcade / Dreamcast / iOS / Xbox 360 / Android	
1999	Super Smash Bros.	Announcer, Master Hand	Nintendo 64	
1999	Countdown Vampires	Keith J. Snyder	PlayStation	
2000	Chase The Express	Phillip Mason	PlayStation	
2000	Shenmue	Susumu Akutagawa	Dreamcast / Windows / PlayStation 4 / Xbox One	
2001	Blaster Master: Blasting Again	Kaiser, Murph, Ringage	PlayStation	
2002	Virtua Fighter 4	Lion Rafale	Arcade / PlayStation 2	
2003	Transformers Tataki	Megatron / Galvatron	PlayStation 2	
2004	Glass Rose	Matsunosuke Shimada, Jungo Ogasawara	PlayStation 2	
2004	Baten Kaitos: Eternal Wings and the Lost Ocean	Rodolfo	GameCube	
2005	Virtua Quest	Lion Rafale	GameCube / PlayStation 2	
2005	Shining Force Neo	Max	PlayStation 2	
2007	Virtua Fighter 5	Lion Rafale	Arcade / PlayStation 3 / Xbox 360	
2007	Mega Man ZX Advent	Bifrost	Nintendo DS	
2010	Tatsunoko vs. Capcom: Ultimate All-Stars	Announcer	Arcade / Wii	
2010	Ace Combat: Joint Assault	Additional voices	PlayStation Portable	
2017	Super Bomberman R	Red Bomberman	Nintendo Switch / PlayStation 4 / Windows / Xbox One	
2020	Ninjala	Announcer	Nintendo Switch	
TBA	Combo Devils	Announcer	Windows	

- Air Gallet – Narration
- D1GP – Judge
- Ka 2: Let's Go Hawaii – various roles
- Shenmue II – additional voices (Xbox version)
- Unison: Rebels of Rhythm & Dance – various roles

==== Video game modifications ====
Year	Title	Role	Platform	Source
2025	Smash Remix	Announcer, Master Hand	Nintendo 64	
