= Penny Racers =

Penny Racers may refer to:

- Choro-Q, Japanese toy line released in the US as Penny Racers
  - Penny Racers (1996 video game) for PlayStation
  - Penny Racers (1998 video game) for Nintendo 64
  - Penny Racers also known as Choro Q HG or Gadget Racers for PlayStation 2
  - Penny Racers also known as Choro Q Advance or Gadget Racers for Game Boy Advance
  - Penny Racers Party: Turbo Q Speedway for Wii
