= Road Trip: The Arcade Edition =

2002 video game

- PAL region cover art
- Developer: Hudson Soft
- Publishers: JP: Takara; PAL: Zoo Digital Publishing; NA: Conspiracy Entertainment
- Series: Choro Q series
- Platform: GameCube
- Release: JP: December 19, 2002; PAL: December 5, 2003; NA: March 16, 2004
- Genre: Racing
- Modes: Single-player, multiplayer

Road Trip: The Arcade Edition, known as Gadget Racers in Europe and Choro Q! in Japan, is a racing video game released in 2002 by Takara. It is based mainly upon Road Trip Adventure, a predecessor, however was only sold for the PlayStation 2. Allowing this, weapons were added to a more racing perspective to make it an arcade version. It involves toy cars known in as Choro-Q or Penny Racers.

== Gameplay ==
Players choose which of the 10 cars they will be driving. Some modes are: Challenge Race, Drag Racing, and Grand Prix. Players must complete tracks in Challenge Race and Grand Prix in order to play additional cars in any given game. The tracks for the races are called: Road Trip Circuit, Road Trip Park, After School, Kid's Room, Road Trip Highway, and Silver Village. The tracks will be short, middle, long, short reversed, middle reversed, and long reversed. Successful players may work up to 100 cars and many more parts including the legendary Devil Magnimum engine and the Road Trip Hurtle.

The game includes six different tracks, as well as three different lengths of the tracks, short, medium, and long. the tracks can also be unlocked in reverse mode, heightening the total number of tracks to 36. These Environments Include Road Trip Circuit, A track that starts out as an oval track that eventually increases to a massive circuit on the shoreline, Road Trip Park, An Offroad track that takes place in a nature park, and features bridges, jungle gyms, and a short river, After School, a track that takes racers around a school after hours, and one of its more notable sections is the pool area, where the player had to stay on the 'Floaties' to avoid falling into the water and losing speed, Kid's Room, a track that is made up of many toys and some school supplies. another notable aspect of this track is the spinning tops arena, similar to the "Beyblade" Toys. Road Trip Highway is a very futuristic highway course decorated with several tall buildings and holographic billboards. the track has several 'potholes' in the road, and one some areas of the track, electric fences that slow cars down. the final track, Silver Village, starts out in the small village that is supposedly the Silver Village, but quickly enters a massive and dangerous mountain, with broken bridges, oddly colored caves, and is decorated with snowmen. the track's finale being a ski jump.

100 "Bodies" are available for the vehicles, including VW Beetles, SUV's Pickup Trucks, Sports Cars, Emergency Vehicles, Other Utility Trucks, a model-T like vehicle with a pumpkin for a cockpit, and A Rubber Duck. The Bodies, however, are just for looks, as well are the accessories. Players can also modify the two colors of their vehicles, and the tire colors as well, and can also rename their bodies. Tires, suspension, and equipped weapons affect the vehicles' performance. One Engine Part of notability is the Legendary Devil Magnum Engine. There are Monster Truck sized versions of the available Tires, But the size of them also affects the vehicle's performance.

There are several weapons in the game that players can use to hinder other racers, or use to help themselves. The Shield coin protects players from enemy fire three times, but prevents players from getting other weapons. The Niro boosts allow a player to increase their speed for a short amount of time. The Weight Coin causes a large weight to appear on the car ahead of the player, and can be shaken off with the spin function. The Super Weight Coin does the same to all of the players ahead of the player. Oil Slick can be dropped like a mine, and causes other players to skid out of control. Weapons can be mounted on the players' vehicles, which range from Sniper Rifles to Machine Guns, as well as Shotguns and Bazookas. If the player has a Weapon, so will all of the CPU players. Without a weapon, the ammo pickup gives the player a Missile.

The Shop in the game has all of the above-mentioned parts for purchase, but the inventory expands as players progress through the game. Some vehicles can only be unlocked by winning 1st place in career mode races and tournaments, most of the unlockable bodies can only be bought from the shop, as well as all the other unlockable parts, minus the Devil Magnum, which can only be unlocked when the player returns to their garage after collecting all 100 Vehicles. Once a player has purchased everything in the shop, a license plate with the words, "Woo-Hoo!" appears whenever they enter the shop.

Minigames include Drag Racing, Chicken (in which players brake on the checkered line before falling off a cliff) and shooting game where one player drives and collects ammo (such as missiles, minigun ammo, and shotgun ammo) while another player controls the equipped weapon, First-Person Style, and attempts to shoot the opposing vehicle three times. There is also an unlockable minigame in which players jump over hurdles and finish as fast as possible.

== Reception ==
Reception

Aggregate score
Aggregator	Score
Metacritic	61/100

Review scores
Publication	Score
Famitsu	26/40
GameZone	5/10
Nintendo Power	2.6/5
Nintendo World Report	5.5/10

The game received "mixed" reviews according to the review aggregation website Metacritic. Nintendo Power gave the game a mixed review over nine months before it was released. In Japan, Famitsu gave it a score of one six, two sevens, and one six for a total of 26 out of 40.
