= Choro Q Wonderful! =

1999 video game

- Developer: E-game
- Publisher: Takara
- Director: Etsuhiro Wada
- Producer: Takeshi Ikenoue
- Composer: Fumio Tanabe
- Series: Choro Q
- Platform: PlayStation
- Release: JP: August 5, 1999
- Genre: Racing

Choro Q Wonderful! (チョロQワンダフォー!) is a 1999 role-playing and racing video game for the PlayStation, developed by E-game and published by Takara. It is the successor to the Tamsoft-developed Choro Q 3 and hence the third sequel to Penny Racers (1996); the "Wonderful" name in its title, in Japanese pronunciation, is a pun on "four". An English-language fan translation was released in 2023.

== Gameplay ==
Gameplay screenshot showing a dialog between the player car and another character

Choro Q Wonderful! was the first Choro Q video game to incorporate plot-based progression with role-playing elements.

== Reception and legacy ==
Famitsu scored the game 26 out of 40. In an import review, PLAY UK magazine scored it 66% calling it "not wonderful, just plain dull...".

In 2002, E-game and Takara produced Road Trip Adventure on the PlayStation 2 which was localized globally, with a similar racing-RPG concept.
