= Road Trip Adventure =

2002 video game

Road Trip Adventure Road Trip
- European cover art
- Developer: E-Game Inc.
- Publishers: JP: Takara; NA: Conspiracy Entertainment; PAL: Play It
- Designer: Etsuhiro Wada
- Series: Choro Q
- Platform: PlayStation 2
- Release: JP: January 10, 2002; NA: October 26, 2002; EU: May 2003; AU: July 2003
- Genre: Racing / Adventure
- Modes: Single player, multiplayer

Road Trip Adventure (Note: Japanese: チョロQ HG2 (Choro Q High Grade 2); Released as Everywhere Road Trip in North America) is a 2002 racing adventure video game for the PlayStation 2 that forms as the sequel to Choro Q HG, released the year prior. It was developed by a small Japanese developer named E-Game and published by Takara. The game was localized as a budget title in North America and PAL regions by Conspiracy Entertainment and Play It in 2003, with the removal of any references to the Choro Q toys.

The game combines elements of open world racing and adventure games, and is widely considered to be the best of the Choro Q video games due to its large seamless world, which the player can freely explore. The game takes place in a world of anthropomorphic cars that interact like humans. A successor game, Road Trip: The Arcade Edition, was released on the GameCube in the same year.

== Story ==
A typical snapshot of Adventure Mode gameplay.

When starting a new game in Adventure mode, the player can enter their name and preferences, as well as a name for the game's currency. Upon entering these details, a cutscene begins inside the office of President Forest, who has become weary of his role in office. He declares that he will hand over the presidency to the winner of the World Grand Prix, a seven race series for only the most elite and talented racers. The president's secretary leaves, ready to broadcast this news to the world.

Next, the player appears inside the Q’s Factory in Peach Town, a small town named after the surrounding peach farms. Each town's Q's Factory is where the player changes car parts they have collected and bought. The worker in the Q's Factory informs the player that he or she may become president, if lucky enough to win the World Grand Prix.

After these starting scenes, gameplay is almost entirely open-ended, loosely centered around the goal of winning the World Grand Prix and becoming president. To qualify for the World Grand Prix, the player must have two teammates and a Class Super A License, earned by finishing within the top 6 in every race of each license tier: C, B, and A, respectively. To acquire teammates, one can simply talk to other cars; if they can be recruited, they may ask the player to add them as a teammate, provided the player has previously won a race. Each race rewards the performance of the player's teammates, as well as the player’s. As a result, it is important for the player to equip their teammates with adequate parts for each race.

To measure a player's achievement, there are 100 "stamps" which they can earn, one of which is becoming president. Stamps involve activities ranging from mini-games to doing small favors for other cars, and upon earning all 100, the player is eligible for a special surprise. As an example, one of the 100 stamps requires completing the player's picture album. To take a picture, the player can visit any of the 100 Quick-Pic Shops, denoted by black marks on the mini-map; after taking a picture, the owner (always a pink Toyota Vitz) will inform the player of the next shop's location. Another important stamp entails collecting all 100 Choro Q coins hidden in the cities around the world (with the exception of Cloud Hill). One of the residents of My City trades various parts and objects for Choro Q coins, and many of these parts can give the player a distinct advantage in other tasks, including winning the World Grand Prix. Each city contains a bar, whose owner can give hints as to the whereabouts of nearby coins.

Additionally, a major recurring theme is populating "My City," the city which the player founds as the first resident. To build up My City, the player must talk to many different cars throughout the world and find those interested in starting a new life or building new homes or shops. As more and more residents move to My City, those residents' houses and shops appear throughout the city, each building being themed after the architectural style of its resident's hometown. Once complete, My City contains a school, fire department, police station, Q's Factory, Body Shop, Parts Shop, Paint Shop, parks, residential houses and more.

== Gameplay ==
=== Economy ===
At the start of the game, the player is asked to specify a name for the currency used for the rest of the game. Money is central to Road Trip Adventure, as it is necessary to purchase most parts. To win money, one can race, advertise for various shops, sell parts to a resident of My City, or even play roulette. Five shops can provide a small above-car billboard to advertise with: the coffee shop in Peach Town (10 currency per km), a noodle restaurant in Fuji City (20 currency per km), a cake shop in Sandpolis (30 currency per km), a wool shop in White Mountain (40 currency per km), and a coconut shop in Papaya Island (50 currency per km). Each shop gives you a certain amount of money per kilometer driven while equipped with its respective advertisement sign. The player can also put one sign on each teammate.

=== Minigames ===
There are around 20 minigames in Road Trip Adventure. Completing them earns money, stamps and parts. These minigames include soccer, roulette, and drag races.

=== Locations ===
The following is a list of cities in Adventure Mode in the order in which they are typically first encountered. The world in Adventure Mode, with the exception of Cloud Hill, is cyclic, meaning that one can driving through all the cities consecutively and return to the original location of Peach Town.

| City | Description | Street style | Race tracks |
|---|---|---|---|
| Peach Town | Themed after the archetypal small town, surrounded by countryside | Tarmac, earth, grass | Peach Raceway 1 and 2 |
| Fuji City | Japanese-themed city | Earth | Ninja Temple Raceway, Temple Raceway |
| My City | The player's own, which they advertise to gather diverse new residents | Tarmac | Endurance Run |
| Sandpolis | Modeled after Las Vegas, largest city in the game | Tarmac, earth | Desert Raceway, Night Glow Raceway |
| Chestnut Canyon | A Grand Canyon-esque town atop a hill | Rock, earth | Miner 49er Raceway, Lava Run Raceway |
| Mushroom Road | A mushroom-themed town in a forest, smallest city in the game | Earth, mud | River Raceway, Slick Track, Oval Raceway |
| White Mountain | A snowy town centered around a mountain | Snow, earth | Snow Mountain Raceway |
| Papaya Island | Tropical island, reachable by driving through the ocean | Earth, sand | Lagoon Raceway, Sunny Beach Raceway |
| Cloud Hill | A collection of floating islands in the sky, accessible only from a house on Papaya Island | Tarmac, metal | Tin Raceway |

== Soundtrack ==
In the US and European versions, there are two radio stations to choose from. The Japanese version's radio feature is more extensive, featuring an additional station with voiced DJs.

The first station includes slight remixes of the following songs:

- The Push Kings - The Minute
- The Push Kings - Sunday on the West Side
- The Push Kings - Wild Ones
- The Waking Hours - Jade

The second station consists of instrumental tracks, some of which are uncredited arrangements of songs composed by Michael Walthius. The game's overall music and sound are credited to Fumio Tanabe.

== Release ==
The game was originally released in Japan on January 10, 2002.

British developer System 3 acquired the publishing rights to the game in PAL regions, and released it in May 2003 under their newly-formed division Play It, which focused on releasing "new, previously unreleased titles" for the system at budget prices. It formed as one of four titles initially released under the brand, with other titles including fellow Takara titles Seek and Destroy and Pinball, and Canadian title Cel Damage Overdrive.

System 3 released the game on the PlayStation Store for the PlayStation 3 in Europe on February 15, 2012, as a PS2 Classics release.

== Reception ==
Reception

Aggregate score
| Aggregator | Score |
|---|---|
| Metacritic | 80/100 |

Review scores
| Publication | Score |
|---|---|
| Eurogamer | 7/10 |
| Famitsu | 26/40 |
| GamesMaster | 65% |
| GameSpy | 3/5 |
| GameZone | 7.5/10 |
| PlayStation Official Magazine – UK | 6/10 |
| Official U.S. PlayStation Magazine | 4/5 |

Road Trip received "favorable" reviews according to the review aggregation website Metacritic. The game was praised for its wide world to explore and great depth, but criticized for its sound.
