= List of Choro Q video games =

Racing video game series

Japanese Choro-Q logo

This is a list of video games based on Choro-Q, a line of toy cars produced by Japanese toy company Takara (later Takara Tomy). The series is primarily made up of racing video games, many of which feature customization and role-playing video game elements. Several developers have produced games for the series, the majority of which are published by Takara. Some of these games have been localised for Western release under different names, including Penny Racers, Gadget Racers, and Road Trip, by publishers such as Atlus, Conspiracy Entertainment, and Midas Interactive Entertainment.

== Games ==
List of Choro Q video games
Title	Original release date		
Title	Japan	North America	PAL region
Choro-Q	March 22, 1996	—N/a	October 1, 1996
Notes: Released on the PlayStation; Developed by Tamsoft, published by Takara in Japan and Sony Computer Entertainment in Europe; Released under the name Penny Racers in Europe; "The Best" budget re-release in December 6, 1996 as Choro-Q VER 1.02, published by Takara
Choro-Q 2	February 21, 1997	—N/a	—N/a
Notes: Released on the PlayStation; Developed by Tamsoft, published by Takara; "The Best" budget re-release in July 23, 1998, published by Takara.
Choro-Q 3	February 19, 1998	—N/a	—N/a
Notes: Released on the PlayStation; Developed by Tamsoft, published by Takara; "The Best" budget re-release in May 4, 1999, published by Takara; "PS one Books" budget re-release in June 24, 2004, published by Atlus
Choro-Q Jet: Rainbow Wings	February 16, 1998	—N/a	—N/a
Notes: Released on the PlayStation; Developed by Astro Vision, published by Takara; "The Best" budget re-release in January 13, 2000, published by Takara; "PS one Books" budget re-release in June 24, 2004, published by Atlus
Choro-Q Park	March 26, 1998	—N/a	—N/a
Notes: Released on the Sega Saturn; Developed by Nextech, published by Takara; "Sega Saturn Collection" budget re-release in March 11, 1999, published by Nextech
Choro-Q Marine: Q-Boat	June 25, 1998	—N/a	—N/a
Notes: Released on the PlayStation; Developed by Barnhouse Effect, published by Takara; "The Best" budget re-release in August 12, 1999, published by Takara; "PS one Books" budget re-release in June 24, 2004, published by Atlus
Choro-Q 64	July 17, 1998	February 4, 1999	March 5, 1999
Notes: Released on the Nintendo 64; Developed by Locomotive, published by Takara in Japan and THQ in North America and Europe; Released under the name Penny Racers in English markets
Combat Choro-Q	February 25, 1999	—N/a	—N/a
Notes: Released on the PlayStation; Developed by Barnhouse Effect, published by Takara; "The Best" budget re-release in December 7, 2000, published by Takara; "PS one Books" budget re-release in June 24, 2004, published by Atlus
Choro-Q Hyper Customable GB	July 30, 1999	—N/a	—N/a
Notes: Released on the Game Boy Color; Developed by Electronic Applications, published by Takara
Choro-Q Wonderful!	August 5, 1999	—N/a	—N/a
Notes: Released on the PlayStation; Developed by E-game, published by Takara; Compatible with the PocketStation; "The Best" budget re-release in August 23, 2001, published by Takara; "PS one Books" budget re-release in June 24, 2004, published by Atlus
Choro-Q 64 2: Hachamecha Grand Prix Race	December 24, 1999	—N/a	—N/a
Notes: Released on the Nintendo 64; Developed by Locomotive, published by Takara
Perfect Choro-Q	August 11, 2000	—N/a	—N/a
Notes: Released on the Game Boy Color; Developed by Electronic Applications, published by Takara
Choro-Q HG	December 21, 2000	August 21, 2001	November 24, 2001
Notes: Released on the PlayStation 2; Developed by Barnhouse Effect, published by Takara in Japan, Conspiracy Entertainment in North America, and Midas Interactive Entertainment in Europe; Released under the name Gadget Racers in North America and Penny Racers in Europe; Was included in the Choro-Q HG Jenny High Grade Box edition; "The Best" budget re-release in July 11, 2002, published by Takara
Choro-Q Advance	June 29, 2001	October 29, 2001	October 18, 2002
Notes: Released on the Game Boy Advance; Developed by Electronic Applications, published by Takara in Japan, Conspiracy Entertainment in North America, and Xicat Interactive in Europe; Released under the name Gadget Racers in North America and Penny Racers in Europe
Choro-Q HG 2	January 10, 2002	October 26, 2002	May 2003
Notes: Released on the PlayStation 2; Developed by E-game, published by Takara in Japan, Conspiracy Entertainment in North America, and Play It! in Europe; Released under the name Everywhere Road Trip in North America, Road Trip Adventure in Europe, and Choro-Q HG 2 in South Korea; "The Best" budget re-release in July 10, 2003, published by Takara.; "Atlus Best" budget re-release in February 8, 2007, published by Atlus
Shin Combat Choro-Q	June 27, 2002	December 11, 2002	January 24, 2003
Notes: Released on the PlayStation 2; Developed by Barnhouse Effect, published by Takara in Japan, Conspiracy Entertainment in North America, and Play It! in Europe; Released under the name Seek and Destroy in English markets and as Shin Combat Choro-Q in South Korea.; "Atlus Best" budget re-release in February 16, 2006, published by Atlus
Combat Choro-Q: Advance Daisakusen	August 8, 2002	—N/a	—N/a
Notes: Released on the Game Boy Advance; Published by Takara
Choro-Q Advance 2	November 28, 2002	June 14, 2003	April 6, 2004
Notes: Released on the Game Boy Advance; Developed by Electronic Applications, published by Takara in Japan, Conspiracy Entertainment in North America, and ZOO Digital Publishing in Europe; Released under the name Road Trip: Shifting Gears in North America and Gadget Racers in Europe
Choro-Q HG 3	December 12, 2002	—N/a	December 5, 2003
Notes: Released on the PlayStation 2; Developed by Barnhouse Effect, published by Takara in Japan and ZOO Digital Publishing in Europe; Released under the name Gadget Racers in Europe; Announced for North American distribution by Conspiracy Entertainment as Road Trip: Adventure Avenue, but never released; "The Best" budget re-release in November 11, 2004, published by Takara.; "Atlus Best" budget re-release in February 7, 1999, published by Atlus
Choro-Q!	December 19, 2002	December 5, 2003	March 16, 2004
Notes: Released on the GameCube; Developed by Hudson Soft, published by Takara in Japan, Conspiracy Entertainment in North America, and ZOO Digital Publishing in Europe; Released under the name Road Trip: The Arcade Edition in North America and Gadget Racers in Europe
Choro-Q HG 4	November 27, 2003	November 17, 2004	March 25, 2005
Notes: Released on the PlayStation 2; Developed by Barnhouse Effect, published by Takara in Japan, Atlus in North America, and ZOO Digital Publishing in Europe; Released under the name ChoroQ in English markets.; "Atlus Best" budget re-release in December 15, 2005, published by Atlus
Choro-Q Works	May 26, 2005	—N/a	—N/a
Notes: Released on the PlayStation 2; Developed by Barnhouse Effect, published by Atlus
Choro-Q Wii	February 28, 2008	October 7, 2008	—N/a
Notes: Released on the Wii; Developed by Barnhouse Effect, published by TakaraTomy in Japan and Tomy in North America; Released under the name Penny Racers Party: Turbo Q Speedway in North America

== Cancelled games ==
List of Choro Q video games
Game	Details
Choro-Q DS Cancellation date: 2005	Proposed system release: 2005 – Nintendo DS
Choro-Q DS Cancellation date: 2005	Notes: Announced in 2004, to be published by Atlus, but never released
