= Crusader of Centy =

1994 video game

- North American cover art
- Developer: Nextech
- Publishers: JP/PAL: Sega; NA: Atlus
- Producer: Katsuji Aoyama
- Designer: Toshio Toyota
- Programmer: Yukihiko Tani
- Artist: Toshio Yamamoto
- Writer: Yayoi Onda
- Composer: Motokazu Shinoda
- Platform: Sega Genesis / Sega Mega Drive
- Release: JP: 17 June 1994; PAL: February 10, 1995; NA: March 1995
- Genre: Action-adventure
- Mode: Single-player

Crusader of Centy, (Note: Known as Shin Souseiki Ragnacënty (Japanese: 新創世紀ラグナセンティ, Hepburn: Shin Sōseiki Ragunasenti) in Japan) known as Soleil in PAL regions, is an action-adventure video game developed by Nextech for the Sega Genesis and Mega Drive. The story centers on the player character Corona, a boy who has just turned 14 years of age and must inherit his late father's sword to fight the monsters that threaten the human race's existence. Gameplay uses an overhead perspective and focuses on exploring, battling enemies with a sword, and solving puzzles. As the story progresses, numerous animals join the hero and aid him with special abilities, often granting the player passage to previously inaccessible areas.

Crusader of Centy was Nextech's second game and was conceived as an action role-playing game (RPG) due to the way in which the player consecutively gains new skills. It was commissioned by publisher Sega as part of project to offer more RPGs on its consoles during the genre's growing popularity during the 16-bit era. Initially released in Japan by Sega in 1994, Crusader of Centy was localized by the company and launched in the PAL regions the following year. Sega's North American branch passed on publishing duties in its own territory and the game was instead picked up by Atlus USA for a 1995 release, albeit with a different English translation.

Reviews for Crusader of Centy have been largely positive. It has been praised for its gameplay, graphics, and story while receiving some criticism for its controls and sound design. The game's visual presentation and many of its gameplay mechanics have been universally compared to Nintendo's The Legend of Zelda series, especially A Link to the Past for the Super Nintendo Entertainment System (SNES). Some journalists found the similarities so blatant that they branded Crusader of Centy a "Zelda clone". Crusader of Centy was re-released for the Nintendo Switch Online + Expansion Pack on June 27, 2023.

== Gameplay ==
Gameplay screenshot

Early in the game, Corona finds himself losing his ability to speak to fellow humans, and instead gaining the ability to speak to animals. Some of them will join him, lending Corona their abilities while they are "equipped". Each animal has its own special technique. The first animal the player gets is Corona's pet dog, Mac (US version) or Johnny (UK version). He can hold enemies down for Corona to attack. Later, the player gets a penguin, named Chilly (US version) or Penguy (UK version), which will power up Corona's sword with an ice attack. Corona can equip two abilities at a time. A total of 16 animals can be obtained.

== Plot ==
In Soleil Town, a law requires that all 14-year-old boys go to train and prepare for battle. The game's hero, Corona, has just turned fourteen at the beginning of the game. As such, Corona receives the sword and shield of his father, who died in battle and had a great reputation for his bravery in defending the city.

The story is divided into two parts. Corona must first take time to discover his world and unlock the various levels that make it up. He can then access them at his leisure. During this half of the game, Corona will not have the ability to speak to humans, but only to animals and plants. Only after beating Dragon (Maldra the Dragon in the US version) will the second half of the game begin. Corona regains the ability to talk to humans and will travel through time to build a better world and understand why the monsters are at war with humanity.

== Development and release ==
Crusader of Centy was developed for the Sega Genesis by Nextech. Many of the designers were part of Wolf Team and served various positions on its games. These individuals founded a new developer under the name GAU Entertainment and released the run-and-gun game Ranger X for the Genesis before renaming the company to Nextech. During the early 1990s, Sega had largely relied on action and platform games on its consoles for strong sales. However, the popularity of role-playing games was growing rapidly in Japan during this time. Despite a few standout franchises like Phantasy Star, Shining, and Lunar being exclusive to its consoles, Sega was losing that region's market to its biggest competitor Nintendo and the plethora of quality RPGs available on the SNES. Attempting to alleviate this, Sega announced the "Mega Roleplay Project" in 1994, which consisted of seven RPGs, each from a different developer, to be published for either the Genesis or Sega CD. Crusader of Centy was part of this project.

Producer, planner, and writer Yayoi Onda stated that Crusader of Centy was conceptualized as an action RPG that would be easy for anyone to play. Despite not having traditional RPG elements like experience points, she explained that the developer wished to give the player a sense of growth through the gradual acquisition of new abilities. Having animals as helpful companions was added early in development and became the central mechanic around which the game world was constructed. Onda wrote the story for Crusader of Centy to be lighthearted with several plot twists, but felt she made the dialogue too long-winded in places. The game's scenario was written prior to any of its art being created. This was the opposite approach the team had taken on Ranger X. Character and graphic designer Toshio Yamamoto was tasked with coming up with a completely separate art style from that of Ranger X. He researched how to optimize the Genesis console's color pallette as to not look inferior to the SNES. Yamamoto admitted that designing the overworld map was a challenge between having to create its terrain in pixel form and implementing the hit detection for the areas with which the player could interact. Main programmer Yukihiko Tani revealed that he did not want the numerous ideas the designers put forth in the planning stages to go to waste due to programming limitations. Many minute details were left in, such as having a unique sprite for each of the eight directions the player could face. The game's musical score was composed by pianist Motokazu Shinoda, best known for his work on the anime film Demon City Shinjuku.

The game was published by Sega in Japan under its original title Shin Souseiki Ragnacënty on June 17, 1994. It was next translated and released by Sega for European countries as Soleil on February 10, 1995. According to GameFan magazine, an official for Sega's North American branch disclosed that the subsidiary was given the option to localize either Crusader of Centy or Beyond Oasis in its own region, ultimately choosing the latter. Crusader of Centy was instead picked up by Atlus USA and published in North America in March 1995. The Atlus version featured an entirely different English translation than its PAL counterpart. Aside from minor changes to character and animal names, the Atlus version contained a more concise yet more humorous script. Religious references were removed as well. The game received its first official re-release on the Nintendo Switch Online + Expansion Pack on June 27, 2023.

== Reception ==
Contemporary reviews

Review scores
Publication	Score
Beep! MegaDrive	7.5/10
Electronic Gaming Monthly	31/40
Famitsu	6/10, 6/10, 7/10, 7/10
Game Informer	8.25/10
Game Players	80%
GameFan	285/300
Mean Machines Sega	92%
Next Generation	3/5
Electronic Games	C+
Mega	92%
Sega Magazine	89/100
Sega Power	85%
Sega Pro	88%
VideoGames	8/10

The Japanese publication Micom BASIC Magazine ranked the game fourth in popularity in its September 1994 issue, and it received a 8.0859/10 score in a 1995 readers' poll conducted by the Japanese Sega Saturn Magazine, ranking among Sega Mega Drive titles at the number 99 spot. Crusader of Centy received positive reviews from critics.

The four reviewers of Electronic Gaming Monthly contended that the game is a worthy Zelda clone, with Ed Semrad and Sushi-X going so far as to say it is equally good as the Zelda series. They identified the story and Zelda-like play mechanics as the game's strongest points. Three reviewers each scored it 8 out of 10 and one scored it 7. GamePro's Lawrence Neves viewed the game as Sega's answer to The Legend of Zelda: A Link to the Past, and remarked that "While Zelda had tons of hidden surprises, weapons, and fearsome bosses (making it one of the best action/RPGs ever), Crusader of Centy has a too-familiar story line, minor enemies, and a serious shortage of puzzles." He nonetheless concluded that, though serious RPG fans would "breeze through" it, the game successfully appeals to its younger target audience. Next Generation rated it three stars out of five, and stated that "Centy is a mirror image of the immensely popular Zelda, and is a load of fun that Genesis owners have yet to experience."

== Legacy ==
The main producer, designer, and writer of Crusader of Centy, Yayoi Onda, went on to serve similar roles for the Nextech Sega Saturn RPG Linkle Liver Story. The latter game was conceived as a sequel to the former, even having the working titles Ragnacënty 2 and Soleil at certain points before the project's direction was changed. Linkle Liver Story still retains a few key elements from its predecessor including a top-down perspective and animal companions.

Media outlets have reported that pre-owned physical copies of Crusader of Centy command relatively expensive sale prices within the video game collecting community in the decades following its original launch. Particularly high prices have been reputed for the North American version of the game.
