= Nex Entertainment =

Video game developer, formerly known as GAU Entertainment and Nextech

Nex Entertainment ネクスエンタテインメント
- Company type: Private
- Industry: Video games
- Founded: September 28, 1992; 33 years ago
- Defunct: 2016
- Headquarters: Tokyo, Japan
- Key people: Masaru Osamu Aoyama (CEO)
- Website: www.nex-ent.co.jp/

Nex Entertainment (ネクスエンタテインメント, Nekusu Entateinmento), formerly known as GAU Entertainment and Nextech (ネクステック, Nekusutekku), was a Japanese video game developer originally established in 1992. It developed games for publishers on a contract basis. Its clients included Sega, Capcom, Namco, Takara, Taito, Atlus, and Square Enix.

== History ==
Nex Entertainment was founded as GAU Entertainment and two years later the company merged into Nextech, which was bought by Sega in 1997. Nex Entertainment emerged as a third-party developer in 2003.

NEX Entertainment's major shareholder, Fields announced on July 29, 2016 that it closed the company.

== Games ==
=== Arcade ===
- Cobra the Arcade
- Time Crisis 3
- Time Crisis 4

=== Dreamcast ===
- Dino Crisis
- Dream Studio
- Resident Evil – Code: Veronica
- Resident Evil – Code: Veronica X
- Shenmue
- Type X: Spiral Nightmare (canceled)

=== Game Boy Advance ===
- Shining Soul (co-developed with Grasshopper Manufacture)
- Shining Soul II (co-developed with Grasshopper Manufacture)

=== GameCube ===
- Resident Evil – Code: Veronica X

=== iOS and Android ===
- 殉職刑事

=== Mega Drive/Genesis ===
- Crusader of Centy
- Pro Striker Final Stage
- Ranger X
- YuYu Hakusho: Gaiden

=== Nintendo DS ===
- Children of Mana
- Lupin Sansei: Shijou Saidai no Zunousen

=== Nintendo 3DS ===
- Crimson Shroud
- Weapon Shop de Omasse

=== PlayStation 2 ===
- Dynasty Tactics 2
- Lupin III: Columbus no Isan wa Akenisomaru
- Lupin III: Lupin ni wa Shi o, Zenigata ni wa Koi o
- Resident Evil – Code: Veronica X
- Resident Evil Survivor 2 Code: Veronica
- Shining Tears
- Shining Wind
- Shirachuu Tankenbu
- Time Crisis 3

=== PlayStation 3 ===
- Bayonetta
- Time Crisis 4
- Time Crisis: Razing Storm

=== PlayStation 4 ===
- Killing Bites (cancelled)

=== PlayStation Vita ===
- Killing Bites (cancelled)

=== Sega Saturn ===
- Battle Arena Toshinden Remix
- Battle Arena Toshinden U.R.A
- Choro Q Park
- Cyber Speedway
- D-Xhird
- Linkle Liver Story
- Pro Yakyuu Greatest Nine '98
- Pro Yakyuu Greatest Nine '98 Summer Action
- Resident Evil

=== Windows ===
- Chi Q no Tomodachi
- Dark Eyes
- Dark Eyes 2000
- Dream Studio
- You will go out to the Pico-town!

=== WonderSwan Color ===
- Dark Eyes: BattleGate

=== Xbox ===
- Shin Megami Tensei: Nine
- Touge R
