= D-Xhird =

1997 fighting video game

- Developer: Nextech
- Publisher: Takara
- Platform: Sega Saturn
- Release: JP: May 30, 1997
- Genre: Fighting
- Modes: Single-player, multiplayer

D-Xhird (ディ・サード, Di・Sādo) is a 1997 3D weapons-based fighting game which was developed by Nextech and then published by Takara, the same company which created the series Battle Arena Toshinden that the game took its inspiration from. The character endings teased a sequel, although no sequel happened.

== Gameplay ==
Players choose their fighter and fight through the cast in the common fighting game fashion. Players are able to strafe using the Saturn shoulder buttons as well as performing attacks with the strafe command such as grabs and special moves. Depending on the opponent, the arena will either consist of a ring or a cage. Players (and opponents as well) have the ability to avoid falling out of the ring by pressing the jump button just as they are about to fall. Players and enemies alike can also use the walls of a caged arena to deal extra damage on an opponent by knocking them against the cage's walls.

== Characters ==
=== Initially playable characters ===
Boy

- Weapon: Cannon blade

The protagonist of the story, Boy is seeking revenge against the assassinations of his mother and lover. Although he knows that their murderers are working for a cult that is seeking him out, he is unaware that they are doing so because he holds an ancient and powerful evil spirit inside him known only as The Shadow.

Seiya

- Weapon: Flamberge

Seiya is a young hunter and rival of Boy, who has been hired to eliminate him and, consequentially, the evil force that dwells inside him.

Lucifer

- Weapon: Scythe

Sanjuroh

- Weapon: Kotetsu sword

Sabrina

- Weapon: Stun baton

Merow

- Weapon: Saber

Karen

- Weapon: Twin chakram

Karen is a schoolgirl and a close friend of Boy, who wants to help him get rid of the ancient evil that lies within him. However, she is being pursued by Kohjin, who believes she is being possessed by the ghost of Boy's deceased lover.

Kohjin

- Weapon: Tessen

Saotome

- Weapon: Twin kodachi

Soatome is an assassin, skilled in various forms of black magic, who works in the same department as Sabrina. However, he also wishes to be the leader of the underground society that seeks out Boy.

Schneider

- Weapon: Cannon staff

=== Unlockable characters ===
Venus

- Weapon: Trident

Izanagi

- Weapon: Razor gauntlets

Shadow Boy

A palette swap of Boy, depicting him as being possessed by the evil force inside him.

Eiji Shinjo

- Weapon: Byakko katana

== Reception ==
Next Generation reviewed the Saturn version of the game, rating it two stars out of five, and stated that "If Namco's Soul Edge is a Lexus, then D-Xhird is a Hyundai. Not a lot of frills, but it gets the job done. Barely."

GameSpot's Ryan Mac Donald gave D-Xhird a negative calling it "by far, the worst fighter I've ever played. He criticized multiple aspects of the game such as the sound, graphics and the gameplay itself, he said of the game's sound production "When someone gets hit, it sounds like a water bottle being dropped on the ground. Plus, nearly every second of play is plagued by the annoying sound of weapons clashing. It pains me just to think about it.". Complaints were also given of the way the game implements combo attacks and the designs of the weapons themselves. In conclusion, he wrote " How could a company release a game like D-Xhird with a clear conscience? They had to know that the game they were working on was devoid of value. Saturn owners waiting for another good 3-D fighting game can just keep on waiting. This one isn't worth the CD it's burned on. The game was given a rating of 1.4/10 and called abysmal by Mac Donald and maintains a rating of 5.5/10 from 42 user ratings on the GameSpot website as of August 2019.

In Japan, Famitsu gave it a score of 23 out of 40.
