= Choro Q HG 4 =

2003 video game

ChoroQ
- North American box art
- Developer: Barnhouse Effect
- Publishers: JP: Takara; NA: Atlus; EU: Zoo Digital Publishing
- Series: Choro Q series
- Platform: PlayStation 2
- Release: JP: November 27, 2003; NA: November 17, 2004; PAL: March 25, 2005
- Genres: Racing, Role-playing
- Modes: Single-player, multiplayer

ChoroQ (known as Choro Q HG 4 in Japan) is a PlayStation 2 game published by Atlus in the US, Zoo Digital Publishing in PAL regions and Takara in Japan. It was developed by Barnhouse Effect. The game is marketed as a "Car-PG": a hybrid of driving and role-playing video games.

== Reception ==
Reception

Aggregate score
Aggregator	Score
Metacritic	48/100

Review scores
Publication	Score
1Up.com	B−
Electronic Gaming Monthly	2/10
Famitsu	27/40
Game Informer	6.25/10
GameSpot	4/10
GameSpy	2.5/5
GameZone	6.7/10
IGN	2/10
Official U.S. PlayStation Magazine	3.5/5
X-Play	2/5

The game received "generally unfavorable reviews" according to the review aggregation website Metacritic. In Japan, Famitsu gave it a score of three sevens and one six, for a total of 27 out of 40.
