= Penny Racers (1996 video game) =

1996 video game

- PAL cover art
- Developer: Tamsoft
- Publishers: JP: Takara; PAL: Sony Computer Entertainment
- Directors: Etsuhiro Wada; Takeshi Ikenoue
- Producer: Toshiaki Ota
- Programmer: Etsuhiro Wada
- Composers: Yasuhiro Nakano, Fumio Tanabe
- Series: Choro Q
- Platform: PlayStation
- Release: JP: March 22, 1996; PAL: October 1, 1996
- Genre: Racing
- Modes: Single-player, multiplayer

Penny Racers (released as Choro Q in Japan (Note: Japanese: チョロQ)) is a 1996 racing video game developed by Tamsoft and published by Takara for the PlayStation. Sony Computer Entertainment released the game in PAL regions. The game features cars based on Takara's line of miniature Choro Q / Penny Racers toys, and was the first game based on Choro Q released outside Japan since Taito's 1984 title on MSX.

Successors were made for the PlayStation although only released only in Japan: Choro Q 2 (1997), Choro Q 3 (1998) and Choro Q Wonderful! (1999).

== Gameplay ==
Gameplay screenshot

There are two main modes: Freeplay and Grand Prix. In Grand Prix, the player progresses by winning races and using the prize money to upgrade their vehicles at the autoshop for better performance. Different tyres can be installed for the various terrains in the race tracks. There is also a split screen multiplayer mode.

== Reception ==
The game received mixed to negative reviews. Official Australian PlayStation Magazine gave it 5/10, giving criticism to the graphics and the controls for cornering. The Official UK PlayStation Magazine also rated it 5/10, calling it a "cutesy racer which lacks that elusive driving feel". PlayStation World Magazine rated it 2 out of 10. The Polish Gambler Magazine gave it 40% each for graphics and sound and 15% overall. German magazine Maniac scored it 56%, calling it not as good as Motor Toon Grand Prix 2. Meanwhile, in Japan Famitsu scored it a more positive 32 out of 40.
