= Seek and Destroy (2002 video game) =

2002 video game

- Sony PlayStation 2 European cover art
- Developer: Barnhouse Effect
- Publishers: JP: Takara; NA: Conspiracy; EU: Play It
- Series: Choro Q
- Platform: PlayStation 2
- Release: JP: June 27, 2002; NA: December 11, 2002; EU: January 24, 2003; UK: May 6, 2003
- Genre: Action
- Modes: Single player, Multiplayer

Seek and Destroy, known in Japan as Shin Combat Choro Q (新コンバットチョロQ, Shin Konbatto Choro Q), is a tank-themed vehicular combat action game for the PlayStation 2 released by Takara and licensed to Conspiracy and Play It for a global release. It is part of the Choro Q series.

== Gameplay ==
In Seek and Destroy there are over 100 tanks and there are over 100 upgrades to choose from. The game Involves upgrading and customizing your tank to progress through the game and meet the specific needs of the mission/map (including optional mini-games).

Alongside a main story mode, the game also features a Battle Arena mode where the players wins tanks that are defeated, and Expert Arena which is a series of challenge courses that test your skills at commanding your tank or a specific piece of equipment (water races and bomb survival).

== Plot ==
In the world of Quewar, three nations held power over all others: the powerful and militaristic Q-Stein Empire, the seafaring and peaceful Kingdom of Nibelia, and the economically powerful and benevolent Proton Kingdom. In August 210, the Q-Stein Empire declared war and started a campaign of world conquest. With its powerful military and effective blitz tactics, the Empire conquered surrounding nations one after another without giving them a chance to fight back. The Q-Stein Empire soon expanded its invasion to the Proton Kingdom. The military power of the Proton Kingdom wasn't as great as that of the Q-Stein Empire. However, due to their well-organized and controlled government, they were ready to respond to Q-Stein's declaration of war. In November 210, the Q-Stein Empire started their invasion of the Proton Kingdom and won a first decisive battle. To match Q-Stein military power, the Proton Kingdom organized a partisan group as a support unit for the regular army. The power of the two sides equalized, showing signs of a long war. However, in March 211, the Proton forces weakened and began to retreat south. Q-Stein troops forced the Proton King to flee the capital and go into hiding. In spite of them holding only twenty percent of their territory, the Proton troops never give up on hope.

== Characters and factions ==
There are many characters in Seek and Destroy, some of main ones are:

- Major Rodeschild — first commanding tank found. He is a M1A1 Abrams battle tank (blue with one main white stripe). He serves as the player's commanding officer for the entirety of the game. In the story he plans an invasion with the other commanders. Also, for some reason, he appears to act as if he were equal in rank to Ahmadi.
- Jevons — the second commanding tank found. He is a dark green LVTP-7 with white stripes, and leads the Proton Civilian Resistance. He is somewhat accident prone, as seen at the end of the mission "Battle of Zambneal," when he accidentally runs over an unexploded land mine.
- Lieutenant General Ahmadi — the third commanding tank found. He has the same colour scheme as Major Rodeschild, but is a Chieftain tank with a slightly bluer tint than Rodeschild. Late in the story, he and the other commanders plan an invasion on the Q-Stein Empire. He is found by the player in the next-to-last level "After the Dust Clears", killed by an enormous three-wheeled Q-Stein tank.
- Captain Boane - the fourth and final commanding tank found. He is the only named Nibelian character in the game; he is royally appointed by the King of Nibelia to command all Nibelian forces invading the Q-Stein Empire alongside the Protons. He is an Israeli Merkava III tank, and accompanies the player in all but two missions after "The Battle of Nibelia" .
- The Proton King — seen a few times throughout the game. The mission "Defend!" consists of the player defending the king's hideout from seemingly countless Q-Stein forces. The king is an M24 Chaffee tank, and is white and gold in colour, mostly white with gold stars and stripes.
- The King of Nibelia — similar to the Proton King, but is pink and blue in colour. He is a Sherman Firefly.
- The Q-Stein Emperor — the main antagonist of the game. He is the final boss that must be defeated to win the game. He has 3 Stages:
- Normal: A large pink/purple/black tank with multiple guns, which turn into legs for the spider form, as described below.
- Spider: A large pink/purple/black spider tank. which upon its destruction becomes the final stage below.
- Final: A cogwheel monster with an energy emission.

There are 3 factions in Seek and Destroy:

- The Q-Stein Empire is portrayed as the "evil" faction, and an empire with great military power. They invade a number of other nations (including Nibelia and the Proton Kingdom). The basic colour code for most of their units is black, dark purple, and a red "Q" as flag. Their force is composed primarily of German and Russian tanks; their elite units and field officers sport the Q-Stein insignia on their armour.
- The Proton Kingdom is portrayed as the "good" faction. The player is a member of this faction. The basic colour code for most of their units is white and light blue, with what is thought to be a white eagle against a light blue background. Although the Proton Kingdom's military might isn't great as the Q-stein Empire's, their government is stated to be well organized and was able to swiftly respond to the initial declaration of war presumably sparing them from the destruction wrought on the other nations. Their forces are formed mostly of American and British tanks, excluding the player's tank unless otherwise selected.
- Nibelia is an island nation that is allied with the Proton Kingdom. Nibelia was blockaded by Q-Stein forces, but the blockade was broken by liberation troops from the Proton Kingdom. Their military might isn't strong compare to Proton's and Q-stein's military, but they fight just as fiercely; they also have a small air force (curiously composed of Heinkel He 111 bombers), as seen in the mission "Flash of Explosion." Most of their tanks are of British origin, but there are a few of miscellaneous origins. For example, their military leader, Captain Boane, is an Israeli Merkava III.

== Reception ==
Reception

Aggregate score
Aggregator	Score
Metacritic	63/100

Review scores
Publication	Score
Eurogamer	4/10
Famitsu	27/40
GamesMaster	38%
GameSpot	5.6/10
IGN	6.5/10
PlayStation Official Magazine – UK	3/10
Official U.S. PlayStation Magazine	3.5/5
PSM3	69%
X-Play	3/5
Maxim	6/10

The game received "mixed" reviews according to the review aggregation website Metacritic. In Japan, Famitsu gave it a score of two sevens, one six, and one seven for a total of 27 out of 40.
