= Choro Q Park =

1998 video game

- Developer: Nextech
- Publisher: Takara
- Series: Choro Q
- Platform: Sega Saturn
- Release: JP: March 26, 1998
- Genre: Racing
- Modes: Single-player, multiplayer

Choro Q Park (Note: Japanese: チョロQパーク, Hepburn: Choro Kyū Pāku) is a 1998 racing video game developed by Nextech and published by Takara for the Sega Saturn. It is based on Takara's Choro Q line of pullback racer toys.

== Reception ==
Reception

Review scores
Publication	Score
MANiAC	45%
Sega Saturn Magazine (JP)	20/30

Two reviewers from Sega Saturn Magazine found the game fun to play, with one showing admiration towards its cute graphics and simplicity. Another found its gameplay repetitive and lacking in replay value and innovation. A MANiAC reviewer found the visuals cleaner and higher quality than the Choro Q games on PlayStation, but lamented its new additions and modes for overcomplicating the series' traditionally simple gameplay and being poorly-implemented. Superjuegos's De Lucar said its visuals wouldn't impress plays, but its simplistic gameplay and cute car designs would be appealing towards younger audiences.
