= Linkle Liver Story =

1996 video game

- Developer(s): Nextech
- Publisher(s): Sega
- Director(s): Osamu Satou
- Producer(s): Katsuji Aoyama; Tatsuo Yamada
- Designer(s): Eiichi Kitano; Yuji Tamaya
- Programmer(s): Eiki Aizawa; Manabu Takahashi; Toshio Toyota
- Artist(s): Masayuki Matsushima; Kazuhiro Nagata; Kōichirō Kobayashi
- Writer(s): Yayoi Onda
- Composer(s): Fumito Tamayama; Hidehiko Enomoto; Masato Takahashi
- Platform(s): Sega Saturn
- Release: JP: 15 March 1996
- Genre(s): Action role-playing
- Mode(s): Single-player

Linkle Liver Story (Note: Japanese: リンクルリバーストーリー, Hepburn: Rinkuru Ribā Sutōrī; lit. Wrinkle River Story) is a 1996 Japanese video game developed by Nextech and published by Sega for the Sega Saturn video game system. The game is an action-RPG where the player takes control of a fox girl named Kitsch.

== Gameplay ==
Gameplay screenshot.

Linkle Liver Story is an action adventure game which uses a top-down perspective.

Finding and planting seeds will give the player new weapons, for a total of eight possible.

The game's graphics are 2D and make extensive use of the CD-ROM format to have higher quality graphics, sound and music, as well as greater length than would be possible in cartridge format.

== Plot ==
Linkle Liver Story is set in the fairy tale world of Mamuna, which is inhabited by demi-humans. Mamuna is ruled by a figure named Muma, a user of dark magic who has ruled the planet as an authoritarian. However, his power is beginning to wane, and he may vanish if he can't find a new source of power.

Trying to prevent this, his evil forces have conquered the land of Four Seasons. Kitsch, a fox girl, joins forces with small woodland animals to fight back.

Kitsch is accompanied in her adventure by a squirrel, Balel, and a rabbit, Lalala. Her third partner, Puchimuku, is a seed that grows throughout the game.

== Development ==
The game was developed by Nextech, who had previously made the games Crusader of Centy and Ranger X for the Sega Genesis.According to Sega developer Masato Nishimura, the game was originally called Ragnacenty 2 and was therefore supposed to be the sequel to Ragnacenty / Crusader of Centy / Soleil.

== Release ==
Linkle Liver Story was released on March 15, 1996 for the Sega Saturn video game console, and was published by Sega. The game was released only in Japan. In 2019 however, the game was translated into English through a fan translation. In addition to the game, the translation team also translated the game's manual.

== Reception ==
Reception

Review scores
Publication	Score
Famitsu	26 / 40
GameFan	73 / 100
Sega Saturn Magazine (JP)	6.66 / 10

According to Famitsu, Linkle Liver Story sold over 4,950 copies in its first week on the market. Famitsu gave the game a score of 26 out of 40.

Three reviewers for GameFan gave it scores of 65, 85, and 70, of an average of 73.

Three reviewers for the Japanese Sega Saturn Magazine gave it a score of 7, 7, and 6.

Several gaming publications found the game's title to be strange. Several publications, including Next Gen, Official Sega Saturn Magazine, Mega Console, previewed the game calling it "Wrinkle River Story". GameFan reviewed the game calling it "Wrinkle River Story", however they pointed out that the game's title screen says Linkle Liver Story.
