= Weapon Shop de Omasse =

2012 video game

- Developer: Nex Entertainment
- Publisher: Level-5
- Writer: Yoshiyuki Hirai
- Series: Guild
- Platform: Nintendo 3DS
- Release: November 21, 2012 (JP); February 20, 2014 (NA)
- Genres: Role-playing video game, Rhythm game
- Mode: Single-player

Weapon Shop de Omasse (Note: Known in Japan as Omasse's Rental Weapon Shop (レンタル武器屋 de オマッセ, Rentaru Bukiya de Omasse)) is a comedy rhythm JRPG written by Yoshiyuki Hirai, in which the main characters are a father and son pair who craft weapons for heroes in a fantasy weapon shop resembling the set of a sitcom. The player uses rhythmic gameplay to forge weapons which are rented by heroes for their quests; the weapon chosen will affect whether or not the hero is successful.

The game was released as part of the Guild01 compilation on May 31, 2012 in Japan for the Nintendo 3DS, and individually on the Japanese Nintendo eShop on November 21, 2012. Although it was initially not planned for Western release, it was released on the eShop on February 20, 2014 in North America. Critical reception on the game was heavily divided; while its story was praised, its blacksmithing gameplay was not as well received by some reviewers, who called it tedious, while others found it a unique twist on the JRPG.

== Gameplay ==
The player smiths a weapon by hitting the molten metal (lower screen) while the Grindcast is visible on the upper screen.

The player takes the role of Yuhan, an apprentice blacksmith who has set out to revitalize his master's failing business. The player must craft and rent out weapons to heroes to assist them on dungeon crawls, ultimately attempting to defeat the Evil Lord who threatens the world. Weapons are created in part by using a rhythm minigame set to a musical beat; how well players can follow the beat determines the overall quality of the weapon forged. Other aspects include speaking to customers to determine the right weapon for the task.

As the game is set only in the weapon shop itself, the story outside the shop is shown only via the Grindcast, a Twitter-like magical apparatus that gives the player a real-time feed of their dialog and quests, sometimes interspersed with images, as the player crafts weapons.

== Development ==
=== Release ===
Originally, this was the only title not to be announced for Western release, with the publisher citing the high degree of translation required and debatable audience size for the game for a localization to be produced. In January 2014, a classification of the game was posted by the Australian Classification Board under the title, Weapon Shop de Omasse, suggesting that the game would receive a localization. The game was released on February 20, 2014 after the announcement during a Nintendo Direct on February 13, 2014.

== Reception ==
Reception

Aggregate score
Aggregator	Score
Metacritic	63/100

Review scores
Publication	Score
Eurogamer	4/10
Nintendo Life	9/10
RPGamer	3/5

Weapon Shop de Omasse received a 63/100 on Metacritic, indicating "mixed or average reviews".

Ron DelVillano of Nintendo Life rated the game 9/10 stars, saying that it had a niche appeal, but excellent writing, setting and presentation. Calling the gameplay unique, he commented that it put a twist on traditional RPG roles. Sam Marchello of RPGamer rated the game 3/5 points, calling the writing "brilliant" but calling the gameplay overly repetitive.

In more negative reviews, Martin Robinson of Eurogamer rated the game 4/10 points, saying that some of the jokes fell flat and that the gameplay was overly repetitive with "fuzziness" to its systems.
