= Penny Racers (1998 video game) =

- North American Nintendo 64 cover art
- Developer: Locomotive Corporation
- Publisher: THQ: JP: Takara
- Series: Choro Q series
- Platform: Nintendo 64
- Release: JP: July 17, 1998; NA: February 4, 1999; PAL: March 5, 1999
- Genre: Racing
- Modes: Single player, multiplayer

Penny Racers (Choro Q 64 in Japan (Note: Japanese: チョロQ64)) is a racing game for the Nintendo 64. It was released in Japan in 1998 and in North America and Europe in 1999. The game is part of the racing game series Choro Q based on Takara's toy line of the same name and was the first of this line to be released in North America. It had a Nintendo 64 sequel released only in Japan, Choro Q 64 2: Hachamecha Grand Prix Race. It is a customizable racer game, and has a total of 114 parts, arranged in eight categories.

== Reception ==
Reception

Aggregate score
Aggregator	Score
GameRankings	56%

Review scores
Publication	Score
CNET Gamecenter	6/10
Computer and Video Games	1/5
Electronic Gaming Monthly	6.625/10 (Note: Three critics of Electronic Gaming Monthly gave the game each a score of 6.5/10, and the other gave it 7/10.)
Famitsu	25/40
Game Informer	5.75/10
GameSpot	4.6/10
Hyper	70%
IGN	6/10
N64 Magazine	56%, 58%
Nintendo Power	6.9/10
Official Nintendo Magazine	68%
64 Magazine	79%
Arcade	1/5
Gamers' Republic	B
N64 Pro	48%, 73%

The game received "mixed" reviews according to the review aggregation website GameRankings. IGN criticized the graphics and sound. Both IGN and GameSpot said that it didn't live up to other racing games on the Nintendo 64 like Mario Kart 64 and Diddy Kong Racing. Nintendo Power found the game's menus hard to navigate. GamePro called it "a cartoony, graphical fender-bender with chunky, featureless cars and cardbord-cutout landscapes". (Note: GamePro gave the game 2/5 for graphics, 1.5/5 for sound, and two 2.5/5 scores for control and fun factor.) In Japan, Famitsu gave it a score of 25 out of 40.

== See also ==
- Penny Racers Party: Turbo Q Speedway
