= Penny Racers Party: Turbo Q Speedway =

2008 video game

- North American cover art
- Developer: Barnhouse Effect
- Publishers: JP: Takara Tomy; NA: Tomy
- Series: Choro Q
- Platform: Wii
- Release: JP: February 28, 2008; NA: October 7, 2008
- Genre: Racing
- Modes: Single-player, multiplayer

Penny Racers Party: Turbo Q Speedway (チョロQ Wii, ChoroQ Wii) is a 2008 racing video game developed by Barnhouse Effect and published by Takara Tomy for the Wii. It is part of the Choro Q video game series, which is based on Takara's toy line of the same name.

== Gameplay ==
The game is a racing game that's formed into "circuits", each one consisting of several races and minigames. Completing them earns the player bronze, silver, or gold trophies which can be exchanged into currency called "Q-coins". The coins can be spent on the in-game store to buy upgrades to the car. As the player progresses through the game, new parts for the car will be unlocked. The multiplayer mode (up to four players) is done in split screen. The game supports the Wii Wheel accessory. Cars are licensed from manufacturers like Honda, Nissan, and Toyota.

== Reception ==
Reception

Review scores
Publication	Score
GameZone	3.0/10
Nintendo World Report	6/10
Wired	2/10

Nintendo World Report noted the graphics as unimpressive, the music as uninspired, and the sound effects as grating. The controls were called "unresponsive" at first but the experience was said to be greatly improved once the car can be upgraded later in the game. The game was summarized as "a mildly entertaining racer".

Wired called the controls "unsophisticated". The graphics and physics were equated to the Penny Racers game on the Nintendo 64.

GameZone said the graphics look "poor" and that they resemble the Nintendo 64 game. Controls were described as "simplistic and unresponsive". The game was considered to be "miserable time if you are over 13 years of age".
