= Arabian Nights: Sabaku no Seirei-ō =

1996 video game

- Developer(s): Pandora Box
- Publisher(s): Takara
- Producer(s): Takayuki Nakano
- Designer(s): Toshinori Kawakami
- Writer(s): Natsuko Hayakawa
- Composer(s): Takashi Horiguchi; Ichiro Nemoto; Daisuke Tamura
- Platform(s): Super Famicom
- Release: JP: June 14, 1996
- Genre(s): Role-playing game
- Mode(s): Single-player

Arabian Nights: Sabaku no Seirei-ō (アラビアンナイト 〜砂漠の精霊王〜; lit. "Arabian Nights: Spirit King of the Desert") is a 1996 role-playing video game developed by Pandora Box and published by Takara for the Super Famicom.

== Gameplay ==
Arabian Nights is an adventure game in the Arabian world. Other than collecting crystals that sealed the power of the King of Spirits, the player may move freely. Additionally, the player's decisions may lead to multiple scenarios or multiple endings.

=== Barrier Cards ===
This game follows an orthodox style of turn-based gameplay. However, a unique characteristic is that Barrier Cards allow special effects on combatants, whether friend or foe.

Barrier Cards may be activated at the beginning of each battle turn, and the effect lasts three turns. The player may hold a maximum of 16 cards at one time. When the player uses a card, they will receive a new one at the end of every battle. The cards have 9 different attributes and range between 5 levels. The higher the value, the greater the barrier activation power. In the event of multiple cards drawn, only the card with the greater barrier activation power will have an effect. However, the card with the lower level will have a stronger effect.

Additionally, each affinity has a special level 0 card, which can only be obtained in a special way. Level 0 has the strongest effect but only during the activating turn. In the next turn, the card has the lowest effect, so the card can be called a “plot twist card.”

Although the barrier effects attack the corresponding affinity, extremes such as “Double Magic Attack,” “Absolute Critical,” and “Nullify Physical Attack” exist depending on the level. Since weak enemies may also use strong cards, there can be difficult battles. For that reason, having strategies likes breaking an enemy's barrier with high level cards or deliberately keeping cards for future danger is required.

=== Journal ===
Shukran carries a journal which acts as a guide with a high level of freedom. Since events are added to the journal as they occur, blank spaces indicate incomplete actions. Additionally, it can be used to determine the next objective by reviewing past events.

== Plot ==
The King of Djinns Ifrit is defeated by a man named Suleiman and made his servant. Then some anonymous magical being destroys Suleiman's house and weakens Ifrit. To grant Ifrit freedom, Suleiman seals him in a Contract Ring and shall be free after a thousand wishes have been granted by a thousand hands.

One century later, in the town of Bazaar, an orphan girl named Shukran finds the Contract Ring and unleashes Ifrit. With 999 wishes used throughout last the century, Shukran uses the last wish for peace in her homeland. Ifrit however cannot stray far from his ring, so Shukran and Ifrit travel the land together to make this possible.

== Reception ==
Famitsu gave it a score of 26 out of 40.
