= Lost Word of Jenny =

1987 video game

- Cover art
- Developer: Tose
- Publisher: Takara
- Platform: Family Computer
- Release: JP: March 25, 1987
- Genre: 2D action platformer
- Mode: Single-player

Lost Word of Jenny (Japanese: ロストワード・オブ・ジェニー, Hepburn: Rosuto Wādo obu Jenī), styled on-screen as Lost Word of JeNnY, is a map-based action video game for the Family Computer which was released in 1987. The game is a licensed tie-in to the Takara doll, Jenny.

== Summary ==
=== Gameplay information ===
In the actual stages of the game, it reverts to a side scrolling view. The map mode is similar to the map mode in the Teenage Mutant Ninja Turtles video game. The game was released on March 25, 1987 and gives the player three lives to solve their quest.

=== Characters ===
Jenny
She is the protagonist based on a then-popular doll in Japan.
Blackie
He is a killer.
Chu
A rat with a lovely face but a bad character.
God of Death Skeleton
He is the messenger from Hell.
Pumpkin Man
The man is wearing a pumpkin on his head.
Frogman
He is the frog from the Flower Land.
Bibi Order
They are dressed in KKK-style clothes. A collection of the world's most powerful evil.
