= BowLingual =

Computer-based dog-to-human language translation device

BowLingual (バウリンガル), or "Bow-Lingual" as the North American version is spelled, is a computer-based dog language-to-human language translation device developed by Japanese toy company Takara and first sold in Japan in 2002. Versions for South Korea and the United States were launched in 2003. The device was named by Time magazine as one of the "Best Inventions of 2002." The inventors of BowLingual, Keita Satoh, Matsumi Suzuki and Norio Kogure were awarded the 2002 Ig Nobel Prize for "promoting peace and harmony between the species."

The device is presented as a "translator" but has been called an "emotion analyzer". It is said to categorize dog barks into one of six standardized emotional categories. BowLingual also provides a phrase which is representative of that emotion. The product instructions state that these phrases "are for entertainment purposes only" and are not meant to be accurate translations of each bark.

== Features ==
BowLingual has bow functions which include dog training tips, a "Bow Wow Diary," tips on understanding a dog's body language, a medical checklist and a home alone bark recording function. The device consists of a hand-held receiver that contains a LCD information screen and functions as the controller and a wireless microphone-transmitter which is attached to the dog's collar.

When a dog barks, the microphone records and transmits the sound to the hand-held unit for computer analysis by a database with thousands of dog barks pre-recorded into it. The unit then categorizes the bark into one of six distinct dog emotions (happy, sad, frustrated, on-guard, assertive, needy) and displays the corresponding emotion on the screen. After displaying the emotion, BowLingual then displays a phrase which has been categorized to fit within the range of each emotion.

== Versions ==
Regional versionals of BowLingual have been released in Japan, South Korea, the US and Canada. The versions for South Korea, the US and Canada have different modifications in comparison to the Japanese version. In May 2003, at the request of the Japan Foreign Ministry, Takara provided Japanese Prime Minister Junichiro Koizumi with two prototypes of the English version of BowLingual several months before it had been released in North America. Koizumi then presented these to Russian President Vladimir Putin, for each of his dogs (Tosca, a standard Poodle, and Connie, a Labrador Retriever), at ceremonies celebrating the 300th anniversary of St. Petersburg.

== Effectiveness ==
BowLingual uses customized voice-print analysis technology which has been adapted for dog barks. The accuracy of this product can be affected by varying conditions and situations. Sound interference can occur when the wireless collar-microphone picks up noises made by chain collars and collars with dog tags attached. As a result, the dog owner may believe that the device is malfunctioning and not registering the dog bark correctly.

In windy conditions, the microphone will sometimes interpret a gust of wind as a bark. Electrical equipment and certain radio signals may trigger false readouts. Due to improvements with the US and Canadian versions of the products, these problems are more common with the Japanese and South Korean versions.

One reviewer of the product, veterinarian Sophia Yin, stated, "it's not very useful because the translations aren't trustworthy and most don't make sense."

Csaba Molnar and colleagues at Eotvos Lorand University, Budapest, Hungary, proved by computer-based machine learning algorithms that there are consistent differences in the acoustics of dog barks according to the behavioural context and individuals.

== Related products ==
In 2003 Takara launched a follow-up product for cats called Meowlingual (ミャウリンガル). It functioned similarly to BowLingual; however, it did not use the wireless microphone system. Instead, the microphone was contained in the main hand-held unit so that the user had to be close enough to, in effect, "interview" the cat. Without the wireless component, Meowlingual was considerably cheaper than BowLingual. Meowlingual was never launched in the U.S. or any other countries, so only Japanese language versions exist. The iPhone version of BowLingual similarly listens to the dog through the iPhone's microphone.

== See also ==
- Human-animal communication
