= Ranger X =

1993 video game

- Developer: GAU Entertainment
- Publisher: Sega
- Producer: Isao Mizoguchi
- Designer: Toshio Yamamoto
- Programmer: Toshio Toyota
- Artist: Ree Senfhu
- Composer: Yoshinobu Hiraiwa
- Platform: Mega Drive/Genesis
- Release: JP: 28 May 1993; EU: August 1993; NA: October 1993
- Genre: Run and gun
- Mode: Single-player

Ranger X (Note: Also known as Ex-Ranza (Japanese: エクスランザー, Hepburn: Ekusu-Ranzā) in Japan.) is a side-scrolling run and gun video game developed for the Genesis by GAU Entertainment and published by Sega in 1993.

== Gameplay ==
Gameplay screenshot

The player assumes the role of Ranger X, piloting a powered exoskeleton who leads the fight back for his home planet against the invading Rahuna forces. Ranger X is equipped with a jet pack and an assortment of weapons. The jet pack allows for short periods of flight, the duration of which is limited by the jet pack's temperature. Upon overheating, the player must land and wait for cool down. Alongside Ranger X's standard pulse rifle, the player has access to various special weapons including a flamethrower and homing attacks. Unlike the pulse rifle, the special weapons drain a power bar, which can only be recharged when Ranger X is in a bright light source. This special arsenal can be increased by collecting power ups scattered across the levels. On certain levels, the player may also control a supporting vehicle – an Ex-Up, such as Indra – a futuristic motorcycle, a premise described as "RoboCop on a Harley". Indra can move and fire independently of Ranger X, although Ranger X can enter it to take advantage of its separate shielding.

The game is split across several levels, each of which is introduced via a wire frame 3D cutscene detailing a specific target objective. The player must battle through enemy forces and destroy all target objectives, followed by the stage boss, in order to progress.

== Development and release ==
Ranger X was first project to be developed by GAU Entertainment (now Nex Entertainment), a Japanese video game developer founded by former Wolf Team staff, with both Toshio Toyota and Toshio Yamamoto serving as designers, with artist Ree Senfhu co-creating the pixel art, in addition of Yoshinobu Hiraiwa acting as composer and Noriyuki Iwadare creating the sound effects. The team recounted the project's development process and history through various Japanese publications.

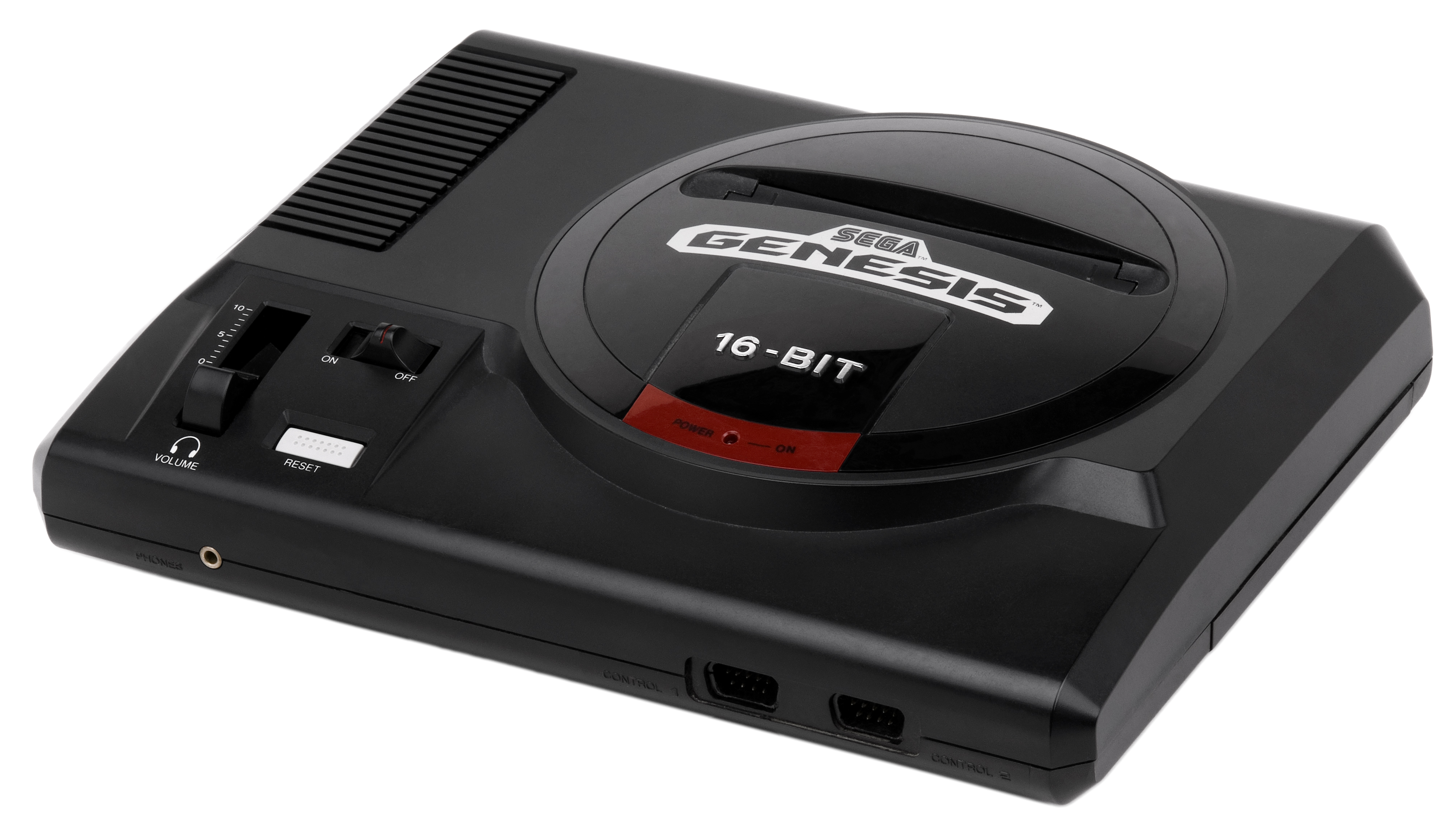
Ranger X was the first project to be developed by GAU Entertainment for the Sega Mega Drive.

Yamamoto claimed that the team created Ranger X with a lot of intuition without copying other titles, not wanting to be bounded with the need to imitate others, as their goal was to make a Sega Mega Drive game of high-quality. However, Yamamoto commented that the team did not think about the graphics but due to the emphasis on creating a polished game, the visuals ultimately had "a lot of shine too". Yamamoto remarked that the team did not use game design documents, as the team added elements on the fly when memory space was available. Both Toyota and Yamamoto wanted the animations to feel intricate, as robots have more possibilities and the team worked to make as much animations as possible for sprites.

Toyota had thought about creating a side-scrolling robot action game on Sega Genesis for a time, not using any example as he dislikes imitating others while also stating that the team started with a question regarding what makes a game fun, with Ranger X being the final result. Toyota stated GAU created custom software tools that allowed the team with pushing the hardware capabilities of the Mega Drive to its limits. Toyota also stated that working with the Sega Mega Drive was easy to develop for despite various issues, claiming that increasing the number of colors on-display was easy through hardware tricks while remarking that the Mega Drive's problem with colors "isn't so much a numerical/quantitative problem, as it is a question of subtlety on the designer's part."

As Ranger X is an action-shooter game, Hiraiwa wanted exciting and lively sounds as a basis but he went towards a darker tone for compositions, leaning towards surrealism and energetic, which matched his personal view of the title. Hiraiwa stated that the choice of colors reflects the music's tone, which lead him to write 23 songs with a rock and progressive rock touch as he did not want music feel similar to each other. Iwadare spent time creating unique sound effects not heard in other games at the time while making patches with tonal variety for the guitar sound, stating that sound effects are "more on par with the music in terms of importance." Ranger X was first published by Sega in Japan on May 28, 1993, then in Europe in August 1993 and later in North America on October of the same year.

== Reception ==
Reception

Review scores
| Publication | Score |
|---|---|
| Computer and Video Games | 93/100 |
| Electronic Gaming Monthly | 31/40 |
| Famitsu | 68/100 |
| GamePro | 16/20 |
| GamesMaster | 82% |
| Mean Machines Sega | 92/100 |
| Mega | 81% |
| MegaTech | 94% |
| Sega Force Mega | 85/100 |

Critical reception was generally positive. Mega praised the tactical opportunities offered by the different weaponry, and the need to manage the supporting vehicle. Similar sentiments were echoed in Sega Force Mega and GamePro, who felt that "the unique dual action of flying and riding a motorcycle gives this game a step up against over other shooters".

The graphics impressed, with some reviews claiming that Ranger X had broken through the Mega Drive hardware's color limitations. Almost every aspect of the graphics were praised, from the detail of the backgrounds, to the clarity of the sprites, and even the presentation of the cutscenes. EGM felt that Ranger X featured "some of the best graphics ever seen on the [Mega Drive]". MegaTech however, noticed that the game exhibited "a bit of sprite flicker when things get busy".

Not all criticism was positive, while some felt the difficulty was just right, and welcome in an age of "too-easy games", others felt that it could be too difficult for novices. Some reviewers at EGM also found the controls lacking, making effective movement difficult and frustrating. Still, the game received recommendations from the majority of critics, with Mega concluding that "it's so chocka full of imagination, that you'll be left wondering why other shoot 'em ups are so repetitive".
