= Choro-Q =

Japanese toy line released in the US as Penny Racers

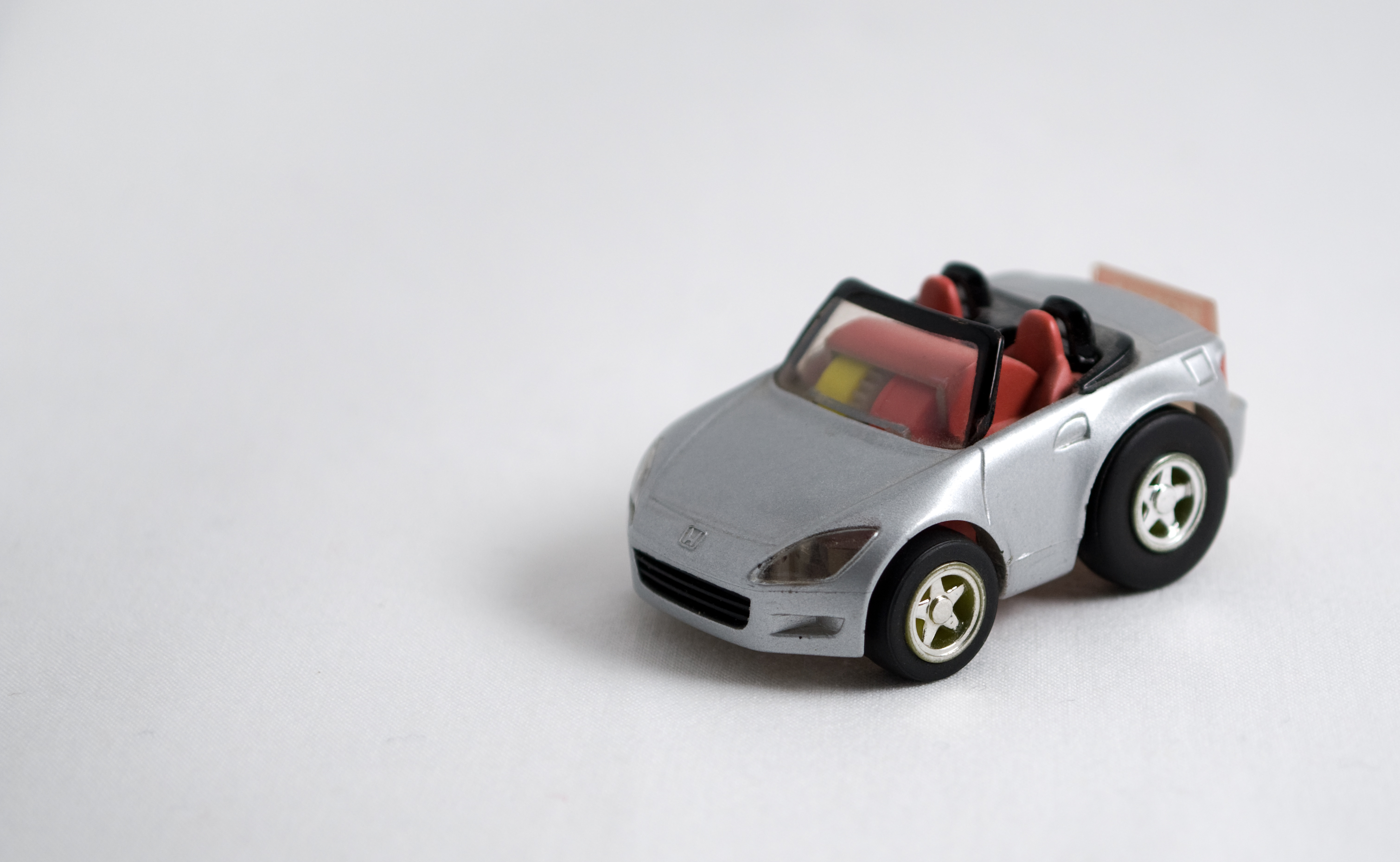
- A Choro-Q Honda S2000 licensed car
- Other names: Penny Racers
- Type: Pullback car
- Company: Takara Tomy
- Country: Japan
- Availability: 1978–present
- Official website

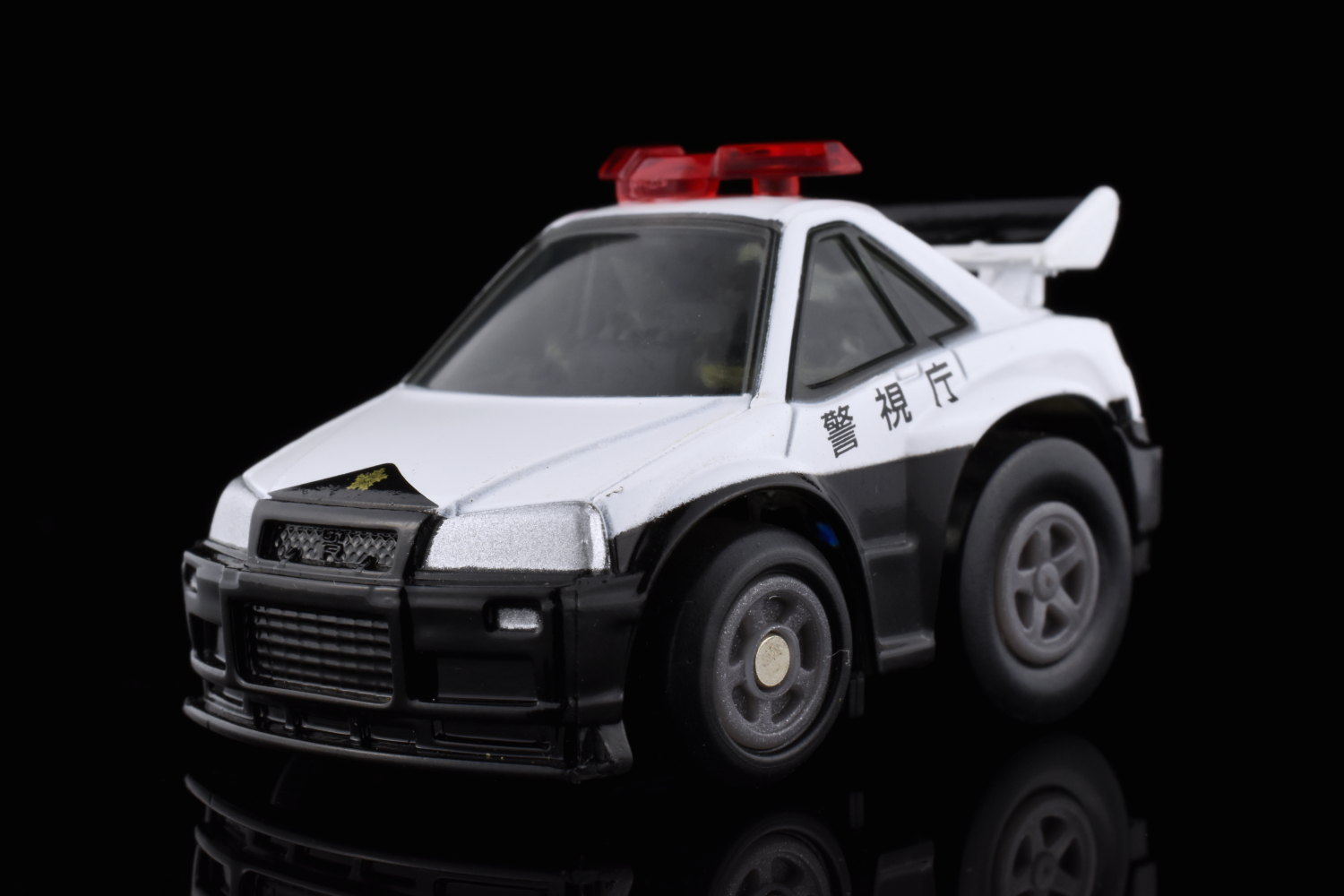
Q-Steer based on a Nissan R34 Skyline

Choro-Q (Note: Japanese: チョロQ, Hepburn: Choro Kyū) is a line of Japanese 3–4 cm pullback car toys produced by Takara Tomy (formerly Takara). Known in North America as Penny Racers and earlier in the '80s as Turbo Tricksters, they were introduced in late 1978 and have seen multiple revisions and successors since. The name comes from the Japanese term choro-choro, meaning "dash around", as well as an abbreviation of the Japanese borrowing from "cute" (kyūto) to connote their petite size.

Takara created the Choro-Q line after noticing the popularity of miniature car toys in Japan. Choro-Qs are stylized after real-world automobiles, with real rubber wheels and a pullback motor that makes them move. Each car has a coin slot at the back, where inserting a penny will make it perform a wheelie when the car is released. A wide variety of car models was chosen to make the Choro-Q series appeal to everybody, ranging from sports cars to formula racers.

== Features ==
Most Choro-Q feature real rubber tires (usually with larger ones on the rear) and the characteristic coil-spring pullback motor. Also, each Choro-Q is a "cute" squeezed design caricature of the actual vehicle it represents. This type of caricature is also known as "deformed scale" as it gives the car a foreshortened or deformed appearance. What is also distinct about the cars is the slot at the rear, where a small coin can be inserted for the wheelie effect.

The toy line is highly popular and has become collectible, even outside Japan, due to its low price and its merchandising line which includes JGTC and various licensed car editions and has also spawned a series of videogames bearing the same name. The toy line has also lent its moulding to the Micro-Change and Transformers line of toys.

In addition to "Penny Racers", Choro-Q pullback cars were also marketed under the Tonka branding in the late 1980s as "Tonka Turbo Tricksters". "Penny Racers" in the US are still marketed by Funrise, but are less popular for collectors compared with their true-to-life counterparts marketed elsewhere, and versus the ones formerly sold by Tonka. "Penny Racers" tend to be garishly colored and given silly names, ignoring the actual names of the makes and models, and marketed for US children, whereas the Choro Q in the far East are made to a much higher quality standard and many are specifically designed for the adult collector, with high detail and/or tiny, incredibly detailed racing graphics and occasionally other realistic gimmicks such as fold-out headlights.

Originally produced in Japan, the manufacture subsequently has occurred variously in Taiwan, Macau and China. The models represent various makes and models of all kinds of actual cars, trucks, trains, and even planes and military and construction vehicles. There are even versions representing just about every bus and train line in Japan. Choro-Q are also produced in limited special runs for promotional purposes. Models are licensed and produced for automotive manufacturers and dealers, or as tchotchkes for marketing of other products and services. They even released a Major League Baseball line.

The first Choro-Q cars were more geared toward children, with primary colors and low detail. They have grown more sophisticated over time and now are for the most part cast in a uniform clear, colored or smoked resin plastic which is then painted, thus leaving the windshields and headlights, etc. transparent for added realism. From early on, Takara offered accessories and various spare parts and modification parts, including different motors to give a higher speed. Recently the newer Choro-Q are sold from the factory with various styles of spring-wound motors, including slow (for trucks and machinery), normal (for normal cars), and fast (for sports cars). There is even a 2-speed motor that starts out slow and then shifts to a higher gear.

== History ==
The Choro-Q toy line was produced by Takara, a Japanese toy manufacturer best known for producing Transformers and B-Daman. Noticing an increase in popularity of miniature car toys across the country, Takara began work on a similar toy line to capitalize on their success. The Choro-Q cars were given small, pullback motors that launched them when released; few car lines had such a feature, which Takara felt would make them stand out among similar lines and give them their own unique finish.

The miniature, super-deformed style of the cars is believed to be based on artwork by cartoonist Dave Deal, who in the late 1970s had supplied his art style to a line of cartoonish-looking stunt racer toys called "Glitter Bugs". The Choro-Q line is also based on an earlier Takara product called "Mame Dash", which had only lasted a few years before being discontinued in 1980.

To make the toys appeal to a wide audience, Takara chose to make several varieties of models, ranging from formula racers, to buggies, to stunt cars, to sports cars. The idea for the coin-operated wheelie function came from an employee suggesting the cars could bend in other directions, rather than simply moving forward when pulled back. The name "Choro-Q" comes from the Japanese term "choro-choro", meaning "dash around", as well as an abbreviation of the Japanese word for "cute", which connotes their petite size.

== Specialty models ==
Unusual Choro-Q which have the wheels and pull-back motor but are not modelled after vehicles are also common, often sold as special collectibles. This includes Choro-Q in the shape of common regional symbols such as carved wood bears of Hokkaido and popular symbols from other regions such monkeys, salmon eggs, sea urchin, etc. sold only in certain regions and marketed at local domestic tourists.

In 2013, following the example of the Tomica line with its Limited Vintage models, Takara Tomy unveiled Choro-Q Zero, a premium series of classical Japanese cars aimed at the collectors market.

The Choro-Q brand has been extended, often with a small name change which is a pun on the original name, to cover other small toys or novelties, both with and without the wheels and motor, including

- Digi-Q: Electronic remote control versions of Choro-Q cars which used infrared technology instead of radio control. These products were developed in conjunction with Konami.
- Choco-Q: Chocolate egg with a small capsule toy inside
- Puka-Q: Bath salts compressed into an egg shape, which, when dissolved in the bath, reveals a small toy inside
- Choro-Juu: ("Ju" [獣], meaning beast or monster, from 怪獣) Small monster toys which moved with a friction motor and had other gimmicks such as sparks shooting from the mouth.
- Choro-Chuu ("Chu" [虫], insect or bug, from 昆虫): Realistic plastic and rubber figures of various beetles, with wheels and a pull-back motor for movement.
- Jumbo Choro-Q: This is a large-scale version of the small toys but approximately 30 cm in length. They have the same pull-back motor gimmick and the hood also opened to reveal a storage space for standard sized Choro-Q toys.
- Q-steer: A more inexpensive infra-red remote control version of Choro-Q cars than the earlier Digi-Q, this line was first released in 2006 after the merger with TOMY and for several years became one of the best selling toy lines in Japan. They come in Normal, Tamiya Dune Buggies, Mario Kart Wii and Doraemon versions.
- CQ Motors: The most ambitious brand extension of all, this wholly owned subsidiary of Takara, founded in 2002, manufactured and sold actual single-passenger, electric automobiles modelled after the toy cars. The cars are street-legal (though not permitted on highways), require a standard driver's license for operation and have a top speed of about 50 km/h and a range of about 80 km on a single charge. Several models were sold, including one designed by famed manga artist Akira Toriyama, priced in the 1-1.9 million yen range. Although sales have been discontinued, as many as 500 were sold in all. In a country known for the prowess of its automobile industry it is remarkable that at one point, Takara, a toy company, had the highest share of electric cars on the road in Japan.
- Choro-Q Deck System (CDS): A system of special customizable Choro-Q cars and track designed for head-on crash "battle" competitions. The innovative "deck system" allows the easy swapping of the principle car components by putting each component in a card-like frame. Swappable components include the chassis-engine, front-end battering ram, outer body and special deflecting side wings. After stacking a unique combination of component cards like a deck of cards, a unique vehicle comes together which can be easily detached from the deck and put into battle on the track. The object of the competition is to design a vehicle which will knock the opponent off the track in a head-to-head crash battle.
- Choro-Q Hybrid: A newer version of the Digi-Q and Q-Steer, the Choro-Q Hybrid is available in two chassis types, Remote Type and Spring Type. The car bodies can be removed easily with a screwdriver so they can be swapped onto other chassis types or traded. They also include additional pieces that are fitted to the tyres or underside to perform special tricks, and slot car tracks to race on. The speed of the Remote Type's Dash button has vastly increased, and the Mario Kart Wii cars come with an Item Randomiser on the remote. The remote sizes have increased and the cars are charged via remote.

== Video games ==
Dozens of video games using the Choro-Q brand and themes have been released. These games, which have been released on many platforms, are racing genre with varying customization and RPG elements. Many of the games have been ported and translated with moderate success internationally, sometimes under the Choro-Q name, but also under other names such as Penny Racers, Gadget Racers and Road Trip.

== Motorsports ==
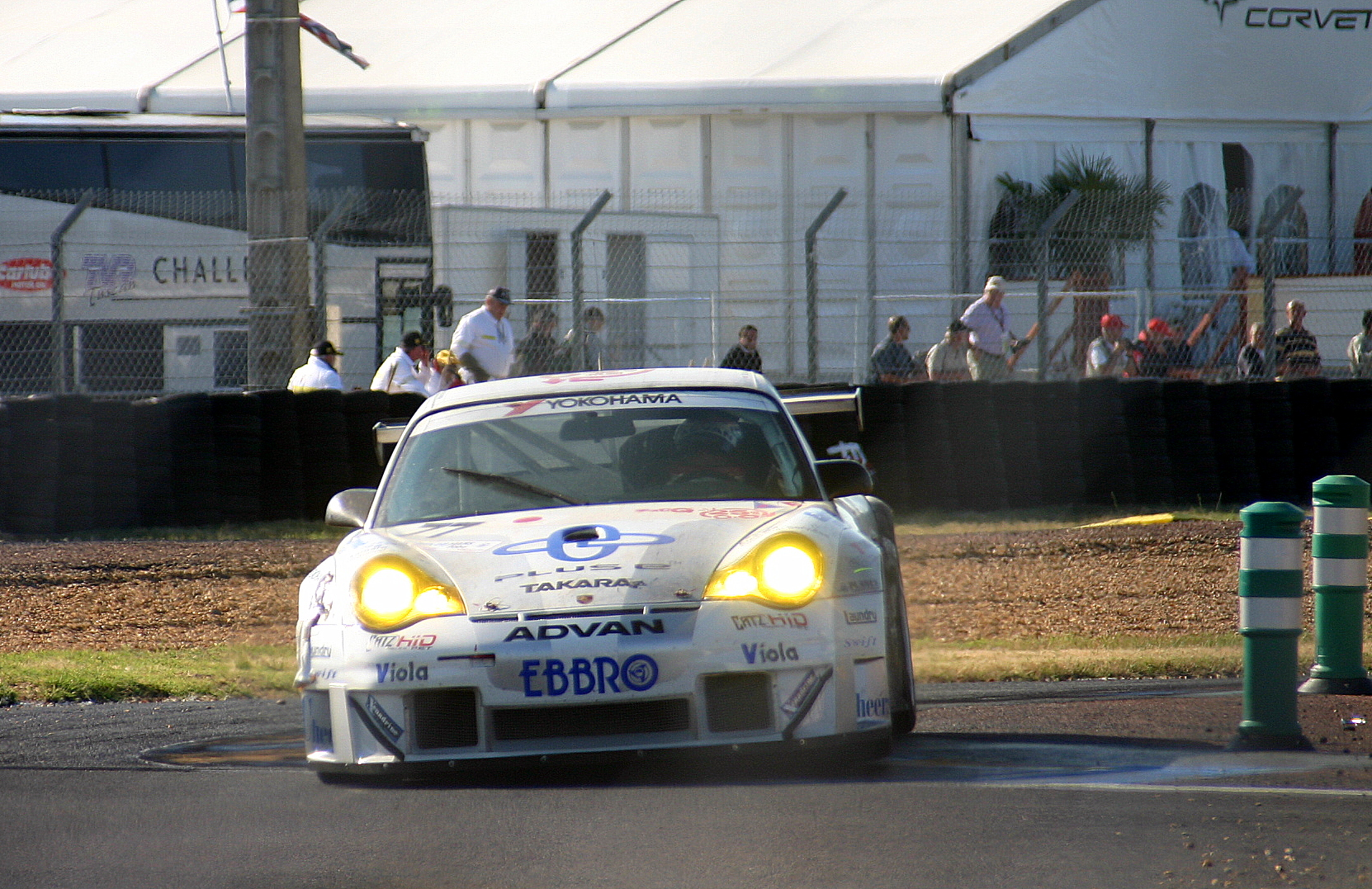
Choro-Q Racing Porsche 911 GT3 RSR at the 2004 24 Hours of Le Mans

The Choro-Q brand briefly sponsored a motorsports team, the Choro-Q Racing Team, in endurance racing in 2004.

The team entered the 2004 24 Hours of Le Mans driving a Porsche 911 GT3 RSR (996), driven by Manabu Orido, Kazuyuki Nishizawa, and Haruki Kurosawa. Choro-Q Racing finished 2nd place in the GT class and 12th place overall.

Orido, Nishizawa, and Kurosawa also raced for the team in the Le Mans Endurance Series. In the 2004 series, Choro-Q Racing finished in 5th place for the GT class.
