= Takara =

Japanese toy company

Takara Co., Ltd.
- Final logo, used from 1984 to 2006

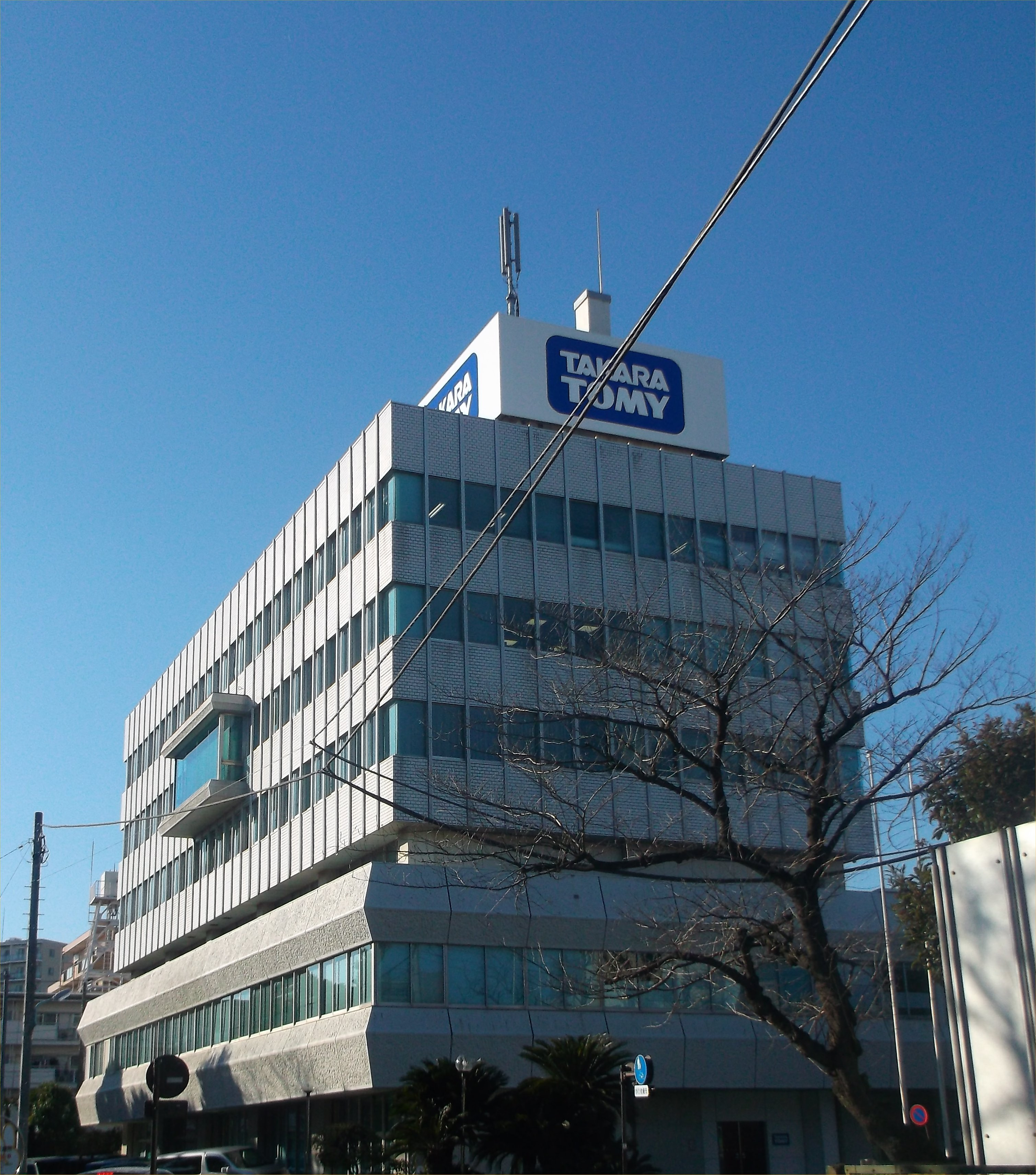
- Former headquarters in Katsushika, Tokyo
- Native name: 株式会社タカラ
- Romanized name: Kabushiki gaisha Takara
- Industry: Entertainment
- Founded: 1955; 71 years ago
- Defunct: March 1, 2006; 20 years ago
- Fate: Merged with Tomy to form Takara Tomy
- Successor: Takara Tomy
- Headquarters: Aoto, Katsushika, Tokyo, Japan
- Products: Toys, action figures, model vehicles
- Brands: Battle Beasts; B-Daman; Beyblade; BowLingual; Choro-Q; Microman; Transformers (inside Japan)
- Owner: Index Corporation (34.5%)
- Subsidiaries: Tatsunoko Production; Atlus (majority stake, 2003–2006)

Takara Co., Ltd. (株式会社タカラ, Kabushiki gaisha Takara) was a Japanese toy company founded in 1955. In March 2006, the company merged with Tomy Company, Ltd. to form Takara Tomy. The Takara motto was「遊びは文化」("playing is culture").

The company focused on traditional toys and board games. They created the Licca-chan dolls, which has been referred to as "Japan's Barbie" in Western press. Some of the globally known toys and franchises that Takara invented include Transformers and Beyblade. Takara also held the license to localise and distribute Hasbro products in Japan including The Game of Life, Blythe dolls, Magic: The Gathering, Duel Masters trading card games. Takara was also involved in software, publishing video games based on its toys like Transformers and Choro Q / Penny Racers, porting SNK Neo Geo games to consoles, and the Battle Arena Toshinden series.

== History ==
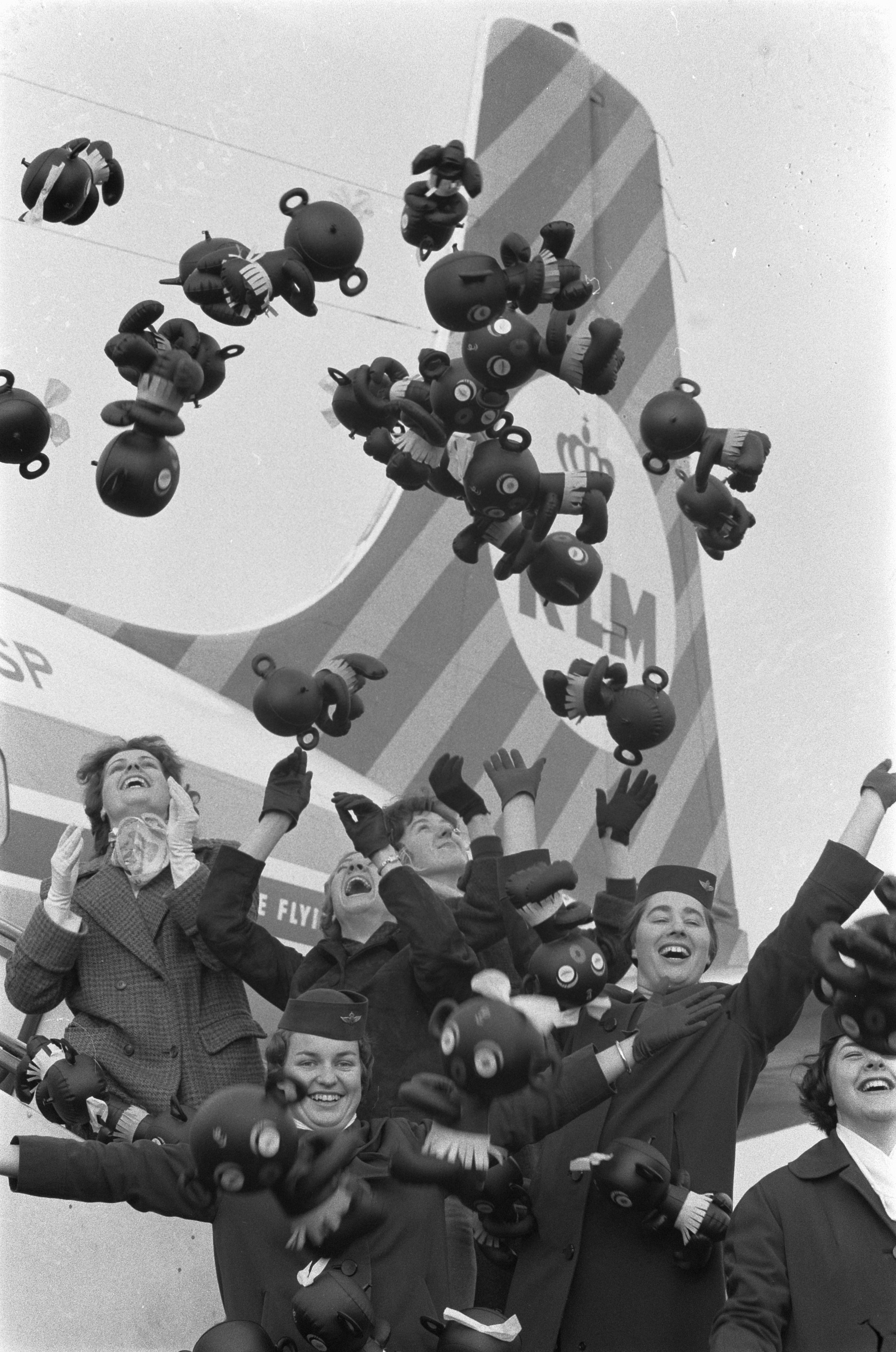
KLM Royal Dutch Airlines staff with inflatable Winky Dolls in 1960

Founded in 1955 by Yasuta Sato, the company adopted the name Takara in 1960. The company was listed on the Tokyo Stock Exchange in 1984.

Despite the big success of Beyblade in 1999, Takara was struggling financially. In July 2000, Konami bought a 22.2% controlling stake in the company.

In 2003, Takara purchased Atlus and transferred all its video gaming properties to it. Konami sold its share to Index Corporation in April 2005 and Takara became a subsidiary of Index.

On 13 May 2005, Takara and Tomy announced their merger, with Tomy being the surviving company. It became effective on 1 March 2006. In English, the official name of the merged company is "TOMY Co. Ltd." while in Japan the legal company name is "K. K. Takara-Tomy" (株式会社タカラトミー; TYO: 7867). In deciding upon the merged company's new name, "Takara" was used for its international brand recognition and "Tomy" was used because it was a trusted brand of infant and preschool products in Japan. While Japanese commercial law allows wide latitude in translating Japanese corporate names into official English names, the merged company took the unusual step of adopting "TOMY Company, Ltd." as its official English, while using "K.K. Takara-Tomy" in Japan.

== Products ==
=== Toys ===
In 1960, Takara released the Dakko-Chan (ダッコちゃん) doll which would become a hit in Japan's during that era. The nickname was given because of how it "embraces" a person. Also referred to as Winky Dolls in English, in the 1980s the company was criticized overseas for using it as a mascot due to its golliwog-like character and racial undertones. By the end of production in 1988, six million of these dolls were sold.

In 1967, Takara produced the first generation of the Licca-chan doll, which would become very popular in Japan to this day, and which was 21 centimeters tall and had the last name of Kayama, inspired by the musician Yuzo Kayama and actress Yoshiko Kayama. They released the Jenny doll in the 1980s.

In 1975, Takara produced the Diaclone and Microman Micro Change toys. In 1984, the toy line was rebranded by Hasbro as "Transformers". Takara continued to sell Microman and used it as the basis for the Micronauts toy line. Micronauts were sold internationally by the Mego Corporation. Other transforming toys made by Takara include Brave, Dennō Bōkenki Webdiver, and Daigunder. Both Webdiver and Daigunder toys could interact with TV screens, which proved only but a fad in the early 2000s.

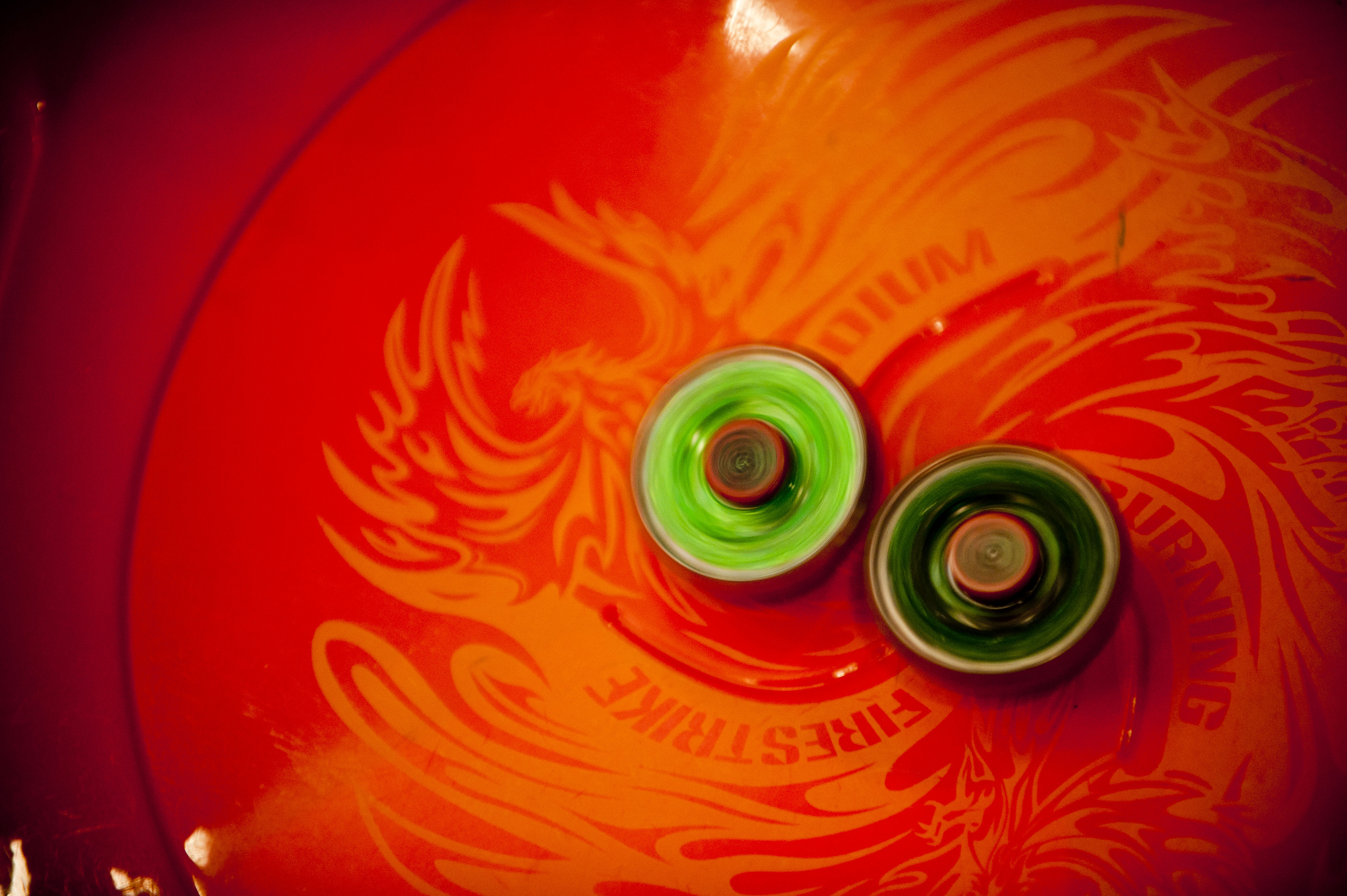
Two Beyblades in a 'Beyblade tournament'

In 1978, Takara developed the Choro-Q, mini pullback cars. Internationally, they have been sold as "Penny Racers". Takara also invented the action figure line Battle Beasts, the E-kara karaoke microphone, B-Daman, and Beyblade, a product that has achieved high popularity globally. These toys were sold or distributed internationally by Hasbro.

The Dakko-Chan doll was revived in 2001 in a new colorful form. This one had enough features to connote the original product, but divested the traits which brought criticism (for example, the new doll was not always coloured black).

=== Software ===
Takara developed and published video games, the first being Transformers: Mystery of Convoy based on their own Transformers toys. They also licensed their other properties into video games for example the Famicom title Lost Word of Jenny based on their Jenny doll, and Choro Q games. Other games published by Takara include Banana Prince and Arabian Nights: Sabaku no Seirei-ō.

In the 1990s and early 2000s, Takara published video games for franchises and manga such as Chibi Maruko-chan, Armored Trooper Votoms, Duel Masters and Tokyo Mew Mew. The company ported (adapted) some of the SNK Neo Geo based arcade games including the Fatal Fury and the Samurai Shodown series for the 8 and 16-bit consoles, Sega Genesis, the Super Nintendo Entertainment System, or the Famicom.

Takara with its contract developer Tamsoft also produced the influential 3D fighting series Battle Arena Toshinden, and other original games such as SteamGear Mash. Takara from 1994–1998 also brought many SNK fighters to the Game Boy in the form of simplified "demakes" called Nettou, starting with Fatal Fury 2.

DreamMix TV World Fighters was released in 2003 as a crossover between Takara, Hudson Soft and Konami. From 2003 Takara also owned the video game developer and publisher Atlus. Some Takara properties were licensed to and published by Atlus. In 2006, after the merger with Tomy, Takara's former controlling stake in Atlus was sold to Index Holdings, Takara Tomy's major shareholder. Takara-branded product licenses were returned to Takara Tomy's consumer software division; the merged company thereafter also produced the games in the Zoids and Naruto series.

=== Life entertainment products ===
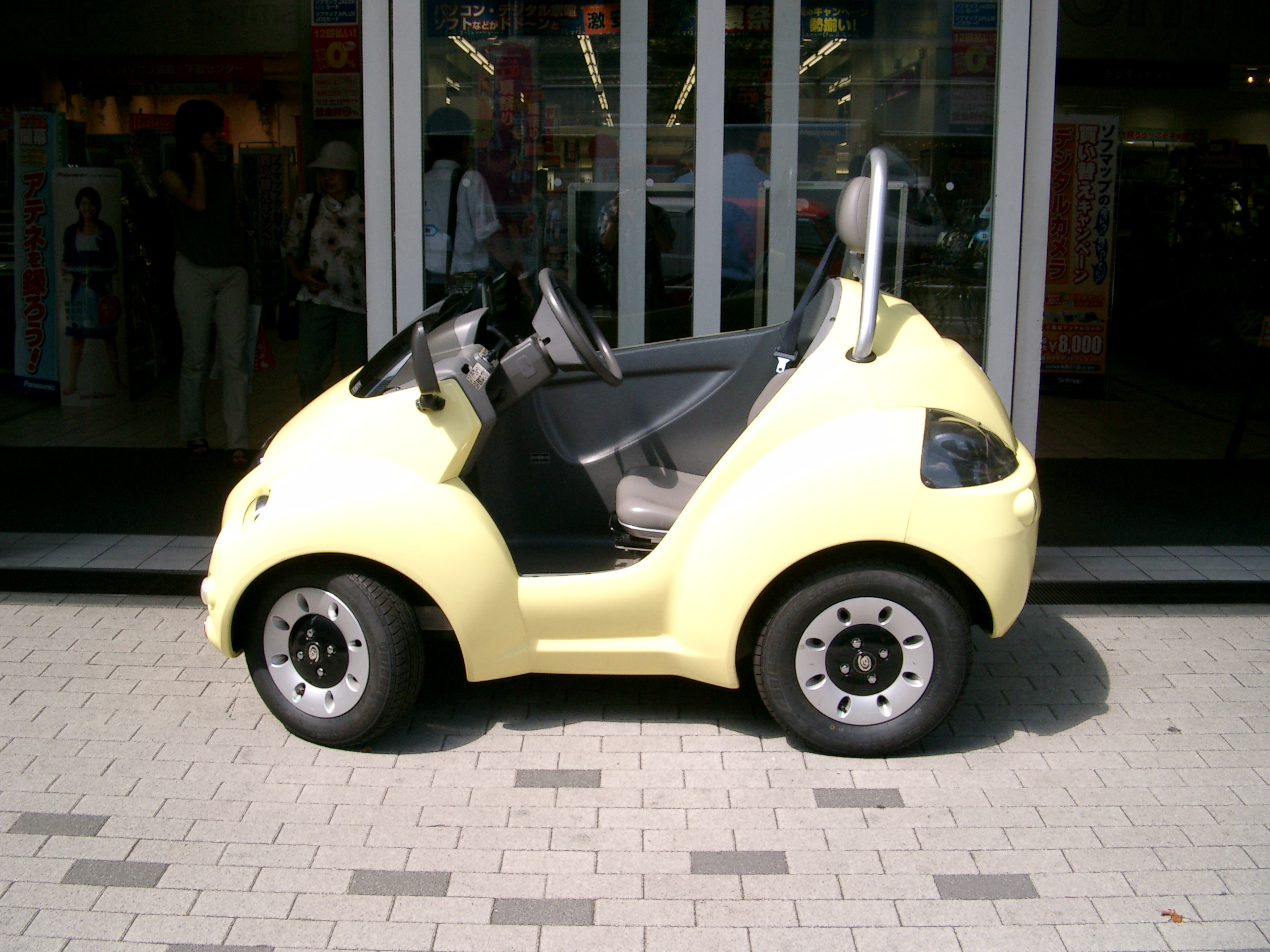
Q-Car Qi, small electric car

Takara has manufactured several unusual gadgets marketed as "life entertainment products". An example is BowLingual which aimed to translate the sounds of dogs to human language. The BowLingual was named as one of the best inventions of 2002 by Time magazine. See also Yumemi Kobo (dream generator).

=== Robots ===
In 2005, Takara produced Walkie Bits, a colorful, multi-function miniature robotic turtle. it was named Time magazine's best invention in a robot category.

=== Miscellaneous ===
In the 1980s, Takara as an OEM also sold Sord M5 home computers.

In 2002, Takara developed and released a real-life, road legal small electric car based on its Choro-Q toys through its new motor subsidiary. However due to low sales these cars were soon axed.
