= Endigo =

Swedish drag queen and YouTuber

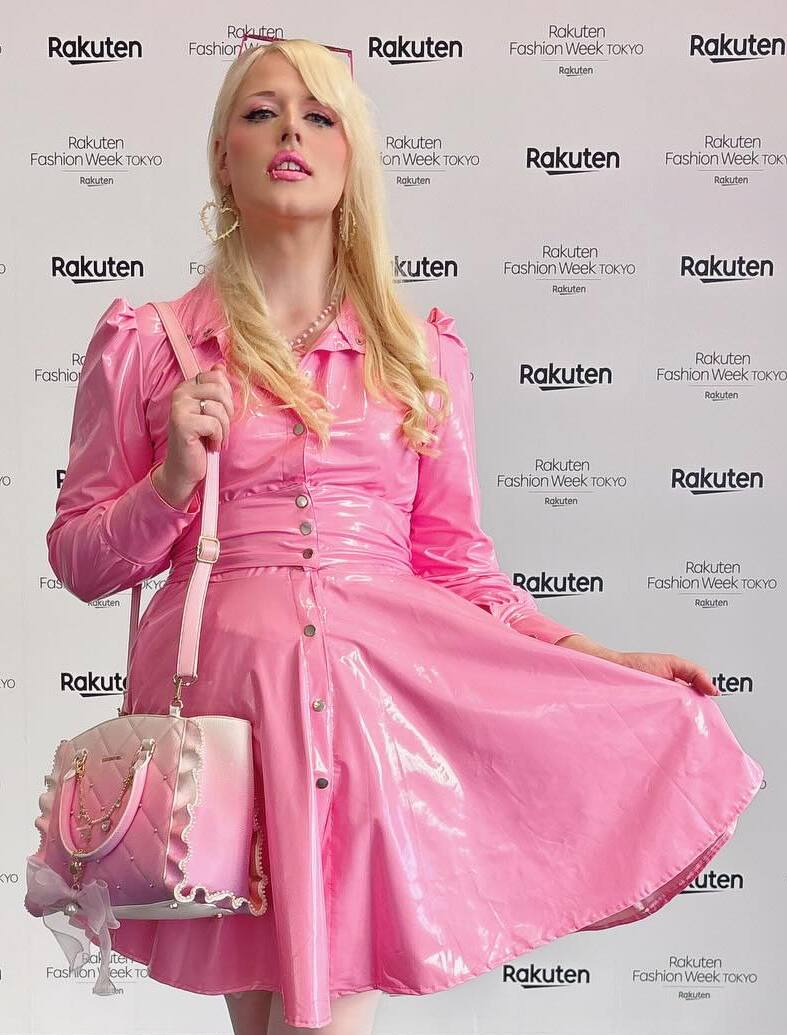
- Endigo at Rakuten Fashion Week Tokyo 2025
- Occupations: YouTuber; musician; drag queen
- Years active: 2010–present
- Known for: Overworld; BatAAr; Drag Race Sverige
- Musical career
- Instruments: Vocals; guitar
- Label: Mr. Poke

YouTube information
- Channel: Endigo
- Years active: 2006–present
- Genre: Music
- Subscribers: 737 thousand
- Views: 250 million
- Last updated: 31 August 2024

Endigo Linnéa Bambi Öberg, known mononymously as Endigo, is a Swedish artist, music producer and drag queen. She (Note: Endigo uses she/her and they/them pronouns. This article uses she/her for consistency.) is the best known for her work as a metal singer, performing songs for games and anime including Tekken 7 (2015), BanG Dream! Poppin' Dream! (2022), Final Fantasy VII Rebirth (2024), as well as voicing the character Eustace Winner for Ace Attorney Investigations Collection (2024). She is also a TV personality, participating in the first season of Drag Race Sverige and is the creator of several viral meme songs.

== Career ==
=== 2009–2014: Early musical career ===
Coming from a family of musicians, Endigo grew up always wanting to do music for a living. In 2009, after attending a MUCC concert in Stockholm, Endigo discovered her love for Japanese music and would go on to begin her professional music career as the lead guitarist for the Swedish visual kei-inspired band, Still Echo. After departing from Still Echo, Endigo subsequently formed a new band called Overworld in 2011. In 2013, the music video for My Reality won the International Platinum Award at the "Wasaga Beach Short Film Festival". Endigo left the band in 2014.

=== 2015–2022: YouTube ventures and viral songs ===
In 2016, Endigo became a vocalist for BatAAr. The band's song "Vrede" was featured on Japanese video game Tekken 7. It was also featured on her mini-album GRAVITAS released later that year. This made BatAAr the first rock band to ever be featured in a Tekken game. BatAAr would go on to tour Japan during 2016.

Endigo has also collaborated with and composed music for various artists such as Donna Burke, - with whom Endigo created the Making it in Japan podcast - Babybeard, and Guy Perryman for InterFM.

Endigo launched her self-titled YouTube channel in 2013, initially as a hobby, focusing on music covers, original songs, and vlogs. She later expanded her content to include video game playthroughs, collaborations with other YouTubers, including TheOdd1sOut, and remixes of popular internet memes. The channel would gain notoriety in 2017, after PewDiePie featured reacted to one of Endigo's remix music videos. Following this, Endigo would go on to create many more remixes of popular YouTubers such as Ninja and DanTDM, who in turn would often react to her in their videos.

During her career, Endigo has created many viral songs based around popular internet memes. One of these include Big Chungus, a theme song for a fictional video game of the same name that gained notoriety online in 2018. In 2021, Endigo released a song called Huggy Wuggy, based on a character from the video game Poppy Playtime. The song gained popularity in 2022 when it went viral on TikTok, with users (mainly children) incorporating it into her Poppy Playtime-related videos. This led to some controversy, as parents around the world expressed concerns about their children's safety due to the song's graphic and violent lyrics and the game's creature design. Many articles worldwide covered the song, translating the lyrics into different languages and discussing its potential dangers.

In 2021, after a comment made by DanTDM where he mentioned wanting to make a song with Endigo followed by eight months of no communication, Endigo released a comedic opera song called DanTDM Betrayed Me in which she sang about her frustration in the role of a typical Disney villain. DanTDM would respond to the song in a video called "I'm a Bad Person", in which he reiterated his want to make a song with Endigo and claiming this seemed like the beginning of Endigo's "villain arc". Endigo would respond with another song called The Cursing of DanTDM to which DanTDM responded with a video called "i have been cursed.." This led to a back-and-forth between Endigo and DanTDM in which they would communicate through Endigo's opera songs, and DanTDM's response videos. In early 2022, Endigo would release the song Goodbye DanTDM, seemingly ending the saga with 11 total songs having been made. These songs would eventually be remade in Japanese and put out as 悪役の物語, a symphonic rock opera album.

=== 2023–2024: Drag Race Sverige, Final Fantasy VII, Ace Attorney ===
In 2023, Endigo participated in the first season of Drag Race Sverige, the Swedish adaptation of the reality competition series RuPaul's Drag Race. She gained recognition for her creative runway looks and performances, showcasing her versatility and talent in the competition. On the show, Endigo opened up about the possibility of identifying as transgender but stated that she was not sure yet. In the first episode, Endigo landed at the bottom and won the lip-sync against Almighty Aphroditey to "Puss & Kram" by Daniela Rathana. Later on, she was placed at the bottom again with Elecktra and lost the lip-sync to "Sexual Revolution" by Army of Lovers, finishing in 7th place.

Following her appearance on Drag Race Sverige, Endigo announced that she had signed a management partnership with the Swedish company Clap Your Hands AB. In 2024, Endigo released several singles, including All Star and The Age of AGI. All Star charted as #1 on the iTunes Rock chart and was subsequently nominated for a WOWIE Award, marking her return to solo music releases during this period. Throughout 2024, she performed at festivals, conventions, and live events across Europe and North America, including multiple appearances at RuPaul's DragCon as well as live performances in Sweden. In the same year, it was announced that Endigo had contributed vocals to the soundtrack of Final Fantasy VII Rebirth, performing death vocals for the Desert Rush track. Soon after, she would work on another track for Final Fantasy Record Keeper titled Deadnight

In late 2024, Endigo relocated back to Japan, resuming her base in Tokyo while continuing international music and video game–related work. Following the relocation in 2024, Endigo was cast in the English version of Ace Attorney Investigations Collection, providing the voice of the character Eustace Winner. The collection features remastered entries from the Ace Attorney Investigations subseries, and the role marked her first appearance as an English voice actor within the Ace Attorney franchise.

=== 2025–present: Babybeard, Solo releases, media appearances ===
In January 2025, Endigo released the single Lip Killer, accompanied by an official music video, marking her first solo release of the year. The release continued her return to original music following her relocation back to Japan. Throughout 2025, Endigo expanded her public profile through television and digital media appearances, including an episode of Hooked on the Look, which featured Endigo alongside her partner Alison Jones and highlighted her lifestyle and aesthetic in Tokyo. In August, Endigo and the Japanese metal idol project Babybeard announced that she would serve as the composer and producer for the group's debut full-length album. The group released the album's lead single MACHO! later that month, followed by subsequent releases, including the symphonic metal–influenced track SEMI-FINAL.

Later in 2025, Endigo co-founded the indie game studio Pink Pill Productions, publicly announcing the studio and sharing early updates on its creative direction and projects. Her debut title Shadow Lullaby was released for free in October 2025, with Endigo composing the soundtrack.

== Personal life ==
Endigo came out as non-binary in 2022 and used any pronouns. In 2023, Endigo announced on Instagram that she is dating Alison "Kawaiiconic" Jones. They got engaged in 2025. In November 2023, Endigo came out as a transgender woman. In early 2026, she underwent facial feminization surgery in South Korea.

== Awards and nominations ==
Year	Award	Category	Nominated work	Result
2013	Wasaga Beach Short Film Festival	Platinum Award	Overworld - 'My Reality'	Won
2024	QX Awards	Best TV Show	Drag Race Sverige	Won
2024	The Game Awards	Best Score and Music	Final Fantasy VII Rebirth	Won

== Notable work ==
=== Video games ===
Year	Title	Role	Notes	Reference
2016	Tekken 7 Fated Retribution	Singer	'VREDE'	
2017	Tekken 7	Singer	'VREDE'	
2022	Deathverse: Let it Die	English VA	Trailer voices	
2022	Pitstop in Purgatory	Composer		
2022	P Street Fighter V	Singer, Lyricist	'ASCEND'	
2023	Poetry in Purgatory	Composer		
2023	ALICE Fiction	Singer	'Amnesia'	
2024	Tekken 8	English VA	Additional voices	
2024	Final Fantasy VII Rebirth	Singer	'Desert Rush'	
2024	Ace Attorney Investigations 2: Prosecutor's Gambit	English VA	Eustace Winner	
2024	Final Fantasy Record Keeper	Singer	'Deadnight'	
2025	Shadow Lullaby	Composer		

=== TV, film, and radio ===
Year	Title	Role	Notes	Reference
2018	Robert Geinin Promotion	Self		
2020	The Guy Perryman Show	Composer, Singer		
2021	COOL JAPAN〜発掘!かっこいいニッポン〜	Self		
2021	Sony Bravia XR	Narrator	TV Commercial VO	
2021	Making it in Japan Podcast	Host, producer	With Donna Burke	
2022	BanG Dream! Poppin'Dream!	Singer	'It's time to wake up', 'What we need', Your smile'	
2022	Let's Play English	Singer	Monster Land	
2022	Ghost in the Shell: SAC 2045	Singer	Don't Break Me Down (Uncredited)	
2023	Drag Race Sverige	Self, Contestant	7th place	
2023	Drag Race Sverige: Untucked	Self, Contestant	7th place	
2025	Hooked on the Look	Self		
2025	Linzor: Unfiltered	Self		

=== Music Production ===
Year	Artist	Title	Roles	Reference
2015	Clavister	TVCM	Composer, Music production	
2019	BatAAr	'Ghostmodern(ism)'	Composer, Music production	
2019	BatAAr	'The Final Train'	Composer, Music production	
2019	Boogie2988	'My Way'	Music production	
2020	Donna Burke	'Tournament'	Composer, Music production	
2020	Virtual People	'With the Power of Music'	Composer, Music production	
2020	Maya Fennec	'Million Pieces'	Mixing, Mastering	
2021	Donna Burke	'Cosplay Anthem'	Music production	
2022	Overworld	Time is Music (EP)	Music production	
2023	Kawaiiconic	'Chasing Trains'	Mixing, Mastering	
2023	Imaa Queen	'Intrasslad'	Composer, Music production	
2023	Babybeard	'Twisted Kaiju Tale'	Composer, Music production	
2023	Babybeard	'Optisquad'	Composer, Music production	
2025	Babybeard	''MACHO!'	Composer, Music production	
2025	Babybeard	''SEMI-FINAL'	Composer, Music production	

== Discography ==
=== Endigo ===
Year	Title	Notes	Reference
2015	'Promised Land'		
2015	'World Carries On'		
2015	'Kickoff'		
2015	Year of Independence (Album)	Debut Solo Album	
2017	'Peace!'		
2018	'See You in Tokyo!'		
2018	'I'm Still Here'		
2018	'Big Chungus'		
2019	'Burn Together'		
2019	'My Senpai'	Featuring Bijuu Mike	
2019	'Tomorrow is in Your Hands'		
2019	'Face OFF'	Featuring Caleb Hyles and Party in Backyard	
2019	'This is Halloween'	Featuring TheOdd1sOut, OR3O, Day by Dave, CG5, and Maya Fennec	
2020	Inter. (Album)	Remastered single compilation	
2020	'Stone Cold Killer'	With Party in Backyard and Day by Dave	
2021	'Poggers!'		
2021	'Canceled'		
2021	'Huggy Wuggy'	Featuring Maya Fennec	
2022	Akuyaku no monogatari [悪役の物語]	First Japanese album	
2022	'Metal Queens'	Featuring Babybeard	
2022	'Mommy Long Legs'	Featuring Maya Fennec	
2022	'Kissy Missy'	Featuring Maya Fennec	
2023	'Metaverse'	In collaboration with Drag Race Sverige	
2023	'Living as a Ghost'		
2023	'CatNap'	Featuring Maya Fennec	
2024	'All Star'	#1 on iTunes Rock Charts in Sweden, WOWIE Nominated	
2024	'The Age of AGI'		
2025	'Lip Killer'		
2025	'Doey the Doughman'		
2025	'The Great Meme Reset'	Featuring Kawaiiconic	
2025	'Dead Internet'	Featuring Kawaiiconic	
2026	'Huggy Wuggy (2026 Version)'		
2026	'Lily Lovebraids'	Featuring Kawaiiconic	

=== Overworld ===
Year	Title	Notes	Reference
2012	Perfect Anomaly (EP)		
2013	'My Reality'	Platinum Winner, Wasaga Beach Short Film Festival	
2013	'Final Destination'		
2014	Bring Down the Sky (EP)		
2022	Time is Music (EP)		

=== BatAAr ===
Year	Title	Notes	Reference
2016	Rebirth		
2016	'Always Die Young'		
2016	'VREDE'	Featured on Tekken 7	
2016	GRAVITAS (Album)		
2018	'Devour'		
2018	'Under Isen'		
2019	'GHOSTMODERN(ism)'	Mixing, mastering by Endigo	
2019	'The Final Train'	Mixing, mastering by Endigo	
