= The Watanabes =

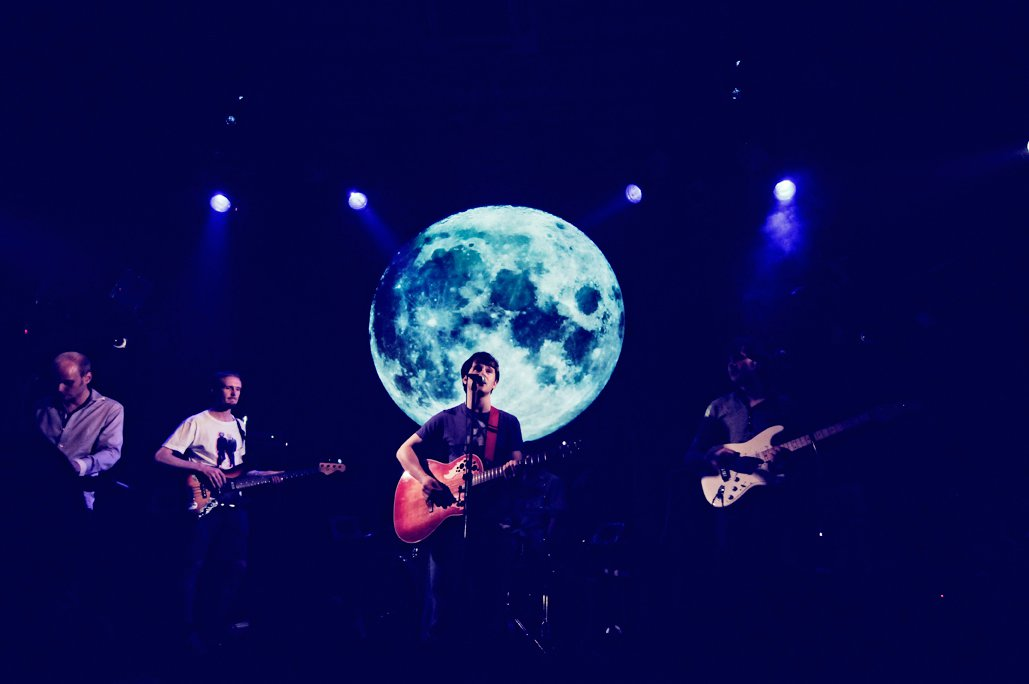
- The Watanabes performing live in Tokyo, 2011.

Background information
- Origin: Japan
- Genres: Indie pop
- Years active: 2005–present
- Labels: Babyboom Records Japan
- Members: Duncan Walsh; Selwyn Walsh; Ayumi Sato; Tomoyuki Yamada
- Past members: Flavio Jerome; Ashley Davies; Stefan Samuelsson; Tadashi Yoshikawa; Yoko Osawa; Matt Hogan
- Website: thewatanabes.com

The Watanabes are a 1960s-influenced British indie pop rock band based in Tokyo whose lyrics are often inspired by life in Japan.

== Musical style ==
The band's jangly alt pop sound has drawn comparisons to melody driven indie acts such as Belle and Sebastian, Teenage Fan Club, Crowded House, and 1980s Liverpool band The Pale Fountains, while their lyrics often touch upon their experiences in Japan. Time Out have portrayed them as "Tokyo's answer to The Smiths" although their soft acoustic melodies and retro sound make an easier comparison to musical acts from the 1960s such as Simon and Garfunkel, The Beatles, or The Kooks.

== Members ==
The band are fronted by British brothers Duncan and Selwyn Walsh on vocals and guitar. The Walsh brothers come from the small village of Swanton Novers in Norfolk. New Zealander Ashley Davies and Belgian Flavio Jerome were also founding members and co-songwriters but have since left the group. Since their formation in 2005, a number of other musicians have made contributions to the band including Ayumi Sato on bass, Tomoyuki Yamada on drums, and Lensei Nishizawa on piano.

== History ==
=== Formation ===
The Watanabes formed during the summer of 2005 in the rural prefecture of Ehime in Japan, where Duncan Walsh and Ashley Davies were working as ALTs on the JET Programme. Watanabe is a common surname in this region of Japan, and the group partly used the name in order to ingratiate themselves with the locals, whilst also alluding to British band The Smiths. The initial inspiration for the name, however, came from fictional character, Toru Watanabe, the slightly troubled and over nostalgic protagonist in Haruki Murakami's novel, Norwegian Wood.

In April 2007 they sent off their first demo to the Fuji Rock Festival, and were selected alongside bands such as The Bawdies and Avengers in Sci-Fi in the top 50 nominees for the Rookie a go stage. In August of the same year they moved to Tokyo where they began work on their debut album, Independent Social Power. Recorded at KRH Studios in Harajuku, the album was independently released in association with Manchester based record label BabyBoom Records.

=== Tokyo years ===
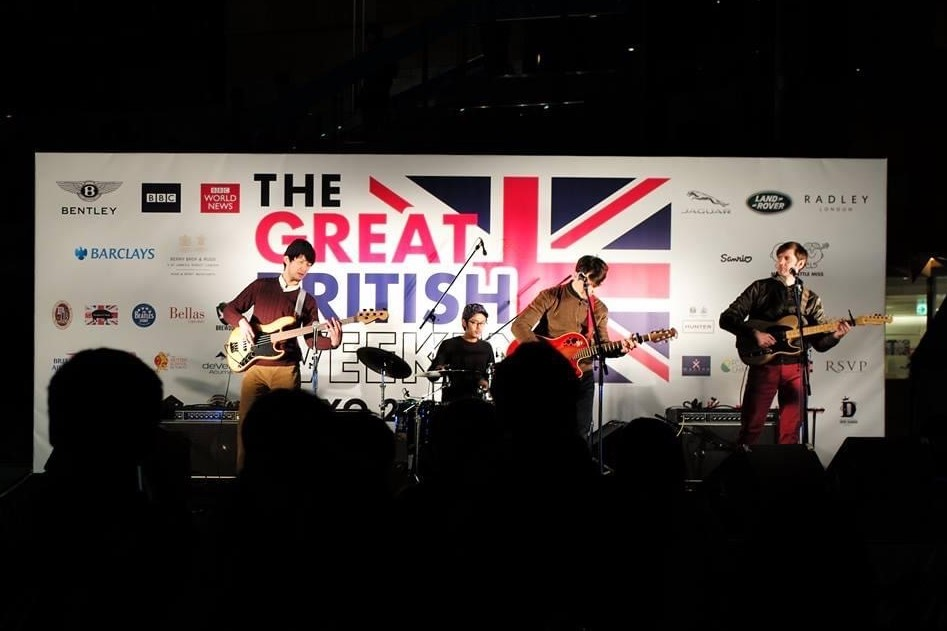
The Watanabes performing at The Great British Weekend in Tokyo in December 2017.

After releasing their debut album, the band hijacked their way on to Japanese national TV channel Nihon TV before featuring in several of Japan's English speaking publications including The Japan Times, Metropolis, Japanzine, Tokyo Weekender, and Time Out. This publicity brought them to the attention of Glaswegian music producer Dave Naughton, who had just moved to Japan to become a producer in his own right after working alongside Steve Power in London and Tony Doogan in Glasgow with bands such as Belle and Sebastian and Teenage Fan Club. They began work together on The Watanabes' second album, You're Dancing I'm Absorbed, which was released in February 2011. It included guest appearances from American singer songwriter Kate Sikora and British multi-instrumentalist Nick Duffy of The Lilac Time. In December 2011 two tracks from the album, "True Romantics" and "Concerned With You", were used in a TV advertising campaign for Triumph Motorcycles. An instrumental version of "True Romantics" was also adopted by Western Union as a theme tune to advertise their services.

Another track from the album, acoustic green lullaby "Whales Can Sing" was championed by Ric O'Barry, star of the Academy Award winning documentary The Cove, as well as race car driver and environmental activist Leilani Munter. On August 29, 2013, The Watanabes performed live in Tokyo with former Guns N' Roses drummer Matt Sorum at an event organized by Ric O'Barry's Dolphin Project. Other foreign artists to have shared the stage with The Watanabes while touring Japan include Stu Larsen, Die! Die! Die!, Lisa Crawley and former Voxtrot frontman Ramesh Srivastava.

The band have received praise for their fundraising efforts, particularly in aid of Tohoku following the Tohoku earthquake. In 2014 they released a collaborative music video with NPO Playground of Hope.

Despite performing and recording primarily in Japan, The Watanabes have featured regularly on the BBC Introducing Series in the UK. In October 2017 they performed live from Tokyo as part of BBC Introducing's 10th Anniversary celebrations.

=== Spoiled and Nostalgic ===
In the autumn of 2014 The Watanabes released a 5 track EP entitled Draw What You Like. Three tracks from the record were adopted by CNN International for a documentary on food in Japan. Their fourth record, a four track EP entitled Spoiled and Nostalgic, was released digitally on November 25, 2016. The title was taken from an unflattering review by Japanzine of their first album (Independent Social Power), which described The Watanabes as “spoiled and nostalgic in 21st century Tokyo.” A year later, the band joined forces with Japanese indie label Musipl, combining the two EPs to release a full 9 track album of the same name. In September 2016, BBC Radio Norfolk made "Hummingbird" Track of the Week, and soon after, another track from the album, "Tonight", was included in Tom Robinson's BBC Mixtape, aired on BBC Radio 6. The album has also become a favourite of InterFM DJ Guy Perryman (MBE), who invited the band to perform live on his radio show, as well as fellow InterFM DJ and producer Mike Rogers who likens the band to Belle and Sebastian and included "Over Romantic" in his top 50 songs of 2016.

=== Christmas Hummingbird ===
In early 2020 InterFM DJ Guy Perryman (MBE) approached The Watanabes to ask whether they would be willing to rework one of their previously released tracks, "Hummingbird". After becoming a fan of the track and playing the song on his Christmas radio show, Guy sensed that with a few simple lyrical adjustments and some musical alterations, the song could be re-released as a festive single. Inspired by Guy's vision and assisted by the additional collaborative efforts of producer David Naughton and Australian composer Nicholas Buc, The Watanabes released "Christmas Hummingbird" on November 2, 2020. The animated music video accompanying the track was premiered by the British Chamber of Commerce in Japan at the 2020 British Business Awards.

== Appearances in Fiction ==
The Watanabes' Japan influenced lyrics and reputation as local favourites with the international community in Tokyo may explain their presence in the German rainbow romance novel Geborgenheit sucht Reisepartner by Lili B. Wilms, in which the main character Kieran, a self-proclaimed fan of the band, visits Japan to watch them perform live at a Tokyo music venue. On the front cover of the novel, an illustrated character is also depicted wearing a T-shirt emblazoned with The Watanabes logo and artwork reminiscent of their second album, You're Dancing I'm Absorbed.

Music by The Watanabes also features in Danny Goes Aum, a movie directed by Indian film maker Sandeep Mohan. The film's chief protagonist, a burned out British video editor called Danny, listens to "Yuriko Yuriko" while drinking a beer and watching the sun set at a beach-side café in Goa. "Drench You in Sun" and "Make Things Better" can also be heard playing on the radio at other points in the movie.

== Releases ==
Independent Social Power (2009)
There Are Ghosts Around Here EP (2009)
You're Dancing I'm Absorbed (2011)
Draw What You Like EP (2014)
Spoiled and Nostalgic EP (2016)
Spoiled and Nostalgic (2017)
Christmas Hummingbird (2020)
