= Spjuth =

Spjuth is a surname. Notable people with the surname include:

- Adam Spjuth (born 1993), stage name of Imaa Queen, Swedish drag queen
- Arthur Spjuth (1904–1989), Swedish art director
- Kalle Spjuth (born 1984), Swedish bandy player
