= Kayo Shekoni =

Swedish singer and actress

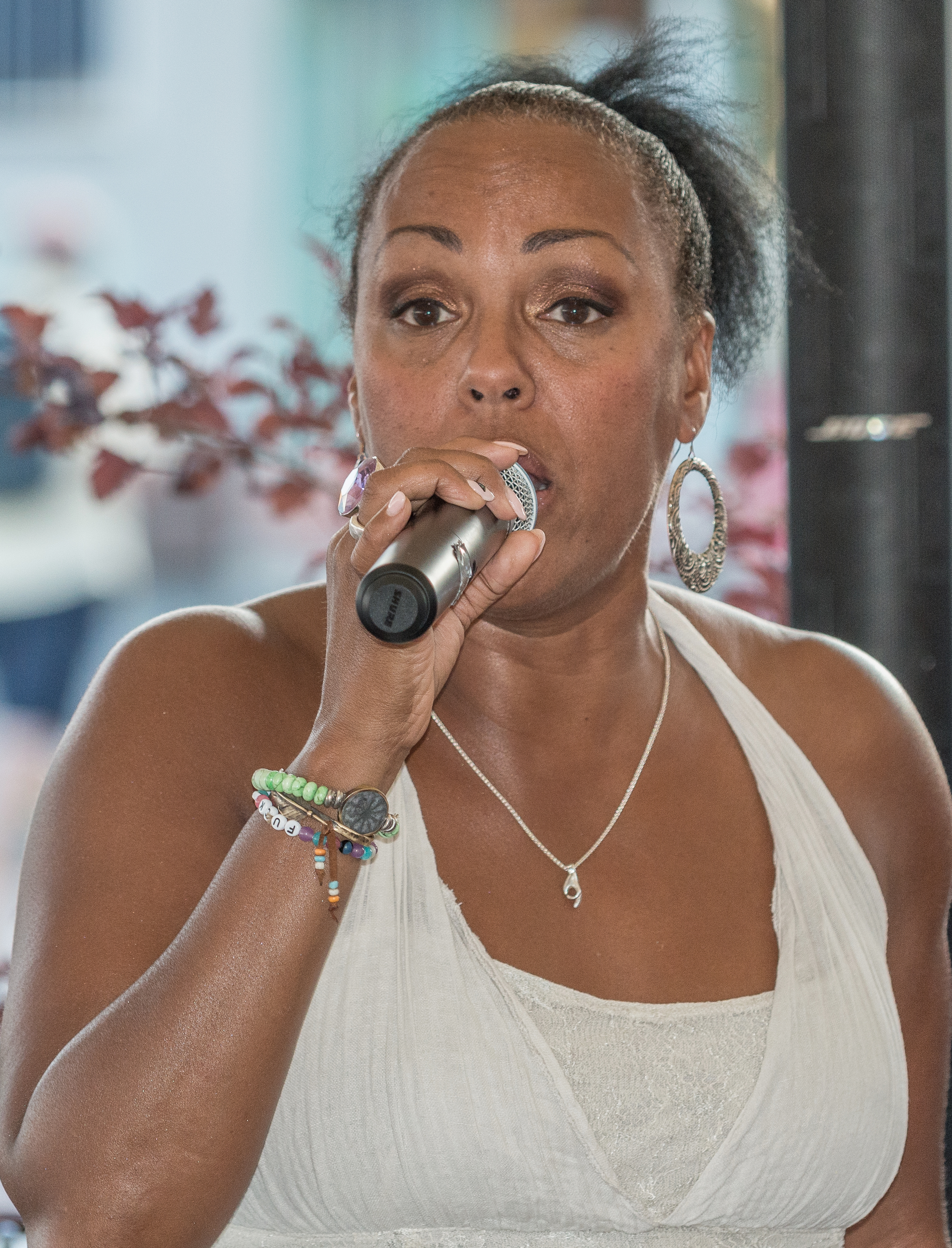
- Shekoni performing in 2014
- Born: Kayode Maria Söderberg Shekoni; 17 April 1964 (age 62); Järfälla, Sweden
- Occupations: Singer, actress
- Years active: 1980s–present
- Musical career
- Genres: Pop; dance
- Instrument: Vocals
- Formerly of: Freestyle; La Bouche; Afro-dite; Le Click
- Website: kayo.se

Kayode Maria Söderberg Shekoni (born 17 April 1964), known professionally as Kayo, is a Swedish singer and actress.

== Career ==
Kayo started out as a singer in the 1980s with the Swedish synth-pop band Freestyle. Kayo left the group following the release of the fourth single, "Vill ha dej". She then worked as a backup singer and dancer for various Swedish artists such as The Creeps, NASA, and Anders Glenmark.

She is a classically trained ballet dancer and performed professionally for many years. In 1990, she became part of the Nordic beat scene and released a self-titled, club-soul-influenced album on the SweMix Label. The music was mostly new jack swing, but some tracks incorporated reggae, house and hip hop influences. It was produced by label co-founder Stonebridge, with Christian Falk and Alexander Bard (from Army of Lovers). She released four hit singles from the album. Her second album was a Swedish-language soul-pop album entitled Kärleksland and featured songs by Orup, and was well received on radio.

After acting in a couple of teenage movies in the mid-1990s, she became one-half of Le Click, which had several hit singles in North America and Germany during the 1990s. Later, she became part of the pop group Afro-dite in the early 2000s, reaching the finals at Melodifestivalen 2002 with the song "Never Let It Go" and representing Sweden in the Eurovision Song Contest in Tallinn the same year. In 2003, Afro-dite competed once again at Melodifestivalen with the song "Aqua Playa".

In 2006, Kayo performed at Melodifestivalen as a solo artist but did not reach the finals. She has released several solo singles, such as "Another Mother" (No. 11 in Sweden) in 1991, and "(If It Makes You) Feel Good" in 2006. Kayo has also hosted Förkväll on TV4 and Fångarna på fortet ( the latter with cross-country skiing star Gunde Svan).

She worked for a while as a skin therapist but never left the entertainment industry.

In spring 2010, she performed at Melodifestivalen, not as a competitor, but as part of a medley of past winning songs with several previous winners. In 2010, she co-hosted a four-episode pan-Scandinavian TV series Inför Eurovision Song Contest 2010, analyzing all the competing songs submitted to that year's Eurovision Song Contest. She also works as a DJ, co-runs a nightclub, and performs with the disco and cocktail jazz band Cotton Club and Afro-Dite. She returned to Melodifestivalen with Afro-Dite in 2012.

She has been very active on theatre stages with B.U.S., directed by Josette Bushell-Mingo, Raisin in the Sun with the National Theatre (and touring with the play in Sweden and Finland, and taking the production to South Africa and the US), Norrbottens Teatern's production of Cabaret, The Witches of Eastwick (the latter with West End star Peter Jöback), Taube Today at Västmanlands Teater, and Uppsala City Theatre.

She has also performed at Le Click reunion concerts.

In 2023, Kayo became part of the main jury panel, along with Swedish actor, performance artist, playwright, and drag queen Robert Fux, and radio and television host Farao Groth, of the Swedish language reality television series Drag Race Sverige, broadcast on SVT1 and SVT Play in Sweden and internationally on WOW Presents Plus.

== Personal life ==
Shekoni was born to a Nigerian father and Swedish mother in Sweden.

== Activism ==
At the 2025 Academy Awards, she wore black shoes with "Free Congo" written twice on the soles, showing solidarity with the African country amid ongoing political violence.

== Discography ==
=== Albums ===
Full information

- Kayo (1990)
- Kärleksland (1993)
- Out There (featuring Kayo) (1996)
- Le Click (featuring Kayo) (US and Germany only) (1997)
- Never Let It Go (with Afro-dite) (2002)
- Sisters in Crime (2016)

=== Singles ===
- "Vill ha dej" (with Freestyle) (1980)
- "Time's on My Side" (with The Supereffect) (1984)
- "Hot Stuff" (with Stanton Klub) (1988)
- "Hon sa" (with Anders Glenmark) (1990)
- "Natural Experience" (only released in the UK) (1990)
- "Säg vad du vill/Tid för mig" (with Jean-Paul Wall) (1990)
- "Change of Attitude" (1990)
- "Another Mother" (1990)
- "Gimme Your Love" (1991)
- "Brother" (1991)
- "Do You Know" (with Lab 5) (1991)
- "Thing Called Love" (with Natural Experience) (1992)
- "Don't Leave Me" (with Natural Experience) (1992)
- "Om natten" (1993)
- "Sommar" (1993)
- "Kärleksland" (1993)
- "Torka dina tårar" (1993)
- "Om du vill ha mig som jag är" (1993)
- "Let It Begin – Peace in Mind" (with Out There) (1996)
- "These Honest Hands" (with Out There) (1996)
- "Call Me" (with Le Click) (1997)
- "Call Me-New Mixes" (with Le Click) (1997)
- "Don't Go" (with Le Click) (1997)
- "Voodoo Fever" (with Le Click) (1997)
- "Show Me" (with Le Click) (1997)
- "Tell Me That You Want Me" (with Le Click) (1997)
- "Something To Dream Of" (with Le Click) (1997)
- "If I Can't Have You" (with LFO) (1998)
- "Wannabe (Somebody Special)" (1998)
- "Never Let It Go" (with Afro-dite) (2002)
- "Rivers of Joy/Shining Star" (with Afro-dite) (2002)
- "I Love Clubbers" (with Clubbers International) (2002)
- "Turn It Up" (with Afro-dite) (2002)
- "Aqua Playa" (with Afro-dite) (2003)
- "In Your Life" (with La Bouche) (2003)
- "Innan natten är över" (2006)
- "(If It Makes You) Feel Good" (2007)
- "I Am What I Am" (with Afro-dite and Jonas Hedqvist) (2011)
- "The Boy Can Dance" (with Afro-dite) (2012)
- "You Got The Look (Foxy)" (2012)
- "Freeze" (2016)
- "Do You Love Me" (2021)
- "Never Let It Go 2022" (with Afro-dite, remix by SoundFactory) (2022)
- "We're Back" (with Afro-dite) (2022)
- "Every Queen" (with Robert Fux) (2023)
