= Admira Thunderpussy =

Swedish drag performer

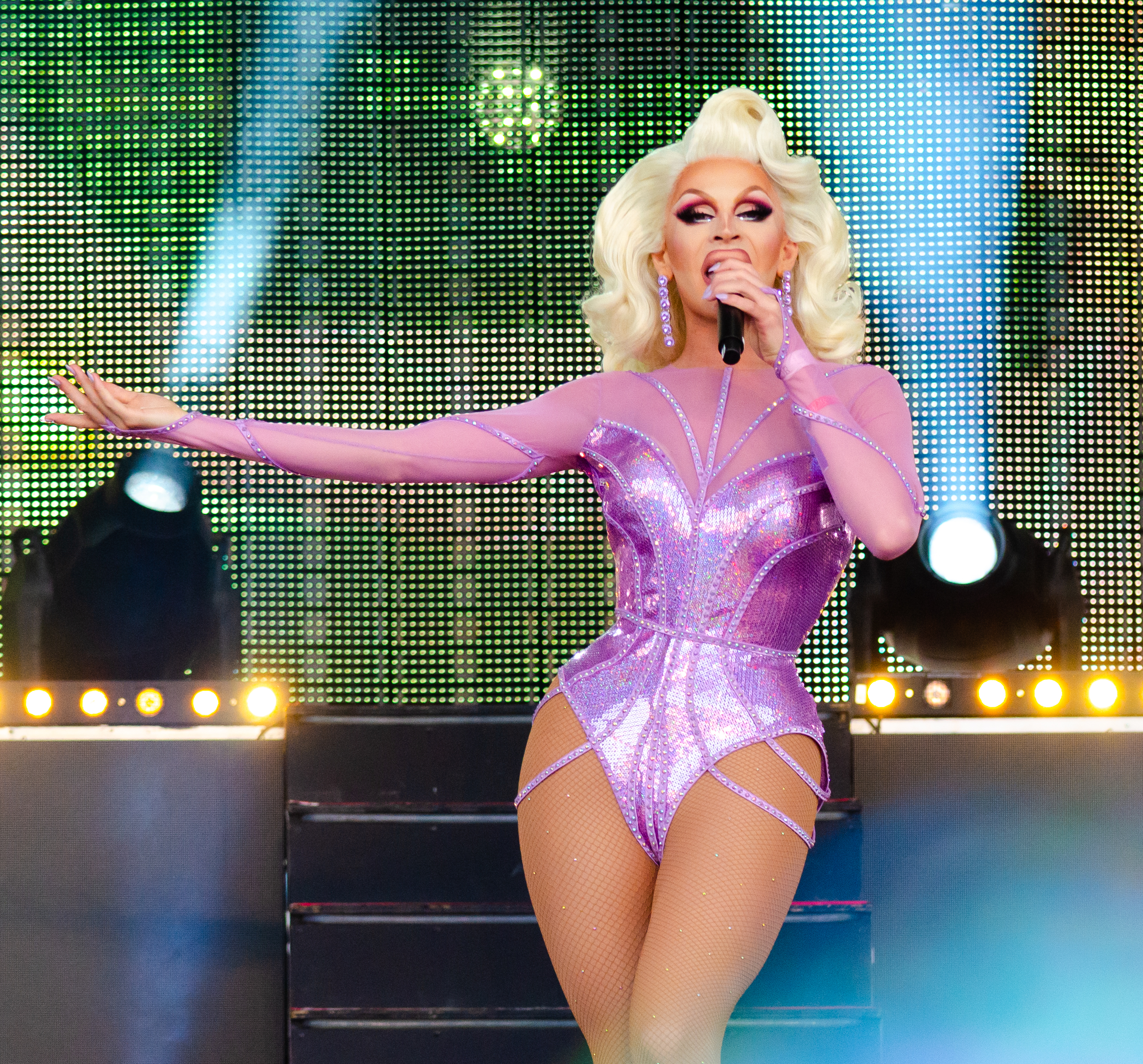
- Admira Thunderpussy performing in 2023
- Born: Adam Daniel Risberg; 16 March 1994 (age 31); Södermalm, Stockholm, Sweden
- Other names: Admira
- Occupation: Drag queen
- Television: Drag Race Sverige
- Website: admirathunderpussy.com

Admira Thunderpussy, also known simply as Admira, is the stage name of Adam Daniel Risberg, a Swedish drag performer best known for winning the first season of Drag Race Sverige.

== Early life ==
Risberg was born and raised in Södermalm, Stockholm, Sweden. At the age of 17, in his senior year of high school at Södra Latin, he produced, choreographed, and starred in a drag show as a finishing project at his school that eventually landed him jobs in local gay clubs and at Stockholm Pride. After the show, Swedish drag star Christer Lindarw, whom had been invited to the show, physically embraced Risberg. He was inspired to try drag by Jackie Beat and Varla Jean Merman. His drag name originates from a "similar version" of his birth name, Adam, combined with Thunderpussy, as it "just felt right". Before settling on "Admira", he nearly donned "Adore" as his drag name. He cites his grandmother as one of his inspirations, describing her as extremely supportive of his career and sexuality.

== Career ==
Admira Thunderpussy was nominated for the QX Förlag award "Drag of the Year", which is awarded at the annual QX Gaygalan Awards, in 2014. She was nominated again for the title in 2017, and won.

In February 2023, Admira Thunderpussy was announced as one of the nine contestants on Drag Race Sverige, the Swedish spinoff of RuPaul's Drag Race. She won the fourth (Snatch Game), fifth (musical performance), and seventh (acting) episodes, and was later crowned the winner of the season against Fontana.

== Personal life ==
Risberg is based in Stockholm. As a result of the pressure to constantly perform, among other things, he suffered from a drug addiction before the filming of Drag Race Sverige until he decided to seek help after an experience of flunitrazepam-induced psychosis.

== Filmography ==
=== Television ===
Year	Title	Role	Notes	Ref
2023	Drag Race Sverige	Herself	Winner (Season 1)	
2023	Drag Race Sverige: Untucked	Herself	Winner (Season 1)	
2023	Nyhetsmorgon	Herself	Guest	
2023	2023 Grammisgalan	Herself	Presented the Lyricist of the Year Award	
2023	Allsång på Skansen	Herself	Performer	

=== Web series ===
Year	Title	Role	Notes	Ref
2023	Paradrätten	Herself	Guest	
2023	Nyheter24	Herself	Guest with Imaa Queen	

== Discography ==
=== Featured singles ===
Title	Year	Album
"Every Queen" (with The Cast of Drag Race Sverige Season 1)	2023	non-album single
