= Lars Alexandersson =

Tekken character

- Tekken character
- Lars Alexandersson in Tekken 6: Bloodline Rebellion (2008)
- First appearance: Tekken 6: Bloodline Rebellion (2008)
- Designed by: Ninnin (Tekken 7)
- Voiced by: Junichi Suwabe; Zach Hanks (Street Fighter X Tekken, English)

In-universe information
- Fighting style: Tekken Force Martial Arts (based on Shorinji Kempo)
- Origin: Sweden
- Nationality: Swedish (Japanese descent)

Lars Alexandersson (Japanese: ラース・アレクサンダーソン, Hepburn: Rāsu Arekusandāson) is a character from the Tekken fighting game franchise by Bandai Namco Entertainment. First introduced in the 2008 arcade game update Tekken 6: Bloodline Rebellion, he serves as the main protagonist of the Tekken 6 story mode.

Introduced as the leader of the rebel group Yggdrasil (ユグドラシル, Yugudorashiru), Lars commands his forces against Jin Kazama in order to stop the war he started during the Tekken 6 storyline through his military group, the Mishima Zaibatsu. Wounded in the crossfire, Lars meets the robot Alisa Bosconovitch who accompanies him on a journey to find Jin. Since Tekken 6, Lars has become a recurring major protagonist in the franchise, and has appeared in the cross-over Street Fighter X Tekken and as a guest character in Naruto Shippuden: Ultimate Ninja Storm 2.

Conceived from a name idea for a Swedish character, Lars was given a moveset fitting with other strong characters in the series, to make him easy to use by newcomers to the franchise. While he became fairly popular among fans of the series, the character had a mixed reception from video game reviewers. Most critics praised his fighting style. His inclusion in Ultimate Ninja Storm 2 was praised for fitting in the cast thanks to manga author Masashi Kishimoto's take on the character.

== Creation ==
Game developer studio Namco had wanted to include a Tekken Force character to the series since Tekken 3. Lars was finally introduced to Tekken 6 in an arcade update titled Bloodline Rebellion which served as the consoles' official port. Lars' full name was proposed to the staff by an unknown woman from the Swedish embassy in Japan, years before Tekken 6 was developed. Tekken producer Katsuhiro Harada found it "cool" and immediately decided to use the name. Unlike other new Tekken 6 characters who were based on fan input, both Lars and fellow newcomer Alisa Bosconovitch were created using a different approach, focusing on their importance to the game's story. As a result, in the arcade version of Tekken 6, most of Lars' identity was kept a mystery, leaving it to the console versions' Scenario Campaign mode to explain his role in the series, with Harada teasing about his potential attack of Jin Kazama's forces. In response to claims that the story of Tekken was complicated, Harada denied as he saw it as a "simple" struggle between members from the Mishima family and how multiple characters are dragged into this. In regards to Tekken 8, Harada emphasized that the relationship the character has with Jin is close with the former asserting supportive role.

Across all his appearances, Lars has been voiced by Junichi Suwabe, including Street Fighter X Tekken Suwabe enjoyed voicing the character and expected his players to enjoy him in Tekken 7. He also commented about the Tekken 7 trailer where Lars and Noctis interact together.

=== Design ===
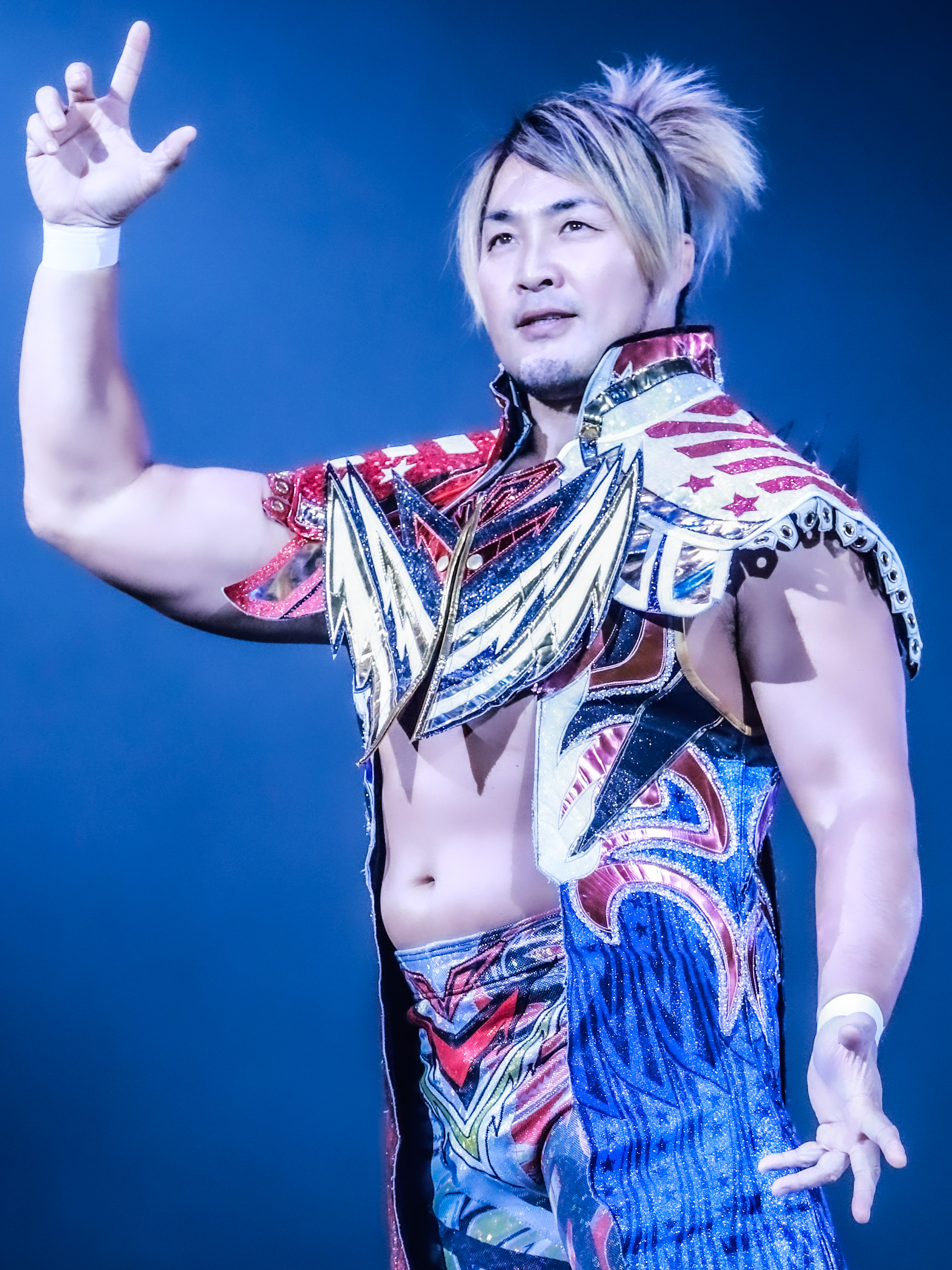
Hiroshi Tanahashi served as the inspiration for Lars' extra Tekken 7 outfit.

In early sketches, Lars was depicted as older than his in-game appearance, with a beard and a ponytail. Another rejected sketch featured Lars' complete Tekken Force design that covered his entire face and had a bigger cape. Lars was designed with the idea of him not being a corrupted protagonist, contrasting Jin Kazama and Kazuya Mishima's stories. His original outfit symbolizes multiple heroes in fiction with his armor being derived from Dragon Ball's Goku and Marvel Comics's Thor's designs. Michael Murray explained the Tekken team created Lars in order to appeal to the Nordic audiences based on the series popularity in that region.

As with several other characters from Tekken 6, Lars was given an alternate outfit designed by a manga artist, with Lars' being done by Masashi Kishimoto, author of the manga Naruto. In redesigning Lars, Kishimoto removed his Tekken Force outfit and gave him one made of a soft rubber material, marked with a lion figure on his right arm. He also made multiple cuts for the belt on the back, so that Lars' kicking techniques would be possible. Also, on the outfit's back are the numbers for Sweden's telephone country code: "46". Harada was impressed by Kishimoto's work, especailly with how fast he made Lars' sketch which inspired him to work once again with him.

In the Wii U version of Tekken Tag Tournament 2, Lars has an extra costume based on Link from Nintendo's The Legend of Zelda series. For Tekken 7, Lars was given another look by Akira Nishitani, aka Nin-Nin. After multiple drafts that gave Lars different colors and accessories, Nin-Nin made one which retains elements from the Tekken Force design, while adding a torn red cape. For Street Fighter X Tekken, Lars retains his Tekken 6 outfit, but is also given an alternate ninja outfit.

In October 2017, as part of a collaboration between Tekken's staff and New Japan Pro-Wrestling, it was revealed that Lars would be getting a new costume in Tekken 7, inspired by professional wrestler Hiroshi Tanahashi. When using this costume, he is given a new move known as "Sling Blade". The costume was released in Japanese arcades on November 18, 2017, while the console versions obtained it as free downloadable content on May 31, 2018. After the collaboration, Tanahashi praised the resulting change in Lars' design, as well as the incorporation of his own moves.

=== Gameplay ===
Lars' fighting style is based on the Shorinji Kempo martial arts, and is also known as the "Tekken Forces Martial Arts" (鉄拳衆特殊部隊格闘術, Tekkenshū tokushu butai kakutō-jutsu). Lars' gameplay style was made to fit with those of older characters in the series. The developers called him "quick and agile" based on his varied moves, which were intend to give players multiple strategic possibilities and prevent them from being cornered against a wall. They also intended that Lars be easy to use by newcomers, making his moves "unpredictable for opponents". Designer Yuichi Yonemori mentioned that Lars' fighting style is effective for countering aggressive players, due to his speed, which allow players to avoid taking too much damage in combat.

When Tekken 6 was first released, Namco Bandai received several complaints from fans about Lars being too powerful. Harada said that Lars' strength was intentional, and argued that every time a new character is introduced to the franchise, he might be perceived as stronger, as had happened with Akuma, who appears as a guest character in Tekken 7. Several of Lars' moves involve electricity, with one of his most powerful ones being named after Zeus (ゼウス, Zeusu), the Greek thunder god. For Capcom's crossover game Street Fighter X Tekken, the official guide encouraged players to use Lars' strong kicks in order to cancel his enemies' special attacks and get close to the rival. In Ninja Storm 2, Lars is a close-up fighter, also featuring electricity-based moves in contrast to other characters who rely on projectile techniques.

Harada said he thought Lars remained the strongest character to use in fighting tournaments, though others claim Steve Fox and the Mishimas – Jin, Kazuya and Heihachi – were stronger. For Tekken Tag Tournament 2, Harada revealed that Lars had been rebalanced from Tekken 6 in order to better fit with the cast of this spinoff. According to Tekken 7 visual design manager Kousuke Waki, Lars was one of the characters they updated, but at the same time they saved some of the changes for the "Fated Retribution" update, in order to make the transition to Tekken 7 more welcoming for returning Tekken 6 players.

=== Theme song ===
During the production of Tekken 7, Harada was impressed by the Swedish rock band BatAAr, and felt the game could benefit from their songs. As Lars is half-Swedish, he asked the band to compose the character's theme song, which he hoped fans of the franchise would look forward to hearing when playing the character. The group then went to Japanese arcades to play Tekken 7 as Lars while listening to their own music, which they found fitting. Honored by the proposal, the band said Harada had given them complete freedom as long as the song included Swedish lyrics to fit Lars' nationality. Band member Patrik, responsible for writing the lyrics, made extensive research about Lars' role in the Tekken series, as well as fan theories about him, in an attempt to understand Lars' characterization in Tekken 7 and make the lyrics fit. BatAAr's theme song for Lars was ultimately titled "Vrede" (Swedish for "Wrath"), and included in both a CD single as well as the original soundtrack of Tekken 7. The band took a liking to Lars to the point where all the band members played Tekken 7's tournament mode as him, singing "Vrede" during pauses. When using Tanahashi's costume, Lars' theme changes to "LOVE&ENERGY" by Yonosuke Kitamura.

== Appearances ==
=== In the Tekken series ===
Lars is the illegitimate son of Heihachi Mishima, who sired him as an experiment to see if he could pass on the powerful Devil Gene. Following Jin Kazama's victory at the King of Iron Fist Tournament, the Mishima Zaibatsu corporation declares a world war. During the battles, many members of the Tekken Force defect and Lars leads the coup d'état, forming the rebel force Yggdrasil, where he is the leader of the alpha squad. In the campaign mode in the console versions of Tekken 6, Lars loses his men and memory and is joined by a robot named Alisa Bosconovitch on journey. Lars' memory is restored upon encountering his father Heihachi Mishima, at which point he also rediscovers his purpose: to stop Jin and prevent both Kazuya and Heihachi from taking over Zaibatsu. He resumes his role as the leader of Yggdrasil and infiltrates G Corporation, eventually reaching the Mishima Zaibatsu headquarters himself and encountering his half-nephew, Jin. Before he can fight Jin, his half-nephew reveals that Alisa was his spy who opposes him. Teaming with United Nations' agent Raven, Lars pursues a fleeing Jin and is forced to damage Alisa. As Jin lost to Lars, he explains he caused the war to awaken and defeat Azazel, and erase his Devil Gene. Following Jin's fight with Azazel, Lars brings the disabled Alisa to adoptive brother Lee Chaolan, who offers to restore her.

In the story mode of Tekken 7, Lars finds Jin in a Middle East market and rescues him from the pursuing U.N. army. He brings him to Lee and Alisa to treat them, revealing he needs him to defeat Kazuya. This is followed in Tekken 8, where Lars and his allies lead humanity's resistances left against Kazuya's tyranny. Despite Jin's defeat against Kazuya, Lars and his friends take Jin to Yakushima. Lars is defeated by Kazuya but is saved by Jin who manages to control his cursed power to defeat Kazuya. Following the war's ending, Yggdrasil is seen working for society. The downloadable content "Unforgotten Echoes" also features a prequel where Lars welcomes Eddy Gordo into his forces to join their cause and defeat G Corp.

Lars' role in Tekken 6 is also briefly shown in the manga Tekken Comic, and the novel Tekken: The Dark History of Mishima;. the novel is set before the game where Lars was still working for Jin's zaibatsu before he started the global chaos. Lars protects a comatose Jin from enemies most notably Kazuya. After recovering, Jin interrupts the battle between Lars and Kazuya. While Jin defeats Kazuya, Lars defeats Heihachi. Seeing Lars' victory, Jin wonders if Lars is also a Mishima and the two leave.

Although Lars does not appear in the film Tekken: Blood Vengeance Namco had plan to originally had the plot of the movie inspired by the first scene of the Scenario Campaign where Lars leads Yggdrasil in an attack against the Mishima Zaibatsu. While writer Dai Satō believed such idea was faithful to the franchise, he revised it in order to write a new story that would attract more newcomers to the movie. Lars also appears in the spinoff games Tekken Tag Tournament 2, Tekken 3D: Prime Edition, and Tekken Revolution. While none of these games have a story, Lars' ending in Tag Tournament 2 features a dream sequence where he is at a meal with all of his relatives, but fails to eat anything.

=== Other appearances ===
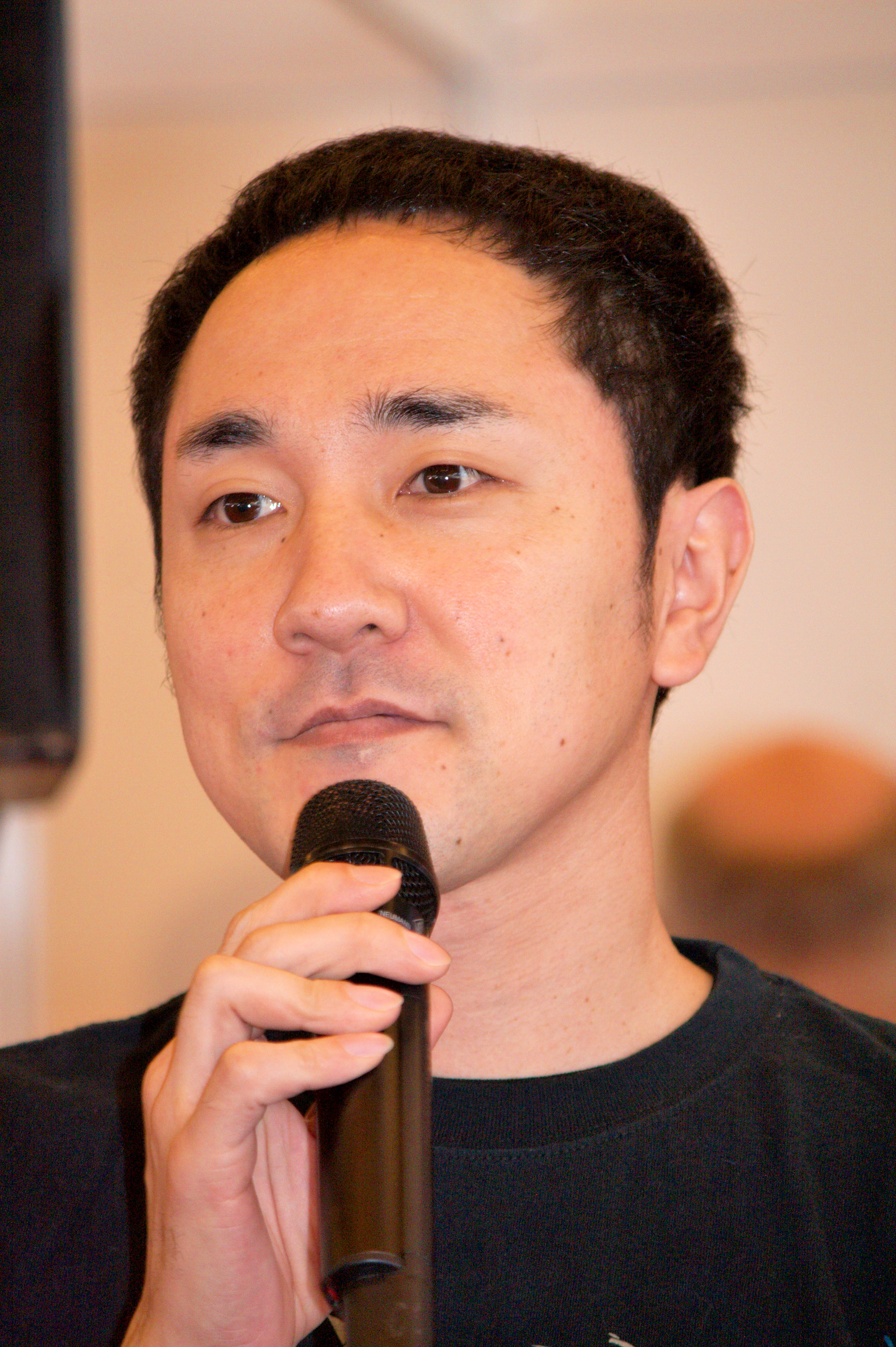
Positive response to Lars' redesign by Masashi Kishimoto led to CyberConnect2 CEO Hiroshi Matsuyama to include him in Ultimate Ninja Storm 2.

Outside the Tekken franchise, Lars is also featured as a playable character in the fighting game Naruto Shippuden: Ultimate Ninja Storm 2, featuring his alternate Tekken 6 costume designed by Naruto creator Masashi Kishimoto. He also appears as a playable downloadable content character in the crossover game Street Fighter X Tekken, with his official tag partner, Alisa. In the game's story mode, the duo join forces to destroy Pandora's Box, and thus stop the wars between factions that are fighting for it. In the 2013 update to the game, Lars was among the characters that were modified extensively. Lars also appeared in CyberConnect2's tactical role-playing game Full Bokko Heroes X in his Tekken 7 design, but with a super deformed look.

Lars' inclusion in Naruto Shippuden: Ultimate Ninja Storm 2 was initially conceived of by CyberConnect2 CEO Hiroshi Matsuyama. In 2009, Matsuyama read in a Weekly Shōnen Jump magazine that Lars' third costume had been designed by Kishimoto and thought he should be included in Ultimate Ninja Storm 2. As a result, Matsuyama approached Tekken 6 producer Suguru Sasaki and his team and asked them to include Lars in the game using Kishimoto's outfit. Once this was approved, the Tekken staff started assisting CyberConnect2 to adjust Lars' moves to fit the other characters in the Naruto game. When the work was concluded, Matsuyama was surprised at how well Lars fitted in with the game's cast.

Lars' appearance from Tekken 7 was also used as downloadable content for the fighting game Virtua Fighter 5.

== Reception ==
=== Promotion and merchandise ===
On his Twitter account, Harada has often been asked by gamers to increase Lars' strength, which resulted in an internet meme titled "Buff Lars"; Harada refused to do it. A Tanahashi shirt which the wrestler wears during promotion of Tekken 7 in late 2017 was used as merchandising. At the MCM London Comic Con 2009, a Tekken 6 player named Eliot Smith-Walters was awarded the Guinness World Record for the longest winning streak in Tekken 6, by winning 68 consecutive matches, playing mainly Lars. In promoting Tekken 6, Namco released multiple posters featuring him. The character has also been popular with cosplayers; most notably, in 2012 a Brazilian duo won an award at the 2012 World Cosplay Summit for cosplaying as Lars and Alisa. Additionally, Lars appears in a Tekken 7 trailer recruiting guest character Noctis Lucis Caelum from Final Fantasy XV for an unknown mission. The reason for both Lars and Noctis being friends is that one of Noctis' moves was based on Lars'. For the Tekken 7 crossover, Rock Paper Shotgun found Lars' relationship with Final Fantasy character Noctis hilarious and unbelievable due to this crossover of the two fishing together in marketing the Final Fantasy character.

=== Critical response ===
Critical reception to Lars has been mixed. IGN noted that the accessories that players can unlock for Lars were designed to make him more likable, reinforcing how appealing his character becomes across the game. Meristation referred to him as one of the most charismatic fighters presented in the franchise to the point of being one of his favorites. GamesRadar+ highly praised Lars' heroic characterization in contrast with the antagonists in Tekken like Jin and Kazuya. SNK character designer Falcoon said he enjoyed both his gameplay style due to the combos he can perform as well as his alternate civil clothing, most notably due to his gloves. He was compared him favorably to Mortal Kombat's newer protagonists at the time, like Shujinko or Taven, who he felt were less appealing than previous leads, while finding his alliance with Lee Chaolan innovative than the rest Mishima. VG247's reviewer enjoyed Lars' fights in Tekken 7's story mode against multiple armed guards despite how ridiculous he found it. On the other hand, Jeff Gerstmann from GiantBomb considered his actions "pretty dull," and concluded that his inclusion in the leading role in the story mode was "sloppy". In the book The Language of Gaming, writer Astrid Ensslin commented that Lars had been criticized mostly by Western audiences because of the way his role in the Scenario Campaign mode is presented. 1UP.com also praised Lars' moves, mentioning their balance between speed and strength. Both 1UP and IGN AU considered his appearance ridiculous, comparing him with Final Fantasy protagonists, despite his integral role in the story.

Anime News Network liked the alternate costume Kishimoto made for Lars, calling it "one of the more stylish Naruto super-ninja". Siliconera found it similar to that of the Akatsuki, the series' antagonists. Lars' addition to Naruto Shippuden: Ultimate Ninja Storm 2 has received mostly positive comments. Kotaku's Mike Fahey liked it, as it helped to expand the game's roster, but thought other characters from the Tekken series would be more suitable than Lars. Destructoid said that Tekken fans might be interested in playing Ultimate Ninja Storm 2 based on Lars' inclusion in the game. The Spanish developers of Storm 2 were surprised when learning that Lars would appear in the game of that as the announcement was made late during the game's development, noting that at the same time they reunited with Katsuhiro Harada a month earlier.

Response to Lars' Tekken 8 persona was good. Comic Book Resources highlighted the relationship Lars has with his nephew Jin as both comes across as foils ever since they meet as enemies in Tekken 6, they instead share similar feelings in Tekken 8 when it comes to their hatred of the cursed bloodline Kazuya has and are able ignore their differences and join forces for a greater cause in Tekken 8 during the fight against Kazuya. His new friendly relationship with Jin was praised by Isaiah Colbert of Kotaku for contrasting other Mishima fighters and comparing them to the dynamic of Ryu and Ken Masters from Street Fighter. Multiple writers enjoyed the new techniques Lars performed, positively comparing his Rage art, Zeus Unlimited (ゼウス・アンリミテッド), to Sasuke Uchiha's lightning based Chidori move from the Naruto series especially in cinematics. TheGamer noticed that Alisa appeared to have romantic feelings towards Lars as hinted in cinematics. The same site and Comic Book Resources enjoyed his fight against Kazuya in the scenario mode as Lars evokes the strength of Heihachi when facing his half-brother.

== See also ==
- List of Tekken characters
