= Zak Baney =

- Also known as: Zak Baney, Zak B, Zack Baney, Ralph B, Ralphy B
- Born: Ralph Edward Baney III; June 3, 1973 (age 53); Jordan
- Origin: Florida, Japan
- Genres: Electronic, Electro, Downtempo, Acid jazz, New wave, House, Breakbeat, Hip hop, Pop
- Occupations: Film director, Film producer, Screenwriter, Photographer, Editor, Record producer, Songwriter, DJ, Composer, Mixer, Mastering engineer
- Instruments: Turntables, Synthesizers, Drum machines, Mixers, Sequencers, Samplers
- Years active: 1986–present
- Labels: Locked Groove, Dubtone, Chicago Rhythm Style, ffrr, Nu Futura
- Member of: Beat Persuasion
- Website: zakbaney.com

Ralph Baney, Jr. (born June 3, 1973), better known by the name Zak Baney, is a record producer, songwriter, screenwriter, filmmaker and photographer. He is known for originating a genre of techno music called acid breaks in 1987, which combined elements of Chicago's acid sound with South Florida's breakbeat style. Also was at the forefront of the Miami bass scene, making low bass frequency recordings for car bass competitions. In addition, is known for his filmmaking-besides making many commercials and music videos, he directed two films that had their premieres at the Cannes Film Festival.

== Early life and influences ==
Ralph Baney, Jr. was born in Jordan to Julia and Ralph Baney, the famed marine biologist, diver, author, and Baptist minister and lived in Jerusalem until the age of eight when they moved to southern Florida. His first musical memories were of his father playing the piano at home in Jerusalem and listening to Elvis Presley and Frank Sinatra recordings. Another pivotal musical awakening was in America hearing Pink Floyd's The Wall playing from a neighbor's boombox.

Sometime later, his mother gave him a turntable and two records-Michael Jackson's Thriller and Newcleus's "Jam On It" and it was the latter that he listened to repeatedly every day after school until the grooves in the vinyl wore out entirely; ironically, years later, he was offered the opportunity to officially remix "Jam On It" by Cosmo D.

== Production years ==
Zak Baney was introduced to acid house music by DJ Sammy Rock, who mentored and educated him on the production side of music as well as often lending him his Ensoniq Mirage sampler. Saving his money, he eventually bought his first piece of gear, Roland TR-808 drum machine and later convinced Sammy to sell him his Roland TB-303. Under his guidance, Zak learned to shape his music and began fusing the sound of Chicago's acid house style with Miami's early electro beats and soon came up with his first track entitled "Acid Breaks", which was considered the first example of the new genre.

== Post acid house ==
After 'white label' pressings, Zak moved on to the world of car bass competitions, which initially started as a fun project for his friends involved in the sub-culture. He would produce low-frequency tapes for them to be used in competition and those very same tapes were soon bootlegged and passed around from one contest to another, eventually making their way to local DJs and producers, helping to create another genre, Miami Bass.

Not long after, he signed onto Chicago's Rhythm Style label, then FFRR and Frankie Bones' label, Nu Futura. He then started his very own labels, Dubtone Records and Locked Groove Records, respectively. This led to many other opportunities, including producing music and sound design for ESPN and The Discovery Channel. He also was part of the crew that opened and started House of Night at the popular Ybor City club, Prana.

== Visual mediums ==
In 2001, Zak moved to Japan to produce for Japanese artists and started Dubtone Records in 2004. In 2006, he ventured into directing music videos and television ads, most notably for Adidas Japan. He won several awards for his music and video work, including Japanzine's 2009 and 2010 top ten best video award for his work with his group Beat Persuasion (Your Touch) and the duo SGF-1 (Castor Sugar), as well as Japanzine's 2010 top ten award for best song for the former group (Your Touch).

He then went on to write and direct, along with Minha Kim, the searing docudrama Last Message in 2011. After holding several screenings of the film to raise money for the victims of the Tohoku tsunami, it was accepted and showcased at the Cannes Film Festival in 2013. Two years later, he wrote and directed the drama Kyodai, starring Yumiko Katayama and co-produced by Yuko Tanaka. This too was accepted and showcased at the Cannes Film Festival in 2015, making Zak Baney the only foreign director in Japan to have two separate films featured there. In 2016, his video for recording artist Costie Payne's song, "Grace And Love", won the top prize of best music video of the year at the LRT Music Video Awards.

== Discography ==
Zak Baney produced and remixed music for the following artists:

- Nucleus
- Afrika Bambaataa
- Man Parrish
- Norman Iceberg
- Ladytron
- Nitzer Ebb
- The Dark Esquire
- The Sweeps
- Visitor
- Makoto Togo
- 1.K.G
- Z-Machine Labs
- Beat Persuasion
- Spruill & Baney
- Cavaricci
- Sabastian Thomas
- Nuvolt
- Boys Code

== See also ==
- Techno
