= Le Click =

German Eurodance duo

- Origin: Frankfurt, Germany
- Genres: Eurodance
- Years active: 1993–1998
- Label: Logic Records
- Past members: Kayo Shekoni; Robert Haynes; Melanie Thornton †; Mikey Romeo

Le Click was a German Eurodance duo. It consisted of Swedish-Nigerian singer Kayo Shekoni and rapper-singer Robert Haynes.

== History ==
Their US chart debut was in 1995 with "Tonight Is the Night" (which featured La Bouche's Melanie Thornton on vocals and was included on the double platinum-selling U.S. edition of La Bouche's debut album Sweet Dreams). They had another hit in 1997 with the single "Call Me", which climbed to number 35 on the Billboard Hot 100 as well as number 4 on the Billboard Hot Dance Club Play chart. The track reached number 38 in the UK Singles Chart. Its follow-up, "Don't Go" peaked at number 62 on the Billboard Hot 100 and number 19 on the Billboard Dance Club Play Chart. Their album, Tonight Is the Night peaked at number 49 on the Heatseekers chart.

The lead singer Shekoni was already an established artist in her native Sweden, and has since gone on to have a successful television career. She has released two solo albums and many hit singles in Sweden, both in either English or Swedish. In 1998, she released the single "If I Can't Have You" with LFO. Shekoni was the Swedish Eurovision Song Contest 2002 entrant with the group Afro-dite. Her most recent English single was released in 2006 on Redlox Music titled, "(If It Makes You) Feel Good". In 2007 on iTunes released 3-track EP, under the brand 'Le Click' titled Let's Click'. These are 3 tracks recording sessions from the "S.O.S." and "A Moment of Love" album of La Bouche that did not make the final cut.

== Discography ==
=== Studio albums ===
Title	Details	Peak chart positions	
Title	Details	GER	US Heat
Tonight Is the Night	Release date: July 29, 1997; Label: RCA; Formats: CD	95	49

=== Singles ===
Year	Single	Peak chart positions				Album
Year	Single	US	US Dance	CAN Dance	UK	Album
1995	"Tonight Is the Night"	68	22	4	—	Tonight Is the Night
1997	"Call Me"	35	4	1	38	Tonight Is the Night
1997	"Don't Go"	62	19	4	—	Tonight Is the Night
1997	"Heaven's Got to Be Better"	—	—	—	—	Tonight Is the Night
"—" denotes releases that did not chart

=== Music video ===
Year	Single	Director
1995	"Tonight Is the Night"	
1997	"Call Me"	Thomas Job
1997	"Don't Go"	Jesse Vaughn
