= Call Me (Le Click song) =

Single by Le Click

from the album Tonight is the Night
- Released: February 3, 1997
- Recorded: 1996
- Length: 3:48
- Label: RCA
- Songwriters: Robert Haynes; Nosie Katzmann; Misar; G.A. Saraf; Uwe Wagenknecht
- Producers: Misar; G.A. Saraf

Le Click singles chronology
"Tonight is the Night" (1995)	"Call Me" (1997)	"Don't Go" (1997)

Music video
- "Call Me" on YouTube

"Call Me" is a song recorded by German Eurodance duo Le Click. The song was released in February 1997, by RCA Records, as the second single from their debut album, Tonight is the Night (1997). It peaked at number 35 in the United States and number 38 in the United Kingdom. The song also reached number-one on the RPM Dance chart in Canada and stayed there for three weeks. The accompanying music video was directed by Thomas Job and premiered in March 1997. Shawnee Smith of Billboard magazine reviewed the song favorably, saying that singer Kayo Shekoni "oozes the right balance of pep and diva bombasity, while rapper Robert Haynes has his party chatter down pat."

== Track listings ==
- CD maxi-single, Germany (1997)
1. "Call Me" (Radio Edit) — 3:45
2. "Call Me" (Dance Mix) — 6:35
3. "Call Me" (UK Airplay Mix) — 3:54
4. "Call Me" (UK Club Dub) — 5:15
5. "The Call" — 5:52
- CD maxi-single (New Mixes), Germany (1997)
1. "Call Me" (Main Radio Edit) — 3:50
2. "Call Me" (Radio Mix) — 3:44
3. "Call Me" (Junior Vasquez Mix) — 3:57
4. "Call Me" (Spike Me Club Mix) — 8:31
- CD maxi-single, US (1997)
1. "Call Me" (Euro Radio Mix (No Rap)) — 3:44
2. "Call Me" (Euro Radio Mix (Rap)) — 3:44
3. "Call Me" (Junior's Main Mix) — 7:07
4. "Call Me" (Spike Me Club Mix) — 8:30
5. "Call Me" (Spike Dub) — 8:00
6. "Tonight Is the Night" — 3:58

== Charts ==
=== Weekly charts ===
Chart (1997)	Peak position
Canada Dance/Urban (RPM)	1
Scotland Singles (OCC)	37
UK Singles (OCC)	38
UK Dance (OCC)	33
US Billboard Hot 100	35
US Hot Dance Club Play (Billboard)	4

=== Year-end charts ===
Chart (1997)	Position
Canada Dance/Urban (RPM)	14
