= Overworld (band) =

Metal band from Sweden

- Origin: Stockholm, Sweden
- Genres: Alternative metal
- Years active: 2012–present
- Labels: One Management (2015)
- Members: Andie Overworld; Kaz Overworld; Olli Overworld; Kriss Overworld; Anton Overworld
- Past members: Endigo Overworld; Nikke Overworld; Lynx Overworld

Overworld is an alternative metal band from Sweden, formed in 2011 in Stockholm. The band is composed of guitarists Nikke and Kaz, bassist Lynx and the drummer Andie. Despite the band being young and newly formed, its members are not new to the scene, having previously played in other Swedish underground acts. They play a type of music self-titled as "adrenaline rock 'n' roll metal".

The band's name originates from a drunken conversation between Kaz and Andie about taking over the world, a phrase which was shortened to become "Overworld".

== Debut EP (2012) ==
The band's debut EP, called "Perfect Anomaly", was released digitally on 25 May 2012 worldwide, rising quickly to the top of the Swedish iTunes, charts at # 12 on every album and # 5 in Rock. This is made even more interesting by the fact that the EP is entirely self-released, as the band has not yet signed a contract with any label.

== The Singles (2013) ==
On 22 September the music video for the song "Until We're Dead" got 7,000 views in just one week that was released on YouTube.

A single called "My Reality" was released on 1 June 2013, along with its music video, directed by 11frames. Reached 12,000 views on YouTube in less than a week this time, and was ranked # 57 on Digilistan and # 3 on the iTunes Rock.

== Festival ==
The band played at the Sweden Rock Festival, one of the biggest festivals in the world of Rock / Metal.

== Members ==
=== Current members ===
- Kaz – Guitar (2011–present)
- Andie – Drums (2011–present)
- Olli – Vocals (2015–present)
- Anton – Guitar (2015–present)
- Matt – Bass Guitar (2017)

=== Past members ===
- Endigo – Vocals (2011–2014)
- Nikke – Guitar (2011–2015)
- Lynx – Bass Guitar ( 2012–2015)
- Kriss – Bass Guitar (2015–2016)

== Discography ==
- Perfect Anomaly (2011)
- Bring Down The Sky (2014)
- RE: Anomaly (2014)
