= Kate Sikora =

- Born: September 5, 1980
- Origin: New Jersey
- Genres: Indie rock alternative rock
- Years active: 2005–present
- Labels: Phantom Signals; Contrarede
- Formerly of: The Loyal We
- Website: katesikora.com

Kate Sikora is an American singer songwriter from New Jersey living in Japan.

Sikora released her debut album Grace in Rotation in America in 2005. Shortly afterwards, Sikora was discovered on Myspace by Japanese indie rockers Apartment and invited to perform in Japan, initiating a love affair with the country. After permanently settling in Tokyo, she joined forces with Lindsay Lueders to form The Loyal We. Their indie folk music caught the attention of Japanese record label Contrarede and they released their debut album Homes in January 2010.

Only a few months before, in September 2009, Sikora's solo album Grace in Rotation had been rereleased in Japan on the same label. The album drew comparisons to the music of Kristin Hersh, Sheryl Crow and Liz Phair, but other artists known to have inspired Sikora include Cat Power and 90's American indie band Neutral Milk Hotel . The album received positive reviews in Japan and she became the first female foreign musician to perform on the Rookie a Go Go Stage at the Fuji Rock Festival.

Soon after she began working with Glaswegian producer David Naughton and in December 2010 she released Aparto on Phantom Signals Records. The EP went on to form the basis of her second album, Just Enough Space. The album was released in November 2012 by Japanese indie label And Records, and included notable performances from British instrumentalist Nick Duffy, Japanese bassist Takeshi Horikoshi (OCEANLANE, Olde Worlde), and drummer Yoshinari Kishida, who performs with Shugo Tokumaru. Sikora's other musical collaborators include fellow Tokyo-based indie musicians, The Watanabes, for whom she appeared as a guest vocalist on their second album, You're Dancing I'm Absorbed.

Sikora is based in Japan but also often returns to New York, where she has shared the stage with artists such as Liz Phair and Gabby Young.

== Releases ==
- Grace in Rotation
- Aparto
- Just Enough Space
- The Days We Hold On to
