= Charisma Man =

Comic strip in Japan

Charisma Man (カリスママン, Karisuma Man) is a comic strip that first appeared in the February 1998 issue of The Alien (later known as Japanzine), a monthly magazine for expatriates in Japan.

Larry Rodney created the strip and wrote the first eleven installments, which were illustrated by Glen Schroeder. In January 1998, after Rodney left Japan, Neil Garscadden assumed writing responsibilities while Wayne Wilson illustrated. From 2002, Garscadden handed it to another writer, Wayne Wilson. The strip was discontinued in 2006, but in 2009, Rodney and Garscadden announced plans to team up and compile a book of previous strips with new installments.

== Concept ==
"Charisma Man" manipulates the superhero genre to ridicule the often unjustified self–confidence of some foreign men in Japan. Although something of a loser in his home country Canada—the home of Charisma Man's creator—when around Japanese people the central character transforms from a skinny nerd into a muscle-bound hunk, extremely attractive to women and admired by men. Like other superheroes, however, Charisma Man has one major weakness: "Western Woman". Whenever in the presence of western females his powers disappear and he becomes an unattractive, skinny wimp once more.

"Charisma Man" is thus a statement on the relationships between Japanese and non-Japanese in Japan. According to Rodney:

"The Japanese seem to see Westerners through some kind of filter. An obvious example was all the geeks I saw out there walking around with beautiful Japanese girls on their arms. These guys were probably social misfits in their home countries, but in Japan the geek factor didn't seem to translate.

"The dichotomy between the perception of these guys in their home countries and in Japan was amazing to me. This made me think of Superman; on his home planet of Krypton, Superman was nobody special, and he certainly didn't have superpowers. But when he arrived on earth -- well, you know the rest.

"He was somebody -- that was the whole premise of the first strip."

— Larry Rodney, in a 2003 interview with the Japan Times

== See also ==
- Gaijin
- Ethnocentrism
- Asian fetish
