= Drag Race Sverige =

Swedish television series

- Genre: Reality competition
- Based on: RuPaul's Drag Race
- Presented by: Robert Fux
- Judges: Robert Fux; Kayo; Farao Groth
- Ending theme: "Rock It (To the Moon)"
- Country of origin: Sweden
- No. of episodes: 8

Production
- Executive producers: RuPaul Charles; Tom Campbell; Fenton Bailey; Randy Barbato
- Production company: Mastiff AB

Original release
- Network: SVT1 and SVT Play (Sweden); WOW Presents Plus (International)
- Release: March 4, 2023 – present

Related
- Drag Race franchise

Drag Race Sverige (internationally called Drag Race Sweden) is a Swedish reality competition television series based on the American series RuPaul's Drag Race. It is broadcast by SVT1 and SVT Play in Sweden and airs on WOW Presents Plus elsewhere.

Drag Race Sverige is the twelfth international adaptation of the American reality competition series RuPaul's Drag Race, following Chilean, Thai, British, Canadian, Dutch, Australian and New Zealand, Spanish, Italian, French, Filipino, and Belgian versions. It has been followed by Mexican, Brazilian, and German iterations.

The adaptation was announced in April 2022 and casting began in May. Mastiff AB produces the show. Executive producers are RuPaul and Tom Campbell, as well as World of Wonder founders Fenton Bailey and Randy Barbato. The show is presented by Robert Fux with singer and actress Kayo and radio and television host Farao Groth making up the judging panel. The first season premiered March 4, 2023 and was won by Admira Thunderpussy, with Fontana as the runner-up.

== Contestants ==
Ages, names, and cities stated are at time of filming.

Contestants of Drag Race Sverige and their backgrounds
Contestant	Age	Hometown	Outcome
Admira Thunderpussy	29	Stockholm, Stockholm County	Winner
Fontana	30	São Leopoldo, Brazil	Runner-up
Vanity Vain	31	Linköping, Östergötland County	3rd place
Elecktra	36	Helsingborg, Skåne County	4th place
Antonina Nutshell	29	Liverpool, United Kingdom	5th place (Note: Antonina Nutshell originally placed eighth, but re-entered the competition and ultimately placed fifth.)
Santana Sexmachine	30	Berlin, Germany	6th place
Imaa Queen	30	Värnamo, Jönköping County	7th place
Endigo	30	Tokyo, Japan	8th place
Almighty Aphroditey	21	Mora, Dalarna County	9th place

== Contestants progress ==
Legend:

Admira Thunderpussy won Drag Race Sverige.
Fontana was the runner-up.
WIN indicates that the contestant won the challenge.
SAFE indicates that the contestant was declared safe by the judges.
BTM (Bottom) indicates that the contestant was up for elimination.
ELIM (Eliminated) indicates that the contestant was eliminated.
LOSS indicates that the contestant did not win the Reading Challenge and did not re-enter the competition.
Guest indicates that the contestant returned as a guest.

Contestants progress with placements in each episode
Contestant	Episode							
Contestant	1	2	3	4	5	6	7	8
Admira Thunderpussy	SAFE	SAFE	SAFE	WIN	WIN	SAFE	WIN	Winner
Fontana	SAFE	SAFE	SAFE	SAFE	BTM	WIN	SAFE	Runner-up
Vanity Vain	SAFE	BTM	WIN	SAFE	SAFE	SAFE	BTM	Eliminated
Elecktra	SAFE	WIN	BTM	SAFE	SAFE	BTM	ELIM	Guest
Antonina Nutshell	SAFE	ELIM		BTM	SAFE	ELIM		Guest
Santana Sexmachine	SAFE	SAFE	SAFE	SAFE	ELIM			Guest
Imaa Queen	WIN	SAFE	SAFE	ELIM				Guest
Endigo	BTM	SAFE	ELIM	LOSS				Guest
Almighty Aphroditey	ELIM			LOSS				Guest

== Lip syncs ==
Legend:

The contestant was eliminated after their first time in the bottom.
The contestant was eliminated after their second time in the bottom.
The contestant was eliminated after their third time in the bottom.

Episode	Contestants			Song	Eliminated
1	Almighty Aphroditey	vs.	Endigo	"Puss & Kram" (Daniela Rathana)	Almighty Aphroditey
2	Antonina Nutshell	vs.	Vanity Vain	"Jazzbacillen" (Siw Malmkvist)	Antonina Nutshell
3	Elecktra	vs.	Endigo	"Sexual Revolution" (Army of Lovers)	Endigo
4	Antonina Nutshell	vs.	Imaa Queen	"Kitty Girl" (RuPaul)	Imaa Queen
5	Fontana	vs.	Santana Sexmachine	"Euphoria" (Loreen)	Santana Sexmachine
6	Antonina Nutshell	vs.	Elecktra	"Emergency" (Icona Pop)	Antonina Nutshell
7	Elecktra	vs.	Vanity Vain	"Kisses of Fire" (ABBA)	Elecktra

== Guest judges ==
Listed in chronological order:

- Daniela Rathana, singer
- Siw Malmkvist, singer
- Tone Sekelius, singer
- Christer Lindarw, drag performer
- Fredrik Robertsson, fashion designer
- Arantxa Alvarez, television presenter and singer
- Omar Rudberg, singer and actor
- Loreen, singer and two-time Eurovision Song Contest winner
- Caroline Hjelt, singer and member of musical duo Icona Pop
- Shima Niavarani, singer and actress

=== Special guests ===
Guests who appeared in episodes, but did not judge on the main stage.

Episode 1

- Peter Knutson, photographer

Episode 5

- Herman Gardarfve, songwriter and record producer
- Melanie Wehbe, singer
- Patrik Jean, singer

Episode 6

- Anthony Yigit, professional boxer
- Robert Eirfjell, chief technology officer
- Robin Bengtsson, singer
- Niklas Andersson, comedian
- Simon Sköld, professional mixed martial artist

Episode 8

- Benjamin Johnsson, choreographer
- Herman Gardarfve, songwriter and record producer
- Melanie Wehbe, singer
- Patrik Jean, singer

== Episodes ==
No. in season	Title	Original release date
1	"Start Your Engines!" "Tävlande, växla upp!"	4 March 2023
Nine queens enter the workroom. For the first mini challenge, the queens do a Midsommar photoshoot. Elecktra wins the mini-challenge. For the main challenge, the queens present two looks on the runway: Hembygdsdrottning (Hometown Queen) and En Natt På Slottet (A Night at the Castle). On the runway, Admira Thunderpussy, Imaa Queen and Santana Sexmachine receive positive critiques, with Imaa Queen winning the challenge. Almighty Aphroditey, Antonina Nutshell and Endigo receive negative critiques, with Antonina Nutshell being safe. Almighty Aphroditey and Endigo lip-sync to "Puss & Kram" by Daniela Rathana. Endigo wins the lip-sync and Almighty Aphroditey is the first queen to sashay away.: Guest Judge: Daniela Rathana; Mini-Challenge: Midsommar photoshoot; Mini-Challenge Winner: Elecktra; Mini-Challenge Prize: Immunity from elimination; Main Challenge: Present two looks on the runway; Runway Themes: Hembygdsdrottning (Hometown Queen) and En Natt På Slottet (A Night at the Castle); Challenge Winner: Imaa Queen; Bottom Two: Almighty Aphroditey and Endigo; Lip-Sync Song: "Puss & Kram" by Daniela Rathana; Eliminated: Almighty Aphroditey; Farewell Message: "OLYMPU$$Y, Sverige... Sen världen Aphroditey" ("OLYMPU$$Y, Sweden... Then the world Aphroditey")
2	"MARATHON Talent Hunt" "MARAton-talangjakt"	11 March 2023
For this week's mini-challenge, the queens apply drag makeup in the dark. Fontana wins the mini-challenge. For the main challenge, the queens perform in the C-U-N-Talent Show.: Admira Thunderpussy - Live singing; Antonina Nutshell - Spoken word; Elecktra - Live singing; Endigo - Live singing and electric guitar playing; Fontana - Latin dance; Imaa Queen - Live singing; Santana Sexmachine - Pole dancing; Vanity Vain - Performance art; On the runway, category is Långstrump Extravaganza (Longstocking Extravaganza). Elecktra, Imaa Queen and Santana Sexmachine receive positive critiques, with Elecktra winning the challenge. Antonina Nutshell, Endigo and Vanity Vain receive negative critiques, with Endigo being safe. Antonina Nutshell and Vanity Vain lip-sync to "Jazzbacillen" by Siw Malmkvist. Vanity Vain wins the lip-sync and Antonina Nutshell sashays away.: Guest Judges: Siw Malmkvist and Tone Sekelius; Mini-Challenge: Apply drag makeup in the dark; Mini-Challenge Winner: Fontana; Main Challenge: Perform in the C-U-N-Talent Show; Runway Theme: Långstrump Extravaganza (Longstocking Extravaganza); Challenge Winner: Elecktra; Bottom Two: Antonina Nutshell and Vanity Vain; Lip-Sync Song: "Jazzbacillen" by Siw Malmkvist; Eliminated: Antonina Nutshell; Farewell Message: "Men va fa-an! Från Norrland till UK till Världen. Älskar er alla. Antonina Nutshell" ("But god damn it! From Norrland to the UK to the World. Love you all. Antonina Nutshell")
3	"Drag-a'-mera!" "Drag-a-mera"	18 March 2023
For this week's mini-challenge, the queens take a quiz about Swedish drag. Endigo wins the mini-challenge. For the main challenge, the queens create an avant-garde outfit made from recycled materials. On the runway, category is Greta's Tip Top Couture. Imaa Queen, Vanity Vain and Fontana receive positive critiques, with Vanity Vain winning the challenge. Elecktra and Endigo receive negative critiques. Elecktra and Endigo lip-sync to "Sexual Revolution" by Army of Lovers. Elecktra wins the lip-sync and Endigo sashays away.: Guest Judges: Christer Lindarw and Fredrik Robertsson; Mini-Challenge: Swedish drag quiz; Mini-Challenge Winner: Endigo; Main Challenge: Create an avant-garde outfit made from recycled materials; Runway Theme: Greta's Tip Top Couture; Challenge Winner: Vanity Vain; Bottom Two: Elecktra and Endigo; Lip-Sync Song: "Sexual Revolution" by Army of Lovers; Eliminated: Endigo; Farewell Message: "Tack för allt tjejor - See you in Tokyo! また東京で会いましょう！ Elecktra... Unna dig att sudda! Hahahaha! XD" ("Thanks for everything girlies - See you in Tokyo! Let's meet in Tokyo again! Elecktra... Allow yourself to erase! Hahahaha! XD")
4	"Snatch Game" "Parningsleken"	25 March 2023
For this week's mini-challenge, the queens read each other to filth. In a twist, Robert brings back the previous three eliminated queens to compete in the mini-challenge, for a chance to return to the competition. Antonina Nutshell wins the mini-challenge and, as a prize, returns to the competition. For the main challenge, the queens play the Snatch Game. Arantxa Alvarez and Omar Rudberg star as the celebrity contestants. The cast consisted of: Admira Thunderpussy as Anita Ekberg; Antonina Nutshell as Sandra Dahlberg; Elecktra as Anna Anka; Fontana as Britney Spears; Imaa Queen as Carola; Santana Sexmachine as Gunilla Persson; Vanity Vain as Anna Book; On the runway, category is Mitt liv som guldflicka (My Life as a Golden Girl). Admira Thunderpussy and Elecktra receive positive critiques, with Admira Thunderpussy winning the challenge. Antonina Nutshell, Imaa Queen and Vanity Vain receive negative critiques, with Vanity Vain being safe. Antonina Nutshell and Imaa Queen lip-sync to "Kitty Girl" by RuPaul. Antonina Nutshell wins the lip-sync and Imaa Queen sashays away.: Guest Judges: Arantxa Alvarez and Omar Rudberg; Mini-Challenge: Reading is Fundamental; Mini-Challenge Winner: Antonina Nutshell; Returned: Antonina Nutshell; Main Challenge: Snatch Game; Runway Theme: Mitt liv som guldflicka (My Life as a Golden Girl); Challenge Winner: Admira Thunderpussy; Bottom Two: Antonina Nutshell and Imaa Queen; Lip-Sync Song: "Kitty Girl" by RuPaul; Eliminated: Imaa Queen; Farewell Message: "♡ Älskar er, alla underbara ♡ Jätteroligt att kladda. Lalalalalalala... Imaa" ("♡ Love you all, wonderful ones ♡ It's really fun to scribble. Lalalalalalala... Imaa")
5	"The Dragodi Festival" "Dragodifestivalen"	1 April 2023
For this week's mini-challenge, the queens try and sell different products from Melodifestivalen. Fontana wins the mini-challenge. For the main challenge, the queens write, record, and perform verses for The Drag Queen Song Contest.: Team Arjas Änglar (Arja's Angels): Admira Thunderpussy, Antonina Nutshell and Santana Sexmachine; Team Puderpuffarna (The Powderpuffs): Elecktra, Fontana and Vanity Vain; On the runway, category is Omvandling (Transformation). Admira Thunderpussy and Vanity Vain receive positive critiques, with Admira Thunderpussy winning the challenge. Antonina Nutshell, Fontana and Santana Sexmachine receive negative critiques, with Antonina Nutshell being safe. Fontana and Santana Sexmachine lip-sync to "Euphoria" by Loreen. Fontana wins the lip-sync and Santana Sexmachine sashays away.: Guest Judge: Loreen; Mini-Challenge: Sell products from Melodifestivalen; Mini-Challenge Winner: Fontana; Main Challenge: Write, record, and perform verses for The Drag Queen Song Contest; Runway Theme: Omvandling (Transformation); Challenge Winner: Admira Thunderpussy; Bottom Two: Fontana and Santana Sexmachine; Lip-Sync Song: "Euphoria" by Loreen; Eliminated: Santana Sexmachine; Farewell Message: "Tschüss" ("Bye")
6	"Dream Sisters" "Drömsystrar"	8 April 2023
For this week's mini-challenge, the queens try and seduce their way into a club. Elecktra wins the mini-challenge. For the main challenge, the queens makeover MMA fighter Simon Sköld and his macho gang of guys. On the runway, category is Dröm systrar (Dream Sisters). Fontana and Vanity Vain receive positive critiques, with Fontana winning the challenge. Admira Thunderpussy, Antonina Nutshell and Elecktra receive negative critiques, with Admira Thunderpussy being safe. Antonina Nutshell and Elecktra lip-sync to "Emergency" by Icona Pop. Elecktra wins the lip-sync and Antonina Nutshell sashays away.: Guest Judge: Caroline Hjelt; Mini-Challenge: Seduce your way into a club; Mini-Challenge Winner: Elecktra; Main Challenge: Makeover MMA fighter Simon Sköld and his macho gang of guys; Runway Theme: Dröm systrar (Dream Sisters); Challenge Winner: Fontana; Bottom Two: Antonina Nutshell and Elecktra; Lip-Sync Song: "Emergency" by Icona Pop; Eliminated: Antonina Nutshell; Farewell Message: "Men va fa-an...igen! Ni är magiska. /Antonina Nutshell ♡" ("But god damn it...again! You are magical./Antonina Nutshell ♡")
7	"Diva Assoluta" "Diva assoluta"	15 April 2023
For this week's main challenge, the queens act in a crime drama. On the runway, category is Drama drottning (Drama Queen). Admira Thunderpussy wins the challenge. Elecktra and Vanity Vain receive negative critiques, and are announced as the bottom two. They lip-sync to "Kisses of Fire" by ABBA. Vanity Vain wins the lip-sync and Elecktra sashays away.: Guest Judge: Shima Niavarani; Main Challenge: Act in a crime drama; Runway Theme: Drama drottning (Drama Queen); Challenge Winner: Admira Thunderpussy; Bottom Two: Elecktra and Vanity Vain; Lip-Sync Song: "Kisses of Fire" by ABBA; Eliminated: Elecktra; Farewell Message: "FY FAN VAD FATTIGT LÄPPSTIFT!!! Elecktra ♡" ("DAMN WHAT A TRASH LIPSTICK!!! Elecktra ♡")
8	"Grande Finale - Sverige Season 1" "Drottningen kröns"	22 April 2023
For this week's mini-challenge, the queens give a Nobel Prize acceptance speech. Admira Thunderpussy wins the mini-challenge. For the main challenge, the queens write, record and perform verses to Robert Fux and Kayo's song "Every Queen". On the runway, category is Drottning Delicious (Queen Delicious). The eliminated queens all return to the runway. Vanity Vain is eliminated, leaving Admira Thunderpussy and Fontana as the top two queens of the season. It is announced that Admira Thunderpussy is the winner, leaving Fontana as the runner-up.: Mini-Challenge: Give a Nobel Prize acceptance speech; Mini-Challenge Winner: Admira Thunderpussy; Main Challenge: Write, record and perform verses to Robert Fux and Kayo's song "Every Queen"; Runway Theme: Drottning Delicious (Queen Delicious); Eliminated: Vanity Vain; Top Two: Admira Thunderpussy and Fontana; Runner-up: Fontana; Winner of Drag Race Sverige Season One: Admira Thunderpussy

== Drag Race Sverige: Untucked! ==
On 19 October 2022, it was confirmed that the main season will have its own companion series called Drag Race Sverige: Untucked. This the second international iteration of the Untucked series, after Drag Race Philippines: Untucked!.
