= Japanzine =

Japan-based English-language magazine

- June 2010 cover
- Editor: Doug Breath
- Categories: Newsmagazine, Local interest magazine
- Frequency: Monthly
- Circulation: 52,000
- Publisher: Carter Witt
- First issue: April 1990 (as The Alien)
- Company: Carter Witt Media
- Country: Japan
- Language: English
- Website: japanzine.jp

Japanzine is a Japan-based English-language magazine, published by Carter Witt Media.

== History ==
Japanzine is the successor magazine to The Alien.

In May 2008 the magazine introduced Gaijin Sounds, a national music competition for foreign artists residing in Japan, created as an attempt to counteract the lack of press coverage given to "home-grown" artists. Twelve artists from around Japan were selected as winners with music ranging from techno to indie-pop to rap. Gaijin Sounds Vol. 2, was launched the following year, featuring in the May 2009 issue. The competition soon expanded to the live arena, with 2 live "finals" in Osaka and Tokyo in autumn 2009, featuring over 8 bands such as Fukuoka outfit, Nanbanjin; Tokyo-based Kev Gray & The Gravy Train - both who had won the award twice - and the former Matsuyama indie rock band The Watanabes, also based in Tokyo.

The competition returned in 2010, where winners included Andy Tyrone Rogers and The Mootekkis, who featured on the cover.

In 2012, Japanzine opened up the competition to all-Japanese line-ups with a national Bands of Japan contest.

Publications on Japanzine stopped, and Carter Witt and Doug Breath moved on to develop Nagoya Buzz.

== Description ==
Japanzine caters largely to the expatriate community in Japan. Each edition of the magazine contains a map of various Japanese cities and an entertainment guide, as well as several articles - both satirical and serious - on Japanese life.

The comic strip character Charisma Man first appeared in The Alien and later in Japanzine.

The magazine provided a regular gig guide for music lovers in Tokyo with a mix of international and up and coming local artists.
