= British Chamber of Commerce in Japan =

Non-profit trade organization

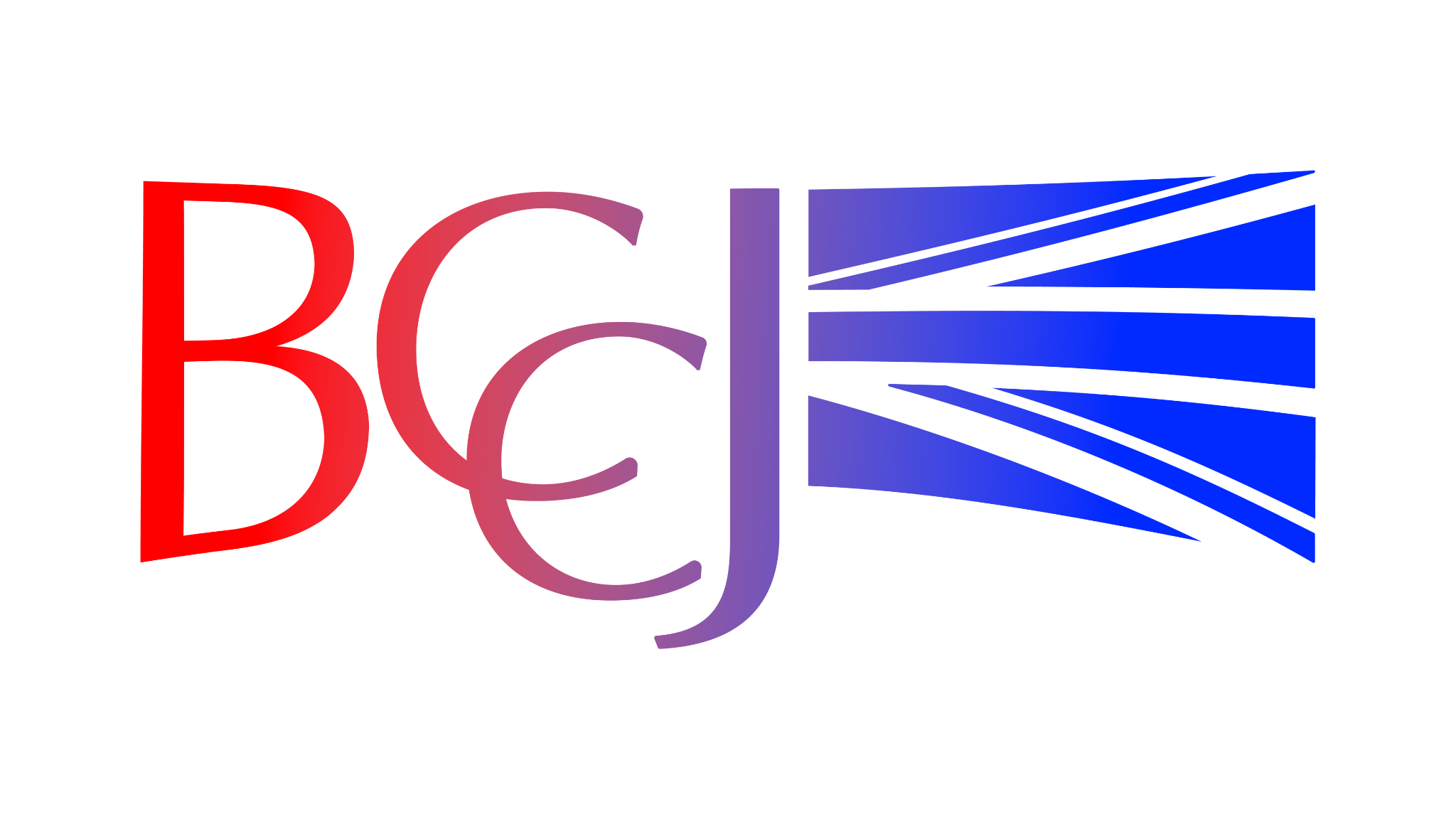
British Chamber of Commerce Japan BCCJ 2026 Logo
- Abbreviation: BCCJ
- Formation: 1948; 78 years ago
- Type: Chamber of Commerce
- Legal status: Non-Profit
- Purpose: Trade and Investment
- Headquarters: Tokyo, Japan
- Location: Japan
- President: Richard Lyle
- Main organ: Board of Governors
- Website: https://www.bccjapan.com/

The British Chamber of Commerce in Japan (BCCJ) is an independent non-profit organisation that promotes trade and aims to strengthen business ties between the UK and Japan. The BCCJ, established in 1948, is a private membership organisation serving over 3,700 high-calibre members, of which more than 230 are member companies across 40 sectors.

The BCCJ is open to members of all nationalities, and offers high-value events, productive networking and promotional opportunities, information services, and access to influential institutions and individuals. The Chamber's mission is to strengthen business ties between the UK and Japan, promote and support the business interests of all members, and actively encourage new British businesses into the Japanese market as well as Japanese investment into the UK. The mission is supported by long-standing partnerships with the British Embassy, especially the Department for Business and Trade, and the British Council, as well as a network of trade organisations in Japan and the UK.

== Early history 1948–1990 ==
The British Chamber of Commerce in Japan was founded in the early months of 1948 by a number of British businessmen, including the late William Salter and the late Douglas Kenrick. Despite being founded in 1948, it wasn't until 1955 that the use of the name 'British Chamber of Commerce in Japan' was permitted by the Ministry of Trade and Industry. The permission to use this name was followed by the granting of the organisation Foreign Juridical Person status under Article 36 of the Civil Code. The Treaty of Commerce, Establishment and Navigation between Japan and the UK ratified this status in 1963, allowing the chamber to set up a permanent secretariat. In 1968 the BCCJ and the British Embassy Tokyo were involved in the organisation of 'British Week', which was to be held between September 26-October 5, 1969. Furthermore, after 'British Week' the Japanese prime minister is said to have commented that British businesses were not trying hard enough in the Japanese market - leading to the foundation of the British Marketing Centre (BMC) in Aoyama-itchome. In the following years, the British Marketing Centre, alongside the BCCJ and the British Embassy Tokyo were involved in collaboration of campaigns such as Opportunity Japan, Priority Japan and Opportunity Japan, which ran through the 1990s. In 1987, the decision was made to hire an executive director with a media and communications background, an important turning point in terms of advertising and making the BCCJ more accessible to members. Furthermore, in 1987, the chamber office was moved to a central location with improved office space and a large meeting room at its disposal, due to the generous donations to the chamber.

== Recent history ==
During the 1990s, the BCCJ produced a number of publications, such as Japan Posting, Research and Development in Japan, and Gaijin Scientist. These were the results of initiatives such as the Science and Technology Action Group and the Small and Medium Business Initiative. Moreover, in 1997 the British Industry Centre (BIC) was established in Yokohama, due to a collaboration between the BCCJ, the City of Yokohama and Nomura Real Estate, with the support of the British Government and the British Embassy Tokyo. This initiative was designed to encourage British firms to set up and do business in Japan. The 1990s also signified the first year that a Japanese member (Sukeyoshi Yamamoto of NSK Ltd.) had been asked to join the Executive Committee.

Following on from the 1990s, the 2000s were also a decade for improved diversity in amongst the BCCJ Executive Committee. This was demonstrated with the election of Alison Pockett as the President in 2004. Executive Director, Lori Henderson, has contributed to the BCCJ's mission by contributing to the local communities and volunteering. She received the Queen's 2013 New Years Honours List for her services in the aftermath of the 2011 Tohoku earthquake. The executive committee and staff continue to reflect the diversity and inclusion policy of the BCCJ. The BBCJ strives to expand their female membership through seeking balance in the business community.

== Books for Smiles Project ==
The BCCJ's Books for Smiles Project invites firms of all sizes and across all industry sectors to support the professional development of Japan's disadvantaged youth by donating books. All proceeds from the sale of second-hand books are used to provide tuition for youngsters leaving welfare facilities in Japan. Regarding the Books for Smiles Project, the BCCJ is in partnership with NPO Bridge for Smile, a not-for-profit organisation certified by the National Tax Agency which teaches care-leavers how to build social skills, manage a budget, find accommodation and get a job.

== British Business Awards ==
Held annually by the BCCJ every year since 2007, the British Business Awards are a not-for-profit event to recognise innovation and success for organizations across a plethora of British and Japanese industries. The BBAs are a prestigious award showcasing the extent of British success in Japan. Social contributions are awarded based on a commitment to community efforts, environmental sustainability, and recognition for ethical standards. Organizations are judged specifically in these criteria thus to endorse organisation's projects, products, or initiatives to the public.

== BCCJ Staff ==
Position	Name
Executive Director	Sarah Backley
Events Manager	Yousef Berouche
Operations Manager	Mariko Okawa
Digital and Communications Manager	Josh Welch

== 2026-2027 Executive Committee ==
Leadership Position	Member Name	Company
President	Richard Lyle	Intralink KK
Executive Committee Member	Heather Prosser	FGS Global
Executive Committee Member	Helen Iwata	Sasuga Communications K. K.
Executive Committee Member	Junko Kubokawa	Individual Member
Executive Committee Member	Hannah Perry	IHG Hotels & Resorts
Executive Committee Member	Ken Katayama	Individual Member
Executive Committee Member	Kentaro Kiso	Barclays Securities Japan Limited
Executive Committee Member	Anna Iveson	Rugby School Japan
Executive Committee Member	Mark Dytham MBE	Klein Dytham architecture
Executive Committee Member	Peter Harris	Clifford Chance
Executive Committee Member	Rob Williams BEM	AP Advisers
Executive Committee Member	Rob Peer	BAE Systems
Executive Committee Member	Kayo Osaka	Individual Member
Executive Committee Member	Vivian Tokai	Individual Member
Executive Committee Member	Rachna Ratra	Robert Walters

== High-Profile Visitors to the BCCJ ==
- Prince Charles and Princess Diana (1986)
- Margaret Thatcher (1993)
- Tony Blair (1998)
- Sir John Major (2012)
- Andrew Mountbatten Windsor (2013)
- Prince William (2015)
- Boris Johnson (2015)
- David Beckham (2016)
- Sir Sadiq Khan (2026)
