= Robert Fux =

Swedish actor (born 1979)

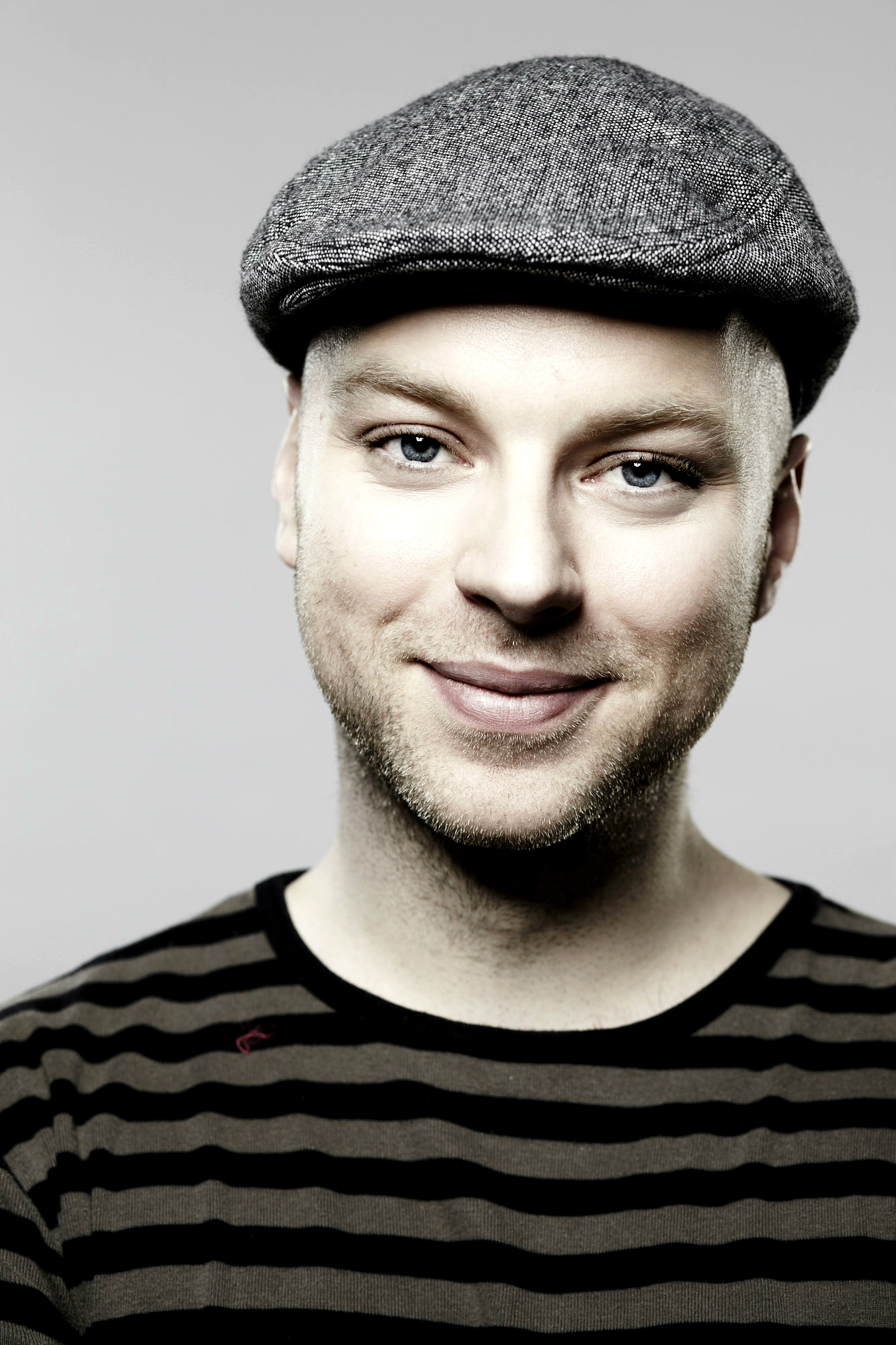
- Born: Robert Claus Johan Fux; 15 May 1979 (age 47); Kalmar, Sweden
- Occupations: Actor, performance artist, playwright, drag queen
- Years active: 1998–present

Robert Claus Johan Fux (born 15 May 1979) is a Swedish actor, performance artist, playwright and drag queen.

== Early life and education ==
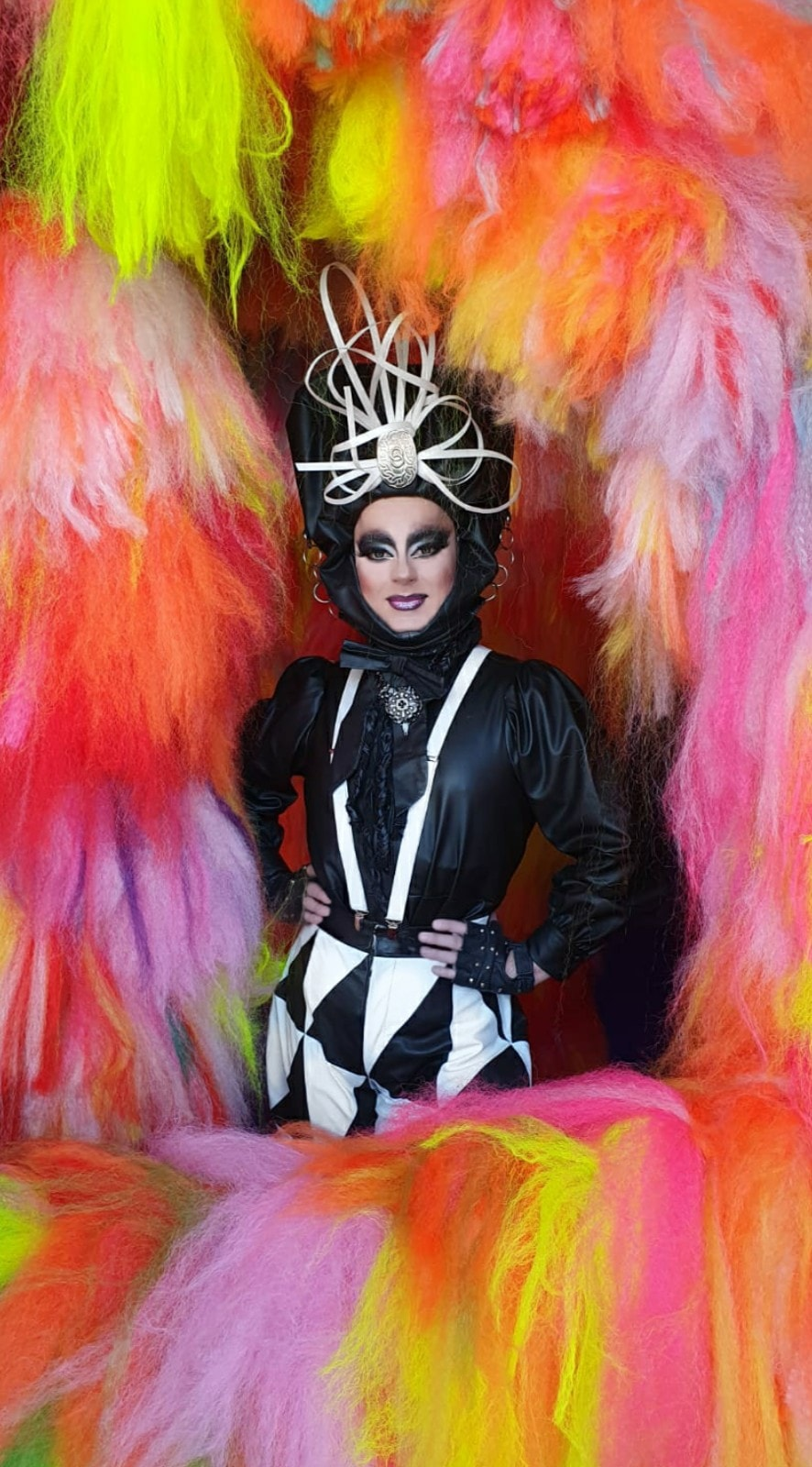
Robert Fux in drag

Robert Fux grew up outside of Kalmar and in Vienna, Austria along with six siblings. He is an alumnus of the Stockholm Academy of Dramatic Arts.

== Theatre ==
=== Roles (non-exhaustive) ===
Year	Role	Title	Director	Venue
2007		Räven som slukade böcker		Stockholm City Theatre
2008		Salong Giraff		Stockholm City Theatre
2011		Sugarstar Sockerstjärna		Stockholm City Theatre
2011		Barnen ifrån Frostmofjället		Stockholm City Theatre
2012		Orlando		Stockholm City Theatre
2014	Herbert Tingsten	Ansvaret är vårt – Tingsten…	Carolina Frände	Kulturhuset Stadsteatern
2015	Konferencieren	Cabaret; John Kander, Fred Ebb och Joe Masteroff	Ronny Danielsson	Kulturhuset Stadsteatern
2016	Medverkande	Maratondansen (They Shoot Horses Don't They?); Horace McCoy	Kenneth Kvarnström	Kulturhuset Stadsteatern
2016	Tybalt	Romeo och Julia (The Tragedy of Romeo and Juliet); William Shakespeare	Linus Tunström	Kulturhuset Stadsteatern
2017	Ulli Lerch	Lite lugn före stormen (Ein bisschen Ruhe vor dem Sturm); Theresia Walser	Dennis Sandin	Kulturhuset Stadsteatern
2017	Pickering	My Fair Lady; Alan Jay Lerner och Frederick Loewe	Elisa Kragerup	Kulturhuset Stadsteatern
2018	Marta	Ned med vapnen! (Die Waffen nieder!); Bertha von Suttner	Nora Nilsson	Kulturhuset Stadsteatern
2019	Claire	Jungfruleken (Les Bonnes); Jean Genet	Richard Turpin	Kulturhuset Stadsteatern/ Teater Giljotin
2020	Medverkande	Det stora teaterkalaset Calle Norlén	Sissela Kyle	Kulturhuset Stadsteatern
2021	Konferencieren	Almstriden	Hans Marklund	Kulturhuset Stadsteatern/ Parkteatern
2021		Dragshow – av och med Robert Fux		Vara konserthus

== TV ==
On September 6, 2022, it was announced that he had been cast as the host of Drag Race Sverige.

== Awards and accolades ==
- 2007 – Barometern OT's stora kulturpris
- 2008 — Rebells artistpris
- 2014 — Medeapriset
