= Intralink =

- Type: Limited company
- Industry: Management Consulting
- Founded: 1990
- Headquarters: Oxford, United Kingdom
- Key people: Andrew Blazye (Chairman), Gregory Sutch (CEO), Jonathan Cleave (Group MD), Alan Mockridge (President, USA), Jeremy Shaw (COO), Peter Yearsley (CFO), Chris Price (Non-executive director)
- Website: www.intralinkgroup.com

Intralink is a business development consultancy specialising in international markets.

Established in 1990, the firm helps companies develop their business overseas – often by securing customers or partners on their behalf – and supports government agencies seeking to grow their exports and attract foreign investment.

Intralink has its headquarters in Abingdon, Oxfordshire, UK, and a presence in more than 25 worldwide locations including Mumbai, Shanghai, Tokyo, Seoul, Taipei, Singapore, Bangkok, Ho Chi Minh City, Boston, Silicon Valley, Los Angeles, London and Paris.

The consultancy has won awards for its work to help companies expand internationally including, in the UK, The Queen’s Award for Enterprise and The King’s Award for Enterprise and, in the US, the President’s E Award for Export Service.

== Sectors and clients ==
Intralink's core sectors are electronics, medtech, life sciences, automotive, energy, software, telecoms and industrial. Its clients in these fields span startups, mid-market firms, and multinationals including BT, Nissan, Philips, Hitachi, Bluetooth, BMW, Nvidia and Shiseido.

The company also works with government agencies and economic development organisations to promote exports and attract foreign direct investment, with clients including several US states, the Canadian Government and the UK's Department for Business & Trade.

== History ==
=== 1990–1999 ===
Intralink was founded by former Jardine Matheson employee James Lawson at the tail end of the Japanese asset price bubble economy of the 1980s. Lawson was convinced that Japan had become a must-have market for European and US companies wanting to capitalise on its new status as a provider of products to the global market, both for western companies to supply to Japanese manufacturers and as a source of products and materials. Intralink’s first major success was in helping a Japanese manufacturer of hosiery to sell into the UK high street. For the next decade, the company worked with a range of western companies which judged that, even though the Japanese economic bubble had burst, post-war growth had raised Japanese purchasing power to parity with leading European companies.

=== 2000–2009 ===
Moving into its second decade, Intralink continued working across a broad range of sectors in Japan but increasingly focused on new technology.

At the same time, it began replicating its success in the neighbouring emerging powerhouse of China, which was already attracting interest from foreign companies. While Japan continued to be the main focus of the business, more and more foreign companies were moving sourcing and manufacturing to China. Intralink found a role performing supplier and partner benchmark and market landscaping projects for western companies. It established an initial representative office in Shanghai in 2001, then a wholly foreign-owned entity there in 2008.

The company also opened for business in the USA in 2008, establishing an office in Silicon Valley to help North American companies expand in Asia.

=== 2010-2019 ===
With the rise of Chinese companies such as Huawei, ZTE, Lenovo and Haier selling own-branded products on global markets, the priority for western companies shifted from sourcing and manufacturing in China to getting their components, software and IP into the products of Chinese brands. Intralink capitalised on this trend by working with western companies to develop and execute their sales and licensing strategies for the Chinese market.

Intralink also opened offices in South Korea and Taiwan in 2010. South Korea, the other big Northeast Asian manufacturing economy, had experienced such spectacular growth that, by 2004, it had "joined the trillion-dollar club of world economies".

=== 2020 onwards ===
Continuing its growth, Intralink opened an office in Beijing in 2021 and in Singapore in 2022.

In 2023, the company received £19.6 million investment from Mobeus Equity Partners to drive its further expansion.

In 2025, Intralink opened offices in India and acquired long-standing Southeast Asia market expansion company Orissa International, which gave it a strong presence in the region’s six major economies of Vietnam, Thailand, Singapore, Indonesia, Malaysia and the Philippines.
