= Daniela Rathana =

Swedish singer

- Born: Daniela Sörensen; 11 February 1996 (age 30); Akalla, Stockholm Municipality, Sweden
- Genres: Pop
- Occupations: Singer, songwriter
- Label: Dundra

Daniela Sörensen, better known by her stage name Daniela Rathana, is a Swedish pop singer. She was born and grew up in Akalla and was a backup singer for Sabina Ddumba, Kent, Zara Larsson and Seinabo Sey before embarking on a solo career. In 2020, she released her debut EP, Halva vägen fri. In February 2021, she released the song "Testamente", a duet with Oskar Linnros. Her debut album, Rathana Club was released in 2021 via Linnros' label Dundra; it includes the single "Testamente". Her 2022 single "Vandraren" is inspired by Basshunter's "Boten Anna" and Crazy Frog music. In 2024, she released the track "Where Strippers Go to Die" as the lead single from the album of the same name.

== Filmography ==
=== Television ===
Year	Title	Role	Notes	Ref.
2023	Drag Race Sverige	Herself	Guest judge; Episode: "Start Your Engines"	

== Discography ==
=== Studio albums ===
Title	Details	Peak chart positions
Title	Details	SWE
Rathana Club	Released: 24 September 2021; Label: Dundra, Universal; Formats: Digital download, streaming	22
Where Strippers Go to Die	Released: 11 April 2025; Label: Dundra, Universal; Formats: Digital download, streaming	20

=== EPs ===
- Halva vägen fri (2020)

=== Singles ===
Title	Year	Peak chart positions		Album
Title	Year	SWE	NOR	Album
"Nu till livet"	2019	—	—	Non-album single
"Efterlyst"	2019	—	—	Halva vägen fri
"Ansikte"	2020	—	—	Non-album single
"Testamente" (with Oskar Linnros)	2021	94	—	Rathana Club
"Satan i gatan"	2021	20	—	Satan i gatan 10 år
"Havanna"	2021	—	—	Rathana Club
"Farstaglitter"	2021	— (Note: "Farstaglitter" did not enter the Swedish Singellista Chart, but peaked at number two on the Swedish Heatseeker Chart.)	—	Rathana Club
"Kyss!"	2022	— (Note: "Kyss!" did not enter the Swedish Singellista Chart, but peaked at number five on the Swedish Heatseeker Chart.)	—	Rathana Club
"Âtervändsgränd"	2022	46	—	Så mycket bättre 2022 – Tolkningarna
"Vandraren"	2022	15	—	Så mycket bättre 2022 – Tolkningarna
"Alltid blå"	2022	— (Note: "Alltid blå" did not enter the Swedish Singellista Chart, but peaked at number five on the Swedish Heatseeker Chart.)	—	Så mycket bättre 2022 – Tolkningarna
"Where Strippers Go to Die"	2024	— (Note: "Where Strippers Go to Die" did not enter the Swedish Singellista Chart, but peaked at number two on the Swedish Heatseeker Chart.)	—	Where Strippers Go to Die
"Drömfångare" (with Jireel)	2024	— (Note: "Drömfångare" did not enter the Swedish Singellista Chart, but peaked at number one on the Swedish Heatseeker Chart.)	—	Luanda
"Pad Thai"	2024	—	—	Where Strippers Go to Die
"Henda i været" (with Ramón)	2024	—	15	Torres Tivoli
"Fuck ditt liv"	2024	90	—	Where Strippers Go to Die
"Säg nåt"	2025	— (Note: "Säg nåt" did not enter the Swedish Singellista Chart, but peaked at number one on the Swedish Heatseeker Chart.)	—	Where Strippers Go to Die
"Fortare"	2025	— (Note: "Fortare" did not enter the Swedish Singles Chart, but peaked at number 18 on the Swedish Heatseeker chart.)	—	Where Strippers Go to Die
