= BatAAr =

Band from Gothenburg, Sweden

BatAAr was a band from Gothenburg, Sweden, active between 2005 and 2019.

== Group ==
BatAAr was founded in Gothenburg, Västra Götaland, Sweden. BatAAr had four members; Endigo (vocals), Patrik (guitar), Simon (guitar), and Tobias (drums).

== History ==
Going all the way back to 2005, BatAAr started when school mates Simon and Patrik, both being musicians on their own, decided to start work together. Tobias joined shortly thereafter and the trio kept playing together throughout their remaining school years. They completed the full 5-piece lineup and thus BatAAr's first EP "ABSORB" was released in early 2011. The EP, mastered by Göran Finnberg gained instant nationwide traction, with radio airplay and live shows across the country. Following the EP, the bands desired for originality and started incorporating streaks of typical Japanese visual kei style resulting in vivid looks in their music videos, outfits and live shows. In addition, the band started a close collaboration with the Swedish recording studio Top Floor Studios run by producer, and Verge family member Jakob Herrmann and Danish mixing engineer Tue Madsen.

Japan was one of BatAAr's steadiest bases, with annual tours following, each extensively larger in scope than the last, and multiple sold-out shows each tour. They also coined the term Art Metal for their brand of diverse soundscapes fused with the aesthetic style and attention to detail found in Japanese visual kei. Following the recent success, the band released their first mini-album titled 'MEMORIA' in 2014. This album was a compilation of previously released singles combined with a slew of new songs. For the release of "MEMORIA", BatAAr signed a deal with 'FWD Inc' – Japan's most prominent visual kei record label, which is the only non-Japanese act to ever sign a deal with.

2015 was a year of re-evaluation for the band. The core trio of Patrik, Simon and Tobias decided that BatAAr was ready to take the next huge leap as a band. This resulted in the recruitment of long-time friend Endigo, another pioneer of Visual Rock in the western music scene, who would go on to become the new vocalist of the band.

In January 2016, the band officially launched the rebooted BatAAr with the release of the two-track single "REBIRTH" featuring re-recorded versions of the tracks 'THE DISTANCE' and "RISKBREAKER" with Endigo's vocals. Shortly thereafter, the band released their first Endigo-fronted single and music video, titled "ALWAYS DIE YOUNG". This release was a success among fans and industry people, quickly gaining over 10.000 hits within its first week in the market.

During the production of the fighting game Tekken 7, series director Katsuhiro Harada was impressed by the band, and felt the game could benefit from their songs. The group originally met Harada during a Twitter conversation when one of the band members asked him where he could buy a Tekken action figure in Tokyo. Harada invited the group to dine with him and presented them with his idea. As the character Lars Alexanderssson is half-Swedish, he asked the band to compose the character's theme song, which he hoped fans of the franchise would look forward to hearing when playing the character. The group then went to Japanese arcades to play Tekken 7 as Lars while listening to their own music, which they found fitting. Honored by the proposal, the band said Harada had given them complete freedom as long as the song included Swedish lyrics to fit Lars' nationality. Band member Patrik, responsible for writing the lyrics, made extensive research about Lars' role in the Tekken series, as well as fan theories about him, in an attempt to understand Lars' characterization in Tekken 7 and make the lyrics fit. BatAAr's theme song for Lars was ultimately titled "Vrede" (Swedish for "Wrath"), and included in both a CD single as well as the original soundtrack of Tekken 7. The band took a liking to Lars to the point where all the band members played Tekken 7's tournament mode as him, singing "Vrede" during pauses.

VGMOnline described VREDE as a "tune definitely fits the heavy metal bill, featuring guttural vocals and heavy rock". However, they still called it out of place when compared with other tracks.

== Discography ==
Title	Release Date
Absorb	February 23, 2011
Rebirth	January 14, 2016
Gravitas	2016
DEVOUR	March 25, 2018
Under Isen	November 28, 2018
GHOSTMODERN(ism)	April 12, 2019
THE FINAL TRAIN	September 11, 2019
