= Guy Perryman =

British radio personality (born 1965)

Guy Perryman MBE
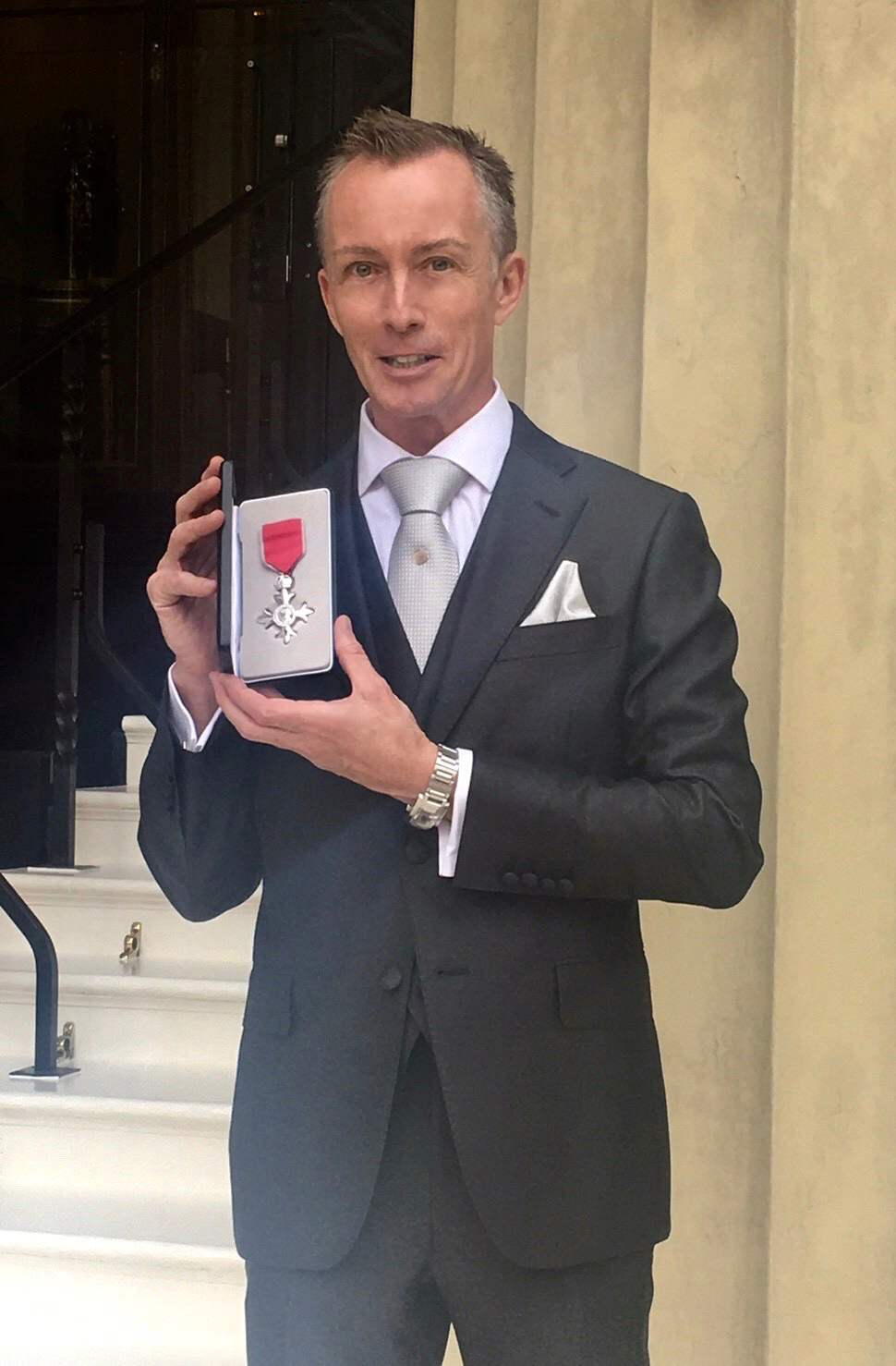
- Perryman at Buckingham Palace in 2017
- Born: Guy Richard Perryman; 2 February 1965 (age 61); Dunfermline, Scotland
- Occupations: Narrator; radio personality; producer; DJ
- Years active: 1983–present
- Awards: MBE
- Presenting career
- Show: The Guy Perryman Show
- Station: InterFM
- Time slot: Monday–Friday, 5:00–7:00
- Country: Japan

Japanese name
- Katakana: ガイ・ペリマン
- Website: guyperryman.com

Guy Richard Perryman MBE (born 2 February 1965) is a British radio personality, narrator, voice actor, producer and writer. He works in Japan principally as broadcaster with radio station InterFM, voice narrator with television station NHK World, and is a former Executive Committee member of the British Chamber of Commerce in Japan.

== Biography ==
Perryman was born in Scotland on 2 February 1965 to English parents and was raised in Scotland, England, Singapore and Australia. His grandfather was jockey, trainer and breeder Richard Perryman winner of various classic British horse races.

As a child and teenager Perryman performed in stage musicals including Carousel with Canberra Philharmonic Society, Old Time Music Hall with Canberra Repertory Society, and Cabaret with Stirling College.

Perryman started DJ'ing at a local university radio station at 16 year old. From 1983 to 1990, he was a radio DJ, club promoter and copywriter in Sydney.

In 1990, Perryman went to Japan as the chief DJ of Virgin Megastores, and from 1996, started broadcasting at InterFM, hosting various programs and interviewing celebrities such as Paul McCartney, Sting, Nile Rodgers, Gwen Stefani and Coldplay as well as DJ'ing for Prince William's reception party during his visit to Japan in 2015. Perryman was the first radio DJ in Japan to broadcast live from Fuji Rock Festival at the second annual festival held in 1998 at Tokyo Bayside Square broadcasting from the Virgin Club Tent across Japan on Virgin Mega Station cable/satellite radio channel on CAN System.

In 2013 and 2014, Perryman was the world's first person to regularly DJ live onboard commercial airline flights for Virgin Atlantic Airways between Tokyo and London.

In 2017, Perryman was appointed MBE by Queen Elizabeth II in recognition of his activities and contributions to British music in Japan. Perryman won Person of the Year award at the British Chamber of Commerce in Japan, British Business Awards 2013.

Perryman has hosted the morning radio show The Guy Perryman Show on InterFM 897 broadcast across Japan on Radiko since 2017.

Perryman is voice narrator on programs for NHK World, including J-Flicks, Japanology Plus, and Zero Waste Life, and on promotion videos for corporate brands including Panasonic, Honda, Sony, Uniqlo, Citizen, and Japan Imperial Palaces Guide app. He is also a character voice actor in animations and games including Metal Gear Solid, Shenmue, Boktai, Detective Conan, and Hollywood film Road to the Sky.

In 2020, Perryman executive produced and re-wrote lyrics for the song Christmas Hummingbird by Japan-based British brothers singer-songwriter duo The Watanabes. Since 2020, music for the soundtrack of the series Supersonic Cities written and produced by Perryman has been released, starting with the launch story Adventure 1 – Tokyotronica.

For the 2001, 2002, 2003, 2022 New Year's Eve Countdown Perryman was the DJ at Park Hyatt Tokyo.

Perryman has produced events in Tokyo including British Bonenkai series in 2012, 2013, 2014, charity fund-raising series Black Card Cabaret in 2015, 2016, 2017, and Bridge Street Market, London themed Christmas market in Tokyo in 2016, 2017.

Perryman has MC'd for the British Chamber of Commerce in Japan, British Business Awards annual event since 2012.

Perryman's music reviews and interviews have been published in magazines including the British Chamber of Commerce in Japan magazine Acumen, Eyescream magazine in Japan, and dDK magazine Singapore.

In 2024 Perryman started performing as a benshi silent film narrator performing live on stage voice characterisations in English of Japanese silent films on screen. Performances have included for NHK World TV programme J-Flicks; GE Theater, Harajuku, Tokyo; and Regent Street Cinema, London.

== Appearances ==
=== Movies ===
- Shenmue: The Movie (2001) – Tao Duo Ji

=== Televised anime ===
- Detective Conan (2001) – Ricardo Valeira (eps. 238–239)

=== Radio ===
- Guy Perryman Show (MegaNet, 2007–2009)
- Global Satellite (InterFM, 2009–2012)
- LHR – London Hit Radio (InterFM, 2012–2017)
- The Guy Perryman Show (InterFM, 2017–present)

=== Games ===
- G-Saviour (2000)
- Shenmue (2000) – Tao Duo Ji, Ichiro Sakurada, Hitoshi Numakudo
- Boktai: The Sun is in Your Hand (2003) – Master Otenko, Count
- Boktai 2: Solar Boy Django (2004) – Master Otenko, Ringo
- Tekken 5 (2004)
- Lunar Knights (2007) – Toasty, Margrave Rymer

=== Web series ===
- Fastening Days (2016) – George (ep. 2)
- Ultra Galaxy Fight: New Generation Heroes (2019) – Dark Lugiel

=== Commercials ===
- Virgin Megastore
- J-Wave
- Suzuki
- Subaru
- Sony
- Toshiba
- Panasonic
- Bridgestone
- Honda
- Marui
- Mitsubishi Motors
- Lotte Corporation
