= Clavister =

Swedish software company

Clavister Holding
- Company type: Public
- Traded as: Nasdaq Stockholm: CLAV
- Industry: Security software
- Founded: Örnsköldsvik, Sweden (1997; 29 years ago)
- Headquarters: Örnsköldsvik, Sweden
- Products: Security appliances, Web Application Security
- Subsidiaries: PhenixID
- Website: clavister.com

Clavister is a Swedish company specialized in network security software, listed on NASDAQ First North.

According to a report from 451 Research, the Edward Snowden NSA leaks and consequent loss of trust in US-based products helped with the international expansion of Clavister.

Clavister has a global presence with customers such as the Japanese NTT-BP, and the German Marbach Group.

Clavister has partnerships with for example the Japanese Canon-ITS, and in the area of virtualized network security with Nokia Networks, and Artesyn.

In August 2016, Clavister announced the acquisition of partner PhenixID, an identity and access management (IAM) provider.

== See also ==
Comparison of firewalls
