= Elecktra =

Swedish drag performer

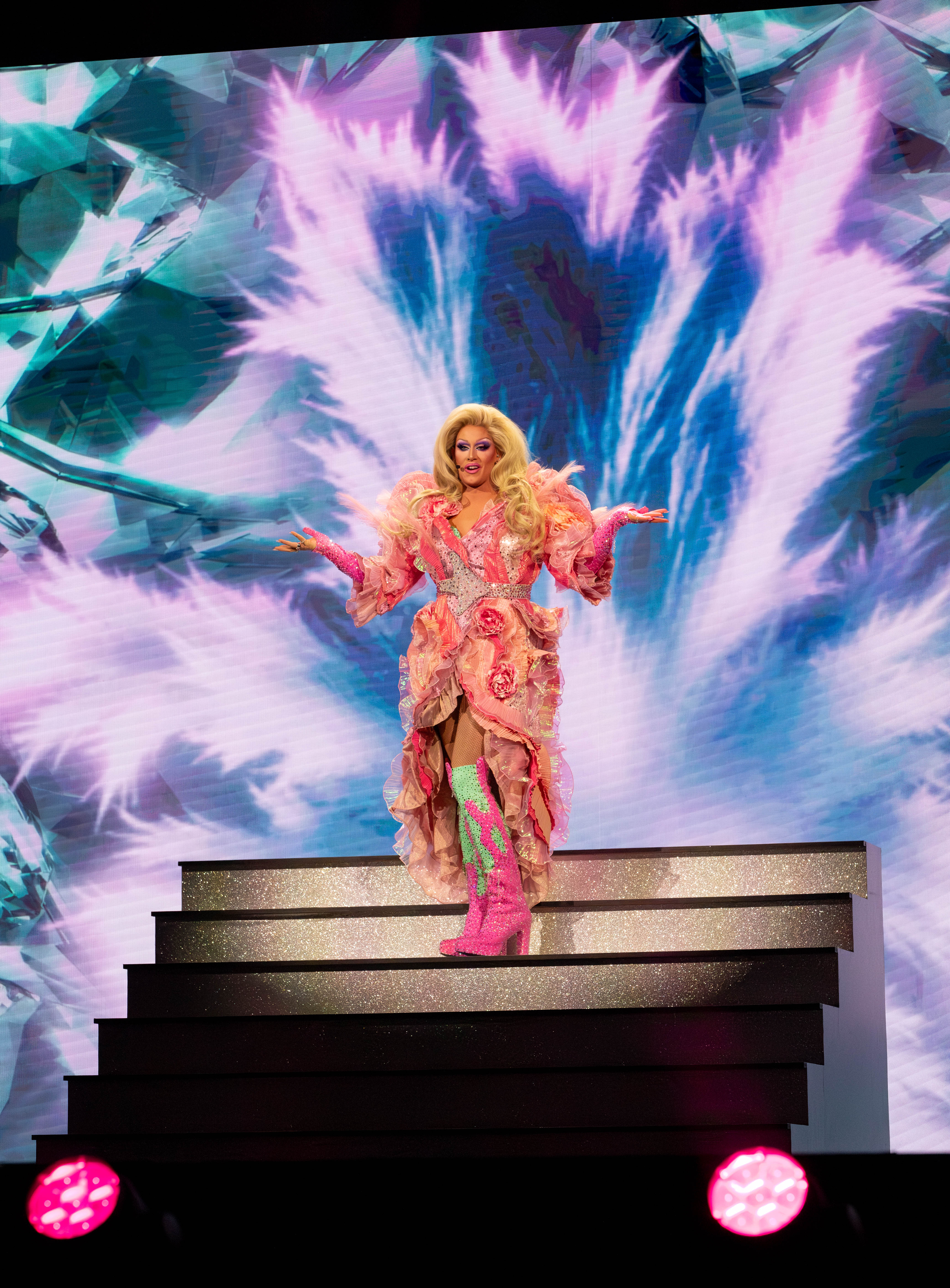
- Elecktra in 2024
- Born: Robin Werner
- Occupation: Drag performer

Robin Werner, known by the stage name Elecktra, is a Swedish drag performer who competed on Drag Race Sverige.

Werner participated in Melodifestivalen 2024 with the song "Banne maj", being eliminated from her heat on 2 March 2024. The following 5 May, she co-hosted the opening "Turquoise Carpet" event of the Eurovision Song Contest 2024 alongside Tia Kofi.

== Discography ==
=== Singles ===
List of singles, with selected peak chart positions
Title	Year	Peak chart positions	Album
Title	Year	SWE	Album
”Banne maj"	2024	38	Non-album single
