= Imaa Queen =

Swedish drag performer (born 1993)

- Born: Adam Sergel Johannes Spjuth; 26 December 1993 (age 32); Värnamo, Sweden
- Occupation: Drag queen
- Television: Drag Race Sverige
- Website: imaaqueen.com

Adam Sergel Johannes Spjuth, better known by his stage name Imaa Queen (born December 26, 1993), is a Swedish drag queen and entertainer.

== Career and recognition ==
As Imaa Queen, Adam has been nominated for the QX Förlag award "Drag of the Year", which is awarded at the annual QX Gaygalan Awards, the years 2018, 2019, 2020, 2021 and 2022. In 2022, he was the winner of the title. Imaa Queen also won the international drag artist competition The EuroStars Drag Contest in 2021, the template of Eurodrag.

Spjuth was one of the producers of the 2020-2021 Lights Event 08, the show concept "C'est La Vie Stockholm" and "C'est la Vie Sundays", which was performed on the legendary M/S Patricia in Stockholm. "C'est La Vie" was a variety cabaret that adapted to COVID-19 pandemic restrictions and allowed performers to entertain smaller audiences.

Imaa Queen was cast in the first season of Drag Race Sverige.
