= Sekora =

Sekora (Czech feminine: Sekorová) is a surname. Notable people with this surname include:

- Lou Sekora (born 1931), Canadian politician
- Ondřej Sekora (1899–1967), Czech artist and writer

== See also ==
- Meanings of minor planet names: 13001–14000#406
- Sýkora
- Sikora
