= Szikora =

Szikora is a surname. It is the Hungarian form of Czech/Slovak Sýkora and Polish Sikora, from Proto-Slavic *sykora, meaning tit (bird). Notable people with the surname include:

- Ilona Szikora (1918–?), Hungarian athlete
- István Szikora (born 1964), Hungarian boxer
- Juraj Szikora (1947–2005), Slovak footballer
- Melinda Szikora (born 1988), Hungarian handball player
- Pavol Szikora (1952–2021), Slovak race walker
- Szilvia Szikora (born 1965), Hungarian speed skater
