= Krzysztof Sikora =

Krzysztof Sikora may refer to:

- Krzysztof Gustaw Sikora (born 1954) - Chairperson of the Kuyavian-Pomeranian Regional Assembly (since 2006)
- Krzysztof Ryszard Sikora (born 1959) - Member of Polish Sejm V Term (2005–2007)
- Krzysztof Sikora (footballer) from Polonia Słubice
