= Otakar Slavík =

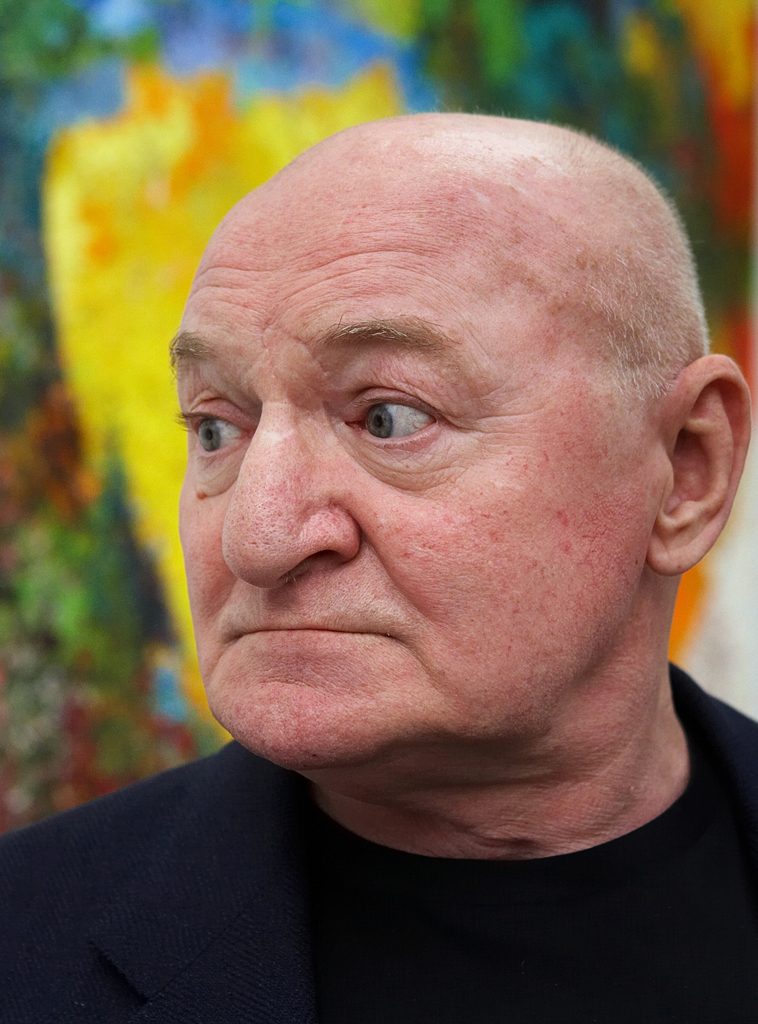
- Slavík in 2007
- Born: 18 December 1931; Pardubice, Czechoslovakia
- Died: 3 November 2010 (aged 78); Vienna, Vienna
- Education: Academy of Fine Arts in Prague
- Known for: painter, draughtsman
- Awards: Goldene Lorbeer des Künstlerhauses, Vienna (2001)

Otakar Slavík (18 December 1931 – 3 November 2010) was a Czech painter, draughtsman and printmaker. He is considered one of the most important colourists in Czech art. He was a signatory of Charter 77.

== Life ==
Otakar Slavík was born into a tailor's family in Hrochův Týnec. He spent his childhood there and graduated from the Stadtschule. After the war he apprenticed for one year in a porcelain factory in Klášterec nad Ohří and then moved to the ceramics school in Bechyně (1946-1948). From 1948 to 1952 he studied sculpture at the Secondary Industrial School of Stone and Sculpture in Hořice. After graduation (1952) he was not accepted to the Academy of Fine Arts in Prague and therefore began to study art at the Faculty of Education of Comenius University in Bratislava (prof. Eugen Nevan). From there, he transferred in 1953 to the Faculty of Education at Charles University for the newly opened professorship of painting and drawing for secondary schools (prof. Karel Lidický, Martin Salcman).

Martin Salcman, who had studied with Jan Preisler and was friends with František Kupka, introduced the sculptor Slavík to painting and influenced his work for life with his method of teaching, by emphasis on considering the relationships between visual elements and by pointing out the relative validity of their values. As a teacher, he made a significant impact on completely different painters - his assistant Zdeněk Sýkora, Karel Malich, Vladislav Mirvald, Dalibor Chatrný and Otakar Slavík. Saltzman's pupils, each in their own original way, developed his method of painting. Since the school was outside the centre of communist party interest and control, Professor Salcman and his assistants Zdeněk Sýkora and Kamil Linhart could inform the students about contemporary world art.

After graduating in 1958, although he was still receiving a scholarship from the Fine Arts Fund for several years, Otakar Slavík decided to make a living by manual labour in order to do without the inevitable artistic compromises with the regime. For five years he worked as a stagehand at the National Theatre. After his dismissal from the theatre, he was employed in a prefabrication plant, as a wagon unloader, a mover and in other physically demanding professions. From the time of his studies, he was friendly especially with Zdeněk Sýkora, the circle around Václav Bartovský and Václav Boštík, but despite his lively nature, he remained isolated both privately and in his work. Classical music concerts played an important role in his life.

His first solo exhibition was in 1964 in the Small Gallery of the Park of Culture. Since the exhibition at Mánes Gallery in 1966, he became the subject of professional interest in connection with the emerging New Figuration. In the second half of the 1960s, he established himself as a painter and draughtsman, in 1967 he acquired his own studio and from 1968 he was able to devote himself exclusively to his painting. He was represented at numerous exhibitions in Czechoslovakia and abroad. In 1968, he participated as a guest in the exhibitions of the Křižovatka group, organized by Jiří Padrta under the title New sensitivity.

Slavík's second exhibition of paintings at the Václav Špála Gallery (1970), together with sculptures by Karel Nepraš, led to a rapprochement with artists around the Křižovnická School. Eugen Brikcius, Ivan and Věra Jirous, Dana Němcová and the philosopher Ivan Dubský became his new and lifelong friends.

Soon after the Warsaw Pact invasion of Czechoslovakia and the new consolidation of the communist regime, Otakar Slavík lost the opportunity to exhibit and returned to manual labour. In 1971, he took a job as a wagon driver for the newly established normalization Union of Czech Artists. The choice of this job not only corresponded to Slavík's strength of character and independence, it was also, in its absurdity, in line with the poetics of the Křižovnická School.

The shameful situation of the 1970s led him to be one of the first to sign Charter 77. The following year he suffered a severe myocardial infarction, which meant that it was impossible to continue to earn a living from manual labour. After signing Charter 77, he was expelled from the Artists' Fund and automatically lost his right to social security, the right to a studio and the option to buy paints from the Fund's shop, which was the only one in Prague that sold professional art supplies.

In 1980 he emigrated with his wife to Austria, where he was granted political asylum. Otakar Slavík became a member of the art association Vienna Künstlerhaus. Thanks to his wife's employment, for the first time in his life he had no financial worries and could devote himself to painting and his new-found great hobby, visiting galleries and museums. He made annual trips abroad to see art (London, Venice, Florence, Paris, Zurich, Madrid, Toledo). In 1985 he obtained Austrian citizenship. In addition to Vienna, he has exhibited in Switzerland, Germany, the United States and France. In 1988, he participated in the Expressiv exhibition in Vienna, Washington and New York, organized by Meda Mládková.

In 1989 he suffered another heart attack and had to undergo a very complicated heart operation. He returned to the Czech Republic with a large retrospective exhibition organized by the National and Central Bohemia Galleries in the premises of the Municipal Library in 1991. This was followed by exhibitions at Mánes Gallery, Bayer & Bayer Gallery, Prague Castle Ballroom, Via Art Gallery, Nová síň in Prague and in Kutná Hora. In 1992 he became a member of the Umělecká beseda. Slavík painted in Vienna and during his stays in Prague. His work was suddenly interrupted by his unexpected death in November 2010.

=== Awards ===
- 1987 Gold Medal of the Künstlerhaus Vienna
- 1992 Irene und Peter Ludwig Preis
- 1996 Prize of the Union of Visual Artists of the Czech Republic, Intersalon České Budějovice
- 2001 Goldene Lorbeer des Künstlerhauses, Vienna

== Work ==
=== Painting ===
Slavík's development as a painter has a remarkable unity, coherence and logic, despite its significant changes and constant renewal. He depicts the figure or object as an impersonal shape, which he interprets by means of painting. The strength of this method lies in Slavík's extraordinary coloristic abilities, which enabled him to make from the figural composition at the same time a peculiar composition of colored surfaces, organized in intricately harmonious and discordant configurations.

The painter was influenced by his training in ceramics modelling in Bechyně and especially by sculpting in the stone masonry school in Hořice, which deepened his figurative sensibility for lifetime. The theme of his figures is the general existential situation of man, not any particular activity. Slavík's experience as a modeller and his fascination with painting are intertwined in them. The position or situation of the figure is from the beginning the result of a process in which paint enters the space of the painting and becomes a shape. (Slavík: "I do not paint the figure, it must come into being during the process of painting.") The high pasty layers of colour are sometimes the result of overpainting and testify to his struggle for expression. He uses them to emphasize the saturation of the colouring and to add vibrancy. Beauty in his conception is not identical with grace or prettiness or the pursuit of a polished style. Even where a painting resembles a battlefield, it is the result of the elemental joy of painting. According to Věra Jirousová, Slavík evaluated the aesthetic principles of the European tradition with the austerity of a Central European, and in his work the will to order and self-discipline clashes with the chaos that breeds all living things.

Slavík's first paintings were influenced by French painting, especially Bonnard and Matisse. In Czech art he follows painters from the early 20th century, especially Jindřich Prucha, Jan Preisler and Bohumil Kubišta (Portrait of Miss Ulčová, 1955). The bitter confrontation of the romantic concept of art with the reality of Slavík's life as a stagehand gave rise to a series of flying ballerinas, figures in spasmodic motion during a dive across the stage, along with another theme, the life of worn-out workers, stagehands and beer drinkers (Flying Ballerina, 1962, Stagehand 1958). The dark colouring points to existential experience and the loss of romantic illusions (Man with a Beer, 1964). The atmosphere of the painting Café in the Municipal House (1959), where Slavík retreated in between work, depicts the alienation of a lonely man.

Around the mid-1960s, he abandoned his previous way of painting. The colours of some of his paintings are muted and the brush touches become isolated in the form of small spots of colour (Standing, 1964). In the second half of the 1960s, he composed his paintings mainly or exclusively from discs of colour, sometimes in the form of a regular grid (Lying, 1966). Slavík's work is not merely about the optical arrangement of spots of colour, as in Seurat's work, but by various treatments of colour he seeks to build order in the image, as Cézanne did. The painter consciously abandoned for a time the plasticity and depth of pictorial space and gave the coloured point a constructive role (Slavík: "The point, which is my starting point, is not only a building element, but also a certainty and freedom in its definition. Constructive tendencies are close to me").

Constructive tendencies affected many artists in the mid-1960s. The key word became anti-romanticism, associated with the suppression of subjectivity of expression and the purging of painting of illusions and symbols. The humanized geometry was signing on to the technical givens of civilization (called "second nature") and the new principles of painting were strict and precise, concrete, clear, factual illustrative and positive in relation to man. Otakar Slavík exhibits with the Křižovatka group and representatives of the New Sensibility, but he remains a solitary artist who combines the most rigorous solutions with more traditional, but equally distinct approaches. He shared with a number of exhibitors an interest in the purely painterly qualities of the picture and the application of order in its composition, but his direction in terms of meaning was different and, like Alena Kučerová, he did not abandon figuration.

The earliest abstracting shift, accompanied by the spatial isolation of artistic signs, is evident in the painting Dissection, which mirrors the artist's authentic experience and subsequent contemplation (Dissection, 1967).

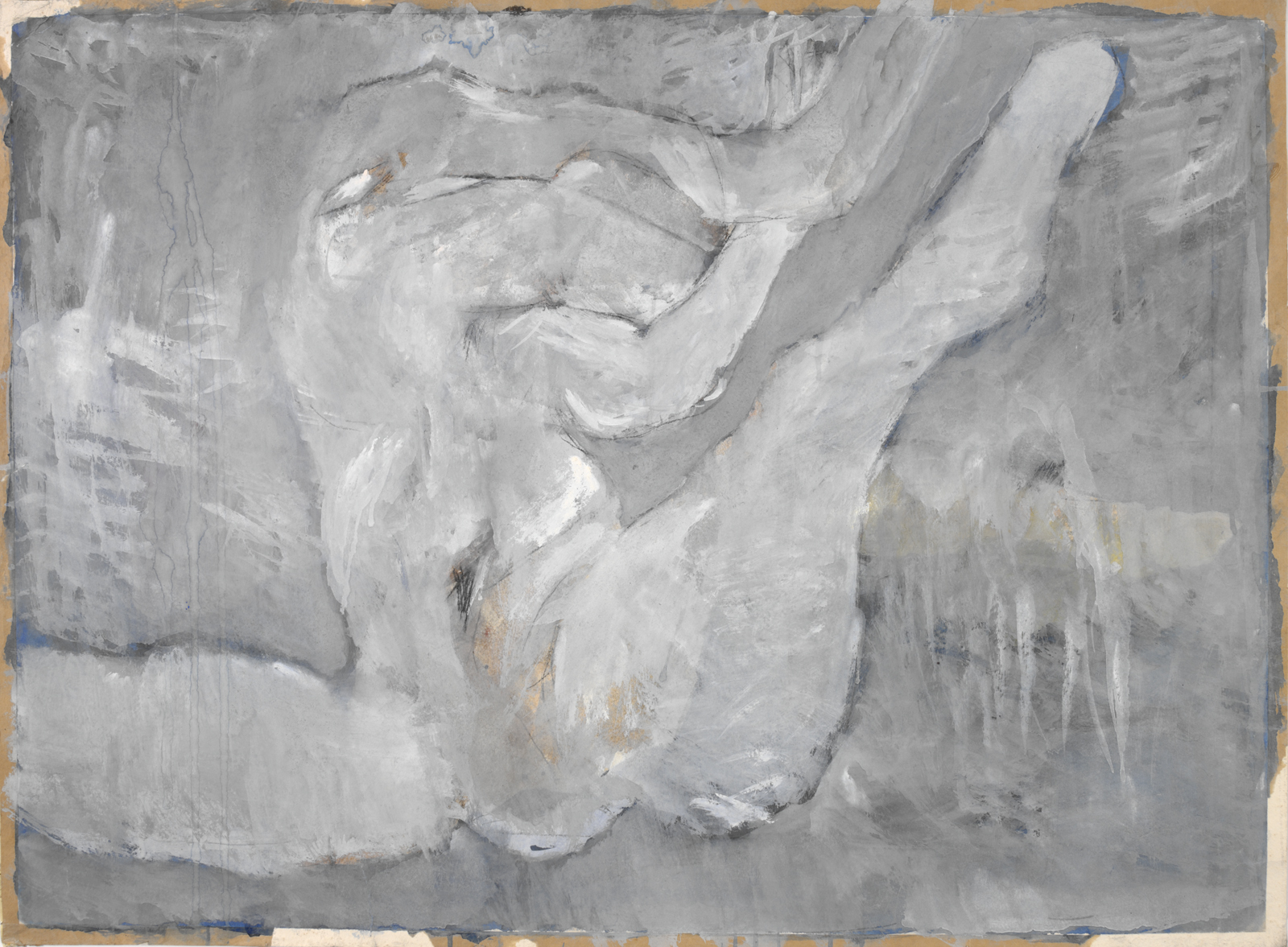
Ballerina (2nd half of the 1950s)

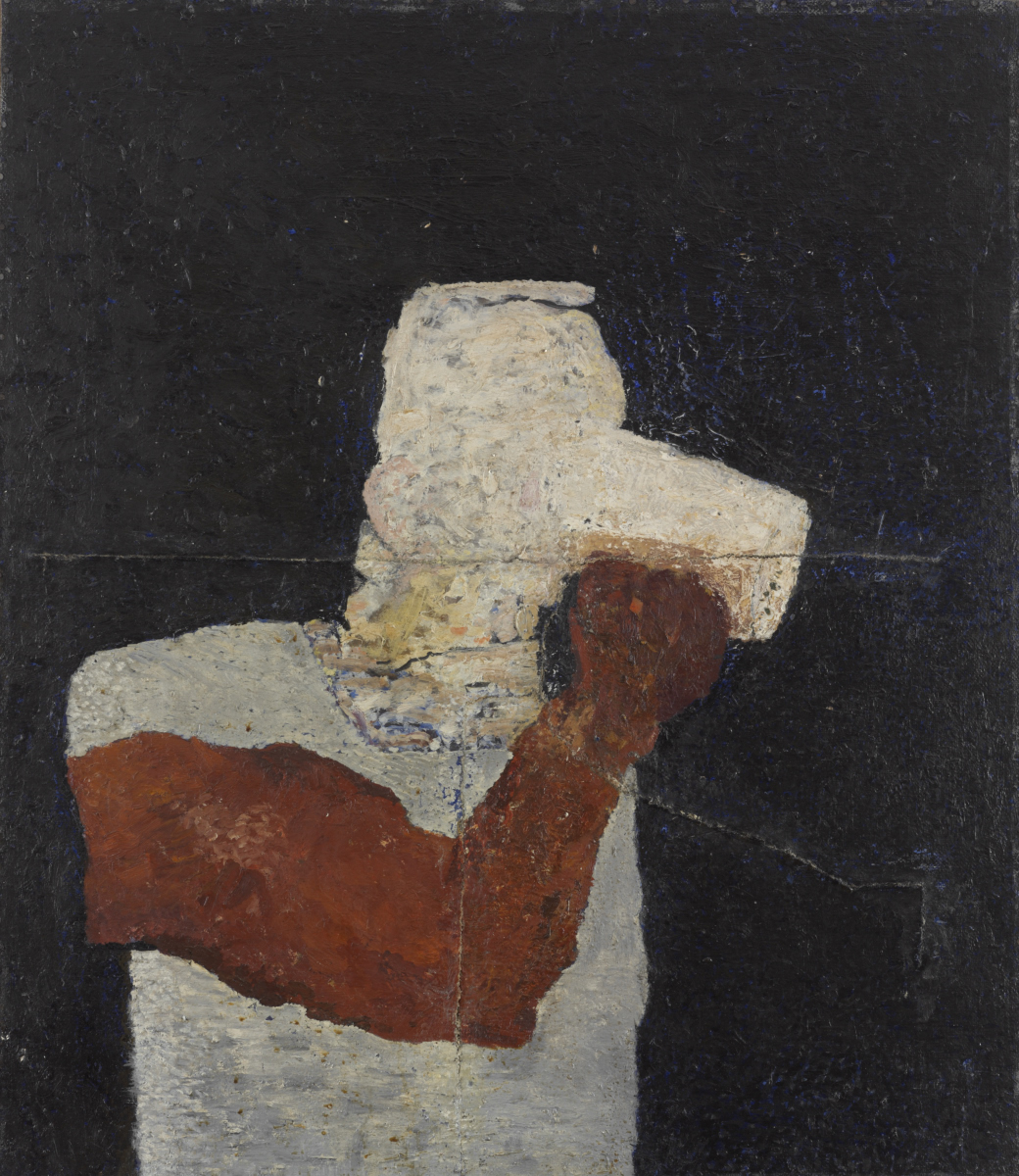
Man with the beer (1965)

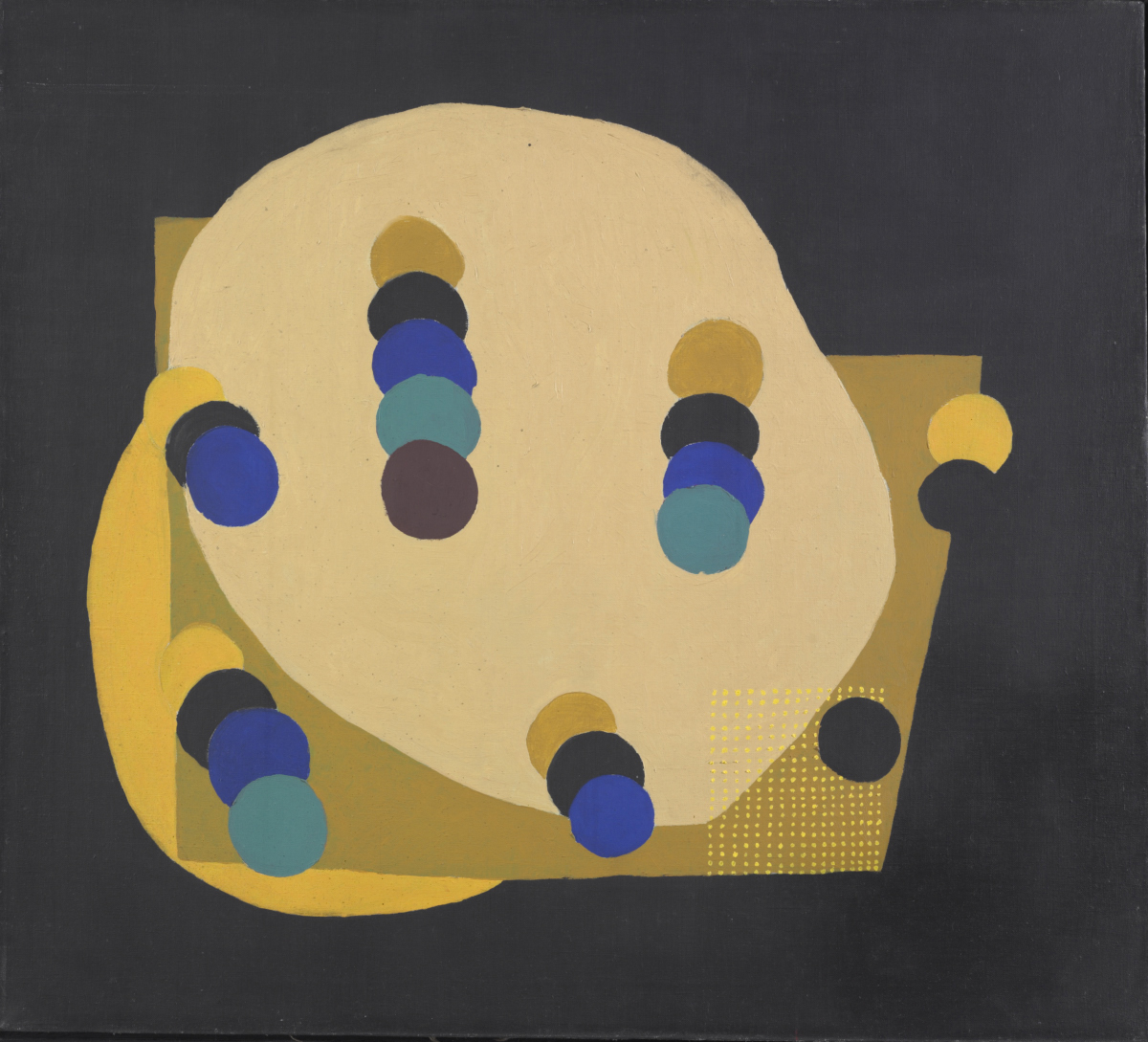
Dissection (1967)

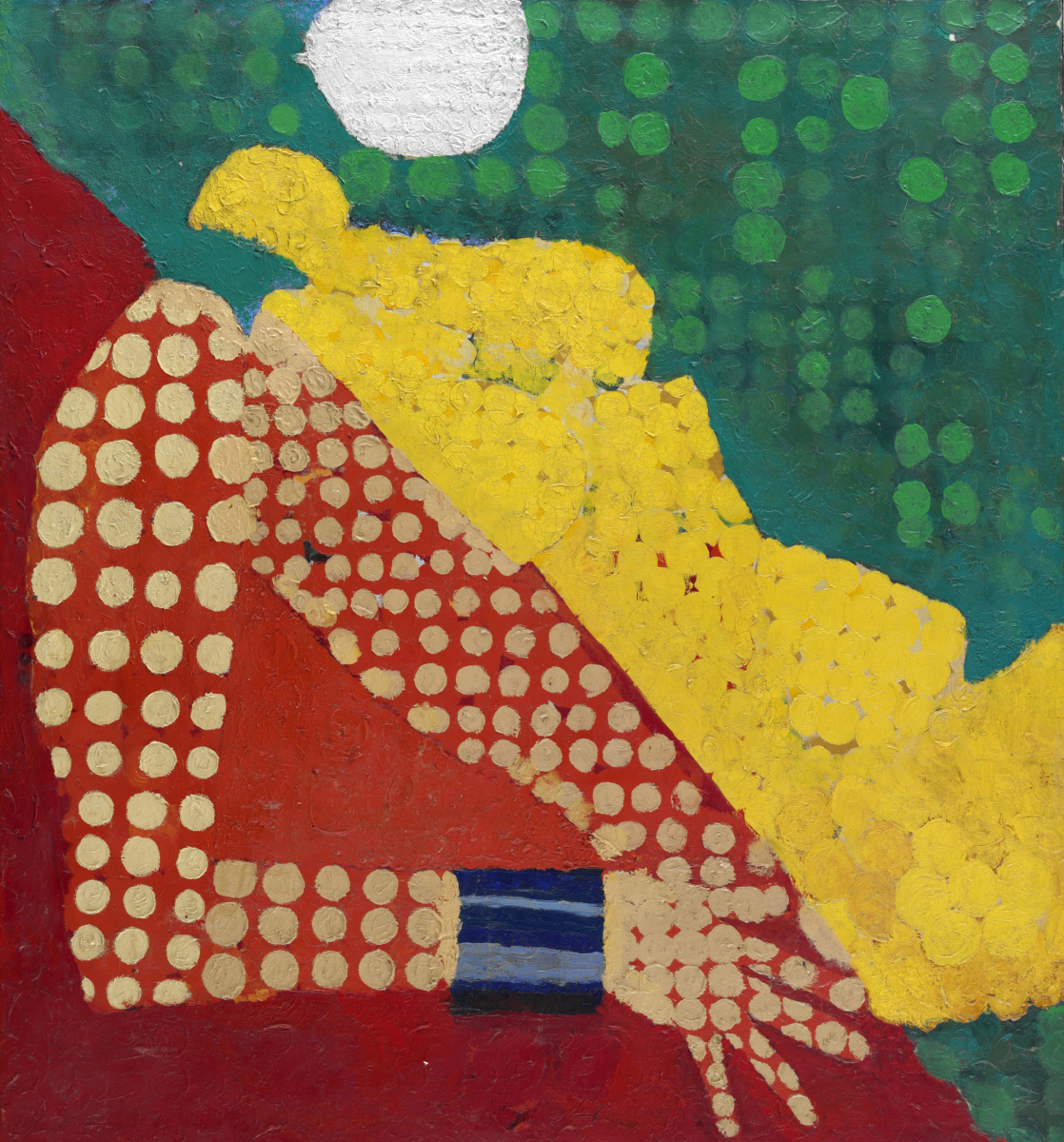
Blue Bracelet (1968)

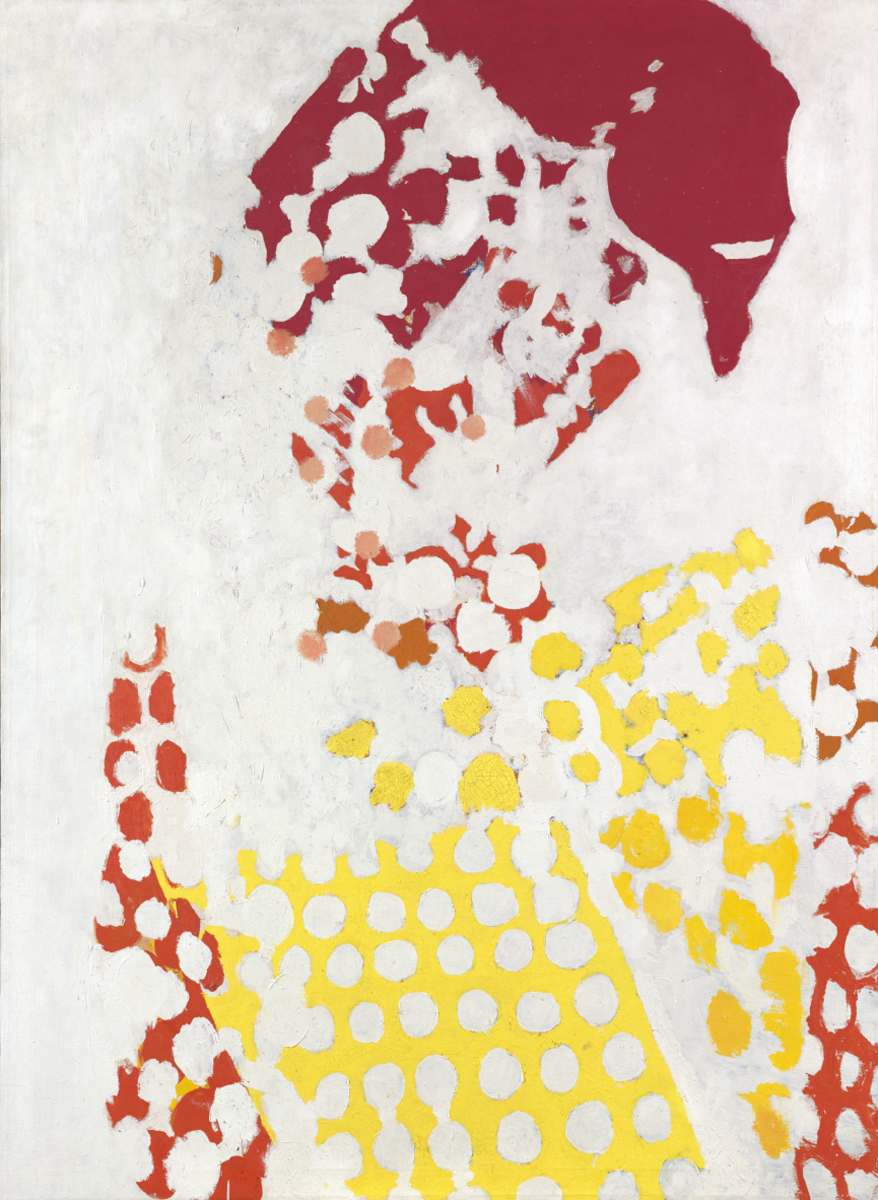
Onion (late 1960s)

The change in Slavík's painting style coincides with the onset of normalization. The rational construction of the painting, coupled with colour reductionism, became too cramped for him, and the figure, which had been an abstract subject, became a real figure carrying all the weight of life. Colour should continue to play a major role - to be an independent carrier of meaning, space and figure. Slavík himself defines his work as an attempt at a new colourism rather than a "new figuration".

The experience of the carrying capacity of the coloured sign, in conjunction with real subjects transcribed into colour, valorises the figure in a monumental, already purely corporeal way. In the paintings of the late 1960s, the joy of painting is fully developed (Lying, 1970, Onion, 1969). The patches of colour, and with them the figures, lose their contours (Reclining figure, 1970, 1972), sometimes disappearing completely (Blue Study, 1971, Sleeping, 1973). Slavík's painting in this period ranges widely from hints of architectural order (Interior II, 1973) to free abstraction (Fairy Tale, 1970–1971).

In the first half of the 1970s, the dynamic element of swirling circles and subtle light vibrations appears first in drawings (1972) and later in paintings executed in contrasting vibrant colours of reds and yellows (Composition, 1975). Before the mid-1970s, the painter suffered a creative crisis and destroyed a number of paintings.

The paintings of the second half of the 1970s already clearly demonstrate that Slavík makes use of colour as a self explanatory lyrical and expressive quality, to which he subordinates the composition of his paintings (Burning Snow, 1977, Bend Your Knees and Back, 1979, Hunched Man, 1979).

After the signing of Charter 77, StB harassment and a heart attack, new works were created - monumental apocalyptic landscapes and landscape themes inspired by trips to Šumava (Unsuccessful Attempt to Cross the Border, 1977–1979, Sunset, 1978) and emotional parables of the human fate in the series of (Tightrope Walkers), which Jirous categorizes as "imbosh art", the painting of hunted game (Note: Imbosh - The foam that comes from a mouth of hunted deer) (The Last Attempt to Cross the Border, 1979, Tightrope Walker in the Air, 1980).

Hunched Man in the Air (1979) depicts a hanged man. The titles of other works by Slavík from this period - The Tightrope Walker's Rest, The Tightrope Walker in the Air, The Tightrope Walker Before the Show, The Penultimate Rest - are images of camouflaged death, which the painter himself commented on as a violent and contrived evasive manoeuvre before an inevitable catastrophe. An illustration of the painter's state of mind is a picture painted shortly after his arrival in Austria, with muddy colours that stretch like smudges (Heimweh, 1980). The dark tones persist until 1981 (The Roaring Man).

Slavík continued his series of Tightrope walkers, archaic figures whose earthly existence the painter reflects on, even in exile in Vienna. The figures are expressed in several coloured surfaces, rhythmized by colour contrasts, and the painter's sculptural foundations are increasingly apparent. Slavík's expressionism originated in Prague and carries the existential burden he brought with him to Vienna (The Bent Tightrope Walker, 1987). In the free conditions of his new home and a happy personal relationship, the calm and balanced composition of colour tones return to his paintings. The female figure became the central motif of Slavík's paintings. These paintings glow with fiery tones of red and yellow, azure blue, and light that both illuminates and bathes the bodies and floats over them like water. After the fall of the communist regime in Czechoslovakia, Slavík presented his work at exhibitions in Prague and Brno.

After a retrospective exhibition at the National Gallery in 1991, further monumental works were created in which the painter explored the possibilities of colour to no end (Discomfort I, 1995). For the painter, the laying down of paint is an emotional process, expressing intensity, seriousness and very often also irony. Flickering, quivering brush strokes, heavy pastes, optical raster, hatching, and paper gluing serve as expressive and constructional devices tied to painting.

Slavík often returns to older paintings, which he subjects to painstaking and usually devastating interventions. For him, the process of painting is primary, not the result. His work is increasingly painstaking; the painter does not speculate on his abilities or rely on what he has achieved. According to the painter, "there are no finished paintings, only paintings deferred." Therefore, there are photographs of even several successive versions of a single painting in which a figure falls into space and emerges from it again. Apart from a series of head studies from the second half of the 1990s (Duňa, Vally, Zmatlík, Eugen in roses, Fright, 1996–1997), landscape and purely spatial compositions (Head, 2005, View from the Window, 2006) are appearing with increasing frequency. The paintings of the last few years seem to have emphasised even more sharply the painter's struggle with the image, the struggle between the subject - the object of the painting - and its background, which is becoming increasingly important. The reflective colours thematise joy, radiance and brightness, the torsos of the reclining girls are lost in thickets of colour, left to natural processes (Reclining Girl I-IV, 2008).

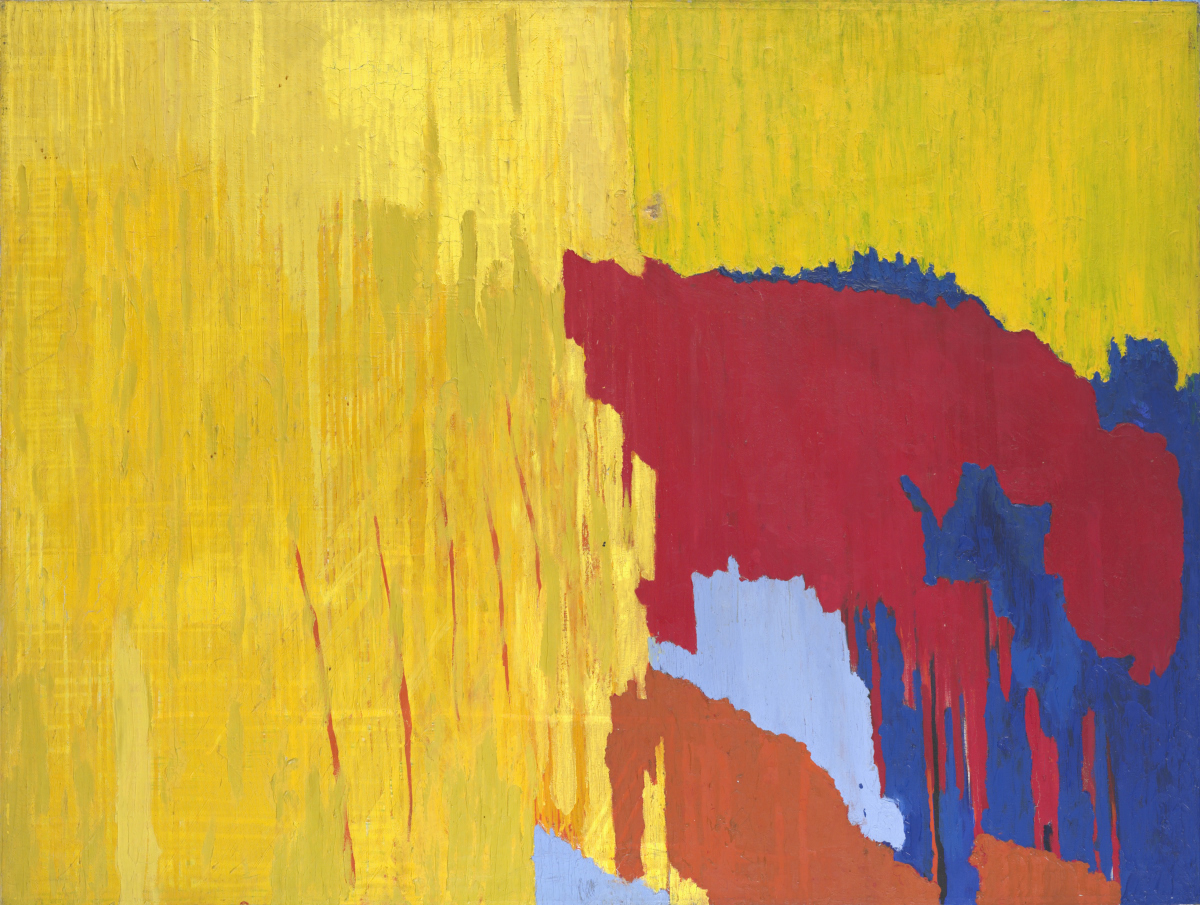
Bend Your Knees and Back (1976–78)

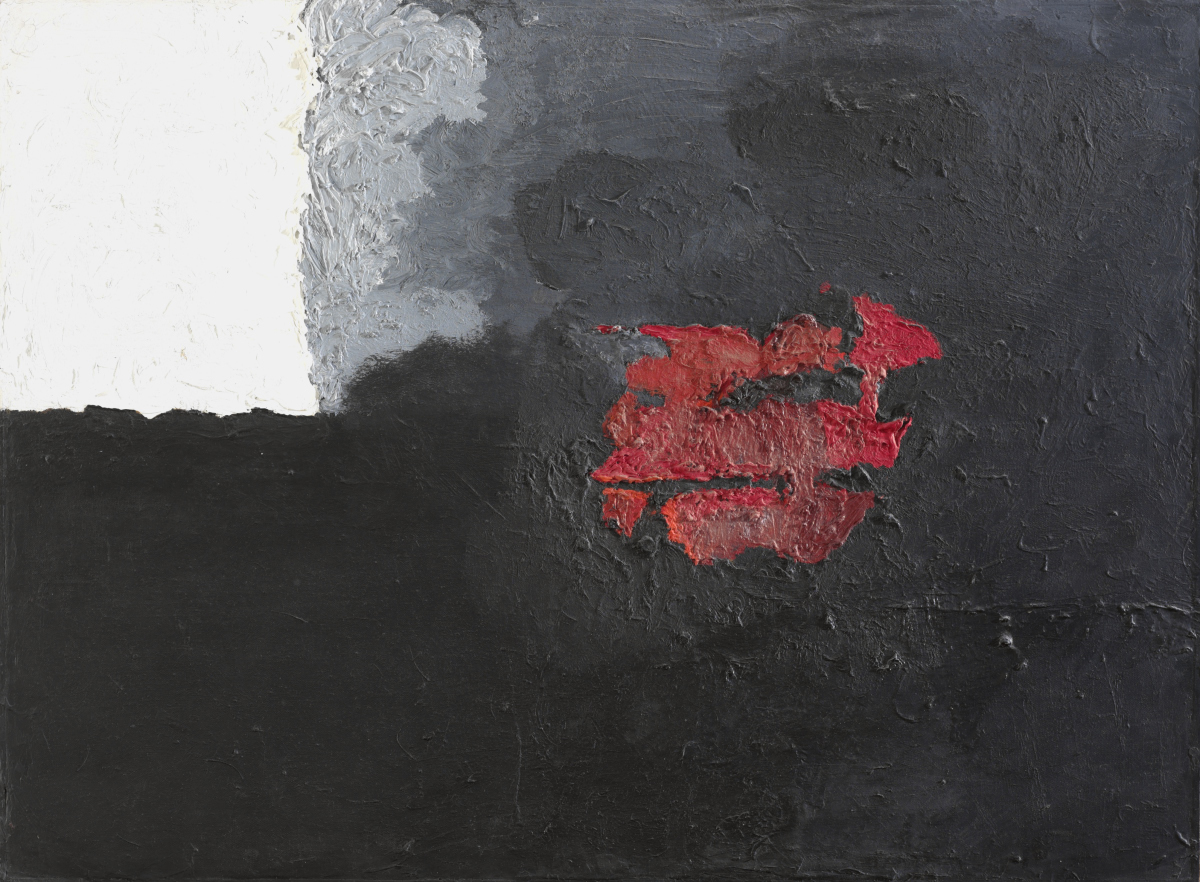
Sunset (1978)

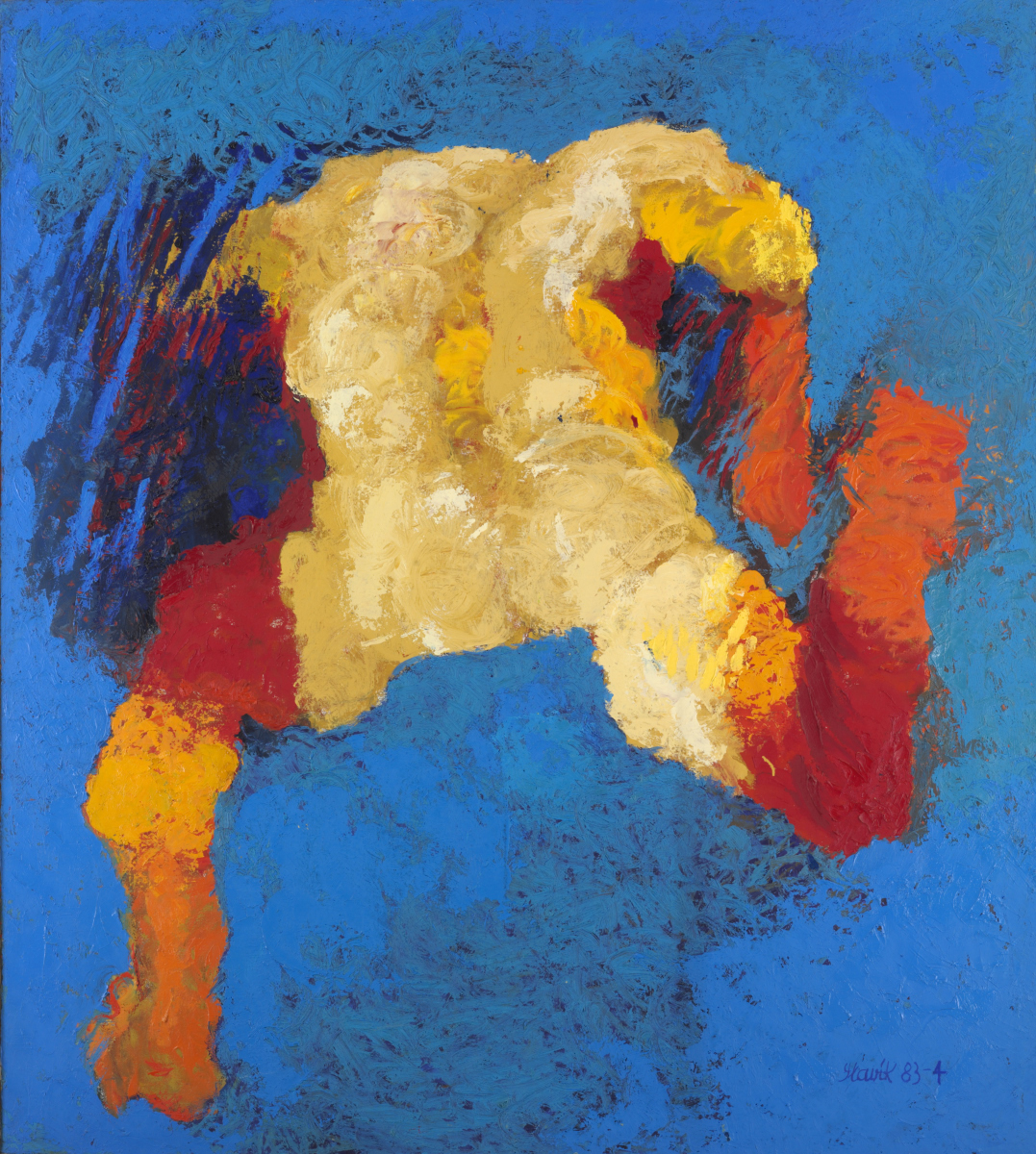
Nix wie weg from rope and in general (1983–84)

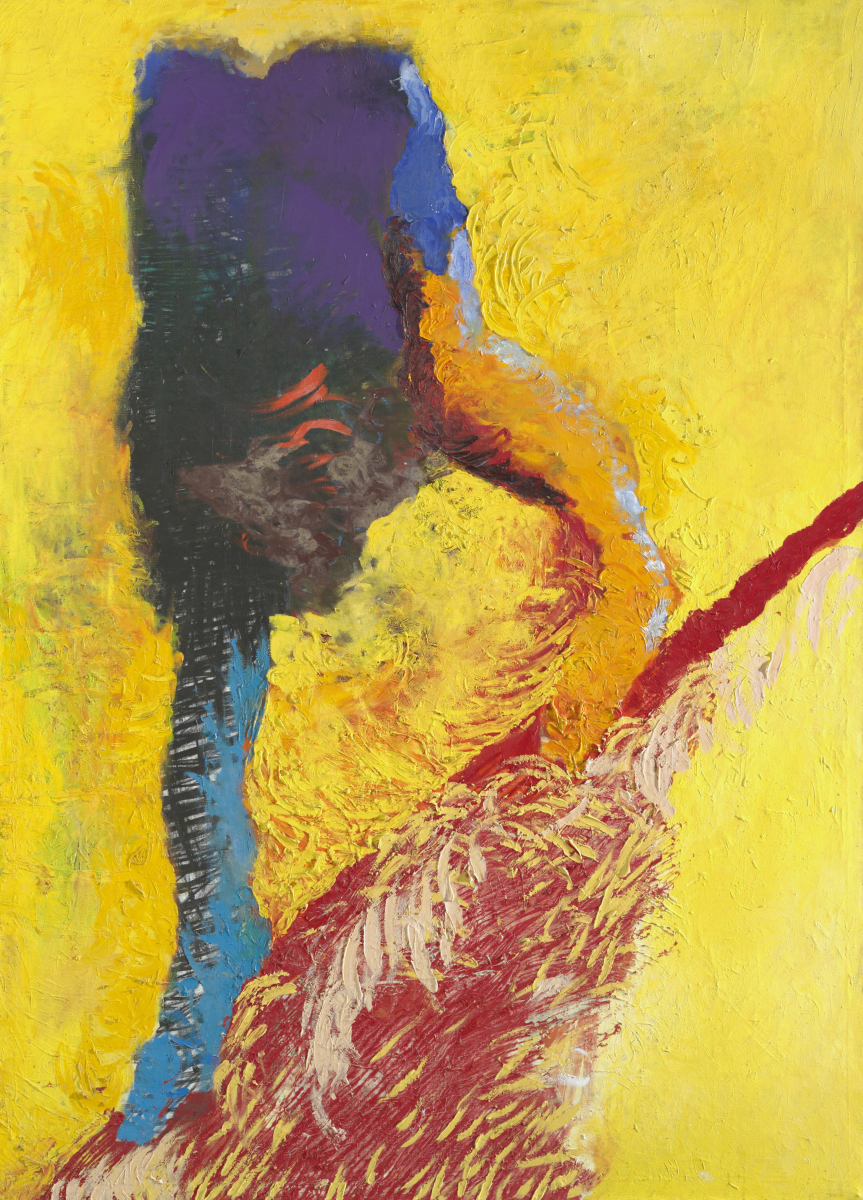
The Bent Tightrope Walker (1983–87)

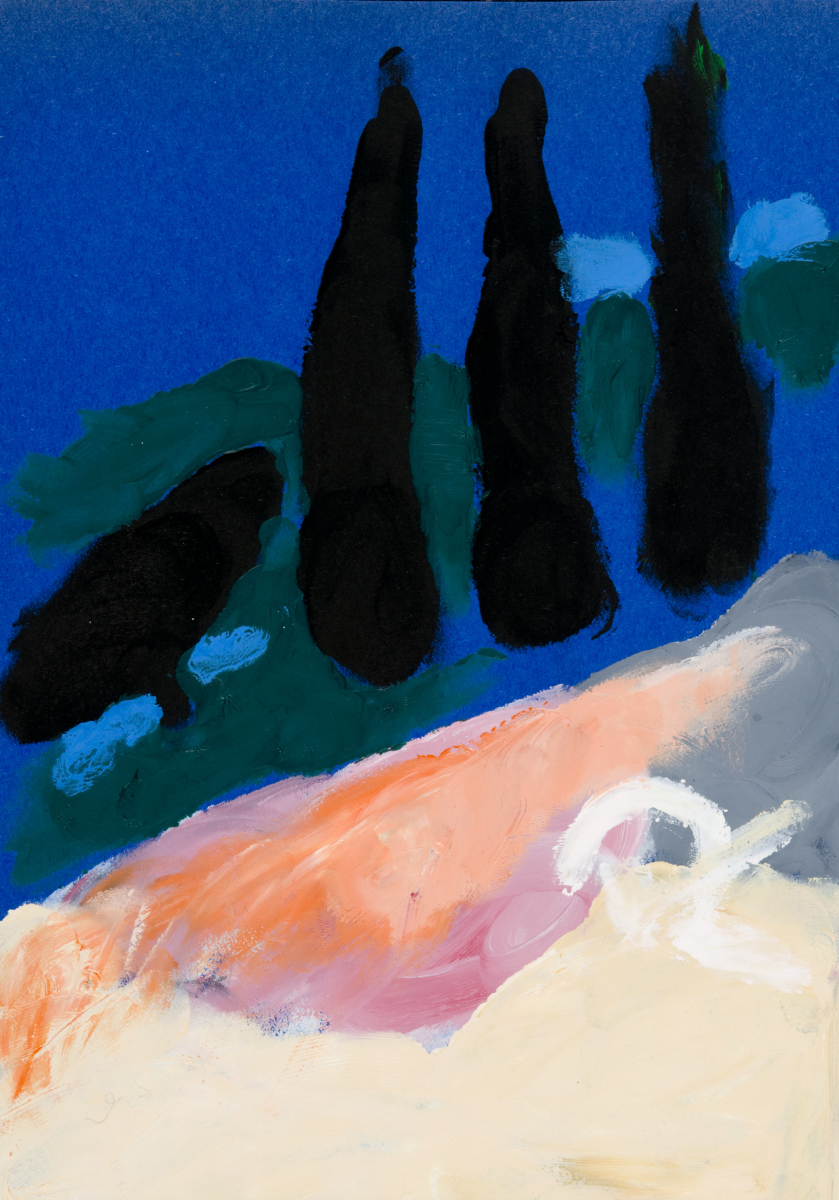
Tuscan Diary II (1986–1987)

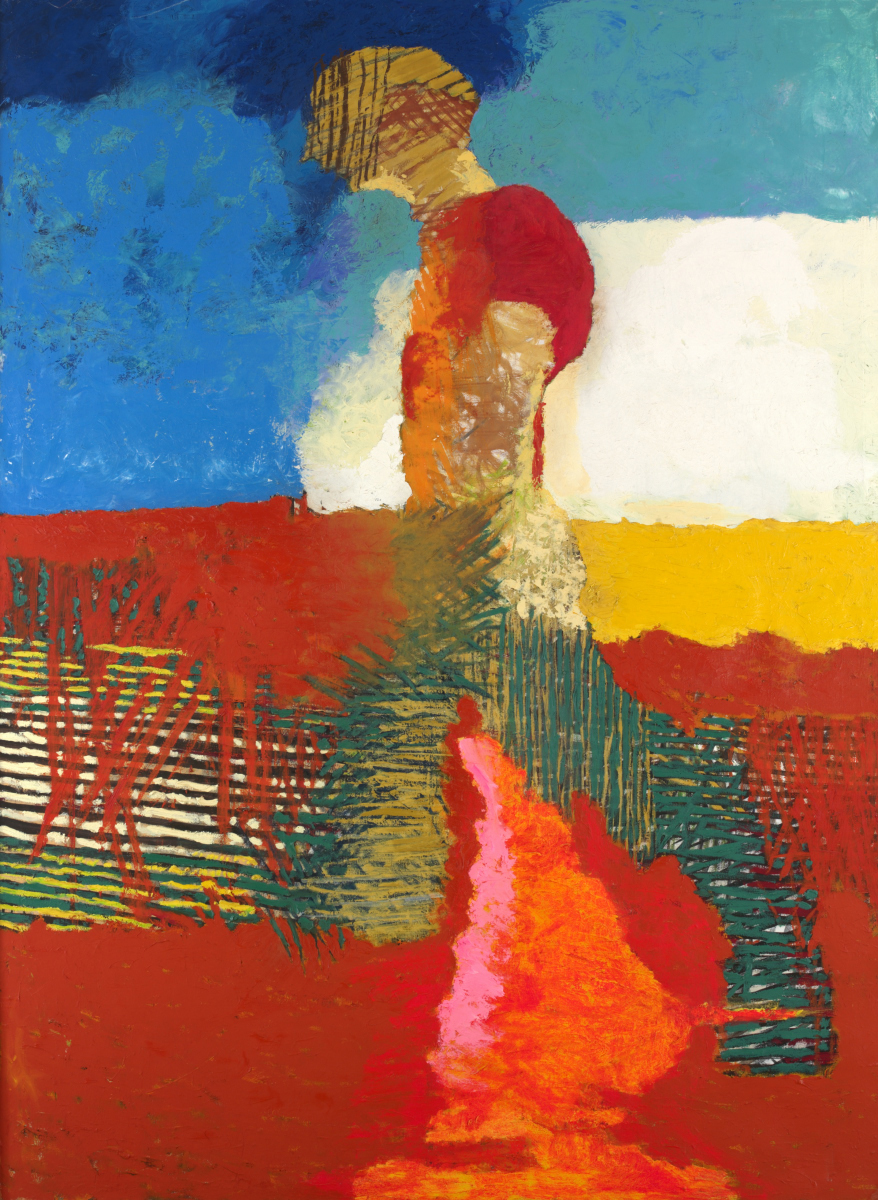
Walking Man (1988–89)

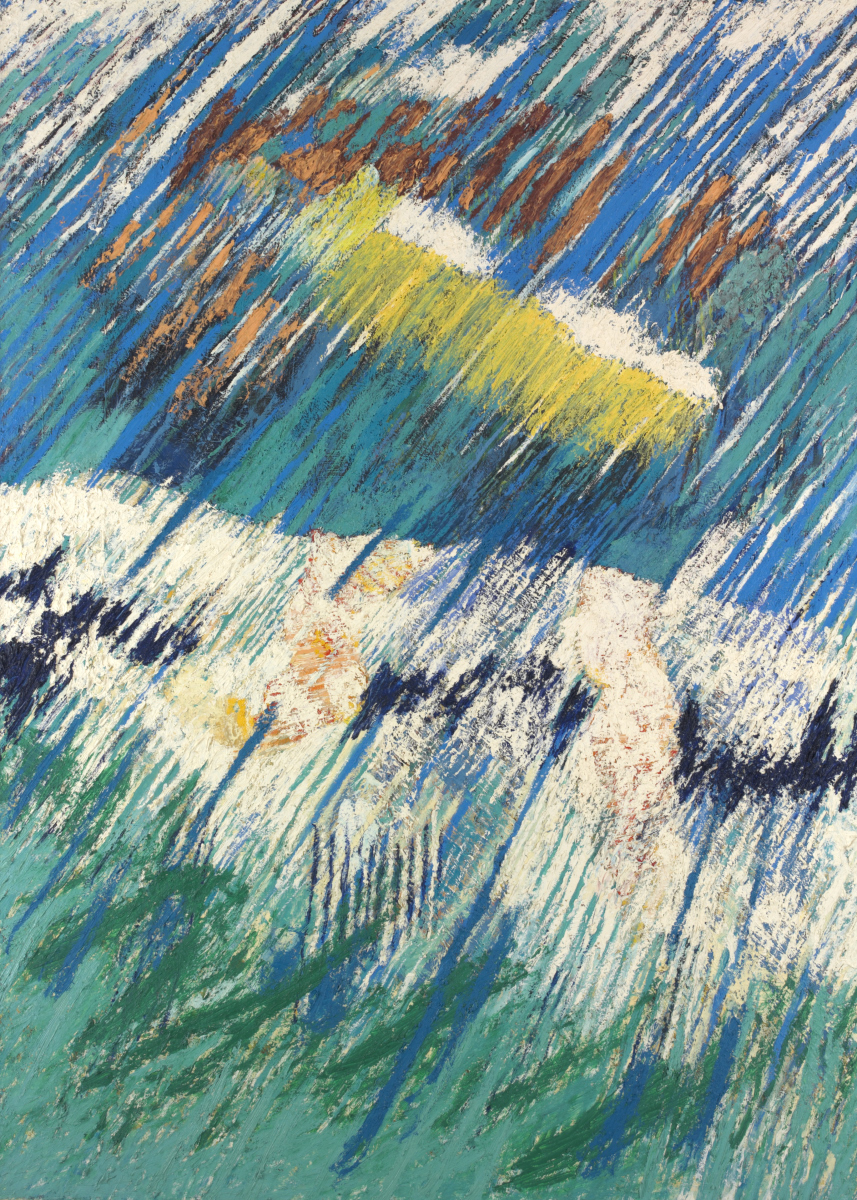
Bad Weather I (1989)

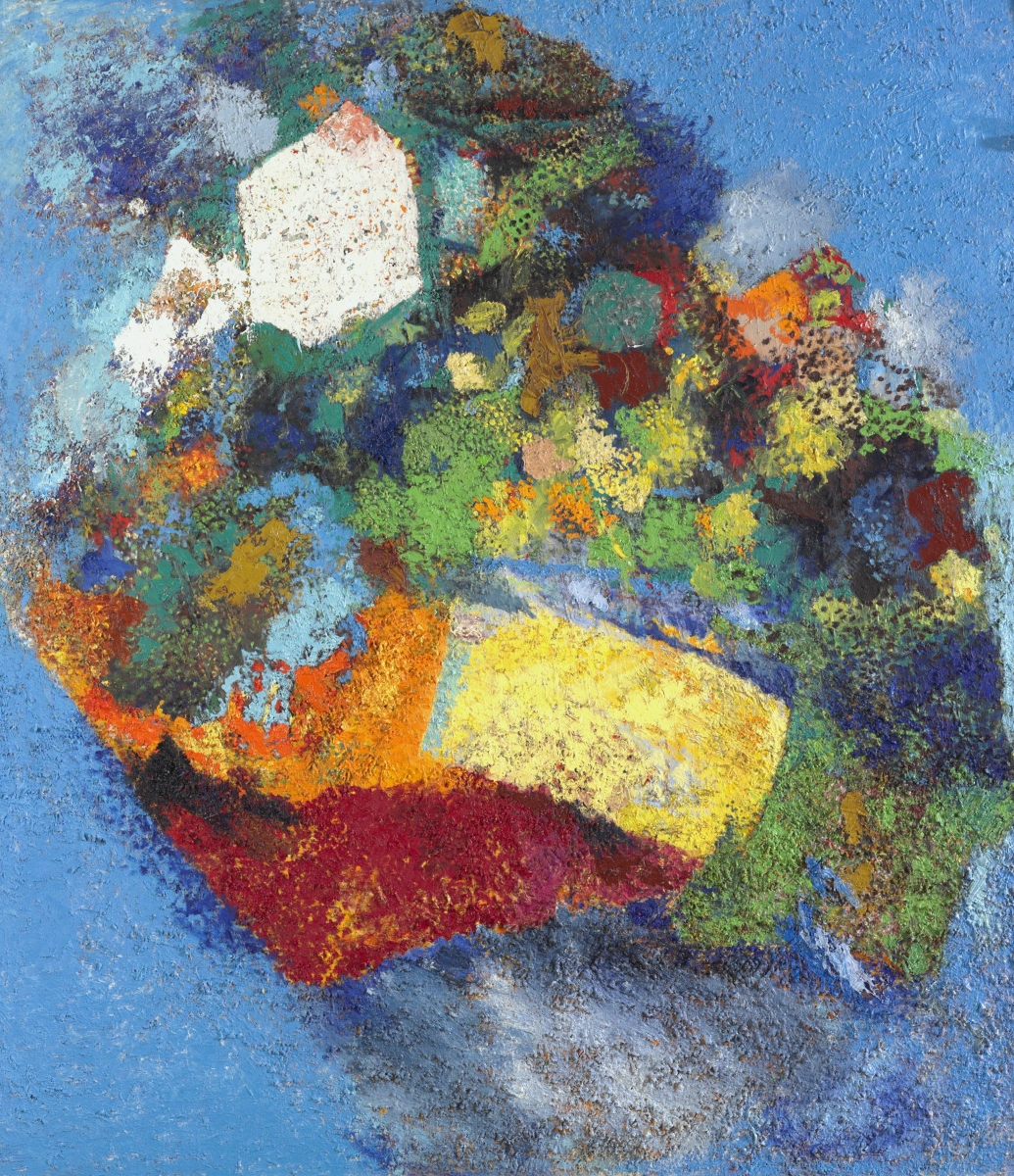
View from the Window (2006)

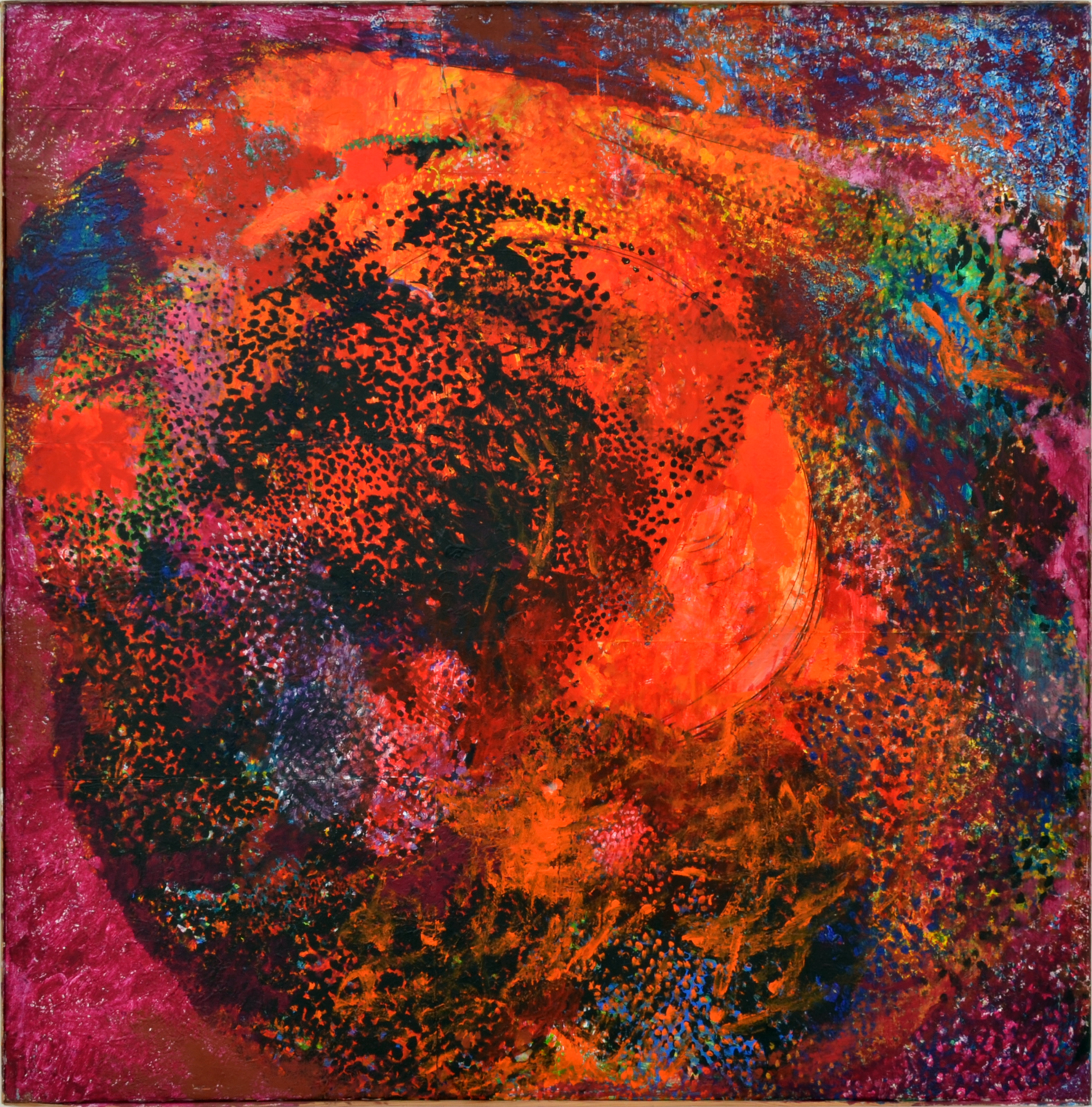
Red study 2000-2006

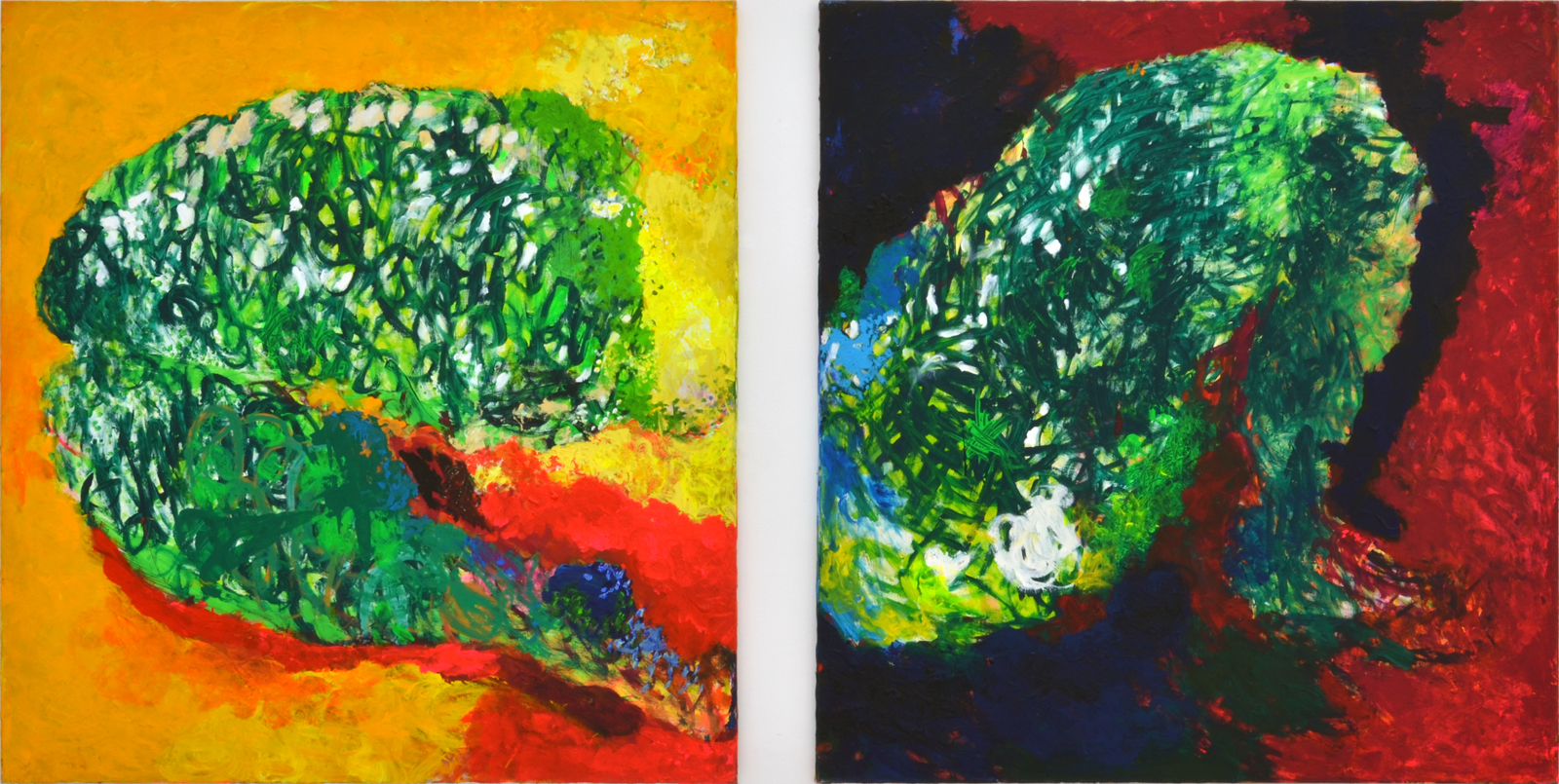
diptych Reclining Girl II (2008)

=== Drawings and prints ===
Drawing accompanies Slavík's painting periodically and is always related to an interest in a new problem and the search for a new solution. A series of large pencil drawings of male heads (Head, 1968) was exhibited in Slavík's first exhibition at the Václav Špála Gallery curated by Jindřich Chalupecký in 1968, and a series of 12 colour silkscreen prints of the Roaring Man in another exhibition in 1970. It was not until around 1974 that a collection of geometric, completely non-objective drawings followed, where figuration is replaced by the autonomy of lines and their volumes (Drawing, 1974). A series of figurative drawings from the 1980s, more like outlines and hints of figures drawn in pastel, often in combination with other techniques, were made alongside the paintings.

Slavík attended nude drawing courses in Vienna for almost twenty years. He is not at all shy about relearning the basics together with amateurs, so that he can, out of genuine personal necessity, invent, bring the past into the present, transform tradition into novelty. This is how a series of spontaneous snapshots and a series of illustrations of tightrope walkers for the French magazine La Nouvelle Alternative came about. (1990-1998). The drawings of human heads from the 1980s, often larger than life, are reduced to a few characteristics or are analogous to figural forms. From a trip to Tuscany taken by Duňa and Otakar Slavík and Ivan Binar with his wife, they compiled a joint illustrated diary (1986-1987).

=== Bibliography ===
- Slavík, Otakar (2018). Malířské smetí (deníkové záznamy) (in Czech). Prague: Nakladatelství Pulchra. ISBN 978-80-7564-032-1.

=== Representation in collections ===
- National Gallery in Prague
- Gallery of the City of Prague
- Museum Kampa
- Czech Museum of Fine Arts, Prague (now GASK)
- Benedikt Rejt Gallery, Louny
- North Bohemia Art Gallery in Litoměřice
- Gallery of Modern Art in Roudnice nad Labem
- Art Gallery Karlovy Vary
- Museum of Art Olomouc
- Gallery of Fine Arts in Ostrava
- Regional Gallery of Fine Arts in Zlín
- Alš South Bohemia Gallery in Hluboká nad Vltavou
- East Bohemia Gallery in Pardubice
- Gallery of Modern Art in Hradec Králové
- Regional Gallery in Liberec
- Gallery of Fine Arts in Cheb
- Regional Gallery of the Highlands in Jihlava
- Gallery Klatovy / Klenová
- Golden Goose Gallery
- Art Institute of Chicago
- Fond National d'Art Contemporain Paris
- Kunstforum Norrköping
- Kunstsammlung Chemnitz
- Galerie kulturnog centra, Beograd
- Stuka Museum, Lodz
- Wirtschaftskammer Innsbruck
- Private collections at home and abroad

=== Exhibitions ===
- 1964 Otakar Slavik: Paintings and Drawings, Small Gallery Lapidarium, Prague
- 1966 Otakar Slavík, Gallery of Youth, Mánes, Prague
- 1967/1968 Otakar Slavík, Václav Špála Gallery, Prague
- 1969 Otakar Slavik: Paintings 1962 - 1968, Letohrádek Ostrov
- 1970 Otakar Slavík: Paintings of Women, Benedikt Rejt Gallery, Louny
- 1970 Otakar Slavík: Paintings, Václav Špála Gallery, Prague
- 1975 Otakar Slavík, Minigallery VUVL, Brno
- 1983 Otakar Slavík, Galerie Kraus, Pffäfikon, Switzerland
- 1984 Otakar Slavik, Galerie Schröder, Mönchengladbach
- 1984 Otakar Slavik: Le funambule de prague, Université de Toulouse-Le Mirail
- 1985 Otakar Slavik, Galerie Ekymose, Bordeaux
- 1985 Otakar Slavik, Galerie Asperger Bischoff, Chicago
- 1987 Otakar Slavík, Galerie Wolf, Düsseldorf
- 1987 Otakar Slavík: Zeichnungen, Kinogalerie des Künstlerhauses, Vienna
- 1989 Otakar Slavik: Malerei, St. Peter an der Sperr, Vienna
- 1989 Otakar Slavik, French Cultural Institute, Vienna
- 1991 Otakar Slavik: Drawings, Na bidýlku Gallery, Brno
- 1991/1992 Otakar Slavik: Paintings and Drawings, National Gallery and City Library, Prague
- 1992 Otakar Slavík, Galerie Irus et Vincent Hansma, Paris
- 1993/1994 Otakar Slavík: Paintings, Künstlerhaus Wien, Vienna
- 1997 Otakar Slavík: Paintings, Mánes, Prague
- 1999 Otakar Slavík: Praise of the Tower, Bayer & Bayer Gallery, Mostecká 16, Prague
- 2001 Otakar Slavík: Paintings, Prague Castle Ballroom, Prague
- 2002 Otakar Slavík, Exhibition Hall Sokolská 26, Ostrava
- 2003 Otakar Slavík: Women, Via Art Gallery, Prague
- 2003 Otakar Slavík: Paintings from Vienna, Sankturin House, Kutná Hora
- 2003/2004 Otakar Slavík: Paintings, Objects, Galerie kai de kai, Prague
- 2005 Otakar Slavík: Kočka v křesle / Cat in the Armchair, Gallery Via Art, Prague
- 2007 Slavík 75, Nová síň Gallery, Prague
- 2009 Otakar Slavík: Returns, Topičův salon (2007-) Prague
- 2010 Otakar Slavík: Babí léto, Via Art Gallery, Prague
- 2010 Otakar Slavík: Paint for Life, Gallery of Modern Art in Roudnice nad Labem,
- 2012 Otakar Slavík: Dvě dominanty 60/80 / Two Dominants, Museum Kampa, Prague
- 2014/2015 Otakar Slavík: Nudes, Czech Centre Vienna[4] Archived July 2, 2017 at the Wayback Machine
- Collective exhibitions - see abART
