= Andrysiak =

Andrysiak is a Polish language surname from the personal name Andrew. Notable people with the name include:

- Lucyna Andrysiak (1955–2017), Polish politician
- Terry Andrysiak (1965), former American football quarterback
