= Sikora =

Sikora (Polish pronunciation: [ɕiˈkɔra]) is a surname of Polish language origin. It is related to the Czech and Slovak surname Sýkora. All are derived from a Slavic word for birds of the Paridae (tit) family, which was used as a nickname for a small, agile person.

== People ==
- Adrian Sikora (born 1980), Polish footballer
- Dariusz Sikora (born 1958), Polish ice hockey player
- Elżbieta Sikora (born 1943), Polish composer
- Éric Sikora (born 1968), French footballer
- Franz Sikora (1863–1902), Austrian explorer
- Jorge Sikora (born 2002), Polish footballer
- Joseph Sikora (born 1976), American actor
- Kacper Sikora (born 1992), Polish singer
- Karol Sikora (born 1948), British oncologist
- Kate Sikora (born 1980), American singer songwriter
- Krzysztof Gustaw Sikora (born 1954), Polish politician—chairperson of the Kuyavian-Pomeranian Regional Assembly
- Krzysztof Ryszard Sikora (born 1959), Polish politician—member of Polish Sejm V Term (2005–2007)
- Megan Sikora (born 1977), American actress
- Mieczysław Sikora (born 1982), Polish footballer
- Petr Sikora (born 2006), Czech ice hockey player
- Rafał Sikora (born 1987), Polish athlete
- Roman Sikora (born 1970), Czech playwright
- Shane Sikora (born 1977), Australian rules footballer
- Tomasz Sikora (born 1973), Polish biathlete
- Victor Sikora (born 1978), Dutch footballer

== See also ==
- Sikorski (disambiguation)
