= Sikorski =

Sikorski (feminine: Sikorska, plural: Sikorscy) is a Polish-language surname. It belongs to several noble Polish–Lithuanian Commonwealth families, see Sikorski families. Variants (via other languages) include Sikorsky, Sikorskyi, Sikorskiy, and Shikorsky.

There are several possible origins of the surname. It may originate from the numerous Polish locations named Sikory and literally it is an adjective meaning "of Sikory"/"from Sikory". Other possible locations of origin include Sikorzyn, Sikorz, Sikorze, Sikorycze. Still another origin is from the nickname Sikora, with the main meaning "tit" (bird) and several figurative meanings in Polish.

Notable people with this surname include:

- Ada Fighiera Sikorska, Polish Esperantist
- Aleksandra Sikorska, Polish volleyball player
- Andrzej Sikorski (born 1961), Polish cyclist
- Bobo Sikorski (1927 – 2014), Canadian football player
- Brian Sikorski (born 1974), American baseball player
- Daniel Sikorski (born 1987), Austrian footballer
- Franciszek Sikorski (1889–1940), Polish engineer and general
- Gerry Sikorski, American politician and lawyer
- Hans Sikorski, the founder of Hans Sikorski, music publishing house in Hamburg, Germany
- Igor Sikorski (skier), German-born Polish male paralympic alpine skier
- Igor Ivanovich Sikorsky, a Ukrainian-born pioneer in helicopters and fixed-wing aircraft; founder of Sikorsky Aircraft in Stratford, Connecticut
- Jerzy Sikorski (born 1935), Polish historian and writer
- Jolanta Sikorska-Kulesza (born 1957), Polish historian
- Kazimierz Sikorski (1895–1986), Polish composer
- Kenneth Sikorski (born 1959 or 1960), American-born Finnish blogger
- Krystian Sikorski, Polish ice hockey player
- Michał Sikorski (born 1995), Polish actor
- Radosław Sikorski (born 1963), Polish politician and statesman
- Roman Sikorski (1920–1983), Polish mathematician
- Tomasz Sikorski (1939 – 1988), Polish composer and pianist
- Władysław Sikorski (1881–1943), Polish general and Prime Minister in exile during World War II

Fictional characters

- Rudolf Sikorski, fictional character in several Strugatskys' novels
