= Průcha =

Průcha (feminine Průchová) is a Czech surname, it may refer to:

- Francis Paul Prucha (1921–2015), American Jesuit and historian
- Jaroslav Průcha (1898–1963), Czech actor
- Jindřich Prucha (1886–1914), Czech landscape painter
- Jiří Průcha (born 1955), Czech tennis player
- Petr Průcha (born 1982), Czech ice hockey player
- Vlasta Průchová (1926–2006), Czech jazz singer
