= Vacátko =

Vacátko is a surname. Notable people with the surname include:

- Ludvík Vacátko (1873–1956), Czechoslovak painter
- Vladimír Vacátko (1952–2016), German ice hockey player
