= Sýkora =

Sýkora (feminine: Sýkorová) is a surname of Czech and Slovak language origin. It is related to the Polish surname Sikora. All are derived from a Slavic word for birds of the Paridae (tit) family which was used as a nickname for a small, agile person.

Notable people with the surname include:

- Adam Sýkora (born 2004), Slovak ice hockey player
- Adéla Sýkorová (born 1987), Czech sport shooter
- Fiete Sykora (born 1982), German footballer
- Ján Sýkora (born 1990), Slovak ice hockey player
- Jan Sýkora (born 1993), Czech footballer
- Jana Sýkorová (born 1973), Czech opera singer
- Ken Sykora (1923–2006), British jazz guitarist
- Marie Sýkorová (1952–2018), Czech field hockey player
- Michal Sýkora (born 1973), Czech ice hockey player
- Peter Sykora (born 1946), German footballer
- Petr Sýkora (born 1976), Czech ice hockey player
- Petr Sýkora (born 1978), Czech ice hockey player
- Stacy Sykora (born 1977), American volleyball player
- Thomas Sykora (born 1968), Austrian alpine skier
- Tibor Sýkora (born 1938), Czech slalom canoeist
- Tom Sykora (born 1946), American politician
- Travis Sykora (born 2004), American baseball player
- Zdeněk Sýkora (1920–2011), Czech artist

== See also ==
- Sikorski (disambiguation)
