= Ludvík Vacátko =

Czech painter

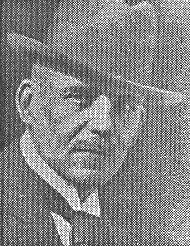
- Born: 19 August 1873; Simmering, Austria-Hungary
- Died: 26 November 1956 (aged 83); Kunvald, Czechoslovakia
- Occupation: Painter

Ludvík Vacátko (19 August 1873 – 26 November 1956) was a Czech painter. He focused on animal painting.

== Life ==
Vacátko was born on 19 August 1873 in Simmering (today a district of Vienna). His family moved to Prague when he was a child. In 1895–1901, he studied at the Academy of Fine Arts in Prague under professors Václav Brožík and Vojtěch Hynais. He excelled in figure painting and compositions of battle scenes, which is why Luděk Marold chose him in 1897 to collaborate on the large panorama of the Battle of Lipany (the largest Czech painting to date) and gave him the task of painting horses. Vacátko then completed his education at the Munich Academy and shortly also in Vienna and Paris. In France, he became more familiar with French modern art.

Vacátko thoroughly studied animal anatomy and focused on animal painting. He published a textbook focusing on this topic. He opened a private painting school in Prague, and Jindřich Prucha was among his students. Vacátko was entrusted with the equestrian portrait of Czechoslovak President Tomáš Garrigue Masaryk with his favourite horse Hektor, which Vacátko considered a great honour.

From 1943, Vacátko lived in Kunvald. He probably wanted to live in the countryside to be closer to the animals he painted. He died in Kunvald on 26 November 1956 and was buried in Pardubice.

Vacátko's work was part of the painting event in the art competition at the 1932 Summer Olympics.
