= Vojtěch Hynais =

Czech painter (1854–1925)

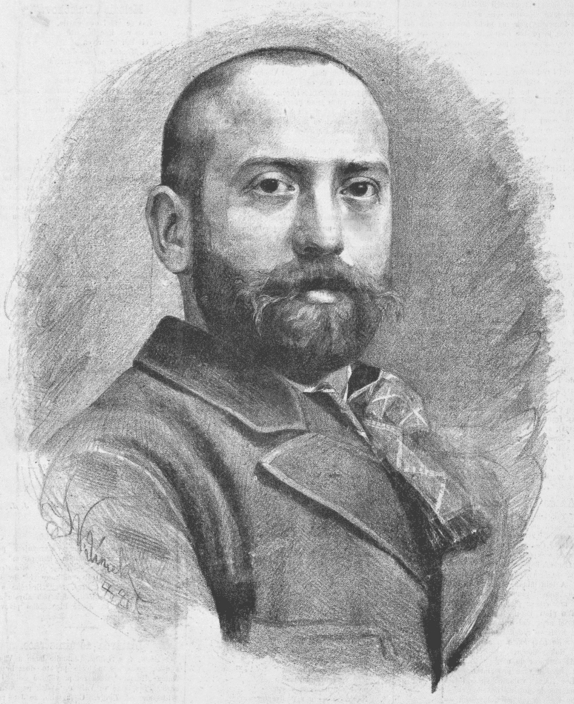
1881 portrait by Jan Vilímek.

Vojtěch Adalbert Hynais (also Albert; 14 January 1854 – 22 August 1925) was a Czech painter, designer and graphics artist. He designed the curtain of the Prague National Theatre, decorated a number of buildings in Prague and Vienna, and was a founding member of the Vienna Secession. He was made an Officer of the Légion d'honneur in 1924.

== Life ==
Hynais was born in Vienna; his father was a Czech tailor who had moved to the city, and did not want his children to receive a German education, so Hynais was taught at home. He began studying at the Academy of Fine Arts, Vienna in 1870, under Carl Wurzinger and August Eisenmenger, then at Anselm Feuerbach's school in spring 1873; he was considered to be one of his most promising students. He visited Italy and saw Rome in 1874 with Janez Šubic and again 1877 with Feuerbach.

Hynais lived in Paris from 1878 to 1893, where he learnt from Paul-Jacques-Aimé Baudry and Jean-Léon Gérôme, and knew Alfons Mucha. In 1885, he received an honorable mention from the 1885 Universal Exhibition of Fine Arts, and a first-class medal at the 1889 World's Fair. He married his wife, Augusta Voirinová, in Paris, with whom he had two children.

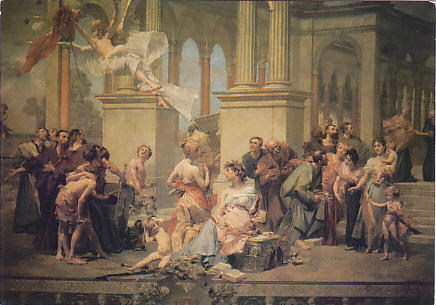
The curtain of the Prague National Theatre, painted by Hynais in 1883.

During the 1870s, art was being produced to decorate the under-construction Prague National Theatre. Hynais was not considered to be suitably representative of the national spirit by Czech art critics because he lived in, and had absorbed too much influence from, Vienna. Still, he created nationalist images for the Royal Lounge, including allegorical, historico-mythic scenes and landscapes of Bohemia.

On 12 August 1881, one month before the National Theatre's scheduled opening, a fire completely destroyed the building. Hynais designed the new curtain; again, he used historical allegory to create a nationalist impression, and also to tell the story of the National Theatre. Slavia, the national embodiment, is shown receiving gifts from the nation; workers rebuild the theatre, while artists decorate it; national flags and symbols are shown all around. Hynais had made the first sketches for the curtain while living in Montmartre; the winged figure is modelled on Suzanne Valadon. Hynais's work for the National Theatre is what he is mostly remembered for; he was part of the "Generation of the National Theatre" together with Mikoláš Aleš, Václav Brožík, Julius Mařák and František Ženíšek, among others. The work's style was likened to his teacher Feurbach's.

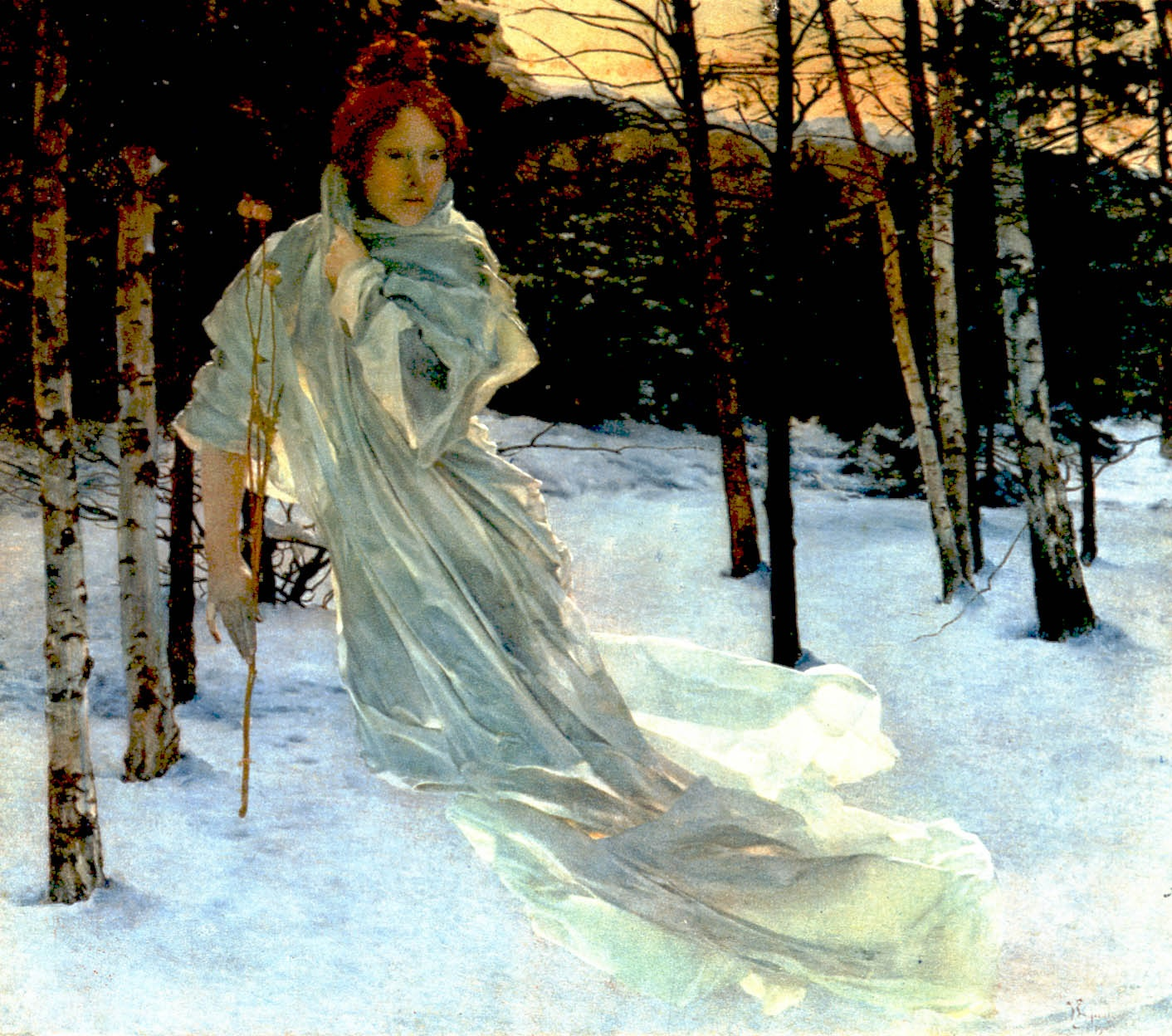
Winter (c. 1890).

Hynais created the first poster for the General Land Centennial Exhibition of 1891, using distinctively Czech symbols prominently in the design; the poster would earn him recognition. Tomáš Masaryk, the President of Czechoslovakia, sat for him ninety-four times. In 1894, his work won a medal, first class, at the Antwerp World's Fair.

Hynais worked for the Sèvres porcelain firm between 1889 and 1892 as a graphics artist, and became a professor at the Academy of Fine Arts, Prague in 1894.

While living in Prague, Hynais was a founding member of the Vienna Secession. Emil Orlik and Maximilian Pirner were other important Secessionists in the city.

In 1900, together with two of his students, Hynais painted the ceiling of the Pantheon in the Royal State Museum, Prague; Hynais's parts in particular were described as being "the best of what was created in the whole vast building and perhaps in all of Prague".

In 1923, he was made an Officer of the Légion d'honneur, and in 1924 was granted an honorary professorship at the Prague Academy.

Hynais died in Prague in 1925.

== Work ==
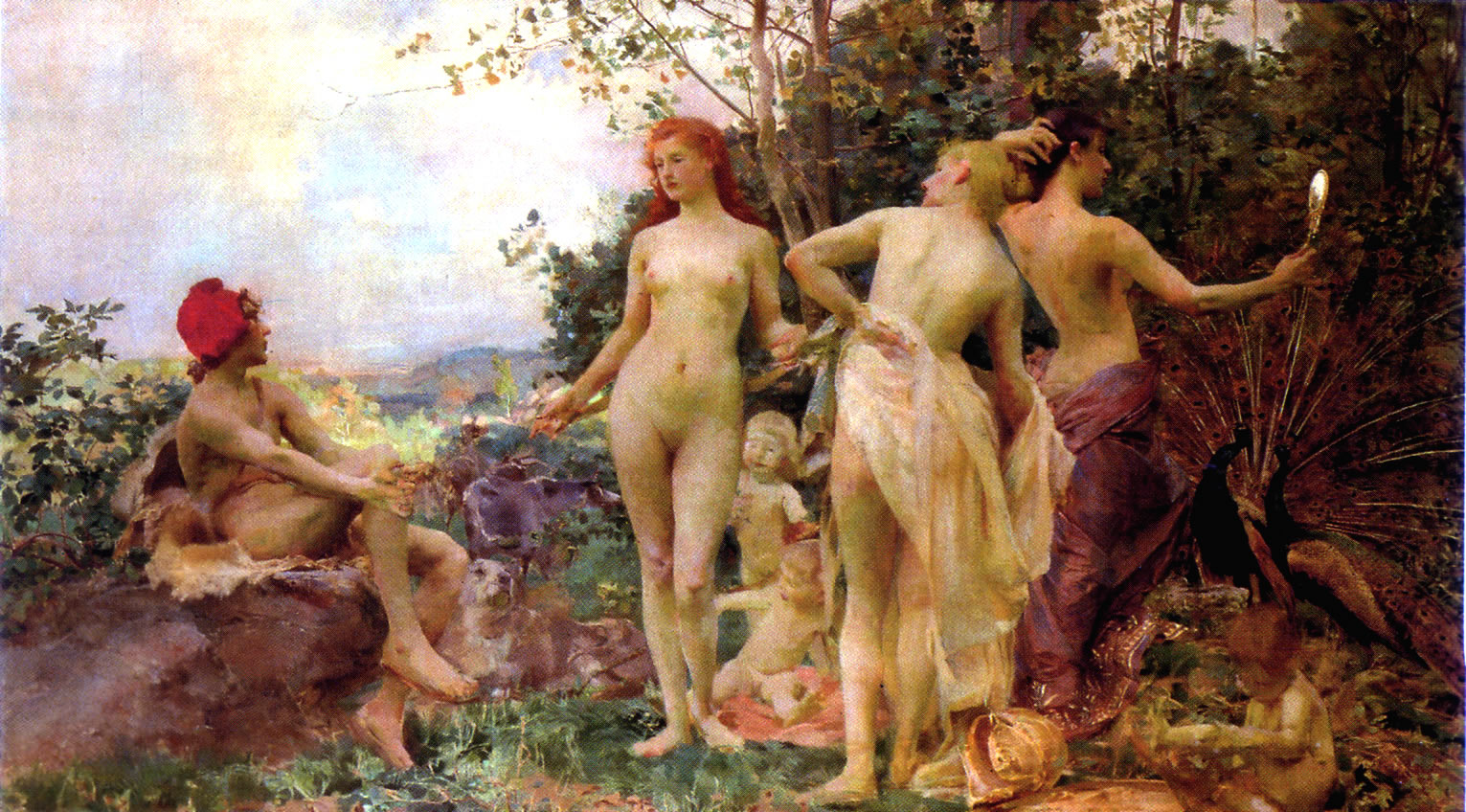
The Judgment of Paris (1892), which features a nude, red-haired Venus as a harbinger of both vitality and danger.

During his Italian period, he painted mainly religious and mythological images, including for the Czech Hospice in Rome. From Paris, he brought the Czech Art Nouveau artists into contact with foreign influences; he, himself, was a Symbolist influence, and also a point of contact with proto-Impressionism. Hynais was part of a broader axis of connection between Paris and Prague at the turn of the century: other Czech artists living in the city in the period included Alfons Mucha, František Kupka and Luděk Marold, among others.

Hynais was interested in integrating the human and the natural, and particularly female nudes. He was described as "a delicate poet depicting the beauty of the female body." Hynais also bound together religious and aesthetic considerations. He did, however, maintain some distance between his decorative-poetic work and his political-nationalist work.
