= Lucyna Andrysiak =

Polish politician

Chairperson of the Kuyavian-Pomeranian Regional Assembly
- In office September 2000 – November 2006
- Preceded by: ?
- Succeeded by: Krzysztof Sikora

Member of Kuyavian-Pomeranian Regional Assembly from 2 district
- Incumbent
- Assumed office 1999

Personal details
- Born: 2 January 1955 Poland
- Died: 6 December 2017 (aged 62)
- Party: Democratic Left Alliance

Lucyna Mieczysława Andrysiak (2 January 1955 – 6 December 2017) was a Polish politician who was a Member of Kuyavian-Pomeranian Regional Assembly and a former Assembly Chairperson (2000–06).

In 1998 Polish local election she joined the Regional Assembly I term representing the 2nd district. From September 2000 to December 2017 she was Assembly Chairperson (Przewodniczący Sejmiku Województwa Kujawsko-Pomorskiego).

In 2002 election she was elected again. She polled 5,404 votes and was first on the Democratic Left Alliance-Labor Union list. Assembly II term elected her as Assembly Chairperson again.

In 2006 election she was elected for a third time. She scored 3,950 votes, running on the Left and Democrats list.

She died on 6 December 2017 at the age of 62.

== See also ==
- Kuyavian-Pomeranian Regional Assembly
