= Luděk Marold =

Czech illustrator and painter (1865–1898)

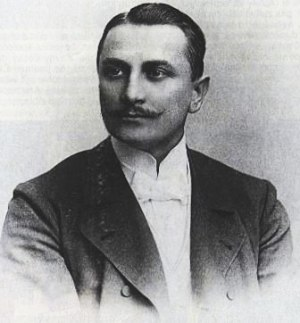
Luděk Marold. (date unknown)

Luděk Alois Marold (7 August 1865, Prague – 1 December 1898, Prague) was a Czech painter and illustrator, best known for his panorama depicting the Battle of Lipany. It is the largest painting in the Czech Republic and currently has its own pavilion at the Výstaviště exhibition grounds.

== Biography ==
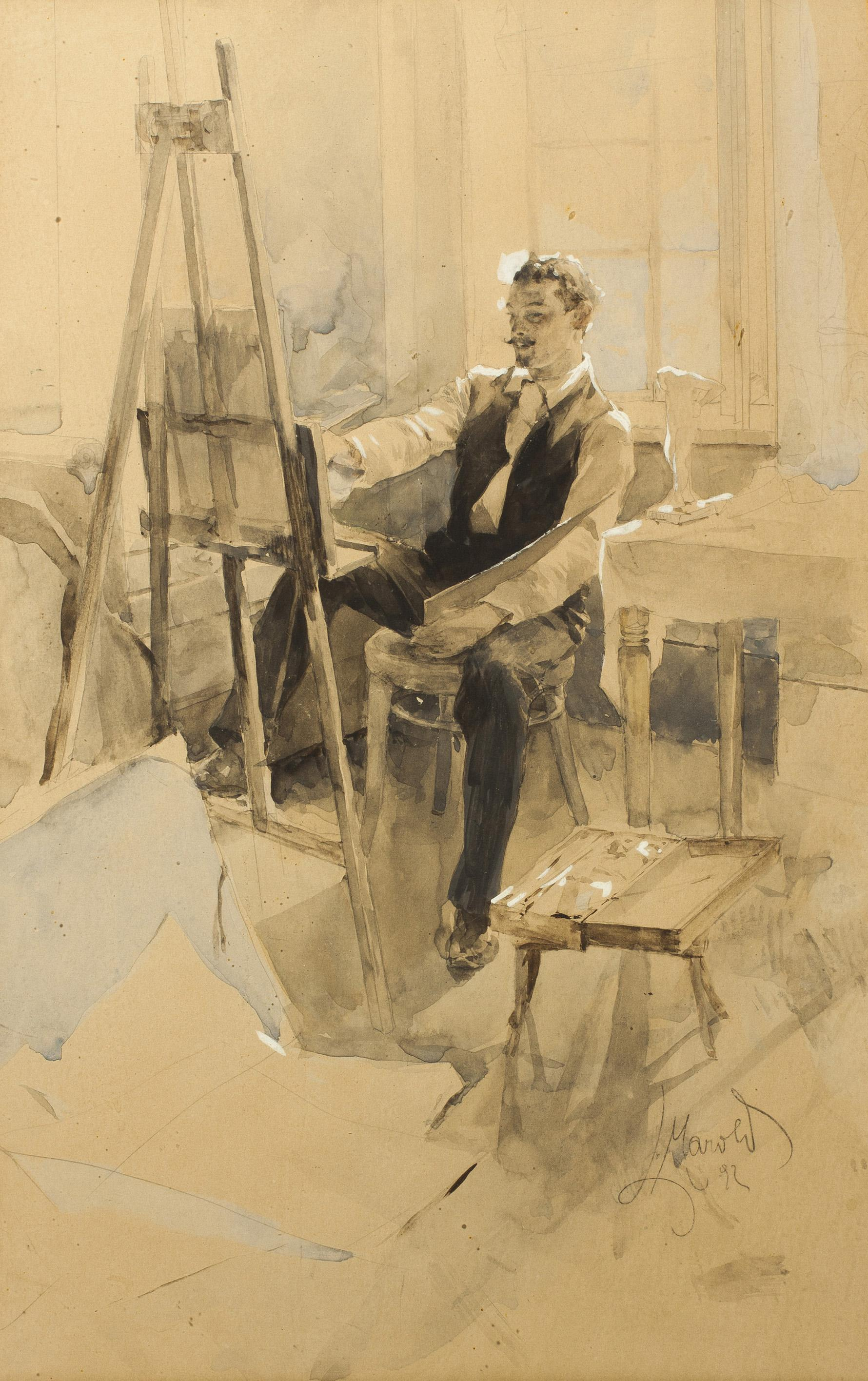
The Artist in His Studio (1892)

He was born out of wedlock and given his mother's surname. His father, an Army Lieutenant, was killed the following year during the Austro-Prussian War and his mother died six years later. The next nine years of his life are largely undocumented, although he apparently tried to enter Cadet School, but failed the examinations. At the age of sixteen, he entered the Academy of Fine Arts, but remained for only a year and was expelled.

His studies did not resume until 1881, when he enrolled at the Academy of Fine Arts, Munich, where his instructors were Ludwig von Löfftz and Nikolaos Gysis. While there, he exchanged ideas with other Czech painters such as Mikoláš Aleš and Alfons Mucha. His first professional successes came as an illustrator for several German and Czech magazines, such as Světozor.

During this time, he began to suffer from rheumatic fever so, in 1887, he returned to Prague, where he worked in the studios of Maximilian Pirner and edited publications from the newly established Mánes Union of Fine Arts, headed by his old friend Aleš. Two years later, he received a state scholarship to study in Paris, where he found a position in the studios of Pierre-Victor Galland. In 1891, he was married. The following year, after Galland's death, he gave up his scholarship to become a freelance artist. He continued to create illustrations for periodicals and books by Czech authors and received a gold medal at an exhibition in Munich in 1892. Later, he adopted the Art Nouveau style and began receiving orders for posters. In 1895, he was elected a member of the "Czech Academy of Arts and Sciences".

By 1897, he was back in Prague, where he proposed creating a gigantic panorama of the Battle of Lipany for an upcoming exhibition. His proposal was accepted and, after making sketches at the battlefield, he began work in early 1898. He collaborated with Karel Raška (1861–1918), the landscape painter Václav Jansa, colorist Theodor Hilšer (1866–1930) and the animal painter Ludvík Vacátko. It measures 11 meters (36 feet) high and 95 meters (311 feet) long. The stress of completing this huge work on schedule had a fatal effect on his already fragile health and he died shortly after it went on display in 1898. A major retrospective of his work was held the following year. Three streets have been named after him; in Děčín, Kladno and Prague.

== Selected works ==
The Egg Market in Prague (1888)

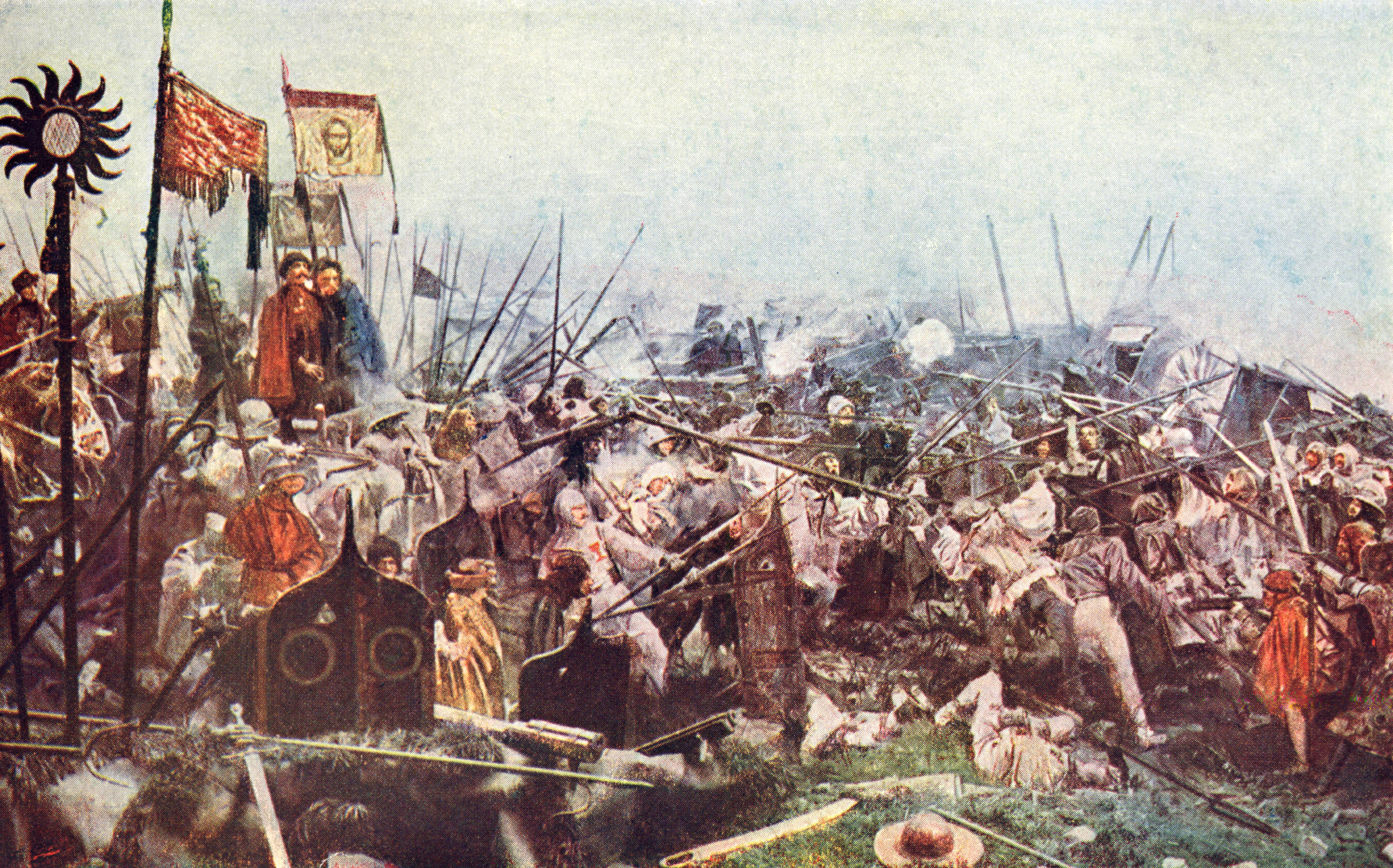
Group of Generals, from
The Battle of Lipany (1898)

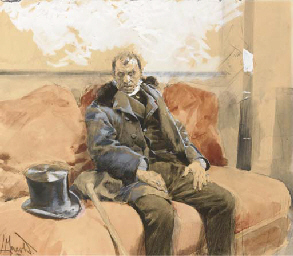
Man Sitting on a Divan

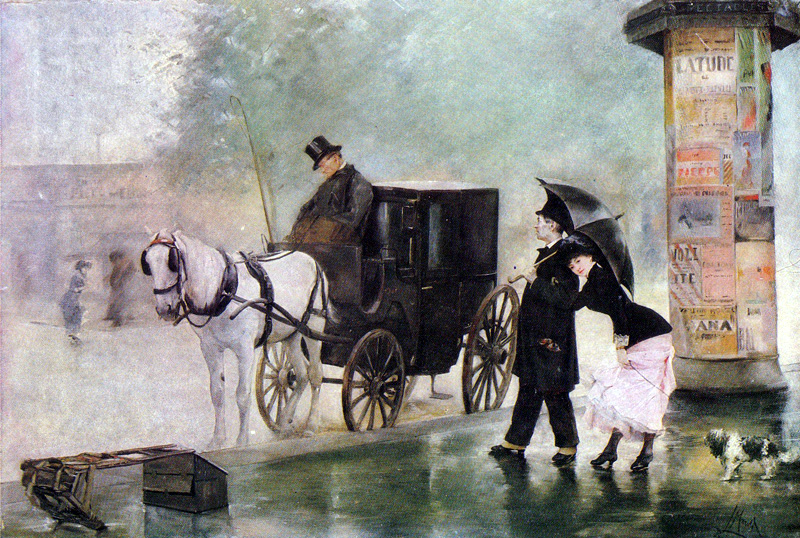
The Cabdriver (1891)
