= Sikory =

Sikory may refer to:

- Sikory, Kuyavian-Pomeranian Voivodeship (north-central Poland)
- Sikory, Łódź Voivodeship (central Poland)
- Sikory, Podlaskie Voivodeship (north-east Poland)
- Sikory, Legionowo County in Masovian Voivodeship (east-central Poland)
- Sikory, Płońsk County in Masovian Voivodeship (east-central Poland)
- Sikory, Sokołów County in Masovian Voivodeship (east-central Poland)
- Sikory, Drawsko County in West Pomeranian Voivodeship (north-west Poland)
- Sikory, Gryfice County in West Pomeranian Voivodeship (north-west Poland)
