= Sikorsky =

Sikorsky or Sikorski may refer to:

- Sikorsky (comics), a Marvel Comics character
- Sikorsky (Starjammers), a Marvel Comics character
- Sikorsky (crater), a lunar crater
- Sikorsky Aircraft, an American aircraft manufacturer

== People with the surname ==
- Brian Sikorski (born 1974), Major League Baseball and Nippon Professional Baseball relief pitcher
- Daniel Sikorski (born 1987), Austrian footballer
- Igor Sikorsky (1889–1972), Russian-American inventor and founder of the Sikorsky Aircraft Corporation
- Kazimierz Sikorski (1895–1986), Polish composer
- Krystian Sikorski (born 1961), Polish ice hockey player
- Radosław Sikorski (born 1963), Polish Minister of Foreign Affairs, former Minister of National Defence
- Roman Sikorski (1920–1983), Polish mathematician
- Władysław Sikorski (1881–1943), Polish general and Prime Minister in exile during World War II

=== Fictional ===
- Rudolf Sikorski, a character in Boris and Arkady Strugatsky's series of novels

== See also ==
- Sikorski
- Hans Sikorski, a music publishing house in Hamburg, Germany
- Polish Institute and Sikorski Museum, a museum in London
