= Jindřich Prucha =

Czech painter

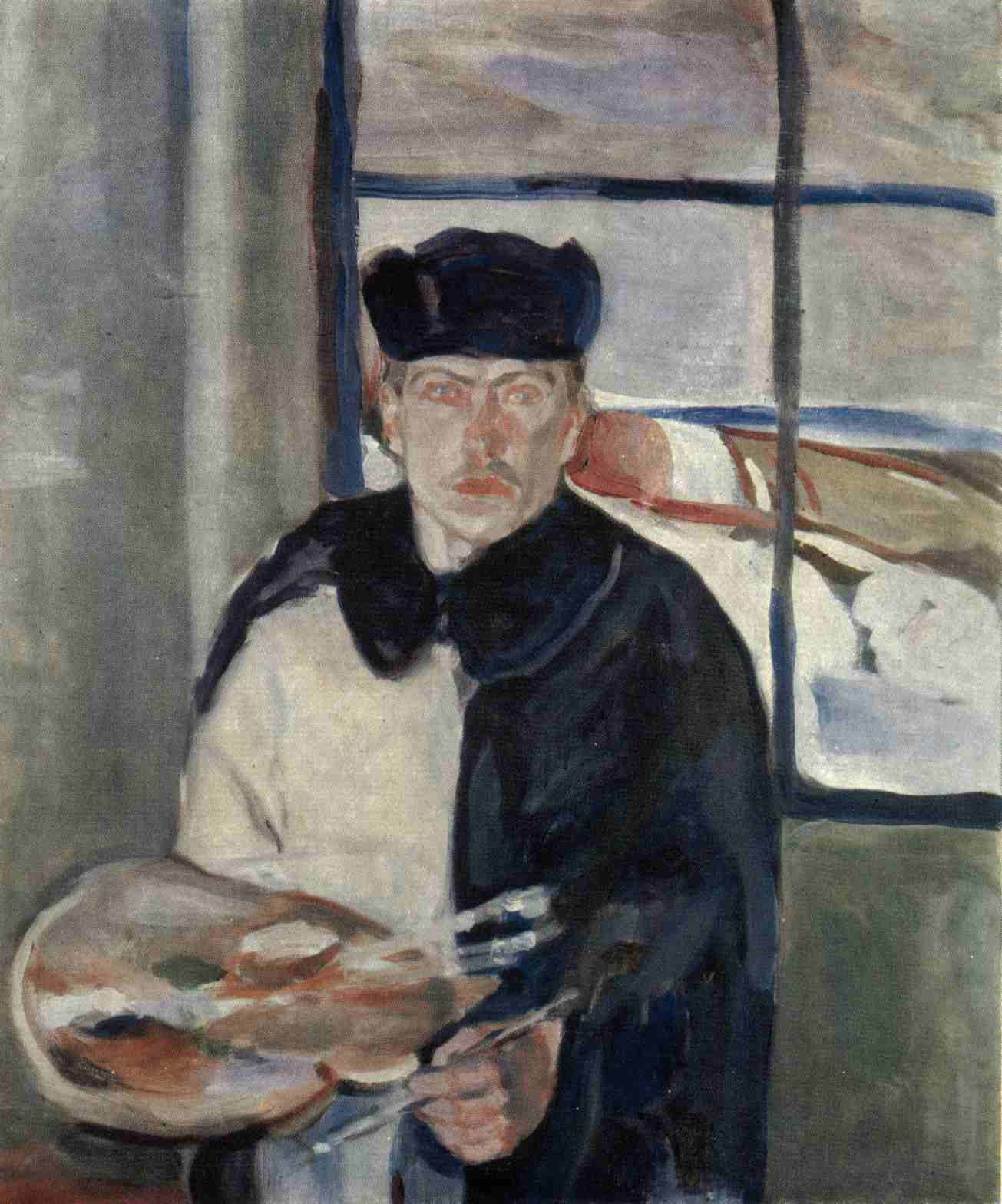
Self-portrait in Winter Garments (1911)

Jindřich Prucha (29 September 1886, Uherské Hradiště – 1 September 1914, in the Battle of Komarów) was a Czech landscape and portrait painter in the Fauvist and Expressionist styles. He was also an amateur violinist and sportsman.

== Biography ==
He was the last child born to a family of modest means, when his parents were already in their forties. His father was a member of the gendarmerie and the family moved frequently. From 1904 to 1905, he received his first art lessons from a teacher at the Gymnasium in Čáslav, who had noticed his talent.

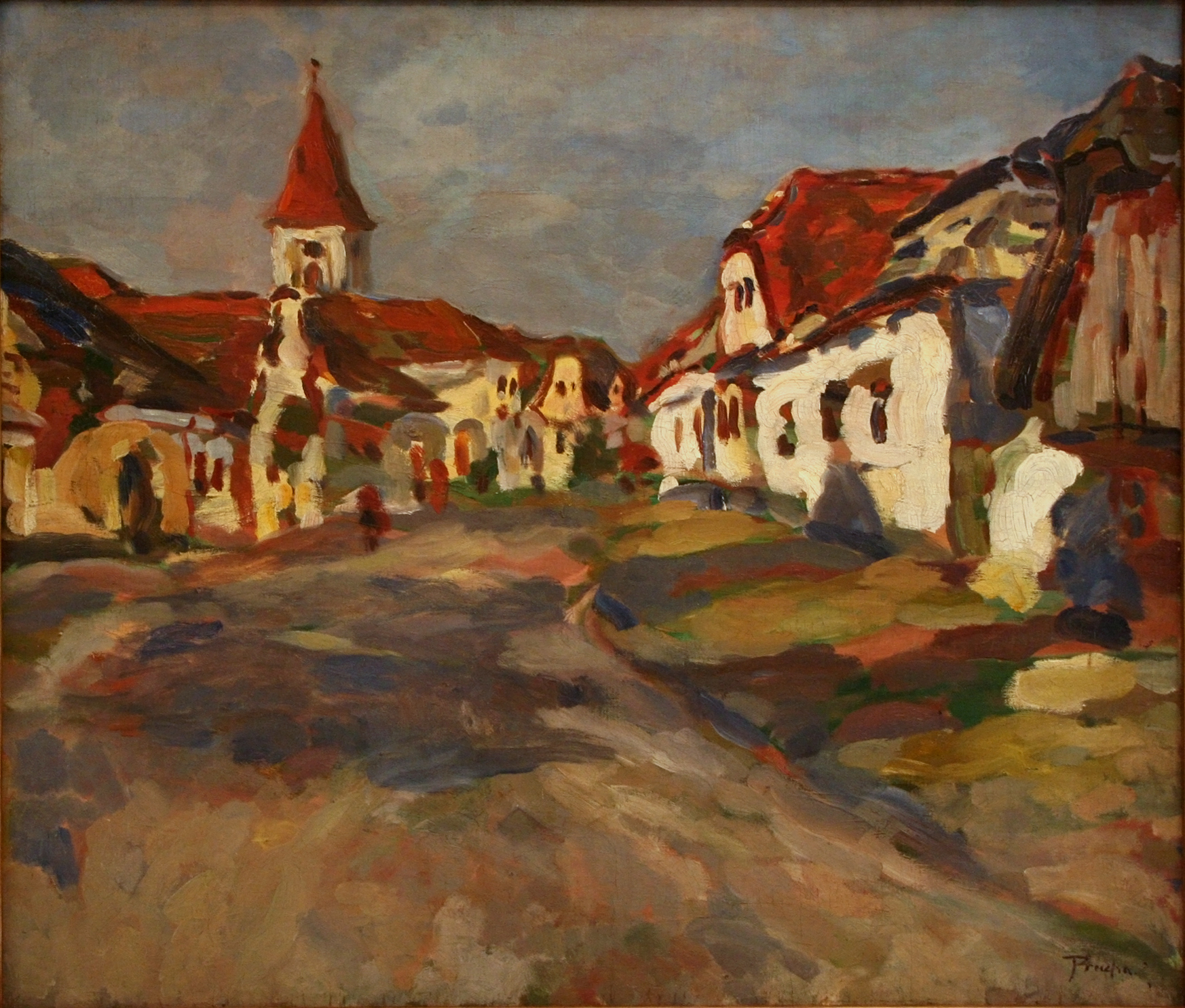
The Village Green in Ronov nad Doubravou (1911)

After graduating, to please his parents, he decided on a career in philology and enrolled at the Faculty of Arts, Charles University in Prague. His interest in art persisted, however, and he took private lessons from Ludvík Vacátko. In 1908, he presented three paintings to the Mánes Union of Fine Arts and was admitted as an associate member. That same year, his parents retired to a rural home near the village of Běstvina, due to his mother's declining health. Although he told his family that he would complete his philology degree, he neglected to do so and devoted himself to art. He then became a one-year volunteer, to avoid serving a full term of conscription, passed the officer's exam, and returned to his family in 1910 to spend all of his time painting.

=== Formal studies ===
He steadfastly refused to exhibit, but still became a full member of the Mánes Union in 1911. Deciding that it was time for some formal training, he enrolled at the Academy of Fine Arts, Munich and studied with Ludwig von Herterich. He left the Academy in 1912, complaining that his Professor was too enamored of the Old Masters. His father viewed this as a failure and, once again, urged him to do something else.

Instead, he applied for admission to the Academy of Fine Arts, Prague, but the requirements were too strict. He ended by attending the Technical University and taking drawing classes from Adolf Liebscher, which were designed to train high-school art teachers. This left him dissatisfied, as before, and he concluded that his style of painting was not compatible with earning money. He was worried about his parents and his eldest sister Vojslava, who was deaf, and he had received a letter from a close female friend saying that their relationship was over, so he became despondent and considered suicide. In late 1913, however, he simply went home to continue painting. After that, he finally began to exhibit locally, enjoying some success at a personal showing in Chotěboř.

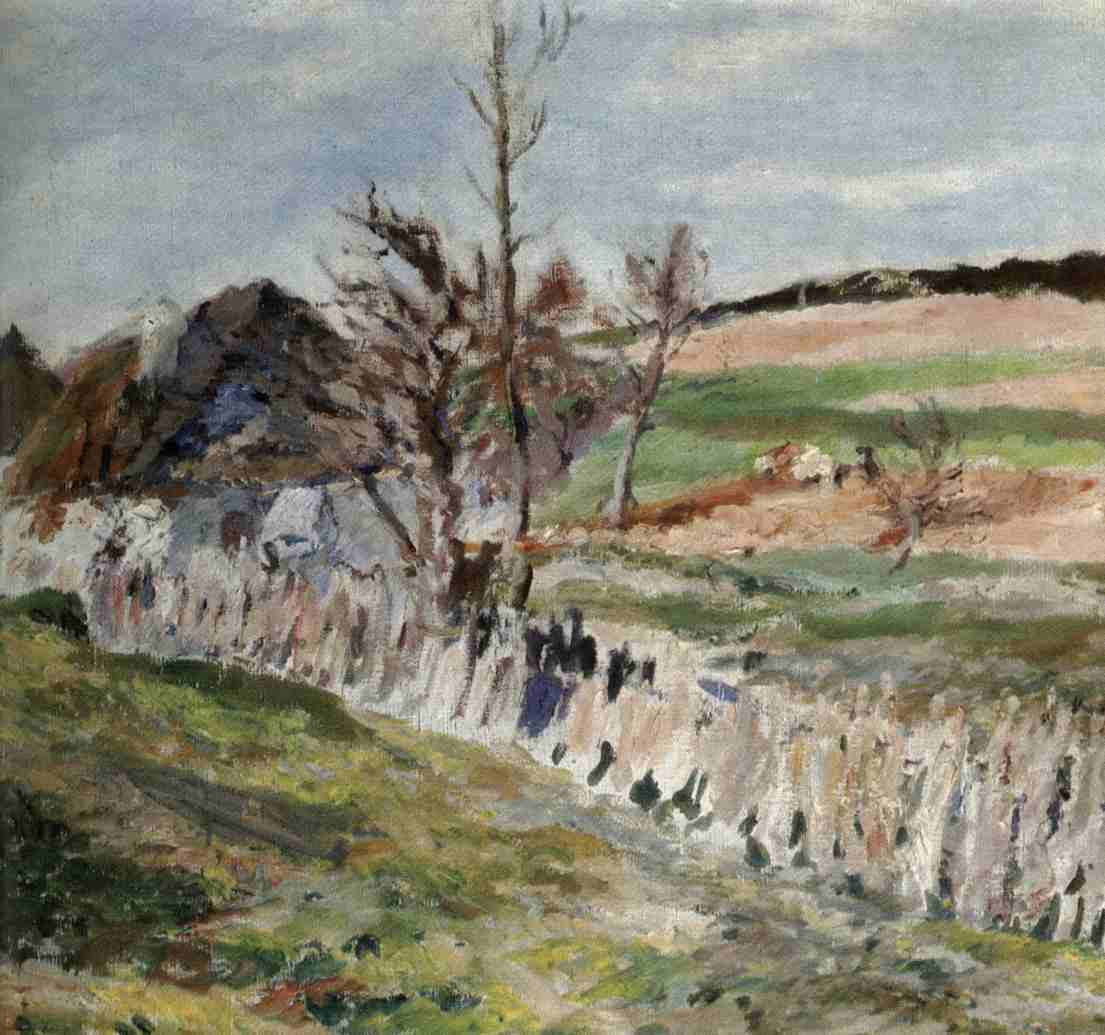
A Dry Day (1913)

In June 1914, his reserve unit was mobilized. After a few weeks in Močovice, he was sent to Galicia. He was killed in battle shortly after, but he was buried in a mass grave and his family was not notified for several months.

Despite having such a short life, he managed to produce at least 200 oil paintings and over 600 pastels. In 1944, the Nobel Prize winning Czech poet, Jaroslav Seifert wrote a long poem called Pruchovo jaro (Prucha's Spring).
