= Zdeněk Sýkora =

Czech artist (1920–2011)

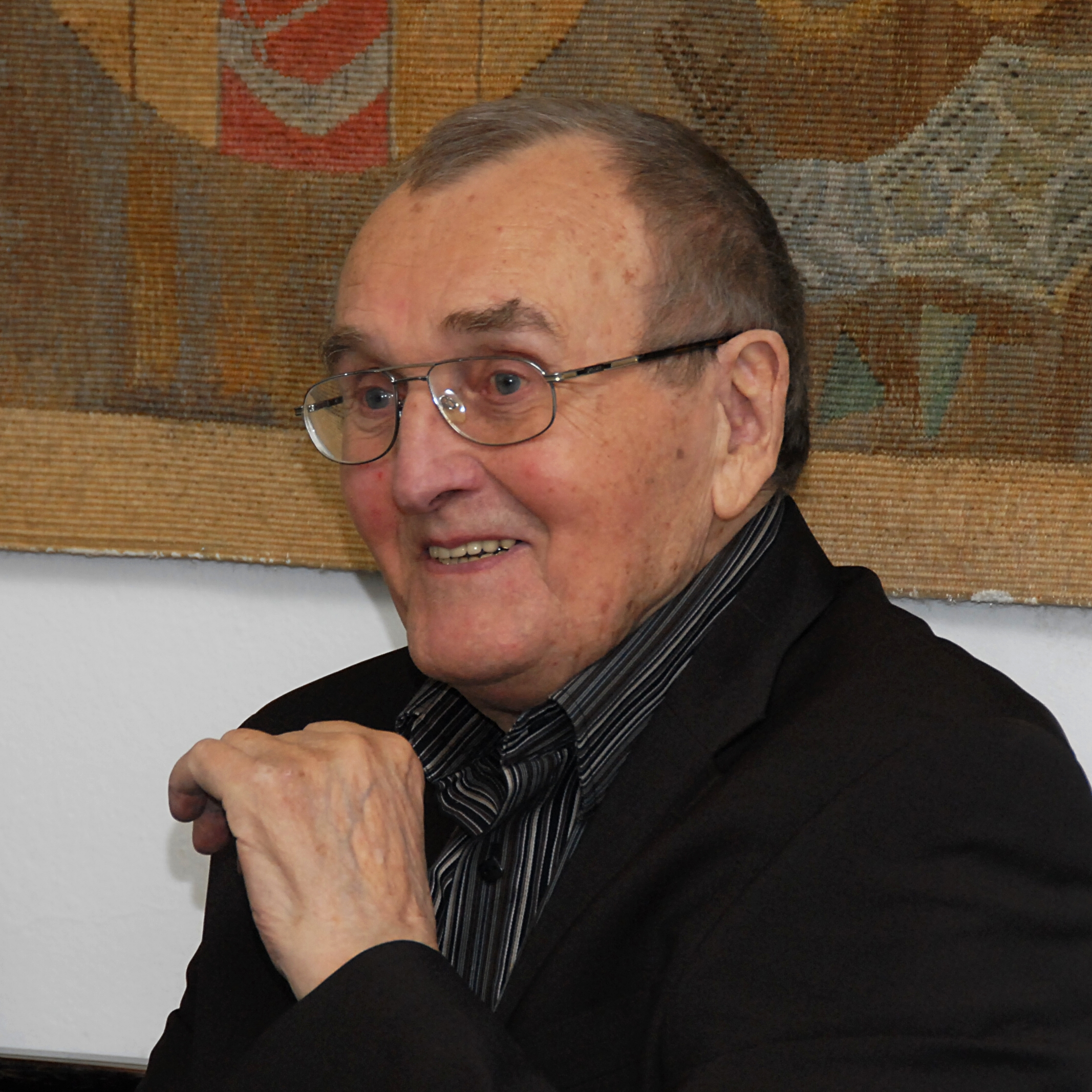
Sýkora in 2010

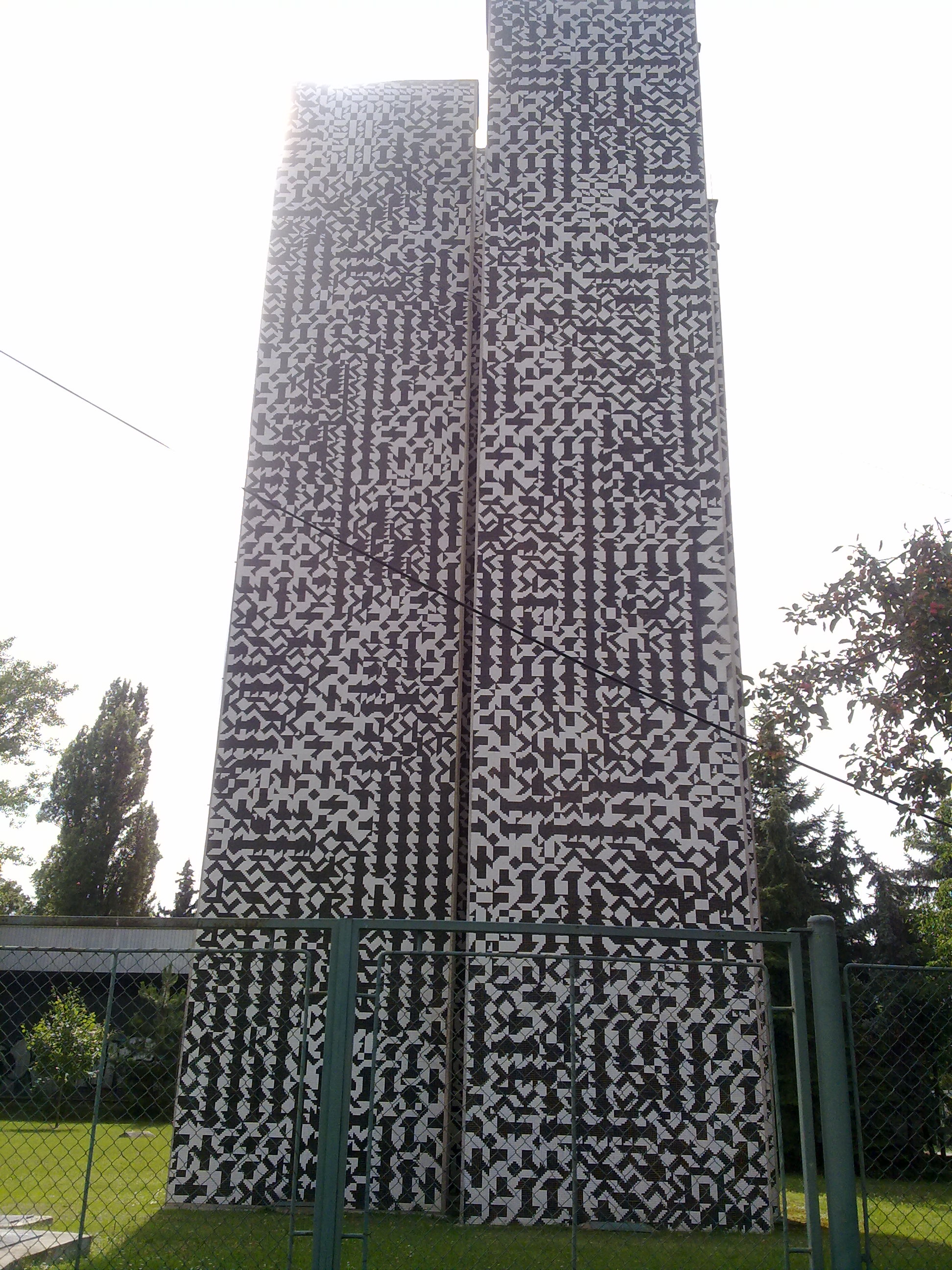
Ventilation tower of Letná tunnel in Prague, decorated by Zdeněk Sýkora

Zdeněk Sýkora (3 February 1920 – 12 July 2011) was a Czech modern abstract painter and sculptor, and a pioneer of using computers in art.

== Early life ==
Sýkora was born in Louny, Czechoslovakia. His style and medium changed from landscape paintings in the late 1940s to geometrical abstract structures in the 50s. Influenced by cubism and surrealism in the 1960s, he became one of the first artists to use computers in creating geometric abstract paintings. During the Soviet occupations of many countries after World War II, including Czechoslovakia, Sýkora was unable to hold many exhibitions, and some of the only pieces that can be seen from the late 1960s are government building projects. During this period, the artist spent a great deal of time working in Prague.

== Late life ==
Sýkora's style eventually turned to a less strict system of line paintings with lines of color moving across large canvasses in random directions.

Also in the 1960s, Sýkora was member of the art group Křižovatka (lit. 'crossroad'). While in this group, he created his first structures and realizations for architecture in the Prague neighborhood of Letná on Jindřišská Street). In 1985, he began collaborating on paintings with his wife, Lenka Sýkora. Their most recent realization for architecture can be found in the building of flight operation in Jeneč near Prague. Sýkora had his second retrospective exhibition in 1995, 25 years after his first one, which had been held in Špála Gallery in 1970, and was not authorized by the occupying Russians. In 1995, it was the Prague City Gallery that held the exhibition in the Municipal Library and was a cross-section of his work. Sýkora remained mostly active up until his death at age 91. He died in Louny on 12 July 2011.

== Legacy ==
Sýkora's paintings are owned by galleries around the globe, including the Centre Georges Pompidou and the MUMOK in Vienna.

== Awards ==
- Vladimír Boudnik Award – 2008 – Czech Republic
- Ordre des Arts et des Lettres – France
- Herbert-Boeckl-Preis – Austria

== Exhibitions ==
Sýkora had hundreds of exhibitions internationally over his lifetime. A partial list is found on Prague Art & Design.
