= Krzysztof Ryszard Sikora =

Polish politician

Krzysztof Sikora

member of Sejm 2005-2007
- In office 25 September 2005 – 2007

Personal details
- Born: 16 May 1959 (age 66)
- Party: Samoobrona

Krzysztof Ryszard Sikora (born 16 May 1959 in Chełm) is a Polish politician. He was elected to Sejm on 25 September 2005, getting 5695 votes in 20 Warsaw district as a candidate from the Samoobrona Rzeczpospolitej Polskiej list.

== See also ==
- Members of Polish Sejm 2005-2007
