= Krzysztof Gustaw Sikora =

Polish politician

Krzysztof Sikora

Chairperson of the Kuyavian-Pomeranian Regional Assembly
- In office 24 November 2006 – 2010
- Preceded by: Lucyna Andrysiak

Member of Kuyavian-Pomeranian Regional Assembly from 4 district
- In office 2006–2010
- Preceded by: Lucyna Andrysiak
- Succeeded by: Dorota Jakuta

Chancellor of University of Economy in Bydgoszcz
- Incumbent
- Assumed office 1999

Personal details
- Born: 4 February 1954 (age 72) Koronowo, Poland
- Party: Civic Platform

Krzysztof Gustaw Sikora (born 4 February 1954 in Koronowo, Poland) is a Polish politician who was a current Member of Kuyavian-Pomeranian Regional Assembly and Assembly Chairperson from 2006 to 2010.

He is Chancellor of University of Economy in Bydgoszcz (Wyższa Szkoła Gospodarki).

In 2004 European Parliament election he was a candidate of Civic Platform from Kuyavian-Pomeranian constituency. He polled 4,515 votes and was not elected.

In 2006 local election he joined the Regional Assembly III term representing the 1st district. He scored 12,928 votes, running on the Civic Platform list. Assembly III Term elected him as Assembly Chairperson (Przewodniczący Sejmiku Województwa Kujawsko-Pomorskiego).

== See also ==
- Kuyavian-Pomeranian Regional Assembly
