= Elise Kibler =

American actress

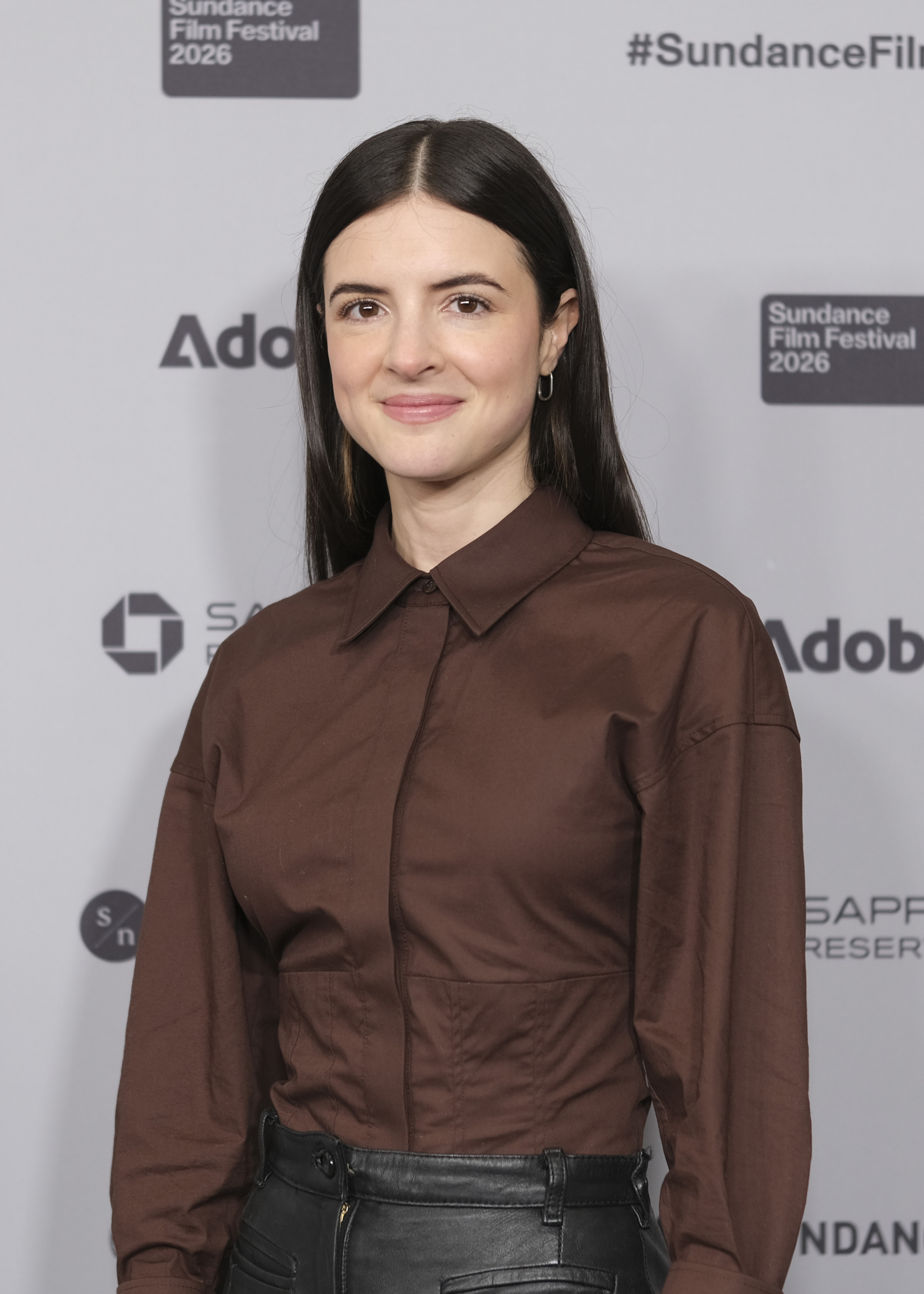
- Occupation: Actress
- Years active: 2009–present

Elise Kibler is an American actress. She is best known for playing Nadia Romanova in the comedy series American Classic and Anna in the drama film Union County.

== Early life ==
Kibler grew up in Oak Park, Illinois. She knew she wanted to be an actress from a very young age when she played an elephant with a slinky nose in Open Door Repertory’s musical version of Rudyard Kipling’s Just So Stories. She attended Gwendolyn Brooks Middle School and Oak Park and River Forest High School where she performed in various theatre projects. She moved to New York City where she graduated from the New York University Tisch School of the Arts.

== Career ==
Kibler made her Broadway debut in the The Heidi Chronicles. She played the lead role in the play Indian Summers alongside Owen Campbell In her Broadway performance in The Heidi Chronicles Kibler had the rare distinction of playing three different character in the same show. She played Becky, Clara and Denise. She had a recurring role playing Sloane Killory in the action thriller series The Night Agent She played Anna in the drama film Union County starring Will Poulter. Her biggest role so far has been playing Nadia Romanova in the comedy series American Classic.

She recently played FBI agent Alice Black’s sister in the Hulu series Furious.

== Filmography ==
=== Film ===
Year	Title	Role	Notes
2009	This Keeps Happening	Charlotte	Short
2013	Bowl Me	Girl	Short
2014	Joke Writer	Heather Perks	Short
2016	Crop	Evelyn	Short
2018	Hamlet In The Golden Vale	Ophelia	
2019	The Sunlit Night	Gaby	
2019	Love	The Model	Short
2023	Alive & Well	Grace	Short
2025	Dead Serious	Liv	Short
2025	How to Lose a Dog	Dana	Short
2026	Union County	Anna	
2026	Sinner Supper Club	Woman	
2026	Human Theories	Amy	
2026	Do It to Me If You Want	Alexandra	Short

=== Television ===
Year	Title	Role	Notes
2014	The Affair	Salesgirl	Episode; #1.4
2015	Daredevil	Tracy Farnum	Episode; Into the Ring
2016	Younger	Sierra	Episode; Bad Romance
2025	The Night Agent	Sloane Killory	4 episodes
2025	The Equalizer	Ariel Kincaid	Episode; Trust No One
2026	American Classic	Nadia Romanova	7 episodes
