= Kev Gray & The Gravy Train =

Japanese band

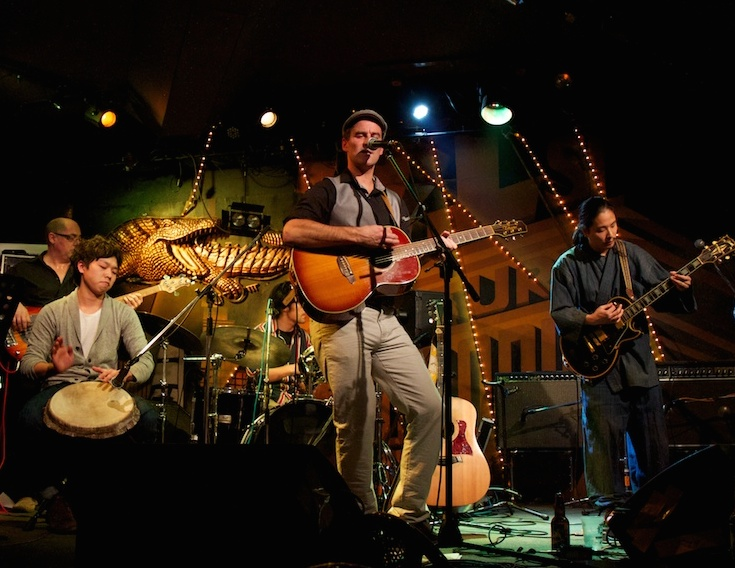
- Live @ The Crocodile Club, Tokyo

Background information
- Origin: Japan
- Genres: Indie, Lounge, Blues, Funk
- Years active: 2008–present
- Label: Hemlock Music
- Members: Kev Gray; Mami Horano; Forrest "Mississippi" Nelson; Rob Moreau; Shokei Konno; Pon
- Past members: Damien Cavanagh; Rob Gommerman; Chris Colling; Christy Strothers

Kev Gray & The Gravy Train are an alternative pop rock band formed in Tokyo in November 2008, with members from America, Canada, England and Japan. After being chosen as a feature band in the government-sponsored, UK-Japan Year 2008, the group achieved mixed success on the Japanese music scene, after signing to Hemlock Music and twice winning the national music award, Gaijin Sounds.

Based around the songwriting of lead singer, Kev Gray, their sound has drawn comparisons to melody driven artists such as Paul McCartney, The Smiths and Antony Hegarty. After starting as an acoustic trio, the band later went electric and became known for its array of vocal and musical styles, before the band rebuilt its original sound in 2013 with new personnel in Tokyo: "Pon" (guitar); Shokei Konno on percussion, Mari Uga on sax, and Rob Moreau (mandolin). They developed a national following after touring in Japan, including Hard Rock Cafe, The Crocodile Club, and headlined events at the international music festival, Japan Music Week. The group have also played in England, Australia, Canada and America, and much of SE Asia.

The group featured frequently in the Japanese media, including TV, radio and press, receiving strong reviews in Metropolis, Japanzine, and Time Out, whose editor, Jon Wilks, described the songs as demonstrating "lyrical genius". Their first release, Shipwrecked, in November 2008, was closely followed in May 2009 by I Should've Stopped There, with their troubled album, Antidote, finally released in October 2011.

After an accident involving the lead singer, The Gravy Train cancelled most live shows and recordings in 2012 but made a comeback in early 2013 in Tokyo, aiming to restart recording for the two albums, The Veil Has Been Lifted, and Prisoner in Paradise. The band headlined events at Hard Rock Cafe's anniversary celebrations in Tokyo and an all-day music festival in July, Tokyo Woodstock, before a summer tour of the US in 2013. A round-the-world tour of Japan, England, Canada and the US in the summer of 2015 was cut short after a car-crash in California, and the outfit is looking to record a new album in autumn 2016.

== History ==
=== Formation and early success (2006–2010) ===
The band started as a recording trio in 2006 as Akibakei, featuring Japanese TV star, Christy Strothers, female singer from the show, The Human Jukebox; and veteran New York saxophonist, Arnie Baruch, alongside Gray on vocals and guitar. After returning to Tokyo in January 2008, a live duo was formed between Gray and classical guitarist, Robin Watson. Watson was at the time a member of the British-Japanese outfit, Eden Rogue, with the Tokyo label, Suzuki Records. They were joined by Damien Cavanagh, former drummer with the British prog-indie group, Circulus, played the cajón in the trio due to the acoustic nature of the band.

The band won the Gaijin Sounds songwriting award in April 2008 for the song, "How The Story Ends". This attracted the attention of Australian music producer, Paul Morgan, who then invited them to record at his Medici Studios and set up Hemlock Music to promote the band. The resulting recording, Shipwrecked, was produced by ARIA-nominated, Mike Stangel, at the studio in Melbourne in August 2008. The band released their debut EP, Shipwrecked, on November 7, 2008, in Ebisu, Tokyo. To increase the band's songwriting profile, the group released a collection of early recordings, I Should've Stopped There. The cover, designed by Rob Moore, featured "The Angel of Sorrow", from a mural in Valencia, Spain. Although the lyrical and vocal strength of the collection had initially been enough to kickstart the band's initial success, with songs such as the 1950s swing number, "Guatemala", and the harmony rich gospel song, "Jordan River", the album received mixed reaction due to the poor quality production and some mediocre album tracks.

In April 2009, the band won another Gaijin Sounds award, this time for "One More Chance". The increased exposure saw the band secure a monthly residency at The Crocodile Club, a former rockabilly hangout in Harajuku with their regular UK-Japan Night. During this period, Hemlock Music arranged international support acts such as Afro-American kalimba artist, Kevin Spears; world music from Arabiki-Beat, and the Austin-based country singer, Jackie Bristow. The band also used the club to record live recordings and debut new songs, including The Veil Has Been Lifted, Who Loves The Lonely, and their most popular song, Six Feet Under.

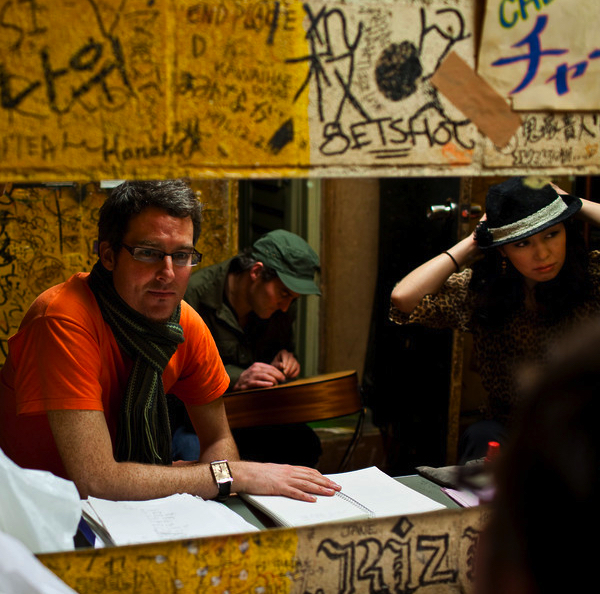
The Gravy Train – Backstage in the Green Room at the Crocodile Club, Shibuya

The proposed ethos of Hemlock music was that Tokyo bands would be able fund recordings through live receipts. The first planned album was to be Antidote, which according to Gray, was to be a showcase of the band's diversity. Songs were written in a mix of genres such as country-inspired, Letters from Tijuana; the blues number, Swingin'; the Cuban-influenced, Voodoo Doll; and the 6/8 open chord waltz, Long Time Coming. The diversity of the song content was to be matched by the lyrical themes which drew upon allegedly true stories, from suicidal friends to a swingers party in a Japanese hot spring. However, production problems and personal differences plagued the recordings delaying its completion. The proposed launch went ahead on November 11, 2009, but without the CD, which despite attempts at remixing would finally be mostly re-recorded. Despite the ongoing problems with the recordings, the band continued to have increasing success on the live scene around Japan. After playing at Hard Rock Cafe in Nagoya in early 2009, they were invited to open the Hakuba Music Festival, also known as KevRock after its Australian organizer, Kevin Gibson, appearing with Australian bands, the Hoodoo Gurus and Regurgitator. This was followed up with appearance at Japan Music Week, the Tokyo attempt at SXSW in November of that year.

=== Antidote and continued success (2010–2011) ===
After suffering from ill health, Watson left the band in January 2010, with Canadian, Chris Cooling, taking over on electric guitar, and Mississippian, Forrest Nelson on bass, giving the band a more dynamic sound. Gray returned to London in July 2010 to promote his new solo album, The Veil Has Been Lifted, appearing at the Wimbledon Calling festival, headlined by British Sea Power and The Automatic; and then the acoustic stage at the Aeon Festival. However, again quality issues with the recordings meant the album was postponed and Gray returned to Tokyo to headline at Japan Music Week again in November. With the departure of drummer, Damien Cavanagh, to England, Nelson recruited close friend, Rob Gommerman, who had been the previous drummer of gold-selling Canadian rock band, Finger Eleven. The band re-recorded the Antidote album at the Japanese indie haven, Stepway Studios, in Yoyogi, Tokyo in spring 2011. A total of 12 new tracks were recorded and Antidote was released in October 2011.

The Gravy Train garnered some limited success in the US after their folk song, "Happy Children", was used in the short film, The Pin, featuring Hollywood actors, John Magaro and Emily Meade. After shooting a video New York-based Positively Fourth Street Productions in the US in July 2011, the band released an accompanying single, "Hang On To The Sweet Song", with Record Union in December 2011. Both creations were the brainchild of Hal Sofsky and Abhay Sofsky, the latter being the co-producer of SXSW Best Documentary 2012, "Beware of Mr. Baker".

The video for "Hang Onto The Sweet Song In Your Soul" was shot in a vintage furniture store in Williamsburg, New York, called Brooklyn Reclamation. The producers went for the innovative approach of making a compound live video where over 50 live takes were taken around the store over the course of about 10 hours. The best matches were chosen and edited to form one "live song". Co-director, Hal Sofksy said: "After seeing him perform live, we felt lip-syncing would underplay his vocal appeal. We chose the store to reflect the timeless nature of the vintage music that his songwriting evokes – it does sound from another era until you hear the lyrics. And although the song itself deals with the struggle of modern existence, its message is again pretty timeless: whatever happens, you'll always have music to help you through".

Before the video was shot, Gray embarked on a minor tour of the US East Coast, playing in NYC at Greenwich Village venues such as The Bitter End and Caffe Vivaldi, as well as Boston, where he featured in the music festival, Fête de la Musique, and played at The Lizard Lounge in Cambridge. After the US venture, The Gravy Train restarted in Tokyo playing at Japan Music Week 2011 at various events from November 4–13, including Rock Cafe, La Mama, Crawfish, and a jam venue, Timeout, with bands from Canada, Singapore, Japan and Brazil, including the bossa-nova artist, Sabrina Helsh.

=== Accident and comeback (2012–2016) ===
After a near-fatal accident, Gray had to stop singing for most of 2012, cancelling all recordings and most of their live shows. The band resurfaced in Tokyo in February 2013 playing a series of comeback shows in Azabu, Akasaka, and Roppongi, including Bauhaus and Hard Rock Cafe. Due to the break, the existing members of the band moved onto new projects, leading Gray to recruit new personnel in Tokyo. such as a Japanese guitarist from the band of 1970s folk-singer Masato Minami, Pon, as well as a new multi-instrumentalist drummer, Shokei Konno, who met playing in Kichijōji's Inokashira Park,. This added a more Japanese influence to the band, with occasional impromptu vocal performances of traditional Japanese folks songs such as "Seikatsu no gara".

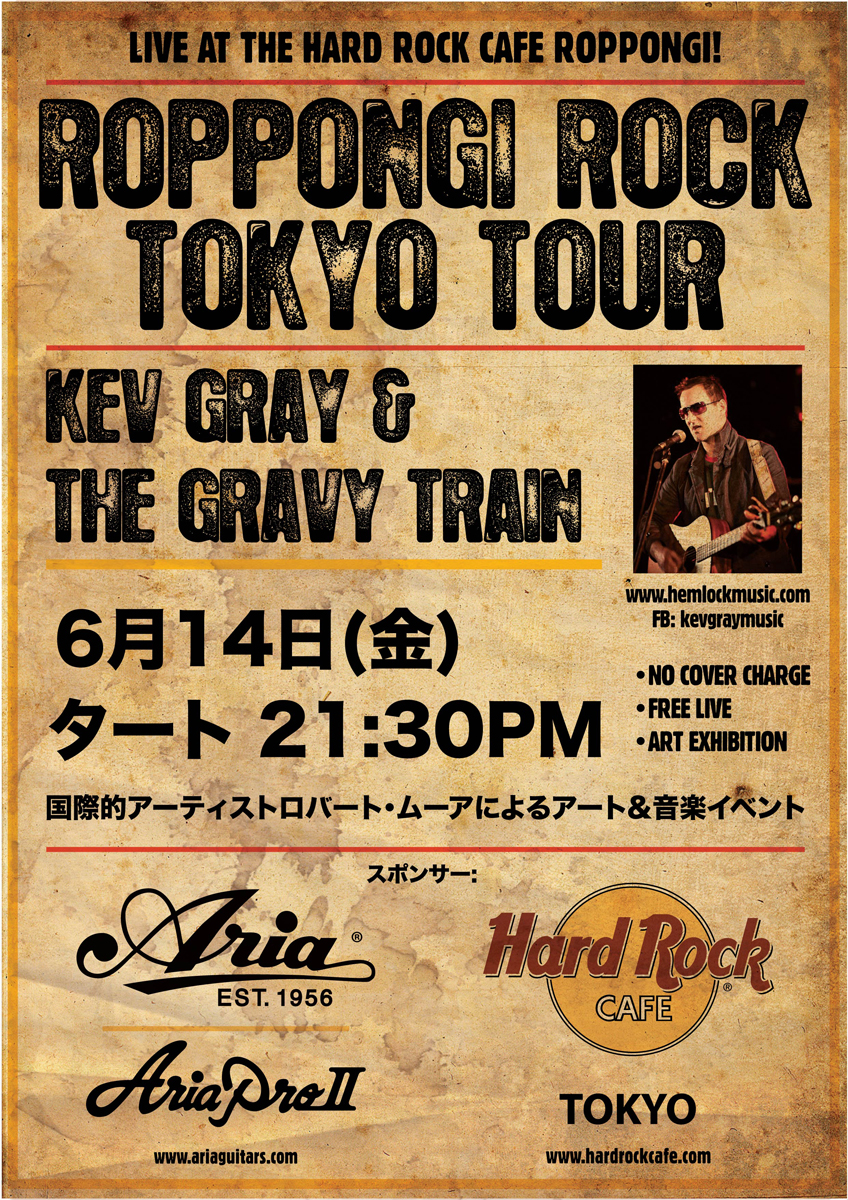
Poster for Hard Rock Cafe Tokyo's 25th Anniversary Party featuring Kev Gray & The Gravy Train – June 2013

In June 2013, The Gravy Train headlined at Hard Rock Cafe, Tokyo as part of the Hard Rock Cafe's Anniversary celebrations celebrations. The event featured an art exhibition by Nagoya-based painter and designer, Rob Moore, and an additional live set from the Japanese rock outfit, Sawas Phool. This was followed by a performance at the Neptune Theatre for Tokyo Arts Week, which featured Edinburgh Festival comedian Spring Day and a run of Lanford Wilson's Burn This starring New York actors Katherine Puma and Rob Skolits.

The band next featured at an all-day arts and music festival in July called Tokyo Woodstock. The event showcased artists from around Japan demonstrating artwork, poetry, music, spoken word, film and photography.

- The festival featured film by "the foremost Western scholar of the Japanese cinema", the late Donald Richie, who was described by author Tom Wolfe as "the Lafcadio Hearn of our time; a subtle, stylish, and deceptively lucid medium between two cultures that confuse one another: the Japanese and the American." The short film, was one of the "Five Philosophical Fables" from 1967, said to have "had a seminal influence in Japan"
- The festival also featured short films by the pinhole photographer, film maker and author, Edward Levinson; and videographer, Kyle Drubeck, debuting a preview of his documentary about the devastating impact of the Fukushima disaster on the communities of Tohoku in 2011. Drubeck travelled to radioactive areas on his motorbike and filmed footage in a radiation suit to record a first-hand account of the disaster.
- Poetry was represented by Gary Quinn, the Irish poet, author and film-maker; Joe Zhangi, publisher of Printed Matter Press, and Yuri Kugeyama, the American-Japanese poet, author and journalist, who was described by the Mainichi News, as writing "poems that convey an intelligent, sensitive and sexual woman who enjoys life to the full, and who can express herself in a language filled to excess with energy".

Between the film and poetry were various musical performances, with main events of the evening were the performances of the German-Japanese funk band, TEFCO, and the headline act, Kev Gray & The Gravy Train.

On the back of the summer success in Tokyo, Gray headed on a tour of the States, playing in New York, Washington, D.C., West Virginia, Miami, and Key West. The main event was a show at the New York singer-songwriter institution Caffe Vivaldi in Greenwich Village. Opened in the 1980s, it became a regular hangout for New York artists, such as Woody Allen, and Al Pacino. Owner Ishrat Ansari had befriended Gray on his previous trips to the Caffe and gave him a Friday night slot, often occupied by major artists such as Marcus Mumford from Mumford and Sons. The show featured Jack Spann, from the Broadway musical, War Horse, on the Grand piano, and Mikiya Ito from Japan on cajon and percussion.

In the winter of 2015, the band featured on the TOKYO EYE program for the national Japanese TV broadcaster, NHK. In the program, the band explored the music scene at various livehouses in Tokyo, culminating in an impromptu jam session at Meguro Timeout, a live music speak-easy ran by master, Mura-san, where musicians were able to drop in at any time and play with other musicians using the numerous instruments on display. Gray stated that Timeout was one of his favourites places to play music anywhere due to its informal nature and inclusivity of styles and ages, saying he had often been in the middle of the night to finish writing a song or practice when needed. Gray featured on the radio in Japan due to interest from DJ Guy Perryman from Tokyo InterFM. Firstly, on a live performance broadcast and interview of Gray's Desert Island Discs at the Brewdog Live Sessions in Roppongi, Tokyo.

This was followed by another live performance on air, featuring four songs: One More Chance; The Arrival of the Prince: and the yoga-inspired Dirty Downward Dog. Gray mentioned he had planned to record a video with the song in New York in September 2015 but the video was cancelled due to the production company getting a contract to work with Leonardo DiCaprio. In the interview, Gray mentioned his recent jam session with Japanese popstar, Tsuyoshi Kusanagi, from Japan's most famous celebrity group, SMAP, describing him as very modest and "a gentle soul". The band started round-the-world tour of Japan, England, Canada and the US in the summer of 2015 with dates in Tokyo, Los Angeles, San Francisco, Vancouver, Chicago, New York, London and Gray's hometown of Newcastle. However, the tour was cut short after a car-crash on a highway in California in September, which left Gray with concussion and whiplash.

=== 2017–present ===
In summer of 2017, the band embarked on a World Tour of Asia, Europe and North America. The tour was launched at the 333 Club at the top of Tokyo Tower, followed by dates in Bangkok, Helsinki and London. A 5-week coast-to-coast tour across America followed. Gray was the featured artist at the Singer-Songwriter Sessions at the Greenwich Village rock club, The Bitter End, and again at the Pittsburgh Songwriters Circle, before heading to Nashville, appearing at the Bourbon Street Blues Bar in Printer's Alley, and shooting a video at Sun Studios, Memphis. Other performances in New Orleans, San Antonio, Phoenix and Los Angeles completed a tour of 26 performances in 10 weeks.

The band celebrated its 10th anniversary with a series of shows in Tokyo in 2018, including the Tokyo Dex Sessions event, This and That Cafe, at the Roppongi arts venue, Superdeluxe. In summer 2019, the band embarked on a tour of Japan and North America, the Pacifica Tour, performing in Los Angeles, Seattle, Vancouver and Phoenix.

=== Future plans ===
The band still aim to make a video for the yoga-themed bossa nova song, "Dirty Downward Dog". The albums The Veil Has Been Lifted, and Prisoner in Paradise, are yet to be finished. Gray states that he is currently looking for a suitable producer to finish the albums.

== Other projects ==
=== Funk/soul ===
The band has worked with many other artists expanding into new genres such as funk and deep-house. Gray started writing and performing for German Japanese funk outfit, TEFCO ( Tokyo Electric Funk Company) from 2012, featuring at venues such as Daikanyama Loop, Aoyama Mandala and the Crocodile Club in Harajuku. An album featuring songs such as Busty, Swing Down, Cool Dude, was released in 2016.

=== Deep House ===
In mid 2019, Gray started working with Russian DJ, Pasha Vakabular, to co-write Deep House tracks for the music scene on Ko Phangan, Thailand - releasing tracks such as "Telling Me Lies" and "Bright Future" on the Hollystone Records label.

== Activism and campaigning ==
The band has been an active supporter of several charities in its career, raising money at shows and donating performance fees for causes all over the world, such as Empowerment Society International in Liberia; the Chiki Kids Charity in Laos; ARK Animal Rescue Kansai; and disaster relief such the Tohoku earthquake and Haiti earthquake (Lovin' Haiti).

Recently, the band played at the Black Card Cabaret Hollywood Ball in Tokyo, featuring Tokyo celebrities, such as DJ Guy Perryman and Japanese TV star, Dewi Fujin. The event raised over 1.4 million yen for Refugees International Japan.

Gray was commissioned to write a song for the Shark Conservation group, Projects Abroad, which campaigns against the malpractice of "finning" where 95% of the shark is discarded after the fins are cut off for the lucrative soup market. After a month of research, Gray came up with the theme and lyrics, then the music. The song, "The Last Shark", is sung from the perspective of "the last shark" and hopes "to warn, educate, and change attitudes to the demonization of sharks". The song is to be used for a video to campaign to reduce "finning". The project claims sharks will be virtually extinct within 20 years and marine ecosystems will collapse. Written as melancholy lament at the demise of the last shark in jazz standard style on guitar and piano, Gray sang and played a solo guitar version live on air during a radio interview at Tokyo INTER FM in February 2016, cautioning listeners of the dangers of eating "fukahire" shark fin soup.

== Musical influences ==
As the sole songwriter of the band, Gray describes the songs as "vintage originals", given the influence of all of the older vintage genres on the music: jazz, blues, swing, Latin, folk, country, and rock'n' roll. He ascribes the mainly acoustic nature of the music as being due to living in small musician-unfriendly accommodation in Japan, where electric guitars are not welcome, while maintaining that "electric guitars should not be played with headphones". The eclectic nature of the music was shown in diverse lyrical and thematic choices of Gray during a Desert Island Discs radio show with InterFM DJ, Guy Perryman, in Roppongi in 2015.
