= Laya DeLeon Hayes =

American actress

- Hayes in 2024
- Born: June 22, 2004 (age 22); Charlotte, North Carolina, U.S.
- Occupation: Actress
- Years active: 2013–present

Laya DeLeon Hayes (born June 22, 2004) is an American actress. She is best known for her role as Delilah Fulton in the CBS crime drama series The Equalizer and for voicing the titular character in the animated series Doc McStuffins. In 2023, she won a BAFTA Games Award for her role as Angrboda in God of War Ragnarök.

== Early life ==
Hayes was born on June 22, 2004 in Charlotte, North Carolina, and raised in Grand Prairie, Texas. She participated in school plays and talent shows from a young age before pursuing professional acting.

== Career ==
Hayes began her professional acting career in 2013, appearing in guest roles on television series such as Grey's Anatomy and Chicago Fire.

From 2015 to 2020, she voiced the lead character in the Disney Junior animated series Doc McStuffins, replacing Kiara Muhammad. Her performance earned her a nomination for an NAACP Image Award.

In 2021, Hayes joined the main cast of the CBS reboot series The Equalizer, portraying Delilah Fulton, the daughter of the titular character played by Queen Latifah.

In 2022, she voiced Angrboda in the action-adventure video game God of War Ragnarök. Her performance was highly praised, earning her the award for Performer in a Supporting Role at the 19th British Academy Games Awards in 2023.

In 2023, she starred as Vicaria in the lead role of the sci-fi horror film The Angry Black Girl and Her Monster.

== Filmography ==
=== Film ===
| Year | Title | Role | Notes |
|---|---|---|---|
| 2023 | The Angry Black Girl and Her Monster | Vicaria | Lead role |
| 2027 | Snoop † | Shante Taylor | |

=== Television ===
| Year | Title | Role | Notes |
|---|---|---|---|
| 2015–2020 | Doc McStuffins | Doc McStuffins | Voice role (Lead) |
| 2018 | Raven's Home | Zeena Kamakamee'leon | Recurring role |
| 2021–2025 | The Equalizer | Delilah Fulton | Main role |

=== Video games ===
| Year | Title | Role | Notes |
|---|---|---|---|
| 2022 | God of War Ragnarök | Angrboda | Voice and motion capture |
