= List of Johnny Alegre collaborations =

Here is the list of all the collaborations of Filipino musical artist Johnny Alegre with other artists in other albums.

This list will expand over time.

== As producer ==
=== Albums ===
| Artist | Album title | Imprint | Catalog | Role | Year | Format |
|---|---|---|---|---|---|---|
| Various Artists | 8th Metro Manila Popular Music Festival | Vicor Music / Sunshine Records | TSP-5400 | Production Supervision: Johnny Alegre | 1985 | Compilation LP and cassette |
| Various Artists | The Best of Pinoy Rock Vols. 1 & 2 (Collector's Edition) | Blackgold Records | BA-5124 | Compilation Producer: Johnny Alegre | 1985 | Compilation 2LP and cassettes |
| Various Artists | Sigaw ng Kalayaan | CFA Records | CFA-006 | Producer: Johnny Alegre | 1986 | Compilation LP, cassette and CD |
| Various Artists | Hitmakers Vol. 6 | Blackgold Records | BA-5132 | Producer (one track only: Zsa Zsa Padilla) | 1989 | Compilation LP and cassette |
| Various Artists | Star Tracks Vol. 1 | Vicor Music / Sunshine Records | TSP-5817 | Producer (two tracks: Albert Albert, Zsa Zsa Padilla) | 1989 | Compilation LP and cassette |
| Zsa Zsa Padilla | Zsa Zsa (the pink album) | Blackgold Records | BA-5115 | Producers: Ed Formoso, Danny Favis, Dante Trinidad. Co-producer: Johnny Alegre. Executive Producer: Vic del Rosario Jr. | 1985 | LP and cassette |
| Zsa Zsa Padilla | Ikaw Lamang | Blackgold Records | BA-5131 | Producer: Chito Ilagan; Co-Producer: Johnny Alegre | 1986 | LP and cassette |
| Zsa Zsa Padilla | Roots & Wings | Blackgold Records | BA-5149 | Producer: Johnny Alegre | 1988 | LP and cassette |
| Zsa Zsa Padilla | Krismas | Blackgold Records | KBA-6171 | Producer: Johnny Alegre | 1990 | Cassette |
| Tadao Hayashi | Tadao Hayashi (self-titled) | Blackgold Records | BA-5125 | Producer: Johnny Alegre | 1986 | LP and cassette |
| Tadao Hayashi | Christmas Wish | Blackgold Records | BA-5138 | Producer: Johnny Alegre | 1986 | LP and cassette |
| Tadao Hayashi | O.P.M. Special | Blackgold Records | BA-5147 | Producer: Johnny Alegre | 1987 | LP and cassette |
| Tadao Hayashi & Friends | Standing Room Only | Blackgold Records | BA-5160 | Producer: Johnny Alegre | 1988 | LP and cassette |
| Universe | Light of Peace | East-West Records Manila | EW-U-1 | Co-Producer: Johnny Alegre | 1987 | LP |
| Salito Malca | 'Till The Fat Lady Sings | Fat Lady Records | AMA-001 | Co-Producer: Johnny Alegre | 1990 | LP |
| Joey Puyat, Johnny Alegre, Dan Gil, Josel Garriz, Richie Quirino | The Concert at Remedios Circle | Puyat Sports | 001 | Producer: Johnny Alegre | 1997 | Live album CD |
| Vivian | Bourbon Street | Bourbon Street Tokushima JP | 001 | Producer: Johnny Alegre | 2011 | CD |
| Melladys | Mga Awit Sa J.P. Rizal | Backspacer Records | MELLA-JA-BR-001 | Producer: Johnny Alegre | 2025 | 2LP |
| Kiss The Bride | KTB | Backspacer Records | JRP-001-BR | Remixed and Co-produced by Johnny Alegre | 2025 | 2LP |

=== Singles ===
| Artist | Side A | Side B | Record label | Catalog | Role | Year |
|---|---|---|---|---|---|---|
| Zsa Zsa Padilla | "When I'm with You" (Rene Novelles) | "When I'm with You" (minus one) (Arranged by Dante Trinidad) | Blackgold Records | BSP-392 | Co-Producers: Ed Formoso, Dante Trinidad, & Johnny Alegre | 1985 |
| Zsa Zsa Padilla | "Eversince" (Alvina Eileen Sy) | "Eversince" (minus one) (Arranged by Dante Trinidad) | Blackgold Records | BSP-397 | Producers: Dante Trinidad & Johnny Alegre | 1985 |
| Zsa Zsa Padilla | "To Love You" (Danny Javier) | "To Love You" (minus one) (Arranged by Menchu Apostol) | Blackgold Records | BSP-401 | Producers: Dante Trinidad & Johnny Alegre | 1985 |
| Zsa Zsa Padilla | "Hiram" (George Canseco) | "Hiram" (minus one) (Arranged by Danny Tan) | Blackgold Records | BSP-404 | Co-Producers: Johnny Alegre & Chito Ilagan; Executive Producer: Vic del Rosario, Jr. | 1986 |
| Zsa Zsa Padilla | "Mambobola" (Rey-An Fuentes) | "Mambobola" (minus one) (Arranged by Homer Flores) | Blackgold Records | BSP-410 | Producer: Chito Ilagan; Associate Producer: Johnny Alegre | 1986 |
| Zsa Zsa Padilla | "Ikaw Lamang" (Dodjie Simon) | "Ikaw Lamang" (minus one) (Arranged by Menchu Apostol) | Blackgold Records | BSP-413 | Producer: Chito Ilagan; Co-Producer: Johnny Alegre | 1986 |
| Zsa Zsa Padilla | "Minsan Pa" (Jun Sta. Maria & Peewee Apostol) | "Minsan Pa" (minus one) (Arranged by Menchu Apostol) | Blackgold Records | BSP-417 | Producer: Chito Ilagan; Co-Producer: Johnny Alegre | 1986 |
| Zsa Zsa Padilla | "Maybe This Time" (Marlene del Rosario) | "Maybe This Time" (minus one) (Arranged by Menchu Apostol) | Blackgold Records | BSP-432 | Producer: Johnny Alegre | 1988 |
| Zsa Zsa Padilla | "Pangako" (Dodjie Simon) | "Pangako" (minus one) (Arranged by Egay Gonzales) | Blackgold Records | BSP-447 | Producer: Johnny Alegre; Executive Producers: Fred Samantela & Chito Ilagan | 1990 |
| Zsa Zsa Padilla | "Ang Aking Pamasko" (Tony Velarde) | "Ang Aking Pamasko" (minus one) (Arranged by Egay Gonzales) | Blackgold Records | BSP-459 | Producer: Johnny Alegre | 1990 |
| Joannie Feliciano | "Kinabukasan" (Rudy delos Reyes) | "Kinabukasan" (minus one) (Arranged by Dante Trinidad) | Sunshine Records | SUN-85-387 | Recording Supervision: Johnny Alegre | 1985 |
| Iwi Laurel | "Come Be a Part of My Song" (Ed Nepomuceno) | "Come Be a Part of My Song" (minus one) (Arranged by Ed Nepomuceno) | Sunshine Records | SUN-85-388 | Producer: Johnny Alegre | 1985 |
| Hourglass | "ILWY" (Johnny Alegre) | In Love with You (Arranged by Johnny Alegre) | Hourglass | Hourglass001 | Producers: Johnny Alegre & Joey Puyat | 2020 |

== As arranger ==
| Artist | Album title | Record label | Catalog | Year | Format |
|---|---|---|---|---|---|
| Children of Siena College and St. James Academy | Mahal Ako Ni Jesus | CFA Records | CFA-003 | 1981 | LP and cassette |
| Louie Heredia | From Another Place and Time | Blackgold Records | BA-5133 | 1989 | LP and cassette |
| Universe | Light of Peace | East-West Records Manila | EW-U-1 | 1987 | LP |
| Various Artists (one track only: Louie Heredia) | Hitmakers Vol. 6 | Blackgold Records | BA-5132 | 1989 | Compilation LP and cassette |
| Various Artists (one track only: Albert Albert) | Star Tracks Vol. 1 | Vicor Music / Sunshine Records | TSP-5817 | 1989 | Compilation LP and cassette |
| Louie Heredia | Nag-iisang Ikaw | Vicor Music | VCD-K-040 | 1994 | CD |
| Hourglass | "ILWY" | Hourglass | Hourglass001 | 2020 | 45-RPM |

== As instrumentalist ==
| Artist | Album title | Imprint | Year | Format |
|---|---|---|---|---|
| Eddie Katindig | Eddie K Jazzmin (one track only: "Jazzmin") | PD Records, Dyna Records | 1982 | LP |
| Universe | Light of Peace | East-West Records Manila | 1987 | LP |
| Albert Albert | Star Tracks Vol. 1 (one track only: I Got Your Number) | Vicor Music / Sunshine Records | 1989 | Compilation LP and cassette |
| Albert Albert | Hitmakers Vol. 7 (one track only: Lost In You) | Sunshine Records | 1989 | Compilation LP and cassette |
| JR COBB Jazz Chamber | Adobo Jazz: Portrait of a Filipino as a Jazz Artist, Vol. 1 | IndiRa Records | 2002 | Compilation CD |
| John B. Power/The IBO Clan | Moon of Compassion | Iboflame Music | 2002 | CD |
| John B. Power/The IBO Clan | I Carry No Stick | Iboflame Music | 2003 | CD |
| Bituin Escalante | UR LUV THANG | Thirdline | 2005 | CD |
| Nyko Maca | (outtakes) | M-Audio | 2008 | CD |
| Mayo Baluyut | Middle Class Sensibilities | Top Banana Productions | 2009 | EP |
| Mammals | Mammals | PH AFFINITY Productions for Japan Music Week | 2010 | CD |
| Pasta Groove | The Distinktive Sounds of Pasta Groove | Terno Recordings | 2010 | Compilation CD |
| Vivian | Bourbon Street | Bourbon Street Tokushima JP | 2011 | CD |
| Hourglass | "ILWY" | Hourglass | 2020 | 45-RPM |
| Daze feat. Alliyah Cadelina | Araw-Araw, Ikaw | Off The Record PH | 2021 | Digital Single |
| River People | Sol Expression | Chap Chap Records (Japan) | 2022 | CD |
| Melladys | Mga Awit Sa J.P. Rizal | Backspacer Records | 2025 | 2LP |

== As composer ==
Here is a partial list of musical compositions contributed by Johnny Alegre to other artists.

| Artist | Title | Imprint | Catalog | Year | Format |
|---|---|---|---|---|---|
| Angela | "Summer Dream" ("Alegre-Jamir") | A&W Records International | AW1015 | 1977 | 45-RPM |
| Albert Albert | "I Got Your Number" | Vicor Music / Sunshine Records | TSP-5817 | 1989 | Compilation LP and cassette |
| Zsa Zsa Padilla | "Himig ng Pasko" | Blackgold Records | KBA-6171 | 1990 | Cassette |
| Passage | "Seasons" | Viva Records | VCD-95-109 | 1995 | CD |
| Passage | "Seasons" (theme from the movie Langit Sa Piling Mo) | Viva Films (executive producer: Eric Quizon) | | 1997 | Movie soundtrack |
