= Amy Morton =

American actress (born 1959)

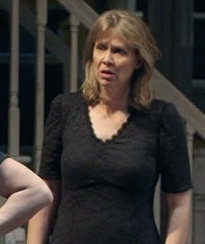
- Morton in 2007
- Born: 1958 or 1959 (age 66–67); Oak Park, Illinois, U.S.
- Occupation: Actress
- Years active: 1983–present
- Spouse(s): Rob Milburn (m. 1997)

Amy Morton (born 1958 or 1959) is an American actress and director, best known for her work in theatre. Morton was nominated two times for a Tony Award for Best Actress in a Play for her performances in August: Osage County and Who's Afraid of Virginia Woolf?. On screen, she is known for her performances in films Rookie of the Year (1993), Up in the Air (2009), The Dilemma (2011) and Bluebird (2013). Since 2014, Morton began starring as Sergeant Trudy Platt in the NBC drama series Chicago P.D.

== Early life and education ==
Amy Morton was born in 1958 or 1959 in Oak Park, Illinois, and attended Oak Park and River Forest High School in Oak Park. She attended both Triton College and Clarke University, but did not graduate.

== Career ==
=== Stage ===
A member of Steppenwolf Theater's core group of actors since 1997, Morton has spent most of her career working in the Chicago theater scene. She has appeared in many stage productions, include Clybourne Park, American Buffalo, Dublin Carol, The Pillowman, Love-Lies-Bleeding and Awake and Sing.

Morton made her Broadway debut as Nurse Ratched, starring opposite Gary Sinise in the Tony Award winning 2001 revival of One Flew Over the Cuckoo's Nest. She originated the role of Barbara in both the original Chicago production and the original Broadway production of Tracy Letts' August: Osage County. For her portrayal she was nominated for both a Tony Award and a Drama Desk Award. Morton reprised the role in the fall 2008 London production at the National Theatre.

She received her second Tony Award for Best Actress in a Play nomination for her leading performance in Who's Afraid of Virginia Woolf? (2012–13).

In 2015, she made her Off-Broadway directing debut with play Guards at the Taj.

=== Screen ===
Morton has appeared in a number of films. She made her feature film debut in a supporting role in 1992 comedy, Straight Talk starring Dolly Parton. In 1993 she had main role as mother of the lead character in Rookie of the Year. The film had a box office success, grossing more than $56 million worldwide. Her next screen role was in the 1999 crime thriller 8mm directed by Joel Schumacher. Ten years later, Morton landed her breakthrough role as George Clooney's character's sister in the critically acclaimed drama film Up in the Air directed by Jason Reitman.

In 2011 she appeared in the comedy-drama film The Dilemma, and in 2013, had the leading role in the critically acclaimed independent film, Bluebird.

On television, Morton guest starred on Crime Story, The Equalizer, ER, Private Practice, and Homeland. From 2011 to 2012, she had the recurring role of Catherine Walsh, the Republican candidate for governor, in the Starz political drama, Boss. From 2013 to 2014, she had another recurring role as Erin Reagan's new boss, Amanda Harris, on the CBS drama, Blue Bloods. In 2014, Morton was cast in the recurring role as Sergeant Trudy Platt in the NBC dramas Chicago Fire and Chicago P.D. Morton was promoted from recurring guest star to series regular from the second season on Chicago P.D.

== Personal life ==
Since 1997, Morton has been married to longtime Steppenwolf colleague, composer / sound designer Rob Milburn; in addition, they have collaborated on miscellaneous stage productions dating back to 1982.

== Filmography ==
=== Film ===
Year	Title	Role	Notes
1992	Straight Talk	Ann	
1993	Falling Down	Mom at Back Yard	
1993	Rookie of the Year	Mary Rowengartner	
1999	8mm	Janet Mathews	
2009	The Greatest	Lydia	
2009	Up in the Air	Kara Bingham	Central Ohio Film Critics Association Award for Best Ensemble; Nominated – Critics' Choice Movie Award for Best Acting Ensemble; Nominated – Denver Film Critics Society Award for Best Acting Ensemble; Nominated – Washington DC Area Film Critics Association Award for Best Ensemble
2011	The Dilemma	Diane Popovich	
2013	Bluebird	Lesley	Karlovy Vary International Film Festival Award for Best Actress
2024	It Ends with Us	Jenny Bloom	

=== Television ===
Year	Title	Role	Notes
1983	Through Naked Eyes	Karen	Television film
1986–1987	Crime Story	Brenda Mahoney/Pregnant Girl	3 episodes
1988	The Equalizer	Gina Rox	Episode: "Eighteen with a Bullet"
1989	The Equalizer	Linda Wilhite	Episode: "Endgame"
1993	Kiss of a Killer	Reba	Television film
2009	ER	Mrs. Walters	Episode: "Shifting Equilibrium"
2011	Private Practice	Leni	Episode: "Who We Are"
2011–2012	Boss	Catherine Walsh	Recurring role, 9 episodes
2013	Homeland	Erin Kimball	Episode: "Tin Man Is Down"
2013–2014	Blue Bloods	Amanda Harris	Recurring role, 5 episodes
2014	Girls	Sissy	Episode: "Flo"
2014–present	Chicago Fire	Sergeant Trudy Platt	Recurring role, 28 episodes
2014–present	Chicago P.D.	Sergeant Trudy Platt	Recurring role (season 1); Main role (season 2–present)
2017, 2019–2020	Chicago Med	Sergeant Trudy Platt	Recurring role, 3 episodes
2017	Chicago Justice	Sergeant Trudy Platt	Episode: "Uncertainty Principle"
2022	The Bear	Nancy Chore	Episode: "Hands"

== Awards ==
Tony Awards

- Nominated – 2008 – Best Actress in a Play – August: Osage County
- Nominated – 2013 – Best Actress in a Play – Who's Afraid of Virginia Woolf?

Drama Desk Awards

- Nominated – 2008 – Best Actress in a Play – August: Osage County
- Nominated – 2013 – Best Actress in a Play – Who's Afraid of Virginia Woolf?

Joseph Jefferson Awards (Chicago, IL)

- Nominated – 1984 – Actress in a Principal Role in a Play – Life and Limb (Wisdom Bridge Theatre)
- Winner – 1986 – Actress in a Supporting Role in a Play – You Can't Take It with You (Steppenwolf Theatre Company)
- Nominated – 1986 – Actress in a Principal Role in a Play – Puntila and his Hired Man (Remains Theatre)
- Nominated – 1987 – Actress in a Principal Role in a Play – Higher Standard of Living (Remains Theatre)
- Nominated – 1988 – Actress in a Supporting Role in a Play – Big Time (Remains Theatre)
- Nominated – 2002 – Director of a Play – Glengarry Glen Ross (Steppenwolf Theatre Company)
- Nominated – 2002 – Actress in a Principal Role in a Play – The Royal Family (Steppenwolf Theatre Company)
- Nominated – 2003 – Actress in a Principal Role in a Play – Homebody/Kabul (Steppenwolf Theatre Company)
- Nominated – 2007 – Actress in a Principal Role in a Play – August: Osage County (Steppenwolf Theatre Company)

Helen Hayes Awards (Washington DC)

- Nominated - 2012 - Outstanding Lead Actress, Non-Resident Production - Who's Afraid of Virginia Woolf
