= Japan Music Week =

Annual music festival, 2009 to 2011

- Location: Tokyo, Japan
- Language: International
- Website: http://www.japanmusicweek.com

Japan Music Week (JMW) was an annual international music showcase festival and convention, covering all kinds of music genres, industry sectors, and regions. JMW first began in 2009 and was centered on the downtown music hub of Shibuya, Tokyo.

Japan Music Week was one of the largest music festivals in Japan, with more than 500 performers from over 40 countries playing in more than 50 venues over 10 days in November at as many as 200 events. JMW attracted a strong following among local musicians and entrepreneurs, as well as bands from abroad. Its focus on emerging talent earned the festival a burgeoning reputation as a breeding ground for music networking in the region.

== History ==
Lynch formed JMW in November 2009 after being sent to American music-industry showcase South by Southwest (SXSW) to make a documentary for Space Shower TV, and developed the idea to start his own festival. "SXSW is a weeklong festival and I think at that time they had about 3,000 artists playing," says Lynch. "Austin is a much smaller city than Tokyo, even though it's kind of set up for conventions, so it just struck me that Tokyo, and Shibuya in particular, would be very suitable for hosting that kind of event.". As founder of the free music-listings magazine Juice and its sister magazine Club Juice, Lynch used his contacts to persuade club owners to adhere to a wristband providing free or discounted access to a number of themed events occurring in live venues around the city.

=== 2009–2011 ===
Japan Music Week kicked off with a big networking party at the well-known Shibuya club, O-East, on November 9, 2009. It was accompanied by panel discussions and seminars, and immediately followed by “Best of Japan,” a concert that aimed to showcase Japan-based artists, such as Kinlay Band and Kev Gray & The Gravy Train. Bands from abroad included the popular New Zealand rap-fusion outfit, Nesian Mystic. However, a lack of funding and the mixed reviews of 2009, saw serious organizational problems for 2010.

=== Criticism and sponsorship ===
Comments on the JMW-related forums criticized the event for its lack of organization and overkill of events, with music ranging from Afghanistan Night to Hong Kong Night, which some musicians felt was clogging up the schedule with empty events for the sake of diversity. The finite number of guests and venues also meant audience figures was split too thinly with some clubs allegedly complaining of low turnouts.

Lynch, together with Tokyo-based events organizer, Jhoana Mendieta, secured sponsorship from Marlboro for the 2011 event, which enabled substantial funding for artists that offer free downloads and set up events. Lynch has stated, “We aim to provide a showcase for emerging artists, and to stimulate the local and international music industry to find strong new directions in the face of its many challenges.”. He clearly stands by his vision, "I believe next year we could have 100 or 200 cities in Japan Music Week."

== Similar festivals ==
Similar festivals elsewhere include the Kansai Music Conference in Osaka, Popkomm in Berlin, North by Northeast (NXNE) in Toronto, North by Northwest (NXNW) in Portland, Oregon and West by Southwest (WXSW) in Tucson, Arizona. On an international scale there is the Fête de la Musique, also known as World Music Day, a music festival taking place around the world on June 21.
