= Submerged (2016 film) =

- Directed by: Steven C. Miller
- Written by: Scott Milam
- Produced by: Lainie Guidry; Brad Kaplan; Tiffany Kuzon
- Starring: Jonathan Bennett; Talulah Riley
- Cinematography: Joseph White
- Edited by: Steven C. Miller
- Music by: Ryan Dodson
- Production companies: Evolution Independent; Thickwater Entertainment; Elevated Films
- Distributed by: IFC Midnight
- Release date: February 12, 2016
- Running time: 98 minutes
- Country: United States
- Language: English

Submerged is a 2016 American survival thriller film directed by Steven C. Miller and written by Scott Milam. The film stars Jonathan Bennett and Talulah Riley.

== Premise ==
A young woman and her friends must battle the elements and a group of kidnappers in order to survive.

== Cast ==
- Jonathan Bennett as Matt
- Talulah Riley as Jessie
- Rosa Salazar as Amanda
- Caleb Hunt as Brandon
- Cody Christian as Dylan
- Giles Matthey as Todd
- Denzel Whitaker as Eddie
- Willa Ford as Carla
- Mario Van Peebles as Hector
- Tim Daly as Hank

== Reception ==
On review aggregator website Rotten Tomatoes, the film holds an approval rating of 25% based on 8 critics, with an average rating of 4.94/10. Jordan Hoffman of The Guardian gave the film two stars out of five.
