= Kansai Music Conference =

International music industry conference in Osaka, Japan

- Dates: October
- Locations: Osaka, Japan
- Years active: 2009 - present
- Website: www.kansaimusicconference.com

Kansai Music Conference (KMC) (Japanese: 関西ミュージックカンファレンス Kansai Myuujikku Kanfarensu), is an international music industry conference based in the city of Osaka, Japan. Established in November 2008 by music industry executive Duane Levi, the conference is an annual event focused on the continual theme of “Building Bridges With Music” to create a global community of artists, industry and music fans for the purpose of promoting cultural exchange through music, artistic collaboration, and cultural awareness.

== History ==
Since the first conference in 2009, KMC has established itself as a global annual event that musicians look forward to joining, a year or more in advance. It was initially created as a music industry conference that was to be similar in design to conferences in other countries like SXSW, WOMEX, MIDEM, and Moshito Music Conference among others. However, due to the uniqueness of the Japanese music market, the original model was not feasible.

=== 2009 ===
The first Kansai Music Conference, KMC 2009 was held on 19 and 20 September 2009 at Convention Room AP Osaka. Among the workshops and discussions, was a memorial celebration for Michael Jackson. There were a total of 16 live music venues used with approx. 52 performing artists and 20 presenters participating.

=== 2010 ===
After recognizing the significant differences between the Japanese music scene and those of western countries, Levi decided to adjust the structure of the conference to focus less on the business of music, and more on building community among artists, music fans and organizations in Japan through international exchange and networking. His idea was to accomplish this through cooperation and coordination with businesses in the Kansai area like hotels, restaurants, cafes and others that could benefit from musicians and tourists coming from to the Kansai area. He also established relationships with tourism bureaus like Osaka Convention & Tourism Bureau, and the Tourism Bureau offices of Malaysia and India. In an August 2010 interview with Musicman, Levi talks about the changes that were made and his vision for the future of the conference. As a result, KMC 2010 was expanded from 2 days to 4 days, ( 17–20 September) which created a 240% increase in participation over 2009, and it featured 63 performing acts from 5 continents along with 19 presenters. The Opening Party was held on the 17th at the music club, Flamingo The Arusha, performances were on the 18th, and the main conference was on the 19th and 20th. The main conference venue was changed to the Osaka Museum of History which also served as co-sponsor of the conference. In response to the 2010 Haiti earthquake, participating musicians did a tribute performance and benefit drive for Haiti refugees.

=== 2011 ===
KMC 2011 was held from 16–19 September, with the same basic schedule as the previous year. However in an effort to further boost attendance and exposure for participating artists, there was the addition of an English rakugo (traditional Japanese comedy in English) show along with two high school concert bands that played in the atrium between the Osaka Museum of History and the NHK Building. There was also a grand finale that featured several performers doing a tribute to the victims of the 2011 Tōhoku earthquake and tsunami. These performers also contributed their music to a KMC tribute video. that was released after the conference.

=== 2012 ===
KMC 2012 (program) was held from 14–17 September. Following the 4 day schedule as in previous years, most of the events took place in downtown Osaka. Among some of the events and performers was a shamisen workshop (traditional Japanese instrument) and an awards ceremony.

=== 2013 ===
KMC 2013 was held from 20–23 September. This year also featured the English rakugo performance, and cited additional support from the Hard Rock Cafe and the Japan Foundation.

=== 2014 ===
The annual music conference was not held in 2014 in order to make structural changes and work on building sponsorships. However, KMC Africa Day was held on 17 May in the Osaka Museum of History and featured a performance by King Mensah from Togo as well as an African Bazaar.

=== 2015 ===
KMC 2015 was held from 18–22 September. The 2015 conference included sponsored events by D'Addario, as well as workshops including the popular English rakugo show and gospel workshops. Also special for 2015 was a feature of music from Latvia.

=== 2016 ===
KMC 2016 was held from 16–18 September. However, due to budget restraints, it was the held simply as a 3-day music festival featuring live performances with no conference sessions. The program was done with the cooperation of the now defunct Life in Kansai magazine as part of their September issue. Six live performance venues were used including Bistro New Orleans, a small cafe located in the Kitahorie area of Osaka as well as Royal Horse a well-known jazz club in the Osaka's Umeda area. Featured artists included Gina Williams from Canada, Stellar Addiction from Australia and Tokyolite from Indonesia.

=== 2017 ===
KMC 2017 was held from 15–17 September in the main areas of Hommachi and Kitahorie in Osaka and Sannomiya in Kobe, with 18 performing artists participating. In order to be more manageable, the overall size of the event had been reduced and only 5 venues were being used for live performances and the main conference venue was moved to the Business Innovation Center Osaka. This was the first year to have an official networking session at the conference venue since 2009, with a total of 38 people from 4 continents in attendance. Another first was the introduction of an online aspect, "KMC Interactive" which incorporated the concept of doing two presentations using digital streaming.

=== 2018 ===
KMC 2018 was held from 14–16 September, again in the main areas of Hommachi and Kitahorie in Osaka. A total of 21 performing acts joined and the conference section was again held at Business Innovation Center Osaka with an interactive session and networking session as well as a panel discussion featuring singer/songwriter, Jett Edwards as a panelist on the topic of playing live performances in Japan.

=== 2019 ===
KMC 2019 was held from 14–16 September, with all venues in the Kitahorie area, with exception of Hard Rock Café Osaka in Hommachi. A total of 22 performing acts participated and a visual art aspect was added with 3 visual artists displaying their works in 3 locations in Kitahorie. The conference was moved to a venue in Kitahorie, Covent Garden, that provided more of a relaxed atmosphere for both the networking session and panel discussion.

=== 2020 ===
Due to the COVID-19 pandemic KMC 2020 was held 18–20 September as a completely online event using social network streaming platforms to show performances and to do presentations and webinars, which were all shown through the top page on the conference website. In the months prior to the main conference, a regular series “Friday Live Spotlight” was created to feature overseas performers doing live performances from their homes, studios or other places that they were able to stream from. There were a total of 30 performing acts and 7 presenters from 5 continents and considering the global situation at that time, it was considered to have been a tremendous success.

=== 2021 ===
With the effects of the pandemic continuing, Japan continued to keep its borders closed to tourists, so KMC was held online again from 17–19 September. However, it was partially done as an in-person event using a live venue in Tokyo, Heaven’s Door, and a venue in Kyoto, Growly. The live performances were all shown through the top page on the conference website, along with live streamed performances by artists from overseas. There were a total of 26 performing acts, 2 presenters and an online panel discussion. As a result of the information shared among musicians during the conference, KMC had also become a valuable online resource for people seeking information about the music scene in Japan.

=== 2022 ===
In June, the Japanese government lifted travel restrictions for tourists to enter the country, so KMC 2022 was able to be held as an in-person event from September 16 – 18. Some participants based overseas were not able to come to Japan on such short notice, so they joined online. Some of the highlights were live music performances on the Santa Maria tour boat, online collaborations featuring youtuber, Dr. Capital and Australian native Jake Murdoch, and an online interview with Ola Ray. However, an approaching typhoon forced schedule changes for the final day, so several performances were canceled as a result.

=== 2023 ===
Due to the increasing prevalence of typhoons in Japan during the month of September, KMC 2023 was pushed into October and held from October 6 – 8, featuring performances at live clubs in Kyoto, Osaka and Kobe as well as two online streamed performances. The main conference was again held at the Osaka Museum of History for the first time since 2015, with presentations and a drum clinic by Moni Lashes and Lawson Jr. Music. Also, as part of the KMC Entertainment Expo, a fashion show was done in conjunction with the Japanese clothing brand Tokkou Fashion.

=== 2024 ===
In preparation for the Expo 2025, the focus for KMC 2024 was to promote SDGs #4, #5, #17 through musical performance. As such, and expansion of the KMC Entertainment Expo involved performances by musicians from each of continents at 5 Osaka City elementary schools. These performances involved not only musical performances, but also cultural exchange through in-person communication and presentation of native cultures that Japanese school kids usually don’t have access to. As an overall success, several schools expressed interest in doing the program again in the future. Also, KMC formed a new partnership with Pasona to have musicians, MAREO! (Chile), Sleepwalker’s Station (Germany) and Agula (Mongolia) perform at “Music Trip Day” as part of Awaji Art Circus in Awajishima, Hyogo.
It was an incredibly wonderful collection of performances, and with live music, it felt like such a luxurious experience. I really enjoyed the unique world that wasn’t like any other circus. I would love to come and see it again. – Audience member
The entire event was a tremendous success. However, due to the excessive expense of audio equipment and transportation, the partnership was discontinued.

== Success Stories ==
KMC has had several accomplishments in its first 3 years. Osaka band Riot Dance Party was able to make their first tour overseas in Australia through connections made with an Aussie band at a KMC show.

Another connection was made when American hip hop artist, Legrand, met with a professor at Temple University Japan Campus in Tokyo to collaborate on a project with college students to create a character in Second Life.

Canadian singer-songwriter Katie Rox has commented on her success at KMC in an interview with Canadian music news site North By East West, saying, “I have noticed CD sales, twitter and Facebook followers have increased since the trip, so I would say it was a success!” Rox explained the value of the conference in her view, saying further that the conference is especially valuable to independent musicians that lack the support of a major label. “You need to make it known who you are. That can be hard without label support.”

KMC has built up a team of sponsors, partners, and supporters, both in Japan and internationally. Also, several charity drives for earthquake victims have been organized by the KMC Executive Board.

Resulting from his online performance for KMC 2021, Cameroon based musician Hervé Nguebo did a collaborative recording project with a Japanese group, NONMALT, that resulted in a CD release followed by a joint tour of Japan in 2023.

== TEAM EXPO ==
In August 2022, the KMC Executive Board joined TEAM EXPO, a group of companies, organizations and individuals who put forth resources to help promote Expo 2025 and SDGs. As a TEAM EXPO partner, KMC created “Entertainment Expo” for the purpose of introducing Japanese audiences to entertainment and culture from each continent. The first Entertainment Expo was held on May 5, 2023, promoting the cultures of North & South America, Australia and Asia. The second was held on October 7, 2023 and featured entertainment from Europe, Africa and Asia. Both events were at the Osaka Museum of History and drew audiences of about 80 people.

== Further activities ==
- Promoting tourism and cultural awareness of the Kansai area to non-Japanese
- Organizing and sponsoring benefits and charity events for causes both in Japan and overseas
- Organizing, co-sponsoring, and facilitating networking events and showcases for musicians and music industry professionals in Japan year-round, with a focus on the Kansai region

== Challenges ==
KMC provides a forum for independent musicians around the world to network with other musicians, music related companies and organizations, experience the live music scene in Japan, as well as participate in seminars, presentations and workshops about music and the music industry. There is little precedent for such an event in Japan.

As an independently organized event, KMC currently does not attract big companies, major label reps, and music industry executives like similar events in other countries, due to the general unfamiliarity of the concept and closed nature of the Japanese music industry. According to Levi, “It’s amazing how artists with such talent are practicing and performing with almost no attention from the music industry… It’s almost impossible for independent musicians in Japan to move up to the next level without help from a major company. KMC is my way of affecting change—a change to a better and more rewarding music scene in Japan.”
