= Denzel Whitaker =

American actor

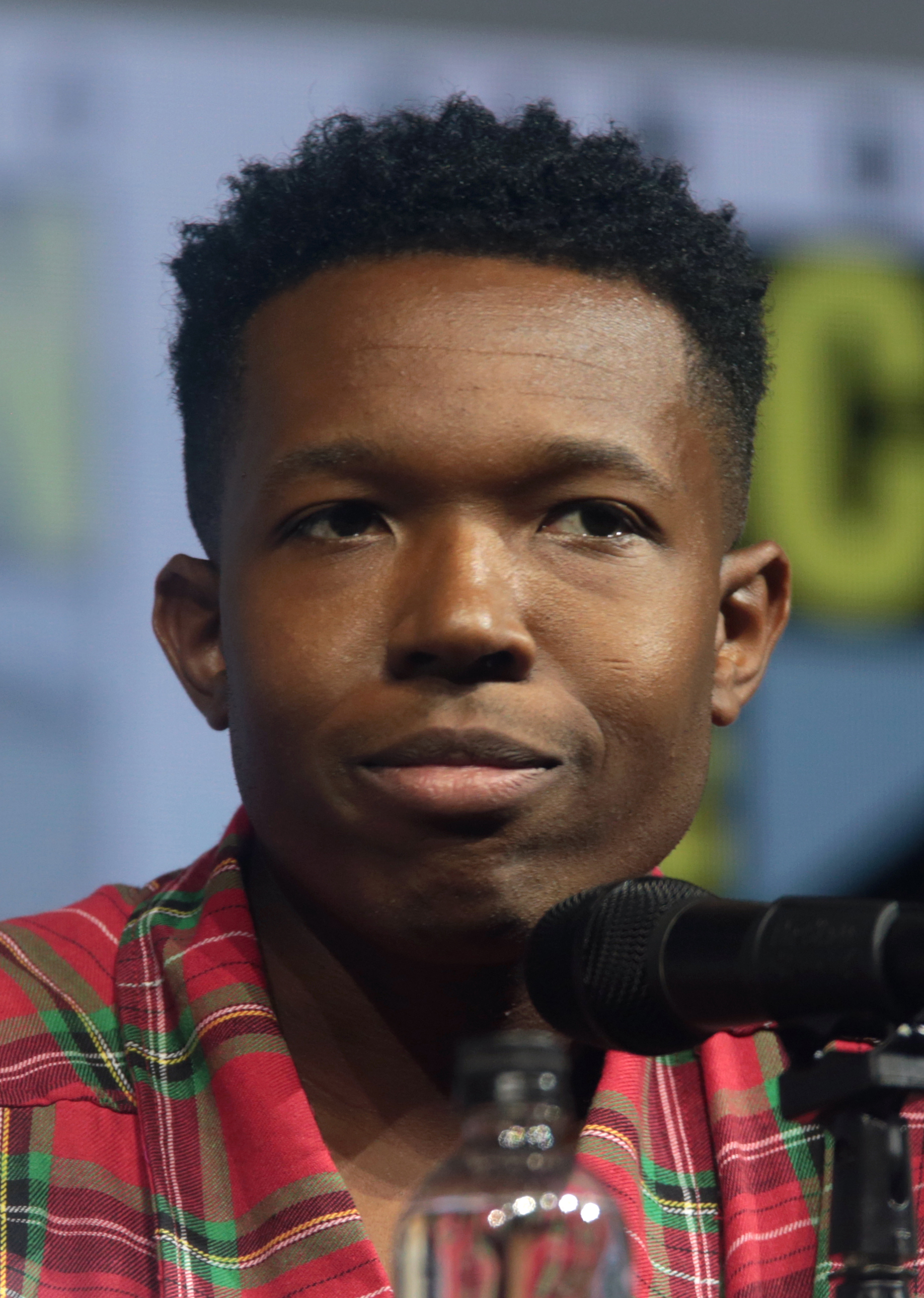
- Whitaker at the 2018 San Diego Comic-Con
- Born: Denzel Dominique Whitaker; June 15, 1990 (age 36); Torrance, California, U.S.
- Occupation: Actor
- Years active: 2001–present

Denzel Dominique Whitaker (born June 15, 1990) is an American actor. Beginning his career as a child actor, he acted in the films Training Day (2001) and The Ant Bully (2006) before portraying James Farmer Jr. in The Great Debaters (2007), earning an NAACP Image Award for his work in the film. His other film work includes My Soul to Take (2010), Abduction (2011) and Black Panther (2018).

On television, Whitaker was a cast member on Nickelodeon's All That between 2004 and 2005. He has appeared in recurring roles on Brothers & Sisters (2009) and The Purge (2019), in addition to guest roles on various series.

== Early life ==
Whitaker was born on June 15, 1990, in Torrance, California, the son of Younalanda and Dale Whitaker. He went to Palos Verdes Peninsula High School, but while acting as a teenager he would receive and conduct schoolwork via email correspondence.

He was named after actor Denzel Washington. Whitaker disputed this fact on The Oprah Winfrey Show while promoting the movie The Great Debaters, only to learn later from his father that, in fact, Washington was his namesake. Washington served as an acting mentor for Whitaker on The Great Debaters.

== Career ==
Whitaker made his acting debut in the 2001 film Training Day as Dimitri. He was a regular cast member during the tenth and final season of the Nickelodeon sketch-comedy series All That.

He portrayed James Farmer Jr. in The Great Debaters (2007). Whitaker's acting in this film was well received, with one reviewer praising his "sweetness and vulnerability" and another describing him as a standout among the younger actors in the film. For his performance as James, Whitaker won the 2008 NAACP Image Award for Outstanding Supporting Actor in a Motion Picture, and received a Young Artist Award nomination.

Whitaker played Sheldon in the Disney Channel Original Movie Dadnapped (2009). Whitaker was a blind teenager named Jerome in Wes Craven's My Soul to Take (2010). In 2011, he performed in two feature films, portraying Gilly in thriller Abduction and appearing in sports drama Warrior.

Whitaker appeared as Eddie in thriller Submerged (2016) and was a young Zuri in the 2018 superhero film Black Panther. He portrayed Andre, an aspiring musician, in the 2020 film Cut Throat City, directed by rapper RZA.

His television work includes ER, The Suite Life of Zack & Cody, The War at Home, Rizzoli & Isles and Blue Bloods. Whitaker also appeared in Werner Herzog's Bad Lieutenant: Port of Call New Orleans.

As a voice actor, Whitaker provided the voice of Albert in The Ant Bully (2006) and portrayed Kyle in preschool series Handy Manny. In the third season of The Boondocks, Whitaker gave voice to Sgt. Gutte, and on Black Dynamite: The Animated Series he played Donald the Accountant.

He has also worked as an assistant voice director for the 2010 film Freaknik: The Musical. Whitaker has directed films and music videos as well.

== Filmography ==
=== Film ===
Year	Title	Role	Notes
2001	Training Day	Dimitri	
2006	The Ant Bully	Albert (voice)	
2007	The Great Debaters	James Farmer Jr.	NAACP Image Award, Outstanding Supporting Actor
2009	Bad Lieutenant: Port of Call New Orleans	Daryl	
2010	My Soul to Take	Jerome	
2011	Abduction	Gilly	
2011	Warrior	Stephon	
2015	Back to School Mom	Noah Riley	
2016	Submerged	Eddie	
2018	Black Panther	Young Zuri	
2019	U Shoot Videos?	Moji	Short film
2019	Will 'The Machine'	Joe Walker	Short film
2020	Cut Throat City	Andre	
2020	No Escape	Thomas	
2021	5150	—N/a	Short film; director and writer
2023	The Angry Black Girl and Her Monster	Kango	

=== Television ===
Year	Title	Role	Notes
2004	One on One	Young Duane	Episode: "You Don't Have to Go Home..."
2004–2005	All That	Denzel	6 episodes
2005	What's New, Scooby-Doo?	Jake / Kid (voice)	Episode: "Camp Comeoniwannascareya"
2005	All That: 10th Anniversary Reunion Special	Denzel	Television special
2005	SpongeBob SquarePants	Background Fish Character (voice)	Uncredited
2005	ER	Hassan	Episode: "Wake Up"
2006	The War at Home	Jeff	2 episodes
2006	Teachers	Martin Sanders	Episode: "Schoolympics"
2007	Handy Manny	Kyle (voice)	Episode: "Join the Club"
2007	The Suite Life of Zack & Cody	Trent	Episode: "Back in the Game"
2009	House Rules	Peter Chiba	Television film
2009	Dadnapped	Sheldon	Television film
2009	CSI: Crime Scene Investigation	Frankie Kirkland	Episode: "No Way Out"
2009	Brothers & Sisters	Carter	3 episodes
2010	R U There?	Max	Television film
2010	Freaknik: The Musical	Fruit Bowl Boys Member (voice)	Television film
2010	The Boondocks	Sgt. Gutter (voice)	Episode: "Bitches to Rags"
2012	Black Dynamite	Donald the Accountant (voice)	Episode: "Taxes and Death or Get Him to the Sunset Strip"
2012	Rizzoli & Isles	Trevor	Episode: "Virtual Love"
2013	Monday Mornings	Nick Villanueva	Episode: "Communion"
2013	Legit	Clay	2 episodes
2015	Blue Bloods	Curtis Turner	2 episodes
2019	The Purge	Darren Moore	7 episodes
2025	The Rookie	Messenger	Episode: "Mad About Murder"
