= American Classic (TV series) =

American television series

- Genre: Comedy-drama
- Created by: Michael Hoffman; Bob Martin
- Starring: Kevin Kline; Jon Tenney; Laura Linney
- Music by: Tom Howe
- Country of origin: United States
- Original language: English
- No. of seasons: 1
- No. of episodes: 8

Production
- Executive producers: Kevin Kline; Michael Hoffman; Bob Martin; Ellen Fairey; Leslie Urdang; Anthony Bregman; Miriam Mintz; David Levine; Garrett Kemble; Jon Tenney; Laura Linney; Kevin Cotter; Todd Sharp; Jill Arthur
- Producer: Sean Fogel
- Production companies: Mar-Key Pictures; Likely Story; Anonymous Content; Fifth Season

Original release
- Network: MGM+
- Release: March 1, 2026 – present

American Classic is an American comedy drama television series from creators Michael Hoffman and Bob Martin. It premiered on March 1, 2026, on MGM+. It stars Kevin Kline, Jon Tenney and Laura Linney.

== Premise ==
A narcissistic Broadway star returns to his hometown after a public meltdown and decides to save his family-run theater by directing and starring in a production of a great American classic.

== Cast ==
=== Main ===
- Kevin Kline as Richard Bean
- Jon Tenney as Jon Bean
- Laura Linney as Kristen Forrest Bean

=== Recurring ===
- Jane Alexander as Ethel Bean
- Jessica Hecht as Polly
- Len Cariou as Linus Bean
- Nell Verlaque as Miranda Bean
- Billy Carter as Connor Boyle
- Elise Kibler as Nadia Romanova
- Ajay Friese as Randall Potts
- Aaron Tveit as Troy
- Stephen Spinella as Xander
- Sean 'Dino' Johnson as Clarence / Joe Crowell
- Johnny McKeown as Hugo Booth
- Philip Johnson Richardson as Heath McCardle
- Billy Eugene Jones as Mr. Pat Paterson
- Andrea Jones-Sojola as Mrs. Pat Paterson
- Yaegal T. Welch as Dr. Derek Seale
- Joseph Morales as Jeff Jeffries
- Matt McGrath as Kenny Klaus
- Sarah Gabriel as Marney
- Terry Walters as Tina / Mrs. Gibbs
- Nadeem Bacchus as Landscaper
- Tony Shalhoub as Alvy

== Episodes ==
No.	Title	Directed by	Written by	Original release date	U.S. viewers (millions)
1	"Pilot"	Michael Hoffman	Michael Hoffman and Bob Martin	March 1, 2026	N/A
2	"Swan Song"	Michael Hoffman	Michael Hoffman and Bob Martin	March 1, 2026	N/A
3	"Juniper Berries"	Tricia Brock	Michael Hoffman and Bob Martin	March 8, 2026	N/A
4	"Big Spender"	Tricia Brock	Michael Hoffman and Bob Martin	March 15, 2026	N/A
5	"Schicklgruber"	Michael Hoffman	Michael Hoffman and Bob Martin	March 22, 2026	N/A
6	"Real Rain"	Michael Hoffman	Ellen Fairey	March 29, 2026	N/A
7	"Camelot"	Michael Hoffman	Ellen Fairey	April 5, 2026	N/A
8	"Our Town"	Michael Hoffman	Michael Hoffman and Bob Martin	April 12, 2026	N/A

== Production ==
=== Development ===
In January 2025, MGM+ gave an eight-episode series order to American Classic, a half-hour comedy starring and executive produced by Oscar winner Kevin Kline and created by Michael Hoffman and Bob Martin. The series has been in the works at MGM+ for more than three years, and was announced as part of the development slate of the platform in February 2022. Following that, Fifth Season came on board as studio, with Mar-Key Pictures, Likely Story and Anonymous Content producing. Writers Hoffman and Martin as well as Ellen Fairey are executive producers alongside Kline, Leslie Urdang, Anthony Bregman, and Miriam Mintz, David Levine and Garrett Kemble for Anonymous Content, with Hoffman directing the pilot episode.

=== Casting ===
The cast, led by Kline, also contained Jon Tenney and Laura Linney, and included Harris Yulin, Jane Alexander, Jessica Hecht, Len Cariou, Billy Carter, Nell Verlaque, Ajay Friese and Elise Kibler. Principal photography was scheduled for New Jersey in the summer of 2025. Filming had begun in June 2025 when Yulin died from a cardiac arrest prior to the commencement of his scenes. Director Hoffman said in a statement "All of us at American Classic have been blessed by our experience with him. He will always remain the beating heart of our show.” In July, Yulin's character was recast by Len Cariou, and was joined with additional cast in recurring roles. The casting of Tony Shalhoub, Aaron Tveit and Stephen Spinella were revealed in January 2026.

== Release ==
The series premiered on March 1, 2026, with the first two episodes, followed by a weekly release leading into the season finale on April 12.

== Reception ==
The review aggregator website Rotten Tomatoes reported a 94% approval rating based on 18 critic reviews. Metacritic, which uses a weighted average, gave a score of 70 out of 100 based on 8 critics, indicating "generally favorable" reviews.
