= Emily Meade =

American actress

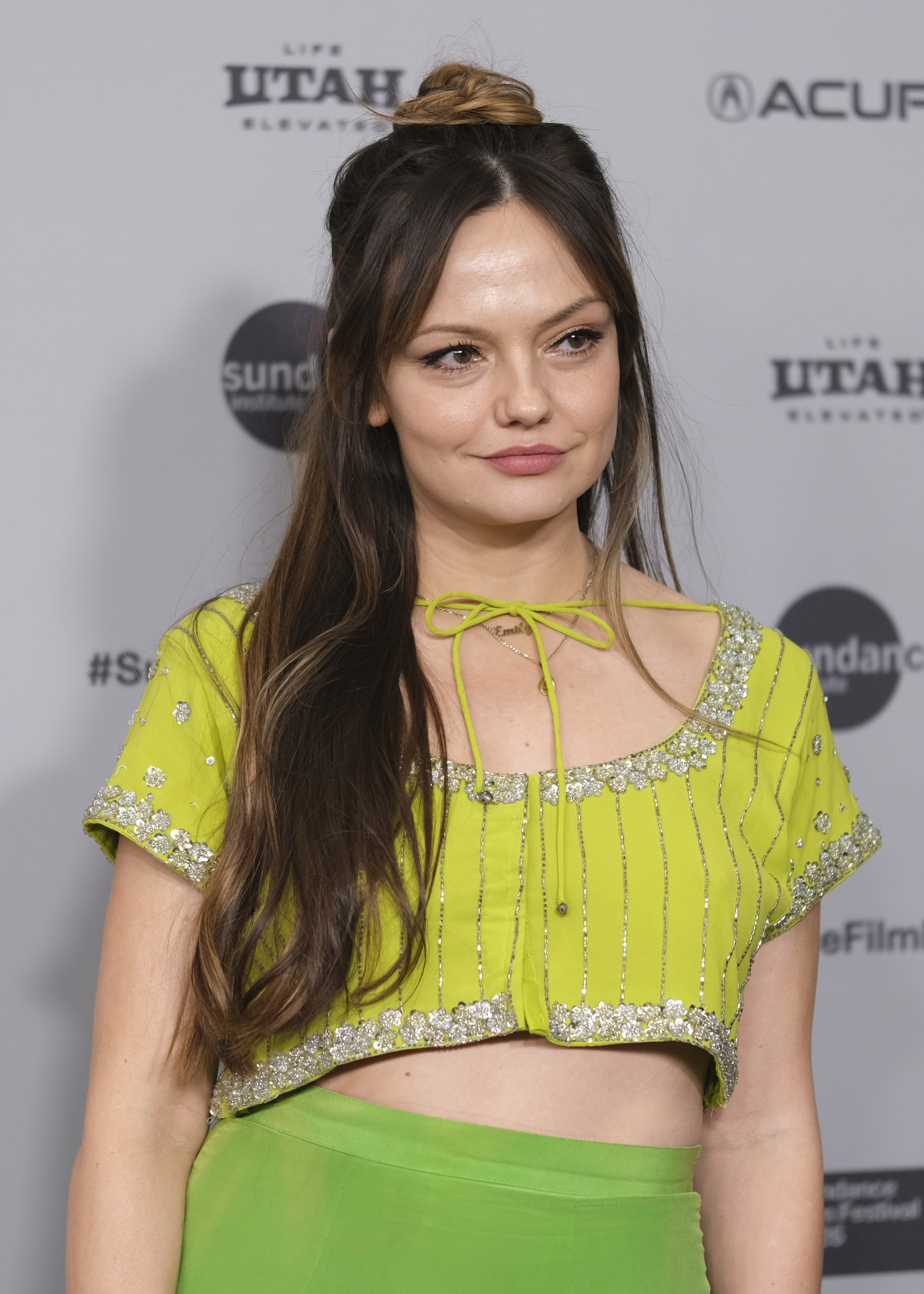
- Meade at Sundance Film Festival in 2026
- Born: January 10, 1989 (age 37); New York City, U.S.
- Occupation: Actress
- Years active: 2006–present

Emily Meade (born January 10, 1989) is an American film and television actress. She has appeared in films such as Twelve (2010), My Soul to Take (2010), Gimme Shelter (2013), That Awkward Moment (2014), Money Monster (2016), and Nerve (2016), and the television series Boardwalk Empire, Law & Order: Special Victims Unit, The Leftovers and Broad City. She also portrayed a future version of the character Ella Blake in the third season finale of Fringe, and had a leading role in the HBO series The Deuce (2017–2019).

== Life and career ==
In 1997, at the age of seven, she sang "Up, over, through and under" (Sottosopra) at the Italian song contest Zecchino d'Oro. The song won the Zecchino d'Argento prize for the best non-Italian song.

She then starred in My Soul to Take, directed by Wes Craven. Co-stars included Max Thieriot and Nick Lashaway. She starred in the 2010 release, Twelve as a teenage drug addict. Meade appeared in the independent drama, Bluebird, in 2013. She had a supporting role in the first season of the HBO drama, The Leftovers. In 2016, she portrayed Sydney in the film Nerve starring Dave Franco and Emma Roberts. She received considerable critical acclaim for her portrayal of sex worker and porn star Lori Madison in HBO's The Deuce, creator David Simon describing her performance as "one of the best I ever got on a show".

After the 2017 Weinstein scandal and the Me Too movement highlighted the often routine nature of sexual harassment and misconduct in the film industry, Meade was one of the first performers to demand professional safeguards for their well-being on set, leading to the presence of an intimacy coordinator on film and television series.

== Filmography ==
=== Film ===
Year	Title	Role	Notes
2006	The House Is Burning	Anne	
2008	Assassination of a High School President	Tiffany Ashwood	
2010	Twelve	Jessica Brayson	
2010	Burning Palms	Chloe Marx	
2010	My Soul to Take	Leah "Fang" Hellerman	
2011	Silver Tongues	Rachel	
2011	Trespass	Kendra	
2011	Young Adult	Denny's Waitress	
2012	Sleepwalk with Me	Samantha	
2012	Adventures in the Sin Bin	Suzie	
2012	Thanks for Sharing	Becky	
2013	Bluebird	Paula	
2013	Gimme Shelter	Cassandra	
2014	That Awkward Moment	Christy	
2014	Gabriel	Alice	
2015	Me Him Her	Gabbi	
2015	Charlie, Trevor and a Girl Savannah	Savannah	
2016	Money Monster	Molly	
2016	Nerve	Sydney Sloane	
2018	Trial by Fire	Stacy Willingham	
2026	Union County	Katrina Parsons	
TBA	Running †		Filming

=== Television ===
Year	Title	Role	Notes
2008–2011	Law & Order: Special Victims Unit	Anna / Corinne Stafford	Guest role; 2 episodes
2009	Back	Shannon Miles	Television film
2010–2024	Law & Order	Bonnie Jones / Amanda Evans / Laura Kingsbury	2 episodes
2010	Boardwalk Empire	Pearl	Guest role; 2 episodes
2011	Fringe	Ella Dunham	Episode: "The Day We Died"
2013	Trooper	Eloise	Television film
2014	The Leftovers	Aimee	Main role (season 1); 6 episodes
2016	Broad City	Maxanne	Episode: "Two Chainz"
2016	Mother, May I Sleep with Danger?	Pearl	Television film
2017–2019	The Deuce	Sarah / Lori Madison	Main role; 25 episodes
2023	Dead Ringers	Susan	Miniseries
2024	The Penguin	Young Francis Cobb	Miniseries; 2 episodes
2026	Tell Me Lies	Mary	TBD; TBD episodes
