= Union County (film) =

- Theatrical release poster
- Directed by: Adam Meeks
- Written by: Adam Meeks
- Produced by: Brad Becker-Parton; Martha Gregory; Stephanie Roush; Faye Tsakas; Sean Weiner; Will Poulter
- Starring: Will Poulter; Noah Centineo; Elise Kibler; Emily Meade; Annette Deao
- Cinematography: Stefan Weinberger
- Edited by: Adam Meeks; Sean Weiner
- Music by: Celia Hollander
- Production companies: Ley Line Entertainment; Seaview Productions
- Distributed by: Oscilloscope Laboratories
- Release dates: January 25, 2026 (Sundance); August 14, 2026 (United States)
- Running time: 97 minutes
- Country: United States
- Language: English
- Box office: $201,782

Union County is a 2026 American drama film written and directed by Adam Meeks. It stars Will Poulter, Noah Centineo, Elise Kibler, Emily Meade, and Annette Deao.

It had its world premiere at the 2026 Sundance Film Festival on January 25, 2026, and was released on August 14, 2026, by Oscilloscope Laboratories. The film received critical acclaim.

== Plot ==
In Union County, Ohio, participants in drug court report into the judge and treatment team on their recovery efforts. The newest participant, Cody Parsons, introduces himself. His foster brother, Jack, is also in the program. Cody checks-in with his probation officer and takes a drug test. Homeless, Cody lives out of his car in a secluded forest. Jack helps Cody get a job at a lumber yard.

Jack takes Cody to a bonfire party where he meets Anna. At the party, Jack consumes alcohol and fails his next drug test; when the pair report in for drug court, the judge warns Jack that continued violations of the rules could result in termination from the program and jail time. Over the following few days, Cody observes Jack's demeanor change; he becomes disassociated and aggravated. The pair decide to visit a drug dealer and purchase heroin. After injecting, Cody passes out and crashes his car into a tree. He awakens to find Jack gone and his car inoperable. He walks miles through a rural area and breaks into a home, falling asleep on the couch.

The following morning, Cody is awoken by his young niece. His sister, Katrina, calls Cody's probation officer who arrives to arrest him. Cody is booked into the drug detox unit in jail and is visited by Annette, the drug court social worker, who offers him help. She takes Cody to receive a Vivitrol injection, and he is required to move into a halfway house. He learns Jack has been court ordered into a residential treatment center in Greene County.

Cody spends his days working, fixing his car, and becomes acquainted with Anna, who he learns is in recovery herself and works as a peer supporter for the women's halfway house across the street. When Jack tries to call Cody, he decides not to answer. Cody attends Narcotics Anonymous meetings, revealing he has been addicted to opiates since he was 17, and feels tremendous guilt for having introduced them to Jack, which also caused a falling out with their sister. As time passes, Cody remains sober and begins reflecting on the damage he caused. He attempts to reconcile the relationship with his sister, and builds a support system with Anna and his fellow drug court participants. Cody learns he is being passed into phase two of drug court.

As Cody prepares for his second phase of drug court, he learns that Jack has died of a drug overdose. Distraught, Cody buys heroin. As he prepares to use, he instead decides to call Annette, whose support keeps him from relapsing. Cody attends drug court and reads a letter aloud, thanking his support system and his motivation for staying in recovery, including doing so to honor Jack's memory.

== Cast ==
- Will Poulter as Cody Parsons
- Noah Centineo as Jack Parsons
- Elise Kibler as Anna
- Emily Meade as Katrina Parsons
- Annette Deao as Annette
- Danny Wolohan as Jim
- Kevin P. Braig as a judge

== Production ==
Principal photography took place in Ohio from April 21 to May 16, 2025, on a new drama film, written and directed by Adam Meeks, and Will Poulter, Noah Centineo, Elise Kibler, Emily Meade, and Annette Deao rounding out the main cast. It was shot in a real drug court and a lot of the supporting cast (including Annette Deao) were non-actors playing fictionalized versions of themselves; some were working the program itself.

== Release ==
Union County premiered at the Sundance Film Festival in Park City and Salt Lake City, Utah on January 25, 2026. In April 2026, Oscilloscope Laboratories acquired distribution rights to the film. A theatrical release happened on August 14, 2026.

== Reception ==
On the review aggregator website Rotten Tomatoes, 94% of 54 critics' reviews are positive, with an average rating of 7.3/10. The website’s consensus reads: "Union County is an austere yet deeply compassionate portrait of addiction and recovery, finding clear-eyed humanity in the difficult, often cyclical work of rebuilding lives." Metacritic, which uses a weighted average, assigned the film a score of 72 out of 100, based on 11 critics, indicating "generally favorable" reviews.
