= My Soul to Take =

2010 American film by Wes Craven

- Theatrical release poster
- Directed by: Wes Craven
- Written by: Wes Craven
- Produced by: Wes Craven; Anthony Katagas; Iya Labunka
- Starring: Max Thieriot; Denzel Whitaker; Raul Esparza; Shareeka Epps
- Cinematography: Petra Korner
- Edited by: Peter McNulty
- Music by: Marco Beltrami
- Production companies: Rogue Pictures; Relativity Media; Corvus Corax
- Distributed by: Universal Pictures
- Release date: October 8, 2010
- Running time: 107 minutes
- Country: United States
- Language: English
- Budget: $25 million
- Box office: $21.5 million

My Soul to Take is a 2010 American supernatural slasher film produced, written, and directed by Wes Craven, marking the first time he had filled all three roles since Wes Craven's New Nightmare in 1994. The film stars Max Thieriot as Adam "Bug" Hellerman, who is one of seven teenagers chosen to die following the anniversary of a serial killer's death. Denzel Whitaker, Raul Esparza, and Shareeka Epps also star. The film's title comes from a line in the prayer "Now I Lay Me Down to Sleep", which reads "If I should die before I wake, I pray the Lord my soul to take": Craven previously used the prayer as a mantra of Nancy Thompson in A Nightmare on Elm Street.

My Soul to Take was released by Relativity Media and Universal Pictures on October 8, 2010. It was unsuccessful at the box office, grossing just $21 million against its $25 million budget, and received mostly negative reviews from critics.

The film was one of Craven’s final slasher works before he died in 2015 and was later reappraised by horror fans, gaining a small cult following that considers it underrated.

== Plot ==
Family man Abel Plenkov, a sufferer of dissociative identity disorder, accidentally discovers that he is the Riverton Ripper, a local, masked serial killer. After killing his pregnant wife, Sarah, and then his psychiatrist, he is shot down and carted away in an ambulance, leaving his young daughter Leah and premature son orphaned. On the way to the hospital, a paramedic suggests that Plenkov himself is innocent but that he houses multiple souls, with the Ripper's being one of them. Near death, Plenkov unexpectedly revives, slashing the paramedic in the throat, causing the ambulance to crash and burn. 7 children born on the same day as Plenkov's death, who supposedly carry his personality traits, are dubbed the Riverton 7.

16 years later, the Riverton 7 – the blind Jerome King, the unpopular Alex Dunkelman, the creative Jay Chan, the timid Adam "Bug" Hellerman, the religious Penelope Bryte, the beautiful Brittany Cunningham, and the athletic Brandon O'Neil — gather for the annual ritual of "killing" a Ripper puppet to prevent his return superstitiously. Bug is elected to perform the kill but fails to do so. Not long after, Jay is murdered by the reappeared Ripper. At home, Bug begins to redo a class project, exhibiting Jay's creativity.

Brandon torments Bug and Alex at school on orders of Fang, a tyrannical bully. Bug and Alex spy on Fang to see if Brittany has a crush on him. During their surveillance, Fang cruelly alleges that Bug had previously been in institutions for killing people. Bug begins unwittingly imitating the rest of the Riverton 7 and Fang. Having predicted the Ripper's return and their deaths, Penelope is the next one killed. Brandon and Brittany discover her body in the woods and are both stabbed to death.

That night, Fang, revealed to be Bug's sister and going by her name of Leah, gives her brother a birthday present: a rocking horse created by Abel Plenkov. Angrily, she unveils the truth that had long been hidden: that they are his children, and she is the daughter he had failed to kill. Bug had survived in his dead mother's womb, albeit born prematurely. Everyone saw him as a miracle, which caused Fang to harbor lifelong resentment towards him; she had been traumatized by the event, but he remained innocent of its memory. The two reconcile but are informed of the murders.

Alex visits a distressed Bug and theorizes that the Ripper's evil soul jumped into one of the Riverton 7, forcing them to kill off the others. Downstairs, Bug and Fang encounter the Ripper. Just as Bug is about to be killed, the Ripper hears a noise upstairs. Bug goes back to his room and discovers Jerome, mortally wounded, in his closet. After Jerome dies, Alex reappears and suggests that Bug inherited Dissociative Identity Disorder from his father and had unknowingly killed everyone. Bug rejects this idea. The souls of the dead 7 are now part of him, and together, they help him deduce that Alex is, in fact, the one with the Ripper's soul. "Alex" admits guilt and confesses his revenge. He proposes that they kill Fang and pin the murders on Jerome to appear as heroes. Bug refuses, stabbing Alex in the stomach. Freed from the Ripper's soul, Alex dies as himself in a touching moment between best friends.

Although Bug expects to be arrested, Fang tells the police everything, clearing his name. The town proclaims him a hero. Despite not feeling like one, he narrates that he would "fake it good" to honor Alex's memory.

== Cast ==
- Max Thieriot as Adam 'Bug' Hellerman
- John Magaro as Alex Dunkelman
- Denzel Whitaker as Jerome King
- Zena Grey as Penelope Bryte
- Nick Lashaway as Brandon O'Neil
- Paulina Olszynski as Brittany Cunningham
- Jeremy Chu as Jay Chan
- Emily Meade as Leah 'Fang' Hellerman
- Raul Esparza as Abel Plenkov
- Jessica Hecht as May Hellerman
- Frank Grillo as Detective Frank Patterson
- Danai Gurira as Jeanne-Baptiste
- Harris Yulin as Dr. Blake
- Shareeka Epps as Chandelle King
- Dennis Boutsikaris as Principal Pratt
- Felix Solis as Chela
- Trevor St. John as Lake
- Lou Sumrall as Quint
- Alexandra Wilson as Sarah Plenkov
- Michael Bell as Podcast guest

== Production ==
The film is produced by Anthony Katagas and Iya Labunka, Craven's wife.

=== Casting ===
Henry Hopper, son of actor Dennis Hopper, was originally cast in the lead role of Bug, but was replaced by Thieriot after Hopper contracted mononucleosis. Accompanying Thieriot is John Magaro as Alex Dunkelman, Adam's friend who is abused regularly by his sadistic and boorish stepfather, Quint (Lou Sumrall). Paulina Olszynski plays Brittany Cunningham, who shares a mutual secret attraction to Adam. Nick Lashaway plays Brandon O'Neal, a "dashing, athletic jock" and "the handsomest boy in his school" who is attracted to Brittany. Emily Meade plays Leah ("Fang"). Zena Grey, Denzel Whitaker, Trevor St. John, Raúl Esparza, and Shareeka Epps also star.

=== Filming ===
Production began in April 2008, under the working title 25/8, originally aiming for an October 2009 release. Craven described the killer in March 2009 as "a figure who lives under the river", eats bark, and lives in the woods since his alleged death.

Although many of the main scenes were filmed in multiple rural Massachusetts towns, with the majority of outdoor scenes by the river and covered bridge being shot in Kent, CT at Bull's Bridge, many of the high school scenes were shot in the then-vacant Tolland High School (now Tolland Middle School) in Tolland, Connecticut. Other scenes were filmed in New Milford, CT, Gaylordsville, CT and Westhill High School in Stamford, CT.

=== Post-production ===
The film was shot in 2D. Because of the rising popularity of 3D films, it was post-converted to 3D.

== Release ==
My Soul to Take was theatrically released on October 8, 2010, with screenings in 3-D. The trailer was attached to Resident Evil: Afterlife and Devil. The film opened at #4 on its opening Friday, but ultimately placed at #5 for the weekend with $6,842,220 behind The Social Network, Life as We Know It, Secretariat, and the previous 3D screen holder Legend of the Guardians: The Owls of Ga'Hoole, in its third weekend. It had placed the record for the lowest opening of a 3D film released at over 1500 venues, claiming the record from Alpha and Omega until Gulliver's Travels claimed the record two months later.

At the end of its run, the film had grossed $14,744,435 at the US box office and $6,740,619 overseas for a worldwide total of $21,485,054. My Soul to Take was released on DVD and Blu-ray on February 8, 2011.

== Reception ==
On Rotten Tomatoes the film holds an approval rating of 11% from 65 reviews, with an average rating of 3.4/10. The site's critics consensus reads: "Dull, joyless, and formulaic, My Soul to Take suggests writer/director Wes Craven ended his five-year filmmaking hiatus too soon." On Metacritic, the film has a weighted average score of 25 out of 100 based on 13 critics, indicating "generally unfavorable reviews". Audiences polled by CinemaScore gave the film an average grade of "D" on an A+ to F scale.

Despite the negative reviews, Craven said he was proud of the film: "When you do a film like My Soul to Take and people think it sucks, that hurts. We put a lot of work into it and it's a good film, but you go on."

However, it was revisited a decade later and has since been regarded as one of Wes Craven’s most underrated slasher films.
