= Bluebird (2013 film) =

- Theatrical release poster
- Directed by: Lance Edmands
- Written by: Lance Edmands
- Produced by: Garrett P. Fennelly; Kyle Martin; Alexander Schepsman
- Starring: Amy Morton; John Slattery; Louisa Krause; Emily Meade; Margo Martindale; Adam Driver
- Cinematography: Jody Lee Lipes
- Edited by: Lance Edmands; Dino Jonsäter
- Music by: Danny Bensi; Saunder Jurriaans
- Production companies: Act Zero Films; Film i Väst; Killer Films; Rooks Nest Entertainment; SeeThink Films; Washington Square Films
- Release date: April 18, 2013 (Tribeca Film Festival)
- Running time: 90 minutes
- Countries: United States; Sweden
- Language: English

Bluebird is a 2013 drama film written and directed by Lance Edmands. Set and filmed in Northern Maine, it tells the story of how a school bus driver's momentary distraction causes a near-tragedy and affects the whole community. It co-stars Amy Morton, Margo Martindale, John Slattery, Emily Meade, Louisa Krause and Adam Driver. It was filmed in Winter 2012. After opening in limited release on February 27, 2015, it was released on the web on March 1.

Edmands finished the first draft of the screenplay in 2009. During the film's production, it received assistance and funding from the Sundance Institute, the San Francisco Film Society and the Swedish Film Institute. It premiered as part of the World Narrative Feature Competition at the 2013 Tribeca Film Festival.

== Cast ==
- Amy Morton as Lesley
- John Slattery as Richard
- Louisa Krause as Marla
- Emily Meade as Paula
- Margo Martindale as Crystal
- Adam Driver as Walter

== Reception ==
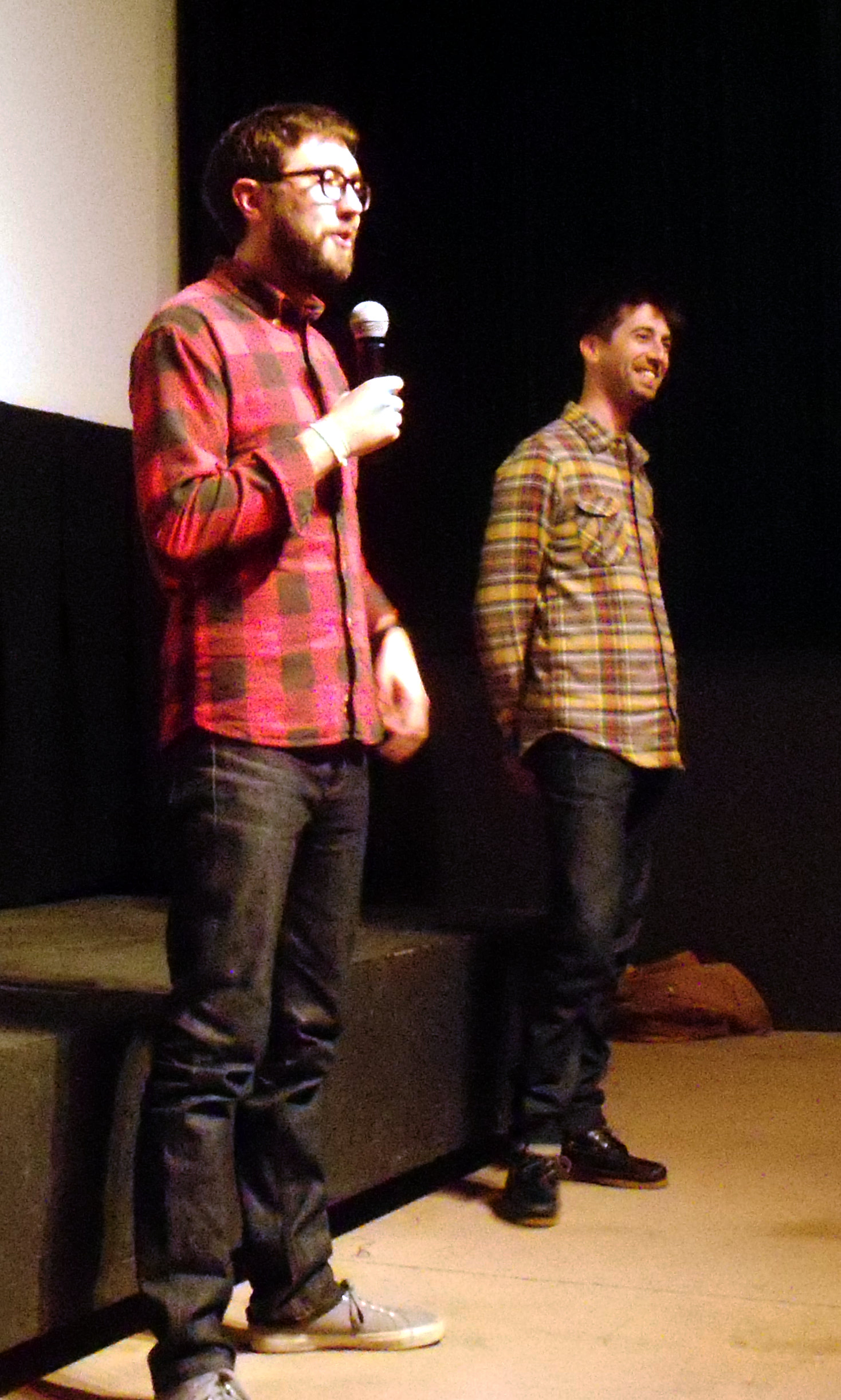
Lance Edmands (director) and Kyle Martin (producer) answer questions after the first Maine screening on May 4, 2013

David Rooney of The Hollywood Reporter called it "a quietly affecting indie drama likely to win admirers." Indiewire's Rodrigo Perez commented that "Edmands resists all levels of melodrama and sentimentality in Bluebird and yet the picture is just as arresting and emotional as any drama [he's] seen this year, albeit in a quiet manner." Francisco Salazar, writing in Latinos Post, says that "the film's tonal congruity and top-notch performances will surely resonate." Film School Rejects's Kate Erbland mentions that "[c]omparisons to Atom Egoyan's The Sweet Hereafter will likely plague Lance Edmands' Bluebird, thanks to the films' similar subject matter", but comments that "what's most remarkable about Bluebird is its consistently solid performances, many of which frequently approach just flat-out greatness." Stephen Holden of The New York Times, on the other hand, says it "tries a little too hard for atmosphere" but praises Morton's "quietly extraordinary portrayal". Peter Debruge of Variety calls it "a mournful throwback to more poetically inclined times", but says that "Edmands maintains too measured a pace as he cycles through the various lives affected".
