= The Sunlit Night =

2019 film directed by David Wnendt

- Film poster
- Directed by: David Wnendt
- Written by: Rebecca Dinerstein Knight
- Based on: The Sunlit Night by Rebecca Dinerstein Knight
- Produced by: Fabian Gasmia; Ruben Thorkildsen; Jenny Slate; Gabrielle Nadig; Michael B. Clark; Alex Turtletaub
- Starring: Jenny Slate; Alex Sharp; Fridtjov Såheim; David Paymer; Gillian Anderson; Zach Galifianakis
- Cinematography: Martin Ahlgren
- Edited by: Andreas Wodraschke
- Music by: Enis Rotthoff
- Production companies: Beachside Films; DETAiLFILM; Ape&Bjørn
- Distributed by: Quiver Distribution
- Release dates: January 26, 2019 (Sundance); July 17, 2020 (United States)
- Running time: 106 minutes (Sundance premiere); 81 minutes (VOD)
- Countries: United States; Germany; Norway
- Language: English

The Sunlit Night is a 2019 romantic comedy-drama film directed by David Wnendt, from a screenplay by Rebecca Dinerstein Knight, based on her 2015 novel of the same name. It stars Jenny Slate (who also co-produced) as a New York painter finding herself on assignment in a remote village in Norway, with Alex Sharp, Fridtjov Såheim, David Paymer, Gillian Anderson, and Zach Galifianakis in supporting roles.

The film had its world premiere at the Sundance Film Festival on January 26, 2019, and was released on digital and VOD on July 17, 2020, by Quiver Distribution.

== Summary ==
The Sunlit Night follows "American painter Frances and émigré Yasha — an unlikely pair who find each other in the Arctic circle. Frances has arrived to jumpstart her career while Yasha has come to bury his father in the land of the Vikings. Together under a sun that never quite sets, they let go of the past."

== Plot ==
Frances in the opening scene begins with some art evaluators evaluating her work rather harshly. She is soon shown as breaking up with her boyfriend. She returns to her parents' apartment who are also painters & artists. Her mother does interior textiles for wealthy people while her dad illustrates medical books.

Frances informs her sister Gabby that she showed up unannounced from the lake house of her boyfriend because she has broken up with him. Her parents are also told of the bad news and her mom notices that Frances has a leech attached to her posterior. While the mother removes the leech, Frances gets a text informing her that her residency in Tokyo went to another artist. The dad and other daughter set up the table. During the meal Frances' sister announces that she is getting married. Her father announces that he and their mother are separating. There is an awkward silence as the rejoicing over the other sister's marriage is cut short. Her father explains that he does not approve of the choice of husband made by Gabby.

He takes Frances to his working area and allots her a small space to work while he tells Frances that he is afraid how Gabby will take care of herself. Frances tells him that Gabby will be fine because she is in law school.

Frances is next seen speaking to a career counselor who informs her that she is being placed with an artist Nils Auerman in Norway (a remote part in the North of Norway "Not Oslo").

Frances arrives in Norway to be picked up by a taciturn and irritable Nils. Frances showers him with praise and admires the land comparing it to a painting. The two of them drive to her residence which is a trailer parked by the water. The bathroom and shower are in the house near the trailer. The first night she cannot sleep because the sun is always up and the curtains are not thick enough to block the light.

The next day she is taken to work on a barn which is she is supposed to paint with Nils. She watches with anticipation as the car passes by a "Viking Village". They drive past the locals, the Viking museum and archers practicing archery to an old barn which is in the process of being painted yellow. Nils constantly discourages her enthusiasm by telling her not to use the word "amazing" to describe the "hard work" ahead of her. She is given instructions to paint the interior of the barn while Nils paints the exterior. She assumes it is paint by numbers and begins working.

She goes to the grocery store to shop and notices a grocery clerk who reminds her of a goddess from the Renaissance paintings of the past. She is shocked that the clerk is working behind the freezer stacking dairy products onto the shelves. She tries talking to the girl but she gets an indifferent stare so she continues with her shopping. Nils invites her to dinner and makes her a dinner with fish. When she returns to her room she notices that there are goats around her trailer and one of the goats has entered her room.

The next day she notices Yasha walking by the side of the road and asks Nils to stop and pick him up but Nils refuses and wants to go directly to work. At work when she asks Nils when and where she can paint her own works Nils says that it won't be possible because they will be working from 7 to 7.

One day she notices some people practicing archery and engaged in medieval arts like coloring yarn and making ancient weapons and armor. She visits the museums and meets Haldor a gentleman from Cincinnati who takes the Viking lifestyle very seriously and thinks he is the Chief.

When she returns to work Nils is upset and asks her never to leave her work. He then berates her painting technique by manhandling her. Frances gets upset and leaves. She goes to a restaurant and notices Yasha behind her attempting to order pancakes. Yasha also reminds Frances of a boy from the paintings of the masters. She tries talking to Yasha but he seems despondent, pensive, and lost. She turns around to ask him to join her table when she notices that he has disappeared.

When she returns to her trailer Nils has given her a flower by her doorstep and is apologetic to her. He explains to her that they are two contrasting colors "orange and blue". They return to work next day when Frances sees Yasha enter the Viking museum.

When she jumps out of the car to accost him she finds out that he is there to attend to his father's funeral. He was a Russian gentleman who wished for a Viking funeral. Yasha's father was a baker and employed him in the bakery. Around this time Yasha's mother arrives (Olyana). Haldor asks her to leave because Yasha refuses to recognize anyone else. They soon gather together to see the frozen body of Yasha's father. Yasha cries over it saying he is "finally free".

Soon after they proceed to carry the coffin by the seashore and place it in a replica of a Viking ship. Haldor attempts to recite a Viking greeting but Yasha instead speaks about his father and what a good person he was. They light the funeral pyre and disperse.

Frances and Yasha summit a hill, drink, and then return to the barn and make love. As they are lying on the floor au natural the Norwegian Art Institute (NKI) representatives arrive to inspect the barn. Frances leaves with Yasha, both apologizing. Nils just stares silently at them.

Soon Frances returns to New York. Haldor wonders if he is a "troll". The grocery store clerk (and subject of Frances's paintings) tells Haldor that she likes trolls : people who work in cold dark places and are big and strong and it is implied that maybe Haldor has found a friend.

When Frances returns her sister is married and her Dad makes an anxious speech about how worried he is that she has married out of her own free choice ignoring the advice of her parents. Frances receives a letter from Nils informing her that the barn she and Nils painted together has passed inspection and is now on the map. Nils appended a map to the letter, to which Frances smiles and remarks that Nils's work was not as fragile as she first believed. The closing scene is that of Frances' work being displayed and hailed as exceptional by the art school evaluators who previously criticized her work.

== Cast ==
- Jenny Slate as Frances
- Alex Sharp as Yasha
- Zach Galifianakis as Haldor
- Gillian Anderson as Olyana
- Dan Puck as Robert
- Fridtjov Såheim as Nils
- David Paymer as Levi
- Jessica Hecht as Mirela
- Elise Kibler as Gaby
- Justus von Dohnányi as Ian
- Olek Krupa as Vassily
- David Corenswet as Scott Glenn

== Production ==
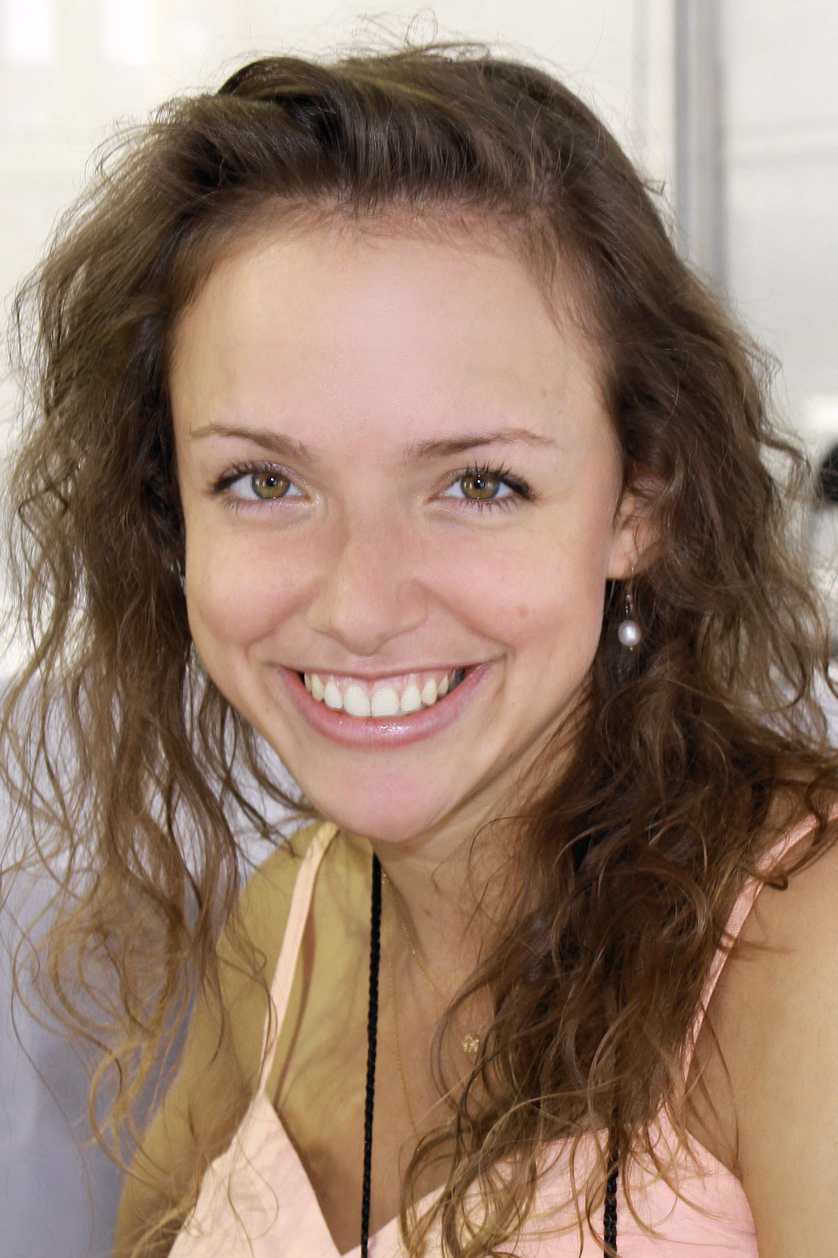
Author Rebecca Dinerstein

On May 3, 2018, it was announced that David Wnendt would direct an adaptation of Rebecca Dinerstein's novel The Sunlit Night. Producers are set to include Jenny Slate, Fabian Gasmia, Ruben Thorkildsen, Michael B. Clark, and Alex Turtletaub. Production companies involved with the film include Deetailfilm and Ape&Bjørn. On June 14, 2018, it was reported that the film had received a one-off contribution of 2 million Norwegian kroner (€211,000) towards its production costs from the Norwegian Film Institute.

Alongside the initial production announcement, it was confirmed that Jenny Slate, Alex Sharp, Zach Galifianakis, Gillian Anderson, Dan Puck and Jessica Hecht had been cast in the film.

Principal photography began on April 30, 2018, in New York City. Filming took place from July to September 2018 in Norway.

== Release ==
The film held its world premiere on January 26, 2019, at the Eccles Theater in Salt Lake City, Utah during the 2019 Sundance Film Festival. It was released on July 17, 2020, by Quiver Distribution. The film will be released in Germany on September 23, 2021, by W-film Distribution.

== Critical reception ==
On Rotten Tomatoes, The Sunlit Night holds an approval rating of 33% based on 58 reviews from critics with an average rating of 5/10. The site's critical consensus reads: "Jenny Slate remains as charming as ever, but her winsome performance isn't enough to overcome The Sunlit Night's grating tone and meandering plot."Metacritic, which uses a weighted average, assigned the film a score of 47 out of 100, based on 13 critics, indicating "mixed or average" reviews.
