= Osaka City Museum =

- 大阪市立博物館
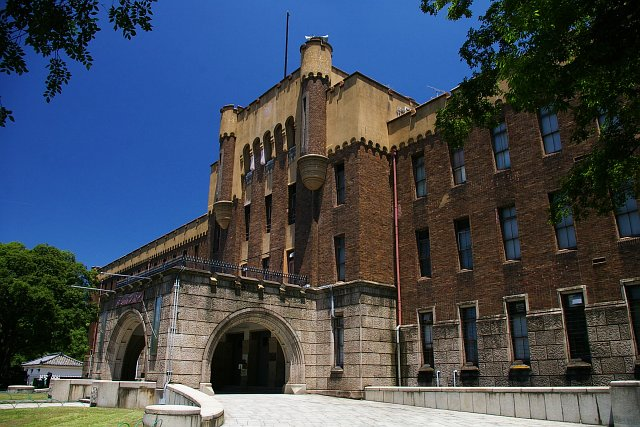
- Interactive map of the Osaka City Museum area

General information
- Location: 1-1 Ōsaka-jō, Chūō-ku, Ōsaka, Ōsaka Prefecture, Japan
- Coordinates: 34°41′09″N 135°31′36″E
- Opened: December 1960

Osaka City Museum (大阪市立博物館, Ōsaka Shiritsu Hakubutsukan) is a former museum dedicated to the history of Ōsaka, Japan. Located in the former headquarters of the 4th Division of the Imperial Japanese Army in Osaka Castle Park, the ground floor opened to the public in December 1960, with the special exhibition Momoyama Culture. After completion of the second stage of works, the entire museum opened in November 1962, with the special exhibition Famous Treasures of Osaka. In March 1989, the museum welcomed its 3,200,000th paying visitor. At the end of March 2001, Osaka City Museum permanently closed. Later the same year, the new Osaka Museum of History opened a short distance away.

The former headquarters building itself dates to 1931, the year reconstruction of the Osaka Castle tenshu in ferroconcrete was completed and Osaka Castle Park opened to the public. After World War II, the building was used as the headquarters in turn of the Osaka City Police and Osaka Prefectural Police. After remodelling, it served as Osaka City Museum. Transformed again, the former army headquarters building now functions as a dining and shopping space, under the moniker MIRAIZA Osaka-jo.

== See also ==
- Museums in Osaka
