= Osaka Museum of History =

- 大阪歴史博物館
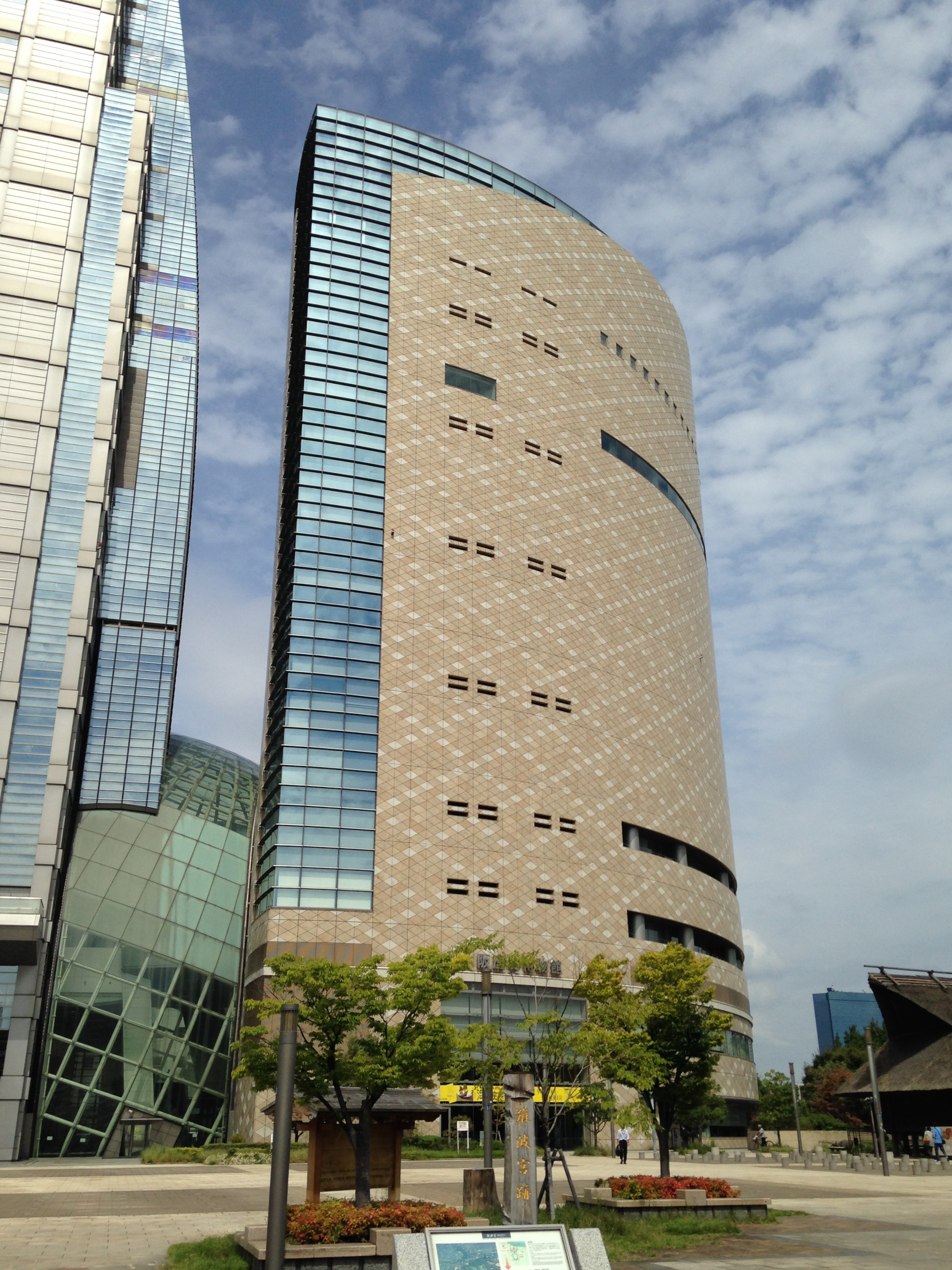

General information
- Location: 4-1-32 Ōtemae, Chūō-ku, Ōsaka, Ōsaka Prefecture, Japan
- Coordinates: 34°40′57″N 135°31′15″E
- Opened: 3 November 2001

Technical details
- Floor count: 4 (Floors 7–10)

Design and construction
- Architects: César Pelli & Associates, Nihon Sekkei

Website
- Official website

Osaka Museum of History (大阪歴史博物館, Ōsaka Rekishi Hakubutsukan) opened in Chūō-ku, Ōsaka, Japan, in 2001. The project architects were César Pelli & Associates and Nihon Sekkei. It is adjoined by an atrium to the NHK Osaka Broadcasting Center, which was designed by the same architects and built at the same time. The former Osaka City Museum closed earlier the same year. Over four floors, the displays tell the history of the city from the time of the Former Naniwa Palace, located in the area now occupied by the museum. Remains of a warehouse, walls, and water supply facilities for the palace are also on view in the basement. In 2005, the collection numbered some 100,000 objects. By 2016, it had grown to 138,595 objects, while a further 17,632 items were on deposit at the museum.

== See also ==
- Museums in Osaka
