= Nick Lashaway =

American actor (1988–2016)

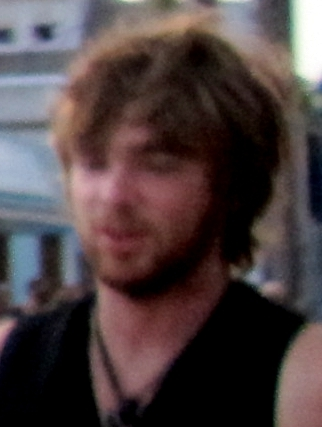
- Born: Nicholas Brian Lashaway; March 24, 1988; Washington, D.C., U.S.
- Died: May 8, 2016 (aged 28); Framingham, Massachusetts, U.S.
- Occupation: Actor
- Years active: 1998–2016
- Height: 1.83 m (6 ft 0 in)

Nicholas Brian Lashaway (March 24, 1988 – May 8, 2016) was an American actor.

He was best known for his roles on The X-Files, Girls, and The 40-Year-Old Virgin. He appeared in The Last Song opposite Miley Cyrus, portraying the leader of a gang of thugs who hustle money from beach carnival crowds through spectacular fire-juggling performances. He played Brandon O'Neil in Wes Craven's 2010 film My Soul to Take, opposite Max Thieriot. He also had a part in The Office, an American sitcom as a telemarketer.

== Death ==
Lashaway died in a three-car crash on May 8, 2016, in Framingham, Massachusetts.

== Filmography ==
Film
Year	Title	Role	Notes
1998	The X-Files	Young Fox Mulder	Supporting Role
2003	8 Simple Rules	Boy #1	1 Episode
2004	Life as We Know It	Christopher Flynn	3 Episodes
2005	The 40-Year-Old Virgin	Boy at Health Clinic	
2007	Humble Pie	Shawn	Supporting Role
2007	National Lampoon's Bag Boy	Ace	Supporting Role
2007	The Office	Telemarketer	1 Episode
2010	The Last Song	Marcus	Supporting Role
2010	Deal O'Neal	Tommy O'Neal	TV movie
2010	My Soul to Take	Brandon O' Neal	Supporting Role
2010	Little Murder	Tom Little	
2011	In Time	Ekman	Supporting Role
2013	Girls	Frank	
2016	Prayer Never Fails	Aiden Paul	His Last Appearance
