= The Angry Black Girl and Her Monster =

2023 black horror film

- Film poster
- Directed by: Bomani J. Story
- Written by: Bomani J. Story
- Based on: Frankenstein by Mary Shelley
- Produced by: Darren Brandl; Jack Davis; Bomani J. Story; Beth Tashijan
- Starring: Laya DeLeon Hayes; Denzel Whitaker; Chad Coleman
- Cinematography: Daphne Qin Wu
- Edited by: Annie De Brock
- Production company: Crypt TV
- Distributed by: RLJE Films
- Release dates: 11 March 2023 (South by Southwest); 9 June 2023
- Running time: 92 minutes
- Country: United States
- Language: English
- Box office: $123,107

The Angry Black Girl and Her Monster is a 2023 American science-fiction black horror film written and directed by Bomani J. Story in his directorial debut. It stars Laya DeLeon Hayes, Denzel Whitaker, Chad L. Coleman, Reilly Brooke Stith, Keith Sean Holliday, Amani Summer, and Edem Atsu-Swanzy.

Adapted from Mary Shelley's 1818 novel Frankenstein; or, The Modern Prometheus, the film follows a brilliant teenage girl named Vicaria (Hayes) who resurrects her brother from the dead, only for him to come back a vengeful monster.

The Angry Black Girl and Her Monster premiered at the South by Southwest film festival on March 11, 2023. The film was released in select US theaters on June 9, 2023, and on streaming on June 23, 2023. At the 55th NAACP Image Awards, the film was nominated for Outstanding Independent Motion Picture while Hayes was nominated for Outstanding Breakthrough Performance in a Motion Picture.

== Plot ==
The world of seventeen year-old genius Vicaria (Hayes) is rife with violence, police brutality, and drug abuse. After losing her mother, and later her brother to violence, Vicaria vows to stop the violence bringing her family back to life. She successfully resurrects her brother, but it soon becomes apparent that she has brought back a monster that is hungry for vengeance.

== Cast ==
- Laya DeLeon Hayes as Vicaria
- Denzel Whitaker as Kango
- Chad L. Coleman as Donald
- Reilly Brooke Stith as Aisha
- Keith Sean Holliday as Jamaal
- Amani Summer as Jada
- Edem Atsu-Swanzy as Chris and the Creature

== Production ==
=== Development ===
In an interview with The Austin Chronicle, Story said the idea for the film came to him in 2008, and he had been "holding onto" the original script since 2018. As the script was passed around, it was continuously rejected and "spent a lot of time in purgatory". During the 2020 coronavirus pandemic, the project caught the interest of horror media company Crypt TV.

The Angry Black Girl and Her Monster was officially announced on May 4, 2022, via Deadline Hollywood, and revealed the involvement of Rock Steady Row's Bomani J. Story. Crypt TV's Jack Davis and Darren Brandl would produce along with Story, and Jeremy Elliott and Jasmine Johnson would serve as Crypt TV's executive producers. Laya DeLeon Hayes of The Equalizer would star as the female lead Vicaria, and Denzel Whitaker of Black Panther was set to star alongside her. The film is Crypt TV's first English-language feature film, with the company releasing the Hindi-language feature film Chhorii in 2021.

Filming began in June 2022, and wrapped later that July.

=== Writing ===
The Angry Black Girl and Her Monster is inspired by Mary Shelley's 1818 novel Frankenstein; or The Modern Prometheus, and is both written and directed by Bomani J. Story, best known for his work on the 2018 film Rock Steady Row. In an interview with Deadline, Story reminisced about watching monster movies with his older sister, which led to his dream of adapting Frankenstein: "We rarely, if ever, saw ones that tackled issues that were important to us, with people who looked like us. It has been a dream of mine to bring an adaptation of Frankenstein to film through the black lens with a lead character as smart as my sister.”

In an interview with MovieWeb, Story said that he had first read Frankenstein in high school, and he was moved by the potency of its themes, particularly by the character of Victor Frankenstein and the dehumanization of his creation. "One of the things about Victor that people kind of skip over, is at the very beginning of his genesis," Story said. "He loses his mom and all these people at a very young age, and with the destruction of his family, I was just like — this just makes complete sense to me, because of these systemic pressures that are twisting my community in so many different ways, just like the story. It just made complete sense for it to kind of be told, or at least inspired by and reformatted, for our times, for today."

=== Casting ===
On May 4, 2022, it was announced that Laya DeLeon Hayes was cast as protagonist Vicaria, and Denzel Whitaker was cast in the role of Kango. A press release on February 1, 2023, revealed the rest of the cast; Chad Coleman, Reilly Brooke Stith, Keith Sean Holliday, Amani Summer, and Edem Atsu-Swanzy. In an interview with MovieWeb, Hayes admitted that she had never seen nor read Frankenstein before hearing about Story's film, but was fascinated by the thought of a black female lead helping to adapt it for the modern era.

== Release ==
On February 1, 2023, it was announced that the film would be released at the South by Southwest film festival, which would take place later that March. On February 22, 2023, it was announced that RLJE Films had bought the film ahead of its SXSW premiere date and would release the film theatrically late that summer. After the film's theatrical run, it will be released on the streaming sites Shudder and ALLBLK.

Angry Black Girl also made a premiere at the Overlook Film Festival on March 30, 2023.

The film had a limited theatrical run on June 9, 2023. It was released through on-demand and streaming on June 23, 2023.

== Reception ==
=== Critical response ===
On the review aggregator website Rotten Tomatoes, the film has a score of 85% based on 59 reviews, with an average rating of 7.1/10. The website's consensus reads, "Injecting a classic story with fresh innovation and social relevance, The Angry Black Girl and Her Monster is a thrillingly assured feature debut for writer-director Bomani J. Story." Metacritic, which uses a weighted average, assigned the film a score of 62 out of 100, based on eight critics, indicating "generally favorable" reviews. Megan Navarro of Bloody Disgusting called the film a "righteous reinterpretation" of Mary Shelley's novel, citing that the film's strength lies in the humanity of its characters and metaphors rather than in typical horror:

"The Angry Black Girl and Her Monster runs a classic literary horror story through a modern urban lens, connecting the mad scientist with a young woman forced to fix society’s most elusive problems...While less successful as a straightforward horror movie, Story’s empathetic approach combined with Hayes’s complex and nuanced portrayal makes for a profoundly human story that evokes respect and hope."

Dex Wesley Parra of The Austin Chronicle likewise praised Story's directorial work, as well as the film's focus on community rather than solely being a horror film: "(The film) speaks to a new wave of interest in material that blends genre convention with social commentary. Make no mistake, Angry Black Girl oozes, bleeds, and frightens...The film is also grounded as a family drama, a coming-of-age narrative, and a community tale of mourning and healing." In a June 2023 review of the film, entertainment news website ScreenRant rated the film a 3.5 out of 5, noting that while the film itself was not perfect, its intentions were "perfectly executed". The site praised Story's involvement, the film's casting, and the story's focus on the lives of black Americans:

"Story's script is a thing of pure beauty in terms of depicting Black life. Even in 2023, it's rare to see an all-Black cast. The film is also not about Black people in the projects or an excuse to abuse them onscreen. The film simply centers Black characters without ever hitting the audience over the head with ham-fisted ideas on race... The Angry Black Girl and Her Monster is marvelous, tragic, terrifying, and certainly worth your time."
