= Owen Campbell =

Owen Campbell may refer to:

- Owen Campbell (musician) (born 1987), Australian blues singer-songwriter and guitarist
- Owen Campbell (rugby league) (1918–1993), Australian rugby league player
- Owen Campbell (actor) (born 1995), American actor
