= Characters of the Tekken series =

Characters from Tekken 7 depicted in promotional artwork

Bandai Namco Entertainment's Tekken media franchise is known for its varied cast of characters hailing from various nationalities, all coming together to compete in the King of Iron Fist tournament. In addition to the human characters, Tekken also features non-human characters for comic relief, such as the bear Kuma, his love interest Panda, the boxing kangaroo Roger, and the dinosaur Alex. Certain characters like Jin Kazama, Kazuya Mishima, Lee Chaolan, and Jun Kazama have their own alternative versions. Each character has their own goals for participating in the tournament.

== Character appearances ==
Only four characters have been playable in all eight main Tekken games to date. Three were featured at launch: Nina Williams, Paul Phoenix and Yoshimitsu. But Paul is the only one of the three who is part of the character roster at launch. In the original Tekken 7 (vanilla arcade version), Yoshimitsu was added via an update, while Nina is completely absent and was only added in the updated version Fated Retribution. The other character was Heihachi Mishima, who became playable but outside the main roster as paid downloadable content in Tekken 8. Of the four, only Nina and Paul are playable in all the side games as well. King and Kuma (not including the original vanilla Tekken 7 version) have also been playable in all the main games (and main spin-off games for King only), but as two different characters. Four characters, Anna Williams, Kazuya Mishima, Lee Chaolan and Marshall Law, would come close, having been playable in seven main games, but Marshall Law and Kazuya are also in the original Tekken 7, while Lee was only added in the update version and Anna via paid DLC, also in Tekken 8. The JACK series have also been playable in seven main games in different iterations.

=== Table ===
Comparison table

Yes = Playable by default.

Yes = Playable via update or unlockable.

Costume / Costume = Playable, whether by default, unlockable, or via update, but as a palette swap or in-battle transformation of another character instead of a standalone character.

DLC = Paid downloadable content (except TTT2).

Guest = Third-party character.

NPC = Non-playable character.

Cameo = Cameo appearance.

? = To be confirmed.

No = Not included.

+ = Including the update games.

Note: The characters are listed in the table as the speaker announces them on the character selection screen, starting from Tekken Tag Tournament onwards.

Character	TK	TK2	TK3	TCC	TTT	TK4	TK5 +	TK6 +	TTT2	TR	TK7 +	TM	TK8	Total
Akuma	No	No	No	No	No	No	No	No	No	No	Guest^{5}	Guest	No	2
Alex	No	Yes	No	No	Yes	No	No	No	Yes	No	No	Yes	No	4
Alisa Bosconovitch	No	No	No	No	No	No	No	Yes^{3}	Yes	Yes	Yes	No	Yes	5
Ancient Ogre	No	No	Yes	Yes	Yes	Cameo	No	No	DLC	No	No	Cameo	Cameo	7
Angel	No	Yes	No	No	Yes	No	No	No	DLC	No	No	No	No	3
Angel Jin	No	No	No	No	No	No	No	No	No	No	No	No	NPC^{11}	1
Anna Williams	Yes	Yes	Yes	Yes	Yes	No	Yes	Yes	Yes	No	DLC^{5}	Yes	DLC	11
Armor King I/II	Yes^{9}	Yes^{9}	Cameo^{9}	No	Yes^{9}	Cameo^{9}	Yes^{2} ^{10}	Yes^{10} ^{14}	Yes^{10}	Yes^{10}	DLC^{5} ^{10}	No	DLC^{10}	11
Asuka Kazama	No	No	No	No	No	No	Yes	Yes	Yes	Yes	Yes	Yes	Yes	7
Azazel	No	No	No	No	No	No	No	NPC	No	No	Cameo^{5}	No	NPC	3
Azucena	No	No	No	No	No	No	No	No	No	No	No	No	Yes	1
Baek Doo San	No	Yes	No	No	Yes	No	Yes	Yes	Yes	No	No	No	No	5
Bob	No	No	No	No	No	No	No	Yes	Yes	Yes	Yes^{5}	Yes	DLC	6
Bruce Irvin	No	Yes	No	No	Yes	No	Yes	Yes	Yes	No	No	Yes	No	6
Bryan Fury	No	No	Yes	Yes	Yes	Yes	Yes	Yes	Yes	Yes	Yes	Yes	Yes	11
Christie Monteiro	No	No	No	No	No	Yes	Yes	Yes	Yes	Yes	Cameo	Yes	No	7
Claudio Serafino	No	No	No	No	No	No	No	No	No	No	Yes	No	Yes	2
Clive Rosfield	No	No	No	No	No	No	No	No	No	No	No	No	DLC/Guest	1
Combot	No	No	No	No	No	Yes	No	No	Yes	No	Cameo^{5}	No	No	3
Craig Marduk	No	No	No	No	No	Yes	Yes	Yes	Yes	No	DLC^{5}	Yes	No	6
Crow	No	No	NPC	Yes	Cameo	No	No	No	NPC	No	No	No	No	4
Devil Jin	No	No	Cameo	No	No	Cameo	Yes	Yes	Yes	Yes	Yes	No	Yes	8
Devil Kazumi	No	No	No	No	No	No	No	No	No	No	NPC	No	No	1
Devil Kazuya	Costume	Yes	No	No	Yes	Cameo	No	No	Costume	Costume	Costume	No	Costume	8
Dr. Bosconovitch	No	Cameo	Yes	Yes	Cameo	Cameo	Cameo	Cameo	DLC	No	No	No	No	8
Eddy Gordo	No	No	Yes	Yes	Yes	Yes	Yes	Yes	Yes	No	Yes^{5}	No	DLC	9
Eliza	No	No	No	No	No	No	No	No	No	Yes	DLC^{5}	Yes	No	3
Fahkumram	No	No	No	No	No	No	No	No	No	No	DLC^{5}	No	DLC	2
Feng Wei	No	No	No	No	No	No	Yes	Yes	Yes	Yes	Yes	Yes	Yes	7
Forest Law	Cameo	No	Yes	Yes	Yes	No	No	No	Yes	No	No	No	No	5
Ganryu	Yes	Yes	No	No	Yes	No	Yes	Yes	Yes	No	DLC^{5}	No	No	7
Geese Howard	No	No	No	No	No	No	No	No	No	No	DLC/Guest^{5}	No	No	1
Gigas	No	No	No	No	No	No	No	No	No	No	Yes	No	No	1
Gon	No	No	Guest	No	No	No	No	No	No	No	No	No	No	1
GUN JACK (JACK-3)	No	No	Yes	Yes	Yes	No	NPC^{7}	No	No	No	No	No	No	4
Halloween Dragunov	No	No	No	No	No	No	No	No	No	No	No	Yes	No	1
Heihachi Mishima	Yes	Yes	Yes	Yes	Yes	Yes	Yes	Yes	Yes	NPC	Yes	No	DLC	12
Hwoarang	No	No	Yes	Yes^{12}	Yes	Yes	Yes	Yes	Yes	Yes	Yes	No	Yes	10
Isaak	No	No	No	No	No	No	No	No	No	No	No	Yes	No	1
JACK	Yes	No	No	No	No	No	No	No	No	No	No	No	No	1
JACK-2	No	Yes	Costume	No	Yes	No	No	No	No	No	No	No	No	3
JACK-5	No	No	No	No	No	No	Yes	No	No	No	No	No	No	1
JACK-6	No	No	No	No	No	No	No	Yes	Yes	Yes	NPC^{8}	No	No	4
JACK-7	No	No	No	No	No	No	No	No	No	No	Yes	No	Costume	2
JACK-8	No	No	No	No	No	No	No	No	No	No	No	No	Yes	1
Jaycee	No	No	No	No	No	No	No	No	Yes	Yes	No	No	No	2
Jin Kazama	No	No	Yes	Yes	Yes	Yes	Yes	Yes	Yes	Yes	Yes	Yes	Yes	11
Jinpachi Mishima	No	No	No	No	No	No	Yes^{1}	Cameo	Yes	NPC	Cameo	No	No	5
Josie Rizal	No	No	No	No	No	No	No	No	No	No	Yes	No	No	1
Julia Chang	No	No	Yes	Yes	Yes	Yes	Yes	Yes	Costume	No	DLC^{5}	No	No	8
Jun Kazama	No	Yes	Cameo	No	Yes	Cameo	No	No	Yes	Yes	No	No	Yes	7
Katarina Alves	No	No	No	No	No	No	No	No	No	No	Yes	Yes	No	2
Kazumi Mishima	No	No	No	No	No	No	No	No	No	No	Yes	No	No	1
Kazuya Mishima	Yes	Yes	Cameo	No	Yes	Yes	Yes	Yes	Yes	Yes	Yes	Yes	Yes	12
Kid Kazuya	No	No	No	No	No	No	No	No	No	No	Yes^{5} ^{6} ^{8}	No	No	1
King I/II	Yes^{9}	Yes^{9}	Yes^{10}	Yes^{10}	Yes^{10}	Yes^{10}	Yes^{10}	Yes^{10}	Yes^{10}	Yes^{10}	Yes^{10}	Yes^{10}	Yes^{10}	13
Kinjin	No	No	No	No	No	No	No	No	No	NPC	Cameo	No	Cameo	3
Kuma I/II	Yes^{9}	Yes^{9}	Yes^{10}	Yes^{10}	Yes^{10}	Yes^{10}	Yes^{10}	Yes^{10}	Yes^{10}	Yes^{10}	Yes^{5} ^{10}	No	Yes^{10}	12
Kunimitsu I	Yes	Yes	No	No	Yes	No	No	No	DLC	Yes	Cameo^{5}	No	Cameo	7
Kunimitsu II	No	No	No	No	No	No	No	No	No	No	DLC^{5}	No	DLC	2
Lars Alexandersson	No	No	No	No	No	No	No	Yes^{3}	Yes	Yes	Yes	No	Yes	5
Lee Chaolan	Yes	Yes	No	No	Yes	Yes	Yes	Yes	Yes	Yes	Yes^{5}	Yes	Yes	11
Lei Wulong	No	Yes	Yes	Yes	Yes	Yes	Yes	Yes	Yes	No	DLC^{5}	No	No	9
Leo	No	No	No	No	No	No	No	Yes	Yes	Yes	Yes	Yes	Yes	6
Leroy Smith	No	No	No	No	No	No	No	No	No	No	DLC^{5}	No	Yes	2
Lidia Sobieska	No	No	No	No	No	No	No	No	No	No	DLC^{5}	No	DLC	2
Lili	No	No	No	No	No	No	Yes^{2}	Yes	Yes	Yes	Yes	Yes	Yes	7
Ling Xiaoyu	No	No	Yes	Yes	Yes	Yes	Yes	Yes	Yes	Yes	Yes	Yes	Yes	11
Lucky Chloe	No	No	No	No	No	No	No	No	No	No	Yes	No	No	1
Marshall Law	Yes	Yes	Cameo	No	No	Yes	Yes	Yes	Yes	Yes	Yes	Yes	Yes	11
Master Raven	No	No	No	No	No	No	No	No	No	No	Yes^{5}	No	No	1
Miary Zo	No	No	No	No	No	No	No	No	No	No	No	No	DLC	1
Michelle Chang	Yes	Yes	Cameo	No	Yes	No	No	No	DLC	No	No	No	No	5
Miguel	No	No	No	No	No	No	No	Yes	Yes	Yes	Yes^{5}	Yes	No	5
Miharu Hirano	No	No	No	No	No	Yes	No	No	DLC	No	No	No	No	2
Mokujin	No	No	Yes	Yes	Yes	No	Yes	Yes	Yes	NPC	Cameo	NPC	Cameo	10
NANCY-MI847J	No	No	No	No	No	No	No	NPC^{4}	No	No	Cameo^{5}	No	No	2
Negan	No	No	No	No	No	No	No	No	No	No	DLC/Guest^{5} ^{8}	No	No	1
Nina Williams	Yes	Yes	Yes	Yes	Yes	Yes	Yes	Yes	Yes	Yes	Yes^{5}	Yes	Yes	13
Noctis Lucis Caelum	No	No	No	No	No	No	No	No	No	No	DLC/Guest^{5}	No	No	1
Panda	No	No	Yes	Yes	Yes	Yes	Yes	Yes	Yes	No	Yes^{5}	Yes	Yes	10
Paul Phoenix	Yes	Yes	Yes	Yes	Yes	Yes	Yes	Yes	Yes	Yes	Yes	Yes	Yes	13
Prototype Jack	Yes	Yes	No	No	Yes	No	No	No	Yes	No	No	No	No	4
Raven	No	No	No	No	No	No	Yes	Yes	Yes	No	Cameo	No	Yes	5
Reina	No	No	No	No	No	No	No	No	No	No	No	No	Yes	1
Revenant	No	No	No	No	No	No	No	No	No	No	No	NPC	No	1
Rodeo	No	No	No	No	No	No	No	No	No	No	No	Yes	No	1
Roger	No	Yes	No	No	Yes	No	Cameo	Cameo	Cameo	No	No	No	Cameo	6
Roger Jr.	No	No	No	No	No	No	Yes	Yes	Yes	No	No	No	DLC	4
Ruby	No	No	No	No	No	No	No	No	No	No	No	Yes	No	1
Sebastian	No	No	No	No	No	No	Cameo^{2}	Cameo	DLC	No	No	No	No	3
Sergei Dragunov	No	No	No	No	No	No	Yes^{2}	Yes	Yes	Yes	Yes	Yes	Yes	7
Shaheen	No	No	No	No	No	No	No	No	No	No	Yes	Yes	Yes	3
Slim Bob	No	No	No	No	No	No	No	Cameo	DLC	No	No	No	No	2
Steve Fox	No	No	No	No	No	Yes	Yes	Yes	Yes	Yes	Yes	Yes	Yes	8
Summer Asuka	No	No	No	No	No	No	No	No	No	No	No	Yes	No	1
Summer Bob	No	No	No	No	No	No	No	No	No	No	No	Yes	No	1
Summer Lili	No	No	No	No	No	No	No	No	No	No	No	Yes	No	1
Summer Nina	No	No	No	No	No	No	No	No	No	No	No	Yes	No	1
Super Combot DX	No	No	No	No	No	No	No	No	Yes^{13}	No	No	No	No	1
Tetsujin	No	No	No	No	Yes	No	No	No	No	NPC	No	NPC	Cameo	4
Tiger Jackson	No	No	Yes	Cameo	Yes	No	Cameo^{2}	No	Yes	No	No	No	No	5
Tiger Miyagi	No	No	No	No	No	No	No	No	No	No	No	Yes	No	1
True Ogre	No	No	Yes	NPC	Yes	No	NPC^{7}	No	Yes	NPC	No	No	No	6
Unknown	No	No	No	No	Yes	No	No	No	DLC	No	No	No	No	2
Victor Chevalier	No	No	No	No	No	No	No	No	No	No	No	No	Yes	1
Violet	No	No	No	No	No	Yes	Cameo	No	DLC	No	Yes^{5}	No	No	4
Wang Jinrei	Yes	Yes	No	No	Yes	No	Yes	Yes	Yes	No	Cameo	No	No	7
Yoshimitsu	Yes	Yes	Yes	Yes	Yes	Yes	Yes	Yes	Yes	No	Yes	No	Yes	11
Yue	No	No	No	No	No	No	No	No	No	No	No	Yes	No	1
Yujiro Hanma	No	No	No	No	No	No	No	No	No	No	No	No	DLC/Guest	1
Zafina	No	No	No	No	No	No	No	Yes	Yes	No	DLC^{5}	No	Yes	4
Total (Playable characters)	18	25	24	21	39	23	36	42	62	30	54	37	47	
Total (Character roster)	17	25	23	21	39	23	32; 36 ^{(DR)}	39; 41 ^{(BR)}	59 + 1	29 + 1	27 + 1; 52 + 1 ^{(FR)}	37	44 + 1	

Notes:
+ 1 in the >Total (Character roster)"< row means that the +1 Devil Kazuya is meant.
Not including arcade history mode of Tekken 5 and gallery mode of Tekken 7 and Tekken 8.
^1NPC in Tekken 5 and Tekken 5: DR (PSP, arcade, and online only)/Unlockable in Tekken 5:DR (PS3 and offline only)
^2Only in Tekken 5: DR.
^3Only in Tekken 6: BR (arcade and console).
^4Playable in a campaign level.
^5Only in Tekken 7: FR (arcade and console)/Round 2.
^6Only playable in story mode for a short amount of time in the console version.
^7Only in Devil Within mode.
^8Not playable or available in Round 2.
^9As King I/Armor King I/Kuma I.
^10As King II/Armor King II/Kuma II.
^11Only playable in story mode in The Dark Awakens.
^12Unlockable if not selected in Adventure Mode.
^13Only playable in Fight Lab mode for the prologue.
^14Armor King I also appears as a cameo.

== Introduced in Tekken ==
=== Armor King I/II ===
- Nationality: Unknown (both)
- Fighting style: Pro-Wrestling (US style, Armor King I) / Pro-Wrestling (JP style, Armor King II)

Armor King (アーマー・キング, Āmā Kingu) is a professional wrestler and was a rival of King when the latter was still an inexperienced wrestler. He suffered eye damage in a fight with King, but when he later found King distraught and drunk in an alleyway, Armor King convinced him to get back into fighting and enter the second King of Iron Fist tournament. After King is killed by Ogre, Armor King trains a new fighter who sports a jaguar mask similar to that of King's. Armor King is not selectable in Tekken 4, as he is beaten to death in a bar fight instigated by Australian brawler Craig Marduk, who then steals his mask and mockingly wears it in the tournament, provoking Armor King's protege King into entering the competition to seek revenge. Marduk is then attacked in Tekken 5 by what is believed to be Armor King, but his assailant is revealed in Tekken 6 as the original Armor King's younger brother. After recovering from a brutal beating where he and Marduk knocked out each other and brought to hospital by King, the younger Armor King accepts Marduk's challenge for a retirement match arranged by King in Tekken 7.

Others appearances (Armor King II):

- Tekken 3D: Prime Edition

=== Ganryu ===
- Nationality: (Japan) Japanese
- Fighting style: Sumo
- Voiced by:
  Banjō Ginga (Tekken)
  Takashi Nagasako (TK2-Tekken Tag Tournament; Tekken: The Motion Picture (Japanese))
  Lowell B. Bartholomee (Tekken: The Motion Picture (English))
  Hidenari Ugaki (TK5-present; Tekken: Bloodline (Japanese))
  Earl Baylon (Tekken: Bloodline (English))

Ganryu (Japanese: 巌竜, Hepburn: Ganryū) is a Japanese sumo wrestler who is barred from the sport for infractions such as firebreathing and taunting his opponents. This rejection, coupled with his mounting gambling debts, steers him into a life of crime. Heihachi Mishima hires him as a henchman for the first King of Iron Fist tournament, in which Ganryu loses to Yoshimitsu, who then drains Ganryu's remaining finances and leaves him broke. Kazuya Mishima pays him handsomely for his services in his Mishima Zaibatsu corporation. Ganryu participates in the second tournament as Kazuya's bodyguard, but he also wishes to build his own sumo ring to impress his secret crush, Michelle Chang, but instead, she defeats him in battle and Ganryu returns to Japan. Two decades after the events of Tekken 2, Ganryu opens a sumo stable and trains other wrestlers. However, after seeing Michelle's daughter Julia on television fighting in the fourth tournament, he enters the fifth in hopes of wooing Julia if he is able to recover her lost "Forest Rejuvenation Data" that he eventually finds inside the Mishima Zaibatsu's laboratory, but Julia receives the information and flees before Ganryu can propose marriage. Now faced with a failing restaurant he had opened afterward in Hawaii, Ganryu enters the tournament again in Tekken 6 in attempt to advertise the restaurant and bring in revenue. Unfortunately, Ganryu accidentally donated all his restaurant earnings to Julia's reforestation campaign. In order to fix his financial problems, Ganryu decided to enter the seventh tournament.

Ganryu's occupations have varied in alternate Tekken media; in the animated film Tekken: The Motion Picture, he is Lee Chaolan's bodyguard, and in Tekken: Blood Vengeance, he is a PE teacher at the Mishima Polytechnic School.

GameSpy named Ganryu as one of their "25 Extremely Rough Brawlers" in video gaming: "Ganryu is more of a tragic character as his unrequited love for fellow fighter Julia fuels his brutality." In 2011, Computer and Video Games deemed Ganryu one of the series' "worst ever characters": "If losing some weight and not wearing a massive nappy all the time isn't the first thing you do to attract someone whose mother you've already failed to hit on, then you're doing something terribly, horribly wrong."

Others appearances:

- Tekken 3D: Prime Edition

=== JACK (series)/Prototype Jack ===
- Nationality: (Russia) Russian, but not a citizen (JACK, JACK-2, P. Jack, and JACK-X only) / Unknown (other JACKs)
- Fighting style: Sheer force
- Voiced by:
  Banjō Ginga (Tekken - Tekken 5)
  Akio Ōtsuka (Tekken: The Motion Picture (Japanese)) (JACK-2)
  Mark O'Brien (Tekken: The Motion Picture (English)) (JACK-2)
  Jordan Byrne (Street Fighter X Tekken (English)) (JACK-X)
  Kenichirou Matsuda (Street Fighter X Tekken (Japanese)) (JACK-X)

The various JACK models were originally created by the Mishima Zaibatsu and G Corporation for different purposes:

- JACK (introduced in Tekken) is the original model, created by Heihachi's Mishima Zaibatsu in order to counter a coup from Kazuya Mishima in the King of Iron Fist Tournament. In-game, the player is one of these machines.
- JACK-2 (introduced in Tekken 2) is a direct upgrade of the JACK model, also created by the Mishima Zaibatsu. Once a JACK-2 witnesses a young girl named Jane lose her mother during a battle, he takes it upon himself to look after her, until he is destroyed by Dr. Abel. JACK-2 also appears in Tekken 3 as a palette swap of GUN JACK.
- Prototype Jack (or P. Jack) (introduced in Tekken) is a prototype created to combat both JACK and JACK-2. After the first King of Iron Fist Tournament, the remains of Prototype Jack are almost destroyed by JACK's combat abilities. His body is later remodeled by Dr. Bosconovitch, while also gaining flight and goes on to combat JACK-2. P. Jack is seemingly destroyed by JACK-2 in the second tournament. This is the only JACK to appear in more than three games, appearing in the original Tekken, Tekken 2, Tekken Tag Tournament, and the console version of Tekken Tag Tournament 2.
- Gun JACK (also known as "JACK-3") (introduced in Tekken 3) is a more advanced prototype, created by Jane in an attempt to revive her friend, JACK-2. She is successful in implanting her JACK-2's memories, including an energy shield inside him, and P. Jack’s flight abilities. However, as GUN JACK's energy shield ran out of power, it is destroyed by gunfire by the Tekken Force when he and Jane attempt to break into the Mishima Zaibatsu labs. G Corporation rescues her in time and retrieves GUN JACK's body as well. This is the only JACK that is associate to Jane and not mass-produced.
- JACK-4 (introduced in Tekken 5) is an upgrade of Gun JACK, created by G Corporation and the only one in the Jack series that is non-playable. Like P. Jack, this model has a separate personality. Unlike other models in the JACK series, this one is mass-produced to serve as the foot soldiers of the G Corporation. While these never participate in any tournament, they are sent by G Corporation's Nebraska branch to kill Kazuya Mishima after they no longer need him, and the subsequent battle in Hon-Maru almost results in the death of Heihachi Mishima. However, Heihachi survived and blasted far away from Hon-Maru, until he recovered from a comatose for days when the fifth tournament was announced. These specific models have a self-destruct device embedded in them, indicated when one of them peels away its face to reveal a countdown. They also appear as unplayable enemies in a Tekken 5 flashback chapter of Tekken 7.
- JACK-5 (introduced in Tekken 5) is an upgrade of JACK-4, created by Jane during her first time at G Corporation to participate in the King of Iron Fist Tournament 5. Currently upgraded into JACK-6 after Kazuya's take over.
- JACK-6 (introduced in Tekken 6) is an upgrade of JACK-5, upgraded from JACK-5 with same model of previous version, with a minor body part upgrade by G Corporation with the mission of destroying the Mishima Zaibatsu in the King of Iron Fist Tournament 6. As of Tekken 7, starting from JACK-6, a previous JACK model which was playable in a previous tournament has been mass-produced in a later tournament, where the later JACK model serves as a main playable model in a corresponding number within the tournament series is deployed for combat experimental purposes.
- JACK-X (introduced in Street Fighter X Tekken) and his official tag partner, Bryan Fury, were released on July 31, 2012, as downloadable content. Unlike Jack-5 – 6, this Jack can talk, although it was revealed to be in prototype stage between both of these main JACK series.
- JACK-7 (introduced in Tekken 7) is an upgraded version of JACK-6. It finally has a proper model modification since it was ended with JACK-5, albeit recolored from JACK-6. JACK-7 also appears in Tekken 8 as a palette swap of JACK-8.
- JACK-8 (introduced in Tekken 8) is an upgraded version of JACK-7. Besides receiving further upgrades based on the previous JACK's above, he is now equipped with both visor and summonable giant flying drill/laser cannon-hybrid weapon, and he can now utilize projectile-based rocket punches, similar to Alisa Bosconovitch's. It was created as an anti-suppression weapon against G Corporation's enemies.

The JACK series robots also appear in Tekken Tag Tournament (JACK-2, GUN JACK, and Prototype Jack) and Tekken Tag Tournament 2 (JACK-6 and Prototype Jack). The player's JACK character (barring original JACK, Prototype Jack, Jack-2, JACK-X and JACK-4) in most series belongs to Jane.

Others appearances:

- Tekken Advance - GUN JACK
- Tekken 3D: Prime Edition - JACK-6
- Street Fighter X Tekken (paid DLC, except in PlayStation Vita) - JACK-X
- Galaga: TEKKEN Edition (unplayable enemy) - JACK-6

=== Kuma I/II ===
- Nationality: (Japan) Japanese, but not a citizen (both)
- Fighting style: Kuma Shinken (later adopts Heihachi's Shorin-ryu-styled Mishima Fighting Karate as of TK8)
- Voiced by: Katsuhiro Harada (Hyperdimension Neptunia Victory) (Kuma II)

Kuma I

The first Kuma was once an abandoned bear cub in the forests of the Mishima estate. Heihachi Mishima found Kuma and took him in as his pet. Despite Kuma's unflinching loyalty to his master, Kuma often left Heihachi's side to sleep, even during the summer. This lazy approach means that Kuma's fighting style has never really matured and is very disjointed. This was demonstrated in the first King of Iron Fist Tournament, where Kuma was easily defeated by Paul Phoenix. Kuma was very impressed with Paul's fighting prowess, as he had thought that the only strong human was Heihachi. Heihachi was also defeated in the last tournament (by Kazuya Mishima), and so he and Kuma retreated to a mountain dojo to re-train. Kuma traveled to the King of Iron Fist Tournament 2 with his master, vowing to destroy Paul Phoenix this time, and to eat anyone who got in his way. Kuma was immediately defeated by Paul Phoenix again.

Kuma II

Just after the second tournament Kuma died of old age, Heihachi trains a replacement, also named Kuma, Just like his father, the second Kuma is Heihachi Mishima's pet and bodyguard. Kuma is in love with the panda bear Panda, but she neither feels the same nor has any interest in him. It is noted that although she does not love him, she does occasionally give him a thought - that Kuma II is smarter than his father, and a good bodyguard for Heihachi. One day, when Kuma was absorbed in watching TV, he suddenly went wild at the sight of a martial artist with a scarlet go-gi - it was Paul Phoenix. Kuma has trained since that day to defeat Paul in the King of Iron Fist Tournament 3. He does not think anything of Ogre, who is the God of Fighting; only of defeating Paul. However, during the third tournament Kuma was once again easily defeated by Paul. Kuma would finally accomplish his goal of defeating Paul in the King of Iron Fist Tournament 4. However, Kuma's happiness was brought to an abrupt end with the death of his master Heihachi. Kuma lived in sorrow over Heihachi's presumed death, but on seeing the uncertainty surrounding the Mishima Zaibatsu, Kuma realized that saving it would be the ultimate display of loyalty to his presumed deceased master. However, the chaos at Mishima Zaibatsu had already subsided when Kuma arrived, and he was thrown out of the building by security. Kuma had no choice but to return to the mountains.

When the Mishima Zaibatsu announced the King of Iron Fist Tournament 5, Kuma decided he would enter the tournament and take back the Mishima Zaibatsu. During the fifth tournament Kuma fought his old enemy Paul Phoenix but just barely lost to him. Sometime after the King of Iron Fist Tournament 5 and the death of his master Heihachi Mishima, Kuma was convinced that he was the only one who could save the Mishima Zaibatsu. He set out to the Mishima Zaibatsu headquarters with resolve.

Waiting for him there was the new leader of the Zaibatsu, Jin Kazama. Easily defeated by Jin, Kuma was dumped out of a helicopter into the Hokkaido wilderness. Despite that, Kuma survived, traversed the vast forests, and entered the King of Iron Fist Tournament 6, determined to defeat Jin and take his place as the rightful successor of the Mishima Zaibatsu.

Following Heihachi's surprising return as a Mishima Zaibatsu leader since Jin's disappearance, Kuma was found by his master's Tekken Force army, and learned that his master promotes him to lead his own Tekken Force unit. Due to being busy with important tasks as a leader of his Tekken Force unit, Kuma forfeit his spot in the King of Iron Fist Tournament 7 where he supposedly would have fought his old enemy Paul again. Instead, Paul's opponent is Kuma's crush, Panda (unbeknownst to Kuma himself). Kuma's last known location during the tournament was the Philippines, where he and his unit provides supplies for the Filipino survivors of a typhoon disaster. After earning the local country's trust, Kuma became the final opponent for the Zaibatsu's employment exam. Many young participants either quit or lost to Kuma during the exam: only one participant, a typhoon survivor named Josie Rizal, succeeded - despite Kuma's misgivings about her crybaby attitude.

Unfortunately, following the presumed death of Heihachi at the hands of Kazuya during the seventh tournament, Kuma begins to adopt Heihachi's fighting style and dons his signature gi, with a headband of matching red color as Heihachi's karate belt. Before G Corporation fully takes over Mishima Zaibatsu and its assets, Kuma rescues one of the researchers from Mishima Heavy Industries in time, who eventually provides him aimable salmon-like rocket explosives during The King of Iron Fist Tournament 8, and one of the remnants bribed the Thailand government to ensure Kuma represent the Southeast/Oceanian finalist instead of its fighter, Fahkumram. Although Kuma and most public are unaware of Heihachi's disappearance, with Kuma is one of the few who doubt his master's survival. While Heihachi is hidden somehow, Kuma sides with Jin against Kazuya. During the war, Kuma sneakily attempts to take Paul and Marshall out, but instead accidentally takes a hit by a rocket meant to hit both men and thereby saves them, to Kuma's dismay.

Others appearances:

- Tekken 3D: Prime Edition
- Street Fighter X Tekken
- Galaga: TEKKEN Edition (unplayable enemy)

=== Kunimitsu I/II ===
- Nationality: (Japan) Japanese (both)
- Fighting style: Manji Ninjutsu
- Voiced by:

Kunimitsu I:
Katsuhiro Harada (TK)
Shiho Kikuchi (TK2 and TTT)
Megumi Toyoguchi (TTT2 and TKR)
Kunimitsu II:
Saori Hayami

In the original Tekken, Kunimitsu joins Yoshimitsu's Manji Clan. Kunimitsu gives up her Japanese citizenship to remain anonymous. Kunimitsu, like many other Manji Clan members, uses Manji ninjitsu and her thieving skills to steal from the rich and give to the poor. However, she began stealing for personal gain and was banished from the Manji Clan when Yoshimitsu discovered this. To support herself, she became a mechanic and engineer and started repairing air conditioners. She enters the inaugural King of Iron Fist Tournament after learning about Michelle Chang, a Native American woman who possesses a valuable treasure sought after by the tournament's head leader, Heihachi Mishima. Kunimitsu is defeated after facing Chang. In the game, Chang is Kunimitsu's sub-boss. In Tekken 2, Kunimitsu cares for her frail grandfather and discovers a mysterious power hidden in Yoshimitsu's sword, which has been passed down through generations of the Manji Clan. Kunimitsu enters the second King of Iron First Tournament, determined to steal the sword and replicate it for her grandfather. Kunimitsu loses to Yoshimitsu again. In the video game, Yoshimitsu is her sub-boss, and if she completes the story mode, Kunimitsu wields the sword and slices a rock in half, revealing the mysterious sword's power.

Kunimitsu retires as a kunoichi and marries a shinobi, who is said to be a master of an UN agent, Raven. Soon after, she gives birth to her daughter, who adopts her mother's name as a fellow kuniochi. Kunimitsu II began working various jobs within major corporations in order to steal specific items for her personal gain. She, like her mother, became interested in industrial technology and enrolled at Mishima Polytechnical School to investigate the Mishima Zaibatsu after learning of its possible connection to the Tekken Force. However, one day she discovered that her mother had become gravely ill and was bedridden as a result of her condition. Her mother tells her about Yoshimitsu's past, his feud with her mother, and his sword, which she has been unable to obtain. Kunimitsu II decides to participate in the King of Iron First Tournament, which appears in Tekken 7. Kunimitsu II's story is not considered canon in the video game series because she appears as a downloadable character. Furthermore, Kunimitsu II's ninjitsu-style attacks and command list were thought to be superior to her mother and father's attack levels. According to Harada, the decision to include Kunimitsu II was made to "move the story forward a bit", and the fact that the original character was added over 25 years ago "needs a little surprise and a new experience". The only exception where she is involved in the canon storyline is in Tekken 8, where the second Kunimitsu's undercover mission as a student at Mishima School remains the same, but as its vice president. During six months between Tekken 7 and Tekken 8, she and Reina initially acted hostile when they figured out each other's true motives, before deciding to co-operate for exchange informations they wanted to achieve. Kunimitsu found an information regarding an ancient sword Mishima Clan held at a now destroyed Hon-Maru, and it was her intel regarding the information of G Corporation'a next assault at New York she gave to Reina, which then sent it to Lidia and other resistance forces. Once she finds a cursed blade Kuantou from Hon-Maru ground zero, Kunimitsu learn that Yoshimitsu will be at Kazuya Mishima's tournament.

=== Lee Chaolan/Violet ===
- Nationality: (Japan) Japanese, but born in China
- Fighting style: Martial Arts (main fighting style), Mishima Style Fighting Karate (TK1, TK2 and TTT)
- Portrayed by: Anthony Pho (TTT2 live-action short film)
- Voiced by:
  Jōji Nakata (Tekken - Tekken Tag Tournament (laughs))
  Nozomu Sasaki (Tekken 2 - Tekken Tag Tournament)
  Shin-ichiro Miki (Tekken: The Motion Picture (Japanese))
  David Stokey (Tekken: The Motion Picture (English))
  Scott Reyns (TK4 ending, Western PS2 versions)
  Ryōtarō Okiayu (TK5—present; Tekken: Blood Vengeance (Japanese))
  Kaiji Tang (Tekken: Blood Vengeance (English), Tekken Tag Tournament 2 [as Violet])

Lee Chaolan (Chinese: 李 超狼; pinyin: Lǐ Chāoláng; Japanese: リー・チャオラン; Hepburn: Rī Chaoran) is the adoptive son of Heihachi Mishima, whose own son Kazuya's defeat is Lee's motivation for entering the numerous King of Iron Fist tournaments held throughout the Tekken series. Lee was adopted by Heihachi to provide a rival for Kazuya, who he felt was too weak to lead his Mishima Zaibatsu company. Lee studies in the United States alongside Paul Phoenix and Marshall Law. After Kazuya wins control of the company, Lee works as Kazuya's secretary, in addition to overseeing Kazuya's team of bodyguards and Dr. Bosconovitch's experiments, all while secretly hoping to take over the Zaibatsu. However, Lee is soon expelled from the Zaibatsu for unknown reasons while Heihachi disowns him, causing him to leave the world of fighting and pursuing a career in robotics.

Lee returns in Tekken 4 as a playboy with a fast-growing robotics business of his own. Upon learning that the Zaibatsu's rival G Corporation was attacked by the Tekken Force, Lee joins the fourth tournament with a vastly different appearance, competing under the name of Violet in order to conceal his identity, while hoping to test his new "Combot" experiment in the process. However, he is defeated in the later stages by Kazuya, whom Lee believed to be dead, but he then learns someone else has controlled the Zaibatsu in Heihachi's absence. Believing it to be Kazuya, Lee enters the fifth tournament in Tekken 5 to take him out personally and regain control of the Zaibatsu, but upon learning that the culprit is Kazuya's paternal grandfather Jinpachi, he drops out of the tournament and returns to his business.

After Kazuya legitimately takes control of the company, Lee enters the next tournament in attempt again to come in contact with Kazuya. In the game's "Scenario Campaign" story mode, Lee joins forces with Julia Chang, Lars Alexandersson, and Dr. Bosconovitch's android daughter Alisa, with a shared objective of stopping Kazuya and Jin, but Lee and Lars are not aware at first that Alisa was created to serve Jin, thus acting as a mole for Lars. When Alisa is destroyed at the climax, Lee promises Lars that she will be reconstructed with his company's resources, which he finally succeeds at the same time of Heihachi's return in the seventh tournament, shortly before the latter's true demise at the hands of Kazuya in their final battle. During the seventh tournament, Lee also recruits a journalist who lost his family in the war that occurred during the sixth tournament to join his cause, as well as a redeemed Jin to investigate how the Mishima affair first started.

In the eighth tournament, ahead of Kazuya's public revelation to the world as a devil, Lee manages to recruit Alisa's "father", Doctor Bosconovitch, and by extension, Manji Clan, to co-develop an aircraft carrier Víðópnir, and armored suits for their allies, including Lee himself against Kazuya, while also aiding the doctor in removing the remaining inhibitor inside Alisa's body, so as to set her free. In response of Jin's last encounter against Kazuya that caused the former to lose his will to control his devil a week before the latter announced the eight tournament, Lee summons the Kliesen Family for their expertise on researching the Devil Gene and its originator Azazel, recognizing that Niklas's child Leo also previously participated in the Tekken tournament as Lee was.

Lee is also selectable in the non-canon games Tekken Tag Tournament, Tekken Tag Tournament 2, Tekken 3D: Prime Edition, and Tekken Revolution.

As mentioned before, Violet was first introduced in Tekken 4 as an alter-ego of Lee Chaolan. Serving as his public persona as the CEO of Violet Systems, Lee used this alter-ego to allow himself to enter the fourth King of Iron Fist Tournament without being found out by the Mishima Zaibatsu. While primarily a main palette swap of Lee in most mainline games since his debut game, Tekken Tag Tournament 2 is the only game where Violet has his own character slot, even being the main character in the Fight Lab mode of the game.

Others appearances:

- Tekken 3D: Prime Edition - Lee

=== Marshall Law ===
- Nationality: (United States) American
- Fighting style: Jeet Kune Do
- Portrayed by: Cung Le (2009 film), Alexandre Vu (TTT2 live-action short film)
- Voiced by:
  Katsuhiro Harada (TK1–TK7 [grunts])
  Julian Macfarlane (TK4 [cutscenes])
  Robert Clotworthy (TK5 [cutscenes])
  David Vincent (TK6–present; Street Fighter X Tekken (English))
  Yoshimitsu Shimoyama (Japanese dub of the 2009 live-action film)
  Keisuke Fujii (Street Fighter X Tekken (Japanese))

Marshall Law (Japanese: マーシャル・ロー, Hepburn: Māsharu Rō) is a martial artist who owns a restaurant in San Francisco's Chinatown, and like his close friend Paul Phoenix, financial difficulty becomes his primary motive for entering the King of Iron Fist fighting tournaments held throughout the Tekken series. His appearance and fighting style are based on Hong Kong martial artist and actor Bruce Lee. Sometimes known as "The Fighting Chef", Law is the father of Forest Law. He enters the first King of Iron Fist Tournament in the original game in hopes of opening his own dojo with the winnings, Law would eventually draw against Wang Jinrei. Despite not winning the tournament, Marshall would eventually open his own dojo. However, in Tekken 2, his students are soon attacked and his dojo destroyed by Baek Doo San, provoking Law into entering the second tournament to seek revenge. Law would eventually face his villainous assailant and successfully defeated him, dropping out of the tournament after achieving his goal. In Tekken 3, his storyline details that he rebuilt his dojo while running a successful restaurant chain called "Marshall China" in the United States. Meanwhile, Paul convinces Marshall's son Forest Law to enter the third tournament, which causes friction between Law and Paul.

Similar to Paul's storyline in Tekken 4, Law's restaurant business goes under and he is consequently bankrupt. He attempts to use the fourth tournament as a crutch to ease his money troubles, but is unable to do so and he is afterwards relegated to taking a dishwashing job in Japan, where the tournaments are held. While participating in the fifth tournament in Tekken 5 in hopes of being able to cover medical bills stemming from Forest being hurt in a motorcycle accident, Law is deported to the United States upon discovery that he was employed illegally in Japan. Paul approaches Law with the proposition of forming a team for the upcoming sixth tournament, believing that the odds of victory (and winning the prize money) would be better as a group than individually, and Law accepts. They later add boxer Steve Fox to their ranks, while they did well in the tournament, Paul and Law ended up being paired against each other and they both fought to a draw, as a result they were unable to claim the top prize nor restore their respective previous aims.

Marshall's opponent during the seventh tournament was Feng Wei, whom Marshall initially planned to look after the recently restored dojo he neglected, but changes his mind and retreats when finding out how dangerous Feng is, prior to the latter's defeat by Leroy Smith. During Kazuya's tyranny in the eighth tournament, Marshall's dojo has been repossessed as a collateral before he finds out about the recent events. He temporarily joins the G Corporation in desperation to get his money to pay off his debt, and was deceived into believing Paul, who won the North American qualifier of the eight tournament unable to keep his promise, unaware that the tournament was cancelled during the quarter finals and is actually a set up for Kazuya's scheme. He and Paul are accidentally saved by Kuma from a G Corporation tank's rocket meant to hit him and Paul during the war. After Jin Kazama's victory against Kazuya, and signaling the world's freedom from the latter's tyranny, Marshall reconciles with Paul and returns to the good side where they and their allies, including Azucena, open food kitchens in Manhattan and help restore the city.

Marshall also appears in the noncanonical Tekken games Tekken Tag Tournament 2, Tekken Revolution, Street Fighter X Tekken, and the 2005 Namco beat 'em up Urban Reign. Marshall appears as a Spirit in the Nintendo crossover video game Super Smash Bros. Ultimate.

Others appearances:

- Tekken Resolute (unlockable)
- Tekken 3D: Prime Edition
- Street Fighter X Tekken
- Tekken Card Tournament
- Tekken Arena
- Galaga: TEKKEN Edition (unplayable enemy)

=== Paul Phoenix ===
- Nationality: (United States) American
- Fighting style: Integrated Martial Arts based on Judo
- Voiced by:
  Hōchū Ōtsuka (1998 drama CD, Tekken: Bloodline (Japanese))
  Eric Kelso (TK4—TK6, TK3D:PE (grunts))
  Jamieson Price (since TK6 (dialogue), grunts since TTT2; Tekken: Bloodline (English))
  Mike McFarland (Street Fighter X Tekken (English))
  Kanehira Yamamoto (Street Fighter X Tekken (Japanese))

Paul Phoenix (ポール・フェニックス, Pōru Fenikkusu) is an American biker and martial artist who regularly enters the King of Iron Fist fighting tournaments while hoping to use the prize money to pay off his debts, yet he falls short of victory each time due to various circumstances. He is also a friend of Marshall Law and his son, Forest, alongside a silver-haired man Lee Chaolan. Paul remained undefeated until he fought Kazuya Mishima to a draw, in the first King of Iron Fist Tournament he reached the semi-finals where he lost to Kazuya in a rematch after an hours-long fight. He battles his way to the finals of the King of Iron Fist Tournament 2 in Tekken 2, earning the right to have a rematch with Kazuya, but ended up getting replaced by another competitor, Heihachi Mishima, after getting stuck in traffic and therefore unable to make the match on time.

Paul goes undefeated throughout the entire King of Iron Fist Tournament 3 in Tekken 3, leaving victorious after defeating the "God of Fighting", Ogre. Unbeknownst to him, Ogre morphs into his monstrous form, True Ogre, after absorbing immense fighting force and is then defeated a second time by Paul's replacement Jin. As a result, by Tekken 4, Paul's dojo has gone out of business due to lack of students and he ends up being homeless. He again enters the King of Iron Fist Tournament 4 in an attempt to get his life back together and go head-to-head with Kazuya, a rival he had not fought in over 20 years.

During the first two tournaments, Paul had fought and defeated Kuma, a large brown bear trained in combat by Heihachi. After the animal dies of old age, Heihachi trains a replacement, also named Kuma, who was easily defeated by Paul in the third tournament but Kuma manages to defeat him in the early stages of the fourth tournament.

Paul adopts a new training regimen and gets his revenge against Kuma in the King of Iron Fist Tournament 5 in Tekken 5, but the match leaves Paul too exhausted to continue in the competition and he is forced to drop out. Again departing the tournament penniless and already burdened by his increasing debt, he wastes no time in entering the King of Iron Fist Tournament 6 in Tekken 6 in hopes of finally easing his financial troubles. This time, he believes assembling a team would increase his chances of victory, and so he joins forces with Marshall and a boxer Steve Fox. While they did well in the tournament, Paul and Marshall ended up being paired against each other and they both fought to a draw, as a result they were unable to claim the top prize.

He entered the King of Iron Fist Tournament 7 in Tekken 7 with not only the intention, but the necessity of winning as the hefty prize would keep him in the black. Things did not exactly pan out for him when the previous tournament got suspended. Paul returns in Tekken 8 as a playable character with new design and a significantly different hairstyle (although he was criticized for his new hairstyle). Paul and Steve join Jin's side against Kazuya's tyranny, while Marshall briefly joins Kazuya's side. After Kuma saves them, they help repair damages and celebrate Jin's victory.

He is one of four playable characters to appear in all main installments of the Tekken series, alongside Heihachi Mishima, Nina Williams and Yoshimitsu. Paul is also selectable in non-canon spin-off Tekken games such as Tekken Tag Tournament, Tekken Card Challenge, Tekken Advance, Tekken Tag Tournament 2, and Tekken Revolution, in addition to the crossover fighting game Street Fighter X Tekken. He is an unlockable character in the 2005 beat-'em-up multiplayer game Urban Reign. He also appears in SNK's mobile phone game The King of Fighters All Star. Paul appears as a Spirit in the Nintendo crossover video game Super Smash Bros. Ultimate.

Others appearances:

- Tekken Advance
- Tekken Resolute (unlockable)
- Tekken 3D: Prime Edition
- Street Fighter X Tekken
- Tekken Card Tournament
- Tekken Arena
- Galaga: TEKKEN Edition (unplayable enemy)

=== Wang Jinrei ===
- Nationality: (China) Chinese
- Fighting style: Xing Yi Quan
- Voiced by: Tamio Ōki (TK1-TTT); Hu Qian (TK5-TTT2 [dialogue]); Chan Ho (TK5-TTT2 [in-game grunts])

Wang Jinrei (Japanese: 王 椋雷(ワン・ジンレイ), Hepburn: Wan Jinrei; pinyin: Wáng Jīngléi) is an elderly Chinese old man who was a close friend of Heihachi Mishima's father Jinpachi, and lived as a recluse in the Mishima gardens. Wang tutors his distant relative Ling Xiaoyu (who debuts in Tekken 3) in the martial arts at a young age. He draws rival Marshall Law in the first King of Iron Fist Tournament, then enters the second tournament in Tekken 2 in order to fulfill the deceased Jinpachi's wishes of eliminating Heihachi and Jinpachi's grandson Kazuya, who have both followed the path of evil. Wang opts to face all challengers giving way to those adept enough to defeat Kazuya; however, Wang was defeated by Jun Kazama during the King of Iron Fist Tournament 2. In Tekken 5, set four decades after Jinpachi's death, Wang receives a letter from Jinpachi, who is actually alive but has been possessed by a demon, having been brought to life after starving to death years previously and requests Wang's participation in the King of Iron Fist Tournament 5. Wang was defeated in the later stages of the tournament by Jinpachi's great-grandson Jin Kazama whose purpose was to wipe out the Devil Gene which had been plaguing within both himself and Kazuya. Wang holds no grudge towards Jin for Jinpachi's death, but does also show distaste towards the Devil Gene.

Others appearances:

- Tekken 3D: Prime Edition

=== Yoshimitsu ===
- Nationality: (Japan) Japanese, but no longer a citizen / None
- Fighting style: Advanced Manji Ninjutsu
- Portrayed by: Gary Stearns (2009 film)
- Voiced by: Katsuhiro Harada (TK–TTT), Tomokazu Seki (TK4–present)

Yoshimitsu was first introduced in 1994's original Tekken. Kunimitsu's story in Tekken 2 reveals that Yoshimitsu's blade is passed down through the Manji Clan's leaders. The clan is dedicated to helping the weak and fighting oppression. Upon the inauguration of a new leader, their predecessor is ritually sacrificed, and the blade absorbs the person's power and skill. In the game's story, Yoshimitsu enters the first tournament as a decoy so as to allow other Manji to steal the tournament's funds unobserved. During the tournament, Yoshimitsu learns of Ganryu, a sumo wrestler whose disrespectful attitude in the ring cost him his promotion to the rank of yokozuna. His base disrespect for the sumo code infuriates Yoshimitsu, who defeats him. Later, Yoshimitsu leads a raid on Dr. Bosconovitch's lab in order to steal his Eternal Energy device. Though Yoshimitsu loses his arm during the operation, Bosconovitch helps him escape and fits him with a mechanical prosthetic replacement. Grateful for his help, he tells Bosconovitch that he may call on him whenever he needs help. In Tekken 2, Yoshimitsu learns that Bosconovitch has been kidnapped by the Mishima Zaibatsu and enters the second Tekken tournament to rescue him. Also, Kunimitsu, Yoshimitsu's former Manji Clan second-in-command, returns to the tournament in order to steal the clan's tachi. Yoshimitsu defeats her and drops out of the tournament to rescue the doctor after learning his location.

In Tekken 3, Yoshimitsu visits Dr. Bosconovitch, who is suffering from a disease that he caught when he built the Cold Sleep machine. Dr. Bosconovitch tells him that the disease can only be cured using the blood of Ogre, a god recently awakened from its deep slumber. Yoshimitsu then enters the King of Iron Fist Tournament 3 in order to obtain the Ogre's blood. During the tournament, he is targeted by Bryan Fury, a cyborg sent to kill him (and capture Dr. Bosconovitch) by Dr. Abel, Dr. Bosconovitch's rival. Yoshimitsu manages to defeat Bryan. The outcome of Yoshimitsu's search for Ogre's blood is unknown, though he most likely succeeds.

Two years later, during the events of Tekken 4, Yoshimitsu realizes that the future of his clan is waning due to a lack of necessary funds and manpower. Upon learning of The King of Iron Fist Tournament 4, he forms an alliance with Mishima Zaibatsu and enters the tournament. While Yoshimitsu is robbing the Mishima Zaibatsu mansion near the end of the tournament, he discovers an unconscious Bryan Fury. He takes him to Bosconovitch's lab so the doctor can transfer Bryan to a new body. Bosconovitch then injects Bryan with drugs to put him to a year-long sleep. However, when Yoshimitsu visits Bosconovitch's lab a month later, he finds it destroyed and many of his compatriots dead. An injured Dr. Bosconovitch tells him that Bryan woke up only a month after the injection and went on a rampage with his new body. Swearing revenge, Yoshimitsu enters the King of Iron Fist Tournament 5 (Tekken 5) to hunt Bryan.

In Tekken 6, While trying to find Bryan, Yoshimitsu learns that his sword is weakening. As his sword is cursed, it will lose its power and drive its user insane if it does not kill evildoers for a prolonged amount of time. He decides to adopt a second sword called Fumaken, which has the ability to suppress the cursed sword's properties, and enters the King of Iron Fist Tournament 6 (Tekken 6) in order to restore the power of the cursed sword. Following the tournament's end and Jin Kazama's disappearance, where Heihachi Mishima assumes the position of CEO of Mishima Zaibatsu, Yoshimitsu senses something amiss and decides to enter the King of Iron Fist Tournament 7 (Tekken 7) to confirm his suspicions.

In Tekken 8, Yoshimitsu now sports a demonic, ghostly-like voice, instead of a robotic one, in his new armor that has a fingerless glove which shows his organic human skin during the King of Iron Fist Tournament 8 (Tekken 8). Through Doctor Bosconovitch's co-operation with Lee Chaolan, Yoshimitsu and his clan becomes part of the rebellion against Kazuya's tyranny, and their new supplies are provided by Lee's company, Violet Systems, before Yoshimitsu set his journey to purify the namesake Yoshimitsu sword at the secret Manji Village. Additionally, it is revealed that the Manji gains an aid from the current Polish Prime Minister, Lidia Sobieska, for covert and intelligence operations, as well as rescuing her old friend Eddy Gordo from being killed in his failed assault attempt on G Corporation Millenium Tower. During the qualification tournament, Yoshimitsu and Eddy are tasked to rescue the surviving Tekken Force officers from being killed by a G Corporation unit led by Nina Williams, and later gain info from the survivors about the Tekken Monks, where he and Eddy accompanies Lidia to visit the monks' base, revealing that they rescued Heihachi from his last fight against Kazuya in the previous tournament, and revive him while putting him into an amnesiac state, in hopes to rehabilitate him. However, as Heihachi's rehabilitation backfires at the end of the trial when the evil in him returns, Yoshimitsu, Eddy and Lidia are unable to stop Heihachi from murdering all Tekken Monks and escaping.

==== Spin-off games ====
Yoshimitsu also appears in other Tekken games, namely Tekken Tag Tournament, Tekken Card Challenge, Tekken Advance, Tekken Resolute, Tekken Tag Tournament 2, Tekken 3D: Prime Edition and Tekken Card Tournament. Yoshimitsu has appeared in other Namco games. His Tekken 3 incarnation is a bonus character available in Anna Kournikova's Smash Court Tennis for the PlayStation and his Tekken 3 "energy sword" is one of the game's unlockable secret tennis racquets. Yoshimitsu's sword is also an available weapon in the Tekken spin-off game Death by Degrees. He appears in the Capcom-made crossover game Street Fighter X Tekken, where his official tag partner is Raven. One of his alternate costumes in the game is M. Bison's uniform, and Capcom stated that a "rumor says" that after defeating Bison, Yoshimitsu also took his Psycho Power ability as his own. Despite his body being either revealed like his arms or face, his voice never changes. This was seen in the PC Mods cutscenes from Street Fighter X Tekken. Yoshimitsu appears as a Spirit in the Nintendo crossover video game Super Smash Bros. Ultimate.

Yoshimitsu has brief cameos in the animated film Tekken: The Motion Picture. He also appears in the 2009 live-action film Tekken, portrayed by Gary Ray Stearns, where he fights and loses against Jin Kazama.

In 2006, Namco and MegaHouse released a Yoshimitsu figurine as part of a Tekken 5 set based on promotional artwork for the game. While not posable, the PVC figure came with equippable clothing modeled after those in the game. Two more figurines were made by Bandai in 2009, based on his appearance in Tekken 6. A statue of Yoshimitsu based on his appearance in Tekken Tag Tournament 2 was produced by Kotobukiya in 2012.

Others appearances:

- Tekken Advance
- Tekken Resolute (unlockable)
- Tekken 3D: Prime Edition
- Street Fighter X Tekken
- Tekken Card Tournament
- Galaga: TEKKEN Edition (unplayable enemy)
- Soulcalibur

== Introduced in Tekken 2 ==
=== Angel ===
- Nationality: Unknown, maybe none
- Fighting style: Mishima Style Karate
- Voiced by: Yumi Tōma (TTT1); Yuka Koyama (TTT2)

Angel (Japanese: エンジェル, Hepburn: Enjēru) is a female supernatural entity and opposite of Devil. According to Tekken series producer Katsuhiro Harada, she is the representation of what is left of the goodness in Kazuya Mishima after he had been controlled by Devil, although she herself is not a part of Kazuya's soul. Her Tekken Tag Tournament 2 profile states that she wields the power to purify things, and carries a compassionate and a cruel side. Angel was a palette swap of Devil in Tekken 2 and Tekken Tag Tournament, but receives a distinct design for Tekken Tag Tournament 2 while her fighting style borrowed from Kazuya and Devil Jin. Because of this, she has a laser attack: however, it is not a laser from her tiara, being actually more similar to a light beam.

Angel's existence is likely the results from the first encounters and strange attractions between Kazuya and Jun Kazama, until Kazuya lost half of his power at time when he unknowingly caused Jun to be pregnant, shortly before Kazuya's defeat by Heihachi in second tournament, then the birth of Jin Kazama.

=== Baek Doo San ===
- Nationality: (South Korea) South Korean
- Fighting style: Tae Kwon Do
- Voiced by:
  Kaneto Shiozawa (TK2 - TTT)
  Kyousei Tsukui (Tekken: The Motion Picture (Japanese))
  Lowell B. Bartholomee (Tekken: The Motion Picture (English))
  Yun Byeong-hwa (TK5 [dialogue] - TTT2)
  Il-Kwon Cho (TK5 [grunts])

Baek Doo San (Japanese: 白頭山(ペク・トー・サン), Hepburn: Peku Tō San; Hangul: 백두산 Baek Dusan) is a South Korean Tae Kwon Do practitioner who debuted in Tekken 2 as the sub-boss of Marshall Law. He accidentally kills his father during a sparring session, causing him to destroy several dojos—including Law's—in a fit of rage. He then challenges, and loses to, Law in the second tournament. In Tekken 3, Baek is presumed dead after encountering Ogre, and his student Hwoarang enters the third tournament to avenge his master's supposed death, but Tekken 5 reveals that Ogre had beaten Baek into a yearlong coma. After his recovery, Baek begins teaching traditional Tae Kwon Do at military bases. Hwoarang is drafted into the South Korean military but flees to compete in the fourth tournament, for which he is arrested, but is also informed that Baek is alive. After Hwoarang completes his service, he and Baek enter the fifth tournament to test Hwoarang's skills, but Baek later withdraws after Hwoarang is injured in battle and lays unconscious in the hospital for three days. Once he recovers, Baek and Hwoarang return to Korea, and devote themselves solely to improving their fighting skills. Baek's last playable appearance is in Tekken 6, in which he and Hwoarang enter the tournament together once again.

Others appearances:

- Tekken 3D: Prime Edition

=== Bruce Irvin ===
- Nationality: (United States) American
- Fighting style: Muay Thai
- Voiced by:
  Friedrich Kuhlau (TK2 and TTT)
  Seiji Sasaki (Tekken: The Motion Picture (Japanese))
  Peter Harrell, Jr. (Tekken: The Motion Picture (English))
  Crispin Freeman (TK5-TTT2 [cutscenes and dialogue])
  Marcus Lawrence (TK5-TTT2 [battle grunts])

Bruce Irvin (Japanese: ブルース・アーヴィン, Hepburn: Burūsu Āvin) is a muscular and Mohawked American Muay Thai practitioner. He lost his parents and older brother in his youth, and grew up in a violent environment. He longed to make a difference, and became a police officer. He was sent to Japan to investigate the multinational conglomerate Mishima Zaibatsu and its leader, Kazuya Mishima, who knew of Bruce's mission and therefore arranged for his flight to crash. Bruce survives the crash but becomes an amnesiac, and Kazuya hires him as his bodyguard. In Tekken 2, Bruce fought his old police partner Lei Wulong, who had entered the tournament to arrest Kazuya. Bruce was defeated and attempted to escape on another plane, but it somehow exploded later. In truth, Bruce survives and fakes his death off-screen. He is then absent from the series until returning in Tekken 5 as an unlockable character. After becoming reacquainted with Kazuya Mishima in the tournament, Bruce assists Kazuya in taking over G Corporation, a biotech firm, when its Nebraska branch which fully recovers Kazuya from his previous injuries suddenly betrays him. G Corporation then wages war with the Mishima Financial Group, now led by Jin Kazama, and Bruce becomes the captain at G Corporation's private corps and is enlisted by Kazuya to lead the army on battlefields. G Corporation attempts to gain an advantage by placing an enormous bounty on Jin, which results in the staging of the sixth tournament, in which Bruce is selectable from the start and participates in an attempt to capture Jin.

Bruce makes a brief appearance in Tekken: The Motion Picture, serving as Lee Chaolan's bodyguard and fighting Jack-2 on a boat en route to the tournament.

Brenda Brathwaite of The Escapist, in 2008, included Bruce among many black fighting game characters, such as Mortal Kombat's Jax and Street Fighter's Balrog, as "either non-existent or consistent in their overall attributes". Bruce's Tekken 5 render was additionally the lone character illustration that was used for the article.

Others appearances:

- Tekken 3D: Prime Edition

=== Jun Kazama/Unknown ===
- Nationality: (Japan) Japanese
- Fighting style: Kazama Style Traditional Martial Arts
- Portrayed: Tamlyn Tomita (2009 film)
- Voiced by:
  Shiho Kikuchi (Tekken 2, Tekken Tag Tournament)
  Yumi Tōma (Tekken: The Motion Picture (Japanese), Tekken Tag Tournament [as Unknown])
  Eri Sendai (Tekken: The Motion Picture (Japanese)) (young)
  Edi Patterson (Tekken: The Motion Picture (English))
  Lucy Farris (Tekken: The Motion Picture (English)) (young)
  Yūko Sasaki (Japanese dub of the 2009 live-action film)
  Mamiko Noto (Tekken Tag Tournament 2 - onwards; Tekken: Bloodline (Japanese))
  Vivian Lu (Tekken: Bloodline (English))

Jun Kazama (風間 準, Kazama Jun) is an officer of the wildlife protection organization WWWC. She is called "The Chosen One" by her relatives and one of the two last known members of her clan's main branch. She is highly psychic, being able to sense that Kazuya Mishima's power stemmed from Devil. At the WWWC's orders, she sets out to arrest Kazuya, who smuggles environmentally-protected animals, Jun decides to enter the King of Iron Fist Tournament 2. When the second tournament was coming to an end, Jun comes to the realization that Kazuya's supernatural strength stems from Devil, though she is attracted to him by a mystic force beyond her control. Besides her duty to arrest Kazuya, she wants to free him of his evil power and drops out of the tournament as a result. At some point during this time, Jun became pregnant with Kazuya's child; whilst Jun was able to cause conflict within Kazuya, swaying Devil's hold over him, ultimately she was unable to prevent him from going to meet his father, Heihachi Mishima, in the tournament finals. After Kazuya is thrown into a volcano by Heihachi at the conclusion of the tournament, Jun is attacked by Devil, but she defeats him. Jun returns to her home in the forests of Yakushima, where she raises her son, Jin, away from danger, training him in traditional Kazama-Style martial arts. 15 years later, before the events of Tekken 3, Jun senses the approaching of Ogre and warns Jin to seek out his grandfather Heihachi should anything happen to her. One night, Ogre does indeed attack. Jin attempts to defend his mother, but is quickly knocked unconscious. When he wakes up, the Kazama house has burned to the ground and Jun is missing. Jin is devastated and swears revenge on Ogre.

Although Jun did not appear in subsequent canonical games in the series for many years, she is still mentioned throughout. She appears as a vision in Jin Kazama's Tekken 4 ending, which persuades Jin to spare Heihachi's life in her honor. She is also mentioned numerous times by Jin and Kazuya during the prologue of the Scenario Campaign mode of Tekken 6, which retells the main events of previous games. Outside of the main series, Jun appears as a playable character in the non-canonical Tekken Tag Tournament as well as its sequel, Tekken Tag Tournament 2, where she is fought as a boss and transforms into Unknown in the final stage after defeating her. She is also playable in the free-to-play spin-off Tekken Revolution.

Jun made her return to the canonical story in Tekken 8, after being revealed as a playable character in a trailer at The Game Awards 2022. Despite previously being presumed dead by her son following her encounter with Ogre, series director Katsuhiro Harada confirmed that Jun never actually died, but was simply missing. Jun explains that during their battle, in order to save Jin, she lured Ogre to the Kazama Sanctuary on Yakushima, a sacred ground passed down through generations of her family. Here, she defeated the creature, but was gravely wounded. Guided by a mystic force, she lay on the sanctuary's alter, where she fell into a coma-like state, recovering from her injuries. Despite being unconscious, Jun saw visions of the fierce battle between Jin and Kazuya. Using her Kazama powers, she was able to project a vision of herself to Jin, gifting him the power necessary to purify himself of the Devil gene, before encouraging him to also purify Kazuya. Having saved Jin, Jun wakes from her coma. Following the fight between Jin and Kazuya, in which the two were successfully purified by Jun's Kazama power, Jun is seen arriving at the side of an unconscious Kazuya.

Unknown

Unknown (アンノウン, Announ) made her debut in 1999 in the non-canonical Tekken Tag Tournament, where she serves as the final boss. Unknown also appears as a rival unit in the tactical role-playing game Project X Zone 2.

Unknown appears to be a tortured soul who has been enslaved by the "Forest Demon" (which takes the form of a wolf-like appearance and appears behind her in fights, controlling and mimicking her actions). She has many demonic traits, such as glowing yellow eyes and no sclera, and a devil symbol tattooed on her upper right arm which resembles that of Jin Kazama's. Her default "costume" appears to have her otherwise nude body mostly covered in purple with short, dark brown hair, shiny body paint, or oil as if she had been submerged in it to her chest. Her second, alternate costume shows her dressed in the burnt, ripped remains of a dark brown dress, with bandages wrapped around her arms, shins, and instep.

Unknown did not have a story as Tag Tournament was non-canonical, though her ending shows her finally defeating the Forest Demon and therefore freeing herself. Her appearance as the final boss in Tekken Tag Tournament 2 looks like Jun's alternate form (black hair with a similar fashion to Jun, though her eyes have demon-like pupils and this time has normal white sclera). An artbook included in the Tekken 6 Arcade Stick Bundle revealed that she was meant to be Jun's sister enslaved by the "Forest Demon" before the scenario was ultimately dropped.

Similar to Mokujin, Unknown does not have an original moveset. Instead, she mimics other characters' fighting styles (with some exceptions), though her fighting style defaults to that of Jun Kazama. In Tag Tournament 2, she instead uses Jun's moveset with added boss-like moves such as summoning spikes and giant hands. In both her incarnations of the first Tag Tournament and its sequel, Unknown has originally appeared as an unplayable final boss in the arcade versions. She was later made a playable character in the console version of both games, with the former giving her the ability to freely switch her fighting styles using analog stick and the latter toning down her boss moves.

=== Lei Wulong ===
- Nationality: (China) Chinese
- Fighting style: Five Animals and Zui Quan
- Voiced by:
  Wataru Takagi (TK2)
  Hiroya Ishimaru (TK3—TK5 (archived grunts in TK6–TK7), SFxTK (Japanese))
  Akio Nakamura (Tekken: The Motion Picture (Japanese))
  Gray G. Haddock (Tekken: The Motion Picture (English))
  David Jeremiah (TK5-present; SFXTK (English))

Making his debut in Tekken 2 (1995), Lei Wulong (雷 武龍(レイ・ウーロン), Rei Ūron; pinyin: Léi Wǔlóng Jyutping: Leoi Mou Lung) is a respected police officer who has put countless criminals behind bars, which earns him the nickname of "Super Police". While investigating the nefarious Mishima Zaibatsu corporation's illegal hunting and trading practices, he ends up fighting former fellow officer Bruce Irvin, who has switched his allegiance to Kazuya Mishima, son of Mishima Zaibatsu CEO Heihachi Mishima. After Lei defeats Bruce, Bruce escapes in a plane that later crashes, he somehow survives.

After the second King of the Iron Fist Tournament during the events of Tekken 3 (1998), Lei's reputation as a crime fighter wanes and his work declines after his girlfriend dumps him for his assistant. When he discovers that a syndicate will send Nina Williams to kill professional boxer Steve Fox, he sets out to stop her and restore his reputation by joining the fourth tournament in Tekken 4 (2001). Lei is successful in thwarting the assassination and captures Nina, but Steve intervenes and frees Nina by assaulting Lei. Lei nonetheless breaks up the syndicate that had dispatched Nina to the tournament.

Lei's storyline in Tekken 5 has him shipped off to Japan in pursuit of Feng Wei, who is responsible for the destruction of multiple dojos in Japan and China, including Asuka Kazama's family dojo. At the same time, he joins forces with Steve in an attempt to destroy the Mishima Zaibatsu while finding evidence behind their dubious activities, including Steve's further past. However, Feng's trail goes cold and Lei has no choice but to return to Hong Kong. In Tekken 6 (2007), Lei enters the sixth tournament in attempt to arrest Jin Kazama, as well as not forgetting his father Kazuya. In the sixth game's "Scenario Campaign" story mode, Lei is assisted by Lars Alexandersson and Alisa Bosconovitch in defeating the invading G Corporation's forces at the "ICPO Branch Office", and informs them that Kazuya has claimed the corporation by force.

Lei returned in Tekken 7 as one of the Season 2 DLC characters, although drastically redesigned. Depending on which stance he is in, Lei will utilize different Rage Drives. In his story biography, while once again investigating Kazuya's illegal activities undercover, but this time on G Corporation, Lei also planned to meet the corporation's hired mascot Lucky Chloe secretly, whom Lei is a big fan of.

Lei appears as a playable character in the non-canon Tekken titles Tekken Card Challenge, Tekken Tag Tournament, Tekken Tag Tournament 2 and Tekken 3D: Prime Edition. He appears as a playable downloadable character in Street Fighter X Tekken.

Lei appears in the 1998 animated film Tekken: The Motion Picture, in which he is partnered with Jun Kazama to investigate the Mishima Zaibatsu's illegal activities during the tournament. Rather than actually competing in the tournament, Lei infiltrates the island's underground base with Jack-2's help. He was voiced by Akio Nakamura, and by Gray G. Haddock in the English dub.

Others appearances:

- Tekken 3D: Prime Edition
- Street Fighter X Tekken (paid DLC, except in PlayStation Vita)

=== Roger, Roger Jr. and Alex ===
- Nationality: Unknown/None (all three)
- Fighting style: Commando Wrestling

Roger family line and Alex are comic-relief characters who make their first appearances in Tekken 2. They are genetically modified animals created by Dr. Bosconovitch, under Kazuya's orders. Roger (ロジャー, Rojā) was crafted from kangaroo DNA, and Alex (アレックス, Arekkusu) from Dromaeosaurid fossil samples. However, Kazuya considered them worthless and wanted to kill them, but they escaped and met Armor King, who schooled them in wrestling. Alex and Roger compete in the second Iron Fist Tournament, where Jun Kazama, a WWWC wildlife-protection program officer, is dispatched to arrest Kazuya. She finds Roger and Alex and relocates them to a safe location in Australia. Alex disappears from the series canon thereafter while Roger's story is expanded in Tekken 5, in which he is not playable but appears in the game's cinematic sequences, where he, now renamed as Roger Sr. (ロジャーシニア, Rojā Shinia) is shown to be married with a son named Roger Jr., who is a kangaroo with human attributes like his father. After Roger Sr. is abducted by Mishima Zaibatsu, Roger Jr. enters the fifth tournament to find him but discovers that he was not abducted but instead secretly living a luxurious lifestyle. In Tekken 6, Roger Sr., again not playable, and his wife are since divorced but she suffers financial hardship without his presence and currently. She and Roger Jr. both participate in the sixth tournament in hopes of establishing financial security. Roger and Alex both appear in the noncanonical Tekken Tag Tournament and Tekken Tag Tournament 2, in which Roger Jr. is playable in Roger Sr.'s stead. As Tekken Tag Tournament 2 is semi-canon and set between Tekken 6 and Tekken 7, Alex and Roger Jr.'s endings eventually ties to Roger Sr.'s reconciliation with his family.

Others appearances:

- Tekken 3D: Prime Edition - Roger Jr.

== Introduced in Tekken 3 ==
=== Ancient Ogre/True Ogre ===
- Nationality: None, comes from outer space
- Fighting style: Personal style, sampled from many fighters
- Voiced by: Bill Butts (Tekken: Bloodline)

The Ogres (オーガ, Ōga) are believed to be series of biological weapon who takes male human appearances abandoned on different locations of earth by an ancient alien race, they are additionally worshipped by ancient tribes as the "Fighting Gods". There are two known Ogres on Earth. The first Ogre who landed at Mexico is a malicious being, while another Ogre who landed at Madagascar is a benelovent being.

Mexican Ogre

In Tekken 3 (1997), Heihachi Mishima sends his personal army, the Tekken Force, to search an abandoned Aztec temple in central Mexico, but they are promptly obliterated by the recently reawakened Mexican Ogre. Having witnessed his power firsthand, Heihachi seeks an opportunity to use him in hopes of creating the ultimate life form while staving off his own aging process, and therefore stages the third edition of the King of Iron Fist Tournament held throughout the Tekken series in order to draw Ogre out. In the meantime, Ogre kills King in combat, beats Baek Doo San into a yearlong coma, and supposedly kills Jin's mother Jun Kazama. Paul Phoenix defeats Ogre in the tournament finals, but he then quits the competition under the impression that he has won, when he had one last opponent remaining in Ogre's true form, True Ogre. Heihachi then collects blood samples and skin tissue from the creature in order to splice his genomes with his own, but the project is unsuccessful, as he is missing a key ingredient called the "Devil Gene", which the series protagonist Jin Kazama and his father Kazuya possess. In Tekken 5 (2004), Ogre is playable in the "Arcade History" mode and is the final boss of the "Devil Within" minigame, where clones of him and Heihachi are defeated by Jin Kazama.

The Mexican Ogre also appears in the non-canon games Tekken Card Challenge and Tekken Mobile, and is playable in the spinoff titles Tekken Tag Tournament and in Tekken Tag Tournament 2, whereas the latter Tag game has his True Ogre form as part of the starting roster and simply dubbed as Ogre since its arcade version, while his initial form, Ancient Ogre is exclusively free downloadable post-launch character.

Others appearances:

- Namco X Capcom (enemy unit) - Ancient Ogre
- Street Fighter X Tekken (unlockable) - Ancient Ogre

Madagascy Ogre

First appearing in Tekken 8 through his current vessel and a new fighter, Miary Zo, he is referred to as a Silver Fighting God by the local tribe of Madagascar. Unlike the Mexican Ogre, the Madagascy Ogre was a benelovent hero who protects humans rather than attacking them. He is only shown in his True form that resembles Mexican Ogre's Tekken Tag 2 appearance, but sports a lion-like face as the player 2 appearance of Mexican Ogre's True form, a unicorn horn and a white angelic feathered wings.

=== Bryan Fury ===
- Nationality: (United States) American
- Fighting style: Kickboxing
- Portrayed by: Gary Daniels (Tekken films)
- Voiced by:
  David Schaufele (Tekken 4 - onwards)
  Kazuyoshi Hayashi (Japanese dub of the live-action Tekken films)
  Keith Silverstein (Street Fighter X Tekken (English))
  Tomokazu Seki (Street Fighter X Tekken (Japanese))

Bryan Fury (Japanese: ブライアン・フューリー, Hepburn: Buraian Fyūrī) was once an officer in the International Police Organization, Bryan was killed during a shootout in Hong Kong one day. His corpse was transported to the laboratory of a mad scientist named Dr. Abel in his attempt to complete his project of forming a cyborg army. Abel thought that a perfect cyborg must have the mechanics built by his rival Bosconovitch, so he reanimated Fury's body and sent him to collect data on similar plans by his rival, Dr. Bosconovitch. Bryan enters the King of Iron Fist Tournament 3, targeting Yoshimitsu, who has strong ties with Bosconovitch, but during the tournament, Bryan was defeated by Yoshimitsu.

In Tekken 4, Dr. Abel abandons Bryan when Heihachi Mishima and the Mishima Zaibatsu corporation recruits him as its top scientific advisor. This sends Bryan into a murderous rage, and he enters the King of Iron Fist Tournament 4, feeling victory will force Abel to change his body, thus becoming the most incredible being in existence once again. This does not happen, and after his loss, Bryan instead uses his last ounce of strength to knock Abel out before losing consciousness and left him to die in the burning laboratory. Yoshimitsu brings him to Dr. Bosconovitch, who promises to transfer Bryan's mind into a new body, although it will take a whole year.

In Tekken 5, however, Bryan awakens a month later. Bosconovitch tells Bryan that his body was too complex to work with, but as a last resort, he had installed a perpetual power generator in him as an emergency measure. Upon learning this, Bryan attacks Bosconovitch and the Manji clan members assigned to guard the doctor, and leaves the laboratory. Bryan enters the King of Iron Fist Tournament 5 to test his performance with the generator installed, unaware that Yoshimitsu is pursuing him for revenge. Yoshimitsu's repeated meddling hinders Bryan's hopes of unlocking the generator's true powers in the King of Iron Fist Tournament 5. Soon afterwards, Yoshimitsu defeats Bryan and his frustration reaches its pinnacle, and he begins to destroy everything in sight after leaving the tournament. Driven by rage, he ventures to various battlefields around the world, indiscriminately leveling everything in his way into rubble. However, he soon grows tired of the same thing repeating itself countless times. Around this time, he catches wind of the King of Iron Fist Tournament 6. Hungry for more capable prey, Bryan headed for the tournament to prove his mettle. Bryan also appears in Tekken 7, being one of the 18 characters available in the first location tests of the game. As of Tekken 8, Bryan develops a new taste for anarchy, and even joins G Corporation's side for his own end.

Bryan also appears in Tekken Card Challenge, Tekken Tag Tournament, Tekken 3D: Prime Edition, Tekken Tag Tournament 2, and Tekken Revolution. Bryan appears in Capcom-made crossover fighting game Street Fighter X Tekken as a DLC character with Jack-X as his official tag partner. His Swap Costume is modeled after Urien. According to the download blurb, with his powers and abilities being recognized by Urien, the second in command of a mysterious organization, Bryan is brought into their ranks. Additionally, M. Bison's Swap Costume is modeled after Bryan's appearance.

Others appearances:

- Tekken 3D: Prime Edition
- Street Fighter X Tekken (paid DLC, except in PlayStation Vita)

=== Crow ===
- Nationality: Unknown, there are several people - all unknown
- Fighting style: Military Training

Crow (カラス, Karasu) is a codename assigned for the lowest ranking members of the Tekken Force, the others being, in ascending order, Falcon, Hawk, and Owl, who all appear as enemies in Tekken 3's Tekken Force minigame. Crow made his first and only playable appearance in Tekken Card Challenge as an unlockable character, and also appears in Tekken Tag Tournament 2 as a non-playable opponent in the Fight Lab mode.

=== Dr. Bosconovitch ===
- Nationality: (Russia) Russian
- Fighting style: Everything that he knows
- Voiced by:
  Tamio Ōki (Tekken: The Motion Picture (Japanese))
  Ken Webster (Tekken: The Motion Picture (English))
  Alexander Golovchanskiy (Tekken Tag Tournament 2)
  Jamieson Price (Tekken: Bloodline (English))

Dr. Bosconovitch (ボスコノビッチ博士, Bosukonobitchi hakase) originally worked for the Mishima Zaibatsu. During the first Tekken, the Manji ninja clan (led by Yoshimitsu) raided the Mishima Zaibatsu's vault. During the raid, Yoshimitsu lost his arm and was found by Bosconovitch who helped him escape and fitted him with a mechanical arm. Dr. Bosconovitch was kidnapped by Kazuya Mishima in the run-up to The King of Iron Fist Tournament 2 and was forced to work for him. Some of the many projects involved the creation of the bio-weapons Roger and Alex, as well as the completion of the Prototype Jack unit. He began the "Cold Sleep" project as a means of preserving his daughter's body (who seemingly died) by using Nina Williams and Anna Williams as test subjects. After completing his tasks, and before being executed, Doctor Bosconovitch is rescued by the friend he helped save previously, Yoshimitsu. Nineteen years later, he contracted a rare disease that affects the spine as a result of working on his Cold Sleep project. In order to cure himself and to revive his daughter, he needed the blood of the fighting god, Ogre. He turned to an old friend, Yoshimitsu, for help. Yoshimitsu entered the King of Iron Fist Tournament 3 and was successful in obtaining a sample of Ogre's blood after Jin Kazama had killed it. Dr. Bosconovitch appears in Bryan Fury's Tekken 4 ending. In it, he explains to Bryan that he will now mechanize him and allow him to be completely reborn in a new incarnation. Bryan lies supine on the table and Bosconovitch holds a gun-shaped device containing sleeping gas. Bidding him sweet dreams, he injects the gas into Bryan. Throughout, he speaks in a calm and gentle tone. However, the doctor found Bryan's body too complex, and he instead installed a perpetual generator. Bryan proceeded to attack the doctor, as well as Manji Clan members who were with him. While the members were slain, Bosconovitch survived, though he was severely injured until he made his full recovery by the time of Tekken 7. In Tekken 6, he creates an android in his daughter's image, Alisa Bosconovitch. At the same time Tekken 8 begins, where he and the Manji Clan joins a rebellion via his cooperation with Violet Systems against Kazuya's tyranny, the doctor reunites with his "daughter" and fully removes the inhibitor installed in her body to let her go with her own free will.

Dr. Bosconovitch appears in Tekken Tag Tournament's minigame Tekken Bowl mode, where he can be seen in the crowd of people cheering. It is even possible to "take him out" using a bowling ball. He also appears in Tekken Hybrid where he returns again as an onlooker in the crowd of Tekken Bowl (there is also a trophy named after him called "Doctor B!" with the description being "K.O. an onlooker in Tekken Bowl" with an icon of Bryan as the picture). He returns in Tekken Tag Tournament 2 as part of a free update. Although he does not appear in person in Death by Degrees, Nina Williams' spin-off game, he is mentioned several times in journals and documents, and he has a laboratory on the Solitaria Penitentiary island, although it is abandoned. Dr. Bosconovitch was mentioned by several Tekken characters in Capcom-made crossover fighting game Street Fighter X Tekken.

Others appearances:

- Tekken Arena (unplayable enemy)

=== Forest Law ===
- Nationality: (United States) American
- Fighting style: Martial Arts (based on Jeet Kune Do)
- Voiced by: Katsuhiro Harada (TK3-TTT), David Vincent (TTT2)

Forest Law (Japanese: フォレスト・ロウ, Hepburn: Foresuto Rou) is the good-natured son of Marshall Law who made his first playable appearance in the Tekken series, replacing his father in Tekken 3. He hopes to follow his father's footsteps as a fighter, but Marshall forbids him to enter contests of any kind, even the King of Iron Fist Tournament. However, Forest's friend and sparring partner Paul Phoenix convinces him to enter the third King of Iron Fist Tournament behind his father's back, causing a rift between Paul and Marshall. Forest is mentioned in Tekken 5 as having been hospitalized after a motorcycle accident, which becomes Marshall's motive for entering the tournament. He is playable in Tekken Tag Tournament as a replacement of his father Marshall Law and in Tekken Tag Tournament 2 as a console-exclusive character.

Others appearances:

- Tekken Advance

=== Hwoarang ===
- Nationality: (South Korea) South Korean
- Fighting style: Taekwondo
- Portrayed by: Daren Nop (TTT2 live-action short film)
- Voiced by:
  Toshiyuki Morikawa (Tekken 3 - Tekken Advance, Tekken 4 (grunts (all versions), dialogue (arcade/Japanese PS2 versions), Tekken: Bloodline (Japanese))
  Lee Jeong-gu (Tekken 4 (international PS2 versions, dialogue))
  Um Sang-hyun (Tekken 5 - onwards)
  Chris Rickabaugh (Street Fighter X Tekken (English))
  Tomoaki Maeno (Street Fighter X Tekken (Japanese))
  Todd Haberkorn (Tekken: Bloodline (English))

Hwoarang (Japanese: ファラン, Hepburn: Faran; Hangul: 화랑 Hwarang) was born in South Korea, a proud student of Baek Doo San and extremely proficient in the martial art of Taekwondo, Hwoarang used his skills to gamble in street fights with his other gang members. During these street fights, Hwoarang would lure his opponents in by sending his gang members to pose as weaker fighters. Once his gang members had been defeated, Hwoarang would enter and defeat his opponents to win the money at stake. One day, Hwoarang lured in an opponent by the name of Jin Kazama and they fought to a draw. This was the first time Hwoarang did not outright win a match and he immediately rushed to his master to tell him the news. Upon arriving at Baek Doo San's dojo, Hwoarang finds that his master had been apparently slain by Ogre, The God of Fighting. Hwoarang enters The King of Iron Fist Tournament 3 to defeat Jin Kazama and to seek revenge for his master, Hwoarang got to fight Jin in the later stages of the tournament but he was narrowly defeated after an hours-long fight very similar to the fight between Jin's father Kazuya Mishima and his rival Paul Phoenix in the first King of Iron Fist Tournament.

Returning to South Korea, Hwoarang was drafted into the South Korean military and was assigned to a special operations division. Although his successes in various missions were highly regarded along with his prowess at Taekwondo and combat techniques, his penchant for disobeying rules and orders gave his senior officers more than a few headaches. Hwoarang was uninterested in military life and felt a strange emptiness within him. He longingly recalled the days of hustling money in street fights and the rush he experienced from hand-to-hand combat. He often thought of one fight in particular - the fight against Jin Kazama; These longings could not be quelled by the military. One day, Hwoarang found out about the announcement of The King of Iron Fist Tournament 4. Hwoarang's blood stirred. He would defeat Jin, Heihachi Mishima, and anyone else who dared to challenge him to claim the Mishima Zaibatsu. Filled with excitement he had not felt in years, Hwoarang slipped away from the military base and headed for the Tournament.

The South Korean Army took Hwoarang into custody during the later stages of the King of Iron Fist Tournament 4, keeping him from his long-awaited fight with Jin Kazama. Upon his arrival at the embassy, Hwoarang is granted an official pardon by the ambassador and is given urgent military papers. Hwoarang immediately flies to South Korea to complete his training, which he completes in time to enter The King of Iron Fist Tournament 5, once again hoping to get a rematch with Jin Kazama. He also had a brief reunion with his master, Baek, who he thought was killed, standing as a visitor. Hwoarang hears the details from Baek. In The King of Iron Fist Tournament 5, Hwoarang faced Jin and defeated him in the semi-finals of the tournament. While Jin was lying on the ground, suddenly, he roars paranormally and produces a gale that blows Hwoarang away. From Jin's back, two black wings spread, and Jin stands up in his devil form. Hwoarang is at his wits end. He is not able to fight back, and soon he is knocked unconscious.

When Hwoarang wakes up, he finds himself in the hospital, and Baek is sitting besides him. He ignores his nurse and tries to move from his bed. He falls down in order to beseech Baek to make him stronger. After leaving the hospital, Hwoarang starts training with unprecedented devoutness in order to defeat the "paranormal" Jin. Thus, with the announcement of The King of Iron Fist Tournament 6, he prepares for the tournament.

Hwoarang appears in Tekken 7, being one of the eighteen characters initially available in the game. In both of his and Devil Jin's endings reveals that Hwoarang temporarily lost use of his right eye after saving Jin from a grenade thrown by UN soldiers pursuing Jin. His ending takes place before Lars would rescue Jin, wherein Hwoarang finally defeats his rival's devil form, but is still left unsatisfied about killing a monster like Jin.

Hwoarang later returns in Tekken 8, where his right eye heals, and dyes his hair color back to orange six months later, as well as having reconciled his rivalry with Jin into friendly terms once again. After meeting Asuka Kazama, Jin's cousin, along with tournament finalist Lili de Rochefort, he learns that Kazuya's tournament was a set-up to lure Zafina into his trap and eventually absorb Azazel to become a true devil. He ultimately joins Jin and his allies against G Corporation.

Others appearances:

- Tekken Advance
- Tekken 3D: Prime Edition
- Street Fighter X Tekken
- Tekken Card Tournament (unlockable)

=== Mokujin/Tetsujin/Kinjin ===
- Nationality: (Japan) Japanese, but not a citizen (Mokujin only) / Unknown/None (Tetsujin and Kinjin only)
- Fighting style: Mimicry
- Voiced by:
  Mary Elizabeth McGlynn (Tekken: Blood Vengeance, English) (Mokujin)
  Keiko Nemoto (Tekken: Blood Vengeance, Japanese) (Mokujin)

Mokujin

Mokujin (木人; lit. "wood-person") is a training dummy made from a 2,000-year-old tree. He comes alive in the presence of great evil and it was said that he would become the world's last resort when humanity is unable to deal with them. While he appears to be mute (his "voice" is the sounds of wood-clicks), he is able to communicate with the humans using telepathy. Due to his experience as a dummy, he is able to imitate any fighting style.

In Tekken 3, Mokujin awakens when Ogre, the God of Fighting, is released. After Jin Kazama defeats True Ogre, Mokujin returns to lifelessness. He reawakens in Tekken 5 with the rise of Jinpachi Mishima but again becomes dormant after Jinpachi's defeat. In Tekken 6, he comes alive once more when Azazel, a source of great evil, rises. Mokujin also appears in the non-canonical Tekken Tag Tournament games and as an unplayable boss in Tekken Revolution and Tekken Mobile.

Others appearances:

- Tekken Bowl App (cameo)
- Tekken 3D: Prime Edition
- Galaga: TEKKEN Edition (unplayable enemy)

Tetsujin

Tetsujin (鉄人; lit. "iron person") first appearing in Tekken Tag Tournament. Whereas Mokujin is constructed of wood, Tetsujin is constructed of iron. Both characters use the fighting styles of the other characters, and they both switch fighting styles between each round. While Mokujin's "fighting style" is referred as "Mokujin-ken", Tetsujin's is called "Tetsujin-ken", and similarly is the only sentence written in the movelist screen. He rarely appears in subsequent games, although Mokujin can be customized to look like Tetsujin in later installments. Tetsujin also appears as one of the unplayable penultimate bosses in free-to-play game Tekken Revolution and Tekken (Mobile).

Kinjin

Kinjin (金人; lit. "gold(en) person") is a secret unplayable boss character in the free-to-play game Tekken Revolution. His design is likely based on an easter egg in the console version of Tekken Tag Tournament, where meeting certain requirements would cause Tetsujin's normally silver color to turn gold. In Tekken Revolution, he is basically Tetsujin made of gold wearing a crown, glasses, mustache, bow tie, and a cape. He is one of the Stage 7 penultimate bosses in Arcade mode, along with Mokujin, Tetsujin, Heihachi Mishima, and Jinpachi Mishima.

=== Panda ===
- Nationality: (China) Chinese, but not a citizen
- Fighting style: Kuma Shinken (Later Adopts Baguazhang in Tekken 8 as a secondary style)
- Voiced by: Taketora (Tekken: Blood Vengeance)

Panda is, as her name implies, always depicted as a giant panda with pink or orange glowing bands and a green holster wrapped around her shoulder. The holster has grass inside of it. Since her introduction, she has always been a palette swap of Kuma, and thus has the same move set as him. In Tekken Tag Tournament 2, she is separated from Kuma and is given her own slot, even though she still has the same move set as Kuma's. They have the same moves, stance, and animations (shown before and after a fight), but their endings are always, in some way, different. However, their animations (shown before and after a fight) are differentiated in Tekken Tag Tournament 2, then followed by Tekken 7, where their movesets are identical except for their Rage Arts. Starting in Tekken 8, the bears begin to differ in fighting style somewhat as their styles begin to be more influenced by their respective owners.

Panda is the pet of Ling Xiaoyu in the games since Tekken 3. Kuma is in love with Panda, but she is not interested in him romantically. Panda is cared for at Xiaoyu's high school. To participate in the tournament, Xiaoyu moved to the Mishima Industrial College in Japan. Heihachi taught Panda advanced bear fighting so that she could act as a bodyguard for Xiaoyu throughout the series. It is also revealed in Tekken 8 that Panda is a skilled fashion designer and being responsible for making Xiaoyu's new outfit for this game.

Others appearances:

- Tekken Bowl App
- Tekken 3D: Prime Edition (palette swap of Kuma II)
- Tekken Card Tournament
- Galaga: TEKKEN Edition (unplayable enemy)

=== Tiger Jackson ===
- Nationality: Unknown
- Fighting style: Capoeira

Tiger Jackson (Japanese: タイガー・ジャクソン, Hepburn: Taigā Jakuson) is a palette swap of Eddy Gordo, first appearing in Tekken 3 and returned in the non-canonical Tekken Tag Tournament and in the console version of its sequel, Tekken Tag Tournament 2, now with his own character slot. With a prominent Afro and Blaxploitation design elements, Tiger Jackson was initially one of the unused names and concepts of Eddy Gordo from during the development of Tekken 3. (Gordo was also named "Rally Jackson" during development.) The character's identity is unknown, although many originally interpreted him as an alter ego of Eddy. In Tekken Tag Tournament in Eddy Gordo's ending, they both can be seen as two different people. Also the Wii U version of Tekken Tag Tournament 2, which comes with a biography for each character, implies that they are different individuals as the two are "...not at all related."

Tiger also appears in the background of the Pool Party stage of Tekken 5: Dark Resurrection. He is also a character in the game Pac-Man Fever.

== Introduced in Tekken 4 ==
=== Combot/Super Combot DX ===
- Nationality: Unknown/None
- Fighting style: Mimicry (T4), Still learning (TTT2)

Combot (Japanese: コンボット, Hepburn: Konbotto) makes his lone series appearance in Tekken 4 as a general-purpose robot created by Lee Chaolan for the fourth tournament, crafted to be the ultimate fighting machine. It is programmed to learn every fighter's style as it progresses through the tournament. It was also used to increase the chance of Lee gaining the Mishima Zaibatsu if Heihachi were to be defeated by Combot. Production of the prototype was rushed, resulting in glitches such as using only one fighting style at a time while switching through them randomly. The robot utilizes some physical attributes of other characters, such as brandishing Yoshimitsu's sword or having a long tail similar to King's.

Combot is a playable training dummy in Tekken Tag Tournament 2's "Fight Lab" tutorial. Lee (as his alter ego, Violet) completes work on Combot as part of his Super Combot DX Plan. However, Lee is caught up in the success of his handiwork that he neglects to pay attention to the robot and it explodes. He constructs a second model and then kidnaps Heihachi, Jin, and Kazuya as test subjects until Jin destroys it.

=== Craig Marduk ===
- Nationality: (Australia) Australian
- Fighting style: Vale Tudo
- Voiced by:
  David Chester (Tekken 4 - arcade and eastern PS2 versions)
  Walter Roberts (Tekken 4 - international PS2 versions)
  John Owens (Tekken 5; Tekken 6–7 (grunts))
  T. J. Storm (Tekken 6 (ending dialogue), TTT2–present; Street Fighter X Tekken (English))
  Yasuhiro Mamiya (Street Fighter X Tekken (Japanese))

Craig Marduk (クレイグ・マードック, Kureigu Mādokku) was an Australian undefeated Vale Tudo fighter for four years, but when he was involved in a minor scandal, his sponsors were glad to release him. He had been living around the world in such countries like New Zealand, Japan, Thailand, and Brazil before eventually expatriating to the United States. He was imprisoned in Arizona for accidentally killing someone during a bar fight. Marduk was suddenly released thanks to an anonymous benefactor. Upon his release he received a mysterious package containing a newspaper clipping regarding The King of Iron Fist Tournament 4 and an airline ticket. The man that Marduk killed in the bar brawl was Armor King, and Armor King's protégé, King, was the one who paid for Marduk's release, wanting him to enter the tournament in order to find him and exact revenge for killing his mentor. The two met at the tournament, where King sufficiently defeated him, leaving Marduk hospitalized. Later, King paid a visit to Marduk in the hospital to finish him off, but instead spared him after noticing a photograph showing Marduk and his family beside Marduk's bed. Enraged over his loss, Marduk began training harder than he ever had before, and managed to turn his body into the ultimate weapon. Wearing Armor King's black jaguar mask, Marduk entered a Vale Tudo tournament and challenged King after emerging undefeated.

Upon the announcement of the King of Iron Fist Tournament 5, Marduk entered, knowing King would be there, he hoped to even the score. The two fought in The King of Iron Fist Tournament 5, but victory and defeat eluded both fighters, and, in defeat, they found friendship. While returning to the waiting room, Marduk was attacked. Catching only a glimpse of the attacker's back as he fled, Marduk could have sworn he looked exactly like the man he was convicted of killing, Armor King. Determined to learn the assailant's true identity, Marduk set out with King to participate in the King of Iron Fist Tournament 6. Marduk is later seen digging up Armor King's grave when Armor King shows up behind him, Marduk asks him who he is and suddenly King shows, they question him and he replies that he is "Armor King, nothing more nothing less." Marduk finds this situation crazy as he killed him with his own hands. The other Armor King reveals that he is original Armor King's brother and Marduk killed him, he then says he will never forgive him. They fight with both ending up in hospital and King enters The King of Iron Fist Tournament 7 in order to pay for their hospital bills. As Marduk recovers first during that tournament, he was about to finish an unconscious younger Armor King, until King stops him by reminding his redemption by King, likely because King had deja vu back in the end of Tekken 4, and thus was suggested by him to write a challenge letter themed retirement match to Armor King once he is recovered, "if Marduk wins, the young Armor King must surrender his mask out of shame, unless Armor King won to finally put Marduk to retire from fighting", as the black masked wrestler accepts.

Marduk also appears in Tekken Tag Tournament 2 and Tekken 3D: Prime Edition. He also appears in the Capcom-made crossover fighting game Street Fighter X Tekken, with King as his official tag partner. His Swap Costume is modeled after Hugo, the character from Final Fight. It gives Marduk Hugo's hair, as well as Hugo's lower part of clothes with chains. According to the download blurb, while teaming up with Hugo, Marduk decided a slight wardrobe change was in order.

Others appearances:

- Tekken 3D: Prime Edition
- Street Fighter X Tekken
- Galaga: TEKKEN Edition (unplayable enemy)

=== Miharu Hirano ===
- Nationality: (Japan) Japanese
- Fighting style: Baguazhang and Piguaquan based Chinese martial arts
- Voiced by: Eriko Fujimaki (T4), Ayumi Fujimura (TTT2)

Miharu Hirano (Japanese: 平野 美晴, Hepburn: Hirano Miharu) is Ling Xiaoyu's best friend and a student of Mishima Polytechnical High School. She first appeared as a palette swap of Xiaoyu in Tekken 4, sharing her storyline, special moves, and win animations. She wears a school uniform identical to Xiaoyu's, but has short, dark red hair. Miharu was included in the console version of Tekken Tag Tournament 2 as a free update released by Namco on October 9, 2012.

=== Steve Fox ===
- Nationality: (United Kingdom) British
- Fighting style: Boxing
- Portrayed by: Luke Goss (2009 film)
- Voiced by:
  Ezra J. Stanley (TK4, Western PS2 versions)
  Jōjō Otani (TK4, Eastern PS2 versions)
  Guy Perryman (TK5 – TK7, grunts)
  Gideon Emery (TK6–present; Street Fighter X Tekken (English))
  Masaki Terasoma (Japanese dub of the 2009 live-action film)
  Yoshimasa Hosoya (Street Fighter X Tekken (Japanese))

Steve Fox (Japanese: スティーブ・フォックス, Hepburn: Sutību Fokkusu) is a British boxer whose mother is Nina Williams and aunt is Anna Williams was impregnated via in vitro fertilization by Heihachi Mishima as one of the test subjects for Doctor Abel's cryogenic sleep studies on children like Steve in an attempt to create powerful Tekken Force soldiers. Steve was adopted in his infancy by Emma Kilesen until he grew up and was secretly sent to an orphanage to hide his true identity. This led to the Super Soldier project being cancelled, and at that time Emma resigned from G Corporation. Steve is one of the survivors and has a scar on his left arm from Abel's experiment. Many years later, Steve became a middleweight boxing champion while searching for the truth about his past. Steve enters the fourth King of Iron Fist tournament, which he loses, but learns that Nina is his actual mother.

In the fifth tournament, Steve destroys Mishima Zaibatsu's research institute, but his boxing career declines due to Jin Kazama's world war. Marshall Law and Paul Phoenix invite him to train in martial arts. Steve's left arm is hurt during training, but he remembers his experiment and good memories with Emma. He finds Nina in a chapel during her private undercover mission, as she resigned from Mishima Zaibatsu after Heihachi's return and Jin's disappearance. Nina explains to Steve about her capture by Zaibatsu and warns him not to be her son. The Tekken Forces arrive, but Steve holds off them, allowing Nina to escape. Although Steve has everything he needs, yet sadden that Nina never considered him as her son, his friends, Marshall and Paul saved him from nearly fall to a depressed state, allowing him to find a new purpose for his own future. In Tekken 8, Steve and Paul join Jin Kazama's side against Kazuya Mishima's G Corporation, consisting of Nina and Marshall. Nina departs after her missions are complete, while Marshall returns to the good side after Jin's victory against Kazuya.

Steve is playable in Tekken 3D: Prime Edition, Tekken Tag Tournament 2, Tekken Revolution, and Street Fighter X Tekken. His main costumes feature the red, white and blue of the Union Jack.

British actor and musician Luke Goss played Steve in the 2009 Tekken film. His storyline from the games is changed to his being a retired fighter with no relation to Nina and instead becoming the friend and mentor of Jin Kazama after Jin defeats Marshall in the tournament. Steve is later killed by Jackhammers while breaking Jin and other imprisoned participants out of their holding cells.

In 2012, Gelo Gonzales of FHM listed Steve and Street Fighter character Balrog as one of his "10 Awesome Fantasy Fights" for Street Fighter X Tekken: "Balrog's the aggressive, in-your-face, no-nonsense Mike Tyson type. Steve, on the other hand, is a pretty boy British boxer who likes to weave around and counter at the ideal moment." Samuel Riley of GamesRadar ranked Steve fourth in his selection of the "7 baddest boxers in video games" in 2014: "Decked out in Union Jack shorts and a tasty pair of golden gloves, Steve favours punishing body strikes to the precision jab, a high stakes style that metes out as just much pain as it invites."

Others appearances:

- Tekken 3D: Prime Edition
- Street Fighter X Tekken
- Tekken Arena

== Introduced in Tekken 5 ==
=== Asuka Kazama ===
- Nationality: (Japan) Japanese
- Fighting style: Kazama Style Traditional Martial Arts
- Portrayed by: Vivian Nguyen (TTT2 "Girl Power" trailer)
- Voiced by:
  Ryoko Shiraishi (mainline games)
  G. K. Bowes (SFXT (English))
  Seiko Ueda (SFXT (Japanese))

Asuka Kazama (風間 飛鳥, Kazama Asuka) is a younger cousin of Jin Kazama, hailing from a branch family of the Kazama clan based at Osaka, where she was taught by her father, a dojo-master, ever since she was a small girl. By nature, Asuka believes very strongly in justice and devotes much of her free time to being a "pacifist" vigilante who is breaking up fights.

At the time in which the game takes place, Asuka is 17 years old and is a high school student. Asuka returned home from school one day to find that her dojo was in shambles. The students there had been beaten severely and her father was so badly hurt that he had to be taken to the hospital. In the next several days, a detective from Hong Kong, Lei Wulong, came to her and explained that the culprit would likely be entering The King of Iron Fist Tournament 5. In order to get her personal revenge and redeem her dojo, Asuka enters the tournament as well. In the tournament, Asuka managed to beat a Monegasque teenager, Lili, causing a bitter rivalry between the two (although most of the conflicts mainly start from Lili's side).

However, she was unable to find Feng Wei, and, as the tournament ended, she returned to her calm and normal life. Her life did not stay peaceful for long though, as Asuka discovered that the man responsible for the terrible war going on all over the world, Jin Kazama, is a relative. She enters The King of Iron Fist Tournament 6 in order to capture Jin. However, due to Lili constantly getting in her way, an annoyed Asuka needs to take her down first in The King of Iron Fist Tournament 7.

It also reveals that Asuka's family dojo is on the brink of financial decline until she unexpectedly gets an aid from Lili, who now owns her dojo, even after she won against the noisy Rochefort heir in the seventh tournament, much to her dismay. Although her farcical shenanigans with Lili ultimately end, by the time when the news after the seventh tournament comes to light and endangers her hometown, such as the death of Jin's grandfather and the old Mishima Zaibatsu leader, Heihachi Mishima at the hands of her said relative's father and G Corporation leader, Kazuya Mishima, whose true nature as a devil-like Jin becomes known to the public during Tekken 8.

While she, Lili, and even Jin's rival Hwoarang ultimately join Jin's side against Kazuya, Asuka finally forgives her cousin after learning the reason behind his downfall back in the sixth tournament was because of his mother's presumed death at the hands of Ogre, leaving Jin as the only known survivor of a now extinct Kazama family.

Asuka has a summer version names Summer Asuka who's introduced in Tekken Mobile. Summer Asuka has the same fighting style and the same Rage Art like Asuka.

Others appearances:

- Tekken 3D: Prime Edition
- Street Fighter X Tekken
- Tekken Card Tournament (unlockable)
- Galaga: TEKKEN Edition (unlockable)

=== Feng Wei ===
- Nationality: (China) Chinese
- Fighting style: "God Fist" Style Chinese Kenpo
- Voiced by: Hiroshi Tsuchida (grunts [TK5 - TK7]); Chuan Yin Li

Feng Wei (Japanese: 馮 威(フェン・ウェイ), Hepburn: Fen Wei; pinyin: Féng Wēi) was raised as a disciple of the God Fist style (神拳 Shinken, based on tai chi). Though he was the top student, Feng killed his master, Wu Zihao after he was scolded for fighting outside the dojo. Feng seeks the secrets of the God Fist scrolls that were stolen by the Mishima family, leading to his competing in the fifth King of Iron Fist Tournament and his destruction of Asuka Kazama's dojo in the process of his search. and he is ultimately successful in retrieving the scrolls.

It was later revealed that the scrolls did not contain any secret technique but rather an old teaching: "He who destroys all other fighting styles and makes them his own shall become a warrior superior to all men, the Dragon God." Feng then traveled all around the world and defeated many martial artists until he heard rumors of another King of Iron Fist Tournament, which persuades him to join said tournament. He was defeated by Wang Jinrei in the later stages of the tournament, despite first thinking that Feng is arrogant due him not responding when spoken to, Wang starts to respect him after he accepts defeat, and urges him to continue his training. Feng has featured regularly in the series since his Tekken 5 debut. His opponent in the during Tekken 7 originally Marshall Law, until Leroy Smith interrupts and defeats him for lacking a human heart, which Wu Zihao inherited. Deeming it as humility, Feng vows revenge towards the American Wing Chun grandmaster, and ultimately side with G Corporation, just as Leroy becoming one of the rebels.

Others appearances:

- Tekken 3D: Prime Edition
- Tekken Arena (unplayable enemy)

=== Jinpachi Mishima ===
- Nationality: (Japan) Japanese
- Fighting style: Mishima Style Fighting Karate (infused with an unidentified demonic power)
- Voiced by: Chikao Otsuka and Takeshi Aono

Jinpachi Mishima (Japanese: 三島 仁八, Hepburn: Mishima Jinpachi) was the original founder of the Mishima Zaibatsu and the father of Heihachi, father-in-law of Kazumi Mishima, paternal grandfather of Kazuya, Lars Alexandersson and Reina, adoptive paternal grandfather of Lee Chaolan, and paternal great-grandfather of Jin Kazama. Unlike most Mishima (who were ruthless and power hungry), Jinpachi was a man of honor and wisdom as he showed compassion to his grandson Kazuya when the latter was a child (this is possibly another reason Heihachi resented Jinpachi so much) and was friends with Wang Jinrei. However, Jinpachi's life took a turn for the worse when the greedy Heihachi staged a coup d'état and stole the company from him. Jinpachi attempted to retake the company when Heihachi entered the military industry (possibly sometime after the death of his daughter-in-law Kazumi Mishima during the same year), but failed and was imprisoned underneath a Mishima compound, Hon-Maru. He died due to starvation after some years. Before his debut, Jinpachi never makes an appearance, although his existence is hinted multiple times, as his friend, Wang's participation in the second tournament is motivated by Jinpachi's wish, and his gravestone is also shown in Wang's ending in Tekken 2.

In Tekken 5, having been resurrected and taken over by a demon as well as granted incredible supernatural powers, Jinpachi breaks out of Hon-Maru when the temple is destroyed during a battle between Heihachi, Kazuya and an army of Jack-4s sent to kill Heihachi in which the Jacks explode, pulverizing the Hon-Maru and freeing Jinpachi from his underground prison. With the news of Heihachi's apparent demise, Jinpachi takes over the company from behind the scenes and organizes the fifth King of Iron Fist Tournament under the orders of the demon, that told him to destroy the world and seek out the souls of the strong, even though he wanted to refuse this command, he obeyed due to lack of energy.

In the tournament finals, Jinpachi is confronted by his great-grandson, Jin who defeats him and puts him to rest at last. Though not playable, Jinpachi briefly appears in the Scenario Campaign prologue of Tekken 6, which retells the events from previous games in a comic book-style format, and he is also mentioned in the prologues and epilogues of several characters in recent mainline games, such as Jin and Wang.

He returns in Tekken Tag Tournament 2 as a playable character and as one of the Stage 7 sub-bosses, alongside Heihachi. He reprises his role as one of the unplayable Stage 7 sub-bosses in Tekken Revolution. In Street Fighter X Tekken, Dhalsim's Swap Costume is based on Jinpachi's appearance.

=== Raven ===
- Nationality: Unknown
- Fighting style: Ninjutsu
- Portrayed by: Darrin Dewitt Henson (2009 film)
- Voiced by:
  D. C. Douglas (TK5:DR–TTT2 [cutscenes and dialogue], TK8 [dialogue and grunts], Street Fighter X Tekken (English))
  Kenji Sugimura (Japanese dub of the 2009 live-action film)
  Kenichirou Matsuda (Street Fighter X Tekken (Japanese))

Raven (Japanese: レイヴン, Hepburn: Reivun) (real name unknown - is his agent name) is an international intelligence agent for United Nations who sports a distinctive X-shaped scar across his face. He enters the fifth tournament to seek out those responsible for the event, and witnesses an attack on Hon-Maru by G Corporation's Jack-4 foot soldiers while on a mission to look into the company and Mishima Zaibatsu, as the conglomerates are warring with each other. During the tournament, he crosses paths with Kazuya Mishima, who he recognizes after seeing him flying away from the Hon-Maru. He loses to Kazuya and is interrogated by him. Afterwards Kazuya discovers that he was betrayed by G Corporation, and that something was awakened from under Hon-Maru. Kazuya realizes what Heihachi has done, and speculates that, in fact, it is his grandfather Jinpachi Mishima, who is somehow controlling the Zaibatsu now. Sometime after the King of Iron Fist Tournament 5, Raven encounters Heihachi Mishima, who was presumed to be dead, they began to fight. Before a winner could be decided, Raven received orders to return to headquarters, and he had to withdraw from the battle.

After that encounter, Raven was then sent to investigate the Mishima Zaibatsu once again via the sixth tournament. Raven is a featured character in Tekken 6's "Scenario Campaign" story mode, first appearing as an enemy boss defeated by Lars Alexandersson and Alisa Bosconovitch. He later helps Alisa and Lars escape from a rampaging NANCY robot, then Lars' last journeys after Alisa was revealed to be Jin's monitor to spy on Lars. It is also revealed he is in a contact with Lars' friend Tougou, entrusted him his tag give it to Lars as a remembrance, Tougou died in battle. After Jin reveal his main reason on starting a world war, and apparently sacrifice himself to destroy Azazel, Raven and his men found Jin's comatose body, and begin to carry him to the UN via chopper.

Unfortunately during Tekken 7 event, shortly after Raven ordered his team to carry Jin's body while he return to the base to be retrained under Master Raven's orders, his men lost the boy, due to the latter's Devil Gene went haywire and took over his body, until Hwoarang defeated Jin's devil, while Lars is able to secure Jin. Once the training is complete when Heihachi's true death comes into light, he returns in Tekken 8 at the same event where Kazuya reign supreme and reveal himself as a Devil to public. While properly confirming Heihachi's permanent death to his superior, Admiral Victor Chevalier, Raven is the one who suggests to reconcile their alliance with Lars' army, Yggdrasil, and ultimately allows United Nations to clear Jin's name.

He appears with Yoshimitsu as a playable unit in Street Fighter X Tekken.

Raven was portrayed by Darrin Henson in the 2009 live-action film Tekken. He defeats Eddy Gordo in the tournament and offers advice to Jin Kazama before the latter's fight with Bryan Fury.

Others appearances:

- Tekken 3D: Prime Edition
- Street Fighter X Tekken
- Tekken Arena
- Galaga: TEKKEN Edition (unplayable enemy)

== Introduced in Tekken 5: Dark Resurrection ==
=== Emilie De Rochefort/Summer Lili ===
- Nationality: (Monaco) Monégasque
- Fighting style: Self-Taught based on Street fighting and Gymnastics
- Portrayed by: Carissa Furr (TTT2 "Girl Power" trailer)
- Voiced by:
  Joy Jacobson (Tekken 5: DR – 7 (battle grunts); Street Fighter X Tekken (English))
  Laura Blanc (Tekken Tag Tournament 2 – onwards)
  Rina Satō (Queen's Gate: Spiral Chaos)
  Asami Seto (Street Fighter X Tekken (Japanese))
  Ami Koshimizu (Digimon World Re:Digitize)

Emilie De Rochefort (エミリ・ド・ロシュフォール, Emiri Do Roshufōru), more commonly known as Lili (リリ, Riri), hails from Monaco and is the wealthy, silver-tongued daughter of a pacifist whose primarily known for oil magnate, but also does rose herbal tea productions. At the age of twelve, she was held for ransom by a group of thugs, though she managed to defeat her captors and escaped. This encounter ignited within Lili a new thrill for combat, much to her father's chagrin, as he desires her to embrace a refined and proper lifestyle. Undeterred, she uses her family's private jet to travel abroad and compete in numerous street fighting competitions. Four years later, she is invited by an unnamed individual to compete in the fifth King of Iron Fist tournament. Lili discovers, however, that the tournament is hosted by none other than the Mishima Zaibatsu, a corporation which has troubled her father in the past.

Determined to win for her father, Lili participates in the tournament, only to be defeated by Asuka Kazama, cousin of Mishima Zaibatsu CEO Jin Kazama. Lili's father learns of her dangerous escapades and confines her to the family home as punishment. However, when Mishima Zaibatsu seizes their oil fields, safe for the tea productions, Lili disregards her father's pacifist stance and enters the sixth tournament to reclaim their property. She plots to infiltrate the Mishima Zaibatsu and track down Jin, but is stopped by Lars Alexandersson and Alisa Bosconovitch. Gracious in defeat, she gifts them a sport utility vehicle, previously received as a birthday present, and requests them to defeat Jin for her.

In Tekken 7, Lili enters the seventh tournament, this time to confront Asuka. Nevertheless, she is bested once more by her rival. Tekken 8 later reveals that Lili bought ownership of Asuka's father's dojo in Osaka after learning it was facing bankruptcy, and has moved in with Asuka. At some point, Lili adopts a Siamese cat named Salt. After six months, Lili somehow stumbles into the Kazama family tree by looking into Asuka's family and learns how Jin's tragic life started, leading Lili and the rest of the heroic fighters who oppose Kazuya to join Jin's side. During the tournament, she found herself a new rivalry with a famous MMA coffee farmer Azucena over their superiority views between their drinking productions.

Lili is also selectable in the non-canon games Tekken Tag Tournament 2; the crossover title Street Fighter X Tekken with Asuka as her official tag partner; and the 2013 free-to-play game Tekken Revolution exclusive to the PlayStation 3.

Lili has a summer version names Summer Lili who's introduced in Tekken Mobile. Summer Lili has the same fighting style and the same Rage Art like Lili.

Outside of the Tekken series, Lili is selectable in the roleplaying games Queen's Gate: Spiral Chaos and Digimon World Re:Digitize, the latter as a guest character who uses her trained Numemon, Monzaemon and Lillithmon to fight other players. She is additionally the central character of Queen's Gate Lili, part of the Japan-exclusive Queen's Gate gamebook series.

Others appearances:

- Tekken 3D: Prime Edition
- Street Fighter X Tekken
- Tekken Card Tournament
- Galaga: TEKKEN Edition

=== Sergei Dragunov/Halloween Dragunov ===
- Nationality: (Russia) Russian
- Fighting style: Commando Sambo
- Portrayed by: Anton Kasabov (2009 film)
- Voiced by: Kenichi Morozumi (TK5:DR–TK7); Noriyoshi Katsunuma (2009 live-action film); Shohei Harada (TK8)

Sergei Dragunov (Japanese: セルゲイ・ドラグノフ, Hepburn: Serugei Doragunofu; Russian: Сергей Драгунов) is a Russian Spetsnaz soldier who practices Sambo and is nicknamed "White Angel of Death" (or "White Reaper" for short) due to his fighting prowess. In personal normal life, Dragunov has a hobby on building toy model kits. While investigating a mysterious body found in Siberia, Dragunov receives special orders from an unknown party supposedly regarding Devil Jin and enters the fifth tournament to carry them out, but Tekken 6 reveals that his mission is unsuccessful because he was defeated by Raven in the early stages of the tournament. As a result of the ongoing world war caused by Jin, now the new owner of the Mishima Zaibatsu, Dragunov competes in the sixth King of Iron Fist Tournament to capture Jin and bring down the organization. Because of the long grudges between his country's military regiment and United Nations, Dragunov has a long history with UN's Raven Unit, and he is the one who inflicted Raven a facial scar. Save for battle grunts, the character has no dialogue in any of his in-game appearances. Although Dragunov can speak, but only seen in most gameplay of Tekken 6 Scenario Campaign. He returns in Tekken 8, where he is allowed to live a normal life for the first time when the seventh tournament was cancelled, prior to his return in the eight tournament where Kazuya reveals himself as a devil to the world and even recruits Dragunov to join his ranks, despite Dragunov's dismay.

Dragunov has a Halloween version named Halloween Dragunov who's introduced in Tekken Mobile. Halloween Dragunov has the same fighting style and the same Rage Art like Dragunov.

Dragunov is portrayed by martial artist and actor Anton Kasabov In the 2009 live-action Tekken film, in which he has no dialogue. He participates in the Iron Fist tournament and is killed in battle by Bryan Fury.

Others appearances:

- Tekken 3D: Prime Edition

== Introduced in Tekken 6 ==
=== Azazel ===
- Nationality: Unknown/None
- Fighting style: Unknown
- Voiced by: Richard Epcar (story mode, TK6)

Azazel (Japanese: アザゼル, Hepburn: Azazeru) is the main antagonist of Tekken 6, and later an overreaching antagonist of the series. It is the originator of the Devil Gene, destined to be unleashed from its tomb following the clash of the two "evil stars" (Jin Kazama and Kazuya Mishima), as well as a long-standing enemy of both the Kazama and Mishima clans. The Hachijo clan, ancestors of Jin and Kazuya through Heihachi's wife, Kazumi, traces their lineage back to an ancient pact made with Azazel, thus implicating it in the ongoing conflicts of the Mishima family and the involvement of guest character Akuma. Azazel is the physical embodiment of the devil curse bestowed upon individuals by its influence. However, many of its servants' descendants seek to harness their devil powers for personal gain.

Azazel is a large bipedal bird-like creature with blue-gray skin, a spiked tail, and huge crystalline spikes protruding from its forearms, adorned with ceremonial attire inspired by Egyptian mythology and culture. Its offensive attacks range from summoning crystal stalagmites from the ground to unleashing scarab beetles upon his opponents. Azazel appears in the final stage of Tekken 6's story mode, brought forth by Jin to defeat and ultimately end his own life in the process. Initially believed to have been defeated by Lars Alexandersson and Raven, Jin reveals that only someone carrying the Devil Gene can permanently vanquish Azazel. Jin then unleashes his devil form, rendering him immune to Azazel's assaults, and delivers the fatal blow by driving his fist through Azazel's chest.

Despite losing its physical form, Azazel's soul remains and is sealed by Zafina into her orb, albeit at the cost of her left arm being cursed with its power. The longer its soul remains suppressed, however, the more powerful it becomes, posing the threat of its revival, unless Kazuya's impending clash with Jin is halted. In the events of Tekken 7, Zafina seeks Claudio Serafino to prevent Azazel's return. Meanwhile, Kazuya's growing tyranny strengthens Azazel's regeneration; Jin's devil remains unpurified, leading to the events of Tekken 8, wherein Zafina and her allies must aid Jin. Though Jin manages to free himself from Azazel's influence, he loses access to his Devil Gene, which has represented half of his soul since birth. Kazuya then announces the eighth King of Iron Fist Tournament to lure Zafina out, after storing enough dark energy manifested from the turmoil within the coliseum during the tournament finals to temporarily revive Azazel's physical form, later achieving his goal of absorbing Azazel's essence. After Jin successfully purifies his and Kazuya's devils and undergoes a transformation into Angel Jin, he eradicates Azazel for good. The Devil Gene, however, lives on through Heihachi's illegitimate daughter who appears to have ties with the Hachijo clan, Reina.

Azazel has garnered critical reception for his difficulty as a final boss. Lucas Sullivan of GamesRadar included him in his 2014 selection of twelve "unfair" fighting-game bosses, remarking, "Hated that mutated old guy [Tekken 5 boss Jinpachi], huh? Here, have a fire-breathing crystal dragon that's as tall as the screen." Rick Marshall of MTV noted in 2009, "As far as boss battles go, Azazel is the most difficult the franchise has ever offered—even on 'Easy' mode."

=== Miguel Caballero Rojo ===
- Nationality: (Spain) Spanish
- Fighting style: Untrained Brawling
- Portrayed by: Roger Huerta (2009 film)
- Voiced by:
  Daichi Endō (Japanese dub of the 2009 live-action film)
  Héctor Garay (TTT2–present [dialogue in TTT2 - TK7])

At the age of fifteen, Spanish brawler Miguel Caballero Rojo (Japanese: ミゲル・カバジェロ・ロホ, Hepburn: Migeru Kabajero Roho) was kicked out of the house by his parents for constantly fighting. He ran away and sought sanctuary inside a bar, where his sister, with whom he was extremely close, would visit him in secret. However, she is later killed on her wedding day after a group of Mishima Zaibatsu fighter jets launch an airstrike on the church where the ceremony was being held. Miguel's investigation leads to the sixth tournament in order to seek answers from the corporation's CEO, Jin Kazama. Unfortunately, Jin suddenly disappeared, Miguel's life purpose to kill him also disappears. From that point forward, Miguel began to wander like a living specter from battle-torn town to another. Until one day, he is confronted by now ex-Zaibatsu leader Jin, with Miguel's purpose to kill him rise again. However, Jin held back and let Miguel finish, but Miguel refuse and spared, telling Jin that he will kill him once Jin has found hope without dying earlier yet. His early appearances resemble that of a bullfighter, but his design was simplified in Tekken 7 to an open red shirt and green combat trousers. He has no formal training in the martial arts, a power type whose fighting style is brawling-based street fighting. In Tekken 7, Miguel's 'Rage art' is somewhat unique in that the camera switches to a first person perspective from the opponents point of view, giving Miguel's violent beat down a particularly brutal feel.

Miguel has a minor role in the 2009 Tekken live-action film, and was played by Roger Huerta. He is defeated in the tournament by Jin.

Others appearances:

- Tekken 3D: Prime Edition

=== NANCY-MI847J ===
- Nationality: (Japan) Japanese, but not a citizen
- Voiced by: None

NANCY-MI847J is a massive robotic security unit under the command of Jin Kazama. It is very difficult to destroy and possesses an arsenal of missiles and lasers. NANCY only appears in Tekken 6's arcade mode and "Time Attack" Mode as a bonus round battle before the player fights Jin. In the story mode, the robot is controllable in one level when the player attempts infiltration of G Corporation's headquarters. NANCY is the very first character that utilizes Wall Bound, which soon applied in Tekken 7, starting from guest character Geese Howard in Season 1, then all characters as of Season 2.

Steve West of CinemaBlend said about the character's fighting style: "NANCY doesn't react like a typical Tekken opponent. Rather than block your puny attempts to damage it, the robot will simply attack you whenever it feels like it." Dale North of Destructoid commented in 2008: "Where do [Namco] get these [character] names? Bob and Nancy? That sounds like a Middle-American suburban couple."

The "MI847J" in NANCY'S name stands for the following: MI for Mishima Industrie, 847 is the model number and the "J" for Japan.

=== Zafina ===
- Nationality: Unknown, alluded to be Egypt but not confirmed
- Fighting style: Ancient Assassination Arts
- Voiced by: Cindy Robinson

Zafina (Japanese: ザフィーナ, Hepburn: Zafīna) (زافينا) is a Middle Eastern woman who is likely of Egyptian descent. Born into an ancient bloodline of evil-dispellers, she possesses spiritual powers and was raised to be a warrior of her clan. Zafina guards a sealed royal tomb that is said to keep her clan prosperous and has successfully thwarted all infiltration attempts. She prophesies the clash of two "evil stars" — Jin Kazama and Kazuya Mishima — that would spell the end of the world. Thus, Zafina sets out for the Far East, where Jin and Kazuya are to meet. In Tekken 6's "Scenario Campaign" story mode, Zafina allies herself with Lars Alexandersson and Raven against the Tekken Force, and gives them the location of Azazel's Temple. Zafina also uses her spiritual gifts as an astrologist in addition to her primary duties.

In Tekken 7, Zafina dons a new design and has gained possession of Azazel's Orb (as seen in Devil Jin's Tekken 6 ending), granting her demonic powers. She seeks Claudio Serafino to help suppress the seal on Azazel's essence to prevent its return. Upon arriving at Duomo di Sirio, however, Zafina collapses in front of Claudio and Ling Xiaoyu, who tend to her and reinforce the seal on Azazel. In Tekken 8, Zafina and her allies must aid Jin not only in defeating Kazuya but also in purifying his dormant devil and rebirthing as a "star of hope". Kazuya later initiates the eighth tournament in Italy to lure Zafina out and absorb Azazel's essence. Kazuya achieves his goal, and before Zafina loses consciousness and is safely escorted, she advises Jin to return to Yakushima to purify his and Kazuya's devils and eradicate Azazel for good. Following the defeats of both Kazuya and Azazel, Zafina recovers and returns to the Middle East, where she is visited by Claudio.

Others appearances:

- Tekken 3D: Prime Edition

== Introduced in Tekken 6: Bloodline Rebellion ==
=== Alisa Bosconovitch ===
- Nationality: (Russia) Russian, but not a citizen
- Fighting style: High Mobility Combat with Unique Thruster
- Portrayed by: Michelle Ballee (TTT2 "Girl Power" trailer)
  Amandine Desprez (TTT2 live-action film)
- Voiced by:
  Yuki Matsuoka (most games; Tekken: Blood Vengeance (Japanese), SFXT (Japanese))
  Cristina Vee (Tekken: Blood Vengeance (English))
  Michele Knotz (SFXT (English))

Alisa Bosconovitch (Japanese: アリサ・ボスコノビッチ, Hepburn: Arisa Bosukanobitchi) was created to protect Jin Kazama and serves him through her travels. Alisa is placed in a starring role in the console-only Scenario Campaign mode in Tekken 6. After being activated following a botched raid on a Mishima Zaibatsu lab, she joins Lars Alexandersson in his pursuit of his lost memories (which occur as a result of the events at the lab). She is controlled by the CPU in this mode (unless the player chooses to play as Alisa herself, at which point CPU control is given to Lars). Alisa helps Lars (or whoever the player has chosen to use in Scenario Campaign) battle the waves of enemies and has an AI system that grows as she participates in battle. She keeps a journal which she constantly updates with entries regarding the events of her journey with Lars, as well as her own personal opinion about them. It is later revealed that she is actually an android in the employ of Jin, to which she has been serving as a way for Jin to observe what has been happening in the world at large. She is commanded by Jin to disable safe mode (including her personality and behavior inhibition programming) and attack Lars. After a stalemate battle with Lars, she leaves for the desert to join Jin. When Lars arrives, she attacks him again where this time she is ultimately defeated and shuts down. Lars rescues her body and takes her to a robotics corporation (run by Lee Chaolan) where she can be revived and has the inhibitor programed removed. Although the scenario campaign was removed from PlayStation Portable's port, the developers added background information for the character.

In Tekken 7, though Lee managed to fully repair her and remove the inhibitor program, Alisa suffers a memory loss and attacks him in self-defense upon rebooting. Upon losing, Alisa remembers who Lee is, though questions why she is at Violet Systems. Lee then uses his technology to restore Alisa's memory, which then gives her the desire to find Lars. Before Lee can take her to Lars though, Violet Systems is attacked by the Tekken Force. Lee and Alisa fight them off and flee to another of Lee's facilities, where Lars had been waiting. Alisa happily jumps on Lars in excitement, though the Tekken Force attack again, searching for Jin's body. Alisa assists Lars and Lee in fighting off the Tekken force but Alisa is stopped by Nina Williams who stalls Alisa long enough for a Tekken Force helicopter to capture Jin. However, it turns out that Alisa takes part of Lee's plan to distract Nina and Tekken Force and trap them inside the now evacuated Yggdrasil base, thought Nina survive the explosion and decide to let Jin go with Yggdrasil, where will be fully recovered. Following Heihachi's ultimate death at the hands of Kazuya, who now publicly reveals himself as a devil like Jin, Alisa analyzes the worst outcome, as G Corporation begin their world war mongering regime in Tekken 8. During said eighth game, six months later, now a captain of Yggdrasil, she finally reunites with her "father" and creator, Dr. Bosconovitch, who is with his acquaintance, the Manji Clan leader Yoshimitsu to join the rebellion via Violet Systems, and already made a decision to let his "daughter" go with free will. A week after Jin unable to access his devil's power at will from his recent fight against Kazuya in New York, Alisa is enlisted to keep an eye on Jin's condition and originally going to be assigned to replace his participation at the tournament qualification, before honoring Jin's wish to participate. After gaining alliances from UN, Sirius and other tournament fighters who opposes Kazuya, Alisa serves as a navigator, while participating a war against G Corporation at Yakushima.

Other than the main games of the series, Alisa also appears in the portable game Tekken 3D: Prime Edition as well as the non-canon Tekken Tag Tournament 2, in which her ending (as well as other character's) reinforces her friendship with Ling Xiaoyu first shown in the animated CGI film Tekken: Blood Vengeance. Outside of the Tekken series, she is a playable character in Street Fighter X Tekken as downloadable content, alongside her official tag partner, Lars. She appears as an assist unit in Project X Zone, alongside fellow Tekken characters Jin, Xiaoyu, and a younger Heihachi Mishima. She appears as an unlockable character in the free-to-play game, Tekken Revolution.

Alisa appears as one of the main characters in the 2011 CGI film Tekken: Blood Vengeance. She is a student in the Kyoto International School and befriends Ling Xiaoyu but hides the fact that she is a robot. She acts upon the orders of Jin to find Shin Kamiya along with Xiaoyu under the forced orders of Anna Williams. After Xiaoyu saves her from an ambush attack from Anna, she joins Xiaoyu in finding the truth about the M-cell experiments done on Shin. Throughout the film, she starts to develop a sense of humanity in which she would often hesitate even under her normal protocol commands and her fondness with her friendship with Xiaoyu. During the final battle between Heihachi Mishima and Devil Jin, a severely damaged Alisa sacrifices herself by distracting Heihachi with a blast allowing Jin to defeat him. In the end Jin reverses her standby mode and end credits show her fully restored and discussing how she and Xiaoyu should enter the Tekken tournament. Alisa appears in the Tekken Tag Tournament 2 live-action short film portrayed by Amandine Desprez.

Alisa appears in Tekken Comic, a manga based on Tekken 6. A live-action Alisa, portrayed by Michelle Ballee, also appears in the Tekken Tag Tournament 2 Girl Power Trailer, shown at Comic-Con in 2012. In 2012, Kotobukiya released an Alisa Bosconovitch action figure as part of their Tekken Tag Tournament 2 toyline.

1UP.com commented that Alisa is sexy, cute and has a bubbly personality and stated that she is "the coolest new Tekken character to emerge in years," praising her chainsaws and head bomb. In 2012, she was listed as one of the most "ridiculous" Tekken characters by Game Informer, who said "Why is a stupid robot fairy in a fighting game? I don't think even Namco Bandai knows the answer to that".

Others appearances:

- Tekken 3D: Prime Edition
- Street Fighter X Tekken (paid DLC, except in PlayStation Vita)
- Galaga: TEKKEN Edition (unplayable enemy)

== Introduced in Tekken Tag Tournament 2 ==
=== Sebastian ===
- Nationality: (Monaco) Monégasque
- Fighting style: Self-Taught (based on Lili's fighting style)
- Voiced by:
  Serge Bourrier (TTT2)
  Hirohiko Kakegawa (Digimon World Re:Digitize)

Sebastian (セバスチャン, Sebasuchan) is Lili's butler who made his debut as a playable character in Tekken Tag Tournament 2 as part of a free update on October 9, 2012. He previously appeared as an unplayable character in Lili's Tekken 5: Dark Resurrection and Tekken 6 endings. Sebastian also appears alongside Lili in the game Digimon World Re:Digitize with his trained Angemon.

Sebastian utilizes Lili's moveset, sharing many of her moves including the ones from Tekken 5: Dark Resurrection that were removed in the current releases.

== Introduced in Tekken Revolution ==
=== Eliza ===
- Nationality: Unknown

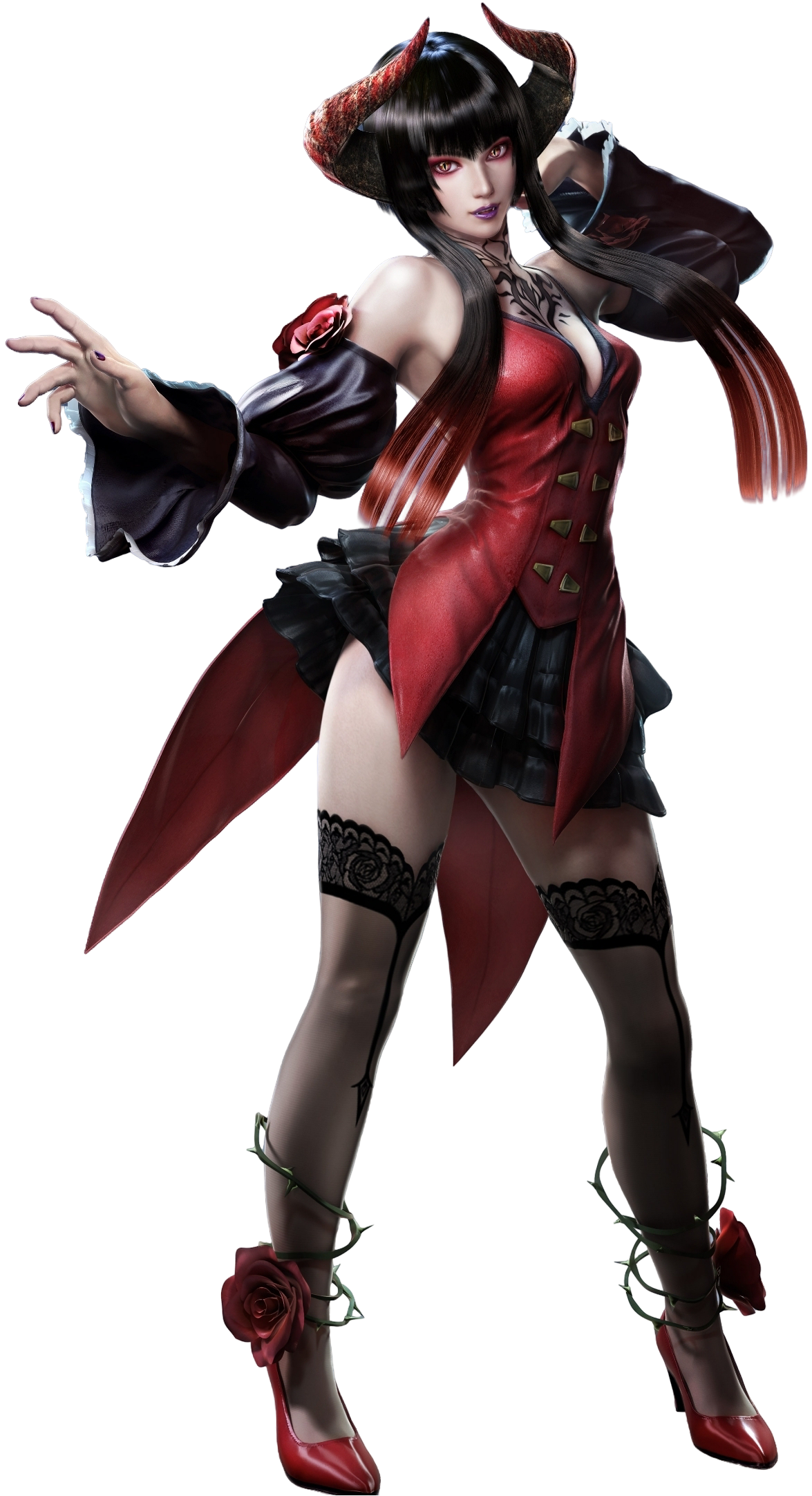
Eliza in Tekken 7

- Fighting style: Unknown
- Voiced by:
- Caitlin Glass

Eliza (エリザ, Eriza) is a vampire who made her debut in the free-to-play spin-off Tekken Revolution. She was one of the ten character choices in a poll to determine the new character addition for the game; she was eventually voted number one most wanted character, ahead of Sexy Tekken Force Member and Shin Kamiya at San Diego Comic-Con in 2013, ensuring her inclusion to the game. According to her backstory, Eliza is a powerful and immortal vampire who had existed since more than 1000 years ago. One day after escaping from one of the members of ancient time's Sirius organization, whom Claudio Serafino descendant to, with the intention of taking a nap inside her coffin, she accidentally fell into a deep sleep for hundreds of years. In present-day Monaco, the Rochefort family built a mansion above her coffin, thus imprisoning her, which was also meant for her shelter from being chased by each descendant of the ancient time's Sirius members. She eventually woke up and managed to escape recently and plan an exact revenge on the present day Sirius organization. Eliza still has difficulty in controlling her sleep and will fall asleep even in the middle of fights; however, she can potentially recover her health while doing so.

Tekken 7 is her main series playable debut, where she utilizes a similar playstyle to Akuma from Street Fighter, such as having 2D-area fighting game mechanics like jumping attacks and special cancels, and Street Fighter-styled Super meter, referred to as a "Blood" gauge. Her sleeping mechanic has also been reworked, allowing her to build her "Blood" gauge rather than recovering health.

Eliza's fighting style incorporates several supernatural moves (such as teleportation). She can also shoot a grounded energy wave that goes straight, although unlike Jinpachi's fireball, it is blockable.

== Introduced in Tekken 7 ==
=== Claudio Serafino ===
- Nationality: (Italy) Italian
- Fighting style: Sirius-Style Exorcism Sorcery
- Voiced by:
  Diego Baldoin (mainline games)
  Kohsuke Toriumi (Pachi-Slot T4)

Claudio Serafino (Japanese: クラウディオ・セラフィーノ, Hepburn: Kuraudio Serafīno) is a white-clad man hailing from Italy. He is a leader of a secret Anti-Devil organization in combating the Devil Gene's threat, known as Archers of Sirius. Empowered with his family's Sirius magic, the Starburst, he has tattoos around his left eye and black tapes covering his right arm, which can project and shoot blue flame-based spells during battles and serves as a limiter to unleash his power's full potential like additional yellow flame, at cost of half of his lifeforce. He was one of the playable characters in the first location tests of Tekken 7. During an interview with Harada, it was said that Claudio was created to counter the Devil Gene's reign, thus would play an important role in the game.

The reason behind his organization's secret from the public and a sudden disclosure is not yet known at this point. Some time later, Claudio's organization was approached by the Mishima Zaibatsu, led by Heihachi Mishima, to join their conglomerate. However, the archers refused and the Mishima Zaibatsu continues to attempt to persuade them. Having noticed some suspicious acts by Heihachi and his Zaibatsu, Claudio was prompted to investigate the reasons behind the Mishima Zaibatsu's persuasion, even though his uneasy service with Heihachi is temporary, which ultimately cause him to lose his followers. During his alliance with the Mishima Zaibatsu, he met Ling Xiaoyu. After learning about her connection to Jin Kazama, Claudio initially planned to use her as bait to capture Jin, but ultimately change his mind at her behest, now with a sole aim on the greatest threat, Kazuya, and would have no choice to kill Jin if the latter completely succumb to his Devil half. He later gains assistance from a fortune teller, Zafina, who is currently cursed by an orb of a fully weakened Azazel, in order to prevent the monster's full return through stopping a continued war between Jin and particularly Kazuya after the latter killed Heihachi in their last fight.

Claudio returns as a playable character in Tekken 8, where he and his team consists Zafina, Xiaoyu and her pet, Panda joins Jin's hero side against G Corporation's tyranny, after learning Jin's true intention from Zafina. While Claudio and his allies are too late to learn that Kazuya set up the tournament to ambush Zafina and absorb Azazel from her to become a true Devil, Claudio leads a distraction team of fighters to temporarily weaken Kazuya at cost of his own live, to ensure Jin return to Yakushima, and purify his devil and reborn as an angel of hope.

Others appearances:

- Galaga: TEKKEN Edition

=== Gigas ===
- Nationality: Unknown
- Fighting style: Destructive Impulse

Gigas (ギガース, Gigāsu) (real name unknown) is a hulking, red-skinned humanoid who appears to have cybernetics attached to his otherwise nude body. He was one of the characters whose existence was leaked before being officially revealed as the second new character added post-launch of Tekken 7. Gigas was revealed to be created by a research team in the development of biotechnological weapons. Gigas was sent in the tournament to tests his fighting capabilities. It is hinted in both his own and Katarina's endings that he might be Katarina Alves' adoptive father, who is kidnapped by G Corp and mutated into Gigas.

=== Katarina Alves ===
- Nationality: (Brazil) Brazilian
- Fighting style: Savate
- Voiced by: Thaís Durães

Katarina Alves (カタリーナ・アウヴェス, Katarīna Auvesu) is a Brazilian woman who practices the art of savate. She is described as a "sassy, mouthed talker", as well as a beginner-friendly character, with simple strings to execute combos. Along with Claudio, she is one of the characters available in the first location tests of Tekken 7.

She is currently searching for her missing adoptive father, who happens to be G Corporation's brainwashed monster known as Gigas, as seen on her and Gigas' ending.

Katarina seems to be very confident in her abilities as a fighter; alongside her cocky attitude, her fighting pose has her guard totally lowered (contrary to a traditional savate stance), and her posture is completely relaxed.

=== Kazumi Mishima/Devil Kazumi ===
- Nationality: (Japan) Japanese
- Fighting style: Hachijo Style Karate mixed with Mishima Style Karate
- Voiced by: Yumi Hara

Kazumi Mishima (三島 一美, Mishima Kazumi), née Hachijo (八条), is married to Heihachi and the mother of Kazuya, the adoptive mother of Lee Chaolan, the daughter-in-law of Jinpachi Mishima, and also the paternal grandmother of Jin Kazama. She serves as the final boss in the arcade mode of Tekken 7, but was eventually replaced with Akuma when certain conditions have been met. Before Tekken 7, she was only alluded to twice: once in Heihachi's stage in Tekken 2, in which her and Heihachi's names are written on the floorboard of the temple in the style of Aiaigasa (a romantic expression to show love between couples), as well as in the non-canon OVA Tekken: The Motion Picture, in which she is mentioned to have died shortly after giving birth to Kazuya. She is seen in a photo inside a locket, cradling baby Kazuya. The debut trailer of Tekken 7 features Kazumi appearing in person for the first time, with her and Heihachi's Aiaigasa-stylized name also shown. Her human form became playable when she became the seventh time-release character added to Tekken 7. Her devil form, however, remains unplayable, except with a cheat; the opponent Kazumi will be in her human form, and the fight will be over after only one round, even when players change the number of rounds in the game's options.

Kazumi's fighting style is Hachijo Style Karate, which is very similar to the Mishima Style Karate as practiced by the rest of her family, with additional tiger-summoning and levitating ability akin to Jinpachi Mishima. As a final boss, Kazumi is fought in two phases; upon beating her once, she transforms into a stronger phoenix-like white Devil form and remains that way for the duration of the stage. In her devil form, besides having the original devil's powers of third eyed Devil Blaster and wings, her tiger-summoning ability is enhanced, and the tiger's color itself changes to white. Upon beating her once as Devil Kazumi, rather than transforming into a stronger white Devil form, she fights back randomly.

In the story, Kazumi first meets Heihachi when she visits Jinpachi's dojo to train with him. Both Heihachi and Kazumi come closer and eventually marry, with Kazumi giving birth to Kazuya. Five years later, Kazumi suddenly gets sick; her illness passes quickly, but Kazumi begins behaving differently, exhibiting signs of a split personality, likely due to the awakening of her Devil Gene. During this time, Kazumi saves Akuma's life. After he recovers, Kazumi asks Akuma to find and kill Heihachi and Kazuya. Akuma agrees, claiming that this will settle the debt that he owes Kazumi. Many days later, Kazumi suddenly attempts to kill Heihachi, revealing that the reason she married him is because her clan foresaw his attempted world domination in the future and sent her to kill him. However, Heihachi proves stronger and, realizing the woman he loved is gone, regretfully kills her in an act of self-defense.

It is revealed in Tekken 8 that the Hachijo is a descendant clan of Azazel's servants, having been entrusted to make a false prophecy of Mishima clan's downfall through Heihachi, then later Kazuya to be fulfilled and ensured Azazel's terror reign supreme by sending Kazumi to accomplish her machinations. However, six months Heihachi's death at the hands of Kazuya in Tekken 7, Kazumi's grandson Jin Kazama, whose plan revealed in Tekken 6 to destroy Azazel and the Devil Gene has completed his purification of his devil self and reborn as an angel of hope decimated Kazuya's Devil Gene and Azazel out of existence, and defeated Kazuya, thus averting Kazumi's machinations that first occurred in almost two decades. However, Jin's victorious to restore world peace is only a beginning when Reina, Heihachi's illegitimate daughter is revealed to be a Devil Gene user, who let herself be killed by True Devil Kazuya in a crossfire to properly awaken her dormant devil. The Story DLC archives explain that the Hachijo escaped Azazel's rule before his and the rest of the followers' downfall. Heihachi would kill all of the Hachijo after their failed assassination attempt, save for a baby girl whom Heihachi spared.

=== Lucky Chloe ===
- Nationality: Unknown, someone from the West
- Fighting style: Freestyle Dance
- Voiced by: Hisako Kanemoto

Lucky Chloe (ラッキークロエ, Rakkīkuroe) was designed by Yūsuke Kozaki. The character's revelation drew complaints from forums such as NeoGAF, with some going so far as to ask director Katsuhiro Harada to remove the character from the game. Others, meanwhile, called out the character for being a fish out-of water conception or drew comparisons with characters from other fighting game series, Harada tweeted that he would consider making Chloe exclusive for the Asian and European versions and make a well-muscled skinhead for the North American market; though the tweet was later clarified as a joke, as several game outlets apparently took the comment seriously.

Lucky Chloe is a J-pop sensation, devoted otaku and the face of the G Corporation brand. When Eddy Gordo burst into G Corp and took out guard after guard, Chloe fearlessly challenged him: fight her, and if he loses he will have to work as her backup dancer. Without caring if he had accepted the conditions or not, she prepared for battle, and enters the King of Iron Fist Tournament 7. The tournament veteran, Interpol's detective Lei Wulong happens to be her fan.

Lucky Chloe's fighting style is Freestyle Dance. According to the German edition GamePro, "Chloe kills the life energy of her opponents with her nimble Mids and Lows bit by bit - a comparatively aggressive character, whose fighting style meets her cat costume."

Others appearances:

- Galaga: TEKKEN Edition (unlockable)

== Introduced in Tekken 7: Fated Retribution ==
=== Fahkumram ===
- Nationality: (Thailand) Thai
- Fighting style: Muay Thai
- Voiced by: Aphichat Samutsiri (Thai: อภิชาติ สมุทคีรี)

Fahkumram (ファーカムラム, Fākamuramu, Thai: ฟ้าคำราม) (real name unknown - is his ring name) is a very tall, tattooed, strong, and muscular man from Thailand. He is a legendary Muay Thai champion and the national hero of Thailand. The scars he received were a result of being stricken by lightning at age 12, with Fahkumram somehow surviving and obtaining superhuman abilities, as well as growing over two meters tall. He eventually becomes a champion at the age of 18 and grows into an honorable family man who cares for his family, including his daughter who looks up to him. Unfortunately, at the age of 24, his life was to take a dramatic turn for the worse. Corrupt officials attempt to lure and use Fahkumram as a slave for their illegal activities, even taking his family hostage after Fahkumram is falsely arrested for defending himself against and killing his would-be assassins (who also rigged his last official match). These events cause him to become more cynical and deluded by his country's corruption. When the war between the Mishima Zaibatsu and G Corporation occurs four years later, the corrupt government dispatches Fahkumram primarily to eliminate the Zaibatsu by enlisting him for the seventh King of Iron Fist Tournament; Fahkumram hopes to use this as an opportunity to save his family, he should win liberty once and for all. Although his family are still safe when the seventh tournament is cancelled since the disappearance of its sponsor, Heihachi Mishima, to Fahkumram's dismay, the Thai government had been taking bribery from one of Heihachi's loyal remnants the entire time, using Heihachi's pet, Kuma to represent Southeast/Oceania represented finalist than Fahkumram during the eighth tournament held by G Corporation, with the Muay Thai fighter himself is instead being deployed to the battlefield.

=== Leroy Smith ===
- Nationality: (United States) American
- Fighting style: Wing Chun
- Voiced by:
  Beau Billingslea (main games)
  Yasuhiro Kikuchi (Tekken: Bloodline (Japanese))
  Krizz Kaliko (Tekken: Bloodline (English))

Leroy Smith (リロイ・スミス, Riroi Sumisu) is an African-American martial artist from Manhattan Island of New York City. During his childhood, escalating gang violence leads to the Big Apple War, a massive battle between rival gangs that results in many civilian casualties, including Leroy's family. Leroy is also injured in the conflict, falling into a river and being washed out to sea before being found by a merchant ship. With nowhere to return to, Leroy travels the world as a trader before settling in Hong Kong to learn the Wing Chun martial art and also met Ling Xiaoyu when she was little. Nearly a half-century later, Leroy returns to New York to take revenge on the gangsters and the Mishima Zaibatsu, whom he learns were responsible for the events leading to the Big Apple War. He also has a pet pit-bull dog named "Sugar", that can assist Leroy in his battles.

The Game Award 2022 trailer of Tekken 8 reveals that Leroy became Manhattan's historical figure at some point, with his statue is seen in the game's Midtown's Time Square stage, in additions to have becoming a head of his branding company, such as his own coffee shop and sponsoring Ortiz family's coffee farming company. Leroy himself eventually revealed in EVO Japan 2023 to have return playable in this game. Although Heihachi suddenly disappeared, but unbeknownst that his enemy's son, Kazuya permanently killed him, Leroy's peaceful day is far from over, when Kazuya publicly reveals himself as a devil to the world. Leroy also joined the seventh tournament where he defeated a rogue kung fu fighter, Feng Wei, who murdered his own master who happened to be the former's old friend, Wu Zihao. Upon learning that Feng becoming one of Kazuya's henchman, Leroy must settle score against him while joining Jin's heroes side, his opponent during the last quarter finals of the eight tournament. Leroy is also grateful of Jin's heroism against Kazuya's attack at Manhattan, which Leroy previously liberated, and becoming his main reason to join his side along with other heroic fighters against Kazuya's army in return.

Leroy appears in Season 1 of non-canon retold animated series Tekken: Bloodline, where he participated Tekken 3 tournament. Unlike in the games, he initially hostile towards Jin because he is Heihachi's heir. During the fight, Jin unintentionally injured Leroy's knee during their match, which also led him to gain a cane he used as a temporary weapon in the game's main story. Following the match, Leroy also warns Jin about Heihachi's true purpose like how it affects Kazuya, similar warning which Jin heard from a tournament veteran, Paul about who Kazuya was like.

=== Lidia Sobieska ===
- Nationality: (Poland) Polish
- Fighting style: Polskie Style Traditional Karate
- Voiced by: Aleksandra Nowicka (Tekken 7)

Lidia Sobieska (リディア ソビエスカ, Ridiya Sobiesuka) is a Polish karateka who became prime minister at young age. She was first announced at Japan Fighting Game Publishers Roundtable 2, 2021 as both second and last fighter of Tekken 7 Season 4.

She is an old friend of Eddy Gordo who she has not seen him for ten years since the incident caused Eddy's tragic life begin in Tekken 3. Lidia's grandfather was once the prime minister of their country before her. The reason she became her grandfather's successor at a young age immediately, is because her father was killed in a helicopter crash in which someone attempted an assassination on her grandfather, this being the main reason she entered the political world. Due to having had spent too long with martial arts prior to entering the political world, she sometimes slips into speaking like she is in the dojo whilst on the phone with her aide during her political career. After receiving a letter from Heihachi, but knowing he would be planning a hostile takeover on her country, she enters The King of Iron Fist tournament to defend her people. However, as the seventh tournament's cancellation and Heihachi's true death at the hands of Kazuya, his existence as an oppressor who wields the devil's power threatens Lidia's country and other nations even more, causing her to re-enter the King of Iron Fist once again, while also enlists Manji Clan to rescue Eddy, and help their fellow allies to oppose Kazuya in Tekken 8.

=== Master Raven ===
- Nationality: Unknown
- Fighting style: Ninjutsu
- Voiced by: Sorcha Chisholm

Master Raven (マスターレイヴン, Masutā Reivun) (real name unknown - is her agent name) is a female superior of the original Raven, who debuted in Tekken 7: Fated Retribution through time release. In a battle, she carries a sword similar to Yoshimitsu.

== Introduced in Tekken Mobile ==
=== Bo Montana ===
- Nationality: (United States) American
- Fighting style: Unknown

Bo Montana (ボー ロデオ モンタナ, Bō "Rodeo" Montana), better known as Rodeo , is an all-American fighter. He was a star athlete in college, captain of the football team, and a military soldier with a flawless combat record. While in the army, his squad was ambushed by Revenant, leaving them with their "life force" stripped. He soon becomes a fighter to exact revenge on Revenant, and in turn, restore his comrades lives.

=== Isaak ===
- Nationality: Unknown
- Fighting style: Unknown

Isaak (イサク, Isaku) is a free-to-play character introduced in Tekken Mobile. His nationality and fighting style are unspecified. He has short blonde hair, wears a jacket with lightly shredded jeans.

=== Revenant ===
- Nationality: Unknown
- Fighting style: Unknown

Revenant (レヴナント, Revunanto) is the antagonist of Tekken Mobile. He is a paranormal being masked in heavy gear, and comes from an unknown country. He is an enemy of Kazuya, and mimics his fighting style.

=== Ruby ===
- Nationality: Unknown
- Fighting style: Unknown

Ruby (ルビー, Rubī) is a female biker who has a fighting style similar to Paul Phoenix as well as his fighting stance.

=== Tiger Miyagi ===
- Nationality: Unknown
- Fighting style: Karate

Tiger Miyagi (タイガー宮城, Taigā Miyagi) is a karate fighter from an unknown country. His first outfit has him with plaited long black hair, while his second outfit gives him very short hair.

=== Yue ===
- Nationality: Unknown
- Fighting style: Unknown

Yue (ユエ) is a female look like Asian fighter who practices generic martial arts. She heavily resembles Pai Chan, a playable character in fighting game series Virtua Fighter.

== Introduced in Tekken 8 ==
=== Azucena Milagros Ortiz Castillo ===
- Nationality: (Peru) Peruvian
- Fighting style: Mixed Martial Arts based on Rumi Maki/Strike Boxing
- Voiced by: Marisa Contreras

Azucena Milagros Ortiz Castillo (アズセナ・ミラグロス・オルティス・カスティーリョ, Azusena Miragurosu Orutisu Kasutīryo) is a famous, fearless, and happy-go-lucky mixed martial artist and barista, the only daughter of a family who owns a coffee company named "Ortiz Farm", based at a farming location where she receives a supernatural power. Her family company presumably originally business partners with Leroy Smith's branding company, until they briefly switch side with G Corporation, just for pure business matter. Her love for coffee also clashes with Lili's love for tea, but earns her respect towards a fellow coffee lover, Leo Kliesen, despite the latter's dismay on the former for siding with Kazuya. Although she, as well as Marshall Law, who too being deceived by Kazuya Mishima to join his tyranny, has finally return to the side of good, following Jin Kazama's victory. She is the first new character in the eighth game to be revealed in EVO 2023.

=== Reina ===
- Nationality: Unknown
- Fighting style: Taidō and Mishima Style Fighting Karate (officially listed as Unknown)
- Voiced by: Asami Seto, Kate Clarke (FF: COTW (English))

Reina (麗奈) is a mysterious young punk school girl clad in purple from an unspecific country, with mysterious connections to not only the Mishima clan, but also suspected to be a Devil Gene user, due to having a malevolent aura and red eyes that are shown in her Rage Art similar in particular to Heihachi Mishima. She attends the same school as Xiaoyu, Jin, Miharu and the second Kunimitsu, and is confirmed to be younger than Jin. Due to her mysterious presence, none of the surviving members are aware of her existence until in Tekken 8, where she joins Jin's heroes side for unknown purposes against Kazuya. During the story and its mid credits, it is revealed that not only Reina is a Devil Gene user like Jin and Kazuya, but also has a connection with the now extinct Hachijo, with a sole survivor whom Heihachi spared from his massacre on the clan might be related to Reina's existence. Though she loved and respected him enough to follow in his footsteps, she is unaware of her "father"'s distaste towards Devil Gene users and other similar demons, and has been planning to use her for his schemes. Ever since learning she has a Devil Gene as Jin and Kazuya at some point, Reina's first mission during the eighth King of Iron Fist tournament is to earn Jin and his allies' trust and use them to get close to Kazuya and let herself be killed by him, in order to fully awaken her dormant Devil Gene powers without everyone's notice. She is also responsible for leaking Kazuya's attack on New York to Jin's allies, while searching for her "father"'s exact whereabout, suspecting that a mysterious group of Tekken Monks saved him from his last fight against Kazuya and hide him from the public eye. Once she achieved her first goal, Reina begins her next scheme of avenging Heihachi's presumed death and continuing his legacy, after Jin defeated Kazuya, and purged both of their Devil Genes and Azazel's existence, where the latter's unconscious body is picked up by a seemingly alive Jun. Though she is unaware that her "father" survived and temporarily suffered an amnesia before regain his memories back and betray the Monks.

She was revealed in EVO Tekken 8 Showcase 2023 on November 12, 2023.

=== Victor Chevalier ===
- Nationality: (France) French
- Fighting Style: Super Spy Close Quarter Battle (based on Ninjutsu and Ko-ryū)
- Voiced by: Vincent Cassel

Victor Chevalier (ヴィクター・シュバリエ, Vikutā Shubarie) is a legendary Admiral-ranked elderly war veteran and United Nations' super spy from royal French knight lineage, and the founding grandmaster of Raven Unit. He is a close quarter battler who wields both a knife and karambit, and technology which allows him to use teleportation, and enhance his pistol, grenades, and a sheathed katana, Takemikazuchi.

Descended from a lineage of distinguished knights, Victor has dreamed of rescuing those in need ever since he was a boy. Following in the footsteps of his father, a high-ranking naval officer, Victor enlists in the French Navy. Viewed as riding the coattails of his successful father by jealous peers, Victor was sent into dangerous operating zones again and again. Still, thanks to the time he spent diligently training with his father's mercenary friend from the East, particularly Japan, Victor is able to use his knowledge of combat to come back from every mission alive and victorious. Famous for his penny-pinching nature and the long list of broken hearts he has left in his wake, Victor leaves a trail of rumors and stories wherever he goes. Before he knows it, Victor earns himself the codename "Phantom Raven", and is looked upon with both fear and awe by others in the military. Victor leaves the Navy to join the UN, hoping to find a way to help even more people as well as explore new paths outside the constraints of working for the state.

In preparation for the coming upheaval, Victor exhausts all the means of negotiation he has available to him and succeeds in founding armed forces that have the authority to act at their own discretion. He directs the Raven Unit—an elite team he trained himself—to conduct special ops all over the world while in the meantime, he takes up the mantle as leader of the UN forces. Time passes, and the flames of G Corp's brutal military invasion have begun to engulf the world. Having foreseen such a future, Victor takes command of his new forces and readies himself for the fight. Armed with an haute couture suit from an established design house and the latest optical weapons, Victor, the living legend, retakes his place on the battlefield. Initially, the UN attempt to capture Jin for his crime back in Tekken 6, and briefly fighting Yggdrasil over Jin's custody, which the rebels managed to secure and caretake him in Tekken 7.

Until in Tekken 8, the UN finally learn Jin's true intention that led Yggdrasil to aid him once again, following Kazuya's coming out as a devil to the world. Using his and Raven's connections, Victor manage to restore the UN's relations with Yggdrasil, in order to focus on their primary enemies who have been conspiring the world besides Kazuya, such as the Devil Gene originator Azazel and his loyal remnants. During the war at Yakushima against G Corporation, Victor leads a platoon consists the fighters King II, Steve Fox, and a fellow soldier Shaheen against a G-Corp platoon led by Sergei Dragunov, an archenemy of Victor's Independent Force, whom Kazuya recruited.

He was announced on November 2, during Paris Game Week 2023.

Victor is modeled after his voice actor, Vincent Cassel.
