= Characters of Final Fantasy XVI =

Promotional artwork by Kazuya Takahashi featuring the core and supporting cast of Final Fantasy XVI. Top from left: Benedikta Harman, Barnabas Tharmr, Hugo Kupka, Joshua Rosfield, Torgal, Dion Lesage, Clive Rosfield, Cidolfus Telamon, and Jill Warrick.

Final Fantasy XVI, an action role-playing game developed, published, and released by Square Enix in 2023, is the sixteenth mainline entry in the Final Fantasy series. The game's world design was a collaborative effort between producer Naoki Yoshida, co-director Hiroshi Takai, co-director and lead writer Kazutoyo Maehiro, and art director Hiroshi Minagawa. The characters and Eikon summoned monsters were designed by Kazuya Takahashi, while Michael-Christopher Koji Fox handled localization and helped with writing.

The plot revolves around a resource war in the world of Valisthea, with magical beings dubbed Eikons and their human hosts−Dominants−playing key roles in the conflict. The main protagonist is Clive Rosfield, a son of the Duke of Rosaria who sets out on a quest for revenge after he is betrayed and becomes host of the mysterious Eikon Ifrit. His main companions are Jill Warrick, a former princess of the Northern Territories and Dominant of Shiva; and Cidolfus Telamon, a fighter for abused magic users and Dominant of Ramuh. Other major characters are Joshua Rosfield, Clive's younger brother and Dominant of Phoenix; Hugo Kupka, Dominant of Titan and key political figure in the Dhalmekian Republic; Barnabas Tharmr, king of Waloed and Dominant of Odin; Benedikta Harman, a Waloedan spy and Dominant of Garuda; and Dion Lesage, crown prince of Sanbreque and the Dominant of Bahamut.

The goal was a mature dark fantasy storyline, focusing on themes of love, the interdependence of good and evil, and clashing values. Maehiro created the world first based on the Eikons' central role. The team drew early inspiration from the television series Game of Thrones, alongside classic and contemporary anime. Takahashi's character designs, which are noted for having a light style, were adjusted to be darker and fit the world's aesthetic. The game's dub prioritized European voice actors over American ones, with English recording and motion capture coming before Japanese. Reception of the cast has been positive, with praise often going to Clive's character development and the English performances. Criticism has focused on the portrayal of its story themes. There was additional discussion on both the perceived lack of ethnic diversity in the world and cast, and its inclusion of LGBT characters.

== Creation and development ==
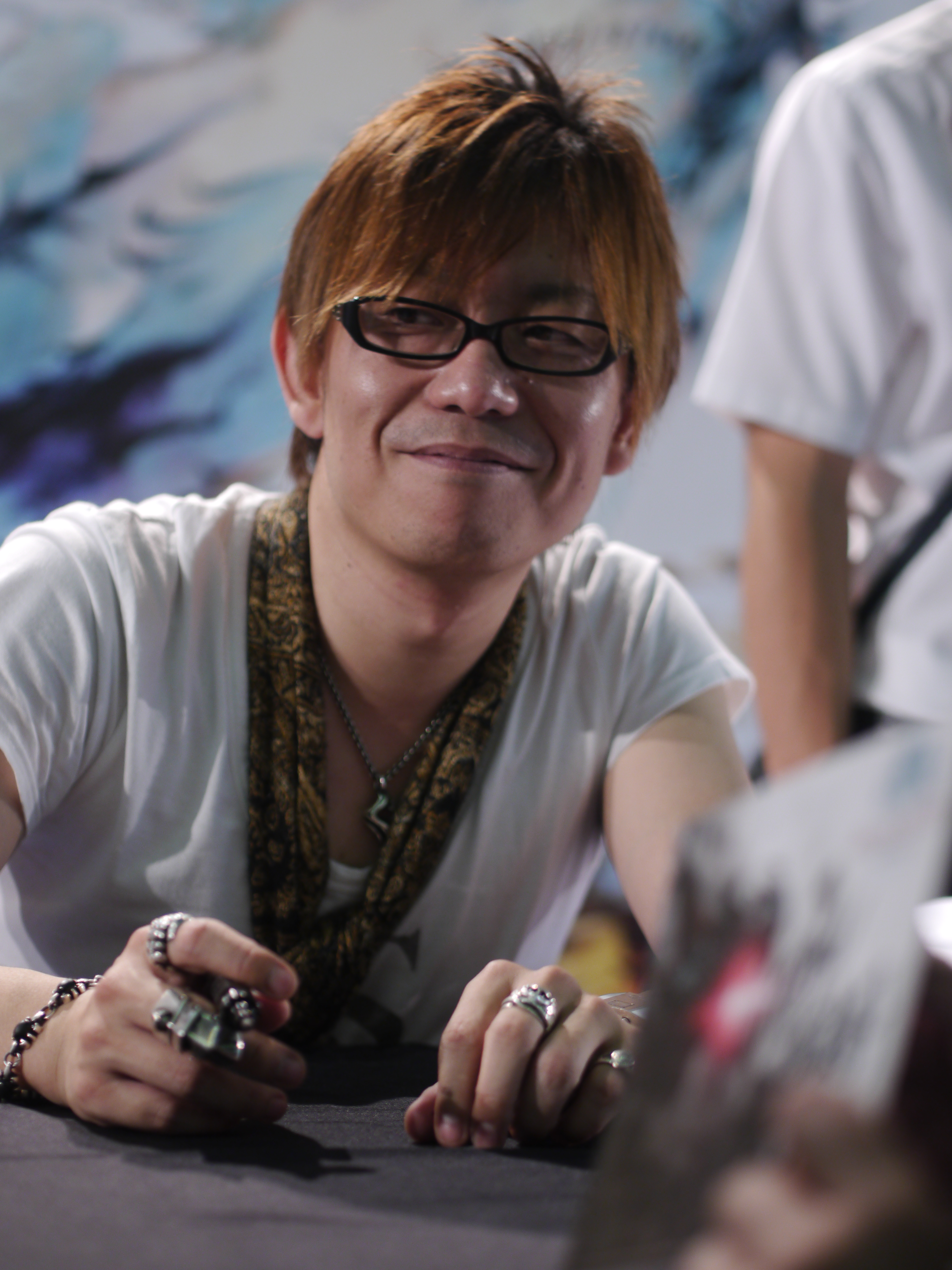
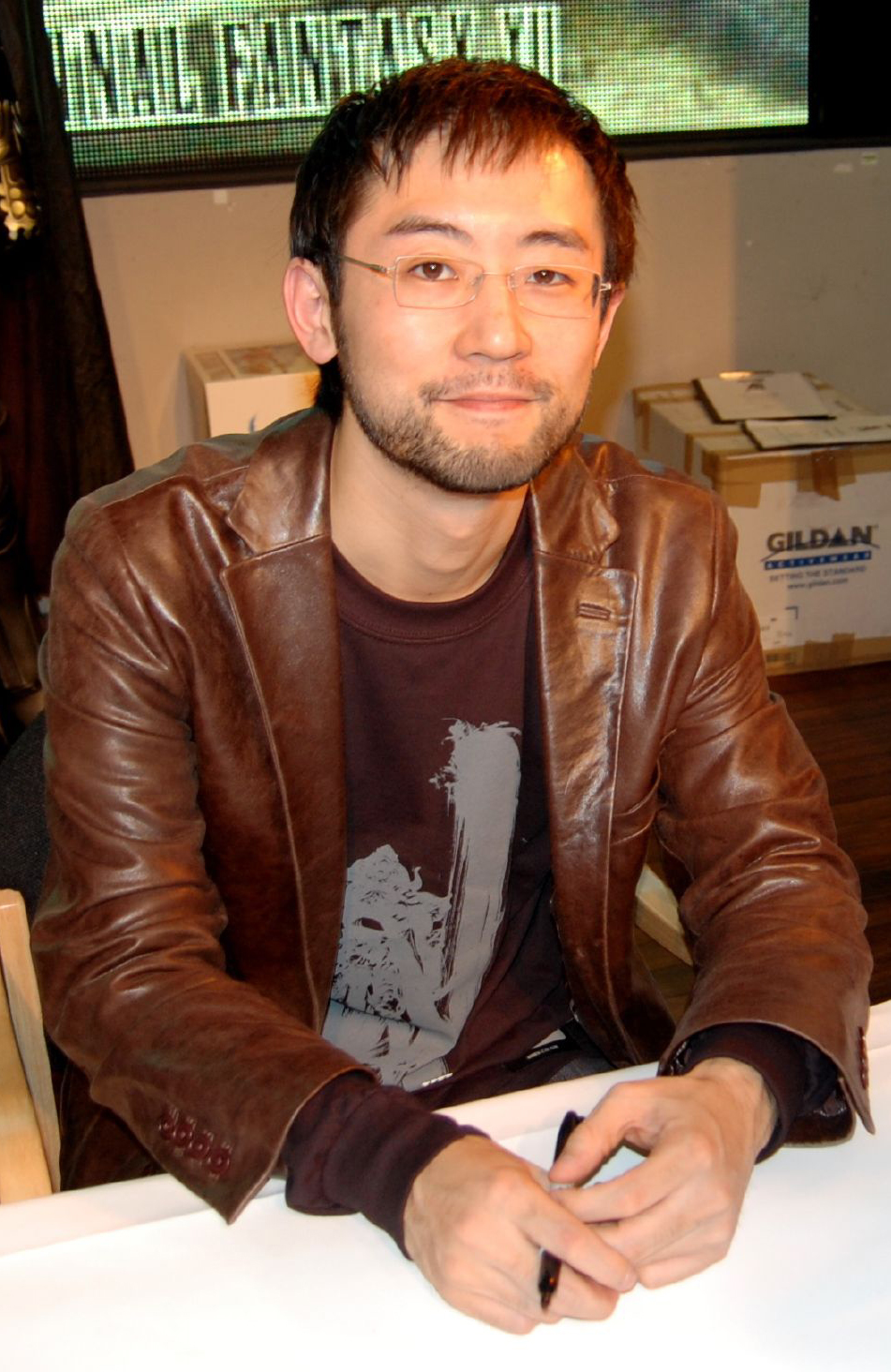
The world and story of Final Fantasy XVI was a collaborative effort between multiple staff members, including producer Naoki Yoshida (left), and art director Hiroshi Minagawa (right).

The concept and setting of Final Fantasy XVI was created by producer Naoki Yoshida, co-director Hiroshi Takai, co-director and lead writer Kazutoyo Maehiro, and art director Hiroshi Minagawa. In contrast with recent Final Fantasy titles, which featured science fiction elements, Final Fantasy XVI returned to a high fantasy and medieval setting. Takai wanted a mature dark fantasy narrative that would tackle difficult themes. Yoshida wanted the game to cater to neither children or adults, but rather reach "players of all generations". He also wanted to separate the game from commonly associated stereotypes such as an anime-inspired art style and a story focusing on teenagers. Maehiro's world and narrative design drew inspiration from Greek mythology.

The earliest decision was to feature the Eikons, the game's version of recurring Final Fantasy summoned monsters, in a central role. With this in mind, Maehiro created the map of Valisthea first, basing the locations of Eikons and nations around those elements, and then writing Clive's story to place within these events and areas. Using two Eikons of fire referenced early Greek ideas of the original life being in fire, with the Eikons Phoenix and Ifrit designed as a contrasting pair. Crystals, a recurring feature in the series, were portrayed as an analogy to depleted fossil fuels, while Dominants and Eikons acted as analogies for weapons of mass destruction. A recurring marketing tagline, "The legacy of the crystals has shaped our history for long enough", was meant to symbolize both a break from the science fiction style of recent entries and a questioning of the crystal's role of bestowing power on humans. While the recurring Final Fantasy mascots Chocobos and Moogles were omitted from the initial design, staff protests prompted Maehiro to adjust his world design to allow for their inclusion.

The initial narrative drew inspiration from the early seasons of Game of Thrones. Other inspirations, including classic and contemporary anime, were used to prevent too many similarities to Game of Thrones. The Eikon battles were inspired by the large-scale battles of Ultraman and Neon Genesis Evangelion. Maehiro created the initial script, which was checked and completed by localization lead Michael-Christopher Koji Fox. In addition to the scenario, the game's dialogue was written before game design was finalized. Despite the overall story being dark in tone, the staff chose to also include light-hearted elements. When creating world design and story, the team took criticism from Final Fantasy XV (2016) into account, including its fragmented delivery of the story. Due to the game's large scope, the team frequently considered cutting one of the two continents, but kept both to avoid disruptive rewrites; however, Takai and Maehiro described the effort of making the two continents work as "hell". Compared to other recent Final Fantasy titles, there was no plan for "tertiary content" such as downloadable content (DLC) and books, instead having the entire story told within the game. Due to the game's positive responses, a dedicated team created DLC exploring background elements to the narrative related to the Fallen civilization and the Eikon Leviathan.

The story focus was main protagonist Clive Rosfield and the relationships he forms with different people through the warring nations. The story's central theme was the clashing of values held by different people, alongside the choice of whether to accept or resist a given fate. Two other themes outlined by the team were the interdependence and ambiguity of good and evil, inspired by Christopher Nolan's The Dark Knight Trilogy, and different forms of love, be it for a nation or a person. While the early plot focused on Clive's quest for revenge, the story later shifted to political rivalries and then focusing on self-identity, reflecting Clive's evolving view of the world. Clive and Joshua's fate, along with the authorship of a history book seen in the post-credits sequence, were left deliberately ambiguous. Speaking on the portrayal of ethnic diversity in the game's world, Yoshida stated that its relative lack of diversity fitted into both its medieval European setting and the in-universe isolation of Valisthea's lands. He admitted potential representation issues, but foresaw problems with both breaking player immersion in the setting, and problematic stereotypes associated with protagonists or antagonists. The team ultimately decided to focus on the characters' personalities and narratives over their appearance. In a follow-up, he noted the game's world was inspired by cultures from across the world, acknowledging that some might disagree with their approach.

The world's visual design was inspired by Game of Thrones, with Minagawa drawing direct inspiration from the landscapes of Northern England, Slovenia, the Middle East, Africa, and Dalmasca from Final Fantasy XII. The characters and Eikons were designed by Kazuya Takahashi, who is known for his work on Final Fantasy XIV. Minagawa described blending Takahashi's light illustration style with the dark tone of the game as his biggest challenge when finalizing the art design. Classic Final Fantasy jobs were used as a design inspiration for enemies and some NPCs. The Eikons were based on established and popular summons from across the Final Fantasy series, with Ifrit given a prominent role to contrast his earlier portrayal as a summon for beginners. Their established physical characteristics and possible styles of combat informed their design. They were inspired based on older sprite art versions from early Final Fantasy titles. Two of the Eikons, Ifrit and Phoenix, were featured in the logo illustrated by Yoshitaka Amano, and was designed based on the game's story and themes.

While the initial script was written in Japanese, Fox both localized and rewrote the script to work in English, then the final Japanese script was adjusted to match the English version. In contrast to earlier entries, the cutscenes were motion captured in English. Due to this, there was no Japanese lip syncing, though the team unsuccessfully tried using an automated system to match the Japanese dub to the characters. The performance director was Hannah Price. Yoshida stayed away from the recording process both due to company policy and out of "respect" for the writers, as he would likely contradict their decisions and cause issues. English voice work was done by European actors, a non-standard approach done to appeal to the North American market. The character accents were chosen to communicate locality for different characters, with a cited example being using a Geordie accent for people from the north of Valisthea. Voice recording and motion capture work began in 2019, with the roles being kept secret using scattered recording schedules and character code names.

== Main characters ==
=== Clive Rosfield ===
Clive Rosfield (クライヴ・ロズフィールド, Kuraivu Rozufīrudo) is the main protagonist and primary playable character of Final Fantasy XVI. He is the firstborn son of the Duke of Rosaria, but is debarred following his failure to awaken to the Dominant Phoenix. As compensation, he trains as a swordsman and becomes the First Shield to his younger brother Joshua, who inherits Phoenix's power. Joshua also shares some of Phoenix's power with Clive, who can use magical powers. As a teenager, Clive's mother Anabella betrays Rosaria to Sanbreque and he witnesses the Dark Eikon Ifrit seemingly kill Joshua. After being enslaved in Sanbreque's army, he vows revenge on Ifrit. He ends up defecting to rescue his childhood friend Jill and joins the rebel Cid. After learning that he manifested Ifrit, his goal changes to destroying Valisthea's Mothercrystals and end the Blight, after Cid‘s vision. After Cid is killed, he takes on his name and continues working with Jill, developing a romance with her. He is revealed to be the planned "Mythos", a vessel for the alien being Ultima who can fulfill his people's planned resurrection. Clive, instead embracing his alternate fate as the rebellious "Logos", destroys Ultima and the final Mothercrystal, removing magic from Valisthea. He is last seen lying on a beach as his hand begins to petrify as a result of overusing his powers, leaving his fate ambiguous.

Clive's design was based around the archetype of a prince of darkness. Takahashi created his armor and clothing around the design specification of a country with little power, with his muscular build meant to appeal to the Western market. He was initially intended to have silver hair, which Takahashi changed to black to reflect the game's dark tone. Clive's design was a collaborative effort between the art team and the CGI team, with the latter helping make Clive's in-game model more realistic and natural. His name was chosen due to Yoshida liking its sound. Clive is voiced by Ben Starr in English, and in Japanese by Yuma Uchida as a child and Yūya Uchida as an adult. Starr initially auditioned for a different minor character, but both the English and Japanese staff were impressed by his voice and decided to recast him as Clive. Starr was unprepared for the size of his role, and noted the difficulty with some of the recording, as they had no other version to reference. He drew inspiration for his portrayal from Justin Theroux's character in The Leftovers, referencing Clive's "warped masculinity" and unwillingness to cry. Clive later appeared as a guest character in Tekken 8, via downloadable content released in December 2024.

=== Joshua Rosfield ===
Joshua Rosfield (ジョシュア・ロズフィールド, Joshua Rozufīrudo) is Clive's younger brother, second son of the Duke of Rosaria and the Dominant of Phoenix. He is sickly and meek compared to his brother, and is reluctant to fulfil his role as Dominant. Upon seeing his nation attacked and his father killed before him, Joshua awakens as Phoenix and attacks indiscriminately until Ifrit manifests and seemingly kills him. In reality, the Phoenix revived him and he learned of Ultima; to prevent Clive becoming his pawn, he seals away a piece of Ultima when he first attacks him. He first allies with Dion, then reunites with Clive and his allies for the final battle against Ultima. He is mortally wounded after Ultima retrieves the piece he trapped, and sacrifices himself to give Clive the Phoenix's power. He is last seen as Clive heals his wounds using Ultima's absorbed powers. In a post-credits scene, a book titled Final Fantasy is shown bearing his name.

Takahashi created Joshua's design to convey the need for him to be protected, while his Phoenix form was meant to be the least unusual of the Eikons due to it being an imposing presence. Joshua is voiced by Logan Hannan in English, and Natsumi Fujiwara in Japanese. As an adult, he is voiced by Jonathan Case in English and Takeo Ōtsuka in Japanese. Joshua's motion capture as a child was done by an actor near his age, but when voice recording came, that actor's voice had broken and the role needed to be recast. Hannan was brought on after Fox played A Plague Tale: Innocence, in which Hannan played Hugo. Joshua was Case's first video game role, and he went into it without preconceptions about how to perform the part.

=== Cidolfus Telamon ===
Cidolfus Telamon (シドルファス・テラモーン, Shidorufasu Teramōn), also called "Cid" (シド, Shido) by his friends, is the leader of a rebel group within Valisthea seeking to liberate magic users from enslavement and abuse. He is an outsider who awoke as the lightning Eikon Ramuh's Dominant upon arriving in Valisthea; he initially allied with the nation of Waloed before breaking away due to a difference in vision. Having learned the Mothercrystals are draining aether from Valisthea and causing the Blight, he vows to destroy them and recruits Clive and Jill to his cause. It is later revealed he is slowly dying from the petrification curse, which afflicts magic users who overuse their power. While destroying Sanbreque's Mothercrystal, the piece of Ultima within it attacks and mortally wounds him, with him giving his Eikon's powers to Clive before dying.

Cidolfus is an incarnation of a recurring character within the Final Fantasy series. Yoshida described Cid as acting as a father figure for Clive following his rescue. His design was intended to be that of a "cool" older man. Cid is voiced by Ralph Ineson in English and Hiroshi Shirokuma in Japanese. Ineson, who had done work in video games and series, including Game of Thrones, completed his scenes early and generally worked with Starr, only learning what the project was near the end.

=== Jill Warrick ===
Jill Warrick (ジル・ワーリック, Jiru Wārikku) is the lead female character of Final Fantasy XVI. She is a former princess of the now-destroyed Northern Territories, and originally lived with Clive and Joshua in Rosaria as a political hostage. After Sanbreque's attack, she awakens as the Dominant of Shiva and is enslaved as a soldier of war for the Iron Kingdom. She joins Clive and Cid's cause after they rescue her, helping with destroying the Mothercrystals and taking revenge on the Iron Kingdom's religious leader. Following Cid's death, she becomes Clive's trusted advisor and aide, eventually developing mutual romantic feelings for him. Exhausted from overusing her Eikon and briefly being kidnapped by Barnabas, Jill is unable to prime without risking her life and gives Shiva's power to Clive. The powerless Jill is left behind for her safety as Clive faces Ultima, and is last seen staring up into the sky where Clive went.

Takahashi's brief for Jill was a character who suffered greatly in her life, with her adult form having a more severe face and manner than as a child. Her Shiva form was intended to be regal, having a tiara and cape, along with a large cloak to enlarge her presence. Jill is voiced in English by Charlotte McBurney as a child and Susannah Fielding as an adult, and in Japanese by Megumi Han. Similar to Starr, Fielding was unprepared for the size of her role, and the two had multiple scenes where the two characters were trying to connect. She enjoyed Jill's character growth from a weakened figure to rediscovering her strength.

=== Torgal ===
Torgal (トルガル, Torugaru) is Clive's wolf companion. He was rescued as a puppy from the Blight-destroyed Northern Territories after being separated from his pack, with Cid taking him in following Ifrit's rampage. He eventually reunites with Clive and Jill, and joins them on their quest over the next several years. He demonstrates the ability to channel magical powers when he helps rescue Jill and Clive from execution. He is later revealed to be a rare Frost Wolf, a descendant of an ancient companion to a royal Dominant of Shiva who can absorb and channel aether.

While describing the design process, Takahashi remembered initially being ordered to use a "Japanese Dog" as the template. The design proved difficult to make convincing as a fighting companion, so Torgal was changed to resemble a wolf. Alongside the adult version, Takahashi created a puppy version, which he described as "cuter" than he expected it to be.

== Supporting cast ==
=== Dion Lesage ===
Dion Lesage (ディオン・ルサージュ, Dion Rusāju) is the crown prince of the Empire of Sanbreque and the Dominant of Bahamut, the Eikon of Light. He is also the Lord Commander of the Empire's Dragoon soldiers, and is loved by his people and a feared force on the battlefield. After Anabella begins influencing his father and pushing for her son Olivier to be made heir, Dion launches a coup against her with Joshua's encouragement and the aid of Terence, his lover and second-in-command. Dion attempts to kill Olivier, but inadvertently kills his father instead. In Dion's despair, Olivier goads him into transforming into Bahamut and rampaging across his kingdom. Clive and Joshua engage Dion in their primal forms, weakening him and causing him to transform back. He then kills Olivier to avenge his father. Now determined to atone for his actions, he joins Clive and Joshua's assault on Ultima's fortress Origin, but dies while helping them get through its defenses.

In contrast to Clive, Dion was intended as the archetype of a heroic prince of light. His design deliberately evoked the Dragoons from earlier Final Fantasy games. Bahamut's design was originally much larger than in the final game, with remnants of this goal surviving in the Eikon's large wings and long tail. Dion is voiced by Stewart Clarke in English and Yuichi Nakamura in Japanese.

=== Ultima ===
Ultima (アルテマ, Arutema) is the main antagonist of the game, who mostly acts through proxies such as Barnabas. He is the avatar of an ancient civilization that discarded their physical forms after their nation succumbed to the Blight. They created the Mothercrystals to gather aether from Valisthea for a powerful resurrection spell, and humanity−descended from the ancient Fallen people−to produce the "Mythos", a host who can channel the Eikons and cast the spell at the cost of Valisthea. While the humans gained free will, Ultima continues to manipulate them through the Mothercrystals, shapeshifting, and worshipping cults. Ultima's goals are unwittingly fulfilled as Clive destroys the Mothercrystals and absorbs Eikons. After Valisthea's Mothercrystals are destroyed, he unleashes an army of Akashic−aether-corrupted creatures−and raises his fortress Origin to begin the resurrection spell. Clive ultimately defeats and absorbs him, using his power to destroy and remove magic from Valisthea, ending the Blight. Ultima is voiced by Harry Lloyd in English and Mitsuru Miyamoto in Japanese.

=== Barnabas Tharmr ===
Barnabas Tharmr (バルナバス・ザルム, Barunabasu Zarumu) is the king of Waloed and the Dominant of Odin, the Eikon of darkness, who dominates the Ash continent. He originates from another land, where his family was part of a cult that worshipped Ultima; after a mob killed his mother, he fled and reached Valisthea, landing on Ash. After falling under Ultima's sway, he comes to believe in his plan to wipe away humanity, transforming himself into a sentient Akashic to live long enough to fulfil his role. He challenges Clive several times, aiming to destroy his personal connections and forge him into the Mythos. After Ash's population is transformed into Akashic, Clive confronts him and fights him to the death, with him forcing his Eikon powers onto Clive before dying.

Barnabas's design was intended to evoke a "king cloaked entirely in mystery", inspired indirectly by the Dark Knight motif of earlier games. Takahashi wanted to convey both self-confidence and "emptiness" through his design. Odin was created to appear regal, but also unsettling, with a head combining a helmet with a skull design. Barnabas is voiced by David Menkin in English and Gotaro Tsunashima in Japanese. Menkin had previously voiced Magnus in Final Fantasy XIV expansion Shadowbringers, attributing getting the role of Barnabas to his performance as Magnus. He called Barnabas one of the most interesting characters he had played.

=== Hugo Kupka ===
Hugo Kupka (フーゴ・クプカ, Fūgo Kupuka) is the current Dominant of the earth Eikon Titan, and the political leader and figurehead of the Dhalmekian Republic. He was originally a soldier in the Dhalmekian army, but his emergence as a Dominant allowed him to amass vast wealth and power; he frequently engages in battles with enemy armies and political manipulation of the Dhalmekian council. He is also conducting an affair with Benedikta, and following her death goes on a vendetta against Clive and his allies. During one battle, Hugo loses his hands and Dominant powers to Clive. Now seeking revenge, an agent of Ultima tricks him into overusing his Mothercrystal, causing him to transform into a raging form of Titan that Clive kills.

Hugo's muscular appearance was based on Takai's request for a world where characters with strength-based magic also appeared physically strong, with Takahashi having fun with the design. Titan's thorny legs represented Hugo's ruthless personality. Hugo is voiced by Alex Lanipekun in English and Yasuhiro Mamiya in Japanese. Lanipekun found portraying Hugo's political and physical power to be the most interesting part of the role.

=== Benedikta Harman ===
Benedikta Harman (ベネディクタ・ハーマン, Benedikuta Hāman) is the leader of Waloed's "intelligencer" spy unit, and the Dominant of the Wind Eikon Garuda. Having lived a harsh life before Barnabas took her in, she developed a cold and manipulative personality. She and Cid had an implied relationship after he saved her from slavers in the past, before his desertion embittered her against him. She also conducts an affair with Hugo. She acts as an initial antagonist, but she becomes emotionally unbalanced after Clive steals her power. After bandits attack and kill her soldiers, she transforms into a rampaging Garuda until Clive unwittingly transforms into Ifrit and kills her.

Takahashi created the designs for Benedikta and Garuda simultaneously, with Garuda being one of the two earliest Eikons designed and informing the overall design theme of the others. He described Benedikta's design as being created "honestly" without worrying about it. Benedikta is voiced by Nina Yndis in English and Akari Higuchi in Japanese. Like Menkin, Yndis had previously voiced a character in Shadowbringers, and did not know what part she was playing until recording ended. Due to her short appearance in the story, Fox and Yndis stated the need to convey her personality and backstory through performance alone.

=== Anabella Rosfield ===
Anabella Rosfield (アナベラ・ロズフィールド, Anabera Rozufīrudo) is the Duchess of Rosaria through a cousin marriage to Elwin, and Clive and Joshua's mother. She later becomes the Empress of Sanbreque and acts as a major antagonist in the game's storyline. Despite having loved Joshua dearly, she despises Clive due to his lack of power and dislikes Jill. To preserve her bloodline and nobility, she allies with Sanbreque, betrays Rosaria to them, and has Clive enslaved. Over the following decade, Anabella marries Sanbreque's emperor Sylvestre Lesage and has a son named Olivier, unaware he is a vessel for Ultima to influence the Sanbreque court. Anabella manipulates Sylvestre to alienate Dion, eventually leading him to select Olivier as his heir in Dion's place. An outraged Dion then launches a coup against Anabella and kills Olivier in front of her. Mad with grief, Anabella kills herself despite Joshua's attempt to reach out to her. Anabella is voiced by Christina Cole in English and Yurika Hino in Japanese.

== Other characters ==
- Gav (ガブ, Gabu) is a scout and tracker originally loyal to Cid who becomes an early loyal ally to Clive in his quest to destroy the Mothercrystals. He survives Titan's assault on Cid's original hideout despite losing an eye, and continues aiding him and Jill with reconnaissance work across the nations while becoming a close friend and confidant. He helps save a survivor of Waloed escape, a pregnant woman who gives birth after Origin's destructions. Gav is voiced by Christopher York in English and Anri Katsu in Japanese.
- Vivian Ninetales (ヴィヴィアン・ナインテールズ, Vivian Naintēruzu) acts as Clive's strategist. She is a former resident of the Crystalline Dominion and possesses knowledge of the political factions of Valisthea, offering resumes of recent events for Clive's benefit. Vivian is voiced by Lara Sawalha in English and Yuki Anando in Japanese.
- Midadol Telamon (ミドアドル・テラモーン, Midoadoru Teramōn), Mid for short, is Cid's adopted daughter, a gifted engineer who joins Clive's faction after Barnabas tries to use her as leverage against Clive. She is the creator and pilot of the Enterprise, a powerful ship used to navigate Valisthea's oceans. Mid is voiced by Katie Clarkson-Hill in English and Mai Yamane in Japanese.
- Elwin Rosfield (エルウィン・ロズフィールド, Eruwin Rozufīrudo) is the Archduke of Rosalith and Clive and Joshua's father. He inherited the throne despite not being a Dominant due to the death of his father, and treats Clive with kindness when he can. He is brutally killed before Joshua during the attack by Sanbreque, triggering Joshua's transformation into Phoenix. Elwin is voiced by John Hopkins in English and Hiroyuki Kinoshita in Japanese.
- Sylvestre Lesage (シルヴェストル・ルサージュド, Shiruvesutoru Rusāju) is the Emperor of Sanbreque, playing a minor antagonistic role. After initially striking the bargain with Anabella, he comes under the influence of Ultima working through the form of Olivier, causing him to become increasingly war-focused and disinherit Dion and abdicate the throne to Olivier. After Dion tries to kill Olivier, Sylvestre intervenes and dies instead. Sylvestre is voiced by Andrew Havill in English and Kazuhiro Yamaji in Japanese.

== Reception ==
Cullen Black of RPG Site positively noted the quality of writing for side characters and smaller quests, and praised the game's incarnation of Cid as one of the best in the series. He positively compared the game's themes and writing to Final Fantasy Tactics (1997), noting its examination of the cost of uprooting corrupt societies, and praised Clive's portrayal and character development. GameSpot's Michael Higham described the narrative as principally focused on Clive's growth, praising his interactions with the supporting cast, giving praise to the voice performances for the core cast. Jordan Middler, writing for Video Games Chronicle, described the game's cast as "an absolute highlight", lauding the performances of Starr, Fielding and Ineson in their roles. Adam Beck of Hardcore Gamer praised the more human focus of the story and low-key introduction of its fantasy elements, and IGN's Mitchell Saltzman praised Clive's development across the game while remaining likeable and relatable, lauding the cast and voice performances overall. Eric Van Allen, writing for Destructoid, enjoyed the English cast's performances, positively noting Starr's performance as Clive, calling Ineson as Cid "particularly memorable", and praising Clarke in the role of Dion. His main criticism were inconsistent handling of the story themes around Bearers and the sidelining of some side plots.

Moises Taveras of Paste Magazine was positive about Clive and Jill's character development and the warmth shown by many characters within the game's grim setting, but disliked the later tonal change from challenging slavery to a greater magical threat. Zach Wilkerson of RPGFan enjoyed the cast and their stories overall, with his major complaint being its scarcity and portrayal of female characters, describing them as "thinly developed and far too defined by the men in their lives". Wesley LeBlanc of Game Informer praised the cast performances and later plot and said players would enjoy the romantic elements, though he noted that the storyline seemed too similar to Game of Thrones at times. Edwin Evans-Thirlwell, writing for Eurogamer, found Clive enjoyable but simple compared to the rest of the cast, and noted the game's deconstruction of the hero trope through Clive's actions and their consequences. Digital Trends's Giovanni Colantonio was disappointed with both the overall story and the character arcs, saying it was "hard to differentiate its flat characters from one another". Gita Jackson of Polygon generally disliked the story design and the portrayal of slavery in-game, but enjoyed Clive and Jill's romance and Cid's personality when compared to the writing and dark tone, and praised the voice acting.

A recurring point with both players and reviewers was the perceived lack of ethnic diversity in the cast and in-game world, and Yoshida's response to the issue. While enjoying the story, Evans-Thirlwell highlighted the lack of ethnic diversity despite the size of its world, feeling it undermined the game's messages. Like Evans-Thirlwell, LeBlanc felt that the all-White cast undermined the early themes and in-game usage of slavery of magic users, a sentiment echoed by Jackson. Colantonio similarly echoed thoughts on the game's lack of diversity, highlighted by the African styling of one of the in-game nations. In an article on the situation, Ash Parrish of The Verge highlighted common arguments against Yoshida's approach−its fantasy setting and historical proof of ethnic diversity in medieval Europe−and felt it undermined the game's goals of reaching out to a larger audience. She further highlighted the earlier Final Fantasy XII and XIV as counterarguments to Final Fantasy XVI's approach, with both featuring ethnic diversity in a Medieval-inspired fantasy setting.

A more positive reaction came from the inclusion of LGBT characters in the game's world, most notably Dion and Terence's confirmed romance. Iain Harris of GamesRadar+, writing about the social media reactions, noted both the explicit romance and casual dialogue found in the world that showed a general presence of LGBT relationships. Ed Nightingale, writing for Eurogamer, was very positive about LGBT characters being included without emphasizing their orientation, normalizing them within the world of Valisthea. He saw this as part of a more progressive attitude from Square Enix regarding wider inclusivity of gender and sexuality. TechRadar's Cat Bussell saw Dion as a positive step forward for the series, but felt his romance with Terence did not get much open exploration or attention compared to romantic or sexual scenes with female characters. She also noted that Dion's death represented a still-common tradition of LGBT characters dying in media.
