= Miary Zo =

Tekken character

- Tekken character
- Miary Zo in Tekken 8
- First appearance: Tekken 8 (2024)
- Voiced by: Gaelle Mamiratra Anjakanjanahary

In-universe information
- Fighting style: Moraingy
- Origin: Madagascar
- Nationality: Malagasy

Nomenjanahary Miary Zo Andrianavalona (ノーメンジャナハリ・ミアリズ・アンドリアナヴァロナ, Nōmenjanahari Miarizu Andorianavarona), better-known as Miary Zo (ミアリズ, Miarizu), is a character from the Tekken fighting game series by Bandai Namco Entertainment. Introduced in Tekken 8 via DLC. She is assisted by two pet lemurs named Vanilla (バニラ, Banira) and Cacao (カカオ, Kakao). Miary Zo was created in response to the lack of African representation in the series, as well as Madagascar's Tekken community. The character's fighting style consists of Moraingy and other African styles. She has received a mixed reception.

== Conception and design ==
The creation of Miary Zo was inspired by series director Katsuhiro Harada, who traveled to Madagascar and discovered its "very vibrant" Tekken community, which, along with the lack of African representation in general, prompted the team to focus on creating a character from Madagascar. Series designer Michael Murray stated, "They tried to make it authentic by working with some advisors in the community there to make sure that they're creating something that looks like it would be from that area". Regarding Miary Zo's connection with Ogre, Murray stated, "there should be one Ogre per continent", while noting that the Ogre from Tekken 3 is the South American version, and the one fused with Miary Zo is the Malagasy version, who is nicknamed "the Silver Ogre".

In an interview with IGN, Kohei Ikeda, director of Tekken 8, stated "So actually going [to Madagascar] and learning about the people and culture, the history of the country, not only that, but just to walk around the city and see what actual people look like, the heights, what their hairstyles look like, the color of skin, just in general what the general population looks like." Due to the lack of video game voice actors in Madagascar, the team had difficulty finding a voice actor for the character before settling on Gaelle Mamiratra Anjakanjanahary. The character's full name is Nomenjanahary Miary Zo Andrianavalona.

== Appearance and gameplay ==
Miary Zo makes her first and so far, only, appearance in Tekken 8, as a DLC character, released on December 2, 2025. Miary Zo was born with eyes the color of glowing coals, and was fascinated by wildlife. She became interested in martial arts through mimicking moves of the wildlife. Six months before the events of Tekken 8, she learned from her grandmother that she's the vessel of the Silver Fighting God. She, along with her two pet lemurs, named Vanilla and Cacao, enters the tournament to test out her skills and make new "BFFs" (battle friends forever).

Her moveset was inspired by Moraingy, a Malagasy boxing style, along with other African fighting styles. The staff at Duniagames described her moveset as "[feeling] like a blend of capoeira and freestyle techniques never before seen in a Tekken roster". They observed that she is weak in mid to long-range, however. Her moveset also uses a summoned spear and Ogre-powered techniques.

== Critical reception ==
The staff at Duniagames considers Miary Zo to be a well-designed character, stating, "It shows that Tekken 8 is truly in an era where diversity and creativity are at the heart of character development". Miguel Carpena of GFinity Esports praised her design, but was critical of her carrying the same power as Ogre from Tekken 3, and incorporating that into her move set. Sammy Barker from Push Square was indifferent to her design and described her as a "typical busty female fighting game character". The staff at Italian magazine Gazzetta Di Parma describes Miary Zo as an example of the Tekken series taking a "Dragon Ball-esque turn, pushed to the extreme". They further state that it "emphasizes the more phantasmagorical aspects of a production that naturally tends towards the spectacle of Japanese anime". Lucas Rahajaniaina, writing for Independent Reporter, considered her a "powerful symbol," rather than simply another character. Rahajaniaina would also go on to state, "this character represents something deeper: the possibility for young Malagasy people to be seen, recognized, and represented". In a preview of the character, Matthew Danielson from Screen Rant stated he is excited to see her in action, while commenting that her moveset is "likely reflective of long-standing tradition and rich cultural influence". Danielson also added, "In my opinion, more fighting games should follow Tekken's example, as many fighters seem to only have character origins as labels rather than defining traits".

According to Olivia Richman of The Escapist, her design was criticized by Tekken fans as a "flash in the pan" female character, in spite of her Madagascan origins, due to looking very similar to most other female characters in the game. Because of this, she was given a slight makeover before release. In another article by The Escapist, Richman stated, "Meanwhile, Tekken devs are clearly scared to make any of the female characters have varying shapes or faces", when looking over various male characters in comparison to Miary Zo's design. Joe Foley of Creative Bloq noted that Miary Zo was originally designed with darker skin and different facial features from other female characters, much to the surprise of game artist Del Walker, who proposed a different design for her; many fans prefer this design, with one fan describing her as an "Azucena and Josie reject". Foley also stated how some fans are confused as to why her final design is similar to the other female characters, while the original concept art was much different. Director Katsuhiro Harada has responded to these controversies, retweeting a post by a user who states, "Nearly 90% people from central Madagascar look like her". Similarly, Nishikawa Yuki of Famitsu argued she is accurately portrayed as a Malagasy person by examining her skin tone and hairstyle. In spite of controversy, Miary Zo proved to be very popular in Madagascar, appearing on the front pages of the country's local newspapers.
