= Shaheen (Tekken) =

Fictional character in Tekken

- Tekken character
- Shaheen in Tekken 8 (2024)
- First appearance: Tekken 7 (2015)
- Voiced by: Alain Ghazal (Tekken 7, Tekken 8)

In-universe information
- Fighting style: Military Close-quarters combat
- Origin: Saudi Arabia
- Nationality: Saudi Arabian

Shaheen (Arabic: شاهين Shahin, Japanese: シャヒーン Shahīn) is a character from the Tekken series of video games who made his debut in Tekken 7 and returned for Tekken 8. The character is from Saudi Arabia, and his fighting style is Military Close-quarters combat. The character was created in response to petitions from fans for a non-stereotypical Arab character. He enters the tournaments to try and get revenge on Kazuya Mishima, who was responsible for the death of his best friend, Salim.

== Conception and design ==
Shaheen's original concept art

Shaheen was created in response to fan demand for a non-stereotypical Arab character. Series producer Katsuhiro Harada stated that the concept of an Arab fighter had been considered as early as 2008. However, due to the development team's limited familiarity with Middle Eastern culture and clothing, along with most of the team members being Japanese, the character could not be fully realized at the time. After visiting countries such as Dubai and Saudi Arabia, Harada reiterated his interest in designing an Arabian character.

Upon designing Shaheen, Harada made an effort to connect with fans on Facebook for feedback on the character. Harada posted some concept art for Shaheen on Tekken's Facebook fan group, and while asking for feedback, he noted that asking a question on such a sensitive topic was rare for him. Harada decided that the inclusion of Shaheen in the then-upcoming Tekken 7 would be dependent on how he would be received by Middle Eastern audiences. However, Harada also added that if the character was not well received, he would either drastically change his design, or drop the idea altogether. The positive feedback on the character led to him being included in the game. Harada also deemed Shaheen one of the most difficult characters to design for the game, adding "We had to rework his costume many times before we were satisfied with the end result." The name "Shaheen" was chosen by inspiration from a Tekken fan, and production of the character was overseen by university students from Saudi Arabia.

== Appearances and gameplay ==
Shaheen first appears in Tekken 7, where he learns his best friend Salim has passed away, thanks to Kazuya Mishima and G Corporation. Shaheen enters the tournament to avenge the death of his friend. Shaheen returns for Tekken 8, where he, again, enters the tournament to avenge the late Salim.

Shaheen's gameplay focuses on pokes and counterattacks. Though, he is weak in low attacks. His fighting style is known as Military Close-quarters combat, which includes acrobatic techniques, such as slides and somersaults.

== Reception ==
Having a mostly positive fan reception, Shaheen's reveal for Tekken 7 was discussed in Bahrain's newspaper. Shaheen has also been well received by both Western and Middle Eastern audiences. Some people have also expressed that Shaheen looks similar to internet celebrity Omar Borkan Al Gala. The staff at Game Rant noted that while Shaheen faced some controversy, it was minimal compared to the criticism directed at fellow newcomer Lucky Chloe.

Matt S. from Digitally Downloaded gave a positive review of Shaheen's character. He noted that Shaheen is the first Saudi Arabian character in the Tekken series and one of the few fighting game characters from Saudi Arabia. He stated that including a character from the Arab world is a good step toward representing more cultures in video games. He also mentioned that Shaheen is portrayed more carefully compared to many other Tekken characters, which made him more well-received overall. In the study Arab Dawn: Arab Youth and the Demographic Dividend They Will Bring, author Bessma Momani refers to Shaheen as an example of how Arab youth are shaping their own identities, moving beyond the traditional divide between Islam and modernism. Another study, Arab Gamers: An Identity Inclusivity Study, author Bushra Alfaraj discusses Shaheen as an example of how developers moving from a limited to a more informed understanding of Arab culture can lead to a character design that is more accurate and respectful. She notes that this shift helps move away from vague or stereotypical portrayals toward more authentic and representative ones.

Shaheen has been compared to Rashid from Street Fighter V in the study Contours of virtual enfreakment in fighting game characters, where the authors noted that in both cases, the developers consulted with fans or staff from the Middle East during the design process. This approach was seen as successful, as both characters were viewed as less exaggerated, less sexualized, and more admirable than many others in their respective games. This contrasted with characters like Necalli from Street Fighter V or Josie Rizal from Tekken 7, who were designed without similar local input and were considered more stereotypical. Jahanzeb Khan at Hardcore Gamer noted similarities between Shaheen and cut Virtua Fighter character Siba, and stated that Tekken is "righting some wrongs" of its fighting game rival over 20 years later.
