= Tekken 8 =

2024 video game

- Cover art featuring Kazuya Mishima and Jin Kazama
- Developers: Bandai Namco Studios; Arika
- Publisher: Bandai Namco Entertainment
- Directors: Katsuhiro Harada; Kohei Ikeda; Yasuki Nakabayashi
- Producers: Kohei Ikeda; Yohei Shimbori
- Designers: Yoshinori Takahashi; Sakimori Numata; Takahiro Noda; Masayoshi Noda; Kazuo Takahashi; Noriyuki Hiyama; Ryo Saito; Hideaki Sakai; Masayoshi Noda
- Programmer: Kei Kudo
- Artists: Kousuke Waki; Shinichiro Ozawa; Hiroshi Asai
- Composers: Yusuke Yamauchi; Akitaka Tohyama; Shogo Nomura; Yoshihito Yano; Go Shiina; Shinji Hosoe
- Series: Tekken
- Engine: Unreal Engine 5
- Platforms: PlayStation 5; Windows; Xbox Series X/S
- Release: January 26, 2024
- Genre: Fighting
- Modes: Single-player, multiplayer

Tekken 8 (Japanese: 鉄拳8) is a 2024 fighting game developed by Bandai Namco Studios and Arika and published by Bandai Namco Entertainment. It is the eighth main installment (and tenth overall entry) in the Tekken series and the first one to debut on home systems instead of arcades. Game tests were held starting in July 2023 before the game was released for the PlayStation 5, Windows, and Xbox Series X/S on January 26, 2024.

The base game's story mode, titled The Dark Awakens, takes place six months after the events of its predecessor and focuses on the final confrontation between main protagonist Jin Kazama and main antagonist Kazuya Mishima, as well as the introduction of late Heihachi Mishima's daughter, Reina. Jin's mother Jun Kazama also appears alive in her first canon appearance since Tekken 2. Meanwhile, an additional story mode titled Unforgettable Echoes focuses on Lidia Sobieska, Eddy Gordo, and Yoshimitsu on uncovering the Mishima Clan's ancient history, as well as the resurrection of Heihachi himself after his defeat against Kazuya.

Focusing on more aggressive tones, Tekken 8 was developed using Unreal Engine 5, and it features upgraded fighting elements and systems from its predecessor. Tekken 8 also introduces brand-new mechanics, such as the "Heat" system and "Tornado" hits. Arcade Quest was another addition to their online mode, which includes tournaments, arcade features, customizable avatars, and specialized currency that is featured throughout the game. Upon its release, Tekken 8 received critical acclaim, with critics praising the game's graphics, story, overall progression in the series, and aggressive gameplay. This was the final game in the series Katsuhiro Harada was involved in prior to his departure from Bandai Namco in 2025.

== Gameplay ==
Lars (left) using his Rage art to defeat Claudio

Tekken 8 follows the same fighting game format as previous Tekken games. Katsuhiro Harada, the game's producer, stated that Tekken 8 will be "more aggressive" than its predecessor, indicating that the system will reward players who are proactive in attacking rather than those who are defensive. To achieve this, the game introduced a new system known as "Heat". When a character unlocks the "Heat" state, they cause not only chip damage and additional movesets, but also changes the properties of some of their moves, such as a heavy guard break. These fighters can also dash cancel their moves while in the "Heat" state. Heat's timer can be stopped if fighters' movesets are used. Fighters will also receive chip damage when guarding against a normal state's heavy attack or Heat State characters, allowing them to regenerate their health bars. Unlike the Tag mode-only health bar regeneration system from the Tekken Tag Tournament games, fighters' recoverable health can only be restored by attacking their opponent.

Tekken 8 includes a number of technical updates and reworked features. The "Rage" system, which debuted in the previous entry, returns in Tekken 8 with new changes. For example, the "Rage Drive" has been separated and reworked as "Heat Smash", a "Heat" system super move. The "Screw" mechanism was removed from Tekken 8 and replaced with a "Tornado" extender; the system places opponents in a ground-bound state when they fall to the ground quickly. Specific stages in the game also have hazards, such as some with harder walls and floors that must be broken multiple times by fighters' harder knockout attacks, while others will cause damaged opponents to blast upward when hit by an explosive on the walls and floors.

In addition to technical improvements, Tekken 8 includes changes to other elements. Harada stated that Tekken 8 aims to provide a more cinematic fighting experience, with a focus on stage destructions and specific characters' reactions to them. Furthermore, all character models and voice acting are entirely new, rather than recycled content from previous entries. The online mode includes a battle lobby called "Arcade Quest", which features arcade environments, regular online battles, and tournament matches. "Arcade Quest" allows users to customize their avatars and will use a "Fight Money" currency. Tekken 8 is powered by the next-generation Unreal Engine 5, becoming the first major fighting game to use this engine.

Tekken 8 features crossplay, enabling PlayStation 5, Windows, and Xbox Series X/S players to play against each other for the first time in the franchise's history. Cross-Platform Play can be enabled or disabled depending on the player's preference.

The Scenario Campaign-based Tekken Force Mode from Tekken 6 is only exclusive in the base main story's chapter 10. This mode has exclusive Heat and Rage systems features which original head to head combat scenario systems did not have, such as a Rage Burst, and a Heat gauge that can regenerate automatically and become reusable at full bar. Additionally, when fighting against Azazel or in Tekken Ball Mode, Rage Arts are disabled, with the latter has Rage Arts replaced with Rage Burst.

== Plot ==
=== The Dark Awakens ===
Six months after Heihachi Mishima's defeat, (Note: As depicted in Tekken 7) Jin Kazama, alongside Lars Alexandersson and Lee Chaolan of the Yggdrasil Rebel Army, ambushes his father Kazuya Mishima in Manhattan, New York. However, as Jin is forced to watch Kazuya kill millions in the city, causing him to be haunted by a vision of Ogre killing his mother Jun Kazama, (Note: As depicted in Tekken 3) he loses control of his Devil Gene powers and is defeated, causing the operation to fail. Amidst the chaos, Kazuya, now openly revealing his devil form to the public, announces a new King of Iron Fist Tournament, where representatives of various nations fight one another. The winning nation will be rewarded, while the losing nations will face destruction.

A week later, before the King of Iron Fist Tournament qualifiers begin in the sixth day, Jin, recovering from his injuries, spars with Lars, while Lee analyzes their sparring. As Lars and Lee feared, Jin discovers that he no longer can activate his Devil Gene powers at will. After a brief talk with Alisa Bosconovitch on the third day before the tournament, Jin makes up his mind and joins the qualifiers in Japan, while Alisa, originally going to replace Jin in the tournament, is enlisted to keep an eye on a possible set-up by G Corporation. There, Jin meets Reina, a student from Mishima Polytechnic, whose combat prowess resembles Heihachi, his late grandfather. Jin manages to secure a spot in the main tournament, defeating Reina and his old rival Hwoarang, occasionally showing bursts of his Devil Gene powers in combat. After the battle, Reina requests to join Jin in his fight against Kazuya, keeping her true intentions hidden.

Elsewhere in Rome, Italy, Claudio Serafino, Zafina, and Ling Xiaoyu watch the tournament. Zafina reveals to Claudio the reason Jin declared a third world war against Kazuya during his time leading Mishima Zaibatsu was to lure the demonic creature Azazel and destroy it. (Note: As depicted in Tekken 6) However, Azazel's soul was still alive after its defeat and is now sealed in Zafina's left arm. She discovers that Kazuya's growing avarice had been a main source behind Azazel's growing power, and warns Claudio that they need to seek out Jin to stop it. Meanwhile, Leo Kliesen and their father Niklas arrive at the Yggdrasil base, where the latter reveals his research on Azazel and the Devil Gene. He reveals that Azazel granted the gene to ancient man, creating devils to act as its servants, and to access its power, one must have a strong desire. The Hachijo clan, from whom Jin and Kazuya are descended through Heihachi's late wife Kazumi Mishima is one of the servants' descendant clans.

At the main tournament in Rome, Lars meets up with the UN Independent Forces leader and Raven Unit founder Victor Chevalier who agrees to support Yggdrasil in capturing Kazuya, while independently, Claudio, Zafina, and Xiaoyu infiltrate the tournament. Jin defeats Leroy Smith, the tournament's East American Coast representative, who then teaches Jin to let go of his fears and follow his heart, while also being grateful for his heroism against Kazuya's attack in Manhattan. As both Yggdrasil, UN, and Claudio's team begin their assaults, Jin and his expanded allies are too late to realize that the tournament was a set up by Kazuya to lure Zafina, and gather enough dark energies surrounding the turmoil of coliseum during the finals to resurrect Azazel's physical form. Breaking the seal on Zafina's arm, Kazuya unseals Azazel and defeats it, absorbing it to transform a True Devil form. Reina, aware of the Devil Gene, battles Kazuya in this new form but is defeated. In an attempt to buy time for Jin and his allies to escape, Claudio uses his powers and manages to injure Kazuya, seemingly at the cost of his life. Still wrestling with Azazel, Kazuya retreats.

Believing that there is a way to regain control of his devil powers, Jin embarks on a journey to the Kazama Sanctum at his birthplace in Yakushima, deep in the forests of the island, where Jun presumably died at the hands of Ogre. On route to Yakushima, Emilie De Rocherfort reveals that Jin is now the sole survivor of a main branch of the Kazama Clan, which is facing extinction after Jun's disappearance. Kazuya moves his remaining forces to Yakushima, intending to slow down Jin and destroy the rebel army. A coalition of Yggdrasil, the UN, and several combatants from the tournament, including Leroy and Reina, battle against G-Corporation's army, led by Nina Williams and several other tournament combatants under their payroll, while Xiaoyu single-handedly protects Jin from mass-produced Jack-7s as he falls into a deep slumber. Kazuya then appears, obliterating both sides. Lars retreats to the forest to protect Jin from Kazuya, while Reina, believing that near death would awaken some sort of power for her, lets herself be seemingly killed in the blast. Ultimately, as she successfully survives Kazuya's blast and wakes up from a near death, Reina is revealed to be a Devil Gene carrier like Jin and Kazuya.

Deep within his subconsciousness, Jin encounters his devil self, who then mocks Jin's previous failures and crimes. After a lengthy fight against himself, Jin finally accepts his devil side and regains full control of his powers, just in time to save Lars from Kazuya's attack. Kazuya plans to obliterate the island, but Jin stops the blast. After seeing visions of Jun encouraging him, Jin awakens to his Angel form and attacks Kazuya. Kazuya and Jin fight all the way to space, the resulting blast from both sides purges each other's Devil Genes. Landing back on Earth, Jin and Kazuya engage in a final battle between father and son, with Jin emerging victorious. Finally free of the Devil Gene, he thanks his mother and departs with Xiaoyu. An unconscious Kazuya is later approached by a seemingly alive Jun.

During the credits, as the world celebrates their freedom from G Corporation's tyranny, some of the tournament combatants, including ones formerly affiliated with Kazuya during the Yakushima fight, are shown opening food kitchens in Manhattan to help restore the city, Leo and Niklas continue their expedition to parts unknown, the Yggdrasil and UN celebrate their successes in Paris where Shaheen watches the celebration at the yacht, and Zafina and Claudio are both shown alive in the Middle East. (Note: In an alternate ending, triggered if the player loses against Kazuya in his final phase, Kazuya defeats Jin and tosses him off a cliff into the ocean. Back at G Corp headquarters, he remarks that, even without the Devil Gene, he will keep fighting, affirming his belief that power controls everything. During the credits, some of the tournament combatants still affiliated with Kazuya during the Yakushima fight are seen destroying what’s left of Manhattan and even both Yggdrasil and UN, while Nina, who resigned from G Corp during the Yakushima fight, watches the destruction from a yacht in Paris.)

In a mid-credit scene, Reina stands from the ground and vows to avenge her father, Heihachi, while assuming her newly awakened devil form.

=== Unforgotten Echoes ===
Two months prior to the story, Eddy Gordo has been working alongside the Polish prime minister, Lidia Sobieska, to recruit rebel Tekken Force soldiers for the fight against G Corp. He meets up with Lars to have both of their armies coordinate, where he also encounters Jin, who apologizes for the dirty work he forced him to do in the Tekken Force and failing to save his master. After a spar, Eddy forgives Jin for his past actions and the two agree to work together to fight for the future.

Eddy is then sent to the Mishima Zaibatsu base in South America, where the Tekken Force is under attack from G Corp. While defending the soldiers, he faces off against his former partner in the Tekken Force, Nina, who was sent to retrieve data from inside the base. After their fight, she deceitfully leaves with no intent of wanting to cause any serious harm, only to return moments later and attempt to kill the Tekken Force soldiers and Eddy with a group of self-destructing Jack-7s, but Eddy manages to save himself and the soldiers to later recruit them in the war against G-Corp. He informs Lidia about the encounter, as well as a group of mysterious monks they've been investigating who have also shown up to battle G-Corp forces.

Two months later, Lidia led UN Forces in the relief efforts in New York after Jin and Kazuya's battle in Manhattan. She was able to accomplish this quickly thanks to some leaked intel on G-Corp from Reina, with the help, whom she battles before the tournament after learning she's connected to Heihachi, with the information Reina gathered comes from the second Kunimitsu, off-screen. After Reina leaves, Lidia is tested by the mysterious warriors known as the Tekken Monks, who request her services after determining she's of sound body and mind to assist their latest recruit, Heihachi Mishima.

The Tekken Monks are descendants of an ancient clan devoted to Buddhist teachings and restoring the purity of the Mishima fighting style. After Heihachi was defeated by Kazuya in their previous battle, the high priest of the monks, Seiryu, rescued him just before his body hit the lava and helped him recover, as well as faking his death from the public, including Reina. With Heihachi having developed amnesia from the fight, the monks aim to have him master the ultimate Mishima technique, which requires a pure heart. Thanks to training alongside Lidia and defeating his inner demons, Heihachi is able to achieve control over his mind, body, and technique. For his final task, the Star Crusher Trial, he must destroy a meteorite that falls once every 200 years. Before he goes, he agrees to help Lidia in their fight against Kazuya.

The meteorite that approaches Heihachi in the Star Crusher Trial ended up being debris that came as a result of Jin and Kazuya's battle in space. Heihachi catches the meteorite and headbutts it, successfully mastering the ultimate Mishima technique. However, doing so also restored his lost memories, reverting him back to his evil ways. He kills the Tekken Monks before testing his new technique on Yoshimitsu, Eddy, and Lidia. After defeating them, he vows to stop Kazuya and will enact the next part of his plan once Reina awakens her Devil Gene.

== Characters ==
There is currently a total of 44 playable characters. There were 32 announced for the base roster of Tekken 8. The game includes four additional characters to the roster with each downloadable season pass. In addition, there are two unplayable boss characters, Azazel and Devil Kazuya in his true form, as well as an event-only playable character that is also one of the final unplayable opponents in Arcade Mode. Harada commented (in early 2024) that guest characters had not yet been considered, but acknowledged the demand from fans for the inclusion of Kazuma Kiryu from the Like a Dragon series who was previously the most requested guest character in Tekken 7, as well as Tifa Lockhart from Final Fantasy. The first guest character, Clive Rosfield from Final Fantasy XVI, was released in December 2024. The second guest character, Yujiro Hanma from Baki the Grappler, will be released in early 2027.

=== New characters ===
- Angel Jin ^{a}: The angelic transformation of Jin Kazama and a purified form of his devil counterpart, imbued with the Kazama purification powers.
- Azucena Milagros Ortiz Castillo: A fearless happy-go-lucky Peruvian mixed martial artist and daughter of a coffee company owner.
- Clive Rosfield ^{e} ^{f}: The main protagonist of Square Enix's Final Fantasy XVI. He is the firstborn son of the Archduke Elwin Rosfield of Rosaria, and the dominant host of an Eikon named Ifrit. In battle, he is accompanied by his pet wolf, Torgal, and borrows other Eikons' powers, such as Phoenix from his younger brother, Joshua.
- JACK-8: The latest upgrade of the G Corporation's JACK model, with a new voice and look.
- Nomenjanahary Miary Zo Andrianavalona ^{e}: A curious lover of animals and their habitats who discovered martial arts by mimicking their movements. She shares a close bond with two ring-tailed lemurs, a parent "Vanilla" and a child "Cacao". She uses the powers of a different silver-colored Ogre. Her fighting style is Moraingy and other African martial arts.
- Reina: A mysterious purple-clad teenager who studies at Mishima Polytechnic. Due to possessing a Devil Gene, along with a journal revealing Heihachi Mishima's massacre on the Hachijo Clan since Kazumi's failed assassination attempt on him, Reina is suspected to be related to a sole surviving Hachijo baby whom Heihachi spared, leaving her relation as his daughter to be ambiguous. She uses a fake alias "Yaotome" to cover her relation to Heihachi from the public. She practices Mishima Style Karate, in addition to Taidō.
- Victor Chevalier: A legendary war veteran, admiral, and United Nations super spy from a royal French knight lineage, and the founding grandmaster of Raven Unit with the codename of "Phantom Raven", though he does not use it. He is a close quarters battler who wields both knife and karambit for his default combat, and a technology which grants him a teleportation ability, and enhances his weaponized pistol, grenades and a sheathed katana called "Takemikazuchi".
- Yujiro Hanma ^{e} ^{f}: The main antagonist of the Baki the Grappler manga and anime series. He is the father of series protagonist Baki Hanma. ^{(upcoming; early 2027)}

=== Returning characters ===
- Alisa Bosconovitch
- Anna Williams ^{e}
- Armor King II ^{e}
- Asuka Kazama
- Azazel ^{b}
- Bob Richards ^{e}
- Bryan Fury
- Claudio Serafino
- Devil Jin
- Eddy Gordo ^{e}
- Fahkumram ^{e}
- Feng Wei
- Heihachi Mishima ^{e}
- Hwoarang
- JACK-7 ^{c}
- Jin Kazama
- Jun Kazama
- Kazuya Mishima / Devil Kazuya ^{d}
- King II
- Kuma II
- Kunimitsu II ^{e}
- Lars Alexandersson
- Lee Chaolan
- Leo Kliesen
- Leroy Smith
- Lidia Sobieska ^{e}
- Lili De Rochefort
- Ling Xiaoyu
- Marshall Law
- Nina Williams
- Panda
- Paul Phoenix
- Raven
- Roger Jr. ^{e}
- Sergei Dragunov
- Shaheen
- Steve Fox
- Yoshimitsu
- Zafina

^a Playable only during the story mode, unplayable boss
^b Unplayable boss
^c Unplayable enemy during the story mode, appears as a palette swap for JACK-8
^d Heat State transformation
^e Downloadable character
^f Guest character

== Development ==
Development of Tekken 8 was first teased in August 2022 at Evo 2022, with an official presentation made the following month at Sony's State of Play event. Tekken 8 was revealed with a fight between Jin and his father Kazuya, which has been building up for several years. While Jin already faced his relatives in previous games from the franchise, he is shown in a major conflict with his Devil Gene as it keeps absorbing his humanity to the point he becomes Devil Jin in the middle of the fight. However, Harada remarked that the final scene of the trailer involving broken chains act as symbolism to Jin breaking free from the conflicts he has been connected to for several games. A common interpretation of Jin's mother Jun Kazama's fate is that she was killed before the events of Tekken 3. This is explored in a story from Jin's point of view and is a belief that most gamers shared. However, Jin and the gamers were actually incorrect—Jun is missing. As a result, Harada explained that as far as the rivalry between Jin and Kazuya is concerned, Jun would be present at their eventual confrontation. Although Jin returns as the hero of the story mode, he noted that such protagonist became unpopular within the fandom because he rewrote him as a villain in Tekken 6. According to Harada, the story mode was written to be accessible to newcomers, emphasizing cinematics and battles different from common battles in fighting games. Harada repeated this statement with Arcade quest that plays different from previous arcade modes as it welcomes unskilled players. A special mode was given to every character to generate more damage. Once her return to the series was revealed, Harada was pleased with the addition of Jun Kazama to the cast.

Harada emphasized Tekken roster evolved to include characters with more dialogue and personality ever since early installments. While they were working on Tekken 3, game directors Masamichi Abe, Yutaka Kounoe, Harada, and the rest of the development team noticed the decline of the arcade market. To entice console owners to play Tekken 3, they decided that the console version would include mini-games. These games highlight the cast in a different manner like Yoshimitsu and Bryan Fury. In order to further develop these characters since Tekken 3 until Tekken 8, Namco kept detailing facial expressions and lip-synch. These were highly important into developing mainstay Nina Williams and newcomer Reina who can often exchange lines.

Advocates for accessibility have reported that Tekken 8's options for colorblind or disabled audiences could result in moderate to severe health issues including vertigo and migraines. In an article by Eurogamer, Harada was portrayed as dismissing these concerns as a misunderstanding by "very few" people who were unfamiliar with the game's accessibility options or how they appear in-game. However, the article also highlighted accessibility specialist Ian Hamilton's response to Harada's apparent attempt to minimize Hamilton's concerns: "I have not 'misunderstood the accessibility options we are trying, or have only seen the video without actually trying them out in the demo play'. I understand very well, and have tried them in demo play. I'm trying to help you avoid harming players and provide a good experience." The settings were updated for the release version to avoid potential health issues. Due to changes in the game industry, Harada claims that putting animal fighters was hard to the new installment, leaving the decision to make Panda and Kuma the same but with different skins. This was also done due to the team's desire to put everybody's favorite characters from the fandom without making the group feel overworked form making several characters. Meanwhile, downloadable characters were up to decide based on negotiations with other companies and if agreements. The team was satisfied by the game's lifecycle as they find it is going faster than Tekken 7. Game mechanics were also revised since the game was revealed in order to fit people's desire with a 3D fighting game, especially the handling of special moves.

Tekken 8's theme song "Mastery" is performed by The Last Rockstars. An official soundtrack was pre-released digitally on the same day as the game's release, and was released physically in four CDs on March 13, 2024.

== Marketing ==
=== Pre-release content ===
Tekken 8 was teased in August 2022 at the EVO 2022 convention, where a live tournament of Tekken 7 was held; the teaser featured an archival snippet of Kazuya Mishima from the series' first entry, which transitioned into a recent close-up visual of him. The game was formally announced on September 13, 2022, at Sony's State of Play presentation. The accompanying visual preview showed Mishima and his son, Jin Kazama, fighting on an undisclosed stage in the game. Katsuhiro Harada confirmed that Tekken 8 will focus on the conclusion of Kazuya and Jin's ongoing conflict. Regarding the games first set of trailers, Harada commented, "This is not footage created solely for trailer purposes, but an actual real-time rendering of what is happening on the game screen."

Following the Tekken World Tour 2022 finals, it was announced that Arika would be handling the game's ongoing development, with the exception of rollback netcode, including the recent Tekken 7 patch. Arika, a video game company founded by former Street Fighter employees in 1995, responsible for the Street Fighter EX and Fighting Layer series, are handling updates for Tekken 7 as well as some development for Tekken 8. Bandai Namco Entertainment released their financial report in 2022, stating that they expected the game to be released in 2023. At The Game Awards 2022 in December 2022, Bandai Namco unveiled the first Tekken 8 game trailer, which included new stages, mechanisms, and story details. The trailer included Mishima and Kazama, as well as recurring characters Paul Phoenix, King, Marshall Law, Lars Alexandersson, Jack-8, and Jun Kazama, who last appeared in Tekken 2 in 1995.

Nina Williams was the game's first character trailer, released in February 2023. Due to her inclusion, Williams, along with Phoenix, has the most appearances in the Tekken series, having appeared in every entry. Mishima's trailer was released the same month on Bandai Namco's YouTube channel. In March 2023, character trailers for Phoenix, Law, King, Alexandersson, Jack-8, and Kazama were released. Between April and May, character trailers for Ling Xiaoyu, Leroy Smith, Asuka Kazama, Lili, Hwoarang, and Bryan Fury were released. In July 2023, Bandai Namco announced plans to conduct a closed network test. Prior to its official release, the test aimed to assess various game aspects such as balance, matchmaking, and overall stability. This closed network test was open to a limited number of players on a first-come, first-served basis.

Between July and August 2023, three character trailers launched: Claudio Serafino, Raven, and a new character, Azucena. On August 23, a special trailer premiered, featuring the majority of the game's previously announced content, as well as a release date, pre-order information, and exclusive content related to the game's features. Between September and December 2023, Bandai Namco's channel featured trailers for Feng Wei, Devil Jin, new characters Victor Chevalier and Reina, Leo, Steve Fox, Dragunov and Yoshimitsu; Yoshimitsu tied Williams and Phoenix for the most entries in the Tekken series. A second network test was later conducted in October 2023.

On December 14, 2023, Bandai Namco released a demo of Tekken 8 for the PlayStation 5 and December 21, 2023, for the Xbox Series X/S and Microsoft Windows platforms. It includes the first Story Mode and Arcade Quest chapter, as well as Super Ghost Battle, Versus Mode, and the Gallery. Four characters (Jin Kazama, Mishima, Phoenix, and Williams) and three stages (Urban Square (Evening), Yakushima, and Sanctum) were made available. Yohei Shimbori, who previously worked for Team Ninja on the Dead or Alive series, joined the project as an assistant director and producer until his departure at the end of August 2025.

In January 2024, two trailers were released: the story mode and a visual that contained exclusive content for the game's Ultimate Edition package. Over the course of the month, character trailers for Shaheen, Kuma, Panda, Alisa Bosconovitch, Zafina, Lee Chaolan, and Devil Jin were released. To conclude the game's pre-release, a final launch trailer was released on January 19, 2024.

=== Packaging and additional content ===
Tekken 8 was released on January 26, 2024, for PlayStation 5, Microsoft Windows, and Xbox Series X/S, and marks the eighth canon release and tenth overall entry in the Tekken series. To promote the games release, Bandai Namco Entertainment distributed the game in seven different formats. The standard edition (both digital and physical) includes a Paul Phoenix avatar set, whereas the Launch Edition includes steel-book packaging, a burning chain metal plate, and corporation stickers. The digital deluxe version includes a one-year season pass with access to downloadable content for four characters (Eddy Gordo, Lidia Sobieska, Heihachi Mishima, and a guest character from Final Fantasy XVI, Clive Rosfield), while the ultimate edition (digital and physical versions) has the same features as the launch edition and digital deluxe version, as well as access to various character and avatar skins.

Two collectors editions were released: a standard collectors edition and a premium collectors edition. Both formats include the same content as the Ultimate Editions, as well as the game packaged in a boxset, eight glossy collector cards, two arcade tokens, a metal ring inspired by the aesthetic of character Leroy Smith, and a figurine of Jin Kazama (the premium edition includes an electrified mechanism that causes the statue to light up). Bandai Namco distributed a pin badge for video game pre-orders across Asia. Ultimately, the Paul Phoenix avatar set was included with all pre-orders for existing formats.

The first season pass was revealed during the initial promotional activity for Tekken 8, and it would include four downloadable characters for purchase. Eddy Gordo was the first revealed character in January 2024; and was released on the first week of April 2024. Following that, each remaining character was revealed quarterly throughout 2024, such as Lidia, who was revealed in EVO Japan 2024 and was released in late July 2024, after Heihachi was revealed in the same month during EVO 2024, who released alongside a story expansion in October 2024. In February 2024, a microtransaction shop called Tekken Shop was added to the game. In it, players can buy cosmetic items with "Tekken Coins" which can only be purchased in bundles with real money.

In December 2024, the same month as Clive's confirmation as the last fighter for the first season pass, the second season pass was announced. The end of the Season 2 teaser trailer shows a red helicopter with a black rose mark and two pairs of rocket with lipstick marks referencing Anna Williams's appearance in Tekken 5 before her reveal in February 2025 alongside Fahkumram, Armor King II and a new character Miary Zo. Clive's inclusion also adds Joshua Rosfield and Jill Warrick's costumes.

== Reception ==
Reception

Aggregate scores
Aggregator	Score
Metacritic	(PC) 91/100 (PS5) 90/100 (XSXS) 89/100
OpenCritic	99%

Review scores
Publication	Score
Digital Trends	4/5
Eurogamer	5/5
Famitsu	36/40
Game Informer	8.25/10
GameSpot	8/10
GamesRadar+	5/5
Hardcore Gamer	5/5
IGN	9/10
Jeuxvideo.com	18/20
NME	4/5
PC Gamer (US)	89/100
PCGamesN	9/10
Push Square	9/10
Shacknews	10/10
Video Games Chronicle	5/5
VG247	5/5
VideoGamer.com	10/10

Tekken 8 received "universal acclaim" from critics for the PC and PS5 versions, while the Xbox Series X/S version received "generally favorable reviews", according to review aggregator website OpenCritic, as well as Metacritic. Several publications argued that Tekken 8 was the best offering from the parent franchise. GamesRadar+ rated it five stars, stating that "proves that plenty of depth makes for a vibrant fighter, justifying its current-gen exclusivity to deliver a skull-thrasher that really feels like an evolution rather than a simple update." Hardcore Gamer praised the game as "bold" and highlighted Bandai Namco's sense of innovation, describing it as "one of the greatest fighting games of all time." Shacknews compared the game to its previous entries and concluded: "Tekken 8 is it, and looks set to carry that torch for years to come." Video Games Chronicle opined that Tekken 8 is "up there with Tekken 3 as one of the most exciting high points in the series." PC Gamer vows the game to seamlessly combine nostalgia-inducing moments into an exceptionally approachable and beginner-friendly package.

Critics praised the game's improved visuals and overall progression from previous installments. Eurogamer Germany wrote, "It looks great after the graphical redesign and is packed with game variants and training options as well as clever ideas." Despite praising the graphics, GamePro Germany felt that the game lacked options for "single-player fans." Despite minor "tweaks" in customization, IGN felt that "Tekken 8 manages to stand out as something special." Jeuxvideo.com compared the game favorably to other entries in the fighting game genre, saying "Its new features in terms of gameplay are enough to stand out from previous opuses and hold its own against its competitors". NME praised its visuals and cinematography, writing, "Tekken 8 has lots to offer both new and veteran players. The cinematic, over-the-top storyline is gorgeous and ends in a thematically brilliant fight".

Minor criticism was directed at specific modes, as well as the game's overall innovation. PC Gamer specifically pointed out the lack of offline modes which were featured in previous games, such as Team Battle, Survival, and Time Attack. Gamer.nl wrote that "The new Tekken does not want to reinvent the wheel, but relies entirely on the rock-solid gameplay for which the series is known." 4Players.de described the modes as the game's only weakness, while also praising the game's "high-quality fighting action." Despite praise for the game's "flashy combos and air juggles", Game Informer wrote that "Tekken 8 doesn't reach the heights of recent rivals like Street Fighter 6 and Mortal Kombat 1." GLHF of Sports Illustrated came to a mixed conclusion, believing it was "designed primarily to appease an existing audience, not court a new one."

The introduction of a battle pass system post-launch was also criticized by the community. Katsuhiro Harada released a statement that the battle pass system was necessary to support ongoing updates of the game. The Season 2 patch, which brought significant balance changes, was criticized by the community as well. The patch's character changes encouraged more aggressive offense after several complaints over the lack of defensive options the game had compared to older titles. These changes were also directly opposed to earlier communication that the Season 2 changes would be "defense focused." Two weeks after Season 2 launched, Bandai Namco launched an emergency patch to implement more defensive options. Director Kohei Ikeda issued a public apology for the drastic changes in Season 2's launch and promised players that future updates will implement their feedback.

=== Sales ===
Tekken 8 topped the charts in the UK upon its initial release, outperforming the 2023 release of Street Fighter 6. Sales were reportedly double of the latter. Bandai Namco generated over $13 million in the game's first 10 days on sale on Steam. On February 26, Bandai Namco announced that the game sold over two million copies in the first month after launch. About a year later in February 2025, sales of 3 million were announced.

=== Awards ===
Year	Ceremony	Category	Result	Ref.
2023	The Game Awards 2023	Most Anticipated Game	Nominated	
2024	Golden Joystick Awards	Ultimate Game of the Year	Nominated	
2024	Golden Joystick Awards	Best Multiplayer Game	Nominated	
2024	The Streamer Awards	Stream Game of the Year	Nominated	
2024	The Game Awards 2024	Best Fighting Game	Won	
2024	The Game Awards 2024	Best Multiplayer Game	Nominated	
2024	The Steam Awards	Best Game You Suck At	Nominated	
2025	28th Annual D.I.C.E. Awards	Fighting Game of the Year	Won	
2025	25th Game Developers Choice Awards	Best Technology	Honorable mention	
2025	21st British Academy Games Awards	Multiplayer	Nominated	
