= Dion Lesage =

- Final Fantasy character
- Dion Lesage in Final Fantasy XVI
- First game: Final Fantasy XVI (2023)
- Voiced by: EN: Stewart Clarke; JA: Yuichi Nakamura

Dion Lesage (ディオン・ルサージュ, Dion Rusāju) is a character in the 2023 video game Final Fantasy XVI. He is one of its main characters, the Dominant of Bahamut, the son of the Emperor Sylvestre Lesage and lover of Sir Terence. He was designed as a reflection of the game's protagonist, Clive Rosfield, who was described as a darker character compared to Dion being an "all-around Superman."

Dion has received praise from both critics and fans alike for his sexuality, particularly his romance with Terence. He is the first main character to be openly gay and he was positively received. The depiction was mostly received well for its subtlety.

== Concept and creation ==
During development of Final Fantasy XVI, there were rumors that the game would include gay characters, eventually turning out to be true with the inclusion of Dion Lesage, as well as his lover Terence. Creative director Kazutoyo Maehiro discussed Dion as a contrast to the protagonist, Clive Rosfield; where Clive has a "somewhat dark atmosphere, having sworn revenge," Dion reflects this, depicted as a "traditional image of a prince" and an "all-around Superman."

Dion is portrayed by Stewart Clarke in English. He described him as "the epitome of dutiful, wedded to his people and what his Kingdom expects of him." One of his favorite things about his portrayal of Dion was his "frighteningly passionate inner conflict in the scenes with his father, battling the hierarchy and honor he feels he has to uphold versus the very real instinct that his father has begun acting against the futures of the very people he is meant to serve." He was excited to portray the first openly gay main character in the Final Fantasy series, describing that his sexuality did not define Dion despite being a significant aspect of Dion's character. He particularly enjoyed the fact that it was not an aspect that was left open for interpretation.

== Appearances ==
Dion appears in the video game Final Fantasy XVI as one of its main characters. He is the leader of the Holy Order of the Knights Dragoon, whose main role is protecting the holy emperor, Dion's father, Sylvestre Lesage, with whom Dion has a strained relationship. Dion is the Dominant of Bahamut, the Eikon of light, and is revered by the empire who consider dragons to be holy creatures. He also forms a romance with his second-in-command, Terence. Throughout the first half of the game, Dion's relationship with his father is strained thanks to the manipulations of his stepmother Anabella, who schemes to have her son Olivier replace Dion as Sylvestre's successor. Joshua Rosfield eventually persuades Dion to launch a coup against Anabella, which goes awry when Dion accidentally kills Sylvestre while trying to dispose of Olivier. In Dion's despair, Olivier (actually a vessel for Ultima) goads him into transforming into Bahamut and rampaging across his kingdom. Clive and Joshua engage Dion in their Eikon forms, during which Bahamut absorbed the kingdom's Mothercrystal to gain more power, but was eventually defeated after a final skirmish in outer space.

Returning to the kingdom, Dion killed Olivier to avenge his father, driving Anabella to commit suicide. Now determined to atone for his actions, he bids farewell to Terence and volunteers to join Clive and Joshua's assault on Ultima's fortress, Origin. As Bahamut, Dion manages to get the Rosfield brothers past the defenses, but Bahamut was ultimately defeated while destroying Ultima's "Ultima Prime" form and Dion fell from Origin presumably to his death.

== Reception ==
Dion has generally been well received by critics, nominated for Best LGBTQ Character by Gaymer Magazine. He has also been popular with fans of Final Fantasy. Game Rant writer Jared Carvalho appreciated that he was explicitly gay, contrasting him to characters they considered queer-coded like Fang and Vanille. He also appreciated that, despite the tendency of queer-coded characters in Final Fantasy being villains, Dion was a hero. Eurogamer writer Ed Nightingale discussed how Dion made him "finally [feel] seen by [Final Fantasy," appreciating how subtle it was. He noted how it was "authentic [and] normalized," praising it for not being sexualized and not needing to explain his sexuality. He also argued that the game's Game of Thrones inspiration informed his sexuality, comparing him and his lover Terence to characters Renly Baratheon and Loras Tyrell. Pride.com writer Justin Wood praised the inclusion of both Dion and Terence in the game, appreciating that they were powerful main characters in the story. He also appreciated that their sexuality was not what defined their characters, He expressed a desire to see the industry follow suit with representation of LGBT people.

Kotaku writer Kenneth Shepard was less enthusiastic about the portrayal, noting how Terence seemed characterized by his locality to Dion, which he felt was a missed opportunity. However, he still enjoyed the relationship, finding the "desperation and undying loyalty" Terence holds for Dion captivating. He also appreciated how Dion, despite being a member of a "family dynamic [defined by] destructive fantasy politics made corporeal," broke the cycle and avoided falling into "toxic, abusive tropes." Despite the things he appreciated about the couple, Shepard felt that the depiction of their romance was not handled the same as straight romance in the game, discussing how their kiss was viewed from a distance unlike other romance scenes. He also begrudged the fact that the two were separate for a large portion of the game, arguing that while Dion pushing Terence away to keep him safe near the end of the game was a "beautiful, tragic, angsty moment," the lack of foregrounding of the relationship made it disappointing. He felt that Square Enix was reticent to do more with a gay relationship than this was a symptom of a larger issue of the industry with gay representation.

TechRadar writer Cat Bussell, despite worrying he would be "profoundly boring – a posturing, macho warrior who lives and dies by only the blandest sort of violence," she enjoyed his character, describing him as "sensitive" and "soulful." She praised his English vocal performance, discussing a particular scene where Dion expressed a "compelling cocktail of love for his aide, resentment of his father and fear for his future." She noted how this was a step forward for Square Enix, where queerness was previously only implied and not explicit. However, she was critical of the game for killing off Dion, feeling that it was an example of the "bury your gays" trope, which reflects the propensity of writers to kill off gay characters. Despite all that, she felt that it was still a positive portrayal, particularly due to issues facing gay people in Japan, such as gay marriage being banned.

Final Fantasy XVI was banned in Saudi Arabia due to Square Enix's unwillingness to modify the game's content; critics speculated that the presence of a gay character, particularly Dion, was part of the reason for the ban.
