= Ananda Jacobs =

American actress and musician

- Born: Ananda Dawn Jacobs; 12 March 1983 (age 43); Los Angeles, California, U.S.
- Occupations: Actress; singer-songwriter; model; composer; producer
- Years active: 2006–present
- Height: 165 cm (5 ft 5 in)
- Website: anandajacobs.com

Ananda Dawn Jacobs (born March 12, 1983) is an American actress, singer, model, producer, and composer.

== Early life ==
Jacobs was born in Los Angeles, California. She grew up in Arizona and Washington. She has three sisters, Starlet, who is an artist, Nova, who is a writer, and Moksha, who is also an actress. In 2004, she graduated from University of Southern California with a double degree in psychology and music.

== Personal life ==
In 2006, she moved to Japan where she started her career as an actress and voice actor.

== Career ==
Jacobs is represented in Japan as an actress and narrator by Free Wave CO., Ltd.

== Filmography ==
=== Film ===
Year	Title	Role	Notes
2009	Hijoshi zukan	Catherine	
2012	Thermae Romae	Livia	
2014	The Vancouver Asahi	Emmy's Teacher	
2015	Equals	Receptionist	
2016	Shuriken Buzz	Karen	
2016	Solid Time		Short film
2024	Hey Handsome!!	Nancy	

=== Television ===
Year	Title	Role	Notes
2010	English Teachers	Jodi	Main role, webseries
2011	Walking Eyes Arukumedis	Art	Episode: "Glee n"
2013	Yae no Sakura	Alice Starkweather	6 episodes
2013	Shûden Bye Bye	American Tourist	Episode: "Minami -Senju Station"
2014	Team Medical Dragon	Emily	Season 4, Episode 09
2014–15	Massan	Helen	5 episodes
2015–17	Ei Ei Go!	Lucy	Main role
2016	Beppinsan	Christina	2 episodes
2017	The English Bar	Foreign Woman	1 episode
2019	Tenjin Spy	Jasmine	Episode: "Tenjin's Holiday"
2019	Doctor-X: Surgeon Michiko Daimon	Natalie Goldberg	Season 6, Episode 7
2023	Ranman	Clara Lawrence	Asadora
2024	Talentless Takano	Foreign woman	Episode 1
2024	The Travel Nurse	Doctor	3 episodes

=== Video game ===
Year	Title	Role	Notes
2015	Resident Evil: Revelations 2	Claire Redfield	Motion capture
2015–17	Tekken 7	Josie Rizal	Voice, Uncredited
2016	Pokkén Tournament	Nia	Voice, English version
2017	Resident Evil 7: Biohazard	Zoe Baker	Face model
2018	Metal Gear Survive	Virgil AT-9	Voice, English version
2018	The Missing: J.J. Macfield and the Island of Memories	Emily	Voice
