= Bahamut (Final Fantasy) =

Final Fantasy character

- Final Fantasy character
- Bahamut concept art for Final Fantasy III
- First game: Final Fantasy (1987)
- Designed by: Yoshitaka Amano (Final Fantasy III)
- Voiced by: EN: Debi Derryberry (Final Fantasy X); David Lodge (Final Fantasy XV); Stewart Clarke (Final Fantasy XVI); JA: Rio Natsuki (Final Fantasy X); Itaru Yamamoto (Final Fantasy XV); Yuichi Nakamura (Final Fantasy XVI)

Bahamut is a character in the Final Fantasy series. He is introduced in the first entry, where he assists the player in upgrading their characters. In future appearances, he appears in different roles, from a supporting character to an antagonist, as well as a summonable creature who can aid the player in battle beginning with Final Fantasy III. His form often changes between games, and variants of Bahamut exist, including Neo Bahamut and Bahamut Zero in Final Fantasy VII.

His appearance in Final Fantasy III was designed by Yoshitaka Amano, and this design was translated into sprite form by Kazuko Shibuya. Amano was unaware of the appearance of the mythological Bahamut having a sheep's head, stating that he made him into a "mecha dragon" and believing that he contributed to Japanese people's perception of Bahamut. Bahamut has received generally positive reception, considered one of the best summons in the series and multiple moments by Bahamut across the series being considered impactful.

== Appearances ==
In the first Final Fantasy video game, Bahamut appears as a non-playable character who empowers the player's party members. In Final Fantasy III, the player is able to battle against Bahamut; upon defeating him, he becomes a character the player can summon to aid them in battle. He appears in future Final Fantasy games as a boss, summon, or both; in Final Fantasy VII, Bahamut appears alongside "Neo Bahamut" and "Bahamut ZERO", more powerful versions, as a summon. In Final Fantasy IX, Bahamut is a summon that exists within the character Garnet, whose mother, Queen Brahne, uses to betray the antagonist Kuja, only for him to take control, using Bahamut to kill her. He later attempts to destroy Garnet's kingdom with Bahamut, but Garnet and fellow summoner Eiko summon the creature Alexander, defeating Bahamut. In Final Fantasy X, Bahamut appears as a young boy who guides protagonist Tidus through the world of Spira. He is eventually accessible as a summonable ally in combat and helping Yuna defeat Sin. A variant of Bahamut appears in Final Fantasy X-2 called Dark Bahamut, having been corrupted. Bahamut also appears in Final Fantasy XI as an Avatar, though he is unable to be summoned by players and is a prominent figure in the Chains of Promathia storyline. Although Bahamut does not make an appearance in Final Fantasy XII, the Sky Fortress Bahamut serves as the game's final dungeon; additionally, the final boss the Undying, the merged form of antagonists Vayne Carudas Solidor and the rogue Occuria Venat, uses abilities associated with Bahamut during the battle. Bahamut makes an appearance as a boss and unlockable summon in the sequel Final Fantasy XII: Revenant Wings. In Final Fantasy XIII, Bahamut can be summoned by the character Oerba Yun Fang.

In Final Fantasy XIV, Bahamut appears as a primal known as the "Dreadwyrm" and was used to explain the changes from the original release to A Realm Reborn by destroying much of the game world. His fate is later explored in the Coils of Bahamut raid series that serve as both endgame activities and an epilogue to the original game, while Bahamut himself is the final boss of the overall storyline. Bahamut is also an optional superboss in the Unending Coil of Bahamut (Ultimate) raid in the Stormblood expansion, where players must clear a gauntlet consisting of multiple bosses and phases from the Coils of Bahamut raid series before eventually defeating a more powerful version of Bahamut. Player Summoners can also use abilities associated with Bahamut, including summoning an aspect of the Dreadwyrm to aid them in battle. A stronger variation called Solar Bahamut can be summoned as well.

In Final Fantasy XV, Bahamut is instead depicted as a male humanoid in draconic armor with wings made of swords. Within the game's story, he is the God of War known as "the Draconian" who granted the powers of the Oracle to the bloodline of Lunafreya Nox Fleuret, and gave the Ring of the Lucii and the Crystal to his chosen king, with the game's protagonist Noctis Lucis Caelum being the latest in that bloodline. He can only be summoned during a scripted encounter at the end of the game. Expanded media, particularly Final Fantasy XV: The Dawn of the Future, the novelization of the second season of cancelled downloadable content, depicts him as a ruthless antagonist uncaring towards mortal lives and viewing himself as the supreme ruler of the world alone.

In Final Fantasy XVI, Bahamut is the Eikon of Light whose powers manifest within Dominants part of the bloodline of the royal family of Sanbreque, with the current host being the crown prince Dion Lesage. During the story, Dion stages a coup and attempts to kill his half-brother Olivier, whom he deduced as a puppet for the game's antagonist Ultima; in doing so, he accidentally kills his father Sylvestre, causing Ultima through Olivier to goad Dion and lose control over his powers. Dion transforms into Bahamut and goes on a rampage through the city of Twinside, though he is stopped by Clive and Joshua Rosfield with the former absorbing a portion of Bahamut's powers from Dion. Later, he joins the brothers in their quest to defeat Ultima and destroy the Mothercrystals to atone for his rampage at Twinside, transforming into Bahamut again to assault his floating fortress of Origin. The three attempt to harm Ultima, with none of their attacks having any effect on him; Dion sacrifices himself to protect Joshua from Ultima's attacks, presumably falling to his death. After Clive destroys the final Mothercrystal within Origin, all magic as well as Eikons, including Bahamut, cease to exist in the world.

In Final Fantasy Type-0, Bahamut appears as a summonable character, able to be summoned by the player sacrificing one of their characters.

Bahamut has been the subject of multiple pieces of merchandise and promotional events. In the Final Fantasy-themed Magic: The Gathering set, a card based on Bahamut was featured. An official disco-themed party was held in 2017 at the Huis Ten Bosch theme park in Sasebo, Nagasaki called Bahamut Disco, a virtual reality event in a "450-degree" video space. A projection of Bahamut flying through Yokohama was also done to promote Final Fantasy XIV.

== Concept and creation ==
In Final Fantasy III, Bahamut was sketched by character artist Yoshitaka Amano, which were then translated into in-game sprites by Kazuko Shibuya. Shibuya commented that she made Bahamut and other similar characters larger in order to better match Amano's art, remarking that she found Bahamut to be a particularly enjoyable sprite to design. When designing Bahamut, Amano stated that he was unaware that Bahamut had a sheep's head, and designed him like a "mecha dragon". He believed that this decision contributed to Japanese people's perception of Bahamut, and demonstrated the impact of the Final Fantasy franchise. The first depiction of a dragon-like Bahamut was in Dungeons & Dragons, the name borrowed from Islamic cosmological lore. Bahamut in Arabic tradition is described as being a giant fish and part of the strata of the world.

In Final Fantasy VII, a braid-like protrusion was originally added to his design, but it was removed in the final product to give to Neo Bahamut instead. The cutscene for its Mega Flare attack was based on the 3D tech demo for Final Fantasy VI. Bahamut Zero has a similar design to Bahamut, except more angular and having six wings. It was the first summon in the series to have its attack be set in space. For Final Fantasy VII: Advent Children, the battle between Cloud Strife's group and Bahamut was the most difficult to design due to the size of the area and the number of objects the staff had to add to the scene to keep it realistic. The alternating positions of the characters, including Bahamut itself, took the staff a long time to complete to give the scene a sense of flow.

== Reception ==
Dengeki writer Kawachi spoke of how significant a moment it was to defeat Bahamut in Final Fantasy III after failing to do so when he attempted earlier, ignoring the prompting to run. He also found it exciting to be able to summon Bahamut to use Mega Flare, stating that this experience made Bahamut's appearance in future games exciting for him. Kawachi, commenting on his incarnation in Final Fantasy VII, expressing disappointment that he didn't stand out as much due to being outclassed by Knights of the Round, another summon in the game. Den of Geek writer Jason M. Gallagher considered multiple moments involving Bahamut to be among the series best, including in the original Final Fantasy and Final Fantasy IX. He found the battle between Bahamut and Alexander in IX particularly striking due to the sheer scale of the combatants and the fact that Bahamut lost the fight in the end, which he considered rare. He also found the original appearance striking, due to him transforming the player's characters into "mighty warriors". He considered this one of the first "wow" moments in the series.

Various fights with Bahamut received praise from critics. Game Informer staff regarded the battle against Bahamut in Final Fantasy XVI as the best boss battle of 2023, praising it for having high-quality visuals and sequences. In the book "50 Years of Boss Fights: Video Game Legends", author Daryl Baxter felt that part of what made the battle with Bahamut in Final Fantasy VIII stand out so much was that it was a secret boss that, if beaten, impacted future boss fights significantly by making them easier. He noted how difficult a fight this is, also commenting that it was unusual for a boss fight to have as much dialogue from the boss as Bahamut has. He believed that completing the quest to find Bahamut and managing to defeat him in battle was a rewarding journey that did not make the player too powerful.

Writer Drew Mackie believed that Bahamut was based on the Dungeons & Dragons character of the same name, which was depicted as a dragon king. He argued that the inclusion of the dragon Tiamat as an antagonist in Final Fantasy reflected Bahamut and Tiamat being opposing forces in Dungeons & Dragons. He also discussed the "conceptual shift" that caused it to become more recognizable as a dragon than its original incarnation.

Donald Duck in the Kingdom Hearts series was considered the strongest magic user in the Final Fantasy world due to his ability to use the spell Zettaflare, the most powerful spell in the series and a spell no other character had utilized prior. Critics noted that Bahamut was able to match or surpass Donald once he gained the ability to use Zettaflare in Final Fantasy XVI.
