= Josie Rizal =

Tekken character

- Tekken character
- Josie Rizal in Tekken 7
- First appearance: Tekken 7 (2015)
- Designed by: Mari Shimazaki
- Voiced by: Ananda Jacobs

In-universe information
- Fighting style: Kickboxing and eskrima
- Origin: Philippines
- Nationality: Filipino

Josie Rizal (Japanese: ジョシー・リサール, Hepburn: Joshī Risāru) is a fictional character from the Tekken fighting game franchise by Bandai Namco Entertainment, making her debut, and so far, only appearance, in Tekken 7. A professional kickboxer who practices the Filipino fighting style eskrima, Josie hopes to join the Tekken Force, an organization that has helped her country. She was designed by Mari Shimazaki and voiced by Ananda Jacobs.

Josie has received mixed reception. Her design and characterization were the subject of criticism, with multiple critics arguing that her character design fails to incorporate elements that could be meaningfully described as Filipino. Despite this, she trended on Twitter and was popular with Filipino users of the website.

== Creation and gameplay ==
Josie Rizal is a young woman from the Philippines. She wears a yellow top, a blue miniskirt, and a red rabbit ear-like hair accessory. Her costume color and other elements of her outfit were inspired by her Filipino origins, including the flag of the Philippines and floral designs based on the sampaguita flower. Her fighting is a mix of kickboxing and eskrima. Tekken 7 director Michael Murray stated that they had difficulty incorporating eskrima techniques into her moveset due to it typically involving parries and attack neutralization with rapid counter attacks, leading to only a few techniques being based on it, including some throws and punches. Josie's eskrima is combined with kickboxing reminiscent of Yaw-Yan, an indigenous kickboxing martial art. She lacks the characteristic sticks used in eskrima, instead fighting completely unarmed. Josie's name is based on José Rizal, a national hero from the Philippines. However, she bears no resemblance to him, besides her name and ethnicity. Some of her moves were inspired by famous Filipino boxer Manny Pacquiao. Her moveset bears some resemblance to older Tekken character Bruce Irvin.

Josie was designed by character designer Mari Shimazaki, known for her work in the Bayonetta series. The character was created in response to the growing popularity of the series in the Philippines. Bandai Namco Entertainment community spokesman Mark Julio was involved in developing Josie's look and setting. She is voiced by Ananda Jacobs.

== Appearances ==
Josie was a big crybaby from a young age, unlike her parents who were fans of martial arts. They insisted she also train in martial arts, which she initially refuses, but eventually she reluctantly agrees to her parents' expectations. However, she is unable to get over her crybaby nature whilst she undergoes training in kickboxing.

After Josie grew more accustomed to her training, she became a professional kickboxer and a model to help get her household's finances on track, until a large typhoon struck their home. When the Mishima Zaibatsu sends the Tekken Force, to give relief aids to the typhoon victims in her ravaged country, Josie aspires to become the member of the Tekken Force. She eventually decides to join the Tekken Force by taking an employment examination during The King of Iron Fist Tournament 7. Unfortunately, her opponent in the final exam is actually a Tekken Force bear officer named Kuma. Nevertheless, despite having realized the other participants quit the exams due to Kuma, Josie have no choice to fight him, in order to complete her qualification to Tekken Force.

== Reception ==
Josie has received mixed reception, as noted by Kotaku writer Brian Ashcraft, who stated that while some liked her, others criticized her design did not adequately seem Filipino. Filipino poet Adonis Durado was one of these critics, believing that neither her physical attributes nor her outfit seemed Filipino. Durado also questioned the lack of eskrima sticks in her attacks. Ashcraft noted that Rizal does not seem to speak Filipino or speak in a Filipino accent. IGN writer Kenn Leandre stated that Filipino gamers were initially pleased by Josie's inclusion, citing the fact that she was an eskrima practitioner, has an outfit evocative of the flag of the Philippines, and has a name after José Rizal. Despite this, Leandre found the design disrespectful and lazy, arguing that her actions and appearance could not be described as Filipino. He felt that she "look[s] more like Sakura than Kristine Hermosa or Bea Alonzo," and like Durado, felt the lack of sticks made the e fighting style lacking. He was also critical of her name, suggesting that there were millions of names to choose from instead of using the name of a popular figure, and that Josie Rizal didn't feel right as a name. One eSports writer Joseph Asuncion felt differently about her design, praising her "sunkissed skin, brown eyes, and dark hair," as well as her outfit, stating that she "steals the show" in Tekken 7. He also felt that her gold trinkets evoke the rays of sun on the flag design. praising her design as "[stealing] the show."

Gonzalo Campoamor II, professor of Life and Works of Rizal at University of the Philippines Diliman, stated that, while happy to see Filipino representation in such a big fighting game, he found Josie to be a "tokenized" Filipino, believing that she lacked any connection to Filipino people or José Rizal. He felt that she did not appear Filipino outside of the flag representation in her dress, and that the only characterization that could be close to representation is her crying after winning, which he believed resembled Maria Clara, who will cry whether happy or sad according to Campoamor. He was critical of this portrayal, stating that Clara existed in an "ultra-macho Spanish-era Philippines," and that Filipinas had changed since then. He suggested a better choice for inclusion would be José Rizal himself or a character based on Elias from José Rizal's Noli Me Tangere, which Campoamor believed was the "quintessential representative of the Filipino masses." He expressed disappointment that Bandai Namco did not spend more time researching for this character.

Despite the mixed reception, shortly after Josie was introduced to the public on March 29, 2015, she became a trending topic on Twitter with many Filipino fans expressing generally positive reactions. Vice writer Kevin Wong felt that, despite the criticisms, she was a good start, and that while on the nose with her portrayal, it is ultimately a positive portrayal thanks in part to lacking Filipino representation in video games. IGN writer Jess Reyes believed that Josie is one of the most popular Filipino characters in video games. Until Then creator Mickole Klein Nulud also noted this, stating that Rizal is still only a small aspect of Tekken 7. Director Katsuhiro Harada also claimed that 90-percent of the feedback on Josie was positive upon reveal, declining to change it when asked on social media. IGN writer Kenn Leandre was critical of the response by Harada, questioning whether he views Filipino voices as the minority voice, or whether he cares about them. A person was initially quoted as being an official of the Philippines National Commission for Culture and the Arts (NCCA) who gave their opinion on Rizal, which led to reports that the NCCA had denounced the character. NCCA chairman Felipe De Leon Jr. denied this, stating that this person was not an employee of the agency's national committees, and that they are currently studying "what actions it may take on the issue of the name and image of Dr. Jose Rizal being dragged into this."
