= Blue Journey =

VTuber music group

- Blue Journey performing at Tokyo Garden Theater on September 13, 2023

Background information
- Works: See § Discography
- Years active: 2023–2024
- Labels: EMI Records; Holo-n
- Past members: See § Members

YouTube information
- Channel: Blue Journey
- Subscribers: 81,800
- Views: 8.2 million
- Last updated: March 31, 2024

Blue Journey was a music group of 23 VTubers affiliated with Hololive Production. The group was announced in March 2023 and ended in March 2024. Blue Journey released one album, Yoake no Uta, one non-album single, "Mizutamari", both of which charted, and performed a concert at Tokyo Garden Theater.

== Members ==
Blue Journey consisted of 23 female VTubers affiliated with Hololive Production:

- Amane Kanata
- Hakui Koyori
- Himemori Luna
- Houshou Marine
- Inugami Korone
- Minato Aqua
- Nekomata Okayu
- Omaru Polka
- Ookami Mio
- Oozora Subaru
- Aki Rosenthal
- Sakamata Chloe
- Sakura Miko
- Shirakami Fubuki
- Shiranui Flare
- Shirogane Noel
- Shishiro Botan
- Takane Lui
- Tokoyami Towa
- Tsunomaki Watame
- Usada Pekora
- Yukihana Lamy
- Yuzuki Choco

== History ==
Blue Journey was announced on March 19, 2023 – the second day of Hololive Super Expo 2023. The announcement was accompanied by a teaser video. On April 13, the teaser was followed up with a video posted to the group's YouTube channel announcing its first three singles. They were released digitally and with accompanying music videos over the following three months. "I Am Alone", sung by Minato, Houshou, and Tsunomaki, released on April 17; "You ≠ Me", sung by Sakura, Houshou, and Omaru, released on May 15; and "Dear Youthful Days", sung by Minato, Amane, and Yukihana, released on June 19. They were also released under EMI Records, a label owned by Universal Music Group which had previously signed the Hololive-affiliated VTuber Mori Calliope in 2022. On July 8, Hololive Production and EMI Records announced they had jointly established a record label, Holo-n. Blue Journey was the new label's inaugural undertaking and its later releases were under the label. Shirokuro of KAI-YOU concluded that the collaboration was an attempt by Hololive to solidify the artistic legitimacy and expand the audience of its VTubers, saying that a large number of people perceive them as unusual or foreign, a feeling he concluded could be lessened by collaborating with a Big Three label.

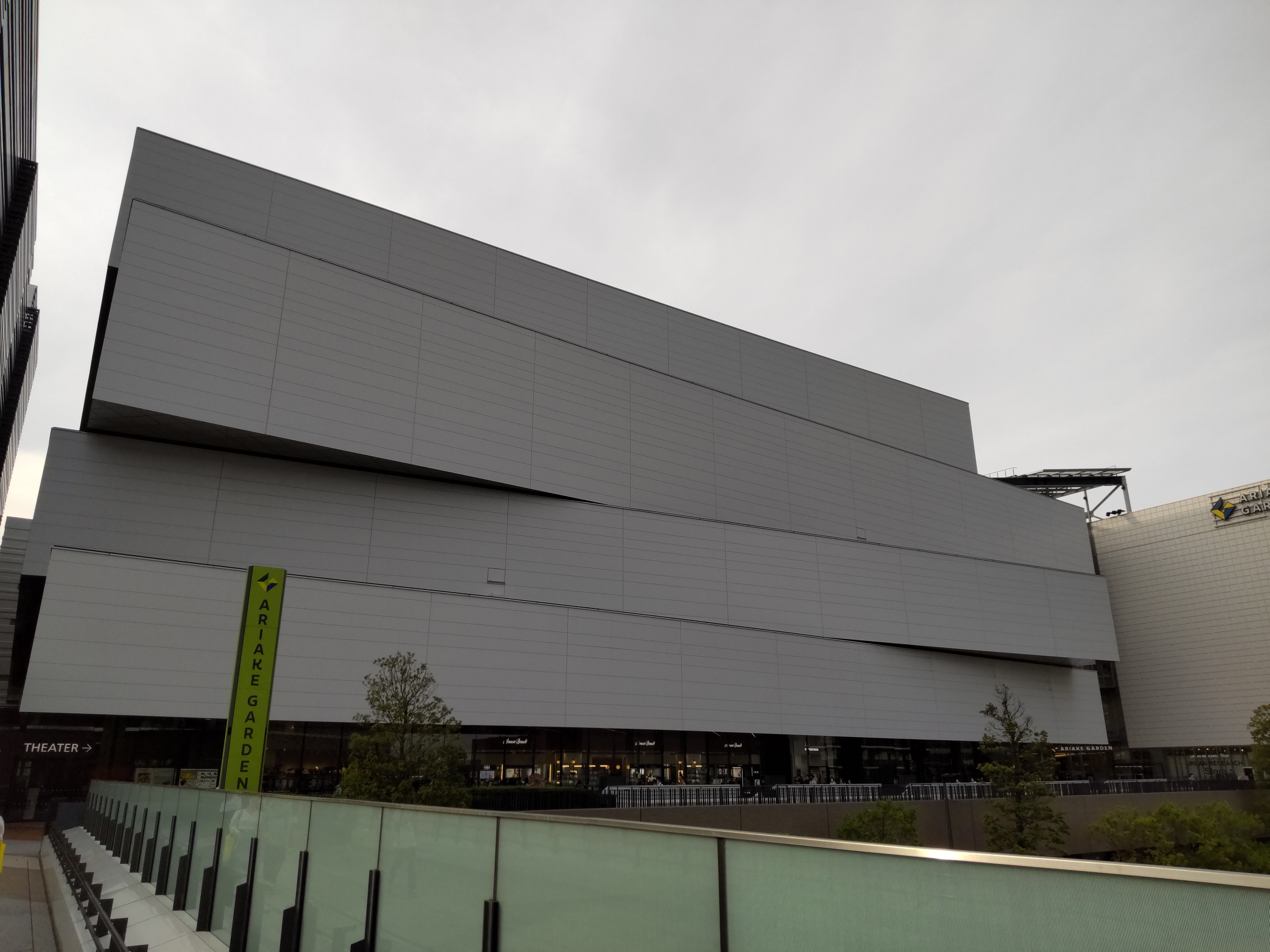
Tokyo Garden Theater was the venue of the Yoake no Uta concert.

Also on July 8, Blue Journey announced that their debut album, Yoake no Uta, would release on September 6 and that their debut concert of the same name would take place at Tokyo Garden Theater on September 13. At the time of the concert's announcement, Hololive had only previously hosted four large live concerts. On July 18, the group's fourth single "Astro", sung by Amane, Nekomata, and Shirogane, was released digitally with an accompanying music video. At the end of the concert, all 23 members of Blue Journey performed a previously unreleased single, "Mizutamari". On March 20, 2024, a video posted to the group's YouTube channel announced that it had ended after one year.

== Artistry and reception ==
Prior to Blue Journey's debut, Hololive's previous musical project, "Hololive Idol Project", was known for producing bright and poppy songs befitting an idol. Individual members of Hololive were also known for producing original songs that often function as character songs, displaying a member's personality. Blue Journey's songs differ, instead expressing melancholic and negative emotions. The group's stated aim was to bring happiness to people by expressing unwanted emotions. Shirokuro argued that this change may have been part of an attempt to appeal to a wider audience and make the VTubers more relatable, saying that negative emotions are commonly felt by everyone and so more relatable than the bright songs Hololive was known for. The concert featured spoken-word segments and the group's original songs. Takeshi Matsumoto of Real Sound felt that the stagecraft and spoken-word segments created a narrative distinct from the one on the album.

== Discography ==
=== Studio album ===
Title	Album details	Peak chart positions			Sales
Title	Album details	JPN	JPN Comb.	JPN Hot	Sales
Yoake no Uta	Released: September 6, 2023; Label: Holo-n; Formats: CD, digital download, streaming	11	8	8	JPN: 19,263

==== Track listing ====
Sourced from Apple Music:

Yoake no Uta track listing
No.	Title	Vocals	Length
1.	"Tears of the Moon" (ツキノナミダ)	Tsunomaki Watame, Shishiro Botan, Sakamata Chloe	3:46
2.	"Touch the Hurt Again" (また傷に触れる)	Shiranui Flare, Tokoyami Towa, Omaru Polka	3:18
3.	"Fujun Mujun" (不純矛盾)	Inugami Korone, Usada Pekora, Himemori Luna, Hakui Koyori	3:01
4.	"You ≠ Me" (君になりたかった)	Sakura Miko, Houshou Marine, Omaru Polka	3:03
5.	"Astro"	Nekomata Okayu, Shirogane Noel, Amane Kanata	4:11
6.	"Love Song Ha Iranai" (ラブソングはいらない)	Shirakami Fubuki, Usada Pekora, Yukihana Lamy	3:37
7.	"Dear Youthful Days" (あの日の僕らへ)	Minato Aqua, Amane Kanata, Yukihana Lamy	3:25
8.	"Natsuwo Yurusena" (夏を許せない)	Ookami Mio, Nekomata Okayu, Takane Lui	3:34
9.	"Utakata" (泡沫)	Aki Rosenthal, Shirakami Fubuki, Takane Lui	3:03
10.	"I Am Alone" (僕は独りだ)	Minato Aqua, Houshou Marine, Tsunomaki Watame	3:29
11.	"Trail of Shine" (光の軌跡)	Aki Rosenthal, Oozora Subaru, Ookami Mio	4:38
12.	"Southern Cross" (サザンクロス)	Sakura Miko, Oozora Subaru, Yuzuki Choco, Tokoyami Towa, Sakamata Chloe	3:53
Total length:			43:08

=== Singles ===
Title	Year	Peak chart positions			Album
Title	Year	JPN	JPN Comb.	JPN DL	Album
"I Am Alone" (僕は独りだ) (Minato Aqua, Houshou Marine, and Tsunomaki Watame)	2023	—	—	51	Yoake no Uta
"You ≠ Me" (君になりたかった) (Sakura Miko, Houshou Marine, Omaru Polka)	2023	—	—	—	Yoake no Uta
"Dear Youthful Days" (あの日の僕らへ) (Minato Aqua, Amane Kanata, Yukihana Lamy)	2023	—	—	62	Yoake no Uta
"Astro" (Amane Kanata, Nekomata Okayu, Shirogane Noel)	2023	—	—	—	Yoake no Uta
"Mizutamari" (水たまり) (all members)	2023	2	44	37	Non-album single
"—" denotes releases that did not chart.
