= Moona Hoshinova =

Indonesian virtual YouTuber

- ムーナ・ホシノヴァ
- Moona Hoshinova as designed by nyori
- Born: Indonesia
- Occupations: VTuber; singer

YouTube information
- Channel: Moona Hoshinova hololive
- Years active: 2020-present
- Subscribers: 1.42 million
- Views: 164 million
- Last updated: 6 November 2026

Moona Hoshinova (Japanese: ムーナ・ホシノヴァ) is an Indonesian VTuber and singer affiliated with Cover Corporation's Hololive Production agency. She debuted in April 2020 as part of Hololive Indonesia's 1st Generation, now known as hololive AREA15. She has released one album, Pandora (2025) and one EP, Orbiture (2024).

== Overview ==
Hoshinova's official lore describes her as a college student who is a model and idol. Her birthday is 15 February, and her character designer is nyori.

Hoshinova debuted as part of Hololive Indonesia's 1st Generation, alongside Ayunda Risu and Airani Iofifteen, being the second member of the unit to debut. In September 2026, due to a restructuring of Hololive Production where Hololive Indonesia and other branches were merged into one single Hololive branch, the unit became known as AREA15. Her fanbase is called Moonafic, short for "Moona Fanatic", which also coincides with the Indonesian term "munafik".

== Career ==
Moona Hoshinova's debut was announced on 6 April 2020, alongside Hololive Indonesia's 1st Generation. She held her debut stream on 11 April. In December 2022, Hoshinova held her first 3D stream.

In addition to Indonesian, Hoshinova also uses English frequently during her streams depends on her viewers that she talked to. She also speaks Japanese, but not fluent enough to use in streams. She frequently plays games as part of her streams, most notably Minecraft. Hoshinova has held Minecraft collabs with different Hololive members, most notably Usada Pekora who is part of a well-known duo with Hoshinova as "PekoMoona". She is also described as bad with horror, and uses an alternate personality on rare occasions as "Hoshinova". In February 2022, Hoshinova's channel reached 1 million subscribers, becoming the first Vtuber in Indonesia and Southeast Asia to achieve this milestone.

Hoshinova has made several appearances at the Anime Festival Asia, including the AFA Online in December 2020 and AFA Singapore in November 2022 as part of "Hololive Meet" alongside Mori Calliope, Gawr Gura, Tsunomaki Watame and Anya Melfissa. In September 2022, Hoshinova was featured in the game Among Us as part of a collab with Hololive. In April 2023, Hoshinova was also added to World of Warships as part of a collab alongside Takanashi Kiara, Amelia Watson and Shishiro Botan.

Hoshinova is also known for singing, especially in pop rock and ballad genres. She has stated her dream is to produce more music and making her own concert. In March 2021, Hoshinova released her first original song "Ai no Chiisana Uta". In February 2022, as part of her birthday celebration, Hoshinova released her second original song "High Tide", her most well-known song to date. In January 2024, she released her first EP Orbiture. In April 2025, Hoshinova released her first album Pandora, making her the first member of Hololive Indonesia to release an album. In addition, Hoshinova also releases music as part of AREA15, Hololive Indonesia and Hololive Idol Project. In November 2025, Hoshinova alongside other Hololive Indonesia members participated in the hololive Indonesia 5th Anniversary LIVE Chromatic Future live concert at Comifuro 21, which was held at the Indonesia Convention Exhibition.

== Discography ==
=== Albums ===
Title	Album details	Peak chart positions		
Title	Album details	JPN	JPN Comb.	JPN Sales
Pandora (stylized in all-caps)	Released: 12 April 2025; Label: Cover Corp	23	42	15

=== Extended plays ===
Title	Album details	Peak chart positions
Title	Album details	JPN Dg.
Orbiture (stylized in all-caps)	Released: 6 January 2024; Label: Cover Corp	43

=== Singles ===
==== As lead artist ====
Title	Year	Peak chart positions	Album
Title	Year	JPN DL	Album
"Ai no Chiisana Uta" (愛の小さな歌)	2021	—	Pandora
"High Tide"	2022	97	Pandora
"Perisai Jitu"	2022	—	Pandora
"Who's Toxic ? It's You!"	2023	—	Pandora
"Deja Vu" (stylized in all-caps)	2024	—	Non-album singles
"Multiverse"	2024	—	Non-album singles
"Nightmare"	2024	—	Pandora
"100%" (featuring Nerissa Ravencroft)	2025	—	Pandora
"Night Train to Nowhere"	2026	—	Non-album single

==== As collaborative artist ====
Title	Year	Peak chart positions
Title	Year	JPN DL
"id:entity voices" (as Hololive Indonesia)	2021	93
"HI-15" (as Hololive Indonesia 1st Generation)	2022	—
"story time" (with Hoshimachi Suisei, IRyS and AZKi as Star Flower)	2022	23
"All Aboard! viv:ID CRUISE ~Bokura ga Kuru Kara~" (with Ayunda Risu, Pavolia Reine and Kobo Kanaeru as viv:ID CREW)	2023	—
"Dramatic XViltration" (as Hololive Indonesia 1st Generation)	2024	—
"HI:STREET TIME" (as Hololive Indonesia)	2024	—
"Senandung Jiwa" (as Hololive Indonesia)	2024	—
"Juara Khatulistiwa" (as Hololive Indonesia)	2025	—
"Show Them (Who You Are)" (as Hololive Indonesia)	2025	—
