= Mococo =

Mococo may refer to:

- Mococo Abyssgard, a VTuber and singer
- Mococo, a neighborhood of Martinez, California
- Mococo, a taxonomical synonym of the scientific name of the ring-tailed lemur
