= Blue Journey (disambiguation) =

Blue Journey was a music group formed by members of Hololive Production.

Blue Journey or The Blue Journey may also refer to:

- The Blue Journey, 1982 piano composition by Kamran Ince
- Blue Journey, 2003 debut tour of Run&Gun
- "The Blue Journey", documentary featured on some editions of Best of Blue
- The Blue Journey, OyamO play directed by Neema Barnette
- The Blue Journey, 2025 concerts headlined by Yook Sung-jae
- Blue Journey, finalist of America's Got Talent season 9
- Blue Journey March, part of the military parade of the 70th anniversary of the People's Republic of China

== See also ==
- Blue's Journey, 1990 video game
