= Amane Kanata =

Japanese singer, songwriter and virtual YouTuber

- 天音かなた
- Amane Kanata as designed by Oshioshio
- Born: 22 April
- Other names: PP Tenshi, Kanatan, Kanataso
- Occupation: Virtual YouTuber

YouTube information
- Channel: Kanata Ch. 天音かなた
- Years active: 2019–2025
- Subscribers: 1.72 million
- Views: 576 million
- Last updated: 27 December 2025
- Website: hololive.hololivepro.com/en/talents/amane-kanata/

Amane Kanata (Japanese: 天音かなた) is a retired Japanese singer, songwriter and virtual YouTuber affiliated with Hololive Production. She debuted as part of Hololive Japan's fourth generation "holoForce" on 27 December 2019, and became known for her singing and songwriting abilities, as well as her strength. Over the course of her career, she released two albums and performed a solo concert, among various other appearances on Hololive group songs and at company festivals. At the time of her graduation, she had over 1.72 million YouTube subscribers.

Amane suffered multiple health complications stemming from Ménière's disease, which left her deaf in one ear, since before she joined Hololive. On 2 December 2025, she announced that she would be graduating from the company and fully leaving the entertainment industry due to work-related stress. Her final activities were held on 27 December, the sixth anniversary of her debut.

== Overview ==
Amane Kanata is one of the five original members of "holoForce", Hololive's fourth generation of Japanese streamers, alongside Tokoyami Towa, Tsunomaki Watame, Himemori Luna, and Kiryu Coco, the latter of whom graduated in 2021. Her official bio describes her as being cheerful around her close friends, but shy and quiet in large crowds, with the goal of performing at the Saitama Super Arena. Her model was designed by Oshioshio and was rigged by Nokoyama at the time of her graduation.

In 2017, Amane was diagnosed with Ménière's disease, which left her completely deaf in one ear and prevented her from joining traditional idol groups. Having already been interested in VTubers, she would apply for Hololive's fourth generation and was accepted despite having a lack of confidence in her ability. She cited Eri Kamei as an inspiration for her work as an idol, as well as Minato Aqua as an influence on her VTubing career. She also cited Yui Aragaki as her "first love", and her reaction to Yui's marriage to Gen Hoshino would serve as inspiration for her song "Betsu Sekai".

Amane was well known for her strong vocal performance, having held notes in online concerts for more than 20 seconds on multiple occasions. She was also known her work as a composer on her solo songs "Betsu Sekai" and "Jumanokudo", as well as the holoForce group song "Kiseki Knot"; she also wrote the lyrics for her songs "Start Up", "Sekai de Ichiban no Idol", and "Fallen Wing", the latter of which was co-written by Toby Fox and Camellia. Outside of her music, she was further known for her grip strength of over 50 kg, which exceeds that of the average adult male, and led her to inadvertently destroy multiple objects on stream.

== Career ==
=== 2019–2023: Debut and initial singles ===
Amane Kanata's debut, along with those of the other members of holoForce, were announced by Hololive on 25 December 2019. She would make her official debut on 27 December, the first in holoForce to do so. Due to the prominent usage of Microsoft PowerPoint during her stream, her fanbase would coin the nickname PP Tenshi (PP天使) for her. She would later further have her 3D debut on 5 July 2020, which would see over 100,000 concurrent viewers. The holoForce song "Kiseki Knot", written and composed by Amane, was released on 25 June 2021, a week prior to genmate Kiryu Coco's graduation from Hololive.

On June 24, it was confirmed that Amane and holoForce genmate Tokoyami Towa would be performing "Madoromi", the theme song for the video game Deep Insanity: Asylum; the song would be released on October 13. On 27 July 2021, she reached one million subscribers on her YouTube channel, becoming the third member of holoForce to do so after Kiryu and Tsunomaki Watame. On 19 August 2021, she would release her official solo debut single "Tokusya-Seizon Wonder-la-der!!", written and composed by Unison Square Garden bassist Tomoya Tabuchi. On 27 December 2021, for her second anniversary, Amane performed a live online 3D concert, during which she would perform and immediately release her single "Tenshi no Agape". Subsequent online concerts in 2022 for her birthday and for her third anniversary would be accompanied by the singles "Chūku no Niwa" and "Betsu Sekai".

On 14 February 2022, Amane tested positive for COVID-19, causing her to take a nine-day break from streaming. On 2 May 2022, it was announced that Amane and Tokoyami would be forming the musical unit Orio, releasing their debut single "Over Time" on the same date; an EP of the same name was released on 30 July. In April 2023, Amane was confirmed as a member of Hololive and EMI Records Japan's musical project Blue Journey, performing in the project's songs "Dear Youthful Days", "Astro", and "Mizutamari". On 1 August, she served as a live announcer alongside Hakui Koyori during a Yomiuri Giants game, as part of a collaboration between the team and Hololive.

=== 2024–2025: Unknown Diva, Trigger, and Lock On ===
On 6 January 2024, during a live online concert, Amane announced her debut album Unknown Diva and premiered multiple songs from the album, including "Knock It Out!" which was released simultaneously as the lead single. Upon the album's announcement, various producers were confirmed as having worked on the album, including TeddyLoid and Giga, who wrote and produced "Knock It Out!", as well as Jin, Teniwoha, Junpei Fujita, and Mikito-P. After the release of further singles "Junsuishin" and "Start Up" on 4 and 24 February respectively, Unknown Diva was officially released on 13 March 2024. The album would see solid commercial success, debuting at number six on the Oricon Albums Chart and number seven on the Billboard Japan Hot Albums chart.

On 5 May 2024, Amane premiered the first episode of her podcast Amane Kanata Wants to Learn Music!, with Kayoko Kusano serving as her inaugural guest. On 13 September, she was announced as a performer at a Animelo Summer Live VTuber concert, alongside fellow Hololive member Ookami Mio. On 23 December, after fellow Hololive member Sakamata Chloe announced that she would be stepping down from regular activities, Amane performed an online 3D concert with Sakamata and AZKi and released the collaborative song "Tenkai Dokyū Oshigoto Road".

During an online live 3D concert on 22 April 2025 for her birthday, Amane announced her second and final studio album Trigger, and simultaneously performed and released the album's lead single "Cupid", written and produced by TeddyLoid; she also confirmed her first and only solo live performance Lock On at the Ariake Arena to support the album. On 1 June 2025, she released the album's second single "Self Service", written and produced by Satsuki. On 21 June, she confirmed that AZKi would be a special guest at Lock On. On 26 June 2025, Amane was confirmed to be performing the tie-in song "Lumière" for the gacha game Memento Mori, subsequently being confirmed for a 29 July release. On 29 June, she ended a gaming stream early due to undergoing urgent hospitalization, which was later revealed at a press conference-style stream to have resulted in the discovery of kidney stones. Trigger was officially released on 23 July 2025 to moderate commercial success compared to Unknown Diva; while outpeaking Unknown Diva on the Oricon charts by debuting at number five, it significantly underperformed on the Billboard charts, where it debuted at number 33. Amane would perform her Lock On concert at the Ariake Arena on 13 August 2025 to widespread acclaim, with praise for her vocal performance, her costume changes, the set list, AZKi's appearance, the production, and the performance of her live band; she would premiere the music video for her song "Sekai de Ichiban no Idol" immediately afterwards.

=== Graduation ===
On 2 December 2025, Amane announced her graduation from Hololive effective 27 December, the sixth anniversary of her debut. As reasons, she cited that she had to handle tasks beyond the scope of her role repeatedly, and as a result she could not keep up with her own activities and accumulated strain that made it difficult for her to continue in a healthy state. Resolving these issues within Hololive, she said, would require a fundamental review of the organization's internal structure. She additionally stated that she has no intention to resume her activities or "reincarnate" (perform as another character) after her graduation, and would instead look for work outside of the entertainment industry.

== Discography ==
=== Studio albums ===
Title	Album details	Peak chart positions		
Title	Album details	JPN	JPN Comb.	JPN Hot
Unknown Diva	Released: 13 March 2024; Label: Cover; Format: CD, digital download, streaming	6	6	7
Trigger	Released: 23 July 2025; Label: Cover; Format: CD, digital download, streaming	5	5	33

=== Extended plays ===
==== As collaborative artist in ensemble ====
Title	EP details
Over Time (with Tokoyami Towa as Orio)	Released: 30 July 2022; Label: Cover; Format: Digital download, streaming

=== Singles ===
==== As lead artist ====
Title	Year	Peak chart positions		Album
Title	Year	JPN Dig.	JPN DL	Album
"Tokusya-Seizon Wonder-la-der!!" (特者生存ワンダラダー!!, Toku-sha Seizon Wandaradā!!)	2021	28	27	Unknown Diva (Note: This song was originally released as a stand-alone single, but was included on Unknown Diva as a re-recording.)
"Madoromi" (マドロミ) (with Tokoyami Towa)	2021	—	55	Non-album single
"Tenshi no Agape" (天使のagape)	2021	44	36	Unknown Diva
"Chūku no Niwa" (中空の庭)	2022	41	49	Unknown Diva
"Betsu Sekai" (別世界; "Another World")	2022	—	71	Unknown Diva
"Knock It Out!"	2024	—	50	Unknown Diva
"Junsuishin" (純粋心)	2024	—	84	Unknown Diva
"Start Up"	2024	—	—	Unknown Diva
"Cupid"	2025	—	—	Trigger
"Self Service" (セルフサービス, Serufu Sēbisu)	2025	—	—	Trigger
"Lumière"	2025	—	—	Non-album single
"Dream a Dream No One Has Seen" (誰も見てない夢を見ろ, Dare mo mitenai yume o miro)	2025	44	50	Non-album single

==== As collaborative artist in ensemble ====
Title	Year	Peak chart positions			Album
Title	Year	JPN Dig.	JPN Hot	JPN DL	Album
"Kiseki Knot" (キセキ結び, Kiseki Musubi) (with Tokoyami Towa, Tsunomaki Watame, Himemori Luna, and Kiryu Coco as Hololive 4th generation)	2021	8	53	4	Non-album single
"Over Time" (with Tokoyami Towa as Orio)	2022	—	—	—	Over Time
"Hajimari no Mahou (Charm)" (はじまりの魔法-charm-) (with Sakura Miko, Himemori Luna, Houshou Marine, Murasaki Shion, and Sakamata Chloe as Magical Girl HoloWitches!)	2024	—	—	90	Non-album singles
"On Your Side" (with Sakura Miko, Himemori Luna, Houshou Marine, Murasaki Shion, and Sakamata Chloe as Magical Girl HoloWitches!)	2024	—	—	—	Non-album singles
"Kizuna to Kiseki" (キズナトキセキ) (Minato Aqua with hololive JP)	2024	10	—	12	Non-album singles
"Tenkaidokyuu Oshigoto Road" (天界弩級オシゴトロード, Tenkai Dokyū Oshigoto Rōdo) (with AZKi and Sakamata Chloe as Kanaken)	2024	42	—	46	Non-album singles

=== Guest appearances ===
Title	Year	Artist(s)	Album
"Precious Photographs" (大切フォトグラフ, Taisetsu Fotogurafu)	2022	Shirakami Fubuki, Minato Aqua, Houshou Marine, and Momosuzu Nene (as Hololive Idol Project)	Bouquet
"Shiny Smily Story (2022 Version)"	2022	Hololive Idol Project	Hololive Summer 2022
"Leech" (ヒル, Hiru)	2023	Deco*27 (as Holo*27)	Holo*27 Originals, Vol. 1
"Tokyo Summer Session" (東京サマーセッション, Tōkyō Samā Sesshon)	2024	Oozora Subaru (as Hololive × HoneyWorks)	HoloHoneyGaoka High School Covers
