= Momosuzu Nene =

Japanese virtual YouTuber

- 桃鈴ねね
- Momosuzu Nene as designed by Nishizawa 5mm
- Other name: Nenechi
- Occupations: VTuber; singer

YouTube information
- Channel: Nene Ch.桃鈴ねね
- Years active: 2020-present
- Subscribers: 1.33 million
- Views: 256 million
- Last updated: 9 November 2026

Momosuzu Nene (Japanese: 桃鈴ねね) is a Japanese VTuber and singer affiliated with Cover Corporation's Hololive Production agency. She debuted on August 2020 as part of Hololive 5th Generation (commonly referred to as NePoLaBo). She has released one album, Peachful Story (2026) and one EP, Nenene no Ne! (2023).

== Overview ==
Momosuzu's official lore describes her as a girl who came from another world in order to become an idol. Her birthday is 2 March. Her character designer is Nishizawa 5mm.

Momosuzu is a member of Hololive 5th Generation (or NePoLaBo), alongside Yukihana Lamy, Shishiro Botan and Omaru Polka. She is commonly referred to by fans as Nenechi (ねねち). Her fanbase is officially called Nekko (ねっ子), and she also calls her fans "husbands" or "wives".

Niji Kusano remarked that she "possesses a level of mental fortitude that could easily rival even her more senior peers".

== Career ==
Momosuzu's debut was announced on 6 August 2020, alongside the rest of NePoLaBo; she became NePoLaBo's second member to debut on 13 August. In January 2022, she ranked in 8th place for YouTubers with the most Super Chats. By November 2022, Momosuzu had reached one million subscribers on her channel.

In May 2022, Taiwanese fans of Momosuzu ran a crowdfunding campaign to place fan support advertisements of her at several metro train stations throughout the country.

=== Streaming career ===
Momosuzu's streams usually include playing games, singing and chatting. She plays a wide variety of games, including games such as Bunny Garden and Minecraft.

Momosuzu frequently holds chat streams, including several where she eats lunch while chatting at 12pm, as well as singing streams. In September 2023, she built a custom-made keyboard on a livestream, with her real-life hands shown taking apart (and painting) the keyboard's parts. In April 2026, she held a stream where she and her viewers worked together to measure several Hololive members by their fandoms' romantic leanings.

In July 2024, Momosuzu went into a temporary hiatus. Following a one-off Minecraft stream in October 2024, she fully returned to streaming on 12 November 2024.

=== Musical career ===
In March 2021, Momosuzu released her first original song, "Nenenenenenenene!Daibakusou". In April 2021, she released "Lunch with Me", a techno-pop song by Hige Driver inspired by her weekday chat streams. In June 2021, she, along with Minato Aqua and Oozora Subaru, performed the ending theme "Tsumari wa Itsumo Kujikenai!" to the anime The Great Jahy Will Not Be Defeated! as NEGI☆U. In June 2023, her first EP Nenene no Ne was released with all songs written, composed and arranged by Hige Driver. Tamagomago described her 2025 song "Karakara!" as a "youth anthem".

In July 2026, Momosuzu released her first album Peachful Story, which charted at #11 on the Oricon Albums Chart. Historically, she had been struggling to get idol stage appearances unlike other Hololive compatriots, but eventually overcame this issue, and on 29 July 2026 held her first solo concert Rise Up: Nenenenenenenene Full Flourish at the Tokyo Garden Theatre. Momosuzu has previously stated that she would want to perform a world tour someday.

In addition to her original songs, Momosuzu also releases songs as part of NePoLaBo and Hololive Idol Project. Her musical work also includes dance lessons.

=== Others ===
In October 2021, Momosuzu appeared on Weekly Playboy's Next Generation of Beautiful Women. In November 2021, she voiced Kerry, a character in episode six of The World's Finest Assassin Gets Reincarnated in Another World as an Aristocrat. In June 2022, she briefly appeared as a partner in rhythm arcade game Tetote Connect.

== Personal life ==
Momosuzu stated in an interview that her idol is Kirari Tsukushima from Kirarin Revolution, which made her want to become an idol and led to her applying to Hololive many times before making her debut. She is a fan of songs of Disney and Sayaka Kanda. She also owns several rhinoceros beetles.

== Discography ==
=== Albums ===
Title	Album details	Peak chart positions		
Title	Album details	JPN	JPN Sales	JPN DL
Peachful Story	Released: 8 July 2026; Label: Cover Corp	11	11	20

=== Extended plays ===
==== As lead artist ====
Title	Album details	Peak chart positions
Title	Album details	JPN Sales
Nenene no Ne (stylized in low-caps)	Released: 11 June 2023; Label: Cover Corp	33

==== As collaborative artist ====
Title	Album details
NEGI☆U NO PANAIUTA (with Minato Aqua and Oozora Subaru as NEGI☆U)	Released: 1 June 2022; Label: Cover Corp

=== Singles ===
==== As lead artist ====
Title	Year	Peak chart positions		Album
Title	Year	JPN Dig.	JPN DL	Album
"Nenenenenenenene!Daibakusou" (ねねねねねねねね！大爆走) (stylized in all-caps)	2021	25	12	Nenene no Ne
"Lunch With Me" (stylized as Lunch with me)	2021	34	24	Nenene no Ne
"Momonone" (モモノネ) (stylized in low-caps)	2021	—	—	Nenene no Ne
"Ring-A-Linger"	2022	—	86	Nenene no Ne
"Congra CHU☆March" (コングラッCHU☆マーチ) (stylized as congrachu☆march)	2023	—	—	Peachful Story
"Michishirube" (みちしるべ)	2023	—	—	Nenene no Ne
"Nenechi's Giragira Fan Meeting" (ねねちのギラギラファンミーティング)	2023	—	—	Peachful Story
"I'm Difficult, but Love Me" (LOVE受信、ヒクツ発信) (stylized as I'm difficult, but love me)	2025	—	—	Peachful Story
"Karakara!" (カラカラ！)	2025	—	—	Peachful Story
"Liminal"	2026	—	—	Peachful Story
"The Pink Hourglass" (ももいろの砂時計)	2026	—	—	Non-album single

==== As hololive 5th Generation (NePoLaBo) ====
Title	Year	Peak chart positions
Title	Year	JPN Dig.
"Twinkle 4 You"	2023	29
"Cosmic Wonderful Tour!"	2023	—
"Hyper Jumpin'"	2023	—
"Hitotsuninarukoe" (ひとつになる声)	2025	81
"Cosmic Wonderful Tour! -Christmas Remix-"	2025	—
"#Melozoma" (＃めろぞーま)	2026	—
"Watcha Gatcha!!!!!!!!" (with Secret Society holoX)	2026	—

==== As collaborative artist ====
Title	Year	Peak chart positions		
Title	Year	JPN	JPN Dig.	JPN DL
"Tsumari wa Itsumo Kujikenai!" (つまりはいつもくじけない！) (with NEGI☆U)	2021	—	—	—
"Sushi Desho!" (寿司☆でしょ！) (with NEGI☆U)	2022	—	—	—
"Get the Crown" (stylized in all-caps, with Hoshimachi Suisei, Tokino Sora, Natsuiro Matsuri, Aki Rosenthal, Oozora Subaru, Tokoyami Towa, Hakui Koyori and Kazama Iroha as Hoshimatic Project)	2024	—	30	36
"Live It Loud!" (stylized in all-caps, with Kureiji Ollie, Mori Calliope, IRyS and Nerissa Ravencroft)	2025	—	—	—
"Beep Beep" (stylized in all-caps, as Hoshimatic Project)	2026	18	—	—
"#NobodyDoesItLikeUs" (#ウチらしか勝たん) (with Tokoyami Towa)	2026	—	—	—
