= Hololive Dreams =

hololive Dreams
- Developers: Cover Corporation; QualiArts
- Publisher: QualiArts
- Platforms: iOS; Android; Windows
- Release: July 23, 2026
- Genres: Rhythm game; role-playing game
- Modes: Single-player; multiplayer

Hololive Dreams (Japanese: ホロライブ ドリームス), commonly known by the shorthand HoloDori (ホロドリ), is a 2026 rhythm and role-playing game featuring VTubers affiliated with Hololive Production. It is free-to-play with gacha mechanics.

== Gameplay ==
=== Characters and story ===
Hololive Dreams features 54 playable characters at launch. Its characters (referred to in-game as holomems) are members of the Japanese, Indonesian, English, and DEV_IS branches of the VTuber agency Hololive Production. Some VTubers no longer employed by Hololive (colloquially referred to as "graduated") are included in the game and appear in the story, but are not playable. The characters appear as chibis in the game's 3D world and also have 2D models used in the story.

In the story, Hololive-affiliated VTubers come to an oceanic island to open a theme park. The game has main and side quests that expand the theme park and its facilities. Playing the rhythm game and minigames provide materials that are used to expand the facilities. As the main quest progresses, more VTubers come to the island to construct new facilities that fit their motifs. Upon the game's release, its world had two areas, Harmony Garden and the Mega Sphere, with the developers stating that they plan to release more. The game can be played in multiplayer and single-player.

=== Gacha mechanics and scoring ===
Hololive Dreams is free-to-play and monetized through gacha mechanics, with each character having three rarities (three-star, four-star, and five-star). Upon starting the game for the first time, the player can select one character and receive their five-star rarity. The player starts with the five-star, a random four-star, and three random three-stars. They can re-roll the starting five characters, but this will also randomize the five-star they selected. In the rhythm game, scoring is determined by the player's skill but also by various traits of the characters and how the player organizes them. The player forms a unit with five characters, with one being the unit's leader. They receive different scores depending on the costume of the leader, the synergies of the different traits of the characters, how much each character has been leveled up, if each character has undergone special training, been awakened, and by a feature known as the "Holomem Board". Every day, the player receives two side quests which allow them to unlock a random playable character in the 3D world and one of their songs in the rhythm game. There is also an item that allows the player to start the side quest for a character of their choice. The game also has memberships which provide skins for the rhythm game. The gacha system influences the amount of resources and rewards the player receives from the game.

=== Rhythm game ===
In the rhythm game mode of Hololive Dreams, the player taps notes that slide across the screen. There are different types of notes: blue notes that are tapped when they reach a certain point on the screen, green notes that the player holds down when they reach a certain point on the screen, pink notes that the player flicks when they reach a certain point on the screen, and yellow notes that act as blue notes but are easier to tap and make louder noises. These mechanics are common in the genre. The game mode has different difficulty settings and an autoplay setting that bypasses it. The game mode launched with over 150 songs, featuring both original and cover songs by Hololive talents. At launch, it included one original song from each talent, another song from each talent that was either an original or a cover, and more songs that were by ensembles. Music videos and footage of concerts are included in the rhythm game and appear while playing original songs and some cover songs, although this feature can be disabled.

The player can create their own charts, with custom sequences of notes, and publish them, allowing other players to play them. The custom sequences can include difficult design features not include in the standard rhythm game. The gameplay is similar to Hatsune Miku: Colorful Stage! and some Love Live! games.

=== Other mechanics ===
The 3D world has various elements, such as daily quests, a mode to take photos of the world, and treasure hunts. The characters appear and interact in the world. It also has minigames, such as jump rope, obstacle courses, Pokajan! (a card game that combines elements of poker and mahjong), and cops and robbers.

== Development ==
Hololive Dreams was announced in March 2025 during a Hololive concert, under the codename DREAMS. Cover Corporation, Hololive Production's corporate parent, had the game developed and published by QualiArts, a subsidiary of Japanese media conglomerate CyberAgent.

The producers from both QualiArts and Cover wanted to make a game that is grander in scale than what is generally known in rhythm games. In an interview with IGN, the developers said that the large number of songs were included to stand out in Japan's crowded rhythm game market, also saying it resulted as a natural by-product of aiming to give equal representation to the 54 VTubers. The developers said that the inclusion of minigames and rhythm game elements role in unlocking features were a conscious effort to keep the attention of non-rhythm game enthusiasts. The developers stated that they included cover songs as they are a common appeal in rhythm games and that the covers included were selected to cater to Japanese audiences.

In an interview with PC Gamer, Hololive-affiliated VTuber Shiori Novella stated that the characters are accurate to the real people, saying that the VTubers had lots of involvement in scripting and dialoguing the characters. The developers separately stated that they were attempting to accommodate requests from the VTubers regarding the appearance of characters.

== Release ==
A teaser trailer following Tokino Sora, Hololive's first VTuber, was released in January 2026, and a full trailer was released at Hololive's annual convention in March 2026. The game was released on Windows through Steam, iOS, and Android. It has cross-play and data can be transferred between platforms. According to the game's publishers, it had 1.5 million registrations before it was released. It was released on July 23, 2026. It is the first mobile game by Hololive. The company had previously licensed independent games, such as the fan game HoloCure – Save the Fans!, and the game was released amid a business expansion targeted at the United States. After release, the game has included regularly scheduled special events. In an interview with IGN, developers stated that the events were primarily targeted at mobile gamers.

== Reception ==
Tyler Colp of PC Gamer described the theme park elements as akin to the series Tomodachi Life. Colp also described the character interactions, such as characters walking on powerlines or being knocked unconscious by falling apples, as entertaining and sometimes leading him to forget that it includes a rhythm game. Colp evaluated it as a "neat way" to learn about VTubers and Hololive, and more comprehensive than other games featuring Hololive-affiliated VTubers. A reviewer from Dengeki also evaluated it as better and more polished than fan games. The reviewer stated their excitement at seeing their favorite VTubers interact in the open-world. A reviewer for Famitsu, playing at a preview event, found the minigame and open-world aspect surprisingly good and evaluated the game as having intricate details. The reviewer found each aspect of the game enjoyable and said it was well-balanced. The Dengeki reviewer found the game's best aspect to be players ability to create their own charts.

Jenni Lada of Siliconera criticized the game's PC version, taking particular issue with its keyboard controls, which she found uncomfortable, and lack of touchscreen or controller support on PC devices. Regarding its PC port, she also had more minor criticism for its use of kernel-level anti-cheat and disabling of online leaderboards for PC versions, the latter of which prevents players from receiving some cosmetics and other awards. She also criticized the game's gacha system and found that while its pricing and rates are at the industry standard or more generous than it, that its spark system is particularly ungenerous.
