= Murasaki Shion =

Hololive VTuber and singer

- Murasaki Shion as designed by Tam-U
- Occupation: VTuber

YouTube information
- Channel: Shion Ch. 紫咲シオン
- Years active: 2018–2025
- Subscribers: 1.31 million
- Views: 254 million
- Last updated: 22 May 2026
- Website: hololive.hololivepro.com/en/talents/murasaki-shion/

Murasaki Shion (Japanese: 紫咲 シオン, Hepburn: Murasaki Shion) is a retired Japanese VTuber and singer. She was affiliated with Cover Corporation's Hololive Production agency from 2018 until 2025, a member of Hololive's 2nd Generation. Her work involved Let's Plays, ASMR, casual chatting, and music, and she released several singles (many of which charted on Oricon and Billboard Japan's digital song charts).

== Overview ==
Murasaki Shion's fictional lore describes her as "a child that randomly appears around the Underworld Academy... though she's actually an adult (or so she says)", as well as "a self-proclaimed talented dark magician of noble birth (or so she says)". Niji Kusano of Kai-You called her the embodiment of the "quintessential 'little witch' persona".

Murasaki was one of the five members of the agency's subgroup Hololive Generation 2, alongside Minato Aqua, Nakiri Ayame, Yuzuki Choco, and Oozora Subaru. Her character designer is Tam-U. Her fandom is named the "Shiokko" (塩っ子).

== Career ==
Murasaki Shion's debut stream was on 17 August 2018. According to Cover CEO Motoaki Tanigo, the reason he hired her was because he found her slightly mischievous side a charming quality. She debuted her 3D model on 12 May 2019, amidst a trend of Hololive VTubers getting 3D models.

Murasaki also performed Let's Plays, one of her focuses as a streamer. Notable games she played as a Let's Player include GeoGuessr, Rust, and Uno. In December 2019, she hosted a Hololive Pokémon Sword and Shield tournament. She often formed the collaborator trio Manji-gumi with Minato Aqua and Nakiri Ayame. In addition to games, she also posted livestreams specializing in ASMR; Tamagomago of MoguraVR said that they were "absolutely packed with comedic bits", with one with Oozora Subaru having "chaotic, slapstick content that completely shatters the very definition of ASMR." Additionally, another focus on her streams was casual chatting.

In April 2022, Murasaki's YouTube channel surpassed 1 million subscribers, celebrating with a singing stream. By March 2025, she had 1.29 million YouTube subscribers. Streaming market analysis company Streams Chart ranked her as the #1 Most Popular VTuber in 2025 with 355,000 peak viewers.

=== Musical career ===
Murasaki's 2021 debut single, "Mage of Violet", is an electronic song composed and written by Vocaloid musician Kairiki Bear; Niji Kusano remarked that the lyrics "seem to perfectly capture the very innocence and playfulness she displays during her live streams"; while An Kohiki of Dengeki Online remarked that the song "has become virtually synonymous with her identity". Her final song "Shion" was written, composed, and arranged by Jin; Kohiki called it "a powerful message song that conveys her heartfelt emotions with absolute clarity". Other songs she performed include the ska punk "Riazyuu: Bokumetu Movement" (2024), produced by HoneyWorks, and "Forgive Me Medicine" (2024), produced by PinocchioP.

Murasaki also collaborated with Inugami Korone on cover songs, with her final being Ayumi Miyazaki's "Brave Heart", and she and Sakamata Chloe performed as the duo "Shio-Shachi". In addition to her singles, she also held karaoke cover song livestreams.

=== Hiatuses and graduation ===
In May 2021, Murasaki's took a break from streaming for a few weeks; she explained in a stream that she had been bedridden with a sore throat, and that the graduation of Kiryu Coco had worsened her physical and mental health. On 21 December 2023, it was announced that Murasaki would being undergoing a hiatus from most of her activities following a consultation with her. In April 2024, she uploaded her first video since the hiatus, a cover of "Bling-Bang-Bang-Born". In August 2024, she held her first live-stream since the hiatus, a decision she explained was prompted by Minato Aqua's plans to graduate from Hololive.

On 6 March 2025, Murasaki announced in a livestream titled "Important Notice" (大切なお知らせ) that she would graduate from Hololive on 26 April; she cited creative differences with the agency. She held her graduation stream that day. CEO Tanigo and several Hololive VTubers (Note: Specifically, Shirakami Fubuki, Inugami Korone, Houshou Marine, Nekomata Okayu, Usada Pekora, and Hoshimachi Suisei, as well as the other three active Generation 2 members (Nakiri Ayame, Yuzuki Choco, and Oozora Subaru).) appeared at the livestream, as did retired Hololive VTuber Sakamata Chloe.

Around 369,000 people visited Murasaki's graduation livestream at one point. MoguraVR said that "even during her graduation concert, she remained true to her signature 'Murasaki Shion' style until the very end, bringing her career to a memorable finale." Shirokuro of Kai-You found fittingly that "Shion", in being chosen as the livestream's final song, "seemed to encapsulate her deepest feelings regarding her impending graduation". She was the second Generation 2 member to graduate, the first being Minato.

== Discography ==
Title	Year	Peak chart positions		Album
Title	Year	JPN Dig.	JPN DL	Album
"Mage of Violet" (メイジ・オブ・ヴァイオレット)	2021	48	36	Non-album singles
"Chandelier" (シャンデリア)	2022	47	52	Non-album singles
"Cinderella Magic" (シンデレラ・マジック)	2023	—	—	Non-album singles
"Riazyuu: Bokumetu Movement" (リア充★撲滅運動)	2024	—	—	Holohoneygaoka High School -Originals-
"Forgive Me Medicine" (ゴメンねメディスン)	2024	—	—	Non-album singles
"Shion" (シオン)	2025	25	30	Non-album singles
"—" denotes releases that did not chart or were not released in that region.
