= Hololive Production =

Japanese virtual YouTuber agency

- Logo since September 2026
- Native name: ホロライブプロダクション
- Romanized name: Hororaibu Purodakushon
- Type
- Industry: Virtual YouTuber agency
- Headquarters: Mita, Minato, Tokyo, Japan
- Brands: Hololive; Holostars
- Owner: Cover Corporation
- Website: en.hololive.tv; hololivepro.com

Cover Corporation
- Native name: カバー株式会社
- Romanized name: Kabā Kabushiki-gaisha
- Type: Public
- Traded as: TYO: 5253
- ISIN: JP3218500001
- Industry: Virtual Reality (former); Streaming; Concert; Merchandising; Licensing
- Founded: 13 June 2016; 10 years ago
- Founders: Motoaki Tanigo; Ikko Fukuda
- Headquarters: Mita, Minato, Tokyo, Japan
- Area served: Worldwide
- Key people: Motoaki Tanigo (President, CEO & founder); Ikko Fukuda (Director, CTO & co-founder)
- Revenue: ¥43.401 billion (FY2025/3)
- Operating income: ¥8.001 billion (FY2025/3)
- Net income: ¥5.559 billion (FY2025/3)
- Total assets: ¥33.060 billion (FY2025/3)
- Owner: Motoaki Tanigo (36.78 %); 12 West Capital Management LP (7.006 %); Ikko Fukuda (3.971 %); STRIVE, Inc. (2.632 %); Masao Ito (1.418 %); Arcus Investment Ltd. (1.402 %); Kimiyuki Suda (1.271 %); BlackRock (0.57%)
- Number of employees: 679 (May 2025)
- Subsidiaries: CCMC Corp.; Cover USA, inc.
- Website: cover-corp.com

Hololive Production, (Note: Japanese: ホロライブプロダクション, Hepburn: Hororaibu Purodakushon; pronounced [hoɾoɾaibɯ pɯɾodakɯ̥ɕoɴ]) also known as just Hololive (Note: Japanese: ホロライブ, Hepburn: Hororaibu; pronounced [hoɾoɾaibɯ]) (both names stylized in lowercase), is a virtual YouTuber agency owned by Japanese tech entertainment company Cover Corporation. (Note: Japanese: カバー株式会社, Hepburn: Kabā Kabushiki-gaisha; Japanese pronunciation: [kabaː kabuɕiki gaiɕa]) In addition to acting as a multi-channel network, Hololive Production also handles licensing, merchandising, music production and concert organization. As of June 2026, channels operated by Hololive Production had a combined 95.2 million subscribers on YouTube. The agency includes Japanese, Indonesian and English-speaking talents, including several of the most subscribed VTubers on YouTube and some of the most watched female streamers in the world.

The name "Hololive" was initially used for Cover's 3D stream distribution app, launched in December 2017, and later its female VTuber agency, whose first generation debuted from May to June 2018. In December 2019, Hololive was merged with Cover's male Holostars agency and INoNaKa music label under the unified "Hololive Production" brand.

== History ==
=== 2016–2019: Beginnings and growth ===
Cover's logo from 2016 to 2019

Cover Corporation was founded on 13 June 2016 by Motoaki "Yagoo" Tanigo, (Note: Japanese: 谷郷元昭, Hepburn: Tanigō Motoaki) an entrepreneur who had developed video game characters in collaboration with Sanrio at the content company Imagineer and founded various startup companies. Cover at first focused on augmented (AR) and virtual reality (VR) software, and received funding from incubator firms Tokyo VR Startups and Recruit.

At the end of March 2017, the company showcased a tech demo for a program enabling real-time avatar motion capture and interactive, two-way live streaming. According to Tanigo, the idea for a "virtual idol" agency was inspired by other virtual characters, such as Hatsune Miku. Kizuna AI, who began the virtual YouTuber trend in 2016, was another likely inspiration.

Cover debuted Tokino Sora, the first VTuber using the company's avatar capture software, on 7 September 2017. On 21 December, the company released hololive, a smartphone app for iOS and Android enabling users to view virtual character live streams using AR camera technology. On 5 April 2018, Cover removed the application's AR features and changed it into a tool for mapping a user's facial movements onto animated avatars in real-time. This update enabled at-home auditions using the iPhone X. The first generation of Hololive VTubers debuted from May to June 2018, and a second generation followed in August and September. Hololive Gamers, a group specializing in let's plays, debuted in December 2018 and April 2019.

On 8 January 2019, Hololive announced that it had signed a contract with the Chinese video platform Bilibili, under which it would open 15 channels on the platform and simultaneously stream there and on YouTube. It would also begin collaborating with Chinese-speaking volunteers to translate Hololive videos, and start releasing original content for the Chinese market. On 17 May, Cover opened permanent talent auditions in China and Japan.

On 19 May, Cover formed an in-house music label, INoNaKa (INNK) Music, from AZKi and former independent VTuber Hoshimachi Suisei. The 1st generation of Holostars, a new all-male VTuber agency, began debuting in June 2019, followed by more in September and October of the same year. A 2nd generation of Holostars talents debuted in December 2019, and a 3rd generation would later debut in May 2020. A 3rd generation of Hololive, "Hololive Fantasy", debuted from July to August 2019. A first generation of Hololive China, a Chinese-speaking branch active on Bilibili, debuted from September 2019 to January 2020. A second generation of Hololive China later debuted in April 2020.

On 2 December 2019, Cover consolidated its Hololive, INNK Music, and Holostars agencies under a unified brand named Hololive Production; the three entities continued to operate under their respective management teams. On the same day, Hoshimachi Suisei transferred to Hololive from INNK, leaving AZKi as the label's only member. A fourth generation of the original Hololive branch debuted late December 2019 and early January 2020. The generation included VTuber Kiryu Coco, who would later become the most superchatted channel on YouTube.

=== 2020–2022: International expansion ===
Promotional artwork for the "Nonstop Story" concert featuring all VTubers of Hololive Japan up to Generation 3

On 24 January 2020, Cover held "hololive 1st fes. Nonstop Story", a concert at the Toyosu Pit in Kōtō, Tokyo, with AZKi and all 22 pre–4th generation Hololive members. "Nonstop Story" was attended by 3000 people on site with "tens of thousands" more tuning in via livestream. On 21 and 22 December 2020, Cover held "hololive 2nd fes. Beyond the Stage", a two-day pay-per-view livestream follow-up to "Nonstop Story", featuring the same cast as well as the 4th generation members as an opening act, as a collaboration with the Japanese entertainment company Bushiroad (as their official partner). At the concert's end, Cover announced Hololive's first original-only concert, titled "Hololive Idol Project 1st Live 'Bloom,'", which was held on 17 February 2021 at Tokyo Garden Theatre (in-person viewing was later cancelled).

At the end of the concert, Cover announced a multimedia project entitled Hololive Alternative, releasing a promotional video. On 8 August 2021, Hololive announced its horror project titled "Hololive ERROR" with a live-action teaser featuring Tokino Sora. The project was revealed to be a horror game featuring Hololive members playing as in-game NPCs. A demo was released for free on 7 January 2022 in Japanese while the full version of the game was released on 16 September on Steam with both Japanese and English subtitles.

A new branch of Hololive composed of Indonesian-speaking VTubers, named Hololive Indonesia, debuted its first generation in April 2020; a second generation of the branch later debuted in December 2020; A third generation of the branch debuted in March 2022. A fifth generation of the main Hololive branch debuted in August 2020. A new English-language Hololive branch, Hololive English, debuted in September 2020. IRyS, an English-language "VSinger", debuted as part of "Project: Hope" on 11 July 2021. Hololive Council, a second generation of English-language Vtubers, debuted on 22 August 2021. The sixth generation of the main Hololive branch debuted in late November 2021.

On 29 December 2021, Cover announced the transfer of AZKi from INNK into the main Hololive branch. As part of the transfer process, INNK would be dissolved and its founder Tsuranimizu would step down from the position of AZKi's manager. The process was completed in April 2022.

On 24 February 2022, Cover Corporation announced the termination of their contract with Hololive Generation 3's Uruha Rushia, citing violations of her contract that "caused the company to take reputational damage". At the moment of her termination, Uruha Rushia was the highest superchat earner on YouTube and within Hololive Production, the second to hold these titles after Kiryu Coco, who retired in 2021.

In June 2022, Hololive GAMERS member Inugami Korone became the official brand ambassador for the Sonic the Hedgehog franchise in Japan. She would later appear in the Sonic the Hedgehog 2 film as the voice actress for one of the characters in the Japanese dub, and Korone-themed downloadable content would be released for the game Sonic Frontiers.

On 18 July 2022, Cover revealed their first English-speaking male group, Holostars English Tempus, who were set to debut at the end of the same week.

On 18 and 19 March 2023, the "Hololive 4th fes. Our Bright Parade" group concert was held at Makuhari Messe in Chiba. It was the first in-person group concert since the 1st fes., as the COVID-19 pandemic had caused the December 2020 "Hololive 2nd fes. Beyond the Stage" and March 2022 "Hololive 3rd fes. Link Your Wish" to be online-only events without an in-person audience.

==== Taiwan controversy and suspensions ====
In September 2020, Kiryu Coco and Akai Haato each mentioned Taiwan on-stream while discussing YouTube channel analytics, which then listed Taiwan as a country in the Japanese interface. Their comments sparked outrage among viewers in mainland China, and were followed by a statement from Cover in Japanese, English, and Chinese on 27 September. In it, the company faulted the talents for "making statements insensitive to certain nationalities" and for "divulging confidential YouTube channel analytics information". Each received a three-week suspension from all activities.

In a separate Chinese-only statement posted earlier on Bilibili, Cover had stated that Coco and Haato's comments did not reflect its policy on China, and reaffirmed its support for the One China policy and its commitment to doing business in the country. Three days later, the company released another statement addressing the discrepancies between the messages, stating that the Bilibili statement was released "due to the desire to adapt it to the needs of the audience". Cover apologized for confusion it had caused, and announced changes in its procedure for releasing regional statements and the formation of a committee to prevent similar incidents. On 19 October, both resumed their streaming activities as scheduled.

After a "rush of harassment, reports, and apparent boycotting on Bilibili", all six members of Hololive China retired on different dates in late 2020.

=== 2023–2025: Initial public offering ===
Logo of Hololive Production until September 2026

On 27 March 2023, Cover underwent an IPO and began trading on the Tokyo Stock Exchange.

On 11 May 2023, Cover announced the opening of a new studio facility, which took over 2.7 billion yen to construct. With the goal of increasing speed, creative freedom, and production quality, the new facility includes motion capture, green screen filming, and recording functions all within a single floor, with a total area exceeding ten tennis courts. The motion capture room is equipped with over 200 VICON cameras to improve tracking precision, while the recording studio meets professional music industry standards and is capable of producing album-quality audio.

In July 2023, Hololive Production announced a joint imprint label, Holo-n, with Universal Music Japan sublabel EMI Records. Holo-n's first undertaking was Blue Journey, a music group of Hololive-affiliated VTubers which featured songs with melancholic and negative emotions.

On 15 November 2023, Cover announced an amendment of their community works guideline which allow the monetization of fanworks on video sharing platform such as YouTube. They also introduced a new set of guidelines specifically for fans games as well as unveiling their own publishing label for fangames named "holo indie". The announcement came in the wake of several popular Hololive fangames releasing on Steam throughout 2023 such as HoloCure and Idol Showdown. The brand is part of Cover's then newly established CCMC Corp. (Creator Community Company) subsidiary which focuses on licensing their Hololive IP for game developers.

On 12 March 2024, Cover revealed that they would be establishing a U.S.-based subsidiary to facilitate localized event planning and sales. Cover USA opened its office in Los Angeles in July 2024. The same month, Cover hosted the "hololive SUPER EXPO 2024" and "5th Fes. Capture the Momen" events in Tokyo, attracting a record-breaking number of 86,000+ attendees to the event.

In July 2024, Hololive conducted its first collaboration with a U.S. professional sports team, sponsoring a theme night at a Los Angeles Dodgers Major League Baseball game on July 5, including special merchandise and appearances by talent such as Gawr Gura, Pekora, and Suisei; the Los Angeles Times noted that this promotion (which also coincided with Anime Expo at the Los Angeles Convention Center) served a dual purpose of helping Hololive expand its audience, while also helping to promote the team to its Japanese fanbase amid their signing of Shohei Ohtani. The collaboration returned in the 2025 season, featuring Hololive English members Ninomae Ina'nis, IRyS, and Koseki Bijou.

In October 2025, Hololive member Hoshimachi Suisei was featured on the cover of Forbes Japan and was also named on the magazine's "30 Under 30" list.

=== 2026–present: Organizational restructuring and production renewal ===
On 22 March 2026, Hoshimachi Suisei announced the launch of her personal music agency, Studio Stellar. In the following livestream, Hoshimachi clarified that the move does not represent a departure from Hololive, stating that she would continue streaming activities as a Hololive member and will continue to participate in Hololive events and collaborations. Cover subsequently issued a statement confirming its support for the new arrangement, framing it as a step toward advancing VTuber culture into its next stage.

On 3 April 2026, Cover announced a "change in management structure" for Holostars, effective as of the 2026-2027 fiscal year, citing business sustainability concerns resulting in a closure of "company-led activities" in favor of a "focus on individual activities". The changes were expected to limit or end company-led projects and initiatives, company studio support, merchandise offerings, and music production. This change is expected to apply solely to Holostars' Japanese talents and does not affect Holostars EN. On 26 May 2026, Cover announced that six out of the twelve Japanese Holostars talents at the time decided to end their streaming activities, with their final streams to be held throughout June and July.

In May 2026, Cover reported revenue of 49.33 billion yen and net profit of 3.016 billion yen for the 2025-2026 fiscal year. Profit declined substantially from the previous year, with results affected by one-time charges including a 3.3 billion yen impairment related to the discontinued metaverse project Holoearth. In a subsequent press conference, CEO Motoaki Tanigo acknowledged that the company had overextended itself by pursuing too broad a strategy, and announced a shift toward concentrating capital on talent development and artist value creation as the core medium-to-long-term strategy. Tanigo also admitted that the male talent division Holostars had suffered from a supply-side management approach that failed to account for the distinct preferences of its female audience. Looking ahead, Tanigo stated that Cover plans to invest in proprietary streaming technology, launch a new trainee program called mekPark, and expand cross-media projects and live events.

On 7 September 2026, the ninth anniversary of Hololive Production, Cover launched the news program "hololive Next" and began a countdown campaign toward the agency's tenth anniversary on 7 September 2027. The announcement introduced a production-wide renewal built around three changes: a redesigned Hololive Production logo, the consolidation of the previously region- and group-centered Hololive brand structure into a single "hololive" brand, and a multi-year program of individual visual updates for talents. The brand consolidation brought Hololive Indonesia, Hololive English and Hololive DEV_IS together with the Japanese Hololive branch under one Hololive identity, with Cover stating that the change was intended to allow talents to collaborate across regional and group boundaries more freely. Tokino Sora was announced as the first talent to receive a visual update under the new program.

The same announcement introduced "hololive raku", a new streaming application intended for Hololive Production talents. The application incorporates high-quality virtual stages, items and visual effects developed for studio productions and Holoearth into at-home streams. Cover also announced Hololive Production's first television anime project, produced by Studio Kai. The project was initially promoted under the abbreviated title "Odeholo", with further details revealed on 23 September 2026 with the full title Hololive: Let's Head Out!.

Cover additionally announced "ASOBI★MAWARI-TAI!", described as Hololive Production's first new unit in nearly two years. The identities of its new talents were later revealed to be Hyakuto Kyoko, Achichi Mela, Suzuna Tsuzuri, and Sorashina Sopia.

== Business ==
Along with its major competitor Nijisanji, a VTuber agency owned by Anycolor, Inc., Hololive Production dominates the corporate VTuber market as of 2022. By "harness[ing] the entertainment value of both streaming and J-pop idol groups", Cover operates at a scale not possible for independent VTubers, and has used its funding to create merchandise, produce music, and host live 3D events. As of 2021, Cover has held three major funding rounds:

- August 2017 – 30 million yen (US$280,000) in seed funding from venture capital firms Mizuho Capital, TLM, and angel investors
- June 2018 – 200 million yen (US$1.9 million) in a Series A round from GREE Ventures, OLM Ventures, and Mizuho Capital
- May 2020 – 700 million yen (US$6.6 million) from various sources, including Hakuhodo DY Ventures and SMBC Venture Capital

Most Hololive streamers work full-time, while others stream as a side job. According to data collection site Playboard, the all-time top Super Chat earners in history are channels run by Hololive talents: Uruha Rushia, Kiryu Coco, Usada Pekora and Houshou Marine. Other talents featured in the all-time top 10 include Minato Aqua, Amane Kanata and Yukihana Lamy.

By September 2020, Hololive channels had more than 10 million combined subscribers on YouTube, and 10 million additional combined subscribers on Chinese platform Bilibili. As of November 2021, the agency has accumulated over 50 million subscribers across its 80+ channels on YouTube. On 22 October 2020, English VTuber Gawr Gura became the first Hololive member to reach 1 million YouTube subscribers; on 17 January 2021, she became the first Hololive member to reach 2 million subscribers on the platform and the second VTuber to do so, after Kizuna AI. Gawr Gura became the first VTuber to reach 3 million subscribers on YouTube on 4 July 2021, having surpassed Kizuna AI at 2.97 million on 30 June.

According to data analysis firm Stream Charts, Usada Pekora is one of the most popular female streamers globally by watch hours including in 2023 where she was number one. Alongside her, Hakui Koyori, Sakura Miko and Oozora Subaru was also among the top 10 for that year ranking.

According to Tanigo, Hololive's primary audience are mostly males in their mid-teens to mid-thirties, with Japanese fans being mostly those who are interested in video games while overseas viewers are more likely to be anime fans specifically. Hololive's overseas audiences are primarily from North America and Asia, especially southeast Asia. According to Cover's FY2025/3 Financial Report, overseas viewers represented 30% of their viewership and contributed 10 billion yen worth of the revenue for that year (slightly less than a quarter of their total revenue).

CEO Motoaki Tanigo was selected as one of the Japan's Top 20 Entrepreneurs by Forbes Japan in its January 2022 issue.

=== Studio ===
Cover Corp invested 2.7 billion yen for a new motion capture studio, which opened in May 2023. The facility includes motion capture, green screen filming, and recording functions. The motion capture room is equipped with over 200 VICON cameras to improve tracking precision. The recording equipment is capable of producing music industry standard audio capture. With a space equivalent to ten tennis courts, the studio is one of the largest of its kind in Japan.

=== Business operations post-IPO ===
According to its quarterly financial results and presentations, Cover operates as a vertically integrated entertainment business, built around 4 revenue streams:

1. Streaming/Content
2. Concert/Events
3. Merchandising
4. Licensing/Collaborations.

Cover describes its business model as a "flywheel," where talents create valued content that drives community growth, and, in turn, fuels cross-business monetization through live events, merchandise, trading card games, and IP licensing partnerships.

For the fiscal year ended March 31, 2026, Cover reported revenue of 49.33 billion yen, a 13.7% year-on-year increase, driven primarily by strong performance in Concerts/Events (+18.7%) and Licensing/Collaborations (+25.3%). Operating profit declined 11.8% YoY to 7.06 billion yen, and net profit fell 45.7% to 3.02 billion yen. The earnings decline was largely attributable to one-time non-cash charges: a 3.3 billion yen impairment loss on assets related to the discontinued metaverse project "holoEarth," and 1.8 billion yen in write-downs of slow-moving merchandise inventory accumulated during an SKU expansion period in 2023 and 2024. Excluding these charges, management indicates that core cash generation continued to grow steadily.

In response to the results, Cover has formally transitioned from a "quantitative expansion" phase to a "qualitative expansion" phase, concentrating capital investment on talent value creation as its central medium-to-long-term strategy. Key operational priorities include establishing a structured talent development pipeline through permanent auditions and the newly launched trainee program "mekPark", integrating holoEarth's accumulated technologies into existing streaming infrastructure, expanding global licensing and supply chain operations, and releasing its first major smartphone title, hololive Dreams, in FY2027. The company has also implemented organizational restructuring to simplify decision-making and strengthen investment evaluation discipline.

In its FY2026/3 financial report and the subsequent press conference, CEO Motoaki Tanigo stated that Cover has outlined a FY2027 revenue of 51.35 billion yen and operating profit of approximately 7.0 billion yen, noting a front-loaded investment stance in the first half as it builds out talent management and creative production systems. Medium-term targets remain unchanged at 100 billion yen in revenue and 25 billion yen in operating profit by FY2030, to be achieved primarily through organic growth with strategic merger and acquisition and external partnerships remaining open options. The company also authorized a share buyback program of up to 3 billion yen through July 2026 as part of its capital efficiency initiatives.

== Talents ==
Below are all active and former talents of Hololive. Following the September 2026 production renewal, the previously separate Hololive regional and group brands, including Hololive Indonesia, Hololive English and Hololive DEV_IS, were consolidated under a single "hololive" brand. The group labels below are retained to identify the cohorts and branches under which talents originally debuted.

Hololive Production Structure
(Dash line indicates defunct branches)

Cover Corp
Hololive Production	mekPark
InNoNaka; Music	HoloAN	Hololive	Holostars
Hololive; China	Hololive; DEV_IS	Hololive (Japan)	Hololive; English	Hololive; Indonesia	Holostars (Japan)	Holostars; English

=== Hololive ===
==== Hololive (Japan) ====
Generation 0

- Tokino Sora (ときのそら)
- Roboco-san [ja] (ロボ子さん)
- Sakura Miko (さくらみこ)
- Hoshimachi Suisei (星街すいせい) (Note: Former member of INNK)
- AZKi [ja]

Generation 1

- Aki Rosenthal [ja] (アキ・ローゼンタール)
- Akai Haato (赤井はあと)
- Shirakami Fubuki (白上フブキ)
- Natsuiro Matsuri (夏色まつり)

Generation 2

- Nakiri Ayame [ja] (百鬼あやめ)
- Yuzuki Choco [ja] (癒月ちょこ)
- Oozora Subaru [ja] (大空スバル)

Hololive GAMERS

- Shirakami Fubuki (白上フブキ)
- Ookami Mio (大神ミオ)
- Nekomata Okayu (猫又おかゆ)
- Inugami Korone (戌神ころね)

Generation 3 (Hololive Fantasy)

- Usada Pekora (兎田ぺこら)
- Shiranui Flare [ja] (不知火フレア)
- Shirogane Noel (白銀ノエル)
- Houshou Marine (宝鐘マリン)

Generation 4 (holoForce)

- Tsunomaki Watame (角巻わため)
- Tokoyami Towa (常闇トワ)
- Himemori Luna [ja] (姫森ルーナ)

Generation 5 (NePoLaBo) (Note: Formerly holoFive before Mano Aloe's retirement)

- Yukihana Lamy (雪花ラミィ)
- Momosuzu Nene (桃鈴ねね)
- Shishiro Botan (獅白ぼたん)
- Omaru Polka [ja] (尾丸ポルカ)

Generation 6 (Secret Society holoX)

- La+ Darknesss [ja] (ラプラス・ダークネス)
- Takane Lui (鷹嶺ルイ)
- Hakui Koyori (博衣こより)
- Kazama Iroha [ja] (風真いろは)

==== Hololive DEV_IS ====
ReGloss

- Otonose Kanade (音乃瀬奏)
- Ichijou Ririka [ja] (一条莉々華)
- Juufuutei Raden (儒烏風亭らでん)
- Todoroki Hajime (轟はじめ)

FLOW GLOW

- Isaki Riona (響咲 リオナ)
- Koganei Niko (虎金妃笑虎)
- Mizumiya Su (水宮枢)
- Rindo Chihaya (輪堂千速)
- Kikirara Vivi (綺々羅々ヴィヴィ)

==== Hololive Indonesia ====
AREA 15

- Ayunda Risu (アユンダ・リス)
- Moona Hoshinova (ムーナ・ホシノヴァ)
- Airani Iofifteen (アイラニ・イオフィフティーン)

holoro

- Kureiji Ollie (クレイジー・オリー)
- Anya Melfissa (アーニャ・メルフィッサ)
- Pavolia Reine (パヴォリア・レイネ)

holoh3ro

- Vestia Zeta (ベスティア・ゼータ)
- Kaela Kovalskia (カエラ・コヴァルスキア)
- Kobo Kanaeru [ja; id] (こぼ・かなえる)

==== Hololive English ====
Myth

- Mori Calliope (森カリオペ) (Note: Previously named 森美声 in Japanese with the same pronunciation. Officially renamed on 1 September 2021.)
- Takanashi Kiara (小鳥遊キアラ)
- Ninomae Ina'nis (一伊那尓栖)

Promise (Note: Formerly two separate groups, Project: Hope and Council)

- IRyS
- Ouro Kronii (オーロ・クロニー)
- Hakos Baelz (ハコス・ベールズ)

Advent

- Shiori Novella (シオリ・ノヴェラ)
- Koseki Bijou (古石ビジュー)
- Nerissa Ravencroft (ネリッサ・レイヴンクロフト)
- Fuwawa Abyssgard (フワワ・アビスガード) (Note: They form a single unit, FuwaMoco, which operates on a single channel.)
- Mococo Abyssgard (モココ・アビスガード)

Justice

- Elizabeth Rose Bloodflame (エリザベス・ローズ・ブラッドフレイム)
- Gigi Murin (ジジ・ムリン)
- Cecilia Immergreen (セシリア・イマーグリーン)
- Raora Panthera (ラオーラ・パンテーラ)

==== Post-merger ====
ASOBI★MAWARI-TAI!

- Hyakuto Kyoko (百灯キョーコ)
- Achichi Mela (熱千めら)
- Suzuna Tsuzuri (鈴隝つづり)
- Sorashina Sopia (宙科そぴあ)

=== Holostars ===
==== Holostars (Japan) ====
Generation 1

- Kanade Izuru (奏手イヅル)

Generation 2 (SunTempo)

- Astel Leda (アステル・レダ)
- Yukoku Roberu [ja] (夕刻ロベル)

Generation 3 (MaFia) (Note: Formerly TriNero before Tsukishita Kaoru's retirement)

- Aragami Oga (荒咬オウガ)

UPROAR!!

- Yatogami Fuma (夜十神封魔)
- Utsugi Uyu (羽継烏有)

==== Holostars English ====
TEMPUS Headquarters

- Regis Altare (リージス・アルテア)
- Axel Syrios (アクセル・シリオス)

TEMPUS Vanguard

- Gavis Bettel (ガビス・ベッテル)
- Machina X Flayon (マキナ・X・フレオン)
- Banzoin Hakka (万象院ハッカ)
- Josuiji Shinri (定水寺シンリ)

ARMIS

- Jurard T Rexford (ジュラルド・ティー・レクスフォード)
- Goldbullet (ゴールドブレット)
- Octavio (オクタビオ)
- Crimzon Ruze (クリムゾン・ルーズ)

=== holoAN ===
Different from the main talents, these are supporting staff members with virtual avatars who host streams for official channels among other promotional duties.

- Izuki Michiru (井月みちる)
- Hanazono Sayaka (花園さやか)
- Kazeshiro Yuki (風白ゆき)

=== mekPark ===
Under Cover Corporation but not part of Hololive Production, these are VTuber trainees who are in their pre-debut stage.

Unit B

- Yoinagi Neon (宵凪ネオン)
- Reimei Mira (玲銘ミラ)
- Kiyosumi Lyra (清澄ライラ)

ACHRORA

- Sumishio Sayana (墨汐さやな)
- Rumigaki Rirara (琉海垣りらら)
- Yuikawa Hinami (由比河ひなみ)

=== Former talents ===
Hololive

- Hitomi Chris (人見クリス)
- Mano Aloe (魔乃アロエ)
- Kiryu Coco [ja] (桐生ココ)
- Uruha Rushia [ja] (潤羽るしあ)
- Yozora Mel [ja] (夜空メル)
- Minato Aqua (湊あくあ)
- Sakamata Chloe (沙花叉クロヱ) (Note: Indicates talents who have ceased streaming activities but remain affiliated with Hololive Production.)
- Murasaki Shion (紫咲シオン)
- Amane Kanata (天音かなた)

Hololive DEV_IS

- Hiodoshi Ao [ja] (火威青)

Hololive English

- Tsukumo Sana (九十九佐命)
- Watson Amelia (ワトソン・アメリア)
- Ceres Fauna (セレス・ファウナ)
- Nanashi Mumei (七詩ムメイ)
- Gawr Gura (がうる・ぐら)

Hololive China

- Yogiri (夜霧)
- Civia (希薇娅)
- Spade Echo (黑桃影)
- Doris (朵莉丝)
- Rosalyn (罗莎琳)
- Artia (阿媂娅)

Holostars

- Kagami Kira (鏡見キラ)
- Yakushiji Suzaku (薬師寺朱雀)
- Tsukishita Kaoru (月下カオル)
- Hizaki Gamma (緋崎ガンマ)
- Hanasaki Miyabi (花咲みやび)
- Kishido Temma (岸堂天真)
- Rikka [ja] (律可)
- Arurandeisu (アルランディス)
- Minase Rio (水無世燐央)
- Kageyama Shien (影山シエン)

Holostars English

- Magni Dezmond (マグニ・デズモンド)
- Noir Vesper (ノワール・ヴェスパー)

Staff (Note: Supporting staff members who were given virtual avatars and hosted on official streams.)

- Friend A (友人A, Yuujin A)
- Harusaki Nodoka (春先のどか)

== Selected discography ==
=== Hololive Idol Project ===
Many group releases have been performed by Hololive Idol Project, a group that consists of different talents for each release.

==== Albums ====
Title	Details	Catalog number	Peak chart position			Notes
Title	Details	Catalog number	JPN	JPN Comb.	JPN Hot	Notes
Bouquet	Release date: 21 April 2021; Label: Cover Corp.; Format: CD, digital download, streaming	HOLO-001	4	4	4	Released as lead up to "Bloom"
Bouquet (Midnight ver.)	Release date: 7 May 2021; Label: Cover corp.; Format: Streaming	CVRD-043	—	—	—	Lo-fi remixes of the above

==== Extended plays ====
Title	Details	Catalog number
Hololive Summer 2022	Release date: 1 September 2022; Label: Cover Corp.; Format: Digital download, streaming	CVRD-208

==== Singles ====
Title	Year	Peak chart positions			Album	Notes	Ref.
Title	Year	JPN DS	JPN Hot	JPN DL	Album	Notes	Ref.
"Shiny Smily Story" (Performed by Tokino Sora, Roboco-san, Sakura Miko, Yozora Mel, Aki Rosenthal, Akai Haato, Shirakami Fubuki, Natsuiro Matsuri, Minato Aqua, Murasaki Shion, Nakiri Ayame, Yuzuki Choco, Oozora Subaru, Ookami Mio, Nekomata Okayu, and Inugami Korone)	2019	30	—	21	Bouquet (Note: Included only in the digital release of the album)	Released as lead up to "Nonstop Story"	
"Yumemiru Sora e" (夢見る空へ) (Performed by Yozora Mel, Aki Rosenthal, Akai Haato, Shirakami Fubuki, and Natsuiro Matsuri)	2020	40	—	19	Bouquet	Released as lead up to "Nonstop Story"	
"Kirameki Rider☆" (キラメキライダー☆) (Performed by Tokino Sora, Roboco-san, Shirakami Fubuki, Minato Aqua, and Shirogane Noel)	2020	24	—	10	Bouquet	Released as lead up to "Nonstop Story"	
"Halloween Night, Tonight!" (今宵はHalloween Night!) (Performed by Yozora Mel, Murasaki Shion, Yuzuki Choco, and Uruha Rushia)	2020	38	—	21	Bouquet		
"Blue Clapper" (Performed by Yukihana Lamy, Momosuzu Nene, Shishiro Botan, and Omaru Polka)	2020	20	76	12	Bouquet	Released as lead up to "Bloom"	
"Hyakka Ryoran Hanafubuki" (百花繚乱花吹雪) (Performed by Shirakami Fubuki, Nakiri Ayame, and Ookami Mio)	2020	20	75	13	Bouquet	Released as lead up to "Bloom"	
"Shijoshugi Adtruck" (至上主義アドトラック) (Performed by Natsuiro Matsuri, Ookami Mio, and Shiranui Flare)	2021	19	—	13	Bouquet	Released as lead up to "Bloom"	
"Candy-Go-Round" (Performed by Roboco-san, Yozora Mel, Aki Rosenthal, Minato Aqua, and Shiranui Flare)	2021	25	—	19	Bouquet	Released as lead up to "Bloom"	
"Daily Diary" (でいり〜だいあり〜！) (Performed by Natsuiro Matsuri, Oozora Subaru, Sakura Miko, Shirogane Noel, and Houshou Marine)	2021	26	—	16	Bouquet	Released as lead up to "Bloom"	
"Suspect" (Performed by Roboco-san, Aki Rosenthal, and Nakiri Ayame)	2021	26	—	20	Bouquet	Released as lead up to "Bloom"	
"Stardust Song" (Performed by Shiranui Flare, Amane Kanata, Tokoyami Towa)	2021	16	—	13	Bouquet	Released as lead up to "Bloom"	
"Dreaming Days" (Performed by Shirakami Fubuki, Natsuiro Matsuri, Murasaki Shion, Nakiri Ayame, Yuzuki Choco, Oozora Subaru, Usada Pekora, Houshou Marine, and Amane Kanata)	2021	16	—	15	Bouquet	Released as lead up to "Bloom"	
"AsuiroClearSky" (あすいろClearSky) (Performed by Roboco-san, Yozora Mel, Aki Rosenthal, Natsuiro Matsuri, Minato Aqua, Ookami Mio, Sakura Miko, Shiranui Flare, and Tokoyami Towa)	2021	24	—	8	Bouquet	Released as lead up to "Bloom"	
"Prism Melody" (Performed by Hoshimachi Suisei, Yozora Mel, Aki Rosenthal, Minato Aqua, Oozora Subaru, Nekomata Okayu, Usada Pekora, Tsunomaki Watame, Tokoyami Towa, and Momosuzu Nene)	2022	34	—	7	Non-album single	Released as lead up to "Link Your Wish"	
"Tonde K! hololive summer" (飛んでK！ホロライブサマー) (Performed by all members of Hololive (Japan) at time of release)	2022	—	—	37	hololive Summer 2022		
"hololive ondo" (ホロメン音頭) (Performed by Tokino Sora, Roboco-san, AZKi, Sakura Miko, Yozora Mel, Shirakami Fubuki, Natsuiro Matsuri, Akai Haato, Minato Aqua, Murasaki Shion, Yuzuki Choco, Oozora Subaru, Nekomata Okayu, Inugami Korone, Usada Pekora, Shiranui Flare, Houshou Marine, Amane Kanata, Tsunomaki Watame, Tokoyami Towa, Yukihana Lamy, Momosuzu Nene, Omaru Polka, La+ Darknesss, Takane Lui, Hakui Koyori, and Sakamata Chloe)	2022	—	—	—	hololive Summer 2022		
"Sparklers" (Performed by Hoshimachi Suisei, Aki Rosenthal, Nakiri Ayame, Ookami Mio, Shirogane Noel, Himemori Luna, Shishiro Botan, and Kazama Iroha)	2022	—	—	39	hololive Summer 2022		
"Our Bright Parade" (Performed by Shirakami Fubuki, Sakura Miko, Amane Kanata, Yukihana Lamy, Hakui Koyori, Sakamata Chloe, Ayunda Risu, and Watson Amelia)	2023	20	—	18	Non-album singles	Released as lead up to "Our Bright Parade"	
"Seishun Archive" (Performed by Tokino Sora, Hoshimachi Suisei, Shirakami Fubuki, Minato Aqua, Amane Kanata, Moona Hoshinova, Airani Iofifteen, Takanashi Kiara, and Gawr Gura)	2023	—	—	37	Non-album singles	Released as lead up to "Splash Party"	
"Aventure Holic" (アバンチュール♡ホリック) (Performed by Yuzuki Choco, Nekomata Okayu, Houshou Marine, Shirogane Noel, Tokoyami Towa, Yukihana Lamy, Pavolia Reine, Celes Fauna, and Ouro Kronii)	2023	—	—	58	Non-album singles		
"Merry Holy Date♡" (Performed by Nakiri Ayame, Nekomata Okayu, Inugami Korone, Shirogane Noel, Yukihana Lamy, Hakui Koyori, and Sakamata Chloe)	2023	—	—	—	Non-album singles	Released as lead up to "Sweet Happy Holiday"	
"Capture The Moment" (Performed by Tokino Sora, Ookami Mio, Usada Pekora, Amane Kanata, Momosuzu Nene, Kazama Iroha, Kobo Kanaeru, and IRyS)	2024	32	—	36	Non-album singles	Released as lead up to "Capture The Moment"	
"Can You Do the hololive? hololive SUPER EXPO 2024 ver." (ホロライブ言えるかな？hololive SUPER EXPO 2024 ver.) (Performed by Tsunomaki Watame featuring all members of Hololive (Japan), Hololive Indonesia, Hololive English, and Hololive DEV_IS at time of release)	2024	—	—	—	Non-album singles		
"Color Rise Harmony" (Performed by Natsuiro Matsuri, Shiranui Flare, Omaru Polka, La+ Darknesss, Moona Hoshinova, Kureiji Ollie, Hakos Baelz, and Koseki Bijou)	2025	45	—	53	Non-album singles	Released as lead up to "Color Rise Harmony"	
"Aizome Summer Time!!" (藍染サマータイム!!) (Performed by Usada Pekora, Tsunomaki Watame, Momosuzu Nene, Ayunda Risu, Kobo Kanaeru, Fuwawa Abyssgard, and Mococo Abyssgard)	2025	—	—	—	Non-album singles		
"Ridin' on Dreams" (Performed by AZKi, Sakura Miko, Shirogane Noel, Tsunomaki Watame, Yukihana Lamy, Airani Iofifteen, Nerissa Ravencroft, and Ichijou Ririka)	2026	40	—	52	Non-album singles		
"yumeiro wonder" (夢色ワンダー) (Performed by all members of Hololive (Japan), Hololive Indonesia, Hololive English, and Hololive DEV_IS at time of release)	2026	—	—	—	Non-album singles	Written for Hololive Dreams	
"Gimmick Gimmick Entertainment" (ギミギミエンターテイメント) (Performed by Roboco-san, Akai Haato, Nekomata Okayu, Inugami Korone, Usada Pekora, Moona Hoshinova, Kaela Kovalskia, Takanashi Kiara, Shiori Novella, and Nerissa Ravencroft)	2026	—	—	—	Non-album singles	Written for Hololive Dreams	
"Paradise!" (Performed by Houshou Marine, Hakui Koyori, Hakos Baelz, Omaru Polka, Yukihana Lamy, Kobo Kanaeru, and Ichijou Ririka)	2026	—	—	—	Non-album singles	Written for Hololive Dreams	
"—" denotes releases that did not chart.

=== Holostars ===
==== Extended play ====
Title	Release date	Catalog number	Peak chart position
Title	Release date	Catalog number	JPN
Follow Us	31 August 2022	HOLO-003	47

==== Singles ====
Title	Year	Album	Ref.
"Just Follow Stars" (Performed by all Holostars members at time of release)	2021	Follow Us	
"Pentas" (Performed by Arurandeisu, Rikka, Yukoku Roberu, Kageyama Shien, and Aragami Oga)	2021	Follow Us	
"Magic Word Orchestra" (Performed by Hanasaki Miyabi, Kanade Izuru, Astel Leda, and Kishido Temma)	2021	Follow Us	
"Journey to Find Stars" (Performed by all Holostars members at time of release)	2021	Follow Us	
"Find It" (Performed by all Holostars members at time of release)	2022	Follow Us	
"Night Light Side" (ナイト ライト サイド) (Performed by Kageyama Shien and Aragami Oga)	2022	Non-album singles	
"Last Sparkle" (Performed by Astel Leda, Kishido Temma, and Yukoku Roberu)	2022	Non-album singles	
"Compass" (Performed by Hanasaki Miyabi, Kanade Izuru, Arurandeisu, and Rikka)	2022	Non-album singles	
"We are the Holostars!!" (Performed by all Holostars members at time of release)	2023	Non-album singles	
"Kaleido Parade" (カレイドパレード) (Performed by all Holostars members at time of release as Holostars & Uproar!!)	2024	Non-album singles	
"Yuuzutsu to Kaerimichi" (夕星と帰り道) (Performed by all Holostars members at time of release as Holostars & Uproar!!)	2024	Non-album singles	
"We are the Holostars!! & Uproar!! -Next-" (Performed by all Holostars members at time of release as Holostars & Uproar!!)	2025	Non-album singles	

== Awards and nominations ==
Year	Ceremony	Category	Nominee	Result	Ref.
2022	NexTone Award	Special	hololive Production	Won	
2023	The Vtuber Awards	Best Music VTuber	Mori Calliope	Won	
2023	The Vtuber Awards	Best Music VTuber	Hoshimachi Suisei	Nominated	
2023	The Vtuber Awards	Best Art VTuber	Ninomae Ina'nis	Won	
2023	The Vtuber Awards	Best FPS VTuber	Shishiro Botan	Nominated	
2023	The Vtuber Awards	Best Minecraft VTuber	Ceres Fauna	Nominated	
2023	The Vtuber Awards	Best Minecraft VTuber	Kaela Kovalskia	Won	
2023	The Vtuber Awards	Best Roleplay/ASMR VTuber	Ceres Fauna	Won	
2023	The Vtuber Awards	Best Just Chatting/Zatsu VTuber	Takanashi Kiara	Nominated	
2023	The Vtuber Awards	Most Chaotic VTuber	Kobo Kanaeru	Won	
2023	The Vtuber Awards	League of Their Own	FuwaMoco	Won	
2023	The Vtuber Awards	League of Their Own	Houshou Marine	Nominated	
2023	The Vtuber Awards	Best VTuber Org	hololive Production	Won	
2023	The Vtuber Awards	Most Dedicated Fanbase	Chumbuds	Won	
2023	The Vtuber Awards	Best Concert Event	Connect the World	Won	
2023	The Vtuber Awards	Best Streamed Event	Hololive Sports Festival	Nominated	
2023	The Vtuber Awards	Stream Game of the Year	HoloCure – Save the Fans!	Nominated	
2023	The Vtuber Awards	Gamer of the Year	Koseki Bijou	Nominated	
2023	The Vtuber Awards	VTuber of the Year	Usada Pekora	Nominated	
2024	The Game Awards	Content Creator of the Year	Usada Pekora	Nominated	
2024	The Vtuber Awards	Best Music VTuber	Mori Calliope	Nominated	
2024	The Vtuber Awards	Best Music VTuber	Hoshimachi Suisei	Won	
2024	The Vtuber Awards	Best Art VTuber	Ninomae Ina'nis	Nominated	
2024	The Vtuber Awards	Best Art VTuber	Raora Panthera	Won	
2024	The Vtuber Awards	Best FPS VTuber	Shishiro Botan	Nominated	
2024	The Vtuber Awards	Best Roleplay/ASMR VTuber	Ceres Fauna	Won	
2024	The Vtuber Awards	Best Just Chatting/Zatsu VTuber	Ceres Fauna	Won	
2024	The Vtuber Awards	Funniest VTuber	Koseki Bijou	Nominated	
2024	The Vtuber Awards	Funniest VTuber	Gigi Murin	Nominated	
2024	The Vtuber Awards	Most Chaotic VTuber	Kobo Kanaeru	Nominated	
2024	The Vtuber Awards	Most Chaotic VTuber	Gigi Murin	Won	
2024	The Vtuber Awards	Miss VTuber	Takanashi Kiara	Won	
2024	The Vtuber Awards	Mister VTuber	Gavis Bettel	Nominated	
2024	The Vtuber Awards	League of Their Own	Takanashi Kiara	Nominated	
2024	The Vtuber Awards	League of Their Own	Houshou Marine	Nominated	
2024	The Vtuber Awards	Best VTuber Org	hololive Production	Won	
2024	The Vtuber Awards	Most Dedicated Fanbase	Jailbirds (Nerissa Ravencroft)	Nominated	
2024	The Vtuber Awards	Best VTuber Event	HoloGTA - Hololive	Won	
2024	The Vtuber Awards	Best VTuber Event	Breaking Dimensions	Nominated	
2024	The Vtuber Awards	Gamer of the Year	Koseki Bijou	Nominated	
2024	The Vtuber Awards	Gamer of the Year	Kaela Kovalskia	Nominated	
2024	The Vtuber Awards	VTuber of the Year	FuwaMoco	Won	
2024	Vtuber Awards Indonesia	Most Educational	Airani Iofiteen	Won	
2024	Vtuber Awards Indonesia	Most Educational	Pavolia Reine	Nominated	
2024	Vtuber Awards Indonesia	Most Chaotic	Ayunda Risu	Nominated	
2024	Vtuber Awards Indonesia	Most Chaotic	Kureji Ollie	Nominated	
2024	Vtuber Awards Indonesia	Best Gamer	Kaela Kovalskia	Nominated	
2024	Vtuber Awards Indonesia	Best Vtuber Organization	Hololive Indonesia	Won	
2024	Vtuber Awards Indonesia	Vtuber of The Year	Kobo Kanaeru	Nominated	
2024	Vtuber Awards Indonesia	Vtuber of The Year	Vestia Zeta	Nominated	
2024	NexTone Award	Special	Hoshimachi Suisei	Won	
2025	The Game Awards	Content Creator of the Year	Sakura Miko	Nominated	
2025	The Streamer Awards	Best Content Organization	Hololive	Nominated	
2025	The Streamer Awards	Best VTuber	Mori Calliope	Nominated	
2026	The Streamer Awards	Best VTuber	Gigi Murin	Nominated	
2026	The Streamer Awards	Best VTuber	Koseki Bijou	Nominated	
