= FuwaMoco =

Twin VTubers

- フワモコ
- Fuwawa Abyssgard (left) and Mococo Abyssgard (right) as designed by Icomochi
- Occupations: VTubers; singers

YouTube information
- Channel: FUWAMOCO Ch. hololive
- Years active: 2023–present
- Subscribers: 1.39 million
- Views: 177 million
- Last updated: October 31, 2026

FuwaMoco (Japanese: フワモコ; stylized as FUWAMOCO) are two VTubers and singers affiliated with Hololive Production. The duo consists of twin sisters Fuwawa Abyssgard (フワワ・アビスガード) and Mococo Abyssgard (モココ・アビスガード). They debuted on July 31, 2023, as a part of Hololive English's third generation "Advent". FuwaMoco won VTuber of the Year at the 2024 edition of the VTuber Awards. Their debut album is set to release in February 2027.

== Career ==
FuwaMoco consists of twin sisters Fuwawa Abyssgard, the older twin, and Mococo Abyssgard, the younger twin. They debuted on July 31, 2023, as a part of Hololive English's third generation "Advent", alongside Shiori Novella, Koseki Bijou, and Nerissa Ravencroft. In their lore, FuwaMoco are demonic guard dogs, with Fuwawa being "fluffy" and Mococo being "fuzzy". FuwaMoco's mascot is a dog named Pero, their fans are known as "Ruffians", and their greeting is "bau bau". Their characters were illustrated by Icomochi. FuwaMoco share one YouTube and X (formerly Twitter) account. They usually livestream together, though sometimes only one is present. When streaming together, their speech and reactions often synchronize. They can both speak Japanese and prior to debuting they had formerly lived in Japan. They are also familiar with Japanese internet culture, such as Nico Nico Douga, and otaku culture. They moved to Japan in March 2024. FuwaMoco have many Japanese fans.

FuwaMoco host a morning program, FuwaMoco Morning, (Note: In Japan, it is an evening program, due to time zones.) that is based around announcements and viewer submissions. As of March 2026, it had recorded over 180 episodes. FuwaMoco gained greater attention after participating in a Hololive Grand Theft Auto V event. They reached one million subscribers on YouTube on October 12, 2024. At the 2023 edition of the VTuber Awards, FuwaMoco won in the "League of Their Own" category. At the 2024 edition, FuwaMoco won in the VTuber of the Year category. In March 2026, Fuwawa temporarily went on hiatus to receive a major surgery. During that time, FuwaMoco Morning was suspended and Mococo streamed on her own. In September 2026, Mococo went on hiatus after being diagnosed with an autoimmune disease.

FuwaMoco has released multiple cover songs, including some covers sang only by Fuwawa or Mococo. They also host karaoke livestreams. FuwaMoco released their first original song, "Born to Be "Bau"dol", in July 2024, which was written and composed by PandaBoy. In August 2024, they released an official cover of the Love Is Indivisible by Twins ending theme "Honey Citron". FuwaMoco provided the vocals on the ending theme song of Nekopara After: La Vraie Famille, "Side by Side", which was produced by Aiobahn +81 and Kris Roche. FuwaMoco had previously spoken about how they were fans of the Nekopara series. FuwaMoco are fans of Japanese singer-songwriter and actress Haruko Momoi. To commemorate the release of her CD NewGame+ in October 2025, they held a karaoke livestream singing 19 of her songs. During the livestream, FuwaMoco announced that they had provided backing vocals on Momoi's song "Nanika". The ending theme song of season three of Reborn as a Vending Machine, I Now Wander the Dungeon, "Mekurumeku Rendezvous", is by FuwaMoco. FuwaMoco's debut album is set to release in February 2027.

FuwaMoco held their first online 3D concert in February 2025, to coincide with their characters' birthdays. In 2026, an online 3D variety show was held to again coincide with it, with it featuring an appearance by Kuro-chan of the Yasuda Dai Circus. They have also performed at Hololive and Hololive English concerts.

Pon de Rings

FuwaMoco are fans of the store Mister Donut, having said that the establishment's Pon de Rings are their favorite food. After moving to Japan, they posted a photo of drinks and Pon de Rings at the Akihabara location, which they called their "favorite place in the world". This made the shop a site of pilgrimage for fans, increasing traffic and leading to Pon de Ring shortages. The Akihabara location's closure was announced in October 2024. FuwaMoco expressed sadness at the announcement and livestreamed a memorial service in the hour before it closed. Inside Games asked Mister Donut for comment on the closure after FuwaMoco expressed their sadness, and the business thanked patrons of the location.

In July 2025, Famitsu began syndicating a monthly column on video games written by FuwaMoco. In October 2025, McDonald's Japan posted a tweet featuring "bau bau" and the silhouettes of FuwaMoco, and a music video for a modified version of a Folktales from Japan theme song featuring FuwaMoco, Olympic gymnast Kōhei Uchimura, voice actress Masako Nozawa, and Street Fighter character M. Bison as part of a chicken promotion.

== Reception ==
Shaun Cichacki of Vice found that, despite FuwaMoco being self-declared "demonic guard dogs", he did not find them at all menacing and instead found them "just plain adorable". Masahi Kigazawa of Inside Games found them to behave more like mischievous puppies. Kigazawa also found their performance in the Grand Theft Auto V event, during which VTuber Shirakami Fubuki chased them, to be reminiscent of sketches performed by The Drifters comedy group.

== Discography ==
=== Studio album ===
Title	Details
FuwaMoco à la mode ~forever protecting your smile~ (FUWAMOCO à la mode ～いつだってあなたの笑顔を守るのッ～)	To be released: February 2027; Label: Cover Corp.; Formats: CD, LP, digital download, streaming

=== Singles ===
==== As lead artist ====
Title	Year	Peak chart positions	Album	Notes	Ref.
Title	Year	JPN DL	Album	Notes	Ref.
"Born to be "Bau"dol"	2024	—	FuwaMoco à la mode ~forever protecting your smile~		
"Lifetime Showtime"	2025	89	FuwaMoco à la mode ~forever protecting your smile~		
"Prisoner (FuwaMoco ver.)"	2026	—	Non-album single		
"Mekurumeku Rendezvous" (めくるめくランデヴー)	2026	—	FuwaMoco à la mode ~forever protecting your smile~	Ending theme song of season three of Reborn as a Vending Machine, I Now Wander the Dungeon	
"Ichizutte Trend" (一途ってトレンド♡)	2026	—	FuwaMoco à la mode ~forever protecting your smile~		
"Tri-Unity LoveSystem" (三位一体♡ラブシステム) (with Takane Lui)	2026	—	Non-album single	Written for Hololive Dreams	
"—" denotes releases that did not chart.

==== As featured artist ====
Title	Year	Album	Notes	Ref.
"Side by Side" (Aiobahn +81 featuring FuwaMoco)	2025	eau de parfum ~extended play~	Ending theme song of Nekopara After: La Vraie Famille	

==== As collaborative artist ====
Title	Year	Ref.
"Rebellion" (as Hololive English Advent)	2023	
"Our Bright Parade (English ver.)" (as Hololive English Advent)	2023	
"Sirens" (as Hololive English Advent)	2023	
"Breaking Dimensions" (as Hololive English)	2023	
"Odyssey" (as Hololive English)	2023	
"All For One" (as Hololive English)	2025	
"Genesis" (as Hololive English Advent)	2025	
"Prisoner" (as Hololive English Advent)	2025	
"Bright Tonight" (as Hololive English)	2025	
"Breakout" (as Hololive English Advent)	2026	
"What Goes Around" (as Hololive English Advent)	2026	
"Unchained" (as Hololive English Advent)	2026	
"Serendipity" (as Hololive English)	2026	
"Spotlight" (as Hololive English Advent)	2026	

== Awards ==
Ceremony	Year	Category	Result	Ref.
The VTuber Awards	2023	League of Their Own	Won	
The VTuber Awards	2024	VTuber of the Year	Won	
