= Yukihana Lamy =

Hololive VTuber and singer

- 雪花 ラミィ
- Yukihana Lamy as designed by Rin Yuu
- Occupation: Virtual YouTuber

YouTube information
- Channel: Lamy Ch. 雪花ラミィ
- Years active: 2020–present
- Subscribers: 1.38 million
- Views: 369 million
- Last updated: 9 October 2026

Yukihana Lamy (Japanese: 雪花 ラミィ, Hepburn: Yukihana Ramyi) is a Japanese virtual YouTuber, singer, and brewer affiliated with Cover Corporation's Hololive Production agency. She debuted in August 2020 as part of Hololive's 5th Generation. Her streams include chatting, games, and ASMR, as well as banshaku (晩酌; lit. 'drinking alcohol with dinner') streams where she gets drunk. She has produced several sake varieties with brewery Meiri Shurui, winning two bronzes and a silver at the International Wine Challenge. She has also released several songs, many of which charted in Oricon and Billboard Japan's digital singles charts.

== Overview ==
Yukihana Lamy's lore describes her as a snow elf from "a noble snow family living in the vast, white, icy lands far from civilization"; she joins the Hololive agency after seeing their livestreams. Possessing a vacuous disposition underneath a serious facade, she also has a companion named Daifuku. Her character designer is Rin Yuu.

Yukihana is a member of Hololive 5th Generation alongside Momosuzu Nene, Shishiro Botan, and Omaru Polka. Jin Sugiyama of Real Sound remarked that she is a "vital lubricant" for the 5th Generation's group dynamic, citing her nature as a balancer amongst the junior unit.

Yukihana's fandom name is "Snowfolk" (雪民, Yukimin). Sugiyama wrote that this fandom has splintered into several factions, including the "Business Snowfolk" (ビジネス雪民, Bijinesu Yukimin), "Afterparty Snowfolk" (二次会雪民, Nijikai Yukimin), and even a "Snowfolk Snowfolk" (雪民の雪民, Yukimin no Yukimin).

== Career ==
Yukihana Lamy's debut was announced on 6 August 2020 alongside the rest of Hololive 5th Generation. Her first stream premiered on YouTube on 12 August, with her audience reaching 100,000.

=== Streamer career ===
Yukihana's streams include chatting, games, ASMR, and drinking. Sugiyama wrote that her conversational skills are a "key charm" of hers, relying on a natural tone and perfectly timed pausing instead of a kishōtenketsu style. Among video games she has streamed include Animal Tower Battle, Elden Ring, Minecraft, and Mongil: Star Dive.

in September 2022, Sunshine Aquarium held an event commemorating Yukihana's one-million subscriber milestone. In August 2023, she went on a hiatus after contracting COVID-19; her Live2D 3.0 model debut was delayed, and her appearance on the Hololive radio show Sukodawa was cancelled. She took another health hiatus in December 2023, saying that she had an illness of indeterminate origin.

One type of stream Yukihana often does is banshaku (晩酌; lit. 'drinking alcohol with dinner'); inspired by a hobby of hers, she appears drunk and talks about the alcoholic drink and snacks she had on the night of the stream. In July 2025, she premiered her first banshaku stream through the VRChat platform, with thirty spots reserved for viewers on a first-come-first-serve basis.

In January 2026, Yukihana said that she had a mammogram, humorously calling the chat creepy for asking for the images from the mammogram. Other streams she has hosted include a fitness championship-like stream for Hololive talents, a ten-part workout training video series, and an azatoi (あざとい; lit. 'coquettish') championship stream, Kizuna AI considers Yukihana a favorite of hers, even sending her a Super Chat at one point.

=== Sake brewing ===
In 2021, Yukihana began collaborating with sake brewery Meiri Shurui for the "Lamy's Sake-Making Project" (ラミィの日本酒づくりプロジェクト, Ramyi no Nihonshu-dzukuri Purojekuto), where she consults them on aspects like yeast content and rice variety, and at one point personally helped brew the sake at their brewery in Mito, Ibaraki. They created a daiginjo sake Yuki-Yo-Zuki (雪夜月, Yukiyodzuki) in a stream, and entered it into the International Wine Challenge 2022, winning the bronze medal in the sake category. Yuki-Yo-Zuki became popular, with a second production round selling out.

In April 2023, they released another sake variety, a junmai daiginjo named Yukihana Favorite Model, which won bronze at that year's IWC. They later returned a third time to the IWC in 2025, where their Bihappou Yuki-Yo-Zuki (微発泡 雪夜月) won silver in the Sparking category.

=== Singing career ===
In November 2021, Yukihana unveiled her solo song "Asu e no Kyokaisen", produced by Yohei Kisara, at her 3D birthday concert; Sugiyama said that it "convey[ed] her heartfelt determination to become an idol within Hololive". It charted at #31 on the Billboard Japan Top Download Songs and #40 on the Oricon Digital Singles Chart, and she later released several singles charting at the former. She and Aglio, Olio e Peperoncino performed "Bravely Dance", the opening theme for the 2025 Bogus Skill "Fruitmaster" anime adaptation. In January 2025, she provided the theme song for Syabu-Yo's Rich Clam Chowder Broth & Cheese Fair. Unlike most members of Hololive, she does not host her own karaoke streams.

In August 2026, it was announced that Yukihana's first album, Fleur de Neige, would be released on 27 January 2027. Two weeks after the announcement, she said on a livestream that the album had reached a planned sales target.

== Discography ==
=== Albums ===
Title	Album details
Fleur de Neige	To be released: 27 January 2027; Label: Cover Corp

=== Singles ===
==== As lead artist ====
Title	Year	Peak chart positions		Album
Title	Year	JPN Dig.	JPN DL	Album
"Asu e no Kyokaisen" (明日への境界線)	2021	40	31	Fleur de Neige
"Fleur"	2022	—	25	Fleur de Neige
"Lamy Love Fest" (stylized as "Lamy*Love?Fest☆")	2023	—	51	TBA
"Hatsukoi Pâtissière" (ハツコイ♡パティシエール)	2024	—	89	TBA
"Watashi wo Amayakasunara" (わたしを甘やかすなら)	2024	—	67	TBA
"Lamy's Baribari Workout" (ラミィズバリバリワークアウト)	2024	—	—	TBA
"Yoppara Music!" (よっぱらみゅ～じっく！)	2025	—	—	TBA
"Muteki Honki da Survivor!" (無敵☆本気だサバイバー！)	2025	—	—	Fleur de Neige
"Snowlight Stories"	2026	—	—	TBA
"Braver"	2026	—	—	TBA

==== As hololive 5th Generation (NePoLaBo) ====
Title	Year	Peak chart positions
Title	Year	JPN Dig.
"Twinkle 4 You"	2023	29
"Cosmic Wonderful Tour!"	2023	—
"Hyper Jumpin'"	2023	—
"Hitotsuninarukoe" (ひとつになる声)	2025	81
"Cosmic Wonderful Tour! -Christmas Remix-"	2025	—
"#Melozoma" (＃めろぞーま)	2026	—
"Watcha Gatcha!!!!!!!!" (with Secret Society holoX)	2026	—
