= Shishiro Botan =

Hololive VTuber and singer

- 獅白 ぼたん
- Shishiro Botan as designed by Tomari
- Occupations: Virtual YouTuber; singer; tournament host

YouTube information
- Channel: Botan Ch.獅白ぼたん
- Years active: 2020–present
- Subscribers: 1.59 million
- Views: 337.895 million
- Last updated: 11 October 2026

Shishiro Botan (Japanese: 獅白 ぼたん, Hepburn: Shishiro Botan) is a Japanese virtual YouTuber, singer, and tournament host, affiliated with Cover Corporation's Hololive Production agency. She debuted in August 2020 as part of Hololive's 5th Generation. She streams several game genres such as fighting games and first-person shooters, receiving two nominations at The Vtuber Awards for Best FPS Vtuber, and is a host of Street Fighter 6 tournament Shishiro Hai. She is also known for her love of ramen, having started a culinary tourism series on the dish, featured her own recipe on many of her streams, and broken a Guinness World Record with ramen packages.

== Overview ==
Shishiro's lore describes her as a lazy white lioness who is a video game addict. Her character designer is Tomari.

Shishiro is a member of Hololive 5th Generation alongside Yukihana Lamy, Momosuzu Nene, and Omaru Polka. Her fandom name is the SSRB.

== Career ==
Shishiro made her debut as part of Hololive 5th Generation on 6 August 2020, with her first livestream on 14 August 2020. By 2021, Shishiro had amassed a following in the Russophone world; Sura, who wrote a Note post about Russian-language VTubers, attributed that popularity to her frequent usage of the Russian language.

Shishiro streams numerous game genres, such as fighting games, first-person shooters, and horror games; she is also known for her reputation as an avid player in FPS. She was twice nominated at The Vtuber Awards for Best FPS Vtuber in 2023 and 2024, losing to Selen Tatsuki and Dokibird, respectively. Other stream types she has posted include culinary tourism. In a March 2023 Animate Times article, several fans praised her for her gaming skills, laughter, "big sister" and "little sister" vibes, and gap moe.

Since March 2024, Shishiro has hosted Shishiro Hai (獅白杯; lt. "Shishiro Cup"), a Street Fighter 6 tournament frequented by streamers regardless of professional status or avatar type. In January 2025, she won the VTuber Award in the Live Entertainment category at the Japan eSports Awards 2024. In April 2026, she hosted Shishiro-hai's first offline edition for two days at Yokohama Cultural Gymnasium.

In June 2021, Shishiro was appointed a virtual ambassador for Red Bull. In September 2024, Topre showed a collaboration model of its Realforce keyboard at Tokyo Game Show 2024. She was a guest on the Meta Taxi web series.

=== Singing career ===
In August 2021, Shishiro released her first original song "Lioness' Pride", commemorating her first anniversary. An EDM song produced by Camellia, it charted at #40 on the Billboard Japan Top Download Songs Kō Kusano of Kai-You said that the song highlights qualities that transcend her "laid-back white lion" nature. In March 2022, she released a cover of VTuber Lucas' song Souzou.

Two more of Shishiro's songs charted on that same chart: "I I I Love You" and "Connect:Addict". In November 2024, she released Lights, an album featuring three of her original songs; it topped at #23 at the Oricon Digital Albums Chart and #30 at the Billboard Japan Download Albums.

=== Ramen ===
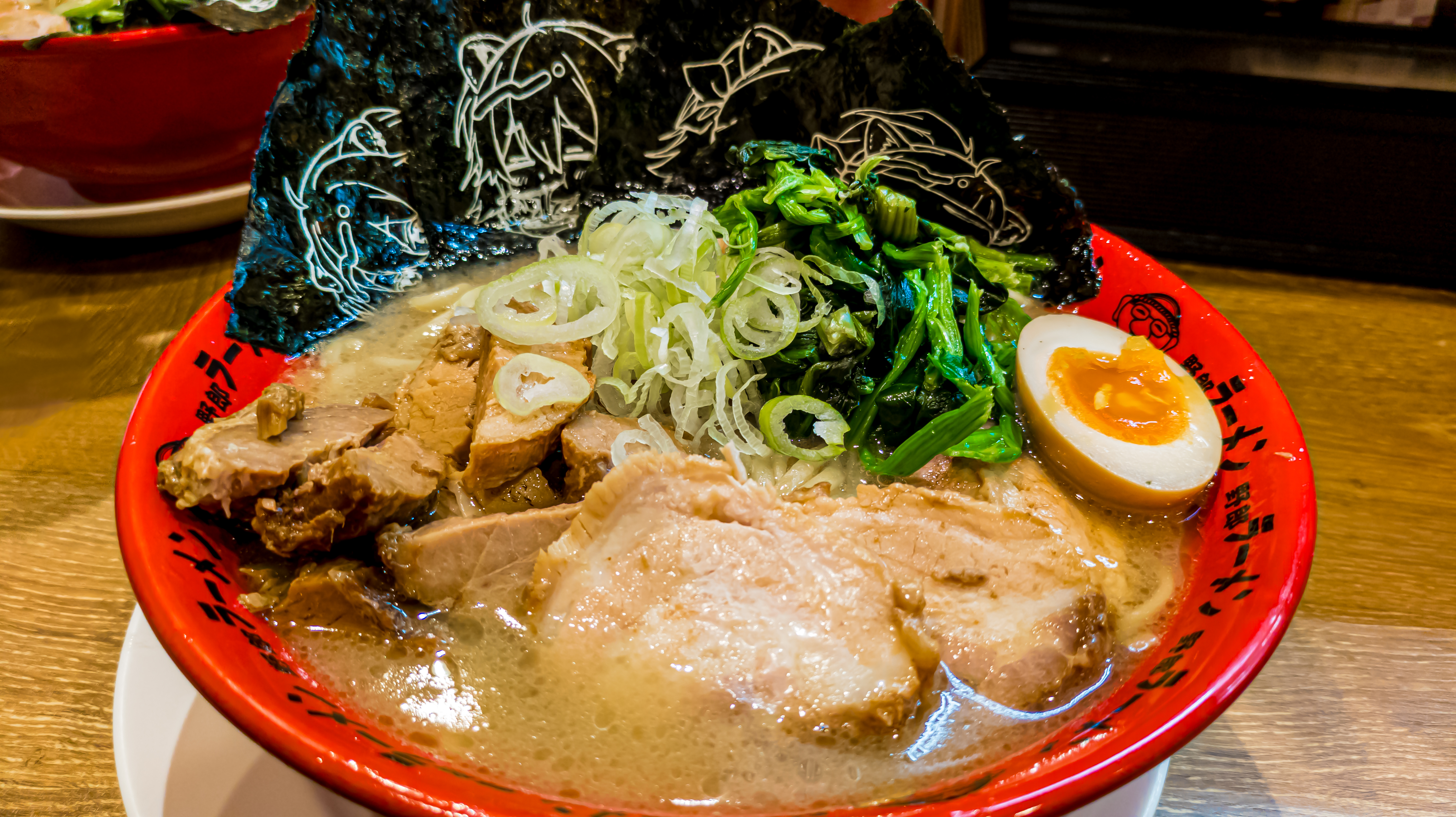
A bowl of Menya Botan at Yaro Ramen, with nori seaweed depicting Shishiro

Shishiro is known for her love for ramen, which she serves as a regular aspect of her streams. She served her Menya Botan (麵屋ぼたん, Men'ya Botan) recipe at her 2021 birthday stream. In February 2024, she started touring every prefecture in a "ramen tour". The tour's first season ended in November 2025, with a second season premiering in December 2025.

On 31 August 2024, Shishiro broke the Guinness World Record for "Largest packaged food sentence" at her birthday celebration at Sunshine City, Tokyo, arranging 33,138 Cup Noodles to form her English name with the help of Hololive fans. She also conceived Menya Botan, a tonkotsu ramen dish sold at four Yaro Ramen restaurants from November to December 2024; she also designed the dish's noodles herself. In January 2026, she released a video with YouTuber Hikakin, where they swap each other's personal ramen brands, namely Menya Botan and Hikakin's Misokin.

== Discography ==
=== Extended plays ===
Title	Album details	Peak chart positions	
Title	Album details	JPN Dg.	JPN DL
Lights	Released: 5 November 2024; Label: Cover Corp	23	30
"—" denotes releases that did not chart or were not released in that region.

=== Singles ===
==== As lead artist ====
Title	Year	Peak chart positions		Album
Title	Year	JPN Dig.	JPN DL	Album
"Lioness' Pride"	2021	—	40	Lights
"I I I Love You"	2022	48	44	Lights
"Connect: Addict" (stylized as Connect:Addict)	2023	—	42	Lights
"REMIX: Lioness Pride / I I I Love You" (stylized as REMIX-LionessPrideIIILoveYou)	2023	—	—	Non-album singles
"Simulacre" (シミュラクル)	2025	—	—	Non-album singles
"Gaotteko!" (がおってこ！)	2025	—	—	Non-album singles
"Connect: Addict (Remix ver.)" (stylized as Connect:Addict (Remix ver.))	2025	—	—	Non-album singles
"Hikari (Remix ver.)"	2025	—	—	Non-album singles
"Boundary" (stylized in low-caps)	2025	—	—	Non-album singles
"Tokihanate" (トキハナテ)	2026	—	—	Non-album singles
"Stray & Stay"	2026	—	—	Non-album singles
"Amaryllis"	2026	—	—	Non-album singles

==== As hololive 5th Generation (NePoLaBo) ====
Title	Year	Peak chart positions
Title	Year	JPN Dig.
"Twinkle 4 You"	2023	29
"Cosmic Wonderful Tour!"	2023	—
"Hyper Jumpin'"	2023	—
"Hitotsuninarukoe" (ひとつになる声)	2025	81
"Cosmic Wonderful Tour! -Christmas Remix-"	2025	—
"#Melozoma" (＃めろぞーま)	2026	—
"Watcha Gatcha!!!!!!!!" (with Secret Society holoX)	2026	—

== Awards and nominations ==
Ceremony	Year	Category	Result	Ref.
The Vtuber Awards	2023	Best FPS VTuber	Nominated	
The Vtuber Awards	2024	Best FPS VTuber	Nominated	
