= Ookami Mio =

Japanese VTuber and singer

- 大神ミオ
- Ookami Mio as designed by Izumi Sai
- Occupations: VTuber; singer

YouTube information
- Channel: Mio Channel 大神ミオ
- Years active: 2018-present
- Subscribers: 1.36 million
- Views: 366 million
- Last updated: 28 October 2026

Ookami Mio (Japanese: 大神ミオ, Hepburn: Ōkami Mio) is a Japanese VTuber and singer affiliated with Cover Corporation's Hololive Production agency. She debuted as part of Hololive Gamers in December 2018. Her streams include gaming and tarot reading. She has also released two albums, Night Walk (2023) and My Sparkle (2025), the latter of which topped the Oricon Albums Chart and Oricon Combined Albums Chart.

== Overview ==
Ookami Mio's design is a kemonomimi wolf girl that often shows up around shrines. Her birthday is 20 August. Her character designer is Izumi Sai.

Ookami is a member of Hololive Gamers, which also includes Shirakami Fubuki, Nekomata Okayu and Inugami Korone. She is the first new member of the unit to debut, after Shirakami Fubuki who already debuted as a 1st generation member. Her fandom name is called Mio-fam (ミオファ) which is short for Mio Family.

Other than Hololive Gamers, Ookami is also a member of several subgroups such as AyaFubuMi (いろはにほへっと あやふぶみ, Irohanihohetto Ayafubumi; with Shirakami Fubuki and Nakiri Ayame), FAMS (with Shirakami Fubuki, Nakiri Ayame and Oozora Subaru), and RosaMiA (with AZKi and Aki Rosenthal).

== Career ==
Ookami Mio's debut was announced on 6 December 2018, a part of the newly-formed subgroup Hololive Gamers, being one of the only two member of the group at the time (the other one being 1st Generation member Shirakami Fubuki). A day later, she held her debut stream. On 16 June 2019, Ookami debuted her 3D model. In June 2022, Ookami's channel reached one million subscribers. Jenni Lada of Siliconera called Ookami "one of the more established members of [Hololive]".

=== Streaming career ===
As part of Hololive Gamers, Ookami's streams focus on gaming; Takubou of Dengeki Online cites her habit of reading in-game text and "relaxed commentary" as standout points about her. Games she has streamed include Bow-wow Battle, Persona 3 Reload, Pocket Card Jockey, and We Were Here.

Every Monday morning, Ookami holds AsaMio (朝ミオ), a recurring stream where she provides personal updates and interacts with fans. In addition, Ookami also holds tarot reading streams, including a six-part series where she was taught by professional fortune-teller R.I.O.N., as well as ASMR and cooking streams.

On 30 July 2020, Capcom sent Ookami copyright strikes for her gameplay streams of Ghost Trick, prompting Cover Corporation to take down all Hololive talents' gameplay videos that had been streamed without securing permission from copyright holders. Cover, who had recently apologized for streaming Nintendo games without permission, again apologized for their mismanagement leading to the copyright infringement and the mass deletion of videos, and promised to only stream games that they had received permissions for. Ookami's activities were put on hold as a result of this incident.

Ookami's lore includes an origin from Mount Akagi in Gunma Prefecture. In November 2023, the Gunma governor Ichita Yamamoto announced a collaboration with Ookami at a regular press conference. The collaboration consists of a series of promotional videos about the prefecture, including one of her meeting the governor and the prefectural mascot Gunma-chan. The Mainichi Shimbun noted the exceptional view numbers for the press conference and the promotional videos featuring Ookami, showcasing the popularity of VTubers.

In April 2024, Ookami announced that she would take a health hiatus. The next month, Cover announced that Ookami was hospitalized and therefore her appearances at Hololive Gamers Fes and Music Verse Fes. would be cancelled. On 30 June, Ookami returned from her hiatus, revealing that she had suffered from acute pancreatitis.

=== Music career ===
In addition to her streams, Ookami is also known as a singer. In August 2021, Ookami released her first original song "Howling", which charted #21 on the Billboard Japan Top Download Songs. In 2023, she released her first album Night Walk, featuring music from artists like Deco*27, Shota Horie, and Minako Kawae, as well as a song she co-wrote and co-composed.

In August 2025, Ookami released her second album, My Sparkle, which featured music from Bocchi Boromaru, Nagi Yanagi, Teniwoha, and Zaq. The album's theme is travel, with Ookami citing her enthusiasm with traveling as an inspiration. My Sparkle debuted at #1 in the Oricon Albums Chart and later reached #1 at the Oricon Combined Albums Chart. On 10 September 2025, Ookami held her first solo concert Our Sparkle at the Pia Arena MM, which featured guest appearances from Shirakami Fubuki, Sakura Miko and Oozora Subaru. In the same year, Ookami peaked at #67 on the Billboard Japan Artist 100.

Ookami also participates in Hololive's music group projects. She has released songs as part of AyaFubuMi and RosaMiA, as well as Hololive Idol Project. In February 2027, she is set to perform at the Hyakka Ryouran Ayafubumi live concert as part of AyaFubuMi at the Ariake Arena.

== Discography ==
=== Albums ===
==== As lead artist ====
Title	Details	Peak chart positions					
Title	Details	JPN	JPN Comb.	JPN Dg.	JPN Hot	JPN Top	JPN DL
Night Walk	Released: 7 December 2023; Label: Cover Corp	—	—	4	23	50	5
My Sparkle	Released: 20 August 2025; Label: Cover Corp	1	1	7	33	1	7
"—" denotes releases that did not chart or were not released in that region.

=== Extended plays ===
==== As collaborative artist ====
Title	Details	Peak chart positions		
Title	Details	JPN Dg.	JPN Hot	JPN DL
Yamato Phantasia (ヤマトファンタジア) (with Nakiri Ayame, Shirakami Fubuki, and Sakura Miko)	Released: 16 July 2023; Label: Cover Corp; Formats: Digital download, streaming	6	—	32
Sleepless Songbook (可惜夜歌集, Atarayo Kashū) (with Nakiri Ayame and Shirakami Fubuki as AyaFubuMi)	Released: 27 July 2023; Label: FAVES; Formats: CD, digital download, streaming	17	54	13
"—" denotes releases that did not chart or were not released in that region.

=== Singles ===
==== As lead artist ====
Title	Year	Peak chart positions		Album
Title	Year	JPN Dig.	JPN DL	Album
"Howling"	2021	—	21	Non-album singles
"Sashimio" (さしみお) (stylized in all-caps; featuring Oozora Subaru and Nekomata Okayu as SubaOka)	2021	—	96	Non-album singles
"Sayonara wa Mada" (サヨナラは、まだ)	2022	—	94	Night Walk
"Yakou Tsuushinn" (夜光通信)	2022	—	88	Night Walk
"Dawn Mellow" (夜明けのメロウ)	2023	—	81	Night Walk
"Camellia" (カメリア)	2023	—	—	Night Walk
"Shoushin Ryokou" (小心旅行)	2024	—	—	My Sparkle
"Colorful Universe"	2025	—	92	My Sparkle
"Dandelion" (たんぽぽ)	2025	—	—	My Sparkle
"Natsuyadori" (夏宿り)	2025	—	—	My Sparkle
"Eeny Meeny Maigo" (イニミニまいご)	2025	—	—	Non-album singles
"Noroshi" (狼煙) (stylized in all-caps)	2025	38	51	Non-album singles
"—" denotes releases that did not chart or were not released in that region.

==== As AyaFubuMi ====
Title	Year	Peak chart positions		Album
Title	Year	JPN Dig.	JPN DL	Album
"Onikemodance" (おにけもだんす) (stylized in all caps)	2022	—	27	Sleepless Songbook
"Hozukibiyori" (鬼灯日和)	2022	34	17	Sleepless Songbook
"Renjo Shiika" (恋情詩歌)	2022	—	27	Sleepless Songbook
"OniOniKonKonWaon" (おにおにこんこんわおん)	2024	—	—	Non-album singles
"Ame Tokimeki Koimoyo" (雨トキメキ恋模様)	2025	—	—	Non-album singles
"Irowanioedomo" (色は匂えども)	2026	—	—	Non-album singles
"Gokuraku Gokigen Enbiyori" (極楽ごきげん縁日和)	2026	—	—	Non-album singles
"—" denotes releases that did not chart or were not released in that region.

==== As Hololive Gamers ====
Title	Year	Peak chart positions
Title	Year	JPN Dig.
"We are Gamers!!!!"	2024	40
"To Be Continued...."	2025	40
