= Usada Pekora =

Hololive Japanese VTuber

- 兎田ぺこら
- Usada Pekora as designed by Yuuki Hagure
- Born: 12 January
- Occupation: Virtual YouTuber

YouTube information
- Channel: Pekora Ch. 兎田ぺこら
- Years active: 2019–present
- Genres: Livestreaming; Singing; Gaming
- Subscribers: 2.79 million
- Views: 1.16 billion
- Last updated: 15 August 2026
- Website: hololive.hololivepro.com/en/talents/usada-pekora//

Usada Pekora (Japanese: 兎田ぺこら) is a Japanese virtual YouTuber affiliated with Hololive Production. She is part of Hololive Japan's 3rd Generation, "hololive Fantasy." In addition to being one of the most-watched members of Hololive, she is one of the most-watched female streamers.

== Overview ==
Usada Pekora is one of the five original members of "hololive Fantasy", Hololive's 3rd generation of streamers, alongside Uruha Rushia, Houshou Marine, Shiranui Flare, and Shirogane Noel. Her Live2D model, featuring rabbit ears, blue hair, and carrot hair ornaments, was designed and illustrated by Yuuki Hagure and rigged by rariemonn. In a 2020 interview, she stated that she was inspired to join Hololive by idol Momoko Tsugunaga of Berryz Kobo.

== Activity ==
Pekora's debut stream took place on 17 July 2019. Writing for Fortune, Nicholas Gordon described her as best known for streaming Japanese role-playing games and Minecraft prank content. On 13 December 2020, in celebration of reaching 1,000,000 YouTube subscribers, she streamed herself revealing her job as a virtual YouTuber to her mother.

In May 2022, she went on hiatus due to voice-related health concerns. She returned in June 2022.

In the 2022 video game Dragon Quest Treasures, there is a monster named Pekotte that is voiced by and based on her.

For the year of 2023, Pekora launched her promotional theme, the Human Rabbitality Project. Nicknamed the Rabbit Plan, this was to coincide with the Year of the Rabbit. The project began with an announcement stream followed by her single, "Zenjinrui Usagika Keikaku!". The project included a number of products and marketing collaborations, notably with Milky and Bandai. A life size figure of Pekora was even produced. The project was topped off with her first solo live concert: 1st Usada PekoLive -USAGI the MEGAMI!!- in the Ariake Arena.

On 11 August 2023, she was added as a playable character in the Hololive fangame Idol Showdown.

According to streaming data analysis site Stream Charts, Pekora was the most watched female streamer of 2023 by watch hours.

In May 2025, she was an announced as a cameo in the video game Death Stranding 2: On the Beach, and was added as an NPC prepper. Completing her sidequests awards the player a hat modeled after her viewer mascot, the Nousagi (野うさぎ, wild rabbit), which greatly boosts stamina and causes the main character Sam, portrayed by Norman Reedus, to end his sentences with the same "-peko" verbal tic Pekora uses. Pekora's appearance in the game came about due to director Hideo Kojima's personal interest in her streams.

== Discography ==
=== Studio albums ===
Title	Album details	Peak chart position		Sales
Title	Album details	JPN Dig.	JPN Hot	Sales
Usagi the Megami!! (うさぎ the Megami!!)	Released: 27 November 2023; Label: Cover Corp.; Formats: CD, digital download, streaming	9	26	JPN: 1,171 (digital)

=== Extended plays ===
Title	EP details	Peak chart positions			Sales
Title	EP details	JPN	JPN Comb.	JPN DL	Sales
#OperationHeartfulCuties ~You’ve Got No Choice but to Love the Strongest Idols~ (#きゅるるん大作戦 〜最強アイドル、推すしかないでしょ〜) (with Shiranui Flare, Shirogane Noel, and Houshou Marine as Hololive 3rd Generation)	Released: 9 January 2026; Label: Hololive Records; Formats: CD, digital download, streaming	3	7	10	JPN: 6,716

=== Singles ===
==== As lead artist ====
Title	Year	Peak chart positions		Albums
Title	Year	JPN Dig.	JPN DL	Albums
"Pekorandombrain!" (ぺこらんだむぶれいん!)	2021	49	44	Usagi the Megami!!
"Alibi Bunny" (いいわけバニー)	2022	32	31	Usagi the Megami!!
"RaRaRa Rabbit!!" (ララララビット！！)	2022	30	22	Usagi the Megami!!
"Zenjinrui Usagika Keikaku!" (全人類 兎化計画！)	2023	—	88	Usagi the Megami!!
"Saikyo Megami†Usa Pekora" (最強女神†ウーサペコラ)	2023	—	56	Usagi the Megami!!
"Peko Peko!! Chicken Fever☆" (ぺこぺこ!! チキンフィーバー☆)	2025	—	—	Non-album single
"Love Scab" (ラブノカサブタ)	2026	—	—	Non-album single
"—" denotes releases that did not chart.

==== As collaborative artist ====
Title	Year	Peak chart positions		Albums
Title	Year	JPN Dig.	JPN DL	Albums
"Pekomiko Daisenso!!" (ぺこみこ大戦争！！) (with Sakura Miko)	2020	—	34	Non-album singles
"Hacha-Mecha Miracle" (Hacha-Mecha ミラクル) (with Minato Aqua and Oozora Subaru)	2020	—	—	Non-album singles
"Interact Fantasia" (いんたらくとふぁんたじあ) (with Uruha Rushia, Shiranui Flare, Shirogane Noel and Houshou Marine as Hololive Fantasy)	2021	—	—	Non-album singles
"Mosh Race" (モッシュレース) (with Sakura Miko)	2023	26	31	Holo*27 Originals Vol. 1
"Dodekambitious" (with Oozora Subaru, Sakura Miko and Nekomata Okayu)	2023	—	—	Non-album singles
"Bridal Dream" (ブライダルドリーム) (with Houshou Marine)	2023	—	63	Holohoneygaoka High School -Originals-
"Hide & Seek 〜Nakayoku Kenkashina〜" (Hide & Seek 〜なかよくケンカしな！〜) (with Hakos Baelz)	2024	—	—	Zodiac
"Reality Fantasy" (with Shiranui Flare, Shirogane Noel and Houshou Marine as Hololive Fantasy)	2024	—	—	#OperationHeartfulCuties ~You’ve Got No Choice but to Love the Strongest Idols~
"Yokubari Denno Girl" (よくばり電脳ガール) (with Shiranui Flare, Shirogane Noel and Houshou Marine as Hololive 3rd Generation)	2025	—	—	#OperationHeartfulCuties ~You’ve Got No Choice but to Love the Strongest Idols~
"kyuru☆cheer" (きゅる☆ちあ) (with Shiranui Flare, Shirogane Noel and Houshou Marine as Hololive 3rd Generation)	2025	—	—	#OperationHeartfulCuties ~You’ve Got No Choice but to Love the Strongest Idols~
"Ai Ai Ai Ai♡Ai Love You" (あいあいあいあい♡あいらぶゆー) (with Shiranui Flare, Shirogane Noel and Houshou Marine as Hololive 3rd Generation)	2026	—	—	#OperationHeartfulCuties ~You’ve Got No Choice but to Love the Strongest Idols~
"—" denotes releases that did not chart.

== Awards and nominations ==
Year	Ceremony	Category	Result	Ref.
2023	The Vtuber Awards	VTuber of the Year	Nominated	
2024	The Game Awards	Content Creator of the Year	Nominated	
