= Tsunomaki Watame =

Japanese VTuber and singer

- 角巻 わため
- Tsunomaki Watame as designed by fuumi
- Occupations: VTuber; singer

YouTube information
- Channel: Watame Ch. 角巻わため
- Years active: 2019-present
- Subscribers: 1.73 million
- Views: 743 million
- Last updated: 26 October 2026

Tsunomaki Watame (Japanese: 角巻 わため, Hepburn: Tsunomaki Watame) is a Japanese VTuber and singer affiliated with Cover Corporation's Hololive Production agency. She debuted in December 2019 as part of Hololive's 4th Generation. She is known for her singing content, and her streams also include chatting and gaming. She has also released several albums and singles, including Hop Step Sheep (2024) and "Respawn!!" (2026).

== Overview ==
Tsunomaki's lore describes her as a sheep bard who loves singing. Her character designer is fuumi. Her birthday is 6 June.

Tsunomaki is a member of Hololive's 4th Generation, alongside Tokoyami Towa, Himemori Luna, Amane Kanata and Kiryu Coco. Her fandom name is called the Watamates (わためいと).

== Career ==
Tsunomaki Watame's debut was announced on 25 December 2019 alongside the rest of Hololive 4th Generation, with her debut stream on 29 December. On 12 July 2020, Tsunomaki held her first 3D stream, which reached more than 100,000 concurrent viewers. On 19 July 2021, Tsunomaki's channel reached 1 million subscribers.

=== Streaming career ===
Tsunomaki's streams include singing, gaming and chatting. She hosts a weekly singing stream named Watameh Night Fever!!, which had aired 110 episodes by 2024. In 2020, she debuted Watame no Uta, where she would broadcast a short music cover every weekday morning. She also streams a collaboration series named Tsunomaki Watame's Have A Nice Day.

Tsunomaki plays a wide range of games during her streams, including Minecraft. She also holds chat streams where she responds to Super Chats from previous streams and holds casual chats with the audience. In 2026, she hosted the Holo Mascot Battle, a variety show for the Hololive VTubers' 3D mascots.

=== Music career ===
In December 2020, Tsunomaki released her first original song "Aimai Chocolate" which was first revealed during her first 3D stream. She later released two albums, Watame no Uta: Vol.1 and Watame no Uta: Vol.2. (both 2021), and her first solo concert, Watame Night Fever!! in Zepp Tokyo was held on 12 October 2021. In December 2022, she released her first extended play, Watame no Uta: Vol.2.5.

In January 2024, Tsunomaki released her third album Hop Step Sheep, featuring music from Hidefumi Kenmochi and Porno Graffitti, and held a second solo concert, Watame Night Fever!! in Tokyo Garden Theatre. In June 2024, she and Sound Voltex: Exceed Gear launched a collaboration where some of her songs were featured on the game. In December 2024, she released her second EP, What A Mess!!!. In 2026, she performed "Respawn!!", the opening song for the first season of the Nia Liston: The Merciless Maiden anime.

In 2024, Tsunomaki peaked at #90 on the Billboard Japan Artist 100. Niji Kusano noted that she is "capable of mastering a diverse range of genres—from nursery rhymes and hip-hop to rock, electronic, and denpa songs". Tamagomago wrote that her appeal "lies in her ability to embody both a pop-star charm and a cool, edgy vibe". Tsunomaki has stated her dream is to perform at the Nippon Budokan one day.

Tsunomaki has written the lyrics for some of her songs, including "Dreaming Sheep" and "Revival".

== Personal life ==
Tsunomaki Watame comes from Kyoto. She is a fan of manga artists Mayumi Azuma, Karuho Shiina, and Arina Tanemura.

== Discography ==
=== Albums ===
Title	Album details	Peak chart positions					
Title	Album details	JPN	JPN Comb.	JPN Dg.	JPN Hot	JPN Top	JPN DL
Watame no Uta: Vol.1 (stylized as WATAME NO UTA vol.1)	Released: 31 May 2021; Label: Cover Corp	—	—	4	13	—	3
Watame no Uta: Vol.2 (stylized as WATAME NO UTA vol.2)	Released: 30 December 2021; Label: Cover Corp	—	—	5	25	—	5
Hop Step Sheep	Released: 10 January 2024; Label: Cover Corp	8	12	6	11	11	9

=== Extended plays ===
Title	Album details	Peak chart positions		
Title	Album details	JPN Dg.	JPN Top	JPN DL
Watame no Uta: Vol.2.5 (stylized as WATAME NO UTA vol.2.5)	Released: 30 December 2022; Label: Cover Corp	23	—	47
What a Mess!!! (stylized in all-caps)	Released: 30 December 2024; Label: Cover Corp	5	23	—

=== Singles ===
Title	Year	Peak chart positions		Album
Title	Year	JPN Dig.	JPN DL	Album
"Aimai Chocolate" (愛昧ショコラーテ) (stylized in low-caps)	2020	—	31	Watame no Uta: Vol.1
"Melody For You" (キミだけのメロディ)	2021	—	52	Watame no Uta: Vol.2
"Mayday, Mayday" (stylized as "mayday,mayday")	2021	—	40	Watame no Uta: Vol.2
"Everlasting Soul"	2021	—	51	Watame no Uta: Vol.2
"Kimiiro Hanamizuki" (君色ハナミズキ)	2022	—	52	Watame no Uta: Vol.2.5 and Hop Step Sheep
"Dreamy Sheep" (夢見る羊) (stylized as "Dreamy sheep")	2022	—	46	Watame no Uta: Vol.2.5 and Hop Step Sheep
"Fins"	2023	19	18	Hop Step Sheep
"What an Amazing Swing" (stylized as "What an amazing swing")	2023	48	57	Hop Step Sheep
"Now on Step" (stylized as "Now on step")	2023	—	73	Hop Step Sheep
"Revival"	2024	42	47	What a Mess!!!
"Biri" (ビリ) (stylized in all-caps)	2025	43	53	TBA
"Riddles We Share" (ぼくらのなぞなぞ)	2025	—	98	TBA
"Haiiro no Shoumei" (灰色の証明)	2026	—	99	TBA
"Respawn!!" (リスポーン!!)	2026	11	15	TBA
