= Nekomata Okayu =

Japanese VTuber

- 猫又おかゆ
- Nekomata Okayu as designed by Kamioka Chiroru
- Occupation: VTuber

YouTube information
- Channel: Okayu Ch. 猫又おかゆ
- Years active: 2019–present
- Subscribers: 2.13 million
- Views: 752 million
- Last updated: August 7, 2026
- Website: hololive.hololivepro.com/en/talents/nekomata-okayu/

Nekomata Okayu (Japanese: 猫又おかゆ) is a Japanese VTuber affiliated with Hololive Production. She debuted as a part of Hololive Gamers on April 6, 2019.

== Career ==
Nekomata debuted as a VTuber with Hololive Production's group Hololive Gamers on April 6, 2019. She was Gamers's third member, after Shirakami Fubuki and Ookami Mio, who had both urged Nekomata to interview for the company. She received a job offer the same day she interviewed with the then-small company's president Motoaki Tanigo. After joining the company, Nekomata made a job recommendation for her friend, and as a result Inugami Korone debuted in Hololive Gamers shortly after her. Nekomata is close friends with Inugami and they are referred to together as "OkaKoro". She is also close with Oozora Subaru from Hololive's 2nd generation, who credits Nekomata for showing her how to have fun playing video games.

Nekomata's character, illustrated by Kamioka Chiroru, has purple hair and is cat-themed. Nekomata's character's birthday is February 22, National Cat Day in Japan. Around the time of her debut, Nekomata had a tomboyish character with her bob cut and the traditionally masculine pronoun boku that she refers to herself with, but over time, she became known for her openness towards sexual topics and double entendres; she personally credits this change in character to Hololive being a "women's paradise".

Nekomata is also known for her ASMR content. After a few months of streaming and to celebrate reaching 40,000 subscribers on YouTube. Before 2021, she streamed ASMR irregularly every few months, and after 2021 the frequency greatly increased. Compared to other members of Hololive who do ASMR, her voice is lower and softer. Many viewers find Nekomata's voice pleasant and consider her good at doing ASMR. She is present in multiple of Hololive's voice packs, and, as of 2024, she streamed situational ASMR in YouTube member streams.

In July 2019, Nekomata began collaborating with Nijisanji-affiliated VTuber Shiina Yuika, whose character was also illustrated by Kamioka, in a casual conversation format. They have frequently collaborated, which gained attention from other VTubers and viewers because it is rare for Nijisanji and Hololive VTubers to collaborate frequently. On April 17, 2021, Nekomata reached one million subscribers on YouTube. In 2023, according to livestreaming analytics website Streams Charts, Nekomata's average viewership of 10,500 was tenth-highest among VTubers. In October 2024, Nekomata was a speaker at a Meta Quest event for the video game Triangle Strategy.

=== Music ===
In an interview, Nekomata said that since she was young she has liked Vocaloid songs and Ringo Sheena. Nekomata released her first song, the synth-pop "Mogu Mogu YUMMY!", on February 23, 2021. On September 6, 2022, she released her debut album, Poisonya Syndrome. On September 30, Nekomata performed her first solo concert at Tachikawa Stage Garden, with Inugami having a guest appearance. In February 2024, three of Nekomata's songs were permanently added to the rhythm game Sound Vortex Exceed Gear. Nekomata released the single "Neko Kaburi-Na" on February 22, 2024, after performing it in a birthday concert, with a music video made by people experienced in the anime industry. She was also part of the Hololive music group Blue Journey. She has performed at concerts and released original songs with Hololive Gamers. Nekomata's second album, Personya Respect, was released on May 14, 2025, including nine songs. On May 28, she performed her second solo concert at Pia Arena MM in Yokohama.

=== Visual novels ===
Two visual novels starring Nekomata have been released, Okayunyumu and its sequel Okayunyumu R. (Note: In Japan, Okayunyumu is spelt as two words, Okayu Nyumu. The English localization made the title one word.) They were developed by Entergram, which had previously developed Hololive-affiliated VTuber Minato Aqua's Aquarium, and Nekomata supervised their development, requesting the addition of various features. Inugami appears in the first game and all members of Hololive Gamers appear in the sequel. Okayu and the other members of Hololive Gamers voice themselves in the games. In the first game, the player takes in Nekomata, a stray catgirl, and grows closer with her, eventually beginning to date. The first game's ending theme was an original Nekomata song by Yoh Kamiyama. In the sequel, Nekomata and the player vacation in Aomori, and the game features multiple endings. The sequel also features minigames, such as a strip-version of yakyūken, a minigame where you wash foam off of Nekomata, a minigame where you pet Nekomata that features ASMR, a minigame where you take photos of Nekomata, and a trivia game on Nekomata and Aomori.

Nekomata announced the first game in a livestream on October 17, 2024. On February 27, 2025, it was released in Japan on Windows 10 and Windows 11 through physical media, as well as on PlayStation 4 digitally and Nintendo Switch, and, via backwards compatibility, PlayStation 5 and Nintendo Switch 2. In August, a physical version for the Nintendo Switch and a Steam version was released. The Steam version included an English localization which added an English user interface and captions. The sequel was announced during her second concert on May 28, 2025. On March 26, 2026, it was released in Japan on the same platforms as the first game was originally released. The sequel was scheduled to be released on Steam on August 7, 2026, but Entergram announced that it had been delayed on August 6. The Steam version, which contains an English localization, was released on August 25. The sequel was favorably reviewed by Famitsu.

== Personal life ==
Nekomata Okayu is a native of Aomori Prefecture, and sometimes talks in the local Tsugaru dialect on stream.

== Discography ==
=== Studio albums ===
Title	Album details	Peak chart positions			Sales
Title	Album details	JPN	JPN Comb.	JPN Hot	Sales
Poisonya Syndrome	Released: September 6, 2022; Label: Cover Corp.; Formats: CD, digital download, streaming	13	12	10	JPN: 6,265
Personya Respect	Released: May 14, 2025; Label: Cover Corp.; Formats: CD, digital download, streaming	6	6	—	JPN: 12,529
"—" denotes releases that did not chart.

=== Singles ===
==== As lead artist ====
Title	Year	Peak chart positions	Album
Title	Year	JPN DL	Album
"Mogu Mogu Yummy!" (もぐもぐYUMMY!)	2021	47	Poisonya Syndrome
"Detabarecat" (デタバレネコ)	2022	49	Poisonya Syndrome
"Doku no Oujisama" (毒の王子さま)	2022	—	Poisonya Syndrome
"Adieu, Salauds" (アデュー、サロー)	2022	50	Poisonya Syndrome
"Swallow the Venom" (毒杯スワロウ)	2022	73	Poisonya Syndrome
"Neko Kaburi-Na" (ネコカブリーナ)	2024	—	Personya Respect
"Just a Kiss" (キスだけでいいから)	2025	—	Personya Respect
"Decogradation" (デコグラデーション)	2025	—	Personya Respect
"Gazania" (ガザニア)	2025	—	Personya Respect
"Kurukuru Cruise" (with Ninomae Ina'nis)	2025	—	Non-album singles
"Mata Okaeri" (また、おかえり。)	2025	—	Non-album singles
"Non Delicious" (ノンデリシャス)	2026	—	TBA
"—" denotes releases that did not chart.

==== As featured artist ====
Title	Year	Peak chart positions	Album
Title	Year	JPN DL	Album
"Sashimio" (さしみお) (Ookami with Oozora and Nekomata)	2021	96	Non-album singles
"KemomomomomoMof!" (けもももももも！) (with Shirakami)	2026	—	Non-album singles
"—" denotes releases that did not chart.

==== As collaborative artist ====
Title	Year	Peak chart positions	Album
Title	Year	JPN Dig.	Album
"Dodekambitious" (with Sakura Miko, Usada Pekora, and Oozara)	2023	—	Non-album singles
"We are Gamers!!!!" (as Hololive Gamers)	2024	40	Non-album singles
"To Be Continued...." (as Hololive Gamers)	2025	40	Non-album singles
"—" denotes releases that did not chart.
