= Neurotoxin (disambiguation) =

Neurotoxins are toxins that are destructive to nerve tissue.

Neurotoxin may also refer to:

- Neurotoxin (G.I. Joe), character
- "Neurotoxin", 2026 song by Evil Neuro from Do Not Reboot
