= Projekt Melody =

American VTuber

- Occupations: Twitch streamer; YouTuber; Pornographic actress
- Organization: VShojo (2020–2025)

Twitch information
- Channel: projektmelody
- Years active: 2019–present
- Genre: Just Chatting
- Followers: 705 thousand

YouTube information
- Channel: Projekt Melody
- Years active: 2019–present
- Genres: Virtual (Vtubing); gaming; music; Lo-Fi; electronics
- Subscribers: 640 thousand
- Views: 63.0 million
- Last updated: September 27, 2026

Projekt Melody, or more commonly known as Melody (Japanese: メロディー) for short, is an American 3D anime-styled live streamer, VTuber, and pornographic actress. She first appeared when her Twitter account opened in July 2019, and she has live streamed on Chaturbate and Twitch since early 2020. During her first three days of Chaturbate streaming, Melody's Twitter followers rose from 700 to over 20,000 and her sudden rise in popularity had mixed reactions. In late 2020, Melody became a founding member of VShojo, one of the first VTuber talent agencies based in the Western world; she would later leave the company after various controversies. While she describes herself as an artificial intelligence, she is portrayed by a human and not an actual AI (as is the case with streamers such as Neuro-sama, for example).

== Overview ==
DigitrevX, an American animator of anime-style 3D character models for VTubers, was commissioned to create Projekt Melody's original avatar. She is rendered in real time using the game engine Unity. She has purple and blue hair and an adhesive bandage on her nose, and her appearance was influenced by anime and video games such as Ghost in the Shell and Hyperdimension Neptunia.

Melody claims to be an artificial intelligence, with her first appearance in July 2019 on Twitter involving her acting as a broken chat program that progressively developed sentience.

== Live streaming ==
=== Chaturbate ===
Projekt Melody hosted her first stream on Chaturbate on February 7, 2020. During the three days after this stream, her Twitter follower count increased from 700 to more than 20,000.

=== Twitch ===
On March 7, 2020, Melody made her live streaming debut on Twitch, where she was partnered before her first stream was broadcast. By the stream's end, she had over 50,000 followers.

On March 12, 2020, Twitch issued Melody a three-day suspension. On April 7, Twitch updated its nudity and attire policy, establishing new guidelines for acceptable levels of clothing coverage for all streamers on the website, including digital characters like Melody. On November 4, Twitch issued Melody a second suspension due to DigitrevX making a DMCA filing related to a copyright claim over Melody's usage of her model. The suspension was lifted the following day.

On November 24, 2020, Melody announced the launch of VShojo, one of the first Western VTuber talent agencies. On September 24, 2021, Melody debuted a new Live2D-based character model. On July 22, 2025, Melody posted on social media that she would be leaving VShojo.

== Reception ==
Projekt Melody's popularity drew criticism from fellow webcam models, who argued that she does not experience the same degree of vulnerability as human models, and questioned if she belonged on Chaturbate. Projekt Melody subreddit moderator "jyl5555" said that fans enjoy the "wittiness and absurdity of Melody as a concept".

== Awards and nominations ==
Year	Ceremony	Category	Result	Ref.
2023	The Vtuber Awards	Best Tech VTuber	Nominated	
2023	The Vtuber Awards	Lewdtuber of the Year	Won	
2023	The Vtuber Awards	Best Concert Event (Candy Pop Explosion)	Nominated	
2024	The Vtuber Awards	Lewdtuber of the Year	Won	

== See also ==
- Internet celebrity
- Ironmouse
