= VShojo =

Defunct American virtual content creator agency (2020–2025)

VShojo, Inc.
- Type: Private
- Industry: Entertainment industry
- Founded: November 24, 2020; 5 years ago
- Founders: Justin Ignacio; Phillip Fortunat; Daniel Sanders
- Headquarters: San Francisco, California, United States
- Divisions: VShojo Japan
- Subsidiaries: UNIVOLT (VShojo NOVA joint venture with Universal Music Japan)

VShojo, Inc. is a defunct American talent agency that focused on promoting VTuber content creators based in San Francisco, California. Founded in 2020 as the first major VTuber agency fully based in North America, VShojo billed itself as a "talent first" agency oriented towards providing resources (such as models, merchandising, and advertisement opportunities) to its talent. During its operations, it was generally considered one of three major companies in VTubing, alongside Hololive Production and Nijisanji.

On July 21, 2025, Ironmouse announced her departure from VShojo and accused the company of withholding streaming residuals from her, including over $500,000 in revenue intended to be donated to charity. All of her fellow VShojo members subsequently resigned in the following three days. On July 24, 2025, co-founder and CEO Justin "theGunrun" Ignacio announced that VShojo would be ceasing operations.

== History ==
CEO Justin 'theGunrun' Ignacio, a member of the team that founded Twitch, CTO Phillip 'MowtenDoo' Fortunat, a content creator on YouTube, and COO Daniel 'Apek' Sanders, a former digital media attorney, co-founded VShojo to promote and empower English-speaking VTubers. It debuted on November 24, 2020, as one of the first VTuber companies based in the United States and the Western world.

In October 2021, Ironmouse and Veibae were listed, for the first time, among the top 10 female streamers on Twitch based on hours watched. On February 15, 2022, Ironmouse passed one million followers and 75,000 subscribers on Twitch, making her Twitch's most-subscribed female streamer. On February 20, 2022, Ironmouse's Twitch subscription count surpassed 93,000 making her, at the time, the streamer with the most active Twitch subscriptions.

In March 2022, VShojo raised $11 million in a funding round led by Anthos Capital, with goals to expand its focus on working with anime and gaming conventions on content and appearances by its talent, Ignacio's "IRL Backpack" project for mobile video streaming, and a collaboration with the mental health group Rise Above the Disorder.

In July 2022 at Anime Expo, the company announced a new Japanese division, with its inaugural members including independent streamer Kson and Amemiya Nazuna.

On April 26, 2023, VShojo announced via Twitter that Silvervale and Veibae would not be renewing their contracts, with Nyanners following on April 30. In both cases, the streamers retained rights to the characters and other assets that they had developed while under VShojo. A new VTuber for VShojo Japan, Henya the Genius, debuted on May 13, 2023. GEEGA, a pre-existing VTuber, joined the agency on September 2. VShojo's first male VTuber, Kuro Kurenai, debuted on September 30. Another new VTuber for VShojo, Matara Kan, debuted just over two weeks later on October 15. On December 29, VShojo announced that it had mutually agreed to end its contract with Amemiya Nazuna, effective December 31, with Nazuna retaining the rights to her character and assets.

On April 17, 2024, another new VTuber for VShojo, Michi Mochievee, was announced for an April 20 debut. In an article written by Kazuma Hashimoto for the Rolling Stone magazine on July 17, 2024, VShojo was regarded as one of three major VTuber talent agencies, next to Hololive Production and Nijisanji.

On November 14, 2024, VShojo revealed its first full Japanese generation of VTubers, known as VShojo NOVA, with four members: Akatsuki Hotaru, Hestia Happiness, Okamoto Nagi, and Yutori Peke. The four members had been teased in a series of four tweets, posted on both the main VShojo Twitter and the VShojo Japan Twitter, for four days leading up to the group's reveal. The group members' debut dates were not announced until the following day, with Akatsuki Hotaru and Hestia Happiness debuting on November 22, and Okamoto Nagi and Yutori Peke debuting on November 23.

On January 26, 2025, singer, voice actress, and VTuber AmaLee joined VShojo.

On April 28, 2025, VShojo announced that they were formally parting ways with Matara Kan, effective May 5. According to Matara, VShojo made the decision to part ways with her on March 6.

On May 14, 2025, VShojo's CTO of five years, Phillip Fortunat, announced he was leaving the company with immediate effect.

On June 25, 2025, GEEGA announced that she was terminating her contract with VShojo, effective June 27. Also on June 27, founding member Zentreya announced her departure, effective July 11.

On July 5, 2025, VShojo NOVA announced that they had founded a record label, UNIVOLT, in association with Universal Music Japan. The group subsequently released a single, "Starry Connection", under the label that day.

=== Ironmouse scandal, talent exodus, and shutdown ===
On July 21, 2025, founding member Ironmouse announced that she would leave VShojo effective immediately amid legal issues, accusing the company of withholding Twitch revenue from her, including around $500,000 in revenue intended to be donated to the Immune Deficiency Foundation, for over a year. Following her departure, Kuro Kurenai, Apricot, Henya, Hime Hajime, AmaLee, and Michi Mochievee publicly issued support for Ironmouse, as did NOVA's members and former members Matara Kan, Zentreya, and GEEGA; Kson would further announce a stream directly questioning the company's actions and requesting an explanation, later confirming she had privately gotten a response, "but not from the ONE PERSON [sic] I want."

On July 22, during her stream, Kson revealed that she was set to leave VShojo on July 31 due to having not received streaming residuals since September of the prior year; she would instead publicly announce her immediate departure from the company during a live call with the company's Japanese CEO. Kuro Kurenai and Projekt Melody soon followed with posts of their intentions to leave the company, with Kurenai stating that he already submitted a leave of contract on July 11. Michi Mochievee announced on her stream that she had done the same, stating that she was also owed streaming residuals that were never paid. AmaLee would also confirm that she had terminated her contract with VShojo effective immediately, as did Hime Hajime and Haruka Karibu. Veibae, one of the initial departures from the company in 2023, stated that having similar issues with compensation was why she, as well as the other departures from that period, left the company, a sentiment corroborated by Silvervale. Multiple artists and musicians also stated that they were owed payment, and several talents who had privately signed contracts with VShojo but never publicly joined were also impacted, including independent VTuber Mint Fantôme, who was set to lead an idol-focused group in the company before terminating her contract following multiple delays to her VShojo debut.

On July 23, Henya the Genius released a YouTube video confirming her departure from VShojo. This was followed by social media posts from the members of NOVA, which either confirmed their departure or, for Yutori Peke, was informed of her contract termination; the members would also confirm that they were in negotiations with management about NOVA's future outside of VShojo. With NOVA's departures, the Japanese branch of the company had no remaining talent members. Apricot, who had also removed all VShojo branding from her social media profiles, released a statement on July 24 that she left VShojo, shortly after the announcement of its shutdown, later alleging "I didn't even get a chance to finish my termination process before the company claimed to shut down publicly." On July 24, VShojo released a statement that it improperly spent the money that was raised for charity. It was also announced VShojo had run out of money and would be shutting down.

== Talents ==
Name	Branch	VTuber debut	VShojo debut	Exit
Akatsuki Hotaru (Note: Japanese: 暁月ホタル)	Japan (NOVA)	November 22, 2024		July 23, 2025
AmaLee (Monarch)	English	December 11, 2021	January 26, 2025	July 22, 2025
Amemiya Nazuna (Note: Japanese: 飴宮なずな)	Japan	July 16, 2022		December 31, 2023
Apricot (Froot)	English	November 27, 2020		July 24, 2025
GEEGA	English	February 16, 2021	September 2, 2023	June 27, 2025
Haruka Karibu	English	May 8, 2020	December 3, 2022	July 22, 2025
Henya the Genius (Note: Japanese: へにゃ・ざ・じーにあす)	Japan	May 13, 2023		July 23, 2025
Hestia Happiness (Note: Japanese: ヘスティアハピネス)	Japan (NOVA)	July 15, 2023	November 22, 2024	July 23, 2025
Hime Hajime	English	January 30, 2021		July 22, 2025
Ironmouse	English	August 5, 2017	November 24, 2020	July 21, 2025
Kson	Japan	May 1, 2016	July 16, 2022	July 22, 2025
Kuro Kurenai (K9Kuro)	English	September 30, 2023		July 22, 2025
Matara Kan	English	October 15, 2023		May 5, 2025
Michi Mochievee	English	April 20, 2024		July 22, 2025
Nyatasha Nyanners	English	July 17, 2020	November 24, 2020	April 30, 2023
Okamoto Nagi (Note: Japanese: 陵本なぎ)	Japan (NOVA)	November 23, 2024		July 23, 2025
Projekt Melody	English	December 27, 2019	November 24, 2020	July 22, 2025
Silvervale	English	July 30, 2019	November 24, 2020	April 26, 2023
Veibae	English	April 12, 2020	April 9, 2021	April 26, 2023
Yutori Peke (Note: Japanese: 柚鳥ペケ)	Japan (NOVA)	November 23, 2024		July 23, 2025
Zentreya	English	November 26, 2017	November 24, 2020	July 11, 2025
Additional sources:

== Awards and nominations ==
Year	Ceremony	Category	Result	Ref.
2022	The Streamer Awards	Best Content Organization	Nominated	
2023	The Vtuber Awards	Best Vtuber Organization	Nominated	
2023	The Vtuber Awards	Best Concert Event (Candy Pop Explosion)	Nominated	
2023	The Streamer Awards	Best Content Organization	Nominated	
2024	The Streamer Awards	Best Content Organization	Nominated	
2024	The Vtuber Awards	Best Vtuber Organization	Nominated	
