= Mint Fantôme =

American VTuber

- Mint Fantôme's model as designed by Ayamy
- Occupation: VTuber

YouTube information
- Channel: Maid Mint Ch. ミント・ファントーム
- Years active: 2020–2021, 2024–present
- Genres: Gaming; chatting; singing
- Subscribers: 440,000
- Views: 37 million
- Last updated: April 25, 2026

Mint Fantôme (Japanese: ミント・ファントーム), also known as Maid Mint, is an American VTuber. She is part of the idol group Densetsu.EXE. She debuted in July 2020 before retiring in April 2021, and then returning in April 2024.

== Career ==
In a 2025 essay published by Business Insider, Fantôme said she had gone to school for filmography and had a long-standing affinity for Japanese culture and anime. In a 2025 interview with Siliconera, Fantôme also said that she had previously performed as an idol at small venues in Akihabara, Tokyo. Fantôme said that she discovered VTubers years prior and that she watched many affiliated with the agency Hololive Production. Fantôme said she did not think she could be a VTuber, as she was then-living in the United States, until Hololive Production opened auditions for English-speaking creators in 2020. Fantôme said she auditioned and did not get in, but she said that during the process she met multiple independent VTubers and concluded that she could be one without the support of a corporation. Fantôme said she chose to be a VTuber as it allows her to have a public persona while maintaining her anonymity. She said it is her full-time job. She is American.

Fantôme debuted as a VTuber in July 2020. In her fictional lore, she is a ghost maid who is forever 19 years old. Her first model was designed by Kgr and rigged by Artemiz; her most recent model was designed by Ayamy and rigged by Cillia. Her livestreams and online content consist of her playing video games, chatting, and singing, such as with a cover of Re:Zero season 1's opening "Redo". Fantôme retired in April 2021. On April 1, 2024, Fantôme returned to co-host a podcast with the VTuber Matara Kan, a former coworker, and she also announced a return to streaming on April 4. Fantôme and Kan also announced that they were hosting a Q&A at OffKai Expo. Kan was affiliated with the VTuber agency VShojo, which provided assistance to Fantôme and Kan in their ventures, although Fantôme was not affiliated with it. Fantôme has also collaborated with other VTubers, such as an in-person collaboration with Hololive-affiliated VTuber Takanashi Kiara, playing video games with VTubers Nimi Nightmare and Dooby3D, and commentating and participating in a WWE 2K24 event hosted by VTuber Dokibird. In January 2025, Fantôme collaborated with the mobile game Touhou LostWord, playing the game on her livestream and having her cover of the song "Phantom Pain" added to the game.

On July 21, 2025, the VShojo-affiliated VTuber Ironmouse announced that the company had not paid her or donated money she had fundraised for the Immune Deficiency Foundation, a charity. All VTubers affiliated with VShojo subsequently cut ties with the company. Fantôme donated $10,000.01 to a new fundraiser Ironmouse launched for the charity. She also announced that she had previously signed with the company after its CEO was receptive to a proposal she made about joining it as part of an idol group. Fantôme said that the group included her and two other members who had passed an audition process, but it never debuted. Fantôme also said that, while the company had paid out money from her and Kan's podcast's Patreon, it had not paid her money she was owed from merchandise sales and other fees. On November 22, Fantôme debuted with the independent idol group Densetsu.EXE, alongside VTubers Phoebe Chan and Victoria Roman, the other members of the VShojo idol group. It is a partnership with Andrew "Steiner" Hodgson and Setsuna Production. The group released an original song composed by Umaya Aneta, "Densetsu MVPs", and have also made convention appearances.

Fantôme is voice acting the character Kumi Mori in the English dub of the remaster of School Days. In October 2026, she was added as a character to Dragon's Dogma 2.

== Public image ==
Ana Valens of Vice called Fantôme "freaky" and she has the nickname "Freak Fantôme". In December 2024, while playing the video game Bloons Tower Defense 6, after a viewer asked permission to impregnate another viewer, she told her viewers to "Stop getting pregnant! Stop!! Stop pregnancy! Stop getting pregnant. Stop getting pregnant right now!!". In March 2025, while playing the video game Dredge, Fantôme became increasingly excited as the game detailed that a character had left footprints while barefoot, detailing that the feet were large and wide, until the game said the footprints were likely from a man, at which point Fantôme sighed "Aww". Both clips went viral multiple times. Other clips of Fantôme have also gone viral, such as clips of her becoming excited at a belly button while playing the video game MiSide and learning about crushing. At OffKai Expo, she hosted a "Spit and Greet". Jean-Karlo Lemus of Anime News Network described her being cast in School Days, a romance game that includes endings where the protagonist is violently murdered, as "both a massive shock and something extremely in-character for her."

== Discography ==
=== Singles ===
==== As lead artist ====
Title	Year	Ref.
"Welcome to Mint Cafe"	2025	
"Urameshi Summer"	2026	

==== As Densetsu.EXE ====
Title	Year	Ref.
"Densetsu MVPs"	2025	
"Burn On! Hot-Blooded Heroine"	2026	
"3+1"	2026	

==== As collaborative artist ====
Title	Year	Ref.
"Let Us Sing Our Song" (with Ironmouse, Kuro Kurenai, and Bao The Whale)	2024	

== Awards and nominations ==
Ceremony	Year	Category	Result	Ref.
The Vtuber Awards	2024	Miss Vtuber	Nominated	
