= Ironmouse =

Puerto Rican VTuber and singer

- Ironmouse's digital avatar
- Occupations: Twitch streamer; YouTuber; singer
- Organization: VShojo (2020–2025)

Twitch information
- Channel: ironmouse
- Years active: 2017–present
- Genres: Gaming; Just Chatting
- Games: Elden Ring; Lethal Company; Minecraft; Rust; Fortnite
- Followers: 2.56 million

YouTube information
- Channel: ironmouse
- Years active: 2017–present
- Subscribers: 1.9 million
- Views: 442 million
- Last updated: November 1, 2026
- Website: ironmouse.com

Ironmouse (born January 11) is a Puerto Rican VTuber, singer, and Twitch streamer. Active since 2017, she was a founding member of the U.S.-based VTuber agency VShojo and was part of the organization from November 2020 until her departure in July 2025. She is known for her high-profile subathons, musical performances, charity fundraising, and collaborations across gaming and online entertainment.

Ironmouse is a prominent advocate for common variable immunodeficiency (CVID), the immune disorder she lives with. She has promoted plasma donation, held multiple fundraisers, and served as a spokesperson for the Immune Deficiency Foundation. She has raised over $1 million through independent charity campaigns.

She has received multiple industry awards, including Content Creator of the Year at The Game Awards 2023, and is a multi-year winner of Best VTuber at The Streamer Awards. In 2024, she became the most-subscribed Twitch streamer of all time, surpassing Kai Cenat’s first record during a September 2024 subathon, before being surpassed herself by Cenat during a November 2024 subathon.

Beyond streaming, Ironmouse has performed at major events such as The Streamer Awards and Final Fantasy XIV Fan Fest, and has collaborated with companies and creators including Jakks Pacific, Fortnite, and bbno$.

== Life and career ==
=== Early life ===
Ironmouse originally planned to pursue a career as a coloratura soprano opera singer, but was diagnosed with common variable immunodeficiency (CVID), an immune disorder that has left her largely bedridden and isolated. It has also led to a lung infection called mycobacterium avium complex as she revealed in 2021. This required her to remain isolated from others, a situation which intensified in 2020 amid the onset of the COVID-19 pandemic.

=== 2017–2020: Streaming debut and VTuber identity ===
In 2017, she began to pursue a career as a streamer instead, as she was "lonely and wanted something to do". Hesitant to use her real face online, she was inspired by the Japanese entertainer Kizuna AI, the first YouTuber to refer to themselves as a "virtual YouTuber"—to stream with a digital avatar to conceal her identity. Her username comes from the villain Sailor Iron Mouse from the manga series Sailor Moon.

After discovering that there were a growing number of users referring to themselves as VTubers like Kizuna, she began to consider herself one. The Ironmouse persona was expanded into a character, which she referred to as a "bigger version of me" and being like a superhero costume; her avatar usually takes the form of a horned demon with pink and purple hair, while its backstory—influenced by her having jokingly referred to herself on-stream as such—suggests that the character is a personification of Satan itself. Ironmouse's distinctive, high-pitched speaking voice is the result of a lung infection stemming from common variable immunodeficiency (CVID) which also resulted in her being on oxygen support 24/7; she has remarked that some people have refused to take her seriously because of her voice, and that some fellow streamers have been shocked to find out that it was her real voice, and not being manipulated with a voice changer.

=== 2020–2025: Growth and VShojo membership ===
Amid a growth trend for streamers in general, and especially VTubers, Ironmouse's audience on Twitch began to see increases over 2020 and 2021. The increasing revenue from her streams also allowed her to afford higher-quality health care. In turn, improvements to her condition enabled her to perform longer streams on a more regular basis. In November 2020, Ironmouse was announced as one of the charter members of VShojo, a new U.S.-based agency of English-language VTubers, joining other streamers and personalities such as Nyanners and Projekt Melody.

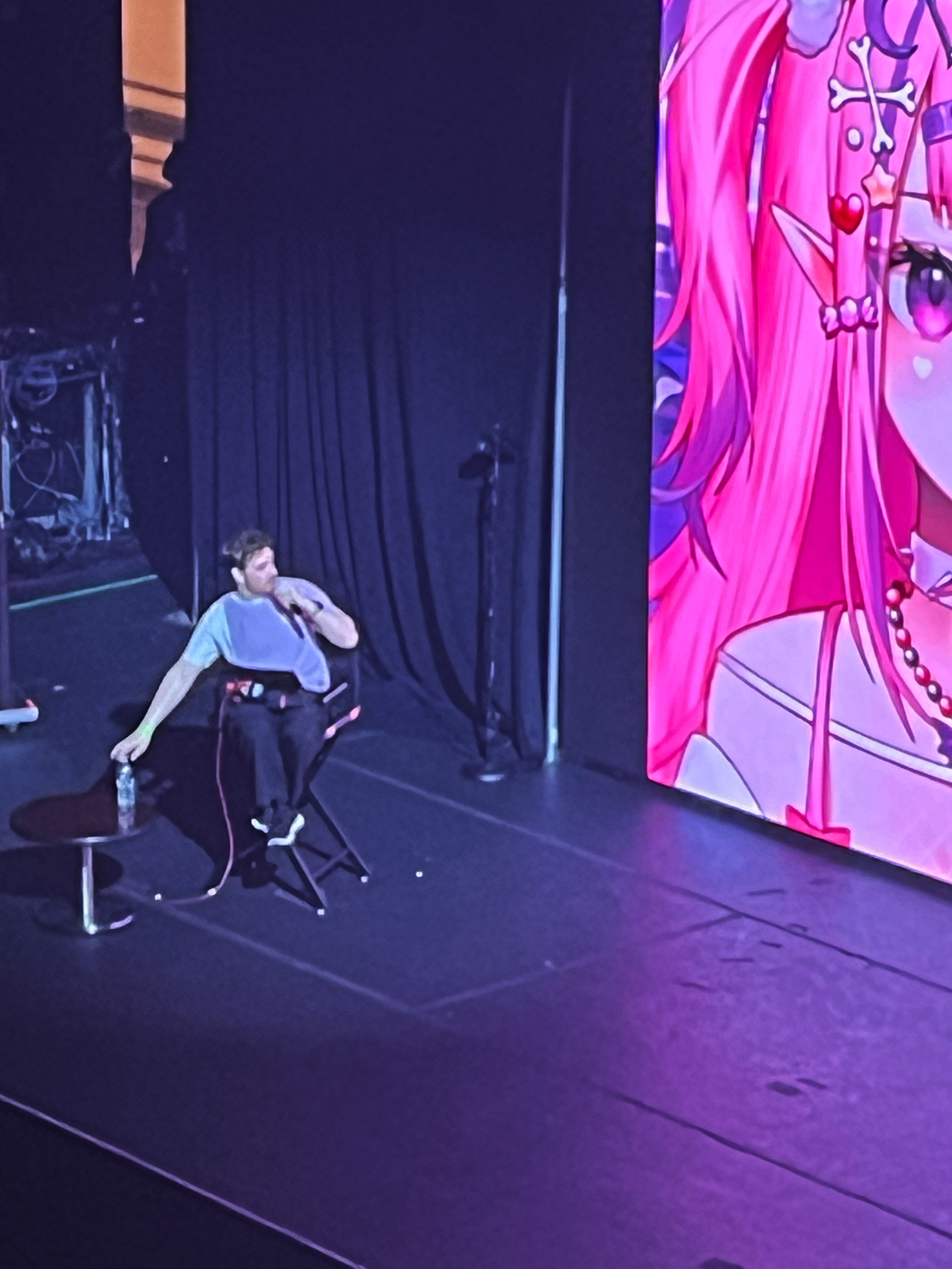
CDawgVA (seated, left) and Ironmouse (on screen, right) during a panel for Anime Expo in 2024

Ironmouse is known for her frequent collaborations and friendship with Welsh YouTuber CDawgVA. Their dynamic has been described as complementary, with Ironmouse being more chaotic and energetic in contrast to CDawgVA’s more grounded personality. The two have collaborated across various projects, including appearances in each other's video content, joint participation in streaming events, and voice roles in games.

In February 2022, Ironmouse held a subathon event, a nonstop stream in which a countdown clock was extended whenever viewers purchased paid subscriptions or otherwise made donations to the channel. The stream remained online even when she was asleep, during which other content, such as videos, and appearances by her friends and other guests, were featured. Over the course of the event, which ran for a total of 31 days through March 7, 2022, Ironmouse became the most-subscribed to female streamer on Twitch, and had the largest number of active subscribers of all Twitch channels at the time (although short of an overall record set by Ludwig during a similar event he held in 2021), with nearly 172,000 subscribers in total by the end of the event. Ironmouse has occasionally hosted a talk show, Speak of the Devil, in which she interviews various VTubers and online personalities.

According to data from StreamElements and Rainmaker, Ironmouse was the eighth-most watched streamer on Twitch during the month of February 2022—marking the first time that a VTuber had made their monthly top 10. Discussing the event, Ironmouse felt that it was "the only time I didn't feel lonely because I felt like I had somebody there all the time. It was the least lonely I've ever felt in a long time." In March 2022, she was nominated for Best VTuber at The Streamer Awards.

In December 2022, she was listed among the "heroes" on the Plasma Hero website for raising awareness about CVID and encouraging viewers to donate plasma. She has also received praise for encouraging donations to The Immune Deficiency Foundation (IDF), a charitable organization which helps people suffering from conditions like hers through research and improving the quality of life of people suffering from primary immunodeficiency. According to StreamsCharts, Ironmouse was the second most-watched female Twitch streamer of 2022, behind Amouranth. In March 2023, she won Best VTuber at The Streamer Awards.

In June 2023, Ironmouse held a second subathon event as a charity event, with half of all revenue from Twitch subscriptions and Bits, as well as merchandise sales during the event, being donated to the Immune Deficiency Foundation. The subathon broke her previous record of 172,000 subscribers and set a new record of 205,488 subscribers.

On December 7, 2023, Ironmouse won the award for Content Creator of the Year at The Game Awards 2023, becoming the first VTuber to win in the category. In February 2024, she repeated as Best VTuber and was also nominated for Streamer of the Year at The Streamer Awards.

On September 10, 2024, YouTube suspended Ironmouse's VOD channel, reportedly due to copyright strikes. On September 20, her main YouTube channel was also suspended; in response, she tweeted that she was "incredibly sad and shocked". Both of Ironmouse's YouTube channels were reinstated on September 23. On September 24, Ironmouse broke the all-time subscription record for a female streamer on Twitch for the third consecutive year, exceeding her previous record of 205,488 subscribers. That same month, Ironmouse overtook Kai Cenat as the most-subscribed channel on Twitch, setting a new all-time record for the service on September 30. Her record lasted until November 2024, when it was broken by Cenat. In December 2024, Ironmouse once again won the Streamer Award for Best VTuber, and was also nominated for Best Marathon Stream and the Sapphire Award. An annual report from StreamsCharts showed that Ironmouse was the most-watched female streamer on Twitch in 2024.

In June 2025, Ironmouse was featured by Canadian rapper bbno$ in his song "1–800"; the rapper also cosplayed as Ironmouse after meeting a goal for likes on X.

=== 2025–present: Departure from VShojo and independent career ===
On July 21, 2025, Ironmouse announced that she had resigned from VShojo effective immediately, accusing the agency of having not paid her a "significant" amount of money, and of owing the Immune Deficiency Foundation at least $500,000 in unpaid donations from her Twitch revenue. In the aftermath of her announcement, all of VShojo's remaining members also publicly resigned from the agency, with former members such as Kson also presenting similar allegations of unpaid revenue; the company's shutdown would be announced on July 24, three days after her video's release. Concurrent with her departure, Ironmouse launched an independently-run charity campaign for the Immune Deficiency Foundation; in two days, the fundraiser surpassed $1 million. In August, she appeared on Rolling Stone's list of the 25 Most Influential Creators of 2025.

At The Streamer Awards 2025, Ironmouse performed “We All Lift Together” and “Lullaby of the Manifold” from the Warframe soundtrack alongside professional opera singer and YouTuber MarcoMeatball. She also received two nominations that year for Best VTuber and Best Stream Duo with CDawgVA.

In March 2026, Ironmouse and Jakks Pacific, a U.S. toy and consumer‑products manufacturer, announced a merchandise collaboration. The partnership made Jakks the first major American producer of officially licensed Ironmouse merchandise, including figures, plush, collectibles, tech accessories, and cosplay items. The products are intended for distribution through Jakks’ direct‑to‑consumer platforms, Ironmouse’s merchandise storefronts, select retail partners, and collector‑focused outlets.

In June 2026, Ironmouse performed a short live concert at Final Fantasy XIV Fan Fest in Anaheim, singing several songs from the game as part of the event’s official programming. Square Enix later highlighted her appearance on social media, thanking Ironmouse for joining the event and listing the songs she performed, including “Give It All,” “Sinister,” and “Return to Oblivion.”

In July 2026, Ironmouse, alongside AmaLee, Dokibird, and Rin Penrose, launched The Wildcard Club, a HYBE-backed music project unveiled during OffKai Expo. The four creators serve as "captains" of the initiative, which is described as a platform supporting independent VTubers in the production of original songs, albums, music videos, and live performances.

== Philanthropy and CVID awareness ==
From early in her career, Ironmouse has been keen on raising awareness about common variable immunodeficiency (CVID) and primary immunodeficiency (PI). In an interview with Plasma Hero, she said, "At the time, I think I was so worried I didn't realize how talking about it could raise awareness; I don't make my illness the main focus of my content, but I do speak about it from time to time for education and awareness and to explain why I may not be feeling my best at times". On August 4, 2021, she held a charity event for the Immune Deficiency Foundation (IDF) and raised over $100,000. This encouraged other creators such as CDawgVA to follow in her footsteps and raise more money for the charity. In an interview with the IDF, CDawgVA acknowledged Ironmouse's role in educating him about PI and the IDF. She also hosted a 30-day subathon in June 2023 and a 39-day subathon in September 2024, where she donated half of all the subscription income to the IDF.

Ironmouse also has raised a significant amount of awareness for donations and the importance of plasma. She stated in an interview with Plasma Hero, "I know so many people encourage blood donation, and I want to make sure I can reach as many people as I can to tell people about living with a PI and donating plasma. I want more people to know that we are here and we need support, but I also want people to know that they are not alone." She used her platform to encourage more people to donate plasma which has been well received by her viewers. Her efforts for raising awareness were also well recognized by the Immune Deficiency Foundation (IDF), which earned her the "Plasma Hero Award" at the 2024 PI Conference. She is also artistically involved in raising awareness. On June 12, 2024, Ironmouse released her single "Carry On", which was the ending song for the "Compromised: Life Without Immunity" documentary by the Immune Deficiency Foundation.

== Video game appearances ==
In May 2023, Ironmouse was featured as part of a VShojo collaboration for Smite, which included an Ironmouse skin and voice pack for the character Persephone.

On December 14, 2025, Ironmouse was featured as part of a bbno$ virtual concert briefly available in Peak.

In August 2026, Ironmouse was added to Fortnite Battle Royale as a Sprite—a new type of companion introduced in chapter 7 season 3—which provides health regeneration when the player is low, along with Cloak‑based partial invisibility and low‑gravity movement while active. The Sprite was accidentally released early during the July 30 v41.30 update before being vaulted, with Epic Games later confirming a proper launch on August 4, 2026 to coincide with her nine-year anniversary of streaming. This was followed by an Icon Series skin and bundle released on September 18, 2026.

In October 2026, she collaborated with Sega for a Halloween-themed costume event introducing outfits inspired by her character design to the mobile game Hatsune Miku: Colorful Stage. She served as a design director for the event which introduced official in-game premium costumes, a free login campaign, and promotional artwork created in collaboration with artists epebe and Rosuuri.

== Discography ==
=== Singles ===
List of singles, showing year released
Title	Year	Peak chart positions	Album	Ref.
Title	Year	US Dance	Album	Ref.
"Waifu Jam”	2023	—	Non-album singles	
"Anarchy" (featuring Bubi)	2023	—	Non-album singles	
"Sour Taste"	2023	—	Non-album singles	
"Battery"	2023	—	Non-album singles	
"Rodents Kingdom"	2024	—	Non-album singles	
"Devil" (featuring Bubi)	2024	—	Non-album singles	
"Carry On"	2024	—	Non-album singles	
"Battery 2"	2024	—	Non-album singles	
"Time to Feast"	2024	—	Non-album singles	
"Cry for Me (Wa Wa Wa)" (featuring Bubi)	2024	19	Non-album singles	
"Music Box of Fate"	2025	—	Non-album singles	
"Hell Again"	2025	—	Non-album singles	
"Meow"	2026	—	Non-album singles	
"Stay Focused"	2026	—	Non-album singles	
"Aren’t We All the Worst?"	2026	—	Non-album singles	

=== Covers ===
List of covers, showing year released
Title	Year	Original From	Ref.
"KING"	2022	Kanaria	
"The Vampire"	2022	Deco*27	
"Hollow Hunger"	2023	Overlord IV	
"Shanti"	2023	wotaku feat. Kaito	
"(Not) A Devil"	2024	Deco*27	
"Super Shy"	2024	NewJeans	
"Headless Angel"	2024	Goddess of Victory: Nikke	
"Otonoke"	2024	Dandadan	
"Abracadabra"	2025	Lady Gaga	
"Left Right"	2025	XG	
"Aishite Aishite Aishite"	2026	Kikuo	
"PLAY"	2026	Giga	
"Give It All"	2026	Final Fantasy XIV	
"Sinister"	2026	Final Fantasy XIV	
"Return to Oblivion"	2026	Final Fantasy XIV	

=== Duets and collaborations ===
List of featured appearances, showing year released
Title	Year	Collaborator	Peak chart positions		Original from	Ref.
Title	Year	Collaborator	US Dance Pop	NZ Hot	Original from	Ref.
"Omae Wa Mou"	2021	Caleb Hyles	—	—	Shibayan Records	
"Summer"	2021	Dad	—	—	—	
"Virtual Realities"	2022	Magic Circuit & Nyatasha Nyanners	—	—	Please Stay Connected	
"Getcha!"	2022	Nyatasha Nyanners	—	—	Giga & KIRA	
"Zombies"	2022	VShojo	—	—	Deco*27	
"Ticking Away"	2023	AverageJonas & SMLE	—	—	Valorant	
"Say My Name"	2023	CyYu	—	—	Beetlejuice Musical	
"This Is Halloween"	2023	VShojo	—	—	The Nightmare Before Christmas	
"Snow Halation"	2023	VShojo	—	—	Love Live!	
"All I Want For Christmas Is You"	2023	Apricot	—	—	Mariah Carey	
"One More Light"	2024	Zentreya	—	—	Linkin Park	
"Shikairo Days"	2024	Caleb Hyles, girl_dm_, & Will Stetson	—	—	My Deer Friend Nokotan	
"Let Us Sing Our Song"	2024	Mint Fantôme, Kuro Kurenai, Bao The Whale	—	—	—	
"I Put a Spell on You"	2024	VShojo	—	—	Hocus Pocus	
"VShojo Disney Villain Mashup"	2024	VShojo	—	—	Disney	
"Never Gonna Give You Up"	2025	VShojo	—	—	Rick Astley	
"1–800"	2025	bbno$	13	27	bbno$	
"How It's Done"	2025	Mori Calliope	—	—	KPop Demon Hunters	
"Free"	2025	Caleb Hyles	—	—	KPop Demon Hunters	
"Alicia/Lumiere"	2025	Nerissa Ravencroft & Elizabeth Rose Bloodflame	—	—	Clair Obscur: Expedition 33	
"We All Lift Together"	2025	MarcoMeatball	—	—	Warframe	
"Lullaby of the Manifold"	2025	MarcoMeatball	—	—	Warframe	
"Daidaidaidaidaikirai"	2026	Michi Mochievee	—	—	Amala ft Hatsune Miku, Kasane Teto	
"Ai Scream!"	2026	Henya the Genius, Michi Mochievee	—	—	AiScReam	
"Gnarly"	2026	Michi Mochievee, K9Kuro	—	—	Katseye	
"Waifu Jam (Indie Version)"	2026	kson	—	—	—	
Go Go Go		CG5 (Charlie Green)	-	-	-	

== Filmography ==
Video games

Year	Title	Role	Source
2023	Smite	Persephone (voice pack)	
2024	Granblue Fantasy Versus: Rising	Dormouse	
2026	Bonnie Bear Saves Frogtime	Vleer	
2026	Fortnite Battle Royale	Ironmouse Sprite/Icon Skin	

== Awards and nominations ==
Ceremony	Year	Category	Result	Ref.
Streamy Awards	2022	Best VTuber	Nominated	
Streamy Awards	2023	Streamer of the Year	Nominated	
Streamy Awards	2023	Best VTuber	Nominated	
The Game Awards	2023	Content Creator of the Year	Won	
The Vtuber Awards	2023	VTuber of the Year	Won	
The Vtuber Awards	2023	Miss VTuber	Won	
The Vtuber Awards	2023	Best Streamed Event (Ironmouse Subathon 2023)	Won	
The Vtuber Awards	2023	Best Concert Event (Candy Pop Explosion)	Nominated	
The Vtuber Awards	2024	VTuber of the Year	Nominated	
The Vtuber Awards	2024	League of Their Own	Won	
The Vtuber Awards	2024	Best VTuber Event (Ironmouse Subathon 3)	Nominated	
The Streamer Awards	2021	Best VTuber Streamer	Nominated	
The Streamer Awards	2022	Best VTuber	Won	
The Streamer Awards	2022	Best Just Chatting Streamer	Nominated	
The Streamer Awards	2023	Streamer of the Year	Nominated	
The Streamer Awards	2023	Best VTuber	Won	
The Streamer Awards	2024	The Sapphire Award	Nominated	
The Streamer Awards	2024	Best VTuber	Won	
The Streamer Awards	2024	Best Marathon Stream (ironmouse Subathon 2024)	Nominated	
The Streamer Awards	2025	Best VTuber	Nominated	
The Streamer Awards	2025	Best Stream Duo (with CDawgVA)	Nominated	
The Streamer Awards	2026	Best VTuber	Won	

== See also ==
- Internet celebrity
- List of most-subscribed Twitch channels
