= The Vtuber Awards =

Annual awards presented to VTubers

- Awarded for: Best in the VTuber industry
- Country: United States
- First award: December 16, 2023; 2 years ago
- Website: thevtuberawards.com

The Vtuber Awards, also styled as The VTuber Awards, were awards presented to the best in the VTuber industry organized by OTK-owned talent management company Mythic Talent. The first ceremony was held in 2023.

== Process ==
Users are given an option to submit nominations, and afterwards they are given an option to choose one nominee for each category.

== History ==
=== 2023 ===
The Vtuber Awards 2023
- Sponsored by: Fansly; iBUYPOWER; Oh Baby! Kart; WePlay Studios; Mythic Talent
- Date: December 16, 2023
- Country: United States
- Hosted by: Filian
- Preshow hosts: FalseEyeD; Sinder

Highlights
- Most awards: Ironmouse (3)
- Most nominations: Zentreya (3)
- Vtuber of the Year: Ironmouse
- Website: https://thevtuberawards.com/

Online coverage
- Runtime: 5 hours, 8 minutes
- Viewership: 471 thousand

The first edition was held on December 16, 2023 at the WePlay Esports Arena in Los Angeles, California. It was hosted by Filian in a room normally for esports and broadcast on her Twitch channel. Mythic Talent, Filian's agency, was the producer of the ceremony.

Although VTubers had a dedicated Streamy Awards category and won Content Creator of the Year at The Game Awards 2023, The Vtuber Awards were, according to Morgan Sung at TechCrunch, "one of the first of its kind [...] for VTubing". Regarding the idea for The VTuber Awards, Filian said: "In every awards show, VTubers are often a footnote or sometimes treated as a unique, strange thing, and so the idea for these awards is like, 'Why not have a show for ourselves?'".

The ceremony was held on a virtual stage designed in Unreal Engine, after plans for a physical stage was scrapped because according to Chief Visionary Officer of WePlay Studios Maksym Bilonogov, "it's not the way, it’s not the right philosophy". According to Filian, WePlay Studios covered around half of the total production costs, which amounted to a total of around USD $100,000, with the remaining costs split between Mythic Talent and Filian herself through the show's sponsors.

Among VTubers affiliated with VShojo, Zentreya received three nominations and Ironmouse won three awards. Several other VShojo VTubers also received awards and nominations, including Matara Kan, Henya the Genius, Projekt Melody, and Zentreya. MrAJCosplay of Anime News Network praised Projekt Melody's acceptance speech for her Lewdtuber of The Year award as "a wonderful speech about the award representing how far the community has come in breaking down social barriers".

In addition to several nominations, Hololive Production and its affiliated VTubers won nine of the awards at the 2023 Vtuber Awards, including Best VTuber Organization. Nijisanji VTubers also had several nominations and awards, including two wins by Selen Tatsuki for Best FPS VTuber and Gamer of the Year. Shylily, in addition to presenting the Miss VTuber Award to Ironmouse, won the Best Chatting/Zatsu VTuber Award. For Indie VTubers, Vedal987, creator of Neuro-sama, won the Best Tech VTuber award.

Winners are listed first, highlighted in boldface, and indicated with a double dagger (‡). The lists are arranged alphabetically, except for the winner.

**Best Music Vtuber**: **Mori Calliope**‡; Hoshimachi Suisei; Akuma Nihmune; obkatiekat	**Best Art Vtuber**: **Ninomae Ina'nis**‡; Anny; Yoclesh; Yuniiho
**Best FPS Vtuber**: **Selen Tatsuki**‡; Apricot (Froot); Shishiro Botan; Shu Yamino	**Best Minecraft Vtuber**: **Kaela Kovalskia**‡; Ceres Fauna; Henya the Genius; Pomu Rainpuff
**Best Roleplay/ASMR Vtuber**: **Ceres Fauna**‡; CottontailVA; Sinder; Vox Akuma	**Best Chatting/Zatsu Vtuber**: **Shylily**‡; Gosegu; Matara Kan; Takanashi Kiara
**Best Tech Vtuber**: **Vedal987**‡; CodeMiko; Projekt Melody; Zentreya	**Funniest Vtuber**: **Chibidoki**‡; Kuro Kurenai; MurderCrumpet; Zentreya
**Most Chaotic Vtuber**: **Kobo Kanaeru**‡; Chibidoki; Pipkin Pippa; Trickywi	**League of Their Own**: **FUWAMOCO**‡; Houshou Marine; Onigiri; Zentreya
**Hidden Gem**: **Fufu**‡; Caelum; Kaichinzu; Omi	**Rising Star**: **Henya the Genius**‡; Bbyruthless; Camila; Sinder
**Miss Vtuber**: **Ironmouse**‡; AmaLee; Elira Pendora; Silvervale	**Best Vtuber Organization**: **Hololive Production**‡; Idol; Nijisanji; VShojo
**Rising Vtuber Organization**: **Phase-Connect**‡; V-Dere; VchiBan; 3AM	**Vtuber Clipper**: **Cooksie**‡; Low Effort Clips; Roach Chan.; Sakasandayo
**Vtuber Parent of The Year**: **2wintails**‡; Dyarikku; Iron Vertex; jjinomu	**Most Dedicated Fanbase**: **Gawr Gura's Chumbuds**‡; Shoto's Guildies; Vox Akuma's Kindred; Akuma Nihmune's Noombas
**Best Philanthropic Event**: **Mika Melatika's 60-Hour Charity Marathon**‡; Vexoria's BCRF Charity Stream; Vox Akuma's Save Charity Stream	**Best Concert Event**: **Connect the World – Hololive English**‡; Candy Pop Explosion – VShojo; Isegye Festival – Isegye Idol
**Best Streamed Event**: **Ironmouse Subathon**‡; Hololive Sports Festival; VSaikyo	**Stream Game of The Year**: **Suika Game**‡; Baldur's Gate 3; HoloCure – Save the Fans!; Only Up!
**Lewdtuber of The Year**: **Projekt Melody**‡; CottontailVA; FeFe; Saruei	**Gamer of The Year**: **Selen Tatsuki**‡; Koseki Bijou; Kuzuha; Rainhoe
**Vtuber of The Year**: **Ironmouse**‡; Hyakumantenbara Salome; Shylily; Usada Pekora	

=== 2024 ===
The Vtuber Awards 2024
- Sponsored by: Fansly; Gamer Supps; Bilibili; Phase Connect; Corepunk; Mythic Talent; Twitch; WePlay Studios
- Date: December 14, 2024
- Country: United States
- Hosted by: Filian; Shylily
- Preshow hosts: FalseEyeD; Sinder

Highlights
- Most awards: Ceres Fauna; Dokibird (2)
- Most nominations: Dokibird (4)
- Vtuber of the Year: FUWAMOCO
- Website: https://thevtuberawards.com/

Online coverage
- Runtime: 4 hours, 27 minutes

The second edition was held on December 14, 2024 at the WePlay Esports Arena in Los Angeles, California. It was co-hosted by Filian and Shylily and broadcast on the former's Twitch and YouTube channels. For the first time, the award show also featured a halftime show: a 3D concert performed by Phase Connect's Ashelia Rinkou and Kaneko Lumi. WePlay Studios was the producer of the ceremony.

Winners are listed first, highlighted in boldface, and indicated with a double dagger (‡). The lists are arranged alphabetically, except for the winner.

**Best Just Chatting 'Zatsudan' Vtuber**: **Ceres Fauna**‡; Matara Kan; Michi Mochievee; Sinder	**Best Art Vtuber**: **Raora Panthera**‡; Apricot (Froot); Dyarikku; Ninomae Ina'nis
**Best FPS Vtuber**: **Dokibird**‡; Apricot (Froot); Shishiro Botan; Kuzuha	**Best Roleplay/ASMR Vtuber**: **Ceres Fauna**‡; CottontailVA; Fallenshadow (Shondo); Nene Amano; Sinder
**Best Music Vtuber**: **Hoshimachi Suisei**‡; Bao; Mori Calliope; Obkatiekat	**Best Tech Vtuber**: **Vedal987**‡; Dooby3D; Shindigs; Uwoslab
**Funniest Vtuber**: **Chibidoki**‡; Bao; Gigi Murin; Kenji; Koseki Bijou	**Most Chaotic Vtuber**: **Gigi Murin**‡; Kobo Kanaeru; Pipkin Pippa; Trickywi
**Hidden Gem**: **LongLiveReya**‡; TippyHendrix; YanderEgg; YourAverageBo	**Rising Star**: **Arielle**‡; CerberVT; ChaChaYourVMom; Yukinoshita Peo
**League of Their Own**: **Ironmouse**‡; Dooby3D; Gosegu; Houshou Marine; Takanashi Kiara	**Mister Vtuber**: **PorcelainMaid**‡; Gavis Bettel; Ike Eveland; Shoto
**Miss Vtuber**: **Takanashi Kiara**‡; Lize Helesta; Mint Fantôme; Ushio Ebi	**Rising Vtuber Organization**: **Mythos**‡; V4Mirai; VAllure; Vchiban
**Most Dedicated Fanbase**: **Dokibird's Dragoons**‡; Shondo's Fallen; Nerissa Ravencroft's Jailbirds; Vedal987's Swarm	**Best Vtuber Organization**: **Hololive**‡; Isegye Idol; Nijisanji; Phase Connect; VShojo
**Vtuber Parent of The Year**: **Nanoless**‡; 2wintails; Dyarikku; Kaya7hara	**Best Vtuber Event**: **HoloGTA – Hololive**‡; Breaking Dimensions – Hololive English; Ironmouse Subathon 3; Wrestletuber – Dokibird
**Stream Game of the Year**: **Lethal Company**‡; Buckshot Roulette; Elden Ring; Liar's Bar	**Gamer of The Year**: **Zentreya**‡; Akemi Nekomachi; Kaela Kovalskia; Koseki Bijou; Tenma Maemi
**Lewdtuber of The Year**: **Projekt Melody**‡; CottontailVA; FeFe; SquChan	**Vtuber of The Year**: **FUWAMOCO**‡; Dokibird; Ironmouse; Tsukino Mito; Vedal987

=== Future ===
In August 2025, WePlay Studios announced that they would no longer work on the VTuber Awards, in protest of Filian's involvement in a joint project with a Russian VTuber, which the company stated was inconsistent with its values (the company has boycotted Russian or Belarusian companies or individuals since the Russian invasion of Ukraine). On social media, western VTuber fans criticized the decision as overly harsh, saying that "nationality doesn't mean political stance." Media advocates for a boycott of Russian projects, as well as Ukrainian audiences, supported the decision.
