= Kami-Con =

Anime convention in Alabama, United States

Coordinates: 33°31′26″N 86°48′43″W

- Status: Active
- Genre: Anime, Manga, gaming and pop culture.
- Venue: Birmingham–Jefferson Convention Complex
- Location: Birmingham, Alabama
- Country: United States
- Inaugurated: 2009
- Attendance: 9,000 (est.) in 2022
- Organizer: Bama SOS Brigade
- Website: http://www.kamicon.net/

Kami-Con is an annual three-day anime convention held during January or February in Birmingham, Alabama at the Birmingham–Jefferson Convention Complex by the Bama SOS Brigade, a student organization from the University of Alabama.

== Programming ==
The convention typically offers anime screenings, concerts, cosplay contests, dodgeball tournaments, a Pokecenter, rave, tabletop games, vendors, and video game tournaments. The convention contains a storyline/plot, which allows attendees to pick sides, and affect the outcome of the story by participating in various contests.

== History ==
Kami-Con is organized by the Bama SOS Brigade, which was started by Raymond Lenzner and a handful of students at the University of Alabama. Construction in the Ferguson Center during the 2010 convention caused some events such as video gaming to change locations. The convention moved to the Birmingham–Jefferson Convention Complex in 2013. Kami-Con 2021 was cancelled due to the COVID-19 pandemic. The 2022 convention had COVID-19 policies that required masks and either vaccination or a negative test.

=== Event history ===
Dates	Location	Atten.	Guests
April 25–26, 2009	University of Alabama – Ferguson Center; Tuscaloosa, Alabama	460	Mandy Clark, Bryan King, Kittyhawk, Aaron Pabon, Seraphina, and Stephanie Yanez.
April 24–25, 2010	University of Alabama – Ferguson Center; Tuscaloosa, Alabama	1,267	Robert Axelrod, Bea Billany, Lisa Furukawa, Kevin "Chicknwings" Hicks, Vic Mignogna, Aaron Pabon, and Seraphina.
February 19–20, 2011	University of Alabama – Ferguson Center; Tuscaloosa, Alabama	2,600	91.8 The Fan, Bea Billany, Johnny Yong Bosch, Carly Dorsey, Kyle Hebert, Kevin "Chicknwings" Hicks, Aaron Pabon, Seraphina, Micah Solusod, and Charity Youngblood.
February 3–5, 2012	University of Alabama – Ferguson Center; Tuscaloosa, Alabama	2,500	501st Legion, 91.8 The Fan, Robert Axelrod, Bea Billany, Electric Moon, Crispin Freeman, Kevin "Chicknwings" Hicks, Marble Hornets, Marin M. Miller, Chris Niosi, Aaron Pabon, Seraphina, Ashley Serena, Sonny Strait, Eric Stuart, Leo "That SciFi Guy" Thompson, Cristina Vee, Doug Walker, and Nick Wright.
February 15–17, 2013	Birmingham–Jefferson Convention Complex; Birmingham, Alabama	3,700	91.8 The Fan, Bea Billany, Colleen Clinkenbeard, Kevin "Chicknwings" Hicks, Laugh Out Loud, Vic Mignogna, Marin M. Miller, Chris Niosi, Aaron Pabon, Michelle Ruff, Christopher Sabat, Seraphina, Leo "That SciFi Guy" Thompson, Doug Walker, Greg Wicker, and Nick Wright.
February 14–16, 2014	Birmingham–Jefferson Convention Complex; Birmingham, Alabama	4,172	Linda Ballantyne, Bea Billany, Beau Billingslea, Steve Blum, Melissa Fahn, Katie Griffin, Laugh Out Loud, Wendee Lee, Marin M. Miller, Aaron Pabon, Toby Proctor, Susan Roman, Leo "That SciFi Guy" Thompson, Greg Wicker, and Nick Wright.
February 27 – March 1, 2015	Birmingham–Jefferson Convention Complex; Birmingham, Alabama	4,800	91.8 The Fan, Curtis Arnott, Bea Billany, Ed Chavez, Mr. Creepy Pasta, Scott Frerichs, Kazha, Nick Landis, Laugh Out Loud, Marin M. Miller, Aaron Pabon, Bryce Papenbrook, Jessie Pridemore, Lawrence Simpson, Micah Solusod, Leo "That SciFi Guy" Thompson, Cristina Vee, Doug Walker, Greg Wicker, Nick Wright, and Apphia Yu (Ayu Sakata).
March 11–13, 2016	Birmingham–Jefferson Convention Complex; Birmingham, Alabama	4,700	91.8 The Fan, Robert Axelrod, Linda Ballantyne, Chalk Twins, Cosplay, Inc., Mr. Creepy Pasta, Richard Epcar, Jacob Grady, Catherine Jones, Kazha, Aaron Pabon, Jessie Pridemore, Toby Proctor, Ian Sinclair, Ellyn Stern, Nicki Taylor, Cristina Vee, Aurelio Voltaire, and Greg Wicker.
January 27–29, 2017	Birmingham–Jefferson Convention Complex; Birmingham, Alabama	6,800	Yuu Asakawa, Bea Billany, Zach Callison, Mr. Creepy Pasta, Kara Eberle, Scott Frerichs, Caleb Hyles, Kazha, Nick Landis, Vic Mignogna, Marin M. Miller, Aaron Pabon, Malcolm Ray, Lawrence Simpson, Leo "That SciFi Guy" Thompson, Tokyo Attack!, Greg Wicker, and Alexander Shunnarah.
January 26–28, 2018	Birmingham–Jefferson Convention Complex; Birmingham, Alabama	7,527	John Anderson, Dante Basco, Bea Billany, Johnny Yong Bosch, Greg Cipes, Mr. Creepy Pasta, Jonny Cruz, Barbara Dunkelman, Kara Eberle, Andy Field, Scott Frerichs, Jacob Grady, Todd Haberkorn, Catherine Jones, Lindsay Jones, Kazha, Phil LaMarr, Nick Landis, Marin M. Miller, Aaron Pabon, Jessie Pridemore, Malcolm Ray, Michelle Ruff, Lawrence Simpson, Corinne Sudberg, Vofan, Doug Walker, Rob Walker, and Arryn Zech.
February 22–24, 2019	Birmingham–Jefferson Convention Complex; Birmingham, Alabama	9,000	John Anderson, Brentalfloss, SungWon Cho, Mr. Creepy Pasta, Estelle, Katie George, Caitlin Glass, Chuck Huber, Catherine Jones, Kazha, Lauren Landa, Erica Mendez, NateWantsToBattle, Aaron Pabon, Jeremy Shada, Micah Solusod, Vitamin H Productions, and Apphia Yu (Ayu Sakata).
January 31 – February 2, 2020	Birmingham–Jefferson Convention Complex; Birmingham, Alabama		Zach Aguilar, Steve Blum, Leah Clark, Mr. Creepy Pasta, Jim Cummings, Yaya Han, Samantha Inoue-Harte, Catherine Jones, Kazha, E. Jason Liebrecht, Aaron Pabon, Rob Paulsen, Jad Saxton, Cristina Vee, and Vitamin H Productions.
February 11–13, 2022	Birmingham–Jefferson Convention Complex; Birmingham, Alabama	9,000 (est.)	Corina Boettger, Kira Buckland, Mr. Creepy Pasta, Aaron Dismuke, Yaya Han, Erika Harlacher, Jill Harris, Caleb Hyles, Samantha Inoue-Harte, Kazha, Faye Mata, Adam McArthur, Casey Mongillo, Sarah Natochenny, Aaron Pabon, Dallas Reid, Jonah Scott, Synth Reality Productions, Vitamin H Productions, and Anne Yatco.
February 10-12, 2023	Birmingham–Jefferson Convention Complex; Birmingham, Alabama		Rodger Bumpass, Alejandra Cazares, Jillian Coglan, Samurai Dan Coglan, Justin Cook, Grey DeLisle, Jack DeSena, Caitlin Glass, Olivia Hack, Haenuli, Yaya Han, Richard Horvitz, Samantha Inoue-Harte, Catherine Jones, Kazha, Peter Kelamis, Jennie Kwan, Amanda "AmaLee" Lee, The Living Tombstone, Jamie Marchi, Brandon McInnis, Michaela Jill Murphy, OR3O, Aaron Pabon, Kyle Phillips, Synth Reality Productions, J. Michael Tatum, TeddyLoid, Eric Vale, Natalie Van Sistine, and Vitamin H Productions.
February 9-11, 2024	Birmingham–Jefferson Convention Complex; Birmingham, Alabama		Greg Baldwin, Greg Cipes, Kellen Goff, Kyle Hebert, Catherine Jones, Kazha, Michael Kovach, James Landino, Ashley Nichols, Chris Niosi, Aaron Pabon, Khary Payton, Zeno Robinson, Keith Silverstein, Synth Reality Productions, Kirk Thornton, and Kari Wahlgren.
February 7-9, 2025	Birmingham–Jefferson Convention Complex; Birmingham, Alabama		Bryson Baugus, A.J. Beckles, Tracy J. Butler, Samurai Dan Coglan, Lizzie Freeman, Karen Fukuhara, Samantha Inoue-Harte, Catherine Jones, Takanashi Kiara, Lex Lang, PAiDA, Atelier Pierrot, Anairis Quiñones, Mallorie Rodak, Brandon Rogers, Saberspark, Synth Reality Productions, Abby Trott, Vitamin H Productions, Hynden Walch, Matthew Waterson, and Suzie Yeung.
February 6-8, 2026	Birmingham–Jefferson Convention Complex; Birmingham, Alabama		Tia Ballard, Justin Cook, Scott Dreier, Ryan Drummond, Samantha Inoue-Harte, Neil Kaplan, Brittney Karbowski, Kazha, Michael Kovach, Haruka Kurebayashi, Michaela Laws, Emi Lo, Lee Majdoub, Trina Nishimura, Zeno Robinson, Alex Rochon, Michelle Ruff, Jonah Scott, Spirit Bomb, Synth Reality Productions, Kaiji Tang, Dana Terrace, and The Triforce Quartet.

== Mascots ==
The official mascots of Kami-Con are Shio-chan (light/shiny) and Kosho (dark), who battled with the help of convention attendees choosing sides and participating in contests, to decide 2011's mascot. In 2013, Shio and Kosho battled with the new turtle mascot, Shoyu, and its previous evil owners.

== Mississippi Anime Invasion ==
The Mississippi Anime Invasion was a two-day anime convention held during October at the Oxford Conference Center in Oxford, Mississippi. It was created by Kami-Con and students from the University of Mississippi.

=== Event history ===
Dates	Location	Atten.	Guests
September 14–15, 2013	Oxford Conference Center; Oxford, Mississippi		Kyle Hebert, Laugh Out Loud, Micah Solusod, Greg Wicker, and Apphia Yu (Ayu Sakata).
October 25–26, 2014	Oxford Conference Center; Oxford, Mississippi		Laugh Out Loud, Bryce Papenbrook, Christopher Sabat, and Greg Wicker.

== Kami-Con HAI ==
Kami-Con HAI was a three-day anime convention held during summer/fall at the Von Braun Center in Huntsville, Alabama. The event did not return after 2025 due to poor attendance.

=== Event history ===
Dates	Location	Atten.	Guests
September 29 - October 1, 2023	Von Braun Center; Huntsville, Alabama		Linda Ballantyne, Dante Basco, Ian James Corlett, Katie Griffin, Richard Horvitz, Caleb Hyles, Kazha, The Living Tombstone, Alejandro Saab, Synth Reality Productions, Vitamin H Productions, Jonathan Young, and Stephanie Young.
October 4-6, 2024	Von Braun Center; Huntsville, Alabama		Alistair Abell, Samantha Béart, Britt Baron, Grey DeLisle Griffin, Barbara Dunkelman, Kara Eberle, Ricco Fajardo, Sandy Fox, Megan Hollingshead, Lindsay Jones, Kazha, Brianna Knickerbocker, Wendee Lee, Emi Lo, Matt Riddle, Synth Reality Productions, Briana White, and Arryn Zech.
July 25-27, 2025	Von Braun Center; Huntsville, Alabama		Nick Apostolides, Rodger Bumpass, Luci Christian, Greg Chun, Amber Lee Connors, Barbara Goodson, Kathleen Herles, Caleb Hyles, Kazha, Michele Knotz, Jason Marsden, Risa Mei, Jason Narvy, Paul Schrier, Rikki Simons, Ian Sinclair, Micah Solusod, Vitamin H Productions, Tavisha Wolfgarth-Simons, and Jonathan Young.

== Gallery ==
KamiCon 2009 logo.
