= Takanashi Kiara =

Hololive English-speaking VTuber and singer

- Takanashi Kiara as designed by Huke
- Born: Austria
- Occupation: VTuber

YouTube information
- Channel: Takanashi Kiara Ch. hololive-EN
- Years active: 2020–present
- Subscribers: 1.63 million
- Views: 319 million
- Last updated: April 23, 2026
- Website: hololive.hololivepro.com/en/talents/takanashi-kiara/

Takanashi Kiara (Japanese: 小鳥遊キアラ) is an Austrian VTuber and singer affiliated with Hololive Production. She debuted as part of Hololive English's first generation "Myth" on September 12, 2020. She is a livestreamer who primarily broadcasts video game-related content alongside other content, such as a talk show. As a singer, Takanashi has released multiple singles and two albums, Point of View and Vogelfrei. She has amassed 1.6 million subscribers as of December 2025.

== Overview ==
Takanashi's fictional lore describes her as a phoenix, stressing that she is not a chicken or turkey. In her lore, she is described as an idol who dreams of owning a fast food chain. Her design consists of orange hair with green-blue highlights, purple eyes, and wields a sword and shield.

She is one of the five members of Hololive English Myth, alongside Mori Calliope, Ninomae Ina'nis, Gawr Gura, and Amelia Watson. Her character was designed by Huke (stylized in lowercase), illustrator of Steins;Gate and creator of Black Rock Shooter. She streams in English, Japanese, and German. Myth members' livestreams on YouTube consist of them playing video games, singing karaoke, and talking with chat, among other activities. Some of the video games she has played are Stellar Blade and Inscryption. Takanashi's fans are called "Kiara Fried Phoenix" (KFP).

== Early life ==
Takanashi was born in Austria and her native language is German. Prior to becoming a VTuber, Takanashi had expressed an interest in Japanese media and culture from an early age after being gifted a German-localised volume of the manga Sugar Sugar Rune and a copy of Tales of Symphonia for the GameCube from family members. These led to her developing a passion for reading manga and playing the Tales series of games, the latter of which channelled her desire to learn to draw in an anime-manga style so she could draw characters from Symphonia. Takanashi has stated from this "[she] fell deeper and deeper into the rabbit hole that was Japanese pop culture".

Takanashi first became aware of the concept of VTubers and Hololive after encountering the YouTube channel of Hololive Generation 1 member Shirakami Fubuki. In 2020, she planned to live in Japan for a year on a working holiday visa. She had previously lived in Japan and was already fluent in Japanese, but had only ever lived in the Kantō or Kansai regions and planned to explore more of the country. However, the COVID-19 pandemic soon started and seriously hindered her plans and ability to travel around Japan. Takanashi began to feel significantly frustrated and upset as she felt that she wasted the visa due to it being a once in a lifetime use and couldn't be extended or paused, feeling that she had a lot of time on her hands but unable to do anything with it. During this time, she became hooked on the YouTube channel of Generation 3 member Usada Pekora, binging all of her streams. Hololive soon began conducting auditions for a new English branch and she decided to apply as she believed herself to be an ideal candidate; she stated in an interview that it "felt like destiny".

== Career ==
Takanashi Kiara made her debut on September 12, 2020, alongside other members of Myth. On December 9, 2020, Takanashi's YouTube channel was terminated. She expressed confusion at the termination and said that her channel had never received a copyright strike or been demonetized. Her channel was restored later that day. Takanashi reached 1 million subscribers on YouTube on May 30, 2021, the last member of Myth to do so. As of July 2025, Takanashi's channel has more than 1,400 livestreams and videos. Takanashi won the Miss Vtuber award at the 2024 Vtuber Awards, which was for the "Vtuber whose fashion sense is as trendy as their content".

On November 26, 2020 – Thanksgiving in the United States – Takanashi released her first single, "Hinotori". The cover art of the song was drawn by Huke. Takanashi's debut album, Point of View, released on August 30, 2023. In August 2024, Takanashi performed at Hololive's Breaking Dimensions concert, hosted at a sold-out Kings Theatre. Described as a "glamerous popstar" who did a "commanding solo", Ana Diaz of Polygon described the song she sang as "a cute little pop romance song" and mentioned how her performance featured a scene where it rained pineapples. During the concert, attendees waved orange glowsticks and chanted "Kiara", and one had an Austrian flag with Takanashi printed on. Takanashi's second album, Vogelfrei, released on February 8, 2026. On top of the Hololive English concert at Kings Theatre, Takanashi has performed at several other group concerts. Her first non-group concert, Drawn to Dawn – a collaboration with Ninomae – was held at Wiltern Theatre from March 27–28, 2026.

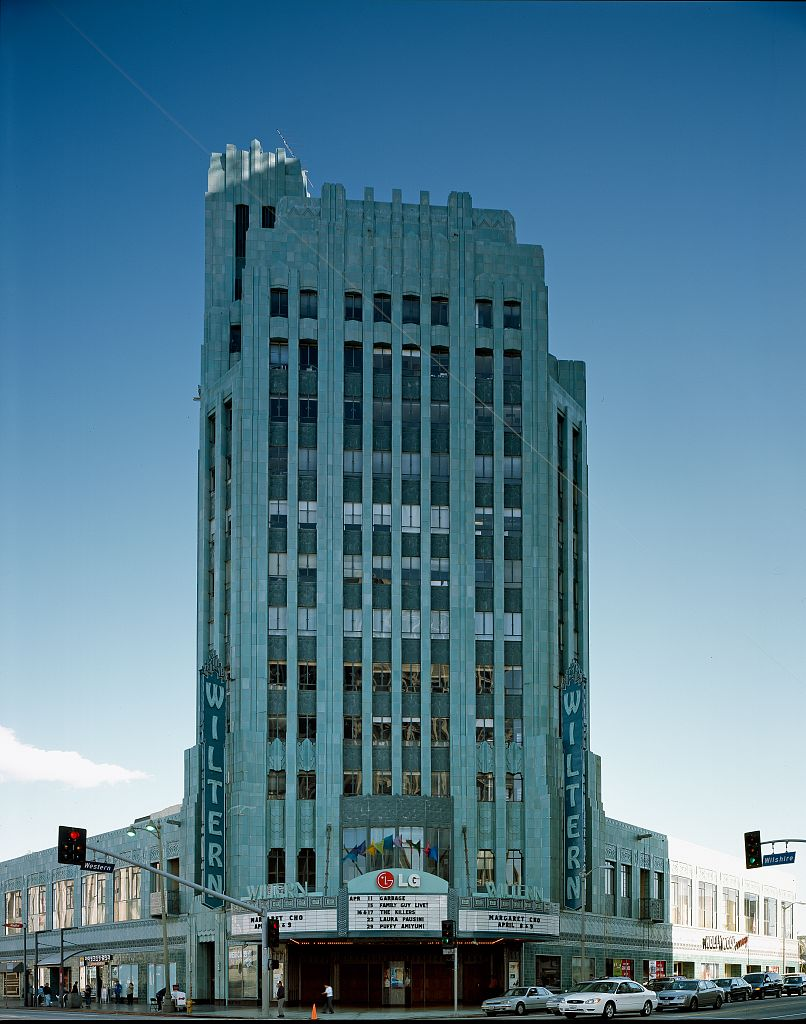
The Drawn to Dawn concert was held at the Wiltern Theatre

Takanashi has spoken about her intentions to participate in the Eurovision Song Contest. She applied to join the 2023 edition of the contest as the representative for Germany with her song "Do U". She later revealed she was rejected, commenting "The world wasn't ready for it. Cowards". She made another attempt to join the 2024 edition. The date songs had to be released after to be eligible came shortly after Point of View released; Takanashi initially assumed she would be unable to apply but was able to quickly record and develop a song, which she compared to Blackpink's discography. She speculated that her chances of being accepted were low, speculating that German organizer Norddeutscher Rundfunk may not trust using her avatar on-stage, may be unable to conceive how to use her avatar on-stage, and may dislike her song. In a 2025 interview with Siliconera, Takanashi revealed she was considering applying for the 2026 edition; she reiterated that she didn't think the contest was ready to handle VTubers due to the technical logistics, but believed that it would "make for some interesting headlines for them and for us".

Takanashi hosts a talk show, Holotalk, where she interviews other Hololive talents. Takanashi educates her mostly English-speaking audience about Japanese idol culture and talks about the intricacies of VTubing on the talk show. Holotalk has also evolved to offer 'graduating' (Note: Japanese idol terminology for retirement that is common in VTuber spaces.) VTubers a place to have a final word.

In August and September 2021, she appeared at MegaCon, Fan Expo Boston, and Calgary Expo as part of Hololive English's North American tour. She also appeared at Youmacon in October 2021. In December 2023, she appeared at Anime Frontier as a guest. She appeared at Anime NYC in August 2024. In February 2025, she appeared at Kami-Con. She appeared at DreamHack Atlanta in October 2025, judging a costume contest with Dwight Howard. She has also appeared at the German convention DoKomi.

In July 2021, Takanashi was made a brand ambassador for Bandai Namco's video game Tales of Arise. Her responsibilities included marketing and announcing information about the game leading up to its release. In an interview with TheGamer, the game's co-producer, Yusuke Tomizawa, revealed that she was chosen by an American marketer to be the English ambassador for the game due to her love of the series and large audience, with Tomizawa stating that he thought "it was a really good idea since they create a really warm, welcoming environment for fans to communicate in and the reaction has been so positive." TheGamer evaluated the collaboration to be a success. Takanashi also received a costume for her livestreams based on fantasy armor, designed by Arise artist SWAV.

== Artistry ==
Katie Gill of Anime Feminist described Takanashi's posting of meme videos and penchant for rickrolling as straying away from the traditional idol aesthetic. In a 2022 interview with Crunchyroll News, Takanashi said that she does not see herself as an idol. Ana Diaz of Polygon noted the contrast between Takanashi's laid-back behavior while playing video games, where she can matter-of-factly state "I have diarrhea", and the "glamorous popstar" who performed at Kings Theatre.

In a 2023 interview with Billboard Japan, Takanashi said that she listened to the Black Eyed Peas, Paramore, and Kelly Clarkson. She cited Paramore as an inspiration for her song "Retrospective". In a 2024 interview with Polygon, Takanashi said that she has strived to make her songs and performances more K-pop-like since her third single "Sparks". In a 2025 interview, Takanashi called NewJeans, Chung Ha, and Katseye influences. Teddy Cambosa of Anime Corner applauded the combination of synthwave and pop in her fourth single "Fever Night", calling it a "brilliant move".

== Activity ==
Year	Title	Ref.
2022	Valkyrie Connect	
2022	CounterSide Global	
2023	World of Warships	
2024	Earth Defense Force 6	

== Discography ==
=== Studio albums ===
Title	Album details	Peak chart positions			Sales
Title	Album details	JPN Dig.	JPN DL	JPN Sales	Sales
Point of View	Released: August 30, 2023; Label: Cover Corp; Formats: CD, digital download, streaming	44	55	—	JPN: 108 (digital)
Vogelfrei	Released: February 8, 2026; Label: Cover Corp; Formats: CD, digital download, streaming, LP	—	—	54	
"—" denotes releases that did not chart.

=== Singles ===
==== As lead artist ====
Title	Year	Album
"Hinotori"	2020	Point of View
"Heart Challenger"	2021	Point of View
"Sparks"	2021	Point of View
"Fever Night"	2022	Point of View
"Do U"	2022	Point of View
"Fire N Ice" (featuring Mori Calliope)	2023	Non-album single
"Chimera"	2024	Vogelfrei
"Mirage"	2024	Vogelfrei
"Perfume"	2025	Vogelfrei
"Tasty"	2025	Vogelfrei
"Glow in the Dark" (with La+ Darknesss)	2025	Non-album single

==== As featured artist ====
Title	Year	Peak chart positions	Sales	Album
Title	Year	KOR Album	Sales	Album
"Trauma" (Irisé featuring Takanashi Kiara)	2026	32	KOR: 2,571 (physical)	Non-album single
"—" denotes a recording that did not chart or was not released in that territory.

==== As collaborative artist ====
Title	Year	Peak chart positions	Album
Title	Year	JPN DL	Album
"Journey Like a Thousand Years" (as Hololive English -Myth-)	2022	—	Non-album singles
"Non-Fiction" (as Hololive English -Myth-)	2022	—	Non-album singles
"Connect the World" (as Hololive English)	2023	—	Non-album singles
"Holotori Dance!" (as Holotori)	2023	90	Non-album singles
"ReUnion" (as Hololive English -Myth-)	2024	—	Non-album singles
"Breaking Dimensions" (as Hololive English)	2024	—	Non-album singles
"The Show Goes On!" (as Hololive English -Myth-)	2024	—	Non-album singles
"Odyssey" (as Hololive English)	2024	—	Non-album singles
"We Go!" (ウィーゴー!) (with Hiroshi Kitadani, Hakos Baelz, and Kobo Kanaeru)	2025	—	Non-album singles
"We Go! (Hololive ver.)" (ウィーゴー!~hololive ver.~) (with Shirakami Fubuki, Houshou Marine, Tsunomaki Watame, Hakos Baelz, and Kobo Kanaeru)	2025	—	Non-album singles
"All For One" (as Hololive English)	2025	—	Non-album singles
"Kirameki Rider (English ver.)" (as Hololive English -Myth- and -Promise-)	2025	—	Non-album singles
"Fortune Spinner" (as Hololive English -Myth-)	2025	—	Non-album singles
"Freaky Deaky Love" (with Hakos Baelz, Koseki Bijou, and Raora Panthera)	2026	—	Non-album singles
"This is Myth" (as Hololive English -Myth-)	2026	—	Non-album singles
"—" denotes releases that did not chart.

== Awards and nominations ==
Ceremony	Year	Category	Result	Ref.
The Vtuber Awards	2023	Best Just Chatting / Zatsu Vtuber	Nominated	
The Vtuber Awards	2024	League of Their Own	Nominated	
The Vtuber Awards	2024	Miss Vtuber	Won	
