= Nijisanji =

Japanese virtual YouTuber talent agency

- Logo
- Trade name: NIJISANJI
- Native name: にじさんじ
- Romanized name: Nijisanji
- Industry: Virtual YouTubers; Livestreaming
- Founded: February 2018
- Parent: Anycolor Inc.
- Website: nijisanji.jp

Anycolor Inc.
- Formerly: Ichikara Inc.
- Type: Kabushiki-gaisha
- Traded as: TYO: 5032
- Industry: Entertainment; Virtual reality software
- Founded: 2 May 2017; 9 years ago
- Founder: Riku Tazumi
- Headquarters: Akasaka, Tokyo, Japan
- Key people: Riku Tazumi; (CEO & founder); Shinya Tsurui; (CFO); Takato Suzuki; (Executive Officer (YouTube Strategic and Media Produce Group)); Aki Iwakura; (Executive Officer (IP Marketing and Design Group)); Yosuke Kobayashi; (Executive Officer (VTuber Sales Group)); Masato Fujita; (Executive Officer (Engineering Group)); Yoshitaka Fumoto; (Executive Officer (Overseas VTuber Management Group))
- Total equity: ¥2,641,914,764 (2021)
- Owner: (as of 27 March 2023): Riku Tazumi (44.4%); Sony Music Entertainment Japan (5.47%); Yuzuru Honda (4.90%); Skyland Ventures KK (4.15%); Bilibili (3.56%)
- Subsidiaries: Atelier Colors
- Website: www.anycolor.co.jp/en

Nijisanji (にじさんじ; stylized in all caps as NIJISANJI) is a virtual YouTuber agency owned by Anycolor Inc. (formerly Ichikara Inc.). The agency was founded in 2018 with the purpose of promoting the use of Live2D models and live streaming as opposed to the 3D and clips format popularized by Kizuna AI.

== History ==
=== 2018 ===
On 11 January 2018, Ichikara Inc. announced that they were opening recruitment for virtual idols. The campaign centered around Ichikara's iPhone X face tracking app, also named Nijisanji. The app was designed to simplify the process of becoming a VTuber using Live2D software and the iPhone X's Animoji feature. The announcement stated that accepted talents, known as Virtual Livers, would be expected to stream live to various platforms using this app. The name Nijisanji was not used to refer to the talents themselves until the announcement of the second wave of recruitment on 15 March 2018.

On 17 July 2018, auditions were started for a Chinese branch in Shanghai and Taipei, and in cooperation with CAPSULE Inc., would recruit from each eight people for a total of sixteen Livers. The partnership with CAPSULE Inc. would end in March 2019, with Ichikara revoking its license. CAPSULE Inc. would spinoff what it maintained into VEgo. VEgo itself would go inactive by the end of March 2020.

=== 2019 ===
After the end of the original Chinese branch in cooperation with Bilibili, new Chinese auditions started in April 2019. From these, the jointly-operated "VirtuaReal Project" would emerge later in May.

In May, Ichikara also launched its "Nijisanji Network" service where it supported other content creators and affiliated companies through the use of Nijisanji management and support resources. They also announce the first and only participants of the program being Indie VTuber Fairys-chan and Tenkai Tsukasa. The service shut down on 31 December 2019 with all its participants continuing activities on their own.

In July, auditions began for an Indonesian branch of the agency, Nijisanji ID, which was launched in September. In November and December, auditions began for Indian and Korean branches respectively (Nijisanji IN and KR), each beginning activity in January 2020.

=== 2020 ===
In January 2020, Nijisanji officially opened the English version of its Twitter (now known as X) accounts, followed by an English YouTube account in June. As part of their attempt to appeal to the English-speaking audience, they also rebranded their Indian branch into a broader English branch (Nijisanji EN). However, in November, the three members of Nijisanji EN were returned to their original Nijisanji IN branch, while the audition for the only English-speaking talents was held in December. Nijisanji IN was eventually dissolved and all its members graduated on 30 April 2021.

In September 2020, Nijisanji created an "Aggressive Acts and Slander Countermeasure Team" to offer counselling to victims of harassment and take legal measures against perpetrators of harassment, specifically the online harassment plaguing the Japanese entertainment industry. This announcement came in the wake of Hololive VTuber Mano Aloe's retirement after only two weeks of activity due to online harassment.

In October 2020, Nijisanji privated the various Among Us streams of its members after receiving a complaint by Masuoka, a programmer who made the popular Japanese translation mod of the game. Through a tweet, Masuoka specified that the reason for his complaint was that Nijisanji was using Masuoka's mod without properly crediting him. Nijisanji have since entered negotiation with him to properly credit and license his work.

On 19 October 2020, it was announced that Meiro Kingyozaka had been terminated for breach of contract. This followed the posting of a leaked video by an external VTuber containing information only Kingyozaka herself could have known, leading to the conclusion that a leak had occurred. On October 21, Nijisanji's official Twitter account disclosed the circumstances leading to the termination.

On 1 December, Ichikara Inc. announced the official launch of Nijisanji's first-wave auditions for English-speaking countries. The audition period lasted until 15 December.

=== 2021 ===
Nijisanji EN debuted its first wave on 16 May 2021 dubbed "LazuLight". It consisted of three female Livers: Elira Pendora, Pomu Rainpuff, and Finana Ryugu. A simultaneous commentary livestream on their English channel, hosted by Nijisanji ID members Hana Macchia and Bonnivier Pranaja, was also held. It was followed by OBSYDIA in July and Ethyria in October.

On 17 May 2021, Ichikara officially renamed itself to Anycolor.

In June, Anycolor would announce a talent training initiative known as "Virtual Talent Academy". Its first auditions would be held on 18 June 2021, who would begin training starting from November. Upon completion, the graduate may be given the offer to debut in Nijisanji or freely move to other agencies to try to audition to them.

On 21 October 2021, Anycolor launched ROF-MAO (Rofumao (ろふまお); stylized in all caps), a virtual unit of four Livers: Kagami Hayato, Kenmochi Toya, Fuwa Minato, and Kaida Haru. The unit's name comes from portmanteau of two internet slangs: ROFL and LMAO. The unit formation were announced through Nijisanji official YouTube channel.

On 12 December 2021, the fourth wave of Nijisanji EN VTubers debuted, called "Luxiem". It was made up of five male Livers: Luca Kaneshiro, Shu Yamino, Ike Eveland, Mysta Rias, and Vox Akuma. A debut program was hosted by Elira Pendora and Oliver Evans. Luxiem marked the debut of the first English-speaking male talent wave from a big VTuber agency.

=== 2022 ===
On 17 February 2022, Anycolor announced the merger of Nijisanji ID and Nijisanji KR into the main Nijisanji branch starting on 15 April 2022. As part of the merger, the official social media accounts of the two branches would cease operation and the ongoing audition for their latest generation for both would be cancelled.

It was later announced that Nijisanji's VTubers would collaborate with Japanese singer Yuya Tegoshi.

On 8 June 2022, Anycolor publicly listed on the Tokyo Stock Exchange, opening at ¥4,810 per share. By 18 October 2022, the company was estimated to be worth over US$2.5 billion, with founder Riku Tazumi's 45% share netting him a personal wealth of roughly US$1.1 billion, making him Japan's youngest billionaire.

On 13 July 2022, Anycolor announced the next wave of Virtual Talent Academy graduates to debut directly into Nijisanji. The new wave, "Voltaction", began their activities on 16 July 2022.

On 24 July 2022, Iluna, the sixth wave of Nijisanji EN, debuted. The first English-speaking, mixed-gender wave to debut, Iluna included Maria Marionette, Kyo Kaneko, Aia Amare, Aster Arcadia, Scarle Yonaguni, and Ren Zotto.

On 9 December 2022, XSOLEIL, the seventh wave of Nijisanji EN, debuted. This was the second English-speaking, mixed-gender wave to debut, and included Doppio Dropscythe, Meloco Kyoran, Hex Haywire, Kotoka Torahime, Ver Vermillion, and Zaion LanZa.

=== 2023 ===
On 23 January 2023, Nijisanji announced AR Live "Colors," a concert featuring the members of the LazuLight, Obsidiya, Ethyria, Luxiem and Noctyx, waves. The event was split into two parts, Pastel Stage and Vivid Stage. Pastel Stage would feature Finana Ryugu, Pomu Rainpuff, Elira Pendora, Rosemi Lovelock, Selen Tatsuki, Petra Gurin, Enna Alouette, Nina Kosaka, Reimu Endō, and Millie Parfait, and Vivid Stage Luca Kaneshiro, Vox Akuma, Shu Yamino, Mysta Rias, Ike Eveland, Sonny Brisko, Fulgur Ovid, Alban Knox, and Uki Violeta. The parts were set to air at 12:00 JST on 8 April and 9 April, respectively. However, the event was canceled on 2 February due to delays caused by COVID-19 pandemic.

On 10 March 2023, Anycolor terminated Nijisanji EN Liver Zaion LanZa of XSOLEIL, citing multiple violations of her contract and rules set out by the agency, including copyright infringement and making "offensive remarks regarding discrimination and sexual assault". However, many of the allegations were disputed in a document released by VTuber Sayu Sincronisity.

On 23 March 2023, Nijisanji temporarily suspended Gundo Mirei after she posted a baseball-related tweet that offended Japanese baseball fans pushing Anycolor to suspend her. Mirei was tweeting her reaction to the ongoing WBC (World Baseball Classic). In a tweet thread she voiced her misunderstandings about baseball and made seemingly sarcastic jokes and comments about how baseball could be improved. Since her suspension, Mirei Gundo had not posted on social media or streamed. She eventually announced her graduation on 21 June 2023.

On 24 June 2023, Krisis, the eighth wave of Nijisanji EN, debuted. A male trio, this wave included Vezalius Bandage, Vantacrow Bringer, and Yu Q. Wilson.

On 21 October 2023, Nijisanji announced the graduation of Xia Ekavira, Mika Melatika, and Riksa Dhirendra. The talents, who were previously part of Nijisanji's Indonesia branch, are part of a growing list of former Nijisanji Indonesia talents graduating from the agency. Past graduations include ZEA Cornelia, Taka Radjiman, Siska Leontyne, Amicia Michella, Azura Cecillia, Nara Haramaung, Reza Avanluna, and Hyona Eliatora. All of these graduations have happened following the merge of the agency's Indonesian and Korean branches to the main Japanese branch. The three graduated on 17 November 2023, 28 December 2023, and 11 January 2024, respectively.

On 27 October 2023, TTT, the ninth wave of Nijisanji EN, debuted. This wave was formed of Kunai Nakasato, Victoria Brightshield and Claude Clawmark.

=== 2024 ===
On 29 March, Anycolor re-announced its AR Live concert, "Colors", after the event was initially cancelled in 2023. The event was held on 14 April with the concert featuring LazuLight, OBSYDIA, Ethyria, Luxiem, and Noctyx members.

On 26 April, the unit "Gakudan V!VO" (楽団V!VO) began their activities. Unlike previous vocal-based musical units, Gakudan V!VO is a chamber orchestra, consisting of pianist Suzuki Masaru, violinist Seraph Dazzlegarden, flutist Eli Conifer, cellist Emma★August, and trombonist Tachitsute Toto.

On 12 May, Nijisanji announced their first full 3D concert at Anime Expo which was to take place on 7 July. It was planned to feature Elira Pendora, Finana Ryugu, Petra Gurin, Rosemi Lovelock, and Millie Parfait who would have performed in the first program, followed by evening performances by Luca Kaneshiro, Shu Yamino, Sonny Brisko, and Uki Violeta. This was cancelled on 26 June alongside their planned "Summer Jam" festival.

The tenth generation of Nijisanji EN, Denauth, was announced on 21 May, with the group debuting on 25 May. The group consists of three members: Ryoma Barrenwort, Twisty Amanozako, and Klara Charmwood.

On 9 November, Nijisanji announced the 7th Anniversary Live "Overture" concert, split into a Daytime Stage and Nighttime Stage. The Daytime Stage was the first 3D concert for the EN branch held live rather than pre-recorded, and featured Elira Pendora, Rosemi Lovelock, Enna Alouette, Vox Akuma, Ike Eveland, Sonny Brisko, Maria Marionette, and Ren Zotto. The event was held on 24 February during the 7th Anniversary Festival.

=== 2025 ===
In January 2025, Anycolor announced the opening of its studio expansion, tripling its filming and distribution capacity as well as improving its motion-capture technologies. In an interview, ANYCOLOR Executive Director, Fujita Masato, and Director of 3D Studios, Takagi Daisuke, revealed that the expanded studio now houses three 3D soundstages, four Live2D soundstages, one green-screen soundstage, and two recording studios. Two of the three 3D soundstages are equipped with the company's existing filming and motion-capture equipment, while the third 3D soundstage exclusively uses the Valkyrie VK26, one of the newest motion-capture cameras at the time. Anycolor's FY2025 financial report — published in June 2025 — revealed that the company invested ¥2.1 billion in the studio expansion, with unspecified additional expenditures spent on platform tooling and 3D/Live2D improvements.

The eleventh generation of Nijisanji EN, BY THE BEAT, was announced on 12 March, with the group debuting on 15 March. The group consists of four members: Zeal Ginjoka, Freodore, Seible, and Kaelix Debonair.

On 11 June 2025, Anycolor published its FY2025.4 (fiscal year ending April 30, 2025) financial report. Total revenue climbed 34.0% YoY to ¥42.9 billion, operating profit rose 31.7% to ¥16.3 billion, and net profit increased 31.9% to ¥11.5 million. Noticeably, the report cited its Commerce and Event segments as the primary revenue drivers — a notable shift from past years where streaming revenues led revenue growth. While Nijisanji (JP) saw significant growth of +50% YoY in annual revenue, the report showed that the EN branch saw a revenue decline of 45.4% YoY, with quarterly revenue trending downwards throughout FY2025.

On 24 December 2025, Nijisanji Liver Suzuhara Lulu returned to the company and resumed streaming activities, four years after her initial departure from the company. This marked the first time a corporate VTuber has returned to a management company after a substantial period of graduation, garnering more than 269,000 concurrent viewers to her comeback stream as a result.

=== 2026 ===
On 6 January 2026, Anycolor began restoring public access to Nijisanji and Nijisanji EN videos that had previously been made private following the September 2024 legal proceedings related to the misconduct of an external creator known as YAB. Anycolor stated that the privatized content itself bore no wrongdoing and that the decision to restore them was prompted by requests from fans and the VTubers involved. Anycolor confirmed that legal proceedings against YAB remain ongoing, with several cases having already received court orders for the disclosure of sender information.

In collaboration with Sony Music Solutions, Anycolor launched the "Niji Store Voice App" for iOS and Android systems on 30 March 2026, providing a dedicated, free platform for managing and listening to purchased Nijisanji voice content.

On 1 April 2026, Anycolor announced a collaboration with Universal Music Japan. In their press release, they stated that they aim to train the BY THE BEAT wave for a major label debut scheduled for 2027. The group released their first single, "Double Vision" on the same date. Their second single, "MERORI", was released in English on 31 July and Japanese on 5 August.

On 23 April 2026, Nijisanji debuted the "Y4T4" unit, adding 8 new Livers to its Japanese roster. Most notably, in the official announcement of the unit's debut, Nijisanji stated that Y4T4's debut streams would be broadcast simultaneously on Twitch and YouTube and that Twitch would be the unit's primary streaming platform, marking Nijisanji's first major push into Twitch.

On 1 May 2026, Nijisanji EN announced the launch of the "Chaotic Charisma VTuber Auditions."

On 26 May 2026, Nijisanji announced that Kenmochi Toya would conclude his activities in ROF-MAO on May 28th, with the remaining three members suspending group activities on the same date. In a subsequent livestream, Kenmochi explained his desire to avoid his personal commitments becoming an obstacle to the group's development as his reasons for departing.

On 15 August 2026, Nijisanji liver Tsumugi Kataribe returned to streaming after more than seven years of absence without any public broadcast or social media post, and only three livestreams done on her channel.

== Members (Livers) ==
Nijisanji members are called Virtual Livers or Livers, a portmanteau of "live streamers", and mainly stream on YouTube. Typical activities involve playing video games, singing or chatting with the audience. Over time, some Livers might get merchandise such as Nendoroid, pin-back buttons, acrylic stands, special voice packs, signed cards and more for anniversaries or special events.

Below are all current and former Livers associated with Nijisanji.

=== Nijisanji (Japan) ===
Generation 1

- Tsukino Mito [ja] (月ノ美兎)
- Shibuya Hajime (渋谷ハジメ)
- Higuchi Kaede [ja] (樋口楓)
- Shizuka Rin [ja] (静凛)
- Moira (モイラ)
- Elu (える)

Generation 2

- Ienaga Mugi (家長むぎ)
- Mononobe Alice [ja] (物述有栖)
- Kenmochi Toya [ja] (剣持刀也)
- Morinaka Kazaki (森中花咲)
- Fushimi Gaku (伏見ガク)
- Gilzaren III (ギルザレン)
- Fumino Tamaki (文野環)
- Ushimi Ichigo (宇志海いちご)
- Yuhi Riri (夕陽リリ)

==== Nijisanji Gamers ====
Nijisanji Gamers was a group of Virtual Livers that specialized in gaming content. Originally managed as a separate branch, it was later dissolved and merged into the main Nijisanji group in December 2018. Post-merge, these Livers are also known as Ex-Gamers.

- Kanae [ja] (叶)
- Akabane Youko (赤羽葉子)
- Sasaki Saku [ja] (笹木咲)
- Honma Himawari [ja] (本間ひまわり)
- Makaino Ririmu (魔界ノりりむ)
- Kuzuha (葛葉)
- Shiina Yuika [ja] (椎名唯華)

==== Nijisanji SEEDs ====
Nijisanji SEEDs was a Virtual Liver group themed around "living in the virtual world". Originally managed as a separate branch, it was later dissolved and merged into the main Nijisanji group in December 2018. Post-merge, these Livers are also known as Ex-SEEDs.

Generation 1

- Dola (ドーラ)
- Hanabatake Chaika [ja] (花畑チャイカ)
- Ryushen [ja] (緑仙)
- Sister Claire (シスター・クレア)
- Suzuki Masaru (鈴木勝)
- Todoroki Kyoko (轟京子)
- Uzuki Kou [ja] (卯月コウ)
- Yashiro Kizuku [ja] (社築)

Generation 2

- Harusaki Air (春崎エアル)
- Kanda Shoichi (神田笑一)
- Amemori Sayo (雨森小夜)
- Takamiya Rion [ja] (鷹宮リオン)
- Asuka Hina (飛鳥ひな)
- Maimoto Keisuke (舞元啓介)
- Debidebi Debiru [ja] (でびでび・でびる)
- Rindou Mikoto (竜胆尊)
- Joe Rikiichi [ja] (ジョー・力一)
- Machita Chima [ja] (町田ちま)
- Sakura Ritsuki (桜凛月)
- Belmond Banderas (ベルモンド・バンデラス)
- Yaguruma Rine (矢車りね)
- Yumeoi Kakeru [ja] (夢追翔)
- Kuroi Shiba (黒井しば)

==== Post-2018 merger ====
At the end of 2018, Nijisanji, Nijisanji Gamers, and Nijisanji SEEDs were all merged into a single Japanese branch named Nijisanji. Post-merger, new Japanese debut groups are not identified by number. Prior to 2022, most debut groups were named by the Livers themselves after debuting.

Usa-chan Club

- Yuzuki Roa (夢月ロア)^{Hiatus since 21 October 2020}

28 January Debut

- Kataribe Tsumugu (語部紡)

Sanbaka

- Inui Toko [ja] (戌亥とこ)
- Ange Katrina [ja] (アンジュ・カトリーナ)
- Lize Helesta [ja] (リゼ・ヘルエスタ)

Beni Zuwaigani

- Saegusa Akina [ja] (三枝明那)
- Aizono Manami (愛園愛美)

MahiLulu

- Yukishiro Mahiro (雪城眞尋)
- Suzuhara Lulu [ja] (鈴原るる)

LvEx

- Ex Albio (エクス・アルビオ)
- Levi Elipha (レヴィ・エリファ)

Majomarity

- Hayama Marin (葉山舞鈴)
- Nui Sociere (ニュイ・ソシエール)

SMC-gumi

- Hakase Fuyuki (葉加瀬冬雪)
- Yorumi Rena (夜見れな)
- Kagami Hayato [ja] (加賀美ハヤト)

Blues

- Ars Almal (アルス・アルマル)

Posanke

- Amamiya Kokoro (天宮こころ)
- Eli Conifer (エリー・コニファー)
- Ratna Petit (ラトナ・プティ)

Tulip-gumi

- Sukoya Kana [ja] (健屋花那)
- Hayase Sou (早瀬走)
- Shellin Burgundy (シェリン・バーガンディ)

Orihimeboshi

- Fumi (フミ)
- Yamagami Karuta (山神カルタ)
- Hoshikawa Sara [ja] (星川サラ)

Aka no Soshiki

- Emma August (えま★おうがすと)
- Luis Cammy (ルイス・キャミー)
- Matsukai Mao (魔使マオ)

Night Kingdom

- Shirayuki Tomoe (白雪巴)
- Fuwa Minato (不破湊)

Mananatsu

- Kurusu Natsume [ja] (来栖夏芽)
- Mashiro Mome (ましろ爻)

Meifu

- Furen E Lustario (フレン・E・ルスタリオ)
- Ibrahim (イブラヒム)

VΔLZ

- Genzuki Tojiro (弦月藤士郎)
- Nagao Kei (長尾景)
- Kaida Haru [ja] (甲斐田晴)

Kiramero

- Sorahoshi Kirame (空星きらめ)

Selene Drama Club

- Suo Sango [ja] (周央サンゴ)
- Kitakoji Hisui (北小路ヒスイ)
- Todo Kohaku (東堂コハク)
- Nishizono Chigusa (西園チグサ)

Eden-gumi

- Lauren Iroas (ローレン・イロアス)
- Leos Vincent (レオス・ヴィンセント)
- Oliver Evans (オリバー・エバンス)
- Lain Paterson (レイン・パターソン)

Ranunculus

- Umise Yotsuha (海妹四葉)
- Amagase Muyu (天ヶ瀬むゆ)
- Ponto Nei (先斗寧)

==== Nijisanji ID ====
Previously Nijisanji's Indonesian branch, consisting of Indonesian-speaking Livers and aimed at Indonesian audiences. Originally operating as a separate branch, it was merged into the main Nijisanji branch on 15 April 2022. Post-merge, these Livers are also known as Ex-IDs.

First Wave

- Hana Macchia (ハナ・マキア)

Second Wave

- Rai Galilei (ライ・ガリレイ)

Third Wave

- Layla Alstroemeria (ライラ・アルストロエメリア)

Fourth Wave

- Etna Crimson (エトナ・クリムソン)

Fifth Wave

- Nagisa Arcinia (ナギサ・アルシニア)
- Derem Kado (デレム・カド)

==== Nijisanji KR ====
Previously Nijisanji's South Korean branch, consisting of Korean-speaking Livers and aimed at South Korean audiences. Originally operating as a separate branch, it was merged into the main NIJISANJI branch on 15 April 2022. Post-merge, these Livers are also known as Ex-KRs.

First Wave

- Min Suha (민수하)
- Gaon (가온)

Second Wave

- So Nagi (소나기)

Third Wave

- Lee Roha (이로하)
- Akira Ray (아키라 레이)

Fourth Wave

- Yang Nari (양나리)
- Ryu Hari (류하리)
- Oh Jiyu (오지유)

Fifth Wave

- Seffyna (세피나)

Sixth Wave

- Na Sera (나세라)
- Ha Yun (하윤)

==== Post-2022 merger ====
Below is the list of Nijisanji Livers who debuted after Nijisanji ID and Nijisanji KR merged into the main branch.

Solo Debut

- Hyakumantenbara Salome [ja] (壱百満天原サロメ)

VOLTACTION

- Fura Kanato (風楽奏斗)
- Watarai Hibari (渡会雲雀)
- Shikinagi Akira (四季凪アキラ)
- Seraph Dazzlegarden (セラフ・ダズルガーデン)

Idios

- Igarashi Rika (五十嵐梨花)
- Koshimizu Toru (小清水透)
- Ishigami Nozomi (石神のぞみ)
- Sophia Valentine (ソフィア・ヴァレンタイン)
- Kuramochi Meruto (倉持めると)
- Kaburaki Roco (鏑木ろこ)
- Shishido Akari (獅子堂あかり)

Oriens

- Akagi Wen (赤城ウェン)
- Usami Rito (宇佐美リト)
- Hibachi Mana (緋八マナ)
- Saiki Ittetsu (佐伯イッテツ)

Dytica

- Murakumo Kagetsu (叢雲カゲツ)
- Hoshirube Sho (星導ショウ)
- Koyanagi Rou (小柳ロウ)
- Inami Rai (伊波ライ)

Mitarashi-dan

- Tachitsute Toto (立伝都々)
- Shioriha Ruri (栞葉るり)
- Milan Kestrel (ミラン・ケストレル)

3SKM

- Kitami Yusei (北見遊征)
- Kaisei (魁星)
- Sasaki Ness (榊ネス)

Ayakaki

- Shiga Riko (司賀りこ)
- Tamanoi Nana (珠乃井ナナ)
- Kisara (綺沙良)
- Kozue Mone (梢桃音)
- Lunlun [ja] (ルンルン)

Speciale

- Nanase Suzuna (七瀬すず菜)
- Saotome Berry (早乙女 ベリー)
- Kirara Tamako (雲母たまこ)
- Sakayori Soma (酒寄颯馬)
- Nagisa Trout (渚トラウト)

Eriburi

- Hitotsubashi Ayato (一橋綾人)
- Itsuki Sakyo (五木左京)

Yoiyume

- Kadou Mikaru [ja] (蝸堂みかる)
- Yagyu Shino (夜牛詩乃)
- Togawa Nonoha (十河ののは)
- Nekoyashiki Miku (猫屋敷美紅)

Splare

- Sumeragi Reo (皇れお)
- Shinomiya Yuno (篠宮ゆの)
- Shirose Isumi (城瀬いすみ)
- Hanakago Tsubasa (花籠つばさ)

Umyami

- Shirasa Ayane [ja] (白砂あやね)
- Minamo Madoka [ja] (水面まどか)

Y4T4

- Onotora (男虎)
- Kuri Eita (九里詠太)
- Kokonami Iruka (小々波いるか)
- Senri Ayumu (千凛あゆむ)
- Tsukahara Daichi (塚原大地)
- Mikogami Kotone (御子神琴音)
- Rei7 (れいな)
- Rayon (レヨン)

Poppun Parlor

- Purin Lala Mode (ぷりん・らら・もーど)
- Pomelo Punch (ぽめろ・ぱんち)

RhyZyGy

- Kaminaga Taiga (神永タイガ)
- Yamada Ryuichiro (山田龍一郎)

=== Nijisanji EN ===
LazuLight

- Elira Pendora (エリーラ ペンドラ)
- Finana Ryugu (フィナーナ 竜宮)

OBSYDIA

- Petra Gurin (ペトラ グリン)

Ethyria

- Millie Parfait (ミリー・パフェ)
- Enna Alouette (エナー・アールウェット)

Luxiem

- Luca Kaneshiro (ルカ・カネシロ)
- Shu Yamino (闇ノシュウ)
- Vox Akuma (ヴォックス・アクマ)

Noctyx

- Sonny Brisko (サニー・ブリスコー)
- Uki Violeta (浮奇ヴィオレタ)
- Alban Knox (アルバーン・ノックス)

ILUNA

- Maria Marionette (マリア マリオネット)
- Aia Amare (アイア アマレ)
- Scarle Yonaguni (スカーレ ヨナグニ)
- Ren Zotto (レン ゾット)

XSOLEIL

- Doppio Dropscythe (ドッピオ ドロップサイト)
- Meloco Kyoran (狂蘭 メロコ)
- Ver Vermillion (ヴェール ヴァーミリオン)

Krisis

- Vezalius Bandage (ヴェザリウス バンデージ)
- Vantacrow Bringer (ベンタクロウ ブリンガー)
- Yu Q. Wilson (ユウ Q ウィルソン)

TTT

- Claude Clawmark (クロード クローマーク)

Denauth

- Ryoma Barrenwort (凉舞 バレンウォート)
- Klara Charmwood (クララ チャームウッド)

BY THE BEAT

- Zeal Ginjoka (ジール・ギンジョウカ)
- Freodore (フリオドール)
- Seible (セイブル)
- Kaelix Debonair (ケイリクス・デボネア)

=== Former Livers ===
Nijisanji

- Yuki Chihiro [ja] (勇気ちひろ)
- Suzuya Aki (鈴谷アキ)
- Suzuka Utako [ja] (鈴鹿詩子)
- Warabeda Meiji [ja] (童田明治)
- Kudou Chitose (久遠千歳)
- Gundo Mirei (郡道美玲)
- Seto Miyako (瀬戸美夜子)
- Shindo Raito (真堂雷斗)
- Otogibara Era [ja] (御伽原江良)
- Aiba Uiha (相羽ういは)
- Mayuzumi Kai [ja] (黛灰)
- Melissa Kinrenka (メリッサ・キンレンカ)
- Kingyozaka Meiro (金魚坂めいろ)
- Asahina Akane (朝日南アカネ)
- Axia Krone (アクシア・クローネ)
- Gwelu Os Gar (グウェル・オス・ガール)
- Naraka (奈羅花)
- Onomachi Haruka (小野町春香)

Nijisanji Gamers

- Yamiyono Moruru (闇夜乃モルル)
- Setsuna (雪汝)

Nijisanji SEEDs

- Azuchi Momo (安土桃)
- Nakao Azuma (名伽尾アズマ)
- Umiyashano Kami (海夜叉神)
- Hassaku Yuzu (八朔ゆず)
- Izumo Kasumi (出雲霞)
- Naruto Kogane (鳴門こがね)
- Tsukimi Shizuku (月見しずく)
- Achikita Chinami (遠北千南)
- Naruse Naru (成瀬鳴)

Nijisanji ID

- ZEA Cornelia (ゼア コルネリア)
- Taka Radjiman (タカ ラジマン)
- Amicia Michella (アミシア ミシェラ)
- Miyu Ottavia (ミユ オッタフィア)
- Riksa Dhirendra (リクサ ディレンドラ)
- Azura Cecillia (アズラ セシリア)
- Nara Haramaung (ナラ ハラマウン)
- Siska Leontyne (シスカ レオンタイン)
- Reza Avanluna (レザ アファンルナ)
- Hyona Elatiora (ヒョナ エラティオラ)
- Xia Ekavira (シア エカフィラ)
- Mika Melatika (ミカ メラティカ)
- Bonnivier Pranaja (ボンニフィエール プラナジャ)

Nijisanji KR

- Moarin (모아린)
- Lorou (로로)
- Hakuren (백연)
- Yu Ruri (유루리)
- Kaen (카엔)
- Wiffy (위피)
- Shin Yuya (신유야)
- Nun Bora (눈보라) [ja]
- Ko Yami (고야미)
- Lee Siu (이시우)
- Lee On (이온)
- Shin Kiru (신기루)
- Chae Ara (채아라)
- Han Chiho (한치호)
- Song Mia (송미아)
- Ban Hada (반하다)

Nijisanji EN

- Pomu Rainpuff (ぽむ れいんぱふ)
- Selen Tatsuki (セレン 龍月)
- Nina Kosaka (狐坂ニナ)
- Mysta Rias (ミスタ・リアス)
- Yugo Asuma (遊間ユーゴ)
- Kyo Kaneko (金子 鏡)
- Zaion Lanza (ランザー 罪恩)
- Hex Haywire (ヘックス へイワイヤー)
- Kunai Nakasato (中里苦無)
- Victoria Brightshield (ヴィクトリア ブライトシールド)
- Ike Eveland (アイク・イーヴランド)
- Fulgur Ovid (ファルガー・オーヴィド)
- Kotoka Torahime (虎姫 コトカ)
- Twisty Amanozako (トゥイスティー アマノザコ)
- Aster Arcadia (アスター アルカディア)
- Reimu Endou (遠藤霊夢)
- Rosemi Lovelock (ロゼミ ラブロック)

Nijisanji IN

- Aadya (アディア)
- Noor (ヌール)
- Vihaan (ビハン)

Nijisanji Shanghai

- Yingou (缨偶)
- Siddel (希德尔)
- Limaoshan (山小狸)
- Miyashita Mariko (宫下真梨子)
- Angie Fei (安琪·菲)
- Royuan-an (洛源安)
- Qing (青)
- Satania Liun Limse (塞塔尼亚)

Nijisanji Taipei

- Monmon (モンモン)
- Atles (アトルズ)
- Dailechi (黛樂琪)
- Chen Kuang-kuang (框框)
- Kobayakawa Nana (小早川奈々)
- Mifentan (糜粉棠)
- Siarurin (霞露凜)
- Talency (塔綾絲)

VOIZ

- Kurohane Kuroto (黒羽黒兎)
- Kaminari Poaro (神成ポアロ)

== Sub-Units ==
While most Nijisanji Livers debut in units, Nijisanji has also created officially-recognized sub-units, which are teams of Livers who routinely collaborate to create content and merchandise. Besides receiving official recognition, funding, and resources from the company, sub-units are commonly known for its shared lore, brand images, creative goals, and content styles among fans.

List of Nijisanji (JP) Sub-Units
Sub-Unit Name	Members	Year of Formation	Key Activities & Achievements
ChroNoiR	Kanae (叶); Kuzuha (葛葉)	2018	Weekly variety show "ChroNoiR is Up to Something," airing Wednesdays on the unit's YouTube channel; 2022 debut album "UP 2 YOU"; 2023 lore animation "ChroNoiR Episode 0"; 2024 album "Wonder Wander World"; 2025 "ChroNoiR is Up to Something at Budokan" live event @ Budokan
ROF-MAO	Kagami Hayato; Kenmochi Toya (departed); Fuwa Minato; Kaida Haru	2021	Weekly variety show "ROF-MAO Juku," airing Thursdays on the unit's YouTube channel; 2022 mini album "Crack Up!!!"; 2023 debut album "Overflow"; 2025 mini album "MOMENTUM"
Nornis	Inui Toko; Machita Chima; Asahina Akane (graduated)	2022 (ended 2026)	a music-oriented sub-unit focused on musical performances and production.; 2023 "Transparent Blue: Nornis 1st LIVE" concert @ Grand Cube Osaka; 2024 mini album "Tensegrity"; 2024 "Tensegrity: Nornis LIVE TOUR 2024" @ KT Zepp Yokohama, Zepp Namba (Osaka), SENDAI GIGS; 2025 "Concerto di luce: Nornis Orchestra Live" concert in collaboration with the Tokyo Philharmonic Orchestra

== Controversy ==
Doki 🏆
(@dokibird)
tweeted:

I will not be silenced anymore. On Dec, I was hospitalized for an attempt that was caused by a built up of bullying from within&being in a toxic&poor environment for numerous months that led to my breaking point. I requested to leave first but on more neutral terms on 26th Jan.

5 February 2024

On 5 February 2024, the company announced the termination of Nijisanji EN Liver Selen Tatsuki's contract, effective immediately, after she had been inactive online for over a month, citing breaches of contract, violations of internal rules, misleading statements on social media, and actions causing payment delays for commissions to fan creators. The company received backlash from inside and outside the VTuber community afterwards.

The contents of Selen Tatsuki's notice of termination sparked controversy online. Multiple creators who worked with her refuted the claim that Selen had delayed their payments, and some stated that Nijisanji's management was responsible for the delayed payments. The notice also accused Selen of posting a song cover without proper authorization, leading to management unpublishing the video until authorizations were confirmed. It was later stated that the video portion had not yet been approved due to the inclusion of former Nijisanji Livers. It is unclear as to what specific rights were required, however, as Nijisanji owns the intellectual property for their character designs.

The final statements posted on Selen's Twitter page before its protection stated that she had been hospitalized at the end of December 2023. Independent VTuber Dokibird, the alternate account of the creator behind Selen, later stated that her hospitalization was due to a suicide attempt caused by poor management and a toxic environment.

In response to the situation, several Nijisanji EN Livers, including Enna Alouette, Fulgur Ovid, Finana Ryugu, Uki Violeta, and Meloco Kyoran, announced that they would be taking a break from their social media accounts.

On 7 February Japanese time, Nijisanji released an investor relations statement claiming that the decision to terminate Selen Tatsuki would have a negligible effect on its finances. Yahoo! Finance users criticized Nijisanji's inability to retain talent and its handling of Selen's termination.

Later that day, in North American Time, Hyte, a custom PC case and accessory maker, announced that in response to the current situation, it had terminated its current projects with Nijisanji.

On 12 February, Nijisanji EN Liver Elira Pendora premiered a YouTube video addressing the situation. In the video, Elira and two other Livers, Vox Akuma and Ike Eveland, claimed that the company had been receiving documents from Selen's lawyer that contained false accusations and personal information of other Livers, which raised concerns of doxxing. They reiterated the claim that Selen had posted the cover without waiting for permission from management and that it was set to be rereleased once approved, showing a screenshot of a partial Slack conversation. Some Livers reached out to Selen regarding her reaction to the incident, which was allegedly cited by Selen's lawyers as part of the bullying and harassment allegations. Vox and Ike expressed that they felt hurt and sad by the contents of the documents made by someone they "considered a good friend". In particular, Vox stated that the document cited a secretly recorded voice call as evidence of favoritism within the agency. Overall, this statement was received poorly on the internet, with many accusing the talents of reading from a script and questioning why the video was posted ahead of an official statement from management. The scheduled release of the video coincided with Dokibird's first gaming stream. Dokibird made a Tweet in response to the video asserting that the document was not supposed to be shared outside of the legal department, and speculated whether confidential information had been incorrectly shared, which could also violate privacy law. Dokibird expanded on her response on 14 February, apologizing for her inclusion of the recording of Vox in the document and expressed her sentiment of wanting to move on and for the public to not inquire about further details.

Later that day, Anycolor CEO Riku Tazumi released a statement addressing the controversy via the Nijisanji EN Official YouTube channel. He clarified that the investor relations statement was meant only for investors, but acknowledged that the language used was inappropriate.

Our wording lacked consideration for the situation and caused NIJISANJI EN fans and everyone who supports the VTuber industry to feel that ANYCOLOR Inc. undervalued the impact of Selen’s contract termination, or Selen herself. I deeply regret this outcome and will be rethinking how our communication in English is done.

— Riku Tazumi, Addressing Your Concerns

He also stated the importance of Tatsuki in cultivating the growth of Nijisanji. In terms of cultivating a safe environment, Tazumi acknowledged that the conflict has not only affected them as a company but also the overall well-being of their talents. Tazumi also acknowledged the lack of content in Nijisanji EN and promised to work on it by recruiting more staff to this division to aid in the agency's other content offerings aside from the typical content. Lastly, he commented that talents are "irreplaceable" and that beyond business partners, they are the most important individuals that they must protect as a company.

== Events ==
- Nijisanji Music Festival: Powered by DMM music (2 October 2019)
- Virtual to Live in Ryōgoku Kokugikan (8 December 2019)
- Nijisanji Anniversary Festival 2021 Eve Festival feat. Flow (27–28 February 2021)
  - Nijisanji Japan Tour 2020 "Shout in the Rainbow! Tokyo Revenge Performance" (27 February 2021) – at Tokyo Big Sight, Ariake, Tokyo. Live Concert with online stream and limited audience due to COVID restriction.
- Nijisanji AR Stage "Light Up Tones" (31 July – 1 August 2021)
- Nijisanji held two concerts at Yokohama Pia Arena MM over two days from 30 to 31 October 2021:
  - "Nijirock Next Beat" with 7 livers on 30 October.
  - "initial step in Nijisanji" with 8 livers from First Wave on 31 October.

=== NIJISANJI Fes ===
NIJISANJI Fes — commonly referred to as "NijiFes" — is Anycolor's annual flagship interactive convention in Tokyo, Japan, with more than 140 of the company's VTubers participating each year. The event features live concerts, interactive booths, meet-and-greets, talent-curated exhibitions, and stage programs. The event was first held in 2021, with 2026 marking the convention's 5th edition. Notably, there was no standalone "2024 NijiFes" because the event schedule shifted from December 2024 to February 2025; Anycolor cites the shift in timeline as a strategic decision to align this flagship event with Nijisanji's 7th anniversary.

In ANYCOLOR's 2024 financial report, the company reported that the 2023 edition of NijiFes attracted over 65,000 attendees, making over ¥6.4 billion in ticket sales alone (approximately $44.8 million USD; 1JPY = 0.007USD).

NIJISANJI Fes: Past Event Dates
Event Name	Dates	Venue
NIJISANJI Anniversary Festival 2021	February 27 - 28, 2021	Tokyo Big Sight
NIJISANJI Fes 2022	October 1 - 2, 2022	Makuhari Messe
NIJISANJI Fes 2023	December 23 - 24, 2023	Tokyo Big Sight
NIJISANJI 7th Anniversary Festival	February 20 - 24, 2025	Makuhari Messe
NIJISANJI Fes 2026	May 16 - 17, 2026	Makuhari Messe

== Awards and nominations ==
Year	Ceremony	Category	Nominee	Result	Ref.
2023	The Vtuber Awards	Best FPS VTuber	Selen Tatsuki	Won	
2023	The Vtuber Awards	Best FPS VTuber	Shu Yamino	Nominated	
2023	The Vtuber Awards	Best Minecraft VTuber	Pomu Rainpuff	Nominated	
2023	The Vtuber Awards	Best Roleplay/ASMR VTuber	Vox Akuma	Nominated	
2023	The Vtuber Awards	Miss VTuber	Elira Pendora	Nominated	
2023	The Vtuber Awards	Best VTuber Org	Nijisanji	Nominated	
2023	The Vtuber Awards	Most Dedicated Fanbase	Kindred	Nominated	
2023	The Vtuber Awards	Best Philanthropic Event	Mika Melatika's 60-hour charity marathon	Won	
2023	The Vtuber Awards	Best Philanthropic Event	Vox Akuma's Save Charity stream	Nominated	
2023	The Vtuber Awards	Gamer of the Year	Selen Tatsuki	Won	
2023	The Vtuber Awards	Gamer of the Year	Kuzuha	Nominated	
2023	The Vtuber Awards	VTuber of the Year	Hyakumantenbara Salome	Nominated	
2024	The Vtuber Awards	Best FPS VTuber	Kuzuha	Nominated	
2024	The Vtuber Awards	Mister Vtuber	Ike Eveland	Nominated	
2024	The Vtuber Awards	Miss Vtuber	Lize Helesta	Nominated	
2024	The Vtuber Awards	Best Vtuber Organization	Nijisanji	Nominated	
2024	The Vtuber Awards	Vtuber of the Year	Tsukino Mito	Nominated	
