= Glorb =

Pseudonymous music producer

- Glorb's icon
- Other name: GlorbWorldwide
- Occupations: YouTuber; TikToker; Rapper

TikTok information
- Page: glorbworldwide
- Followers: 913.1 thousand

YouTube information
- Channel: Glorb
- Years active: 2023–present
- Genres: Rage, gangsta rap, drill
- Subscribers: 1.17 million
- Views: 381.3 million
- Last updated: March 18, 2026
- Website: glorbworldwide.com

Glorb (also known as GlorbWorldwide) is a pseudonymous YouTuber and TikToker who creates rap music using AI-generated voices of characters from the animated series SpongeBob SquarePants.

The creator's true identity has not been revealed. Songs from the creator's social media channels have gone viral and led to significant media attention, including renewed discussion on the copyright and legal implications of AI-generated content involving third-party characters.

== Identity ==
Glorb is pseudonymous. In an interview with MoistCr1tikal, Glorb claimed to have been leaving small hints in their music about their identity. Glorb is not affiliated with Nickelodeon.

== Content and themes ==
Glorb produces their songs using generative AI technology, replicating the voices of characters from the American animated television series SpongeBob SquarePants.

In the videos, the SpongeBob character and his friends frequently rap about guns and drugs. For example, the "Eugene" music video (named after the first name of Mr. Krabs) opens with an animation of a newscaster reporting on a shooting at the Chum Bucket, a restaurant which is run by Mr. Krabs' rival, Plankton.

The songs and their associated music videos form an overarching story arc parodying the longtime rivalry between Mr. Krabs and Plankton in the series, portraying both characters as rap artists amidst the backdrop of a gang war, releasing multiple disses towards each other. Except for Karen, the major characters are portrayed as using stage names.

== Release and reception ==
Glorb began uploading to YouTube and TikTok in June 2023. The animated music video for "The Bottom 2", was uploaded on December 6, 2023, and has received over 26 million views on YouTube as of March 2026. The song has also been streamed more than 11 million times on Spotify.

Emily Forlini of PCMag said that the images and voices were "indistinguishable" from the actual show, the frequent use of profanities and violence notwithstanding.

The nature of the channel has raised copyright concerns. Legal experts have debated whether music made in the style of a public figure or character is considered to be legal. The use of AI-generated content and music on social media platforms has increased in recent years. K.J. Genualdo of Music Times noted parallels to "Heart on My Sleeve", a 2023 AI-generated song featuring the vocals of Drake and The Weeknd that was taken down by Universal Music Group. Alexandra Roberts, a law and media professor at Northeastern University, said that the channel's use of copyrighted characters for profit could raise legal concerns, but also that the question overall was still up in the air.

== Discography ==
=== Singles ===
Year	Title	Featured artists
2023	"The Formula"	Mr Swags
2023	"Krab Walk"	Mr Swags
2023	"Fun"	SpongeOpp
2023	"KYS"	Dankton
2023	"The Bottom"	Mr Swags, SpongeOpp and Squidwock
2023	"KFC"	Dankton and the Notorious P.A.T.
2023	"MHMM"	Sandy Thee Squirrel
2023	"Eugene"	
2023	"STD (Mr Swags Diss)"	
2023	"Dumb Bell (A$AP Larry)"	
2023	"Sadkini"	
2023	"Killcam"	
2023	"Vengeance"	
2023	"Can Gangsters Cry?"	
2023	"DND"	
2023	"The Bottom 2"	
2023	"White Christmas"	
2024	"Trendsetter"	
2024	"Mob Ties"	
2024	"Ocean's Eleven"	
2024	"The Bottom 3"	
2025	"GO!"	
2025	"GHOST IN THE SHELL"	
2025	"LOIS"	
2025	"Gary Hit'Em (The Bottom 2 Flip)"	NawnSense!
2026	"ATLANTIS"	

== See also ==
- Artificial intelligence and copyright
- Music and artificial intelligence
