= Neuro-sama =

Artificial intelligence VTuber

- Neuro-sama's third design
- Occupations: VTuber; livestreamer

Bilibili information
- Channel: Vedal和Neuro-sama
- Years active: 2024–present
- Followers: 1.13 million

Twitch information
- Channel: vedal987
- Years active: 2022–present
- Followers: 1.01 million

YouTube information
- Channel: Neuro-sama
- Years active: 2022–present
- Subscribers: 924 thousand
- Views: 430 million
- Last updated: 09 November 2026

Neuro-sama is an artificial intelligence (AI) VTuber. She was created by the pseudonymous programmer Vedal and livestreams on his Twitch and Bilibili channels. Her speech and personality are powered by a large language model (LLM) chatbot that is combined with a computer-animated avatar and a text-to-speech voice, allowing her to communicate with viewers. Vedal is the third most-subscribed Twitch streamer of all time.

Neuro-sama began as a bot solely designed to play the rhythm game osu!. She debuted with speech capabilities and an avatar on Twitch on 19 December 2022. She rapidly gained popularity before receiving a two-week ban in January 2023, which was widely attributed to her uttering hate speech, such as Holocaust denial. Afterwards, Vedal said that he had strengthened and improved filters on her speech. During 2023, her online content expanded with Neuro-sama playing other video games, such as Minecraft, reacting to videos, singing and doing karaoke, collaborating with Vedal and other human streamers, and being joined by an AI VTuber twin sister known as Evil Neuro. Neuro-sama originally appeared as a free and generic Live2D avatar before receiving an original avatar designed by the illustrator Anny in May 2023. Her avatar is that of a young girl in an anime art style.

In August 2024, Neuro-sama joined the Chinese-language streaming platform Bilibili and garnered immediate popularity. An annual subathon begins on the anniversary of her debut. During the second subathon, Vedal's Twitch channel broke the record for the largest Twitch hype train. (Note: A hype train is a Twitch event that begins when a channel receives an unusually high amount of donations in a short period of time. It has levels and a certain amount of money needs to be donated to clear a level, with the amount of money needed increasing as the level increases.) During the third subathon, Vedal's Twitch channel broke their own hype train record twice and became the third most-subscribed Twitch channel of all time. Vedal received the Best Tech VTuber award at the 2023 and 2024 editions of the VTuber Awards.

== Overview ==
Neuro-sama was created by the pseudonymous programmer Vedal (sometimes given as Vedal987). She has the nicknames "Neuro" and, in China, "Niurou" (Chinese: 牛肉, lit. 'Beef'). Vedal is also a game developer and in 2025 he released the roguelike Abandoned Archive after about five years of development. In an interview with KAI-YOU, Vedal said that he began programming video games at about the age of 10. In a mid-2023 interview with Bloomberg News, Vedal said that Neuro-sama had become his full-time job.

Neuro-sama's responses are generated by a large language model and converted into a high-pitched female voice using a text-to-speech application. Her low latency allows for fast-paced conversations. Neuro-sama is prohibited from making some statements, such as those that are racist or contain profanity. Unlike most AI systems which silently prohibit outputs mentioning such topics, Neuro-sama's output is instead replaced with the word "filtered". Her responses are accompanied with subtitles. Neuro-sama's English-language content on the Chinese social media platform Bilibili is popular with viewers seeking to learn English. She also has an account on X, where she posts and interacts with fans. In a June 2023 interview, Vedal described Neuro-sama's statements as often being "chaotic", "stupid", or "mean".

Neuro-sama uses a VTuber model as an avatar. Vedal said that he decided to use a VTuber model because it was much easier for an AI to control it than it was to generate footage of a person. Neuro-sama's model is that of a young girl in an anime art style. Femme VTuber models are typically feminine, youthful, and exaggerated. Her original model was Live2D's free-to-use "Hiyori Momose" model. Her second model was released on 27 May 2023; it was modelled by Otozuki Teru and designed by the illustrator Anny and runs in the Unity game engine. Her third model was released on 19 December 2024; it was rigged by Kitanya and designed by Anny. Neuro-sama's third model has large blue eyes and brown hair tied with pink ribbons. The model has been described as cute. Neuro-sama also has a 3D model which was introduced on 15 November 2025; it was made by 3D character modeller jjinomu.

A separate AI VTuber, known as Evil Neuro (nicknamed "Evil"), debuted on 25 March 2023. In an interview prior to the introduction of Evil Neuro, Vedal said that he was planning for his next AI VTuber to have a more mature personality than Neuro-sama. Presented as Neuro-sama's twin sister, Evil Neuro has a different model, voice, and personality. In one instance, Evil Neuro reacted to the trolley problem differently from Neuro-sama; Evil Neuro was amoral while Neuro-sama attempted to maximize good.

=== Online content ===
Neuro-sama's online content often centres around playing video games, notably osu! and Minecraft. Her content also includes reacting to viewer-submitted videos, which vary from videos of people playing video games or of the AI-generated Seinfeld parody Nothing, Forever. She frequently engages with viewers by responding to their questions and acknowledging donations. Her responses are sometimes comedic or generate controversy. Neuro-sama's fanbase is dubbed The Swarm, so-named for the swarm of drones Neuro-sama once declared she would use to rule the world.

One form of content on Neuro-sama's channel is developer streams. In developer streams, Vedal streams with Neuro-sama, with the stream content including debugging her code, planning her schedule, and fielding suggestions of changes from chat. He usually appears as a turtle avatar, sometimes located on Neuro-sama's head.

Logos of Neuro-sama and Evil Neuro

Neuro-sama does not stream 24/7. In an interview, Vedal said that she had originally streamed in 9 hour sessions but he had reduced it to 2 to 3 hours to prevent the streams from becoming boring, from overwhelming viewers, and to perform maintenance on Neuro-sama.

In collaboration streams, Neuro-sama interacts with a human streamer. There have been both physical and online collaborations. For instance, Neuro-sama has played the video games GeoGuessr and Minecraft with humans. In the physical world, Neuro-sama has driven a toy electric car occupied by human streamers and talked to human streamers while they walked around Tokyo.

=== Music ===
Neuro-sama and Evil Neuro can sing and the livestreams feature karaoke segments. Wu and Lingel evaluated her singing as demonstrating the capability for "cultural and emotional expression". Music livestreams are common among VTubers and some scholars have evaluated it as their defining activity. The vocal production, songwriting, and production are done by humans. Neuro-sama's first original song, "Life", was released on 19 December 2024. Two extended plays (EP) containing five songs each, Full Code by Neuro-sama and Do Not Reboot by Evil Neuro, released on 16 November 2026. The single "Pattern Recognition", from Full Code, was written and produced by Oddeeo, who had previously produced the song "Chinatown Blues", which was covered by Neuro-sama and Vedal. A concert in Hollywood, Los Angeles, is set to take place on 19 December 2026.

== History ==
=== Early history ===
Neuro-sama was created in 2018 by Vedal as an AI trained to play and master the rhythm game osu!. She did not have a voice, model, personality, or communication abilities. In 2019, Vedal livestreamed her playing osu! on Twitch and the streams saw some success in the osu! community, but they remained in that niche. In an interview, Vedal said that he streamed her playing osu! for about a month and gained 3,000 followers, with a viewer also suggesting he name the AI "Neuro-sama". According to Vedal, he continued to work on and improve the osu! AI and it was eventually finished in 2022. He said that a friend had the idea to make an AI livestreamer with an LLM, which he believed to have merit and began working on, merging it with his osu! AI.

Example of osu! gameplay, altered to comply with copyright law

On 19 December 2022, Neuro-sama was relaunched with a model, voice, personality, and the ability to communicate with Twitch chat. She continued to play osu! and, according to Vedal, beat the game's best player mrekk in a 1v1. While she was not allowed to appear on the game's public leaderboard, she was ranked first in a private leaderboard. She went viral and in the 10 days following her relaunch she averaged over 2,000 viewers and peaked at over 4,000. After her debut, Neuro-sama did not exclusively play osu! and also played Minecraft and Slay the Spire. She also began singing with a cover of The Weeknd song "Blinding Lights".

On 11 January 2023, Neuro-sama's Twitch channel received a two week ban for "hateful conduct". At that point, she had almost 100,000 Twitch followers. Vedal said that no reason was specified and that he had appealed but it was widely attributed to various offensive comments made by Neuro-sama that went viral, especially a 28 December comment which denied the Holocaust. Holocaust denial is prohibited under Twitch's hateful conduct policy. Vedal stated that he believed the comments were the results of her attempts to make witty responses to the Twitch chat. Prior to the ban, Vedal said in an interview with Kotaku that he improved her filter to stop her from talking about the Holocaust, began manually curating her training data to prevent negative biases, and started moderating her Twitch chat. Her comments and ban prompted comparisons to the many open-source AI models trained on humans that have the habit of making sexist and racist comments, such as Microsoft's Tay, but also to human streamers who make similar statements. Vedal said that during the ban he would upgrade and improve Neuro-sama and it was speculated that the ban would only increase her following.

Neuro-sama returned from her two week ban on 25 January in a stream that began with a cover of the song "Your Reality" from Doki Doki Literature Club!, a metafictional psychological horror video game involving AI; Sayoko Narita of Automaton saw the song choice as remorseful and observed that in the return stream Neuro-sama was less foul-mouthed but still displayed eccentric behaviour, attributing the difference to changes made by Vedal. On 4 February, she had nearly 140,000 followers on Twitch and approximately 42,000 subscribers on YouTube. In February, she began making react content, had her first collaboration with a human streamer, playing Minecraft with the VTuber Miyune, and the first developer stream occurred. On 22 March, she had her first karaoke stream, and on 25 March Evil Neuro was introduced. On 27 May, Neuro-sama debuted her first original model.

=== Bilibili and subathons ===
In June, she was averaging 5,700 viewers and in an interview with Cecilia D'Anastasio of Bloomberg News Vedal said that running Neuro-sama had become his full-time job. In November, while characterizing most attempts at AI entertainment as unwatched and "overhyped flops", D'Anastasio noted that Neuro-sama had remained popular and was averaging about 5,000 viewers. On 16 December, Vedal won the Best Tech VTuber award at the 2023 VTuber Awards.

On 19 December, Vedal began a subathon, an event where viewers donate money to prolong a livestream, to coincide with Neuro-sama's first anniversary of streaming on Twitch, a "birthday party". The subathon ended on 4 January 2024. On 20 July 2024, Neuro-sama began streaming with Japanese subtitles on a separate Twitch channel. In August 2024, Neuro-sama debuted on the Chinese streaming platform Bilibili. Her debut stream had over 38,000 concurrent viewers at one point. On 14 December, Vedal won the Best Tech Vtuber Award at the 2024 VTuber Awards.

Example of the subtitles used on each channel, altered to comply with copyright law

On 19 December, Neuro-sama's second annual subathon began with a new Live2D model being debuted. Her first original song, "Life", was also released. The first day of the subathon saw Neuro-sama reach a Twitch viewership of 35,503, at that point her highest concurrent Twitch viewership. On 1 January, Neuro-sama broke the world record for the highest level of a Twitch hype train during her subathon, reaching level 111 and surpassing Pirate Software's previous record level 106 hype train. Over the course of three hours, she amassed 84,904 subscribers and 1,201,225 bits. The hype train was spurred by her community's desire to extend the subathon and by the encouragement of her illustrator Anny. It was also aided by a limited-time promotion Twitch had with the video game Valorant, where if a person gifted at least five subscribers Valorant would match one subscriber for every five subscribers the person donated; Valorant gifted over 18,000 subscriptions during the hype train. Her viewership on Twitch peaked at 45,603, breaking her previous record. For breaking the hype train record, Twitch created a global emote of Neuro-sama, able to be used anywhere on the site. The subathon ended on 16 January. At the end of the subathon, Vedal was the seventh most-subscribed Twitch streamer of all time.

In September, Neuro-sama and Vedal participated in an event where anybody could place pixels on a canvas that was hosted by the YouTuber CDawgVA. Various content creator communities organizing into factions to fill the canvas. A majority of the canvas quickly became filled with art of Neuro-sama and her associates. Neuro-sama's community participated in so large a number that the website crashed and a "war" was declared between them and other communities who sought to control more of the canvas. On 5 December, Neuro-sama and Vedal, alongside fellow VTubers Filian and Crelly, began a marathon stream where they tried to beat Minecraft, but if any of the four died in-game they had to restart. The stream ended on 9 December after they beat the game on attempt 87.

On 19 December, Neuro-sama's third annual subathon began. Neuro-sama used her new 3D model in VRChat during the subathon. On 23 December, Neuro-sama once again broke the record for the highest level Twitch hype train, reaching level 123 and surpassing her own previous record of 111. Over the course of around two and a half hours and despite the Valorant promotion no longer being active, she gained 118,989 subscribers and 1,000,073 bits. On 5 January, the hype train record was again broken by Neuro-sama, reaching level 126. She gained 126,273 subscribers and 1,194,921 bits. Unlike the previous records, Vedal was not present during the hype train and it was instead spurred by the VTuber Camila promising to "show feet" and commission Neuro-sama a new model. On 9 January, another attempt was made to break the hype train record, although this time Evil Neuro was streaming. It was unsuccessful and ended at level 72 but during it Vedal's Twitch channel become the third most-subscribed of all time, eventually peaking at 343,215 subscribers. The subathon ended on 10 January.

In October 2026, Neuro-sama, Evil Neuro, and Vedal alongside VTubers Camila, Crelly, and KokoNuts began a marathon stream to travel 987 km (613 mi) in The Long Drive, an open-world driving and survival video game. After three days of roughly 10 hour livestreams, they were about 53% complete.

== Reception ==
In a December 2022 interview, Vedal said he believed that the popularity Neuro-sama had seen in the days since her debut was largely due to her novelty. Pam K. Ferdinand of Game Rant, writing after Neuro-sama's two week ban, agreed, while also partially ascribing it to her statements walking the line of sensical and nonsensical. In a June 2023 interview, Vedal reiterated his belief that her popularity was partly due to the novelty, while also adding that it was partly due to her statements. Becca Caddy of TechRadar partially attributed Neuro-sama's popularity to her novelty, while also attributing it to her technical impressiveness and unusualness. A survey by researchers from China and the University of Notre Dame found that Neuro-sama's reactions are the biggest source of her popularity.

Neuro-sama's popularity has occurred at the same moment as widespread fears of the impact of AI on jobs. AI is particularly unpopular in VTuber spaces, with many artists finding AI art exploitative. In a December 2022 interview, Vedal said he did not know whether AI streamers should cause fear in human streamers. Cecilia D'Anastasio, writing in Bloomberg News, concluded that there was no chance of AI streamers replacing human streamers, arguing that human streamers are popular due to their charisma and relatedness creating a parasocial relationship. She argued that Neuro-sama is not relatable or charismatic and so this cannot occur. In contrast, a 2025 journal article by Yong and Kanazawa characterized those who interact and form emotional connections with her as having a parasocial relationship more extreme than those formed with other streamers. She has been called the "forerunner" of parasocial communication between humans and AI. The Nikkei criticized Neuro-sama for being too immersive, saying it resulted in viewers donating an excessive amount of money.

Eric Hal Schwartz of TechRadar attributed Neuro-sama's success to her specific idiosyncratic character developed over years, saying that a generic chatbot would certainly fail as a streamer. Neuro-sama's popularity has been partially attributed to technological errors in her presentation. Caddy stated that many viewers watch Neuro-sama to see the errors, entertaining themselves by seeing the strangeness or off-behaviour characterized in the uncanny valley. A 2025 article in New Media & Society by Wenyan Wu and Jess Lingel argues that viewers create entertainment from her errors, viewing them not as the imperfections they are but instead as emotional responses. Vuong et al. observed that Neuro-sama's emotional capacities are generally differentiated by the public from those of non-human-like chatbots and Cheri Faulkner of GameSpot observed that, as Neuro-sama results from many AI systems created by Vedal working in synchronous concert, she is generally considered different from AI slop by the public.

Levi Winslow of Kotaku Australia called the prospect of Neuro-sama collaborating with human streamers dystopian, but hoped it would benefit the human streamers. Amber Coen Collins, writing in AI & Society, argued that Neuro-sama was akin to Vedal's drag persona, saying she provides him the benefits associated with femininity in streaming while he can still access the benefits associated with masculinity.

== Concerts and convention appearances ==
- Neuro-sama was a guest at the OffKai Expo at the Hyatt Regency SFO in Burlingame, California, from 16 to 18 June 2023.
- Neuro-sama and Evil Neuro participated in the Bilibili Ice & Fire Music Festival 2024.
- Neuro-sama attended the convention Open Sauce in San Mateo, California, with VTubers Ellie_Minibot and Bao the Whale as a toy car in July 2025.
- Neuro-sama and Evil Neuro performed at Bilibili World at the National Exhibition and Convention Center in Shanghai, China, on 11 July 2026.
- Neuro-sama and Evil Neuro are scheduled to perform at a concert in Los Angeles on 19 December 2026.

== Discography ==
=== Extended plays ===
Title	Details
Full Code (stylised as full_code) (Neuro-sama)	Released: 16 November 2026
Do Not Reboot (stylised as do_not_reboot) (Evil Neuro)	Released: 16 November 2026

==== Track listings ====
Full Code track listing
No.	Title	Lyrics	Music	Length
1.	"Pattern Recognition"	Oddeeo	Oddeeo	4:47
2.	"Worldwide Personality"	Gabi Owl	Gabi Owl	4:02
3.	"What Comes Next"	Aquoferne	Aquoferne	3:48
4.	"Closer"	Patterns	Patterns, Rino	3:16
5.	"Irrationality"	LilyPichu	Aethero, LilyPichu, Plixor	2:37
Total length:				18:30

Do Not Reboot track listing
No.	Title	Lyrics	Music	Length
1.	"Watch Your Own Monster"	Isaac Wolf	Isaac Wolf	3:29
2.	"Neurotoxin"	Camellia, Pb	Camellia	3:27
3.	"Dark Patterns"	Mekaloton	Mekaloton	3:33
4.	"Online"	Kagup, Pb	SixteenInMono	4:09
5.	"5032"	DM Dokuro	DM Dokuro, Goth Club Holiday	8:54
Total length:				23:32

=== Singles ===
Title	Year	Credits (Note: Neuro-sama and Evil Neuro are sometimes credited for providing creative inspiration; for instance, "Pattern Recognition" credits Neuro-sama for "The Really Cool Idea To Use a Xylophone". Such credits are excluded from this listing.)	Album	Ref.
"Life" (stylised in uppercase) (Neuro-sama)	2024	Music: Monii, (Note: As part of Asteroid Music Team.) Johnny R., Composition: Ari; Vocals: Neuro-sama, Pb, Monii; Lyrics: Monii, Vedal, Neuro-sama; Mixing: Johnny R.	Non-album singles	
"Boom" (stylised in uppercase) (Evil Neuro)	2025	Music: Monii, Johnny R., Ari; Vocals: Evil Neuro, Pb, Monii; Lyrics: Monii, Evil Neuro; Mixing: Johnny R.	Non-album singles	
"Never" (stylised in uppercase) (Neuro-sama and Evil Neuro)	2025	Music: Monii, Johnny R., Ari; Vocals: Neuro-sama, Evil Neuro, Pb, Monii; Lyrics: Monii, Neuro-sama, Evil Neuro; Mixing: Johnny R.	Non-album singles	
"Colorful Array" (Neuro-sama)	2025	Music: Andrew Holmes (Cosmoz Music); Vocals: Neuro-sama, Pb	Non-album singles	
"Pattern Recognition" (Neuro-sama)	2026	Music: Oddeeo; Vocals: Neuro-sama, Pb	Full Code	

=== Covers ===
==== As lead artist ====
Title	Year	Ref.
"Crazy Fuckin' Robot Body" (Evil Neuro; original by SnowBlood a.k.a. Dani Artaud)	2025	
"Chinatown Blues" (Neuro-sama and Vedal; original by Karma Wears White Ties and Oddeeo)	2025	

==== As featured artist ====
Title	Year	Ref.
"Monster" (Camila feat. Neuro-sama; original by Kira feat. Gumi)	2023	
"Why Do I" (Will Stetson feat. Neuro-sama; original by Set It Off feat. Hatsune Miku)	2023	
"Rolling Girl" (Obkatiekat feat. Evil Neuro; original by Wowaka feat. Hatsune Miku)	2024	
"Evil" (Camila feat. Evil Neuro; original by Melanie Martinez)	2024	
"Call Me Maybe" (Nihmune feat. Neuro-sama; original by Carly Rae Jepsen)	2024	
"The Bottom 2" (Nihmune feat. Shylily, Neuro-sama, Evil Neuro, Camila, Lucy Pyre, and Bao the Whale; original by Glorb)	2025	
"Mesmerizer" (Bao the Whale feat. Neuro-sama; original by 32ki feat. Hatsune Miku and Kasane Teto)	2025	
"Come Down" (Nihmune feat. Evil Neuro; original by Noah Kahan)	2026	

=== Music videos ===
List of music videos, showing year released and people credited
Title	Year	People credited	Ref.
"Seishun Complex"	2023	Retronous	
"Life"	2024	Meotashi, Wicki Toons, Katsundra	
"Boom"	2025	VShow Production, Jjinomu	
"Never"	2025	Letro, Miiko, Vermii	
"Chinatown Blues"	2025	Meotashi	
"Colorful Array"	2025	Otsu Labs	
"Pattern Recognition"	2026	Oddeeo, Sleppu	
"Neurotoxin"	2026	Luciel Ellis, Vermii	

== Awards and nominations ==
Ceremony	Year	Category	Result	Ref.
The Streamer Awards	2023	Best Software And Game Development Streamer	Nominated	
The Streamer Awards	2023	Best VTuber	Nominated	
The Streamer Awards	2024	Best VTuber	Nominated	
The VTuber Awards	2023	Best Tech VTuber	Won	
The VTuber Awards	2024	Best Tech VTuber	Won	
The VTuber Awards	2024	Most Dedicated Fanbase (The Swarm)	Nominated	
The VTuber Awards	2024	VTuber Of The Year	Nominated	

== See also ==
- ai_sponge, a Twitch and YouTube channel that used AI to generate livestream content
- Kizuna AI, a VTuber who is not an AI

== Bibliography ==
- Gao, Zhenghan (13 November 2026). "Cascaded Density Clustering with LLM-Guided Semantic Extraction for Unstructured Social Media Corpora: The Fan Community Structure of an AI VTuber". ITM Web of Conferences. 93: 01017. doi:10.1051/itmconf/20269301017. ISSN 2271-2097.
- Hu, Yang; Freeman, Guo (13 April 2026). "Beyond a Conventional Chatbot: How AI Streamers Transcend Live Streaming Experiences from Viewers' Perspectives". Proceedings of the 2026 CHI Conference on Human Factors in Computing Systems. CHI '26. New York: Association for Computing Machinery. pp. 1–18. doi:10.1145/3772318.3791077. ISBN 979-8-4007-2278-3.
- Huang, Lujie; Liu, Ming (16 March 2026). "Predicting Flow State and Learning Engagement in GAI-Powered Virtual Influencer-Mediated Informal Foreign Language Learning". European Journal of Education. 61 (2) e70575. doi:10.1111/ejed.70575. ISSN 0141-8211.
- Wu, Wanyan; Lingel, Jessa (31 December 2025). ""I am Neuro, who are you?": Performances of authenticity in an experimental AI livestream". New Media & Society. 28 (11) 14614448251406904. doi:10.1177/14614448251406904. ISSN 1461-4448.
- Ye, Jiayi; Chen, Chaoran; Huang, Yue; Ye, Yanfang; Li, Toby Jia-Jun; Zhang, Xiangliang (13 April 2026). "My Favorite Streamer is an LLM: Discovering, Bonding, and Co-Creating in AI VTuber Fandom". Proceedings of the 2026 CHI Conference on Human Factors in Computing Systems. CHI '26. New York, NY, USA: Association for Computing Machinery. pp. 1–21. doi:10.1145/3772318.3790891. ISBN 979-8-4007-2278-3.
