= J-core =

Japanese hardcore techno subgenre

- Stylistic origins: Hardcore; speedcore; gabber; happy hardcore; doujin music; denpa songs; anisongs
- Cultural origins: 1990s, Japan
- Typical instruments: Synthesizer; drum machine; sequencer; sampler; digital audio workstation
- Derivative forms: Nightcore

Local scenes
- Akihabara; Shibuya

Other topics
- Vocaloid

J-core (Jコア) is the style of hardcore techno associated with Japanese groups and DJs from the 1990s onward. Originally called "Japcore", the name "J-core" is an abbreviation of "Japanese hardcore". J-core music is often found in rhythm games and forms a substantial part of the doujin music scene.

== Characteristics ==
J-core is often used as an umbrella term for many types of hardcore created by Japanese producers, including speedcore, 4-beat, and hardstyle.

Despite the wide range of music under this umbrella, consistent elements include high tempos, samples derived from video games and anime, colorful kawaii imagery and album graphics, and the general borrowing of elements from otaku culture. Hardcore music created outside of Japan that incorporates these elements is also often labeled as J-core on platforms where users can upload and tag their own music.

== History ==
J-core's emergence dates back to the late 1990s, in the height of the hardcore, speedcore, and gabber techno scenes in Europe, the genre was originally named Japcore. Japanese producers combined European hardcore sounds with influences from denpa music, J-pop and otaku culture to create a new sound.

Jea of DJ Sharpnel is considered to have pioneered the style in the late 1990s. In 1998, he released High Speed Music Team by Sharpnel vs. Project Gabbangelion, the name is a reference to the anime Neon Genesis Evangelion. In the early 2000s it spread through Japanese peer-to-peer networks. According to DJ Technorch, the current abbreviated term "J-core" was first used in reference to a Western release of Sharpnel's music in 2006.

As anime became popular in North America and Europe, J-core would also find appreciation among anime fans there, allowing for the development of a Western J-core-inspired remix culture, as well as J-core's contribution to the nightcore phenomenon.

The independent music label HARDCORE TANO*C, founded in 2003 by artist REDALiCE under the name Hādokoa Tanoshī (ハードコアタノシー; "hardcore is fun") and renamed in 2007, rose to be the dominant J-core label throughout the 2010s. In addition to being heavily involved in the development and song list of the rhythm game WACCA, HARDCORE TANO*C has also collaborated with other titles such as Arcaea, maimai DX, and Muse Dash. Those rhythm games gave rise to artists such as t+pazolite, DJ Technorch or M-Project.

== Performance and popular culture ==
Unlike other variants of hardcore, J-core does not have a strong club scene. Physical concerts with small audiences exist, but many events are held via online events or livestreams.

J-core styled music is often featured in rhythm games, especially those whose main audience is in Asia or Japan; the popularity of Beatmania IIDX since its release in 1999 has introduced many to the genre. The Australian rhythm game Osu! also brought J-core to greater international attention, especially when Camellia was dubbed a featured artist in December 2018.

J-core music is primarily sold on CDs at doujinshi conventions such as Comiket and Music Media-Mix Market.
