= Camellia (musician) =

Japanese electronic musician (born 1992)

Camellia かめりあ
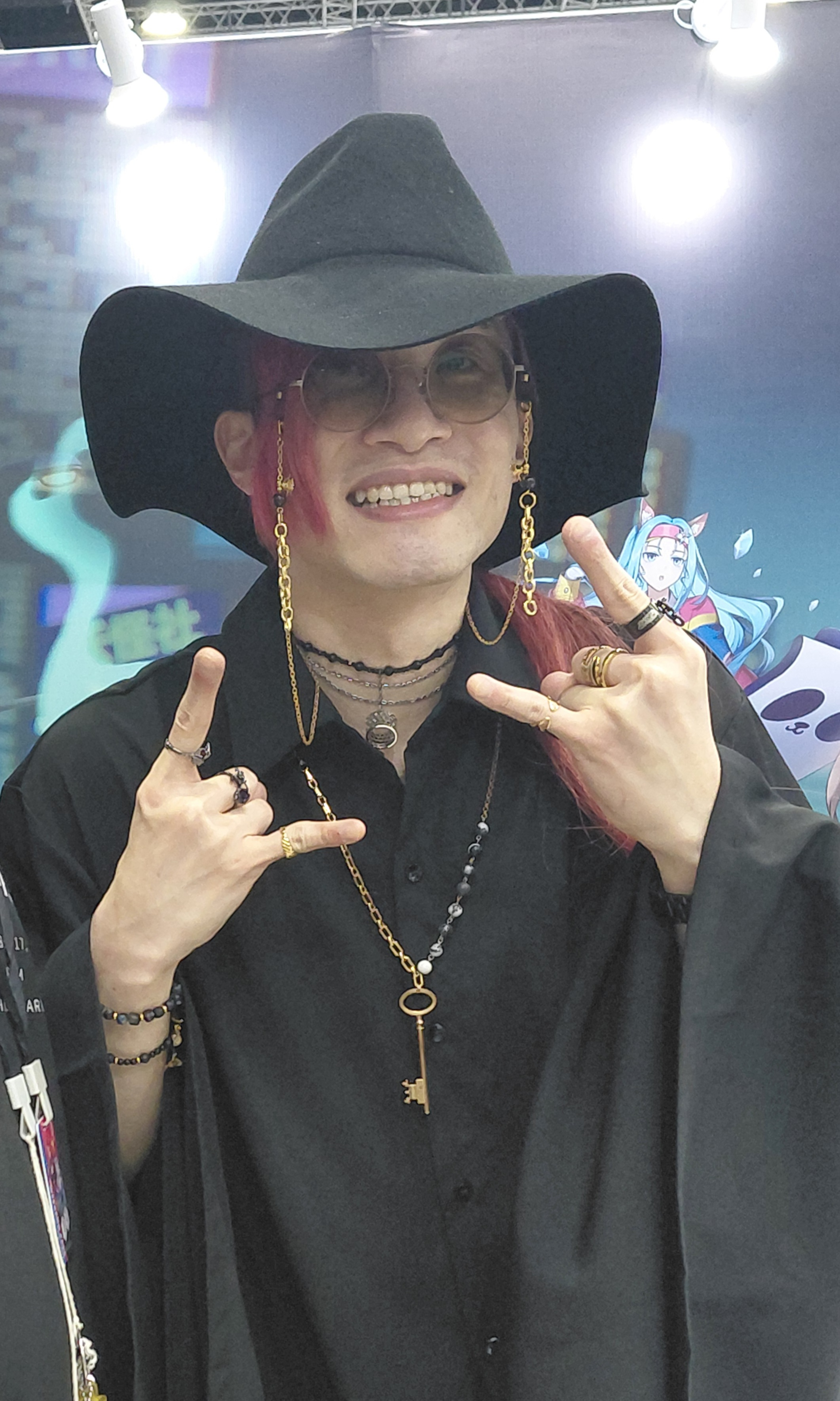
- Oya in 2025

Background information
- Also known as: Cametek; Quarks
- Born: Masaya Oya; September 28, 1992 (age 34); Asahikawa, Hokkaido, Japan
- Genres: J-core; EDM; hardcore; drum and bass; gabber; trap; speedcore; dubstep; denpa; doujin; Vocaloid (early)
- Occupations: Composer; record producer; DJ; streamer
- Years active: 2003–present
- Labels: EDP; KamelCamellia
- Website: https://cametek.jp/

Masaya Oya (Japanese: 大箭将也, Hepburn: Ōya Masaya; born September 28, 1992), known professionally as Camellia (Japanese: かめりあ, Hepburn: Kameria), is a Japanese electronic musician and record producer. He is best known for his work in the rhythm game scene and has been a composer for games such as Sound Voltex, Hatsune Miku: Project Diva, Hatsune Miku: Colorful Stage! and Beatmania IIDX. Outside of rhythm games, he has also worked with the record label Pony Canyon and is a member of the label EXITTUNES Dance Production (EDP), an imprint of Exit Tunes. He also publishes his discography on his doujin circle, KamelCamellia.

Oya began his career as a Vocaloid producer. Leaving the scene in 2013, he shifted his focus to primarily composing fast-paced electronic dance music, with tracks often reaching or exceeding 200 beats per minute. His music encompasses a variety of electronic styles, including J-core, dubstep, denpa, drum and bass, hardcore, gabber, trap, speedcore, and doujin music. He is noted for actively experimenting with diverse sounds across his works, rather than adhering to a single genre.

He often collaborates with and has released several albums alongside the singer Nanahira. He has also produced remixes of the Undertale original soundtrack (OST) and collaborations with the game designer and composer Toby Fox. His track "Ghost" gained attention as one of the hardest songs in the virtual reality (VR) rhythm game Beat Saber at the time of its release. He is popular outside of Japan through the video game osu!, where he has a dedicated fan community. Oya is also an active streamer on Twitch.

== Biography and career ==
Masaya Oya was born in Asahikawa, Hokkaido, Japan, on September 28, 1992. (Note: For September 28, see: For 1992 and birth place, see:) Oya developed an interest in music from a very young age; at ten, he began teaching himself how to play the piano. That same year, in 2003, he started producing music using his mother's computer. His first composition was created as a theme song for an online friend he met through a Flash game. He started uploading his original songs to Niconico. He also started using the voice of the vocal synthesizer software of Hatsune Miku and became a Vocaloid producer, releasing his debut album Honeyginjerale in 2010.

On August 9, 2011, Oya announced that he had contributed a track to Alstroemeria Records, a doujin circle led by Masayoshi Minoshima, known for producing the Touhou Project arrangement "Bad Apple!!". The track was the 10th song on the album and was described as a "danceable" piece with tech house influences. Oya has frequently collaborated since 2012 with the singer, utaite and VTuber Nanahira (Japanese: ななひら), with whom he has made several denpa albums. In 2013 he released the song Systematic Love which was covered by Reol two years later. In the same year, following his DJ performance at Voca Nico Night, a Vocaloid music event held on July 14, he appeared on Fuji Television. By the end of 2013 he left the Vocaloid scene for more general electronic music and released the album Paroxysm. Oya composed the song theme "Drag the Ground" for the race team Good Smile Racing in 2014.

He has collaborated with the Pony Canyon record label and is a member of the labels EDP and beatnation Rhyze. Furthermore, he publishes his discography under his own doujin circle, KamelCamellia. Oya also appears as a guest in other doujin circles such as Hardcore Tano*C. He became involved with the label through DJ Genki, who introduced him to its network of artists. His collaborations within the label include recordings such as Kasai Harcores, which brought in multiple producers for live performances. In March 2015, he performed live music at the Exit Tunes Dance Party event along with other beatnation Rhyze musicians.

In February 2018, he won the Outstanding Performance Award at the 7th Konami Arcade Championship (KAC) Original Song Contest for the song "Xéroa". That same year in December, Oya became a featured artist in the rhythm game Osu!, meaning that selected tracks by the artist can be freely used in the game. He continued to contribute to rhythm game culture with three of his compositions being added to Beat Saber in 2019, followed by additional tracks in January 2020. Among them, "Ghost" gained recognition as one of the most challenging levels in the game. Oya's studio work also reached mainstream charts; his 2020 album Xronial Xero entered the Billboard Japan Top Albums Sales Chart on March 25, 2020, peaking at number 68 in its only week on the ranking. That same year, he composed an original soundtrack for the platformer Mad Rat Dead, which was compiled into a three-disc album. In July 2022, Oya collaborated with VTuber Houshou Marine of Hololive Production to compose the single "I'm Your Treasure Box", which was later included in the album Ahoy!! You're All Pirates♡, released on October 16, 2024. The album sold 21,633 copies in Japan, as published by the Oricon Albums Chart. Between these releases, in August 2022, Oya worked with Undertale creator Toby Fox on the track "Summerblue", which was featured in Beatmania IIDX 30 Resident. In February 2024, Oya collaborated with Robert Topala to add several of his tracks to the music library of rhythm-platformer game Geometry Dash. Following Sonic Racing: CrossWorlds's release in September 2025, Oya contributed a song for the Project Onsoku collab, as well as arrangements of Kronos Island & I'm Here from Sonic Frontiers, and Dragon Road - Day from Sonic Unleashed, the first two being done with SEGA Sound Team veteran Tomoya Ohtani. In June 2026, Oya collaborated with Toby Fox on "Flower Man" and "Cutie Mew Mew Magic", tracks included on the Deltarune Chapter 5 original game soundtrack.

== Artistry ==
Oya primarily composes fast-paced electronic dance music (EDM) songs that are usually at or above the 200 beats per minute (BPM) mark. His music is described as J-core, dubstep, trance, drum and bass, hardcore, gabber, trap, speedcore, and doujin music. Théo Forey notes that unlike many electronic artists who focus on a single style, Oya stands out for spanning a wide range of genres, rather than focusing on just one. He is known for making music for many rhythm games, such as Hatsune Miku: Project Diva, Hatsune Miku: Colorful Stage!, Sound Voltex, Arcaea, and Chunithm. Regarding his role within the Exit Tunes label, Oya has described himself as "the engine of the label", stating that he aims to contribute to the label's momentum through the number of songs he writes and noting that few artists can consistently produce 100 fast-paced songs per year. Oya's contribution to the soundtracks for Mad Rat Dead featured a "happy electro" track, as described by IGN Japan.

== Discography ==
Below are the albums, EPs and singles the artist has created over time:

=== Studio albums ===
List of studio albums, with details on release dates, artists, labels and catalog numbers
Title	Release date	Artist	Label	Catalog number
honeyginjerale (ハニージンジャーエール)	October 31, 2010	Camellia	KamelCamellia	CTCD-001
TRIPPERS	May 1, 2011	Camellia	KamelCamellia	CTCD-002
mikUbiquity	October 30, 2011	Camellia	KamelCamellia	CTCD-003
Michno-sequence	July 8, 2012	Camellia	KamelCamellia	CTCD-004
flow arrow	April 29, 2013	Camellia	KamelCamellia	CTCD-005
Stance on Wave	August 12, 2013	Camellia	KamelCamellia	CTCD-006
paroxysm	December 13, 2013	Camellia	KamelCamellia	CTCD-007
[diffraction]	April 27, 2014	Camellia	KamelCamellia	CTCD-008
sudden shower	August 17, 2014	Camellia	KamelCamellia	CTCD-009
Versus! (ばーさす！)	August 17, 2014	Camellia feat. Nanahira	Confetto & KamelCamellia	KCCD-001
dreamless wanderer	December 30, 2014	Camellia	KamelCamellia	CTCD-010
PLANET//SHAPER	August 16, 2015	Camellia	KamelCamellia	CTCD-011
Replay! (りぷれい！)	August 16, 2015	Camellia feat. Nanahira	Confetto & KamelCamellia	KCCD-003
crystallized	December 31, 2015	Camellia	KamelCamellia	CTCD-012
INSANE INFLAME	April 24, 2016	Camellia	KamelCamellia	CTCD-013
MEGANTO METEOR	July 6, 2016	Camellia	EDP	QWCE-90001
3LEEP! / Sleep! (すりーぷ！)	August 14, 2016	Camellia feat. Nanahira	Confetto & KamelCamellia	KCCD-004
REALITY DISTORTION	December 31, 2016	Camellia vs Akira Complex	S2TB	S2TB-0019
Camellia "Guest Tracks" Summary & VIPs 01	April 30, 2017	Camellia	KamelCamellia	CTCD-015
INVAIDAS FROM DA JUNGLE	August 11, 2017	Camellia	KamelCamellia	CTCD-016
4ORCE! / Force! (ふぉーす！)	December 29, 2017	Camellia feat. Nanahira	Confetto & KamelCamellia	KCCD-006
GALAXY BURST	March 21, 2018	Camellia	EDP	QWCE-90016
Mira	June 6, 2018	Quarks	EXIT TUNES	SQCE-00043
Camellia "Remixes" Summary & VIPs 02	August 10, 2018	Camellia	KamelCamellia	CTCD-017
heart of android	December 30, 2018	Camellia	KamelCamellia	CTCD-018
Blackmagik Blazing	August 12, 2019	Camellia	KamelCamellia	CTCD-019
GOIN'! (ごーいん！）	August 12, 2019	Camellia feat. Nanahira	Confetto & KamelCamellia	KCCD-007
Xroniàl Xéro	March 18, 2020	Camellia	EDP, PONY CANYON	PCCA-04883
Dweller's Empty Path OST	July 10, 2020	Temmie Chang, Toby Fox, Camellia		
Tera I/O	September 27, 2020	Camellia	KamelCamellia	CTCD-020
Hololive English -Myth- Image Soundtrack	March 14, 2021	Hololive English -Myth- Ft. Camellia	Cover Corp.	CVRD-036
U.U.F.O.	July 11, 2021	Camellia	KamelCamellia	CTCD-021, CTCD-022
Ashed Wings [Limited Edition] (灰の羽搏 (限定特別盤))	February 15, 2023	Camellia	EDP, PONY CANYON	BRCA-00138
Ashed Wings [Regular Edition] (灰の羽搏 (通常盤))	February 15, 2023	Camellia	EDP, PONY CANYON	PCCA-06182
Snacko (Original Game Soundtrack)	December 7, 2023	Dale North, Camellia	Scarlet Moon Records	SMRC-1089
REX	October 27, 2024	Camellia	KamelCamellia	CTCD-023
Chimera Dragons	August 17, 2025	Camellia	KamelCamellia	CTCD-024
MOVING! (むーびんぐ！)	October 26, 2025	Camellia feat. Nanahira	KamelCamellia & Confetto	KCCD-008

=== EPs ===
List of EPs, with details on release dates, artists, labels and catalog numbers
Title	Release date	Artist	Label	Catalog number
LOP STEP RABBITS!	December 30, 2014	Camellia feat. Nanahira	Confetto & KamelCamellia	KCCD-002
Dualive	April 24, 2016	Quarks		KRCA-00001
Cyphisonia E.P.	October 30, 2016	Camellia	KamelCamellia	CTCD-014
TF40K (Thanks Twitter Followers 40K) E.P.	March 1, 2016	Camellia	KamelCamellia	
Tandeki Mirage-ism [Anime Edition] (耽溺ミラアジュイズム [アニメ盤])	June 6, 2018	kradness	EXIT TUNES	QWCE-00680
Tandeki Mirage-ism (耽溺ミラアジュイズム)	June 6, 2018	kradness	EXIT TUNES	QWCE-00681
60+3+10kE.P.	February 20, 2019	Camellia	KamelCamellia	

=== Singles ===
List of singles, with details on release dates, artists, labels and catalog numbers
Title	Release date	Artist	Label	Catalog number
Drag the ground	April 5, 2014	Camellia	Karent	
Fly to night, tonight	July 9, 2014	Camellia	Karent	
One more time * One more time...	January 21, 2015	Camellia	Karent	
THX30KFOLLOWERS	January 6, 2016	Camellia	KamelCamellia	
Nacreous Snowmelt	November 1, 2019	Camellia	KamelCamellia	
Rip It Off (Now) Rip It Off	February 19, 2020	Camellia, kradness	PONY CANYON	
Another Xronixle	March 18, 2020	Camellia	KamelCamellia	
大地の閾を探して [Looking for Edge of Ground]	May 10, 2020	Camellia	KamelCamellia	
#1f1e33	May 29, 2020	Camellia	KamelCamellia (from Arcaea)	
Qyoh (Nine Stars)	July 12, 2020	Camellia	KamelCamellia	
Wolves Standing Towards Enemies	July 16, 2020	Camellia	KamelCamellia (from Lanota)	
THE MUZZLE FACING	September 16, 2020	Camellia	KamelCamellia (From Wacca)	
No Heroes Are Allowed To Enter	October 1, 2020	Camellia	HARDCORE TANO*C	TCDR-0053
AttraqtiA	January 23, 2021	Camellia	KamelCamellia (from Arcaea & CHUNITHM)	
Unsan-Musho (雲散霧消)	February 26, 2021	Camellia	HARDCORE TANO*C	TCDR-0074
Toxic Violet Cubes	August 1, 2021	Camellia	KamelCamellia	
Burning Aquamarine	November 21, 2021	Camellia	KamelCamellia	
WOW!!!!!!!!!!	December 3, 2021	Camellia	HARDCORE TANO*C	TCDR-0124
Final-Boss-Chan	March 8, 2022	Camellia	Beat Games	
Möbius	April 28, 2022	USAO & Camellia	HARDCORE TANO*C	TCDR-0141
GHOST VS. GHOUL MASHUP	May 12, 2022	Camellia	KamelCamellia	
GHOST (2020 Halloween+++++++++ VIP)	May 12. 2022	Camellia	KamelCamellia	
Play-With-Fire / Hiasobi (ヒアソビ)	May 18, 2022	Camellia	Karent	
$100 Bills (Camellia's "215$-Step" Remix)	June 14, 2022	Camellia, Jaroslav Beck	Beat Games	
Flash Me Back	August 11, 2022	Camellia	KamelCamellia	
Forbidden Pizza! (フォビどぅん・ピザ！)	December 24, 2022	Camellia feat. Nanahira	KamelCamellia	
Waifu Jam	March 18, 2023	Ironmouse & Camellia	VShojo	
Venomous Snake / Dokuhebi (ドクヘビ)	April 19, 2023	Camellia	Karent	
Parallel Universe Shifter	September 19, 2023	Camellia	KamelCamellia	
Tempo-Katana	December 11, 2023	Camellia	Beat Games	
Rodents Kingdom	March 1, 2024	Ironmouse & Camellia	VShojo	
Tri-Peace Hi-Fu-Mi-Fu-Freedom (Triぴーす ひふみふフリーダム)	March 14, 2024	DENONBU, Camellia	BANDAI NAMCO Entertainment Inc.	
epitaxy	June 1, 2024	Camellia	KamelCamellia (from Rotaeno)	
Lustre	June 4, 2024	Camellia	Beat Games	
Crazy Reiji Play Crazy (クレイジー0時Playクレイジー)	September 18, 2024	Camellia	Karent	
Birthright Syndrome / Seimeisei Syndrome (生命性シンドロウム)	October 11, 2024	Camellia feat. Hatsune Miku	Karent	KRHS-60426
REX	October 27, 2024	Camellia	KamelCamellia	
ENÛMA∇ELIŠ ~Camellia Saga~	October 27, 2024	Camellia VS. Gram	KamelCamellia	
Operation: Zenithfall	December 8, 2024	Camellia	KamelCamellia	
Theatore Creatore	December 13, 2024	Toby Fox & Camellia	KamelCamellia (from CHUNITHM)	
Suoh Divine Raiment (蘇芳天衣)	December 16, 2024	Camellia	KamelCamellia	
War against the Eldritch Beasts (陌獸戰爭)	December 20, 2024	Camellia	KamelCamellia (from Groove Coaster)	
Seagull (Stereo Version)	March 2, 2025	Camellia	KamelCamellia	
Hiasobi / Play-With-Fire (Kasane Teto Cover) (ヒアソビ (重音テトカバー))	April 2, 2025	Camellia	Karent	
MEGA TSKR	July 20, 2025	Camellia feat. Nanahira	KamelCamellia & Confetto	
I'm Triethyl Citrate-Rate (わたしトリエチルシトレートレート)	September 1, 2025	Camellia feat. Nanahira	KamelCamellia & Confetto	
Denkoh Sekka (電光刹歌)	September 23, 2025	Camellia feat. Hatsune Miku	Karent	KRHS-61154
Exoplanetary Mirage	September 26, 2026	Camellia	KamelCamellia (From Phigros)	
Neurotoxin	November 15, 2026	Evil Neuro, Camellia, pb	Vedal AI	
