= Nanahira =

Nanahira ななひら
- Nanahira as designed by Wasabi

Background information
- Born: August 31, 1991 (age 35); Fukui, Japan
- Genres: denpa; j-pop; doujin
- Occupations: Vocalist; Voice actress
- Years active: 2008–present
- Labels: Confetto müchette
- Website: nanahira.jp

Nanahira (Japanese: ななひら, Hepburn: Nanahira; born August 31, 1991) is a Japanese singer and voice actress. She is known for her high-pitched voice and her performance in denpa songs. She is best known for her work in the rhythm game scene and has made vocals for games such as beatmania IIDX, Sound Voltex, and Muse Dash. She releases music under her own doujin music circle "Confetto" and has also released music under the label "müchette".

== Biography and career ==
Nanahira was born in Fukui, Japan, on August 31, 1991. She developed an interest in music when her grandmother taught her and her sister how to sing. In 2008, around the time she entered high school, Nanahira began her career by uploading covers of anime and Vocaloid songs on Japanese video-sharing website Nico Nico Douga.

Since then, she has performed songs for anime, video games, television, and commercial projects. Her works include the opening theme of the anime series for Takara Tomy's PuniRunes, the "Pokédance" song for Pokémon Day, the theme song for television drama Happy Kanako's Killer Life, and many songs for the beatmania IIDX and Sound Voltex game series, such as "Bassdrop Freaks", as well as songs for Muse Dash.

Nanahira frequently collaborates with music producer Camellia, with the duo having released several full albums together, such as "Versus!". They began working together in 2012, with Nanahira as the vocalist and Camellia as the composer. Nanahira has also collaborated with other artists such as music producers t+pazolite and Aiobahn, fellow denpa singer Koko, and virtual YouTuber Korone Pochi.

In 2014, she was a member of the idol group Suehiro Antenna (末広アンテナ). The group disbanded shortly after its debut.

Nanahira also did some voice acting for video games, such as the role of Qtie from Yunyun Syndrome!? Rhythm Psychosis, Yuna from Yakuzukuri Puzzle: Yumeiro Yuram, and Kanade Yamashina from Sound Voltex.

Nanahira is the voice provider for the UTAU voicebank Haruka Nana, which was released in 2009 and later received a VOICEVOX voice library in 2023. Nanahira is also the voice provider for Nanahi (七柊), a VoiSona voice library scheduled for release in December 2026.

== Discography ==
Below is a list of releases from Nanahira.

=== Studio albums ===
- Love Chu! (2014)
- Versus! (2014)
- Replay! (2015)
- Colory Starry (2015)
- Meltical Sugar Wave (2015)
- Wonder trick (2016)
- Sleep! (2016)
- Secretale (2016)
- 4orce! (2017)
- TRIPxFROLIC (2019)
- GOIN'! (2019)
- Nanamega Kingdom (2019)
- Midnight Future (2020)
- Memory-Go-Round (2020)
- Iroha Seven Wonders Exhibition (2021)
- Say Cheese! (2021)
- Screamin' Showcase (2021)
- VOTRE CHÂTEAU (2022)
- It's a Message for you (2023)
- Moving! (2025)
- Reminiscence (2026)

=== EPs ===
- LOP STEP RABBITS! (2014)
- Love Chu! 2 (2015)
- Nanairo Ribbon (2018)
- Make a Toast (2023)
- Dear, My Days! (2023)
- Good night, Dreamer. (2024)
- Patty Cake! (2025)
- A Gift for the Innocent (2025)

=== Compilation albums ===
- ICONIC (2024)
