= Arcaea =

Mobile rhythm video game

- Logo
- Developer: Lowiro
- Publisher: Lowiro
- Producer: Anton Prydatko (Guy)
- Designers: Alexander J. Lin (Toaster), Vernon Tan (Nitro), Alice Prowse (Popo), Ken Tang (k//eternal)
- Artist: シエラ (cierra)
- Writer: Terrence Smith
- Composers: ak+q, N² (ANTIREAL), Puru
- Engine: Cocos2d-x
- Platforms: iOS, Android, Nintendo Switch
- Release: iOS, Android; 9 March 2017; Nintendo Switch; 18 May 2021
- Genre: Rhythm
- Modes: Single-player, multiplayer

Arcaea is a rhythm video game developed and published by the British company Lowiro (stylized in all lowercase), first released for iOS and Android devices in 2017, and ported to Nintendo Switch in 2021.

The game functions as a vertical scrolling rhythm game with an accompanying story displayed in visual novel format. The visual novel features illustrations covering the two main female heroines, Tairitsu lit. 'conflict' and Hikari lit. 'light'. It is also considered a three-dimensional music video game, whose mechanics allow for uniquely challenging gameplay.

== Gameplay ==
Demonstration of Arcaea's gameplay style & mechanics. The game features 3D rhythm mechanics, especially on the Present, Future and Beyond difficulty levels. This screenshot showcases such mechanics in a song on Present difficulty.

The main gameplay of Arcaea uses three-dimensional chart lanes that are split into two parts: the top lane and the bottom lane. The bottom lane is divided into four and consists of two note types: floor notes and long notes. Floor notes are basic single-tap notes, and long notes require the player to hold them throughout their duration. The top lane has two different note types: arc notes that require the player to hold the note throughout its duration (arcs can vary in direction, including left, right, up, and down), and sky notes, which are floating single-tap notes. The Nintendo Switch version has an alternative mode with Joy-Con controls. The note types used differ with the selected difficulty: Past, Present, Future, Eternal, or Beyond. The game also presents a difficulty scale from 1 to 12, including "+" variants. Each player has a Potential score that increases based on the user's best performances.

As they play, users collect an in-game currency, fragments, which can be used to unlock more songs. Besides Music Play, the game includes other game modes. In World Mode, players progress through a grid to unlock songs and characters, referred to as partners. When selected, a partner can change some gameplay aspects, and its supporting statistics can be leveled up through playing using the partner or spending Ether Drops obtainable in World Mode. In Story Mode, players read storylines with the game's characters; sections of the story are unlocked by clearing specific songs. Course Mode features series of four songs each to be completed in a row, akin to boss rushes, to unlock special nameplates.

== Development ==
Arcaea began as a single-developer project by Anton Prydatko, inspired by Japanese arcade rhythm games. Prydatko had a background in iOS development at Dischan Media and Rakuten before starting Lowiro in 2016. Despite being founded in the UK, the Lowiro team prominently includes illustrators and musicians in Japan, where the majority of its player base is from, as well as employees in the US and Singapore.

Arcaea includes a variety of music styles in its track library, such as Vocaloid and traditional Eastern music. Many of the musicians involved in Arcaea are Japanese indie or doujin composers. The game also includes songs from professional composers, such as Swedish musician Rasmus Faber. Prydatko stated that the team leaned into creating original songs since the original launch rather than only license from popular media, as was common in rhythm games, to "surprise" players.

The levels were designed so that the difficulty would not strictly depend on each track’s genre or beats per minute. Floating "Arc" notes were implemented to add immersion in contrast to the simple 2D top-down design common in mobile rhythm games.

Lowiro often commissioned Japanese illustrators for the visuals to maintain cohesiveness in the style and worldbuilding. Japanese illustrator Cierra (シエラ) created the key visuals and early character and world designs. The idea to add a story mode was made late in development; Prydatko said that he and writer Terrence Smith aimed for a "very flexible and open-ended story" without borrowing "any direct inspiration". To achieve a balance between the gaming experience and plot, Prydatko told artists to arrange the track vocals, tempo, rhythm, and cover artwork to match the story's themes and characters.

Using a free-to-play model to remain the game accessible, it was important to the developers that the game's monetization method allow players to "own" their purchased content. Players can buy songs individually or in "packs" and play them an unlimited number of times, unlike the "stamina" model commonly used in mobile game monetization, which restricts play time. Arcaea's separate World Mode, where players can unlock new songs, limits progress via time-based "gates" to help "keep it fair", according to Prydatko.

== Release and update history ==
Arcaea Song Packs (mobile) Main Story packs bolded Side Story packs italicized
2017	Official Release
2017	**Eternal Core**
2017	Crimson Solace
2017	Memory Archive
2017	Dynamix Collaboration
2017	Ambivalent Vision
2017	**Vicious Labyrinth**
2018	Lanota Collaboration
2018	Binary Enfold
2018	**Luminous Sky**
2018	Tone Sphere Collaboration
2019	Groove Coaster Collaboration
2019	Absolute Reason
2019	CHUNITHM Collaboration
2019	**Adverse Prelude**
2019	Sunset Radiance
2020	**Black Fate**
2020	Extended Archive 1: Visions
2020	Ephemeral Page
2020	Ephemeral Page: The Journey Onwards
2020	O.N.G.E.K.I. Collaboration
2021	maimai Collaboration
2021	CHUNITHM Collaboration Chapter 2
2021	Esoteric Order
2021	Esoteric Order: Pale Tapestry
2021	Esoteric Order: Light of Salvation
2021	WACCA Collaboration
2021	Binary Enfold: Shared time
2021	Divided Heart
2021	Muse Dash Collaboration
2022	Lanota Collaboration Chapter 2
2022	**Final Verdict**
2022	**Final Verdict: Silent Answer**
2022	O.N.G.E.K.I. Collaboration Chapter 2
2023	Extend Archive 2: Chronicles
2023	maimai Collaboration Chapter 2
2023	CHUNITHM Collaboration Chapter 3
2023	Cytus II Collaboration
2023	Cytus II Collaboration Chapter 2
2023	**Lasting Eden**
2023	**Severed Eden**
2023	**Lasting/Severed Eden: Shifting Veil**
2023	WACCA Collaboration Chapter 2
2024	Extend Archive 3: Illusions
2024	Groove Coaster Collaboration Chapter 2
2024	**Absolute Nihil**
2024	Rotaeno Collaboration
2024	**Lucent Historia**
2024	O.N.G.E.K.I. Collaboration Chapter 3
2024	CHUNITHM Collaboration Chapter 4
2025	maimai Collaboration Chapter 3
2025	UNDERTALE Collaboration
2025	DJMAX Respect Collaboration
2025	Extant Anima
2025	Extant Anima: Chapter Experientia
2025	**Liminal Eclipse**
2025	World Extend 4: Emanations
2025	Arcaea: Next Stage
2026	MEGAREX Collaboration
2026	UNDERTALE Collaboration Chapter 2
2026	Virtual Singers
2026	**Divine Oblivion**
2026	Diverse System Collaboration
2026	Arknights Collaboration

Arcaea was released on the App Store and Google Play on 9 March 2017 and for the Nintendo Switch on 18 May 2021. While the mobile version is free with additional songs requiring in-app transactions, the Switch release is paid with some of those additional songs available with the base purchase. Due to the mobile version's live service model, it has received more frequent updates than on the offline Switch version.

On launch, the mobile game had about 20 songs and a paid song pack, "Eternal Core". It was the first of a series of packs that include content for the Story Mode's main plot; its first act was concluded with the release of the "Final Verdict" pack in version 4.0 on 13 July 2022. The version also introduced Course Mode. Act II of the main story began with the release of the "Severed Eden" pack in September 2023.

The main story was released alongside side stories featuring additional characters. Arcaea includes songs from collaborations with other rhythm games such as Lanota, Chunithm, and Cytus II, as well as series including Maimai and Groove Coaster. In 2025, a pack with songs from the soundtrack of Undertale was added, as well as a Camellia remix of "Megalovania" by Toby Fox. As of 2026, the game's library contains over 500 tracks.

== Reception ==
Eric Ford of TouchArcade says that it has "an awesome art style combined with very upbeat songs and a nice twist to the traditional rhythm formula". But he also mentioned that some of the gameplay elements could make the game potentially difficult.

Digitally Downloaded's Mike S. praised the game's aesthetic and music, and described its character art as "impeccable", though not memorable compared to other rhythm games. He disliked the game's requirements for unlocking new songs, considering them to be inappropriate for the game's paid release on the Nintendo Switch.

Dani Maddox of Siliconera said the game's music was "just amazing", with a large range of songs and genres. However, she found the game's story mode to be poor, and encountered issues with controls in the Nintendo Switch version, such as the console's size when playing in touchscreen mode and the game being "finicky" with a controller.
