= DJ Sharpnel =

Japanese musical collective

- Origin: Japan
- Genres: Speedcore, gabber, happy hardcore, mákina, trance, J-core, rave
- Years active: 1996–present
- Label: SHARPNELSOUND (indie)
- Members: Jea; Lemmy
- Website: sharpnel.com

DJ Sharpnel is a Japanese music duo composed of Jea and Lemmy, who are signed under their independent record label SHARPNELSOUND. They are credited for pioneering the J-core genre, recognized for their speedcore, gabber, happy hardcore and trance productions.

== History ==
=== Beginnings and style ===
The beginnings of DJ Sharpnel came in 1996 when Jea, Tanigon and Viscon formed Project Gabbangelion and started to release music in MOD format across forums and BBS pages. In 1998, after Project Gabbangelion disbanded, 高速音楽隊シャープネル (High Speed Music Team Sharpnel) was formed by Jea and La-Quebrata, with three other members Lemmy, Quebradora and JunQ joining soon after its creation. "Sharpnel vs Project Gabbangelion" was the first release under SHARPNELSOUND, shown first as a cover only demonstration at SPEEDKING Vol.2, and officially releasing later in 1998 at Sega Hardcore Generation. High Speed Music Team Sharpnel released six full albums between 1998 and 2000. In 2000 the group was disbanded and Jea and Lemmy formed the "DJ Sharpnel" unit.

DJ Sharpnel's active contribution to the Japanese underground hardcore techno scene has helped form a new genre of music known as J-core. Although DJ Sharpnel never describes Lemmy as a DJ or producer, she has created several songs, such as those listed on SRPC-0004. The style of DJ Sharpnel’s music differs from that of other hardcore artists. Its aggressive overtones are often brightened up with sped-up Japanese popular music or spoken voice samples from various anime. These are also often fused with more Western influences, such as lyrics from American hip hop music and cartoons.

Much of the sales of SHARPNELSOUND records, as well as management of the Hardrave online radio station and promotion of SHARPNELSOUND events, was done through Guhroovy, a primarily hardcore record store located in Shibuya and operated by Akira Uchibori (Guhroovy). Aside from their prolific discography on the SHARPNELSOUND label, DJ Sharpnel has also provided tracks for other Japanese labels such as Maddest Chickn’dom, Ravin Beatz Japan, and Gabba Disco.

=== Aliases ===
DJ Sharpnel has used various artist names throughout their releases, depending on the specific style of the track or album. The main aliases are "DJ Sharpnel" (standard hardcore and happy hardcore style, with Lemmy) and "Killingscum" (terrorcore, speedcore, and breakcore style, with just Jea). Sharpnel.net is the name for the collaborative "performance project" of the SHARPNELSOUND label, with Jea as live DJ and Lemmy as live VJ. Although, according to their MySpace page, DJ Sharpnel is the name on the produced albums, Killingscum is occasionally credited to tracks, separating Jea from Lemmy. In addition to Killingscum, Jea also uses "DJ Jea" as a solo alias when he performs hardstyle music and tracks related to the SPRH series and "DJ Attackerz" when creating trance.

Other group aliases have been used when Jea and Lemmy collaborated with other artists prior to the creation of the DJ Sharpnel name, such as Project Gabbangelion (which included Jea, Viscion, and Tangion) and High Speed Music Team Sharpnel (which included Jea, La-Quebrata, Jun-Q, Quebradora, and Lemmy). Still other albums are credited to "DJ Sharpnel & V.A" indicating that various other artists produced tracks on the album.

The name "DJ Sharpnel" is commonly used to refer to any combination of musicians led by Jea (with or without Lemmy), even those prior to 2000 and those on albums not associated with the SHARPNELSOUND label.

=== Influence ===
Due to DJ Sharpnel's extended time and dedication to the J-Core music scene (as well as the increased popularity of anime in the West), Western recognition of Japanese hardcore has increased. Many up-and-coming new music artists have acknowledged DJ Sharpnel's influence, including DJ Zaiaku, T2Kazuya, Spy47 and Shingo DJ.

== Discography ==
DJ Sharpnel's discography is very large, tallying to over 53 albums to which the duo has contributed (although not always together) and at least 10 albums in which they are the primary or sole contributor. Below is the primary discography associated with the SHARPNELSOUND label, with DJ Sharpnel as the primary artist (albeit with varying aliases used throughout). For most albums in the SRPC series until SRPC-0025, there were two versions released. First, a CDr version released at Comiket and other events, and later a pressed CD version to be distributed to shops. The CDr versions are produced in smaller quantities and are therefore rarer, and usually have a track list differing somewhat from the final pressed version.

Official SHARPNELSOUND SRPC Series
Number	Title	Date	Notes
SRPC-0001	Sharpnel vs Project Gabbangelion	1998-07-30	
SRPC-0002	ダブル ダッチ (Double Dutch)	1998-10-20	Sold exclusively at M3-1998 Fall then withdrawn due to the group's dissatisfaction with the content. Approximately 40 copies were made. The master files were subsequently lost in a hard drive crash.
SRPC-0002.5	フロム・ザ・ハート (From the Heart)	1998-11-07	Extremely limited release sold at Hardcore Major League Vol. 7. Approximately 5 to 10 copies were made.
SRPC-0003	フロム・ザ・はあと 地獄編 ( From The Heart Hell Compilation)	1998-12-30	
SRPC-0004	アタック ザ シャープネル (Attack The Sharpnel)	1999-08-15	Two-CD album.
SRPC-0005	レイヴ☆スペクター (Rave☆Specter)	1999-12-26	
SRPC-0006	Endless Summer	2000-08-13	Originally released in a DVD case then repackaged to a standard jewel case for the pressed CD version.
SRPC-0007	Genesis:0	2000-12-30	Under "新世紀ガヴァンゲリオン (Neon Genesis Gabbangelion)" alias.
SRPC-0008	S.E.X. -Sound of EXtreme-	2001-08-12	First album under "DJ Sharpnel" alias. Lemmy stops producing, Jea takes over all music production.
SRPC-0009	p2p. ピアッツーピアッ! (P2P Peer-To-Peer!)	2001-12-30	
SRPC-0010	X-Rated -クロスレートっ!- (X-Rated -Cross Rate!-)	2002-08-11	
SRPC-0011	Early Style of Otakuspeedvibe 1996⮕1998	2002-10-18	All songs on this album were originally released in 1996 by Project Gabbangelion.
SRPC-0012	PPPH! Phat, Pinky, Powerful & Hard!!	2002-12-30	
SRPC-0013	Anime Gabba it!	2003-08-17	
SRPC-0014	No Style? No Policy!?	2003-12-12	Under Jea's "Killingscum" alias.
SRPC-0015	シャープネルサウンドコレクション壱 (SHARPNELSOUND Collection)	2004-05-02	Collection of earlier tracks.
SRPC-0016	悩殺! ハードブレイク (Bewitching! Hardbreak)	2004-08-15	
SRPC-0017	UG☆Psyclone	2004-12-30	
SRPC-0018	Yonderdome The Megamixxx Of SHARPNELSOUND 1-7! (ヨンダードーム)	2005-08-14	Mix CD of tracks from the first 7 albums, mixed under Jea's "Killingscum" alias.
SRPC-0019	Mad Breaks (マッドブレイクス)	2005-08-14	
SRPC-0020	Brain Violation. (感脳侵食)	2006-08-13	
SRPC-0021	オタクオーバークロックス21 (Otaku Overclocks 21)	2006-12-31	
SRPC-0022	ランニング★★★オールナイトッ!! (Running All Night)	2007-12-31	
SRPC-0023	二次元サティスファクション (2 Dimensional Satisfaction)	2008-08-16	
SRPC-0024	妄殺オタクティクス (Delusion O-Tactics)	2009-08-15	
SRPC-0025	シャープネルサウンドコレクション弐 (SHARPNELSOUND Collection Volume 2)	2009-12-30	Second collection of previously released SHARPNELSOUND songs.
SRPC-0026	Cyclick (サイクリック)	2010-08-14	
SRPC-0027	危ないベースライン (Bassline Crisis)	2011-08-13	
SRPC-0028	Yonderdome Decade - 10 Years Of DJ Sharpnel -	2011-12-31	50 track mix CD of tracks from SRPC-0008-SRPC-0027.
SRPC-0029	Welcome To The Ottack Universe (ウェルカムトゥザオタックユニバース)	2012-08-11	
SRPC-0030	Otakuspeedvibe	2013-08-12	Final album released under the SRPC main series.
SRPC-C001	What A Happy Life & Death!	2002-07-19	First album released under DJ Sharpnel's Cotton Pantie's alias.
SRPC-C002	My Sweet Honey Biscuit! (マイ スイートハニー ビスケット！)	2002-09-08	Second album released under DJ Sharpnel's Cotton Pantie's alias.
SRPC-H001	Life Is Game	2003-05-05	First album in the DJ Jea Hardrave series. Released under "DJ Sharpnel Feat. DJ Jea"
SRPC-H003	Harddrive 150 BPM - Life Is Game Volume 2.0	2005-25-01	
SRPC-L001	Allright, Biaaatch !!! - A Street-Trash Megamix of Hardcore Classics	2002-03-01	DJ Megamix by The Speed Freak
SRPC-L002	Shockwave Greatest Hits Megamix 1994-2002	2002-04-28	DJ Megamix by The Speed Freak from tracks 1.1 to 1.16
SRPC-L003	Noisecore Vol. 01 - A Radical Hardcore Mix	2002-03-01	This mix is a vinyl-mix done by The Speed Freak for Street-Trash Alliance. Recorded and mixed @ V_Biosfear 3. [from official website] Delivered in plastic sleeve.
SRPC-L004	Gabberdisco Megamix	2002-08-11	This time it's not about being the hardest - it's about having fun !!! [on cover] This is a digital mix done by The Speed Freak for Street-Trash Alliance. Recorded and mixed @ V_Biosfear 3. [from official website] Delivered in plastic sleeve.
SRPC-L005	Speedcore Dandy	2002-08	
SRPC-L006	Demons To Some, Angels To Others - Hardcore-Mix 11-2007	2007-12-31	
SRPC-L007	Break It Oldschool - 100% Classic Breakbeats	2007-12-31	
SRPC-M001	Hardstyle 4Da Firsttime	2002-12-07	Total duration of the mix on disc 1 is 76:17. The 2nd disc contains a video file in .MPEG format.
SRPC-M002	Now Or Never	2002-12-30	Spelling errors on the release: 01. Bassalert - Dewegwijer 02. The Viper - X-Teminate 06. The Macochist - No Newstyle 07. DJ Promo - Harrucaine Brain 08. Neophte &Stuneed Guys - There Is No Other 10. Bodylotion - Neighborhood Crime 11. Nightraver - We Are Rotterdam (Evilactivities Rmx) 12. Evilactivities - X-Tinction 13. Neophte &Stuneed Guys - Nation Of Domination; The Alienator and MC Ruffian are uncredited on this mix for the track G-Core. Instead the info is taken from other releases.
SRPC-M003	Hardstyle Tokyo Night Cruisin'	2003-05-04	
SRPM004	J-Core Revolution		Mix CD mixed by DJ Yousuke. No artist names are included on the tracklist.
SRPE-0001	Erectortion-01 - キモチイイコト	2009-10-11	
SRPE-0002	Erectortion-02 - 誘惑催眠ガール	2011-10-30	
SRPK-0001	No Style? No Policy!?	2003-12-30	Shorter mini-album version of SRPC-0014
SRPK-0002	暴走歌謡大全集	2004-05-02	Released by 音圧愚連隊 (Sound Pressure Gangsta)
SRPK-0003 / MSTCD004	爆萌電波注意報!	2009-12-30	Released by 音圧愚連隊 (Sound Pressure Gangsta) on SHARPNELSOUND and Mob Squad Tokyo.
SRPD-0001	Invisible Trigger	2013-12-31	Track 18 is incorrectly tagged as Speed Disco Vol.1 on the album's track list. Track 20 is incorrectly tagged as Yanyan Speeddisco Vol.3 on the album's track list.
SRPX-0001	Ver1.0	2013-12-31	Free CDr that comes with Invisible Trigger

== See also ==
- Hardcore Techno
- J-core
