= List of electronic music genres =

This is a list of electronic music genres, consisting of genres of electronic music, primarily created with electronic musical instruments or electronic music technology. A distinction has been made between sound produced using electromechanical means and that produced using electronic technology. Examples of electromechanical sound producing devices include the telharmonium, Hammond organ, electric piano, and the electric guitar. Purely electronic sound production can be achieved using devices such as the theremin, sound synthesizer, and computer. Genre, however, is not always dependent on instrumentation.

In its early development, electronic music was associated almost exclusively with Western art music, but from the late 1960s, the availability of affordable music technology—particularly of synthesizers—meant that music produced using electronic means became increasingly common in the popular domains of rock and pop music and classical music, resulting in major electronically based subgenres. After the definition of MIDI in 1982 and the development of digital audio, the creation of purely electronic sounds and their manipulation became much simpler. As a result, synthesizers came to dominate the pop music of the early 1980s. In the late 1980s, electronic dance music (EDM) records made using only electronic instruments became increasingly popular, resulting in a proliferation of electronic genres, subgenres, and scenes.

== Genres ==
- Ambient
  - Ambient dub
  - Dark ambient
    - Ambient industrial
    - Dungeon synth
    - Isolationism
  - Dreampunk
  - Illbient
  - New-age
    - Neoclassical new-age
    - Space music
- Bass music
  - Dubstep
    - Brostep
  - Moombahcore
    - Post-dubstep
    - Reggaestep
    - Riddim
  - Footwork
  - Future bass
    - Kawaii future bass
  - Jungle terror
  - Midtempo bass
  - Trap (EDM)
  - UK bass
  - Wave
    - Hardwave
- Breakbeat
  - Acid breaks
  - Baltimore club
    - Jersey club
    - Philly club
  - Big beat
  - Breakbeat hardcore
    - Darkcore
    - Hardcore breaks
  - Broken beat
  - Florida breaks
  - Nu skool breaks
  - Progressive breaks
  - Psychedelic breakbeat
- Chill-out
  - Downtempo
  - Psybient
    - Psydub
  - Trip hop
  - Trip rock
- Disco fusion genres
  - Afro/cosmic music
  - Electro-disco
    - Hi-NRG
      - Eurobeat
      - Eurodance
        - Italo dance
    - Italo disco
      - Spacesynth
    - Space disco
  - Eurodisco
  - Nu-disco
  - Post-disco
    - Boogie
    - City pop
    - Pop kreatif
- Drum and bass
  - Darkstep
  - Drumfunk
  - Drumstep
  - Hardstep
  - Intelligent drum and bass
    - Atmospheric drum and bass
  - Jazzstep
  - Jump-up
  - Liquid funk
  - Neurofunk
  - Sambass
  - Techstep
- Dub
  - Dub poetry
- Electronic dance music
  - Christian electronic dance music
- Electronic rock
  - Dance-rock
    - Alternative dance
      - Baggy (Madchester)
      - New rave
    - Dance-punk
  - Electronic pop
    - Dance-pop
      - Freestyle
      - Disco polo
    - Hyperpop
    - Sophisti-pop
    - Synth-pop
      - Electroclash
        - Electropop
    - Wonky pop
  - Indietronica
  - Krautrock
  - New wave
    - Cold wave
    - Dark wave
      - Neoclassical dark wave
      - Neue Deutsche Todeskunst
    - Ethereal wave
      - Nu-gaze
    - Minimal wave
    - Neue Deutsche Welle
    - New romantic
  - Post-rock
  - Space rock
  - Synth-metal
    - Electrogrind
    - Electronicore
  - Synth-punk
- Electronica
  - Folktronica
  - Live electronic (Livetronica)
    - Laptronica
  - Nu jazz (Jazztronica)
  - Progressive electronic
    - Berlin School
    - Kosmische musik
- Ethnic electronica and regional EDM
  - Asian Underground
  - African EDM
    - Afrobeats
      - Azonto
    - Coupé-décalé
    - Kuduro
    - Mahraganat
    - Shangaan electro
  - Budots
  - Changa tuki
  - Dancehall pop
  - Denpa music
  - Guaracha (EDM)
  - Funk carioca
    - Funk melody
    - Funk ostentação
    - Proibidão
    - Rasteirinha
  - Merenhouse
  - Nortec
  - Rabòday
  - Rara tech
  - Russ music
  - Shamstep
  - Tecnocumbia
  - Tribal guarachero
  - Worldbeat
    - Manila sound
- Experimental electronic
  - Black MIDI
  - Deconstructed club
  - Drone
  - Electroacoustic music
    - Acousmatic music
    - Electroacoustic improvisation
    - Musique concrète
    - Soundscape
  - Glitch
  - Microsound
  - Noise music
    - Danger music
    - Japanoise
    - Harsh noise
      - Harsh noise wall
    - Power electronics
      - Death industrial
    - Power noise
  - Plunderphonics
    - Sampledelia
  - Reductionism
    - Lowercase
    - Onkyokei
- Funk fusion genres
  - Funktronica
  - Synth-funk
- Hard dance
  - Hard NRG
  - Hardstyle
    - Dubstyle
    - Euphoric frenchcore
    - Euphoric hardstyle
    - Rawstyle
    - Trapstyle
  - Jumpstyle
  - Lento violento
  - Mákina
- Hardcore
  - Bouncy techno
  - Breakcore
    - Raggacore
    - Mashcore
  - Digital hardcore
  - Frenchcore
  - Gabber
    - Early hardcore
    - Mainstream hardcore
  - Happy hardcore
    - UK hardcore
  - Industrial hardcore
  - J-core
  - Speedcore
    - Extratone
    - Flashcore
    - Splittercore
- Hauntology
  - Chillwave
  - Hypnagogic pop
  - Synthwave
    - Darksynth
    - Sovietwave
  - Vaporwave
    - Future funk
    - Hardvapour
    - Mallsoft
- Hip-hop fusion genres
  - Afroswing
  - Alternative hip-hop
    - Hipster hop
  - Cloud rap
  - Crunk
    - Crunkcore
    - Snap music
  - Electro
  - Emo rap
  - Glitch hop
  - Instrumental hip-hop
  - Jerk
  - Lofi hip-hop
  - Miami bass
  - Mumble rap
  - Trap
    - Afro trap
    - Drill
      - Brooklyn drill
      - UK drill
    - Latin trap
    - Phonk
      - Drift phonk
      - Brazilian phonk
    - Plugg
    - UK trap
- House music
  - Acid house
  - Afro house
    - Afro tech
    - Amapiano
    - Kidandali
  - Ambient house
  - Balearic beat
  - Ballroom
  - Bass house
  - Brazilian bass
    - Slap house
  - Blog house
  - Chicago hard house
  - Chicago house
  - Deep house
  - Disco house
  - Diva house
    - Hardbag
  - Electro house
    - Big room house
      - Future rave
    - Complextro
    - Dutch house
    - Fidget house
    - Melbourne bounce
  - Electro swing
  - Eurohouse
  - French house
  - Funky house
  - Future house
  - Garage house
  - Ghetto house
    - Ghettotech
    - Juke house
  - Gqom
  - Hip house
    - Electro hop
  - Italo house
  - Jackin house
  - Jazz house
  - Kwaito
  - Latin house
  - Melodic house
  - Microhouse
  - Moombahton
    - Moombahsoul
  - New Jersey sound
  - Outsider house
    - Lo-fi house
  - Progressive house
  - Soulful house
  - Stadium house
  - Tech house
  - Tribal house
  - Tropical house
  - Trouse
  - UK hard house
    - Pumping house
      - Hardbass
    - Scouse house
- Industrial and post-industrial
  - Electro-industrial
    - Dark electro
      - Aggrotech
  - Electronic body music (EBM)
    - Futurepop
    - New beat
  - Industrial hip-hop
  - Industrial metal
    - Cyber metal
    - Neue Deutsche Härte
  - Industrial rock
  - Martial industrial
  - Witch house
- Intelligent dance music (IDM)
  - Algorave
  - Drill 'n' bass
- Jungle
  - Ragga jungle
- R&B and soul fusion genres
  - Alternative R&B
  - Contemporary R&B
  - Neo soul
  - New jack swing
- Techno
  - Acid techno
  - Ambient techno
  - Birmingham sound
  - Bleep techno
  - Detroit techno
  - Dub techno
  - Hard techno
    - Free tekno
      - Jungletek
      - Raggatek
  - Industrial techno
  - Minimal techno
  - Schaffel
  - Toytown techno
- Trance music
  - Acid trance
  - Balearic trance
  - Dream trance
  - Eurotrance
    - Hands up
  - Goa trance
    - Nitzhonot
  - Hard trance
  - Progressive trance
  - Psychedelic trance
    - Dark psytrance
    - Full-on
    - Minimal psytrance
    - Progressive psytrance
    - Suomisaundi
  - Tech trance
  - Uplifting trance
  - Vocal trance
- UK garage
  - 2-step garage
  - Bassline
  - Breakstep
  - Future garage
  - Grime
    - Grindie
  - Speed garage
  - UK funky
    - Funkstep
  - Wonky
- Video game music
  - Chiptune
    - Bitpop
    - Skweee
    - Nintendocore
  - FM synthesis
  - Sequencer music

== Remix derivatives ==
- Chopped and screwed
- Disco edits
- Nightcore
- Tecno brega
- Weird SoundCloud

== Broader genre groups ==
- Electronic dance music
  - Christian electronic dance music
- Rave music

== See also ==
- Ishkur's Guide to Electronic Music
- List of electronic music festivals
- List of electronic musicians
- Dance music
- List of hip-hop genres
- List of industrial music genres
- List of trance genres
- Styles of house music
- List of subcultures
- Timeline of electronic music genres
