= Ishmael Ensemble =

- Origin: Bristol, UK
- Genres: Jazz; avant-garde jazz; astral jazz; trip hop; psychedelic dub
- Years active: 2017–present
- Label: Severn Songs
- Website: www.ishmaelensemble.com

Ishmael Ensemble is a British musical collective from Bristol, founded and led by producer and saxophonist Pete Cunningham. The group's name is a reference to the narrator of Herman Melville’s novel Moby-Dick.

Ishmael Ensemble's music blends experimental jazz with electronic genres, drawing on influences from trip-hop, dub, and UK club culture. In a review for its "Contemporary Album of the Month" award, the Guardian described their sound as a mix of "astral jazz, burbling electronica, trippy minimalism, psychedelic dub and 20 years of club culture". In a review from 2019, the Wire accessed the band as "seemingly capable of doing anything, yet remaining fleet footedly themselves throughout."

Originally a bedroom recording project, the group has established itself on the contemporary jazz scene in the United Kingdom. Their debut album, "A State of Flow", released in 2019, explored sonic landscapes ranging from cinematic textures to psychedelic influences. It was met with critical praise, earning the title of "Contemporary Album of the Month" from The Guardian and "Jazz Album of the Month" from Mojo.

Their second album, "Visions of Light", was released in 2021 and received significant acclaim. The LP was named "Album of the Year" by Huey Morgan on BBC Radio 6 Music. "Mojo" praised it as “flawless astral jazz with dance floor savvy".

The band's third LP "Rituals" was released in 2024 and its 12 pieces expanded the band's sound with more song-based structures and psychedelic arrangements.

Ishmael Ensemble has toured internationally, with performances in Mexico and the United States, including a feature at the New York Winter Jazz Festival. They have also appeared at major festivals such as Glastonbury.
