= TPZ =

TPZ may refer to:

- Tirapazamine, experimental anticancer drug
- Tula Cartridge Works (Tulskiy Patronniy Zavod), Russian ammunition manufacturer
- TPz Fuchs, armoured personnel carrier developed by Daimler-Benz
- t+pazolite, Japanese electronic musician
