= Yunyun Syndrome!? Rhythm Psychosis =

2026 rhythm adventure video game

- Developers: WSS playground; WHO YOU
- Publishers: WSS playground; Alliance Arts
- Director: Fuyuki Hayashi
- Platform: Windows
- Release: April 24, 2026
- Genres: Rhythm, adventure, denpa
- Mode: Single-player

Yunyun Syndrome!? Rhythm Psychosis (Japanese: ゆんゆん電波シンドローム) is a 2026 denpa-inspired rhythm adventure video game developed by WSS playground and WHO YOU, and published by WSS playground and Alliance Arts for Microsoft Windows. The game was directed and written by Fuyuki Hayashi, previously known for his work on Monark and Crymachina. Players take the role of Qtie, a hikikomori girl who becomes consumed by denpa music and the fictional character Yunyun, spreading conspiratorial posts across the internet. A demo for the game was released in February 2026 as part of IGN Fan Fest and accumulated over 150,000 downloads.

== Gameplay ==
In-game screenshot, demonstrating the game interface. Yunyun appears on the monitor screen in the top-right, while Qtie's three resource gauges (DOKIDOKI, YUNYUN, and HYPE) are displayed in the score panel beside her. Desktop icons on the left provide access to activities such as Denpa Transmissions (rhythm game) and Room Search, and dialogue between Qtie and Yunyun is shown in the text window at the bottom.

Yunyun Syndrome!? Rhythm Psychosis centers on a four-lane beatmap rhythm game loop. Players press buttons assigned to each lane as notes scroll toward the bottom of the screen and, as they accumulate hits, Qtie generates text posts that other internet users interpret as various conspiracy theories, which in turn fill a "denpa gauge" that Yunyun is attempting to charge in order to "save" Qtie.

After clearing a song, players select from a set of "shitpost cards" labelled dokidoki, yunyun, or hype, which correspond to three personal gauges for the protagonist. These gauges can be expended for various effects: spending half of the dokidoki gauge allows Qtie to call her mother for more energy drinks, spending half of the yunyun gauge activates an idle mode in which songs play at random for fifteen minutes, and spending half of the hype gauge lets the player choose which specific conspiracy theory to trigger next. Playing songs and triggering conspiracies increases the denpa gauge, forming the game's central progression loop. Difficulty options range from a beginner tier to a "No-Lifer" difficulty for hardcore rhythm game players.

The base game includes eleven tracks, with additional songs available through downloadable content. The soundtrack draws from Touhou Project fan music, tracks from the eroge label Frontwing, works by artists such as KOTOKO and ave;new, and two songs from the soundtrack of Needy Streamer Overload. The game also contains multiple endings tied to player choices and conspiracy trends, as well as meta-narrative elements and hidden content accessible through Qtie's in-game computer.

== Setting ==
The game's protagonist is Qtie (キュちゃん), a hikikomori who has become obsessively devoted to Yunyun, a demon girl character from a fictional game called Execution Angel Guiltina. As a result of this fixation, Yunyun appears to Qtie directly and sets out to "save" her, communicating through denpa songs. Qtie's posts online, written in an excited state induced by the music, are interpreted by other internet users as bizarre conspiracy theories. As the story progresses, players gain access to diary entries and other files saved on Qtie's computer that reveal details about her background, including what the game depicts as an unhealthy relationship with her mother.

The game draws on the denpa subgenre, which originated as a term for people mentally incompatible with normal society before being adopted by counter-cultural artists working in visual novels, horror media, and music. Denpa songs are characterized by bizarre, catchy melodies intended to capture the feeling of estrangement from society.

== Development ==
Yunyun Syndrome!? Rhythm Psychosis was directed and written by Fuyuki Hayashi under his studio WHO YOU, in collaboration with WSS playground, which previously published Needy Streamer Overload. In an interview with Noisy Pixel, Hayashi described the game as originating from a personal experience during a difficult period in his life, during which denpa music helped him cope. "Denpa songs often feature energetic lyrics about love, and I think that feeling of being loved is what saved me," he said, adding that listening to them would cause him to write late into the night. He described the game's core development team as consisting of himself and a longtime collaborator who served as the sole programmer, scriptwriter, and designer.

Hayashi stated that his earlier games, which are frequently described as dark and philosophical, were made with the intention of helping players who relate to difficult circumstances, in the same way that video games helped him during his own dark periods. He cited working alongside writers Naoki Hisaya and Aya Nishitani as an influence on his creative development beyond this project specifically. On the decision to make the game a rhythm title rather than a narrative adventure, Hayashi said that the experience of writing intensely while listening to music was the direct origin of the concept, and that incorporating licensed denpa tracks felt natural as a result, since the songs symbolize "the possibility of love that comes from the 2D and the fictional."

The game was announced in May 2024 at INDIE Live Expo. It was originally slated for release in October 2025 before being delayed first to winter 2025 and then to April 2026. The game launched on Steam on April 23, 2026 (at 9 PM Pacific Time), corresponding to April 24 in most of the world.

Upon release, the English localization of the game drew scrutiny from players who noted that numerous lines had been translated in ways that dramatically altered or contradicted their original Japanese meaning. Director Fuyuki Hayashi acknowledged the criticism in a statement, attributing some of the issues to the fast pace of development and to portions of the English text reflecting outdated versions of the Japanese script. A patch released on October 1, 2026 substantially revised the English translation.

== Reception ==
Reception

Aggregate score
Aggregator	Score
Metacritic	78/100

Review score
Publication	Score
Shacknews	7/10

Yunyun Syndrome!? Rhythm Psychosis received generally favorable reviews from critics, according to the review aggregation website Metacritic. Yunyun Syndrome!? Rhythm Psychosis received a "Very Positive" rating on Steam following its release.

PC Gamer covered the game positively ahead of release, describing its track list as a "who's-who of big hardcore composers" in the denpa and arcade rhythm game space. Shacknews published a review describing the game as offering "denpa derangement and sick tunes". Tech-Gaming described it as a chaotic and compelling rhythm game built around denpa culture, mixing catchy tracks with satirical elements.
