= Mad Rat Dead =

2020 video game

- Developer: Nippon Ichi Software
- Publishers: JP: Nippon Ichi Software; WW: NIS America
- Director: Yu Mizokami
- Designer: Yu Mizokami
- Programmers: Kazuma Osaka; Makoto Ito
- Artists: Mio Katsumata; Takuya Oshima; Akio Fujita
- Writers: Yuya Hosono; Tatsuya Fujimoto; Takahiro Kumamoto
- Composers: Kazuya Takasu; Dyes Iwasaki; Camellia; a_hisa; Zizz Studio
- Platforms: Nintendo Switch; PlayStation 4
- Release: JP: October 29, 2020; WW: October 30, 2020
- Genres: Platform, rhythm game
- Mode: Single-player

Mad Rat Dead (マッドラットデッド, Maddo Ratto Deddo) is a rhythm platform video game developed and published by Nippon Ichi Software. The story follows a laboratory rat with the ability to rewind time; players use a variety of moves to the beat of the music to safely reach the end of each stage before running out of time. Mad Rat Dead was released for Nintendo Switch and PlayStation 4 in October 2020, with NIS America publishing the game outside of Japan.

It received generally positive reviews on release, with critics praising its music and visuals, but story and level design drew mixed response.

== Gameplay ==
Mad Rat Dead is a rhythm-based platform game in which players control Mad Rat in time to the beat of the music, with the goal of making it safely to the end of each stage. Mad Rat is able to dash forward, jump, drop downwards, and perform a dance to charge up a super dash, as well as perform homing attacks on enemies known as Nightmares. If Mad Rat dies by colliding with an enemy or deadly obstacle, the player can rewind time to restart at a chosen point before death (players can also rewind time on command). However, the game will end if the player fails to reach the end of the stage before a timer runs out. Stages that are cleared in story mode can be replayed with any unlocked music tracks, allowing them to be played at different speeds depending on the music. Additionally, stages can be played in Hard Mode, which adds additional beats that need to be hit.

== Story ==
The story follows a lab rat who has just died after being experimented on by a human scientist. Approached by an entity called the Rat God, the rat is given the ability to rewind time and relive his last 24 hours to fulfil his dream to get revenge on the scientist who killed him. After going back in time and escaping his cage, the rat discovers he has a talking heart named Heart, who dubs him "Mad Rat" upon hearing his goal. As Mad Rat follows the Rat God's advice to "follow the cheese", Mad Rat finds the scientist and seemingly kills him. However, this is all revealed to be a delusion, which Heart snaps Mad Rat out of just before he can be killed by a cat. Finding themselves in the woods, Mad Rat and Heart head back towards the city, learning that other rats are being led to their death by the supposed Rat God, before the pair is rescued from the cat by a little girl.

As Mad Rat's bond with Heart deepens and he becomes more mature, he ends up using his rewind ability to save the cat and rescue the little girl from being hit by a truck. After returning to the lab and, depending on the player's choice, deciding to either kill or spare the scientist, Mad Rat feels ready to die. However, the Rat God forcibly rewinds time to earlier in the morning so that he can die by being eaten by a cat, undoing everything that Mad Rat had done to leave his mark on the world. It is then that Mad Rat learns that Heart is not his own heart, but in fact a heart from another animal that he received in a failed heart transplant that resulted in both their deaths. Mad Rat attempts to rewind time to stop the experiment from happening and save Heart, but the Rat God stops him, revealing herself to be a parasite (implied to be Toxoplasma gondii), transmitted via the transplant, that can only reproduce by leading rats to cats. After Mad Rat and Heart defeat the Rat God, Mad Rat rewinds time to before the experiment and frees Heart, who is revealed to have been a cat all along. Feeling himself dying, Mad Rat encourages Heart to escape the lab so he can save the cat and girl that he had saved before, but Heart chooses to rewind time once more so that he can bring Mad Rat along with him and spend what little time they have left together.

== Development ==
Mad Rat Dead was designed by Yu Mizokami, creator of the 2015 survival horror game Yomawari: Night Alone, and its sequels. According to her, the project was conceived before the release of Yomawari, but was shelved for a while. Nippon Ichi Software first revealed the game in June 2020 with October 29, 2020 release date. Participating composers were also announced, alongside the first images of the upcoming title. The worldwide release through NIS America was confirmed later that day, with plans to publish the game on October 30, 2020 in North America and Europe, and on November 6, 2020 in Oceania.

=== Music ===
The game's soundtrack was composed and performed by several artists: a_hisa, Dyes Iwasaki, Camellia, ZIZZ STUDIO (You Ooyama, Kouichi Sakita / xaki, Yoshihiro Kawagoe), and Nippon Ichi Software's sound director Kazuya Takasu. The soundtrack is included on CD with the Japanese special edition of the game, while the Western special edition featured the soundtrack in digital format, as well as on a cassette tape. The soundtracks Volume One and Two were released on the "Nippon1.jpショップ" (Shop) site as stand alone soundtracks; a 3-CD set and 1-CD set, respectively.

== Reception ==
Reception

Aggregate score
Aggregator	Score
Metacritic	(Switch) 79/100 (PS4) 69/100

Review scores
Publication	Score
Hardcore Gamer	3.5/5
Nintendo Life	8/10
PlayStation Lifestyle	6.5/10

Upon release, Mad Rat Dead received "generally favorable" reviews for Nintendo Switch version, and "mixed or average" reviews for PlayStation 4 version, according to review aggregator Metacritic. Nintendo Life praised the game for its soundtrack and visual design, while Hardcore Gamer noted that the game "controls like a dream and uses your hands, ears and eyes to their fullest." However, aspects such as the game's story and gameplay received more mixed reviews. While Nintendo Life praised the satisfying gameplay loop, PlayStation Lifestyle found the game's regular levels to be quite repetitive. PlayStation Lifestyle additionally calls the story dull and states that it "loses momentum quite quickly".
