= Shiki Aoki =

Japanese actor

- 青木 志貴
- Born: January 14, 1990 (age 36)
- Occupations: Actor; voice actor
- Years active: 2013-present
- Agent: KD Entertainment

YouTube information
- Channel: Shiki Aoki
- Years active: 2018–present
- Genre: Beauty
- Subscribers: 137 thousand
- Views: 18 million
- Last updated: 2 August 2025
- Website: www.mikipro.co.jp/talent/tarent_profile/aokishiki.html

Shiki Aoki (青木 志貴, Aoki Shiki; born January 14, 1990) is a Japanese actor, voice actor, model, and fashion designer.

== Personal life ==
On March 6, 2020, Aoki publicly came out as a transgender man after initially identifying as non-binary, as well as pansexual.

== Filmography ==
=== Television ===
Year	Title	Role	Network	Note
2016	Cardfight!! Vanguard G: NEXT	Makoto Asada	TV Tokyo	
2017	The Idolmaster Cinderella Girls Theater	Asuka Ninomiya	Tokyo MX, BS11, Saga TV	
2017	Cardfight!! Vanguard G: Z	Makoto Asada	TV Tokyo	
2018	Real Girl	Kaoru Tsutsui	NTV	
2018	Voice of Fox	Yushin	Tokyo MX	
2019	True Cooking Master Boy	Leon (Childhood)	MBS	
2021	Edens Zero	Homura Kōgetsu	NTV	
2023	Sorcerous Stabber Orphen: Chaos in Urbanrama	Lottecia	AT-X	
2023	Reborn as a Vending Machine, I Now Wander the Dungeon	Hulemy	Tokyo MX	
2023	Helck	Asuta	NTV	
2023	Stardust Telepath	Matataki Raimon	AT-X	
2024	Tasūketsu	Rika Suzuki	NTV	
2025	#Compass 2.0: Combat Providence Analysis System	Lyrica	TBA	

=== Original net animation ===
Year	Title	Role	Streamed by	Note
2021	High-Rise Invasion	Mayuko Nise	Netflix	

=== Game ===
Year	Title	Role	Notes
2016	Compass	Magical Girl Lilika	
2017	The Idolmaster Cinderella Girls	Asuka Ninomiya	
2018	The King of Fighters All Star	Chris, Orochi	
2019	Gyakuten Othellonia	Volpia	
2019	Cinderella Nine	Runa Kusakari	
2020	WACCA Lily	Lily	
2021	Fate/Grand Order	Jacques de Molay	
2022	Arknights	Dagda	

=== Theatre ===
Year	Title	Role	Notes
2017	Premium 3D Musical: The Legend of Heroes: Trails of Cold Steel	Angelica Rogner	
2017	Embryo		
2018	Karaoke Sentai Seiyuger		
