= Ishkur's Guide to Electronic Music =

Online guide of electronic music subgenres

Ishkur's Guide to Electronic Music is an interactive online guide to electronic music created by Kenneth John Taylor, aka Ishkur. The website consists of 153 subgenres and 818 sound files. Genres include little-known ones like terrorcore and chemical breakbeat, and more popular genres like house or techno, diagrammed in the style of a phylogenetic tree.

== History ==
The guide was originally posted in 1999 as a Flash website and continually updated until 2001.

On December 11, 2016, Ishkur announced on Twitter that a new version of the guide would be released in 2017. Due to delays, Version 3.0 of the guide was instead released on August 20, 2019. Unlike the first two versions of the guide, the updated version no longer uses Adobe Flash.

== Reception ==
CMJ New Music Monthly praised the website for its "...ease of navigation, pithy genre descriptions, and fairly accurate audio accompaniment..." Oliver Hurley of The Guardian referred to the site as an "epic online endeavour", but pointed that several of the genres were made up by Ishkur, such as "Buttrock Goa".

== See also ==
- Electronic music
- Electronic dance music
- List of electronic music genres
- Genealogy of musical genres
- Music genre
- Music history
