= Genealogy of musical genres =

Study of how genres have developed

The genealogy of musical genres is the pattern of musical genres that have contributed to the development of new genres. Evolution in musical instruments in technology and in culture can influence the evolution of musical genres.

Genealogical charts or family trees of musical genres show how new genres have emerged from existing genres and how multiple genres have contributed to a new genre. Since music can be endlessly broken down into smaller and smaller categories, a genealogical chart will usually focus on one major genre and its different strains. How these developed out of one another is shown in a genealogical chart, often with major figures or innovators of each subgenre.

A simplified example appears below.

Classical
Opera
Rhythm and Blues
Reggae

Blues	Folk
Jazz	Country
Hip Hop	Rock
Soul	Metal	Punk
Funk
Disco
Dance/Electronic

== See also ==
- Ishkur's Guide to Electronic Music
- List of music genres and styles
- List of musical topics
