= Sound Voltex =

2012 rhythm game series

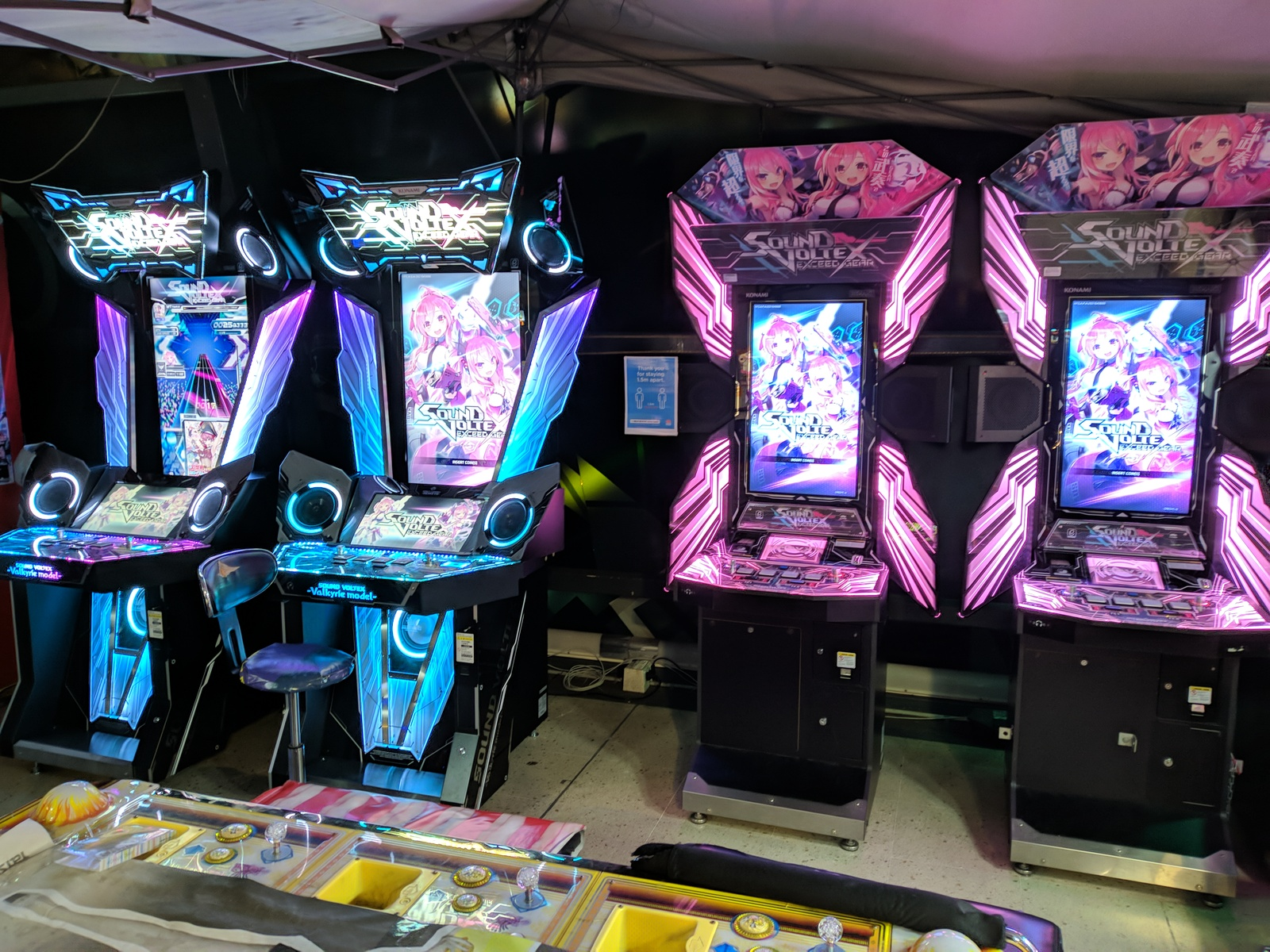
- Two Valkyrie model cabinets (left) and two standard cabinets (right) running Sound Voltex Exceed Gear
- Genre: Music
- Developer: Konami
- Publisher: Konami
- First release: Sound Voltex Booth; January 18, 2012 (JP)
- Latest release: Sound Voltex Nabla; December 24, 2025 (JP)

Sound Voltex (Japanese: サウンド ボルテックス; stylized in all caps) is a series of music games developed and published by Konami. The first release of the game, Sound Voltex Booth, was tested in various cities in Japan from August 26, 2011 until September 19, 2011. It was then released on January 18, 2012. Since then, six sequels have been released. Exceed Gear, from 2021, was the first to be released in North American territories.

The gameplay follows the formula of several other arcade and mobile rhythm games such as Beatmania IIDX and Arcaea, requiring the player to press buttons corresponding to "notes" approaching the bottom of the screen from the end of a simulated corridor. The game is likened to Beatmania in that the control scheme is intended to simulate performing as a DJ; rather than using a disc, Sound Voltex includes two control knobs to interact with "laser" notes.

== Overview ==
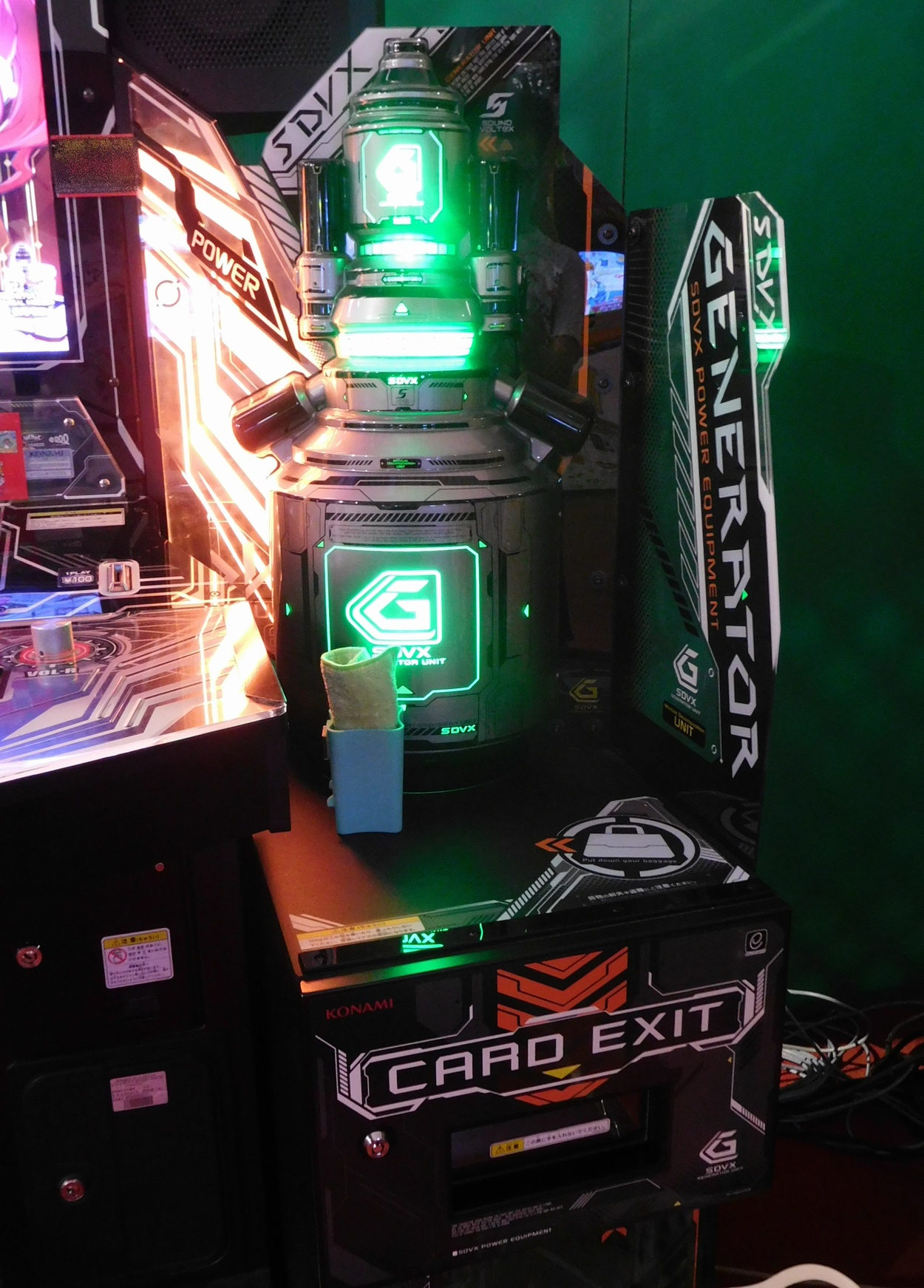
A Generator Real Model in a cabinet

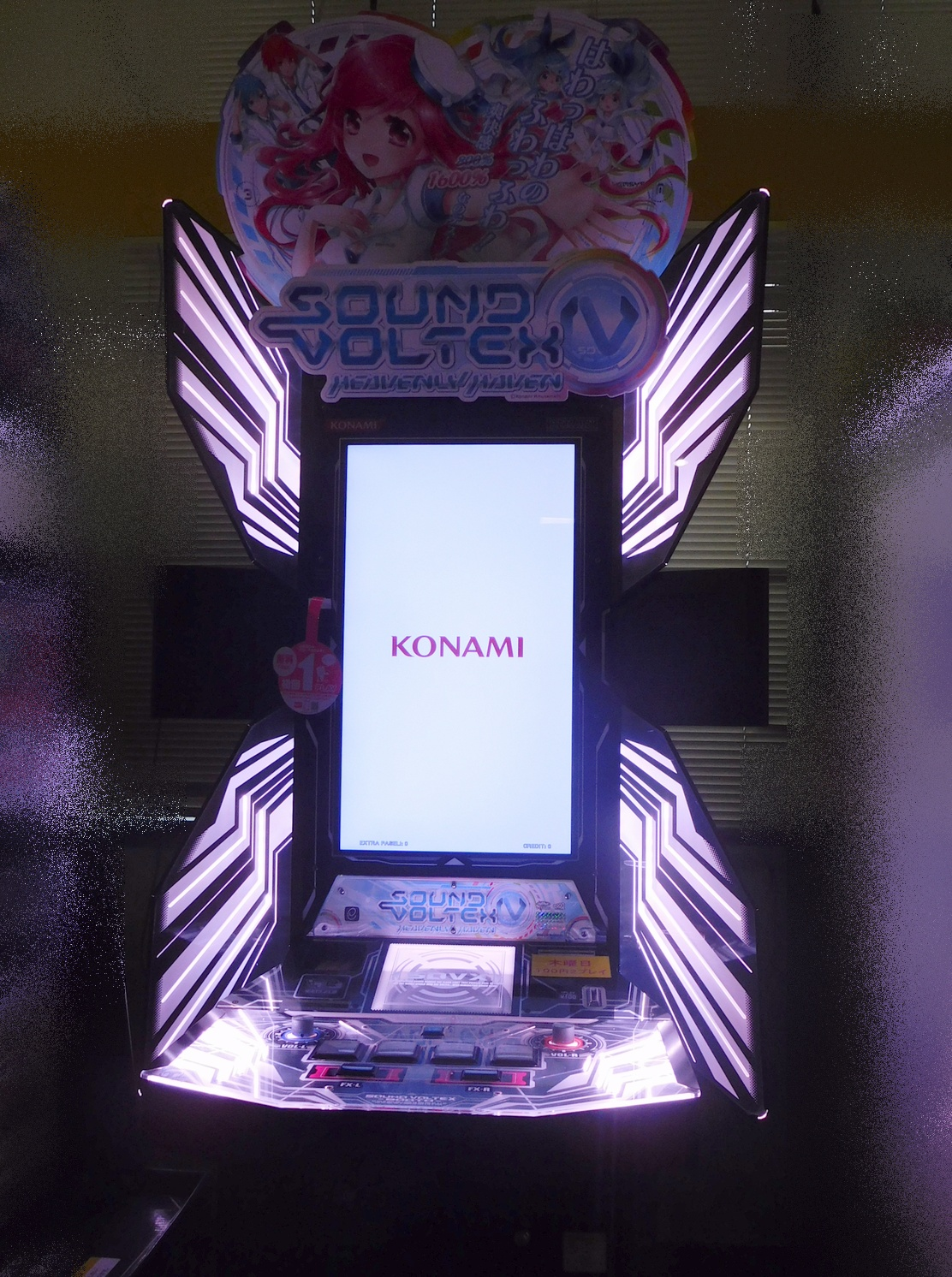
A SOUND VOLTEX IV cabinet

Sound Voltex has two different parts that relate to each other: Sound Voltex Booth and Sound Voltex Floor. Sound Voltex Booth is the main game, while Sound Voltex Floor is a system wherein game content is created by Japanese artists and musicians.

== Gameplay ==
Demonstration of the gameplay style and interface of Sound Voltex, featuring chip notes, hold notes, and knob-controlled lasers

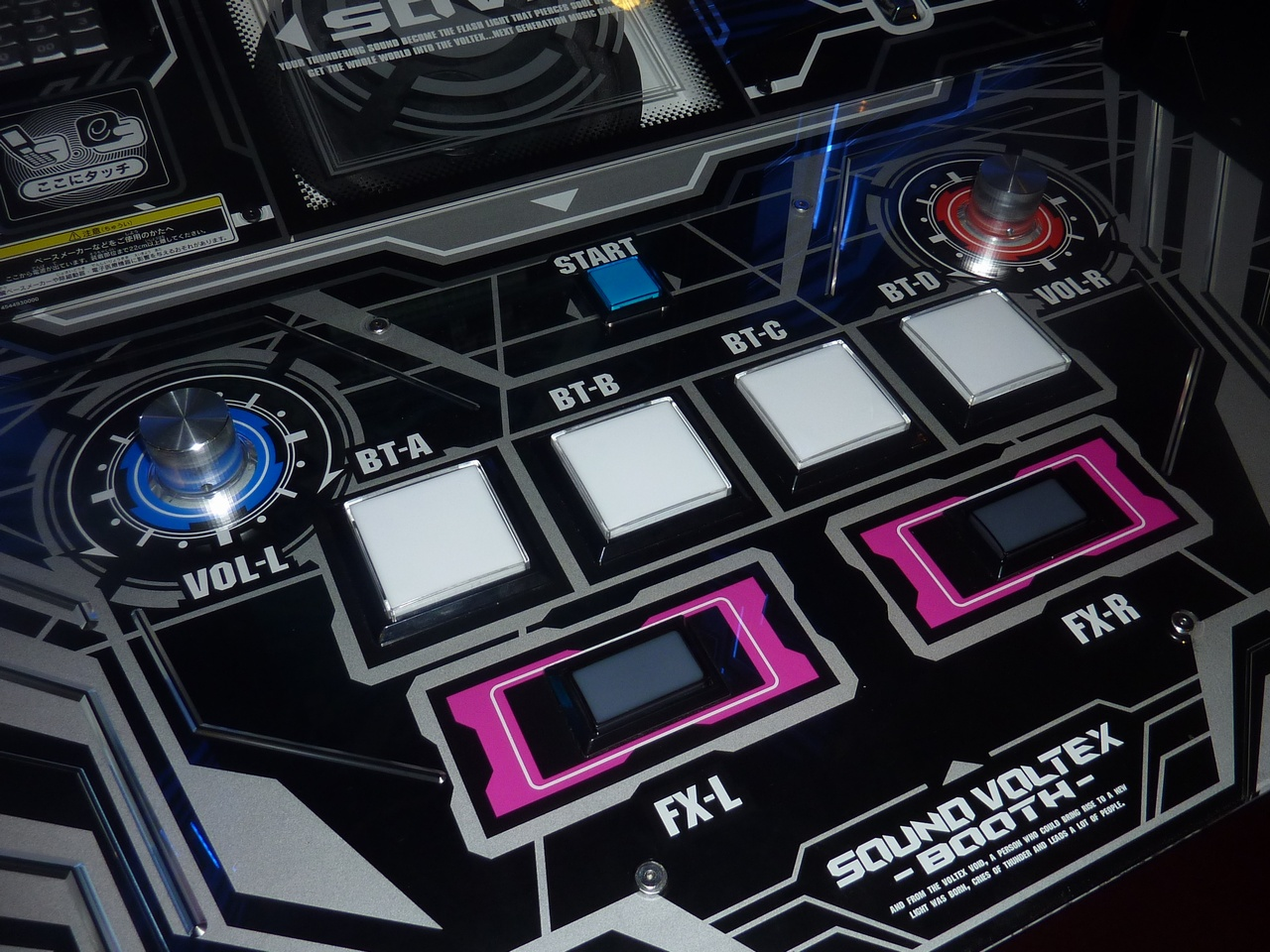
Control panel

Various objects, otherwise known as notes, come towards the player on the course lane, which consists of 6 columns with rails. The player is required to input corresponding commands when the object reaches the Critical Line at the bottom of the screen. The command required will differ, depending on the objects.

Four white buttons in the middle of the controller are used to hit the white notes. Two additional types of input are also required: two black buttons beneath the main four buttons, and two knobs on the top right and left corners.

The black buttons (known as FX buttons) are used to hit the orange notes (FX notes). These add effects to the song, similar to that of a DJ mixed song.

The knobs are used to control blue and pink lasers on the screen; the player turns the knobs in the direction of the corresponding laser. The left knob controls a blue laser, and the right knob controls a pink laser. The laser colors can be changed by the player (chosen between pink, blue, green, and yellow), but a warning will always appear on the corresponding side of the screen a short time before a laser starts, with a white "L" or "R" on a background color corresponding to that of the laser, to indicate which knob the player should turn.

A blue button on the top of the controller acts as the "Start" button, also being used as an "Okay" button of sorts. On the arcade cabinet, holding the start button while turning the right knob will change the lane speed. Lane speed is the speed at which the notes go down (this is as of Exceed Gear, older versions may require a different command).

== History ==
Sequels Sound Voltex II: Infinite Infection, Sound Voltex III: Gravity Wars, Sound Voltex IV: Heavenly Haven, Sound Voltex Vivid Wave, and Sound Voltex Exceed Gear were released on June 5, 2013, November 20, 2014, December 21, 2016, February 28, 2019, and February 17, 2021, respectively. On February 17, 2021, the publisher Konami released a new version of the cabinet called Sound Voltex: Valkyrie Model which included new features, such as a touchscreen mainly used to adjust settings; the new cabinet does not change the core gameplay. Sound Voltex has seen a limited release in arcades outside of Japan, with 2022 versions of Exceed Gear being the first in the series released in North America. In 2024, older non-Valkyrie models of the arcade cabinet were cut off from online updates and e-Amusement services. Sound Voltex ∇ (read as “Nabla”), the seventh edition of the game, was announced at the Japan Amusement Expo in November 2025. It has been released to arcades with an online Sound Voltex cab connected to the official E-amusement servers as of December 24, 2025.

Sound Voltex III: Gravity Wars saw the addition of Sound Voltex Generator Real Model in 2015, an add-on to some arcade cabinets that allowed for the printing of physical cards featuring art from the game.

== See also ==
- Bemani
