= Music Media-Mix Market =

Music-focused doujinshi convention

- Nickname: M3
- Status: Active
- Genre: Doujin music convention
- Frequency: Semiannual
- Venue: Tokyo Ryutsu Center in Ōta, Tokyo
- Inaugurated: March 21, 1998; 28 years ago
- Website: www.m3net.jp

Music Media-Mix Market, commonly abbreviated as M3, is a semiannual doujinshi convention held in Ōta, Tokyo that primarily caters to doujin music. Both independent and commercial vendors sell various audio and music-related goods, from CDs to musical instruments. It was first held on March 21, 1998, with 53 participating groups, which has since grown to over 1,000 participants per event. It is typically held at Tokyo Ryutsu Center in the spring and fall of each year.

== Program ==
M3 is focused on the sale of audio material such as doujin music and audio dramas. The event is run by a team of volunteers, and is held twice a year at Tokyo Ryutsu Center in Ōta, Tokyo – once in the spring (April or May), and once in the autumn (October).

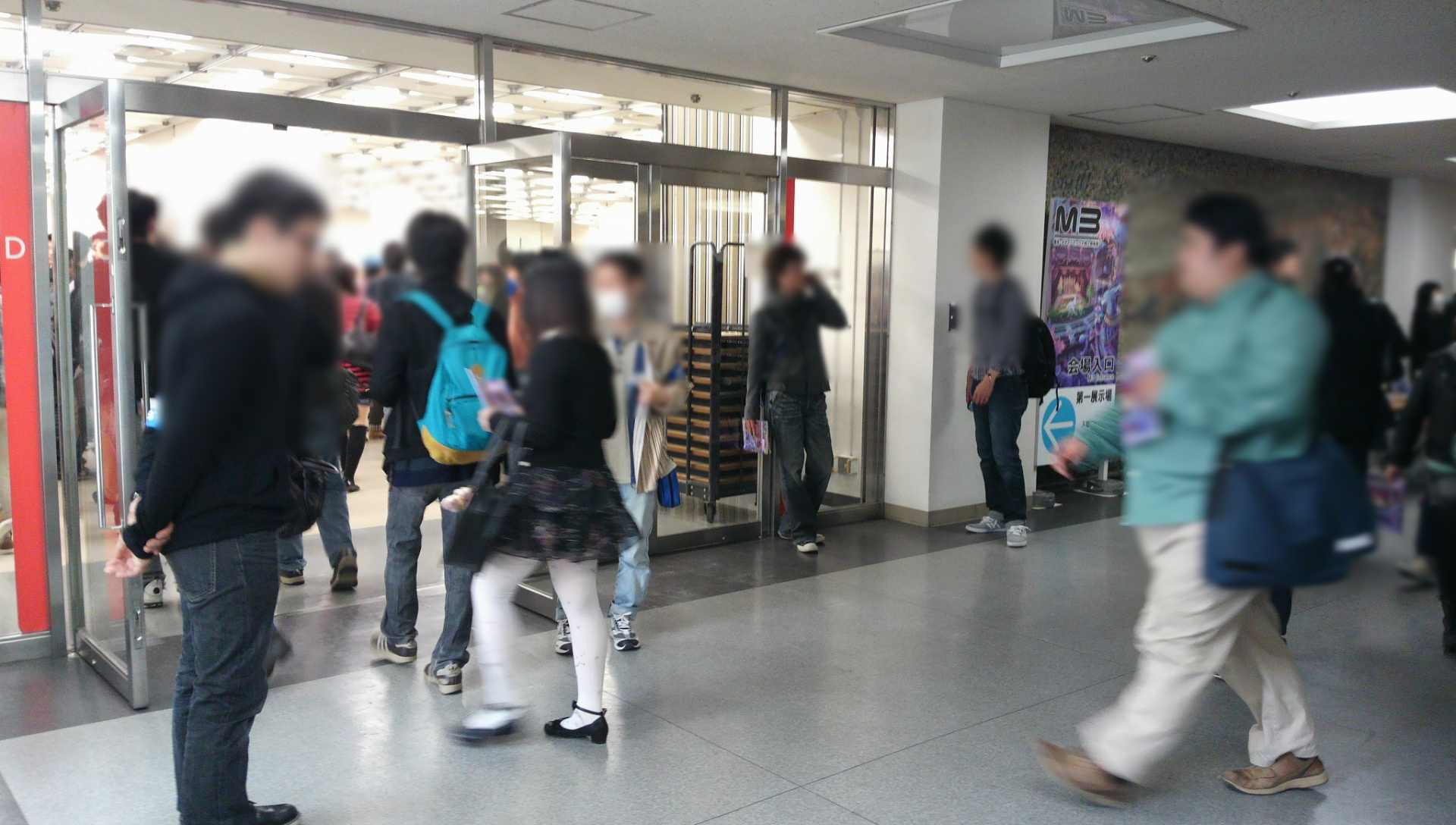
Attendees at M3-2013 Spring

Works sold at M3 span many different genres, and may either be derived from media properties such as video games or completely original works. Attendees of the event purchase a catalog which acts as their admission ticket as well as providing information on the participating vendors. The event also features a "listening corner" where attendees can listen to as many CDs as they would like from participating circles. Some participants perform live music at the event.

=== Participants ===
M3's primary participants are doujin circles, which consist of individuals or groups who create doujin work. These circles can be professional or amateur in nature. Over 1,300 circles participated in M3-2016 Autumn. Manufacturers of musical equipment also come to exhibit their wares, so that potential buyers can try out their products. Participants primarily come from Japan and other parts of Asia like South Korea and Taiwan, but circles from all around the world attend and sell at M3. Some participating circles would go on to find professional success, such as Sound Horizon. Some participants specialize in reviews of other circles' doujin albums.

== History ==
The first M3 event was held on March 21, 1998 at the Tokyo Stationery Kyowa Kaikan in Asakusabashi, with 53 participating circles. The idea for M3 came about due to Comiket not having a dedicated category for audio at the time, with music, radio dramas, and MAD tapes (derivative works made from splicing together audiovisual material) instead being exhibited in other categories such as doujin soft. Its first exhibitors also doubled as the event staff. Corporate vendors, such as instrument manufacturers, record labels, and software developers, would first attend the event for its tenth anniversary in 2008, and by 2011 they were an accepted part of the event's culture.

Early on, much of M3's works were arrangements of music from bishōjo games such as the works of Key, and other popular video games at the time, like Ragnarok Online and Higurashi When They Cry. Vocaloid played a significant role in M3's development, as the software easily allows for circles to produce vocal music without needing a human singer. Online platforms such as Niconico have also helped to draw attention to the event, with popular utaite (amateur online singers who cover songs) releasing their CDs. These new audiences drew in younger attendees in the middle to high school age range, who would come with their parents to purchase music. The popularity of Vocaloid and utaite also helped to attract a larger amount of female participants. In 2016, M3 was attended by over 10,000 people.

The event continued to be held during the COVID-19 pandemic in 2020 and 2021, though limited to 50% of the venue's usual capacity. As of 2024, the number of attendees has yet to return to pre-pandemic numbers.

=== Event history ===
No.	Year	Date	Venue
1	1998	21 March	Tokyo Stationery Kyowa Kaikan
2	1998	20 September	Tokyo Ryutsu Center
3	1999	18 April	Tokyo Stationery Kyowa Kaikan
4	1999	3 October	Tokyo Wholesale Center
5	2000	23 April	Tokyo Wholesale Center
6	2000	5 November	Tokyo Ryutsu Center
7	2001	30 April	Tokyo Stationery Kyowa Kaikan
8	2001	21 October	Tokyo Wholesale Center
9	2002	28 April	Tokyo Wholesale Center
10	2002	27 October	Tokyo Wholesale Center
11	2003	4 May	Ota City Industrial Plaza
12	2003	11 October	Ota City Industrial Plaza
13	2004	2 May	Ota City Industrial Plaza
14	2004	9 October	Ota City Industrial Plaza
15	2005	1 May	Ota City Industrial Plaza
16	2005	13 November	Ota City Industrial Plaza
17	2006	29 April	Ota City Industrial Plaza
18	2006	9 October	Ota City Industrial Plaza
19	2007	29 April	Ota City Industrial Plaza
20	2007	8 October	Ota City Industrial Plaza
M3 Osaka	2008	9 March	Grand Cube Osaka
21	2008	11 May	Ota City Industrial Plaza
22	2008	13 October	Ota City Industrial Plaza
M3 Festa	2008	24 November	Tokyo Metropolitan Industrial Trade Center
23	2009	2 May	Ota City Industrial Plaza
24	2009	11 October	Osanbashi Hall
25	2010	5 May	Tokyo Ryutsu Center
26	2010	31 October	Tokyo Ryutsu Center
27	2011	1 May	Tokyo Ryutsu Center
28	2011	30 October	Tokyo Ryutsu Center
29	2012	30 April	Tokyo Ryutsu Center
30	2012	28 October	Tokyo Ryutsu Center
31	2013	29 April	Tokyo Ryutsu Center
32	2013	27 October	Tokyo Ryutsu Center
33	2014	27 April	Tokyo Ryutsu Center
34	2014	26 October	Tokyo Ryutsu Center
35	2015	26 April	Tokyo Ryutsu Center
36	2015	25 October	Tokyo Ryutsu Center
37	2016	24 April	Tokyo Ryutsu Center
38	2016	30 October	Tokyo Ryutsu Center
39	2017	30 April	Tokyo Ryutsu Center
40	2017	29 October	Tokyo Ryutsu Center
41	2018	29 April	Tokyo Ryutsu Center
42	2018	28 October	Tokyo Ryutsu Center
43	2019	28 April	Tokyo Ryutsu Center
44	2019	27 October	Tokyo Ryutsu Center
45	2020	1 March	Tokyo Ryutsu Center
46	2020	25 October	Tokyo Ryutsu Center
47	2021	25 April	Tokyo Ryutsu Center
48	2021	31 October	Tokyo Ryutsu Center
49	2022	24 April	Tokyo Ryutsu Center
50	2022	30 October	Tokyo Ryutsu Center
51	2023	30 April	Tokyo Ryutsu Center
52	2023	29 October	Tokyo Ryutsu Center
53	2024	28 April	Tokyo Ryutsu Center
54	2024	27 October	Tokyo Ryutsu Center
55	2025	27 April	Tokyo Ryutsu Center
56	2025	26 October	Tokyo Ryutsu Center
57	2026	26 April	Tokyo Ryutsu Center
58	2026	25 October	Tokyo Ryutsu Center

== See also ==
- Comiket
