= Denpa (music) =

Japanese music style

- Stylistic origins: Happy hardcore; bubblegum Eurodance; Eurobeat; anisong
- Cultural origins: Early 1990s, Tokyo, Japan (especially Akihabara and Harajuku)
- Typical instruments: Synthesizer; drum machine; sequencer; keyboard; sampler

Subgenres
- Akiba-pop; Moe songs

Denpa (電波ソング) is a type of Japanese music that is intentionally strange and catchy. Common features of denpa songs include intentionally off-key vocals, nonsensical lyrics, and an over-the-top tune. Denpa music has grown into a subculture within Japan, forming a significant aspect of otaku culture, and has large numbers of dōjin circles and music artists dedicated to denpa music. Denpa is not a specific genre in itself, but rather an umbrella term for various kinds of music.

Alternative terms for denpa music coined in recent times include Akiba-pop (i.e. "pop of Akihabara") and A-pop. The term "Moe song" (萌えソング) specifically refers to denpa music of otaku origin featuring moe themes.

== Terminology ==
The Japanese term denpa (電波; "electromagnetic waves") originally arose in the 1990s to describe quirky individuals who often daydream and live in their personal fantasies, and was derived from the Fukagawa Street murders in 1981. The assailant, Kawamata Gunji (川俣軍司), was using illicit substances when he slashed random bystanders in broad daylight, killing two housewives and two toddlers and injuring many others. When confronted in court, he explained that electromagnetic waves were telling him to kill people, and pleaded insanity.

By the early 1990s, the term denpa began to appear throughout music and literature, and the phrase denpa-kei (電波系) was used to refer to delusional, creepy people or crazed lunatics as a derogatory euphemism, based on the idea that such people could hear voices, see things and communicate through telepathy as a result of electromagnetic waves. Examples of such usage at the time include songs by Japanese metal band Kinniku Shōjo Tai, which made references to the murder incident.

In regards to music, the term obtained a negative connotation, and was mainly associated with music that was considered creepy and had incomprehensible lyrics, often of otaku origin. Since otaku were often seen as strange people who behaved differently from the rest of society, denpa became widely associated with otaku culture in Japan and the Akihabara scene. Eventually, the term denpa began to encompass anyone who seemed quirky or out of tune with reality, as if these people were being hypnotized or controlled by electromagnetic waves. As time progressed, the denpa categorization of music began to take form, and such music became popular amongst otaku circles as a niche interest separate from the mainstream.

== Characteristics ==
Denpa songs consist of music with lyrics and tunes that are commonly viewed as awkward and strange. Despite this, listeners are drawn to it with the rationale that the music has "hypnotized" the listener; they are "under control" by the strangeness of the song. This feeling of being "poisoned and brainwashed" by the song is referred to by the term doku-denpa (毒電波; "poisonous electromagnetic waves").

Denpa songs often contain lyrics that are nonsensical or contain otaku-related themes. Common themes include delusions, telepathy or insanity, and often, such songs contain chaotic or repetitive lyrics to the point of creepiness. Denpa songs often feature repetitive chants or off-key singing alongside a catchy melody, accentuating the excessive energy of the music. High-pitched vocals, wotagei cheers, and other various extremes build towards the chaos which characterizes denpa. An example of such music is "Neko Mimi Mode", a song with the phrase "Neko Mimi Mode" repeated over and over as the lyrics. Denpa music may also be conflated with various other musical genres, such as gamewave, bitpop, and chiptune music.

Denpa is often characterized as cute and happy, since a large number of denpa music involves moe themes (which make denpa songs happy, cute, and fast-paced). However, this is not always the case, as they may also include darker themes. One conception of denpa music is that it is a type of "cute J-pop", but denpa is a largely underground trend. As such, it is not popular mainstream music, and has a separate scene to that of J-pop. Denpa was, in its early days, associated mainly with creepy music, and as a result, became frowned upon in the mainstream and remained confined to niche otaku groups. Under17 was a popular band which made songs that were musically cute with quirky lyrics, and these songs altered the perception of denpa music.

== Notable artists ==
- Camellia
- Emamouse
- IOSYS
- Kotoko
- Momoiro Clover Z
- Mosaic.wav
- Nanahira
- Nanawo Akari
- Under17

== See also ==
- Cringe pop
- Happy hardcore
- Kawaii future bass
- Hardcore techno
- Speedcore
