= Wacca (video game) =

2019 arcade rhythm game

WACCA
- Logo of WACCA
- Developer: Marvelous
- Publisher: Marvelous
- Producer: Tatsuya Yokoyama
- Artist: LAM
- Engine: Unreal Engine 4
- Platform: Arcade
- Release: July 18, 2019
- Genre: Rhythm game
- Modes: Single-player, Multiplayer
- Arcade system: Sega ALLS HX

Wacca (ワッカ; stylized in all caps) is a 2019 Japanese arcade rhythm game developed and published by Marvelous in collaboration with indie record label HARDCORE TANO*C.

== Gameplay ==
Demonstration of the gameplay of Wacca, featuring the game's unorthodox circular user interface

The game's arcade cabinet features a circular display screen enveloped by a circular touch panel on the outside; the player taps on the corresponding section of the touch panel as music notes approach the border of the circular screen, with the timing of the touch action resulting in a note judgement that contributes to the player's final score. In addition to some touch notes, the game also features hold notes, notes that slide left and right, and notes that involve flicking forwards and backwards on the touch pad.

Player progression data is saved using Sega's ALL.Net online service, with support for Sega Aime and Bandai Namco Banapassport IC cards.

== Development ==
Development for Wacca commenced in 2017, and the decision to collaborate with HARDCORE TANO*C – Japan's largest record label focused on hardcore techno music – was made during the early stages of development, as the game's producer, Tatsuya Yokoyama, was a fan of their work. Marvelous, having prior experience in developing games of various other genres, developed Wacca as their first arcade music rhythm game; they had previously developed the handheld rhythm game IA/VT Colorful for the PlayStation Vita in 2015.

During the game's opening event on October 19, 2018, Yokoyama stated that the primary reason for deciding on a rhythm game as their next title was due to his personal enjoyment of such games. HARDCORE TANO*C played an active role in gameplay development, creating note charts, with the game being their first attempt at writing game note charts in parallel with composing music audio tracks.

During the early stages of development, 20 different prototypes of the arcade cabinet were drafted, with various discarded proposals including DJ desk motifs as part of the control scheme. Once the final design was solidified, the game was developed under the tentative title CircuRing (サーキュリング). The final title of "WACCA" was selected due to the perceived sense of disharmony of how the name sounds, and that it would be able to differentiate the game from other rhythm game titles by intentionally omitting music-related tropes. The game features character illustrations by LAM.

While it is commonplace in other rhythm games to adjust gameplay difficulty according to the tempo of the music, Wacca utilises the 360-degree touch panel to make difficulty adjustments using elements unrelated to the tempo, such as hand positioning.

The game features collaboration songs from franchises such as Touhou Project and Senran Kagura as part of its music repertoire.

== Release ==
Wacca commenced service on July 18, 2019. The first major update to the game, titled Wacca S, was released on January 23, 2020, adding BPM notation, synchronising the start time of music during multiplayer play, and adding new game modes. Wacca Lily, released on September 7, 2020, added song rating and continue features, while Wacca Lily R, released on March 11, 2021, added various social interaction features. The final update, Wacca Reverse, released on August 10, 2021, added a bingo feature which offered rewards upon clearing missions, along with additional game modes.

Location testing for Wacca first took place between October 19, 2018, and November 4, 2018, at four stores across Japan, including Sega Akihabara Building No. 3. A second round of location testing was held from November 9, 2018 to November 18, 2018.

The online service for Wacca entered end-of-life on August 31, 2022, with all arcade cabinets subsequently placed in offline mode.

== Media ==
On July 18, 2022, Marvellous released a three-CD soundtrack titled Wacca Complete Album, featuring all original tracks written for the game. The main theme song for Wacca is "Let you DIVE!" by HARDCORE TANO*C All Stars with vocals performed by Saori Ōnishi, while the theme song for Wacca Lily is "with U" by t+pazolite and Massive New Krew with vocals by Shiki Aoki, and the theme song for Wacca Reverse is "Ouvertüre" by USAO and DJ Genki with vocals from Maki Kawase.
