= T+pazolite =

Japanese electronic musician (born 1985)

t+pazolite
- Born: Tomoyuki Hamada; 11 October 1985 (age 41); Niigata, Japan
- Genres: J-core, electronic music, doujin
- Occupations: Record producer, composer, disc jockey
- Years active: 2004–present
- Labels: Hardcore Tano*C, CHS, Druggy's Acid Rack, CHOMPO

Tomoyuki Hamada (Japanese: 浜田知幸; born 11 October 1985), known professionally as t+pazolite (トパゾライト, topazoraito), is a Japanese electronic musician that frequently contributes music to rhythm games.

== Biography ==
Hamada started writing music since third grade, having been a fan of rhythm game music from a young age. He had a period where he did not work on music for some time due to harsh criticism on samples he posted to bulletin board systems. After graduating from university, he worked as an IT engineer and only produced music as a side job. He quit his job as an engineer to focus on music production around 2014. He has stated that his music takes inspiration from Japanese folk music, Shibuya-kei, guitar pop and bossa nova.

== Musical career ==
Hamada began publishing music in 2004. He composed and self-published music through his own label, CHS (an acronym for Cutie and Headshaking Sounds). He later started publishing under the label Hardcore Tano*C and participated in several of their compilation albums, having applied to the circle early on in his career.

In 2016, he contributed four songs to the mobile game Groove Coaster 2 Original Style. At the end of the year, he contributed to the compilation album Gothic wa Mahouotome Super Compilation CD -LOVE MIX, an album themed around the mobile game Gothic wa Mahou Otome, part of which was included in the subsequent release of the game Groove Coaster 2 Heavenly Festival. His work has appeared in several games published by Konami since then. He is credited in episode 14 of Japan Anima(tor)'s Exhibition (日本アニメ（ーター）見本市). In 2017, he contributed to the soundtrack of the game War of Brains Re:Boot, as well as the live show of that year's Japan Amusement Expo. He contributed an original remix to the release of the mobile game D4DJ Groovy Mix in 2021, which was included in a 2023 compilation album.

Hamada released the album Without Permission in early 2020, following social media posts indicating that an upcoming release would contain music that could be used freely in any rhythm game "without permission" and free of charge. As of 2024, he produces music using Cubase.

== Discography ==
=== Studio albums ===
- Unlimited Spark! (CHS, 2006)
- GottaMaze ～ゴタマゼ～ (CHS, 2007)
- UltraCute!? (CHS, 2008)
- Unconnected (CHS, 2009)
- GottaMaze2 (CHS, 2009)
- RESetup (CHS, 2010)
- Honey I Scream! (CHS, 2010)
- Samplejunk (CHS, 2011)
- Songs for X Girlz (Hardcore Tano*C, 2011)
- Answer from X Girlz (CHS, 2012)
- So Many Materials (CHS, 2012)
- Ultra Cutie Breakin'!!!! (CHS, 2012)
- 絢爛喧騒オリエント (CHS, 2013)
- 異聞伝承アラカルト (CHS, 2014)
- Ponko2 Girlish (CHS, 2015)
- Good Evening, HOLLOWood (CHS, 2018)
- Without Permission (CHS, 2020)
- ハートエイク・デバッグ -Heartache Debug- (CHS, 2021)
- #TPZREMAKE 01 (CHS, 2021)
- Screamin' Showcase (CHS, 2021, with Nanahira)
- Fake Circus (CHS, 2023)
- #TPZREMAKE 02 (CHS, 2025)
- OMOIDE Patchwork (CHS, 2026)

=== EPs ===
- tpz Gomen Nasai EP (2011)
- Hommaging Greats (2011)
- Cutie Breaks E.P. (2011)
- I Wanna Wanna Wanna Remix!!! (2018)
- Crossing Delta (2019)
- Nghtshft (2020)
- Nghtshft 2 (2025)

=== Singles ===
- "HYPER4ID" (CHS, 2018)
- "DREADED NOTE" (Hardcore Tano*C, 2021)
- "T+ VS SHARK" (CHS, 2021)
- "Vacationista" (Hardcore Tano*C, 2022)
- "Haunted Device" (Hardcore Tano*C, 2022)
- "Toxic" (Hardcore Tano*C, 2023)
- "56 Seconds Later" (Hardcore Tano*C, 2023)
- "First Rendezvous" (CHOMPO, 2024)
- "Perfect Profanation" (Hardcore Tano*C, 2025)
- "Paranoid Arc" (CHS, 2025)
- "Golden Age" (Hardcore Tano*C, 2026)

=== Collaborations ===
- t+pazolite / 篠螺悠那 - Neetmania (CHS, 2007)
- t+pazolite / RoughSketch - 108 Sketches (CHSHC, 2008)
- t+pazolite / RoughSketch - 108 Sketches 2 (CHSHC, 2011)
- t+pazolite / RoughSketch - 108 Sketches 3 (CHSHC, 2013)
- t+pazolite / RoughSketch - 108 Sketches 4 (CHSHC, 2015)
- Aran, Massive New Krew & t+pazolite - Tri▼Force (CHS, 2016)
- Roughsketch & t+pazolite - Blossom CENSORED!! E.P. (2016)
- t+pazolite / RoughSketch - 108 Sketches 5 (CHSHC, 2017)
- t+pazolite / Laur - Pandemonium (CHS, 2023)
- MDK & t+pazolite - Password (CHOMPO, 2026)
