= Lanota =

2016 video game

- Nintendo Switch icon artwork
- Developer: Noxy Games
- Publisher: Noxy Games
- Engine: Unity
- Platforms: iOS, Android, Nintendo Switch
- Release: iOS, Android: WW: July 13, 2016; Switch: JP: June 14, 2018; NA: June 14, 2018; PAL: June 20, 2018
- Genre: Rhythm
- Mode: Single-player

Lanota is a rhythm game developed and published by Noxy Games. The iOS version and the Android version were released globally on the App Store and the Google Play Store respectively on July 13, 2016. The game on iOS requires initial purchase, but the Android version allows free play up to Chapter 3, interspersed with ads. On April 13, 2018, it was announced that a Switch port of Lanota by Flyhigh Works was undergoing development. The port was released worldwide in June 2018.

Lanota includes a story told in a picture book style, map exploration, and item collecting along with the main rhythm game gameplay. Players must complete songs in order to advance the story and unlock more songs.

== Gameplay ==
Lanota's playing field is a circle with a gear in the middle, where notes originate. On the App Store, it is described as a "plate". In game, it is referred to as the "Notalium Tuner". The player must tap (click), hold (catch), slide (rail), or flick the notes when they reach the outer ring of the circle in accordance to the beat. The plate changes sizes, spins, or moves around the screen in the middle of gameplay and the player must re-adjust themselves accordingly. Items will be picked up and stored as the player experiences the story. The story and items can be looked at by accessing the menu, which also includes options to customize the game interface. The player has the option to turn off background effects, change timing offset, tuner transparency, and tap note volume.

=== Scoring ===
The notes are categorized and scored differently depending on timing: Harmony, Tune, and Fail. For platinum (not basic paid) subscription only, fast/slow indicator can be toggled (for Tune or for (inaccurate) Harmony). Tunes will always give fast/slow (if fast/slow is turned on), and certain "inaccurate" Harmonies will give fast/slow (if fast/slow Harmony is turned on). Harmony gives full points, Tune gives half points, and Fail gives no points. The score is also combo-based, to the max combo attained also affects the final score. All songs have a maximum score of 1,000,000. Depending on the final score, the player is given a rank.

| Rank | Score |
|---|---|
| L | 1,000,000 - 980,000 |
| S | 979,999 - 950,000 |
| A | 949,999 - 900,000 |
| B | 899,999 - 700,000 |
| C | 699,999 - 500,000 |
| D | 499,999 - 0 |

Additionally, A song is considered "Perfect Purified" if all notes in the songs were Harmonies, and "All Combo" if no notes in the songs were Fails. Unofficially "理論値 (maximum theoretical score)" is considered if on top of getting "Perfect Purified", there is no fast/slow indicator triggered even if fast/slow indicator for Harmonies has been turned on in Options.

=== Modes ===
The player can choose to "Tune" or "Purify" songs. In Purify mode, the player fails the song if too many notes are missed. Tune mode does not have this restriction. The game has four difficulty settings, from easiest to most difficult: "Whisper", "Acoustic", "Ultra", and "Master". The master difficulty of every song must be unlocked by receiving an "A" rank or above on Ultra difficulty.

== Plot ==
According to the official site, the game takes place in a world similar to the real world until a calamitous disaster called "Al Niente" occurred long ago, rendering the majority of the earth devoid of sound and color. Areas are able to retain their color only by being near ordered "Notalium", an artificially created crystalline energy source left behind by ancient predecessors. The process of creating Notalium is currently forgotten; all Notalium is provided by the Notalium Administration. The player is given the task of controlling the two main characters, Fisica and Ritmo, to "tune" the Notalium that has weakened and become "disordered" over time to return the world to its original state.

=== Characters ===
Several characters appear in the game's story sections.

1. Ritmo: An energetic, self-proclaimed "Starlight Shooter" that spends his time writing music and playing his lute, despite lacking musical talent. He is the only one who can use the Notalium Tuner.
2. Fisica: A reserved, thoughtful genius who developed the Notalium Tuner. She enjoys reading books and cooking ratatouille.
3. Nero: A member of the Silence Border Guard.
4. Rossa: A member of the Silence Border Guard.

== Songs ==
As of March 2022, there are currently eight main chapters included. There are two side stories and eleven expansion packs, all containing five or six songs each, that can be purchased as DLC.

Songs

| Chapter | Song name | Composer | WHISPER difficulty | ACOUSTIC difficulty | ULTRA difficulty | MASTER difficulty |
|---|---|---|---|---|---|---|
| MAIN STORY; Chapter. 0 | Dream Goes On | Tiny Minim | 1 | 5 | 8 | 10 |
| MAIN STORY; Chapter. 0 | Only the Place Where Truth Has Engraved | KarasuyaSabou | 2 | 6 | 9 | 11 |
| MAIN STORY; Chapter. 0 | Chronosis Song | yanagi ft. Mika Kobayashi | 4 | 7 | 9 | 12 |
| MAIN STORY; Chapter. I | Vivid Color | naoto | 1 | 5 | 8 | 10 |
| MAIN STORY; Chapter. I | Ne m'oubliez pas | Triodust | 3 | 7 | 10 | 12 |
| MAIN STORY; Chapter. I | ciel nocturne | emon(Tes.) | 1 | 5 | 9 | 11 |
| MAIN STORY; Chapter. I | Night Yacht | Yukino | 2 | 6 | 9 | 13 |
| MAIN STORY; Chapter. I | DARSANA | Massive New Krew | 4 | 7 | 13 | 14 |
| MAIN STORY; Chapter. I | Prism | bermei.inazawa ft. Chata | 3 | 7 | 11 | 12 |
| MAIN STORY; Chapter. I | Trauma | Hige DriVAN | 5 | 8 | 11 | 14 |
| MAIN STORY; Chapter. I | Frey's Philosophy | Powerless | 6 | 8 | 12 | 15 |
| MAIN STORY; Chapter. II | Bokura no michi | makou ft. Tomomi Kobayashi | 1 | 5 | 9 | 13 |
| MAIN STORY; Chapter. II | Eternal Love | Tatsh feat. Odayuuu | 2 | 6 | 9 | 11 |
| MAIN STORY; Chapter. II | Matane | Moose | 3 | 7 | 10 | 12 |
| MAIN STORY; Chapter. II | Reclaim | DJ OKAWARI | 4 | 8 | 12 | 12 |
| MAIN STORY; Chapter. II | Journey | ARForest | 5 | 9 | 12 | 14 |
| MAIN STORY; Chapter. II | cyanine | jioyi | 6 | 10 | 13 | 15 |
| MAIN STORY; Chapter. III | Apocalypse | Alice Schach and the Magic Orchestra | 4 | 8 | 10 | 12 |
| MAIN STORY; Chapter. III | Song of Sprites | Sta | 4 | 7 | 10 | 13 |
| MAIN STORY; Chapter. III | Phoebus | Yooh | 3 | 7 | 11 | 13 |
| MAIN STORY; Chapter. III | Duelo | sweez / Meine Meinung | 5 | 8 | 11 | 14 |
| MAIN STORY; Chapter. III | Androgynos | WAiKURO | 5 | 8 | 12 | 14 |
| MAIN STORY; Chapter. III | Androgynos | WAiKURO | 5 | 9 | 13 | 14 |
| MAIN STORY; Chapter. III | You are the Miserable | t+pazolite | 6 | 9 | 13 | 15 |
| MAIN STORY; Chapter. IV | Raise (Radio Edit) | Junko Iwao | 4 | 7 | 10 | 13 |
| MAIN STORY; Chapter. IV | Geranium | SIHanatsuka | 5 | 8 | 11 | 13 |
| MAIN STORY; Chapter. IV | edge of the world | Shade | 5 | 9 | 12 | 14 |
| MAIN STORY; Chapter. IV | NIENTE | NILADMIRARI (ft. Machigerita) | 3 | 7 | 11 | 13 |
| MAIN STORY; Chapter. IV | Protoflicker | Silentroom | 4 | 8 | 13 | 15 |
| MAIN STORY; Chapter. IV | Stasis | Maozon | 6 | 13 | 15 | 16 |
| SIDE STORY; Chapter. 1 | Just a Fairy Tale | DJ'TEKINA//SOMETHING | 2 | 7 | 10 | 12 |
| SIDE STORY; Chapter. 1 | The Lonely Wolf | 3R2 | 3 | 5 | 8 | 12 |
| SIDE STORY; Chapter. 1 | Vortex | SIHanatsuka | 4 | 6 | 11 | 13 |
| SIDE STORY; Chapter. 1 | Ryusa No Toba -Casino de Quicksand- | Machigerita | 4 | 7 | 11 | 14 |
| SIDE STORY; Chapter. 1 | Promised Heaven | void (Mournfinale) ft. kalon. | 3 | 6 | 8 | 12 |
| SIDE STORY; Chapter. 2 | The Journey to Eden | Kitkit Lu | 1 | 5 | 10 | 12 |
| SIDE STORY; Chapter. 2 | Colorful Note | Hiroyuki Oshima ft. Haruka Shimotsuki | 4 | 6 | 10 | 13 |
| SIDE STORY; Chapter. 2 | Umioto | Junk feat. Yukacco | 2 | 6 | 9 | 11 |
| SIDE STORY; Chapter. 2 | LSDJACK | P.C.B. | 3 | 9 | 13 | 15 |
| SIDE STORY; Chapter. 2 | Little Painter | Siruka & ARForest | 5 | 8 | 11 | 13 |
| SIDE STORY; Chapter. 2 | Nagi | Yukino with Ayato Shinozaki | 3 | 7 | 11 | 14 |
| EXPANSION; Chapter. A | Broken Marionette | QWertism | 4 | 7 | 10 | 12 |
| EXPANSION; Chapter. A | 3rd Avenue | Sound Souler | 3 | 7 | 11 | 14 |
| EXPANSION; Chapter. A | Hall of Mirrors | Sta | 5 | 9 | 12 | 14 |
| EXPANSION; Chapter. A | Tokyo Snorkel (feat. nicamoq) | Yunomi | 2 | 6 | 10 | 13 |
| EXPANSION; Chapter. A | Time To Rock | Ayato Shinozaki feat. Mako Niina | 4 | 9 | 12 | 15 |
| EXPANSION; Chapter. A | Janus ~Ending to Begin~ | sweez / Meine Meinung | 3 | 9 | 11 | 13 |
| EXPANSION; Chapter. B | Unshakable | RiraN | 5 | 9 | 12 | 14 |
| EXPANSION; Chapter. B | Savage Hardcore | M-Project feat. Jonjo | 5 | 8 | 12 | 14 |
| EXPANSION; Chapter. B | Reignite | Lunatic Sounds | 5 | 9 | 12 | 14 |
| EXPANSION; Chapter. B | Funky Life | Sound Souler | 4 | 7 | 11 | 13 |
| EXPANSION; Chapter. B | ZENITHALIZE (Alternative Guitar Solo ver.) | void feat. Gt. Eba | 6 | 9 | 12 | 15 |
| EXPANSION; Chapter. C | Shining Girl, Shyness Love | Yamajet feat. TEA | 3 | 6 | 9 | 11 |
| EXPANSION; Chapter. C | Returner | Ayatsugu_Otowa | 3 | 8 | 10 | 13 |
| EXPANSION; Chapter. C | May and December | DJ'TEKINA//SOMETHING (feat. LUSCHKA) | 3 | 7 | 9 | 12 |
| EXPANSION; Chapter. C | MilK | Morimori Atsushi | 4 | 6 | 11 | 12 |
| EXPANSION; Chapter. C | Lonely departure | Chroma | 5 | 9 | 12 | 15 |
| EXPANSION; Chapter. D | Sakura Saku | Yunomi feat. nicamoq | 3 | 7 | 11 | 14 |
| EXPANSION; Chapter. D | Glamorous Girl | Heart's Cry feat. Poppo | 3 | 8 | 11 | 14 |
| EXPANSION; Chapter. D | MINAZUKI | DYK | 4 | 7 | 10 | 13 |
| EXPANSION; Chapter. D | Hayabusa | Yamajet | 5 | 8 | 12 | 15 |
| EXPANSION; Chapter. D | Specta | Junk | 5 | 8 | 12 | 14 |
| EXPANSION; Chapter. E | Ever Free | Massive New Krew | 5 | 8 | 10 | 13 |
| EXPANSION; Chapter. E | Nayuta | Massive New Krew | 4 | 7 | 11 | 14 |
| EXPANSION; Chapter. E | Sol e Mar | Massive New Krew | 4 | 8 | 11 | 14 |
| EXPANSION; Chapter. E | Oblivion of pecado | Massive New Krew & USAO | 3 | 6 | 9 | 12 |
| EXPANSION; Chapter. E | Memento Mori | Massive New Krew | 5 | 8 | 12 | 15 |
| EXPANSION; Chapter. F | Get Ready | GRILLED MEAT YOUNGMANS | 3 | 6 | 9 | 11 |
| EXPANSION; Chapter. F | Pusha Plucka!! | GNMD | 3 | 8 | 10 | 13 |
| EXPANSION; Chapter. F | Anesthesia | SIHanatsuka | 3 | 7 | 9 | 12 |
| EXPANSION; Chapter. F | Aihana (2017 Revived) | Junk | 4 | 6 | 11 | 12 |
| EXPANSION; Chapter. F | Beast in the Dream | Ayatsugu_Otowa | 5 | 9 | 12 | 15 |
| EXPANSION; Chapter. G | Remaining days | Hige DriVAN | 4 | 8 | 10 | 14 |
| EXPANSION; Chapter. G | Kiss me | Hige DriVAN | 5 | 9 | 11 | 13 |
| EXPANSION; Chapter. G | How is Life? | Hige DriVAN | 3 | 7 | 11 | 14 |
| EXPANSION; Chapter. G | Internet neurose | Hige DriVAN | 3 | 8 | 10 | 14 |
| EXPANSION; Chapter. G | We like girls | Hige DriVAN | 6 | 10 | 13 | 15 |
| EXPANSION; Chapter. H | Romance Wars | U-ske (feat. lueur) | 6 | 9 | 12 | 14 |
| EXPANSION; Chapter. H | Ignotus | ak+q | 5 | 8 | 12 | 14 |
| EXPANSION; Chapter. H | Quon | Feryquitous | 6 | 10 | 13 | 15 |
| EXPANSION; Chapter. H | Lethaeus | Silentroom | 5 | 10 | 12 | 14 |
| EXPANSION; Chapter. H | Lumia | sky_delta | 4 | 7 | 11 | 13 |
| EXPANSION; Chapter. I | Tobitate! DREAM PARTY | YUME (CV. Nanami Takahashi) | 4 | 8 | 11 | 13 |
| EXPANSION; Chapter. I | Scarlet Lance | MASAKI (ZUNTATA) | 5 | 9 | 12 | 15 |
| EXPANSION; Chapter. I | FUJIN Rumble | COSIO (ZUNTATA) | 6 | 10 | 13 | 15 |
| EXPANSION; Chapter. I | Black MInD | COSIO (ZUNTATA) | 5 | 8 | 12 | 15 |
| EXPANSION; Chapter. I | Got more raves? | E.G.G. | 6 | 9 | 13 | 15 |
| EXPANSION; Chapter. J | Sign Mellow | SID-Sound | 4 | 7 | 10 | 12 |
| EXPANSION; Chapter. J | Misty Farewell | t+pazolite | 4 | 8 | 11 | 14 |
| EXPANSION; Chapter. J | Mints - Clubmix - 2017 | Yamajet | 4 | 7 | 11 | 13 |
| EXPANSION; Chapter. J | The Promised Land | RiraN ft. core mc | 6 | 9 | 12 | 13 |
| EXPANSION; Chapter. J | PYONTA | DJ'TEKINA//SOMETHING | 5 | 9 | 13 | 15 |
| EXPANSION; Chapter. K | MariannE (Lanota Edit) | Yooh | 5 | 9 | 14 | 15 |
| EXPANSION; Chapter. K | Fortuna | Powerless | 5 | 9 | 13 | 15 |
| EXPANSION; Chapter. K | Science-kun | Keisuke Hattori | 4 | 8 | 12 | 14 |
| EXPANSION; Chapter. K | Clock Atelier | ARForest | 5 | 8 | 12 | 13 |
| EXPANSION; Chapter. K | Aishiteirunante kantanni iuyouna lovesong ga kiraidatta | KarasuyaSabou | 5 | 9 | 12 | 13 |

== Reception and awards ==
Lanota has been awarded 1st place for "Excellence in Audio" in the IMGA SEA 2016 and "Best Audio" for the 2017 Taipei Game Show Indie Game Awards. The game was also nominated in the 2017 13th IMGA and for the 2017 Indie Prize Award for "best Mobile Game" in Casual Connect Asia

TouchArcade rates it a 4.5/5, saying that the gameplay "adds some refreshing dynamism to a genre that is notorious for static gameplay." but complains that the moving playfield "makes it too difficult to follow at the best of times." On October 27, 2016, Noxy Games has claimed the app had been downloaded at least 100,000 times.
