= Muse Dash =

- Developer: PeroPeroGames
- Publishers: hasuhasu; XD Network (Japan)
- Engine: Unity
- Platforms: iOS; Android; Microsoft Windows macOS; Nintendo Switch
- Release: iOS: June 14, 2018; Android: June 15, 2018; Microsoft Windows, macOS: June 20, 2019; Nintendo Switch: June 20, 2019
- Genre: Rhythm game
- Mode: Single player

Muse Dash is a rhythm game developed by PeroPeroGames based in China and published by hasuhasu and XD Network in Japan. It was initially released for iOS and Android in June 2018, later being released on Nintendo Switch, Windows and macOS in June 2019. It combines aspects of action games and music games, using an anime art style in the form of a 2D side-scrolling video game.

== Gameplay ==
Demonstration of the typical gameplay style and interface of Muse Dash. The player character strikes enemies as they approach, in time with the music.

In Muse Dash, players defeat enemies and avoid obstacles originating from the right side of the screen by pressing buttons or tapping the screen in accordance with the beat of the song playing in the background. The game has only two buttons, making it easily accessible. Difficulty settings exist for most songs, allowing the game to cater to multiple skill levels.

The playable characters in Muse Dash are called Muses. Each Muse has their own maximum health and passive skill, depending on the selected costume. Players can also equip Elfins, companions to a Muse which most give them additional abilities.

== Reception ==
Reception

Aggregate score
Aggregator	Score
Metacritic	(NS) 73/100

Review scores
Publication	Score
Pocket Gamer	4/5
Shacknews	8/10

The game received "mixed or average reviews" according to review aggregator website Metacritic, listing the game with a score of 73/100. Nintendo World Report rated Muse Dash with an 8.5/10, saying that it has a "fun and colorful presentation". CGMagazine reviewed and rated Muse Dash 8/10 in 2019, commenting, "Muse Dash offers enough quality content to keep rhythm game fans busy for a long time."

Mike Fahey of Kotaku praised the game saying that "Rhythm games don't get much simpler and sweeter than Muse Dash", that it controls with just two buttons, the music selection is wonderful, and the characters are charming.

=== Awards ===
At TapTap’s 2018 Game Awards, Muse Dash received nominations for “Best Audio”, “Best Visual Art”, and “Gamer’s Choice”, winning the “Gamer’s Choice” award. At BitSummit Vol. 6 (2018) Muse Dash was an Official Selection and nominated for "The Excellence in Sound Design Award".
