= Speedcore =

Form of hardcore electronic music genre

- Stylistic origins: Hardcore; breakcore; gabber
- Cultural origins: Early 1990s, Benelux, Germany

Subgenres
- Extratone; Flashcore; Splittercore

Fusion genres
- Cybergrind

Regional scenes
- Germany; Japan; Eastern Europe

Other topics
- Digital hardcore; grindcore

Speedcore is a form of electronic music that is characterized by a high tempo and aggressive themes. It was created in the early 1990s, the name originating from the hardcore genre as well as the high tempo used. Songs are usually classified as speedcore at around 300 BPM upwards to 600 BPM, but can vary subjectively with a lower bound of 240 BPM retroactively fitted onto earlier tracks.

== Characteristics ==
Aside from tempo, speedcore can often be distinguished from other forms of hardcore mainly by the accompanying space now being punctuated with percussion fills. Most producers will overdrive their kicks to an extent of overtly resembling square waves. Producers often resort to transgressive themes in their music to push the boundaries of the genre.

Since the 2000s, the use of digital audio workstations (DAWs) has grown, preferred to the use of analog synthesizers or trackers.

== History ==
=== Origins (1992–1993) ===
Speedcore is a natural progression of hardcore techno. Hardcore was already considered fast, however, there were those who were not content to stay at the established speed. Early speedcore was about pushing the limits of BPM and aggression level. One of the first songs to explore higher speeds was "Thousand" by Moby in 1992, which peaked at approximately 1,015 BPM. A sobriquet for hardcore overall, 'nosebleed techno', would lend its name to Australian act Nasenbluten and the Nosebleed event in Rosyth, Scotland.

=== Early speedcore (1994–1999) ===
Excerpt from "N.Y.C. Speedcore" (1996), a seminal speedcore track and of the first to use the term, by New York City outfit Disciples Of Annihilation.

The term speedcore in reference to hardcore of 240 BPM upwards can be traced as far back as 1995. Disciples of Annihilation coined the name of the genre with their track "N.Y.C. Speedcore". In 1998, Belgian artist Einrich 3600 BPM started using oscilloscopes to trigger kick drums at speeds of 3600 BPM (the 60 hertz mains frequency associated with NTSC standards) and upwards. This practice led to rudimentary synthesis of waves as notes, and thus the founding of the extratone subgenre.

It was not until the early 2000s that the genre was predominantly referred to as speedcore. Before then, many tracks that would be considered speedcore were referred to as "gabba" (this spelling being German in origin).

=== Spread (early 2000s) ===
The early 2000s saw the birth of many netlabels dedicated to speedcore. Many labels who produced vinyl were also publishing MP3 files on their websites, which became increasingly popular and made it easier for new producers to enter the scene.

=== Internet growth (2010s) ===
The 2010s saw a large growth in netlabels. DAWs made it cheaper and easier for new musicians to make experimental music. The internet allowed producers from around the world to communicate with each other, and share their works through netlabels. Compilations became preferred for artists to share their music for getting wider exposure, rather than if a release were to be self-published/distributed. A large portion of the speedcore scene now occurs online from netlabels to speedcore promotion channels on YouTube. Speedcore was no longer restrained to localized areas where raves occurred and records were released.

== Subgenres ==
=== Splittercore ===
Speedcore is often called splittercore when at a tempo through 600 to 1,000. Splittercore is subsequently identified with kick patterns resembling machine gun fire.

=== Flashcore ===
Flashcore is a genre that grew out of speedcore, industrial hardcore and IDM, having been pioneered by French artist La Peste on his label Hangars Liquides. Flashcore is marked with odd rhythmic influence and its namesake short kicks constructed with a prominent decay in pitch, leading to a higher electroacoustic music and experimental music influence compared to any mainstream dance music genre. Most of the genre's works focus on either implicit or explicit deviations away from four-on-the-floor rhythmic structure and subdivisions thereof.

=== Extratone ===
Speedcore with a tempo of 1,000 or higher is called extratone. In this range of tempo, the separation between kicks are negligible to the human ear and thus susceptible to rhythmic alterations which can modify the timbre of the resulting tonal illusion. Extratone often uses minims, quavers and semiquavers to change the pitch of the tone by a number of octaves. The name "extratone" originates from combining the two German words extrahieren (to extract) and Ton (sound).

== See also ==
- List of electronic music genres
