= Doujin music =

Self-published fan music

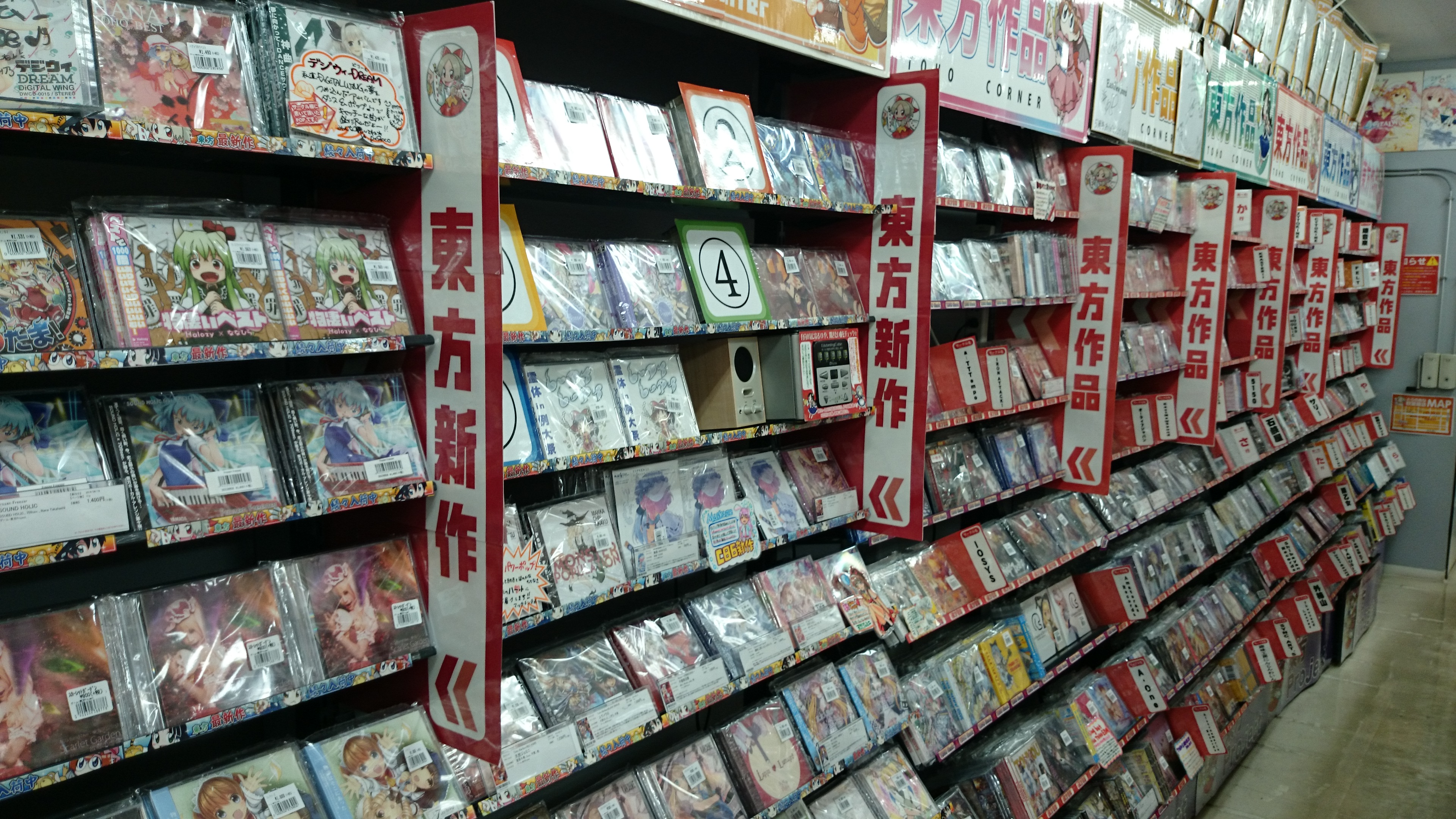
A store selling the CDs of Touhou Project doujin music

Doujin music (同人音楽, dōjin ongaku), also called otokei doujin (音系同人) in Japan, is a sub-category of doujin activity. Doujin are non-official self-published Japanese works which can be based on official products or completely original creations. Such products are sold online on specialized sites, on the authors' own sites, and at conventions such as Comiket and the audio-focused M3.

== Genres and production ==
Doujin music is not a musical genre in itself, but instead a term used for independently produced and self-published music. Doujin music may entail fan arrangements and remixes from anime and video games, or wholly original works in a variety of genres. Electronic music makes up around a third of all doujin music, though other genres such as rock and jazz can also be found. Vocaloid and utaite albums are often sold at doujin events. A large portion of doujin music is dedicated to the doujin game franchise Touhou Project.

Doujin music is produced by circles, which can range from being individuals to small groups. Circles often put out around two to four albums per year depending on their size, typically selling CDs through events like Comiket and Music Media-Mix Market, both of which are held on a semiannual basis. Events dedicated to specific franchises are also held, such as the Hakurei Shrine Retaisai for Touhou Project and The Vocaloid Master for Vocaloid music respectively. Doujin music is also commonly sold in shops within Akihabara. Albums are sometimes promoted with dedicated sites, with some using specialized templates for Tumblr.

== Notable artists and groups ==
- Akiko Shikata, a soprano singer, composer, arranger, producer and multi-instrumentalist whose songs often tend towards experimentalism
- Annabel, who has worked on several anime productions and is known for works in partnership with musicians like Nagi Yanagi and bermei.inazawa
- Camellia, an electronic musician
- Chata, a video game and anime vocalist
- Haruka Shimotsuki, a vocalist known for her fantasy themes
- IOSYS, a doujin group most commonly recognized for their Touhou arrangements
- Kishida Kyōdan & The Akeboshi Rockets, a rock band formed by Kishida and four other members
- Rekka Katakiri, a singer who manages her own Closed/Underground label
- Sound Horizon, who describe themselves as a "fantasy band"
- T+pazolite, a j-core producer and member of the label HARDCORE TANO*C
- Team Shanghai Alice, the creator of and the composer for the Touhou Project

== See also ==
- Doujin soft
- Doujinshi
- Denpa song
- Video game music
- Self publishing
- Independent music
