= Hololive: Let's Head Out! =

Upcoming Japanese anime television series

おでかけホロライブ (Odekake Hororaibu)
- Created by: Kadokawa Corporation; Cover Corporation
- Anime television series
- Directed by: Shunsuke Machiya
- Written by: Kōdai Minami
- Studio: Studio Kai
- icon

Hololive: Let's Head Out! (Japanese: おでかけホロライブ, Hepburn: Odekake Hororaibu), also known as Odekake Hololive, is an upcoming Japanese anime television series produced by Kadokawa Corporation and Cover Corporation and animated by Studio Kai. The series is part of a franchise from the VTuber agency Hololive Production, part of its 10th anniversary. It will be directed by Shunsuke Machiya, with Ōri Yasukawa serving as assistant director, Kōdai Minami handling the series composition, and Masatoshi Tsuji designing the characters.

The anime project was announced under the abbreviation Odeholo (おでホロ, Odehoro) at a Hololive Next livestream on September 7, 2026. More details on the project were announced on a September 23 livestream on the project's YouTube channel, headlined by Shirakami Fubuki and Ookami Mio.

== Synopsis ==
The series is billed as an anthology centered around Hololive members as they explore and travel to different parts of Japan.

== Cast ==
The series will feature appearances from 29 Hololive talents:

- Tokino Sora
- Roboco-san
- Aki Rosenthal
- Shirakami Fubuki
- Natsuiro Matsuri
- Nakiri Ayame
- Yuzuki Choco
- Oozora Subaru
- AZKi
- Ookami Mio
- Sakura Miko
- Nekomata Okayu
- Inugami Korone
- Hoshimachi Suisei
- Usada Pekora
- Shiranui Flare
- Shirogane Noel
- Houshou Marine
- Tsunomaki Watame
- Tokoyami Towa
- Himemori Luna
- Yukihana Lamy
- Momosuzu Nene
- Shishiro Botan
- Omaru Polka
- La+ Darknesss
- Takane Lui
- Hakui Koyori
- Kazama Iroha
