= Hakui Koyori =

Japanese VTuber

- 博衣こより
- Hakui Koyori as designed by Momoco
- Occupation: VTuber

YouTube information
- Channel: Koyori ch. 博衣こより - holoX -
- Years active: 2021–present
- Subscribers: 1.37 million
- Views: 758 million
- Last updated: September 16, 2026
- Website: hololivepro.com

Hakui Koyori (Japanese: 博衣こより) is a Japanese VTuber affiliated with Hololive Production. She made her debut on November 28, 2021. She is known for the high-frequency with which she livestreams. Hakui released her first album, First Step, in 2025, and her second album, Chemical Spark, is set for release in December 2026.

== Career ==
Hakui Koyori is a member of Hololive's sixth generation, Secret Society HoloX, alongside La+ Darknesss, Takane Lui, Sakamata Chloe, and Kazama Iroha. She made her debut on November 28, 2021. Her character was designed by the illustrator Momoco, featuring pink hair and coyote ears. In her lore, she is described as HoloX's researcher, with her fans being called her assistants, and her character's birthday is March 15.

She regularly hosts a morning program, AsaKoyo, that is about an hour long. She first livestreamed it on December 2, 2021, and it initially acted as a radio broadcast that had one half dedicated to her talking and another half featuring special segments, such as one where she would read lines provided by viewers; it initially aired twice a week. AsaKoyo has come to eschew focus on Hakui and it now focuses on providing news and updates on Hololive and its members. On September 29, 2026, AsaKoyo aired its 300th episode.

Her livestreams feature her playing a variety of video games of varying lengths, some of which are short games that can be completed in a few hours. Many of the games she plays are retro games or Soulslikes, and she does not have lots of experience with FPS games. She also plays role-playing games in blind playthroughs. In June 2022, Hakui gained a 3D model. Hakui reached one million subscribers on YouTube on September 24, 2023.

Hakui is known for the very-high frequency with which she livestreams and releases videos. It is rare for her to not have livestreamed on every day of a given month. For instance, an undercount found that she had done 35 livestreams in the first 20 days of August 2024 and 352 livestreams by that point in the year. On September 11, 2022, Hakui uploaded her 500th video to YouTube. The analytics website Stream Charts estimated that she streamed for 1,914 hours in 2023. As of November 6, 2026, Hakui had released 3,556 YouTube videos, a total that includes archived livestreams, standard videos, and YouTube Shorts. This was the second-highest total for Hololive-affiliated VTubers, after Tsunomaki Watame, who began livestreaming two years before Hakui and had 65 more videos as of November 6. Hakui did not take an extended break from livestreaming until May 2026, which lasted about a month and was interspersed with her regularly releasing non-livestream content. During Golden Week in 2023, Hakui debuted Konkoyo24, a 24-hour variety livestream inspired by similar Japanese TV marathons. The livestream also saw the debut of a talk show "Discord Shocking", which features a different guest introduced by the previous guest. A second Konkoyo24 was held in 2024, which alternated between live and pre-recorded segments.

=== Music ===
Hakui's first single, "Wao!!", which was written and composed by Deco*27 and arranged by Rockwell, was released on June 17, 2022. Her second single, "Girls seeks Q.E.D.", is themed around her researcher character, featuring pi in its lyrics, and its title features the science initialism Q.E.D. She held a live concert to coincide with her character's birthday on March 15, 2023, first performing her singles "Shijyo Saidai no Question!" and "Egoistic Seesaw" at the concert. At a concert to coincide with the 2nd anniversary of her debut on November 28, 2023, she first performed her singles "Unbalance" and "Tear-Gazer". She was also part of the music group Blue Journey. She has also released many cover songs, which include classics and trending songs. She has also held concerts with only acoustics. On March 15, 2024, to coincide with her character's birthday, she performed at a 3D concert that included appearances by Rica Matsumoto, and released her seventh single "New Journey".

She held an online concert on April 7, 2024, as part of a collaboration with Nissin Cup Noodles. Hakui's first album, First Step, was released on March 15, 2025, the same day she held a 3D concert, to coincide with her character's birthday. On March 28, 2026, she released the single "Kanseitouyori". Hakui's second album, Chemical Spark, is themed around her being a woman in science and it is set to release on December 2, 2026. Hakui's first in-person concert is set to take place at Tokyo Garden Theater on December 22, 2026.

=== Baseball ===
Hakui is a fan of baseball. In November 2025, Hakui hosted a tournament on the baseball simulator Powerful Pro Yakyū 2024 - 2025 that reached over 120,000 concurrent viewers on her channel. At the 2026 World Baseball Classic (WBC), Hakui called play ball at the Pool C match between Japan and the Czech Republic. Japan won the match 9-0. She also simulcast some WBC games. Some netizens blamed Hakui for Japan's defeat in the WBC quarterfinals, the match following her call, and others also criticized her involvement, as a VTuber, in the WBC. These reactions were referenced and parodied by the comedian Soshina in a skit, which itself contributed to the polarization regarding Hakui's involvement.

=== Artificial intelligence ===
She has also created content centered on an artificial intelligence known as "AI Koyori". AI Koyori was created in 2023, after Hakui expressed interest in amid an examination by Hololive of possible uses of AI. She supervised its creation, supplying 3,000 sentences of her speech for its training data, and the AI has her same appearance and voice. Its text-to-speech functions utilize ChatGPT.

=== Other work ===
Hakui's first official merchandise was released for sale in March 2022. She also appeared as a character in the manga HoloX Meeting. Hakui provided the children-oriented audio guide at the Hakone Venetian Glass Museum with Hololive-affiliated VTuber Juufuutei Raden from January to July 2025. She has collaborated with the company Kurand to release Hakui-themed sake in 2022 and 2026. In July 2025, a monthly column in Famitsu written by Hakui began syndication. In September 2025, Hakui announced that she was the subject of a research project by a Japan Tobacco research group focused on voice. Hakui voiced the characters Ikuhara Yume and Tinkermon in episode 19 of Digimon Beatbreak, which was released in February 2026. She has also voiced characters in Poker Chase and Yo-kai Watch. In September 2026, Entergram announced that they were developing Koyorenium, a visual novel starring Hakui which was also supervised by her. Entergram has previously produced visual novels starring Hololive members Minato Aqua and Nekomata Okayu.

== Personal life ==
Hakui is a licensed pharmacist. For a time, she simultaneously attended voice-acting and pharmacy schools. For five years since her debut in Hololive, Cover Corp. did not allow her to reveal that she is a pharmacist, which interfered with her streams since she had to conceal her medical knowledge even when the topic came up during her gaming streams. After consulting with the company, she revealed her pharmacist profession in November 2026.

== Discography ==
=== Studio albums ===
==== As lead artist ====
Title	Album details	Peak chart positions			Sales
Title	Album details	JPN	JPN Comb.	JPN Hot	Sales
First Step	Released: March 15, 2025; Label: Cover Corp.; Formats: CD, digital download, streaming	12	14	— (Note: First Step did not enter the Billboard Japan Hot Albums chart, but peaked at number 17 on the Download Albums chart.)	JPN: 12,053
Chemical Spark	To be released: December 2, 2026; Label: Cover Corp.; Formats: CD, digital download, streaming	To be released			
"—" denotes releases that did not chart.

==== As Secret Society HoloX ====
Title	Album details	Peak chart positions			Sales
Title	Album details	JPN	JPN Comb.	JPN Hot	Sales
Secret Order	Released: April 8, 2026; Label: Cover Corp.; Formats: CD, digital download, streaming	7	10	— (Note: Secret Order did not enter the Billboard Japan Hot Albums chart, but peaked at number 19 on the Download Albums chart.)	JPN: 10,665
"—" denotes releases that did not chart.

=== Singles ===
==== As lead artist ====
Title	Year	Peak chart positions		Album
Title	Year	JPN Dig.	JPN DL	Album
"Wao!!"	2022	22	20	First Step
"Girls seeks Q.E.D." (乙女よ求めよQ.E.D.)	2022	50	42	First Step
"Shijyo Saidai no Question!" (史上最大のQUESTION!)	2023	28	19	First Step
"Egoistic Seesaw" (エゴイスティック・シーソー)	2023	31	31	First Step
"Unbalance" (アンバランス)	2023	41	44	First Step
"Tear-Gazer"	2023	47	48	First Step
"New Journey"	2024	—	—	First Step
"Decorate" (デコレート)	2024	—	70	First Step
"Shiawase√Koyorinium" (シアワセ√コヨリニウム)	2024	—	—	First Step
"Sukideka!!~BigLove????~" (スキデカ！~スキはデカく回顧録？~) (with La+ Darknesss)	2025	—	—	Secret Order
"Baku Love Chemistry" (爆ラブ＋ケミストリー)	2025	—	—	Chemical Spark
"Kanseitouyori" (管制塔より)	2026	—	—	Chemical Spark
"NaN Game"	2026	—	—	Chemical Spark
"Pink Ni Nattyae" (ピンクになっちゃえ)	2026	—	92	Chemical Spark
"Rising San" (RISING 酸)	2026	—	—	Chemical Spark
"—" denotes releases that did not chart.

==== As Secret Society HoloX ====
Title	Year	Peak chart positions		Album
Title	Year	JPN Dig.	JPN DL	Album
"Jouya Repaint" (常夜リペイント)	2022	—	52	Secret Order
"Labyrinthine Labyrinth" (迷宮なラビリンス)	2023	—	45	Secret Order
"Kyouen Solidarity~Shake★Nabe~" (饗宴ソリダリティ~SHAKE★NABE~)	2023	—	50	Secret Order
"Cho Yume Dodekkai!" (ちょ〜ゆめドデッカい!)	2024	—	—	Secret Order
"Gyoukou Chronicle" (暁光クロニクル)	2024	48	—	Secret Order
"Gyouan Xdeath" (暁闇エクスデス)	2025	—	—	Secret Order
"Watcha Gatcha!!!!!!!!" (with Hololive Generation 5)	2026	—	—	Non-album single
"—" denotes releases that did not chart.

==== As collaborative artist ====
Title	Year	Peak chart positions			Album
Title	Year	JPN	JPN Dig.	JPN DL	Album
"Get the Crown" (with Hoshimachi Suisei, Tokino Sora, Natsuiro Matsuri, Aki Rosenthal, Momosuzu Nene, Oozora Subaru, Tokoyami Towa, and Kazama Iroha as Hoshimatic Project)	2024	—	30	36	Non-album singles
"Beep Beep" (as Hoshimatic Project)	2026	18	—	—	Non-album singles
"Oshitara Hikenai Koideshita" (推したら引けない恋でした) (with AZKi and Yukihana Lamy)	2026	—	—	—	Non-album singles
"—" denotes releases that did not chart.

== See also ==
- Neuro-sama, AI VTuber
