= Otonose Kanade =

VTuber and singer

- 音乃瀬奏
- Otonose Kanade as designed by Gomzi
- Other name: Monday-Chan
- Occupation: VTuber

YouTube information
- Channel: Kanade Ch. 音乃瀬奏 ‐ ReGLOSS
- Years active: 2023–present
- Subscribers: 848 thousand
- Views: 234 million
- Last updated: September 6, 2026
- Website: hololivepro.com

Otonose Kanade (Japanese: 音乃瀬奏) is a VTuber and singer affiliated with Hololive Production. She debuted on September 9, 2023. She is part of the ReGloss unit of Hololive DEV_IS, which performs together as a musical group.

== Career ==
Otonose Kanade is part of the ReGloss unit of Hololive DEV_IS, alongside Todoroki Hajime, Juufuutei Raden, Ichijou Ririka, and formerly Hiodoshi Ao. ReGloss operate together as a musical group. The group's first single was "Shunkan Heartbeat". Her character has long yellow hair, large round eyes, and her outfit is white with a musical motif. It was illustrated by Gomzi. Her on-stream persona is that of a kusogaki (brat). In her first livestream on September 9, 2023, she played the Yu-Gi-Oh! song "Passionate Duelists" with the recorder, something she also later recalled doing in her remote interview for the company.

Otonose livestreams herself singing weekly, the highest frequency among ReGloss members. In these livestreams, her singing is interspersed with banter designed to rile up her audience, the contrast of which Kohiki-an of Dengeki Online evaluated as their central merit. Takakage Ishizeki of ITmedia observed that many viewers were struck by this contrast. Her singing voice is also very different from her speaking voice. Her first cover song was of Egoist's "Namae no Nai Kaibutsu" and it reached one million views in less than a month; all of her many cover songs have reached one million views. On a livestream which began on March 26, 2024, Otonose sang "Shunkan Heartbeat" 100 times over 6 hours and 48 minutes. This was part of an effort announced on March 24 to have the ReGloss members reach 2.5 million total subscribers on YouTube before September so the group could hold a 3D concert. She gained about 11,000 subscribers during the livestream. The 2.5 million goal was reached in August and the 3D concert was held on September 28. Otonose reached 500,000 subscribers in October, the last member of ReGloss to do so.

Otonose first performed her first single, "Greatest", on April 20, 2025, during a concert held on her character's birthday, releasing the single on April 21. Her second single, "You & Aizu", was first performed and released under the same circumstances a year later. "You & Aizu" gained greater attention after it was included in the video game Hololive Dreams, which was released in July 2026; "You & Aizu" first appeared at #95 on the Billboard Japan Top Download Songs chart in April 2026, before reaching #93 on the same chart in August 2026. A 2026 Routledge study examined a comedic skit Otonose did during a livestream with Sakura Miko and Inugami Korone, finding that it exemplified the humor VTubers can make by contrasting their physical and virtual bodies. One of Otonose's common skits involve her taunting viewers during streams on Sundays that "tomorrow is Monday", which causes the real-time chat window to be filled with angry red emojis. "You & Aizu" makes mention of the joke and by July 2026 fans had begun referring to her with the nickname "Monday-chan" (月曜日ちゃん).

== Personal life ==
Otonose can speak Korean, Japanese, and English. Prior to auditioning for Hololive, she was living in South Korea, where she grew up, and attending university. She learned of Hololive from Houshou Marine. She took a leave of absence from the university and moved to Japan after debuting.

== Discography ==
=== Singles ===
==== As lead artist ====
Title	Year	Peak chart positions		Album	Ref.
Title	Year	JPN Dig.	JPN DL	Album	Ref.
"Greatest"	2025	31	35	Non-album single	
"Cheerful Vibes Echo"	2025	—	—	Snapshot	
"You & Aizu" (You & 合図)	2026	—	93	Non-album single	
"Iconic" (with Ichijou Ririka)	2026	—	—	TBA	
"Aishikake" (アイシカケ)	2026	—	—	Non-album single	
"—" denotes releases that did not chart.

==== As collaborative artist ====
Title	Year	Ref.
"Windy Traveler" (with IRyS, Tokino Sora, and Ayunda Risu)	2026	
"Boom! Boom! Tropica Vacation" (with Oozora Subaru, Shiranui Flare, Shirogane Noel, and Tsunomaki Watame)	2026	
