= Was It Worth It? =

Was It Worth It may refer to:

- "Was It Worth It?" (Children of Bodom song), 2011
- "Was It Worth It?" (Pet Shop Boys song), 1991
- "Was It Worth It?" a song by Keyshia Cole from the 2007 album Just like You
- "Was It Worth It?" a song by Kid Ink featuring Sterling Simms from the 2013 album Almost Home

== See also ==
- Worth It (disambiguation)
