= ReGloss discography =

Music by the VTuber music group

- Logo of ReGloss
- Studio albums: 2
- Live albums: 1
- Singles: 14
- Music videos: 10
- Remix EPs: 1
- Remix singles: 5

The discography of ReGloss, a VTuber music group formed by Hololive Production, consists of two studio albums, one live album, fourteen singles, one remix extended play, five remix singles, and ten music videos.

ReGloss debuted in September 2023, releasing its first single "Shunkan Heartbeat" on September 4. The girl group debuted with five members: Todoroki Hajime, Juufuutei Raden, Ichijou Ririka, Otonose Kanade, and Hiodoshi Ao. (Note: ReGloss was formed under and concurrently with Hololive DEV_IS, a branch of Hololive Production which declared its aim to be breaking new frontiers in VTubing, and which focused on music. A September 2026 reorganization of Hololive merged DEV_IS with the company's English, Indonesian, and Japanese branches.) Members of ReGloss livestream and upload videos on YouTube, with each member also releasing music independent of the group. The group performed its first online 3D concert on September 28, 2024, after the total subscribers on each members' YouTube channel reached a sum of 2.5 million. ReGloss released its eponymous first studio album in November 2024. Hiodoshi went on hiatus in March 2025 after being diagnosed with adjustment disorder and she ended activities on October 3, 2025. ReGloss released its second studio album, Snapshot, in November 2025, and performed its first in-person concert, Flashpoint, at Ariake Arena in December 2025. X-ReChord, an augmented reality concert, is set to take place in November 2026.

== Albums ==
=== Studio albums ===
List of studio albums, with selected details and chart positions
Title	Details	Peak chart positions			Sales
Title	Details	JPN	JPN Comb.	JPN Hot	Sales
ReGloss	Released: November 6, 2024; Label: Cover Corp; Formats: CD, digital download, streaming	8	8	8	JPN: 18,056
Snapshot	Released: November 12, 2025; Label: Cover Corp; Formats: CD, LP, digital download, streaming	7	7	60	JPN: 13,542

=== Live albums ===
List of live albums with selected details
Title	Details	Ref.
Flashpoint	To be released: 2026; Label: Cover Corp; Format: Blu-ray	

== Singles ==
List of singles with selected chart positions, showing year released and album name
Title	Year	Peak chart positions		Album
Title	Year	JPN Dig.	JPN DL	Album
"Shunkan Heartbeat" (瞬間ハートビート) (Todoroki, Juufuutei, Ichijou, Otonose, Hiodoshi)	2023	34	35	ReGloss
"Symmetry" (シンメトリー) (Todoroki, Juufuutei, Ichijou, Otonose, Hiodoshi)	2024	43	49	ReGloss
"Bubble Maybe" (泡沫メイビー) (Todoroki, Juufuutei, Ichijou, Otonose, Hiodoshi)	2024	—	—	ReGloss
"Feelingradation" (フィーリングラデーション) (Todoroki, Juufuutei, Ichijou, Otonose, Hiodoshi)	2024	35	41	ReGloss
"Sakura Mirage" (サクラミラージュ) (Todoroki, Juufuutei, Ichijou, Otonose, Hiodoshi (Note: Hiodoshi featured on the single but not on the version released in Snapshot.))	2025	27	30	Snapshot
"Midsummer Citrus" (ミッドサマーシトラス) (Todoroki, Juufuutei, Ichijou, Otonose, Hiodoshi)	2025	47	46	Snapshot
"Otoshi Banashi" (落噺) (Juufuutei)	2025	—	59	Snapshot
"Cheerful Vibes Echo" (Otonose)	2025	—	—	Snapshot
"Happiness Phenomenon" (Ichijou)	2025	—	—	Snapshot
"Birilla Birilla" (ビリラビリラ) (Todoroki)	2025	—	94	Snapshot
"Hour Time Yellow" (アワータイムイエロー) (Todoroki, Juufuutei, Ichijou, Otonose)	2025	—	65	Snapshot
"Lucky Loud" (Todoroki, Juufuutei, Ichijou, Otonose)	2026	—	65	TBA
"Worth It" (Todoroki and Juufuutei)	2026	—	84	TBA
"Iconic" (Ichijou and Otonose)	2026	—	—	TBA
"—" denotes releases that did not chart.

== Remixes ==
=== Extended plays ===
List of EPs, with selected details and chart positions
Title	Details	Peak chart positions	Sales
Title	Details	JPN Dig.	Sales
"Shunkan Heartbeat (Solo ver.)" 瞬間ハートビート (Solo ver.)	Released: December 29, 2023; Label: Cover Corp; Formats: Digital download, streaming	22	JPN: 205

=== Singles ===
List of remixes, showing year released
Title	Year	Ref.
"Xoverline Holiday Remix" (Todoroki, Juufuutei, Ichijou, Otonose)	2025	
"Lucky Loud (Juufuutei Raden Solo ver.)"	2026	
"Lucky Loud (Todoroki Hajime Solo ver.)"	2026	
"Lucky Loud (Otonose Kanade Solo ver.)"	2026	
"Lucky Loud (Ichijou Ririka Solo ver.)"	2026	

== Music videos ==
List of music videos, showing year released and director name
Title	Year	Director(s)	Ref.
"Shunkan Heartbeat"	2023	Gojima	
"Symmetry"	2024	Vsmb	
"Bubble Maybe"	2024	Ehre_origine	
"Feelingradation"	2024	John Nobu, Hiromu Oshiro	
"Midsummer Citrus"	2025	Sugino Haruto	
"Hour Time Yellow"	2025	Hiromu Oshiro	
"Flashpoint"	2025	Ehre_origine	
"Lucky Loud"	2026	Ehre_origine	
"Worth It"	2026	Motsu Nikomi	
"Iconic"	2026	Motsu Nikomi	
