= Worth It =

Worth It may refer to:

== Music ==
- Worth It (album), a 1996 album by Sammi Cheng
- "Worth It" (Danielle Bradbery song), 2018
- "Worth It" (Fifth Harmony song), 2015
- "Worth It" (Wanessa song), 2010
- "Worth It" (YK Osiris song), 2019
- Worth It (Offset and Don Toliver song), 2023
- "Worth It", a song by Beabadoobee from Fake It Flowers, 2020
- "Worth It", a song by Colbie Caillat from Along the Way, 2023
- "Worth It", a song by Destroy Lonely from If Looks Could Kill, 2023
- "Worth It", a song by Emma Bale, 2016
- "Worth It", a song by Kodaline from Politics of Living, 2018
- "Worth It", a song by Lil Yachty from Nuthin' 2 Prove, 2018
- "Worth It" (Raye song), 2023
- "Worth It", a song by Whitney Houston from I Look to You, 2009
- "Worth It", a song by YoungBoy Never Broke Again from Until Death Call My Name, 2018
- "Worth It (Perfect)", a song by Superfruit from Future Friends, 2017
- "Worth It", a song by Todoroki Hajime and Juufuutei Raden, 2026

== Television ==
- Worth It (TV series), an American online food show
- "Worth It" (Pose), a television episode
