= Takane Lui =

Japanese VTuber and singer

- 鷹嶺ルイ
- Takane Lui as designed by Kakage
- Occupations: VTuber; singer

YouTube information
- Channel: Lui ch. 鷹嶺ルイ - holoX -
- Years active: 2021–present
- Subscribers: 1.12 million
- Views: 495 million
- Last updated: November 2, 2026
- Website: hololivepro.com

Takane Lui (Japanese: 鷹嶺ルイ) is a Japanese VTuber and singer affiliated with Hololive Production. She debuted on November 27, 2021. Her livestreams often involve horror games or horse racing. She has released two albums, Liberty (2024) and Lapis Lazuli (2025), as well as the extended play Lieblings (2025).

== Early life ==
Takane Lui is from Ibaraki Prefecture. Her family run a sushi restaurant. While in high school, Takane attempted to become a professional golfer at her parents urging. She studied abroad in Thailand for some time and speaks some Thai. She also speaks English. She eventually came to work as a saleswoman for a black company. While working there, she learned of Hololive and became a fan of Houshou Marine. After hearing Houshou say that she had once worked at a black company, and Amane Kanata remark that her life had improved since joining Hololive, Takane quit her job and began auditioning for Hololive, as she had always wanted to be a singer, getting in after about a year of auditions.

== Career ==
Takane Lui is a member of Hololive's sixth generation, Secret Society HoloX, alongside La+ Darknesss, Hakui Koyori, Sakamata Chloe, and Kazama Iroha. In her lore, she is HoloX's executive. Her character has an appearance traditional to anime. Takane made her debut on November 27, 2021. In June 2022, Takane gained a 3D model. On November 16, 2024, Takane reached one million subscribers on YouTube.

In conversation, Takane is usually a tsukkomi (straight man). She frequently makes puns in her livestreams. Takane frequently hosts and organizes large events and collaborations. She also hosts a cooking show with Yuzuki Choco, in which Takane and Yuzuki cook food for a guest while conversing with them. Takane has also hosts livestreams where she only speaks English, as well as livestreams where she teaches English-speaking Hololive members Japanese. Takane also hosts the weekly late-night radio show Takane Lui no Bay wa Tomo o Yobu! (鷹嶺ルイのBAYは友を呼ぶ！) on Bay FM since 3 July 2026. She had previously held livestreams that were styled after late-night broadcasts and variety shows.

=== Horror games ===
Takane often plays horror games, despite the fact that she dislikes the genre. Prior to debuting, she had watched people livestream horror games and believed that doing so would be popular with her audience. In December 2021, she livestreamed herself playing the horror game Outlast, except the livestream ended if she screamed. The stream lasted 6 minutes, with the first 2 minutes consisting of an opening sequence, and it ended before she began the game, when she screamed after accidentally knocking over a tumbler while starting the game. She later held more livestreams attempting the challenge, completing about 14 minutes of the game, and also playing it again in a collaboration with Mori Calliope. Masahi Kigazawa of Inside Games praised the livestreams as fantastic entertainment. Takane mentioned the first livestream in a November 2022 Famitsu column which recommended horror games, and in December 2022 she played Outlast again, completing it during a marathon livestream. During the summer, Takane dedicates a week to playing horror games.

=== Horse racing ===
She is also a fan of horse racing, which originated when members of Nogizaka46, an idol group she is a fan of, became regulars on a horse racing show, at which point she began regularly watching it. She became more interested in horse racing after playing Umamusume: Pretty Derby. On December 25, 2022, the last Arima Kinen for jockey Yuichi Fukunaga, Takane livestreamed herself watching and betting on the race. She provided serious analysis of the horse racing during a livestream for the first time; Takane expressed satisfaction with watching the race, despite losing money on her bets. Afterwards, she began hosting regular horse racing prediction livestreams, doing so for nearly all major Japanese G1 races. The frequency of her livestreaming horse racing has gradually increased and in 2026 she livestreamed major Japanese G2 and G3 races, as well as non-Japanese races that feature a horse she is interested in. In her livestreams, she provides commentary on the horse racing; her bets are usually safe picks and a betting account she created while working as a saleswoman had grown from 610,000 yen to 900,000 yen at the time of the 2026 Shūka Shō.

=== Music ===
Takane Lui frequently releases cover songs and hosts karaoke livestreams. Her voice is an alto. Takane released her first single, "Overd", in June 2022. In June 2023, Takane hosted a livestream which pastiched a Japanese music TV show to coincide with her character's birthday, during which she first performed two singles, "Fools Fools Fools" and "First Cry". Takane was part of the music group Blue Journey. She released the singles "HoloHawk" in November 2023 and "Evil Eye Wink" in 2024.

Takane released her debut album, Liberty, on June 12, 2024. She released the extended play Lieblings on March 4, 2025. Takane released her second album, Lapis Lazuli, in December 2025. In a 2022 interview with Kai-You, Takane said she wanted to make an impact through her singing; she wondered if people did not associate her with singing due to her frequent playing of horror games. Her first solo in-person concert, Rebellion, is set to take place at Kanadevia Hall on December 16, 2026.

=== Collaborations ===
Takane appeared as a character in the manga HoloX Meeting. In September 2023, she collaborated with the Tentaka Brewery of Ōtawara in Tochigi Prefecture to release a mead, Flora: Rosa, in their Kyūbi (九尾) line. Taking into account her desire to add rose petals into the wine, Tentaka Brewery created the mead using local multifloral honey and petals. This mead won first place in the prestigious Mazer Cup in America that year in the category for slightly sweet experimental meads and in the "Best in Show" category, the first time a Japanese mead won the top prize in the contest.

Takane is a fan of the anime Code Geass: Lelouch of the Rebellion. She was made an official ambassador for the anime in 2025. An adaptation of Takane named Lui Hawkeye was added to the video game Super Robot Wars DD as one of its Code Geass characters. The title of her first concert, Rebellion, may be a reference to the anime.

== Discography ==
=== Studio albums ===
==== As lead artist ====
Title	Album details	Peak chart positions			Sales
Title	Album details	JPN	JPN Comb.	JPN Hot	Sales
Liberty	Released: June 11, 2024; Label: Cover Corp.; Formats: CD, digital download, streaming	5	8	7	JPN: 7,474
Lapis Lazuli	Released: December 3, 2025; Label: Cover Corp.; Formats: CD, digital download, streaming	13	19	— (Note: Lapis Lazuli did not enter the Billboard Japan Hot Albums chart, but peaked at number 11 on the Download Albums chart.)	JPN: 6,683
"—" denotes releases that did not chart.

==== As Secret Society HoloX ====
Title	Album details	Peak chart positions			Sales
Title	Album details	JPN	JPN Comb.	JPN Hot	Sales
Secret Order	Released: April 8, 2026; Label: Cover Corp.; Formats: CD, digital download, streaming	7	10	— (Note: Secret Order did not enter the Billboard Japan Hot Albums chart, but peaked at number 19 on the Download Albums chart.)	JPN: 10,665
"—" denotes releases that did not chart.

=== Extended play ===
==== As lead artist ====
Title	Album details	Peak chart positions		Sales
Title	Album details	JPN Dig.	JPN DL	Sales
Lieblings	Released: March 4, 2025; Label: Cover Corp.; Formats: Digital download, streaming	13	17	JPN: 317 (digital)

=== Singles ===
==== As lead artist ====
Title	Year	Peak chart positions		Album
Title	Year	JPN Dig.	JPN DL	Album
"Overd" (オーバード)	2022	—	36	Liberty
"Tsubasa"	2022	—	55	Liberty
"Fools Fools Fools" (ばかばっか)	2023	47	44	Liberty
"First Cry"	2023	—	48	Liberty
"HoloHawk" (ホロホーク)	2023	36	42	Liberty
"Evil Eye Wink" (魔眼ウインク)	2024	—	—	Liberty
"Zig-Zag"	2025	—	—	Lapis Lazuli
"Dare!?"	2025	—	—	Lapis Lazuli
"Get Lucky"	2025	—	—	Lapis Lazuli
"Private EyeZ" (with Kazama Iroha)	2025	—	—	Secret Order
"Anastasis Girl" (アナスタシスガール) (featuring La+ Darknesss)	2025	—	—	Lapis Lazuli
"Soar"	2026	—	—	TBA
"Heart & Peace" (ハートにピース)	2026	—	—	TBA
"Tri-Unity LoveSystem" (三位一体♡ラブシステム) (with FuwaMoco)	2026	—	—	Non-album single
"—" denotes releases that did not chart.

==== As Secret Society HoloX ====
Title	Year	Peak chart positions		Album
Title	Year	JPN Dig.	JPN DL	Album
"Jouya Repaint" (常夜リペイント)	2022	—	52	Secret Order
"Labyrinthine Labyrinth" (迷宮なラビリンス)	2023	—	45	Secret Order
"Kyouen Solidarity~Shake★Nabe~" (饗宴ソリダリティ~SHAKE★NABE~)	2023	—	50	Secret Order
"Cho Yume Dodekkai!" (ちょ〜ゆめドデッカい!)	2024	—	—	Secret Order
"Gyoukou Chronicle" (暁光クロニクル)	2024	48	—	Secret Order
"Gyouan Xdeath" (暁闇エクスデス)	2025	—	—	Secret Order
"Watcha Gatcha!!!!!!!!" (with Hololive Generation 5)	2026	—	—	Non-album single
"—" denotes releases that did not chart.

==== As collaborative artist ====
Title	Year	Peak chart positions
Title	Year	JPN DL
"Holotori Dance!" (Takanashi Kiara, Takane Lui, Pavolia Reine, Oozora Subaru, and Nanashi Mumei as Holotori)	2023	90
"—" denotes releases that did not chart.
