= Akai Haato =

Hololive Japanese VTuber

- 赤井はあと
- Akai Haato as designed by Haruyuki Nijou
- Born: August 10
- Occupation: Virtual YouTuber

YouTube information
- Channel: HAACHAMA Ch 赤井はあと
- Years active: 2018–present
- Genres: Livestreaming; Singing; Gaming
- Subscribers: 1.59 million
- Views: 285 million
- Last updated: September 9 2026
- Website: hololive.hololivepro.com/en/talents/akai-haato//

Akai Haato (Japanese: 赤井はあと, Hepburn: Akai Hāto), also known as Haachama (はあちゃま), is a Japanese virtual YouTuber (VTuber) affiliated with Hololive Production. She is part of Hololive (Japan) 1st Generation alongside Natsuiro Matsuri, Shirakami Fubuki, and Aki Rosenthal.

== Overview ==
From 2 May to 13 May 2018, Cover, the management company of Hololive, held a VTuber audition to find individuals with experience in live streaming and video uploading who wanted to challenge themselves as VTubers. The character designs and names of the five open spots that would later debut as Generation 1 were made public at the start of the audition. Artist Haruyuki Nijyou illustrated the design of Haato, and a 3D model was later created by Pompu Chou.

Haato's Twitter account was opened on 21 May 2018, while her YouTube channel was created on 24 May. She made her debut stream on 2 June 2018.

== Activity ==
Haato began her livestreaming activities in June 2018. Her livestreams mainly consist of chatting, gaming, and singing. Outside of livestreaming, Haato uploads short comedy skits, memes, and cooking videos on her YouTube channel. Haato studied in Australia and briefly in the Philippines until December 2020. As a result, she is one of the few members from the main Japanese branch of Hololive who can speak English.

On 27 September 2020, Haato, alongside Hololive (Japan) 4th Generation member Kiryu Coco, were suspended from all livestreaming and Twitter activities for three weeks following controversy when the two displayed Taiwan as a sovereign state while disclosing their YouTube channel's analytics, which sparked criticism from their Mainland Chinese audience. Haato returned to her activities on 19 October.

On 10 February 2021, Haato's YouTube channel surpassed 1 million subscribers, the 8th Hololive member to do so.

Haato had been hospitalized immediately after the Hololive 4th Fes concert on 18 March 2023, leading to a stop in her Hololive activities. She returned to streaming on November 1 the same year.

During a stream on 28 October 2025, Haato made a number of comments about her personal life and her VTuber career that, according to Hololive's parent company Cover Corp., had been "taken out of context and inappropriately circulated online as rumors", leading to other talents being "subjected to the arbitrary exaggeration and selective extraction of information as well as offensive behavior and defamation based on mere speculation." Cover recognizes that Haato made the comments "in a state of mental instability", and announced that Haato would be going on hiatus starting on October 31 to prioritize her wellbeing. In April 2026, Cover announced that Haato would be gradually resuming her activities, starting with pre-recorded videos and music releases.

== Discography ==
=== Singles ===
Title	Year	Peak chart positions	Note
Title	Year	JPN DL	Note
"Plasmagic Seasons!"	2021	—	Co-sung with Hololive's Yozora Mel, Shirakami Fubuki, Natsuiro Matsuri and Aki Rosenthal
"Red Heart"	2023	85	
"Infinity"	2023	—	
"Buta" (豚)	2023	89	
"Secret Garden"	2024	—	Co-sung with Hololive's Shirakami Fubuki, Natsuiro Matsuri and Aki Rosenthal
"BAN RTA"	2024	—	
"Who2"	2025	—	
"Cyber Pure Love Declaration" (電脳ぴゅあ推し大宣言)	2025	—	Co-sung with Hololive's Shirakami Fubuki, Natsuiro Matsuri and Aki Rosenthal
"Garbage♡Goutmet!!!" (めちゃゴミ♡完♡全♡食!!)	2025	—	
sensation -KANSHOKU- (感触)	2025	—	
Doll (お人形)	2025	—	
