= N.SSign discography =

- EPs: 5
- Reissue EPs: 2
- Single albums: 2
- Live albums: 2
- Singles: 16
- Promotional singles: 2

South Korean boy group N.SSign has released five extended plays, two reissue extended plays, two single albums, two live album, sixteen singles, and two promotional singles. (Note: As of March 2026.)

Prior to their debut, N.SSign released the digital albums Woo Woo and Salty, and its reissue Monologue. They made their official debut in 2023 with the extended play Birth of Cosmo, led by the single "Wormhole". Birth of Cosmo debuted at number 3 on the Circle Album Chart, and sold approximately 220,000 copies by the end of the year.

N.SSign made their debut in Japan later that same year, with the single "New Star". "New Star" debuted at number 3 on the Oricon Singles Chart, and sold approximately 30,000 copies.

== Extended plays ==
List of EPs with selected details, chart positions, and sales
Title	EP details	Peak chart positions			Sales
Title	EP details	KOR	JPN	JPN Hot	Sales
Salty	Released: April 18, 2023; Label: n.CH Entertainment; Formats: Digital download, streaming	—	— (Note: Salty did not enter the Oricon Albums Chart as it was not released physically, but it peaked at number 17 on the Digital Albums Chart)	—	JPN: 307 (dig.)
Birth of Cosmo	Released: August 9, 2023; Label: n.CH Entertainment; Formats: CD, digital download, streaming	3	6	—	KOR: 221,174; JPN: 21,181
Happy &	Released: February 15, 2024; Label: n.CH Entertainment; Formats: CD, digital download, streaming	1	12	41	KOR: 259,356; JPN: 11,550
Love Potion	Released: December 30, 2024; Label: n.CH Entertainment; Formats: CD, digital download, streaming	2	6	—	KOR: 212,936; JPN: 7,281
迷走路 -Way Out-	Released: September 30, 2026; Label: n.CH Entertainment; Formats: CD, digital download, streaming	—	8	57	JPN: 12,782
"—" denotes a recording that did not chart or was not released in that territory.

=== Reissue extended plays ===
List of reissue EPs with selected details, chart positions, and sales
Title	EP details	Peak chart positions		Sales
Title	EP details	KOR	JPN	Sales
Monologue	Released: May 27, 2023; Label: n.CH Entertainment; Formats: Digital download, streaming	—	—	—N/a
Tiger	Released: July 18, 2024; Label: n.CH Entertainment; Formats: CD, digital download, streaming	11	18	KOR: 52,531; JPN: 3,163
"—" denotes a recording that did not chart or was not released in that territory.

== Single albums ==
List of single albums with selected details, chart positions, and sales
Title	Album details	Peak chart positions		Sales
Title	Album details	KOR	JPN	Sales
Woo Woo	Released: January 2, 2023; Label: n.CH Entertainment; Formats: Digital download, streaming	—	— (Note: "Woo Woo" did not enter the Oricon Albums Chart as it was not released physically, but it peaked at number 12 on the Digital Albums Chart.)	JPN: 357 (dig.)
Funky Like Me	Released: January 13, 2026; Label: n.CH Entertainment; Formats: CD, digital download, streaming	5	35	KOR: 98,829; JPN: 1,582
"—" denotes a recording that did not chart or was not released in that territory.

== Special albums ==
List of special albums with selected details
Title	Album details
Itty Bitty	Released: June 13, 2025; Label: n.CH Entertainment; Formats: Digital download, streaming

== Live albums ==
List of live albums with selected details, chart positions, and sales
Title	Album details	Peak chart positions	Sales
Title	Album details	JPN	Sales
N.SSign 1st Arena Concert "Birth of Cosmo" Live Album	Released: November 6, 2024; Label: n.CH Entertainment; Formats: CD, digital download, streaming	28	JPN: 2,054 (phy.)
N.SSign Japan Tour "Everblue" Live Album	Released: October 13, 2025; Label: n.CH Entertainment; Formats: CD, digital download, streaming	— (Note: N.SSign Japan Tour "Everblue" Live Album did not enter the Oricon Albums Chart, but peaked at number 19 on the Digital Albums Chart.)	JPN: 157 (dig.)
"—" denotes a recording that did not chart.

== Singles ==
=== Korean singles ===
List of Korean singles, showing year released, selected chart positions, and name of the album
Title	Year	Peak chart positions	Album
Title	Year	KOR DL	Album
"Woo Woo"	2023	—	Woo Woo
"Salty"	2023	—	Salty
"Monologue"	2023	—	Monologue
"Higher"	2023	—	Birth of Cosmo
"Wormhole"	2023	—	Birth of Cosmo
"Happy &"	2024	173	Happy &
"Funk Jam"	2024	—	Happy &
"Love, Love, Love Love Love!"	2024	—	Happy &
"Tiger (New Flavour)"	2024	—	Tiger
"Love Potion" (백일몽; 白日夢)	2024	9	Love Potion
"Itty Bitty"	2025	—	Itty Bitty
"Funky Like Me" (feat. Peak & Pitch)	2026	154	Funky Like Me
"—" denotes a recording that did not chart or was not released in that territory.

=== Japanese singles ===
List of Japanese singles, showing year released, selected chart positions, and name of the album
Title	Year	Peak chart positions		Sales	Album
Title	Year	JPN	JPN Hot	Sales	Album
"New Star"	2023	3	17	JPN: 30,570	Non-album singles
"Everblue"	2024	5	40	JPN: 24,873	Non-album singles
"Funky Like Me" (Japanese version) (Note: "Funky Like Me" (Japanese version) is included in N.SSign's third Japanese single "Feelin' Good".)	2026	—	—	—N/a	Non-album singles
"Feelin' Good"	2026	4	51	JPN: 19,039	Non-album singles
"Look At Me Now!"	2026	—	TBA	—N/a	迷走路 -Way Out-
"Dance On The Earth"	2026	—	TBA	—N/a	迷走路 -Way Out-
"—" denotes a recording that did not chart or was not released in that territory.

== Promotional singles ==
List of promotional singles, showing year released and name of the album
Title	Year	Album	Ref.
"In Summer"	2022	Stars Awakening OST	
"Sound Candy"	2023	Sound Candy OST	

== Other charted songs ==
List of other charted songs, showing year released, selected chart positions, and name of the album
Title	Year	Peak chart positions	Album
Title	Year	JPN DL	Album
"Wormhole" (Japanese version)	2023	72	"New Star"
