= Bancho =

Bancho may refer to:

- Banchō, an area in Tokyo, Japan
- Banchō (position), governmental position during the Ritsuryō period, or the leader of a group of delinquents
- Todoroki Hajime, Japanese VTuber nicknamed "Bancho"
  - "Bancho", a 2024 single by Todoroki
