= HoloX Meeting =

Japanese manga series

- holoX MEETing!
- Cover of the first tankōbon volume (clockwise from top left): Takane Lui, La+ Darknesss, Hakui Koyori, Kazama Iroha, and Sakamata Chloe.

ホロックスみーてぃんぐ！ (Horokkusu Mitingu!)
- Genre: Comedy, slice of life
- Created by: Cover Corporation
- Manga
- Written by: Omcurry G. K.
- Illustrated by: Anmitsu Okada
- Published by: Shueisha
- English publisher: NA: Yen Press
- Imprint: Jump Comics+
- Magazine: Shōnen Jump+
- Original run: November 1, 2022 – July 18, 2023
- Volumes: 2

HoloX Meeting, stylized as holoX MEETing! (Japanese: ホロックスみーてぃんぐ！, Hepburn: Horokkusu Mitingu!), is a Japanese manga series written by Omcurry G. K., based on a story by Cover Corporation, and illustrated by Anmitsu Okada. It is a fictional origin story of VTuber agency Hololive's sixth generation, Secret Society HoloX. The manga was serialized on Shueisha's Shōnen Jump+ from November 2022 to July 2023, with its chapters collected in two tankōbon volumes.

== Plot ==
HoloX Meeting is a fictional origin story of Hololive's sixth generation, Secret Society HoloX. The group debuted in November 2021 and consists of five VTubers: La+ Darknesss, Takane Lui, Hakui Koyori, Sakamata Chloe, and Kazama Iroha. Its first volume is centered from Sakamata's perspective, spends its early chapters introducing each member, and does not have a central plot, instead focusing on the relationship between characters. The second volume focuses on the interactions between characters in various situations. The series includes numerous references and callbacks to each HoloX member's livestreams. Its final chapter features an omake section and interviews with each VTuber. Its publisher billed the series as being a cute and energetic comedy.

Sakamata, an unclean and unemployed aspiring singer, is hired as the cleaner for HoloX, a secret society intent on world domination; Sakamata does not know if she is a cleaner in the janitorial sense or in the organized crime sense. She eventually concludes that her job is to clean up the worries of HoloX. Sakamata stays at its secret hideout, meeting and becoming friends with the other members of HoloX: Darknesss, its childish founder; Takane, its executive; Hakui, its researcher; and Kazama, its bodyguard. The group's goal of world domination originates with Darknesss, who does not know what it means, and the other members take it to mean making Darknesss happy or furthering the influence of HoloX. HoloX enters and wins a music competition, with Sakamata conquering her stage fright by wearing a mask. After their performance is criticized online, HoloX performs a free concert in a local park to prove their ability, which makes them popular. To further their plans for world domination, the group goes fishing, makes Darknesss some friends, collaborates with a toy company, works at a maid café, goes undercover at a high school, and locates a lost bag. After being discovered by Friend A, an event planner for Hololive, the group draws up a plan to defeat Hololive, its rival for world domination, before instead deciding to audition for the company, successfully joining it.

== Publication ==
The manga was written by Omcurry G. K., who works for Weekly Shōnen Jump, and its story was created by Cover Corporation, the corporate parent of Hololive Production. It was illustrated by Anmitsu Okada. The manga was launched on Shueisha's digital service Shōnen Jump+ on November 1, 2022. It was also launched in the December issue of Shuiesha's seinen manga magazine Ultra Jump, which was published on November 17. The manga's final chapter was published on Shōnen Jump+ on July 18, 2023. In Ultra Jump, which was one chapter behind Shōnen Jump+, the last chapter was published on August 19, its September issue.

HoloX Meeting was compiled into two tankōbon volumes. The first volume was released on April 4, 2023. The second volume was released on September 4, 2023; to commemorate the occasion, HoloX voiced over a portion of the manga on Jump's YouTube channel. English translations of the two volumes were released outside of Japan by Yen Press in 2024. They were translated by Jenny McKeon and lettered by Adnazeer Macalangcom.

No.	Original release date	Original ISBN	English release date	English ISBN
1	April 4, 2023	978-4-08-883537-2	February 20, 2024	978-1-9753-9152-2
2	September 4, 2023	978-4-08-883542-6	October 15, 2024	979-8-8554-0359-6

== Reception ==
Jenni Lada of Siliconera, while reviewing the first volume, felt that the series aided in understanding the lore and persona of HoloX members and supported its decision to base itself on that prior context. She also appreciated the omake content in the second volume. She said that the series was still an enjoyable read for readers with no prior knowledge of HoloX. However, Lada would later say that prior familiarity with HoloX was needed more so for HoloX Meeting when compared with other Hololive mangas. Bolts of Anime News Network, reviewing the first volume and declaring little familiarity with HoloX, said they enjoyed it and imagined HoloX fans greatly enjoying it, calling it a "must-buy" for them while also recommending it to unfamiliar readers who want "a fast-paced, cute comedy". They also felt that the references did not pad out the manga or impede its enjoyability and supported the decision to focus the first volume on Sakamata, saying her "every-man" persona allowed readers to identify with her. Bolts said that, despite HoloX Meeting essentially being a Hololive advertorial, it did not feel like one.

Lada felt that the series was not just a comedy series, but was also a slice of life series. She described portions of its first volume as "getting silly and ridiculous" while remaining "very genuine and joyful". Lada felt the manga was an engaging origin story and attributed her enjoyment of it to the preestablished personalities and background of the characters. She felt that the characters were both accurate to their official personas and the actual personality of the VTubers. Bolts described the humor of the first volume as being a good balance between wholesome and nonsensical, calling the manga's comedy one of its main selling points. They also praised the facial expressions of characters and felt that their designs had translated to print well. However, they said that the manga's panels were cluttered, which they said was especially felt when not in the group's messy hideout.

== See also ==
- Kizuna no Allele, an anime series based on the VTuber Kizuna AI
