= Juufuutei Raden =

Japanese VTuber

- 儒烏風亭らでん
- Juufuutei Raden as designed by Kaoming
- Born: Japan
- Occupation: VTuber

YouTube information
- Channel: Raden Ch. 儒烏風亭らでん ‐ ReGLOSS
- Years active: 2023–present
- Subscribers: 1.27 million
- Views: 223 million
- Last updated: October 3, 2026
- Website: hololivepro.com

Juufuutei Raden

Japanese name
- Kanji: 儒烏風亭らでん
- Kana: じゅうふていらでん
Transcriptions
- Romanization: Juufutei Raden

Juufuutei Raden (Japanese: 儒烏風亭らでん) is a Japanese VTuber affiliated with Hololive Production. She debuted on September 10, 2023. Juufuutei is a licensed curator and has a background in photography and art history. She frequently collaborates with museums. She is part of the ReGloss unit of Hololive DEV_IS, which performs together as a musical group. Juufuutei's first original song, "Maitake Dance", went viral.

== Early life ==
Juufuutei is from Fukuoka, a city on the Japanese island of Kyushu, and speaks the Hakata dialect. Juufuutei has a long-held interest in photography, was in her high school's photography club, and worked part-time at a photography studio. After discovering the work of American photographer Robert Mapplethorpe, she decided to pursue photography professionally. Juufuutei moved to Tokyo and began attending a vocational school, studying photography and videography. Juufuutei says that her interest in art increased and broadened while attending the vocational school, especially after seeing a Noh mask while visiting the Tokyo National Museum. During the COVID-19 pandemic, Juufuutei says she became very interested in rakugo, a form of Japanese verbal comedy.

After attending the vocational school for a brief period, an instructor encouraged her to pursue higher education. She then transferred to an art university where she majored in photography and also extensively studied art history. Her program allowed her to get a curatorial certification, which is required to work in specialized roles at museums. Juufuutei says she was particularly interested in educational outreach and public relations at museums. Juufuutei interned at a photography museum during her studies and also volunteered at museums. Juufuutei says she first learned of Hololive after watching the music video of the song "Shallys" by the Hololive-affiliated VTuber Aki Rosenthal. In an interview with Nikkei Cross Trend, Juufuutei said that after failing to find a job as a curator she searched for other ways to share her love of art, discovering auditions to join Hololive and successfully going through the process.

== Career ==
Juufuutei is part of the ReGloss unit of Hololive DEV_IS, alongside Otonose Kanade, Ichijou Ririka, Todoroki Hajime, and formerly Hiodoshi Ao. ReGloss operate together as a musical group. While official introductions made by Hololive Production usually contain a fictional backstory, a common theme in VTubing, Yugaming of KAI-YOU evaluated Juufuutei's as containing no fictional details. It describes her as a "grandma's girl", both traditional and innovative, who loves rakugo and all art. Yugaming was also struck by the official press release declaring that she has no money and buys too much alcohol. an an described her appearance as being a stylistic mix of Kabuki and Gothic Lolita. Her model has long black hair, with black and blond strands, and large pale-blue eyes. It was designed by Kaoming. Her character's birthday is February 4. Juufuutei's given name is derived from the Japanese decorative technique raden, and her surname includes the suffix -tei, which is used in rakugo to indicate a stage name.

儒烏風亭らでん🐚ReGLOSS
(@juufuuteiraden)
tweeted:

Japanese:

残金6,725円

Translation:

Remaining balance: 6,725 yen

September 4, 2023

On September 4, 2023, Juufuutei's debut was announced, and ReGloss released their first song, "Shunkan Heartbeat", on which Juufuutei provided vocals. The first post made by VTubers affiliated with large agencies, such as Hololive, garner a large amount of attention and usually consist of a carefully crafted introduction or joke. Juufuutei's first post, made on X shortly after her debut was announced, was to declare that she had 6,725 yen in her bank account. The contrast between what Yugaming evaluated as a mundane statement and her vocals in "Shunkan Heartbeart", which Yugaming found impressive, was the subject of conversation among viewers.

Juufuutei's livestream debut was on September 10. Her first livestream on YouTube was 30-minutes long and began with a monologue; after talking constantly for the entirety of the 30 minutes, she delivered a brief 30-second introduction. During the livestream, her character wore a Noh mask; at the 7-minute mark, she began drinking alcohol, and she would later declare her desire to smoke a cigarette. Her second livestream, the next day, contained a proper introduction. Juufuutei received the most attention among ReGloss members after debuting. In the streams following her debut, she discussed her love of alcohol, smoking, and pachislot machines, noting that she could not stream while sober, had been prohibited by management from using slot machines until her channel was monetized, and that she used a kiseru, a traditional smoking pipe. Also noting her affinity for rakugo and artistic background, Yugaming and Nijiki Kusano of Real Sound concluded that her persona was unlike those traditionally associated with Hololive Production. In late 2023, Juufuutei said that since debuting she had quit smoking and had not found the time to gamble. On December 24, 2024, Juufuutei's YouTube channel surpassed 1 million subscribers.

In August 2026, Juufuutei Raden was named as one of Forbes Japan's 30 Under 30 for 2026. In an interview with Forbes, she mused about her role in blurring the boundary between high culture and subculture, opining that "manga, anime, and VTubers are the ones who can freely move between them".

=== Rakugo ===
Juufuutei mentioned that she likes the rakugoka Shunpūtei Shōya in a January 2024 interview. This led to her being invited onto the radio show BayFM It!! on Bay FM co-hosted by Shunpūtei on February 28. She has since become his unofficial apprentice and has made repeated appearances on BayFM It!!, becoming known as a semi-regular on the program. Juufuutei wrote a story in volume 7 of the manga Chainsmoker Cat which incorporated elements of rakugo storytelling.

=== Museum collaborations ===
On X, Juufuutei frequently shares detailed information about museum exhibitions. In livestreams, she talks about how she appreciates art both for its physical and psychological properties. While playing horror video games, Juufuutei often identifies the architectural style of buildings, discussing the style and its history. She also collaborates with other VTubers with academic backgrounds. Juufuutei films videos at artistic sites, reporting on them on location.

In January 2024, Juufuutei livestreamed a collaboration with the Mitsui Memorial Museum, where she displayed and provided commentary on photographs provided by the museum of an exhibition. Juufuutei's first collaboration on her channel with a member of Hololive not in ReGloss was with Omaru Polka. In their livestream collaboration, Juufuutei recommended various museums she liked; the websites of all of the museums crashed during the livestream due to the surge of traffic. In July 2024, it was announced that Juufuutei would provide an audio guide for a temporary exhibition at the Hakone Venetian Glass Museum from July 2024 to January 2025. This was followed by another exhibition at the same museum where Juufuutei and Hololive-affiliated VTuber Hakui Koyori provided the children-orientated audio guide from January to July 2025. In March 2025, Juufuutei introduced an exhibition on French artist Émile Gallé for the Suntory Museum of Art. She has also collaborated with the Tainan Art Museum and the Shizuoka Prefectural Museum of Art.

In October 2025, Juufuutei revealed that she donated "several million yen" to a crowdfunding campaign of the Tokyo National Museum for the conservation and restoration of a late Edo-period byōbu depicting scenes from The Tale of Genji painted by court painter Tosa Mitsuzane found in an old Tokyo residence slated for demolition. She also rallied viewers to contribute to the campaign, leading the campaign to finish with a total of over 70 million yen donated, far exceeding the original goal of 30 million. The museum's account on the crowdfunding website thanked her "while crying and with hands trembling", in their own words. The museum later invited her and her VTuber friends on a guided tour to see the restoration process in person. In April 2026, Juufuutei was made a special supporter of an exhibition on The Tale of Genji co-hosted by the Tokyo National Museum and the Kyoto National Museum. A collaboration with the Tokyo National Museum, including an audio guide by Juufuutei and the display of new artwork, is set to take place from January to March 2027.

In December 2025, Juufuutei was one of 30 art critics, curators, and researchers asked by the art magazine Bijutsu Techo to name their three favorite exhibitions of the year. In February 2026, to coincide with her birthday, a group of Juufuutei fans placed advertisements for her in 13 museums across Japan. The effort cost approximately 100,000 yen. Their goal was to promote Juufuutei and the museums. Many museums were supportive of the efforts. Some allowed the fans to place the advertisements without charge, which allowed them to be placed in 13 museums instead of the originally planned 8. Others, such as the Museum of Modern Ceramic Art in Gifu, added to the display by placing life-size panels of Juufuutei next to the advertisement. The curator of the Sake Museum in Nishinomiya observed that they had seen visitors come from across Japan and an increase in young male visitors in particular, attributing it to the advertisement. Portions of her 2026 birthday celebration livestream featured footage of the Shizuoka Prefectural Museum of Art, for which she had previously created audio guides. In May 2026, a collaboration was announced between Juufuutei and the National Gallery in London centered on Vincent van Gogh's Sunflowers, J. M. W. Turner's Rain, Steam and Speed – The Great Western Railway, and Claude Monet's The Water Lily Pond; it included Juufuutei creating an audio guide which can be used in the National Gallery and a video of ReGloss visiting it. In September, it was announced that Juufuutei would collaborate with Okayama Castle from September to November 2026 as part of the 60th anniversary of its rebuilding. A book by Juufuutei about art and museums is set to be published by Kadokawa in January 2027.

==== Video game ====
In June 2025, the video game Juufuutei Raden's Guide for Pixel Museum was released. It is a puzzle game by Jupiter Corporation and part of the Picross series. In the game, players solve puzzles to complete illustrations of pieces of art. After solving puzzles, players are given information on the history of the piece of art and commentary on it by Juufuutei. The game also includes illustrations of Juufuutei. It was initially released on Steam and Nintendo Switch, before later being released on PlayStation 4, Windows, and Xbox. A DLC focused on Hakone is scheduled for December 2026.

=== Other collaborations ===
In June 2025, Juufuutei and Todoroki collaborated with the insect repellent brand Earth Pharmaceutical. She has appeared on the radio program of manga artist Yamazaki Mari. She has also collaborated with Japanese-Taiwanese glove puppetry series Thunderbolt Fantasy. She has also collaborated with the company Kurand to supervise the creation of a themed sake, and she has also collaborated with the Kavalan Distillery.

=== Music ===
Juufuutei has released singles themed around rakugo, Japanese art history, and travel.

==== "Maitake Dance" ====
On May 29, 2024, while answering viewer donations during a livestream, Juufuutei repeated the phrase "maitake maitake", saying it was a tune for situations when a recording session ended early. Maitake, which literally means "dancing mushroom", is punned with maita (巻いた), which is used to indicate spare time. Bakakun Sansei (ばかくん三世), who has long-made animations related to Hololive, remixed the catchphrase and animated it. His animations feature miniature versions of VTubers, which Kaeru Inaka of Real Sound evaluated as more approachable and adorable than the normal characters, and Inaka also praised his ability to synchronize animations with the rhythm of tunes. Juufuutei posted the video to her YouTube channel on August 6. Within three weeks, it garnered over 2 million views; the song further went viral on TikTok and similar platforms. This spawned videos mimicking the dance. "Maitake Dance" is part of the Mushroom Dance series of videos, and Juufuutei had released "Matsutake Dance" prior to "Maitake Dance", which originated as a tune Juufuutei sang while getting ready for stream. On October 16, Mezamashi TV featured the song as a current trend. On October 30, "Maitake Dance" was digitally released as her first original song. "Maitake Dance" won the 2024 Internet Buzzword Award, which is voted on by the public. A survey of elementary school children ranked it as their fourth favorite buzzword. Inaka stated that the popularity of "Maitake Dance" – specifically its popularity as a short-form animation – signaled the beginning of a new age for anime and the internet.

== Bibliography ==
- Juufuutei, Raden (January 28, 2027). 儒烏風亭らでん、芸術偏愛ことはじめ. Supervised by Masato Matsushima of the Tokyo National Musuem. Kadokawa. ISBN 9784041179178

== Discography ==
=== Singles ===
==== As lead artist ====
Title	Year	Peak chart positions		Album	Ref.
Title	Year	JPN DS	JPN DL	Album	Ref.
"Maitake Dance" (まいたけダンス)	2024	26	22	Non-album singles	
"Shimeji Dance" (しめじダンス)	2024	—	—	Non-album singles	
"Matsutake Dance" (まつたけダンス)	2024	—	—	Non-album singles	
"Shiitake Dance" (しいたけダンス)	2024	—	—	Non-album singles	
"Eringi Dance" (エリンギダンス)	2024	—	—	Non-album singles	
"Kaentake Dance" (カエンタケダンス)	2025	—	—	Non-album singles	
"Otoshi Banashi" (落噺)	2025	—	59	Snapshot	
"Japan no bijutsushi oboemasho" (JAPANの美術史♪お·ぼ·え·ま·SHOW!)	2025	—	—	Non-album singles	
"debayashi japonism" (出囃子ジャポニズム)	2026	—	—	Non-album singles	
"Miracle Palette"	2026	—	83	Non-album singles	
"Worth It" (with Todoroki Hajime)	2026	—	84	TBA	
"Raden no Tabiplan" (らでんの旅ぷらん)	2026	—	81	Non-album single	
"—" denotes releases that did not chart.

==== As collaborative artist ====
Title	Year	Ref.
"KaienSpectacle" (怪宴スペクタクル) (with Natsuiro Matsuri, Vestia Zeta, Nerissa Ravencroft, and Todoroki Hajime)	2026	
