= Mistress Kanan Is Devilishly Easy =

Japanese manga series

- First tankōbon volume cover, featuring Kanan Takakiyo

カナン様はあくまでチョロい (Kanan-sama wa Akumade Choroi)
- Genre: Romantic comedy
- Manga
- Written by: Nonco
- Published by: Kodansha
- English publisher: NA: Seven Seas Entertainment
- Imprint: Shōnen Magazine Comics
- Magazine: Weekly Shōnen Magazine
- Original run: June 1, 2022 – present
- Volumes: 14
- Anime television series
- Directed by: Yasushi Muroya
- Written by: Rintarō Ikeda
- Music by: Shūhei Mutsuki
- Studio: Studio Kai
- Licensed by: Crunchyroll; SEA: Medialink
- Original network: Tokyo MX, BS11
- Original run: April 5, 2026 – present
- Episodes: 12
- icon

Mistress Kanan Is Devilishly Easy (カナン様はあくまでチョロい, Kanan-sama wa Akumade Choroi) is a Japanese manga series written and illustrated by Nonco. It began serialization in Kodansha's shōnen manga magazine Weekly Shōnen Magazine in June 2022. An anime television series adaptation produced by Studio Kai aired from April to June 2026. A second season is set to premiere in 2027.

== Plot ==
The chair of the discipline committee at Tama Municipal Votive Academy, popular and athletic female student Kanan Takakiyo, is actually a demon coming from the demon world to devour human souls. One day, Kanan targets and summons a junior student, Yōji Kyōgi, but Yōji falls in love with her and, after much pushing around, they end up going out together. Kanan, who is new to romance, is charmed by the assertive Yōji, and is drawn to him. Kanan and Yōji are also joined by Ami, Kanan's maid, and Jeanne, a clumsy apostle of God from the heavenly realm.

== Characters ==
Kanan Takakiyo (高潔 カナン, Takakiyo Kanan)
Voiced by: Aoi Koga (Japanese); Corey Pettit (English)
A demon girl and the head of the school discipline committee. She lacks experience in love, to the point that she believes in misunderstandings about relationships.
Yōji Kyōgi (供犠 羊司, Kyōgi Yōji)
Voiced by: Seiichiro Yamashita (Japanese); Bradley Gareth (English)
A junior student who, despite getting possessed at the start, became madly in love with Kanan. He would do anything to ensure that he and Kanan are a couple.
Jeanne (ジャンヌ, Jannu)
Voiced by: Sayumi Suzushiro
An angel girl sent from Heaven with her halo-shaped hair and a stigmata mark under her bellybutton. Her goal is to keep Yōji safe from the devil such as Kanan, despite being unaware that she herself is doing something lewd to him.
Ami (アミ)
Voiced by: Maki Kawase (Japanese); Darien McArthur (English)
A Succubus maid from the demon realm who always takes care of Kanan. After learning about Kanan being Yōji's girlfriend, she does many attempts to make sure that they kiss on the lips, even by force. She is dating Yuriko, Kanan's homeroom teacher, and they often kiss and have sex.
Nadeko Masurao (益荒男 撫子, Masurao Nadeko)
Voiced by: Ayaka Nanase (Japanese); Marianne Bray (English)
A childhood friend and classmate of Yōji. She tends to hide her tendencies upon meeting Kanan and finding out that Kanan is Yōji's girlfriend. She also doesn't like when Yōji calls her by her surname, insisting he addresses her by her first name. She enjoys being verbally abused by Kanan.
Milch Zebul (ミルチ・ゼブル, Miruchi Zeburu)
Voiced by: Fūka Izumi
Kanan's middle sister. She is a prankster who easily triggers Kanan, her own big sister, by teasing her when Kanan fell in love with Yōji, a human boy.
Miel Zebul (ミエル・ゼブル, Mieru Zeburu)
Voiced by: Hikaru Tono
Kanan's little sister. She has her cold stare when she thinks her sister Kanan and her mother Lilim are being harassed by Yōji.
Lilim Zebul (リリム・ゼブル, Ririmu Zeburu)
Voiced by: Yoshino Nanjō
Kanan's mother. She has a severe case of androphobia, her fear of men, despite marrying Beelzebub. She is still afraid after coming in contact with Yōji, Kanan's boyfriend, though she got over her fear and treats him like her son soon after.
Beelzebub (ベルゼブブ, Beruzebubu)
Voiced by: Takaya Kuroda (Japanese); Cris George (English)
The Archdemon of Gluttony in the demon realm and Kanan's father. Due to Lilim's androphobia, he usually wears a large suit to cover his appearance. He initially distrusts Yōji becoming close to Kanan, but they later bond and he accepts him as her love interest.
Yuriko Yurino (百合野ゆり子, Yurino Yuriko)
Voiced by: Yui Ogura
A homeroom teacher of Class where Kanan is attending at. She is dating Ami, the maid who takes care of Kanan, and they often kiss and have sex.
Yui Rorikawa (魯李川ゆい, Rorikawa Yui)
Voiced by: Ayana Taketatsu
A homeroom teacher of Class 1-2 where Yōji is attending at.
Ryoko Reizen (冷然涼子, Reizen Ryoko)
Voiced by: Yū Kobayashi
A nurse from the Tama Municipal Votive Academy.
Tekka Shinryuji (神龍寺鉄火, Shinryūji Tekka)
Voiced by: Misato Matsuoka
Hanako Ohanabatake (お花畑花子, Ohanabatake Hanako)
Voiced by: Miku Itō
Lily Kageno (影野リリー, Kageno Riri)
Voiced by: Miyu Tomita
Kyogi Koko (供犠虎恋, Koko Kyougi)
Voiced by: Lynn

== Media ==
=== Manga ===
Written and illustrated by Nonco, Mistress Kanan Is Devilishly Easy began serialization in Kodansha's shōnen manga magazine Weekly Shōnen Magazine on June 1, 2022. The series' chapters have been collected into fourteen volumes as of August 2026.

In October 2025, Seven Seas Entertainment announced that they had licensed the series for English publication in a 2-in-1 omnibus release. The first omnibus volume released in July 2026.

No.	Original release date	Original ISBN	English release date	English ISBN
1	October 17, 2022	978-4-06-529360-7	July 14, 2026	979-8-89765-761-2
1. "Easy Kana"; 2. "Kanan-sama Goes on a Walk"; 3. "Together with Kanan-sama"; 4. "Kanan's Heart-Racing Trip to School"; 5. "Call Me Kanan"; 6. "Kanan's First Time"; 7. "Kanan-sama Is Sniffed"; 8. "Ami Has Arrived"; 9. "Now Ami's Done It"; 10. "Nadeko's in Danger"; 11. "Kanan's Lessons to Make You Understand"; 12. "Kanan's Approach"; 13. "Kanan's Date Trap"; 14. "Kanan's First Date"
2	January 17, 2023	978-4-06-530348-1	July 14, 2026	979-8-89765-761-2
15. "Kanan Ecstasy"; 16. "Kanan's Pool Trouble"; 17. "Ami's Power Cupid"; 18. "Kanan's Sleepy Surprise"; 19. "Nadeko's Liberating Study Session"; 20. "Kanan and the Summer Promise"; 21. "Kyougi Love Evangelism"; 22. "Jeanne and the Demon"; 23. "Kanan vs. Jeanne"; 24. "Jeanne's Primary Education" (Health and Phys Ed. Arc); 25. "Kanan's Zero-Distance Love"; 26. "Kanan's First Time Playing Hooky"; 27. "Kanan's Thrilling Outfit Change"; 28. "Kanan and Kyougi's Youth"
3	April 17, 2023	978-4-06-531255-1	November 24, 2026	979-8-89765-921-0
4	August 17, 2023	978-4-06-532611-4	November 24, 2026	979-8-89765-921-0
5	December 15, 2023	978-4-06-533901-5	March 23, 2027	979-8-89765-922-7
6	March 15, 2024	978-4-06-534867-3	March 23, 2027	979-8-89765-922-7
7	July 17, 2024	978-4-06-536133-7	—	—
8	November 15, 2024	978-4-06-537436-8	—	—
9	April 16, 2025	978-4-06-539091-7	—	—
10	July 16, 2025	978-4-06-540010-4	—	—
11	October 17, 2025	978-4-06-541114-8	—	—
12	January 16, 2026	978-4-06-542214-4	—	—
13	April 16, 2026	978-4-06-543327-0	—	—
14	August 17, 2026	978-4-06-544640-9	—	—
15	December 16, 2026	978-4-06-546199-0	—	—

=== Anime ===
An anime television series adaptation was announced on April 15, 2025. It will be produced by Studio Kai and directed by Yasushi Muroya, with series composition by Rintarō Ikeda, characters designed by Akari Minagawa, and music composed by Shūhei Mutsuki. The series aired from April 5 to June 21, 2026, on Tokyo MX and BS11. The opening theme song is "Hatsukoi Moment" (初恋モーメント; 'First Love Moment'), performed by Faulieu, and the ending theme song is "Pop, Snack, Junk na Hunny" (ポップ・スナック・ジャンクなHUNNY), performed by Aogiri High School. Crunchyroll is streaming the series. Medialink licensed the series in Asia-Pacific.

Following the airing of the final episode of the first season, a second season was announced. The season, titled Mistress Kanan Is Devilishly Easy 2 EASY (カナン様はあくまでチョロい 2 EASY, Kanan-sama wa Akumade Choroi 2 EASY), is set to premiere in 2027.

==== Episodes ====
No.	Title	Directed by (Note: Production staff information is taken from the ending credits of each episode.)	Written by	Storyboard by	Original release date
1	"Kanan's Easy"; Transliteration: "Kanachoro" (Japanese: カナチョロ)	Yasushi Muroya	Rintarō Ikeda	Yasushi Muroya	April 5, 2026
Demon Kanan the Gourmet grows bored of demon world cuisine and decides to gorge herself on human souls. She transfers to Hounou Academy and is quickly elected President of the Disciplinary Committee where she can keep the student’s souls free of sin and deliciously pure. She notices student Youji Kyougi’s soul brims with vitality, but when she describes her plan to devour him, Youji assumes she is into erotic sex. Kanan panics at his eager confession as she is a virgin, accidentally agreeing to be his girlfriend. Youji’s friend Nadeko causes Youji to realise he and Kanan know nothing about each other. Kanan is surprised she likes Youji using her first name. Youji tries to plan a date but Kanan assumes he is talking about sex, so she rejects his suggestions of doing it in public places and demands it be his bedroom, only realising her mistake after already agreeing. Youji asks to hold hands, but being inexperienced Kanan believes this causes pregnancy, so she ties his hands together, accidentally exciting him. Youji buys croquettes for them and Kanan is amazed by how good they are, then remembers a lesson her father Beelzebub taught her; eating with someone else makes food taste better.
2	"Ami Has Arrived"; Transliteration: "Ami Kichatta" (Japanese: アミきちゃった)	Arata Nishizuki	Rintarō Ikeda	Shigenori Kageyama	April 12, 2026
Beelzebub worries about Kanan, so he sends demon Ami to be Kanan's maid. Kana is revealed to have hypnotised the human Takakiyo family into thinking she is their daughter so she has somewhere to live. Youji begins walking Kanan to school. Ami arrives at Hounou, irritating Kanan as Ami is a succubus who will seduce anybody. Ami immediately senses Youji's powerful soul and tries to seduce him, until Kanan jealously claims he is her boyfriend. Ami is thrilled, but also surprised Youji shows no interest in her. Ami begins draining vitality from students, annoying Kanan as she has been working to keep their souls pure and Ami has already tainted them. Kanan demands Ami keep her succubus activities off school property but worries that Youji will be seduced by her. She enlists Youji onto the Disciplinary Committee to keep an eye on him, but helping others only makes him more popular with girls. Youji finds her jealousy cute so he gives her head pats, exciting Kanan until she purrs like a cat. Privately, Ami hopes Kanan might have found real happiness but also wonders what will happen if Beelzebub finds out Kanan is dating a human.
3	"Kanan's First Date"; Transliteration: "Kanan no Hatsu Dēto" (Japanese: カナンの初デート)	Masahiko Suzuki	Rintarō Ikeda	Yasushi Muroya	April 19, 2026
Kanan catches Youji eating lunch with Nadeko and is convinced she wants to steal Youji. Panicking at Kanan's rage, Nadeko claims she is not interested in Youji, with Kanan only calming down when she claims Kanan would be a perfect wife. Kanan decides she likes Nadeko, even if she is a lower life form. The insult gives Nadeko a confused feeling. Ami reminds Kanan not to get too attached to Youji or she might struggle to eat his soul. Kanan decides to manipulate Youji into offering her his soul himself. Despite her awkwardness, Kanan eventually asks Youji on a normal date to the Sky Tower, hoping to use his nervousness at heights to make him feel more affection for her. Unfortunately, Youji avoids letting her touch him, with Kanan eventually realising she was so nervous choosing an outfit she forgot to wear a bra. She awkwardly claims she did it on purpose to impress him, then is horrified that he wants to touch them. Over lunch she tries to be mean to him, but Youji is just happy to see her smiling. Kanan worries she might actually be falling in love, so she delays eating his soul until she knows for sure.
4	"Ami the Forceful Cupid"; Transliteration: "Ami no Pawā Kyūpiddo" (Japanese: アミのパワーキューピッド)	Yū Yabuuchi	Rintarō Ikeda	Takahiro Tanaka	April 26, 2026
Ami decides to help Kanan and Youji kiss. Kanan tries to stay away from Youji while she is sweaty, but Youji insists on sniffing her. She is angry to realise he was just smelling the detergent on her clothing, but when she uses his towel, she enjoys his scent and fears she is becoming a pervert. Kanan suspects her demonic hearing is deteriorating so Ami suggests an ear-cleaning with Youji. Kanan agrees, unaware having super-hearing means her ears are super sensitive. Overhearing through the door, Nadeko assumes from Kanan moaning they are having sex. During a hot day Ami lures Kanan into wearing bikinis, but Kanan cannot handle Youji watching her with lust so she tries to leave, but slips on top of him. Despite Ami's urging, they refuse to kiss. Ami tries several times to get them to touch each other, but only gets them close enough to rub noses, embarrassing Kanan. Ami starts to doubt Kanan has any charm at all, so Kanan pretends to be asleep in sexy poses to entice Youji. Unfortunately, Youji suppresses his lust, so Kanan also starts to fear she is charmless, until Youji pokes her cheek then runs away in shame. Ami is disappointed, but Kanan is thrilled Youji finally touched her.
5	"Kanan and the Saint"; Transliteration: "Kanan to Seijo" (Japanese: カナンと聖女)	Katsuyuki Komai	Rintarō Ikeda	Hikaru Mitsuki	May 3, 2026
A nun named Jeanne transfers into Youji's class and claims she is a Saint from Heaven. As Youji has a pure soul he will be a Saint in the future, so Jeanne has been sent to protect him from a demon. Kanan rushes to retrieve Youji from Jeanne's breasts. Kanan suspects Heaven knows about her, but luckily Jeanne appears to be an idiot. Jeanne eventually realises Kanan is the demon. Kanan is furious when Jeanne holds Youji's hand, which Kanan has not managed to do yet, so she dubs Jeanne the "Slut Saint". She and Ami discover Jeanne is living homeless in a cardboard church she built. Jeanne explains she is ministering to innocent souls in exchange for food donations, though it turns out the "innocent souls" are all perverts paying snacks to rest their heads in her lap. Feeling bad for how naïve Jeanne is, Kanan admits she has no plans to corrupt Youji's soul. Jeanne is confused when Ami claims Kanan wants to have sex with Youji. As Jeanne has no idea what sex is, Ami gives her a scandalous sex education lesson. The next day, with Jeanne still shell-shocked from learning about sex, Kanan holds Youji's hand while walking home, delighting him.
6	"Kanan's First Time Skipping"; Transliteration: "Kanan no Hatsu Sabori" (Japanese: カナンの初サボリ)	Masahiko Suzuki	Rintarō Ikeda	Masahiko Suzuki	May 10, 2026
Kanan becomes jealous when Youji gazes upon Jeanne's sailor uniform so she decides to wear one herself. Suddenly, Youji barged in to become obsessed with Kanan's sailor uniform. Then, Kanan and Yoji hide in the locker room from Jeanne and Nadeko. When it looked like Youji is about to kiss Kanan on the lips, they come out of the locker room in front of Jeanne and Nadeko, and next to Ami and Yuriko who were hiding in a cabinet. The next day, Kanan and Youji are skipping school to go on a date at the beach, and they ended up getting wet by an ocean wave. Meanwhile, Ami is searching for Kanan in hopes to see her kissing Youji, and Jeanne was baited and forced to come along with Ami to search for them. At the Internet Cafe, while changing their clothes, Kanan was baffled when Youji bought her a latex outfit. Later, they went on a ride at the Ferris Wheel, and it turns out that Youji dragged Kanan to make memories with each other, while she thinks they were going to continue where they left off the other day. Apparently, they have been followed by Ami who supports Kanan to kiss Youji and by Jeanne who was trying to stop Kanan from getting to Youji. Exhausted, Kanan slept on Youji's shoulders as the sun sets.
7	"Kanan's Summer Break"; Transliteration: "Kanan no Natsuyami" (Japanese: カナンの夏休み)	Arata Nishizuki	Rintarō Ikeda	Arata Nishizuki	May 17, 2026
The final exam is coming up, and Kanan decides to help Youji and Nadeko study. During their studying time, Nadeko is feeling jealous that Kanan is scolding Youji for making his mistakes, and Nadeko wanted to be scolded by her, too. After the final exam is over, Summer Break is here, but Kanan just received a message from her parents: She is to spend her entire Summer at the Demon Realm. However, Youji insists that he wanted to go to the Demon Realm with Kanan, so she approves his permission. The next day, Kanan, Youji, Ami, Jeanne, and Nadeko went shopping at the Lingerie Store, and while the girls wore some exposing outfits, Kanan wore a cute bikini that is considered "childish", and somehow, Youji approves of it. The following night, a Demon Train appeared at the Train Station, and Kanan, Youji, Ami, and Jeanne all boarded the train to go to the Demon Realm. Upon riding on a train, the girls wanted to go to the bathroom, but because Kanan does not want Youji to know, she tries to hold it in. While they drank coffee made by Youji, he was going to the bathroom, but the girls could not hold it in any longer. In the epilogue, Kanan's sisters, Milch and Miel, are expecting their big sister to return home, with her "boyfriend".
8	"Kanan Returns to Her Family"; Transliteration: "Kanan no Tadaima Famirī" (Japanese: カナンのただいまファミリー)	Maki Kamiya; Yūma Imura	Rintarō Ikeda	Hidetoshi Namura	May 24, 2026
Kanan, Youji, Ami, and Jeanne have arrived at the Zebul Castle in the Demon Realm. While wandering around the castle, Youji met Lilim, Kanan's mother, whom she has Androphobia, her fear of men, before he met Kanan's sisters, Milch and Miel. Kanan reunited with her father, Beelzebub, and he and the rest of the Zebul Family thought Jeanne is Kanan's beloved. Kanan corrects them by saying that Youji is her boyfriend, shocking her family. However, Beelzebub refuses to accept Kanan's relationship with a human like Youji, unless she gets her entire Zebul Family to accept their blessings on Kanan and Youji. They tried to get Lilim to give them a stamp with Youji cosplaying as a girl and drinking an elixir to temporarily turn into a baby, but to no avail. Kanan then baked an apple cake for Youji, but when she tried to feed him, Milch took a bite on a cake first, before Milch fed him herself, triggering Kanan when she thought he had an indirect kiss from Milch. Lilim, after touching Youji, then fed him a cake as well. Meanwhile, Jeanne and Beelzebub are having a meal together. In the epilogue, Lilim was about to give Kanan a stamp of approval, but Youji must first pass a Test of Courage in a haunted Shrine.
9	"Lilim's Test of Defeat"; Transliteration: "Ririmu no Haiboku Tesuto" (Japanese: リリムの敗北テスト)	Katsuyuki Komai; Tomoma Yoshimura	Rintarō Ikeda	Takahiro Tanaka	May 31, 2026
While walking to the haunted Shrine, Lilim tells Kanan and Youji how she met Beelzebub several millennia ago, where she fell in love with him after he saved her from Dagon. After arriving, all Youji had to do to pass the Test of Courage is to climb on stairs and make it back, with Kanan tagging along. Lilim tried to get him to fail by seducing him, but she gets completely ignored. Just when she was about to give in, she gets ambushed by Kodagon, daughter of Dagon. As Youji and Lilim get tangled on, Kanan saved them from Kodagon. Lilim then sees how Youji reminded her of Beelzebub with a smile. Later, while taking a bath, Lilim decides to accept Youji's relationship with Kanan as a token of her appreciation. Even though she is married to Beelzebub, Lilim treats Youji like a son she never had, as she showers him with love until he passed out, right before Kanan passes out before she bathes him. Kanan wakes up in her bedroom with Youji sleeping next to her. Youji then landed on Kanan's lap, but then she bit him on a neck rather than kissing him. As they sleep in Kanan's bedroom, a stamp rally with Lilim's stamp of approval was shown. In the epilogue, while Kanan and Youji are eating breakfast, Jeanne is suddenly proposing to Youji.
10	"Milch's Bratty Memories"; Transliteration: "Miruchi no Mesugakimemorī" (Japanese: ミルチのメスガキメモリー)	Masahiko Suzuki	Rintarō Ikeda	Yasushi Muroya	June 7, 2026
Jeanne is proposing to Youji that they must leave the Demon Realm together. It turns out her personality changed after she was cleansed in the bath. Suddenly, the Head Maid accuses Jeanne of stealing Kanan's underwear and prepares to execute Jeanne. Then, Jeanne sees Milch and she chases after her, but Jeanne ended up getting stuck on a wall. When the Head Maid took off Jeanne's pants, she realizes that it wasn't Jeanne who stole it. Kanan suspects that Milch is the true culprit who stole her underwear because Milch hates her, so Youji went to search for Milch. He then accidentally ends up in Milch's secret room where he finds her not only with Kanan's underwear, but all of the Kanan merchandise as well. Several centuries ago, Milch was kind to Kanan, but then her personality changed when she teased Kanan by stealing her clothes. Milch tried to hide her truth from Youji, but it was futile and she finally gives in. Youji realizes that Milch loves Kanan so much, so he wanted her to confess everything she had done for Kanan. Despite all that, Milch continues to tease Kanan, so Kanan decides to punish Milch in order to force her to apologize. In the epilogue, Youji sees Miel, who runs away from him.
11	"Miel's Stolen Love"; Transliteration: "Mieru no Ubaware Rabu" (Japanese: ミエルの奪われラブ)	Arata Nishizuki	Rintarō Ikeda	Arata Nishizuki	June 14, 2026
A maid is watching a streaming video of "Honey Bunny" before getting scolded by the Head Maid. Meanwhile, after earning a stamp from Milch, Kanan plans to go to the beach so that Youji and Miel can get along. Then, Kanan hides Youji in her bed from Miel, and after Miel learns that Kanan "kissed" Youji the other night, she suddenly becomes jealous. Miel then starts streaming as "Honey Bunny", but when Youji came in to her room, she grabs an axe and starts chasing him. Just when she is about to kill him, Kanan shows up and gladly invites Miel to the beach. The next day, they arrived at the beach, and Miel is planning to keep Kanan all by herself, away from Youji. Miel applies a sunscreen on Kanan's entire body, but Miel's plan went awry. As Kanan and Youji are having fun, Jeanne suddenly shows up and makes a splash, and then Youji saves Kanan from drowning since she cannot swim. Miel then gives Kanan a drink for couples like Kanan and Youji, and suddenly, Miel gets turned on upon seeing them make some love, leaving Miel no choice but to give a stamp of approval. In the epilogue, Kanan has two days left before she and Youji leave the Demon Realm. Elsewhere, Jeanne is surrounded by monsters in a lake.
12	"Kanan and Kyougi's Trial of Love"; Transliteration: "Kanan to Kyōgi no Ai no Shiren" (Japanese: カナンと供犠の愛の試練)	Hisashi Isogawa	Rintarō Ikeda	Hisashi Isogawa	June 21, 2026
Kanan was dreaming that she and Youji are gonna have a good time in bed. In the last day, Kanan got jealous that Milch dubbed Youji as her "big brother" and kissed him on a cheek. In order for Beelzebub to give a final stamp, Youji must first pass one last trial: A game of beach volleyball where Youji teams up with Kanan against the team of Lilim, Miel, and Milch. Despite the distractions with Milch exposing Lilim to Youji, Kanan's team managed to win the beach volleyball game. When Beelzebub fished out a giant squid, Jeanne was spitted out of it. Later, Youji and Beelzebub, in his true form, discussed about Kanan, and they both started arguing about whom Kanan likes the most. Kanan heard enough of them, but then both Youji and Beelzebub passed out for staying in the hot springs for far too long. Soon after, Kanan showed Youji an area with so many stars in the sky at night. As they are eating croquettes together, Beelzebub showed up and gives them a final stamp, officially declaring them a couple, though Kanan wanted Youji to try to get her to confess her love for him. In the epilogue, Kanan watched over the students at high school, though she gets embarrassed when Youji showed up and Nadeko wanted to be chastised as well.

== Reception ==
The series was nominated for the ninth Next Manga Awards in 2023 in the print category, and was ranked seventeenth out of 41 nominees.
