= Studio Kai =

Japanese animation studio

Studio Kai, Inc.
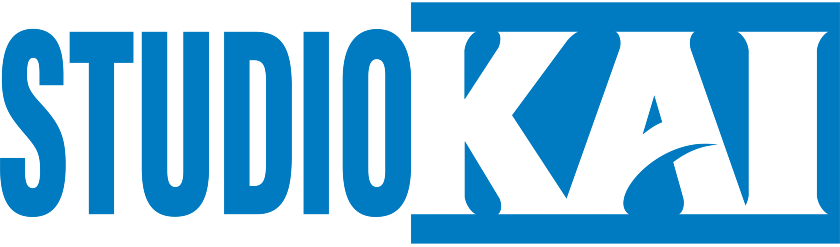
- Logo used since 2024
- Native name: 株式会社スタジオKAI
- Romanized name: Kabushiki-gaisha Sutajio KAI
- Type: Kabushiki gaisha
- Industry: Japanese animation
- Founded: June 2019; 7 years ago
- Headquarters: 5-17-13 Naritahigashi, Suginami, Tokyo, Japan
- Key people: Kenji Ōshiba (president and CEO)
- Total equity: ¥5,000,000
- Owner: ADK Emotions
- Number of employees: 133 (as of the end of December 2025)
- Website: st-kai.jp

Studio Kai, Inc. (Japanese: スタジオKAI, Hepburn: Kabushiki-gaisha Sutajio KAI) is a Japanese animation studio based in Suginami, Tokyo. It was founded by ADK Emotions in June 2019.

== History ==
Studio Kai was founded by ADK Emotions in June 2019. The following month, Gonzo transferred parts of its anime production, intellectual property, and rights management business to the studio. The studio reported 165 million yen loss in 2020.

On April 13, 2026, Studio Kai filed for insolvency after reporting a loss of ¥565 million in 2025.

== Works ==
=== Television series ===
Title	Director(s)	First run start date	Last run end date	Eps	Note(s)	Ref.
Umamusume: Pretty Derby (season 2)	Kei Oikawa	January 5, 2021	March 30, 2021	13	Sequel to Umamusume: Pretty Derby by P.A. Works.	
Super Cub	Toshiro Fujii	April 7, 2021	June 23, 2021	12	Based on a light novel written by Tone Kōken.	
Skeleton Knight in Another World	Katsumi Ono	April 7, 2022	June 23, 2022	12	Based on a light novel written by Ennki Hakari. Co-produced with Hornets.	
The Prince of Tennis II: U-17 World Cup	Keiichiro Kawaguchi	July 7, 2022	September 29, 2022	13	Based on The Prince of Tennis franchise. Co-produced with M.S.C.	
Shine Post	Kei Oikawa	July 13, 2022	October 19, 2022	12	Based on a light novel written by Rakuda, part of a multimedia project.	
Fuuto PI	Yousuke Kabashima	August 1, 2022	October 17, 2022	12	Based on a manga written by Riku Sanjo, related to Kamen Rider W.	
Captain Tsubasa: Junior Youth Arc	Katsumi Ono	October 1, 2023	June 30, 2024	39	Sequel to Captain Tsubasa by David Production.	
Umamusume: Pretty Derby (season 3)	Kei Oikawa	October 5, 2023	December 28, 2023	12	Sequel to Umamusume: Pretty Derby season 2.	
7th Time Loop: The Villainess Enjoys a Carefree Life Married to Her Worst Enemy!	Kazuya Iwata	January 7, 2024	March 24, 2024	12	Based on a light novel written by Touko Amekawa. Co-produced with Hornets.	
Hell Teacher: Jigoku Sensei Nube	Yasuyuki Ōishi	July 2, 2025	March 25, 2026	26	Based on a manga written by Shō Makura.	
A Star Brighter Than the Sun	Sayaka Kobayashi	October 2, 2025	December 18, 2025	12	Based on a manga written by Kazune Kawahara.	
Sentenced to Be a Hero	Hiroyuki Takashima	January 3, 2026	March 26, 2026	12	Based on a light novel written by Rocket Shokai.	
The Ramparts of Ice	Mankyū	April 2, 2026	July 2, 2026	14	Based on a manga written by Kōcha Agasawa.	
Snowball Earth	Munehisa Sakai	April 3, 2026	June 26, 2026	13	Based on a manga written by Yuhiro Tsujitsugu.	
Mistress Kanan Is Devilishly Easy	Yasushi Muroya	April 5, 2026	June 21, 2026	12	Based on a manga written by Nonco.	
The Ramparts of Ice (season 2)	Mankyū	October 1, 2026	TBA	TBA	Sequel to The Ramparts of Ice.	
Mistress Kanan Is Devilishly Easy 2 EASY	Yasushi Muroya	2027	TBA	TBA	Sequel to Mistress Kanan Is Devilishly Easy.	
Hololive: Let's Head Out!	Shunsuke Machiya	TBA	TBA	TBA	Part of the Hololive Production VTuber agency franchise, produced as part of its 10th anniversary celebrations.	

=== Films ===
Title	Director(s)	Release date	Note(s)	Ref.
Fuuto PI: The Portrait of Kamen Rider Skull	Yousuke Kabashima	November 8, 2024	Sequel to Fuuto PI.	

=== Original net animations ===
Title	Director(s)	Release date(s)	Eps	Runtime	Note(s)	Ref.
Cagaster of an Insect Cage	Koichi Chigira	February 6, 2020	12	25–33 minutes	Based on a manga by Kachō Hashimoto. Animation produced by Okinawa Gonzo.	
7 Seeds Part 2	Yukio Takahashi	March 26, 2020	12	24–31 minutes	Sequel to 7 Seeds, based on a manga by Yumi Tamura.	
The Prince of Tennis II: Hyotei vs. Rikkai Game of Future	Keiichiro Kawaguchi	February 13, 2021– April 17, 2021	2	45–47 minutes	Based on The Prince of Tennis franchise. Co-produced with M.S.C.	

=== OVAs ===
- Hori-san to Miyamura-kun (2021, episode 6)
