= Shirakami Fubuki =

Hololive VTuber and singer

- 白上フブキ
- Shirakami Fubuki as designed by Nagishiro Mito
- Occupation: Virtual YouTuber

YouTube information
- Channel: フブキCh。白上フブキ
- Years active: 2018–present
- Subscribers: 2.65 million
- Views: 762.8 million
- Last updated: 16 May 2026
- Website: hololive.hololivepro.com/en/talents/shirakami-fubuki/

Shirakami Fubuki (Japanese: 白上 フブキ, Hepburn: Shirakami Fubuki) is a Japanese virtual YouTuber and singer affiliated with Cover Corporation's Hololive Production agency. She debuted in June 2018 as part of Hololive's Generation 1. She also became part of the Hololive Gamers subgroup since December 2018. Most of her livestreams are let's plays of games, especially tactical role-playing games, with her work also including casual chatting and karaoke. She released her first album, FBKINGDOM: Blessing, in 2025. She has received credit for popularizing several concepts of Hololive, including its Hololive-wide fanbase, international fanbase, and daily streaming schedule.

== Overview ==
Shirakami Fubuki's lore describes her as a "white-haired animal-eared otaku fox" with a cheerful, talkative personality. She is one of the four members of Hololive's Generation 1 subgroup, alongside Aki Rosenthal, Akai Haato, and Natsuiro Matsuri, having been part of it since her debut. She is also simultaneously a member of the Hololive Gamers subgroup since its establishment, counting Ookami Mio, Nekomata Okayu, and Inugami Korone as her genmates. Fubuki's illustrator is Nagishiro Mito.

Shirakami's fandom name is the Sukonbu (すこん部) or Friends. The "Sukonbu" was adopted after fans suggested using her word sukon (すこん) - a portmanteau of the Japanese Internet slang term suko and the fox onomatopoeia kon (こん) - and no other proposals were put forward.

== Career ==
Shirakami Fubuki made her debut on 1 June 2018. When asked why she auditioned, she said, "I'm not good at speaking in front of people, but I wanted friends with whom I could talk about the things I like."

=== Streaming career ===
Shirakami usually streams every day. In her live streams, she mostly plays games; while many of them are tactical role-playing games, she also plays games from other genres Ace Combat 7, Dead by Daylight, Forbidden Siren 2, Fortnite, Mario Kart 8, Minecraft, and Splatoon 2. Her game streams include real-time attack speedrunning Minecraft or ending Mario Kart 8 if she places below 6th place. In December 2018, Shirakami became leader of the newly-formed unit Hololive Gamers.

Hitoshi Sugiyama of Real Sound describes Shirakami as having an "high-caliber all-rounder" image, where her appeal comes not just from her YouTube streams but also her outside activities in places like Twitter. Keirō of MoguraVR notes that despite her "enjoyment-first" attitude, her trademark style is a competitive "play-to-win" attitude where she "celebrates wildly when she wins and expresses genuine frustration when she loses". Shirakami is a fan of Fate/Grand Order, often bringing it up in her streams.

In addition to games, Shirakami does streams related to casual chatting, drawing, karaoke, ASMR, and radio programming. She once set up a hours-long stream called Baba-domo no Neoki o Mimamoru RTA Jikkyō (ババ共の寝起きを見守るRTA実況 lit. "An RTA Commentary: Watching Over the Old Hags as They Wake Up"), after Houshou Marine and Murasaki Shion overslept and could not arrive for their respective streams.

One recurring character in Shirakami's streams, Kurokami Fubuki, is "an acquaintance of Shirakami Fubuki—or rather, something like two souls sharing one body". The character held her first solo live stream in September 2019, and in November 2019 unveiled her 3D model at Congratulations!! Fubuki Birthday Party 2019. Keirō called her "a charming fox-girl character", citing "her beautiful black hair, cool low-pitched voice, and refreshingly blunt manner of speaking".

=== Music career ===
Shirakami's karaoke streams usually feature anime songs and Vocaloid songs, and she often performs J-pop, rock, video game music, and foreign music. In 2019, she collaborated with American YouTuber The8BitDrummer for a "Drumming Challenge" showdown after the latter learned about her Scatman John impressions; this encouraged the engagement with other Hololive VTubers, which "helped introduce the group's unique charm to an international audience".

Shirakami has released several singles, many of which have appeared on the Billboard Japan Download Songs chart. In January 2025, Shirakami released her first album FBKINGDOM: Blessing. She ranked at #58 on Billboard Japan's Artist 100 chart on 22 January 2025. In February 2025, she held her first solo live concert, FBKIngdom: Anthem, at Pia Arena MM.

She also often participates in hololive's music projects as a group. After being grouped with Nakiri Ayame and Ookami Mio for the song "Hyakka Ryoran Hanafubuki" (百花繚乱花吹雪) under the hololive Idol Project, an idol unit called AyaFubuMi (いろはにほへっと あやふぶみ, Irohanihohetto Ayafubumi) was created for the trio based on their common Japanese theme. When performing in groups at live concerts, Shirakami usually does center position.

=== Acting career ===
Shirakami voiced Geats Chemy in the 2023 movie Kamen Rider the Winter Movie: Gotchard & Geats. She also did voice-over work for a Sound Voltex game and the Zoids franchise.

=== Collaborations ===
Shirakami is a native of Hiroshima Prefecture. In October 2026, she collaborated with the theme park Miroku no Sato in Fukuyama, Hiroshima, which was reported to have attracted 1.5 times the anticipated attendance numbers.

== Reception and popularity ==
By October 2019, Shirakami had more than 210,000 subscribers on YouTube; at the time Keirō called her a "leading figure among popular VTubers" due to her subscriber count. Her YouTube channel reached two million in October 2022. Sugiyama said that she "established the archetype for the 'Hololive-style' of daily streaming content", citing her "leadership" in Hololive's streaming activities, and that she popularized the "box fans" concept behind the fandom towards Hololive as a whole. Keirō remarked that Shirakami's "defining characteristic is her sheer versatility and multifaceted appeal", while also calling her voice "cute" and visuals "charming".

Shirakami was the second-most subscribed VTuber on Bilibili in April 2019, and she had 670,000 Bilibili subscribers in October 2019, during which "her popularity in China [was] rapidly approaching that of Kizuna Ai". The Yangtse Evening Post cited her "adorable appearance, personality, and voice" as the cause behind her popularity in China.

In 2018, AWSL, an acronym from the Chinese phrase "A, wǒ sǐle" (啊，我死了, lit. "Ah, I'm dead"), was frequently used on danmu comments on Shirakami's content on Bilibili, leading to its widespread popularity on Chinese videos. According to data the site released in December 2019, there were 3.29 million mentions of the phrase on Bilibili danmu comments, making it the site's most frequently-used buzzword for the year. One comment about her from fellow Hololive VTuber, "Shirakami Fubuki wa kono yo de ichiban kawaii" (白上フブキはこの世で1番かわいい, lit. "Shirakami Fubuki is the cutest in the world"), became a trending Twitter hashtag.

== Discography ==
=== Albums ===
==== As lead artist ====
| Title | Details | Peak chart positions | | | | |
| Title | Details | JPN | JPN Comb. | JPN Dg. | JPN Hot | JPN DL |
|---|---|---|---|---|---|---|
| FBKINGDOM "Blessing" | Released: 15 January 2025; Label: Cover Corp; Formats: Digital download, streaming | 2 | 2 | 1 | 56 | 1 |
"—" denotes releases that did not chart or were not released in that region.

==== As featured artist ====
| Title | Details |
|---|---|
| Shirakami Cafe Music (TOMATO GUMMY feat. Shirakami Fubuki) | Released: 12 August 2019; Label: Tomato Gummy; Formats: CD, digital download, streaming |
| Shirakami FINE!! (TOMATO GUMMY feat. Shirakami Fubuki) | Released: 31 December 2019; Label: Tomato Gummy; Formats: CD, digital download, streaming |

=== Extended plays ===
==== As collaborative artist ====
| Title | Details | Peak chart positions | | |
| Title | Details | JPN Dg. | JPN Hot | JPN DL |
|---|---|---|---|---|
| yamato phantasia (ヤマトファンタジア) (with Nakiri Ayame, Ookami Mio, and Sakura Miko) | Released: 16 July 2023; Label: Cover Corp; Formats: Digital download, streaming | 6 | — | 32 |
| Sleepless Songbook (可惜夜歌集, Atarayo Kashū) (with Nakiri Ayame and Ookami Mio as AyaFubuMi) | Released: 27 July 2023; Label: FAVES; Formats: CD, digital download, streaming | 17 | 54 | 13 |
| Kami-Tsumo Dora Dora Densetsu (神ツモ☆ドラドラ伝説) (with Aki Rosenthal, Houshou Marine, and Ichijou Ririka) | Released: 5 November 2026; Label: hololive RECORDS; Formats: Digital download, streaming | — | — | — |
"—" denotes releases that did not chart or were not released in that region.

=== Singles ===
==== As lead artist ====
| Title | Year | Peak chart positions | | Album |
| Title | Year | JPN Dig. | JPN DL | Album |
|---|---|---|---|---|
| "Say! Fanfare!" (Say!ファンファーレ!) | 2020 | 19 | 12 | FBKINGDOM "Blessing" |
| "Kingworld" (stylized in all-caps) | 2022 | — | 31 | FBKINGDOM "Blessing" |
| "Konkon Beats" (stylized as "KONKON Beats") | 2022 | — | 66 | FBKINGDOM "Blessing" |
| "Hi Fine Fox!" (stylized as "Hi Fine FOX!!") | 2023 | — | 40 | FBKINGDOM "Blessing" |
| "Letter" (stylized as "LETTER☆彡") | 2023 | — | 34 | FBKINGDOM "Blessing" |
| "Brinyan’s Mode ha Pi Pi Pi no Pi (Heart)" (ブリにゃんモードはピピピのピ(ハート)) (stylized as "Brinyan’s Mode ha Pi Pi Pi no Pi ♡") | 2024 | — | 74 | Non-album single |
| "Supernova" (stylized in all-caps) | 2024 | — | 73 | FBKINGDOM "Blessing" |
| "Bokuranoseiza" (僕らの星座) | 2024 | 24 | 26 | FBKINGDOM "Blessing" |
| "Meikai Halloween Night!" (冥界Halloween Night!) | 2025 | — | 58 | Non-album singles |
| "FOXXXROOM" | 2026 | 46 | 47 | Non-album singles |
"—" denotes releases that did not chart or were not released in that region.

==== As featured artist ====
| Title | Year |
|---|---|
| "Gimme Gimmi Virtual Saiko Star!!!!" (Gimme吟味virtuaる最高star!!!!) (sasakure.UK feat. Sakura Miko, Shirakami Fubuki, Natsuiro Matsuri, and Houshou Marine) | 2021 |

==== As AyaFubuMi ====
| Title | Year | Peak chart positions | | Album |
| Title | Year | JPN Dig. | JPN DL | Album |
|---|---|---|---|---|
| "Onikemodance" (おにけもだんす) (stylized in all caps) | 2022 | — | 27 | Sleepless Songbook |
| "Hozukibiyori" (鬼灯日和) | 2022 | 34 | 17 | Sleepless Songbook |
| "Renjo Shiika" (恋情詩歌) | 2022 | — | 27 | Sleepless Songbook |
| "OniOniKonKonWaon" (おにおにこんこんわおん) | 2024 | — | — | Non-album singles |
| "Ame Tokimeki Koimoyo" (雨トキメキ恋模様) | 2025 | — | — | Non-album singles |
| "Irowanioedomo" (色は匂えども) | 2026 | — | — | Non-album singles |
| "Gokuraku Gokigen Enbiyori" (極楽ごきげん縁日和) | 2026 | — | — | Non-album singles |
"—" denotes releases that did not chart or were not released in that region.

==== As Hololive Gamers ====
| Title | Year | Peak chart positions |
| Title | Year | JPN Dig. |
|---|---|---|
| "We are Gamers!!!!" | 2024 | 40 |
| "To Be Continued...." | 2025 | 40 |

==== Other collaborative singles ====
| Title | Year | Peak chart positions | Album |
| Title | Year | JPN DL | Album |
|---|---|---|---|
| "Plasmagic Seasons!" (with Yozora Mel, Natsuiro Matsuri, Aki Rosenthal and Akai Haato as hololive 1st Generation) | 2021 | 55 | Non-album singles |
| "Wakuwaku Everyday" (わくわくエブリデイ) (with Ookami Mio) | 2021 | 56 | Non-album singles |
| "Happiness World" (with Houshou Marine as BABACORN) | 2022 | 49 | Ahoy!! You’re All Pirates♡ |
| "Let's Go↑Bakataration" (進め↑BAKATARATION) (stylized in all-caps; with Shiranui Flare and Tsunomaki Watame as Bakataredomo) | 2022 | 51 | Non-album single |
| "pipapo☆pipipu" (ピパポ☆ピピプ) (with Houshou Marine as BABACORN) | 2024 | — | Ahoy!! You’re All Pirates♡ |
| "Secret Garden" (with Natsuiro Matsuri, Aki Rosenthal and Akai Haato as hololive 1st Generation) | 2024 | — | Non-album singles |
| "Cyber Pure Love Declaration" (電脳ぴゅあ推し大宣言) (with Natsuiro Matsuri, Aki Rosenthal and Akai Haato as hololive 1st Generation) | 2025 | — | Non-album singles |
| "faint sunset" (微かな夕陽) (with Amane Kanata, Sakura Miko, Himemori Luna, Houshou Marine, and Yukihana Lamy as Magical Girl holoWitches!) | 2025 | — | Non-album singles |
| "Necchu Syndrome" (ねっちゅーシンドローム) (with Amane Kanata, Sakura Miko, Himemori Luna, Houshou Marine, and Yukihana Lamy as Magical Girl holoWitches!) | 2025 | — | Non-album singles |
| "Vivid Stampede!!!!" (with Shiranui Flare, Tsunomaki Watame, and Omaru Polka as Bakatare Circus) | 2026 | — | Non-album singles |
| "KemomomomomoMof!" (けもももももも！) (with Nekomata Okayu as NYANGUCORN) | 2026 | — | Non-album singles |
"—" denotes releases that did not chart or were not released in that region.
