= Sakamata Chloe =

Hololive VTuber and singer

- Sakamata Chloe as designed by Parsley
- Occupation: Virtual YouTuber

YouTube information
- Channel: Chloe ch. 沙花叉クロヱ - holoX -
- Years active: 2021–2025
- Website: hololive.hololivepro.com/en/talents/sakamata-chloe/

Sakamata Chloe (Japanese: 沙花叉クロヱ, Hepburn: Sakamata Kuroe) is a Japanese VTuber, singer, and songwriter. A member of HoloX, she was active with Cover Corporation's Hololive Production agency from 2021 until stopping her activities in 2025, though she remains affiliated with Cover.

== Overview ==
Sakamata Chloe's fictional lore describes her as the "fixer and cleaner" for HoloX. Her character designer is Parsley. Her character is reminiscent of the orca. Her fandom name is the Handlers.

== Career ==
=== Early career and streaming career ===
Sakamata made her debut stream on 29 November 2021. She reached one million subscribers on 18 February 2023, celebrating with a commemorative event at Aqua Park Shinagawa.

Sakamata's YouTube streams included Let's Plays. She was particularly skilled in shooting games like Rust; she once finished Green Hell in three days, playing for almost eleven hours in one day; and one stream showed her and Amane Kanata attempt to find an elytra, a rare item in Minecraft. Kai-You said that "her regular streams are full of her charm", and that "she often takes on the role of the straight man" whenever she's in a collaboration with other Hololive VTubers.

One of Sakamata's recurring streams was "Osusume Sakamata" (おすすめさかまた; lit. 'Recommended Sakamata'), where she recommended games that are difficult to stream. Another recurring theme was crowdsourcing, at one time involving tree decorations for her Christmas Day 2022 stream. Her April Fool's Day 2022 plan involved a mock radio show named Matamata Radio, with the debut episode being advertised as the "800th". She also appeared in Amane Kanata's video "Radi-con Interview! Miko ga haitta Kanata ni Sakamata ga Interview!!!", where she interviewed Amane when Sakura Miko voiced her; Tamagomago featured it on MoguraVR's Kono Dōga ga Sugoi! series during the week of 2 June 2023, saying that the video "perfectly showcases the humor of all three".

=== Musical career ===
Sakamata's original songs include "Jinsei Reset Button Pochi" (which she composed and wrote) and "Marionette". Kai-You said that "her passion for music is evident in the fact that she actually creates her own songs". She also did several covers, including Deco*27 song "Chimera". She held her first 1st anniversary concert in November 2022; Kai-You said that "each song is filled with Sakamata Chloe's cuteness and coolness, and including the attention to detail in the dancing and staging, it's a stream that you should definitely watch." She and Kazama Iroha held the virtual reality concert Cinderella Switch: Hololive Singing Together: Vol. 1 on 28 January 2023.

Sakamata joined Hololive's ocean-themed musical group Umisea in August 2022. She was part of the agency's Magical Girl HoloWitches project. A fictional version of Sakamata is featured in the manga holoX MEETing!, and the series first volume is centered on her.

=== Personal life and retirement ===
Following two instances of a mysterious female voice during her 13 July 2022 singing livestream, Sakamata took a brief break from streaming and her 14 July 2022 member-only stream was cancelled. She also stayed at a different home after noticing mysterious sounds and other perceived paranormal activity in both her family home and her new home. In January 2024, she decided to take another streaming hiatus after testing positive for COVID-19.

On 30 November 2024, Cover announced that Sakamata's Hololive activities would cease on 26 January 2025, and that she would remain an affiliate with the agency afterwards. In contrast to graduation, where the VTuber ceases all future activities with their agency, her status provides leeway with allowing future activities to a limited extent, with Cover comparing this to "a graduate coincidentally showing up at their alma mater". She cited health issues from overwork, as well as plans to work outside of Hololive, as reasons for her retirement. She held a farewell concert, viewed over 2.4 million times.

As part of her downgrade to affiliate, she resigned from all Hololive projects she was involved with, including HoloWitches. Her members-only content was removed on 30 April 2025.

== Discography ==
=== Studio albums ===
==== As Secret Society HoloX ====
Title	Album details	Peak chart positions			Sales
Title	Album details	JPN	JPN Comb.	JPN Hot	Sales
Secret Order	Released: 8 April 2026; Label: Cover Corp.; Formats: CD, digital download, streaming	7	10	— (Note: Secret Order did not enter the Billboard Japan Hot Albums chart, but peaked at number 19 on the Download Albums chart.)	JPN: 10,665
"—" denotes releases that did not chart.

=== Singles ===
==== As lead artist ====
Title	Year	Peak chart positions	Album
Title	Year	JPN DL	Album
"Jinsei Reset Button Pochi" (人生リセットボタンぽちーw)	2022	64	Non-album singles
"Marionette" (擬態ごっこ)	2023	24	Non-album singles
"Paralyze" (パラライズ)	2023	70	Non-album singles
"Right Left You You Puppy Dog Eyes Mecho Kawaii!" (右左君君右下上目きゅるんめちょかわ！)	2023	—	Non-album singles
"Moodoku" (モードク)	2024	81	Non-album singles
"Mazaru Nibiiro" (混ざる鈍色)	2025	—	Non-album singles
"—" denotes releases that did not chart or were not released in that region.

==== As featured artist ====
Title	Year	Album
"Love Frustration" (ラブフラストレーション) (original by Dyes Iwasaki)	2024	D.I. SWING

==== As Secret Society HoloX ====
Title	Year	Peak chart positions		Album
Title	Year	JPN Dig.	JPN DL	Album
"Jouya Repaint" (常夜リペイント)	2022	—	52	Secret Order
"Labyrinthine Labyrinth" (迷宮なラビリンス)	2023	—	45	Secret Order
"Kyouen Solidarity~Shake★Nabe~" (饗宴ソリダリティ~SHAKE★NABE~)	2023	—	50	Secret Order
"Cho Yume Dodekkai!" (ちょ〜ゆめドデッカい!)	2024	—	—	Secret Order
"Gyoukou Chronicle" (暁光クロニクル)	2024	48	—	Secret Order
"—" denotes releases that did not chart.
