= Natsuiro Matsuri =

Hololive Japanese VTuber

- 夏色まつり
- Natsuiro Matsuri as designed by Haruki Minamura
- Born: July 22
- Occupation: Virtual YouTuber

YouTube information
- Channel: Matsuri Channel 夏色まつり
- Years active: 2018–present
- Genres: Livestreaming; Singing; Gaming
- Subscribers: 1.57 million
- Views: 266 million
- Last updated: April 8, 2026
- Website: hololive.hololivepro.com/en/talents/natsuiro-matsuri/

Natsuiro Matsuri (夏色 まつり) is a Japanese virtual YouTuber (VTuber) affiliated with Hololive Production. She is part of Hololive (Japan) 1st Generation alongside Akai Haato, Shirakami Fubuki and Aki Rosenthal. Matsuri debuted as a VTuber on June 1, 2018, and has since amassed over 1 million subscribers on YouTube.

== Career ==
From May 2 to 13, 2018, Cover, the management company of Hololive, held a VTuber audition to look for individuals who have experience in live streaming and video uploading and want to challenge themselves as VTubers. The character designs and name of the five open spots that would later debut as Generation 1 were made public at the start of the audition. The design of Natsuiro Matsuri was llustrated by artist Haruki Minamura, and a 3D model by Pompu-chou was created later on.

Natsuiro Matsuri made her Twitter debut on May 31 and streamed her YouTube debut on June 1.

Her livestreams mainly consist of her chatting and playing games. She also sings, sometimes showing this off in her streams. She is from Aichi Prefecture.

On 27 August 2019, she reached 100,000 YouTube subscribers.

Her first original song "Kimi to Nagameru Natsu no Hana" (君と眺める夏の花) was released on 20 June 2020.

In July 2020, it was announced that a Matsuri Nendoroid figure would be produced.

== Appearances outside YouTube ==
=== Drama ===
- Watanukisan chi no (四月一日さん家の) (2020) playing: Wakaki Haru.

=== TV programs ===
※ indicates Internet stream

- bilibili Spring V Festival 赏樱会 (March 22, 2020, bilibili※・Niconico live streaming※)
- NHK Virtual cultural festival (August 14, 2020, NHK General TV)

=== Television animation ===
- The Detective Is Already Dead (2021, Natsuiro Matsuri)

=== Game ===
- Dawn of the Breakers (2019, Natsuiro Matsuri)
- Azur Lane (2019, Natsuiro Matsuri)
- Groove Coaster: Wai Wai Party!!!! (2020, Natsuiro Matsuri) – DLC Character
- Brave Nine – Tactical RPG (2020, Yurisea)

=== Other ===
- VTuber chips 2 (2020) collaboration

== Discography ==
=== Studio album ===
Title	Album details	Peak chart positions			
Title	Album details	JPN	JPN Comb.	JPN Dg.	JPN DL
Chasing the Dream ~After School Spotlight~ (Chasing the Dream 〜スポットライトは放課後に〜)	Released: 25 February 2026; Label: Cover; Format: CD, digital download, streaming	17	38	49	50

=== Singles ===
==== As lead artist ====
Title	Year	Album
"HiHi High Tension!" (HiHiハイテンション！)	2021	Chasing the Dream ~After School Spotlight~
"Never Give Up Natsuiro Story!" (ネバギバ夏色ストーリー)	2022	Chasing the Dream ~After School Spotlight~
"Zettai Monarchy Carnival!" (ゼッタイ王政カーニバル！)	2023	Chasing the Dream ~After School Spotlight~
"Virtualove" (ばーちゃらぶ)	2023	Chasing the Dream ~After School Spotlight~
"Endless Fes"	2024	Chasing the Dream ~After School Spotlight~
"Love Letter" (ラブレター)	2025	Chasing the Dream ~After School Spotlight~
"Holomem Exercise" (ホロメン体操)	2025	Chasing the Dream ~After School Spotlight~
"U-Nyaka" (ウーニャカ)	2025	Chasing the Dream ~After School Spotlight~
"Toushindai Love Letter" (等身大ラブレター)	2026	Chasing the Dream ~After School Spotlight~
"Senshu Sensation" (せんしゅセンセーション)	2026	Non-album single

==== As collaborative artist ====
Title	Year	Label	Album	Note
"Gimme Gimmi Virtual Saiko Star!!!! ("Gimme吟味virtuaる最高star!!!!)	2021	Sasakuration	Non-album single	Song by Sasakure.UK, co-sung with Hololive's Sakura Miko, Shirakami Fubuki and Houshou Marine
"Plasmagic Seasons!"	2021	Cover Corp.	Non-album single	Co-sung with Hololive's Yozora Mel, Shirakami Fubuki, Aki Rosenthal and Akai Haato as Hololive 1st Generation
"Secret Garden"	2024	Cover Corp.	Non-album single	Co-sung with Aki Rosenthal, Akai Haato, and Shirakami Fubuki as Hololive 1st Generation
"Boom"	2024	Cover Corp.	Non-album single	Co-sung with Amamiya Kokoro, Tachibana Hinano, Ars Almal, and Omaru Polka as Team Ahamo
"Cyber Pure Love Declaration" (電脳ぴゅあ推し大宣言)	2025	Cover Corp.	Non-album single	Co-sung with Aki Rosenthal, Akai Haato, and Shirakami Fubuki as Hololive 1st Generation
"KaienSpectacle" (怪宴スペクタクル)	2026	Cover Corp.	Non-album single	Co-sung with Vestia Zeta, Nerissa Ravencroft, Juufuutei Raden, and Todoroki Hajime

=== Songs featured in ===
==== Albums ====
Release date	Album	Song	Note
IMAGINATION vol.3	December 23, 2020	"Kaze Fukeba Koi" (Cover)	
IMAGINATION vol.3	December 23, 2020	"365 Nichi no Kamihikōki" (Cover)	Co-sung with NoriPro's Inuyama Tamaki
IMAGINATION vol.3	December 23, 2020	"Ōgoe Diamond" (Cover)	Co-sung with NoriPro's Inuyama Tamaki and Enomiya Milk, 774 Inc.'s Suou Patora and Souya Ichika, Nijisanji's Suzuka Utako and Suzuhara Lulu, and Hololive's Tsunomaki Watame
