= Todoroki Hajime =

Japanese VTuber

- 轟はじめ
- Todoroki Hajime as designed by Achiki
- Occupation: VTuber

YouTube information
- Channel: Hajime Ch. 轟はじめ ‐ ReGLOSS
- Years active: 2023–present
- Subscribers: 1.25 million
- Views: 551 million
- Last updated: September 5, 2026
- Website: hololivepro.com

Todoroki Hajime (Japanese: 轟はじめ), also known as Bancho (番長), is a Japanese VTuber, singer, and dancer affiliated with Hololive Production. She debuted on September 10, 2023. She is part of the ReGloss unit of Hololive DEV_IS, which performs together as a musical group.

== Career ==
Todoroki Hajime is part of the ReGloss unit of Hololive DEV_IS, alongside Juufuutei Raden, Otonose Kanade, Ichijou Ririka, and formerly Hiodoshi Ao. ReGloss operate together as a musical group. Her model has pink-beige hair and her outfit and shoes are white and light purple. It was designed by Achiki. She has the nickname Bancho (番長), which means boss and delinquent gang leader, and her persona is that of a gang leader. Todoroki made her debut on September 10, 2023. She is from Hokkaido. Prior to joining Hololive Production, she had about six years of dancing experience and had worked as a backup dancer. In livestreams, she often acts as the tsukkomi (straight man). In her livestreams, Todoroki often speaks with a relaxed and inarticulate pronunciation and has made clips referencing her speech's occasional incomprehensibility; in group settings, she often speaks more normally.

On the one year anniversary of her debut, Todoroki released the song "Bancho", which consists of clips of her voice sampled onto a trap beat. The song repeats itself and is 30 minutes long. A music video was released which has Todoroki dancing while in front of various backgrounds. The music was produced by trackmaker Ren, the video was produced by Ray35lem, it was illustrated by Omochi Chowder, and Todoroki said its choreography had been created with help from a dance instructor. She had previously released background music which sampled her voice in November 2023. Todoroki released the footage of her dancing in the video separately and encouraged the creation of memes featuring it, which occurred. The music video reached one million views five days after being released. Yusuke Kobayashi of KAI-YOU compared the song to Fly Project's "Toca-Toca" and Shigure Ui's "Shukusei!! Loli Kami Requiem", which both also saw the creation of memes surrounding their music and choreography.

In September 2024, Todoroki and other members of ReGloss gained 3D models. This allowed her to display her dance abilities, and she frequently releases short videos of her dancing, many of which receive over a million views. Kohiki-an of Dengeki Online observed that her dancing received more attention after receiving the 3D model. An expert on VTubers interviewed by An An observed that she had seen greater success after receiving it. She has performed at concerts with ReGloss as well as other Hololive Production concerts. On January 11, 2025, Todoroki released the single "Countach". (Note: There is disagreement on whether "Countach" or "Bancho" is her first original song.) She choreographed her dance in the single, and Kohiki-an credited her 3D model and the single's visuals, combined with the music, with causing interest in the single among those unfamiliar with her. Todoroki has also worked multiple times with the composer Odamayo, who is known for creating MAD sound with clips from Hololive talents. She also choreographed the song "Utchai" for the TikToker Yuri.

On June 7, 2025 – her character's birthday – Todoroki livestreamed an online concert which peaked at 106,943 concurrent viewers. The concert featured segments with backup dancers, segments where Todoroki did not sing and only danced, and a segment based on Odamayo's videos. It ended with the first performance of her single "Banzai", for which she also created the choreography. Also on June 7, Odamayo released the song "Konkokonkonkonkonkonkon" from a rhythmic knocking noise Todoroki made in a May 2025 livestream of the horror game Night Security. The music video, which also featured illustrations of Todoroki, gained virality. On September 4, Todoroki released a video of her dancing to the song, and on September 5 she released a video of her dancing to the song as a chibi character. She choreographed a dance that was set to the song and used in both videos, and the dance gained virality. In November 2025, "Konkokonkonkonkonkonkon" was featured on the TBS show Love It!. Within three months, her video had surpassed ten million views. It was compared to Juufuutei's "Maitake Dance", a similar dance to a similar tune which also gained virality and was also featured on Love It!.

On August 6, 2025, Todoroki reached one million subscribers on YouTube, the second member of ReGloss after Juufuutei to do so. Her original song, "Birilla Birilla", was released on August 24. Odamayo also produced Todoroki's original song "Chachamonya", which was released on September 11, 2025. Another concert was held on June 7, 2026, and the single "Deep Dive" was also released. The single's popularity increased after Todoroki and Lee Chae-yeon released a video dancing to it on TikTok.

In June 2025, Todoroki and Juufuutei collaborated with the insect repellent brand Earth Pharmaceutical. In March 2026, Todoroki appeared with VTubers Ponpoko and Peanuts-kun in a promotion for the film Hoppers hosted by Evers. In April 2026, Todoroki released a bacon potato pie version of "Konkokonkonkonkonkonkon" in collaboration with McDonald's Japan.

== Discography ==
=== Singles ===
==== As lead artist ====
Title	Year	Peak chart positions		Album
Title	Year	JPN Dig.	JPN DL	Album
"Bancho"	2024	—	—	Non-album singles
"Countach"	2025	—	98	Non-album singles
"Banzai"	2025	—	—	Non-album singles
"Birilla Birilla" (ビリラビリラ)	2025	—	94	Snapshot
"Chachamonya"	2025	—	—	Non-album singles
"Dunk"	2026	—	—	Non-album singles
"Deep Dive"	2026	24	23	Non-album singles
"Worth It" (with Juufuutei Raden)	2026	—	84	TBA
"Go Wild"	2026	—	77	Non-album singles
"—" denotes releases that did not chart.

==== As collaborative artist ====
Title	Year	Ref.
"KaienSpectacle" (怪宴スペクタクル) (with Natsuiro Matsuri, Vestia Zeta, Nerissa Ravencroft, and Juufuutei Raden)	2026	
