= Was It Worth It? (Children of Bodom song) =

"Was It Worth It?..."

Single by Children of Bodom

from the album Relentless Reckless Forever
- Released: 23 February 2011
- Recorded: 2010
- Genre: Melodic death metal
- Length: 4:03
- Label: Spinefarm
- Songwriter: Alexi Laiho
- Producer: Matt Hyde

Children of Bodom singles chronology
"Lookin' Out My Back Door" (2008)	"Was It Worth It?..." (2011)	"Roundtrip to Hell and Back" (2011)

"Was It Worth It?" is the first single from Children of Bodom's seventh studio album, Relentless Reckless Forever.

== Background ==
A music video has been shot for the single with skateboarder Chris Cole as well as noted pro skaters, Jamie Thomas, Garrett Hill, and Tom Asta.

"The single 'Was It Worth It?' is a total party song, said Laiho. "It's not your typical Bodom sound, but it's one of my favorites and heavy as hell."

The video was shot in Pennsylvania's residential Action Sports compound Camp Woodward and it was directed by Dale Resteghini for Raging Nation Films.

The song was made available for streaming on 13 January 2011 via Facebook. It was also released as downloadable content on Guitar Hero: Warriors of Rock on 8 February 2011.

== Track listing ==
No.	Title	Length
1.	"Was It Worth It?"	4:03
2.	"Angels Don't Kill" (Live at Bloodstock)
