= Shirogane Noel =

Hololive VTuber and singer

- 白銀 ノエル
- Shirogane in 2019
- Occupations: Virtual YouTuber; singer

YouTube information
- Channel: Noel Ch. 白銀ノエル
- Years active: 2019–present
- Subscribers: 2.05 million
- Views: 469 million
- Last updated: 10 October 2026

Shirogane Noel (Japanese: 白銀 ノエル, Hepburn: Shirogane Noeru) is a Japanese virtual YouTuber and singer affiliated with Cover Corporation's Hololive Production agency. She debuted in August 2019 as part of Hololive's 3rd Generation. Her streams include video games and ASMR content, and several of her collaborations are related to the beef dish gyūdon, of which she is fond of, and her native Ōita Prefecture. She has also engaged in humanitarian work, donating to recovery efforts for the 2020 Kyushu floods and a November 2025 fire in Ōita city.

== Overview ==
Shirogane Noel's lore describes her as a strength-minded knight who joins the VTuber industry to find the strong people there. Her character designer is Watao.

Shirogane is a member of Hololive 3rd Generation alongside Usada Pekora, Shiranui Flare, and Houshou Marine. Her fan name is the "Knight's Order of Shirogane" (白銀聖騎士団).

== Career ==
Her design was announced on 13 June 2019, albeit without a name. Her debut stream premiered on 8 August 2019.

In 2024, Shirogane increased her streaming activities, at one point spending 16 hours streaming. On 17 February 2025, she hosted an endurance stream to commemorate a planned milestone of two million YouTube subscribers, paying several several songs from herself and other Hololive talents, as well as Uverworld's "Shaka Beach: Laka Laka La". She reached the milestone the next day.

=== Streaming career ===
Shirogane streams several games, with examples being Ark: Survival Evolved, Grand Theft Auto Online, and Minecraft, and Yakuza Kiwami. She also holds singing streams, with Yun-Kiu Lo noting that her songs are selected "to reflect her persona as a girl who loves watching shōnen ("boys'") and mecha (giant robot) anime". Another regular stream is the morning weekly chat "Sunday Muscle" (さんでーまっする). A study by Manting Chen and Rocco Juanlei Hu cited her as an example of invoking moe reactions by deviating from the mainstream kawaii, contrasting one moment showing her declare she ate two large beef rice bowls against her petite, slender appearance. Lo also calls her an example of the new form of "virtual corporeality" which "relies on humanizing functions provided by efficacious sonic and musical performances, where they are living in the virtual.

Another major type of stream is ASMR, with several involving lullabies and shampoo, as well as videos themed after Children's Day, Christmas, setsubun, and Valentine's Day. in September 2025, one of these streams, hosted on VRChat, were made members-only due to its sexual content.

Shirogane is known for having a fondness for gyūdon, a Japanese rice dish with beef and onion, and was known to support projects related to the dish. In December 2020, she collaborated with Nissin Foods to promote the Cup Noodle Mystery Meat Gyudon product, in the process holding a three-part stream with ASMR content. One of her figures, released in 2023, features a gyūdon bowl as an optional bonus piece. From January to April 2026, she held a collaboration campaign with gyūdon restaurant chain Yoshinoya.

=== Singing career ===
In September 2021, Shirogane released her first original single, "Homenobi". Three of her songs appeared on the Billboard Japan Top Download Songs chart. In November 2023, she released Noesanpo, an album featuring her first four singles; it charted at #67 on Billboard Japan Hot Albums and #18 on Billboard Japan Download Albums.

In December 2025, Shirogane released "Vavava! Virtual Ooita", a song about her native Ōita Prefecture and written by Kenmochi Hidefumi.

=== Collaborations ===
In April 2022, Meiri Shurui launched a gin variety in collaboration with Shirogane, "Noel's Potion" (ノエルのポーション); It won a bronze medal at the Tokyo Whisky & Spirits Competition 2023 (TWSC). In June 2022, she and Hitoyoshi, Kumamoto shōchū brewer Yamatoichi Shuzomoto launched a limited-edition product named Gyūnyū Shōchū: Makiba no Yume (牛乳焼酎 牧場の夢), with some proceeds to go to recovery efforts from the 2020 Kyushu floods. In March 2024, she and Meiri Shurui launched another cocktail, Noel's Gin Tonic (stylized in all-caps), made from kabosu from Ōita Prefecture.

Shirogane has also been involved with the community of her native Ōita Prefecture. She donated a stream's entire Super Chat earnings to recovery efforts for a November 2025 fire in the Ōita neighbourhood of Saganoseki. In October 2026, she appeared at the 140th-anniversary celebration of the Oita Godo Shimbun. In June 2026, Oita Bus served a bus wrapped with illustrations of her; it travelled eastward in Ōita city. Concurrently, the Oita Hovercraft service between Ōita city and Oita Airport featured her in videos on board. In July 2026, she posted a video in collaboration with the prefecture government, depicting several landmarks (including Jufu Flower Park and Yufugawa Gorge) and local cuisine, featuring herself rapping with governor Kiichiro Satō.

Shirogane voiced Vanessa, a boss character in the 2022 video game Little Witch Nobeta. Weekly Young Jump featured her in a one-shot manga collaboration, Shirogane Noel Daisuki Ojisan (白銀ノエル大好きおじさん, lit. "Shirogane Noel-Loving Old Man") by Forbidden Shibukawa, published on their 2 March 2023 issue.

== Personal life ==
Shirogane grew up in Ōita Prefecture, and often uses Ōita dialect in her streams. She moved to Tokyo in the same year she joined Hololive.

== Discography ==
=== Albums ===
Title	Album details	Peak chart positions		
Title	Album details	JPN Dg.	JPN Hot	JPN DL
Noesanpo (のえさんぽ)	Released: 25 November 2023; Label: Cover Corp	13	67	18
"—" denotes releases that did not chart or were not released in that region.

=== Singles ===
Title	Year	Peak chart positions		Album
Title	Year	JPN Dig.	JPN DL	Album
"Homenobi" (ほめのび)	2021	49	41	Noesanpo
"Lyrical Monster" (リリカルMonster)	2022	—	39	Noesanpo
"Ours" (stylized in low-caps)	2022	—	71	Noesanpo
"Happy" (はっぴー)	2022	—	—	Noesanpo
"Trevian Knight" (トレビアンナイト)	2025	—	—	Non-album singles
"Vavava! Virtual Ooita" (VAVAVA!バーチャル大分)	2025	—	—	Non-album singles
"Kagami Yo Kagami" (カガミヨカガミ)	2026	—	—	Non-album singles
