= Billboard Japan and Oricon download charts =

Japanese record charts

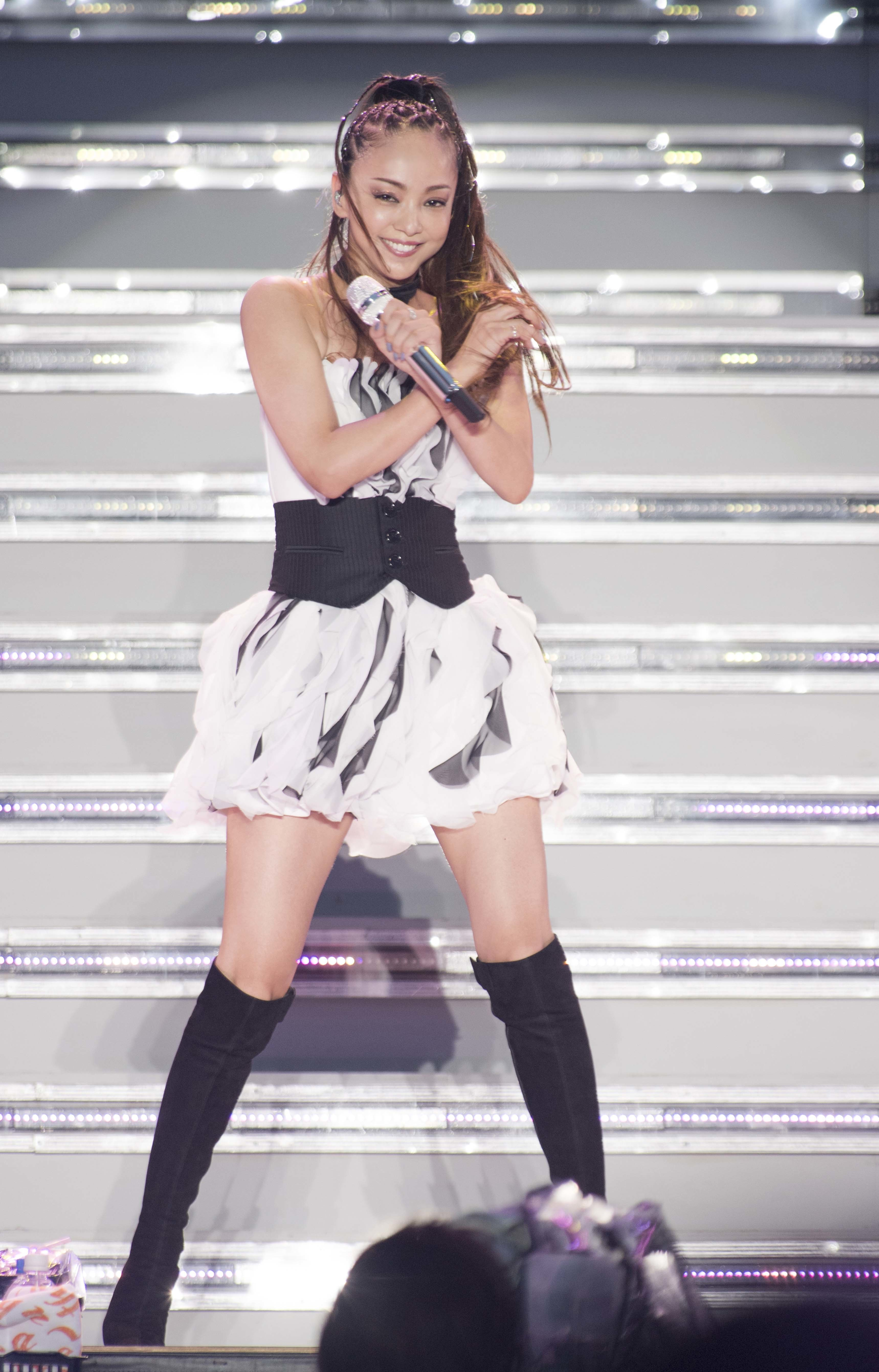
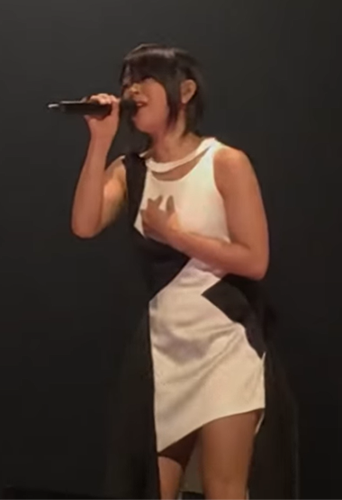
"Hero" by Namie Amuro (left) topped the first Billboard Japan Download Songs in October 2017, whereas "Anata" by Hikaru Utada (right) topped the first Oricon Digital Singles chart in December 2017.

In Japan, record charts for paid download songs and albums are published separately by competitors Billboard Japan and Oricon. Although Billboard Japan has factored downloads since 2010, Oricon were the first to launch a download-only chart in November 2016, with the Digital Albums Chart; (Note: Orikon Dejitaru Arubamu Rankingu (Japanese: オリコンデジタルアルバムランキング)) a year later, they opened the accompanying Digital Singles (Single Track) Chart. (Note: Dejitaru Shinguru (Tankyoku) Rankingu (Japanese: デジタルシングル (単曲) ランキング)) Also that year, Billboard Japan launched the Top Download Songs and Top Download Albums charts simultaneously. Both publications share several parts of their methodology, and the year-end number ones have been the same for both since their inceptions.

== Background ==
Unlike other markets, physical music formats in Japan have remained dominant over digital distribution, even into the 21st century. In 2022, physical media accounted for 11% of music industry revenue in the United States; in contrast, it made up 66% in Japan.

Although physical media was still dominant, digital figures in Japan were gradually growing. While subscription-based streaming services such as Spotify struggled to pick up like it had elsewhere, the digital download format chaku-uta (ringtones, either a shortened or full-length version of a song) gained traction. The boy band Greeeen, who primarily marketed themselves via chaku-uta, achieved over one million downloads with "Ai Uta" (2007), but only reached number 24 on Oricon's CD-only Singles Chart. The Recording Industry Association of Japan (RIAJ) began tracking digital downloads in August 2005.

Chaku-uta went out of relevance in the 2010s, but the song rankings from digital download services still differed from the CD record charts. The top four positions on Oricon's 2017 year-end chart were occupied by the girl idol group AKB48, whereas the ranking of the download service RecoChoku featured Gen Hoshino's "Koi" and Mr. Children's "Hanabi" in top positions. The physical sales of groups such as AKB48 were swayed by the inclusion of goods, such as concert tickets, with CDs. Journalist Sōichirō Matsutani, writing for Bunshun Online, believed that this sales tactic resulted in Oricon's CD-only charts failing to accurately portray which songs were actually receiving the most listens.

== History ==
=== Billboard Japan ===
Billboard Japan introduced download numbers from iTunes into the Japan Hot 100 chart at the end of 2010. In February 2016, they introduced further download services by partnering with GfK Japan, who Musicman reported would provide data for 80% of the download market share. Billboard Japan launched dedicated sub-charts for digital download songs and albums – the Top Download Songs and Albums charts – on October 4, 2017, alongside the Top Streaming Songs chart. Namie Amuro's "Hero" was the inaugural number-one on the download songs chart, and Ariana Grande's The Best was the inaugural number-one album.

=== Oricon ===
Even with the growing popularity of download services, Oricon continued to exclusively publish their CD-only charts. Circa 2008, there was discussion within the company to launch a chaku-uta chart, but such meetings were unfruitful. Oricon CEO Sōkō Koike blamed their lack of a secondary data provider independent from record labels. Later in 2015, Koike reiterated that they would not introduce downloads into their single chart. He believed that a chart factoring downloads would lack social relevance when artists such as Johnny & Associates groups have policies to not release songs digitally, but said that they would continue to experiment.

On November 9, 2016, Oricon launched the Digital Albums Chart, based upon four download services. The inaugural number-one was Fantôme by Hikaru Utada. A year later, they launched the Digital Singles Chart on December 19, 2017, with "Anata", also by Utada, as the first number-one.

== Methodology and differences ==
Oricon's digital charts are published weekly and rank the top 50 records in Japan; the Digital Songs Chart also has a daily issue, which ranks the top 20 releases. The Billboard Japan charts are published weekly and rank the top 100 records.

Billboard Japan receives data from Gfk Media and NielsenIQ for five download providers – Amazon, iTunes, Mora, Mu-Mo, and RecoChoku – whereas Oricon independently collects from seven: those used by Billboard, in addition to OriMusic (their own store) and Music.jp. (Note: Oricon also lists D-Music, Music Store, and Murket, which are owned by RecoChoku. Murket includes the online stores for 13 artists and labels.) Since collecting download numbers requires permission from the record label, Billboard Japan calculates an estimate based upon iTunes numbers for labels and artists they are not partnered with, collected by the Los Angeles-based Luminate. At the time of the Digital Albums Chart's establishment, Oricon were in agreement with 35 labels to collect download data.

== Year-end number ones ==
Key
†	Highest download count across all years

=== Songs ===
List of year-end number ones on the Oricon and Billboard Japan download songs charts, with artist and number of downloads
Year	Song	Artist	Downloads (Note: Taken from Oricon)	Ref.
2017 (Note: Only published by Billboard Japan)	"Koi"	Gen Hoshino	Not reported	
2018	"Lemon"	Kenshi Yonezu	1,796,953 †	
2019	"Lemon"	Kenshi Yonezu	1,074,530	
2020	"Gurenge"	Lisa	942,691	
2021	"Dry Flower"	Yuuri	461,154	
2022	"Zankyōsanka"	Aimer	408,183	
2023	"Idol"	Yoasobi	557,295	
2024	"Bling-Bang-Bang-Born"	Creepy Nuts	373,980	
2025	"Plazma"	Kenshi Yonezu	184,107	

=== Albums ===
List of year-end number ones on the Oricon and Billboard Japan download albums charts, with artist and number of downloads
Year	Song	Artist	Downloads	Ref.
2017	Mr.Children 1992–2002 Thanksgiving 25	Mr. Children	172,631	
2018	The Greatest Showman	Various artists	113,097	
2019	Pop Virus	Gen Hoshino	73,502	
2020	Stray Sheep	Kenshi Yonezu	197,583 †	
2021	The Book	Yoasobi	100,656	
2022	Uta's Songs: One Piece Film Red	Ado	108,337	
2023	Kessoku Band	Kessoku Band	70,132	
2024	No. O: Ring	Number_i	39,364	
2025	10	Mrs. Green Apple	46,103	
