= Bea Arthur =

American actress and comedian (1922–2009)

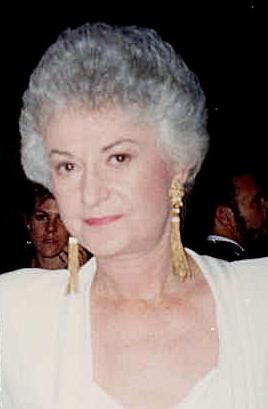
- Arthur in 1987
- Born: Bernice Frankel; May 13, 1922; New York City, U.S.
- Died: April 25, 2009 (aged 86); Los Angeles, California, U.S.
- Other name: Beatrice Arthur
- Education: Franklin School of Science and Arts; The New School
- Occupations: Actress; comedian; singer
- Years active: 1947–2009
- Spouses: Robert Alan Aurthur (m. 1944; div. 1947) Gene Saks (m. 1950; div. 1978)
- Children: 2
- Military service
- Allegiance: United States
- Branch: United States Marine Corps
- Service years: 1943–1945
- Rank: Staff sergeant
- Unit: Marine Corps Women's Reserve

Beatrice Arthur (born Bernice Frankel; May 13, 1922 – April 25, 2009) was an American actress, comedian, and singer. She began her career on stage in 1947, attracting critical acclaim before achieving worldwide recognition for her work on television beginning in the 1970s as Maude Findlay in the popular sitcoms All in the Family (1971–1972) and Maude (1972–1978) and later in the 1980s and 1990s as Dorothy Zbornak on The Golden Girls (1985–1992).

Arthur won several accolades throughout her career, beginning with the 1966 Tony Award for Best Featured Actress in a Musical for playing Vera Charles in Mame. She won Emmy Awards for Outstanding Lead Actress in a Comedy Series in 1977 for Maude and 1988 for The Golden Girls. Arthur has received the third most nominations for the Primetime Emmy Award for Outstanding Lead Actress in a Comedy Series with nine; after Julia Louis-Dreyfus (12) and Mary Tyler Moore (10). Arthur was inducted into the academy's Television Hall of Fame in 2008.

Arthur's film appearances include Lovers and Other Strangers (1970) and the film version of Mame (1974). In 2002, she starred in the one-woman show Bea Arthur on Broadway: Just Between Friends. An obituary described Arthur as "the tall, deep-voiced actress whose razor-sharp delivery of comedy lines made her a TV star."

== Early life, family, education and military service ==
Bernice Frankel was born on May 13, 1922, in the Brooklyn borough of New York City, to Rebecca (née Pressner, born in Austria) and Philip Frankel (born in Poland). Arthur was raised in a Jewish home with her older sister Gertrude and younger sister Marian (1926–2014).

In 1933, the Frankel family relocated to Cambridge, Maryland, where her parents subsequently operated a women's clothing shop. At age 16, Bernice developed a serious condition, coagulopathy, in which her blood would not clot. Concerned for her health, her parents sent her to Linden Hall, an all-girls' boarding school in Lititz, Pennsylvania, for her final two years of high school. Afterwards, she studied for a year at Blackstone College for Girls in Blackstone, Virginia.

During World War II, Frankel enlisted as one of the first members of the United States Marine Corps Women's Reserve in 1943. After boot camp, she served as a typist at Marine headquarters in Washington, D.C. In June 1943, the Marine Corps accepted her transfer request to the Motor Transport School at Camp Lejeune, North Carolina. Frankel then worked as a truck driver and dispatcher in Cherry Point, North Carolina, between 1944 and 1945. She was honorably discharged at the rank of staff sergeant in September 1945.

After serving in the Marines, Frankel studied for a year at the Franklin School of Science and Arts in Philadelphia, where she became a licensed laboratory medical technician. After interning at a local hospital for the summer, she decided against working as a lab technician, departing for New York City in 1947 to enroll in the School of Drama at The New School. She would also study under Lee Strasberg.

== Career ==
=== Theater ===
From 1947, Arthur studied at the Dramatic Workshop of The New School in New York City with German director Erwin Piscator.

Arthur began her acting career as a member of an off-Broadway theater group at the Cherry Lane Theatre in New York City in the late 1940s. Onstage, her roles included Lucy Brown in the 1954 Off-Broadway premiere of Marc Blitzstein's English-language adaptation of Kurt Weill's The Threepenny Opera; Nadine Fesser in the 1957 premiere of Herman Wouk's Nature's Way at the Coronet Theatre; and originating the role of Yente the Matchmaker in the 1964 premiere of Fiddler on the Roof on Broadway.

In 1966, Arthur auditioned for the title role in the musical Mame, which her husband Gene Saks was set to direct, but Angela Lansbury (who would become a good friend of Arthur's) won the role instead. Arthur accepted the supporting role of Vera Charles, for which she won great acclaim, winning a Tony Award for Best Featured Actress in a Musical the same year. She reprised the role in the 1974 film version opposite Lucille Ball. In 1981, she appeared on stage in Woody Allen's The Floating Light Bulb.

Arthur made her debut at the Metropolitan Opera in 1994 portraying the Duchess of Krakenthorp in Gaetano Donizetti's La fille du régiment. In 1995, she starred opposite Renée Taylor and Joseph Bologna in Bermuda Avenue Triangle in Los Angeles.

=== Television ===
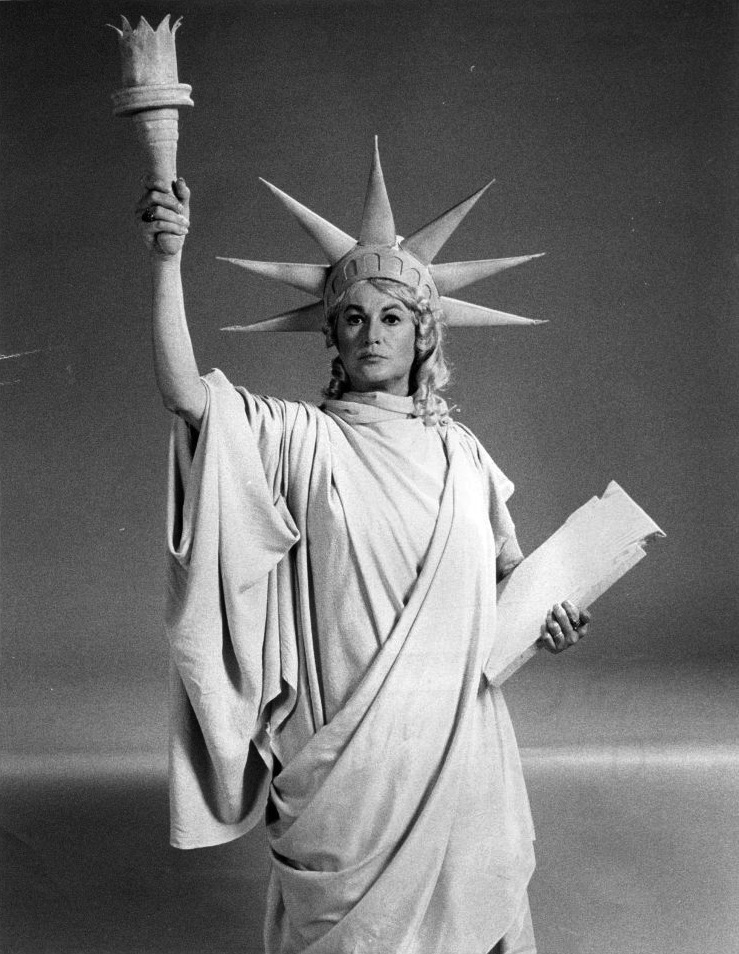
Arthur as Maude Findlay, c. 1973

Arthur accepted a 1971 invitation from Norman Lear to guest-star on his sitcom All in the Family, as Maude Findlay, the cousin of Edith Bunker. An outspoken liberal feminist, Maude was considered the antithesis to the reactionary character of Archie Bunker, who described her as a "New Deal fanatic". At the age of 49, Arthur's performance on All in the Family impressed viewers as well as television executives at CBS who, she would later recall, asked "'Who is that girl? Let's give her her own series.'"

Maude previewed in her second All in the Family appearance. Debuting in 1972, the series found her living in the affluent community of Tuckahoe, Westchester County, New York, with her fourth husband, Walter (Bill Macy) and divorced daughter, Carol (Adrienne Barbeau). Arthur's performance as Maude garnered her several Emmy and Golden Globe nominations for the series, with Arthur winning an Emmy in 1977 for Outstanding Lead Actress in a Comedy Series. Maude earned a place for Arthur in the history of the women's liberation movement.

The series addressed serious sociopolitical topics of the era that were considered taboo for a television sitcom, including the Vietnam War, the Nixon Administration, Maude's bid for a Congressional seat, divorce, menopause, drug use, alcoholism, nervous breakdown, mental illness, women's lib, gay rights, abortion and spousal abuse. A prime example is "Maude's Dilemma", a two-part episode airing near Thanksgiving 1972 in which Maude grapples with a late-life pregnancy, ultimately deciding to have an abortion. Even though abortion had been legal in New York state since 1970, as well as in California since its state's 1969 on-demand ruling, it was illegal in many other regions of the country and, as such, the episode sparked controversy. As a result, dozens of network affiliates refused to broadcast the episode, substituting either a repeat from earlier in the season or a Thanksgiving TV special in its place.

However, by the time of the summer rerun season six months later, the uproar was reduced and the stations that had refused to air the episode upon its first run now ran it for broadcast. A reported 65 million viewers watched the two-episode arc either on first run that November or during the following summer. The episode first aired two months before the U.S. Supreme Court legalized the procedure nationwide in the Roe v. Wade outcome in January 1973.

Arthur decided to exit the series during its sixth season. Later in 1978, she appeared in the Star Wars Holiday Special, in which she performed a song in the Mos Eisley cantina. She hosted The Beatrice Arthur Special for CBS on January 19, 1980, leading a musical comedy revue with Rock Hudson, Melba Moore and Wayland Flowers with Madame.

Arthur returned to television in the short-lived 1983 sitcom Amanda's (an adaptation of the British series Fawlty Towers). Ten of the show's thirteen episodes were aired.

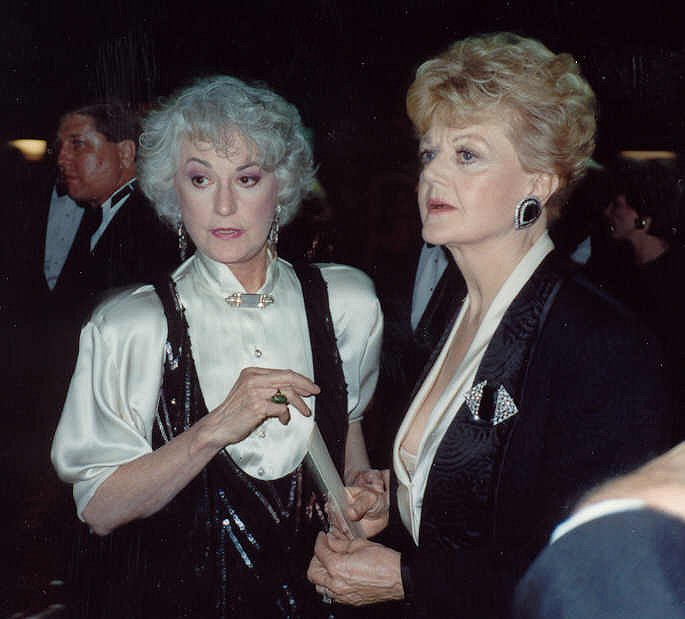
Arthur (left) at the 1989 Emmy Awards with close friend Angela Lansbury (right)

In 1985, Arthur was cast in The Golden Girls, in which she played Dorothy Zbornak, a divorced mother and substitute teacher living in a Miami, Florida, house owned by widow Blanche Devereaux (Rue McClanahan, who had previously co-starred with Arthur in Maude). Her other roommates included widow Rose Nylund (Betty White) and Dorothy's Sicilian mother, Sophia Petrillo (Estelle Getty).

Arthur noted that “if you made [Maude] Jewish... her courage in fighting bigotry would be personal instead of ideological,” but said of Dorothy: “I’m not playing a role. I’m being myself, whatever the hell that is.” She and Getty wanted their characters to be Jewish. Creator Susan Harris's original premise centered on the "age-old trend of Jews retiring to South Florida... [but] "one of the few notes we got back was that it couldn't be four Jewish women in the South, in Miami."

The series was a massive hit and remained a top-ten rating fixture for six of its seven seasons. Arthur's performances led to several Emmy nominations over the course of the series and Arthur won an Emmy in 1988. Arthur left the show after the end of the seventh season and the series ended. In 1992, it was retooled as The Golden Palace with the other three actresses and aired on CBS as it was not picked up by NBC. The new series, however, lasted only one season.

In 1984, Arthur, who routinely declined commercial endorsements, accepted a lucrative offer from Canadian drugstore chain Shoppers Drug Mart to be their commercial spokeswoman, on the condition that the commercials would not air in the United States. Arthur spent seven years in the position, continuing as spokeswoman during her run on The Golden Girls by commuting to Toronto for commercial tapings.

=== Film ===
Arthur reprised her stage role as Vera Charles in the 1974 film adaption of Mame, opposite Lucille Ball. She portrayed overbearing mother Bea Vecchio in Lovers and Other Strangers (1970) and had a cameo as a Roman unemployment clerk in Mel Brooks' History of the World, Part I (1981). She appeared in the 1995 American movie For Better or Worse as Beverly Makeshift. Her final film credit was in Enemies of Laughter in 2000, opposite Peter Falk.

=== Later career ===
After Arthur left The Golden Girls, she made guest appearances on television shows and organized and toured in her one-woman show, alternately titled An Evening with Bea Arthur as well as And Then There's Bea. She made a guest appearance on the American cartoon Futurama, in the Emmy-nominated 2001 episode "Amazon Women in the Mood", as the voice of the feminist "Femputer" who ruled a race of giant Amazonian women. She appeared in a first-season episode of Malcolm in the Middle as Mrs. White, one of Dewey's babysitters who was a strict disciplinarian. She was nominated for an Emmy for Outstanding Guest Actress in a Comedy Series for her performance. She appeared as Larry David's mother on Curb Your Enthusiasm.

In 2002, she returned to Broadway, starring in Bea Arthur on Broadway: Just Between Friends, a collection of stories and songs (with musician Billy Goldenberg) based on her life and career. The show was nominated for a Tony Award for Best Special Theatrical Event.

In addition to appearing in programs looking back at her own work, Arthur performed in stage and television tributes for Jerry Herman, Bob Hope, Ellen DeGeneres. In 2004, she appeared in Richard Barone's "There'll Be Another Spring: A Tribute to Miss Peggy Lee" at the Hollywood Bowl, performing "Johnny Guitar" and "The Shining Sea". In 2005, she participated in the Comedy Central roast of Pamela Anderson, where she recited sexually explicit passages from Anderson's book Star Struck in a deadpan fashion.

== Influences ==
In 1999, Arthur told an interviewer of the three influences in her career: "Sid Caesar taught me the outrageous; [method acting guru] Lee Strasberg taught me what I call reality; and [original Threepenny Opera star] Lotte Lenya, whom I adored, taught me economy." Another source of influence to Arthur was that of famed actress/director Ida Lupino, whom Arthur praised: "My dream was to become a very small blonde movie star like Ida Lupino and those other women I saw up there on the screen during the Depression."

== Personal life ==
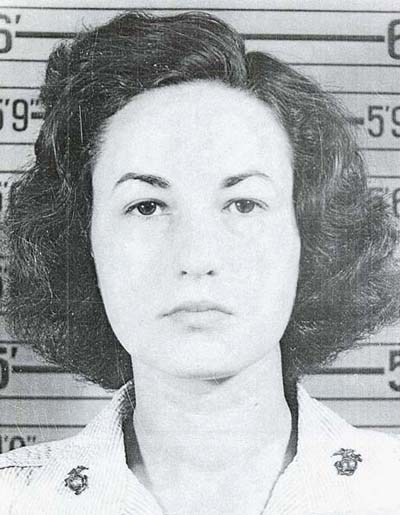
1943 United States Marine Corps identification card photo

Arthur was married twice. Her first marriage took place in 1944, during her time in the military when she wed fellow Marine Robert Alan Aurthur, later a screenwriter, television and film producer and director. They divorced three years later, but she kept his surname, with the spelling adjusted to Arthur. In 1950, she married director Gene Saks with whom she adopted two sons, Matthew, an actor and Daniel, a set designer. She and Saks remained married until 1978.

In 1972, she moved to Los Angeles and sublet her apartment on Central Park West in New York City and her country home in Bedford, New York. In a 2003 interview, while in London promoting her one-woman show, she described the English capital as her "favorite city in the world".

Arthur was a longtime champion of equal rights for women and an active advocate of the elderly and Jewish communities in both her major television roles and through her charity work and personal outspokenness. Contrary to the character she played as Maude, she was originally skeptical of the women's rights movement. Following her divorce from Gene Saks, she later adopted the language of that movement.

Considered a longtime gay icon, she embraced the gay community that had supported her since the 1970s. Late in life, Arthur took up the cause of LGBTQ+ youth homelessness. She raised $40,000 for the Ali Forney Center with one of her final live performances, a revival of her one-woman Broadway show in 2005 after she had fallen ill with cancer. She would go on to advocate for the center until her death, telling Next Magazine, "These kids at the Ali Forney Center are literally dumped by their families because they are lesbian, gay or transgender — this organization really is saving lives."

She was a lifelong Democrat who confirmed this by saying, "I've been a Democrat my whole life. That's what makes Maude and Dorothy so believable, we have the same viewpoints on how our country should be handled."

Arthur was a private and introverted woman, according to her friends. She was a particularly close mentor and friend to Adrienne Barbeau, who co-starred with her on Maude for six seasons. Barbeau was unavailable to perform regularly on the sitcom during its last season due to her schedule; nevertheless, the two remained close and stayed in touch for the rest of Arthur's life. In a 2018 interview with the American website Dread Central, Barbeau shared some of her feelings about her friend:

I was doing an interview for this one-woman show that I am doing and the interviewer asked, "What do people usually ask you," and I said, "They always want to know what it was like working with Bea. She was fantastic and, you know, I realized years later how much I took it for granted because it was my first experience on television. I just assumed that everyone was as giving as she was, as professional as she was, that everyone who was doing a TV show showed up knowing their lines and showed up on time and was willing to say to the writers, "I think this line was funnier if Adie had said it or Conrad had said it or Bill had said it." I mean, she was just the best, she was the best, very funny. She was not Maude when she wasn't saying those lines. I don't know if I'd say she was quiet. She was a homebody. She had her sons, her dog, and her cooking and she wasn't into the celebrity scene and she was a great lady. I loved her dearly and we had a great cast and they were my family for six years. I loved each of them and all of them and it was the best experience anyone could've had, being introduced to television like that.

== Death and legacy ==
Arthur was a heavy smoker and died from lung cancer complications at her home in Los Angeles on April 25, 2009, aged 86. She was cremated and her ashes were scattered at sea.

On April 28, 2009, the Broadway community paid tribute to Arthur by dimming the marquees of New York City's Broadway theater district in her memory for one minute at 8:00 p.m. On September 16, 2009, a public tribute to Arthur was held at the Majestic Theatre in Manhattan, where friends and colleagues including Angela Lansbury, Norman Lear, Rosie O'Donnell and Rue McClanahan paid tribute to the actress.

Arthur's surviving co-stars from The Golden Girls, McClanahan and White, commented on her death via telephone on an April 27 episode of Larry King Live. On the Today Show by phone, McClanahan said she and Arthur got along together "like cream." White said, "I knew it would hurt, I just didn't know it would hurt this much."

Longtime friends Adrienne Barbeau (with whom she had worked on Maude) and Angela Lansbury (with whom she had worked in Mame) reflected on her death. Barbeau said, "We've lost a unique, incredible talent. No one could deliver a line or hold a take like Bea and no one was more generous or giving to her fellow performers." Lansbury said, "She became and has remained my bosom buddy [...] I am deeply saddened by her passing, but also relieved that she is released from the pain."

Arthur bequeathed $300,000 to the Ali Forney Center, a New York City organization that provides housing for homeless LGBTQ+ youths. The center was heavily damaged in October 2012 by Hurricane Sandy, but has since been restored and re-opened. The Bea Arthur Residence, which opened in 2017, is an 18-bed residence in Manhattan for homeless LGBTQ youth operated by the Ali Forney Center.

== Awards ==
| Award | Year | Category | Work | Result |
|---|---|---|---|---|
| Primetime Emmy Award | 1973 | Outstanding Continued Performance by an Actress in a Leading Role in a Comedy Series | Maude | Nominated |
| Primetime Emmy Award | 1974 | Best Lead Actress in a Comedy Series | Maude | Nominated |
| Primetime Emmy Award | 1976 | Outstanding Lead Actress in a Comedy Series | Maude | Nominated |
| Primetime Emmy Award | 1977 | Outstanding Lead Actress in a Comedy Series | Maude | Won |
| Primetime Emmy Award | 1978 | Outstanding Lead Actress in a Comedy Series | Maude | Nominated |
| Primetime Emmy Award | 1978 | Outstanding Continuing or Single Performance by a Supporting Actress in a Variety or Music | Laugh-In | Nominated |
| Primetime Emmy Award | 1986 | Outstanding Lead Actress in a Comedy Series | The Golden Girls | Nominated |
| Primetime Emmy Award | 1987 | Outstanding Lead Actress in a Comedy Series | The Golden Girls | Nominated |
| Primetime Emmy Award | 1988 | Outstanding Lead Actress in a Comedy Series | The Golden Girls | Won |
| Primetime Emmy Award | 1989 | Outstanding Lead Actress in a Comedy Series | The Golden Girls | Nominated |
| Primetime Emmy Award | 2000 | Outstanding Guest Actress in a Comedy Series | Malcolm in the Middle | Nominated |
| Golden Globe Award | 1973 | Best Actress – Comedy or Musical Series | Maude | Nominated |
| Golden Globe Award | 1974 | Best Actress – Comedy or Musical Series | Maude | Nominated |
| Golden Globe Award | 1975 | Best Supporting Actress – Motion Picture | Mame | Nominated |
| Golden Globe Award | 1976 | Best Actress – Comedy or Musical Series | Maude | Nominated |
| Golden Globe Award | 1978 | Best Actress – Comedy or Musical Series | Maude | Nominated |
| Golden Globe Award | 1986 | Best Actress – Comedy or Musical Series | The Golden Girls | Nominated |
| Golden Globe Award | 1987 | Best Actress – Comedy or Musical Series | The Golden Girls | Nominated |
| Golden Globe Award | 1988 | Best Actress – Comedy or Musical Series | The Golden Girls | Nominated |
| Golden Globe Award | 1989 | Best Actress – Comedy or Musical Series | The Golden Girls | Nominated |
| Tony Award | 1966 | Best Featured Actress in a Musical | Mame | Won |

An Emmy and Tony Award winner, Arthur was an Academy Award away from achieving the Triple Crown of Acting status.

Arthur won the American Theatre Wing's Tony Award in 1966 as Best Featured Actress in a Musical for her performance that year as Vera Charles in the original Broadway production of Jerry Herman's musical Mame.

Arthur received the third most nominations for the Primetime Emmy Award for Outstanding Lead Actress in a Comedy Series with nine; only Julia Louis-Dreyfus (12) and Mary Tyler Moore (10) have more. She received the Academy of Television Arts & Sciences' Emmy Award for Outstanding Lead Actress in a Comedy Series twice, once in 1977 for Maude and again in 1988 for The Golden Girls. She also received the third most nominations for the Golden Globe Award for Best Actress – Television Series Musical or Comedy with eight, only Carol Burnett (12) and Candice Bergen (9) have more; Arthur tied with Debra Messing as actress with most nominations without ever winning.

Arthur was inducted into the academy's Television Hall of Fame in 2008.

On June 8, 2008, The Golden Girls was awarded the Pop Culture award at the Sixth Annual TV Land Awards. Arthur (in one of her final public appearances) accepted the award with McClanahan and White.

== Filmography ==
=== Film ===
| Year | Title | Role | Notes |
|---|---|---|---|
| 1959 | That Kind of Woman | WAC | Uncredited |
| 1970 | Lovers and Other Strangers | Bea Vecchio | |
| 1974 | Mame | Vera Charles | |
| 1981 | History of the World, Part I | Dole office clerk | Uncredited |
| 1995 | For Better or Worse | Beverly Makeshift | Uncredited |
| 2000 | Enemies of Laughter | Paul's Mother | |

=== Television ===
| Year | Film | Role | Notes |
|---|---|---|---|
| 1951–1958 | Kraft Television Theatre | | |
| 1951 | Once Upon a Tune | | |
| 1951–1953, 1955–1958 | Studio One in Hollywood | | |
| 1955 | Max Liebman Presents: Kaleidoscope | | |
| 1954–1956 | Caesar's Hour | | Regular performer |
| 1957 | Washington Square | | 2 episodes |
| 1957 | The Steve Allen Show | | |
| 1958 | The Seven Lively Arts | | |
| 1958 | Tonight Starring Jack Paar | | |
| 1958 | Omnibus | | |
| 1958 | The Gift of the Magi | | Television film |
| 1959 | The George Gobel Show | | |
| 1960 | The Best of Anything | | Television film |
| 1961 | The Perry Como Show | | |
| 1962 | The Garry Moore Show | | |
| 1963 | The Sid Caesar Show | | |
| 1971–1972 | All in the Family | Maude Findlay | 2 episodes |
| 1972–1978 | Maude | Maude Findlay | 141 episodes |
| 1973 | The 45th Annual Academy Awards | | |
| 1974 | The 28th Annual Tony Awards | | |
| 1974–1980 | The Mike Douglas Show | | 6 episodes |
| 1974–1985 | The Merv Griffin Show | | 3 episodes |
| 1974–1990 | The Tonight Show Starring Johnny Carson | | 8 episodes |
| 1975–1980 | Dinah! | | 5 episodes |
| 1976–1979 | Saturday Night Live | | 2 episodes |
| 1976 | Cos | Herself | |
| 1977 | The 31st Annual Tony Awards | | |
| 1977 | The 29th Annual Primetime Emmy Awards | | |
| 1977 | Laugh-In | | |
| 1978 | CBS: On the Air | | |
| 1978 | The 30th Annual Primetime Emmy Awards | | |
| 1978 | Star Wars Holiday Special | Ackmena | Television film |
| 1979 | The Mary Tyler Moore Hour | Herself | Episode #1.2 |
| 1980 | The Beatrice Arthur Special | Herself (Host / Performer) | Television special |
| 1980 | 30 Years of TV Comedy's Greatest Hits: To Laughter with Love | | |
| 1980 | Soap | Angel | Episode: "Jessica's Wonderful Life" |
| 1980 | Bob Hope Special: Bob Hope-Hope, Women and Song | | |
| 1981 | Omnibus | | |
| 1981 | The 35th Annual Tony Awards | | |
| 1981 | The 33rd Annual Primetime Emmy Awards | | |
| 1982 | Bob Hope's Women I Love: Beautiful But Funny | | |
| 1982 | Nights of 100 Stars | | |
| 1982 | Broadway Plays Washington on Kennedy Center Tonight | | |
| 1982 | Madame's Place | Herself | |
| 1983 | Amanda's | Amanda Cartwright | 13 episodes |
| 1983 | The 9th Annual People's Choice Awards | | |
| 1984 | The Dean Martin Celebrity Roast: Joan Collins | | |
| 1984 | The 1st Academy TV Hall of Fame | | |
| 1984 | a.k.a. Pablo | Press Agent | Episode: "My Son, the Gringo" |
| 1984 | P.O.P. | Rosalyn Gordon | Television film |
| 1985–1992 | The Golden Girls | Dorothy Zbornak | 180 episodes |
| 1985 | The NBC All Star Hour | | |
| 1985 | The 37th Annual Primetime Emmy Awards | | |
| 1985 | The 10th Circus of the Stars | | |
| 1985 | The 40th Annual Tony Awards | | |
| 1985–2008 | Entertainment Tonight | Herself | 7 episodes |
| 1986 | All Star Party for Clint Eastwood | | |
| 1986 | The 38th Annual Primetime Emmy Awards | | |
| 1986 | NBC 60th Anniversary Celebration | | |
| 1986 | The 43rd Annual Golden Globe Awards | | |
| 1986 | Walt Disney World's 15th Birthday Celebration | | |
| 1986 | Late Night with David Letterman | | |
| 1986 | The 46th Annual Golden Apple Awards | | |
| 1986 | The Kennedy Center Honors: A Celebration of the Performing Arts | | |
| 1987 | The 39th Annual Primetime Emmy Awards | | |
| 1987 | All Star Party for Joan Collins | | |
| 1987 | Comic Relief '87 | | |
| 1987 | All Star Gala at Ford's Theater | Host | |
| 1987 | The 1st Annual American Comedy Awards | | |
| 1987 | The 44th Annual Golden Globe Awards | | |
| 1987 | The 13th Annual People's Choice Awards | | |
| 1987 | This Is Your Life | | |
| 1987 | Happy 100th Birthday Hollywood | | |
| 1987 | Sally Jessy Raphael Show | | |
| 1987 | The 41st Annual Tony Awards | | |
| 1987 | Family Comedy Hour | | |
| 1988 | The 9th Annual American Black Achievement Awards | | |
| 1988 | The 45th Annual Golden Globe Awards | | |
| 1988 | In Performance at the White House; A Salute to Broadway: Showstoppers | | |
| 1988 | Irving Berlin's 100th Birthday Celebration | | |
| 1988 | The 40th Annual Primetime Emmy Awards | | |
| 1988 | An Evening at the Improv | Herself | |
| 1988 | Mickey's 60th Birthday | Dorothy Zbornak | |
| 1988 | The 13th Circus of the Stars | | |
| 1988 | My First Love | Jean Miller | Television movie |
| 1989 | The 46th Annual Golden Globe Awards | | |
| 1989 | Empty Nest | Dorothy Zbornak | Episode: "Dumped" |
| 1989 | The 3rd Annual American Comedy Awards | | |
| 1989 | Bob Hope's Birthday Spectacular in Paris | | |
| 1989 | The Society of Singers Presents a Tribute to Ella Fitzgerald | | |
| 1989 | The 41st Annual Primetime Emmy Awards | | |
| 1989 | Later with Bob Costas | | |
| 1989 | The Arsenio Hall Show | | |
| 1989 | The 49th Annual Golden Apple Awards | | |
| 1989 | Live with Regis and Kathie Lee | | |
| 1990 | The TV Academy Tribute to Angela Lansbury | | |
| 1990 | The 21st BAFTA Awards | | |
| 1990 | The 4th Annual American Comedy Awards | | |
| 1990 | The Earth Day Special | | |
| 1990 | Aspel & Company | | |
| 1990 | Night of 100 Stars III | | |
| 1990 | The 42nd Annual Primetime Emmy Awards | | |
| 1990 | Des O'Connor Tonight | | |
| 1990 | A Conversation with Dinah | | |
| 1990 | Live from the London Palladium: Happy Birthday, Happy New Year! | | |
| 1991 | The 17th Annual People Choice Awards | | |
| 1991 | The 48th Annual Golden Globe Awards | | |
| 1991 | The 5th Annual American Comedy Awards | | |
| 1991 | The 43rd Annual Primetime Emmy Awards | | |
| 1991 | Funny Women of Television | | |
| 1991 | Dame Edna's Hollywood | | |
| 1992 | Evening at Pops | | |
| 1992 | The Howard Stern Show | | |
| 1992 | Guest Night | | |
| 1992 | The 6th Annual American Comedy Awards | | |
| 1992 | The Golden Palace | Dorothy Hollingsworth | Episodes: "Seems Like Old Times" (Parts 1 & 2) |
| 1992 | Verstehen Sie Spaß? | | |
| 1992 | The 1992 Pacific Center HIV-AIDS Benefit | | |
| 1993 | The 7th Annual American Comedy Awards | | |
| 1993 | Out There | | |
| 1993 | This Joint is Jumpin' | | |
| 1993 | The 47th Annual Tony Awards | | |
| 1993 | Boulevard Bio | | |
| 1993 | Sean's Show | | |
| 1994 | Jerry Herman's Broadway at the Hollywood Bowl | Herself (Performer) | Television special |
| 1994 | The 8th Annual American Comedy Awards | | |
| 1994 | Bob Hope's Birthday Memories | | |
| 1994 | She TV | | |
| 1995 | The 9th Annual Genesis Awards | | |
| 1995 | 50 Years of Funny Females | | |
| 1995 | This Morning | | |
1996
| 1996 | Judge Judy | Herself | 1 Episode: A witness for a defendant affiliated with the animal rights organization PETA |
| 1996 | The 10th American Comedy Awards | | |
| 1996 | The 50th Annual Tony Awards | | |
| 1997 | Dave's World | Mel Bloom | 3 episodes |
| 1997 | The Rosie O'Donnell Show | | |
| 1998 | The RuPaul Show | | |
| 1998 | Ellen | Herself | Episode: "Ellen: A Hollywood Tribute: Part 1" |
| 1998 | CBS: The First 50 Years | | |
| 1998 | NY TV: By the People Who Made It-Part I & II | | |
| 1999 | The 53rd Annual Tony Awards | | |
| 1999 | Beggars and Choosers | Herself | 5 episodes |
| 1999 | Emily of New Moon | The Voice | Episode: "A Fall from Grace" |
| 1999 | The Martin Short Show | | |
| 2000 | So Graham Norton | | |
| 2000 | Malcolm in the Middle | Mrs. White | Episode: "Water Park" |
| 2000 | Intimate Portrait: Rue McClanahan | | |
| 2000 | E! True Hollywood Story: The Golden Girls | | |
| 2000 | E! True Hollywood Story: Good Times | | |
| 2000 | E! True Hollywood Story: All in the Family | | |
| 2000 | The 70s: The Decade That Changed Television | | |
| 2001 | Intimate Portrait: Estelle Getty | | |
| 2001 | Futurama | Femputer | Voice; Episode: "Amazon Women in the Mood" |
| 2001 | Today | | |
| 2002–2007 | The View | Herself / Guest | 2 episodes |
| 2002 | CBS News Sunday Morning | | |
| 2002 | The Rosie O'Donnell Show | | |
| 2002 | Good Morning America | | |
| 2002 | The Daily Show | | |
| 2002 | The Big O! True West Hollywood Story | | |
| 2002 | TV Most Censored Moments | | |
| 2002 | TV Tales: The Golden Girls | | |
| 2002 | Open Mike with Mike Bullard | | |
| 2002 | Because I Said So | | |
| 2002 | Inside TV Land: Taboo TV | | |
| 2003 | Great Women on Television Comedy | | |
| 2003 | Intimate Portrait: Bea Arthur | | |
| 2003 | TV Land Awards: A Celebration of Classic TV | | |
| 2003 | Rove Live | | |
| 2003 | Broadway: The Golden Age by the Legends Who Were There | | |
| 2003 | Through the Keyhole | | |
| 2003 | The Golden Girls: Their Greatest Moments | Herself (Host) | Television special |
| 2003 | Today with Des and Mel | | |
| 2003 | Richard & Judy | | |
| 2003 | The Terry and Gaby Show | | |
| 2004 | The 2nd Annual TV Land Awards: A Celebration of Classic TV | | |
| 2004 | Great Performances | | |
| 2004 | The Best of So Graham Norton | | |
| 2004 | Inside TV Land: Primetime Politics | | |
| 2004 | TV's Greatest Sidekicks | | |
| 2005 | Inside TV Land: Tickled Pink | | |
| 2005 | Comedy Central Roast of Pamela Anderson | | |
| 2005 | TV Land Confidential | | |
| 2005 | Curb Your Enthusiasm | Larry's mother | Episode: "The End" |
| 2006 | Biography: Bea Arthur | | |
| 2006 | The 100 Greatest TV Quotes & Catchphrases | Herself | 5 episodes |
| 2007 | TV Land Confidential | Herself / Interviewee | Documentary (4 episodes) |
| 2007 | Back to the Grind | Herself | Bea Arthur and Ed Begley Jr. |
| 2007 | Entertainment Weekly & TV Land Present: The 50 Greatest TV Icons | | |
| 2008 | The 6th Annual TV Land Awards | Herself | Winner |
| 2008 | Inside Edition | Herself | Documentary |
| 2014 | Broadway: Beyond The Golden Age | | |

== Theater performances ==
| Year | Title | Role | Notes |
|---|---|---|---|
| 1947 | Lysistrata | | |
| 1947 | Gas | | |
| 1947 | The Dog Beneath the Skin | | |
| 1947 | Yerma | | |
| 1948 | No Exit | | |
| 1948 | The Taming of the Shrew | Katherina | National Tour |
| 1948 | Six Characters in Search of an Author | | |
| 1948 | The Owl and the Pussycat | | |
| 1949 | Le Bourgeois Gentilhomme | | |
| 1949 | Yes is for a Very Young Man | | |
| 1949 | The Creditors | | |
| 1949 | Heartbreak House | | |
| 1951 | Gentlemen Prefer Blondes | | |
| 1951 | Personal Appearance | | |
| 1951 | Candle Light | | |
| 1951 | Love or Money | | |
| 1951 | The Voice of the Turtle | | |
| 1953 | The New Moon | | |
| 1954–55 | The Threepenny Opera | Lucy Brown | Broadway debut |
| 1955 | What's the Rush? | | |
| 1955 | Shoestring Revue | Performer, "Garbage" | Revue: Introduced the song "Garbage" |
| 1955 | Plain and Fancy | Understudy: Ruth Winters | |
| 1955 | Seventh Heaven | Mme. Suze | |
| 1956 | Mistress of the Inn | | |
| 1956 | Ziegfeld Follies | Performer: Understudy to Tallulah Bankhead | Revue |
| 1956 | Shoestring '57 | Performer, "Garbage" | |
| 1957 | Hamlet | Offstage Voice (Queen Gertrude) | |
| 1957 | Nature's Way | Nadine Fesser | |
| 1958 | Ulysses in Nighttown | | |
| 1959 | Chic | | |
| 1960 | The Gay Divorcee at the Cherry Lane | | |
| 1962 | A Matter of Position | | |
| 1964 | Fiddler on the Roof | Yente the Matchmaker | |
| 1966 | Mame | Vera Charles | Tony Award for Best Featured Actress in a Musical |
| 1968 | A Mother's Kisses | | Closed on the road |
| 1981 | The Floating Lightbulb | Enid Pollack | |
| 1981 | Hey, Look Me Over! | | |
| 1994 | Easter Bonnet Competition: A Salute to 100 Years of Broadway | | |
| 1994 | La fille du régiment | Duchesse de Krakenthorp | Metropolitan Opera appearance |
| 1995–96 | Bermuda Avenue Triangle | | |
| November 17, 1996 | Angela Lansbury – A Celebration | | Benefit concert |
| 1997–98 | After Play | | |
| 1998 | Jubilee | | |
| 1999 | Thoroughly Modern Millie | Mrs. Meers | Pre-Broadway Workshop |
| 2000 | Strike Up the Band | Mrs. Grace Draper | |
| 2000 | The Threepenny Opera Reunion Concert | Lucy Brown | |
| 2000–2006 | An Evening with Bea Arthur | | Westport, Connecticut (July 28–30, 2000) Santa Fe, New Mexico (September 24, 2002); Los Angeles, California (January 31 – February 1, 2004); Saugatuck, Michigan (May 22–23, 2004); Provincetown, Massachusetts (August 21, 2004); Columbus, Georgia (October 30, 2004); Nyack, New York (March 4–6, 2005); Fort Wayne, Indiana (April 17, 2005); Mount Pleasant, Michigan (April 19, 2005); Atlantic City, New Jersey (June 3–4, 2005); Holmdel, New Jersey (June 7, 2005); Las Vegas, Nevada (August 27, 2005); Hampton, Virginia (September 16–17, 2005); Alexandria, Virginia (September 22, 2005); Geneva, New York (September 24, 2005); San Francisco, California (January 7, 2006); Salem, Oregon (January 21, 2006); Scottsdale, Arizona (February 24–25, 2006); University Park, Illinois (March 19, 2006) |
| 2001–2003 | And Then There's Bea | | United States Tour (April 24, 2001 – January 13, 2002) Melbourne, Australia (October 15–27, 2002); Sydney, Australia (October 29 – November 10, 2002); Johannesburg, South Africa (August 12–24, 2003); Cape Town, South Africa (August 26 – September 7, 2003) |
| 2002 | Bea Arthur on Broadway: Just Between Friends | | New York, New York (January 29, 2002 – April 14, 2002) Toronto, Canada (November 20 – December 8, 2002) |
| 2003 | Bea Arthur at The Savoy | | London, England (September 15 – October 18, 2003) |
| 2004 | A Celebration of Life | | Washington, D.C. (May 26, 2004) |
| 2004 | There'll Be Another Spring: A Tribute to Miss Peggy Lee | | at the Hollywood Bowl, Hollywood, California (July 14, 2004) |
| 2004 | Bea Arthur at the El Portal | | North Hollywood, California (August 5–8, 2004) |
| 2005 | Bea Arthur Back on Broadway (at 95th Street) | | New York, New York (November 21, 2005) |
| 2006 | Bea Arthur Back at the El Portal | | North Hollywood, California (February 16–19, 2006) |
