= Live2D =

Motion-capture animation for 2D graphics

Live2D is a proprietary 2D animation library developed by the Japanese software company Live2D Ltd. (formerly Cyber Noise). The format allows the creation of rigged character models—usually in an anime art style—consisting of two-dimensional textures divided into layers. These layers can then be tweened and warped in order to allow 2.5D motion. Live2D models can be integrated into software via an SDK, while a program known as Live2D Cubism serves as its authoring environment for importing and rigging models.

Live2D has been primarily used as part of video games—including in particular visual novels such as Nekopara, and mobile gacha games such as Azur Lane and Hatsune Miku: Colorful Stage! among others. Live2D models can also be used by facial motion capture software such as FaceRig and VTube Studio, allowing a model's head movement and expressions to be puppeted using input from a webcam or phone camera; this technique is used most prominently by VTubers.

Live2D typically refers to the Live2D Ltd. software, but has sometimes been used as a generic trademark to refer to similar tween-based animation techniques, even if they do not use the software.

== History ==
=== Background ===
Live2D was first introduced in 2008 to resolve the need for interactive media. Since then, the technology has also changed how games enhance user experience through lively characters and expressions.

In 2009, Cybernoids Co. Ltd. (now Live2D Ltd.) released their very first Live2D application, Live2D Vector. The application transforms vector graphics to make flat character images achieve three-dimensional head turning and moving effects. Although such characters can only perform limited activities, they perform much better than static pictures or slideshows. Users can also customize their moving character by adjusting parameters through software or collecting materials such as images of different angles of a character. Although the occupied capacity resources are reduced, the rendering of complex images consumes a lot of CPU and RAM. Also, while it can be difficult to work with more traditional art styles such as oil painting or gouache styles, creators have been experimenting with these styles with success.

The first application of the Live2D technique is HibikiDokei, released by sandwichproject (株式会社レジストプランニング), an alarm app released in 2010. The alarm app has a girl character named "Hibiki" who talks and moves.

In 2011, Live2D adopted PSP game Ore no Imōto ga Konna ni Kawaii Wake ga Nai Portable released by NAMCO BANDAI Games Inc. became the first game of the O.I.U. A system derived from Live2D technology was applied in a game, where the character moves and changes positions and expression while talking to the player. Characters moved expressively on the screen and seamlessly like a traditionally-animated anime, which interested players and contributed to popularity of Live2D.

== Software ==
=== Live2D Ltd. ===
Live2D
- Developer: Tetsuya Nakajo
- Platform: Microsoft Windows, macOS
- License: Proprietary
- Website: www.live2d.com/en/

Software developer Tetsuya Nakashiro had been independently developing Live2D software and founded the company Cyber Noise (or Cybernoids, Japanese:サイバーノイズ) in 2006 with support from the Exploratory IT Human Resources Project of the Japanese Information Technology Promotion Agency (IPA). Because of its novelty and lack of uptake, Cyber Noise was unsuccessful.

In 2011, Live2D software received attention after its use in the PSP game Ore no Imōto ga Konna ni Kawaii Wake ga Nai Portable. It subsequently received interest as a library for Android and iOS. Following this success, in 2014, Cyber Noise subsequently renamed itself to Live2D Ltd., unifying with its product name. Sales of Live2D have had significant growth since then. In 2021, 70% of Live2D Cubism Pro users are or create Vtubers, followed by games/app developers and animation/video creators.

Live2D Ltd. provides its software and SDKs under both commercial licenses and as freeware.

==== Software ====
- Live2D Cubism
- Live2D Cubism Editor
- Live2D Euclid (released in April 2017, no longer available from October 16, 2018)
- Live2D CubismM
- Live2DViewerEX

==== Official marketplace ====
- nizima: nizima is a platform where users can buy and sell illustrations, Live2D data, or make-to-order transactions. Illustrators and Live2D creators are able to work together on a character and share sales on the platform. The platform also provides a Live2D preview for users to see and move the model before purchasing.
- nizima LIVE: nizima LIVE is a PC application that allows anyone to easily move a Live2D model by recognizing and tracking facial expressions. From beginners who are new to the tracking app to intermediate and above who are already familiar with Live2D, you can enjoy it for various purposes, such as VTuber activities and avatars for calls and meetings.
- nizima Action: nizima Action is an online video editor specifically designed for creating short-form Live2D content, allowing users to easily create rich video edits in their browser, and it's perfect for producing short videos of about 1 to 5 minutes.

=== Other Live2D Animation Software ===
Animation software is able to combine with the Live2D system to create real-time animated avatars through motion capture, character animation and computer-generated imagery, including:

==== Animation software ====
Title	Platform
Adobe Character Animator	Windows, MacOS
CrazyTalk	Windows
FaceRig	Windows
Motion Live 2D	Windows
Toon Boom Harmony	Windows, MacOS

==== Face-tracking software ====
Title	Platform
Hololive	iOS
Nijisanji	Android, iOS

== Works using Live2D ==
=== Visual novels ===
Title	Platform	Original release date
Mashiroiro Symphony	Windows, PSP	2009
Ensemble Girls!	Android, iOS	2012
Tokimeki Restaurant	Android, iOS	2013
Nekopara	Windows, macOS	2014
City of Love: Paris	Android, iOS	2017
Date A Live: Rio Reincarnation	Windows, PS4	2017
Crystalline	Android, iOS	2018
Kaori After Story	Android, iOS	2018
Runa's School Story	Windows, macOS	2019
Ethereal Enigma	Android, iOS	2020
Sophistry	Windows, Linux, macOS	2021
Heartbeat! -After the Summer-	Windows, macOS	2022
Anonymous;Code	Nintendo Switch, PS4, Windows	2022
OPPAI Ero App Academy Bigger, Better, Electric Boobaloo!	Windows	2023
The Fox Awaits Me HANA	Windows	2023

=== Mobile games ===
Title	Platform	Original release date
Battle Girl High School	Android, iOS	2015
BraveSword×BlazeSoul	Android, iOS	2015
Ensemble Stars!	Android, iOS	2015
Potion Maker	Android, iOS	2015
YUMEIRO CAST	Android, iOS	2015
Moe Girl Cafe 2	Android, iOS	2016
Destiny Child	Android, iOS	2016
Girls' Frontline	Android, iOS	2016
Azur Lane	Android, iOS	2017
Brave Nine	Android, iOS	2017
BanG Dream! Girls Band Party!	Android, iOS, Nintendo Switch	2017
Depose Girls (Houchi Shoujo)	Android, iOS	2017
Magia Record: Puella Magi Madoka Magica Side Story	Android, iOS	2017
Neptunia & Friends	Android, iOS	2017
Dream Girlfriend	Android, iOS	2017
Project Tokyo Dolls	Android, iOS	2017
Raramagi	Android, iOS	2017
Uta no Prince-sama: Shining Live	Android, iOS	2017
Epic Seven	Android, iOS	2018
Shoujo Kageki Revue Starlight-Re LIVE	Android, iOS	2018
Mashiro Witch: Marchen of Midnight	Android, iOS	2018
Ayakashi: Romance Reborn	Android, iOS	2018
Promise of Wizard	Android, iOS	2019
Girl Cafe Gun	Android, iOS	2019
Counter:Side	Android, iOS	2019
Mirage Memorial	Android, iOS	2019
Palette Parade	Android, iOS	2019
My Stella Knights	Android, iOS	2020
Disney: Twisted-Wonderland	Android, iOS	2020
Goddess Kiss: OVE Generation	Android, iOS	2020
Hatsune Miku: Colorful Stage!	Android, iOS	2020
D4DJ Groovy Mix	Android, iOS	2020
Illusion Connect	Android, iOS	2020
SINoALICE	Android, iOS	2020
Zgirls3	Android, iOS	2020
Re:Zero − Starting Life in Another World: Lost in Memories	Android, iOS	2020
Assault Lily: Last Bullet	Android, iOS	2021
KonoSuba: Fantastic Days	Android, iOS	2021
Artery Gear: Fusion	Android, iOS	2021
Metal Waltz	Android, iOS	2021
Alchemy Stars	Android, iOS	2021
B-PROJECT Ryūsei*Fantasia	Android, iOS, Nintendo Switch	2021
Blue Archive	Android, iOS	2021
Revived Witch	Android, iOS	2021
Destiny Girl	Android, iOS	2022
Dynasty Heroes: Romance Samkok	Android, iOS	2022
Yu-Gi-Oh! Master Duel	Android, iOS	2022
Idle Princess	Android, iOS	2022
Girls Academy	Android, iOS	2022
Clover Theater	Android, iOS	2022
Date A Live: Spirit Pledge HD	Android, iOS	2022
Echocalypse	Android, iOS	2022
MementoMori	Android, iOS	2022
Goddess of Victory: Nikke	Android, iOS	2022
Counter:Side	Android, iOS	2022
Path to Nowhere	Android, iOS	2022
Cherry Tale	Android, iOS	2022
The Tale of Food	Android, iOS	2023
Takt Op. Symphony	Android, iOS	2023
Love Live! School Idol Festival 2: Miracle Live!	Android, iOS	2023
Crazy Ones	Android, iOS	2023
Reverse: 1999	Android, iOS	2023
Trickcal Revive	Android, iOS	2023
Phantom of the Kill -Alternative Imitation-	Android, iOS	2024
Tokyo Debunker	Android, iOS	2024
Ride Kamens	Android, iOS	2024
18TRIP	Android, iOS	2024
STARSEED: Asnia Trigger	Android, iOS	2024
Echocalypse: The Scarlet Covenant	Android, iOS	2024
Die Neue Saga	Android, iOS	2024
Emberstoria	Android, iOS	2024
Jujutsu Kaisen: Phantom Parade	Android, iOS	2024
Journey Renewed: Fate Fantasy	Android, iOS	2024
Puella Magi Madoka Magica: Magia Exedra	Android, iOS	2025
Shadowverse: Worlds Beyond	Android, iOS	2025

=== Console games ===
Title	Platform	Original release date
Boku wa Tomodachi ga Sukunai (Haganai)	PSP	2012
Fire Emblem Fates	3DS	2015
Kancolle Kai	PS Vita	2016
Akiba's Beat	PS4, PS Vita	2016
Dark Rose Valkyrie	PS4, PS Vita	2016
Sword Art Online: Alicization Lycoris	PS4, Xbox One	2020
Azur Lane Crosswave	PS4, Nintendo Switch	2020
Neptunia: Sisters VS Sisters	PS4, PS5, Nintendo Switch, Xbox	2022
TOKYO PSYCHODEMIC	PS4, PS5, Nintendo Switch	2024

=== PC games ===
Title	Original release date
Herald: An Interactive Period Drama	2017
Namu Amida Butsu! -UTENA-	2019

== See also ==
- Aniforms
- Avatar (computing)
- CGI
- Character animation
- Computer animation
- Computer facial animation
- Digital puppetry
- Facial motion capture
- Motion capture
- Uncanny valley
- Virtual actor
- Virtual idol
- Virtual influencer
- Virtual YouTuber
