= VTuber =

Streamers that use virtual avatars

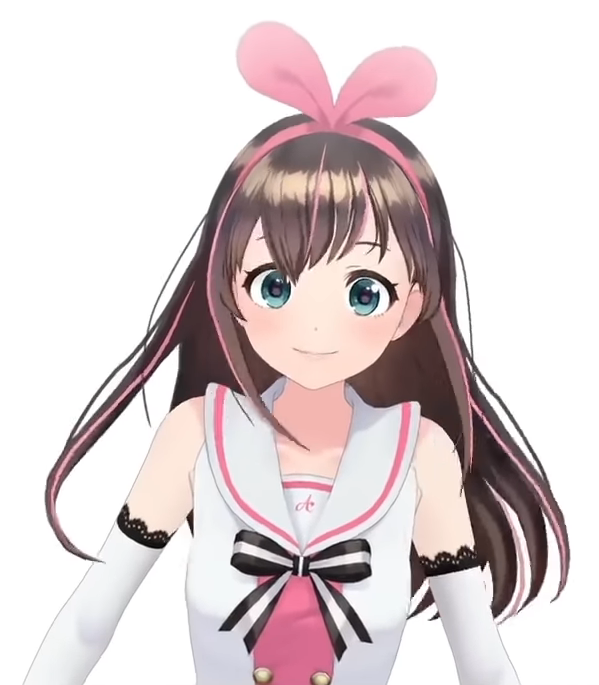
Kizuna AI was the first VTuber to achieve breakout popularity.

A VTuber (Japanese: ブイチューバー, Hepburn: BuiChūbā) or virtual YouTuber (バーチャルユーチューバー, bācharu YūChūbā) is an online entertainer who uses a virtual avatar generated using computer graphics. Real-time motion capture is often used to capture movement and changes in facial expression. The digital trend originated in Japan in the mid-2010s, and became an international online phenomenon in the 2020s. The majority of VTubers are live streamers. By 2020, there were more than 10,000 active VTubers. Although the term is an allusion to the video platform YouTube, they also use websites such as Niconico, Twitch, Facebook, Twitter, and Bilibili.

VTubers are associated with Japanese popular culture and aesthetics, such as anime and manga, and moe anthropomorphism with human or non-human traits. Some VTubers use anthropomorphic avatars, including non-human characters such as animals.

The first entertainer to use the phrase "virtual YouTuber", Kizuna AI, began creating content on YouTube in late 2016. Her popularity sparked a VTuber trend in Japan, and it spurred the establishment of specialized agencies to promote them, including major ones such as Hololive Production and Nijisanji. Fan translations and foreign-language VTubers have marked a rise in the trend's international popularity. Virtual YouTubers have appeared in domestic advertising campaigns and have broken livestream-related world records.

== Overview ==
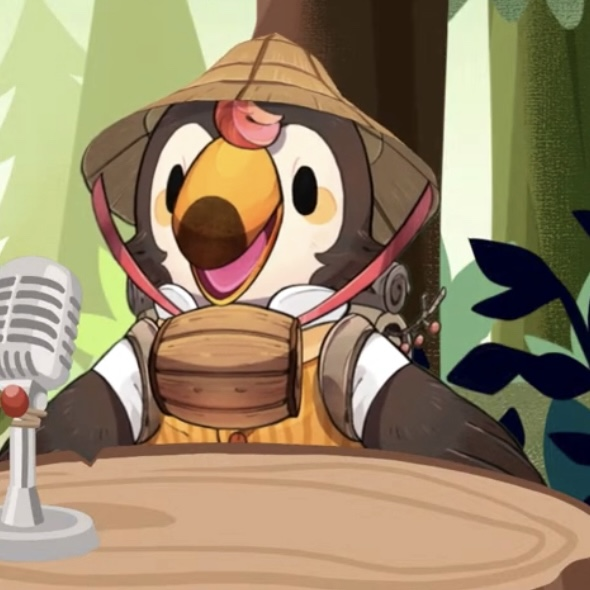
A VTuber presented in the animal form of a toco toucan

VTubers use avatars created with programs such as Live2D, portraying characters designed by online artists. VTubers are not bound by physical limitations, and many of them engage in activities that are unconstrained by their real-world identity. Some VTubers, particularly those from marginalized communities, choose to use avatars to reflect their online identity for personal comfort and safety reasons. Transgender VTubers may use their avatars as a means to better reflect their preferred presentation to their audience.

VTubers often portray themselves as a kayfabe character, not unlike professional wrestling; Mace, an AEW wrestler who himself began streaming on Twitch as a VTuber in 2021, remarked that the two professions were "literally the same thing". Ironmouse described her character as being akin to a superhero costume.

=== Technology ===
A VTuber using hand tracking to wave

A VTuber's avatar is typically animated using a webcam and software, which captures the streamer's motions, expressions, and mouth movements, and maps them to a two- or three-dimensional model. Both free and paid programs have been developed for loading models and performing motion capture, with some capable of being used without a webcam (albeit with pre-determined animations), and some also supporting virtual reality hardware, or hand tracking devices such as the Leap Motion Controller. More sophisticated forms of motion capture hardware geared primarily towards VTubers and social VR have also been developed, including Sony's Mocopi trackers and Movella's Obskur.

Some programs offload motion tracking to external phone cameras via mobile apps to save system resources, and take advantage of hardware features (such as Face ID on iPhone) that can enable more precise motion capture. In 2022, VTube Studio released an update integrating with the Nvidia Broadcast tools, allowing for NPU-accelerated facial motion capture on systems using Nvidia RTX graphics cards.

The proprietary animation software Live2D is typically used to rig two-dimensional models constructed from drawn textures. Three-dimensional models can also be used; these typically use VRM, an extension of the glTF specifications designed to define humanoid character avatars for metaverse applications, and is supported by software such as Liv (which composites VRM avatars into VR games) and VRoid Studio (which can be used to create anime-styled avatars and export them to VRM), and also can be converted for use in other software such as VRChat. Commissioned models can cost as high as US$2,000 depending on their level of detail.

Some VTubers, colloquially known as a "PNGTuber" (in reference to the PNG image format), use sprites as opposed to a rigged model, with different frames for conveying different emotions or actions.

=== Agencies and commercialization ===
Major VTubers are often employed by talent agencies, with business models influenced by those used by Japanese idol agencies. Streamers are employed by an agency (sometimes via open auditions) to portray characters developed by the company, which are then commercialized via merchandising and other promotional appearances, as well as traditional revenue streams such as monetization of their videos, and viewer donations. Another holdover from idol groups is the use of the term 'graduation' to refer to a VTuber retiring their character and/or leaving an agency on amicable terms.

In agencies, a VTuber's character and other assets are often the intellectual property of the agency; if they are not able to receive rights to their character's IP when departing an agency, former corporate VTubers may transition to streaming independently under an alternate persona, with their past identity usually treated as an open secret.

=== Personal and legal rights ===
With the rapid growth of the VTuber industry, the mental burden on performers (referred to in Japanese as nakanohito (中の人; "the person inside") and the ongoing online harassment directed at their avatars have emerged as significant structural challenges.

In September 2020, Anycolor, the corporation behind the Nijisanji agency, created an "Aggressive Acts and Slander Countermeasure Team" to offer counselling to victims of harassment and take legal measures against perpetrators of harassment, specifically the online harassment plaguing the Japanese entertainment industry. This announcement came in the wake of Hololive's VTuber Mano Aloe's retirement after only two weeks of activity due to online harassment.

A unique legal issue within this space is whether insults aimed at a fictional avatar legally constitute defamation against the actual performer behind it. In Japan, judicial precedents have begun to establish that if viewers equate the virtual avatar with the performer, infringing acts against the avatar can be legally recognized as an infringement of the performer's personal rights. This legal framework has enabled performers and their agencies to successfully file requests for the disclosure of perpetrators' identifying information, as demonstrated by a landmark ruling by the Tokyo District Court in 2022.

== History ==
=== Predecessors ===
On February 12, 2010, visual novel maker Nitroplus began uploading videos to its YouTube channel featuring an animated 3D version of its mascot Super Sonico, who would usually talk to the audience about herself or about releases related to the company. On June 13, 2011, UK-based Japanese vlogger Ami Yamato uploaded her first video, which featured an animated, virtual avatar speaking to the camera. In 2012, Japanese company Weathernews Inc. debuted a Vocaloid-styled character called Weatheroid Type A Airi on SOLiVE24, a 24-hour weather live stream on Nico Nico Douga, on YouTube and their website. In 2014, Airi got her own solo program every Thursday and began live broadcasting with motion capture.

In 2014, the FaceRig indie software launched on Indiegogo as a crowdfunding project and later on Steam, becoming the first software suite that enabled live avatars at home via face motion capture and leading to animated avatars starting to be actively used on streaming websites and YouTube. The Live2D software module enabling 2D avatars and was added one year later in 2015 in collaboration with Live2D, Inc.

=== Breakout ===
Hololive Production, under Cover Corporation, manages over 90 VTubers from around the world.

Nijisanji, under AnyColor Inc., manages over 160 VTubers from around the world across two branches; NIJISANJI and NIJISANJI EN.

VShojo was founded in November 2020 as one of the first VTuber agencies based in the Western world.

In late 2016, Kizuna AI, the first VTuber to achieve breakout popularity, made her debut on YouTube. She was the first to coin and use the term "virtual YouTuber". Created by digital production company Activ8 and voice-acted by Nozomi Kasuga, Kizuna AI created a sense of "real intimacy" with fans, as she was responsive to their questions. Within ten months, she had over two million subscribers and later became a culture ambassador of the Japan National Tourism Organization. Kizuna AI's popularity can be attributed to the oversaturation of traditional webcam YouTubers and for aspects of characters that the audience would not expect. For example, despite her otherwise juvenile appearance, Kizuna AI often uses profanity in her videos when she gets frustrated while playing a game.

=== The VTuber trend ===
Kizuna AI's sudden popularity sparked a VTuber trend. Between May and mid-July 2018, the number of active VTubers increased from 2,000 to 4,000. Kaguya Luna and Mirai Akari followed Kizuna as the second and third most popular VTubers, with 750,000 and 625,000 subscribers respectively. Nekomiya Hinata and Siro, two other early VTubers, each gained followings of 500,000 in six months.

In the beginning of 2018, Anycolor Inc. (then known as Ichikara) founded the VTuber agency Nijisanji. Nijisanji helped popularise the use of Live2D models instead of the prior focus on 3D models as well as the shift towards livestreaming instead of edited video and clips that was the standard for VTubers like Kizuna Ai. Cover Corporation, a company that was originally developing augmented and virtual reality software, shifted its focus to VTubers by establishing Hololive.

After their initial success in Japan, the trend began to expand internationally via their appeal to the anime and manga fandom. Agencies like Hololive and Nijisanji created branches in China, South Korea, Indonesia, and India, as well as English-language branches targeting a global audience. Meanwhile, independent VTubers began to appear in many countries, from Japan to the United States. In July 2018, VTubers had a collective subscriber count of 12.7 million, and more than 720 million total views. By January 2020, there were over 10,000 VTubers.

The COVID-19 pandemic led to an overall increase in viewership of video game live streaming in general in 2020, which helped contribute to the growth of VTubers into a mainstream phenomenon. Searches on Google for VTuber related content increased over 2020, leading towards the September 2020 launch of Hololive's English branch. In August 2020, seven of the ten largest Super Chat earners of all time on YouTube were VTubers, including Hololive member Kiryu Coco at number one, who by that time had earned approximately ¥85 million (approximately US$800,000 in 2020). VTubers accounted for 38% of YouTube's 300 most profitable channels, with a total revenue of US$26,229,911 (roughly half of which being viewer donations). YouTube's 2020 Culture and Trends report highlights VTubers as one of the notable trends of that year, with 1.5 billion views per month by October.

At the same time, the popularity of VTubers continued to rise on Twitch, with a host of several notable English-speaking VTubers such as then VShojo members Projekt Melody and Ironmouse. Pokimane also experimented with avatar-based streams using a model commissioned from a VTuber artist.

On March 30, 2021, Kizuna AI was chosen as one of Asia's top 60 influencers. In May 2021, Twitch added a VTuber tag for streams as part of a wider expansion of its tag system. On 30 June 2021, Gawr Gura—a member of Hololive's first English branch—overtook Kizuna Ai as the most-subscribed VTuber on YouTube.

Cover's CEO Motoaki "Yagoo" Tanigo was selected as one of the Japan's Top 20 Entrepreneurs by Forbes Japan in its January 2022 issue. The following month, in the midst of a subathon event, Ironmouse accumulated the largest number of active paid subscriptions of all streamers on the platform at that point in time, although still behind an overall record previously set by Ludwig. According to data provided by parent company Amazon, VTubing content on Twitch grew by 467% in 2021 compared with a year earlier. In December 2022, the independent VTuber Neuro-sama gained attention on Twitch for her use of a large language model attached to a speech synthesis system to interact with her audience.

In February 2024, Anycolor faced criticism over the treatment of its talent, following the termination of its contract with Nijisanji EN streamer Selen Tatsuki. The company cited "repeated breaches of contract", "misleading statements on social platforms", and actions causing payment delays for commissions to outside artists. After rebranding as the independent VTuber Dokibird, she stated that she had been hospitalized in December 2023 as a result of "bullying from within", and she had been in a "toxic and poor environment for numerous months that led to my breaking point". The claims regarding payments for commissions were also refuted by artists who had worked on content for Tatsuki—who had paid them personally. Criticism over Nijisanji's handling and response to the controversy resulted in declines to Anycolor's stock price, and multiple Nijisanji streamers announcing that they would take a hiatus from social media activity.

In September 2024, Ironmouse hit over 320,000 active paid subscribers on Twitch, surpassing the previous record holder, Kai Cenat. On January 1, 2025, Neuro-sama broke the all-time hype train record on Twitch, reaching level 111 and surpassing the previous record holder, Pirate Software, who reached level 106. In December 2025, Neuro-sama surpassed her previous all-time hype train record, reaching level 123. In January 2026, Neuro-sama surpassed her previous all-time hype train record, reaching level 126, and garnering over 328,000 active paid subscribers on Twitch, the third highest of all time.

In May 2025, YouTube published a Culture and Trends Report on virtual creators. Per this report, VTuber related videos has amassed an annual average of over 50 billion views since 2022, and 16 of the 20 channels with the largest all time Super Chat Revenue were VTuber channels. Per a survey conducted by Google, 57% of 14 to 44-year-olds had watched a VTuber or virtual influencer in the past year.

On July 21, 2025, VShojo founding member Ironmouse announced that she would leave the agency effective immediately amid legal issues, accusing the company of withholding Twitch revenue from her, including around $500,000 in revenue intended to be donated to the Immune Deficiency Foundation, for over a year; an associated charity campaign organized by Ironmouse quickly raised over $1,000,000, more than doubling the original amount of withheld revenue. On July 24, VShojo CEO Justin "theGunrun" Ignacio announced that the agency had run out of money and would be shutting down.

== Use in marketing ==
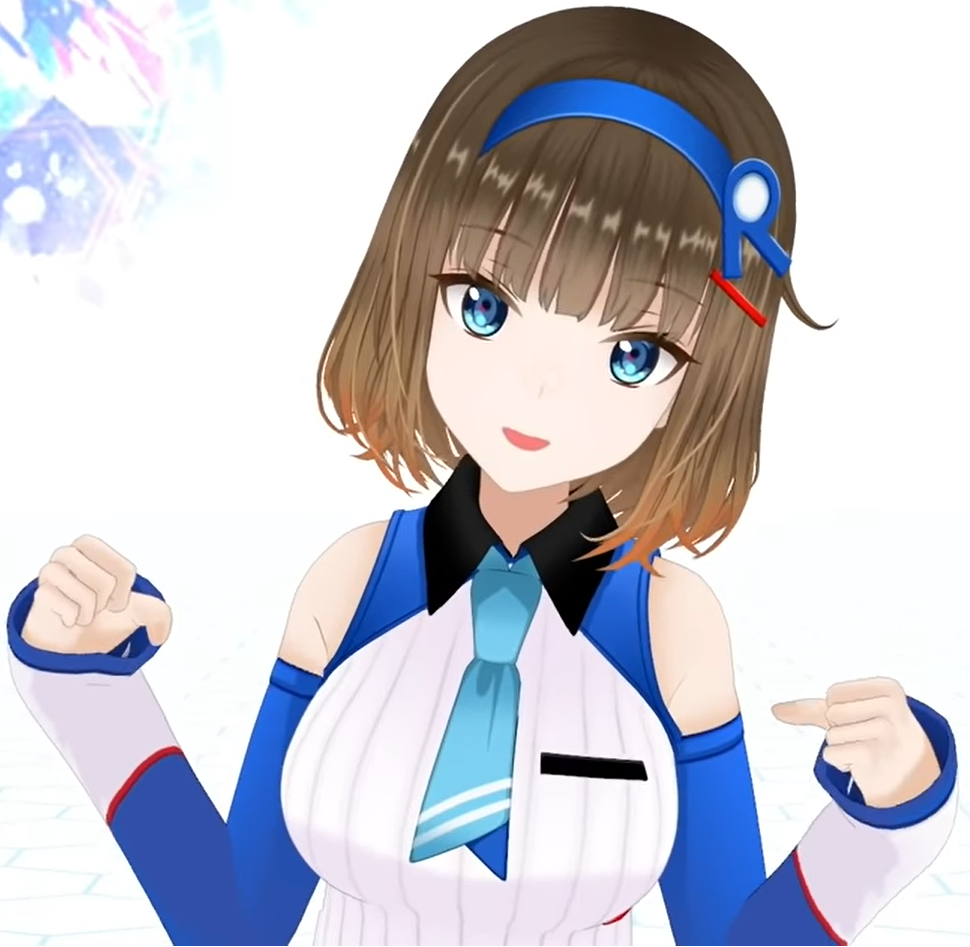
Nebasei Cocoro, a VTuber and representative for Japanese corporation Rohto Pharmaceutical

Due to their popularity, companies and organizations have used virtual YouTubers as a method of advertising or bringing attention to a product or service. When SoftBank announced the release of the iPhone XS and XS Max in 2018, Kizuna AI appeared at the event and promoted the products on her channel.

Some organizations and companies have employed their own VTuber characters as mascots within marketing. These include the governments of Japan's Ibaraki and Okinawa Prefectures (promoted by the characters Ibaraki Hiyori and Ui Nema, respectively), the streaming service Netflix (which developed the character N-ko to appear in videos promoting its anime content), Sega (who planned to have in-character streams with Sonic the Hedgehog and his Japanese voice actor Jun'ichi Kanemaru), and anime streaming service Crunchyroll (which launched a YouTube channel for its mascot Crunchyroll-Hime in October 2021). The Fukuoka SoftBank Hawks baseball team has two VTuber mascots, named Takamine Umi (also known as Hawk Kannon Sea) and Aritaka Hina, both unveiled in 2020. They have their own YouTube channel and their own Twitter accounts. Occasionally, they make appearances on the Fukuoka PayPay Dome's videoboard.

In August 2018, Wright Flyer Live Entertainment released a mobile application allowing VTubers to live stream videos while monetizing them and connecting with their viewers. In a news conference in Tokyo, the head of Wright Flyer Live Entertainment stated, "just increasing the number [of VTubers] is not that effective. We want them to keep on doing their activities. [To do that], gaining fans and monetization are essential. So, we are providing a platform to support that". This followed Wright Flyer Live Entertainment's parent company Gree, Inc.'s ¥10 billion ($89.35 million) investment in VTubers, as well as a ¥10 billion sales target by 2020.

On June 24, 2019, VTuber Kaguya Luna, in collaboration with Nissin Foods to advertise its Yakisoba UFO noodles, held a live stream with a smartphone attached to a helium balloon. By the end of the stream, the smartphone reached an altitude of 30 kilometres (19 mi) above sea level and was noted by Guinness World Records as being the live stream recorded at the highest altitude, breaking the previous record of 18.42 kilometres (11.45 mi).

Good Smile Company has begun producing nendoroids of Kizuna Ai in 2018, with a full push for various Japanese and international VTuber PVC-made statues since the 2020s.

In 2020, Japanese VTubers Ayapan and Jajami were invited by the Brazilian embassy in Tokyo, in November to present their content made for the Brazilian public and how VTuber works, where they had a meeting with Ambassador Eduardo Paes Saboia, being the first contact of VTubers with a Brazilian authority.

In 2021, Hololive English member Gawr Gura made a cameo appearance in an anime-themed ad by American fast food chain Taco Bell (which premiered to coincide with the 2020 Summer Olympics in Tokyo).

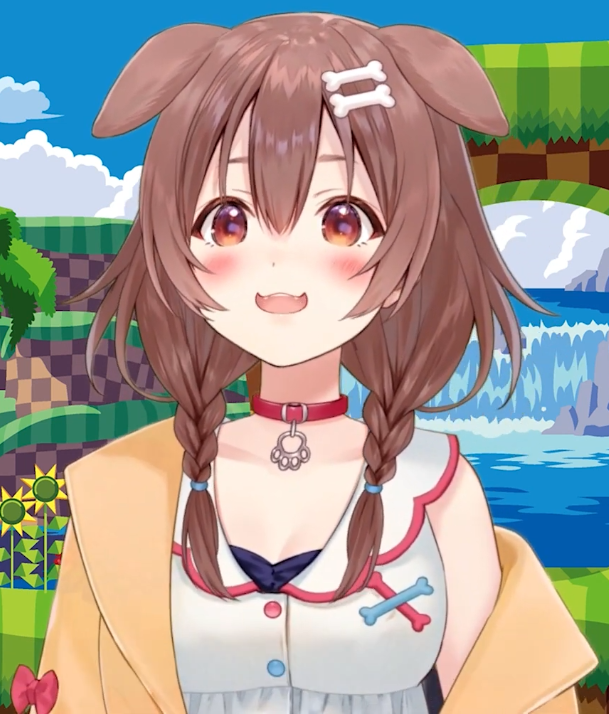
Inugami Korone has been the official brand ambassador for Sonic the Hedgehog in Japan since 2022

In June 2022, Hololive member Inugami Korone became the official brand ambassador for the Sonic the Hedgehog franchise in Japan. She would later appear in the Sonic the Hedgehog 2 film as the voice actress for one of the characters in the Japanese dub, and Korone-themed cosmetic items were released for Sonic Frontiers. She also made a cameo appearance in an episode of Yo-kai Watch that aired in March 2023.

In November 2023, Arashi member Kazunari Ninomiya, who's been working with Puzzle & Dragons since 2014 (with Arashi, and from 2021 as himself), became a VTuber for the latest CM campaign.

Ironmouse has served as an ambassador for the Immune Deficiency Foundation, having spread awareness for her own common variable immunodeficiency (CVID) and hosting multiple charity marathons in support of the organization.

In July 2024, the Los Angeles Dodgers collaborated with Hololive on a theme night, which featured appearances by Usada Pekora, Gawr Gura, and Hoshimachi Suisei, as well as limited-edition merchandise. The collaboration was Hololive's first with a professional sports team in the United States, and was one of several held with Japanese properties by the Dodgers that season to build upon its signing of Shohei Ohtani. In October 2024, streamer Sykkuno participated in a virtual campaign event by 2024 United States presidential election candidate Kamala Harris with Vermont senator Bernie Sanders (who, in a viral clip, was asked by Sykkuno if he knew what a VTuber was). On October 31, 2024, Hololive Indonesia member Kobo Kanaeru collaborated with Honda Indonesia to launch the first virtual motorcycle club in Indonesia named BeAT Aeru.

In March 2025, Simon Fraser University debuted its official VTuber mascots Mo and Faye Ayato, making them the world's first official university Vtubers. The virtual ambassadors would stream to review student work from the university's School of Interactive Arts and Technology.

== Portrayals in media ==
The 2020 light novel VTuber Legend: How I Went Viral After Forgetting to Turn Off My Stream follows a member of a fictitious VTuber agency who experiences a surge in popularity after a stream she accidentally conducts while drunk goes viral. The story was adapted into a manga in 2023, and then an anime in 2024.

A 2026 episode of the 27th season of American crime drama Law & Order: Special Victims Unit featured a plot in which the NYPD Special Victims Unit investigated the sexual assault of internet personality April Deieso (Sarah Desjardins), which she had publicized while streaming as the VTuber Jaded_Ember; the episode was notably praised by viewers for its accuracy in portraying VTubers, including the involvement of two community artists commissioned to design the character and Live2D model for Jaded_Ember.

== See also ==
- Aniforms – Interactive real-time character animation process
- Avatar (computing) – Graphical representation of a user or a user's alter ego or character
- Babiniku – Japanese term for male VTubers with female avatars
- Content creation – Contribution of information to any media
- Influencer – Person influential on social media
- Internet celebrity – Person who has become famous through their use of the Internet
- Japanese idol – Type of entertainer
- Japanese popular culture
- Online streamer – Social media poster who broadcasts live
- Replicant – Fictional bioengineered android from Blade Runner
- Video gaming in Japan – Japan's video game industry
- Virtual actor – (Re-)creation of a human being in image and voice
- Virtual character – Computer simulation of a person (for other virtual personality concepts)
- Virtual idol – Real musical group with fictional members
- Virtual influencer – Computer generated character used for social media marketing
- VRChat – Virtual reality social platform
- Vtuber Awards – Annual awards presented to VTubers
- Waifu – Fictional character that one feels attraction to

== Sources ==
- Otmazgin, Nissim; Ben-Ari, Eyal, eds. (April 23, 2020). Creative Context: Creativity and Innovation in the Media and Cultural Industries. Springer Singapore. ISBN 9789811530562. Archived from the original on March 28, 2023.
