= Aniforms =

Interactive real-time character animation process

An Aniform is a two-dimensional cartoon character operated like a puppet, to be displayed to live audiences or in visual media. The concept was invented by Morey Bunin with his spouse Charlotte, Bunin being a puppeteer who had worked with string marionettes and hand puppets. The distinctive feature of an Aniforms character is that it displays a physical form that appears "animated" on a real or simulated television screen. The technique was used in television production.

== Patent history ==
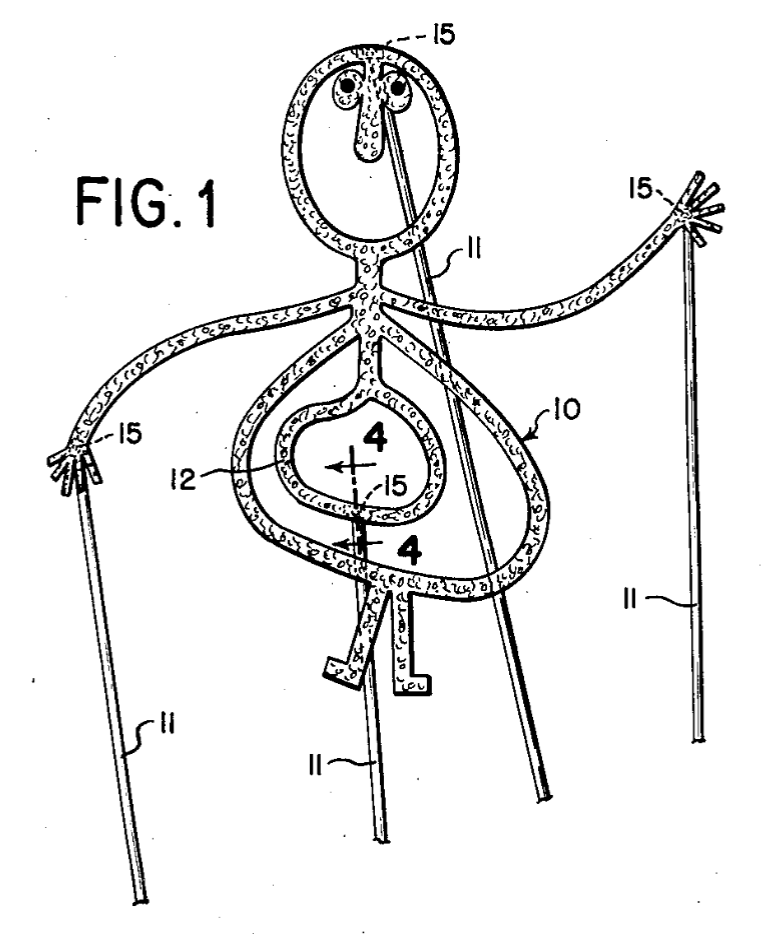
Example Aniform figure from Bunin's patent

After forming Aniforms, Inc., Bunin filed for a patent on the process on August 4, 1960, and was granted U.S. Patent 3,070,920 on January 1, 1963.

According to the patent, Aniforms are "open two-dimensional figures…constructed to simulate many objects." The figures are flexible to allow free manipulation, which is accomplished by "rods or wires … attached to the figures" for both support and movement. The controls are arranged or painted to be invisible to the audience.

Bunin later improved the process to take advantage of emerging Chroma key technology. All background and control surfaces were painted blue, and the black-white signal polarity was reversed without altering the color signals. This resulted in a black outline figure on a white background, which could then be superimposed or keyed on another scene without the object background showing through. Bunin filed for a patent on the improved process on January 20, 1975, and was granted U.S. Patent 3,899,848 on August 19, 1975.

== Application in television production ==
The Aniforms process has been used on several television productions:

- Captain Kangaroo for the character of "Fred," who appeared on the fictional "Channel One" for conversations with The Captain and other human characters. Fred was performed and voiced by Cosmo Allegretti.
- The Surprise Show, a children's program that was broadcast by WPIX-TV, New York City, from 1965 to 1967. The program featured Aniforms during its first season, but station executives dropped the concept for the run of the show because of the expense. The characters were voiced by Wayland Flowers, Cleavon Little, and Jimmy Boyd.
- Acilion et sa bande, a French children's program produced and broadcast by TF1 from 1978 to 1980. The program featured Acilion an Aniform during two season, but station executives dropped the concept because of the expense.
- Barney's Army, a children's program produced and broadcast by WPTF-TV 28, Raleigh, North Carolina from 1979 to 1983. Aniforms, Inc. supplied the characters, which were operated and voiced by local actors. A production assistant, Tony Madejczyk, recalled that use of the puppets was subject to non-disclosure agreements, and that when the puppets were not in use "we had to drape a tarp over the puppet." Puppets could not be stored at the station when the show was out of production.
- Malcolm, a 1983 pilot for a game show co-hosted by Alex Trebek and an Aniforms character named Malcolm. The premise was that three contestants appearing in boxes on a screen alongside Malcolm were asked a question with a two-word answer by Trebek; the first two to "buzz in" had to supply the answer, collaboratively, in order. If they failed to do so correctly, Malcolm would offer the third contestant a clue. The pilot was commissioned by NBC, and the show was not picked up.

== Successors ==
"Fred" and other Aniforms characters are considered more puppet than animation. Their relatively crude, two-dimensional forms and lack of locomotion was appealing primarily because of the illusion of human interaction in real-time with an animated character.

The Late Show host Stephen Colbert and his production company, Spartina Productions, founded Late Night Cartoons, Inc., an animation studio that has collaborated with developers of Adobe Character Animator to produce and provide real-time interactive animations for broadcast. Their topical productions range from a live interview with an animated cartoon version of Donald Trump and Hillary Clinton in 2016 to several animated series including: Showtime's Our Cartoon President, Paramount+/Comedy Central’s Tooning Out the News, and Comedy Central’s Fairview. Another series, Washingtonia, was announced in October 2021 with a trailer using the process but has not been produced or aired as of 2024.

The Adobe Character Animator technology uses motion capture to track hand-drawn characters in real-time. In contrast to Aniforms, which requires only a puppeteer and an optional voice artist, it takes "25 to 30 animators total" to produce a 10-minute episode in the 24-hour turnaround cycle required before airtime for the concept to stay current.

CrazyTalk and CrazyTalk Animator were used by Network studios in their daily production due to short delivery deadlines and used by television shows like Jimmy Kimmel LIVE! to produce real-time animations for broadcast.

Live2D also can be used to generate real-time 2D animations—usually anime-style characters—using layered, continuous parts based on an illustration, without the need of frame-by-frame animation or a 3D model. This enables characters to move using 2.5D movement while maintaining the original illustration.

== See also ==
- Avatar (computing)
- Character animation
- Computer facial animation
- Digital puppetry
- Facial motion capture
- Live2D
- Virtual newscaster
- Virtual YouTuber
