= Keep On Truckin' (TV series) =

- Directed by: Tony Mordente
- Starring: See Regulars
- Composer: Marvin Laird
- Country of origin: United States
- Original language: English
- No. of seasons: 1
- No. of episodes: 4

Production
- Producers: John Aylesworth; Frank Peppiatt
- Running time: 60 min

Original release
- Network: ABC
- Release: July 12 – August 2, 1975

Keep On Truckin' is an American comedy/variety series that aired on American Broadcasting Company from July 12, 1975, to August 2, 1975. Each episode was to have been introduced by Rod Serling, but he died of a heart attack two weeks before the series premiere and his pre-taped introductions were omitted from the telecasts.

== Regulars ==
- Franklyn Ajaye
- Rhonda Bates
- Dick Van Dyke
- Kathrine Baumann
- Jannine Burnier
- Scott Baio
- Didi Conn
- Charles Fleischer
- Anson Williams
- Wayland Flowers
- Mike Lookinland
- Larry Ragland (actor)
- Marion Ramsey
- Ted McGinley
- Rhilo Fahir
- Jack Riley
- Fred Travalena
- Gailard Sartain
- Richard Lee Sung
