= The Beatrice Arthur Special =

- Written by: Hal Goldman; Saul Ilson; Jeffrey Barron
- Directed by: Jeff Margolis; Howard Morris
- Presented by: Beatrice Arthur
- Starring: Beatrice Arthur; Rock Hudson; Melba Moore; Wayland Flowers & Madame
- Music by: Bob Rozario
- Country of origin: United States
- Original language: English

Production
- Producer: Saul Ilson
- Editor: Andy Zall
- Running time: 60 minutes
- Production company: Saul Ilson Productions

Original release
- Network: CBS
- Release: January 19, 1980

The Beatrice Arthur Special is a 1980 American comedy-variety television special hosted by and starring Beatrice Arthur in her first and only prime time special. It was originally broadcast as a "CBS Special Presentation" on January 19, 1980 at 10:00 pm ET/PT.

== Overview ==
Arthur, along with guest stars Rock Hudson, Melba Moore, Wayland Flowers and his puppet character Madame, perform a series of skits and musical numbers, many of which have a distinct Broadway sensibility (two numbers from I Love My Wife, a musical that Arthur's ex-husband Gene Saks had directed, were among the selections). The special was recorded using a single-camera setup without a studio audience, with a laugh track added in post-production.

== Featured songs and skits ==
- "If I Could Be with You (One Hour Tonight)" (Arthur)
- "Hey There, Good Times" (All)
- Arthur, appearing beside herself with chroma key effects, illustrates network efforts to make her dress like Carol Burnett, Dolly Parton or Cher
- A comic dialogue between Arthur and Madame, including the song "A Good Man is Hard to Find"
- The Harry Fenwick Funeral—Fenwick's widow Gloria (Arthur) meets two of his three mistresses, Marsha and Ruthie, who are all surprised to find he also had a gay lover (in an afterthought, Arthur notes that this would be the most risqué sketch of the night)
- Arthur goes over frequently asked questions, segueing into "How Long Has This Been Going On?" (Arthur)
- "Everybody Today is Turning On" (Arthur and Hudson)
- A reporter (David Sheehan) visits Steve Martin's parents (Arthur and Conrad Bain)
- A medley from Ain't Misbehavin' (Arthur and Moore)
  - "I'm Gonna Sit Right Down and Write Myself a Letter"
  - "Ain’t Misbehavin'"
  - "'T Ain't Nobody's Bizness"
- Edie and Judd's Second Honeymoon, a dramedy sketch in which a burnt-out couple (Arthur and Hudson) celebrates their 30th anniversary
- "Old-Time Religion"/"Saved" – Arthur plays charismatic evangelist Sister Love, with Hudson and Moore as testimonials and Madame as the keyboardist
- Finale: "The Way I See It" (Arthur)

The Paley Center for Media copy of the program includes Moore singing "Miss Thing"; the song was cut from the CBS broadcast.

== Reception ==
The special was nominated for an Emmy for Outstanding Costume Design at the 32nd Primetime Emmy Awards, but lost to NBC's This Year's Blonde.

A retrospective review by Phil Hall at Film Threat's "The Bootleg Files" cited Moore's performances as the highlight of the special, also noting that Flowers's segments provided some of the few moments of "genuine fun" in the show. Hall conceded he was not a fan of Arthur's voice or style and felt that Moore seemed out of place with Arthur, the openly gay Flowers and the closeted Hudson. In all, Hall concluded that the awkward mix of mostly unfunny comedy (citing the Martin sketch as a lowlight) with dramedy, poor choreography, and miscasting of camp icons like Hudson in straight roles made the special so bad, it's good.
