= Madame's Place =

American TV series

- Stage placard for Madame's Place talk show
- Genre: Sitcom
- Directed by: Don Barnhart; Paul Miller
- Starring: Wayland Flowers; Susan Tolsky; Johnny Haymer; Judy Landers; Corey Feldman
- Theme music composer: Michael K. Miller; Monica Riordan
- Opening theme: "Madame's Place" performed by Denise De Caro
- Composers: Dan Foliart; Howard Pearl
- Country of origin: United States
- Original language: English
- No. of seasons: 1
- No. of episodes: 74 (plus unaired pilot)

Production
- Executive producer: Brad Lachman
- Producers: Don Van Atta; Bob Sand
- Editors: Joe Bella; Ken Denisoff
- Camera setup: Multi-camera
- Running time: 22–24 minutes
- Production companies: Brad Lachman Productions; Madame, Inc.

Original release
- Network: Syndication
- Release: September 20, 1982 – February 25, 1983

Madame's Place is an American sitcom based on the ribald, acerbic, aging-celebrity diva Madame, a puppet character portrayed by Wayland Flowers. A single season of 74 episodes was produced for first-run syndication, originally broadcast from September 1982 to February 1983. Initial syndication of weekday airings also featured hourlong composites created for weekend broadcasts. With broad humor based on double entendres, sharp comebacks, and her penchant for celebrity name-dropping, the character of Madame was often attired in gowns and jewels, a parody of the opulence associated with Hollywood's Golden era.

== Premise ==
Madame lives in a plush Hollywood mansion surrounded by butler Pinkerton, secretary Bernadette, and niece Sara Joy. The domestic comedy antics are supplemented by the Madame's Place talk show within-the-show, a revolving door for stand-up comedy, variety performers, and celebrity guests.

The series opens with Madame successfully negotiating a revival of the popular talk show broadcast from her home studio, convinced by the fans tired of watching reruns. While many episode plots stand alone, the show sometimes employs a serialized format, with storylines spanning multiple episodes, and routine recaps of earlier events.

The series makes repeated mentions of Madame writing her autobiography. Nine months after the show ended its run, Flowers published Madame: My Misbegotten Memoirs, a book delving into Madame's backstory, without reflecting on the television series or its characters.

== Cast and characters ==
=== Principal ===
- Wayland Flowers as Madame – Madame has enjoyed a storied career in stage, radio, film, and television. She resides in a lavish Beverly Hills mansion, where she hosts a late-night talk show. Despite her age, Madame exudes childlike behavior, shamelessly pursuing younger men and often greeting female peers with verbal barbs.
- Johnny Haymer as Walter Pinkerton – "Pinky," as he is affectionately called by the staff, is a former boxer, stunt man, and stand-in. He met Madame on the set of the 1957 film Gone with the Milkman while standing in for her costar, and the two carried on a torrid affair behind the back of Madame's then-husband. When Pinky fell on hard times, Madame hired him as her butler. Their deep friendship prevails, although Pinky grapples with his role as a butler in his 50s and stifles feelings of jealousy towards the various men who frequent Madame's bed.
- Susan Tolsky as Bernadette Van Gilder - Bernie initially came to Hollywood with dreams of becoming an actress. However, she encountered the unsavory aspects of the industry and opted for a more conservative path as Madame's secretary. Bernie manages administrative tasks, answers phone calls, and ensures the household runs smoothly. She carries the weight of her husband Bart's tragic death in 1962, as he choked on a dove during a magic show.
- Judy Landers as Sara Joy Pitts – Sara Joy, the naive and curvaceous daughter of Madame's sister, fled her unhappy life in Georgia to seek fame in Hollywood. Her Auntie Madame extended her protection and guidance. Sara Joy aspires to be an actress and often showcases her gymnastic abilities.

=== Recurring ===
- Corey Feldman as Buzzy St. James – Buzzy is the snarky 11-year-old son of a pretentious writer and actress who are seldom home, leaving the boy to run amuck. His hobby is taxidermy, he is a super-fan of Madame's, he gleans delight from annoying Bernadette, and has a not-so-secret crush on Sara Joy.
- Ty Henderson as Barney Wolfe – Barney is the producer and director of Madame's talk show, who's frequently exasperated because she does whatever she pleases.
- Edie McClurg as Solaria – Solaria is an eccentric psychic medium who shares her bed with an extensive family of felines. Despite her peculiarities, Solaria possesses uncanny psychic abilities, as well as supernatural gifts that she unleashes on those who cross her.
- Don Sparks as Mister Honest – Eric Honest is Madame's most frequent TV guest, a send up of Mister Rogers. He is known for his unwavering commitment to telling the unvarnished truth, regardless of how inappropriate it may be. In an early episode, he sings about his disdain for his wealthy wife, but his marriage is later disregarded.
- John Moschitta Jr. as Larry Lunch – Larry is Madame's fast-talking and unscrupulous agent, who communicates in rapid double-talk, firing off a million words per minute.
- Chandler Garrison as R. Ray Randall – "No face," as he is referred to by Madame, is the sinister, disembodied voice of the TV network owner.
- Hector Elias as Roland Esperanza – Although he is seldom seen, Roland is generally announced at the top of Madame's talk show. He is a widower bandleader who conducts "the middle-aged sounds of Madame's All-Divorced Orchestra."

=== Featured ===
Guests were frequent and ranged widely, often appearing as themselves; notables include Peggy Gilbert, Debbie Reynolds, Betty White, Phyllis Diller, Tab Hunter, William Shatner, Charles Nelson Reilly, Rip Taylor, Charles Pierce, Frankie Avalon, Marty Allen, Foster Brooks, Paul Reubens (as Pee-wee Herman), Alice Ghostley, Scatman Crothers, John Schneider, Robert Culp, Jay Leno, and Arsenio Hall, as well as various members of The Groundlings comedy troupe, who appeared as an assortment of characters and provided stand-up comedy bits.

== Development ==
Wayland Flowers and Madame had become regular fixtures on talk shows, variety programs, and game shows in the mid-1970s, notably holding the center square on the popular Hollywood Squares. In 1980 Madame began a recurring gig as a guest on Solid Gold, produced by Brad Lachman as a weekly series featuring countdowns of the top Billboard hits, musical performances, and dancing galore. Madame was extremely popular with the youth market, and soon Wayland Flowers began devising ideas for her own show. His initial concept involved Madame launching into space on a rocket at the start of each episode, followed by her unexpected appearances in various TV shows. However, this idea proved to be impractical. He then proposed a scenario in which he would share a mansion with Madame, but this was shot down by the producers because Flowers was no ventriloquist, visibly voicing Madame.

Ultimately, a pilot was produced and made available to the press and distributors in January 1982. This pilot featured the diminutive Patty Maloney as Madame's secretary, Alan Young as her English butler, and included additional puppets like Jiffy, Crazy Mary, Mr. Mackelroy, and Baby Smedley in supporting roles. Although the pilot was instrumental in pitching the show, Paramount believed that the inclusion of all these puppets made it appear "too cartoonish". Consequently, it was decided that the show would be more distinctive with Madame as the sole puppet star.

== Production ==
Brad Lachman Productions commenced work on Madame's Place in August 1982, at the KTLA studio. with the cast and crew working at a breakneck pace to create 74 half-hour episodes within 26 weeks. They had already produced 30 episodes before the show's September debut. It was touted as the most expensive comedy ever produced for syndication, costing $250,000 per week (adjusted for inflation, nearly $800,000) for five 30-minute episodes and one hour-long recap. The show was shot without a studio audience, necessitating the use of a laugh track. Flowers expressed his preference for having an audience, remarking that it was the one thing he disliked about the TV show. "I'm used to hearing the laughter, only now it's not there."

A team of 12 writers collaborated to develop the show's stories and bounced around ideas in the room. Flowers, who had an intimate understanding of the Madame character, often revised her dialogue, noting, "There's a way to deliver a line for Madame. I call it putting a button on it. And I'm good at buttoning up." At times, Flowers would improvise new lines during filming, and the script would be swiftly adjusted on the teleprompter.

The show featured one primary Madame puppet and nine "stand-ins" each painted with slight variations, including one intentionally made to appear evil. Flowers could distinguish between the puppets and switched them as needed for different scenes. Together with costume designer Minta Manning, he scoured magazines for wardrobe ideas for the dolls, resulting in a collection of over 100 custom outfits.

To prevent erecting scaffolding sets for the puppeteer as they did on The Muppet Show, Flowers devised a small black vinyl stool with six wheels. This allowed him to roll around the set, propelling himself with his legs while holding the puppet over his head. This innovative approach enabled a recurring gag in which Madame would be sent flying across the room after getting smacked, punched, or blown by a hairdryer. However, it caused issues for some of the guest stars, who found it challenging to focus on Madame instead of looking down at Wayland. Co-star Judy Landers remarked that "After the initial shock, you begin to feel she's not a puppet anymore. She becomes a whole person because Wayland Flowers is so talented." For scenes set in the bedroom and bathtub, Flowers had to manipulate Madame's movements through a crevice while watching one monitor and tracking the script on a separate teleprompter. "You have to be a contortionist," he remarked.

Corey Feldman recalled being enamored by both Wayland and Madame, so Flowers borrowed a plush monkey from the boy and fitted it with rods so he could puppeteer it. Feldman was thrilled, but his mother was unimpressed, telling him, "Wayland Flowers is gay." The boy wasn't even sure what "gay" meant. Feldman was eventually dropped from the show due to the studio's concerns that the material was too risqué for a child actor.

Judy Landers' agent encouraged her to stick to dramatic roles, but she had a preference for comedic parts and eagerly accepted the opportunity to co-star in the series. Her character, Sara Joy, incorporated her real-life passion for gymnastics, which she had pursued since the age of 9 and excelled in by winning the New York state championships at 16. To maintain her fitness during filming, she adhered to a low-carb, high-protein diet. Landers addressed her portrayal of the ditsy character, explaining, "We're both extremely determined and ambitious, [but] I'm a very serious-mind person. I can be silly and that's what I do for Sara Joy. I take that silly side of myself and just extend on it." She also responded to critics who questioned her repeated portrayals of dumb characters in sitcoms by stating, "I think laughter is God's hand on the shoulder of a troubled world."

The demanding five-day-a-week shooting schedule began to take its toll on Flowers, leading to strain on his voice, which he described as making him "sound like a frog". He expressed regret about committing to a daily show," describing the set as chaotic and even referring to it as "Casa Tastrophe". In addition to the weekday shoots, Madame retained her regular gig on Solid Gold, which was shot every two weeks over the course of four days. There have been allegations that Flowers developed a significant cocaine habit during production in an effort to cope with the demanding pace. In an interview on the set of Madame's Place, Armistead Maupin commented on Flowers's noticeable weight loss, and during the same interview, "Madame" made a humorous remark about Hollywood's rampant drug issue, stating, "I never do cocaine. I don't want to get that close to a mirror."

== Theme song ==
Michael K. Miller of Solid Gold composed the theme song, with lyrics by Monica Riordan, and assistance from Alan Satchwell:

An initial attempt to record George Burns and Ethel Merman performing the song proved unsuccessful.

Paramount raised concerns that the lyrics would offend older viewers, so the first verse was revised. The unused original lyrics were:

They say that she's a geriatric wonder
With an ever-active hunger for a thrill
When a young man looks at Madame
She just throws herself right at 'em
She's young at heart and not yet over the hill.

== Release ==
Intended for late-night broadcasts aimed at adults in the 18-49 range, the show secured deals in 110 markets, making it the largest sale for a first-run syndicated show up to that point, reaching 83% of households in the USA. In addition to the standard 30-minute episodes, Paramount also created hour-long compilations of the week's shows for stations to broadcast on the weekends.

Madame's Place was a huge hit in Atlanta, where the hour-long Saturday edition topped the ratings for WATL, but many stations only licensed the hour-long version, weekday distributors complained that inexpensive reruns of The Twilight Zone pulled in higher ratings, and it was dealt a death-blow when New York's WWOR-TV and another major RKO network decided to drop it from their schedule. The cost of maintaining the five-shows-a-week pace became unsustainable when a significant portion of the country wasn't even airing the episodes, leading to the show's cancellation in January 1983.

The show went on to be rerun on the USA Network from 1986 to 1991, alternating between daytime and late-night timeslots. Throughout 1999, episodes infrequently aired on TV Land. In the UK, it aired on The Paramount Channel from 1995–1996.

== Reception ==
The show received generally positive reviews. TV Host's Wayne Miller gushed that "the show is not only original, but more often than not, it's downright funny." He continued, "The supporting cast sparkles as an ensemble foil to the luscivious [sic] Madame." Tom Hopkins of the Dayton Daily News stated, "It's funny stuff, with some sharp writing and some skillful work by Flowers. At a time when TV is mired in spinoffs and regrinds, Madame's Place is a bright new concept." Bob Curtright of The Witchita Eagle-Beacon noted, "The talk-show format allows numerous guest celebrities, giving it the feel of The Muppet Show. The home front provides the kookiness of Soap. The combination is hilarious, but obviously not for everyone." Michael Dougan of the San Francisco Examiner dubbed it "the randiest show on commercial television," concluding, "I know a lot of people do find Madame funny and, to them only, Madame's Place comes recommended."

James Brown of the Los Angeles Times commented, "Liking this show depends on one's tolerance for the campy utterings of Wayland Flowers' sassy puppet, Madame. Since mine is extremely low, 'Madame's Place' is a long 30-minutes." He concluded, "As sitcoms go, 'Madame's Place' is probably no better or worse than, say, Joanie Loves Chachi. It's just that I have a hard time warming up to puppets. Even Kermit gives me the chills." Rick Malaspena of the Oakland Tribune called it "a harmless piece of camp," concluding, that "it's not always truly funny, and it might wear thin when the novelty fades."

== Episodes ==
There has been considerable confusion regarding the episode count, largely due to misinformation from the studio, compounded by the long unavailability of the show. Shortly after the series concluded, a multi-page Paramount trade ad in Television/Radio Age magazine stated there were "75 half-hours" available, a count that is accurate only if you include the unaired pilot. Later in the same issue, it mentions "150 half-hours" (the show was canceled halfway through the season, so it's probable that someone didn't get the memo), and this number continued to appear in trade magazines for over a year. Adding further to the confusion, a subsequent revision to the trade ads listed 93 shows, and fans have mistakenly presumed that the episodes that were uploaded to YouTube constitute the complete series.

Airdates are fairly consistent, but since the show was syndicated to independent stations, they varied. In some markets, it aired after midnight, while in others, the premiere was delayed by a week or more. American copyright records simply list the episodes by numbers. The titles below possibly originated in a German episode guide, but they're also utilized on IMDb.

| No. | Title | Directed by | Written by | Original release date |
|---|---|---|---|---|
| 0 | "Pilot" | N/A | N/A | Unaired |
Patty Maloney stars as Patty, Madame's pint-sized secretary, Alan Young is Ridgley, Madame's stuffy English butler, and Wayland Flowers' puppets Jiffy, Crazy Mary, and Mr. Mackelhoney costar. Note: A few images and some vague information about the pilot were released in an early trade ad, and a brief shot of the opening titles was featured in a story on Entertainment Tonight.
| 1 | "The Successful Comeback" | Paul Miller | Bob Sand, Tom Moore, Greg Fields, Frank Mula, Tony Garofalo, Bob Howard, Carter Crocker, George Atkins, Marc Warren, Dennis Rinsler | September 20, 1982 |
Madame revives her talk show; Sara Joy arrives and asks to stay.
| 2 | "This is Her Past" | Paul Miller | Bob Sand, Tony Garofalo, Greg Fields, Peggy Goldman | September 21, 1982 |
Sara Joy tries to find a job; Madame is surprised when she ends up stuck on a variation of This is Your Life hosted by Biff Willis (real-life game show host Geoff Edwards).
| 3 | "A Bath for Eddie" | Paul Miller | Bob Sand, Bob Howard, Tony Garofalo, Greg Fields, Tom Moore, | September 22, 1982 |
Madame decides to throw herself at a boy she used to babysit, unaware that he has grown to become a televangelist.
| 4 | "Pinky's Diary" | Paul Miller | Bob Sand, Carter Crocker, Tony Garofalo, Greg Fields, Tom Moore, Bob Howard | September 23, 1982 |
Buzzy and Sara Joy submit Pinkerton's steamy diary for publication. Bernadette and Madame spar when Bernie books a ladies' marching band on the show.
| 5 | "The Big Cage" | Paul Miller | Bob Sand, George Atkins, Tom Moore, Tony Garofalo | September 24, 1982 |
After the mansion is robbed, Madame has a cheap security system installed to trap intruders, but she is the one who ends up caged.
| 6 | "Not Even in a Dream" | Paul Miller | Bob Sand, Bob Howard, Marc Warren, Dennis Rinsler, Peggy Goldman, Tony Garofalo, Greg Fields, Wayland Flowers | September 27, 1982 |
Madame has nightmares after Solaria tells her that she is going to have a baby, and then a bundle of joy turns up on the doorstep.
| 7 | "Movie Stars and Producers" | Paul Miller | Bob Sand, Tom Moore, Tony Garofalo, George Atkins, Peggy Goldman, Greg Fields, Marc Warren, Dennis Rinsler, Wayland Flowers | September 28, 1982 |
Desperate to raise money to care for the baby that she admits she put on the doorstep, Sara Joy unwittingly signs a contract to star in a porno; Debbie Reynolds appears on the show and does an impersonation of Madame. Note: Debbie Reynolds' friendship with Wayland Flowers pre-dated his fame, and his associates created the mask and gown, which she sometimes used in her live act.
| 8 | "One Catastrophe Follows the Other" | Paul Miller | Bob Sand, George Atkins, Greg Fields, Peggy Goldman, Tom Moore, Marc Warren, Dennis Rinsler, Wayland Flowers | September 29, 1982 |
Solaria holds a seance, a plane crashes into the mansion, Bernadette quits, and Madame learns that Sara Joy isn't actually the baby's mother.
| 9 | "Naked All-Star Bowling Competition" | Paul Miller | Bob Sand, Tony Garofalo, Marc Warren, Dennis Rinsler, Tom Moore, Greg Fields, Wayland Flowers | September 30, 1982 |
Madame becomes desperate to lure Bernie away from her nemesis, host of a naked bowling show. Also, the baby's real mother returns to Georgia, and Lynne Marie Stewart appears as a politically-incorrect Japanese impressionist.
| 10 | "Intimate and Embarrassing" | Paul Miller | Bob Sand, Tony Garafalo, Bob Howard, Tom Moore, Peggy Goldman, Wayland Flowers | October 1, 1982 |
Madame is under the weather and Bernadette can't find a celebrity to guest host, so she takes on the duty, embarrassing both herself and a US senator in the process.
| 11 | "Buzzy's Puberty" | Paul Miller | Bob Sand, George Atkins, Tony Garofalo, Tom Moore, Bob Howard, Wayland Flowers | October 4, 1982 |
After Buzzy comes on the Sara Joy, Madame talks to his parents, and then Buzzy vanishes. Also, actor/composer Anthony Newley appears on the show and duets his hit The Candy Man with Madame.
| 12 | "A Divine Diva" | Paul Miller | Bob Sand, Tom Moore, Dennis Rinsler, Marc Warren, Greg Fields, Tony Garofalo, Bob Howard, Frank Mula, Wayland Flowers | October 5, 1982 |
When Cora Flarp (Monica Ganas), a homeless woman who won the lottery, moves into the mansion next door, Madame decides to give her a makeover. Also, Bette Midler seems to appear on the show, but Madame ultimately reveals that it's impersonator Kenny Sacha. Note: Sacha not only appeared in Midler's movie The Rose, but he impersonated her again in a 1984 episode of Simon & Simon titled "Double Play".
| 13 | "The Blushing Bride" | Paul Miller | Bob Sand, Marc Warren, Dennis Rinsler, Bob Howard, Tom Moore, Tony Garofalo, Carter Crocker, George Atkins, Wayland Flowers | October 6, 1982 |
Madame decides to hold a contest to choose her next husband, and the finalists are a hunky podiatrist Dr. Carl Treadwell (Raymond Lynch) and a dorky Dwayne Kellogg (William Bogert). Also, Charles Nelson Reilly appears on the show and won't stop running his mouth.
| 14 | "In Love, Engaged, Crazy" | Paul Miller | Bob Sand, Marc Warren, Dennis Rinsler, Peggy Goldman, Tony Garofalo, Tom Moore, Bob Howard, Frank Mula, Wayland Flowers | October 7, 1982 |
Dwayne puts the moves on Bernadette, Madame's 4th ex-husband (Stuart Nisbet) comes to town for a convention of her exes and to warn her that Dwayne is a con-man, and Jay Leno appears on the show.
| 15 | "The Barbarian in the Boudoir" | Paul Miller | Bob Sand, Frank Mula, Tony Garofalo, Tom Moore, Bob Howard, Greg Fields, Marc Warren, Dennis Rinsler, Wayland Flowers | October 8, 1982 |
Bernadette's proof of Dwayne's intentions seems to be useless since he and Madame have gone to Mexico to elope. Mister Honest fills in as host on Madame's show and John Paragon guests.
| 16 | "The Prey of Madness" | Paul Miller | Bob Sand, Carter Crocker, Greg Fields, Frank Mula, Marc Warren, Dennis Rinsler, Tony Garofalo, Tom Moore, Bob Howard, Wayland Flowers | October 11, 1982 |
Bernadette gets Dr. Joyce Brothers to consult with Madame after her failed engagement. Also, Fred Willard guests on Madame's show and tries to get Sara Joy to prepare him a meal.
| 17 | "Duck Good, All Good" | Paul Miller | Bob Sand, Frank Mula, Tony Garofalo, Tom Moore, George Atkins, Carter Crocker, Bob Howard, Marc Warren, Dennis Rinsler, Greg Fields, Wayland Flowers | October 12, 1982 |
Madame's gone quacking mad, Pinkerton confesses his feelings for her, Dr. Joyce Brothers appears on Madame's show, and Dale Gonyea extols his love for pianos.
| 18 | "Who Laughs Last?" | Paul Miller | Bob Sand, George Atkins, Tom Moore, Greg Fields, Bob Howard, Tony Garofalo, Carter Crocker, Marc Warren, Dennis Rinsler, Frank Mula, Wayland Flowers | October 13, 1982 |
Madame ignores Bernadette's advice and appears on Star Probe, then is surprised when they do a smear piece. Also a drunken Foster Brooks interrupts Madame's show, and comedian Brian Seff performs a song.
| 19 | "I Am What I Am" | Paul Miller | Bob Sand, Marc Warren, Dennis Rinsler, Frank Mula, Tom Moore, Bob Howard, Greg Fields, Tony Garofalo, George Atkins, Wayland Flowers | October 14, 1982 |
When Italian director Federino Felluci (Ronnie Schell) asks Madame to appear in his new movie, she assumes he wants her to play the lead. Betty White appears on the show and verbally spars with Madame.
| 20 | "Come Fly with Me" | Paul Miller | Bob Sand, Frank Mula, Tony Garofalo, Tom Moore, Greg Fields, Bob Howard, Marc Warren, Dennis Rinsler, George Atkins, Wayland Flowers | October 15, 1982 |
Madame has a senior moment when Tab Hunter appears on her show. A mentally ill fan (Archie Hahn) breaks into the mansion posing as the grocery delivery boy.
| 21 | "The Golden Mousetrap" | Paul Miller | Bob Sand, Bob Howard, Tom Moore, Tony Garofalo, Greg Fields, Wayland Flowers | October 18, 1982 |
A condescending neighbor (Ruth Gillette) starts a petition to prohibit Madame from broadcasting her show from the mansion. The deciding vote comes down to a dorky inventor (Gary Allen), so Madame goes out of her way to befriend him. Mickey Jones appears as Madame's biker buddy.
| 22 | "Barbra Streisand's Nose" | Paul Miller | Bob Sand, Tony Garofalo, Peggy Goldman, Mar Warren, Dennis Rinsler, Bob Howard, Greg Fields, Wayland Flowers | October 19, 1982 |
Madame recalls her younger days and thinks she has lost touch with the youth market, so she teams up with a punk band called Drool. Note: The episode title is the name of the song that Madame performs, a parody of "Bette Davis Eyes", the popular Kim Carnes single.
| 23 | "The Caviar Poisoning" | Don Barnhart | Bob Sand, Tom Moore, Tony Garofalo, Greg Fields, Wayland Flowers | October 20, 1982 |
Madame schedules plastic surgery and uses a rash of food poisonings as a cover story for her recuperation. Pinkerton knows the truth, but everyone else thinks she is at death's door.
| 24 | "Hypnosis is Fun" | Don Barnhart | Bob Sand, George Atkins, Tony Garofalo, Tom Moore, Greg Fields, Bob Howard, Wayland Flowers | October 21, 1982 |
Solaria hypnotizes Madame to deal with a bout of insomnia, which causes Madame to behave erratically whenever anyone snaps their fingers.
| 25 | "Other People's Garbage" | Don Barnhart | Bob Sand, Carter Crocker, Greg Fields, Peggy Goldman, Marc Warren, Dennis Rinsler, Tom Moore, George Atkins, Tony Garofalo, Bob Howard, Wayland Flowers | October 22, 1982 |
Barney is replaced by Tony Tessier (Robert Hanley), a sleazy TV producer.
| 26 | "My Best Friend" | Paul Miller | Bob Sand, Marc Warren, Dennis Rinsler, Greg Fields, Wayland Flowers | October 25, 1982 |
When Madame's old friend Bobbie Tremain comes for a visit, everyone grows concerned that she is a freeloader. Also, Madame interviews Toni Tennille but can't stop asking questions about her husband.
| 27 | "But Please, No Jokes" | Paul Miller | Bob Sand, Tom Moore, Tony Garofalo, Bob Howard, Marc Warren, Dennis Rinsler, Greg Fields, Wayland Flowers | October 26, 1982 |
Sara Joy spends her life's savings on a demo recording, which raises the ire of her Auntie Madame. Also, Madame can't help but crack jokes when Phyllis Diller appears on the show.
| 28 | "I Am the Star!" | Paul Miller | Bob Sand, Tony Garofalo, Marc Warren, Dennis Rinsler, Tom Moore, Greg Fields, Bob Howard, Wayland Flowers | October 27, 1982 |
Everyone knows that Madame is about to be honored as the Woman of the Year except the recipient herself, who jeopardizes the honor by getting arrested at Club Zooland.
| 29 | "Everyone Has Their Dream Role" | Paul Miller | Bob Sand, Frank Mula, Marc Warren, Dennis Rinsler, Carter Crocker, Greg Fields, Tony Garofalo, Wayland Flowers | October 28, 1982 |
Madame agrees to finance a show for Sara Joy and her pretentious new boyfriend (John Sanderford), which drives a wedge between the young lovers. Also, Eva Gabor appears on Madame's show and declares she wants to play the title role in a sequel to E.T. the Extra-Terrestrial.
| 30 | "Striptease Sensational" | Paul Miller | Bob Sand, George Atkins, Marc Warren, Dennis Rinsler, Tony Garofalo, Tom Moore, Bob Howard, Wayland Flowers | October 29, 1982 |
A freak snowstorm has prevented Madame's guests from arriving, forcing her friends to perform on the show.
| 31 | "My Lawyer, Please!" | Don Barnhart | Bob Sand, Frank Mula, Marc Warren, Dennis Rinsler, Tony Garofalo, Tom Moore, Bob Howard, Carter Crocker, Wayland Flowers | November 1, 1982 |
Madame is unconcerned when Tony Tessier files a wrongful termination suit against her, not realizing that Tessier is friends with the judge and her lawyer has lost his mind. Meanwhile, Sara Joy hopes to compete in the Olympics.
| 32 | "In Court on Friday" | Don Barnhart | Bob Sand, Frank Mula, Tony Garofalo, Greg Fields, Tom Moore, Marc Warren, Dennis Rinsler, Wayland Flowers | November 2, 1982 |
A lawyer states his intent to admit an old porn movie starring Madame into evidence. Sara Joy tries to boost the career of a street juggler.
| 33 | "Inga's Spicy Meatballs" | Don Barnhart | Bob Sand, Carter Crocker, Tony Garofalo, Tom Moore, Bob Howard, Wayland Flowers | November 3, 1982 |
Solaria provides a strange clue to help Madame in her trial, and Sara Joy takes the stand.
| 34 | "Naked Lou From Malibu" | Don Barnhart | Bob Sand, Bob Howard, Tony Garofalo, Tom Moore, Marc Warren, Dennis Rinsler, Wayland Flowers | November 4, 1982 |
To help Sara Joy get over the nude model she was dating, Solaria sets her up with her nephew, Pee-Wee Herman. Note: The announcer prophetically declares, "Future kiddie show host, Pee-Wee Herman!"
| 35 | "The Cousin Who Was Bette Davis" | Paul Miller | Bob Sand, Marc Warren, Dennis Rinsler, Tony Garofalo, Tom Moore, Bob Howard, Greg Fields, Wayland Flowers | November 5, 1982 |
Madame's strange cousin Charley (Charles Pierce) comes for a visit and transforms into Bette Davis every time he hears the word "trash". Pinkerton returns from vacation and falls for Charley in drag. Note: Pierce was an acclaimed female impersonator, and Davis was his signature character.
| 36 | "The Common Fighting Machine" | Paul Miller | Bob Sand, Carter Crocker, Greg Fields, Tom Moore, Marc Warren, Dennis Rinsler, Tony Garofalo, Wayland Flowers | November 8, 1982 |
Madame's drill sergeant nephew (Colby Chester) comes for a visit and puts everyone in the house through training. Meanwhile, a kissing bandit terrorizes the neighborhood, and Frankie Avalon appears on Madame's show.
| 37 | "The Dressman" | Paul Miller | Bob Sand, Carter Crocker, Bob Howard, Tom Moore, Wayland Flowers | November 9, 1982 |
When R. Ray Randall demands that Madame hires a sidekick, she ignores his picks and chooses Lance Lane (Raymond Lynch), a handsome tuxedo model. Note: Lynch previously appeared as Madame's potential suitor, Dr. Carl Treadwell.
| 38 | "No Fun Without Practice" | Paul Miller | Bob Sand, George Atkins, Tony Garofalo, Bob Howard, Wayland Flowers | November 10, 1982 |
Madame invites her ex-husband, Roy Boy McCullough (James Weston) and his new fiancee (Julie Payne) to lunch. Later, she humiliates William Shatner on her show. Dale Gonyea returns to sing "The Ronnie Reagan Rag".
| 39 | "The Man is an Artist" | Paul Miller | Bob Sand, Bob Howard, Tom Moore, George Atkins, Marc Warren, Dennis Rinsler, Wayland Flowers | November 11, 1982 |
Madame hires a pretentious interior decorator (Ken Olfson) who manipulates Bernadette.
| 40 | "Between Delusion and Reality" | Paul Miller | Bob Sand, Frank Mula, Marc Warren, Dennis Rinsler, Bob Howard, Wayland Flowers | November 12, 1982 |
A loony spiritualist (Anita Dangler) is brought in to cleanse the mansion of the ghosts of Groucho Marx (Alan Feiman) and Harpo Marx (Richmond Shepard). George Gobel appears on Madame's show. Note: Because a new storyline was established right before the weekend, this episode ends with a teaser and the next picks up with a recap.
| 41 | "It's the Ghosts!" | Paul Miller | Bob Sand, Frank Mula, Marc Warren, Dennis Rinsler, Greg Fields, George Atkins, Wayland Flowers | November 15, 1982 |
The Marx Brothers continue to play practical jokes. John Schneider appears on Madame's show.
| 42 | "Pinky's Shock" | Paul Miller | Bob Sand, George Atkins, Tony Garofalo, Bob Howard, Tom Moore, Wayland Flowers | November 16, 1982 |
Pinkerton's old girlfriend (Ruta Lee) stops by to inform him that he has a 22-year-old son (Robbie Haymer). Dick Shawn appears on Madame's show. Note: Johnny Haymer's real-life son portrays Walter Pinkerton Jr.
| 43 | "Fans and Fanatics" | Paul Miller | Bob Sand, Marc Warren, Dennis Rinsler, Greg Fields, Frank Mula, Wayland Flowers | November 17, 1982 |
Cindy and Mindy (Lissa Negrin & Hillary Carlip), a pair of obsessed teenage fans, run away from home and break into Madame's mansion. Marty Allen guest stars on Madame's show. Note: Negrin and Carlip were improv comediennes who had a strange act portraying Cindy & Mindy, greeting people at restaurants and airports, posing as their biggest fans.
| 44 | "Comedy, Sex and Pathos" | Paul Miller | Bob Sand, Bob Howard, Tom Moore, George Atkins, Marc Warren, Dennis Rinsler, Tony Garofalo, Wayland Flowers | November 18, 1982 |
Feeling defeated after trying to revive her movie career, Madame decides to quit showbiz. Lance Lane takes over her show and has to contend with drunken chef Julia Chives (Madame's puppeteer, Wayland Flowers, in drag).
| 45 | "Arlene Hoffman Arrives" | Paul Miller | Bob Sand, Tony Garofalo, Greg Fields, Wayland Flowers | November 19, 1982 |
Pinkerton becomes addicted to a soap opera, "The Filthy Itch," that stars Madame's condescending friend Arlene Hoffman (Brooke Bundy). Rip Taylor appears on Madame's show.
| 46 | "Fallow Talents" | Paul Miller | Bob Sand, Carter Crocker, Dennis Rinsler, Marc Warren, Tony Garofalo, Tom Moore, Wayland Flowers | November 22, 1982 |
Sara Joy's ego balloons when she is hypnotized into becoming more assertive. Arsenio Hall makes one of his earliest TV appearances on Madame's show.
| 47 | "Do You Have Problem Areas?" | Paul Miller | Bob Sand, Bob Howard, Tony Garofalo, Tom Moore, George Atkins, Marc Warren, Dennis Rinsler, Wayland Flowers | November 23, 1982 |
Madame hires an expensive makeup consultant (Fern Fitzgerald). Fred Travalena appears on Madame's show.
| 48 | "Bankrupt and Suicidal" | Paul Miller | Bob Sand, Frank Mula, Greg Fields, Wayland Flowers | November 24, 1982 |
Madame learns from the press that her business manager has fled with all her money. Scatman Crothers appears on her show.
| 49 | "Do You Want to Meld With Me?" | Paull Miller | Bob Sand, Marc Warren, Dennis Rinsler, Wayland Flowers | November 25, 1982 |
An alien from outer space (Michael Lee Gogin) pays a visit to the mansion. Comedian Anthony Russell appears on the show. Note: This episode was an attempt to cash in on the recent popularity of E.T. the Extra-Terrestrial.
| 50 | "The Stolen Portrait" | Paul Miller | Bob Sand, Bob Howard, Greg Fields, Wayland Flowers | November 26, 1982 |
When the portrait is stolen from Madame's living room, a bumbling inspector (Vito Scotti) arrives to solve the crime. Julie Budd appears on the show.
| 51 | "Chopper the Shocker" | Paul Miller | Bob Sand, Tom Moore, Frank Mula, Wayland Flowers | November 29, 1982 |
While Pinkerton is away on vacation, his biker brother shows up. Jerry Reed appears on Madame's show.
| 52 | "A Poor Old Lady" | Paul Miller | Bob Sand, Marc Warren, Dennis Rinsler, Wayland Flowers | November 30, 1982 |
Madame's IRS audit is sabotaged by Mister Honest.
| 53 | "The Nice Bernadette" | Paul Miller | Bob Sand, Carter Crocker, Frank Mula, Tom Moore, Tony Garofalo, Greg Fields, Wayland Flowers | December 1, 1982 |
Mister Honest learns that Bernadette is his secret admirer. Also, Alice Ghostley spars with Madame when she appears on the show.
| 54 | "His Biggest Dream" | Paul Miller | Bob Sand, George Atkins, Marc Warren, Dennis Rinsler, Frank Mula, Greg Fields, Wayland Flowers | December 2, 1982 |
Pinkerton trains a female prizefighter (Donna Ponterotto).
| 55 | "What Bliss, a Nun" | Paul Miller | Unknown | December 5, 1982 |
When nuns move into the neighborhood, one becomes determined to sing on Madame's show.
| 56 | "The Diet Guru is Coming" | Paul Miller | Unknown | December 6, 1982 |
Madame hires a dietician to curb the junk-food habit in the mansion.
| 57 | "Candidates for Hollywood" | Paul Miller | Unknown | December 7, 1982 |
Madame runs for city council. Donna Mills appears on the show.
| 58 | "War of the Star Employees" | Paul Miller | Unknown | December 8, 1982 |
Madame and her staff compete on the game show "Celebrity Staff Battle". Note: The show went into reruns until February after this episode. Confusingly, the hour-long recap version continued to air.
| 59 | "Between Two Lovers" | Paul Miller | Unknown | February 4, 1983 |
When Sara Joy is forced to choose between two men, she instead picks Pinkerton.
| 60 | "Son of the Great Magician" | Paul Miller | Unknown | February 7, 1983 |
Madame gives a young magician a break. However, Bernadette sabotages his act, blaming the young man's father for her beloved husband's death.
| 61 | "The Old Liar" | Paul Miller | Unknown | February 8, 1983 |
Mister Honest is kidnapped.
| 62 | "From the Fast Squad" | Paul Miller | Unknown | February 9, 1983 |
Larry Lunch decides to quit showbiz after he is hit with divorce papers, so Pinkerton is forced to take over as Madame's agent.
| 63 | "No Place in Heaven" | Paul Miller | Unknown | February 10, 1983 |
Madame's musical conductor, Ronald Espiranza, is visited by the ghost of his dead wife, who materializes in front of a freaked-out Madame.
| 64 | "Bitten by the Vampire" | Paul Miller | Bob Sand, Marc Warren, Dennis Rinsler, Wayland Flowers | February 11, 1983 |
Madame is transformed into a vampire by her new neighbor, Baron Von Leer (Bill Kirchenbauer).
| 65 | "Kiki, the Competition" | Paul Miller | Unknown | February 14, 1983 |
Madame learns that she has an impersonator (Louise Williams). Also, Chad Everett appears on the show.
| 66 | "The Insect Affair" | Paul Miller | Unknown | February 15, 1983 |
Madame schemes to get Larry Lunch booked onto a rival's TV show.
| 67 | "A Royal Visit" | Paul Miller | Unknown | February 16, 1983 |
Madame is visited by Queen Dorianna.
| 68 | "Surfboard of the Gods" | Paul Miller | Unknown | February 17, 1983 |
The city wants to tear down Madame's mansion to make room for a new highway. Steve Allen appears on Madame's show.
| 69 | "We Need the Antidote" | Paul Miller | Unknown | February 18, 1983 |
Madame's houseguest is transformed into a houseplant.
| 70 | "The Exterminator is Coming" | Paul Miller | Unknown | February 21, 1983 |
Lonesome Pinkerton decides to live the life of a swinging single, which results in disaster.
| 71 | "Call Me Foxy" | Paul Miller | Unknown | February 22, 1983 |
Sara Joy is offered the opportunity to become a nude centerfold. Note: Judy Landers (Sara Joy) and her sister, Audrey Landers, graced the January 1983 cover of Playboy, appearing partially nude for the photo shoot.
| 72 | "On a Hot Mission" | Paul Miller | Unknown | February 23, 1983 |
The CIA recruits Madame to acquire a secret chemical from a Russian diplomat.
| 73 | "Piggy on Duty" | Paul Miller | Unknown | February 24, 1983 |
Sara Joy gets fed up with Hollywood and joins the army.
| 74 | "Worse Than Jail" | Paul Miller | Unknown | February 25, 1983 |
Sara Joy's new army sergeant (Sarina C. Grant) mistakes Madame for an AWOL recruit and forces her to enlist.

=== Weekend version ===
Paramount created hour-long edits to give the show wider exposure, but it backfired, with more stations opting to run the weekend edition than the standard weekday episodes. It was reported that these edits combined two episodes "with extra material," but TV listings sometimes indicated storylines from only one to up to four shows. This version aired straight through Christmas, so several episodes debuted in this format before the stand-alone weekday versions were broadcast in February. None are available on YouTube, they were last broadcast in the United States in 1983, and specifics are scarce.

| No. | Title | Directed by | Written by | Original release date |
|---|---|---|---|---|
| 1 | TBA | Paul Miller | Unknown | September 25, 1982 |
"The Successful Comeback" and "A Bath for Eddie".
| 2 | TBA | Paul Miller | Unknown | October 2, 1982 |
"Movie Stars and Producers," the other half is unknown.
| 3 | TBA | Paul Miller | Unknown | October 9, 1982 |
"Buzzy's Puberty;" the other half is unknown.
| 4 | TBA | Paul Miller | Unknown | October 16, 1982 |
"I Am What I Am;" the other half is unknown.
| 5 | TBA | Paul Miller | Unknown | October 23, 1982 |
"The Golden Mousetrap", "Barbra Streisand's Nose", "Hypnosis is Fun", and "Other People's Garbage".
| 6 | TBA | Don Barnhart | Unknown | October 30, 1982 |
"Inga's Spicy Meatballs" and "Naked Lou From Malibu
| 7 | TBA | Paul Miller | Unknown | November 6, 1982 |
"Everyone Has a Dream Role" and "Striptease Sensational".
| 8 | TBA | Paul Miller | Unknown | November 13, 1982 |
"The Common Fighting Machine" and "No Fun Without Practice".
| 9 | TBA | Paul Miller | Unknown | November 20, 1982 |
"Between Delusion and Reality" and "It's the Ghosts".
| 10 | TBA | Paul Miller | Unknown | November 27, 1982 |
"Fallow Talents" and "Do You Want to Meld with Me?"
| 11 | TBA | Paul Miller | Unknown | December 4, 1982 |
"The Stolen Portrait" and "His Biggest Dream".
| 12 | TBA | Paul Miller | Unknown | December 11, 1982 |
"Candidates for Hollywood" and "War of the Star Employees".
| 13 | TBA | Paul Miller | Unknown | December 18, 1982 |
"From the Fast Squad" and "Bitten By the Vampire".
| 14 | TBA | Paul Miller | Unknown | December 25, 1982 |
"Kiki, the Competition" and "Surfboard of the Gods".
| 15 | TBA | Paul Miller | Unknown | January 1, 1983 |
"Piggy on Duty" and "Worse Than Jail".
