= Adobe Character Animator =

Motion-capture animation software

- Adobe Character Animator running on OS X
- Developer: Adobe Inc.
- Release: June 15, 2015; 11 years ago
- Stable release: 26.0 / January 2026
- Written in: C++, Lua, JavaScript
- Operating system: Windows 10 (64-bit) v20H2 or later; macOS 13.0 or later
- Type: Computer animation
- License: Freemium for Starter mode, trialware/software as a service for Pro mode
- Website: adobe.com/products/character-animator.html

Adobe Character Animator is a desktop application software product that combines real-time live motion-capture with a multi-track recording system to control layered 2D puppets based on an illustration drawn in Photoshop or Illustrator. It is automatically installed with Adobe After Effects CC 2015 to 2017 and is also available as a standalone application which one can download separately as part of a Creative Cloud all-apps subscription. It is used to generate real-time 2D animations to produce both live and non-live animation.

== Description ==
Character Animator imports layered Adobe Photoshop and Adobe Illustrator documents into puppets which have behaviors applied to them. The puppets are then placed into a scene, which can be viewed in the Scene panel and Timeline panel. Rigging is set up in the Puppet panel, though basic rigging is fully automatic based on specific layer names like Right Eyebrow and Smile. Properties of selected elements can be examined and changed in the Properties panel, including behavior parameters. Live inputs include a webcam (for face-tracking), microphone (for live lip sync), keyboard (for triggering layers to hide/show), and mouse (for warping specific handles).

Final output of a scene can be exported to a sequence of PNG files and a WAV file, or any video format supported by Adobe Media Encoder. Live output can be sent to other applications running on the same machine via the Syphon protocol (Mac only) or Adobe Mercury Transmit on both Mac and Windows. Scenes can also be dropped directly into After Effects and Premiere Pro, using Dynamic Link to avoid rendering.

== History ==
Character Animator was originally code-named "Animal".

The following is the list of versions of Character Animator.

Ship Date	Version	Shipped with	Major features added
June 15, 2015	Preview 1	After Effects CC 2015.0 (13.5)	markerless face tracking; layered PSD & AI import; WAV & AIFF import; PNG sequence export; WAV export
July 27, 2015	Preview 2		more accurate face tracking and lip sync; track reordering and snapping in the timeline; transparency grid; improved performance; bug fixes
November 30, 2015	Preview 3	After Effects CC 2015.1 (13.6)	“sticks” to control rigidity of the puppet mesh, multi-touch gestures to control character limbs, the ability to share rigged puppets, increased recording flexibility, performance improvements
June 21, 2016 (announced April 12, 2016)	Preview 4	After Effects CC 2015.3 (13.8)	visual layer tagging, improved lip sync, export via Adobe Media Encoder, Syphon support, Motion Trigger, Auto Blink
November 2, 2016	Beta 5	After Effects CC 2017 (14.0)	dynamic link to After Effects and Premiere Pro, shareable puppet files, Cycle Pause tag, MP3 import, PNG sequence import, speed improvements
April 19, 2017	Beta 6	After Effects CC 2017 (14.2)	automatic walk cycles, viseme editor, cross-platform live streaming output via Mercury Transmit, layer blending modes, workspace modes, additional languages (Simplified Chinese, Portuguese, Italian, Spanish, Russian, and Korean)
October 18, 2017 (announced September 14, 2017)	1.1	part of Creative Cloud All Apps	Controls & Triggers panels, MIDI support, pose-to-pose Face & Eye Gaze animation, audio waveform in the timeline, copy and paste of visemes into After Effects, auto-attach, clipping masks, Layer Picker, Fader, Collide & Dynamic tags, improved lip sync
December 11, 2017	1.1.1	part of Creative Cloud All Apps	minor UI changes and bug fixes
April 3, 2018	1.5	part of Creative Cloud All Apps	particle physics, scene snapshots, improved triggers UI, copy and paste takes and triggers, countdown before recording, custom Controls panel button art
October 15, 2018 (announced September 9, 2018)	2.0	part of Creative Cloud All Apps	Characterizer, replays, magnets, squashiness, shoulder and hip tags, history bookmarks
April 3, 2019	2.1	part of Creative Cloud All Apps	Character Trigger extension for Twitch, jaw movement based on visemes, search filtering for behaviors, UI polish
June 17, 2019	2.1.1	part of Creative Cloud All Apps	bug fixes
November 4, 2019	3.0	part of Creative Cloud All Apps	keyframes, scene cameras, triggerable audio, motion lines, rigging issues pane, search filtering for tags and triggers
December 9, 2019	3.1	part of Creative Cloud All Apps	trigger labels, search filters for project items
February 19, 2020	3.2	part of Creative Cloud All Apps	keyframe time stretching, replays-related improvements, new keyboard shortcuts, automatic addition of corresponding behavior for Pin, Dragger, and Dangle tools
May 18, 2020	3.3	part of Creative Cloud All Apps	feedback button, markers over dynamic link, timeline search filter, audio track volume control
June 15, 2020	3.3.1	part of Creative Cloud All Apps	bug fixes, new icon
October 20, 2020	3.4	part of Creative Cloud All Apps	speech-aware animation, improved lip sync, limb IK, merge takes
February, 2021	3.5	part of Creative Cloud All Apps	timeline snapping options
March 10, 2021	4.0	part of Creative Cloud All Apps	new file format (faster, more compact, and resilient to corruption)
May 10, 2021	4.2	part of Creative Cloud All Apps	automatic damaged project recovery
July 19, 2021	4.4	part of Creative Cloud All Apps	native Apple silicon support, faster speech-aware animation
26 October 2021	22.0	part of Creative Cloud All Apps	body tracker, smart replays, head & body turner, updated examples
13 December 2021	22.1.1	part of Creative Cloud All Apps	puppet maker, transcript-based lip sync
8 February 2022	22.2	part of Creative Cloud All Apps	bug fixes
11 April 2022	22.3	part of Creative Cloud All Apps	bug fixes
9 May 2022	22.4	part of Creative Cloud All Apps	bug fixes
21 June 2022	22.5	part of Creative Cloud All Apps	Starter mode, Quick Export, Auto-swap, and Leader/Follower behavior
17 October 2022	23.0	part of Creative Cloud All Apps	Motion Library
6 December 2022	23.1	part of Creative Cloud All Apps	Motion Library Strength parameter and Modernized GPU support
11 August 2023	23.6	part of Creative Cloud All Apps	Custom Background in Starter mode, Editable Replays and Select Takes Within or Overlapping Work Area
17 October 2023	24.0	part of Creative Cloud All Apps	stability improvements and bug fixes
7 February 2024	24.2	part of Creative Cloud All Apps	improvements and stability updates
21 August 2024	24.6	part of Creative Cloud All Apps	improvements and stability updates
14 October 2024	25.0	part of Creative Cloud All Apps	improvements and stability updates with no new features
13 November 2025	25.6	part of Creative Cloud All Apps	improvements and stability updates with no new features
21 January 2026	26.0	part of Creative Cloud All Apps	improvements and stability updates with no new features

== See also ==
- Aniforms
- Adobe After Effects
- Adobe Animate (formerly Macromedia Flash)
