= Wayland Flowers =

American actor, comedian and puppeteer (1939–88)

- Wayland Flowers and Madame from Madame in Manhattan
- Born: Wayland Parrott Flowers Jr. November 26, 1939; Dawson, Georgia, U.S.
- Died: October 11, 1988 (aged 48); Los Angeles, California, U.S.
- Resting place: Cedar Hill Cemetery
- Occupations: Actor; comedian; puppeteer
- Years active: 1964–1988

Wayland Parrott Flowers Jr. (November 26, 1939 – October 11, 1988) was an American actor, comedian and puppeteer. Flowers was best known for the comedy act he created with his puppet Madame. His performances as "Wayland Flowers and Madame" were a major national success on stage and on screen in the 1970s and 1980s.

Flowers is frequently cited as a ventriloquist even though he made no effort to conceal that he was voicing his characters. He instead preferred to be called an "illusionist," because onlookers tended to focus their attention on his animated puppets, who seemed to do all the talking.

== Early life ==
Wayland Parrott Flowers Jr. was born November 26, 1939, in Dawson, Georgia, the second of three children. Wayland's father, in the Army, was soon deployed in World War II and was killed in action, leaving Flowers to be raised in a devoutly religious all-female household, save for his younger brother. There was a neighborhood girl with whom he liked to play with dolls; however, this was socially unacceptable for a boy in 1940s Georgia, so he would wrap up the dolls in paper bags, bring them to her house, and they would play with them in her garage.

As he reached adulthood, his mother encouraged him to go to college, so he spent a year-and-a-half at Young Harris College, transferred to Rollins College, and then dropped out and enlisted in the Coast Guard. While stationed in Connecticut, he traveled to New York City, saw the Broadway productions of Gypsy and West Side Story, and fell in love with the city. He briefly returned to Atlanta, decided he was unhappy there, hitchhiked to New York City with $5 in his pocket, and began living the life of a struggling artist.

== Career ==
=== Origins of Madame ===
In a 1982 interview with Armistead Maupin, Flowers remarked that he had never worked with puppets until he landed a job as a puppeteer for Bil Baird's Marionettes show at the 1964 New York World's Fair. In a program created for a memorial at the Center for Puppetry Arts, it was claimed that he had a long history of working with puppets, dating back to his early childhood. Regardless, World's Fair coworker Bob Payne noticed Flowers' affection for the toys and gave him a puppet that had been created as The Wicked Witch of the West for a production of The Wizard of Oz. He hung her in the closet and found her soulful eyes staring back at him each time he opened the door.

One day, he was sitting in a bar when a doddering little old lady walked in with a small dog on a leash. As a joke, the bartender picked up the woman by her crotch and hoisted her in the air, upon which she screamed, "Put me down, ya cocksucker!" Flowers was taken aback hearing such language from an old woman, so he struck up a conversation with her and discovered she had been a Ziegfeld girl. He suddenly got the idea to transform the witch into a character loosely patterned after this woman, although he also cited his mother and aunt for inspiring Madame's attitude. Years after his death, restaurant manager and longtime friend of Washington D.C.'s gay community, Margo MacGregor, claimed that she was the character's inspiration.) Bedecked in fabulous evening wear and "summer diamonds" ("Some are diamonds; some are not"), Madame's look was patterned after movie stars such as Gloria Swanson and Tallulah Bankhead.

When he was between jobs, Flowers began performing street theater for tips, and that's where Madame began her career. If he wanted a drink, he'd go into a bar, prop up the puppet and say, "Buy me a fucking drink." Someone would always oblige, and Madame would lipsync to records as Wayland drank. A Greenwich Village bar owner was amused by their antics and offered the duo $20 to sit at her piano and perform, so Wayland quickly concocted an act. He developed double entendres, witty comebacks, and recycled old vaudevillian jokes, which became Madame's schtick. He garnered success in the gay clubs of New York, and eventually debuted Madame Off-Broadway at the Village Gate in 1971's Kumquats, billed as "the world's first erotic puppet show," which also included the "notorious ejaculating Punchinello." The show played 53 performances between November 1971 and January 1972.

His success in New York led him to get booked into The Pilgrim House in Provincetown, Massachusetts, in 1972, where he continued to perform nearly every season until his death. He was initially booked as a 15-minute opening lounge act, but within a week, he had attracted massive crowds. Madame had been primarily playing to gays, but Wayland found a more diverse audience in Provincetown, where they were treated like major celebrities. "This was an underground act that took root and shot up out of nowhere," Flowers remarked.

Several of Madame's character traits were also found in another popular puppet character of the time, The Muppets' Miss Piggy. Flowers felt that Jim Henson and his team had lifted material that he had created for Madame. When asked about the similarities, Flowers as Madame, responded; "Well. (Makes a face.) I think that every pig must have her own day. She's certainly had hers. Took all my ideas and just went to market with 'em, while this little piggy stayed home."

Flowers created an elaborate backstory for Madame, which he committed to the page with Gary Simmons in the 1983 book Madame: My Misbegotten Memoirs. In addition to Madame, Flowers featured other puppets in his act that included Crazy Mary (an escapee from Bellevue mental hospital), Jiffy (a Harlem harlot with a heart of brass), Mr. Macklehoney (a crotchety, retired vaudeville comedian), and Michael Honey (a horny old gay man).

=== Television ===
Soon after The World's Fair ended, Flowers began dabbling in puppetry on New York television, creating and performing characters on the Aniforms segment of the 1965 series The Surprise Show and Captain Kangaroo.

Paul Lynde caught one of his performances in Provincetown and invited Flowers to come to Hollywood, where his career exploded. His first major national TV gig was designing and puppeteering the Baby Smedley puppets (voiced by Mel Brooks and Marlo Thomas) for the all-star 1974 TV special Free to Be... You and Me, a tie-in with the successful children's album of the same name. According to various sources, he earned a special Emmy Award for his puppets. That same year, Madame appeared in her first TV special for WNEW, Old is Somebody Else: Aging, Everybody is Doing It, which garnered Wayland a New York Emmy Award for "Special Use of an Unusual Craft."

In 1975, he and Madame appeared in the sketch comedy show Keep on Truckin'. Debuting as a summer series was enough to prove that the network had little faith in it, but the show was dealt a crippling blow when host Rod Serling died two weeks before the premiere. Serling's segments were removed, and the show lasted a scant four weeks on the air.

The duo soon rebounded as regulars on the 1976 series Andy, a syndicated revival of The Andy Williams Show. This cemented their success, leading to talk show appearances, a small role in the Redd Foxx movie Norman... Is That You?, a long run on the game show Hollywood Squares (replacing Paul Lynde in The Center Square), a featured role on the 1977 revival of Laugh-In, a recurring comedy skit on Solid Gold, TV guest spots, and even regional commercials.

Feeling he could take his act further, he began developing the TV sitcom Madame's Place, which debuted in 1982 and costarred Susan Tolsky, Johnny Haymer, Judy Landers, Corey Feldman and Ty Henderson. The show was serialized, following the day-to-day goings-on of Madame and those closest to her, and featuring celebrities, comedians, and musical acts in a show within a show that she hosted nightly from her mansion. Outside of a shot in the opening credits, Flowers only appeared on-screen once; in "Comedy, Sex, and Pathos," he popped up in drag as inebriated cooking show host Julia Chives.

Production began in August 1982, with the cast and crew working at a breakneck pace to churn out 75 half-hour shows in 26 weeks. In addition to shooting the shows on weekdays, Madame also had a regular gig on Solid Gold, which they'd shoot on Friday nights. It's been alleged that Flowers developed a heavy cocaine habit during the production in an effort to keep up the pace, and that he was often so blitzed that he had to be carried on and off the set of Solid Gold. During an interview on the set of Madame's Place, Armistead Maupin remarked that he'd lost a significant amount of weight. Despite its wide exposure, Madame's Place was initially considered unsuccessful and canceled after one season. However, the show went on to have a long life in daytime reruns on the USA Network.

After the failure of Madame's Place, Flowers kept his Solid Gold gig temporarily, then stepped away from the Hollywood spotlight, focusing more on live venues—but Madame did eventually briefly return to Solid Gold and a revival of The Hollywood Squares.

== Personal life ==
Flowers was shy and lived through Madame, who became his constant companion everywhere he went.

Although he has been posthumously cited as one of the first mainstream entertainers who was openly gay, this is untrue. He was well-known for performing on the gay circuit, but feared that publicly saying the words "I am gay" would "cost him a million dollars a year." When the Bay Area Reporter's Steve Warren asked about his sexuality in a 1982 interview, Flowers lashed out, asking, "What's the point anyway? Why does everyone have to have a label? I don't know what I am. I've tried everything, although I have my preferences."

In the years since his death, there have been claims of promiscuity, temperamental behavior, and a snowballing drug habit that led him to alienate friends and associates, but he lived his life outside of the spotlight, which was generally shining on his alter ego.

== Death ==
In September 1987, Flowers was diagnosed with HIV, but he did not publicly announce his diagnosis and continued to perform. He eventually developed Kaposi's sarcoma, an AIDS-related cancer. On September 2, 1988, he collapsed onstage while performing at Harrah's in Lake Tahoe. After a brief hospitalization, he returned to his hometown of Dawson, Georgia, where he visited family. Upon returning to Los Angeles, he moved into the Hughes House hospice for palliative care. On October 11, 1988, Flowers died at Hughes House of complications from AIDS-related Kaposi's sarcoma at the age of 48. His remains were cremated at Grand View Memorial Park & Crematory in Glendale, California, and shipped back to his hometown of Dawson, Georgia, where they are interred at Cedar Hills Cemetery. He went on to be memorialized on The AIDS Quilt, although his name was misspelled as Waylon Flowers.

Following Flowers' death, the Star tabloid reported that Madame was buried with him, a falsehood that has frequently been repeated. Flowers bequeathed the puppets and his estate to his friend, manager, and ultimately, his caregiver, Marlena Shell.

== Madame's revivals ==
Actress Debbie Reynolds, a friend of Flowers' who did an impersonation of Madame in her nightclub act, urged Marlena Shell (Wayland Flowers' last manager and the administrator of his estate) to let another puppeteer take over soon after Flowers' death, but Shell was too devastated to consider it. Over a decade later, Shell caught wind of impersonators and initially tried to stop them, but ultimately decided to combat them by bringing Madame out of retirement. "I think I waited too long," she remarked, "[but] if I didn't bring [Madame] back, eventually no one would know who she is." Shell had been so close to Wayland that she became overprotective of the character and blew through a succession of performers, claiming that they were each trying "to morph Madame into what was comfortable for them," rather than staying true to Flowers' vision.

First was Thom Fountain, the puppeteer for Salem the Cat on Sabrina the Teenage Witch, who appeared with Madame on a 2003 revival of The Hollywood Squares, and at the 25th anniversary of the Center for Puppetry Arts (where one of the Madame puppets has been permanently on display). Then she hired Jerry Halliday, who featured Madame in his show Famous Women, which made Shell unhappy because she perceived Madame as a solo headliner.

Next, she hired Joe Kovacs, who spent a year practicing with the puppet and even went to a vocal coach in an attempt to sound more like Flowers before concluding that years of drinking and drugging had lowered Madame's voice. Kovacs debuted the show "It's Madame with an E!" at The Empire Plush Room, a defunct cabaret in San Francisco's York Hotel, in November 2006. The next year, Kovacs appeared with Madame on VH1's I Love the '70s: Volume 2 and the live show "A Comeback from Abroad," which played in San Francisco and New York before he had a falling out with Shell, who hired entertainer Rick Skye to take over. At the same time, Shell sent a cease-and-desist letter to Mark Paquette, a performer who alleged that he was the boyfriend of Flowers and was given the rights to the character. Paquette countered with a $10 million trademark infringement suit against Shell that was later thrown out.

After appearances on several television shows, Skye's performances of "It's Madame with an E!" began November 15, 2008, at Resorts Atlantic City, and later toured the US in 2010. In 2013, Madame found herself on the arm of Gary Holland for a "White Carpet Commentary" in Palm Springs, and the live show "Madame's Back."

Shell made two attempts at crowdfunding, both of which were dismally unsuccessful. In 2012, she proposed the semimonthly "Madame Show" (AKA "Madame for President"), a YouTube series that was to have featured Madame on the streets of New York, in a studio and on tour. The Kickstarter campaign had a $56K goal but only attained a paltry $345 in pledges. The following year, an IndieGoGo campaign was set up to fund a national tour of "Madame's Back," which fared slightly better but still fell very short, with a $50K goal and $4,855 in pledges.

Several years later, Shell suffered a debilitating stroke and sold Madame's rights to Ken Horgan and his husband, Scott Bente, owners of The Pilgrim House in Provincetown, where Wayland and Madame found their first major taste of success. Shell also provided them boxes of Flowers' belongings that had been packed away for decades, which included lost performances on videotape, scripts, notes, puppets, and much more.

In 2021, Madame made her triumphant return to Provincetown on the arm of Matt W. Cody in Madame: ALIVE! Audience members complained that they preferred Kovacs' interpretation of the character. The following year, Horgan pleaded with Kovacs to team up with Madame again, so Kovacs, his life partner, and their cat moved to Provincetown. A new performance of Madame: ALIVE! was staged in July 2022, followed by Madame's Face-for-Radio Holiday Hootenanny in December.

== Legacy ==
Flowers spent the end of his life in L.A.'s first AIDS hospice, Hughes House, and left money in his will for another to be opened, called the Wayland Flowers House. The funds went directly to Hughes House, which was renamed and closed a few months later because its county contract was not renewed, although it was briefly reopened in the early '90s.

Wayland carried numerous Madame puppets on tour with him in case there was a problem or so he could do a quick costume change. In 2015, a puppet that had been in the care of Flowers' former stage manager sold at Julien's Auctions for $12,500. An earlier puppet, which didn't have arms, was featured on a 2022 episode of Antiques Roadshow, and estimated to be valued at $15-$20,000.

A third puppet was auctioned off in 1990 by Butterfield's in San Francisco, and sold to an anonymous buyer for $11,000. In 1991, this same puppet went on permanent display at The Museum of Modern Art in a piece by artist Nayland Blake titled "Magic," which featured Madame in an open steamer trunk surrounded by dead flowers.

Flowers inspired the first name of Waylon Smithers, a fictional character on the animated TV series The Simpsons, who later came out as gay.

American drag queen Raja Gemini performed as Madame on the seventh season of RuPaul's Drag Race, on the show's Snatch Game, a segment inspired by the television game show Match Game.

In 2022, Julian Hooper's original screenplay Madame—based on the life of Wayland Flowers—was named a Finalist in the Nicholl Fellowship, the annual screenwriting competition of the Academy of Motion Picture Arts and Sciences. Selected from 5,526 scripts submitted across 85 countries, Madame advanced through multiple rounds of judging by industry professionals and Academy members before being named a finalist by the Academy Nicholl Fellowships Committee.

== Filmography ==
Year	Title	Role	Notes
1965	Aniforms		
1974	Free to Be... You and Me	Baby Smedleys	TV Special
1974	Lampoon	Madame	TV Special
1974	Old Is Somebody Else: Aging, Everybody Is Doing It	Madame	TV Special
1975	Keep On Truckin'	Madame / Jiffy	4 episodes
1976–1977	Andy	Madame / Mr. Mackelhoney / Jiffy	26 episodes
1976	Norman... Is That You?	Larry Davenport / Madame	Feature Film
1976–1981	The Hollywood Squares	Madame	
1977	The Dean Martin Celebrity Roast	Madame	Episode: Peter Marshall
1977	Disco Fever: 'Saturday Night Fever' Premiere Party	Madame	TV Special
1977	The Great American Laugh Off	Madame	TV Special
1977	Laugh In	Madame / Jiffy / Crazy Mary	6 Episodes
1979	All-Star Secrets	Madame	5 episodes
1979	The First Annual Zany Awards	Madame	TV Special
1979	Playboy's Roller Disco & Pajama Party	Madame / Jiffy	TV Special
1980	The Beatrice Arthur Special	Madame	TV Special
1980	All Kindsa Stuff	Madame	TV Special
1980	Don Rickles and His Wise Guys	Madame	TV Special
1980	Men Who Rate a 10	Madame	TV Special
1981	Madame in Manhattan	Madame / Jiffy / Crazy Mary	TV Special
1981–1984, 1987	Solid Gold	Madame	
1982	Madame's Place	Madame / Jiffy / Crazy Mary / Mr. Mackelhoney	Unaired Pilot
1982	Madame's Place	Madame / Julia Chives	75 episodes
1982	Macy's Thanksgiving Day Parade	Madame	TV Special
1986–1987	The New Hollywood Squares	Madame	
2008	An Evening at the Backlot with Wayland and Madame: The Lost Video	Madame / Jiffy / Crazy Mary / Mr. Mackelhoney	Recorded in 1977
