= Crunchyroll Expo =

Anime convention in San Jose, California

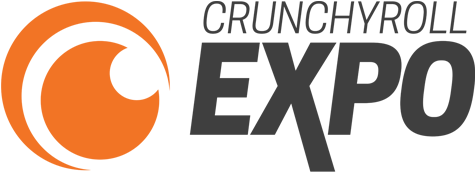

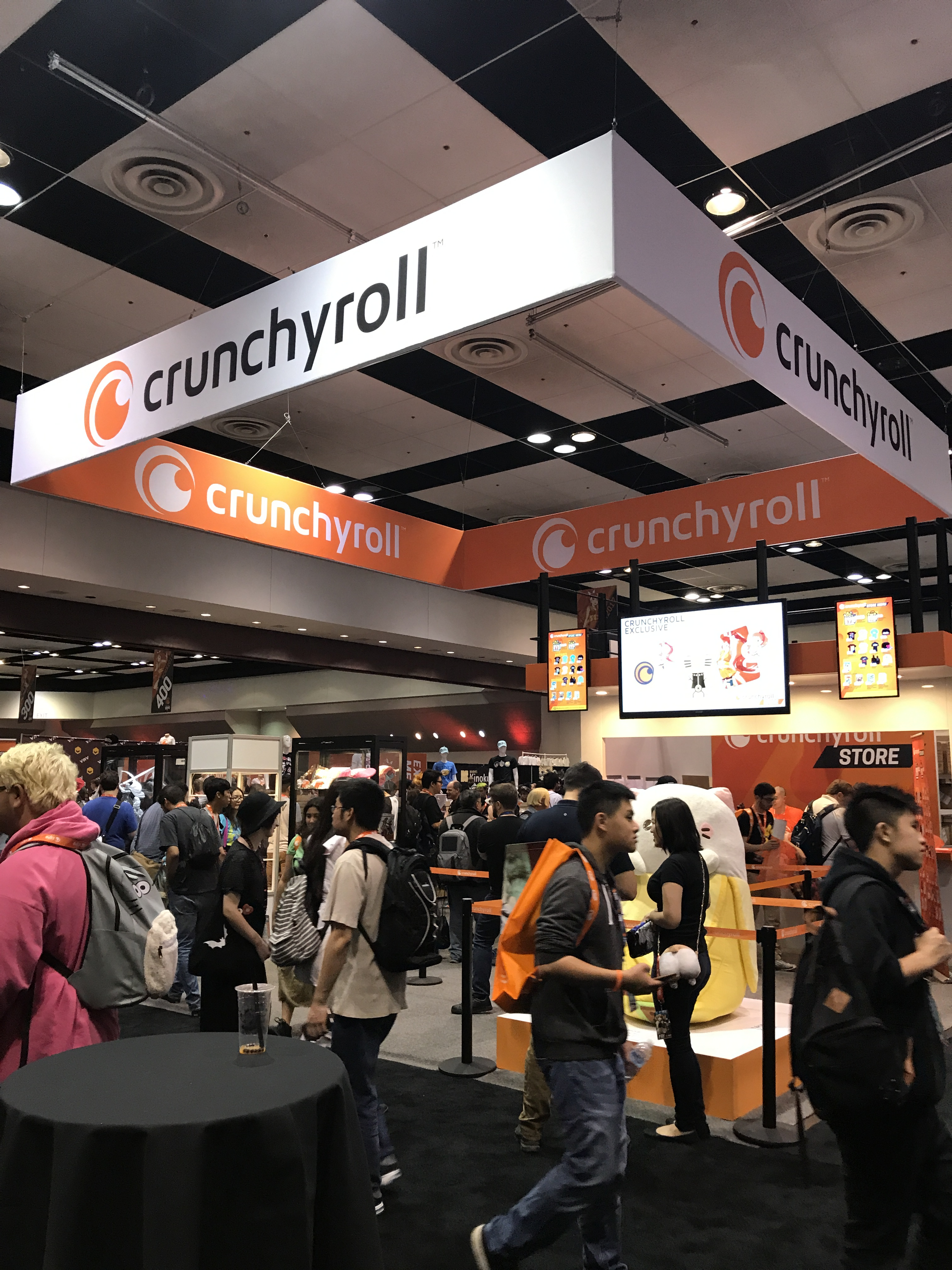
- The Crunchyroll Store at Crunchyroll Expo 2017
- Status: On Hiatus
- Genre: Anime
- Venue: San Jose McEnery Convention Center
- Location: San Jose, California
- Coordinates: 37°19′43″N 121°53′20″W
- Country: United States
- Inaugurated: August 25, 2017; 9 years ago
- Attendance: 16,000 (est.) total in 2017
- Organizer: Crunchyroll; LeftField Media
- Website: crunchyrollexpo.com

Crunchyroll Expo (CRX) was an annual three-day anime convention held during August/September at the San Jose McEnery Convention Center in San Jose, California over Labor Day weekend. The convention was organized by anime licensor Crunchyroll and LeftField Media.

== Programming ==
The convention typically offered an Artists Alley, Dealers Room, a Masquerade, panels, and video games.

== History ==
Crunchyroll Expo was first held in 2017 at the Santa Clara Convention Center in Santa Clara, California. LeftField Media was brought in to help run the convention. Crunchyroll Expo received most of its ticket sales in the days before the event. MAGWest was held the same weekend, and the conventions partnered to allow attendees to participate in limited events at the other. The convention had staffing and badge check issues, along with autograph ticket confusion. They also had no video rooms.

Crunchyroll Expo for 2018 moved to the San Jose McEnery Convention Center in San Jose, California. They were the same weekend as SacAnime. Crunchyroll partnered with ReedPop to organize Crunchyroll Expo starting in 2020. Crunchyroll Expo 2020 was canceled due to the COVID-19 pandemic. An online event named Virtual Crunchyroll Expo was instead held from September 4–6, 2020. The pandemic also resulted in the 2021 convention's cancellation, and it was again replaced with an online event.

Crunchyroll Expo 2022 was a hybrid convention, with both physical and online events. The convention featured a new music festival, the Crunchy City Music Fest. Crunchyroll Expo had an attendance cap, and admission was sold out. The convention also had mask and vaccination requirements due to the COVID-19 pandemic, along with increased security. LeftField Media also returned to run the convention. Crunchyroll Expo did not occur in 2023, in order for Crunchyroll to prioritize other events worldwide.

=== Event history ===
Dates	Location	Atten.	Guests
August 25–27, 2017	Santa Clara Convention Center; Santa Clara, California	16,000 (est.) total 35,000 turnstile	Yoshitaka Amano, Ray Chase, SungWon Cho, Caitlin Glass, Roland Kelts, Mega64, Max Mittelman, Octopimp, Chris Parson, Monica Rial, Adam Savage, Hiroshi Shimizu, The Fairly OddParents creator Butch Hartman, voice actors Shun Horie and Hiromi Igarashi, figure skater Johnny Weir, manga artist Kore Yamazaki, and author Keiichi Sigsawa.
September 1–3, 2018	San Jose McEnery Convention Center; San Jose, California	45,000 turnstile (est.)	Yoshitoshi ABe, Justin Briner, Mica Burton, Clifford Chapin, Luci Christian, Colleen Clinkenbeard, Yuichi Fukushima, Kun Gao, Ryo Horikawa, Atsuko Ishizuka, MeltingMirror, Atsushi Nishigori, Sean Schemmel, Stephanie Sheh, Michael Sinterniklaas, Masayoshi Tanaka, TeddyLoid, Mike Toole, and Andrew Upton.
August 30 – September 1, 2019	San Jose McEnery Convention Center; San Jose, California		Yuu Asakawa, Kira Buckland, Flow, DJ HeavyGrinder, Ryo Horikawa, Xanthe Huynh, Junji Ito, Sunao Katabuchi, Mike McFarland, Toshio Nakatani, None Like Joshua, Brina Palencia, Tara Sands, Eric Stuart, Yuzuru Tachikawa, TeddyLoid, Kimura U, 22/7 voice actors Sally Amaki, Kanae Shirosawa, and Ruri Umino; Food Wars!: Shokugeki no Soma writer Yūto Tsukuda and artist Shun Saeki; and staff members of Zombie Land Saga, including voice actors Kaede Hondo and Asami Tano, composer Yasuharu Takanashi, and MAPPA CEO Manabu Ohtsuka. Rock band Flow, whose songs have been featured in various anime as opening themes, held a concert on August 30.
September 4–6, 2020	Online convention		Shusuke Katagiri, Myth & Roid, Rian Tachibana, and Matt Schley.
August 5–7, 2021	Online convention		
August 5–7, 2022	San Jose McEnery Convention Center; San Jose, California		Chinatsu Akasaki, Watson Amelia, Kosuke Arai, Aru.rinh, Atarashii Gakko!, Hakos Baelz, Dominique "King Vader" Barrett, Mario Bueno, Burnout Syndromes, Rosalie Chiang, Shoya Chiba, Jade Dennis, Chris "Papa Bear" English, Cheyenne Ewulu, Ricco Fajardo, Shawn Gann, Cris George, Gawr Gura, Kwok-Wai Hanson, Hiromitsu Iijima, Ninomae Ina'nis, Jacki Jing, Okitsugu Kado, Tasuku Kaito, Reagan Kathryn, Takanashi Kiara, Makoto Kimura, Baku Kinoshita, Akari Kito, Chiaki Kobayashi, Yurika Kubo, Chris Lam, James Landino, Lex Lang, Linda Le, Tim Lyu, Madkid, Maridah, Eric Maruscak, Adam McArthur, Masahiko Minami, Rei Miyasaka, Amador Molina, Lauren Moore, Shihori Nakane, Nerds Know, Kureiji Ollie, Yuki Ono, OTAKUpassport, Manabu Otsuka, Kevin Penkin, Zeno Robinson, Kate Sánchez, Brandon C. Schindewolf, Sevenn, Megan Shipman, SiM, Suncake, Risa Taneda, Kaiji Tang, Kentaro Tone, Shimba Tsuchiya, Yuichiro Umehara, Kazuki Ura, Natalie Van Sistine, Tony Weaver Jr., Michael Weidner, Anne Yatco, Miki Yoshikawa, and Young Bombs.

== Virtual Crunchyroll Expo ==
Due to the cancellation of Crunchyroll Expo 2020 because of the COVID-19 pandemic, an online event named Virtual Crunchyroll Expo was held from September 4–6, 2020. The event featured many Japanese guests including Junji Ito, Soma Saito, Rie Takahashi, Mayumi Tanaka, and pro wrestler Miro. It also included a artists alley, cosplay event, and exhibitor hall. Virtual Crunchyroll Expo 2021 was held from August 5–7, 2021 and also had a significant Japanese guest list.

== Crunchyroll Expo Australia ==
Crunchyroll Expo Australia was a two-day convention held during September at the Melbourne Convention and Exhibition Centre in Melbourne, Australia. The convention in 2022 had issues with long entrance lines outside of the convention center. Attendees had waits of up to five hours in bad weather due to the convention center reaching capacity. Crunchyroll after the convention made refunds available for those who could not enter the event.

=== Event history ===
Dates	Location	Atten.	Guests
September 17–18, 2022	Melbourne Convention and Exhibition Centre; Melbourne, Australia		Asca, Hakos Baelz, Mori Calliope, Ricco Fajardo, DJ Kazu, Kirilee, André Knite, Adam McArthur, Lisa Ortiz, Olivia Swasey, Kaiji Tang, Vye, and Anne Yatco.

== See also ==
- Crunchyroll
- FanimeCon
- SiliCon
