= Sucker for Love =

Sucker for Love may refer to:

- Sucker for Love: First Date, a 2022 horror/comedy visual novel
- Sucker for Love: Date to Die For, a 2024 horror/comedy visual novel
- "Sucker for Love" (song), a 2010 song by Swedish singer Pauline Kamusewu
