= Minato Aqua =

Hololive Japanese VTuber

- 湊あくあ
- Minato Aqua as designed by Gaou
- Born: 1 December
- Other names: Akutan, Onion, Ateishi
- Occupation: Virtual YouTuber

YouTube information
- Channel: Aqua Ch. 湊あくあ
- Years active: 2018–2024
- Genres: Livestreaming; Singing; Gaming
- Subscribers: 2.28 million
- Views: 500 million
- Last updated: 28 August 2024
- Website: hololive.hololivepro.com/en/talents/minato-aqua/

Minato Aqua (湊あくあ, Minato Akua) is a retired Japanese VTuber affiliated with Hololive Production from 8 August 2018 to 28 August 2024. She was part of Hololive's 2nd Generation. On 6 August 2024, she announced her "graduation" from Hololive, using terminology from the Japanese idol industry to refer to retirement, as is common among VTubers. Her graduation concert marking the end of her 6-year career, streamed on YouTube on 28 August, attracted 749,854 concurrent viewers, making it the most watched VTuber stream in history.

At the time of her graduation, Aqua had 2.24 million subscribers on her YouTube channel and was the 11th most popular VTuber according to the ranking site Userlocal.

== Career ==
On 14 July 2018, Hololive Productions put out a casting call for the virtual maid "Minato Aqua", with the character design done by the illustrator Gaou. Less than a month later, Minato Aqua debuted on YouTube as the first member of Hololive's 2nd Generation alongside Murasaki Shion, Nakiri Ayame, Yuzuki Choco, and Oozora Subaru.

Aqua's official character profile describes her as a marine-themed maid who can be awkward and clumsy, though fans know her as a shy introvert with exceptional gaming skills, particularly in Apex Legends.

Minato Aqua said that it was her childhood dream to be an idol, but thought it was impossible to achieve due to her self-stated lack of smarts, singing ability, and communication skills. She nonetheless applied for the Hololive auditions due to prospect of being able to stream from home. She cited Momoko Tsugunaga as her role model as an idol. On 21 August 2020, she held her first paid solo concert to celebrate her second anniversary, simulcast on Niconico and Bilibili. She was supposed to have a concert streamed from the Nissin Power Station on 2 August 2021, but the venue suffered a DDoS attack and an information security breach and was forced to cancel the concert. Aqua was able to hold the concert on 19 February from the same venue. She held a solo concert with a live audience at the Toyosu PIT on 28 January 2022.

Aqua's channel reached 1 million subscribers on 13 January 2021, making her the 8th VTuber (and 5th Hololive member) to reach this milestone. On 9 May 2024, her channel reached 2 million subscribers.

Aqua produced and starred in her own visual novel Aquarium, developed by Entergram and released for the Nintendo Switch and PlayStation 4 on 27 October 2022. For her Aquarium appearance, Minato Aqua won the 2022 Famitsu Award in the "Best Actor" category. The game received a Steam release with English localization in 2023. A sequel was announced in March 2024, but it was cancelled due to Aqua's graduation.

On 6 August 2024, Aqua announced that she would be 'graduating' from Hololive on 28 August, citing unspecified differences in opinion with the company. On the day of her graduation, she held a livestreamed concert on YouTube that gathered 749,854 concurrent viewers, breaking the previous record of 483,873 viewers set by fellow Hololive member Kiryu Coco's graduation stream in July 2021. Aqua's graduation stream was also noted for receiving US$237,571 in Superchat (YouTube donations) revenue, the second most of any stream in the VTuber industry after Coco's graduation stream.

"I am the type of person who thinks of the end when I start something. Ever since I joined Hololive, I've had the idea that I wanted to finish in a brilliant blaze. Just vaguely. When I think about it like that, I guess in a way, this graduation was also one of my dreams."

— Minato Aqua, during her graduation stream

== Activity ==
=== Games ===
- Azur Lane (2019)
- Neptunia Virtual Stars (2020)
- BanG Dream! Girls Band Party! (2021)
- Aquarium (2022)
- Sword Art Online: Last Recollection (2024)

=== Live ===
==== 2019 ====
- Niconico Chokaigi: Chou Bilibili Vup Stage (27 April 2019, Makuhari Messe)
- Bilibili World 2019 (17 August 2019, Guangzhou Poly World Trade Center; 4 October 2019, Shanghai New International Expo Center)
- VR Anime Festival 2019 (18 August 2019, Niconico livestream)

==== 2020 ====
- Hololive 1st Fes. Nonstop Story (hololive 1st Fes. 「ノンストップ・ストーリー」) (24 January 2020, Toyosu PIT)
- Aqua Iro Super Dream (21 August 2020, Niconico and Bilibili livestream) – pay-per-view solo concert
- Spice Live! (18 October 2020, YouTube livestream)
- Hololive 2nd fes. Beyond the Stage (2nd day) (22 December 2020) – pay-per-view livestream on Niconico and SPWN, sponsored by Bushiroad

==== 2021 ====
- VTuber Fes Japan 2021 DAY1 (30 January 2021, Kawaguchi Lilia)
- Bloom, hololive IDOL PROJECT 1st Live. (17 February 2021, Tokyo Garden Theater)
- Aqua Iro Super Miracle Dream (9 May 2021, YouTube livestream)
- Aqua Iro 3rd Anniversary Live (9 August 2021, YouTube livestream）

==== 2022 ====
- Aqua Iro in Wonderland (28 January 2022, Toyosu PIT)
- Minato Aqua Seaside Aqua Fes (19 February 2022, Nissin Power Station livestream)
- Hololive 3rd fes. Link Your Wish (2nd Day) (20 March 2022, Makuhari Messe, SPWN/Niconico) – co-sponsored by Weiß Schwarz and others

==== 2023 ====
- Hololive 4th fes. Our Bright Parade (2nd Day) (19 March 2023, Makuhari Messe, SPWN) – sponsored by Bushiroad
- Dreamy Day (15 August 2023, YouTube livestream)
- hololive Summer 2023 3DLIVE Splash Party! (27 August 2023, YouTube livestream)

==== 2024 ====
- Hololive 5th fes. Capture the Moment (2nd day) (17 March 2024, Makuhari Messe, SPWN) – sponsored by Bushiroad
- Minato Aqua Graduation Live (28 August 2024, YouTube livestream)

== Discography ==
=== Singles ===
Title	Year	Peak chart positions		Notes
Title	Year	JPN DS	JPN DL	Notes
"#aqua iro palette" (#あくあ色ぱれっと)	2020	19	14	
"Kaisou Ressha" (海想列車)	2021	40	39	
"aqua iro palette"	2021	—	—	English version of #aqua iro palette
"Kira Kira" (きらきら)	2021	—	59	
"uni-birth"	2021	—	66	
"aqutan no koto sukisugi☆song" (あくたんのこと好きすぎ☆ソング)	2022	42	31	
"For The Win (2022 ver.)"	2022	—	51	
"I wanna" (あいわな)	2022	—	46	
"Stay Blue" (未だ、青い)	2022	28	27	Theme song of Aquarium
"Let me be your SAIOSHI!" (君の最推しにしてよ！)	2022	—	49	
"Girl loved by Aim" (エイムに愛されしガール)	2023	—	58	
"princess carry" (プリンセス・キャリー)	2024	—	—	
"Strategic Love" (恋愛ストラテジック)	2024	—	59	
"kizuna to kiseki with hololive JP" (キズナトキセキ with hololive JP)	2024	10	12	Features all members of the main Hololive branch as of 28 August 2024
"kimiiro princess" (#きみいろプリンセス)	2024	15	18	
"—" denotes releases that did not chart or were not released in that region.

=== Extended plays ===
Title	Release date	Track listing	Peak chart positions
Title	Release date	Track listing	JPN Dg.
aqutan no koto sukisugi☆song/ For The Win (2022 ver.) (あくたんのこと好きすぎ☆ソング /For The Win (2022 ver.))	Release date: 24 January 2022; Format: Digital download; Catalog No.: CVRD-121	1. aqutan no koto sukisugi☆song 2. For The Win (2022 ver.); 3. aqutan no koto sukisugi☆song (Instrumental); 4. For The Win (2022 ver.) (Instrumental)	—
♡aquatime select♡ (♡あくあたいむ・せれくと♡)	Release date: 28 January 2022; Format: CD, digital download; Catalog No.: CVRD-122	1. KAISSOU RESSHA; 2. I wanna 3. uni-birth 4. Kira Kira	17

=== Collaborative works ===
Release date	Product name	Credited as	Tracks	Notes
30 October 2020	Curry Meshi Is a Miracle (カレーメシ・イン・ミラクル)	Spice Love	Curry Meshi Is a Miracle; Curry Meshi Is a Miracle - Ayato Shinozaki Remix; Curry Meshi Is a Miracle - Loid's Gobunkei Remix	Collaboration with Nissin Curry Meshi, sung with Usada Pekora and Oozora Subaru
18 December 2020	Hacha-Mecha Miracle (Hacha-Mecha ミラクル)	Spice Love	Hacha-Mecha Miracle	Collaboration with Nissin Curry Meshi, sung with Usada Pekora and Oozora Subaru
1 September 2021	Tsumari wa Itsuma Kujikenai! (つまりはいつもくじけない！)	NEGI☆U	Tsumari wa Itsuma Kujikenai!	First ending song of the television anime The Great Jahy Will Not Be Defeated!, sung with Oozora Subaru and Momosuzu Nene
1 September 2021	Tsumari wa Itsuma Kujikenai! (つまりはいつもくじけない！)	NEGI☆U	MAKE UP TRUE! (めいくあっぷとぅるぅ！)	Sung with Oozora Subaru and Momosuzu Nene
19 September 2021	Domination! All the World Is an Ocean (浸食!! 地球全域全おーしゃん)	UMISEA	Domination! All the World Is an Ocean	Sung with Houshou Marine, Gawr Gura, and Ninomae Ina'nis
1 June 2022	NEGI☆U NO PANAIUTA (ねぎゆーのパないうた)	NEGI☆U	1. PANIGHT; 2. Doyatto “V” Peace (ドヤっとVピース☆); 3. NANDEDAMENAN? (ナンデダメナン？); 4. Yokubari Cute Girl (よくばりキュートガール)	Sung with Oozora Subaru and Momosuzu Nene
13 August 2022	Kokuhaku Jikkō Iinkai -FLYING SONGS- -Koishiteru- (告白実行委員会 -FLYING SONGS- 恋してる)	HoneyWorks feat.Minato Aqua	Heroine wa heikin ika (ヒロインは平均以下。)	Part of the Kokuhaku Jikkō Iinkai: Ren'ai Series
29 August 2022	It Comes Ryuuu And It Goes Kyuuu (りゅーーっときてきゅーーっ!!!)	UMISEA	It Comes Ryuuu And It Goes Kyuuu	Sung with Houshou Marine, Sakamata Chloe, Gawr Gura, and Ninomae Ina'nis
3 May 2023	UMISEA no SACHIHAPPY! (うみシーのさちハピ！)	UMISEA	UMISEA no SACHIHAPPY!	Sung with Houshou Marine, Sakamata Chloe, Gawr Gura, and Ninomae Ina'nis
19 May 2023	Sushi Desho! (寿司☆でしょ！)	NEGI☆U	Sushi Desho!	Sung with Oozora Subaru and Momosuzu Nene
14 August 2023	Ocean wave Party☆Live (おーしゃんうぇーぶ・Party☆らぃ)	UMISEA	Ocean wave Party☆Live	Sung with Houshou Marine, Sakamata Chloe, Gawr Gura, and Ninomae Ina'nis

== Awards and nominations ==
Year	Ceremony	Category	Result	Work	Ref.
2022	Famitsu Awards	Best Actor	Won	Aquarium	
