= Ninomae Ina'nis =

VTuber and illustrator

- Ninomae Ina'nis as designed by Kuroboshi Kouhaku
- Occupations: VTuber; illustrator

YouTube information
- Channel: Ninomae Ina'nis Ch. hololive-EN
- Years active: 2020–present
- Genres: Livestreaming; drawing; gaming
- Subscribers: 1.65 million
- Views: 193 million
- Last updated: May 20, 2026
- Website: hololive.hololivepro.com/en/talents/ninomae-inanis/

Ninomae Ina'nis (Japanese: 一伊那尓栖, Hepburn: Ninomae Inanisu), nicknamed "Ina", is a VTuber and illustrator affiliated with Hololive Production. She debuted as part of Hololive English's first generation "Myth" on September 13, 2020. Her livestreams consist of her playing video games, chatting with viewers, collaborating with other VTubers, singing karaoke, and drawing art. She released her first EP, Re:Vision, in 2026.

== Overview ==
Ninomae debuted as a member of Hololive English's first generation "Myth", alongside Gawr Gura, Mori Calliope, Watson Amelia, and Takanashi Kiara. Myth's lore is that of four characters inspired by mythological creatures being investigated by a detective (Watson, in reference to Dr. Watson). In Ninomae's fictional lore, she is a priestess to the ancient ones who can control tentacles, which she finds normal and which she enjoys dressing up. In her lore, she gained this power after reading a strange book; after hearing ancient whispers, she began activity as a VTuber to keep humanity sane. Her character looks like a Japanese idol, except her front bangs are tentacles and flaps akin to those on the dumbo octopus are attached to her head, which is also surrounded by a halo. Her character was designed by Kuroboshi Kouhaku, an illustrator with an affinity for Lovecraft and octopuses. Her character's original rigging was done by rariemonn. Her character's birthday is May 20.

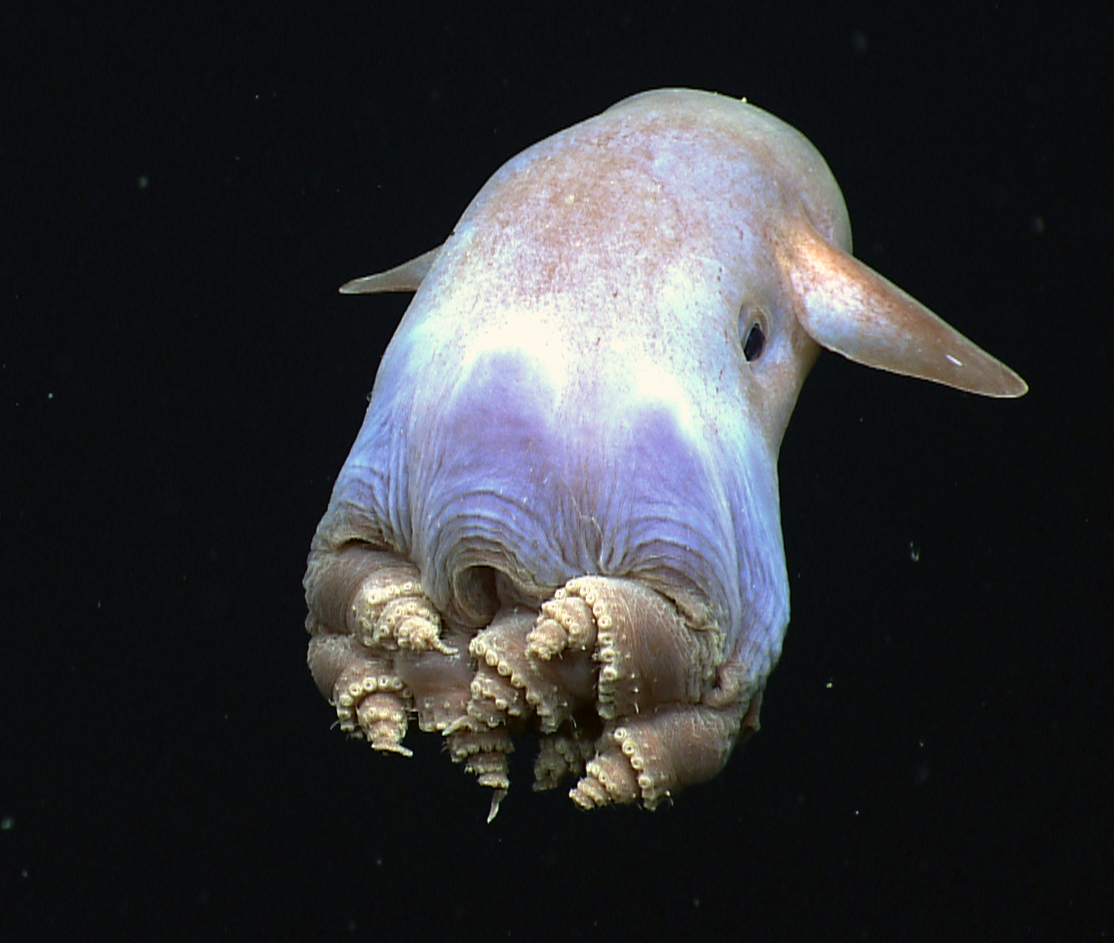
Ninomae's character has flaps on her head, as does the dumbo octopus (pictured).

Ninomae's livestreams consist of her playing video games, chatting with viewers, collaborating with other VTubers, singing karaoke, and drawing art. She begins all of her streams with her signature catchphrase, "Wah!". She often makes puns. Ninomae is a professional illustrator. She is also trilingual, able to speak English, Japanese, and Korean.

== Career ==
On September 13, 2020, Ninomae debuted as part of Myth. On May 27, 2021, Ninomae reached 1 million subscribers on YouTube; she was the 4th member of Myth to do so. One piece of art Ninomae has illustrated is titled Do VTubers Dream of Colorful Tomorrows?, a reference to Do Androids Dream of Electric Sheep? and through that the discourse surrounding the humanity of VTubers. She won the Best Art Vtuber award at the 2023 Vtuber Awards. On July 5, 2025, Ninomae featured for Major League Baseball's Los Angeles Dodgers during a game at Dodger Stadium with VTubers IRyS and Koseki Bijou; they sang "Take Me Out to the Ball Game" during the seventh-inning stretch.

Ninomae's first original song, "Violet", was released on August 4, 2021. The song was composed by Seibin, had string arrangements by Benicx, and was written by Lumina, who also produced an accompanying music video which was illustrated by Ninomae. On December 2, Ninomae released her first cover, "Tabi no Tochū" from Spice and Wolf. Ninomae was a part of the music group Umisea, which centered on Hololive members with oceanic themes. As a part of Umisea, she first worked with the Japanese musician Camellia. Camellia praised Ninomae's vocals and she provided them on "Drenched in Air", a song from his album Ashed Wings molded around her. On February 18, 2023, Ninomae had her first official solo live performance, where she debuted her 3D model, which was created by Rei Amagai, and which peaked at over 63,000 concurrent viewers. Following this, she had her first appearance on the Holo no Grafitti (Hologra) video series with the video "Eat or Be EaTentacle".

On December 9, Ninomae hosted her second official solo live performance, a belated birthday celebration. During the live, she first performed her second original song, "Meconopsis"; it was arranged and composed by M2U and written by Wunder Riku, who included many references in it. Her third single, "Temari", released on December 29, 2024, and had the same production team as "Violet". On January 7, 2026, Ninomae's fourth single "Tako∞Takover" was released; it was written by Mori and produced by Aiobahn +81. On February 2, 2026, Ninomae released her first extended play, Re:Vision, for which she created the cover art. It includes the four aforementioned singles as well as the songs "Takodachi no Uta" and "Abyssal Hymn", which together form a cohesive narrative; in an interview with Anime Trending, Ninomae said that the narrative's direction had come together while working on "Temari". She also released the single "Stardust Capsule" for Hololive Dreams in 2026.

Ninomae's fans are known as Takodachis, a portmanteau of tako (Japanese: 蛸, 'octopus') and tomodachi (Japanese: ともだち, 'friend'). In May 2021, to celebrate Ninomae's birthday, they had a 60 second tribute video displayed on a billboard in Times Square seven times an hour. The billboard was located next to a local Taco Bell, a reference to Ninomae's affinity for "tako" puns, and it rotated through 99 fan arts and 4 animated sequences that had been selected from over 400 submissions. This predated the popularization of fan billboards in the United States and triggered their popularization in VTuber communities, although it had already been popular in Japan. Motoaki Tanigo, the CEO of Hololive Production's parent company, Cover Corporation, named the billboard as the most surprising thing he had seen during his tenure. To celebrate Ninomae's birthday in 2022, the Takodachis assembled a 342-page artbook, aided by Lumina.

In May 2024, Ninomae was added to the Hololive fan game Idol Showdown. She recorded most of her lines in the game, although some were taken from clips of her stream, such as a clip of her voice cracking while saying "tomorrow!". The game includes numerous references to Ninomae and her stream, such as her 'threats' to bonk viewers with a crowbar, her character primarily fighting with a paintbrush, and her final move, "Forbidden INKantation", is based on a popular fan animation. The game features mixes of two of Ninomae's songs: "Wahoy", a mix of "Violet" and the Houshou Marine song "Ahoy!"; and "Violet Blossom", a mix of "Meconopsis" and the Ninomae-commissioned Camellia song "Kanalumi".

Ninomae has performed at multiple concerts. She performed at Hololive English's first concert "Connect the World" hosted at YouTube Theater on July 2, 2023. She performed at Hololive English's second concert "Breaking Dimensions" hosted at Kings Theatre from August 25–26, 2024. She performed at Hololive English's third concert "All For One" hosted at Radio City Music Hall from August 23–24, 2025. She performed at the "Drawn to Dawn" concert, hosted at the Wiltern Theatre and co-headlined with Takanashi, from March 27–28, 2026. She has also performed at multiple Hololive Festivals ("HoloFes" or "fes.").

In September and October 2021, Ninomae appeared at Fan Expo Boston and Fan Expo Canada as part of Hololive English's North American tour. She also appeared at Crunchyroll Expo in August 2022. In August 2023, she appeared at AniRevo. In August 2024, she performed at a concert at Anime NYC. In November 2024, she appeared at Anime Festival Asia Singapore.

== Discography ==
=== Extended play ===
Title	EP details	Peak chart positions			Sales
Title	EP details	JPN	JPN Dig.	JPN DL	Sales
Re:Vision	Released: February 2, 2026; Label: Cover Corp; Formats: CD, digital download, streaming	23	26	38	JPN: 2,203

=== Singles ===
==== As lead artist ====
Title	Year	Album
"Violet"	2021	Re:Vision
"Meconopsis"	2024	Re:Vision
"Temari"	2024	Re:Vision
"Kurukuru Cruise" (with Nekomata Okayu)	2025	Non-album single
"Tako∞Takover"	2026	Re:Vision
"Stardust Capsule" (星屑カプセル)	2026	Non-album single

==== As collaborative artist ====
Title	Year	Peak chart positions	Album
Title	Year	JPN DL	Album
"Domination! All the World Is an Ocean" (浸食!! 地球全域全おーしゃん) (as Umisea)	2021	59	Non-album singles
"Journey Like a Thousand Years" (as Hololive English -Myth-)	2022	—	Non-album singles
"It Comes Ryuuu and It Goes Kyuuu" (りゅーーっときてきゅーーっ!!!) (as Umisea)	2022	47	Non-album singles
"Non-Fiction" (as Hololive English -Myth-)	2022	—	Non-album singles
"Umisea no Sachihappy!" (うみシーのさちハピ！) (as Umisea)	2023	—	Non-album singles
"Connect the World" (as Hololive English)	2023	—	Non-album singles
"Ocean Wave・Party☆Live" (おーしゃんうぇーぶ・Party☆らぃ) (as Umisea)	2023	85	Non-album singles
"ReUnion" (as Hololive English -Myth-)	2024	—	Non-album singles
"Breaking Dimensions" (as Hololive English)	2024	—	Non-album singles
"The Show Goes On!" (as Hololive English -Myth-)	2024	—	Non-album singles
"Odyssey" (as Hololive English)	2024	—	Non-album singles
"Monster" (with Ouro Kronii, Shiori Novella and Gigi Murin)	2025	—	Non-album singles
"All for One" (as Hololive English)	2025	—	Non-album singles
"Kirameki Rider (English ver.)" (as Hololive English -Myth- and -Promise-)	2025	—	Non-album singles
"Fortune Spinner" (as Hololive English -Myth-)	2025	—	Non-album singles
"This is Myth" (as Hololive English -Myth-)	2026	—	Non-album singles
"—" denotes releases that did not chart.

== Awards and nominations ==
Ceremony	Year	Category	Result	Ref.
The Vtuber Awards	2023	Best Art VTuber	Won	
The Vtuber Awards	2024	Best Art VTuber	Nominated	

== Bibliography ==
- Greenfield-Casas, Stefan (November 6, 2025). "Limelight of the Idols: Voice, Virtuality, VTubers". Kieler Beiträge zur Filmmusikforschung. 19. Kiel Society for Film Music Research: 59–79. doi:10.59056/kbzf.2025.19.p59-79. ISSN 1866-4768.
