= Hakos Baelz =

Australian VTuber and singer

- ハコス・ベールズ
- Hakos Baelz as designed by Mika Pikazo
- Born: Australia
- Other names: Bae, Hakotaro
- Occupation: VTuber

YouTube information
- Channel: Hakos Baelz Ch. hololive
- Years active: 2021–present
- Subscribers: 1.22 million
- Views: 282 million
- Last updated: 12 October 2026
- Website: hololivepro.com

Hakos Baelz (Japanese: ハコス・ベールズ) is an Australian VTuber and singer affiliated with Hololive Production. She debuted on 23 August 2021. Hakos has released two albums, Zodiac (2024) and Mirror Mirror (2026).

== Career ==
Hakos Baelz debuted on 23 August 2021 as part of Hololive English's second generation "Council". She later became part of the unit Hololive Promise. Her character was designed by Mika Pikazo and it features rat-like ears and a tail. In her lore, she is described as the embodiment of chaos. Hakos is an anagram of khaos. Her fans are referred to as "brats".

Hakos reached one million subscribers on YouTube on 12 December 2024. In October 2023, it was announced that Hakos had been made a brand ambassador for VRChat. Hakos voice acted in the 2026 visual novel Sucker for Love: Crush Landing. She had previously livestreamed herself playing its prequels, Sucker for Love: First Date and Sucker for Love: Date to Die For. In addition to livestreaming herself chatting and playing video games, such as the Yakuza series, Hakos also releases music.

Some fans cosplay as Hakos Baelz.

In interviews, Hakos said that she mostly listened to J-pop, K-pop, and anime songs in her youth due to her family's influence, naming Ayumi Hamasaki as one artist that she listened to a lot. She released her first single, "Play Dice", on 27 February 2022. She cowrote it with Camellia, who also composed it. She released the extended play Pandæmonium on 7 July 2023, which charted at 19 on the Oricon Digital Albums Chart. Pandæmonium was supported by the electronic dance single "Psycho", which has lyrics by Zaq and was composed by Tom Hack. She released the single "Bite! Kamu! Bite!" with Inugami Korone in November 2023. In December 2023, she performed at the esports event Riot Games ONE with three other Hololive members. Hakos released her first album, Zodiac, on 1 March 2024, which is themed around the Chinese zodiac.

She choreographed and wrote the lyrics for the single "Snake Eyes". At the Serendipity concert in July 2026 she performed with IRyS, as the duo BaeRyS. She performed at the outdoor music festival LuckyFes in August 2026, alongside Houshou Marine. Hakos had previously performed with Houshou at other concerts. Her second album, Mirror Mirror, released on 2 November 2026. Her first individual concert, Regalia, is set to take place at Kanadevia Hall on 1 December 2026.

== Personal life ==
Hakos is Australian and was born in Australia. In addition to English, she is fluent in Japanese, from school and practice, and Cantonese, via her family. She also has some fluency in Korean, from school and practice. Hakos moved to Japan in January 2024. Hakos dislikes tea and prefers coffee. A 2026 Routledge study identified this and her comedic opposition to tea enjoyers as an exemplar of the comedy made possible by the disparity between VTubers and their characters.

== Discography ==
=== Studio albums ===
| Title | Details | Peak chart positions | | Sales |
| Title | Details | JPN | JPN Hot | Sales |
|---|---|---|---|---|
| Zodiac | Released: 1 March 2024; Label: Cover Corp.; Formats: CD, digital download, streaming | — (Note: Zodiac did not enter the Oricon Albums Chart, but peaked at number 16 on the Oricon Digital Albums Chart.) | 80 | JPN: 350 (digital) |
| Mirror Mirror | Released: 2 November 2026; Label: Cover Corp.; Formats: CD, digital download, streaming | 56 | — (Note: Mirror Mirror did not enter the Billboard Japan Hot Albums chart, but peaked at number 16 on the Download Albums chart.) | JPN: 221 (digital) |
"—" denotes releases that did not chart.

=== Extended plays ===
| Title | Details | Peak chart position | Sales |
| Title | Details | JPN Dig. | Sales |
|---|---|---|---|
| Pandæmonium | Released: 7 July 2023; Label: Cover Corp.; Formats: Digital download, streaming | 19 | JPN: 239 (digital) |

=== Singles ===
==== As lead artist ====
| Title | Year | Album |
|---|---|---|
| "Play Dice" | 2022 | Non-album single |
| "Sweet Appetite" (with Gawr Gura) | 2023 | Holo*27 Originals Vol. 1 |
| "Play Dice! (TeddyLoid Re-Arrangement)" | 2023 | Non-album single |
| "Psycho" | 2023 | Pandæmonium |
| "Bite! Kamu! Bite!" (BITE! カム! BITE!) (with Inugami Korone) | 2023 | Zodiac |
| "Hide & Seek 〜Nakayoku Kenkashina〜" (HIDE & SEEK 〜なかよくケンカしな！〜) (with Usada Pekora) | | Zodiac |
| "Feast" | 2025 | Non-album single |
| "Snake Eyes" | 2026 | Mirror Mirror |
| "I Found Me" | 2026 | Mirror Mirror |

==== As collaborative artist ====
| Title | Year |
|---|---|
| "Rise" (as Hololive English Council) | 2022 |
| "Connect the World" (as Hololive English) | 2023 |
| "Our Promise" (as Hololive English Promise) | 2024 |
| "Breaking Dimensions" (as Hololive English) | 2024 |
| "Odyssey" (as Hololive English) | 2024 |
| "We Go!" (ウィーゴー!) (with Hiroshi Kitadani, Takanashi Kiara, and Kobo Kanaeru) | 2025 |
| "We Go! (Hololive ver.)" (ウィーゴー!~hololive ver.~) (with Shirakami Fubuki, Houshou Marine, Tsunomaki Watame, Takanashi Kiara, and Kobo Kanaeru) | 2025 |
| "All For One" (as Hololive English) | 2025 |
| "Kirameki Rider (English ver.)" (as Hololive English Myth and Promise) | 2025 |
| "Run Back 'Round" (as Hololive English Promise) | 2025 |
| "Freaky Deaky Love" (with Takanashi Kiara, Koseki Bijou, and Raora Panthera) | 2026 |
| "Serendipity" (as Hololive English) | 2026 |
| "Here Comes the CHADCast" (with Mori Calliope and IRyS) | 2026 |
| "La Mascarade" (as Hololive Promise) | 2026 |
