= Inugami Korone =

Japanese VTuber

- 戌神ころね
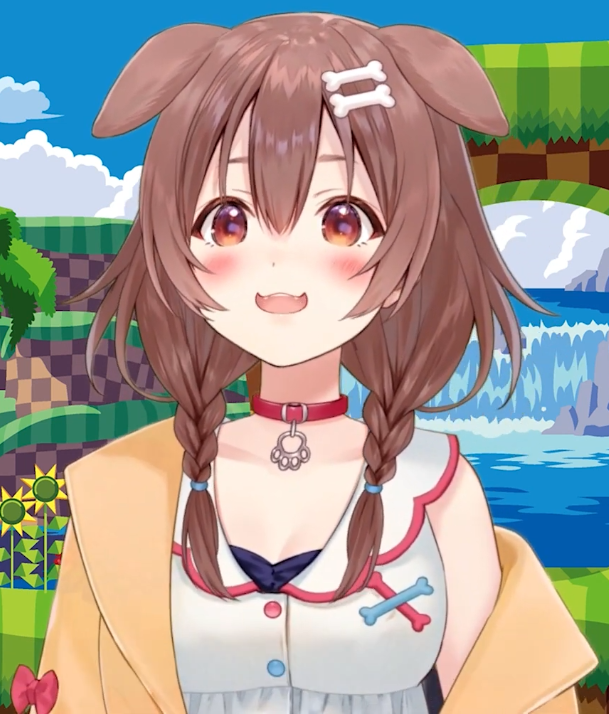
- Inugami Korone as designed by Fukahire
- Occupation: VTuber

YouTube information
- Channel: Korone Ch. 戌神ころね
- Years active: 2019–present
- Subscribers: 2.28 million
- Views: 502 million
- Inugami's voice Inugami introduces herself Published 19 October 2021
- Last updated: June 28, 2026
- Website: https://hololive.hololivepro.com/en/talents/inugami-korone/

Inugami Korone (Japanese: 戌神ころね) is a Japanese VTuber affiliated with Hololive Production. She debuted as a part of Hololive Gamers on April 13, 2019.

== Career ==
Inugami Korone debuted on April 13, 2019, as a part of Hololive Gamers. Hololive Gamers other members are Shirakami Fubuki, Ookami Mio, and Nekomata Okayu. Inugami often collaborates with Nekomata, who she has been friends with since before they joined Hololive. Nekomata joined Hololive before Inugami and gave the company a job recommendation for her. They are referred to together as "OkaKoro". Hololive Gamers members' livestreams on YouTube primarily focus on playing video games.

Inugami's fictional lore describes her as a dog from a city bakery who enjoys playing games when not watchdogging. Her character was designed by Fukahire. Her fans are called Koronesuki (Japanese for Korone lovers). Inugami uses the catchphrase yubi! yubi! (指! 指!; lit. 'finger! finger!'), a reference to the practice of finger amputation (yubitsume), calling for her fans to cut off their fingers and give them to her.

While most members of Hololive primarily play recently released video games and multiplayer video games, Inugami also often plays retro games. She also plays horror and indie games. She sometimes does incredibly long "endurance" streams, occasionally exceeding 24 hours in length. She also collaborates with Sakura Miko, a member of Hololive's 0th generation, on streams that run for 24 hours straight. In October 2020, Inugami reached 1 million subscribers on YouTube. She was the first member of Hololive Japan, second member of Hololive (after Hololive English's Gawr Gura), and fourth VTuber to do so. She reached 2 million subscribers on June 28, 2023. She was the fourth member of Hololive Japan to do so.

While Inugami is a native Japanese speaker and primarily streams in Japanese, a portion of her audience is non-Japanese. In 2020, Inugami played the 1985 video game Super Mario Bros. in livestreams targeted at this audience, challenging herself to only speak English during the stream. Retro video game reviewer Stuart Gipp called the streams an "utter delight" and said that they "transformed the way I look at Super Mario Bros."

In April 2020, Inugami played the 1993 video game Doom and its 2016 reboot. Gipp made note of her reactions in the 1993 game to eviscerating enemies in the game with a chainsaw and her battle cries, which he compared to those of Vikings. Her playthrough of the 2016 reboot became popular, with Ian Walker of Kotaku suggesting it was because of the "combination of the game’s over-the-top violence and a cute, cackling avatar". Inugami and her fans dubbed the playthroughs "Doog", a play on the game's name and her dog character, with "Doog" also being incorporated into Inugami's YouTube branding. In October 2020, the 2016 reboot's sequel Doom Eternal added an easter egg to Inugami. In the game, clicking the chainsaw button a series of time would change the game's logo from "Doom Eternal" to "Doog Eternal" until the game was restarted. The easter egg was eventually removed, with the patch notes declaring "The DOOG easter egg has been removed, but will live in infamy."

On August 25, 2020, during a live playthrough of Banjo-Kazooie, she uttered the phrase "Eekum Bokum" while trying to imitate the voice of the game's Mumbo Token. This became an internet meme and gained popularity outside of Japan. Grant Kirkhope, composer of the Banjo-Kazooie soundtrack, praised her stream and shared it on Twitter.

Inugami also does more traditional idol activities, with Jin Sugiyama of Real Sound applauding her dancing skills and calling her first original song distinctly her own. In September 2023, Inugami released the single "Kawaiko Check!" as part of a collaboration with HoneyWorks, and in November 2023 she released the single "Bite! Kamu! Bite!" with Hakos Baelz.

Inugami is an ambassador for the Sega property Sonic the Hedgehog, with Inugami voice acting in the Japanese dub of Sonic the Hedgehog 2, having downloadable content themed after her released in Sonic Frontiers, receiving a special Sonic-themed Live2D model and stream backdrop, and her song "Hongami Precious Moment" appearing in Sonic Racing: CrossWorlds. She also voice acted in an episode of the anime Yo-kai Watch. She is the ambassador for Honda Racing eMS, an esports competition that takes place in Gran Turismo 7. Inugami is a fan of horror and B movies. In 2025, she interviewed 28 Years Later director Danny Boyle and writer Alex Garland as part of a promotion for the film.

== Reception ==
Gipp said that the contrast of Inugami's cute aesthetic and ultraviolence in the video games she plays, while unoriginal, had charmed him due to her humor and good timing. He noted in particular the juxtaposition in the "macabre" meaning of "yubi yubi", which he called bizarre, and her moe status.

== Discography ==
=== Singles ===
==== As lead artist ====
Title	Year	Peak chart positions		Album
Title	Year	JPN Dig.	JPN DL	Album
"Saikyo Tensai Wanderful World of Korone" (ころねの最凶天災☆わんだふぉー♡わーるど)	2021	34	19	Non-album singles
"Mikkorone x Showtime!!" (みっころね×しょうたいむ‼︎) (with Sakura Miko)	2022	—	18	Non-album singles
"Doggy God's Street"	2022	—	22	Non-album singles
"Wonky Monkey"	2023	—	40	Non-album singles
"Kawaiko Check!" (かわいこちぇっく！) (collaboration with HoneyWorks)	2023	—	—	Holohoneygaoka High School -Originals-
"Bite! Kamu! Bite!" (BITE! カム! BITE!) (with Hakos Baelz)	2023	—	—	Zodiac
"Trouble "Wan"der!"	2024	—	99	Non-album singles
"Mad Popcorn World!"	2024	—	—	Non-album singles
"Hongami Precious Moment" (with Tomoya Ohtani)	2024	—	—	Non-album singles
"Mikkorone x Yatteyanyo!!" (みっころね×やってやんよ!!) (with Sakura Miko)	2024	—	—	Non-album singles
"MafiosA" (マフィオーザ)	2025	—	100	Non-album singles
"—" denotes releases that did not chart.

==== As Hololive Gamers ====
Title	Year	Peak chart positions
Title	Year	JPN Dig.
"We are Gamers!!!!"	2024	40
"To Be Continued...."	2025	40
