= TeddyLoid =

Japanese DJ and music producer

TeddyLoid 榊原良
- Born: Teddy Sakakibara; August 23, 1989 (age 37); Hamamatsu, Japan
- Genres: J-pop, EDM, electronic
- Years active: 2008–present
- Label: Evil Line
- Website: www.teddyloid.com

Teddy Sakakibara (Japanese: 榊原良, Hepburn: Sakakibara Teddy; born August 23, 1989), known professionally as TeddyLoid, is a Japanese DJ and music producer. He is known for producing several songs in the soundtrack of Panty & Stocking with Garterbelt, which charted on Oricon Albums Chart. He is also known for partnering with Daoko in "ME!ME!ME!", an anime music video submitted to the 2014 Japan Animator Expo.

== Career ==
TeddyLoid's career began by publishing remixes on MySpace, where he gained popularity and climbed to the top of the platform's electronic indie chart. In 2008, he toured internationally as Miyavi's background DJ in the guitarist's This Iz The Japanese Kabuki Rock Tour 2008.

TeddyLoid's first partnership with Taku Takahashi came when Takahashi founded his record label, TCY Records. In the record label's debut album, TCY Recordings Sampler Vol. 0, TeddyLoid produced the song "Another Day". The two then worked together on the soundtrack for the anime series Panty & Stocking with Garterbelt, with TeddyLoid producing multiple songs. The soundtrack album, Panty & Stocking with Garterbelt The Original Soundtrack, reached 10th on the Oricon Albums Chart, while its follow-up album Panty & Stocking with Garterbelt The Worst Album also reached 24th. In 2011, he formed Galaxias! along with vocalist Ko Shibasaki and music producer Deco*27. The three produced one album titled Galaxias! and toured Japan, including a concert at Nippon Budokan.

On 17 September 2014, TeddyLoid released his debut album, Black Moon Rising. Then, for the 2014 Japan Animator Expo, TeddyLoid produced the music for an anime music video "ME!ME!ME!", which was visualized by Hibiki Yoshizaki from Studio Khara and vocals sang by Daoko. The music was written in three parts, and the video, notable for its sexual violence content, featured a male protagonist in a surreal-psychedelic setting while surrounded by nude women, which became a viral hit with over 100 million views on YouTube. A follow-up remix titled "Me!Me!Me! Chronic" was released in May 2015. In 2015, TeddyLoid partnered with Momoiro Clover Z and released Re:Momoiro Clover Z, which featured remixes of the idol group's songs and has also composed two of his own VOCALOID originals, including "Over Drive", "Invisible Lovers" and "ULTRA C". He then released Silent Planet later the same year and began releasing a series of follow-up extended plays under the same title. Each release featured different artists including Kohh, Bonjour Suzuki, Chanmina, Aina the End, and IA. The series then cumulated in two albums, Silent Planet: Reloaded and Silent Planet: Infinity.

In 2016, TeddyLoid was the fifth most-listened-to Japanese artist outside of Japan on Spotify. In 2018, he worked with virtual YouTuber Kizuna AI to produce the single "melty world", which he later remixed himself in 2020 to create a "black" version of the title to sound like it was sung by Kizuna AI's cynical alternate ego, Kizuna AI Black. In 2016, he debuted in Australia, headlining for the popular Anime Rave Event, Neko Nation. February 17, 2018, TeddyLoid made his first American performance in Milwaukee, Wisconsin, as a DJ for a concert at Anime Milwaukee. He returns to Australia in 2026 for the collaboration Neko Nation and Mirai Nights tour in Brisbane and Sydney.

In 2021, he began collaborating with music producer Giga, who considers themselves to have opposite strengths, with Giga composing delicate melodies and precise tracks and Teddyloid composing dynamic sounds over a wide range of genres. Their first major song together was "Odo", a single for Ado. Their other collaborations include "The Struggle is Real" (feat. Meme Tokyo), "KIKIKAIKAI" (feat. Yuzu), "Let's End the World" (feat. Mori Calliope), "Desperate" (feat. LOLUET), "Show" (also feat. Ado), “Clutch” (feat. Irregular Dice), "Let Me Battle" (feat. 9Lana), "Go-Getters" (also featuring Mori Calliope), "ULTRA C" (feat. Kagamine Rin & Len), "Knock It Out!" (feat. Amane Kanata), "POW POW" (feat. ELSEE), "Upboomboom" (feat. MYERA), "Act" (feat. Daoko), "Pikaaan!" (feat. Rina Matsuda & Hikaru Morita of Sakurazaka46), "Awake" (feat. Hoshimachi Suisei), "Violetta" (feat. Chogakusei) and "Monstruo" (also feat. Ado).

In 2022, he made his debut in the rhythm game Arcaea with the song "Defection", with DELTA on vocals for the pack Final Verdict. In 2024, he released "Gimme Dat" on Tokyo Machine's label CHOMPO and produced two arrangements for the soundtrack of the game Shadow Generations. In 2025, he contributed to the original soundtrack of the Netflix original series Glass Heart, and composed the soundtrack for the anime series Tojima Wants to Be a Kamen Rider.

== Discography ==
=== Albums ===
Release date	Title	Chart positions		Certifications
Release date	Title	Oricon Weekly Albums Chart	Billboard Japan Hot 100	Certifications
27 August 2014	Black Moon Rising	223	—N/a	
16 September 2015	Re:Momoiro Clover Z	12	12	
2 December 2015	Silent Planet	124	–	
11 November 2018	Silent Planet:Reloaded	–	–	
28 November 2018	Silent Planet:Infinity	–	–	
4 October 2017	TV ANIME [18if] Album	–	–	
14 February 2019	Fight League Gear Gadget Generators Original Motion Picture Soundtracks	–	–	

=== Extended plays ===
Release date	Title	Chart positions		Certifications
Release date	Title	Oricon Weekly Albums Chart	Billboard Japan Hot 100	Certifications
27 August 2014	Under the Black Moon	299	–	
28 July 2016	Silent Planet 2 EP Vol.1 (feat. Kohh)	–	–	
16 September 2016	Silent Planet 2 EP Vol.2 (feat. Bonjour Suzuki)	–	–	
4 November 2016	Silent Planet 2 EP Vol.3 (feat. Chanmina and Daoko)	–	–	
17 March 2017	Silent Planet 2 EP Vol.4 (feat. Aina the End)	–	–	
24 November 2017	Silent Planet 2 EP Vol.5 (feat. IA)	–	–	
15 December 2017	Silent Planet 2 EP Vol.6 (feat. Yoshikazu Mera)	–	–	

=== Singles ===
Release date	Title	Chart positions		Notes
Release date	Title	Oricon Weekly Albums Chart	Billboard Japan Hot 100	Notes
22 June 2016	"Pipo Password" (feat. Bonjour Suzuki)	118	–	Ending theme of Space Patrol Luluco
4 November 2016	"Daikirai" (feat. Chanmina)			Silent Planet 2 EP Vol. 3
9 November 2018	"You Made Me" (feat. Chanmina)			Silent Planet Reloaded
13 February 2024	"Gimme Dat"			

=== Other notable works ===
Release date	Title	Notes
30 October 2013	"Over Drive" (feat. IA)	
21 November 2014	"ME!ME!ME!" (feat. Daoko)	Submission to the 2014 Japan Animator Expo
1 May 2015	"ME!ME!ME! Chronic" (feat. Daoko)	
1 June 2015	"Shooting Star" (feat. IA)	
24 November 2017	"Invisible Lovers" (feat. IA)	
7 July 2018	"Red Doors" (feat. Yoshikazu Mera)	Opening theme of 18if
30 November 2018	"melty world" (feat. Kizuna AI)	Kizuna AI collaboration single
27 November 2020	"Neo-Neon" (with Deco*27 feat. Hatsune Miku)	
16 December 2020	"After Rain" (with JUVENILE feat. claquepot)	Single for INTERWEAVE
27 April 2021	"Odo" (with Giga feat. Ado)	
25 June 2021	"Ojamamushi II" (with Deco*27 feat. Hatsune Miku)	
29 July 2021	"The Struggle is Real" (with Giga feat. Meme Tokyo)	
12 November 2021	"KIKIKAIKAI" (with Giga feat. Yuzu)	
7 July 2022	"Defection" (feat. DELTA)	Arcaea collaboration
18 August 2022	"Let's End the World" (with Giga feat. Mori Calliope)	Hololive English collaboration
14 September 2022	"Desperate" (with Giga feat. LOLUET)	
10 November 2022	"Movie Star (#kzn & TeddyLoid Remix)" (with Steve Aoki feat. MOD SUN & Global Dan)	Remix for Hiroquest: Genesis
26 April 2023	"Blow My Gale (TeddyLoid Remix)" (feat. Lynn, Saori Onishi, Rika Kinugawa, Azusa Tadokoro, Naomi Ōzora, Yui Ogura, Ayami Fujino)	Umamusume: Pretty Derby collaboration
21 June 2023	"Tik(Q)et" (with Giga feat. Hatsune Miku, flower and KAFU)	
6 September 2023	"Show" (with Giga feat. Ado)	Halloween Horror Nights collaboration
25 November 2023	"Clutch" (with Giga feat. Irregular Dice)	
24 December 2023	"Matsuken Samba II × Ikuze! Kaitō Shōjo -TeddyLoid ULTRA MASHUP ver.-" (with Ken Matsudaira & Momoiro Clover Z)	
6 January 2024	"Knock It Out!" (with Giga feat. Amane Kanata)	Single from the 1st album Unknown DIVA
14 May 2024	"Let Me Battle" (with Giga feat. 9Lana)	Third ending theme for Pokémon Horizons: The Series
11 June 2024	"Play Back" (feat. Ren Zotto and Doppio Dropsythe)	Nijisanji EN collaboration
26 June 2024	"Go-Getters" (with Giga feat. Mori Calliope)	Ending theme of Suicide Squad Isekai
7 July 2024	"ULTRA C" (with Giga feat. Kagamine Rin & Len)	
8 August 2024	"Space Colony Ark: Act1 (TeddyLoid x Jun Senoue Remix)" (with Jun Senoue)	Remix for Shadow Generations
27 September 2024	"POW POW" (with Giga feat. ELSEE)	
11 October 2024	"Pikaaan!" (with Giga & Deco*27 feat. Rina Matsuda & Hikaru Morita of Sakurazaka46)	Fourth ending theme for Pokémon Horizons: The Series
15 November 2024	"Awake" (with Giga feat. Hoshimachi Suisei)	
27 December 2024	"flowers" (feat. Yuzu)	
26 March 2025	"Upboomboom" (with Giga feat. MYERA)	
23 April 2025	"Cupid" (feat. Amane Kanata)	Single from the 2nd album Trigger
27 April 2025	"Act" (with Giga feat. Daoko)	
21 May 2025	"Get Back" (feat. Yuzu)	Fifth opening theme for Pokémon Horizons: The Series
12 October 2025	"Bake no Kawa" (with Giga feat. Kobo Kanaeru and Kasane Teto as Maisondes)	Opening theme of Gnosia anime
18 March 2026	"Camouflage" (with Deco*27 feat. Ryota Takeuchi)	Single for MILGRAM Project
28 June 2026	"Violetta" (with Giga feat. Chogakusei)	
7 August 2026	"Monstruo" (with Giga feat. Ado)	
