= The Go-Getter =

The Go-Getter may refer to:

- "The Go-Getter" (short story), a 1931 short story by English-American author P. G. Wodehouse
- The Go-Getter (1923 film), American silent comedy film directed by Edward H. Griffith
- The Go Getter (1937 film), American film starring George Brent and Anita Louise
- The Go-Getter (1956 film), American film directed by Leigh Jason
- The Go-Getter (2007 film), an American independent road movie
- "The Go-Getter", a 1977 episode of the television series The Waltons
- The Go-Getter: a Story That Tells You How to Be One, a 1921 short novel (novella) by American author Peter B. Kyne
- "Go-Getters", a song by Mori Calliope
- "Go Getters", a 2016 television episode of The Walking Dead
- "The Go Getter", a track on the 2010 Black Keys album Brothers

== See also ==
- Getter Robo Go (also known as Gettā Robo Gō? or Getter Robot Go), a 50-episode Japanese mecha anime and manga series
- Go-Getters Out of the Gate, an anime television special based on video games
- "Go Getta", a 2007 song by Young Jeezy
