= Amelia Watson (streamer) =

Hololive English-speaking VTuber

Watson Amelia
- Watson Amelia as designed by Nabi
- Born: January 6
- Other names: Amelia Watson, Ame
- Occupation: VTuber

YouTube information
- Channel: Watson Amelia Ch. hololive-EN
- Years active: September 12, 2020 – September 30, 2024
- Genre: Let's play
- Subscribers: 1.75 million
- Views: 180,162,282
- Last updated: April 2026

Watson Amelia (Japanese: ワトソン・アメリア, Hepburn: Watoson Ameria), or more commonly Amelia Watson, is a VTuber affiliated with Hololive English. She is a member of Hololive English – Myth (stylized as HoloMyth), alongside Takanashi Kiara, Mori Calliope, Ninomae Ina'nis, and Gawr Gura. She debuted on September 13, 2020. Her livestreams focused on Let's Plays of games, including online first-person shooters, Elden Ring and Minecraft. On September 30, 2024, Watson stepped down from regular streaming activities, which was clarified to not be a graduation, continuing as an affiliate of Hololive. As of September 2024, she has amassed 1.78 million subscribers. Outside of YouTube, Watson had a presence on TikTok and Twitch.

== Overview ==
Amelia Watson's fictional lore describes her as a time-travelling detective. She shares her name with Dr. John Watson, Sherlock Holmes' confidant from the series of detective stories written by Arthur Conan Doyle. Her streams involve her sharing stories about her childhood, including incidents such as a head injury. Watson's personality has been described as "chaotic", "hectic", and "incoherent" compared to her co-members in HoloMyth.

== Career ==
Cover Corporation announced auditions for English speakers from April 23 to May 24, 2020, following the global success of its Japanese VTuber lineup.

On February 11, 2021, she reached 1 million subscribers on YouTube.

Watson hosted a 9-hour charity stream on June 6, 2021, for the benefit of Best Friends Animal Society, a U.S.-based welfare charity maintaining no-kill shelters for homeless pets. Donors helped reach the initial $50,000 goal in three minutes, before the beginning of the stream.

In October 2021, Hi-Rez Studios partnered with Hololive and release an announcer pack for the multiplayer first-person shooter game Paladins, featuring Amelia Watson's voice, in celebration of her reaching 1.5 million subscribers on YouTube.

On September 20, 2024, Watson announced her ceasing of regular streaming activities, in a stream entitled "A Short Talk", where she described the event as a conclusion of her general activities, "although technically not a graduation by name.” She later clarified that she will not be working as staff for Hololive Production, amidst speculation about her future status with the company. At the end of the month, her streaming activity within Hololive ended.

== Appearances outside YouTube ==
Amelia Watson appears as a playable character in 2022 roguelike shoot 'em up video game HoloCure – Save the Fans!.

== Discography ==
=== Singles ===
Release date	Title	Catalog no.
January 17, 2023	ChikuTaku	CVRD-254

=== Songs featured in ===
Release date	Title	Singers	Catalog no.
January 14, 2022	"Journey Like a Thousand Years"	Mori Calliope, Takanashi Kiara, Ninomae Ina'nis, Gawr Gura, Watson Amelia	CVRD-113
September 28, 2022	"Non-Fiction"	Mori Calliope, Takanashi Kiara, Ninomae Ina'nis, Gawr Gura, Watson Amelia	CVRD-220
June 17, 2023	"Connect the World"	Mori Calliope, Takanashi Kiara, Ninomae Ina'nis, Gawr Gura, Watson Amelia, IRyS, Ceres Fauna, Ouro Kronii, Nanashi Mumei, Hakos Baelz	CVRD-299
January 11, 2024	"ReUnion"	Mori Calliope, Takanashi Kiara, Ninomae Ina'nis, Gawr Gura, Watson Amelia	CVRD-385
August 15, 2024	"Breaking Dimensions"	Mori Calliope, Takanashi Kiara, Ninomae Ina'nis, Gawr Gura, Watson Amelia, IRyS, Ceres Fauna, Ouro Kronii, Nanashi Mumei, Hakos Baelz, Shiori Novella, Koseki Bijou, Nerissa Ravencroft, Fuwawa Abyssgard, Mococo Abyssgard	CVRD-448
September 15, 2024	"The Show Goes On!"	Mori Calliope, Takanashi Kiara, Ninomae Ina'nis, Gawr Gura, Watson Amelia	CVRD-471
October 24, 2024	"hololive English Eurobeat Remix Album"	Mori Calliope, Takanashi Kiara, Ninomae Ina'nis, Watson Amelia, IRyS, Ceres Fauna, Ouro Kronii, Nanashi Mumei, Hakos Baelz, Shiori Novella, Koseki Bijou, Nerissa Ravencroft, Fuwawa Abyssgard, Mococo Abyssgard, Elizabeth Rose Bloodflame, Gigi Murin, Cecillia Immergreen, Raora Panthera	CVRD-487
