= Houshou Marine =

Hololive Japanese VTuber

- 宝鐘マリン
- Houshou Marine as designed by Akasa Ai
- Born: 30 July
- Other name: Senchou
- Occupation: Virtual YouTuber

YouTube information
- Channel: Marine Ch. 宝鐘マリン
- Years active: 2019–present
- Genres: Livestreaming; Singing; Gaming
- Subscribers: 4.32 million
- Views: 2.190 billion
- Last updated: 17 March 2026
- Website: hololive.hololivepro.com/en/talents/houshou-marine/

Houshou Marine (宝鐘マリン, Hōshō Marin) (Japanese pronunciation: [ho̞ꜜːɕo̞ː maꜜɾiɴ]) is a Japanese virtual YouTuber affiliated with Hololive Production. She is part of Hololive Japan's 3rd Generation, "hololive Fantasy". On 10 January 2024, she reached 3.01 million subscribers on her YouTube channel, making her the most-subscribed VTuber from Japan on YouTube, surpassing Kizuna AI; on 5 May 2025, she reached 4 million subscribers, becoming the second to do so after Gawr Gura from Hololive English. She is the most-subscribed active VTuber on YouTube worldwide, and the second most-subscribed overall after Gura in most metrics.

== Career ==
Houshou Marine debuted on 11 August 2019 as the last member of hololive Fantasy to debut, after Usada Pekora, Uruha Rushia, Shirogane Noel, and Shiranui Flare. Her official character bio states that she calls herself the Captain ("Senchou") of the Houshou Pirates, but she doesn't actually own a ship (hoping her career will raise funds for one)—meaning she is only a cosplayer. Her Live2D avatar was designed by Akasa Ai and rigged by Ilie Tou.

Having her interest in VTubers piqued by Kaguya Luna, one of the early pioneers of VTubing, she started entertaining the thought of becoming a VTuber herself after becoming a fan of Nijisanji's Tsukino Mito. Marine cites Shirakami Fubuki and Minato Aqua as inspirations for her decision to audition for Hololive.

Marine's streams often includes chatting, drawing, singing, and playing video games. Her chatting streams are noted for her fast-paced delivery and diverse repertoire of topics, which ranges from TV shows she watched as a child, Internet culture, otaku knowledge about anime and manga from the 90s and 00s, Internet memes, and so on. Despite her official age being 17, she is often treated and joked about as a mature woman by viewers because of the dated topics she frequently talks about.

Noted for her skills as a digital artist, Marine sometimes draws on stream and posts her drawings on Twitter. She also actively discusses topics such as browsing adult-oriented doujinshi magazines and talks at length about searching for images of that manner in her streams.

In December 2023, Houshou Marine performed at the annual FNS Music Festival by Fuji TV, becoming the first VTuber to be invited onto the show. She was invited onto the show again the next year.

== Activity ==
=== Internet radio ===
- hololive presents V no Sukonna Otakatsu Nandawa (ホロライブpresents Vのすこんなオタ活なんだワ！) (6 May 2020 – 27 March 2024, HiBiKi Radio Station)
- Hologoe! (ホロごえっ！) (15 April 2024 – 16 April 2026, Abema)

=== Games ===
- World of Warships (2020)
- Neptunia Virtual Stars (2020)
- Touhou Spell Bubble (2020)
- Rakugaki Kingdom (2021)
- Caravan Stories (2021)
- Aquarium (2022)
- Yo-kai Watch: Wibble Wobble (2022)
- Valkyrie Connect (2023)
- Cubic Stars (2023)
- Truth of Beauty Witch -Marine's treasure ship- (2023)
- White Cat Project (2024)
- Rift of the NecroDancer (2025)

=== Film ===
- Ghostbusters: Frozen Empire (2024), Japanese dub
- Project Hail Mary (2026), Japanese dub

=== Live concerts ===
==== 2020 ====
- hololive 1st fes. Nonstop Story, 24 January, Toyosu Pit
- V×R GAME Nazotoki Valentine, 7 February – 1 March, Lazona Kawasaki Plaza
- Aeru! Hanaseru! VTuber Oshaberi Fes on Valentine, Hololive hen (会える！ 話せる！ VTuberおしゃべりフェス on バレンタイン ホロライブ編), 16 February 3331 Arts Chiyoda
- VTuber Fes Japan @ Niconico Net Chōkaigi 2020 (ニコニコネット超会議2020), 18–19 April, Niconico livestream）
- VARK Presents. hololive Virtual LIVE series in VARK "Cinderella switch: Futari de miru Hololive" vol.1, 27 September, VARK
- hololive 2nd fes. Beyond the Stage STAGE2, 21 December, paid online livestream

==== 2021 ====
- hololive IDOL PROJECT 1st Live. "Bloom,", 17 February, Tokyo Garden Theatre
- Kuro-Obi Virtual Idol Power 2021, 27 June, paid online livestream
- Hololive Fantasy 1st Live Fan Fun Island, 25 November, Tokyo Dome City Hall

==== 2022 ====
- Hololive 3rd fes. Link Your Wish (1st Day), 19 March, Makuhari Messe
- Minato Aqua One Man Live 2022: Aqua Iro in Wonderland (湊あくあ ワンマンライブ2022「あくあ色 in わんだ〜☆らんど♪」), 28 January, Toyosu Pit (Guest appearance)

==== 2023 ====
- Hololive 4th fes. Our Bright Parade (2nd Day), 19 March, Makuhari Messe
- Hololive English 1st Concert – Connect the World, 2 July, YouTube Theater (Guest appearance)
- 1st Usada PekoLive -USAGI the MEGAMI!!-, 6 December, Ariake Arena (Guest appearance)

==== 2024 ====
- Hololive 5th fes. Capture the Moment (1st Day), 16 March, Makuhari Messe
- hololive production x DreamHack Melbourne 2024: Down Under, 27 April, Rod Laver Arena (Guest appearance)
- hololive GAMERS fes. Cho-Cho-Cho-Cho GAMERS (hololive GAMERS fes. 超超超超ゲーマーズ), 25 May, Yoyogi National Gymnasium (Guest appearance)
- Houshou Marine 1st Live "Ahoy!! You're All Pirates ", 7–8 December, K-Arena Yokohama

==== 2025 ====
- Hololive 6th fes. Color Rise Harmony (2nd Day), 9 March, Makuhari Messe

==== 2026 ====
- hololive 3rd Generation Live: #OperationHeartfulCuties ~You’ve Got No Choice but to Love the Strongest Idols~, 17–18 January, K-Arena Yokohama

=== Books ===
- Houshou Marine Fanbook & Comic Anthology #TreasurePirate'sLog (宝鐘マリン ファンブック&コミックアンソロジー #お宝海賊日誌), published 2022, ISBN 9784049142075.
- Shirogane Noel & Houshou Marine 1st Photo Book: Double Date (白銀ノエル＆宝鐘マリン 1st PHOTO BOOK ふたりデート), published 2023, ISBN 978-4299034335.

== Discography ==
=== Albums ===
==== As lead artist ====
Title	Album details	Peak chart positions			Sales
Title	Album details	JPN	JPN Comb.	JPN Hot	Sales
Ahoy!! You're All Pirates♡ (Ahoy!! キミたちみんなパイレーツ♡)	Released: 16 October 2024; Label: cover corp.; Formats: CD, digital download, streaming	3	3	4	JPN: 21,633

==== As collaborative artist ====
Title	Details	Notes
#GENSOKYOholoism (#幻想郷ホロイズム)	Released: 10 July 2020; Label: Cool&Create	Touhou Project doujin music album

=== Extended plays ===
==== As lead artist ====
Title	EP details	Peak chart positions		Sales
Title	EP details	JPN	JPN Comb.	Sales
New World Carnival: Heading to the Enchanting Great Ocean (New World Carnival ～いざ魅惑の大海原へ♡～)	Released: 30 September 2026; Label: Universal Music Japan; Formats: CD, digital download, streaming	12	12	JPN: 6,386

==== As collaborative artist ====
Title	Details	Peak chart positions		Notes
Title	Details	JPN	JPN Comb.	Notes
Poppin Kiss (ぽっぴんキッス)	Released: 10 July 2020; Label: Giga	—	—	Cover song album for I've Sound 20th anniversary commemoration project. Marine is involved in 2 songs
#OperationHeartfulCuties ~You've Got No Choice but to Love the Strongest Idols~ (#きゅるるん大作戦 〜最強アイドル、推すしかないでしょ〜) (with Usada Pekora, Shiranui Flare, and Shirogane Noel as Hololive 3rd Generation )	Released: 17 January 2026; Label: hololive RECORDS	3	7	
Kami-Tsumo Dora Dora Densetsu (神ツモ☆ドラドラ伝説) (with Aki Rosenthal, Shirakami Fubuki, and Ichijou Ririka)	Released: 5 November 2026; Label: hololive RECORDS	—	—	Written for Hololive Mahjong: Holojan

=== Singles ===
==== As lead artist ====
Title	Year	Peak chart positions		Album	Notes
Title	Year	JPN DS	JPN DL	Album	Notes
"Ahoy!! We are Houshou Pirates" (Ahoy!! 我ら宝鐘海賊団☆)	2020	—	53	Ahoy!! You’re All Pirates♡	Composed by ARM of IOSYS
"Unison"	2021	43	43	Ahoy!! You’re All Pirates♡	
"Marine Set Sail!!" (マリン出航!!)	2022	19	16	Ahoy!! You’re All Pirates♡	Composed by Kohei Tanaka
"I’m Your Treasure Box * You have found captain Marine in a treasure chest" (I'm Your Treasure Box ＊あなたは マリンせんちょうを たからばこからみつけた。)	2022	36	17	Ahoy!! You’re All Pirates♡	Composed by Camellia
"Bishoujyo Muzai♡Pirates" (美少女無罪♡パイレーツ)	2023	17	15	Ahoy!! You’re All Pirates♡	
"Roman Hikō" (浪漫飛行)	2023	—	—	Roman Hikō Tribute Album	Part of the tribute album for Kome Kome Club's song "Roman Hikō"
"Dead Ma'am's Chest" (幽霊船戦)	2024	12	12	Ahoy!! You’re All Pirates♡	Composed by Toby Fox
"How about Paipai Mask?" (パイパイ仮面でどうかしらん？)	2024	40	44	Ahoy!! You’re All Pirates♡	
"BooooM!!!"	2026	—	93	New World Carnival ～Heading to the Enchanting Great Ocean♡～	Second ending theme of the Magilumiere Co. Ltd. anime
"Kyapi" (きゃぴ)	2026	—	59	TBA	
"—" denotes releases that did not chart or were not released in that region.

==== As collaborative artist ====
Title	Year	Peak chart positions		Album	Notes
Title	Year	JPN DS	JPN DL	Album	Notes
"Gimme Ginmi virtual Saiko star!!!!" (Gimme吟味virtuaる最高star！！！！) (with Sakura Miko, Shirakami Fubuki, and Natsuiro Matsuri)	2021	—	—	Non-album single	Theme song for the 2nd anniversary of the Nintendo Switch version of Groove Coaster: Wai Wai Party!!!!. Released under the sasakuration label
"Domination! All the World Is an Ocean" (浸食!! 地球全域全おーしゃん) (with Minato Aqua, Ninomae Ina'nis, and Gawr Gura as UMISEA)	2021	—	—	Non-album single	
"Interact Fantasia" (いんたらくとふぁんたじあ) (with Usada Pekora, Uruha Rushia, Shiranui Flare, and Shirogane Noel as hololive Fantasy)	2021	—	—	Non-album single	
"Happiness World" (with Shirakami Fubuki as BABACORN)	2022	—	49	Ahoy!! You're All Pirates♡	
"It Comes Ryuuu And It Goes Kyuuu" (りゅーーっときてきゅーーっ!!!) (with Minato Aqua, Sakamata Chloe, Ninomae Ina'nis, and Gawr Gura as UMISEA)	2022	—	—	Non-album single	
"UMISEA no SACHIHAPPY!" (うみシーのさちハピ！) (with Minato Aqua, Sakamata Chloe, Ninomae Ina'nis, and Gawr Gura as UMISEA)	2023	—	—	Non-album single	
"Ocean wave Party☆Live" (おーしゃんうぇーぶ・Party☆らぃ) (with Minato Aqua, Sakamata Chloe, Ninomae Ina'nis, and Gawr Gura as UMISEA)	2023	—	—	Non-album single	
"SHINKIRO" (with Gawr Gura as GuraMarine)	2023	21	23	Ahoy!! You're All Pirates♡	
"BridalDream" (ブライダルドリーム) (with Usada Pekora)	2023	—	63	Holohoneygaoka High School -Originals-	Hololive collaboration with HoneyWorks
"pipapo☆pipipu" (ピパポ☆ピピプ) (with Shirakami Fubuki as BABACORN)	2024	—	—	Ahoy!! You're All Pirates♡	
"I wanna be junkie" (愛 罠 be ジャンキー) (original by Dyes Iwasaki)	2024	—	—	D.I. SWING	
"Reality Fantasy" (with Usada Pekora, Shiranui Flare, and Shirogane Noel as hololive Fantasy)	2024	—	—	#OperationHeartfulCuties ~You’ve Got No Choice but to Love the Strongest Idols~	
"III" (with Kobo Kanaeru)	2024	—	65	Ahoy!! You're All Pirates♡	
"HajimarinoMahou-charm-" (はじまりの魔法-charm-) (with Amane Kanata, Sakura Miko, Himemori Luna, Murasaki Shion, and Sakamata Chloe as Magical Girl holoWitches!)	2024	—	90	Non-album single	
"On your side" (with Amane Kanata, Sakura Miko, Himemori Luna, Shirakami Fubuki, and Yukihana Lamy as Magical Girl holoWitches!)	2024	—	—	Non-album single	
"faint sunset" (微かな夕陽) (with Amane Kanata, Sakura Miko, Himemori Luna, Shirakami Fubuki, and Yukihana Lamy as Magical Girl holoWitches!)	2025	—	—	Non-album single	
"Yokubari Denno Girl" (よくばり電脳ガール) (with Usada Pekora, Shiranui Flare, and Shirogane Noel as hololive 3rd Generation)	2025	—	—	#OperationHeartfulCuties ~You’ve Got No Choice but to Love the Strongest Idols~	
"Necchu Syndrome" (ねっちゅーシンドローム) (with Amane Kanata, Sakura Miko, Himemori Luna, Shirakami Fubuki, and Yukihana Lamy as Magical Girl holoWitches!)	2025	—	—	Non-album single	
"kyuru☆cheer" (きゅる☆ちあ) (with Usada Pekora, Shiranui Flare, and Shirogane Noel as hololive 3rd Generation)	2025	—	—	#OperationHeartfulCuties ~You’ve Got No Choice but to Love the Strongest Idols~	
"Ai Ai Ai Ai♡Ai Love You" (あいあいあいあい♡あいらぶゆー) (with Usada Pekora, Shiranui Flare, and Shirogane Noel as hololive 3rd Generation)	2026	—	—	#OperationHeartfulCuties ~You’ve Got No Choice but to Love the Strongest Idols~	
"Chatter Chatter" (with Hoshimachi Suisei)	2026	35	37	TBA	

== Awards and nominations ==
Year	Ceremony	Category	Result	Ref.
2023	The Vtuber Awards	League of Their Own	Nominated	
2024	The Vtuber Awards	League of Their Own	Nominated	
