= Go-Getters =

Single by Mori Calliope

from the album Phantomime
- Language: English; Japanese
- Released: June 27, 2024
- Genre: J-pop; hip hop
- Length: 3:16
- Label: EMI
- Composers: Giga; TeddyLoid
- Lyricists: Mori Calliope; Yuki Tsujimura

Mori Calliope singles chronology
"Midnight Mayoi" (2024)	"Go-Getters" (2024)	"Flash Bang" (2024)

Alternative cover
- Yoon remix cover

Music video
- "Go-Getters" on YouTube

"Go-Getters" is a song by virtual YouTuber Mori Calliope. It was released on June 27, 2024 by EMI Records as the fourth and final single from her third studio album, Phantomime (2024). The song was featured as the ending theme song for the anime television series Suicide Squad Isekai.

== Background and release ==
On March 14, 2024, Warner Bros.'s Japanese wing released the third trailer for the anime series, Suicide Squad Isekai, revealing that Mori Calliope would be singing the ending theme, titled "Go-Getters". "Go-Getters" was released as a digital single on June 27, 2024. An accompanying credit-less ending video for Suicide Squad Isekai was also released that same day in advance of the series premiere.

A remix featuring Yoon of the South Korean girl group STAYC was released on July 27, 2024 and was included as a bonus track on the regular version of Phantomime, released on August 16. A second remix featuring Thai co-ed duo Luss was released on August 2. A third remix featuring Ren and Ryushin of the Japanese boy band Psychic Fever from Exile Tribe was released on October 18, 2024.

An accompanying music video was released on September 6, 2024 at 12:00 p.m. JST. It was directed and edited by Takashi Horiuchi and animated by Wit Studio.

== Commercial performance ==
"Go-Getters" debuted at number 41 on the Oricon Digital Singles Chart for the chart issue date of July 8, 2024, selling 1,271 digital copies, making it her first appearance on that chart. The song also appeared at number 43 on the Billboard Japan Download Songs chart for the chart issue date of July 3, 2024.

== Credits and personnel ==
Credits adapted from Apple Music.

- Mori Calliope – performer, lyricist
- Yuki Tsujimura – lyricist
- Giga – composer
- TeddyLoid – composer

== Charts ==
Weekly chart performance for "Go-Getters"
Chart (2024)	Peak position
Japan Digital Singles (Oricon)	41
Japan Download Songs (Billboard Japan)	43

== Release history ==
Release history and formats for "Go-Getters"
Region	Date	Format	Version	Label	Ref.
Various	June 27, 2024	Digital download; streaming	Original	EMI	
Various	July 27, 2024	Digital download; streaming	Yoon remix	EMI	
Various	August 2, 2024	Digital download; streaming	Luss remix	EMI	
Various	October 18, 2024	Digital download; streaming	Ren & Ryushin remix	EMI	
