= Meme Tokyo =

Japanese idol girl group

- Origin: Japan
- Genres: J-pop
- Years active: 2019–present
- Labels: Dear Stage; Toy's Factory
- Members: MEW; SOLI; SAE; MINORI
- Past members: PERO; ASUKA; KOROMO; RITO; MITSUKI; NENE

Meme Tokyo (ミームトーキョー) is a Japanese girl group formed by Dear Stage in 2019. They debuted with the single, "Melancholic Circus", on December 25, 2019. As of 2026, the group consists of Mew, Soli, Sae, and Minori.

== History ==
On July 31, 2019, Meme Tokyo was introduced as Dempagumi.inc's junior group. The debut line-up consisted of Asuka, Koromo, Rito, Soli, and Mew who is a former member of the second generation of Bis. On October 5, 2019, Soli went on hiatus to focus on her education and Dempagumi.inc's Rin Kaname joined the group as a support member under the name Pero. The group released their debut single, "Melancholic Circus", on December 25.

On March 18, 2020, their second single, "Retro Future", was released. On June 2, Soli resumed activities and Pero's support period ended. On July 29, the group released their third single, "Moratorium Aquarium". On December 14, Asuka withdrew from the group.

On January 29, 2021, new member Sae joined the group. On February 16, Rito became a concurrent member of Dempagumi.inc. On April 5, Koromo went on hiatus due to health problems. The group released their fourth single, "Antisuggest", on April 21. On June 12, Koromo graduated from the group. On July 16, new members Mitsuki and Nene joined the group. They released their fifth single, "The Struggle is Real", as their major label debut through Toy's Factory on August 25, 2021.

On April 13, 2022, the group's sixth single, Animore, was released.

On February 8, 2023, Meme Tokyo's debut album, Meme Tokyo., was released. Their first EP, Memetic Infection, was released on June 7.

Their second EP, Memetic World, was released on June 26, 2024.

On September 26, 2025, Rito graduated from the group at a graduation concert titled "meme；idea".

On June 30, 2026, Mitsuki and Nene graduated from the group at a joint graduation concert titled "Memetic Eclipse". On July 1, 2026, new member Minori, selected through an audition for new members, joined the group, bringing the line-up to four members: Mew, Soli, Sae, and Minori.

== Members ==
=== Current ===
- Mew
- Soli
- Sae (since 2021)
- Minori (since 2026)

=== Former ===
- Pero (2019-2020, support member)
- Asuka (2019-2020)
- Koromo (2019-2021)
- Rito (2019–2025)
- Mitsuki (2021–2026)
- Nene (2021–2026)

== Discography ==
=== Studio albums ===
| Title | Album details | Peak chart positions | |
| Title | Album details | Oricon | Billboard |
|---|---|---|---|
| Meme Tokyo. | Released: February 8, 2023; Label: Toy's Factory; Formats: CD, digital download | 31 | 58 |

=== Extended plays ===
| Title | Album details | Peak chart positions | |
| Title | Album details | Oricon | Billboard |
|---|---|---|---|
| Memetic Infection | Released: June 7, 2023; Label: Toy's Factory; Formats: CD, digital download | 40 | 67 |
| Memetic World | Released: June 26, 2024; Label: Toy's Factory; Formats: CD, digital download | — | 88 |

=== Singles ===
==== As lead artist ====
| Title | Year | Peak chart positions | Album |
| Title | Year | Oricon | Album |
|---|---|---|---|
| "Melancholic Circus" (メランコリックサーカス) | 2019 | — | Meme Tokyo. |
| "Retro Future" (レトロフューチャー) | 2020 | — | Meme Tokyo. |
| "Moratorium Aquarium" (モラトリアムアクアリウム) | 2020 | — | Meme Tokyo. |
| "Anti Suggest" (アンチサジェスト) | 2021 | 46 | Meme Tokyo. |
| "The Struggle is Real" | 2021 | 31 | Meme Tokyo. |
| "Animore" (アニモア) | 2022 | 17 | Meme Tokyo. |
"—" denotes releases that did not chart or were not released in that region.
