= Gawr Gura =

Hololive English-speaking VTuber (2020–2025)

- Gawr Gura as designed by Amashiro Natsuki
- Born: June 20
- Occupation: Virtual YouTuber

YouTube information
- Channel: Gawr Gura Ch. hololive-EN
- Years active: September 13, 2020 – May 1, 2025
- Genres: Livestreaming; singing; gaming
- Subscribers: 4.74 million
- Views: 445 million
- Last updated: May 5, 2025
- Website: hololive.hololivepro.com/en/talents/gawr-gura/

Gawr Gura (がうる・ぐら, Gauru Gura) is a retired virtual YouTuber who was affiliated with Hololive English. She debuted on September 13, 2020, and has since become the most subscribed virtual YouTuber, amassing over 4 million subscribers. She is a member of Hololive English – Myth (stylized as HoloMyth), the first generation of English language performers for Hololive, alongside Takanashi Kiara, Mori Calliope, Ninomae Ina'nis, and Amelia Watson. Her livestreams focused on entertainment, and primarily consisted of Let's Plays, karaoke, and chats with the audience. Gura is often called "Same-chan" in Japan, same (サメ) meaning shark. On April 15, 2025, she announced that she would graduate from Hololive; her final stream, a short 3D concert, was held on May 1, 2025.

== Career ==
Cover Corporation announced auditions for English speakers from April 23 to May 24, 2020, following the global success of its Japanese VTuber lineup. The design of Gawr Gura was illustrated by Amashiro Natsuki, and the original modeling was done by Shin Umiushi.

Gura's Twitter activities first began on September 9, 2020. Her first YouTube livestream was broadcast at 6 a.m. JST on September 13, to a viewership of approximately 45,000 people; the VOD gained over 800,000 views in the span of three days. On November 28, "Gawr Gura" was listed in the Niconico Japanese Internet Pop 100 as one of the top 100 most popular search terms of that year on Niconico and Pixiv, ranking 99th.

Her channel reached 1 million subscribers on October 22, 2020, which was the fastest growth of any VTuber channel. She is the third VTuber overall to reach 1 million, behind Kizuna AI and Kaguya Luna. On January 18, her channel subscribers surpassed 2 million, making her the second VTuber to reach this milestone, second only to Kizuna AI, and she celebrated with a karaoke stream on January 23. On May 7, her first outfit reveal stream reached a peak of 194,280 simultaneous viewers, breaking the VTuber record previously held by Sakura Miko (about 145,000). Her first original song, "REFLECT", was released on June 21, 2021. On June 30, 5:01 a.m. (UTC+0), she reached 2.97 million subscribers, surpassing Kizuna AI as the most subscribed VTuber on YouTube. On July 4, she became the first VTuber to reach 3 million subscribers, and subsequently 4 million subscribers on June 16, 2022.

On July 3, 2021, it was announced that a Gawr Gura Nendoroid figure would be produced, and on August 6, pre-orders for the figure were opened. On March 18, 2022, following her 3D debut live performance at Makuhari Messe, it was announced that the life-sized figure and 1/7-scale figure of Gura, which were both displayed at the expo, would be auctioned for charity.

On April 25, 2022, Cover Corporation announced the Hololive Meet project, featuring all the talent from across Hololive Production and aims to accelerate the expansion of Hololive Production into international markets and named Gawr Gura, Tokino Sora and Ayunda Risu as ambassadors for the project. The three appeared at Anime Expo the same year.

On December 2, 2022, Cover Corporation announced a collaboration with musician Deco*27, named "Holo*27", featuring Hololive talents to perform at the Holo*27 stage at the Hololive 4th Fest. Our Bright Parade on March 19, 2023, named Gura as one of the participating members.

A Hololive Production ad featuring Gura, March 2023

On February 8, 2023, the Tokyo Metropolitan Government appointed Gura, fellow Hololive Myth member Mori Calliope, and Hololive Japan member Sakura Miko as Tokyo Tourism Ambassadors with the aim of "increasing the number of visitors and revitalizing the region" for potential visitors. Hololive Production noted that the three will "share the attractions of Tokyo to the world".

On March 13, 2023, in the lead up to Hololive 4th Fes. Our Bright Parade, Cover Corporation introduced a new series of billboards across 9 Tokyo Metro train lines, featuring all Hololive members, debuting a new slogan "A new daily life is around the corner". On March 18, following Day 1 of 4th Fes. Hololive announced that all ten members of Hololive English will hold their first concert, "Connect the World", on July 2, to be held at the YouTube Theater in Los Angeles, California. At Connect the World, Gura introduced a new song "Full Color", which was slated to be released at a later date, though was ultimately scrapped.

On July 1, 2023, Cover Corporation announced their annual "Hololive Summer" Event, featuring a two-day "Splash Party!" concert, a Summer Shorts relay on YouTube and the release of "Seishun Archive" as the event's theme song.

On November 27, 2023, the City of Sendai and Cover Corporation announced a collaboration featuring Gura at the Sendai Umino-Mori Aquarium. Dubbed "Gurarium in Sendai Umino-Mori Aquarium" and beginning in January 2024, Sendai and Gura will promote the city and the surrounding regions featuring original artwork and narration at the aquarium.

On June 1, 2024, Cover Corporation announced a collaboration with the Major League Baseball team Los Angeles Dodgers for a special "Hololive Night" event scheduled for July 5, 2024, which includes commemorative trading cards featuring Gura, and Hololive Japan members Hoshimachi Suisei and Usada Pekora. The talent announced the opening introduction "Time for Dodger Baseball", and Gura sang the traditional song Take Me Out to the Ballgame during the seventh inning of the game featuring the Dodgers and Milwaukee Brewers. Later in the month, on June 8, Cover announced "Breaking Dimensions" Hololive English's 2nd Concert, which was held on August 24 and 25, 2024, at the Kings Theatre in Brooklyn, New York, where 15 members of Hololive English performed.

Gawr Gura 🔱
(@gawrgura)
tweeted:

keep swimming! always! 💙

May 1, 2025

On April 15, 2025, Gura announced her graduation from Hololive effective May 1, using terminology from the Japanese idol industry to refer to retirement, as is common among VTubers. Her final activity on that date consisted of multiple streams with her fellow Hololive Myth members playing games such as Minecraft, The Jackbox Party Pack, Gang Beasts, and Uno, concluding in a short 3D "mini live" concert, during which she performed a medley of her officially released original songs, followed by a short animation.

== Popularity ==
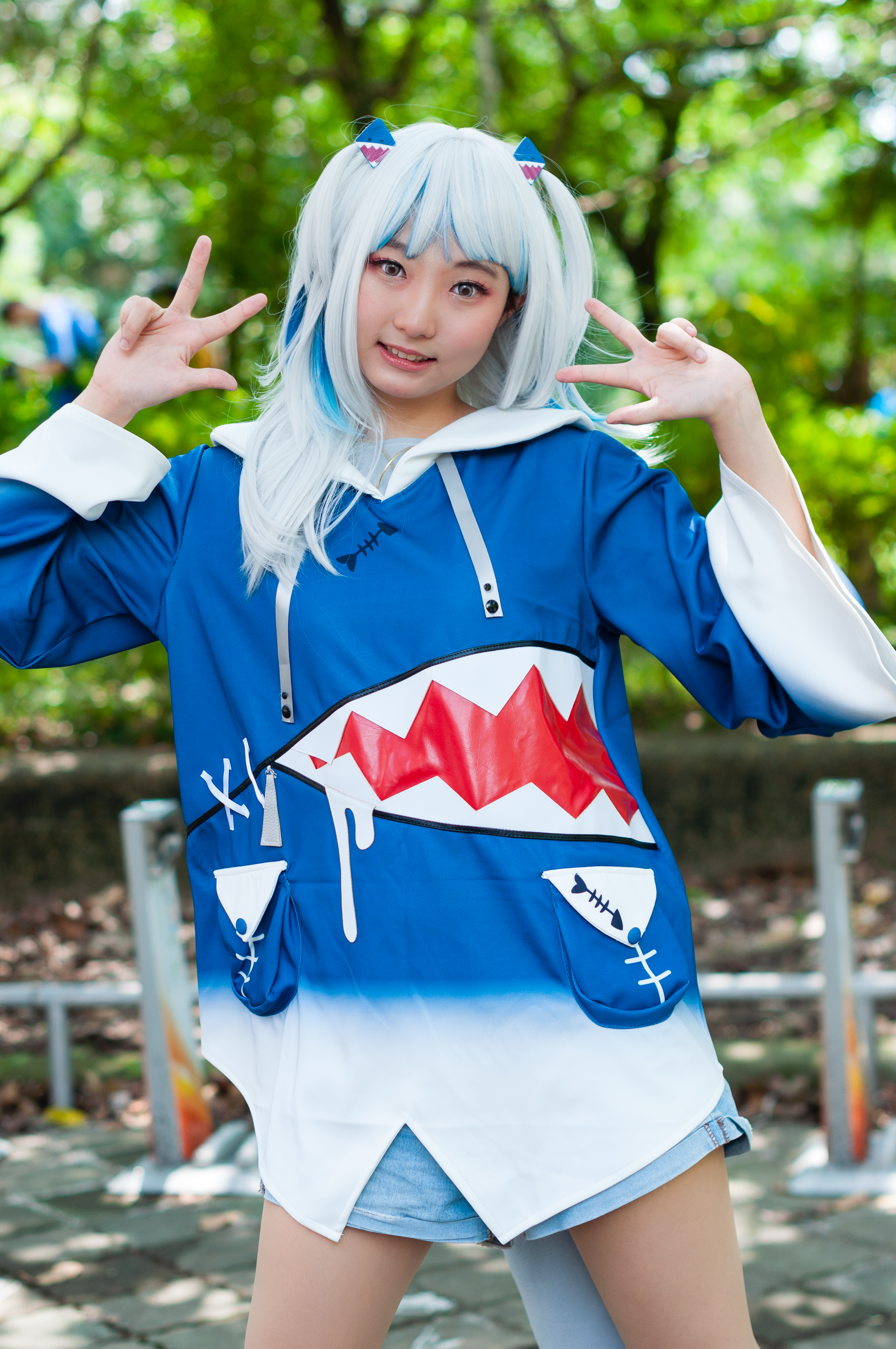
Gawr Gura cosplay at Comic World

On September 9, 2020, Gura posted her first tweet with the word "a". On September 13, her first live broadcast was delayed and her first word was "a" ([æ]). Later, the broadcast was interrupted due to equipment problems, leaving tens of thousands of users typing "a" in the chat room, waiting for the broadcast to resume. "a" quickly became an internet meme. This, combined with the overall popular surge of VTubers (and virtual reality in general) as a result of the COVID-19 pandemic, likely contributed to Gura's fast success. Only forty days after her debut, she had reached one million subscribers, becoming the first Hololive VTuber to do so.

== Appearances outside YouTube ==
=== TV programs ===
- Cameo appearance in a Taco Bell commercial that aired on July 23, 2021, as part of a sponsorship for their Nacho Fries product. According to creative director Daniel Chen, Taco Bell is the first American company to feature a VTuber.

=== Sports ===
- Gura sung "Take Me Out to the Ball Game" at the Milwaukee Brewers–Los Angeles Dodgers game on July 5, 2024, at Dodger Stadium in Los Angeles, California.

=== Video games ===
- Groove Coaster: Wai Wai Party!!!! – Playable character and in-game narrator, added to the game in an update on December 16, 2021.
- HoloCure – Save the Fans! – Playable character, launched when the game debuted on June 23, 2022.
- Earth Defense Force 6 - Support character (decoy) in her respective DLC as a Pre-Order bonus for non-Asian countries on July 25, 2024.
- Rift of the NecroDancer - Gura's song "REFLECT" - featuring Gura herself as a character portrait - was added as a free DLC, alongside other Hololive songs.

=== Live events ===
- Anime Expo Lite 2021 (July 3–4, 2021)
- Fan Expo Dallas (Dallas, Texas, at the Kay Bailey Hutchison Convention Center, September 17–19, 2021)
- Fan Expo Canada (Toronto, Ontario, at the Metro Toronto Convention Centre, October 22–24, 2021)
- Guest appearance at One-Man Live 2022 "Aqua Iro in Wonder☆Land♪" at Toyosu Pit, January 28, 2022
- Hololive 3rd Fest. Link Your Wish at Makuhari Messe Event Hall, March 19–20, 2022
- Anime Central (Rosemont, Illinois, at the Donald E. Stephens Convention Center, May 20–22, 2022)
- Guest appearance at Mori Calliope Major Debut Concert 2022 "New Underworld Order" at Toyosu Pit, July 21, 2022
- Crunchyroll Expo (San Jose, California, at the San Jose Convention Center, August 5–7, 2022)
- Guest appearance at YouTube Fanfest 10 (Singapore, at the Marina Bay Sands, November 11, 2022)
- Anime Festival Asia 2022 (Singapore, at the Suntec Singapore Convention and Exhibition Centre, November 25–27, 2022)
- Hololive 4th Fest. Our Bright Parade at Makuhari Messe Event Hall, March 18–19, 2023
- "Connect the World" Hololive English 1st Concert (Los Angeles, California at the YouTube Theater, July 2, 2023)
- Hololive Summer 2023 Live Splash Party! (August 26–27, 2023)
- AnimeNYC Expo 2023 (New York, New York, at the Jacob Javits Center, November 17–19, 2023)
- Hololive 5th Fest. Capture The Moment at Makuhari Messe Event Hall, March 16–17, 2024
- Hololive Meet SUPER KARAOKE PARTY @ TAIPEI 2024 (Taipei, Taiwan, at the Taipei Music Center, May 11, 2024)
- Japan Expo 2024 (Paris, France, at the Paris-Nord Villepinte Exhibition Center, July 11–14, 2024)
- "Breaking Dimensions" Hololive English 2nd Concert (Brooklyn, New York at the Kings Theatre, August 24–25, 2024)
- Hololive 6th Fest. Color Rise Harmony at Makuhari Messe Event Hall, March 8–9, 2025

== Discography ==
=== Singles ===
==== As lead artist ====
Title	Year	Peak chart positions			Catalog no.	Album
Title	Year	JPN Dig.	JPN DL	US World	Catalog no.	Album
"Reflect"	2021	—	70	—	CVRD-048	Non-album single
"Q" (with Mori Calliope)	2022	—	70	7	CVRD-126	UnAlive
"Sweet Appetite" (with Hakos Baelz)	2023	—	—	—	TFDS-00889	Holo*27 Originals Vol. 1
"Shinkiro" (with Houshou Marine as GuraMarine)	2023	21	23	—	CVRD-351	Ahoy!! You're All Pirates♡
"Tokyo Wabi-Sabi Lullaby"	2024	—	—	—	CVRD-360	Holohoneygaoka High School -Originals-
"Ash Again"	2025	—	—	—	CVRD-566	Non-album single
"—" denotes releases that did not chart.

==== As collaborative artist ====
Title	Year	Peak chart positions	Catalog no.	Album
Title	Year	JPN DL	Catalog no.	Album
"Domination! All the World Is an Ocean" (as Umisea)	2021	59	CVRD-077	Non-album singles
"Journey Like a Thousand Years" (as Hololive English -Myth-)	2022	—	CVRD-113	Non-album singles
"It Comes Ryuuu And It goes Kyuuu" (as Umisea)	2022	47	CVRD-205	Non-album singles
"Non-Fiction" (as Hololive English -Myth-)	2022	—	CVRD-220	Non-album singles
"UMISEA no SACHIHAPPY!" (as Umisea)	2023	—	CVRD-286	Non-album singles
"Connect the World" (as Hololive English)	2023	—	CVRD-299	Non-album singles
"Ocean wave Party☆Live" (as Umisea)	2023	85	CVRD-318	Non-album singles
"ReUnion" (as Hololive English -Myth-)	2024	—	CVRD-385	Non-album singles
"Give up! I want to be reincarnated" (original by Dyes Iwasaki)	2024	—		D.I. SWING
"Breaking Dimensions" (as Hololive English)	2024	—	CVRD-448	Non-album singles
"The Show Goes On!" (as Hololive English -Myth-)	2024	—	CVRD-471	Non-album singles
"Odyssey" (as Hololive English)	2024	—	CVRD-514	Non-album singles
"—" denotes releases that did not chart.

== Awards and nominations ==
Year	Award	Category	Result	Ref.
2023	Streamy Awards	VTuber	Won	
2023	The Vtuber Awards	Most Dedicated Fanbase (Chumbuds)	Won	
