= Mori Calliope =

Hololive English-speaking VTuber and singer

- The avatar of Mori Calliope, designed by Yukisame
- Born: United States
- Occupation: Virtual YouTuber

YouTube information
- Channel: Mori Calliope Ch. hololive-EN
- Years active: 2020–present
- Subscribers: 2.66 million
- Views: 956 million
- Last updated: 20 October 2026
- Website: hololive.hololivepro.com/en/talents/mori-calliope/

Mori Calliope (Japanese: 森カリオペ, Hepburn: Mori Kariope) (Note: She was originally named 森美声 in Japanese, which has the same pronunciation, before being officially renamed on 1 September 2021.) is an American virtual YouTuber and singer affiliated with Cover Corporation's Hololive Production agency, who debuted in September 2020 as a member of the Hololive English Myth unit.

== Overview ==
Mori Calliope's fictional lore describes her as the "Grim Reaper's first apprentice" who, due to slow business, had to start a career as a VTuber and collect souls. Her character is reminiscent of the shinigami.

Mori is one of the five members of the agency's subgroup Hololive English: Myth, alongside Gawr Gura, Ninomae Ina'nis, Takanashi Kiara, and Amelia Watson. Her character designer is Yukisame. She is American.

== Career ==
Mori Calliope made her debut along with the other members of Hololive English Myth on 12 September 2020. Her debut EP, Dead Beats, was released on 17 October 2020 and charted at #23 at the Oricon Digital Albums Chart. She released her first single "Cursed Night" on 2 November 2020. This was followed on 4 April 2021 with another EP, Your Mori.; it charted at #35 at the Oricon Albums Chart.

In April 2022, Mori announced that she had signed with EMI Records, and that she would mark her major-label debut with her third EP, Shinigami Note. Released on 20 July 2022, Shinigami Note charted at #9 at the Oricon Albums Chart. On 21 July 2022, Mori's first solo concert, New Underworld Order, was held at Toyosu Pit in Tokyo. A Blu-ray of the concert was released on 3 May 2023. On 11 October 2022, it was announced that she would release her debut album Sinderella on 16 December; the album's themes include the seven deadly sins and personal guilt. It charted at #28 at the Oricon Albums Chart. In July 2023, she released "Future Island", a song commemorating Volume 106 of One Piece. On 18 August 2023, she released another EP, Jigoku 6; it charted at #16 on the Oricon Albums Chart. In December 2023, she won Best Music Vtuber at the 2023 Vtuber Awards.

In March 2024, Mori and Warner Bros. Entertainment announced that she would be singing the ending theme for the anime Suicide Squad Isekai, titled "Go-Getters". In May 2024, it was announced that she would release her second major-label album, Phantomime, on 16 August. In October 2025, Mori announced that she would perform the second opening theme in Gachiakuta, titled "Let's Just Crash". In November 2025, it was announced that Mori would release her third major-label album, Disasterpiece, on 6 February 2026.

In addition to music, Mori does video game livestreams on her channel. In a December 2020 livestream, she spent at least 90 minutes asking video game developer Atlus to allow her to stream one of their games, Persona 3, (Note: There is no fair use doctrine in Japanese copyright law, so VTubers often request permission from developers to livestream their games.) which Petrit Baillet of Dot Esports described as "a famous part of her ongoing streaming career". In June 2022, she expressed regret, admitting she hadn't realized how big Hololive had become at the time of the stream. In January 2023, she livestreamed Persona 3 on her YouTube channel for the first time.

In September 2021, she appeared at Calgary Expo and Fan Expo Dallas as part of Hololive English's North American tour. She has also appeared at Anime Festival Asia as a musical guest twice: in 2022 and 2023. In November 2023, she appeared at Anime NYC 2023 as a guest. In December 2023, she appeared at Anime Frontier 2023 as a guest.

== Artistry ==
Katie Gill of Anime Feminist described her profanity-laden rap music as an exception to the widespread use of Japanese idol themes within Hololive. Teddy Cambosa of Anime Corner said that her "style of rapping comes in line with the rise of other large VTubers that are now leaning towards a more Western preference instead of the Japanese idol grassroots".

In an August 2022 Crunchyroll News interview, when asked which music was the most influential to her, Mori explained that her interest in rapping was first sparked by Japanese hip hop, citing the genre's unique style and intensity. She also cites the electro-swing duo Fake Type as her inspiration for her rapping career.

== Discography ==
=== Studio albums ===
Title	Album details	Peak chart positions							Sales
Title	Album details	JPN	JPN Comb.	JPN Hot	UK Down.	US Heat.	US Sales	US World	Sales
UnAlive	Released: 21 March 2022; Label: Cover Corp; Formats: Digital download, LP, streaming	— (Note: UnAlive did not enter the Oricon Albums Chart but peaked at number 5 on the Oricon Digital Albums Chart.)	—	34	45	—	—	—	JPN: 1,156
Sinderella	Released: 16 December 2022; Label: EMI; Formats: CD, digital download, LP, streaming	28	34	17	80	11	— (Note: Sinderella did not enter the Top Albums Sales chart but peaked at number 61 on the Top Current Albums Sales chart.)	—	JPN: 3,547
Phantomime	Released: 16 August 2024; Label: EMI; Formats: CD, digital download, streaming	12	18	13	—	5	9	4	JPN: 4,283
Disasterpiece	Released: 6 February 2026; Label: EMI; Formats: CD, digital download, streaming	17	34	— (Note: Disasterpiece did not enter the Billboard Japan Hot Albums chart but peaked at number 12 on the Download Albums chart.)	—	—	24	7	JPN: 3,339
"—" denotes releases that did not chart or were not released in that region.

=== Extended plays ===
Title	EP details	Peak chart positions							Sales
Title	EP details	JPN	JPN Comb.	JPN Hot	UK Down.	US Heat.	US Sales	US World	Sales
Dead Beats	Released: 17 October 2020; Label: Cover Corp; Formats: Digital download, streaming	— (Note: Dead Beats did not enter the Oricon Albums Chart but peaked at number 3 on the Oricon Digital Albums Chart.)	44	—	—	—	— (Note: Dead Beats did not enter the Top Albums Sales chart but peaked at number 87 on the Top Current Albums Sales chart.)	—	JPN: 2,847
Your Mori.	Released: 4 April 2021; Label: Cover Corp; Formats: CD, digital download, LP, streaming	35	42	12	—	—	— (Note: Your Mori. did not enter the Top Albums Sales chart but peaked at number 83 on the Top Current Albums Sales chart.)	—	JPN: 3,942
Shinigami Note	Released: 20 July 2022; Label: EMI; Formats: CD, digital download, LP, streaming	9	11	5	78	—	—	—	JPN: 8,731
Jigoku 6	Released: 18 August 2023; Label: EMI; Formats: CD, digital download, LP, streaming	16	24	8	—	6	25	8	JPN: 3,682
"—" denotes releases that did not chart or were not released in that region.

=== Mixtapes ===
Title	Album details
My Mixtape (as Yung Sh1n1gam1 Bo1)	Released: 1 April 2022; Label: Self-released; Format: Streaming

=== Singles ===
==== As lead artist ====
Title	Year	Peak chart positions			Sales	Album
Title	Year	JPN Dig.	JPN DL	US World	Sales	Album
"Cursed Night"	2020	—	—	—		Non-album singles
"Off with Their Heads"	2021	—	—	—		Non-album singles
"Ibasho (Where I Belong)" (居場所)	2021	—	—	—		Non-album singles
"End of a Life" (Note: While initially released as a stand-alone single, a remix of "End of a Life" was included as a bonus track on standard physical versions of Sinderella.)	2021	—	84	—		Non-album singles
"Graveyard Shift" (featuring Boogey Voxx)	2021	—	—	—		UnAlive
"Q" (with Gawr Gura)	2021	—	70	7		UnAlive
"Dawn Blue"	2021	—	50	—		Non-album single
"CapSule" (with Hoshimachi Suisei)	2022	—	25	12		Shinigami Note
"Mera Mera"	2022	—	95	—		Shinigami Note
"I'm Greedy"	2022	—	—	—		Sinderella
"Nezumi Scheme"	2022	—	—	—		Sinderella
"Future Island" (未来島) (Note: "Future Island" is further included on select physical versions of Phantomime as a remix with Houshou Marine.)	2023	—	73	—		Jigoku 6
"Six Feet Under"	2023	—	—	—		Jigoku 6
"Sneaking" (Note: "Sneaking" is included on Phantomime as a remix with Lotus Juice; the original version of the song is not present on any version of the album.)	2023	—	—	—		Phantomime
"Overkill"	2024	—	—	—		Phantomime
"Tide" (with Ai)	2024	—	—	—		Phantomime
"Midnight Mayoi" (featuring Kobo Kanaeru)	2024	—	—	—		Phantomime
"Go-Getters" (Note: "Go-Getters" is included on Phantomime both as its original version and on digital and standard physical versions as a remix with Yoon of STAYC. Further stand-alone remixes feature Luss, as well as Ren Watanabe and Ryushin Handa of Psychic Fever.)	2024	41	43	—	JPN: 2,900 (digital)	Phantomime
"Flash Bang" (Note: "Flash Bang", "Seeing Stars", and "Sepia" are only included on select physical versions of Disasterpiece.) (with Pes)	2024	—	—	—		Disasterpiece
"Seeing Stars" (featuring Lotus Juice)	2025	—	99	—		Disasterpiece
"Sepia" (featuring Tooboe)	2025	—	—	—		Disasterpiece
"Die for You" (Note: "Die for You" is included on all versions of Disasterpiece as its original version; select physical versions additionally contain a remix with as of yet unconfirmed vocalists.)	2025	—	—	—		Disasterpiece
"Orpheus"	2025	—	—	—		Disasterpiece
"Let's Just Crash"	2025	39	39	—	JPN: 867 (digital)	Disasterpiece
"Gold Unbalance" (featuring Kento Nakajima)	2025	33	41	—	JPN: 1,172 (digital)	Disasterpiece
"Rivals and Equals"	2026	—	—	—		Disasterpiece
"Reimei Compass" (黎明Compass)	2026	21	21	—	JPN: 2,431 (digital)	Non-album singles
"Nightbreak"	2026	—	—	—		Non-album singles
"—" denotes releases that did not chart or were not released in that region.

==== As featured artist ====
Title	Year	Peak chart positions		Album
Title	Year	JPN Comb.	JPN Hot	Album
"Yona Yona Journey" (Taku Inoue featuring Mori Calliope)	2021	—	—	Aliens
"Wicked" (Hoshimachi Suisei featuring Mori Calliope)	2022	—	— (Note: "Wicked" did not enter the Billboard Japan Hot 100 chart but peaked at number 6 on the component Download Songs chart.)	Non-album single (Note: B-side of the single "Template/Wicked feat. Mori Calliope")
"Kira Killer" (綺羅キラー) (Zutomayo featuring Mori Calliope)	2022	39	32	Jinkougaku (沈香学)
"Ketatama" (ケタタマ) (Kerenmi featuring Mori Calliope)	2023	—	—	Interchange
"Fire N Ice" (Takanashi Kiara featuring Mori Calliope)	2023	—	—	Non-album singles
"Tsumi to Mitsu" (罪と蜜) (Syudou featuring Mori Calliope)	2025	—	—	Non-album singles
"Nekkyo" (熱狂) (Fake Type. featuring Mori Calliope)	2025	—	—	Non-album singles
"Dokuritsudoppo" (独立独歩) (Aiobahn +81 featuring Mori Calliope)	2025	—	—	Eau de Parfum ~Extended Play~
"—" denotes releases that did not chart or were not released in that region.

==== As collaborative artist ====
Title	Year	Peak chart positions	Album
Title	Year	JPN DL	Album
"Spiral Tones" (with Rikka)	2021	—	Non-album singles
"Journey Like a Thousand Years" (as Hololive English -Myth-)	2022	—	Non-album singles
"Reaper vs. Sheep -Ouen ver.-" (with Tsunomaki Watame)	2022	74	Non-album singles
"Reaper vs. Sheep -Kenko ver.-" (with Tsunomaki Watame)	2022	—	Non-album singles
"Non-Fiction" (as Hololive English -Myth-)	2022	—	Non-album singles
"Connect the World" (as Hololive English)	2023	—	Non-album singles
"ReUnion" (as Hololive English -Myth-)	2024	—	Non-album singles
"Breaking Dimensions" (as Hololive English)	2024	—	Non-album singles
"Start Again" (with IRyS, Nerissa Ravencroft and Elizabeth Rose Bloodflame)	2024	—	Non-album singles
"The Show Goes On!" (as Hololive English -Myth-)	2024	—	Non-album singles
"Odyssey" (as Hololive English)	2024	—	Non-album singles
"Over//Ride" (with Nerissa Ravencroft)	2025	64	Non-album singles
"Queen of the Night" (with Tokoyami Towa)	2025	76	Non-album singles
"Light" (with Kaf)	2025	—	Non-album singles
"Here Comes the CHADCast" (with Irys and Hakos Baelz)	2026	—	Non-album singles
"This is Myth" (as Hololive English -Myth-)	2026	—	Non-album singles
"—" denotes releases that did not chart or were not released in that region.

=== Promotional singles ===
Title	Year	Album
"Holy Shitto" (Holy嫉妬)	2022	Shinigami Note
"Carousel of Imaginary Images" (虚像のCarousel) (with Reol)	2023	Jigoku 6

=== Other charted songs ===
Title	Year	Peak chart positions	Album
Title	Year	JPN DL	Album
"Excuse My Rudeness, But Could You Please RIP?" (失礼しますが、RIP♡)	2020	14	Dead Beats
"—" denotes releases that did not chart or were not released in that region.

=== Guest appearances ===
Title	Year	Album
"Cloudy Sheep" (曇天羊, Donten Hitsuji) (Tsunomaki Watame featuring Mori Calliope)	2020	Watame no Uta Vol. 1 (わためのうたvol.１)
"Crown" (Boogey Voxx featuring Mori Calliope)	2021	Shibou-Teki Kansoku (死亡的観測)
"Villain Vibes" (AmaLee featuring Mori Calliope)	2022	Rise of the Monarch
"Tokyo Friday Night" (東京Friday Night) (Joint Beauty featuring Kana Hanazawa and Mori Calliope)	2024	YOLO Vol. 1
"Pao Ying Chub! Drinkin'" (LUSS with Mori Calliope)	2024	Is There Anything on the Moon?

== Filmography ==
=== Anime ===
List of English dubbing performances in animation
Year	Title	Role	Notes	Ref.
2026	Though I Am an Inept Villainess	Kou Tousetsu	Voice; English dub	

=== Web series ===
Year	Title	Role	Notes	Ref.
2026	Shattered Legends	Kaz Oogod	Actual play limited series using the Daggerheart system	

== Videography ==
=== Video albums ===
Title	Album details	Peak chart positions	Sales
Title	Album details	JPN BD	Sales
Mori Calliope Major Debut Concert "New Underworld Order"	Released: 3 May 2023; Label: EMI; Format: Blu-ray	6	JPN: 1,135
Mori Calliope 2nd Concert "Grimoire"	Released: 17 July 2026; Label: EMI; Format: Blu-ray	—	
"—" denotes releases that did not chart.

== Awards and nominations ==
Year	Ceremony	Category	Result	Ref.
2023	The Vtuber Awards	Best Music Vtuber	Won	
2024	The Vtuber Awards	Best Music Vtuber	Nominated	
2025	The Streamer Awards	Best Vtuber	Nominated	
