= Kiel Society for Film Music Research =

German academic society

The Kiel Society for Film Music Research was founded by a group of musicologists and film and media scholars in 2006 at Kiel University in Germany.

As an academic society the members organize annual national meetings as well as international conferences mainly on specific topics such as Jazz in Film (2011), Silent Film Sound (2013), and Music in TV Series (2015).

The society also publishes an open-access online journal entitled Kieler Beiträge zur Filmmusikforschung which includes twelve issues to date (2015). On occasion, articles from specialized conferences are published as proceedings. The Kiel Society for Film Music Research is a renowned institution in German-speaking countries that is promoting the research of film music issues at its conferences and stimulates the dialogue among practitioners from the realms of music and cinema.

== Proceedings of Kiel Conferences ==
- Tarek Krohn, Willem Strank: Film und Musik als multimedialer Raum. Schüren, Marburg 2012, ISBN 978-3-89472-767-3.
- Willem Strank, Claus Tieber: Jazz im Film. Beiträge zu einem intermedialen Phänomen. Lit Verlag, Münster 2014, ISBN 978-3-643-50614-6.
- Claus Tieber, Anna Katharina Windisch: The Sounds of Silent Films. New Perspectives on History, Theory and Practice. Palgrave, Hampshire 2014, ISBN 978-1-137-41071-9.
