= Suicide Squad Isekai =

Anime television series

- Key visual
- 異世界スーサイド・スクワッド
- Genre: Isekai; Superhero
- Based on: Characters from DC
- Developed by: Tappei Nagatsuki; Eiji Umehara
- Directed by: Eri Osada
- Music by: Kenichiro Suehiro
- Country of origin: Japan
- Original language: Japanese
- No. of episodes: 10

Production
- Producer: Shinya Tsuruoka
- Animator: Wit Studio
- Production company: Warner Bros. Japan

Original release
- Network: Tokyo MX, BS11
- Release: June 27 – August 15, 2024

Suicide Squad Isekai (Japanese: 異世界スーサイド・スクワッド, Hepburn: Isekai Sūsaido Sukuwaddo) is a Japanese anime television series based on the Suicide Squad from DC Comics. Presented by Warner Bros. Japan, it is produced by Wit Studio and directed by Eri Osada, with series composition by Tappei Nagatsuki and Eiji Umehara, character designs by Naoto Hosoda, based on the original character designs by manga artist Akira Amano, and music by Kenichiro Suehiro.

The ten-episode series premiered with three episodes on June 27, 2024, licensed by Warner Bros. Discovery for its HBO Max and Hulu in the United States, with several international regions also streaming on various other services on the same day. It aired from July 6 to September 7 in the same year on Tokyo MX and BS11. (Note: Tokyo MX and BS11 list the Japanese premiere as July 5, 2024, at 24:30, which is effectively July 6 at 12:30 a.m. JST)

The opening theme song is "Another World" composed by Tomoyasu Hotei, while the ending theme song is "Go-Getters" performed by Hololive-affiliated VTuber Mori Calliope.

== Synopsis ==
Amanda Waller, director of A.R.G.U.S., sends a team consisting of dangerous criminals Harley Quinn, Clayface, Deadshot, Peacemaker and King Shark on a mission to another world of magic and monsters. Joined by A.R.G.U.S. agent Rick Flag, this "Suicide Squad" is tasked with assisting a kingdom in battling against not only mythical creatures but also other super-villains that were sent to the other world before them. If they fail to complete their mission in time or attempt to flee, bombs installed in their bodies will blow up.

== Voice cast ==
The Suicide Squad as depicted in Suicide Squad Isekai from left to right: King Shark, Rick Flag, Peacemaker, Clayface, Deadshot and Harley Quinn

Character	Japanese voice actor	English voice actor
Dr. Harleen Quinzel / Harley Quinn	Anna Nagase	Karlii Hoch
The Joker	Yūichirō Umehara	Scott Gibbs
Floyd Lawton / Deadshot	Reigo Yamaguchi	Jovan Jackson
Christopher Smith / Peacemaker	Takehito Koyasu	Sean Patrick Judge
Basil Karlo / Clayface	Jun Fukuyama	Brandon Hearnsberger
Nanaue / King Shark	Subaru Kimura	Andrew Love
Rick Flag Jr.	Taku Yashiro	Jeremy Gee
Amanda Waller	Kujira	Jasmine Renee Thomas
Tatsu Yamashiro / Katana	Chika Anzai	Genevieve Simmons
Princess Fione	Reina Ueda	Luci Christian
Queen Aldora / The Undead King	Mamiko Noto / Yukari Tamura	Patricia Duran / Jade Kelly
Cecil	Jun Fukushima	John Gremillion
Otis Flannegan / Ratcatcher	Yōji Ueda	Adam Noble
The Thinker	Hōchū Ōtsuka	Jay Hickman
Dr. June Moon / Enchantress	Shizuka Itō	Christina Kelly
Waylon Jones / Killer Croc	Tarō Kiuchi	Joseph Palmore
Arthur the Dragon	Kokoa Amano	Chaney Moore

== Episodes ==
Note: Tomomi Kawaguchi joined series composition writers Tappei Nagatsuki and Eiji Umehara on screenplay for episodes 5, 7, and 9

No.	Title	Directed by (Note: Production staff information is taken from the ending credits of each episode)	Storyboarded by	Chief animation directed by	Original release date	Japanese air date
1	"Episode 1"	Eri Osada	Eri Osada	Hina Saotome	June 27, 2024	July 6, 2024
As the Joker and Harley Quinn wreak havoc in Gotham City, they are attacked by A.R.G.U.S. agents. The Joker escapes, but Harley is defeated and captured by Katana. Meanwhile, A.R.G.U.S.'s director Amanda Waller oversees the opening of a portal to another world. Six months later, she tasks Belle Reve inmates Harley, Deadshot, Clayface, Peacemaker, and King Shark with entering it to collect resources and implants time bombs in their necks that will explode in 72 hours unless they receive a signal from her regularly to discourage any escape attempts. Additionally, she blackmails Deadshot by threatening his daughter. As the squad enter the portal, their helicopter crashes in a world that Clayface calls an "Isekai" before they are ambushed by orcs and an army of knights, neither of whom they can understand. Despite repelling the orcs, they are captured by the knights and taken to a prison fortress. Elsewhere, Katana and several supervillains speak to a mysterious figure.
2	"Episode 2"	Kyōhei Suzuki	Taku Namiki	Hina Saotome	June 27, 2024	July 13, 2024
A royal court discusses the current war and their prisoners. Queen Aldora dismisses both the starving peasants and the squad's presence, but Princess Fione believes the latter may be of use and orders her elite knight Cecil to bring them to her. Meanwhile, following the squad's imprisonment, Clayface tries to escape, but the guards put magical handcuffs on him that negate his powers. They later meet an elite A.R.G.U.S. soldier named Rick Flag, who reveals he knows them, they are meant to serve as Waller's "Suicide Squad", their predecessors went missing six months ago, and he knows of an area where they can receive Waller's signal. Under threat of their bombs, Clayface releases the other inmates while the squad start a riot and successfully take over the prison. They are soon confronted by the knights who imprisoned them.
3	"Episode 3"	Asaka Yokoyama	Fuminori Kizaki	N/A	June 27, 2024	July 20, 2024
Before the squad can fight the knights, Flag stops them and attempts to reason with Cecil using words he learned from orc prisoners. Despite being insulted by this, Cecil follows through on Fione's orders. They soon meet Aldora and Fione, the latter of whom resembles Harley. After Aldora casts a translation spell to facilitate contact, Flag confesses that his previous squad escaped and became generals in the enemy forces. She demands the squad to be executed until Peacemaker convinces her to let them take on a mission from her instead. She accepts under the condition that Flag remains imprisoned until the mission succeeds. After the squad regain their equipment, they take advantage of Cecil's fight with an army of werewolves to sneak into the werewolves' fortress, where they encounter Ratcatcher, who holds a grudge against Deadshot for slandering and humiliating him while they were incarcerated together. Using a magic scepter, he takes control of a pack of werewolves to seek revenge. Though the squad defeats the werewolves, Katana rescues Ratcatcher, who intends to control a different army to kill the squad.
4	"Episode 4"	Ayumi Nakahata	Naoto Hosoda	Toshiaki Miki	July 4, 2024	July 27, 2024
In a flashback, a young Fione snuck out of the castle to befriend peasants, only for them to be killed in the war. In the present, Aldora refuses to release the squad despite their victory because they destroyed the enemy fortress. Harley berates Fione for reminding the former of her old self. As Cecil explains how the war that Aldora's kingdom is involved in has lasted decades, especially after the elves and beastmen betrayed them, Ratcatcher takes command of a beast army and approaches the castle. Harley recruits Aldora's prisoners to aid the squad, but Deadshot destroys Ratcatcher's scepter, causing his army to betray him and then surrender. As a reward, Cecil frees the squad, who leave to receive Waller's signal with twelve hours left on their bombs. The kingdom celebrates, though Aldora is displeased.
5	"Episode 5"	Sugoroku	Sugoroku & Daiki Yonemori	N/A	July 11, 2024	August 3, 2024
The squad reaches the portal, which is in the sky, in time to reset their bombs, giving them 72 more hours. They continue helping Aldora's kingdom, but Deadshot runs out of bullets. Flag says his helicopter, which was left on a mountain, has more weapons. En route, they stop and party with the former prisoners, who were left in charge of the fortress, and Harley acquires a magical size-shifting frying pan. Upon reaching the helicopter, they find a dragon made a nest with it before it attacks them. While Harley uses the frying pan to deflect its fire breath, Peacemaker distracts it by stealing its egg and Deadshot knocks it off the mountain with a rocket launcher. The egg hatches and the baby dragon imprints on Harley, who names it Arthur. Flag secretly contacts Waller and informs her of the situation. She tells him to kill the traitors in the previous squad. After acquiring the weapons, the squad returns with Arthur, but find the fortress on fire and the Enchantress and the Thinker looming in the sky.
6	"Episode 6"	Shūjirō Ami & Shigeki Awai	Shūjirō Ami	Yasuyuki Noda	July 18, 2024	August 10, 2024
After finding their friends from the prison have been executed by brainwashed elves, the squad fights them, Enchantress, and Thinker. King Shark is knocked into a lake, where he is beaten and knocked out by Killer Croc and a sea monster. Thinker makes Deadshot, Clayface, and Peacemaker experience nightmares, then shoots them with a gun after Enchantress disapproves of making them suffer. Enchantress asks Harley to join them, but Harley refuses. Flag claims he can make the rogues' bombs explode, but the trio call his bluff and leave. After Harley reunites with Deadshot, Clayface, and Peacemaker, the squad is re-imprisoned and Aldora declares they will be executed to deter incompetence. Finding this unfair, Fione and Cecil release them and provide a carriage. As the squad decides to take the fight to the villains, Thinker finds the portal and erects a tower to reach it.
7	"Episode 7"	Yūsuke Kubo	Yūsuke Kubo	Hina Saotome	July 25, 2024	August 17, 2024
With a few hours left on their bombs, the squad discovers Thinker built a tower and fortress around the portal and is guarded by Katana and brainwashed elves. Clayface infiltrates the fortress and imitates Thinker to distract Katana while the others distract the elves. Amidst this, Peacemaker captures one and tortures him to death, hurting the other elves due to Thinker linking their minds. As Harley engages Thinker, he enters her mind and sees a memory of Joker seducing her, but she commands the memory Joker to help her defeat Thinker, freeing the elves. As the fortress and tower collapse, Katana, who had defeated Clayface, kills Thinker and takes his Thinking Cap. Harley and Clayface join forces to defeat Katana, breaking her naginata and knocking her mask off, though she escapes. With their bombs reset once more, the squad celebrate by having Arthur burn down the enemy flag. When the kingdom receives word of the squad's victory, a furious Aldora orders them to be brought in dead or alive, horrifying and confusing Fione and Cecil.
8	"Episode 8"	Kyōhei Suzuki & Naoto Hosoda	Naoto Hosoda	Asuka Harada	August 1, 2024	August 24, 2024
The squad is invited back to the castle, but Aldora and her court refuse to thank them for their victories. One noble, ordered by Aldora before the squad's arrival, talks against them and slaps Harley, resulting in an enraged King Shark killing him. Aldora arrests King Shark and says he will be executed, then exiles the rest of the squad. Fione tries to apologize, but Harley tells her off for not standing up for them and leaves her baseball bat behind. The depressed squad gets drunk at a bar, but tempers flare and they start a bar brawl. The next day, Flag contacts Waller about resetting the bombs, but when he tells her what happened, she declares them failures and detonates Clayface's bomb. An enraged Flag tells her off, but they spot that the castle is on fire. Waller says they have 24 hours to salvage the situation or she will detonate the others. After the call ends, Clayface regenerates. Flag leads the squad in rescuing King Shark and the castle. Two hours prior, Fione visited Aldora's room to plead for King Shark's life, but was horrified to see Aldora's reflection in her mirror is that of a monster.
9	"Episode 9"	Chao Huo Ling	Ting Mu Yang	Asuka Harada	August 8, 2024	August 31, 2024
A minister uses the Thinking Cap to brainwash several knights and turn them against the others. Fione discovers the real Aldora was killed and replaced by the Undead King, who aims to spread death before Cecil rescues her. Tired of cowering, Fione assumes Harley's makeup and baseball bat before knocking out the minister, ending his control. As the Undead King summons skeletons to attack Aldora's subjects and floods the castle, Croc attacks Fione, but King Shark escapes his cell and intercepts him. The rest of the squad soon arrive to help fight the Undead King and the rogue squad. The Undead King calls on the Enchantress for help, but Arthur has a growth spurt and joins Cecil in aiding Harley and Deadshot in fighting her. Using a magic gem to enhance her gun, Harley defeats the Enchantress before interrogating her, deducing that she stopped the Thinker from killing the others and is serving the Undead King because someone she cares about is being held hostage. Meanwhile, Katana lures Clayface and Flag to a giant skeleton, where a woman resembling the Enchantress is being held in a magical bubble.
10	"Episode 10"	Eri Osada, Miyabi Inamori, Toshio Kiuchi & Masao Asami	Eri Osada, Yoshihiro Kanno & Masao Ōkubo	Hina Saotome	August 15, 2024	September 7, 2024
Flag and Clayface rescue the woman while Katana destroys the skeleton, but the Enchantress feels whatever she feels and goes berserk from pain. Peacemaker convinces the sea monster to turn on Croc and eat him. Cecil is wounded and gives his enchanted armor to Deadshot, granting him enhanced abilities. The Enchantress merges with the woman. Now that she is free, she pays back the squad by fighting the skeletons. Deadshot equips the rest of the squad except Flag with pieces of the armor, enhancing their powers so they can fight the Undead King. Harley and Fione distract the Undead King by disguising as each other before killing her. Fione takes the throne and rewards the squad with a feast. Flag calls Waller to report what happened and that Katana disappeared. Confused, Waller says Katana was with her the whole time. It is revealed that the Joker entered the other world at some point, gained the power to shape-shift, and masqueraded as Katana, among others, to manipulate the war for his own amusement.

== Development ==
According to Hiroyuki Ōmori in a July 2023 interview, he recalled around three/four years that Warner Bros. Japan pitched the idea of an anime from an existing DC comic title and approached Wit Studio if they were interested. He later said the following year in an interview with Newtype Japan that development on the anime began after the first Suicide Squad film was released.

== Marketing ==
To promote the anime, an "Isekai Great Villain Violent Party" was held at AnimeJapan in March 2024.

In December 2023, the first official trailer was released. In June 2024, a 30-second trailer was released online. A webtoon version was released the following month through Line Manga and Jump Toon.

== See also ==
- Vivy: Fluorite Eye's Song, an anime television series produced by Wit Studio and created by Tappei Nagatsuki and Eiji Umehara
