= Sucker for Love: First Date =

2022 video game

- Nintendo Switch icon art
- Developer: Akabaka
- Publisher: DreadXP
- Series: Sucker for Love
- Engine: GameMaker
- Platforms: Windows, Nintendo Switch
- Release: January 20, 2022 (Windows), December 19, 2022 (Switch)
- Genre: Dating sim
- Mode: Single-player

Sucker for Love: First Date is a parodic dating sim and horror-themed visual novel developed by indie developer Joseph "Akabaka" Hunter, and published by DreadXP. It was released on January 20, 2022, for Windows and December 19, 2022, for Nintendo Switch. The game revolves around a young man who obtains a pink version of the Necronomicon, and begins performing rituals to summon moe anthropomorphic beings from the Cthulhu Mythos, such as Ln'eta, a female version of Cthulhu, sacrificing his body parts and ultimately threatening the world with annihilation. The game received generally favorable reviews from critics, who praised its writing, voice acting and artwork, but criticized its short length, glitches, and low emphasis on romance for a dating sim. A sequel further exploring the Cthulhu Mythos, Sucker for Love: Date to Die For, was announced later in 2022.

== Gameplay ==
The player speaking to Ln'eta while in Darling's apartment. A "love" meter is shown in the top-right of the screen.

In addition to progressing text, the player can interact with objects in the game's environment in the style of an adventure game, and must also perform rituals using the Necronomicon in order to progress the story. It is possible to perform a ritual incorrectly, resulting in madness and a bad ending.

== Plot ==
Bankrolled by a woman named Missy, the main character, Darling, seeks "smooches" from Lovecraftian entities, using the Necronomicon's rituals to summon them. In order, he summons Ln'eta, a female interpretation of Cthulhu, Estir, a gender-flipped Hastur and Missy's true identity, and Nyanlahotep, a female Nyarlathotep with catgirl traits.

== Development ==
The game was developed using the GameMaker engine, and was nominated for its 2022 "best game" award. A shorter version of the game with only a 30-minute prelude and a single "love interest" was originally released for the Dread X Collection 2 game jam in 2020, one of a series of game jams organized due to the COVID-19 pandemic lockdown.

== Reception ==
Reception

Aggregate score
Aggregator	Score
Metacritic	77/100

Review score
Publication	Score
Destructoid	7/10

The game received an aggregate score of 77/100 on Metacritic for its PC version, indicating generally favorable reviews.

Iza Pogiernicka of CD-Action rated the game 9/10 points, called it one of the best dating sims she had ever played, and saying it was a perfect blend of comedy and horror. Zoey Handley of Destructoid rated the game 7/10 points, calling its writing "hilarious and clever" and its gameplay "eccentric". However, she criticized that the player did not get to pick a character to spend time with, instead progressing through each ritual in a linear fashion.

Alyssa Mercante of GamesRadar+ praised the game for subverting the source material, saying that gender-swapping Cthulhu into a "busty sex object" would make H. P. Lovecraft roll in his grave, which would be satisfying due to his racism. She characterized the game as a "fun, fresh take on dating sims". John Loeffler of TechRadar called Sucker for Love the best Lovecraftian video game since Darkest Dungeon, praising its game design and the fact that its story is from the point-of-view of a cultist, and noting that its kawaii elements made its horror "perverse". He stated that it was his game of the year, beating Elden Ring.

Some critics expressed disappointment at the emphasis on horror over romance or erotic elements, despite the game being billed as a dating sim. Rebecca Jones of Rock Paper Shotgun described the game as "the most chaste dating sim" she had ever played, while Handley called it "PG" with few jokes that made reference to anything lewd. Jones called the last segment of the game a "near-total genre shift" into survival horror that discarded the comedic aspects of the game.

== Sequel ==
An upcoming sequel, Sucker for Love: Date to Die For, was revealed at PAX West 2022 with a teaser trailer. The sequel takes place in a rural town, Sacramen-Cho, which has been plagued by a wave of mysterious disappearances, and contains further adventure game elements, like 360-degree backgrounds. The player finds a purple spellbook used by cultists, using it to summon Rhok'zan, the Black Goat of the Woods.
