= Sucker for Love: Date to Die For =

2024 video game

- Steam thumbnail image
- Developer: Akabaka
- Publisher: DreadXP
- Series: Sucker for Love
- Platform: Windows
- Release: April 23, 2024
- Genre: Dating sim
- Mode: Single-player

Sucker for Love: Date to Die For is a parodic horror dating sim visual novel developed by Joseph "Akabaka" Hunter and published by DreadXP. The sequel to Sucker for Love: First Date, it was released April 23, 2024, for Microsoft Windows. A loose adaptation of H. P. Lovecraft's The Shadow over Innsmouth, its main character, Stardust, enters an isolated town while investigating a series of mysterious disappearances. She soon discovers that a goat-like fertility goddess known as Rhok'zan has been trapped by cultists, who are misusing her for dark rituals, and must help free her from them while keeping her unharmed. The game's aesthetic takes heavy inspiration from 1990s anime. It received positive reviews from critics, who cited its gameplay, graphics and writing, considering it a more polished and newcomer-friendly entry than its predecessor and praising its inclusiveness.

== Gameplay ==
The player conversing with Rhok'zan

The game is set in a large, ever-changing Japanese-style house in the town of Sacramen-cho. The player, upon finding Rhok'zan, must explore the house in an adventure game manner to find materials and perform occult rituals while avoiding death at the hands of murderous cultists, some encounters of which are portrayed as optional jump scares. The main character, Stardust, may also flirt with Rhok'zan, but the game can be played without anything sexually suggestive. Stardust is portrayed as an asexual lesbian, and can use a spray bottle to ward off Rhok'zan's attempts to invoke lust.

== Plot ==
The main character, Stardust, investigates mysterious disappearances in her hometown, Sacramen-cho. Finding herself kidnapped, she has no choice but to use the cultists' spellbook to summon Rhok'zan, The All-Mother and Black Goat of the Woods, an anthropomorphic goat who is a parody of Shub-Niggurath, to attempt to escape. The game has multiple endings.

== Development ==
Stardust was made asexual to contrast with Rhok'zan, a goddess of lust and fertility. Thus, despite Rhok'zan's temptations, she is solely focused on her investigation. The idea of a black protagonist was inspired by Lovecraft Country, which used a historical narrative about bigotry to draw attention to Lovecraft's racist themes. The episode "Sundown", about a "sundown town" in which black people would be unsafe, parallels the cultists' control of Sacramen-cho. Hunter refuted the idea that her race was due to a "diversity quota", saying he believed she was the best character for the story.

== Reception ==
Elijah Gonzalez of Paste Magazine called the game one of the best at PAX East 2023, calling its writing earnest, in contrast to cynical romance/horror "fake-out" titles. Stating that he enjoyed its "old-school anime" aesthetic, and was "drawn in" by the contrast between its "lively" art style and "oppressive mood", he believed it could be an indie hit. Rebecca Jones of Rock Paper Shotgun called the game one of her most anticipated of 2023, saying that while she had hoped it would be a direct sequel to the original title, she was nevertheless delighted that the first game was part of a planned trilogy, and that it would be released not long after the first, jokingly saying that the game's concept was "relaxing" and "not at all menacing". Allisa James of TechRadar praised the game for "breaking new ground" with its asexual lead character, as well as maintaining a Lovecraftian feel while avoiding alienating people with its themes, singling out its use of glowing eyes to represent cult members for being racially agnostic. She urged people to play the game, citing the depth of the main character's story.

Ryuichi Matsumoto of 4Gamer.net expressed interest in the game, but wrote that it was strange that a game with an anime introduction and inspirations did not have Japanese-language support, noting it was targeted at Western anime fans. He suggested that Japanese players try it despite this, in the hope that the developer would consider adding a Japanese localization.

Post-release, Rebecca Jones of VG247 called it "a stylish and well-written visual novel" that stood out from others, while balancing a horror and love story. Kara Phillips of PC Gamer also recommended the game, describing the gameplay as unnerving, and Rhok'zan as a heavily likeable character.
