= YouTube Theater =

Music and theatre venue in Inglewood, California

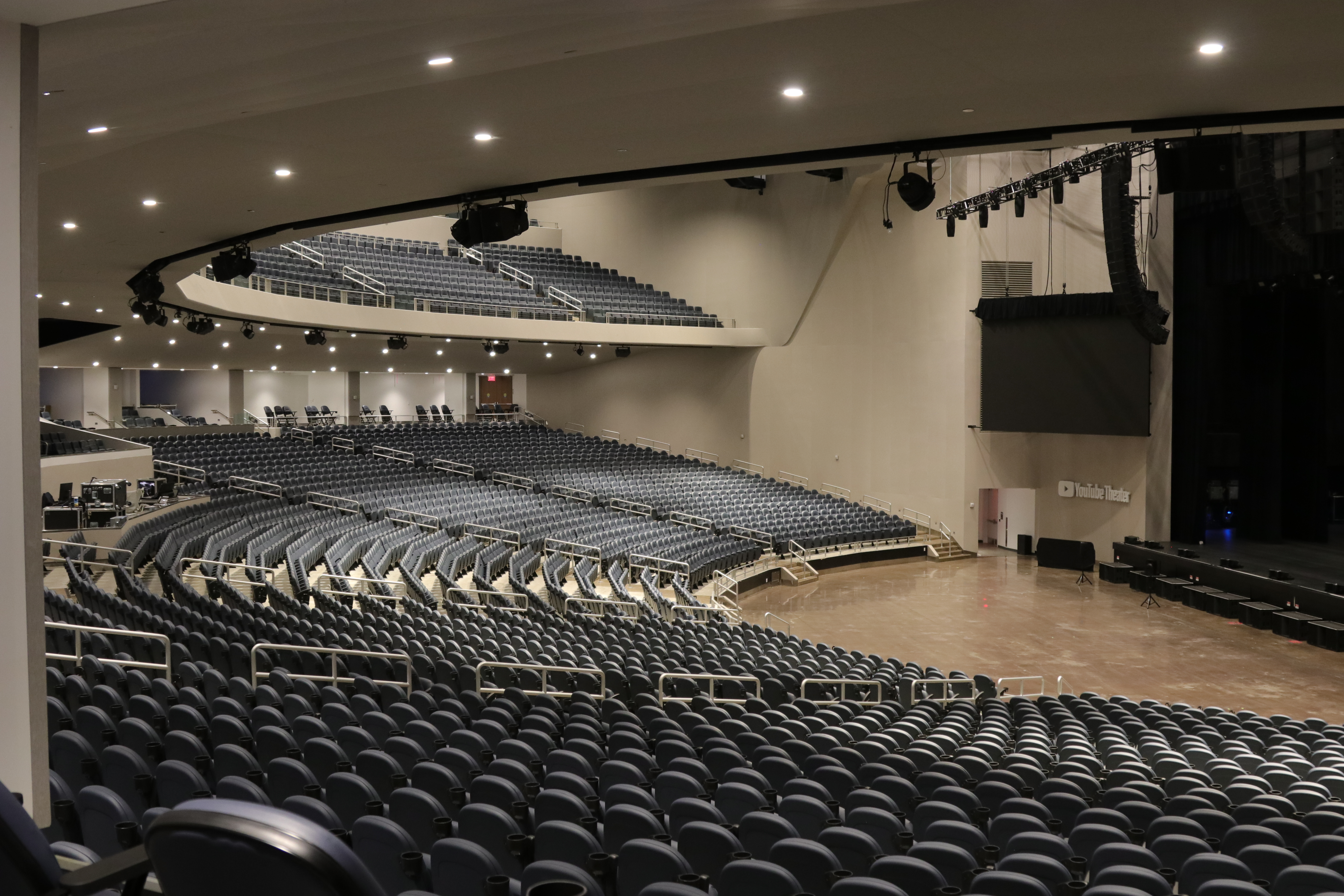
- Interior of YouTube Theater in 2022

- Location within the Los Angeles metropolitan area Location within California Location within the United States
- Address: 1011 Stadium Dr
- Location: Inglewood, California, United States
- Coordinates: 33°57′6″N 118°20′12″W
- Owner: Kroenke Sports & Entertainment
- Operator: StadCo LA
- Capacity: 6,000
- Type: Theatre
- Public transit: Hawthorne/Lennox (via shuttle bus); Downtown Inglewood station

Construction
- Opened: August 9, 2021; 5 years ago
- Architect: HKS, Inc.

Website
- Venue Website

YouTube Theater is a 6,000+ seat music and theater venue in Inglewood, California, United States, located under the same structure that houses SoFi Stadium, the home of the National Football League's Los Angeles Rams and Los Angeles Chargers. It is part of the Hollywood Park entertainment complex, a master planned neighborhood in development on the site of the former Hollywood Park Racetrack.

== History ==
Plans for a 6,000-seat performance venue go back as far as 2015, when Stan Kroenke, owner of the then-named St. Louis Rams, announced his plan to build an NFL stadium and entertainment complex on the former Hollywood Park Racetrack. Construction on the stadium and theater broke ground the following year in November 2016.

On June 28, 2021, it was announced that Google's video-sharing platform YouTube had acquired the naming rights to the theater for 10 years.

The venue opened on August 9, 2021, with an official ribbon-cutting ceremony. Mexican rock band Caifanes held the first event at the theater on September 4, 2021. The venue hosted its first esports event in late March 2022, with the Rocket League Championship Series (RLCS) Winter Major, marking RLCS's first live event in two years.

== Design ==
YouTube Theater was designed by Dallas-based architectural firm HKS, Inc. The 227,000 square foot, three-story venue can seat anywhere between 3,400 and 6,000 spectators. The venue also features six luxury boxes and a 3,500 square foot club with 140 premium seats. The theater is designed to be an intimate venue, with the furthest seat being situated 164 feet from the stage. The venue features a sound system designed by L-Acoustics.
