= Ayano Sudo =

Japanese contemporary artist

- 須藤絢乃
- Born: 1986 (age 39–40)
- Education: Kyoto City University of Arts
- Awards: Canon New Cosmos Photography Competition
- Website: ayanosudo.tumblr.com

Ayano Sudo (須藤絢乃; born 1986) is a Japanese contemporary artist and photographer. She won the 2014 Canon New Cosmos Photography Competition and photographs professionally for Japanese magazines such as Spoon and FREECELL. Her works have been shown domestically in Japan and internationally and are included in the collections of museums such as the Tokyo Photographic Art Museum and the George Eastman Museum (Rochester, New York).

== Early life ==
Sudo was born and raised in Osaka, Japan, in 1986. Her first experience with photography began when she was seven years old, using a disposable camera to capture cats and images from Japanese magazines that she enjoyed.

She notes in an interview that Diane Arbus influenced her. In her youth, she loved Japanese fashion and Japanese shojo manga like The Rose of Versailles and Candy Candy. As an elementary school student, she aspired to become a shojo manga artist, and in her teens, she wanted to work as a fashion designer and photographer; both influences have made their way into her artistic aesthetic.

== Academic career ==
She graduated from the Akashi Prefectural High School with a major in art in 2005. After enrolling in the Kyoto City University of Arts, Sudo studied in France as an exchange student at the École des Beaux-Arts in Paris. While in university, Sudo experimented with various mediums, such as making life-sized human figures.

During her time at the Kyoto City University of Arts in 2009, she was awarded the Mayor's Prize at the Kyoto City University of Arts Art Exhibition. In 2010, she received the MIO Photo Encouragement Award and Special Jury Prize.

In 2011, she graduated from the Kyoto City University of Arts with an M.A. in conceptual design.

== Photographic style ==
In an interview with The New York Times, Sudo notes that when she was in Paris studying as an exchange student, she saw photographs by a German photographer that claimed to recreate "Harajuku style." But Sudo felt that these images were not representative of the kawaii or Harajuku style, so upon returning to Japan, she began to take self-portraits in various styles, including images that invoked this style that she felt had been misrepresented.

She says various Japanese arts, such as Takarazuka Revue and casual Kabuki, where actors take on roles of the opposite gender, inspired her gender-bending photographs. In some of Sudo's works, it is difficult to assign a gender to her photographic subjects. Sudo says she "loves images of androgynes" and that when she was younger, she "wanted to be a boy who wears girl's clothing." These kinds of formative experiences have a significant influence on her various photographic styles.

While some of her works are gender-fluid, others invoke dreamlike femininity and are heavily inspired by Japanese kawaii, Lolita, and Harajuku culture. Sudo often heavily retouches her photographs to achieve various visual effects inspired by purikura photo booths. She uses glitter and rhinestones photographs to achieve a glamorizing kawaii effect. In an interview, she defines her concept of kawaii: "I think the meaning of the Japanese word is not limited to 'cute.' Kawaii includes something grotesque, bizarre, weird, creepy, crazy, and beautiful."

== Gespenster ==
Sudo's Gespenster series won the New Cosmos of Photography Grand Prize organized by Canon. She titled this series, Gespenster, from the German word for ghost, which she encountered while reading Junichiro Tanizaki's book The Makioka Sisters.

Gespenster is a series of self-portraits featuring herself dressed up as girls who have gone missing. Researching information from missing person reports, she recreates their physical features and clothing when these missing girls were last seen. In his capacity as a judge for the New Cosmos of Photography Competition, Noi Sawaragi, Japanese art critic, observed that Sudo captures the "dangers faced by and the fragility of the young generation in Japan through the gap that cannot be filled between the missing girls who have become eternal beings who will never age and artist who, herself is aging, plays the role of missing girls." He goes on to compare Sudo to Cindy Sherman but "digested and adapted to a Japanese context."

Holoholo Books in France published a photobook of her Gespenster series.

== Critical reception ==
In her essay, "Sudo Ayano's Portrait Photography: Artificially Modified Beauties and the Uncanny," Nava Astrachan critically analyzes Sudo's photographic portraits in various sociological, psychoanalytical, and historical contexts.

Astrachan first establishes that Sudo's subtle alterations in her portrait photography invoke the unsettling impression of the uncanny for the viewer. Astrachan frames Sudo's photographic alterations in the contemporary context of contemporary Japanese cultures, such as Shojo-manga, purikura, Harajuku-style, and kawaii culture. For Sudo, "the eccentricity that is part of the Kawaii aesthetic is achieved mainly by combining the typically drawn two-dimensional images of shojo-manga with the innate hyperrealism of post-photographic media, namely, Photoshop and other forms of digital manipulation." This effect creates portraits that seem to look artificial and human simultaneously; Astrachan connects this idea to Ernst Jentsch and Sigmund Freud's dispute regarding the uncanny through the analysis of The Sandman by E.T.A. Hoffman; Mori Masahiro's Uncanny Valley Effect; and Phillip Smith's discussion of the abject and social pollution belonging to a liminal space, expanding on Julia Kristeva's Powers of Horror: An Essay on Abjection.

Astrachan explains how Sudo's works can be understood to subvert "conventional ideas of beautify and body images" in the changing normative environment regarding cosmetic surgery. Astrachan builds on Mori's technologically oriented Uncanny Valley Effect by framing it within evolving societal norms regarding artificially modified bodies. Astrachan says that although Sudo's works can be understood as a reflection of expanding social norms, they can also be understood as a reflection of "historical-traditional aesthetic ideas regarding the desirability and charm of the female figure" in the context of traditional Kabuki theater like onnagata, and Bunraku puppetry. She argues that in these traditional contexts, there was a "symbolic affiliation of feminine bodily perfection with artificiality." This historical grounding allows Astrachan to discuss how Sudo's portraits contribute to the "noticeable tendency of the contemporary fashion industry and prominent Japanese theatrical and visual traditions… to blue gender boundaries and emphasize gender ambiguity."

== Publications ==
- Sudo, Ayano (2014). Gespenstr (in English and Japanese). France: Holoholo. ISBN 979-10-92149-05-0.

== Exhibitions ==
=== Solo exhibitions ===
- Ayano Sudo Exhibition (1839 Gallery, Taipei, Taiwan, 2011)
- Omokage, Autoscopy (Hillside Forum, Tokyo, Japan, 2015)
- Ayano Sudo Photo Exhibition Anima/Animus – Kuniyoshi Kaneko's Room (Ginza Mitsukoshi 7th Floor Gallery, Tokyo, Japan, 2018)

=== Group exhibitions ===
- AIPAD Photography Show, (Park Avenue Armory, New York, 2014)
- I know something about love, Asian contemporary photography (Tokyo Photographic Art Museum, Japan, 2018)
- New Planet Photo City – William Klein and Photographers Living in the 22nd Century (21_21 DESIGN SIGHT, Tokyo, 2018)
- Internet of (No) Things: Ubiquitous Networking and Artistic Intervention (Jogja National Museum, Yogyakarta, Indonesia, 2018)
- Self/Others (Canon Gallery, Tokyo, Japan, 2018)

== Collections ==
Sudo's work is held in the following permanent collections:

- Tokyo Photographic Art Museum, Tokyo
- George Eastman Museum, Rochester, New York
