= Yasue =

- Gender: Female

Origin
- Origin: Japanese
- Meaning: Different meanings depending on the kanji used

Yasue (written: 康江, 恭江 or やすえ in hiragana) is a feminine Japanese given name. Notable people with the name include:

- Yasue Funayama (舟山 康江; born 1966), Japanese politician
- Yasue Hatsuda (初田 恭江; born 1959), Japanese swimmer
- Yasue Maetake (born 1973), American sculptor
- Yasue Sato (さとう やすえ; born 1978), Japanese model and actress

Yasue (written: 安江) is also a Japanese surname. Notable people with the surname include:

- Norihiro Yasue (安江 仙弘; 1886–1950), Imperial Japanese Army officer
- Takaya Yasue (born 1996), Japanese swimmer
- Yasue Kodama (児玉 靖枝; born 1961), Japanese artist

== See also ==
- 8101 Yasue, a main-belt asteroid
