= Android science =

Interdisciplinary framework

Android science is an interdisciplinary framework for studying human interaction and cognition based on the premise that a very humanlike robot (that is, an android) can elicit human-directed social responses in human beings. The android's ability to elicit human-directed social responses enables researchers to employ an android in experiments with human participants as an apparatus that can be controlled more precisely than a human actor.

While mechanical-looking robots may be able to elicit social responses to some extent, a robot that looks and acts like a human being is in a better position to stand in for a human actor in social, psychological, cognitive, or neuroscientific experiments. This gives experiments with androids a level of ecological validity with respect to human interaction found lacking in experiments with mechanical-looking robots.

An experimental setting for human-android interaction also provides a testing ground for models concerning how cognitive or neural processing influence human interaction, because models can be implemented in the android and tested in interaction with human participants. In android science, cognitive science and engineering are understood as enjoying a synergistic relationship in which the results from a deepening understanding of human interaction and the development of increasingly humanlike androids feed into each other.

Android science can be broadly construed to include all the effects of engineered human likeness, such as the impact of humanlike robots on society or the study of the relationship between anthropomorphism and human perception. The latter relates to an observation made by Masahiro Mori that human beings are more sensitive to deviations from humanlike behavior or appearance in near-human forms. Mori refers to this phenomenon as the uncanny valley.

== See also ==
- Affective computing
- Android
- Cognitive science
- Human-robot interaction
- Robot
- Uncanny valley
