= Tomoaki Ishihara =

Japanese artist

Ishihara Tomiaki (石原友明) is a Japanese artist born in Osaka in 1959. He graduated from Kyoto City University of Arts in 1984. Ishihara works in various mediums such as photograph, painting, and sculpture.

== Style ==
He was a part of the Kansai New Wave movement of the 1980s. Some of his works include leather sculptures, three-dimensional works that resemble plush toys, paintings that use braille, self-portraits printed onto boat shaped canvases, blurred photographs and digitized images of his hair on canvas.

== Exhibitions ==
In 1985, he participated in a three-person show with Yasumasa Morimura and Hiroshi Kimura at Galerie 16 in Kyoto.

In 1998 he held a solo exhibition at the Tochigi Prefectural Art Museum, Passage to a Museum, and in 2004 Otani Memorial Art Museum in 2004, Self Portraits – Me and What Lies Behind.

He has also been included in major group shows including Starting points: Japanese Art of the ‘80s at the 21st Century Museum of Contemporary Art, Kanazawa; Photographic Distance at Tochigi Prefectural Museum of Fine Art; and Japanorama New Vision on Arts in Japan Since 1970 at The Centre Pompidou Metz in France. Vanishing Points, Contemporary Japanese Art organized by The Japan Foundation and exhibited at the National Gallery of Modern Art, New Delhi in 2008.

His work, Engagement IV, a huge installation in which he printed his self-portrait on a boat-shaped canvas, was included in the Aperto section of the 1988 Venice Biennale.
