= Natsuko Tanihara =

Japanese artist

- Born: 1989 (age 36–37); Saitama Prefecture, Japan
- Education: Kyoto City University of Arts

Natsuko Tanihara (谷原菜摘子)(born 1989) was born in Saitama Prefecture, Japan. She completed her BFA and graduate studies in oil painting at the Kyoto City University of Arts. From 2017 to 2018, she received a grant from the former Gotoh Memorial Foundation and stayed in Paris, France. After returning to Japan, she went back to school for her PhD in Fine Arts. She is the recipient of numerous domestic awards and continues her production based in the Kansai region. She works in various mediums but is known for her signature works using velvet as a support and her use of decorative materials such as glitter, sequin and rhinestones.

== Recognition ==
Tanihara has garnered various awards and accolades throughout the years. The following is not exhaustive.

In 2015, as a student at the Kyoto City University of Arts, she won the Koji Kinutani Award, the prize was established to promote figurative painters under the age of 35 by Mainichi Shimbun to support young painters. She participated in the VOCA, Vision of Contemporary Art Exhibition in 2016. The show is held every year at the Ueno Royal Museum where young artists under the age of 40 are picked up by museum curators. She won the Shoreisho, the second place prize. She received the Gotoh Memorial Cultural Award's Newcomer's Prize of Art in 2017 and spent one year in Paris on a grant from the Former Gotoh Memorial Culture Foundation. In 2017, she received the Best Young Artist Award given by the City of Kyoto. In 2020, Tanihara has participated in the ARKO Artists in Residence in Kurashiki, Ohara. This Ohara Museum of Art program supports young artists by offering them the use of the studio of Torajiro Kojima, a Yōga style painter. The museum is the first private museum focused on western art in Japan and was established in 1930 by Magosaburo Ohara. She was introduced in the Japanese television program Break Zenya in October, 2020. The BS Fuji television program introduces young artists. In 2021, the City of Osaka presented Tanihara with the Sakuya Konohana Award. The award is given to promising young artists who have contributed to the development of the culture of Osaka City.

== Artistic Style ==
Tanihara has experimented with various materials throughout her life. As an elementary school student, she would often grind glass, eggshells or seashells that she found and would collage them into her pastel drawings. In an interview with Sankei Shimbun, Tanihara relates a story about how she began to use velvet as a support instead of canvas. She had entered university to study Nihonga style painting because she loved the work of Iwasa Matabei but left the department after half a year and switched to the Yōga, western style painting, department. After switching departments, she says that she didn't like traditional white canvas because she felt her brush "wouldn't move" the way she wanted. After hearing that the American Abstract Expressionist Julian Schnabel painted on velvet, she experimented with the material and has continued using it ever since.

In interviews with other various publications, she has said that her expression focuses on the dark legacy of humanity but presented through the aesthetic prism of decorative beautification. She often mixes mica, glitter, rhinestones and sequin into her paints and collages other decorative materials into her works. After her year-long grant-supported travels in Europe, she has experimented with works on paper using pastels. While she had used pastels on paper for studies for her larger velvet works, she began to work in earnest on her drawings on paper because she did not have a studio space during her time in Europe.

In an interview conducted upon receiving the Sakuya Konohana Award from the City of Osaka, she explains that her works spring from narratives of her own creation. She postulates that narrative creation has been central to artistic creation and cites the example of scroll works from the late Heian period such as Stories of Hungry Ghosts. She argues that the narrative behind these works were most likely imagined by people to help them rationalize the unfair phenomenon that beset them.

== Influences ==
In her interview with Sankei Shimbun, she notes a formative memory from kindergarten when she saw Claude Monet's painting of Camille on her deathbed. She felt "goosebumps and could really feel that the woman depicted was dying." Feeling the potential of the medium of painting, she thought one day she would become an artist. Although she dreamt of being an artist, she was discouraged by her peers and teachers, as well as her father. Only her mother supported her dream to become an artist.

Due to her mother's illness, as a child she was often sent to her mother's hometown in rural Aomori where she had the opportunity to see and wear Japanese kimono. In an interview she did when she won the Sakuya Konohana Award from City of Osaka, she said has strong memories of being scared of the darkness of her grandparents' home, exacerbated by the fact that her grandparents would go to sleep around 7PM. The interviewer Noriko Ishibashi connects the decorative materiality of Tanihara's works to her exposure to kimono and her interest in the Royal French and Imperial Chinese ornamentations.

As a junior high school student, she moved to Hokkaido from her birthplace in Saitama due to her father's work where she was bullied and experienced a serious injury. In an interview with the Japanese Art magazine, Bijutsu Techo, she notes that this experience created a desire in her to reveal the "darkness of human beings." She explains that although modernization has brought a sterilizing light that seems reveals all, through her works she insists that there is still a "dreadful darkness that exists."

The writer, Masaki Toshikazu, suggests that her brief experience in the Nihonga department of Kyoto University and her initial interest in Nihonga can be found in many of the Japanese motifs in her work.

Her time in Europe was spent going to many museums. She said she prioritized "looking more than painting" as she travelled around to various places in Europe like France, Germany, Switzerland, Poland, and Belgium to visit museums and galleries. In her interview with Bijutsu Techo, Tanihara notes that she was particularly interested in contrast between highly detailed figures and distorted spaces in the works of Northern Renaissance artists. She singles out Bathesheba at her Bath by Rembrandt as making a strong impression on her as well as the works of Grünewald, Jan van Eyck and Hans Memling. She felt stylistically validated observing firsthand the violence in many of these works and gained a renewed sense of confidence in the direction of her chosen subject matter. Her interaction with European art on this trip allowed her to choose her motifs more freely. Many of her works prior to her trip to Europe had Japanese settings, but after her trip, she began to experiment with new settings such as supermarkets, meadows, and restrooms; and new depictions of people outside of her personal circle. Also her time in Europe led to an increase in production of works on paper due to her lack of studio space.

In more recent years she said that she has been deeply inspired by the intensity of video works of artists such as Pierre Huyghe and Matthew Barney.

== Critical reception ==
Nakai Yasuyuki, chief curator at the National Museum of Art, Osaka, positions Tanahara as a "Modern Ukiyo-e Painter" as indicated by the title of his essay for one of Tanihara's solo shows at MEM Gallery in Tokyo. For Nakai, Iwase Matabei is one of the formative figures in the history of Ukiyo-e paintings, arguing that from the medium's inception its subject matter has focused on the macabre as evidenced in Iwasa's magnum opus The Tale of Yamanaka Tokiwa, a depiction of the "masochistic act of recreating the cruel murder of his own mother." Nakai does a comparative analysis of Iwasa and Tanihara, whose works "are [spun] together from painful memories [experienced] by the artist." While ukiyo-e genre images from later periods such as the peaceful Edo period typically depict "scenes of young men and women enjoying themselves," Nakai argues that Tanihara is the "true successor" to "the spirit of Iwasa Matabei" whose works are "imbued with a shadow of death."
