= Creepiness =

Causing an unpleasant feeling of fear or unease

Creepiness is the state of being creepy, or causing an unpleasant feeling of fear or unease to someone and/or something. Certain traits or hobbies may make people seem creepy to others; interest in horror or the macabre might come across as 'creepy', and often people who are perverted or exhibit predatory behavior are called 'creeps'. The internet, especially some functions of social media, has been described as increasingly creepy. Adam Kotsko has compared the modern conception of creepiness to the Freudian concept of unheimlich. The term has also been used to describe paranormal or supernatural phenomena. Some people have phobias which are irrational fears, which can make them perceive something as creepy.

== History and studies ==
"Creepiness" is subjective: for example some dolls have been described as creepy, while what makes something "creepy" or "strange" to someone might seem normal to someone else.

The adjective "creepy", referring to a feeling of creeping in the flesh, was first used in 1831, but it was Charles Dickens who coined and popularized the term "the creeps" in his 1849 novel David Copperfield.

In the 20th century, association was made between involuntary celibacy and creepiness.

The concept of creepiness has only recently been formally addressed in social media marketing.

The sensation of creepiness has only recently been the subject of psychological research, despite the widespread colloquial use of the word throughout the years. Francis T. McAndrew of Knox College is the first psychologist to do an empirical study on creepiness.

== Causes ==
The state of creepiness has been associated with "feeling scared, nervous, anxious or worried", "awkward or uncomfortable", "vulnerable or violated" in a study conducted by Watt et al. This state arises in the presence of a creepy element, which can be an individual or, as recently observed, new technologies.

=== Individuals ===
Creepiness can be caused by the appearance of an individual. Another study investigated the characteristics that make people creepy. Creepy people were thought to be more often male than female by an overwhelming majority of participants (around 95% of both male and female participants). Another study conducted by Watt et al. also found that participants associated the ectomorphic body type (more linear) with creepiness, more than the other two body types (51% vs mesomorphic, 24% and endomorphic, 23%). Other cues of creepiness included low hygiene, especially according to female participants, and a disheveled appearance. Participants also identified the face as an area with potentially creepy features: in particular the eyes and the teeth. Both of those physical features were deemed creepy not only for their unpleasant appearance (ex. squinty eyes or crooked teeth) but also for the movements and expressions they engaged it (ex. darting eye movements and odd smiles).

In fact, appearance does not seem to be the only factor making an individual creepy: behaviors provide cues as well. Behaviors such as "being unusually quiet and staring (34%), following or lurking (15%), behaving abnormally (21%), or in a socially awkward, "sketchy" or suspicious way (20%)" are all contributing to a feeling of creepiness, as described by Watt et al.'s study.

=== Technology ===
In addition to other individuals, new technologies, such as marketing's targeted ads and AI, have been qualified as creepy.

A study by Moore et al. described what aspect of marketing participants considered creepy. The main three reasons are the following: using invasive tactics, causing discomfort and violating of norms. Invasive tactics are practiced by marketers that know so much about the consumer that the ads are "creepily" personalized. Secondly, some ads create discomfort by making the consumer question "the motives of the company advertising the product". Finally, some ads violate social norms by having inappropriate content, for example by unnecessarily sexualizing it.

It is marketing's extensive knowledge used in an improper way, together with a certain loss of control over our data, that creates a feeling of creepiness.

Another creepy aspect of technology is human-looking AI: this phenomenon is called the uncanny valley.

Humans find robots creepy when they start closely resembling humans. It has been hypothesized that the reason why they are viewed as creepy is because they violate our notion of how a robot should look. A study focusing on children's responses to this phenomenon found evidence to support the hypothesis.

== Evolutionary explanation ==
Several studies have hypothesized that creepiness is an evolutionary response to potentially dangerous situations. It could be linked to a mechanism called agent detection which makes individuals expect malignant agents to be responsible for small changes in the environment. McAndrew et al. illustrates the idea with the example of a person hearing some noises while walking in a dark alley. That person would go in high alert, fearing that some dangerous individual was there. If that was not the case the loss would be small. If, on the other hand, a dangerous individual was actually in the alley and the person had not been alerted by this creepy feeling, the loss could have been significant.

Creepiness would therefore serve the purpose of alerting us in situations in which the danger is not outright obvious but rather ambiguous. In this case, ambiguity both refers to the possible presence of a threat and to its nature, sexual or physical for example. Creepiness "may reside in between the unknowing and the fear" in the sense that individuals experiencing it are unsure if there truly is something to fear or not. Creepy characteristics are not simply caused by threat potential: in fact, ectomorphic body types are not the most powerful bodies and facial expressions are not a proxy of physical strength either. Therefore, creepiness is not only related to how threatening a characteristic is, in the sense of how dangerous and strong the individual can be. There are more facets to consider.

Another characteristic of creepiness is unpredictable behavior. Unpredictability links back to this idea of ambiguity. When an individual is unpredictable it is not possible to tell when their behavior will turn violent: this adds to the ambiguity of a potentially dangerous situation. This theory is endorsed by studies. Not only is unpredictability directly listed as a creepy characteristic, but other behaviors, such as norm-breaking behaviors are indirectly linked with unpredictability. Such behaviors show that the individual does not conform to some social standards others would expect in a given situation. For example, the aforementioned staring at strangers or lack of hygiene—behaviors that make us uneasy or creeped out because they do not fit the norm and therefore are not expected. More generally, participants tended to define creepiness as "different" in the sense of not behaving, or looking, socially acceptable. Such differences point towards a "social mismatch".

Humans have a natural system of detection of such mismatch: a physical feeling of coldness. When an individual is creeped out, they report feeling those "cold chills". This phenomenon has been studied by Leander et al, with relation to nonverbal mimicry in social interactions, meaning the unintentional copying of another's behavior. Inappropriate mimicry may leave a person feeling like something is off about the other. Absence of non-verbal mimicry in a friendly interaction, or the presence of it in a professional setting, raises suspicion as it does not follow the relevant social norms. Individuals are left wondering what other unusual behavior the other might engage in.

== See also ==
- Ableism
- Internet privacy
- Social skills
