= Yasue Kodama =

- 児玉靖枝
- Born: 1961 (age 64–65); Hyōgo Prefecture
- Occupation: Artist

Yasue Kodama (児玉靖枝) is a Japanese artist born in Hyogo in 1961. She graduated from the Kyoto City University of Arts with a B.A. in Oil Painting in 1984 and an M.A. in painting in 1986. Kodama's early works consist primary of still life works but she shifted to more abstract works in the 1990s but then turns back towards the representational in the 2000s. She has received various awards throughout her career, such as the 34th Kyoto Fine Arts and Culture Award in 2021, and has participated numerous group exhibition such as VOCA: Vision of Contemporary Art exhibitions and Monet's Legacy at the Yokohama Museum of Art in 2018. Her works are included in various public collections across Japan. She has also taught painting at her alma mater, the Kyoto City University of Arts.

== Artistic development ==
=== Early works ===
In an interview for Art Okuru, Kodama explains that when she first started making artwork in the 1980s, she felt caught between the two pervading artistic frameworks of conceptual art and expressionistic works that seemed to “explode from within.” Due to this seemingly polarized environment she decided to simply paint what was in front of her and focused on still life oil paintings.

As a student, she would spend copious amounts of time, three to four months, painting detailed stones and other motifs. It was through this process and her exposure to Georgio Morandi at her professor's suggestion that she became interested in the idea of pictorial space which nudged the trajectory of her work away from realism.

=== Shift to abstraction ===
In an interview with Chikako Ikegami in the Winter 1993 edition of Japanese art magazine, Contemporary Artists Review, Kodama relates an episode regarding how she shifted from still life paintings to abstract paintings. On a trip across Europe, she encountered many Morandi paintings for which she had until that point she had felt an affinity towards. But after seeing many Morandi works across various museums across Europe, the works that interested her began to shift towards abstract works, particularly those of Cy Twombly, who she had not encountered, even through art books, until her trip to Europe. She realized what it was about Morandi's works that had attracted her: the pictorial space rather than the still life motifs themselves.

In her process of artistic development, Kodama was heavily influenced by the way that Mark Rothko uses delicate color arrangements to express light in limited pictorial space; the scale and the ease with which Robert Motherwell produces his layered textured works. These were the influenced behind her shift to abstraction which coalesced in her Natura Morta series.

=== Reemergence of figurative ===
In the wake of a skiing injury, Kodama was limited to producing charcoal sketches, unable to use the oil paints that she was accustomed to. These monochrome explorations, in combination with her exposure to abstract expressionism, contributed to her desire to enter her works not only through visual perception but physically. As her works became more abstract, the size of her canvases also increased. But as she explored abstraction, she felt a pulled back towards the representational just as she had been pulled towards the abstract when she worked with the representational.

Kodama has continued to live in Kyoto since she was a university student and as such has had many opportunities to see works from the Maruyama Shijo school. She states that her encounter with Bakusen Tsuchida’s work was influential. While her artistic developments had tended towards the abstract, she felt a strong attraction to Tsuchida’s motif of nature and shifted her style once again to the representational but this time in a nature-oriented direction. Although Kodama states in another interview conducted and recorded in the exhibition catalogue of Primary Field II in 2010 at the Museum of Modern Art, Kamakura & Hayama, that her interest in nature does not directly stem from traditional Japanese depictions of seasons, but that her works often try to capture the different places that her eyes fall upon on the walks she often takes in her neighborhood.

Her various nature motifs have undergone various evolutions but speaking about her works depicting cherry blossom Kodama says that she paints, “not to describe the motif, but to capture the atmosphere.” Yuka Egami, curator at the Hyogo Prefectural Museum of Art, succinctly describes Kodama's arch in her essay introducing the Theatre of Our Lives group exhibition in 2002, “For a time, Kodama Yasue painted highly abstract pictures with brilliant strokes of color across whiteish field, but in recent years, she has again turned to more concrete motifs. Not only are the images concrete, they are familiar objects like flowers, trees and goldfish – things one might normally expect to see in a painting. Though the images are common in our daily lives, they are painted in an airy way over a deep expansive background.”

== Critical reception ==
=== Stylistic shifts ===
In an essay for the exhibition catalogue at Art Site in 1994, Art Critic Yoshinobu Shimasaki establishes that the gradual process of Kodama's shift away from the representational towards more abstract works of forms and colors began in 1988 “the still objects in her paintings began to show a tendency to gradually melt or disappear into the hazy space surrounding them.”

Commenting on Kodama's early forays into abstraction, Shimasaki describes her early abstract monochromatic colored surfaces or forms as “masses” that pursue her “interest in the painting space that originates from still life without borrowing the forms of objects from the world outside the painting.” He says that the lines of Kodama's brushstrokes and the “saturation and brightness” of the carefully selected hues in her earlier works portended her eventual transition towards the abstract.

In her essay regarding Kodama, art critic Chikako Ikegami attributes her shift away from representational still-life towards the abstract as a shift in focus from the objects themselves to the spatial relationship between them. Ikegami explains, “As the forms of the actual objects being painted gradually disappeared, leaving nothing but the sense of space surrounding the objects, the surface of these Morandi style paintings grew infinitely close to nothingness. The artist’s interest gradually shifted away from the attempt to grasp the objects to be painted, and towards the interstices created between the objects. She moved the focus to the background of the still life”.

Shimasaki also addresses this shift from still life to the abstract and say that it may seem to be an “orthodox” transition but art historian Toshio Yamanashi, director of the Museum of Modern Art, Kanagawa at the time, in an essay written for the Primary Field II exhibition in 2010, states that rather than a modernist inclination, Kodama's works show a “sensitivity that is receptive to an intuitive perception of nature that can be seen in the paintings of Hasegawa Tohaku of the Momoyama period, which emerged from the maturation of Machi-shu culture (class of local businessmen), and the Japanese paintings of Chikukyo Ono and Tsuchida Bakusen in the modern era.” Both artists were firmly steeped in the tradition of Nihon-ga during the Taisho period but traveled to Europe together and were heavily influenced by the French Impressionist and Post-Impressionist movements.

=== East West Dichotomy Analysis ===
==== Quintet exhibition ====
Regarding the influence of Kodama's western and eastern influences, Masaru Igarashi, Senior Chief Curator for the Sompo Museum's group exhibition titled Quintet in 2014, succinctly traces the legacy of Western landscape painting. Igarashi traces the arc from J.M.W. Turner to Claude Monet, and the cultural transmission of non-figurative landscapes to Japan during the Meiji Period, a culture in which “Landscape is a familiar subject for the Japanese.” This transmission resulted in “a fading of the presence of art forms such as Chinese ink paintings that influenced the development of Japanese art.”

After establishing the premise of the entangled modern Japanese aesthetic between East and West, Igarashi references the 1978 exhibition Mirrors and Windows: American Photography Since 1960 at the Museum of Modern Art, New York, which established the precedent for dividing art into two board categories as “’windows’ that faithfully represent the external world and ‘mirrors’ that reflect what the photographer has sense or perceived in a more Romantic form of expression.” Igarashi extends this broad categorization to the realm of painting and describes Kodama and the other four artists in the exhibition as “‘mirror’ type artists who perceive scenes or landscapes through the filter of their own sensibilities and perceptions and, with concern for elements such as the season, time, or weather, represent them in views wrapped gently in brilliant moments created ... with the artists perceptions, memories or images intertwined.”

Regarding Kodama’s production method which embodies this ‘mirror’ categorization, he writes “Kodama takes photographs of everyday scenes and then creates painting by using the objective image of the photograph to re-examine the subjective image in her mind.” Although Kodama primarily works with oil paint, a Western painterly medium, Igarashi places Kodama in the entangled historical context of East and West that he premised in his essay, and says that in her works, “there is an underlying reverberation of the Japanese sense of nature.”

==== Monet’s Legacy exhibition ====
Kodama's works were also included in the Monet’s Legacy exhibition at the Yokohama Museum of Art which presented various Claude Monet works and various contemporary artists who can be said to trace his legacy. In her essay explaining Kodama within this context, Kyoko Sakamoto, assistant curator at the museum, explains Kodama's technique of layering colors on her canvases and renders her nature motifs before the paint can dry while recalling her sensation when she first encountered the landscape. Kodama paints these time consuming works in series, often depicting similar scenes in multiple works. Sakamoto says that this technique allows for the landscape to “emerge from the depths of the canvas and incorporate all of Kodama’s senses, not only vision, but also temperature, humidity, even the taste of the air.” Sakamoto relates Kodama's images to sense of “extracting and condensing the landscapes that Monet painted every day in his garden in Giverny. The figurative motifs and the inspiration he gained from them were sublimated into something essential and acquired a vast universality through the process of painting repeatedly.”

==== Deep Rhyme exhibition ====
In an essay for Kodama's exhibition in 2018, art critic Toshiaki Minemura relates to Kodama's oscillation between the representational and the abstract to two concepts: the French concept of obliteration, or a cancelation made over a postal stamp to indicate that it has been used; and the Japanese concept of egaki-keshi or mise-kechi, which Minemura defines as a proofreading method that “rather than blacking out erroneous parts, mise-kechi keeps them visible while crossing them out with one or two lines” and the direction translation is “to draw and erase.” Minemura explains that this “act of half erasing and half keeping a visibility” is best achieved with a paint brush: “A wise brushwork can, without obliterating the whole thing, half erase, leave unpainted areas, or let the preceding layers beneath be seen through the brushstroke” which all depend upon “whether the artist can comprehend the significance of ‘half’ that regulates the subtle conversion of visibility and invisibility, presence and absence.” Minemura argues that Kodama’s explorations between the representational and the abstract and natural motifs can be understood within the context of these concepts.

The Deep Rhyme exhibition, which revisited Kodama's early works, was held at MEM Gallery in Tokyo. A monograph of the same title was published by the gallery with photographs from Kodama's major exhibitions, tracing the artistic development of the artist.

== Selected permanent collections ==
National Museum of Modern Art, Tokyo

Hyogo Prefectural Museum of Art

The Museum of Modern Art, Wakayama

== Selected group exhibitions ==
Light & Shadow: The Sense of Ephemerality, Hiroshima City Museum of Contemporary Art, 1994

The Vision of Contemporary Art 1994, The Ueno Royal Museum, 1994

Allegory of Seeing, 1995: Painting and Sculpture in Contemporary Japan, Sezon Museum of Art Tokyo, 1995

The Vision of Contemporary Art 1996, The Ueno Royal Museum, 1996

The Vision of Contemporary Art 1997, The Ueno Royal Museum, 1997

The Vision of Contemporary Art 1998, The Ueno Royal Museum, 1998

Theatre of our lives, Hyogo Prefectural Museum of Art, 2002

Tsubakikai-ten, Shiseido Gallery, 2002-2005

Dialogues, Painters’ Views on the Museum Collection: Iba Yasuke, Kodama Yasue, Sagaawa Koji, Watanabe Nobuaki, The Museum of Modern Art, Shiga, 2007

LINK - Flexible Deviation, Hyogo Prefectural Museum of Art, 2009

Primary Field II, The Museum of Modern Art, Kamakura & Hayama, 2010

New Incubation 4 Yurameki Tokeyuku: Yasue Kodama & Tetsuji Nakanishi, Kyoto Art Center, 2012

Quintet: Five-Star Artists, Teiji Togo Memorial Sompo Japan Museum of Art, 2014

Monet – 100 Years Since Then, Nagoya City Art Museum/Yokohama Museum of Art, 2018

Observation: Artists Confronting the Wonder of Looking Intently, Gunma Museum of Art, Tatebayashi, 2019

Sorezore no Nagame: Miwa Kawai, Yasue Kodama, Hisako Masuda, Satoko Watanabe, the Tokushima Modern Art Museum, 2020
