= Uncanny =

Psychological experience of something being strangely familiar

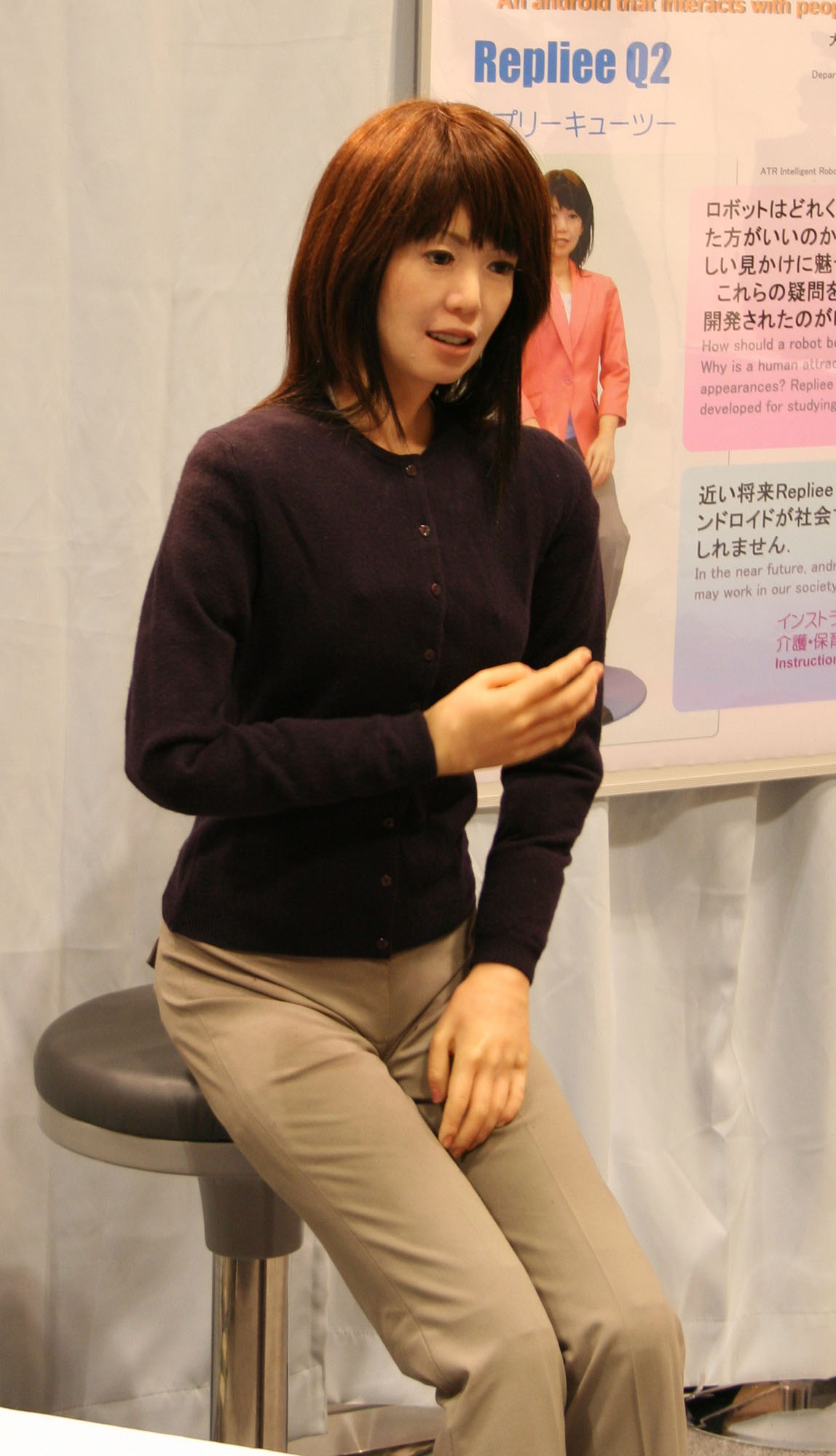
Repliee Q2 is a lifelike robot developed at Osaka University, often named as an example of the uncanny valley due to its similarity to humans, even replicating functions like blinking, breathing and speaking.

The uncanny is the psychological experience of an event or thing that is unsettling in a way that feels oddly familiar, rather than simply mysterious. This phenomenon is used to describe incidents where a familiar entity is encountered in a frightening, eerie, or taboo context.

Ernst Jentsch set out the concept of the uncanny, later elaborated on by Sigmund Freud in his 1919 essay "Das Unheimliche", which explores the eeriness of dolls and waxworks. For Freud, the uncanny is located in the strangeness of the ordinary. Expanding on the idea, psychoanalytic theorist Jacques Lacan wrote that the uncanny places us "in the field where we do not know how to distinguish bad and good, pleasure from displeasure", resulting in an irreducible anxiety that gestures to the Real. The concept has since been taken up by a variety of thinkers and theorists like roboticist Masahiro Mori's uncanny valley and Julia Kristeva's concept of abjection.

== Etymology ==
Canny is from the Anglo-Saxon root ken: "knowledge, understanding, or cognizance; mental perception." The uncanny is thus "an idea beyond one's ken", something outside one's familiar knowledge or perceptions.

Freud noted the German unheimlich as the antonym of heimlich, or the "homely". A more literal rendering of the psychoanalytic concept of the uncanny would therefore be "unhomeliness".

== History ==
=== German idealism ===
Philosopher F. W. J. Schelling raised the question of the uncanny in his late Philosophie der Mythologie of 1837, postulating that the Homeric clarity was built upon a prior repression of the uncanny.

In The Will to Power manuscript, German philosopher Friedrich Nietzsche refers to nihilism as "the uncanniest of all guests" and, earlier, in On the Genealogy of Morals he argues it is the "will to truth" that has destroyed the metaphysics that underpins the values of Western culture. Hence, he coins the phrase "European nihilism" to describe the condition that afflicts those Enlightenment ideals that seemingly hold strong values yet undermine themselves.

=== Ernst Jentsch ===
Uncanniness was first explored psychologically by Ernst Jentsch in a 1906 essay, On the Psychology of the Uncanny. Jentsch defines the Uncanny as: being a product of "...intellectual uncertainty; so that the uncanny would always, as it were, be something one does not know one’s way about in. The better oriented in his environment a person is, the less readily will he get the impression of something uncanny in regard to the objects and events in it." He expands upon its use in fiction:

In telling a story one of the most successful devices for easily creating uncanny effects is to leave the reader in uncertainty whether a particular figure in the story is a human being or an automaton and to do it in such a way that his attention is not focused directly upon his uncertainty, so that he may not be led to go into the matter and clear it up immediately.

Jentsch identifies German writer E. T. A. Hoffmann as a writer who uses uncanny effects in his work, focusing specifically on Hoffmann's story "The Sandman" ("Der Sandmann"), which features a lifelike doll, Olympia.

=== Sigmund Freud ===
The concept of the Uncanny was later elaborated on and developed by Sigmund Freud in his 1919 essay "Das Unheimliche" or, "The Uncanny", which also draws on the work of Hoffmann (whom Freud considers the "unrivaled master of the uncanny in literature"). However, he criticizes Jentsch's belief that Olympia is the central uncanny element in the story ("The Sandman"):

I cannot think – and I hope most readers of the story will agree with me – that the theme of the doll Olympia, who is to all appearances a living being, is by any means the only, or indeed the most important, element that must be held responsible for the quite unparalleled atmosphere of uncanniness evoked by the story.

Instead, Freud draws on a wholly different element of the story, namely, "the idea of being robbed of one's eyes", to be the "more striking instance of uncanniness" in the tale. He focuses on how the anxiety of their loss, is not unlike male castration anxiety. He continues, explaining how this anxiety may lead a male audience, robbed of their masculinity, feeling the uncanny. Their masculinity being robbed, provides Freud the foundation to illustrate a central contributor to male fear.

Freud goes on, for the remainder of the essay, to identify uncanny effects that result from instances of "repetition of the same thing," linking the concept to that of the repetition compulsion. He includes incidents wherein one becomes lost and accidentally retraces one's steps, and instances wherein random numbers recur, seemingly meaningfully (here Freud may be said to be prefiguring the concept that Jung would later refer to as synchronicity). He also discusses the uncanny nature of Otto Rank's concept of the "double".

Freud specifically relates an aspect of the Uncanny derived from German etymology. By contrasting the German adjective unheimlich with its base word heimlich ("concealed, hidden, in secret"), he proposes that social taboo often yields an aura not only of pious reverence but even more so of horror and even disgust, as the taboo state of an item gives rise to the commonplace assumption that that which is hidden from public eye (cf. the eye or sight metaphor) must be a dangerous threat and even an abomination – especially if the concealed item is obviously or presumingly sexual in nature. Basically, the Uncanny is what unconsciously reminds us of our own Id, our forbidden and thus repressed impulses – especially when placed in a context of uncertainty that can remind one of infantile beliefs in the omnipotence of thought. Such uncanny elements are perceived as being threatening by our super-ego ridden with oedipal guilt because it fears symbolic castration by punishment for deviating from societal norms. Thus, the items and individuals that we project our own repressed impulses upon become a most uncanny threat to us, uncanny monsters and freaks akin to fairy-tale folk-devils, and subsequently often become scapegoats we blame for all sorts of perceived miseries, calamities, and maladies.

What interests us most in this long extract is to find that among its different shades of meaning the word heimlich exhibits one which is identical with its opposite, unheimlich. What is heimlich thus comes to be unheimlich. [...] In general we are reminded that the word heimlich is not unambiguous, but belongs to two sets of ideas, which, without being contradictory, are yet very different: on the one hand it means what is familiar and agreeable, and on the other, what is concealed and kept out of sight. Unheimlich is customarily used, we are told, being the contrary only of the first signification of heimlich, and not of the second. [...] On the other hand, we notice that Schelling says something which throws quite a new light on the concept of the Unheimlich, for which we were certainly not prepared. According to him, everything is unheimlich that ought to have remained secret and hidden but has come to light.

[...]

A study of dreams, phantasies and myths has taught us that anxiety about one's eyes, the fear of going blind [forming a central theme in "The Sandman"], is often enough a substitute for the dread of being castrated. The self-blinding of the mythical criminal, Oedipus, was simply a mitigated form of the punishment of castration – the only punishment that was adequate for him by the lex talionis. [...] All further doubts are removed when we learn the details of their 'castration complex' from the analysis of neurotic patients, and realize its immense importance in their mental life.

After Freud, Jacques Lacan, in his 1962–1963 seminar "L'angoisse" ("Anxiety"), used the Unheimlich "via regia" to enter into the territory of Angst. Lacan showed how the same image that seduces the subject, trapping him in the narcissistic impasse, may suddenly, by a contingency, show that it is dependent on something, some hidden object, and so the subject may grasp at the same time that he is not autonomous (5 December 1962).

== Related theories ==
Hypothesized emotional response of human subjects is plotted against anthropomorphism of a robot, following roboticist Masahiro Mori's theory of the uncanny. The uncanny valley is the region of negative emotional response towards robots that seem "almost human". Movement amplifies the emotional response.

This concept is closely related to Julia Kristeva's concept of abjection, where one reacts adversely to something forcefully cast out of the symbolic order. Abjection can be uncanny in that the observer can recognize something within the abject, possibly of what it was before it was 'cast out', yet be repulsed by what it is that caused it to be cast out to begin with. Kristeva lays special emphasis on the uncanny return of the past abject with relation to the 'uncanny stranger'.

Sadeq Rahimi has noted a common relationship between the uncanny and direct or metaphorical visual references, which he explains in terms of basic processes of ego development, specifically as developed by Lacan's theory of the mirror stage. Rahimi presents a wide range of evidence from various contexts to demonstrate how uncanny experiences are typically associated with themes and metaphors of vision, blindness, mirrors and other optical tropes. He also presents historical evidence showing strong presence of ocular and specular themes and associations in the literary and psychological tradition out of which the notion of 'the uncanny' emerged. According to Rahimi, instances of the uncanny like doppelgängers, ghosts, déjà vu, alter egos, self-alienations and split personhoods, phantoms, twins, living dolls, etc. share two important features: that they are closely tied with visual tropes, and that they are variations on the theme of doubling of the ego.

Roboticist Masahiro Mori's essay on human reactions to humanlike entities, Bukimi no Tani Genshō (Valley of Eeriness Phenomenon), describes the gap between familiar living people and their also familiar inanimate representations, such as dolls, puppets, mannequins, prosthetic hands, and android robots. The entities in the valley are between these two poles of common phenomena. Mori has stated that he made the observation independently of Jentsch and Freud, though a link was forged by Reichardt and translators who rendered bukimi as uncanny.

== See also ==
- Creepiness
- Evil eye
- Liminality
- Simulacrum
- Liminal space
