= Yasumasa Morimura =

Japanese artist

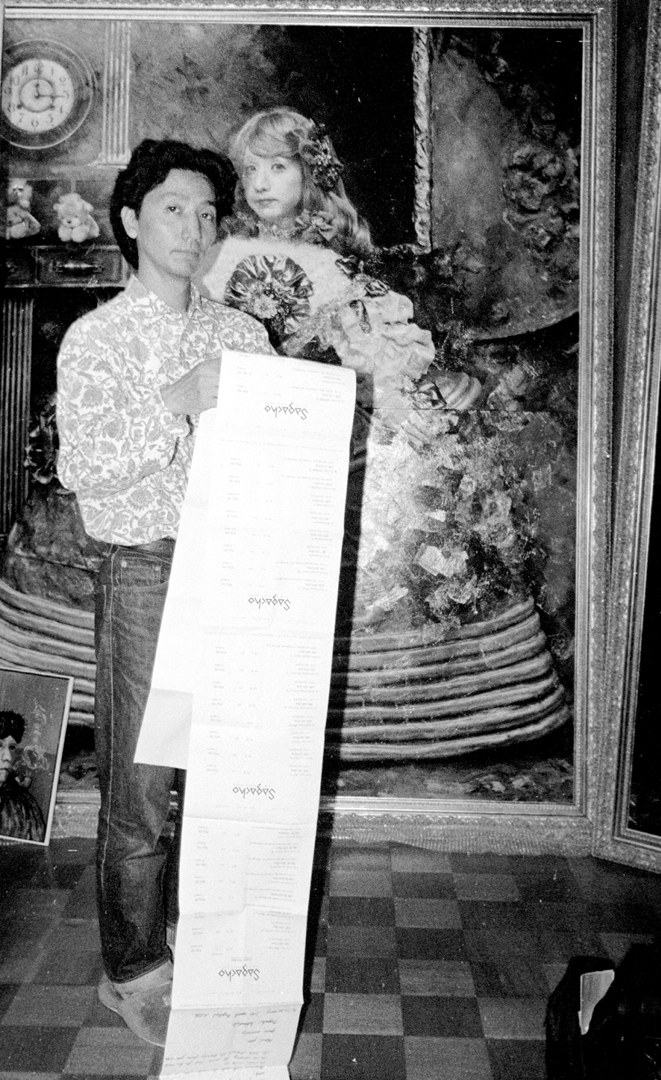
- Yasumasa Morimura in his Osaka studio 1990; photograph by Sally Larsen.
- Born: June 11, 1951 (age 75); Osaka, Japan
- Education: Bachelor of Fine Arts (1978)
- Alma mater: Kyoto City University of Arts
- Known for: Performance and appropriation art
- Movement: Contemporary art
- Spouse: Toshimi Takahara

An Inner Dialogue with Frida Kahlo (Skull Ring), photograph by Yasumasa Morimura

Yasumasa Morimura (森村 泰昌, Morimura Yasumasa, born June 11, 1951) is a contemporary Japanese performance and appropriation artist whose work encompasses photography, film, and live performance. He is known for his reinterpretation of recognizable artworks and figures from art history, history, and mass media through his adoption of personas that transcend national, ethnic, gendered, and racial boundaries. Across his photographic and performative series, Morimura's works explore a number of interconnected themes, including: the nature of identity and its ability to undergo change, postcolonialism, authorship, and the Western view of Japan – and Asia, more broadly – as feminine.

Originally intent on channeling his creative energy into black-and-white still life photography, Morimura struggled to ascertain his identity and decided to visualize this inner struggle through self-portraiture. In 1985, Portrait (Van Gogh), marked the first of dozens of self-portraits Morimura completed in which he adopted the role of established artists, major historical figures, celebrated popular culture icons, and identifiable subjects from well-known artworks.

Since the 1980s, Morimura's artistic process entails a rigorous system in which he transforms his entire body into a nearly identical replica of his designated subject through elaborate costumes, makeup, props, and set designs. Once digital photography and computer editing software became more accessible and refined in the late-1990s, Morimura's works demonstrate greater visual complexity in his manipulation of composition, lighting, and the number of figures he portrays within a single artwork.

For the last two and a half decades, Morimura has brought his personas to life in short video, film, and live performances in which he expresses their thoughts through movement and scripted monologues.

== Early life and education (1951–1978) ==
Yasumasa Morimura was born in Osaka, Japan in 1951 to father Nobuo (died in 2006) and mother Hiroko (died in 2016).

Following the end of the American Occupation of Japan in 1952, Morimura grew up in a generation that embraced Western values and cultural trends that came to define Japan's Post-World War II period. His continual exposure to Western, particularly American, socio-cultural customs in music, film, and fashion would later influence his artistic pursuits in the 1980s.

In the mid-1970s, Morimura enrolled in the Kyoto City University of Art, where he received his Bachelor of Fine Arts in 1978. During his studies, an early interest in photography emerged after he took a course taught by Life magazine photographer Y. Ernest Satow (1927–1990). Satow lectured on the Modern Western aesthetic ideals of photography and camera techniques, particularly as it was exemplified in the works of the French Humanist photographer Henri-Cartier Bresson.

== Early career (1978–1988) ==
Following graduation, Satow hired Morimura to work as a photography assistant. Through this employment experience, Morimura produced his first artworks which were black-and-white still life images mainly shot indoors. These encompassed his Barco negro na mesa series from the early-1980s. However, he incorporated an additional layer of creativity through his photographs of sculptural assemblages he designed from found objects.

One of these works, Tabletop City (Arch of Triumph) (1984), is a vertical photographic composition in which a fork occupies the center plane as it leans against a conical glass with a light bulb inside of it. Morimura's careful arrangement of found objects grew more complex as seen in a photograph he took of a tall, slender tower made from dice, cut out letters, and a painted board.

In 1985, Morimura shifted his attention to self-portraiture after he contemplated the precise nature of his Asian identity. Reflecting on the motivations behind this thematic approach, Morimura recalled the questions he raised at this moment: “Who am I? My face is Asian, but I am increasingly living in a western style? Can I say I am Japanese?”.

In tandem with these pressing questions, Morimura's understanding of Modern Japanese history was equally influential on the change in his creative focus. He has regularly cited the evolving lifestyle of the Meiji Emperor Mutsuhito in which he was raised to act feminine during the Shogunate's rule but later adopted a more militaristic image and masculine personality once he ascended to the imperial throne. Morimura noted that the Emperor's sudden change in appearance signified that this is an example of how easily one can transform their identity instantaneously through different apparel. From here, Morimura began to question if a change in clothing could truly make a person feel like someone completely different.

Morimura created his first self-portraits in which he portrayed the Impressionist painter Vincent van Gogh and his sitter Camille Roulin in 1985. These photorealistic engagements with van Gogh's paintings marked the first instance of Morimura challenging the malleability of identity formation. Subsequently, Morimura participated with fellow artists Tomoaki Ishihara and Hiroshi Kimura in a three-person group exhibition at Kyoto's Galerie 16 in 1985, Smile with Radical Will, where he first exhibited his van Gogh and Roulin self-portraits.

A watershed moment in Morimura's career occurred in 1988 when he created Portrait (Futago), a modern recreation of Édouard Manet's controversial 1863 painting Olympia. Morimura positions himself in the roles of both the reclining white Olympia figure and her black maidservant and he replaces part of the surroundings with distinctly Japanese attributes as seen in the golden crane bed linens and the maneki-neko (“beckoning cat” figure said to symbolize good luck). Morimura supplanting both the white and black female subjects with his male Asian body was significant for its subversion of a work considered a staple of the Western Art History canon. The photograph addresses the issues of the male gaze and objectification of the female body, and it simultaneously brings to light the ignorance toward nonwhite subjects in Art History. By occupying the roles of the two sole figures, Morimura renders himself unavoidable for viewers to observe.

Morimura's art attracted global attention after he was invited to exhibit his self-portraits for Japan at the 43rd Venice Biennale in their Aperto section. The opportunity to participate in this prestigious international art fair rapidly catapulted Morimura's status to world art icon that soon led to his participation in dozens of group and solo exhibitions throughout Asia, North America, Europe, and Australia at the end of the 1980s and throughout the 1990s.

== Career success and development (1988–2000) ==
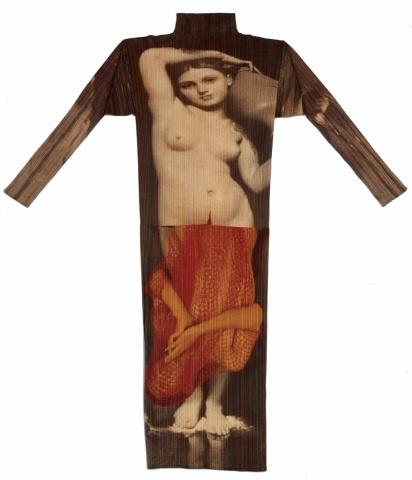
Yasumasa Morimura for Issey Miyake, printed polyester, 1996-97 (RISD Museum)

Although the 1988 Venice Biennale was responsible for officially launching Morimura's career on an international scale, his 1990 solo exhibition Daughter of Art History at the Sagacho Exhibit Space in Tokyo led to his popularity within the Japanese art world. The exhibition's theme centered on Morimura's critique of the Art History canon in which he deconstructed Western notions of aesthetic beauty, and examined Japan's longstanding interest in Western culture. The success of Daughter of Art History was later revived in future exhibitions, most notably in 1999 at Luhring Augustine Gallery in New York.

Japanese Art After 1945: Scream Against the Sky was a traveling exhibition held at the Guggenheim, Yokohama Museum of Art, and San Francisco Museum of Modern Art from 1994 to 1995. As the first historical survey of post-1945 avant-garde Japanese art, Morimura's selection as a participant in this landmark exhibition attracted positive attention from arts & culture publications. The New York Times art critic Holland Cotter lauded Morimura as a “star” and New York magazine's Mark Stevens highlighted his ability to effectively cross-fertilize “language, image, culture, and object” in his Playing with Gods (Night) (1991).

From 1994 to 1996, Morimura produced his Actress series in which he portrays mid-20th Century American and European actresses and film characters situated in Japanese locales. In Self-Portrait – Actress After Jodie Foster 2 (1996), Morimura fashions himself after Jodie Foster's prostitute character from Taxi Driver (1976) while seated on a red stool in an urban Tokyo alleyway littered with packets of cigarettes.

However, Morimura did not only restrict his Actress subjects to still photography as he breathed life into his roles through both live performance and a short film.

In 1995, Morimura had a video recorded in which the camera shows the massive Yasuda Auditorium classroom at Tokyo University's Komaba campus as students sit at their desks and prepare for their professor's lecture. Unbeknownst to them, Morimura arrives dressed as Marilyn Monroe (who he refers to as “Actress M”) and proceeds to run around shouting and gesticulating before standing atop a desk at the front of the room. Morimura strikes a pose that mimics Monroe's famous performance in The Seven Year Itch (1955). Although he was in character as a white, female American actress, the performance was both a reference to and an indirect recreation of the right-wing writer Yukio Mishima's infamous debate with the left-wing student group Zenkyōtō that occurred in the same auditorium on May 13, 1969. While Morimura admitted he did not research the event in great detail, he has continually referenced how Mishima's theatrically expressive opposition to the “cultural castration” and consumerism of Japan moved him to consider the importance of art's authenticity in a Japanese context. As a commentary on Mishima's vehement opposition to the perceived feminization of Japan in the post-World War II era, Morimura decided to reinterpret the event from the polar opposite standpoint of a recognizably female subject and symbol of popular media consumption, Marilyn Monroe.

In preparation for the Yokohama Museum of Art's exhibition The Sickness Unto Beauty – Self-portrait as Actress (April 1996 – June 1996), Morimura was commissioned to appear in a short film as part of the show's focus on his recent Actress series. The experimental filmmaker Takashi Itoh directed Apparatus M (1996) that features Morimura as Marilyn Monroe. The film was screened in a classic-style theater venue contained within the museum's exhibition space to evoke the connections between Monroe and the filmgoing culture of the Golden Age of Hollywood.

For Fall-Winter 1996–7, the Japanese fashion designer Issey Miyake invited Morimura to create a design to be printed on garments from Miyake's first "Guest Artists" collaboration. Miyake's manifesto was to produce clothing offering an “interactive relationship between art and the person who admires it,” and Morimura provided Miyake with collages reproducing Ingres's 1856 nude painting La Source, and self-portraits showing himself inverted and draped in red tulle. Another design showed the nude Morimura emerging from behind a life-sized cutout of La Source.

== Career (2000–present) ==
Starting in the late-1990s, advancements in digital camera and computer technology permitted Morimura a broader range of creative tools to visually manipulate and alter his portrait compositions and subjects’ appearances such as Photoshop.

There are multiple examples of works in which Morimura inserted his countenance onto non-human subjects. Singing Sunflowers (1998) is a color photograph print based on Vincent van Gogh's still life Sunflowers (1888) in that it retains the exact same floral arrangement, color palette, and interior space from the original painting. However, Morimura digitally replicates his face to appear on each of the sunflowers’ heads at different angles.

In tandem with his art, Morimura was appointed as a professor at Kyoto University of Art and Design's International Research Center for the Arts from 2004 to 2006. Alongside the artists Hiroshi Senju and Tatsuo Miyajima, he was selected as an artist-in-residence in which he was tasked with educating University-level visual arts fellows. The intent of the program was to foster a new generation of artistic production in Kyoto that could be shared with the rest of the world.

Morimura's Requiem series (2006) denoted a significant shift in the content of his self-portraits. With an embedded interest in Modern Japanese and world history, Morimura was attracted to specific historical figures and how their power and influence shaped their national surroundings. This marked a brief departure from Morimura's typically female and Art History-rooted subjects in that he chose to portray masculine figures: Japanese right-wing writer and political agitator Yukio Mishima, actor Charlie Chaplin as a parodic Adolf Hitler from The Great Dictator (1940), Argentine revolutionary Che Guevara, and Chinese Communist leader Mao Zedong.

In December 2012, a formal announcement revealed that Morimura was selected as the artistic director of the 2014 installment of the Yokohama Triennale art festival.

Morimura debuted his first feature-length film, Ego Symposium, in 2016. Returning to the Art History-laden content of his work from the 1980s to the 2000s, Morimura embodies the roles of eleven distinguished artists from the Art History canon: Andy Warhol, Frida Kahlo, Vincent van Gogh, Johannes Vermeer, Diego Velazquez, Jan van Eyck, Leonardo da Vinci, Albrecht Durer, Michelangelo Merisi da Caravaggio, Rembrandt van Rijn, and Louise Vigee Le Brun. This moving image work consists of vignettes in which each of the artists deliver a dramatic monologue on the nature of selfhood, identity, and how it relates to their artistry. As a humorous statement on self, Morimura expresses in the opening that Marcel Duchamp will be referenced but that “... because Mr. Duchamp is of the opinion that absence is a testament to existence, he will not be joining us today”; in his place, Morimura inserts himself as both a character and the moderator of the meeting between the eleven artists.

Similar to Ego Symposium’s filmic format, Nippon Cha Cha Cha! (2018) is a multimedia work that combines film and live theatrical performance. Morimura portrays a diverse set of characters in an assessment of how Japan’s identity is shaped by American culture following the end of the Allied occupation in 1952. As Showa Emperor Hirohito, General Douglas MacArthur, actress Marilyn Monroe, and writer Yukio Mishima, the work is a blend of historical and autobiographical references. During one of the film’s scenes, Morimura recreates the historic photograph of the meeting between Emperor Hirohito and General MacArthur but switches the original location from the American ambassador’s residence to his childhood home and parents’ tea shop. These scenes were intended to signify Morimura's understanding of the complex relationship between America's influence on Japanese culture and how it led to his internal conflict as to what it means to identify as “Japanese” in the 20th and 21st Centuries. During the live performance component, Morimura enters the stage wearing the same military uniform as Mishima and is armed with a scroll. Before the audience, Morimura reads a declaration that argues for the essentiality of art as a reference to the politically charged speech Mishima delivered on fascism at Tokyo's Ground Self-Defense Force camp before he committed ritualistic suicide on November 25, 1970.

Although Morimura's art has been the subject of dozens of group and solo exhibitions around the world since his public debut in the 1980s, the 2018 retrospective of his career at The Japan Society, Yasumasa Morimura: Ego Obscura (October 2018 – January 2019), was his first institutional solo exhibition in New York and was met with all-around praise by art critics and publications, from The New York Times and The Brooklyn Rail, to Hyperallergic and The Eye of Photography.

== Personal life ==
Morimura presently lives and works in his native Osaka, and he is married to Toshimi Takahara.

== Style, content, and themes ==
=== Style and content ===
As both a performance and appropriation artist, Morimura's art is defined by his assumption of the identities of famous artists, artwork subjects, historical figures, and popular culture icons. In order to evoke the identity of his respective roles, Morimura recreates these images through extensive makeup and props before situating them in settings with which they would be associated or locations that are completely foreign to their identity. In Vermeer Study: A Great Story out of the Corner of a Small Room (2004), the content is a faithful reproduction of the interior space and figures from Dutch Baroque painter Johannes Vermeer's The Art of Painting (1666–1668).

When he recreates subjects from paintings, Morimura replicates the precise surface details and brushstroke textures inherent in the original works. Based on Post-Impressionist Vincent van Gogh's renowned Self-portrait (1889), Morimura's face is covered in splotches and remnants of golden yellow paint while his clothing contains mixtures of green and blue paint that complements the swirling blue-green curved forms behind him; this photographic staging echoes van Gogh's painterly impasto technique.

Often, art historians and critics have described his self-portraits as a form of parody. The photograph Self-Portrait: White Marilyn 2 (1996) is regularly cited as an example of this characterization as Morimura wears a blonde wig and white dress that is visually reminiscent of Marilyn Monroe's hairstyle and wardrobe while he reenacts her famous scene from The Seven Year Itch (1955) when her character embarrassingly attempts to hold down her dress as it blows above her knees.

=== Themes ===
Identity exploration is the main, overarching theme that predominates the scope of Morimura's art, and it encompasses an analysis of multiple identities that often intersect within works: ethnicity, nationality, gender & sexuality, race, etc. In his Actress series (1994 – 1996), Morimura depicted himself as a number of American and European actresses: Audrey Hepburn, Marlene Dietrich, Jodie Foster, Brigitte Bardot, Marilyn Monroe, et al. This series challenged the notions of the male gaze as Morimura purposefully inserts his male Japanese identity into photographic recreations of world famous white, female cinema icons.

Through his continual engagement with the Art History canon, postcolonialism and the feminization of Asia are recurring themes that have persisted. The association of Japan and Asia as a feminized space was a 19th Century Euro-American perception that utilized gendered binaries to explain the differences between Western and Eastern cultures: Western civilization demonstrated masculine dominance for its massive military industrial complex and imperialist ambitions, whereas Asia was deemed powerless, poor, and weak, but viewed positively as exotic for its indigenous art, decoration, and fashion. Completed thirty years apart, Morimura's two versions of Edouard Manet's Olympia (1863) both examine the legacies of postcolonialism and the historic view of Asia-as-female. Portrait (Futago) (1988) degrades the Western male gaze through the portrayal of the white reclining Olympia and her black maidservant with that of a male Japanese figure in their positions. Une Moderne Olympia (2018) further pushes the boundaries on Morimura's first redesign of the Manet painting in which he now transforms Olympia into a Japanese woman with the accoutrements of a geisha, a historic Western stereotype and mythologizing signifier of Japanese womanhood. The black maidservant is replaced with a European man donning an elegant black top hat and matching gloves as he presents the geisha with a bouquet of flowers. The encroaching male behind the geisha interrogates the violent implications of the male gaze as both a literal objectification of women and a figurative raping of Japanese culture.

== Filmography ==
- 1996: Apparatus M
- 2016: Ego Symposium

== Collections ==
Select Museums, Galleries, and Arts & Culture Institutions

Carnegie Museum of Art, Pittsburgh; Honolulu Museum of Art, Honolulu; International Center of Photography, Chicago; J. Paul Getty Museum, Los Angeles; Museum of Contemporary Art, Chicago; Museum of Contemporary Art, Los Angeles; San Francisco Museum of Modern Art, San Francisco; Whitney Museum of American Art, New York; Art Gallery of New South Wales, Sydney; Denver Art Museum, Denver; Hara Museum of Contemporary Art, Tokyo; Hirshhorn Museum and Sculpture Garden, Washington, D.C.; Institute of Contemporary Art, Boston; Israel Museum, Jerusalem; Los Angeles County Museum of Art, Los Angeles; Museo Nacional de Arte Reina Sofía, Madrid; Museum of Modern Art, New York; Museum of Fine Arts, Boston; National Museum of Modern Art, Osaka; Philadelphia Museum of Art, Philadelphia; Queensland Art Gallery, Queensland; UBS Art Collection, Zurich.

== Awards ==
Awards

- 2011: The Order of the Purple Ribbon
- 2011: Photographic Society of Japan Award
- 2011: 24th Kyoto Artistic Culture Prize
- 2016: Osaka Culture Prize

Nominations

- 1996: Nominated for the Hugo Boss Prize
- 2006: Nominated for the Kyoto Cultural Merit Award
- 2007: Nominated for the Minister of Education for Fine Arts
- 2011: Nominated for the 52nd Mainichi Art Award

Honorary titles

- 2004–2006: Artist-in-Residence Fellow, International Research Center for the Arts, Kyoto, Japan
- 2013: Selected as Person of Cultural Merit in Kyoto City
- 2014: Artistic director of the Yokohama Triennale, Yokohama, Japan

== Publications ==
- 1996: The Sickness Unto Beauty: Self-Portrait as Actress
- 1998: Morimura Yasumasa: Self-Portrait as Art History
- 2003: Daughter of Art History: Photographs by Yasumasa Morimura
- 2007: On Self-Portrait: Through the Looking-Glass
