= Kyoto City University of Arts =

Art school in Kyoto, Japan

Coordinates: 34°58′28″N 135°39′50″E

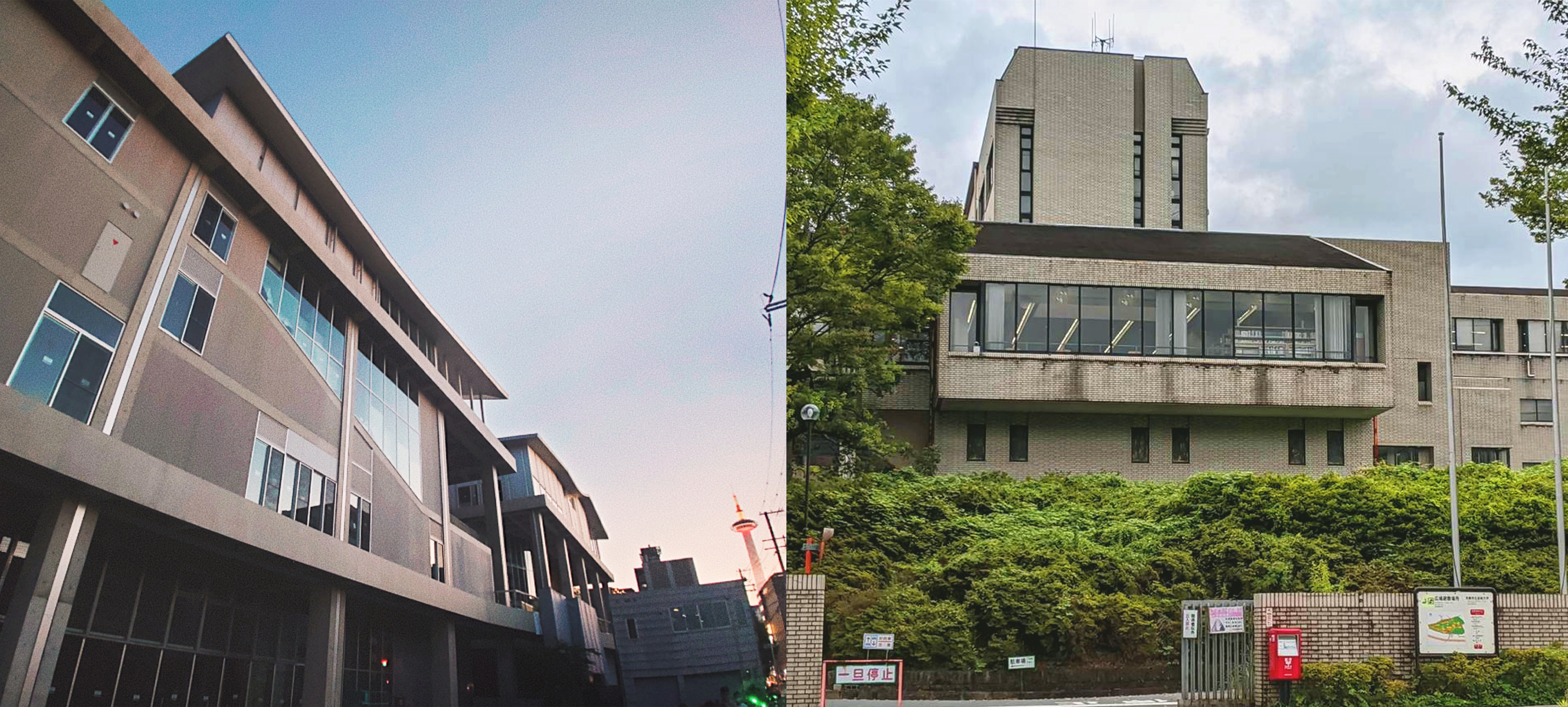
- Sūjin Campus(Left，2023) And Nishikyo-Kutsukake Campus（Right）
- Other names: Kyōtogeidai, kyōgei, KCUA
- Type: Public
- Established: 1880
- Chancellor: Tamame Akamatsu
- Location: Kyoto, Japan
- Campus: 57-1 Shimono-cho, Shimogyo-ku, Kyoto 600-8206
- Website: www.kcua.ac.jp/en/

Map

Kyoto City University of Arts (京都市立芸術大学, Kyōtogeidai. Official abbreviated name: Kyōgei) (京都芸大/Kyoto Univ. of Arts) is a public, municipal university of general art and music in Kyoto, Japan. Established in 1880, it is Japan's oldest university of the arts (the predecessor of Tokyo University of the Arts was founded in 1887). Among its faculty and graduates have been 16 recipients of the Order of Culture, 24 members of the Japan Art Academy, and 10 artists who have been designated Living National Treasures. The university has been associated closely with nihonga painters from western Japan.

== History ==
The university was founded in 1880 as the Kyoto Prefectural School of Painting (京都府画学校, Kyōtofu Gagakkō) in temporary quarters in the grounds of the imperial palace in Kyoto. Kyoto had lost its status as the nation's capital in 1867, at the beginning of Meiji Period, and the city was in danger of being left behind in the wave of modernization overtaking the country. In 1878, a group of painters petitioned the city government to establish a modern school of the arts to support the traditional arts and crafts, including painting, ceramics, and weaving. The school was founded with support from the city and national government leader Sanjo Sanetomi, and contributions from 93 Kyoto merchants.

The Faculty of Fine Arts originated from the Kyoto Prefectural School of Painting, founded in 1880, which was named "Japan's First Kyoto School of Painting" by Grand Minister Sanjo Sanetomi in June, and the opening ceremony was held in July at the former temporary building of the Jugōsato Goten Palace in the Kyoto Imperial Garden. The background to this event was that the Maruyama School, the Shijo School, and other schools of Kyoto art were in crisis due to the loss of patrons after the transfer of the capital to Tokyo, and the cold reception of traditional culture by the opening of civilization. In order to rebuild the art world, the citizens of Kyoto began to call for the establishment of a modern art academy to train artists; this school was founded as a result of their enthusiasm. The school was also intended to support the modernization of traditional applied arts, Kyoto's main industry, which had been stagnant since the advent of civilization, and to promote the art world, which was closely related to it.

At the time, the environment surrounding the art world in Kyoto was severe. In 1864, the city was engulfed in warfare triggered by the urban warfare between the Shogunate and the Chōshū Domain (the Forbidden Gate Incident), and about 27,000 houses were burned down. Due to the political turmoil, the shogunate ceased to exist without any progress in reconstruction. With the inauguration of the new Meiji government, the capital was moved to Tokyo, and the population of the Kyoto area is said to have plummeted from 350,000 to 200,000. In addition to the painters who worked for the imperial court, noble families, and other influential people, Kyoto also had a large number of town painters, but due to the decline in population and the economic slump, there were no more buyers for their paintings. It is said that some painters earned daily wages by drawing dyeing designs and surveying plans. The fate of not only Kyoto but the entire Japanese art world depended on the establishment of the art school.

The people who worked hard to establish the school were painters who lived in the city. In 1878, the proposal to the prefectural governor to establish the school included the names of Umemine Yukino, who led the Shijo School, the mainstream of the Kyoto art world, and Kubota Bakusen of the Suzuki School. Tanomura Naoiri, who became the first headmaster of the school, was a major figure in the Nanga world, but he raised funds by visiting influential people in various places.

Coincidental encounters overlapped with cooperation that transcended schools. The year after the school was established, Kitagaki Kunimichi became governor of the prefectural government and supported the school with funds and other support. At the end of the Tokugawa Shogunate, Kitagaki was mistaken for a spy and almost executed, but his life was saved by the intervention of Mori Kansai, a painter of the Mori School, and it is believed that he was acquainted with the painters.

It is said that he was acquainted with the painters. In order to support the arts, the "power" of the city based on its economic power was essential, so Kitagaki's presence was significant in this sense as well. As Kyoto achieved reconstruction through business, the presence of the school increased as the industrial world demanded talented people who could produce high quality crafts, and the school sent talented people to the art world.

At the school, students were required to study various schools of Japanese art such as Bunjin-ga, yamato-e, and Kanō during their three years of study. One of the objectives of the school was to educate students in the design of crafts for the purpose of promoting the development of new industries, and the introduction of Western painting into the curriculum was revolutionary at the time. The introduction of Western painting into the course was a breakthrough at the time, as Western painting was initially introduced in Japan at the Industrial Art School in 1876, prior to the founding of the Kyoto Prefectural Art School, as an industrial technique for drawing architectural plans, rather than as a form of art and culture. This is in contrast to the Koubu Art School, where the development of Western art study and research was blocked by Ernest Fenollosa and others, and the later Tokyo Art School, which did not have a Western painting department for some time due to the wishes of Fenollosa and Okakura Tenshin.

It is said to have been the center of the Kyoto art world in the old days, and it also supplied many human resources to the local industries of Kyoto, such as ceramics, lacquerware, and dyeing and weaving. Since the Meiji era (1868-1912), the Kyoto National University has trained many Japanese-style painters, Western-style painters, printmakers, potters, weavers, designers, musicians, and contemporary artists. In the past, there was talk of transferring the school to a national university due to the financial difficulties of Kyoto City, but in order to save the school, which is the result of the aspirations of the citizens of Kyoto, many donations were received from the townspeople and old families, and the school continues to be a city university even after being merged with a music junior college.

In 1969, the university merged with a Kyoto college that became its Faculty of Music. The largest and most diverse faculty is Faculty of Fine Arts, which offers courses in traditional and modern fine arts and traditional crafts such as the ceramics, urushi lacquering, and dyeing and weaving. As of 1999, the university had 307 full- and part-time faculty members and 902 students.

The University has produced many artists and educators, and its thorough, small-group education has nurtured many artists in the past. Some of our graduates include contemporary artist Yayoi Kusama, Shoen Uemura, the first woman to be awarded the Order of Cultural Merit, Yutaka Sado, Principal, Conductor of the Vienna Tonkünstler Orchestra, Emi Wada, the first Japanese woman to win an Academy Award for Best Costume Design, Etsuro Sotoo, chief sculptor of the Sagrada Familia, Akira Murayama, a living national treasure of woodwork, and Mr. Kunihiko Moriguchi, a living national treasure in Yuzen, an important intangible cultural property.

Many students are employed by technology companies, and the number of students employed by Nintendo and SONY is the highest among Japanese art universities. Students employed by game companies include not only game character designers, but also Yosuke Fujino, who is involved in UI/UX design for Nintendo's mainstay online services, such as the Nintendo eShop and Nintendo Switch Online.

In 1980, the Faculty of Fine Arts, located in Imakumano, Higashiyama-ku, and the Faculty of Music, located in Shogoin, Sakyo-ku, were integrated and relocated to Ooe-kutsukake-cho, Nishikyo-ku, near Rakusai New Town. In March 2013, the university submitted a proposal to the city government to relocate to the former Sūjin Elementary School site (about 1 hectare) just east of JR Kyoto Station. In March 2013, the university submitted a request to the city government to relocate the university to an area centered on the former Sūjin Elementary School site (approximately 1 hectare) just east of JR Kyoto Station and to secure a total of 4 hectares of land. The new building opened for use in April 2023.

== Faculties ==
- Faculty of Fine Arts
  - Fine Art
  - Design
  - Craft
  - General Science of Art
- Faculty of Music
  - Composition
  - Conducting
  - Piano
  - String Instruments
  - Wind and Percussion Instruments
  - Vocal Music
  - Musicology

== Notable alumni and alumna ==
Nihonga painters

- Fuku Akino
- Shoen Uemura
- Takeuchi Seiho
- Tsuchida Bakusen
- Insho Domoto

Contemporary art

- Teiji Furuhashi (co-founder of dumb type)
- Yuko Takada Keller
- Yayoi Kusama
- Yasumasa Morimura
- Etsuro Sotoo
- Shiro Takatani (co-founder of dumb type)
- Akira the Hustler
- Ayano Sudo
- Yasue Kodama
- Natsuko Tanihara

Music

- Yutaka Sado: Conductor
- Midori Suzuki (soprano)

== Notable faculty ==
- Jōsaku Maeda – painter and printmaker, professor (1979–1983)
