= Ernst Jentsch =

German psychiatrist

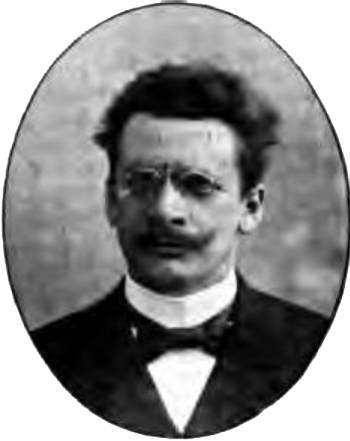
Jentsch in 1908

Ernst Anton Jentsch (1867-1919) born on February 23, 1867, in Breslau, the son of a brewery owner, was a German psychiatrist. He authored works on psychology and pathology and is best known for his essay On the Psychology of the Uncanny (1906). However, he also authored texts on mood and the psychology of music. He is remembered for his influence on psychoanalyst Sigmund Freud who mentions the work of Jentsch in his essay "The Uncanny". Jentsch's work was also a great influence on the theory of the uncanny valley.

He died in 1919.

== Works ==
- Musik und Nerven (2 volumes), 1904-1911
- Zur Psychologie des Unheimlichen, 1906
- Die Laune, 1912
- Das pathologische bei Otto Ludwig, 1913

== Translations ==
- Studies of psychology of sex, by Havelock Ellis
  - translated as Die krankhaften Geschlechtsempfindungen auf dissoziativer Grundlage, 1907
- Studien über Genie und Entartung, 1910, Original by Cesare Lombroso
