= Babiniku =

Japanese term for male VTubers with female avatars

Babiniku (Japanese: バ美肉) is a Japanese term for an online avatar depicting an anime-style female character used by content creators who are often male, though some female content creators also refer to themselves as babiniku. The term is an abbreviation of "virtual bishoujo juniku" (バーチャル美少女受肉; meaning "virtual girl incarnation") or "virtual bishoujo self juniku" (バーチャル美少女セルフ受肉; meaning "virtual girl self-incarnation").

Babiniku may be using an avatar of a cute girl, acting as a virtual girl in a virtual space such as VRChat, or acting as a virtual YouTuber or virtual idol. They may modify their voice into a girl's voice by using a voice changer, or they may simply use their natural voice along with the female 3D model, Live2D model, or static picture. If an adult male uses these sorts of female avatars, he may be called a "Babiniku Oji-san" (バ美肉おじさん; "virtual girl incarnated guy"). (Note: The Japanese word "ojisan" has several meanings and can mean not only uncle (叔父さん, 伯父さん), but also simply an adult male (小父さん).)

== Origin ==
In the Japanese virtual YouTuber (VTuber) community, the performer is called the soul (Japanese: 魂, Hepburn: tamashii) , the character's model or avatar is called the body (Japanese: 肉体, Hepburn: nikutai), and the act of acquiring the model is called incarnation (Japanese: 受肉, Hepburn: juniku). The word "incarnation" originated from what Nijisanji VTuber Tsukino Mito said about getting a 3D model of herself.

The "soul" and the "body" is generally the same in the virtual YouTuber community, but the VTuber known as "Virtual noja-loli kitsune musume YouTuber Oji-san" (Japanese: バーチャルのじゃロリ狐娘Youtuberおじさん, "virtual noja (Note: "Noja" is a way of ending sentences in Japanese stereotypically used by older speakers, thus used to refer to old people. Noja-loli means loli-hag.)-lolita fox girl YouTuber guy", abbreviation: Noja-oji) became popular at the end of 2017, and she is a male using a female nikutai. She announced she was a male using a female avatar, showing he could become a cute girl character even if he was a man and his voice was still his natural male voice. Many VTubers and Babiniku VTubers became active after seeing her videos. Her work resulted in an acceptance from viewers, as they didn't care if there was a man behind a character so long as the character itself was cute.

For some, babiniku is not just about seeing a cute character, but also about finding entertainment in the mismatch between the soul (performer) and the gender presented, which can be considered part of the VTuber's content. One difference between a normal VTubers and a babiniku VTuber is that many babiniku VTubers acknowledge the existence of the person behind the character. The difference between a nekama and a babiniku is that a babiniku often acknowledges the gender difference between the user and how they present themselves.

The popularity of taking on female avatars declined after Noja-oji's appearance on the scene, excluding the work by some such as ARu-ko (ARu子). At the end of May 2018, however, cartoonist Rimukoro (リムコロ) and illustrator Maki-hitsuji (巻羊) introduced a method of animating illustrations during live streams by using software called FaceRig and Live2D. This quickly became popular among illustrators. Many VTubers were originally illustrators, which helped the development of a community of those VTubers who made it publicly known that their "soul" was male. In June 2018, there was a live stream titled "Virtual Bishoujo Self Juniku Oji-san Joshi-kai One Night Jinrou" (Japanese: バーチャル美少女セルフ受肉おじさん女子会ワンナイト人狼, "Virtual-Girl-Self-Incarnation-Guys Girls' Party, playing One Night Werewolf"), and this title was the source of the term babiniku. One of the participants in the live stream was Ma-oh Magurona (魔王マグロナ; "Magurona the Demon King"), who is considered one of the leading babiniku VTubers due to the high number of her subscribers as well as her cuteness.

== "Hell" ==
Japanese: おじさんが自分で絵を書いて自分で動かしたLive2Dの体に受肉して、更に自分でボイスチェンジャーを使って声帯を弄って、自分で声を当てた地獄のようなコンテンツです。
English: This is a content like a "hell", guys incarnated himself into a Live 2-D body that he drew and moved by himself, and also handle his "vocal chords" by himself using a voice changer, and applied the voice for the body by himself.

— Magurona in his YouTube

"Hellish" is a word often used to indirectly describe babiniku. Rimukoro, Maki-hitsuji, Magurona, and Natori Sana (Japanese: 名取さな) were all asked in interviews, "what is babiniku?", to which they all responded, "it's hell". They provided a variety of reasons why they thought so, including that it "twists your nature" or "has a deep darkness".

According to Magurona, she made the title "Virtual-Girl-Self-Incarnation-Guys Girls' Party" for the livestream because it was originally meant to be "hellish content where guys who have drawn their own avatars and transformed themselves into cute girls get together and make some noise". Over time, the "self" aspect of Magurona's title—which indicated the performers created their avatars themselves—faded away, and the term babiniku could be applied to any man acting through an avatar depicting a cute girl, regardless of how he obtained the avatar. Magurona's performer has no desire to become more feminine himself.

== Vocalization ==
It is difficult to convert an ordinary male voice into a female voice through instrumental manipulation alone. It is important that the performer bring their voice closer to a feminine voice by using their falsetto or a mixed voice as the smaller the change in pitch and formant in the voice changer, the more natural the female voice will be. There are also some babiniku VTubers, such as Takehana Nohto (Japanese: 竹花ノート), who speak in female-like voices without using a voice changer. The voice itself is not the only factor in achieving a feminine voice, speech patterns and intonation are important as well.

== In television ==
On 8 January 2020, NHK Educational TV broadcast about Babiniku in "Nehorin-Pahorin".

== Popular Babiniku VTubers ==
=== With voice changer ===
Ma-oh Magurona (魔王マグロナ, "Magurona the Demon King") or simply "Magurona" (まぐろな)
Her performer is a male illustrator (ukyo_rst; うきょうあーるえすてぃ). She is regarded as a leading figure among the babiniku performers.
Tomari Mari (兎鞠まり)
Her performer is a male illustrator. Her 3D model was created by Han-sode (はんそで).
Hinomori Anzu (日ノ森あんず)
Her 3D model was made by Han-sode, the same artist that created Tomari Mari's avatar.
Onyankopon (オニャンコポン)
Her performer is a male illustrator named Umika Tamano (珠野うみか).
Datenti Yua (だてんちゆあ)
Her 3D model was made by Han-sode, the same artist that created Tomari Mari's avatar.
Hayama Mido (葉山みど)
Her performer is a novelist, video game writer and graphic designer named Nachi Kio (Japanese: 木緒なち). One well-known project he worked on was Remake Our Life!.
Yuu Kamiya (榎宮祐)
Her performer is a male cartoonist. One well-known project he worked on was No Game No Life.
Pochimaru (ぽちまる)
Her performer is a female cartoonist (Pochi Iida, Japanese: 飯田ぽち。). One well-known project she worked on was Anenarumono (姉なるもの). She uses the voice changer Babi-goe (バ美声). She is considered a babiniku because she is a VTuber who created her own avatar, not because she is a male VTuber using a female avatar.

=== Without voice changer ===
Takehana Note (竹花ノート)
Her performer is a male illustrator who worked on The Hidden Dungeon Only I Can Enter.
Fairys (ふぇありす)
Her performer is a man using a feminine voice. An actor who performers in the voice of the opposite gender is called a "both-gender type" (Japanese: 両声類, Hepburn: ryōsērui) which is a pun on the word "amphibian" (Japanese: 両生類, Hepburn: ryōsērui). Her character design is made by Yuzuriha (ユズリハ), so she is not the type of babiniku who created their own female incarnation.
Rimu-to-Maki (りむとまき, "Rimu and Maki")
- Rimukoro (リムコロ)

Her performer is a male cartoonist. One well-known project he worked on was The Helpful Fox Senko-san.

- Maki-hitsuji (巻羊)

Her performer is a male illustrator who worked on Azur Lane.

Ryo Hiiragi (柊椋)
Her performer is a male designer.
Ito Life (伊東ライフ)
Her performer is a male illustrator. He drew the avatar for Ogino Minori, who is a virtual YouTuber and Ōta ward assemblyman (Ogino Minoru, Japanese: おぎの稔).
beatMario (ビートまりお)
Her performer is a male musician from the doujin circle COOL&CREATE, known for the Touhou Project remixes Saishuu kichiku imouto Flandre-S (最終鬼畜妹フランドール・Ｓ, 2004) and Night of Nights (ナイト・オブ・ナイツ, 2007).
