= Tsuchida Bakusen =

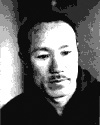
- Tsuchida Bakusen
- Born: Tsuchida Kinji; February 9, 1887; Sado, Niigata, Japan
- Died: June 10, 1936 (aged 49); Kyoto, Japan
- Known for: Painter
- Movement: Nihonga; Society for the Creation of National Painting (国画創作協会, Kokuga Sōsaku Kyōkai)

Tsuchida Bakusen (土田麦僊; February 9, 1887 – June 10, 1936) was the art-name of a Japanese painter in the Nihonga style, active during the Taishō and early Shōwa eras. His birth name was Tsuchida Kinji (土田金二).

== Biography ==
He was born on Sado island in Niigata Prefecture into a wealthy and influential family. His younger brother was the noted philosopher Tsuchida Kyōson (1891-1934). As an adolescent, Bakusen's father put him on the career path of a Buddhist priest, but he fled the temple where he was apprenticed in order to study art instead. He was accepted as a student by painter Takeuchi Seihō, and later studied at the Kyoto Kaiga Senmon Gakko (present day Kyoto City University of Arts) from which he graduated in 1911.

In 1918, Bakusen established a painting collective together with Murakami Kagaku, Ono Chikkyō, Sakakibara Shihō, and Nonagase Banka called the Kokuga Society (Kokuga Sōsaku Kyōkai, or "Society for the Creation of National Painting"), which was used as a vehicle to disseminate the group's eclectic style combining western yōga and Japanese (Nihonga) painting techniques and styles. His favorite subjects were women (bijinga), especially portraits of maiko, but he also painted flowers and still life themes. The Kokuga Society established its own annual exhibition, the Kokuten (abbreviation for "Kokuga Sōsaku Kyōkai Tenrankai") in competition with the increasingly restrictive Bunten Exhibitions in 1918. Seven Kokuten exhibitions were held between 1918 and 1928.

In 1921, the Kokuga Society went on hiatus when Bakusen traveled to Europe with Ono Chikkyō to tour Western art museums. They returned after a little more than a year, and resumed the Kokuga Society in 1923. Bakusen was particularly fond of French Impressionism and Post-Impressionism, especially the works of Paul Gauguin, Vincent van Gogh and Paul Cézanne, and collected several of their works while in Europe. The Kokuga Society broke up in 1928, due to financial difficulties and internal disagreements. In 1934, Bakusen was appointed to the Teikoku Bijutsuin (Imperial Art Academy). He died in June 1936 of pancreatic cancer. His grave is at the temple of Chishaku-in in Kyoto.

One of his works from 1918, Bathhouse Maiden (湯女図, Yunazu), now at the Tokyo National Museum of Modern Art is registered as an Important Cultural Property (ICP) by the Agency for Cultural Affairs. However, his painting Maiko in Garden (舞妓林泉, Bugi rinsen) from 1923, owned by the same museum, is considered his masterpiece.

== Philately ==
One of Bakusen's works was selected as the subject of a commemorative postage stamp by the Japanese government:

- 1979: Bugirinsen, commemorating the 1968 Philatelic Week

== Noted works ==
Maiko in Landscape
- Bukirinsen (舞妓林泉) (Japanese)
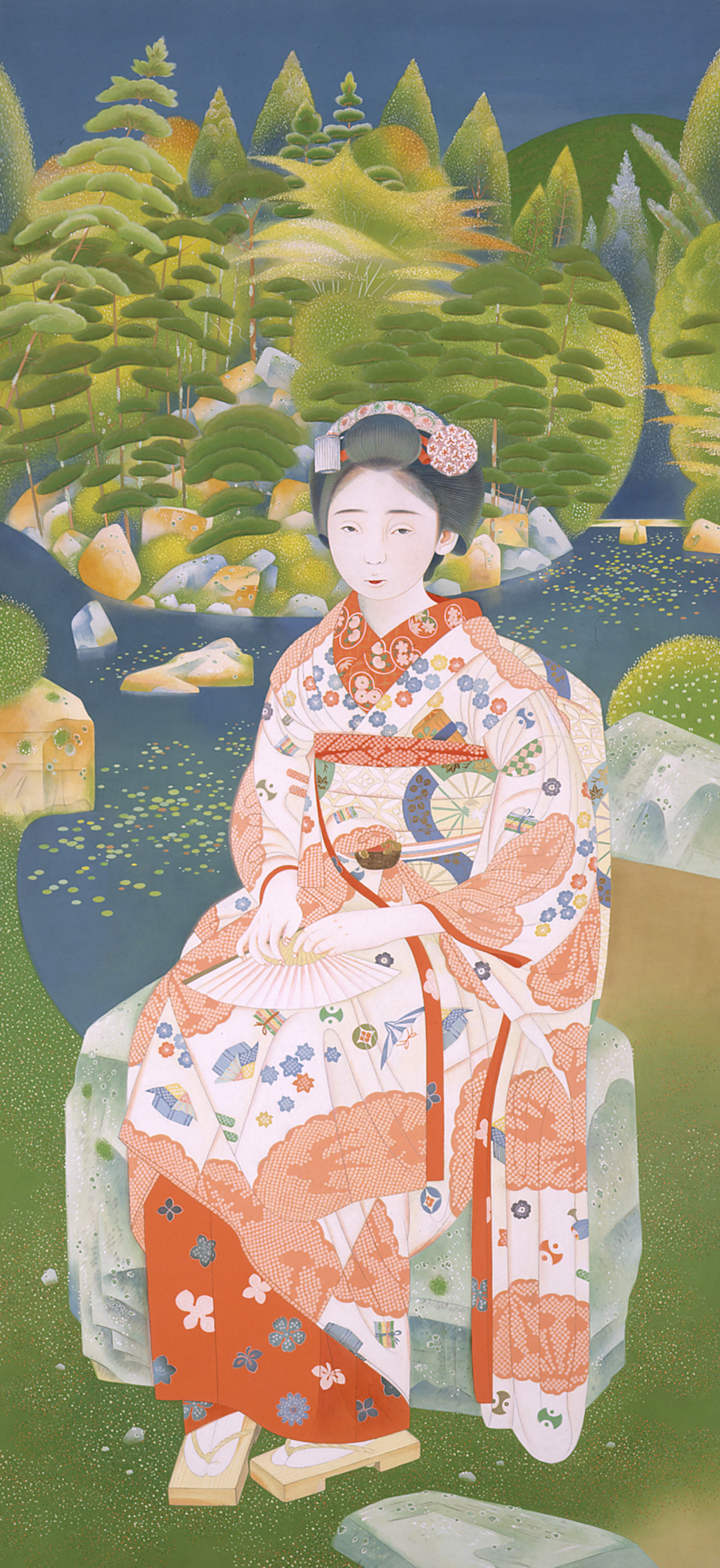
- Artist: Tsuchida Bakusen
- Year: 1924
- Type: Nihonga
- Dimensions: 217.7 cm × 102.0 cm (85.7 in × 40.2 in)
- Location: Tokyo National Museum of Modern Art, Tokyo

- Island Woman (島の女, Shima no onna), 1912, Tokyo National Museum of Modern Art
- Bathhouse Maiden (湯女図, Yunazu), 1918, Tokyo National Museum of Modern Art
- Maiko in Garden (舞妓林泉, Bugirinsen), 1924, Tokyo National Museum of Modern Art
- Woman Peddlar of Ohara (大原女, Oharame), 1927, Kyoto National Museum of Modern Art

== Gallery ==
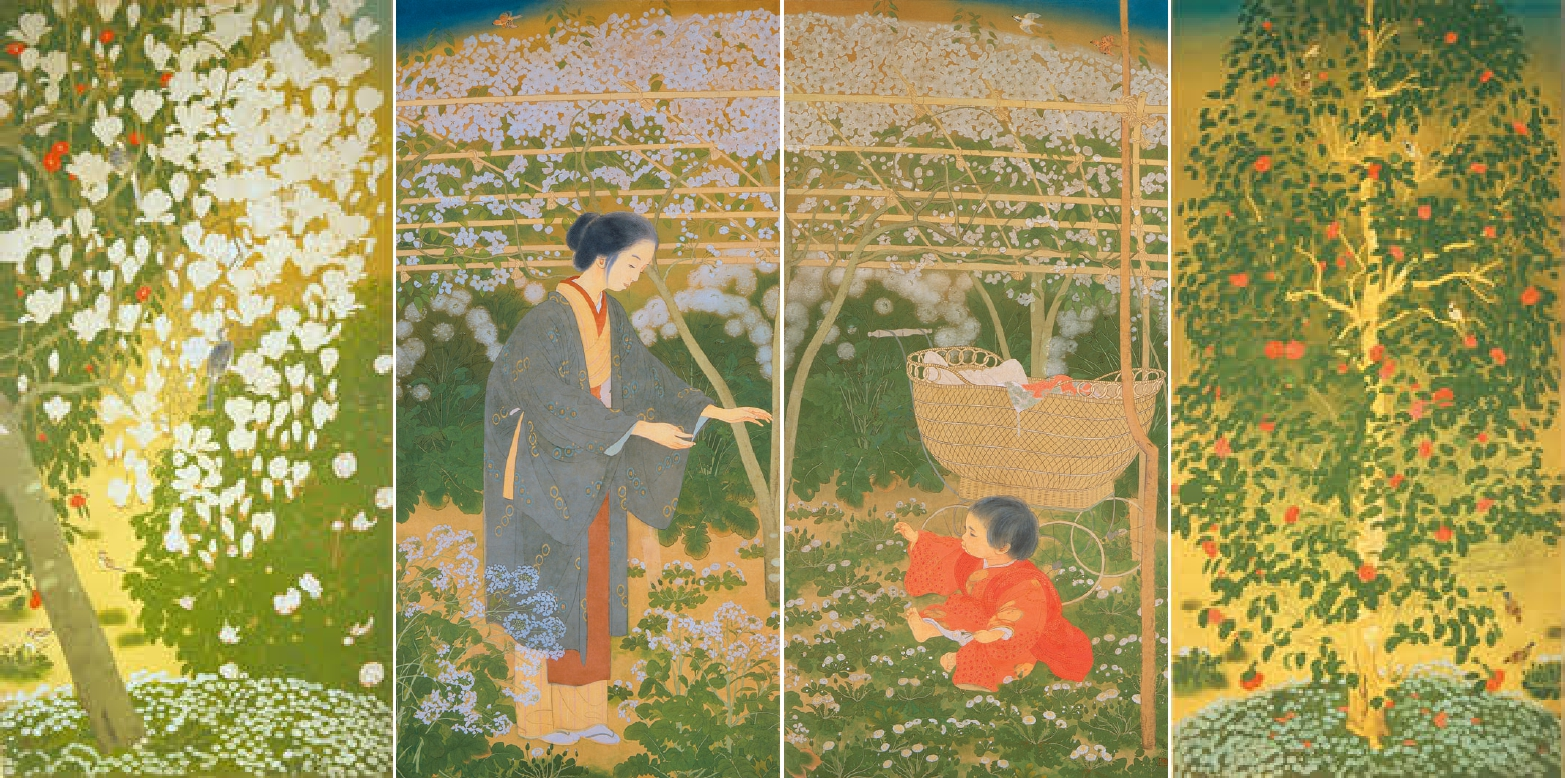
Spring

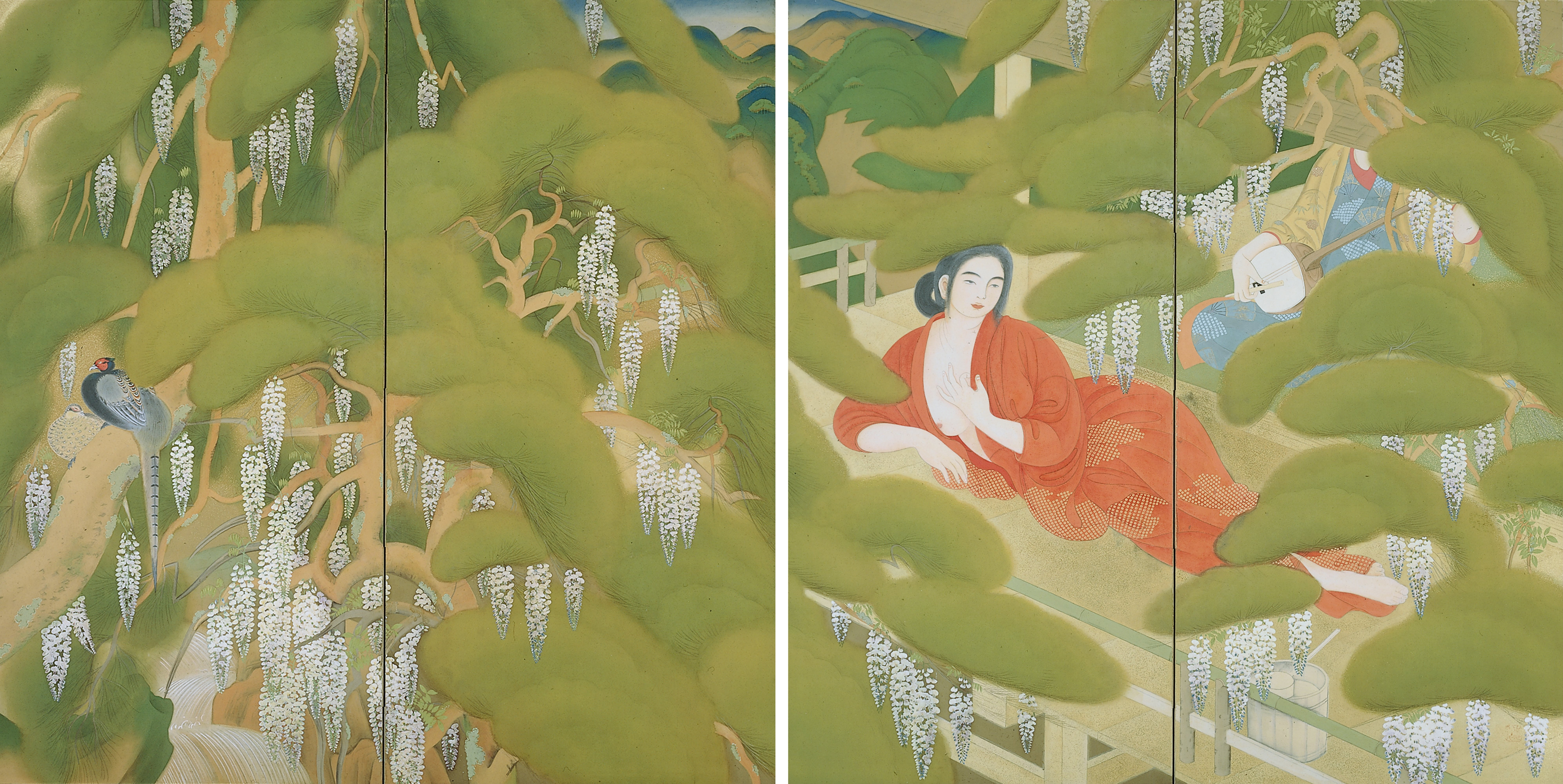
Serving Girl in a Spa (Yuna)

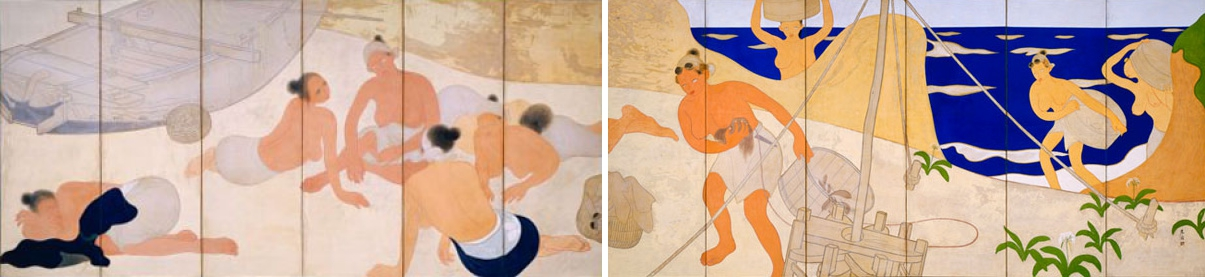
Woman Divers (Ama)

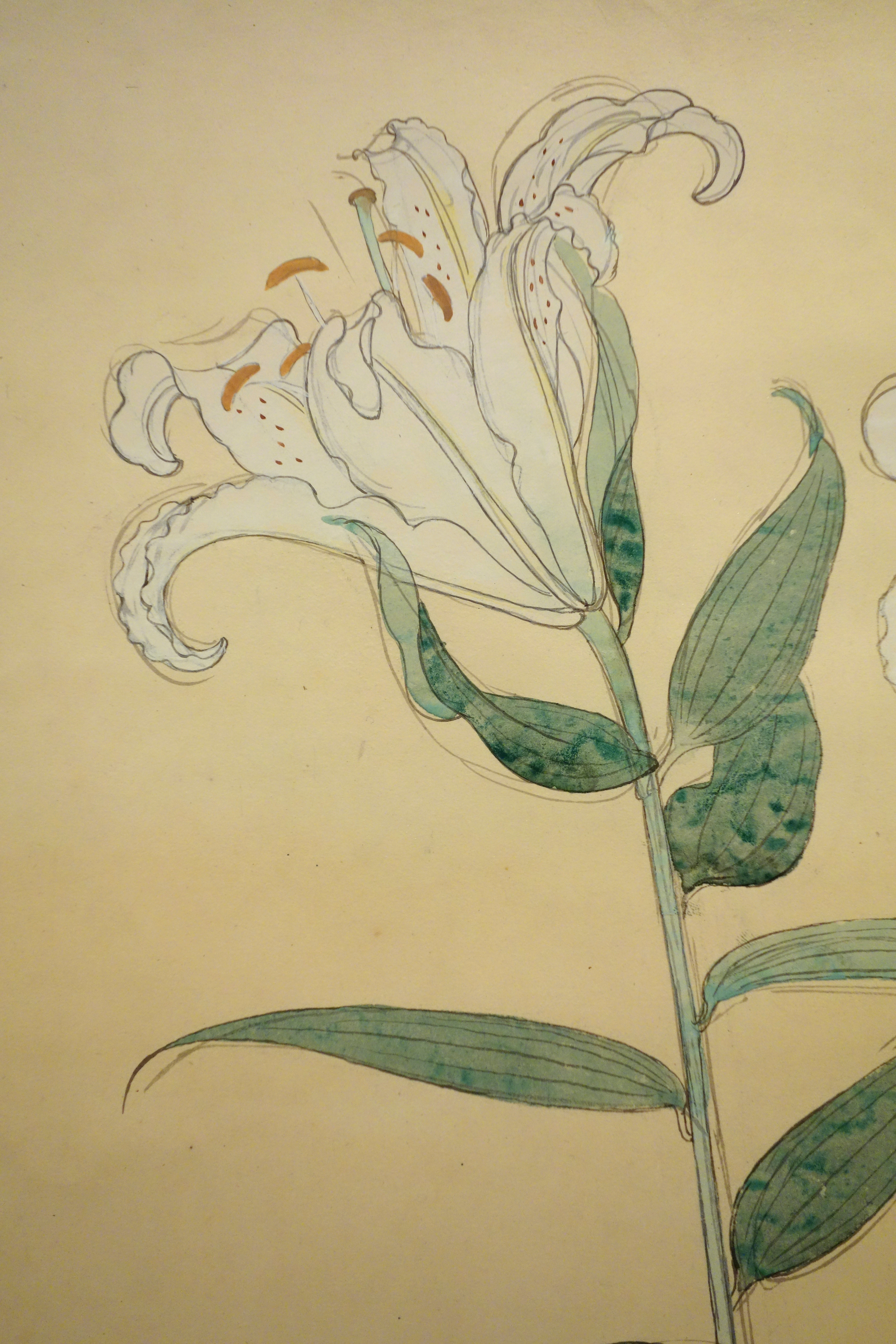
Sketch of White Lilies, 1935, sumi and color on paper - National Museum of Modern Art, Tokyo

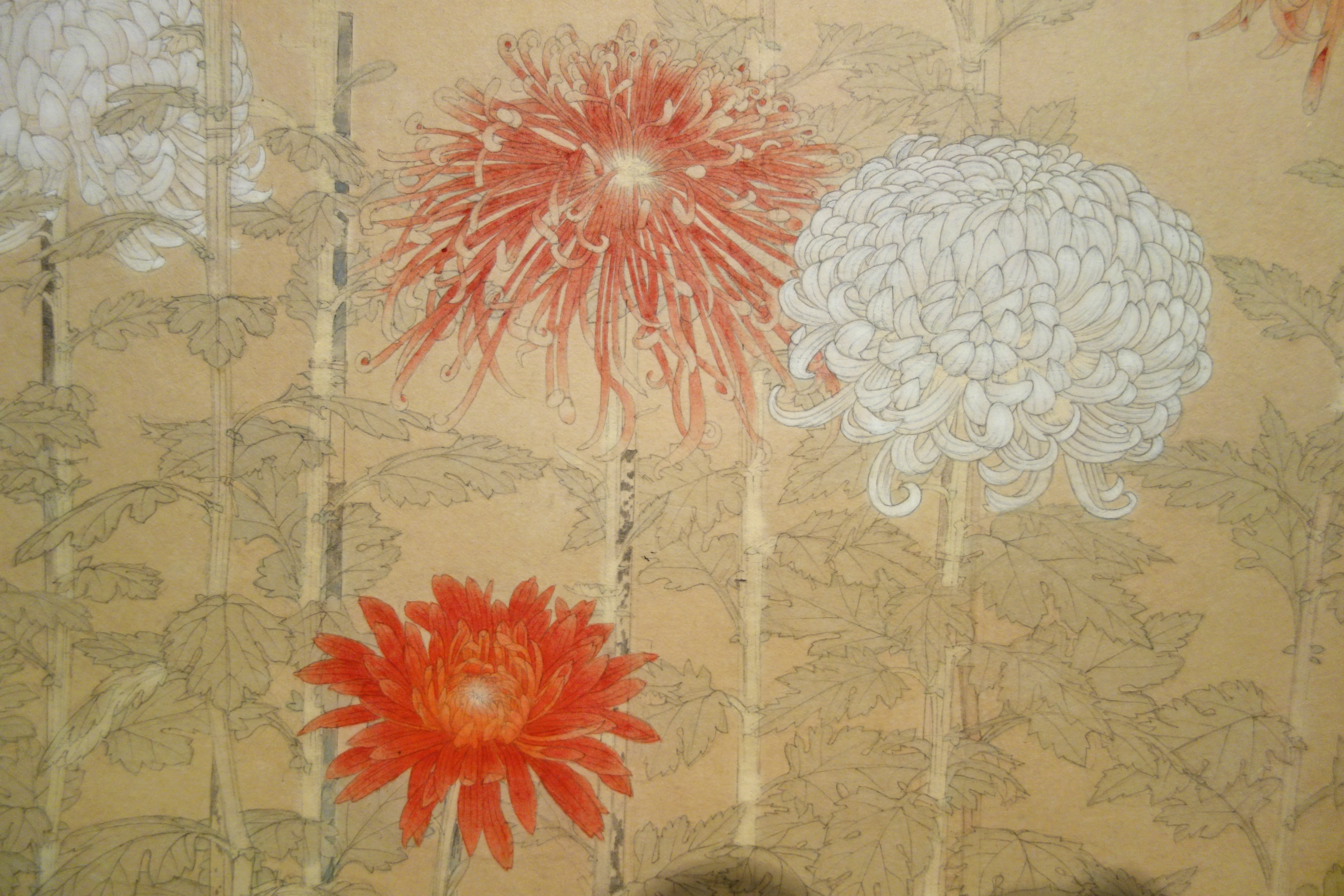
Sketch of Chrysanthemums, 1933, pencil and color on paper - National Museum of Modern Art, Tokyo
