= Masahiro Mori (roboticist) =

Japanese roboticist (1927–2025)

Masahiro Mori (森 政弘, Mori Masahiro; 12 February 1927 – 12 January 2025) was a Japanese roboticist noted for his pioneering work in the fields of robotics and automation, his research achievements in humans' emotional responses to non-human entities, as well as for his views on religion. The ASIMO robot was designed by one of Masahiro's students.

== Life and career ==
In 1970, Mori published "Bukimi No Tani" (不気味の谷 The Uncanny Valley) in Energy. The article forwarded the hypothesis that as robots become more humanlike, they appear more familiar until a point is reached at which subtle imperfections of appearance make them look eerie. The observation led Mori to the belief that robot builders should not attempt to make their creations overly lifelike in appearance and motion.

In 1974, Mori published The Buddha in the Robot: a Robot Engineer's Thoughts on Science and Religion in which he discussed the metaphysical implications of robotics. In the book, he wrote "I believe robots have the buddha-nature within them—that is, the potential for attaining buddhahood."

In 1988, Mori founded the first nationwide robot-building competition in Japan and widely promoted robot competitions in the years since then. Of Robocon, Mori said, "When we lose ourselves in an activity, we become creative, friendly and funny. Think of how children are when they are playing. They are completely absorbed in the game; their eyes shine and they are all smiles. They're into the game, not themselves. That's the message of Robocon, too: To not be self-centered, but to love others and share the joy of creating wonderful things."

Mori was later president of the Mukta Research Institute, which he founded in Tokyo in order to promote his views on religion and robots. The institute also provides consultation on the use of automation and robotics in industry. Mori died on 12 January 2025, at the age of 97.
