= Anime Expo =

Anime convention in Los Angeles

- Status: Active
- Genre: Anime; Manga; Video games
- Venue: Los Angeles Convention Center
- Locations: Los Angeles, California, U.S.
- Coordinates: 34.039737°N 118.270293°W
- Country: United States
- Inaugurated: July 3, 1992; 34 years ago
- Most recent: July 2, 2026; 4 months ago
- Attendance: ▲110,000 (2018)
- Organizer: Society for the Promotion of Japanese Animation
- Filing status: Non-profit
- Website: anime-expo.org

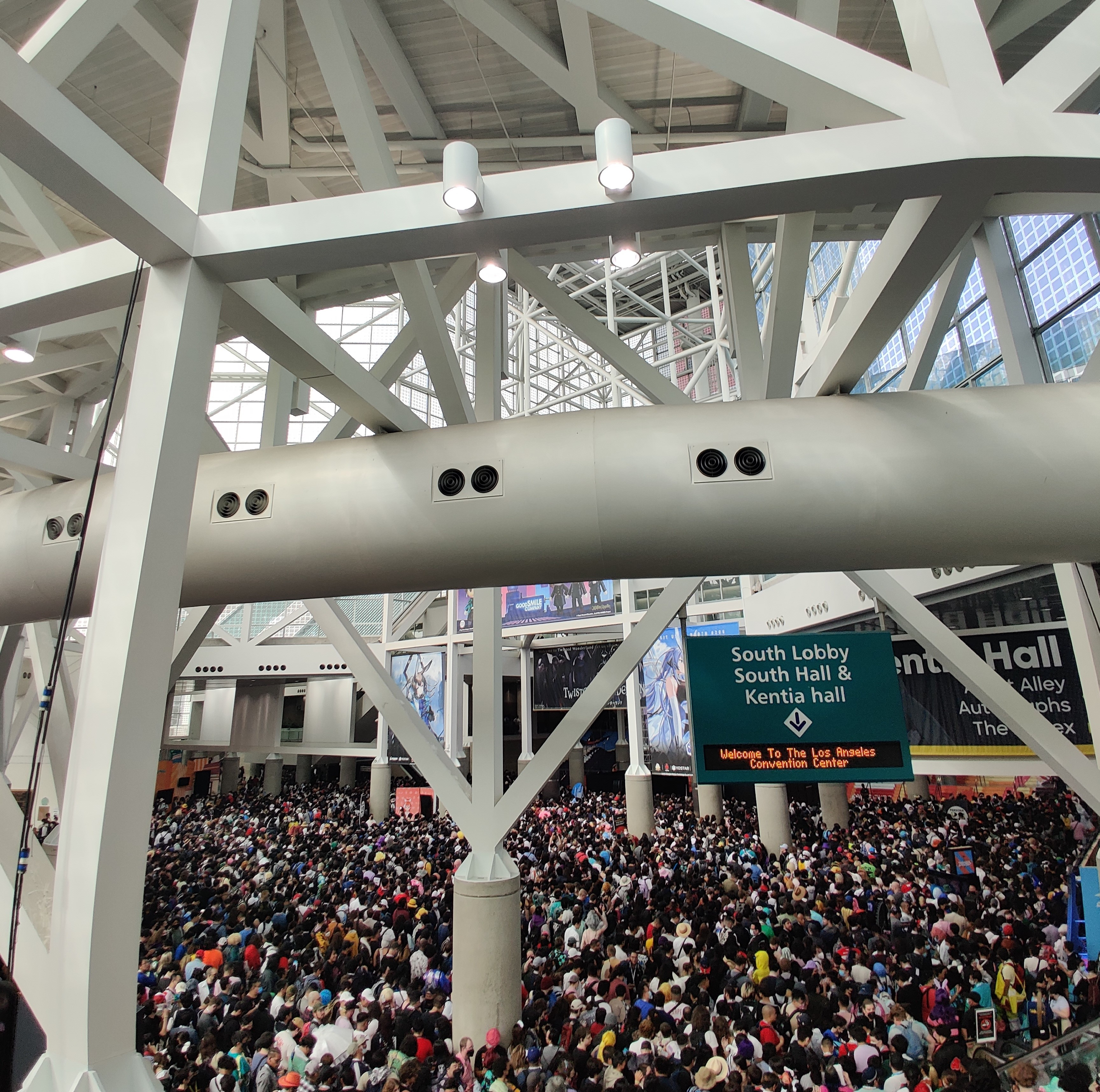
Attendees at AX 2022

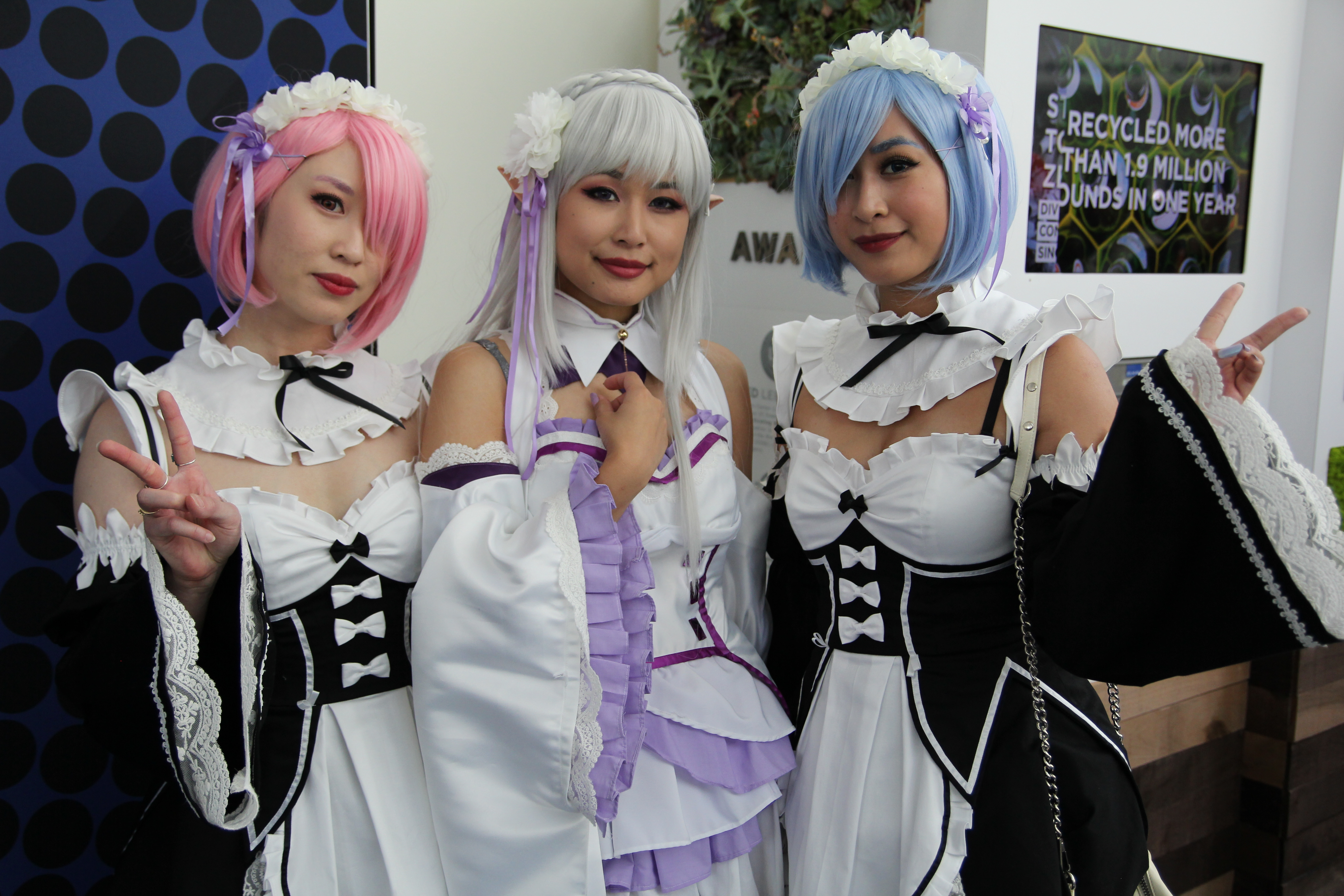
Re:Zero cosplayers at AX 2018

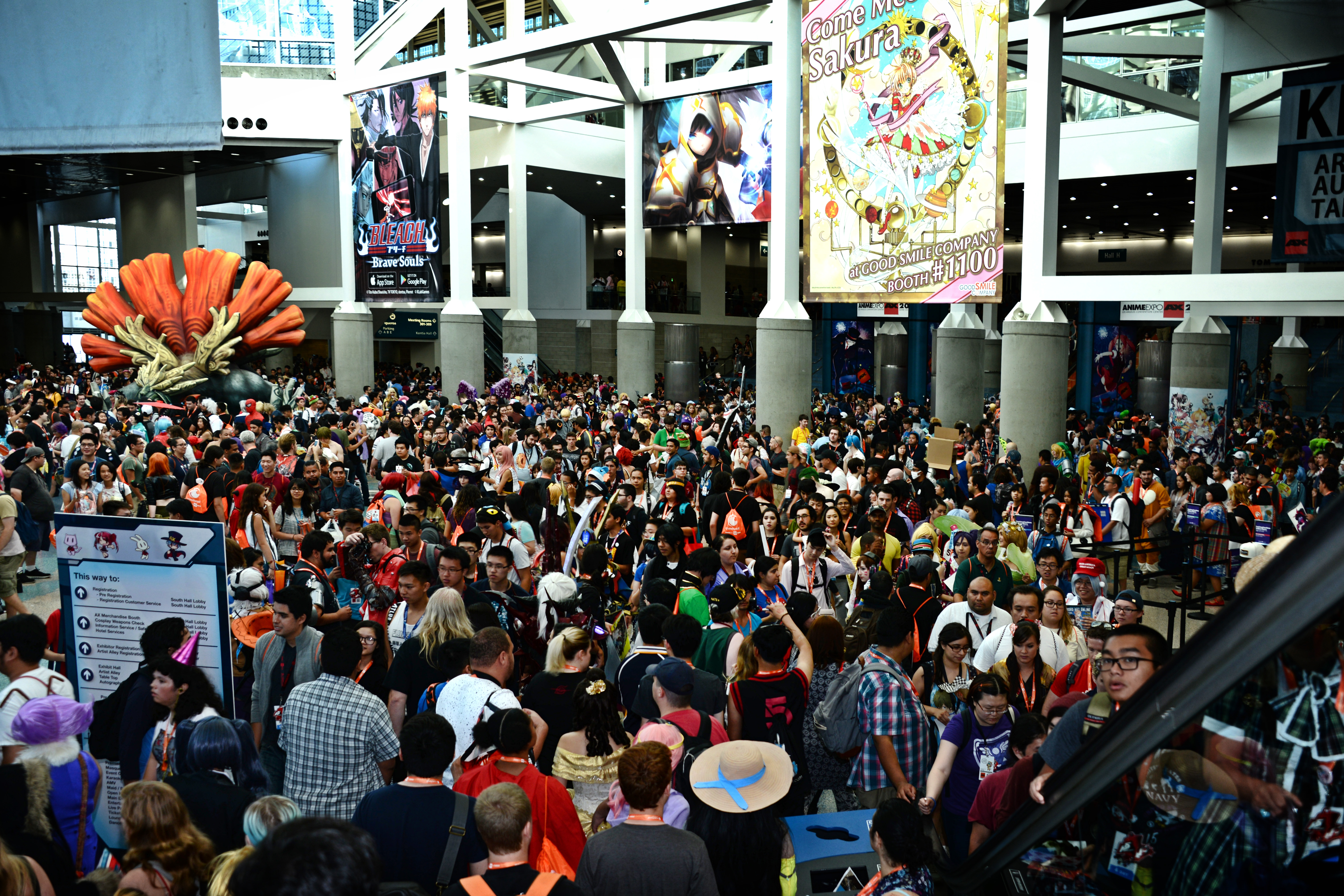
Attendees gather at the LA Convention Center's South Hall during AX 2016.

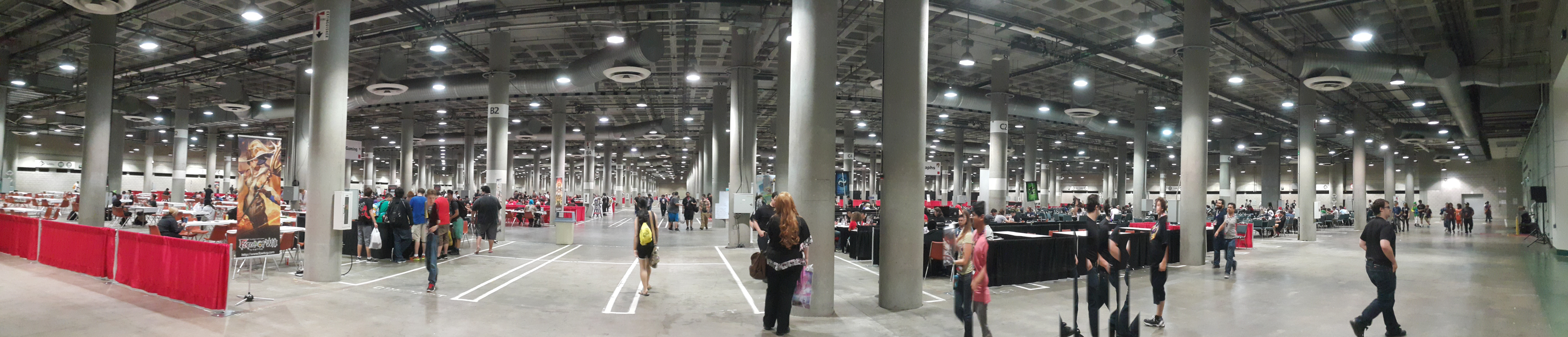
People at Anime Expo 2015

Anime Expo, abbreviated AX, is an American anime convention held in Los Angeles, California, and organized by the non-profit Society for the Promotion of Japanese Animation (SPJA). The convention is traditionally held annually on the first weekend of July, spanning the course of four days. Anime Expo is regularly hosted at the Los Angeles Convention Center but has also been held in other cities such as Anaheim, San Jose, New York, and Tokyo.

Anime Expo has events and activities during the convention for attendees to take part in such as guest panels, tabletop gaming, competitions, an arcade, and concerts.

== Convention history ==
=== History ===
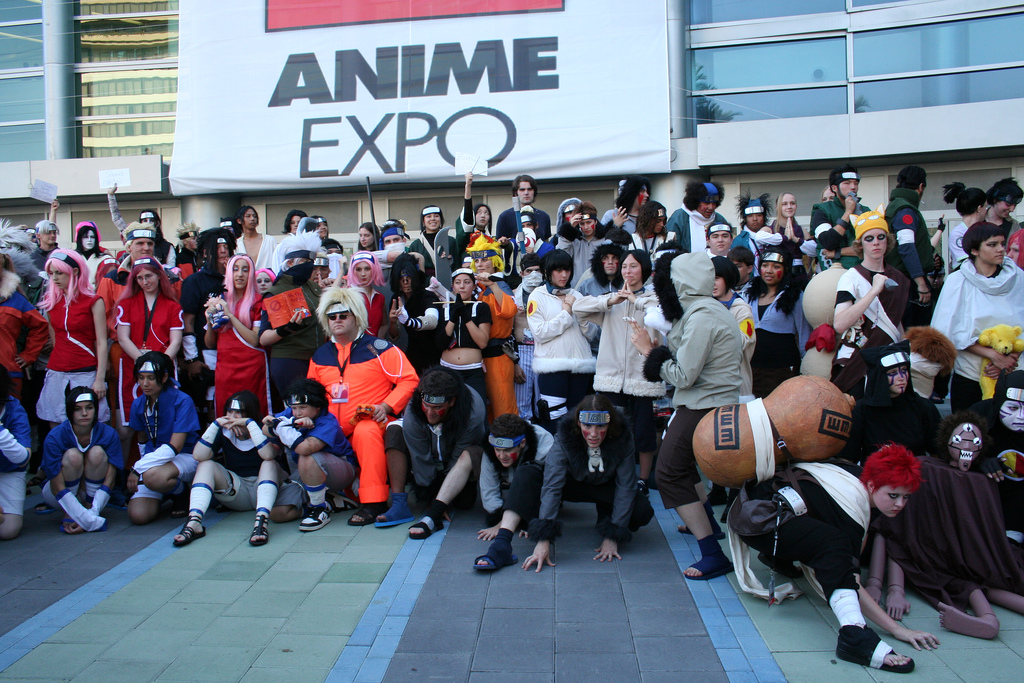
Naruto meet-up at AX 2006

The first Anime Expo was held from July 3–6, 1992 at the Red Lion Hotel in San Jose, California. Many of its original staff came from Anime Con, an anime convention held in San Jose in 1991, and later absorbed by the SPJA in 1992. In 1994, Anime Expo made a strategic relocation to the Southern California area and all subsequent conventions have taken place there since.

It currently holds the title of North America's largest anime convention, a title which it has consistently held every year except in 2003, in which its attendance was slightly edged out by the east coast anime convention Otakon. From 1,750 attendees in 1992, Anime Expo's size has increased to over 107,658 in 2017, making Anime Expo the largest anime and manga convention in North America.

In March 2009, chief executive officer Trulee Karahashi, who had been a part of Anime Expo and SPJA in various capacities for 11 years, left the organization. In September, former Universal Studios executive Michael Lattanzio was later hired as the SPJA's new CEO.

In January 2010, eight members of Anime Expo's upper management team (ConCom) publicly resigned because of disagreements over the organization's new direction set forth by Lattanzio. One significant point of contention was Lattanzio's decision to refocus and restructure the SPJA's marketing efforts, starting with the dismissal of a PR and marketing contractor that the organization had a close working relationship with since 2004. Additionally, two other personnel had already left for other reasons, leaving only the vice-chair and two others as returning members of the previous year's team.

In September 2010, Lattanzio was released from his CEO position.

In early 2012, Anime News Network reported that Anime Expo had suffered a $1.2 million loss in 2010. The 2011 convention saw a $100,000 profit and reduced the outstanding debt to $700,000. The article also stated that one of the creditors, IDG World Expo, will be taking over several aspects of the organization, with guest selection and programming remaining under SPJA control. Additionally, Takayuki Karahashi has been elected as chairman of the board of directors.

The convention continued to be located at the LACC through 2019. In April 2016, Marc Perez left the company, with Ray Chiang becoming acting CEO of SPJA.

On June 30, 2017, the first Pre-Show Night was added to the Anime Expo, which included the Neon District, hosting the World Cosplay Summit U.S. Finals, and premieres.

As the convention's attendance has grown, it's seen long lines for entry into the convention hall, which organizers said was due to safety and security concerns.

In the months leading to the 2020 event, a global coronavirus outbreak created concerns related to large gatherings, such as Anime Expo. On April 17, 2020, the SPJA announced that it was cancelling Anime Expo 2020, citing "health and safety" concerns. However, the SPJA stated it still planned to hold the 2021 event on its normal July dates. On May 27, 2020, they announced a two-day online convention, titled Anime Expo Lite, which took place on July 3 and 4, 2020. On March 3, 2021, the SPJA canceled the 2021 live convention, and announced that the Anime Expo Lite would instead be held on the 2021 schedule, citing "continued uncertainties surrounding the COVID-19 pandemic." Despite the COVID-19 pandemic, Anime Expo returned in-person in 2022; Anime Expo 2022 began on July 1 and ended on July 4 as an in-person event for the first time since 2019.

Anime Expo in 2023 suffered from serious overcrowding issues, and also occurred during a hotel staff strike. Layout and operational changes led to less crowding in 2024, but the panel ticketing system implemented was not effective. The 2025 event brought roughly $110 million to the economy, with the 2026 event bringing over $115 million.

=== Convention locations ===
Dates	Location	Atten.	Guests
July 3–6, 1992	Red Lion Hotel; San Jose, California	1,750	Jerry Beck, L. Lois Buhalis, Ben Dunn, Robert Fenelon, Lea Hernandez, Seiji Horibuchi, Ken Iyadomi, Shawne Kleckner, Trish Ledoux, Carl Macek, Luke Menichelli, Haruhiko Mikimoto, Keiji Nakazawa, Robert Napton, John O'Donnell, Claude J. Pelletier, David Keith Riddick, Frederik L. Schodt, Buichi Terasawa, Jeff Thompson, Yoshiyuki Tomino, Steve Wang, Robert Woodhead, and Toshifumi Yoshida.
July 2–4, 1993	Parc Oakland Hotel and Oakland Convention Center; Oakland, California	1,693	Keita Amemiya, Kia Asamiya, Robert DeJesus, Doug Dlin, Robert Fenelon, Peter Goll, Kenji Goto, David Ho, Seiji Horibuchi, Leo Hourvitz, Yasuhiro Imagawa, Junco Ito, Makoto Kobayashi, Steve Kyte, Trish Ledoux, Carl Macek, Helen McCarthy, Robert Napton, Yasushi Nirasawa, Martin Oulette, Wil Overton, Claude J. Pelletier, Jeff Pidgeon, Frederik L. Schodt, Jan Scott-Frazier, Masatoshi Tahara, Takayuki Takeya, and Toshifumi Yoshida.
July 1–3, 1994	Anaheim Marriott Hotel and Anaheim Convention Center; Anaheim, California	2,057	Allen Hastings, Shoji Kawamori, Hiroyuki Kitazume, Izumi Matsumoto, Haruhiko Mikimoto, Jan Scott-Frazier, Minoru Takanashi, and Nobuteru Yuuki.
June 30 – July 2, 1995	Los Angeles Airport Hilton; Los Angeles, California	2,138	Amy Chia, Danger Productions, Allen Hastings, Leo Hourvitz, Kazuhiko Ikeguchi, Noboru Ishiguro, Jay Miao, Haruhiko Mikimoto, Koichi Ohata, Nobuyuki Ohnishi, Jan Scott-Frazier, Ryoei Tsukimura, Satoshi Urushibara, and Kinji Yoshimoto.
June 28–30, 1996	Anaheim Marriott Hotel and Anaheim Convention Center; Anaheim, California	2,918	Hideaki Anno, Hiroki Hayashi, Noboru Ishiguro, Yoshiaki Kawajiri, Hiroyuki Kitazume, Toshihiko Nishikubo, Hiromasa Ogura, Koichi Ohata, Ai Orikasa, Mamoru Oshii, Jan Scott-Frazier, Kenichi Sonoda, Yumi Takada, and Ryoei Tsukimura.
July 4–6, 1997	Los Angeles Airport Hilton; Los Angeles, California	3,826	Jan Scott-Frazier
July 3–5, 1998	Anaheim Hilton and Towers; Anaheim, California	4,883	Mika Akitaka, Akira Kamiya, Hiroyuki Kitakubo, Yasuhiro Nightow, Jan Scott-Frazier, Nobuyuki Takahashi, Yuu Watase, and Takahiro Yoshimatsu.
July 16–18, 1999	Anaheim Hilton and Towers; Anaheim, California	6,400	Mika Akitaka, Mari Iijima, Yoko Kanno, Hiromi Matsushita, Lisa Ortiz, Gilles Poitras, and Jan Scott-Frazier.
June 30 – July 3, 2000	Disneyland Hotel; Anaheim, California	9,700	Rika Fukami, Keiji Gotoh, Kunihiko Ikuhara, Noboru Ishiguro, Akira Kamiya, Yukio Kikukawa, Mahiro Maeda, Yutaka Minowa, Range Murata, Kazuto Nakazawa, Yasuhiro Nightow, Chiho Saito, Jan Scott-Frazier, Yuu Watase, and Nobuteru Yuuki.
July 5–8, 2001	Long Beach Convention Center; Long Beach, California	13,000	Hisashi Abe, Morio Asaka, Kia Asamiya, Jo Chen, Kikuko Inoue, Masayuki Kojima, Hidenori Matsubara, Haruhiko Mikimoto, Jan Scott-Frazier, Makoto Uno, and Yuu Watase.
July 4–7, 2002	Long Beach Convention Center; Long Beach, California	15,250	Jo Chen, Hiroaki Goda, Tsukasa Hojo, Kunihiko Ikuhara, Hiroaki Inoue, Yoko Ishida, Noboru Ishiguro, Masashi Ishihama, Akira Kamiya, Shoji Kawamori, Maria Kawamura, Yukio Kikukawa, Hideyuki Kurata, Koichi Mashimo, Koji Masunari, Hidenori Matsubara, Toshiharu Murata, Mamiko Noto, Puffy AmiYumi, Nobuhiro Watsuki, and Takumi Yamazaki.
July 3–6, 2003	Anaheim Convention Center; Anaheim, California	17,000	Yoshitoshi ABe, Kazuki Akane, Duel Jewel, Rebecca Forstadt, Crispin Freeman, Kazuhiro Furuhashi, Mitsuru Hongo, Taliesin Jaffe, Yuki Kajiura, Yousuke Kuroda, Mahiro Maeda, Atsuko Nakajima, Liam O'Brien, Koushi Rikudo, Goro Taniguchi, Misa Watanabe, Kazuki Yao, and Nobuteru Yuuki.
July 2–5, 2004	Anaheim Convention Center; Anaheim, California	25,000	Koichi Chigira, Kate Davis, Hiromi Hirata, Yoko Ishida, Masashi Ishihama, Shinichiro Kimura, Hideyuki Kurata, Wendee Lee, Michael Lindsay, Masao Maruyama, Shino Masanori, Koji Masunari, Yuji Matsukura, MIQ, Minoru Murao, Range Murata, Toshiharu Murata, Lee Myung-Jin, Satoshi Nishimura, Kazufumi Nomura, Tomonori Ochikoshi, Yoshiyuki Okamura, Ichiro Okouchi, Kaoru Ozawa, Tadashi Ozawa, Cindy Robinson, Michelle Ruff, Katsushi Sakurabi, Soichiro Sano, Carrie Savage, Tomokazu Seki, Ren Usami, Cindy H. Yamauchi, and Reina Yoshimura.
July 1–4, 2005	Anaheim Convention Center; Anaheim, California	33,000	Hunter MacKenzie Austin, Greg Ayres, JB Blanc, Johnny Yong Bosch, Colleen Clinkenbeard, Siobhan Flynn, Crispin Freeman, Ugetsu Hakua, Rachel Hirschfeld, Ryo Horikawa, Hiroyuki Kitakubo, Osamu Kobayashi, Tsuneo Kobayashi, Kotoko, Sara Lahti, Wendee Lee, Range Murata, Liam O'Brien, Hiroshi Osaka, Maaya Sakamoto, Carrie Savage, Tomokazu Seki, Miho Shimogasa, J.D. Stone, Helena Taylor, Wendee Tomson, Kazue Yamamoto, and Akihito Yamashita.
July 1–4, 2006	Anaheim Convention Center; Anaheim, California	40,647	Laura Bailey, Troy Baker, Johnny Yong Bosch, CLAMP, Colleen Clinkenbeard, Koge Donbo*, Quinton Flynn, Crispin Freeman, Toru Furuya, Kyle Hebert, Noboru Ishiguro, Yutaka Izubuchi, Ryuhei Kitamura, Tomoki Kyoda, Mana, Mike McFarland, Vic Mignogna, Seiji Mizushima, Hiroshi Nagahama, Atsuko Nakajima, Jeff Nimoy, Mick Takeuchi, Travis Willingham, and yozuca*.
June 29 – July 2, 2007	Long Beach Convention Center; Long Beach, California	41,671	Tetsuro Araki, Michael Arias, Greg Ayres, Laura Bailey, Steve Blum, Johnny Yong Bosch, Minori Chihara, Leah Clark, Colleen Clinkenbeard, Justin Cook, Caitlin Glass, Yuko Goto, Kate Higgins, Aya Hirano, Yuuna Inamura, Eisaku Inoue, Chiaki Ishikawa, Taliesin Jaffe, Satoru Kannagi, Hideo Katsumata, Takaaki Kidani, Masaru Kitao, Mike McFarland, Mary Elizabeth McGlynn, Haruko Momoi, Shuhei Morita, Hiroshi Nagahama, Sumire Nanohana, Tomonori Ochikoshi, Tony Oliver, OreSkaBand, Kate Oxley, Takaharu Ozaki, Brina Palencia, Orion Pitts, Brandon Potter, Dai Sato, savage genius, Patrick Seitz, Stephanie Sheh, Anna Tsuchiya, Kounosuke Uda, and Travis Willingham.
July 3–6, 2008	Los Angeles Convention Center; Los Angeles, California	43,000 (warm); 103,000 (turnstile)	Yamila Abraham, Masahiro Ando, Ayane, Greg Ayres, Cameron Baity, Mike Fasolo, Fullmoon 13, GaGaalinG, David Hayter, Masamitsu Hidaka, Yoko Ishida, Jyukai, Hiromi Kato, Hideyuki Kikuchi, Kuro, LM.C, Chris Many, Jonathan Meza, Vic Mignogna, Jason Charles Miller, Jeanette Moffat, Shoko Nakagawa, Tony Oliver, le Peruggine, Riku, Tom Root, Kaeko Sakamoto, Patrick Seitz, Toshihiko Seki, Kevin Shinick, Akemi Takada, Saiko Takaki, Thee Out Mods, VelBet, and Travis Willingham.
July 2–5, 2009	Los Angeles Convention Center; Los Angeles, California	44,000 (unique); 109,000 (turnstile)	Tomo Asaha, Karan Ashley, auncia, Robert Axelrod, Nakia Burrise, Steve Cardenas, Northrup Davis, Daniel Ewing, Mike Fasolo, Blake Anthony Foster, Kun Gao, Douglas Goldstein, Barbara Goodson, Seth Green, Hangry & Angry, Kyle Hebert, Jason Hoffs, Ken Hoinsky, Hiroyuki Imaishi, Daisuke Ishiwatari, Noriyuki Jinguji, Walter E. Jones, Takeshi Kajii, Shigeru Kitayama, Shawne Kleckner, Yun Kouga, Yousuke Kuroda, Robert Le, Patricia Ja Lee, Joshua Long, Nobuo Masuda, Monica May, Mike McFarland, Chris McKay, Breckin Meyer, Seiji Mizushima, Moi dix Mois, Toshimichi Mori, Toshiyuki Morikawa, Morning Musume, Robert Napton, Yasuhiro Nightow, Atsushi Nishigori, Satoshi Nishimura, Takashi Okazaki, Austin Osueke, Race Owen, Brina Palencia, Luis Reyes, Amy Rolle, Reggie Rolle, Tom Root, Satsuki, Justin Sevakis, Eric P. Sherman, Kevin Shinick, Dan Southworth, Catherine Sutherland, Tsunku, Roger Velasco, Cerina Vincent, Chris Violette, Kevy Vona, Kari Wahlgren, Selwyn Jaydon Ward, and Erik Weiner.
July 1–4, 2010	Los Angeles Convention Center; Los Angeles, California	46,000 (warm); 105,000 (turnstile)	Saki Aibu, AKB48, Yuu Asakawa, Beni, Johnny Yong Bosch, Danny Choo, DJ Chucky, Guhroovy, Kyle Hebert, Rei Hiroe, Yui Horie, Tomohiko Ishii, Kenji Kamiyama, Yoko Kanno, Toshihiro Kawamoto, Eri Kitamura, Katsuyuki Konishi, Robert Le, M-Project, m1dy, May'n, MELL, Vic Mignogna, Jason Charles Miller, Masakazu Morita, Megumi Nakajima, Satoru Nakamura, No+Chin, RSP, Kaeko Sakamoto, DJ Schwarzenegger, Eric P. Sherman, Sophia, Nobuyuki Takahashi, Cristina Vee, and Shinichi Watanabe.
July 1–4, 2011	Los Angeles Convention Center; Los Angeles, California	47,000 (unique); 128,000 (turnstile)	Takanori Aki, Tetsuro Araki, Peter S. Beagle, Hiroyuki Birukawa, Koichi Chigira, Danny Choo, Danceroid, Dig Jelly, Toshihiro Fukuoka, Toshio Furukawa, Fred Gallagher, Kentaro Hashimoto, Hiroyuki Ito, Taliesin Jaffe, Kalafina, Makoto Kobayashi, Onyx Kobayashi, Maon Kurosaki, Izumi Matsumoto, Vic Mignogna, Hatsune Miku, Jason Charles Miller, Seiji Mizushima, Toshiyuki Morikawa, Sohei Niikawa, Nirgilis, Wataru Sasaki, Miyuki Sawashiro, Takaaki Suzuki, Masayoshi Tanaka, Tune in Tokyo, Stephanie Yanez, Katsuyuki Hirano, Takaki Kosaka, Kenta Sugano, and Kyle Hebert.
June 29 – July 2, 2012	Los Angeles Convention Center; Los Angeles, California	49,400 (unique); 130,000 (turnstile)	Animetal USA, Ei Aoki, Misako Aoki, Morio Asaka, Steve Blum, Danny Choo, Kunihiko Hamada, Ryo Horikawa, Yuki Kajiura, Hikaru Kondo, Rikiya Koyama, LiSA, Cyril Lumboy, Jamie Marchi, Joel McDonald, Nobuhiko Okamoto, Monica Rial, Tatsuo Sato, Ian Sinclair, Takuya Tsunoki, Yosuke Adachi, ayami, bamboo, Atsuhiro Iwakami, Shinji Katakura, Izumi Kitta, Minami Kuribayashi, Jessica Nigri, Foo Midori, Koichiro Natsume, Aimi Terakawa, Tamiyasu Tomoe, and Kouki Yoshimune.
July 4–7, 2013	Los Angeles Convention Center; Los Angeles, California	61,000 (unique); 161,000 (turnstile)	Takanori Aki, Johnny Yong Bosch, Danny Choo, Eyeshine, Kazuhiro Furuhashi, Alodia Gosiengfiao, Jessie James Grelle, Megumi Han, Kyle Hebert, Aya Ikeda, Kazuhiko Inoue, Mitsuhisa Ishikawa, Noizi Ito, Kaya, Vic Mignogna, Moon Stream, Sohei Niikawa, Mari Okada, Ram Rider, Christopher Sabat, Makoto Shinkai, Nobuyuki Takahashi, Austin Tindle, Alexis Tipton, Eric Vale, Masaaki Yuasa, Kazuhiko Inoue, Nobuhiro Kikuchi, Kazuchika Kise, Hiroaki Matsuura, Porno Graffitti, Keigo Sasaki, George Wada, and Max Watanabe.
July 3–6, 2014	Los Angeles Convention Center; Los Angeles, California	80,000 (unique); 220,000 (turnstile)	Angela, Eir Aoi, Linda Ballantyne, Sonya Belousova, Karen Bernstein, Danny Choo, Sean Danconia, Doremi, Katie Griffin, Kyle Hebert, Keiji Inafune, Yoshitaka Kawaguchi, Reki Kawahara, Mary Long, Comfort Love, Eru Matsumoto, Vic Mignogna, Kazuma Miki, Masahiko Minami, Stephanie Morgenstern, Masakazu Morita, Toby Proctor, Susan Roman, Ron Rubin, Yoshiki Sakurai, Keith Silverstein, Michael Sinterniklaas, John Stocker, Sushio, Eiko Tanaka, Tasha, Luna Tsukigami, Kimura U, Gen Urobuchi, Adam Withers, Yutaka Yamamoto, abec, Fuminori Kizaki, Ami Koshimizu, Kazuki Nakashima, Eiji Ohtsuka, Lunatic Joker, Uki Satake, Yosuke Toba, and Ryoka Yuzuki.
July 2–5, 2015	Los Angeles Convention Center; Los Angeles, California	90,500 (unique); 260,700 (turnstile)	Bennett Abara, Sho Aikawa, Aimer, Dino Andrade, Mashiro Ayano, Christopher Ayres, Aza, Bosshi, Chocolate Covered Cosplay, Danny Choo, Olivia Chubear, Robbie Daymond, Ben Diskin, Dustbunny, Sandy Fox, Yuichi Fukushima, Futange, Tiffany Grant, Alexander "Octopimp" Gross, Yumiri Hanamori, HappiLeeErin, Isuna Hasekura, Kyle Hebert, Itaru Hinoue, Naoto Hirooka, Mel Hoppe, Hori, IA, Hiroyuki Imaishi, Keiji Inafune, Daisuke Ishiwatari, Atsuhiro Iwakami, Taliesin Jaffe, Miles Jai, Junnyan, Kamitani, Ayako Kawasumi, Kiba, Kiss, Kazutaka Kodaka, Hikaru Kondo, Tomoyo Kurosawa, Brooke "Dodger" Lawson, Linda Le, Cherami Leigh, Comfort Love, Toshio Maeda, Azusa Maxima, Takahiro Miura, Masanori Miyake, Momoiro Clover Z, Shinichi Nakamura, Tomonori Ochikoshi, Chicchai Ossan, Thomas Romain, Garnet Runestar, Ryukishi07, Christopher Sabat, Chii Sakurabi, Shella Santa Maria, Sean Schemmel, Stephanie Sheh, Shinya, Tomonori Sudo, Julietta Suzuki, Yoko Takahashi, Eiko Tanaka, LeSean Thomas, Naokatsu Tsuda, Luna Tsukigami, Kimura U, Cristina Vee, WagakkiBand, Sylar Warren, Lisle Wilkerson, Adam Withers, Yamatogawa, Yoshifumi Yarimizu, Miki Yoshikawa, Koki Yoshimune, and Yoh Yoshinari.
July 1–4, 2016	Los Angeles Convention Center; Los Angeles, California	100,420 (unique); 304,799 (turnstile)	Bennett Abara, Aicosu, Yoshitaka Amano, Chika Anzai, Eir Aoi, Ari Arad, Naoshi Arakawa, Ayakashi, Bamboo, Beau Billingslea, Steve Blum, Justin Briner, Christine Marie Cabanos, Chalk Twins, Chocolate Covered Cosplay, Danny Choo, Stella Chuu, Dancing Dolls, Robbie Daymond, Dodger, Doremi, Dustbunny, Dynamite Tommy, Melissa Fahn, Flow, Sandy Fox, Makoto Furukawa, Shigeo Hamashima, Hamo, HappiLeeErin, Joshua Hart, Luna Haruna, DJ HeavyGrinder, Mel Hoppe, Kenji Horikawa, Daisuke Ichikawa, Koji Igarashi, Keiji Inafune, Yoko Ishida, Akira Itsuki, Miles Jai, JAM Project, Junnyan, Jyunya, Tetsuya Kakihara, Kazue Kato, Shoji Kawamori, DJ Kazu, Kiba, Shuichi Kobayashi, Shigeto Koyama, Minami Kuribayashi, Reo Kurosu, Yuro Kyoya, Lauren Landa, Wendee Lee, Lia, Mary Elizabeth McGlynn, Erica Mendez, Michi, Masahiko Minami, Yasuo Miyakawa, Masanori Miyake, Yu Mizokami, momoMc, Tatsuyuki Nagai, NaPaTa, Shingo Natsume, Tomonori Ochikoshi, Octopimp, Hiroshi Ogawa, Okayado, Oldcodex, Tony Oliver, QueersPlay, Garnet Runestar, Christopher Sabat, Shunsuke Saito, Saitom, Nobukazu Sakai (nbkz), Sakira, Nami Sano, Takumi Sano, Erect Sawaru, Sayori, Stephanie Sheh, Makoto Shinkai, Mayumi Shintani, Nao Shirahane (DMYO), Michael Sinterniklaas, Sphere, Sushio, Junichi Suwabe, T.M.Revolution, Nobuyuki Takahashi, Tasha, TeddyLoid, Luna Tsukigami, Kazuya Tsurumaki, Kotaro Uchikoshi, Masuo Ueda, LeeAnna Vamp, Cristina Vee, Steff Von Schweetz, Akira Yasuda, Yo, Mai Yoneyama, Koki Yoshimune, ZUN, and Aqours.
July 1–4, 2017	Los Angeles Convention Center; Los Angeles, California	107,658 (unique); 357,178 (turnstile)	Ali Project, Angela, Mashiro Ayano, Gregg Berger, Beau Billingslea, Steve Blum, Kimberly Brooks, Rodger Bumpass, Zach Callison, Minori Chihara, Charlet Chung, Stella Chuu, Jonny Cruz, Robbie Daymond, Debi Derryberry, Jessica DiCicco, Michaela Dietz, Jason Douglas, Barbara Dunkelman, Dustbunny, Paul Eiding, Melissa Fahn, Maile Flanagan, GARNiDELiA, Barbara Goodson, Todd Haberkorn, Deedee Magno Hall, Erika Harlacher, Kyle Hebert, Itaru Hinoue, Takafumi Hori, Yui Horie, Ryo Horikawa, Richard Horvitz, Xanthe Huynh, Mari Iijima, Mitsuhisa Ishikawa, Yui Ishikawa, Atsuhiro Iwakami, Sunao Katabuchi, Ayako Kawasumi, Kiba, Tetsuya Kinoshita, Shigeto Koyama, Shizuka Kurosaki, Amanda "AmaLee" Lee, Erica Lindbeck, Ralph Lister, Mary Elizabeth McGlynn, Misty/Chronexia, Max Mittelman, Xander Mobus, momoMc, Cassandra Lee Morris, Kazuto Nakazawa, Sohei Niikawa, Jeff Nimoy, Tensai Okamura, Tony Oliver, Brina Palencia, QueersPlay, Ram Rider, Nicki Rapp, Nicolas Roye, Christopher Sabat, William Salyers, Tara Sands, Sean Schemmel, Tomokazu Seki, Keith Silverstein, Rikki Simons, Paul St. Peter, Konomi Suzuki, Catherine Taber, Fred Tatasciore, Courtenay Taylor, TeddyLoid, Kirk Thornton, Tsunku, Yoshihiko Umakoshi, Long Vo, Steff Von Schweetz, Kari Wahlgren, Hiromi Wakabayashi, Ezra Weisz, Yoh Yoshinari, Tsukuda Yuto, and Steven Zakari.
July 4–8, 2018	Los Angeles Convention Center; Los Angeles, California	110,000 (unique); 350,000 (turnstile)	Aimer, AKB48, Aqours, Christine Auten, Anjali Bhimani, Justin Briner, Kimberly Brooks, Rodger Bumpass, Zach Callison, Ray Chase, Colleen Clinkenbeard, Robbie Daymond, Michaela Dietz, Patricia Duran, Estelle, Melissa Fahn, Maile Flanagan, Todd Haberkorn, Deedee Magno Hall, Yui Horie, Kenji Horikawa, Richard Horvitz, Masashi Ishihama, Tomohiko Ishii, Kyle Jones, Yuki Kajiura, Katsumi Kawaguchi, Ayako Kawasumi, Josh Keaton, Hiroki Kikuta, Seiji Kishi, Haruka Kurebayashi, Eugene Lee, Rachael Lillis, Erica Lindbeck, Yui Makino, Yoshitsugu Matsuoka, May'n, Erica Mendez, Max Mittelman, Cassandra Lee Morris, Go Nagai, Shoko Nakagawa, Shinichi Nakamura, None Like Joshua, Mari Okada, Jason Paige, Bryce Papenbrook, QueersPlay, Carolina Ravassa, Tara Sands, Sayori, Sayuri, Yosuke Shiokawa, Keith Silverstein, Rikki Simons, John Swasey, TeddyLoid, LeSean Thomas, Kirk Thornton, Naokatsu Tsuda, Kotaro Uchikoshi, David Vincent, Steff Von Schweetz, Hiromi Wakabayashi, and Akira Yasuda.
July 3–7, 2019	Los Angeles Convention Center; Los Angeles, California	350,000 (turnstile est.)	Shingo Adachi, Aimi, Aqours, Anjali Bhimani, Edward Bosco, Ray Chase, Sean Chiplock, Robbie Daymond, Ricco Fajardo, Yuichi Fukushima, Bonnie Gordon, Kohei Hattori, Kyle Hebert, Rachelle Heger, Hiroyuki Imaishi, Kaye Cosplay, Shigeto Koyama, Yusuke Kozaki, Lauren Landa, Cherami Leigh, Jamie Marchi, Mona Marshall, David Matranga, Rica Matsumoto, Kyle McCarley, Marin M. Miller, Masahiko Minami, Max Mittelman, Phil Mizuno, Xander Mobus, Cassandra Lee Morris, Range Murata, Kaori Nazuka, None Like Joshua, Manabu Ono, Lisa Ortiz, Katsuhiro Otomo, The Pillowcases, Laura Post, Jamieson Price, Carolina Ravassa, Bill Rogers, Yoshiyuki Sadamoto, Sayori, Jonah Scott, Patrick Seitz, Eric P. Sherman, Keith Silverstein, Michael Sinterniklaas, Karen Strassman, TiA, Kotaro Uchikoshi, and Hiromi Wakabayashi.
July 4–5, 2020	Online convention		
July 3–4, 2021	Online convention		
July 1–4, 2022	Los Angeles Convention Center; Los Angeles, California	320,000 (turnstile est.)	Takanori Aki, Mika Akitaka, The Anime Man, Anjali Bhimani, Anthony Bowling, Kira Buckland, Ray Chase, Amber Lee Connors, Robbie Daymond, Ricco Fajardo, Sandy Fox, Lizzie Freeman, Diana Garnet, Tom Gibis, Gigguk, Yaya Han, Mari Iijima, Kaye Cosplay, Brianna Knickerbocker, Shigeto Koyama, Lex Lang, Elizabeth Maxwell, Adam McArthur, Daman Mills, Max Mittelman, Phil Mizuno, Jeff Nimoy, None Like Joshua, Manabu Otsuka, Kiera Please, Carolina Ravassa, Zeno Robinson, Michelle Ruff, Megan Shipman, Abby Trott, Twin Cosplay, Tow Ubukata, Natalie Van Sistine, Hiromi Wakabayashi, Howard Wang, Wally Wingert, Dan Woren, and Yoh Yoshinari.
July 1–4, 2023	Los Angeles Convention Center; Los Angeles, California	392,000 (turnstile est.)	Aicosu, Yoshitaka Amano, Miura Ayme, Ryan Bartley, Kira Buckland, Robbie Daymond, Demondice, Doremi, D.C. Douglas, Ricco Fajardo, Lizzie Freeman, Adam Gibbs, Caitlin Glass, Natalie Rose Hoover, Carl Gustav Horn, Hiroyuki Imaishi, Neil Kaplan, Toshihiro Kawamoto, Ayako Kawasumi, Christina Marie Kelly, Makoto Kimura, Aika Kobayashi, Chiaki Kobayashi, Kazutaka Kodaka, Shigeto Koyama, Yusuke Kozaki, Anjali Kunapaneni, Gabe Kunda, Aleks Le, Alan Lee, Erica Lindbeck, Masao Maruyama, Faye Mata, Adam McArthur, Kayleigh McKee, Mega64, Daman Mills, Kayli Mills, Masahiko Minami, Casey Mongillo, Masakazu Morita, NipahDUBS, Austin Osueke, Manabu Otsuka, Masahiko Otsuka, Kiera Please, Laura Post, Reika, Zeno Robinson, Arthur Romeo, Kaho Shibuya, Sushio, Kaiji Tang, Tasha, Peter Tatara, Abby Trott, UbersCosplay, Koki Uchiyama, Anne Yatco, Suzie Yeung, Takuya Eguchi, Kaori Makita, Kiyoshi Matsuda, Ryōta Ikeda, Masaya Saitō, Nobuhiro Osawa, Acky Bright, Atsushi Ohkubo, Hiroyuki Seshita, Jin, Kafka Asagiri, Kazuaki Terasawa, Kōhei Tokuoka, Kōichi Naruse, Kotaro Takata, Takayuki Hirao, Yoko Taro, YOSHIKI, Natsuki Hanae, Moe Kahara, Takumi Hashimoto, Ryōta Hasegawa, Mayu Sagara, Sayuri Date, Kazuya Yamashita, Hirotaka Kobayashi, Satoshi Kada, Shinya Sumi, Kyōhei Yaguchi, and Satoshi Ōnishi.
July 4–7, 2024	Los Angeles Convention Center; Los Angeles, California	407,000 (turnstile est.)	AllieCat, The Anime Man, Griffin Burns, Mori Calliope, Ray Chase, Shoya Chiba, Cowbutt Crunchies, Robbie Daymond, Brian Donovan, D.C. Douglas, Junya Enoki, Doug Erholtz, Lizzie Freeman, Yuichi Fukushima, Tom Gibis, Gigguk, Caitlin Glass, Kellen Goff, Tiffany Gordon, Kyle Hebert, Naoto Hirooka, Mara Junot, Shoji Kawamori, Ayako Kawasumi, Akari Kito, Brianna Knickerbocker, Lauren Landa, Jackie Lastra, Brittany Lauda, Amanda "AmaLee" Lee, Erica Lindbeck, Faye Mata, Brandon McInnis, Daman Mills, Kayli Mills, Max Mittelman, Xander Mobus, Shoko Nakagawa, Neon Nash, Nobuhiko Okamoto, Rumi Okubo, OR3O, Kiera Please, Steve Prince, David "Docjazz4" Ramos, RinRin Doll, Zeno Robinson, Matthew David Rudd, Ryukishi07, Alejandro Saab, Patrick Seitz, Kaho Shibuya, Matt Shipman, Keith Silverstein, Juliet Simmons, Peter Tatara, Chris Tergliafera, Kirk Thornton, Kazuki Ura, Cristina Vee, David Vincent, Howard Wang, Yoshihiro Watanabe, Stephanie Yanez, Cory Yee, Suzie Yeung, Michael Yurchak, and Arryn Zech.
July 3–6, 2025	Los Angeles Convention Center; Los Angeles, California	410,000 (turnstile est.)	Zach Aguilar, The Anime Man, Ben Balmaceda, Britt Baron, Ryan Bartley, Bryson Baugus, A.J. Beckles, Dawn M. Bennett, John Bentley, Berry, Justin Briner, Kira Buckland, Griffin Burns, Bill Butts, Adam Christopher, Greg Chun, Allegra Clark, Amber Lee Connors, Brittany Cox, Hayden Daviau, Junya Enoki, David Errigo Jr., Ricco Fajardo, Flow, Stephen Fu, Makoto Furukawa, Xanthe Huynh, Hiroyuki Imaishi, Arthell Isom, Johnny Junkers, Ayako Kawasumi, Carrie Keranen, Baku Kinoshita, Kirilee, Hiroshi Kitadani, Brianna Knickerbocker, Chiaki Kobayashi, Shigeto Koyama, Tomoyo Kurosawa, Aleks Le, Amanda "AmaLee" Lee, Wendee Lee, Emi Lo, Lynzee Loveridge, Luluko, Faye Mata, Adam McArthur, Landon McDonald, Erica Mendez, Kayli Mills, Max Mittelman, Seiji Mizushima, Xander Mobus, Cassandra Lee Morris, Yuki Nakashima, Sarah Natochenny, None Like Joshua, Megumi Ogata, Naohiro Ogata, Manabu Otsuka, RinRin Doll, Zeno Robinson, Michelle Rojas, Michelle Ruff, Ryukishi07, Alejandro Saab, Sakurazaka46, Yasuto Sasada, Patrick Seitz, Justin Sevakis, Kaho Shibuya, Keith Silverstein, Sam Slade, Evil Ted Smith, Nazeeh Tarsha, J. Michael Tatum, Togenashi Togeari, Abby Trott, Kazuya Tsurumaki, Kazuki Ura, Cristina Vee, David Vincent, Hiromi Wakabayashi, Howard Wang, Yoshihiro Watanabe, Briana White, Akira Yamaoka, Anne Yatco, Cory Yee, Caleb Yen, Suzie Yeung, and Naoki Yoshida.
July 2–5, 2026	Los Angeles Convention Center; Los Angeles, California	420,000 (turnstile est.)	Kengo Abe, Zach Aguilar, Yoshitaka Amano, Miura Ayme, Ben Balmaceda, Britt Baron, Ryan Bartley, A.J. Beckles, Johnny Yong Bosch, Acky Bright, Paul Castro Jr., Clifford Chapin, Chikkupea, Hayden Daviau, Robbie Daymond, Dessi-Desu, D.C. Douglas, Junya Enoki, Kevin Frane, Yuichi Fukushima, Makoto Furukawa, Caitlin Glass, Kellen Goff, Zachary Gordon, Damien Haas, Chris Hackney, Shuhei Handa, Saori Hayami, Itaru Hinoue, Takaaki Hirakawa, Motonobu Hori, Xanthe Huynh, Yoshiaki Iwasaki, Jacki Jing, Kenji Kamiyama, Yoko Kanno, karory, Ayako Kawasumi, Kaye Cosplay, Brianna Knickerbocker, Kazutaka Kodaka, Takushi Koide, Anjali Kunapaneni, Gabe Kunda, kz (livetune), Lex Lang, Aleks Le, Amanda "AmaLee" Lee, Wendee Lee, Erica Lindbeck, Emi Lo, Machico, Faye Mata, Adam McArthur, Kyle McCarley, Kristen McGuire, Brandon McInnis, Max Mittelman, Xander Mobus, Moe↗Age!, Masakazu Morita, Cassandra Lee Morris, Shihori Nakane, Sohei Niikawa, None Like Joshua, Steve "Warky" Nunez, Miho Okasaki, Tony Oliver, Hachioji P, Bryce Papenbrook, Laura Post, RinRin Doll, Zeno Robinson, Mallorie Rodak, Rosuuri, Michelle Ruff, Alejandro Saab, Keith Silverstein, Sam Slade, Spyair, Laura Stahl, Rie Takahashi, Yoko Takahashi, Moriyasu Taniguchi, TeddyLoid, Kirk Thornton, Alexis Tipton, Abby Trott, Twinfools, Koki Uchiyama, Kana Ueda, V!CE, Joshua Waters, Anne Yatco, Suzie Yeung, Jenny Yokobori, and Keita Yoshinobu.
July 2–5, 2027	Los Angeles Convention Center; Los Angeles, California		

=== Other Anime Expos ===
The SPJA twice ran conventions outside California: Anime Expo New York in 2002, and Anime Expo Tokyo in 2004.

==== Anime Expo New York ====
Anime Expo New York (AXNY) was held in 2002 in the Times Square district of New York City, New York. The event was originally a joint effort with Central Park Media and its industry event, Big Apple Anime Fest (BAAF). Due to differences, the event ran as separate entities within the same time frame and venues, with BAAF hosting the theatrical film screenings, and Anime Expo New York hosting the convention. The events shared some resources, with notable guests listed in the program guides of both events. The SPJA ran the event in order to demonstrate that it could run events outside its home state of California. The event was a precursor to Anime Expo Tokyo which ran in Tokyo, Japan in 2004. The SPJA has not run any events outside California since 2004.

===== Convention locations =====
Dates	Location	Atten.	Guests
August 31 – September 2, 2002	Marriott New York Marquis; New York, New York	5,500	Akitaroh Daichi, Noboru Ishiguro, Yoko Kanno, Toshihiro Kawamoto, Takao Koyama, Taro Maki, Chris McKay, Koji Sugiura, Atsushi Takeuchi, Yoshiyuki Tomino, and Shinichiro Watanabe.

==== Anime Expo Tokyo ====
Anime Expo Tokyo (AX Tokyo) was held in 2004 at the Sunshine City Convention Center in Ikebukuro, Tokyo, Japan. It was not technically organized directly by the SPJA, but rather was organized by the Japanese Association for Science Fiction International Communication (www.jasfic.or.jp)(JASFIC) with assistance from the SPJA. JASFIC had two goals for Anime Expo Tokyo. The first goal was to establish in Japan a non-corporate-sponsored convention dedicated to anime. The second goal was to demonstrate to the organizers of the World Science Fiction Convention (WorldCon) that Japan could serve as a suitable venue for conventions that attract foreigners. Although Anime Expo Tokyo did not go on to a second year, JASFIC was ultimately successful in attracting the 65th World Science Fiction Convention to Japan in 2007.

Anime Expo Tokyo had a list of over 40 guests such as manga artist Ken Akamatsu, MiQ, Under17, Hiroshi Aro, and many others, although a small handful had to make last-minute cancellations. Anime Expo Tokyo was also the very first Anime Expo that officially hosted guests from the U.S. anime industry such as webcomic artist Fred Gallagher and voice actor Crispin Freeman.

Of Anime Expo Tokyo's 4,249 attendees, approximately 300 of that number were estimated to have traveled from abroad. In addition to the attendance numbers were 240 members of the press, 40 of whom were from overseas. An additional 430 people were composed of dealers, guests, or staff.

No plans to host another official Anime Expo outside California have been announced.

===== Convention locations =====
Dates	Location	Atten.	Guests
January 16–18, 2004	Sunshine City Convention Center; Tokyo, Japan	4,919	Sho Aikawa, Ken Akamatsu, Hiroshi Aro, Crispin Freeman, Fred Gallagher, Yuichi Hasegawa, Saki Hijiri, Ryusuke Hikawa, Hiroyuki Imaishi, Imaitoonz, Isamu Imakake, Mutsumi Inomata, Noboru Ishiguro, Mitsuhisa Ishikawa, Takehiko Ito, Yutaka Izubuchi, Toshihiro Kawamoto, Hiroyuki Kitazume, Satomi Kodama, Rie Kugimiya, Akira Kushida, Tomomi Michizuki, MIQ, Nao Nagasawa, Hiroshi Negishi, Tetsuya Nishio, Hiroyuki Okiura, Romi Park, Akemi Takada, Nozomu Tamaki, Kana Ueda, Under17, Yoshihiro Yonezawa, and Reina Yoshimura.

==== Anime Expo Chibi ====
Anime Expo Chibi (formerly Anime Expo Ontario) is an annual two-day anime convention held during November at Ontario Convention Center in Ontario, California. Organized by Anime Expo, it is designed to be a smaller convention that focuses on the artist alley and exhibit hall. The programming has an arcade, cosplay contest, karaoke, live music, Maid Cafe, manga lounge, tabletop gaming, and workshops. In July 2026 it was announced the convention would not be held that year, but dates were announced for 2027.

===== Convention locations =====
Dates	Location	Atten.	Guests
November 12–13, 2022	Ontario Convention Center; Ontario, California		
November 11–12, 2023	Ontario Convention Center; Ontario, California		Ben Balmaceda, Sandy Fox, Chris Hackney, Brianna Knickerbocker, Mela Lee, Griffin Puatu, Zeno Robinson, Nicolas Roye, Steve Staley, Marie Westbrook, and Cory Yee.
November 9–10, 2024	Ontario Convention Center; Ontario, California		Leeanna Albanese, Beanandcheese.burrito, Berry, Bill Butts, Kimberley Anne Campbell, Paul Castro Jr., Ray Chase, Brittany Cox, Robbie Daymond, D.C. Douglas, Ricco Fajardo, Analesa Fisher, Chris Hackney, Kyle Hebert, Takaaki Hirakawa, Lauren Landa, Jackie Lastra, Wendee Lee, Faye Mata, Kyle McCarley, Kayleigh McKee, Risa Mei, Kayli Mills, Max Mittelman, Cat Protano, Keith Silverstein, Justice Slocum, Christopher Corey Smith, Chris Tergliafera, V!CE, Cristina Vee, David Vincent, and Cory Yee.
November 8–9, 2025	Ontario Convention Center; Ontario, California		Mika Akitaka, Berry, Morgan Berry, Christine Marie Cabanos, Paul Castro Jr., Sean Chiplock, SungWon Cho, Adam Christopher, Charlet Chung, D.C. Douglas, Takaaki Hirakawa, Xanthe Huynh, Brenna Larsen, Brittany Lauda, Alan Lee, Wendee Lee, Erica Lindbeck, Faye Mata, Risa Mei, Kayli Mills, Tony Oliver, Cat Protano, Andrew Russell, Matt Shipman, Sam Slade, Justice Slocum, Katy Townsend, David Vincent, Howard Wang, and Cory Yee.
October 22–24, 2027	Ontario Convention Center; Ontario, California		

=== Other conventions ===
==== Anime Conji ====
In 2010, Anime Conji began as an annual anime convention in San Diego. In 2013, it began to be run by SPJA. Anime Conji 2016 was cancelled due to event quality concerns. Anime Conji 2017 was also cancelled. The convention returned in 2018 under its original organizers, the San Diego Speculative Fiction Society (SanSFiS). Anime Conji held no event in 2020 due to financial and location problems.

== Organizational structure ==
The Society for the Promotion of Japanese Animation (SPJA), the parent organization which produces Anime Expo, is a federal and California state registered 501(c)(3) non-profit charitable organization, based out of the metro Los Angeles suburb of Corona. Before January 1, 2020, they were registered as a 501(c)(6) non-profit trade benefit organization.

== Notes ==
- The 2009 event donated over $29,000 to the Children's Hospital of Orange County (CHOC) from the SPJA Charity Auction, announced during closing ceremonies on Sunday, July 5, 2009
- Masquerade main event was attended by a standing-room-only crowd with over 7,200 seats available.
- Total 2010 through-the-doors attendance achieved 105,000 (turnstile), compared to 2009's attendance of 109,000 (turnstile). This was Anime Expo's second attendance decline since its inception.
