= Ugetsu (disambiguation) =

Ugetsu is a 1953 Japanese film by Kenji Mizoguchi.

Ugetsu may also refer to:

- Ugetsu Monogatari or Tales of Moonlight and Rain, a collection of stories by Ueda Akinari on which the film is based
- Ugetsu (album), a 1963 jazz recording by Art Blakey and the Jazz Messengers
- Ugetsu, a character in the video game Suikoden IV

== People with the given name ==
- Ugetsu Hakua (born 1970), Japanese artist
