= Anime Frontier =

Anime convention in Fort Worth, Texas

Coordinates: 32°44′56.4″N 97°19′39.72″W

- Status: Active
- Genre: Anime
- Venue: Fort Worth Convention Center
- Location: Fort Worth, Texas
- Country: United States
- Inaugurated: 2021
- Organizer: LeftField Media
- Website: animefrontier.com

Anime Frontier is an annual three-day anime convention held during December at the Fort Worth Convention Center in Fort Worth, Texas.

== Programming ==
The convention typically offers an art show, artist alley, concert, cosplay competition, dance performances, exhibit hall, swap meets, tabletop gaming, video game tournaments, and workshops.

== History ==
Anime Frontier was announced in June 2019 by LeftField Media. Anime Frontier 2020 was cancelled due to the COVID-19 pandemic. The May 2021 event was postponed to December due to the continuing COVID-19 pandemic. Crunchyroll was the primary sponsor of the 2021 event. Anime Frontier's December event had COVID-19 protocols including proof of vaccination and mask requirements. The convention continued to have COVID-19 protocols in 2022. Artist Alley expanded by 50% in 2023.

=== Event history ===
Dates	Location	Atten.	Guests
December 3–5, 2021	Fort Worth Convention Center; Fort Worth, Texas	13,000	Zach Aguilar, Tia Ballard, Ray Chase, Colleen Clinkenbeard, Robbie Daymond, Barbara Dunkelman, Kara Eberle, Samantha Inoue-Harte, Samantha Ireland, Lindsay Jones, Aleks Le, Amanda "AmaLee" Lee, Eric Maruscak, Max Mittelman, A New World, Bryce Papenbrook, Podgekinn, Anairis Quiñones, Zeno Robinson, Justin Rojas, Christopher Sabat, Sean Schemmel, and Arryn Zech.
December 3–5, 2022	Fort Worth Convention Center; Fort Worth, Texas	16,000	Zach Aguilar, AlpacaAsh, Johnny Yong Bosch, Ray Chase, Stella Chuu, Zack Davisson, Robbie Daymond, Flow, The Geeky Seamstress, Dawn H., Ryan Colt Levy, Adam McArthur, Mike McFarland, Max Mittelman, Lindsay Seidel, Sarah Wiedenheft, Anne Yatco, and Suzie Yeung.
December 8-10, 2023	Fort Worth Convention Center; Fort Worth, Texas		Steve Blum, Mori Calliope, Ray Chase, Robbie Daymond, Marisa Duran, Ricco Fajardo, Maile Flanagan, Caitlin Glass, Takanashi Kiara, Max Mittelman, Zeno Robinson, Alejandro Saab, Chiwa Saito, Jonah Scott, Eric Vale, Dan Woren, Hoshimachi Suisei, and Acky Bright.
December 6-8, 2024	Fort Worth Convention Center; Fort Worth, Texas		Ben Balmaceda, Katelyn Barr, Ray Chase, CutiePieSensei, Zack Davisson, Robbie Daymond, Kôhei Eguchi, Damien Haas, Emi Lo, Landon McDonald, Max Mittelman, Stephanie Nadolny, Lexi Nieto, Trina Nishimura, Bryce Papenbrook, Ian Sinclair, Corinne Sudberg, Kaiji Tang, Nazeeh Tarsha, J. Michael Tatum, and Hideki Yamasaki.
December 12-14, 2025	Fort Worth Convention Center; Fort Worth, Texas		Laura Bailey, Ben Balmaceda, Aaron Campbell, Stella Chuu, Robbie Daymond, Ricco Fajardo, Jill Harris, Taliesin Jaffe, Jerry Jewell, Ashley Johnson, Aleks Le, Amanda "AmaLee" Lee, Lexi Nieto, Liam O'Brien, Kureiji Ollie, Sam Riegel, Brandon Rogers, Alejandro Saab, Naoko Tsutsumi, Yuki Watanabe, Travis Willingham, and Yukana.
December 4-6, 2026	Fort Worth Convention Center; Fort Worth, Texas		Laura Bailey, Ironmouse, Taliesin Jaffe, Ashley Johnson, Matthew Mercer, Daman Mills, Madeleine Morris, Reagan Murdock, Emily Neves, Liam O'Brien, Celeste Perez, Corey Pettit, Marisha Ray, Sam Riegel, Sarah Wiedenheft, Corey Wilder, and Travis Willingham.

== See also ==
- Anime NYC, also organized by LeftField Media
