= I Offer My Manliness to You =

Japanese manga series

- First wideban volume cover

君に捧げる男前 (Kimi ni Sasageru Otokomae)
- Genre: Romantic comedy
- Manga
- Written by: Fuminosuke
- Published by: Comic Smart (digital); ASCII Media Works (print)
- English publisher: NA: Mangamo
- Imprint: Sylph Comics
- Magazine: Ganma!
- Original run: August 17, 2023 – present
- Volumes: 3
- Television drama
- Directed by: Haruku
- Written by: Maika
- Studio: Gokko Club
- Original run: May 22, 2024 – February 15, 2025
- Episodes: 51

I Offer My Manliness to You (Japanese: 君に捧げる男前, Hepburn: Kimi ni Sasageru Otokomae) is a Japanese manga series written and illustrated by Fuminosuke. It began serialization on Comic Smart's Ganma! manga service in August 2023. A live-action short drama adaptation aired 23 episodes in May 2024. A second season aired 28 episodes in February 2025.

== Media ==
=== Manga ===
Written and illustrated by Fuminosuke, I Offer My Manliness to You began serialization on Comic Smart's Ganma! manga service on August 17, 2023. ASCII Media Works has collected the series' chapters into three wideban volumes as of June 2025.

During their panel at Anime NYC 2025, Mangamo announced that they had licensed the series for English publication.

No.	Release date	ISBN
1	May 22, 2024	978-4-04-915768-0
2	November 22, 2024	978-4-04-916134-2
3	June 20, 2025	978-4-04-916545-6

=== Short drama ===
A live-action short drama adaptation premiered nine episodes on the Ganma! TikTok account on May 22, 2024. The remaining fourteen episodes would air on the Bump streaming service on May 30. A second season aired 28 episodes on Gokko Club's Popcorn streaming service on February 15, 2025.

== Reception ==
The series was nominated for the tenth and eleventh Next Manga Awards in 2024 and 2025, respectively, in the web category.
