= Acky Bright =

Japanese artist, character designer, and illustrator

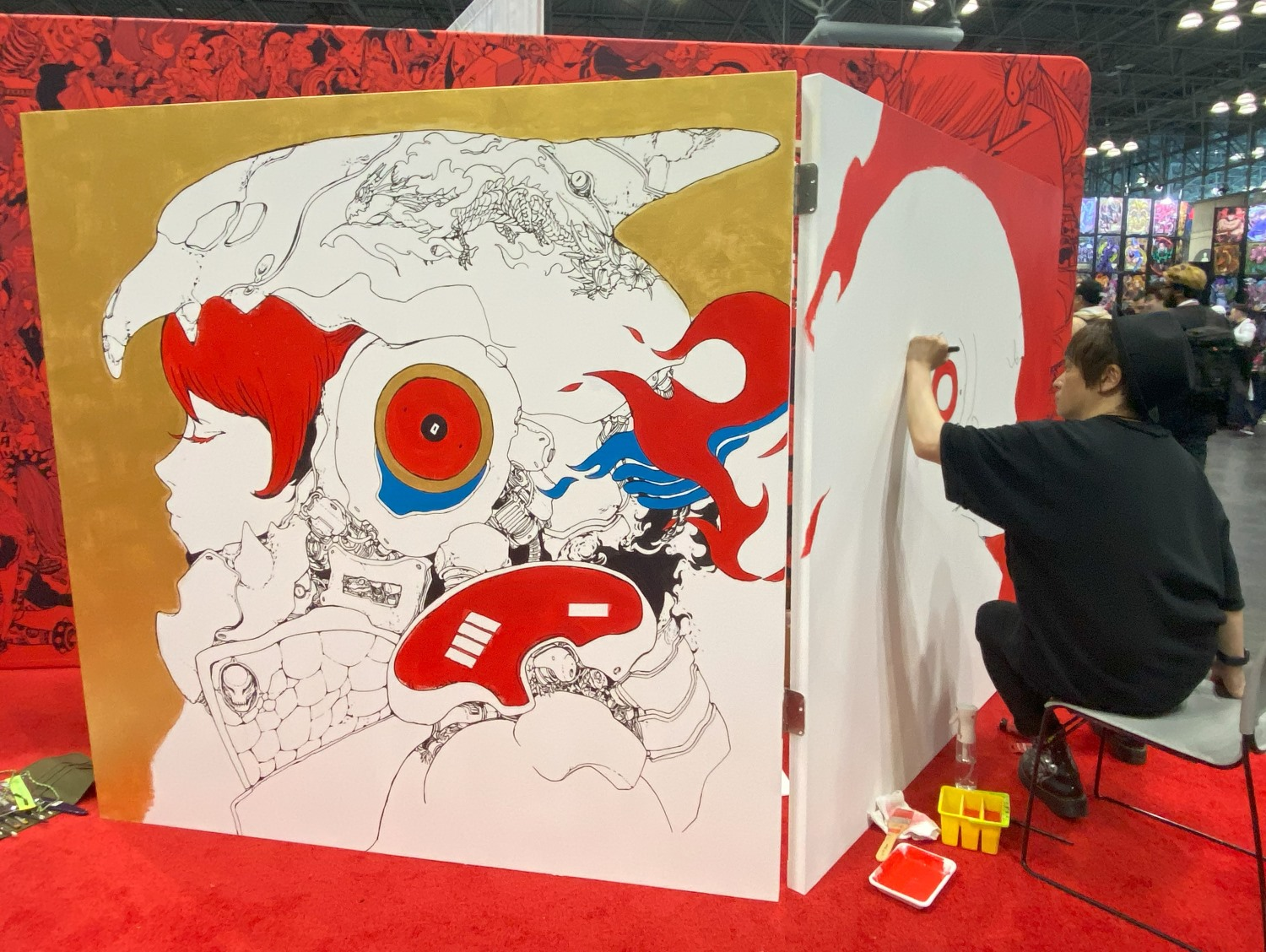
- Acky Bright live drawing performance at Anime NYC 2023
- Known for: character design, illustration, manga, comic book cover art
- Notable work: DC Comics, McDonald's, Meta, BMW, Artbook "B/W"
- Website: acky-bright.com

Acky Bright is a Japanese manga artist, illustrator, and character designer. His work has been featured in several art books, art exhibitions, comic books, and international promotion campaigns for major companies such as Hasbro, DC Comics, BMW, McDonald's, Meta, and Netflix.

He has been a featured guest at multiple anime, comic book, and pop culture events in Japan, the United States, and China, where he has gained attention for his large-scale live drawings. In 2023, his first commercial art book B/W was published by PIE International.

== Career ==
=== 2017-2020: Social media and Transformers ===
Bright is a self-taught visual artist who began by creating graphic designs. In 2017, he began posting small-scale drawings on social media. Bright later worked at a design company which created conservative commercial work.

In 2020, he began posting his work under the name "Acky Bright". In June 2020, Hasbro Pulse released an official Transformers T-shirt design created by Bright.

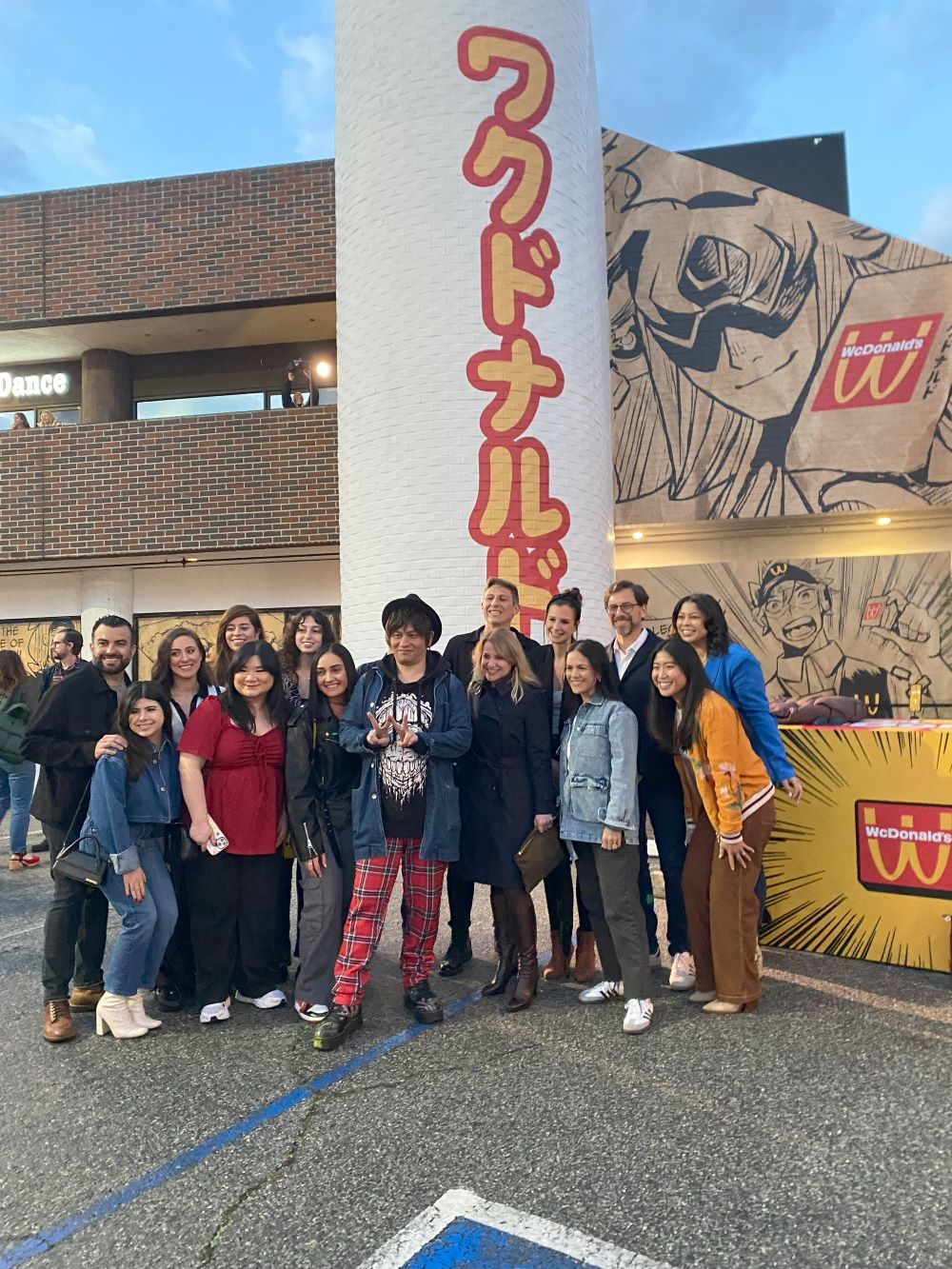
Acky Bright poses with fans at the WcDonald's immersive experience in Los Angeles, March 2024.

=== 2021: First solo exhibition and first DC Comics cover ===
In March 2021, Bright was selected by Museum of Modern Art senior curator Paolo Antonelli to contribute art for the "Vision Gate" installation at Narita Airport, part of the Culture Gate to Japan campaign which presented multimedia art exhibitions at airports across Japan. For this project, Bright stated his work was based on the idea of creating a "theme park" energy.

In April, Bright's work was the focus of German automaker BMW's "Heroes of Rivalry" online manga project. In July, Bright designed the cover for the first issue of Terang, a special edition of the Kadokawa magazine Harta. Bright's original manga story "The Steel Bride" was published in Harta's second issue in Winter 2022.

In August, Bright's first solo exhibition "Borderline" was held at Nagoya Parco, showing black and white illustrations drawn with a single pen. In addition to over 100 hand-drawn art pieces, Bright worked on large-scale works each day during the exhibition's two week run, creating the illustrations live in front of the attendees. In September, Bright collaborated with manga and anime character designer Katsuya Terada for the "Effect 2 – Issen" dual live drawing event at Atmos Sendagaya. In October, Bright created his first cover illustration for mainstream U.S. comics, a portrait of Punchline for DC Comics' Joker #8.

=== 2022: International exhibitions, first U.S. event, DC Comics interiors ===
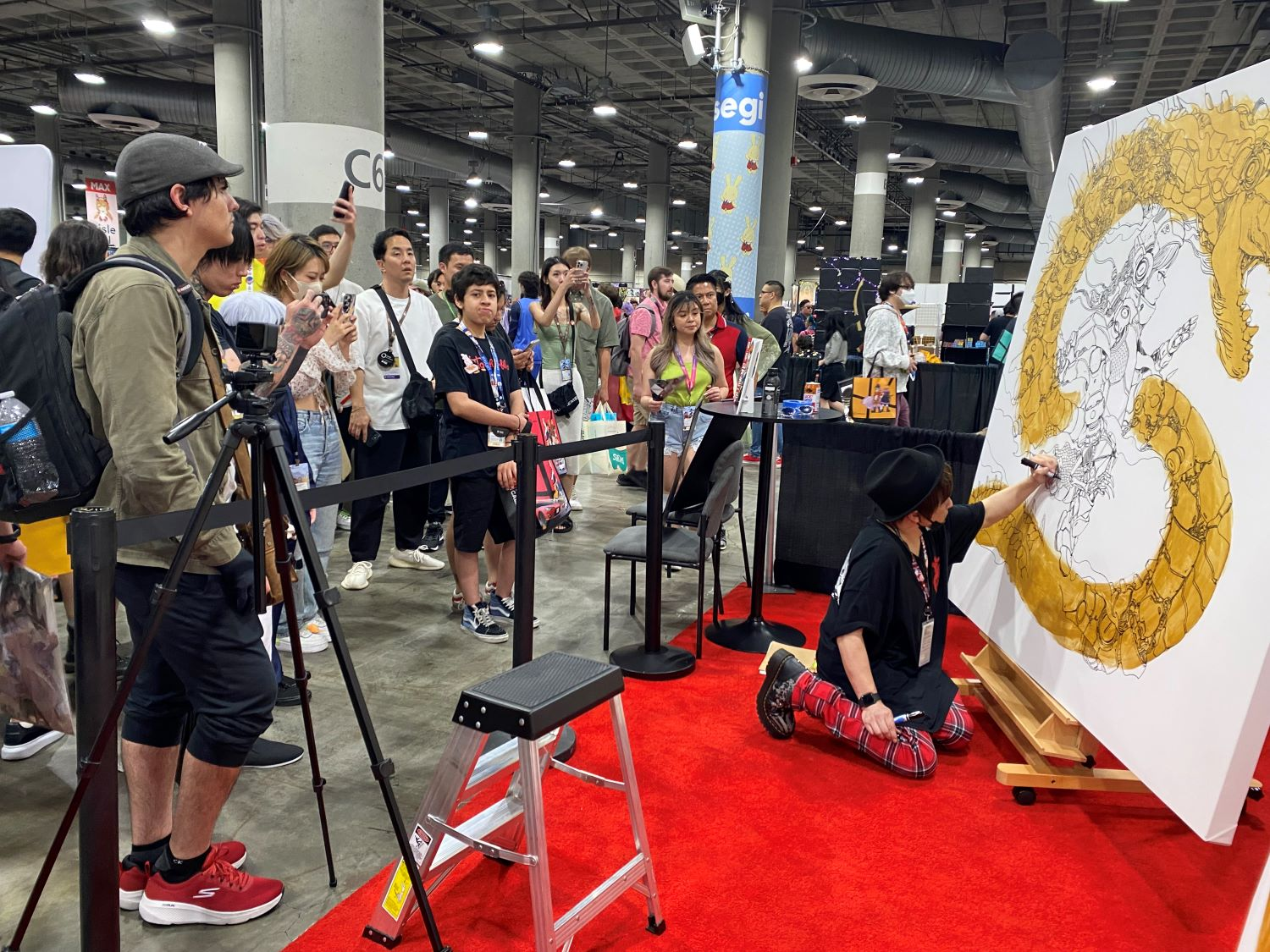
Acky Bright performs a live drawing at Anime Expo 2023 in Los Angeles.

In January 2022, Bright created a cover illustration for DC Comics' Harley Quinn comic book, followed by a cover for DC Comics' Deathstroke, Inc. comic book in March. In September, Bright designed the SIM car exterior for auto racer Ritomo Miyata. The same month, his solo exhibition titled "Kong Zhi Rong – Xian" was presented in Beijing, featuring the debut of his original character Cocon.

In October, Bright drew the interior art pages for the short story "Black Lightning: Kill the Messenger" in DC vs. Vampires: All-Out War #4, which served as his U.S. comics debut as an interior artist. In November, Bright held his second solo exhibition in Japan titled "B/W" at Gallery W in Omotesando and released his first commercial art book, also titled B/W, from Tokyo-based publisher PIE International. The same month, he performed his first live drawing event in the U.S. at Anime NYC in New York City and did a live recreation of his Harley Quinn cover at Tokyo Comic Con.

=== 2023: McDonald's, Meta, Anime Expo, Teenage Mutant Ninja Turtles ===
In January 2023, Bright created the character designs for the "Ado x Asmi – Paku" animated campaign for McDonald's Japan. In April, Bright was featured on the cover of UK digital art magazine ImagineFX along with an interview about his process of drawing in black and white.

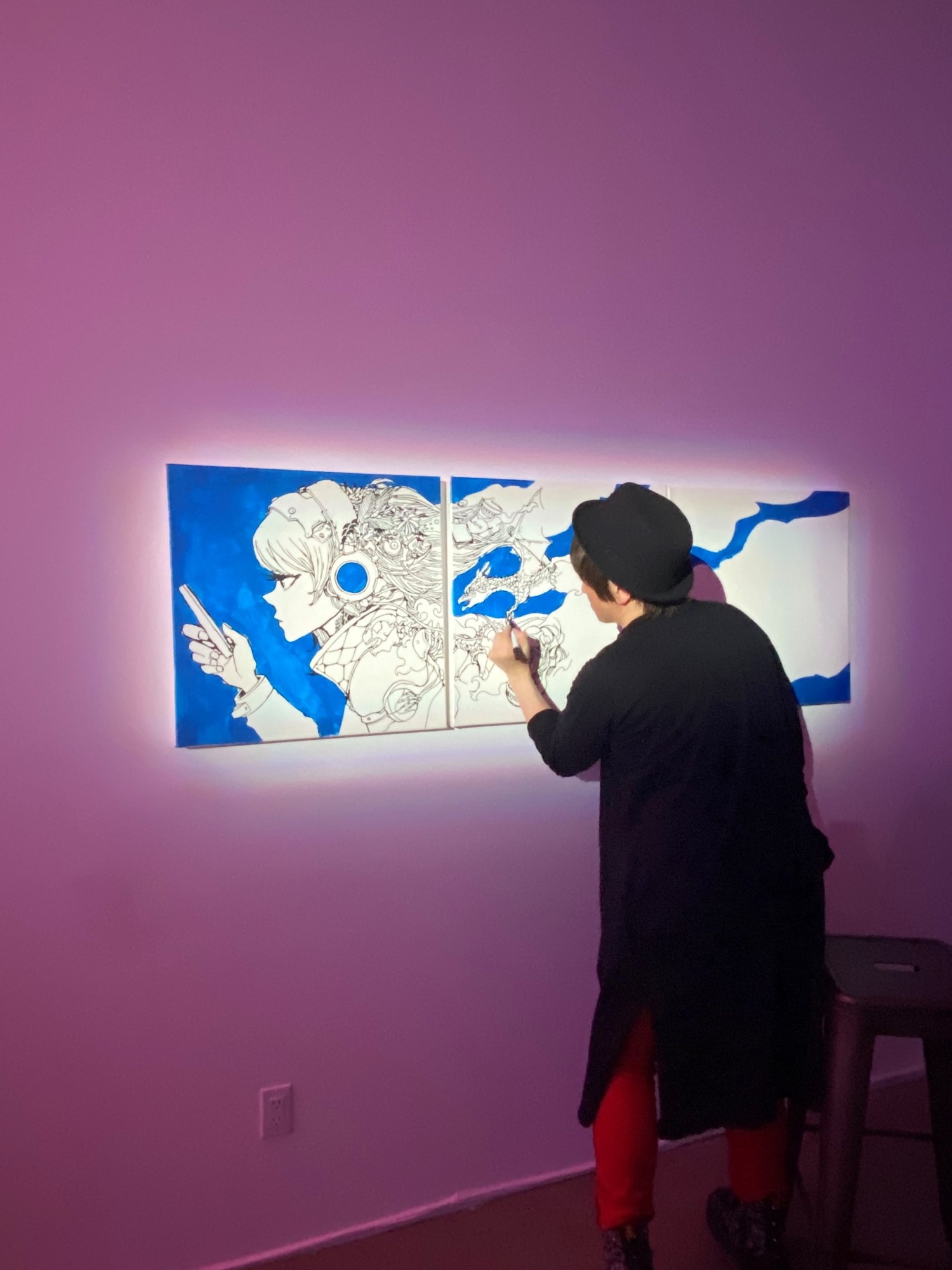
Acky Bright at Meta's "It's Your World" project launch event, July 2023.

In July, Bright performed a live drawing event at Anime Expo in Los Angeles. The same month, he created the covers and interior art pages for the DC Comics two-issue series Knight Terrors: Angel Breaker and illustrated the comic book pages for Meta's promotion campaign "It’s Your World" featuring Coi Leray. The video and animated gif stickers created for the campaign by advertising agency Droga5 were viewed more than 300 million times in the first week.

In September 2023, Bright created over 70 illustrations for the official Squid Game coloring book produced by Netflix and published by Penguin Random House. The same month, he participated in the official Batman Day 2023 project in Tokyo. In November, Bright returned to Anime NYC for a live drawing demonstration, followed by an appearance at Anime Frontier in Dallas in December. That same month, Bright created the main character image for Wonder Festival in Beijing and created the cover illustration for IDW's Teenage Mutant Ninja Turtles comic book.

=== 2024: WcDonald's campaign and New York exhibition ===
In January 2024, Bright was the main character designer for the production of a second music video for McDonald's Japan, featuring music by Japanese artists Yoasobi and Vaundy.

In February 2024, McDonald's launched a month-long anime-inspired "WcDonald's" promotion campaign in 30 territories including the U.S. and Canada which featured character designs by Bright in advertising, packaging, and anime short videos. Based on the popular substitute name for McDonald's in Japanese manga and anime, Bright created four digital manga chapters for the event spanning different genres: action, romance, mecha, and fantasy, and blended Japanese and western aesthetics. Bright produced 22 pages every week for the manga and became the first person in the world to draw the WcDonald's world in an officially endorsed product. Bright's characters and designs were also used for an "immersive dining experience" at a physical restaurant in Los Angeles.

In August 2024, Japan Society in Manhattan held a preview of Bright's first New York solo exhibition titled Acky Bright: Studio Infinity, followed by the show's official opening on October 4. The exhibit featured his live drawing murals, two new painting series, KBK-18 and Ah-Un, which draw inspiration from traditional Japanese art and theater, along with Bright's promotional work for "WcDonald's", Yoasobi x Vaundy’s "Fries Beat" music video, and Squid Game coloring book.

== Artistic style ==
Bright's favorite medium for art creation is pen and paper. Bright has a broad artistic background and adapts his style to fit different projects. "What I pay attention to here is what the story demands, what the stories' themes are whether they're romance or action."

Bright's work has been labelled "kawakakkoii" by One-Punch Man creator Yusuke Murata because of its combination of kawaii ("cute") and kakkoii ("cool") aesthetics. Bright claims to be influenced by the works of Katsuya Terada and Akira Toriyama, as well as Japanese manga from the 1980s and 1990s. In addition, Bright is influenced by American comics and graphic novels.

Bright states that he believes "the lack of color creates a blank space and allows the viewer to change the colors." He often combines the subjects of females and mechanical creations, mixing science fiction and real-world elements. "There is a lot of diversity in [female] hairstyle, body shape, makeup, fashion, etc., and the combination with machines is an interesting contrast. I thought I could combine… something tough and something soft."

== Exhibitions and live events ==
Date	Event	City
August 2021	Solo exhibition "Borderline"	Nagoya, Japan
September 2021	Live drawing "Effect 2 – Issen"	Tokyo, Japan
September 2022	Solo exhibition " Kong Zhi Rong – Xian"	Beijing, China
November 2022	Solo exhibition "B/W"	Tokyo, Japan
November 2022	Live drawing – Anime NYC	New York, New York
November 2022	Live drawing – Tokyo Comic Con	Tokyo, Japan
June 2023	Live drawing – Meta / Coi Leray	Brooklyn, New York
July 2023	Live drawing – Anime Expo	Los Angeles, California
July 2023	Live drawing – Kinokuniya Bookstore	Carrollton, Texas
September 2023	Live drawing – Batman Day	Tokyo, Japan
November 2023	Live drawing – Anime NYC	New York, New York
November 2023	Live drawing – Kinokuniya Bookstore	Carrollton, Texas
December 2023	Live drawing – Anime Frontier	Dallas, Texas
December 2023	Live drawing – Kinokuniya Bookstore	Atlanta, Georgia
December 2023	Live drawing – Archipel Caravan	Tokyo, Japan
December 2023	Live drawing – Wonder Festival	Beijing, China
October 2024 – January 2025	Solo exhibition "Acky Bright: Studio Infinity" with live drawing	New York, New York
