= Ugetsu Hakua =

Japanese illustrator

- 白亜 右月

Ugetsu Hakua (白亜 右月, Hakua Ugetsu; born August 12, 1970), is a Japanese artist best known as the conceptual character designer for Burst Angel. More recently, though, he created the main character designs for the anime The Tower of Druaga. Apart from that, he has worked on the visual novel games Magical Girl AI and Samurai Jupiter. He publishes doujinshi under the doujin circle name Yellow Tag. In 2005 he attended Anime Expo as a guest of honor.

== Works ==
=== Anime ===
- Burst Angel – Character design
- The Tower of Druaga: The Aegis of Uruk – Character design
- The Tower of Druaga: The Sword of Uruk – Character design

=== Video games ===
- Magical Girl AI – Character design
- Samurai Jupiter – Character design

=== Art books ===
Romaji Title	Japanese Title	Release Date	ISBN
Magical Girl AI (artbook set)	魔法少女アイ原画集	November 30, 2004	ISBN 4-86032-101-4
Ugetsu Hakua WORKS flamboyant	白亜右月WORKS flamboyant	April 2005	ISBN 4-8402-2986-4
