= Arthell Isom =

American animator

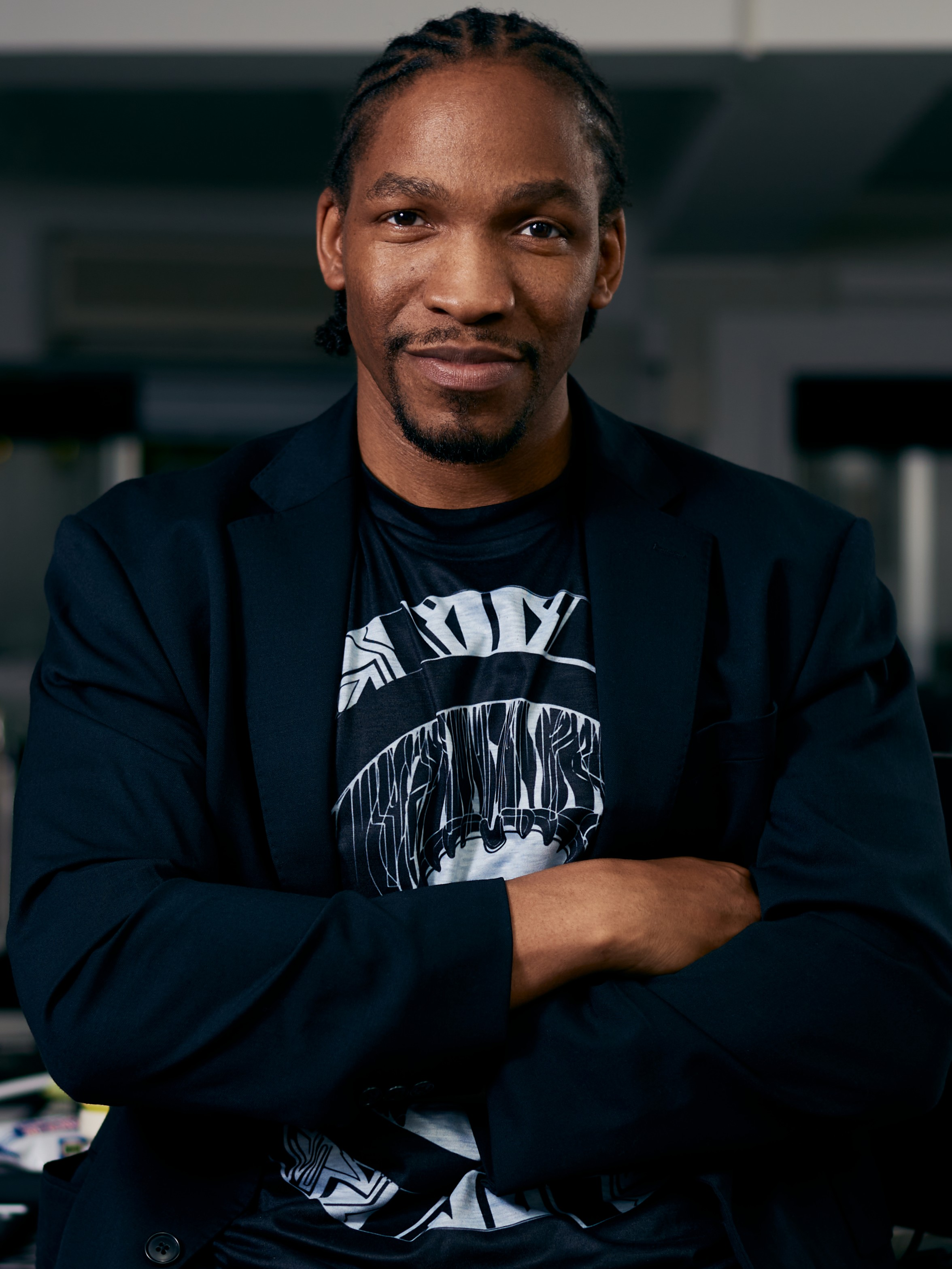
- Born: Paterson, New Jersey, U.S.
- Education: Academy of Art University; Yoyogi Animation Academy
- Occupations: Animator, background artist, art director, entrepreneur
- Years active: 2008–present
- Known for: Co-founder and CEO of D'ART Shtajio
- Notable work: Star Wars: Visions (Volume 2), One Piece, Attack on Titan, "Snowchild" (The Weeknd)

Arthell Isom is an American animator, background artist, and entrepreneur based in Tokyo, Japan. He is the co-founder, chief executive officer, and art director of D'ART Shtajio, a Tokyo-based two-dimensional animation studio he founded with his twin brother Darnell Isom and animator Henry Thurlow. Bloomberg has described D'ART Shtajio as the first Black-owned animation studio in Japan.

== Early life and education ==
Isom was raised in Paterson, New Jersey, alongside his twin brother, Darnell Isom. He attended Rosa L. Parks High School of Fine and Performing Arts in Paterson before moving to San Francisco to study at the Academy of Art University.

Isom graduated from the Academy of Art University in 2005 and moved to Japan shortly afterward. He has cited the G4 programming block Anime Unleashed, Mamoru Oshii's 1995 film Ghost in the Shell, and the work of its art director Hiromasa Ogura as influences on his decision to pursue an anime career. He spent roughly a year navigating visa and enrollment procedures before being admitted to the Yoyogi Animation Academy in Osaka, since the school did not have an established process for accepting foreign students at the time.

== Career ==
=== Ogura Kobo ===
In 2008, Isom joined Ogura Kobo, a background art studio founded by art director Hiromasa Ogura, known for his work on Ninja Scroll and Ghost in the Shell. At Ogura Kobo, Isom worked as a background artist, contributing to productions including Black Butler, Naruto Shippūden: The Lost Tower, Bleach the Movie: Hell Verse, and Lupin III: The Woman Called Fujiko Mine. Sources describe the length of his tenure at Ogura Kobo differently: some report a period of around five years, while others describe a longer stretch of roughly a decade.

=== D'ART Shtajio ===
In December 2016, Isom co-founded D'ART Shtajio in Tokyo together with his twin brother Darnell Isom and animator Henry Thurlow. The studio's name is derived from the Japanese phrase shitaji ga daiji (下地が大事, "the foundation is important") combined with the Japanese rendering of the English word "studio." Under Isom, the studio has provided background art or production work for anime series and films including Attack on Titan, One Piece, Tokyo Ghoul, and JoJo's Bizarre Adventure: Golden Wind, as well as the Netflix anthology Sturgill Simpson Presents Sound & Fury. D'ART Shtajio's animation cleanup work also appears in the fourth season of the Netflix series Castlevania. The studio has also produced animated commercials for brands including Asos.

In 2020, D'ART Shtajio produced an animated music video for "Snowchild" by The Weeknd. Trade coverage of the video's release credited Isom as director and one of its producers. In 2023, D'ART Shtajio partnered with Lucasfilm on "The Pit," a short film in the Star Wars: Visions Volume 2 anthology.

In 2017, D'ART Shtajio released Shojo no Piero ("The Doll"), an original short story about a Black expatriate engineer in Japan, featuring Dante Carver as the voice of the protagonist, Ijiro; Isom has said he originally conceived the story in college.

In 2020, Isom and his brother Darnell appeared in the music video for "Entrepreneur" by Pharrell Williams featuring Jay-Z, which highlighted Black-owned businesses.

Isom has said one aim of the studio has been to create opportunities to adapt stories by Black creators into anime, citing collaborations on independent projects such as Teflon Funk and XOGENASYS.

== Recognition and media coverage ==
Isom and D'ART Shtajio have been the subject of profiles and interviews by outlets including Bloomberg, GQ, Tokyo Weekender, Rolling Stone, and Essence. Isom was also profiled in the Hulu docuseries Your Attention Please, hosted by Craig Robinson, and appeared on the show's companion podcast. He has also appeared as a guest at anime conventions including Anime NYC.

== Personal life ==
Isom's twin brother, Darnell Isom, is a co-founder of D'ART Shtajio.

== Selected filmography ==
Year	Title	Role	Notes
2008–2010s	Black Butler	Background artist	TV series; produced during Isom's tenure at Ogura Kobo
2010	Naruto Shippūden: The Lost Tower	Background artist	Feature film; background art work during his Ogura Kobo years
2010	Bleach the Movie: Hell Verse	Background artist	Feature film; background art work during his Ogura Kobo years
2012	Lupin III: The Woman Called Fujiko Mine	Background artist	TV series; final production of his Ogura Kobo tenure
2017	Shōjo no Piero ("The Doll")	Writer, director	Original short about a Black expatriate engineer in Japan, voiced by Dante Carver; Isom has said he first conceived the story in college
2019	Sound & Fury	Background art / animation production	Netflix anime anthology film scored by musician Sturgill Simpson
2020	"Snowchild" (The Weeknd)	Director, producer	Animated music video looking back on The Weeknd's career, produced by D'ART Shtajio
2020	"Entrepreneur" (Pharrell Williams feat. Jay-Z)	Featured entrepreneur	Music video spotlighting Black-owned businesses; Isom appeared alongside his brother Darnell
2021	Castlevania (Season 4)	Animation cleanup (studio credit)	Netflix series; animation cleanup work credited to D'ART Shtajio
2022	Spotify: Feelin' Myself	Animation studio	Anime-style campaign shorts featuring Megan Thee Stallion, GloRilla, Ice Spice, and Flo Milli
2023	Star Wars: Visions ("The Pit")	Animation studio partner	D'ART Shtajio's Lucasfilm-backed short in the Star Wars: Visions Volume 2 anthology
TBA	MFINDA	Co-director	Feature film co-directed with Gisaburō Sugii; produced by N LITE with GKIDS backing, debuting at the Annecy festival
