= Anime NYC =

Annual anime convention in New York City, US

- Anime NYC logo with Crunchyroll
- Status: Active
- Genre: Anime, manga, Japanese culture
- Venue: Jacob K. Javits Convention Center
- Location: New York City
- Coordinates: 40°45′26.64″N 74°0′9.12″W
- Country: United States
- Inaugurated: 2017
- Attendance: 63,000 turnstile (est.) in 2023
- Organizer: LeftField Media
- Website: animenyc.com

Anime NYC is an annual four-day anime convention held during August at the Jacob K. Javits Convention Center in New York City.

== Programming ==
The convention typically offers arcade games, an artist alley, concerts, manga library (Carolina Manga Library), masquerade, panels, screenings, vendors, and video and card games. Anime NYC offered 100 hours of programming in 2017, which increased to more than 150 by 2024.

== History ==
Anime NYC's organizer LeftField Media was founded by the creators of New York Comic Con, and also run Washington DC's Awesome Con. New York was chosen for the event due to its lack of a large anime convention. The first Anime NYC took over a year to plan and used two halls in the convention center. In the convention's first year, they did not use the amount of space used by New York Comic Con. New York City declared an Anime NYC Weekend for the 2017 convention. Anime NYC added more floor space in 2018, with additional expansion planned in 2019. The convention also hosted Anisong World Matsuri at the Hammerstein Ballroom.

In 2019, Anime NYC used all of the Javits main event space, but did share some of the venue with a chocolate event. Artists alley was moved into the dealer's hall, which was doubled in size. New York City Councilmen Ben Kallos and Kanji Yamanouchi, Japan's UN representative both attended the event. Anime NYC 2020 was cancelled due to the COVID-19 pandemic. A virtual event was hosted by Anime NYC and NTWRK from November 17–20, 2020, as the convention's replacement.

The event returned for 2021, with all attendees required to present proof of at least partial vaccination for COVID-19 or a valid medical exemption (as required under the Key to NYC Pass health order) and wear a face covering. The convention sold out of several badge tiers prior to the event occurring and the Artists Alley was located in its own space for the first time. Registration had long wait times on Friday, with the line being several blocks long, due to a significant number of attendees arriving early. The event made entrance changes for Saturday and Sunday that largely resolved the line issues.

On December 2, 2021, Anime NYC received national media attention after reports of attendees that had tested positive for the newly-discovered Omicron variant of SARS-CoV-2 (including one that was only the second confirmed case in the United States); the variant was first reported to the World Health Organization (WHO) four days after the convention had concluded, leading to discussions over how long the variant had spread in the U.S. prior to its formal designation as a variant of concern, and if there had been further spread at the event. All attendees were urged to receive COVID-19 testing; research by the CDC published in February 2022 found that the combination of "multiple, simultaneous prevention measures" resulted in a low level of transmission, reporting a positivity rate of 2.6% (119 positive cases) out of 4,560 attendees tested.

Anime NYC in 2022 continued to have a COVID-19 policy that required vaccination or testing. A vendor was injured during load out at the end of the convention, and required hospitalization. In 2024, the convention moved to August and used the full main building of the Jacob K. Javits Convention Center. This was an increase of around 250,000 square feet in comparison to the 2023 event. The convention expanded to four days in 2025, with the addition of limited hours on Thursday. The artists alley and exhibition hall had crowding issues in 2025. Thefts occurred during the 2026 event that included cash and Pokemon cards, with several people being arrested.

== Event history ==
Dates	Location	Atten.	Guests
November 17–19, 2017	Jacob K. Javits Convention Center; New York, New York	20,000 paid (est.)	Bennett Abara, Bryson Baugus, Makoto Bessho, Christine Marie Cabanos, Danny Choo, Charlet Chung, Jonny Cruz, Robbie Daymond, Sandy Fox, Scott Gibbs, Kaz Haruna, Kate Higgins, Yoko Ishida, Kyle Jones, Naruyoshi Kikuchi, Lauren Landa, Narae Lee, Cherami Leigh, Kyle McCarley, Erica Mendez, Phil Mizuno, Chris Niosi, Masakazu Ogawa, Yuko "Aido" Ota, Hiroki Otsuka, Christopher Sabat, Shin Sasaki, Stephanie Sheh, Michael Sinterniklaas, Fumihiko Sori, Gaku Space, Masaki Tachibana, LeSean Thomas, Mike Toole, True, Uncle Yo, Cristina Vee, Chihiro Yonekura, and YuffieBunny.
November 16–18, 2018	Jacob K. Javits Convention Center; New York, New York	36,000 (est.) unique 50,000+ turnstile	Aimer, Tia Ballard, Mica Burton, Ray Chase, Danny Choo, Robbie Daymond, Toru Furuya, Kun Gao, Todd Haberkorn, Luna Haruna, Hironobu Kageyama, Brittney Karbowski, Hiroshi Kitadani, Shigeto Koyama, Linda Le, Narae Lee, Cherami Leigh, Vic Mignogna, Max Mittelman, Masakazu Morita, Morning Musume, Range Murata, Shoko Nakagawa, Shinichi Nakamura, nano, Becka Noel, Naohiro Ogata, Tony Oliver, Bryce Papenbrook, Mayumi Shintani, John Swasey, Cristina Vee, Kari Wahlgren, Hiromi Wakabayashi, David Wald, and Tyler Walker.
November 15–17, 2019	Jacob K. Javits Convention Center; New York, New York	46,000 (est.) total	Bennett Abara, Bryson Baugus, Justin Briner, James Carter Cathcart, Clifford Chapin, Ray Chase, Eunyoung Choi, Danny Choo, Zack Davisson, Robbie Daymond, Abby Denson, Maile Flanagan, Jessie James Grelle, Hilary Haag, Todd Haberkorn, Erika Harlacher, Riichiro Inagaki, Mitsuhisa Ishikawa, JAM Project, Takahiro Kimura, Michele Knotz, Rie Kugimiya, Josh Martin, Kristen McGuire, Misako Rocks!, Max Mittelman, Sarah Natochenny, Ichiro Okouchi, Rumi Okubo, Lisa Ortiz, Chris Rager, Carrie Savage, Satoshi Shiki, Atsumi Tanezaki, J. Michael Tatum, Yoshiyuki Tomino, True, VOfan, Mamoru Yokota, Zaq, Guilty Kiss, Miku Itō, Yukana, and Aoi Yūki.
November 17–20, 2020	Online convention		
November 19–21, 2021	Jacob K. Javits Convention Center; New York, New York	53,000 turnstile (est.)	Zach Aguilar, Shinji Aramaki, Ray Chase, Colleen Clinkenbeard, Amber Lee Connors, Zack Davisson, Robbie Daymond, Richard Epcar, Doug Erholtz, Ricco Fajardo, Alexander "Octopimp" Gross, Lex Lang, Aleks Le, Amanda "AmaLee" Lee, E. Jason Liebrecht, Eric Maruscak, David Matranga, Max Mittelman, Emily Neves, Tony Oliver, Bryce Papenbrook, Anairis Quiñones, Zeno Robinson, Michelle Ruff, Christopher Sabat, Sean Schemmel, Natsumi Ueki, and Robert Woodhead.
November 18–20, 2022	Jacob K. Javits Convention Center; New York, New York	55,000 turnstile (est.)	Johnny Yong Bosch, Ray Chase, Rosalie Chiang, Stella Chuu, Zack Davisson, Robbie Daymond, Kôhei Eguchi, Ricco Fajardo, Ayako Kawasumi, Shigeto Koyama, Shizuka Kurosaki, Cherami Leigh, Adam McArthur, Max Mittelman, Shuko Murase, A New World, Bryce Papenbrook, Steve Prince, Natalie Rial, Eric Roth, Michelle Ruff, Adam Savage, Yoko Shimomura, Stereo Dive Foundation, Sushio, Hiromi Wakabayashi, Kiyotaka Waki, Yoshihiro Watanabe, Wig-Wig Cosplay, Anne Yatco, Acky Bright, and Alexandros.
November 17–19, 2023	Jacob K. Javits Convention Center; New York, New York	60,000 unique 63,000 turnstile (est.)	Zach Aguilar, Kosuke Arai, Christine Marie Cabanos, Ray Chase, Jo Chen, Stella Chuu, Allegra Clark, Zack Davisson, Robbie Daymond, Shao Dow, Ricco Fajardo, Olivia Hack, Hiroyuki Imaishi, Yutaka Izubuchi, Erica Mendez, Masahiko Minami, Max Mittelman, Mori Calliope, Sarah Natochenny, Bryce Papenbrook, Laura Post, Zeno Robinson, Jonah Scott, SennaRin, David Sobolov, Abby Trott, Kazuki Ura, Cristina Vee, Hiromi Wakabayashi, Mai Yoneyama, Fuwawa and Mococo Abyssgard, Hoshimachi Suisei, Koseki Bijou, Shiori Novella, Nerissa Ravencroft, Ayunda Risu, Moona Hoshinova, Moe Kahara, Kobo Kanaeru, Pavolia Reine, Cö Shu Nie, Survive Said the Prophet, Hiroyuki Sawano, Kana Ichinose, Lynn, Atsushi Abe, Acky Bright, iRis, Haruki Ishiya, Yoshiki Kanou, Kenn, Shou Komura, and George Wada.
August 23–25, 2024	Jacob K. Javits Convention Center; New York, New York	100,000 (est.)	Laura Bailey, A.J. Beckles, Anjali Bhimani, Steve Blum, Sayuri Date, Zack Davisson, Ricco Fajardo, Toshio Furukawa, Hakos Baelz, Masashi Hamauzu, Taliesin Jaffe, Ashley Johnson, Shoji Kawamori, Masashi Kudo, Aleks Le, Yuji Matsukura, Kylie McNeill, Matthew Mercer, Max Mittelman, Ninomae Ina'nis, Liam O'Brien, Philip "Canvas" Odango, Bryce Papenbrook, Naomi Payton, Marisha Ray, Sam Riegel, Alyson Leigh Rosenfeld, Chiwa Saito, Jonah Scott, Takanashi Kiara, Abby Trott, Kana Ueda, Yoshihiro Watanabe, Scott Westerfeld, and Travis Willingham.
August 21-24, 2025	Jacob K. Javits Convention Center; New York, New York	148,000	Zach Aguilar, A.J. Beckles, Acky Bright, Griffin Burns, CDawgVA, Stella Chuu, Colleen Clinkenbeard, Maile Flanagan, Sandy Fox, Chad Hoku, May Hong, Hiroyuki Imaishi, Samantha Inoue-Harte, Ironmouse, JAM Project, Reiji Kawashima, Kureiji Ollie, Lex Lang, Aleks Le, Amanda "AmaLee" Lee, Mori Calliope, Lexi Nieto, Shannon D. Reed, Natalie Rial, Zeno Robinson, Brandon Rogers, Alejandro Saab, Christopher Sabat, Yoko Takahashi, Kaiji Tang, Abby Trott, Kenjiro Tsuda, Hiromi Wakabayashi, Jenny Yokobori, Seisuke Araki, Jacob Ayres, Kazuki Endo, Michael Green, Haga, Kengo Hanazawa, Takeru Hokazono, Hoku Props, Shinya Iino, Hiroyuki Imaishi, Kirito Iwashita, Teruaki Jitsumatsu, Kang Jiyoung, Yuji Kaku, Hiroshi Kamei, Emiri Kato, Derek Kolstad, Yuuki Kuwahara, Kenichiro Matsuda, Minetaro Mochizuki, Maria Naganawa, Shinya Ohira, Plexi Cosplay, Raisin Cosplay, Shu Sakuratani, Yu Saito, Hiroshi Seko, Akira Shimizu, Kotaro Sudo, Yuma Uchida, James Waugh, and Jane Wu.
August 20-23, 2026	Jacob K. Javits Convention Center; New York, New York		Ben Balmaceda, Johnny Yong Bosch, SungWon Cho, Zack Davisson, Abby Denson, Maile Flanagan, Damien Haas, Kaede Hondo, Ironmouse, Yusuke Kobayashi, Anjali Kunapaneni, Emi Lo, Mackenyu, Daman Mills, Misako Rocks!, Casey Mongillo, Mori Calliope, Lexi Nieto, Bryce Papenbrook, Jacob Romero, Jonah Scott, Stephanie Sheh, Taz Skylar, Konomi Suzuki, Junko Takeuchi, Miyu Tomita, Cristina Vee, Yuta Bandoh, Setsuo Itō, Yuki Kaji, Kobo Kanaeru, Wataru Katoh, Koseki Bijou, Tomori Kusunoki, Nerissa Ravencroft, Rui Tanabe, Yūto Uemura, and yama.

== Gallery ==
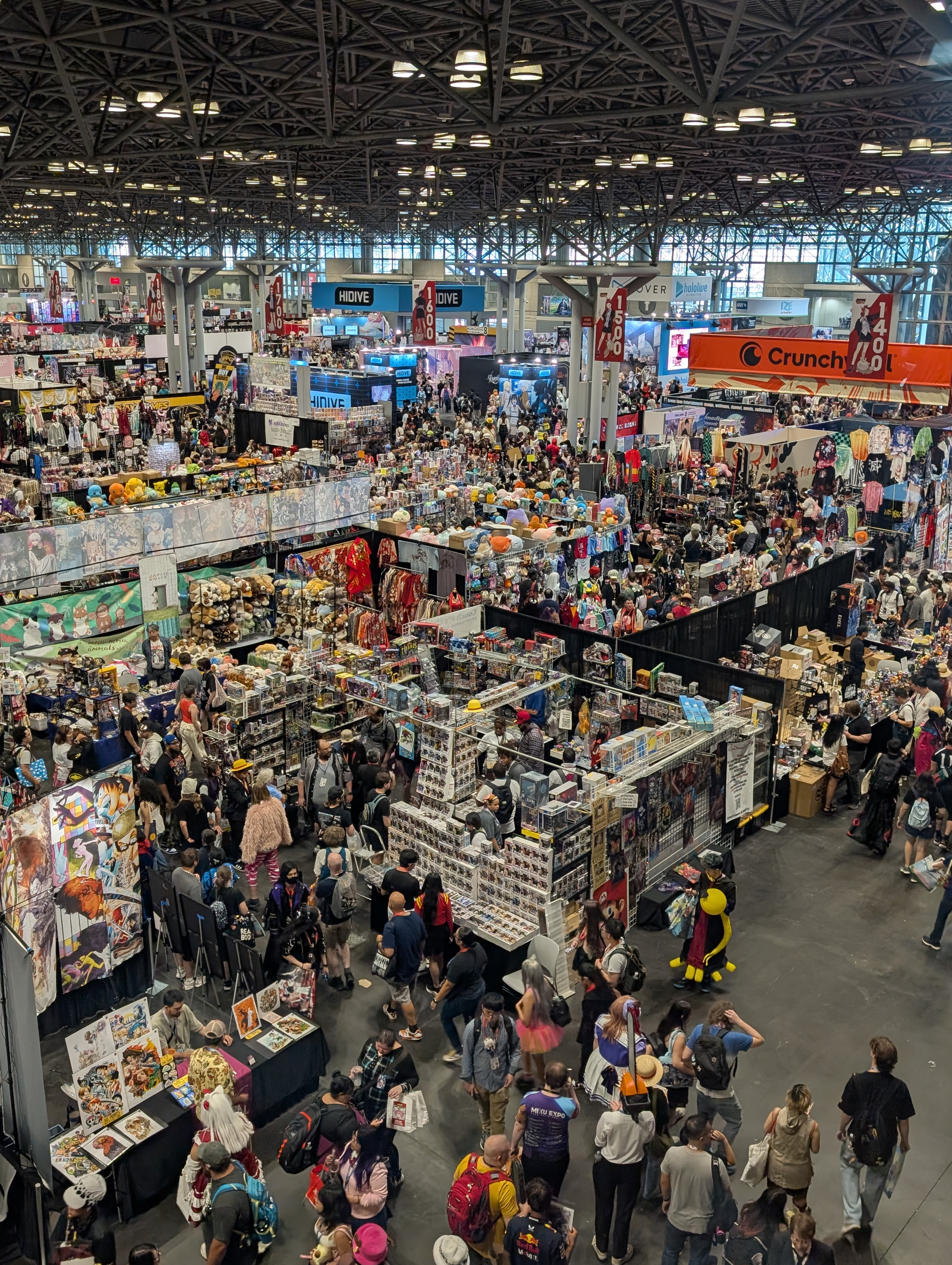
Overhead shot of the exhibition hall at Anime NYC 2025 at the Javits Center in New York City

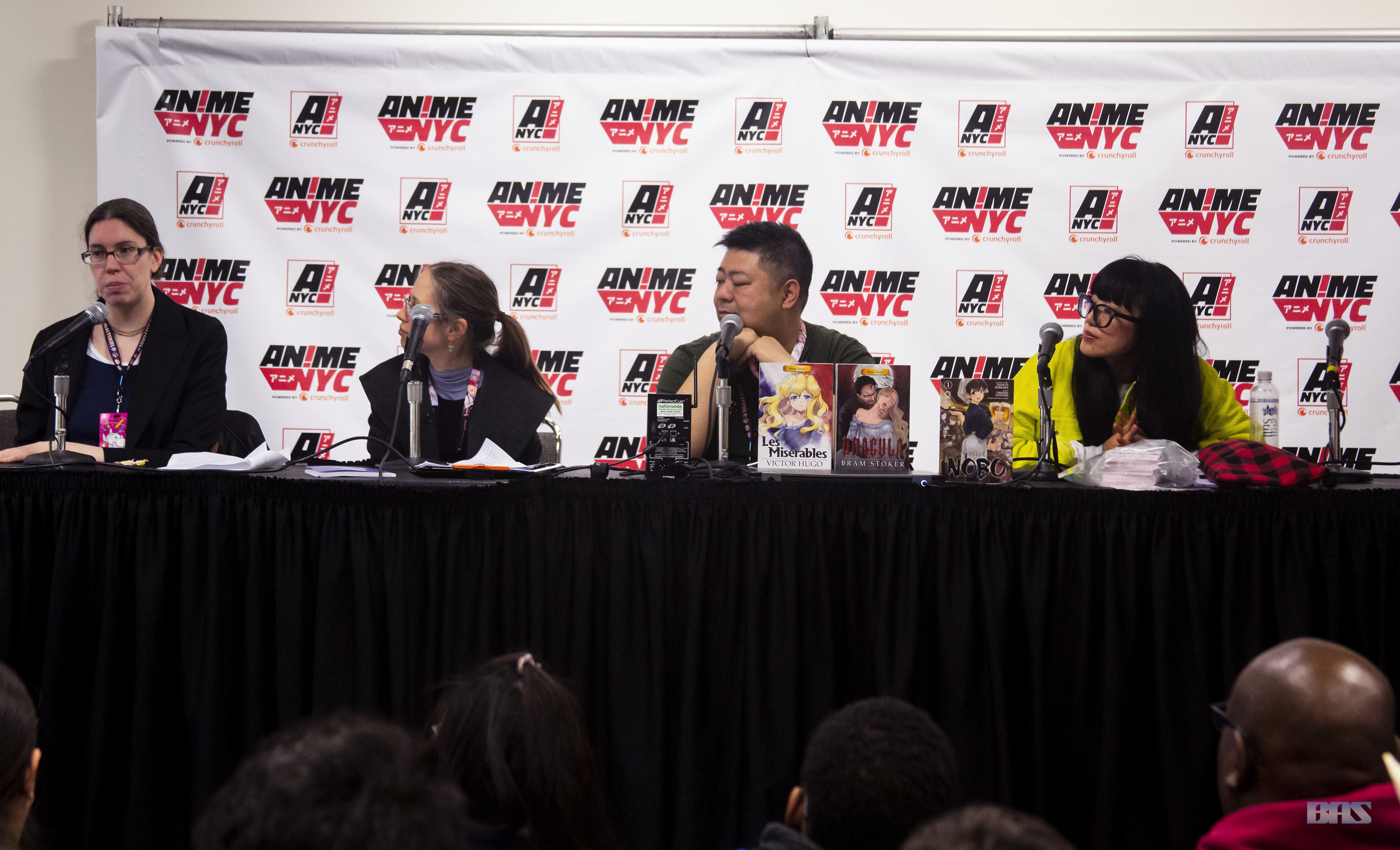
Panel session with four panelists in Anime NYC 2019

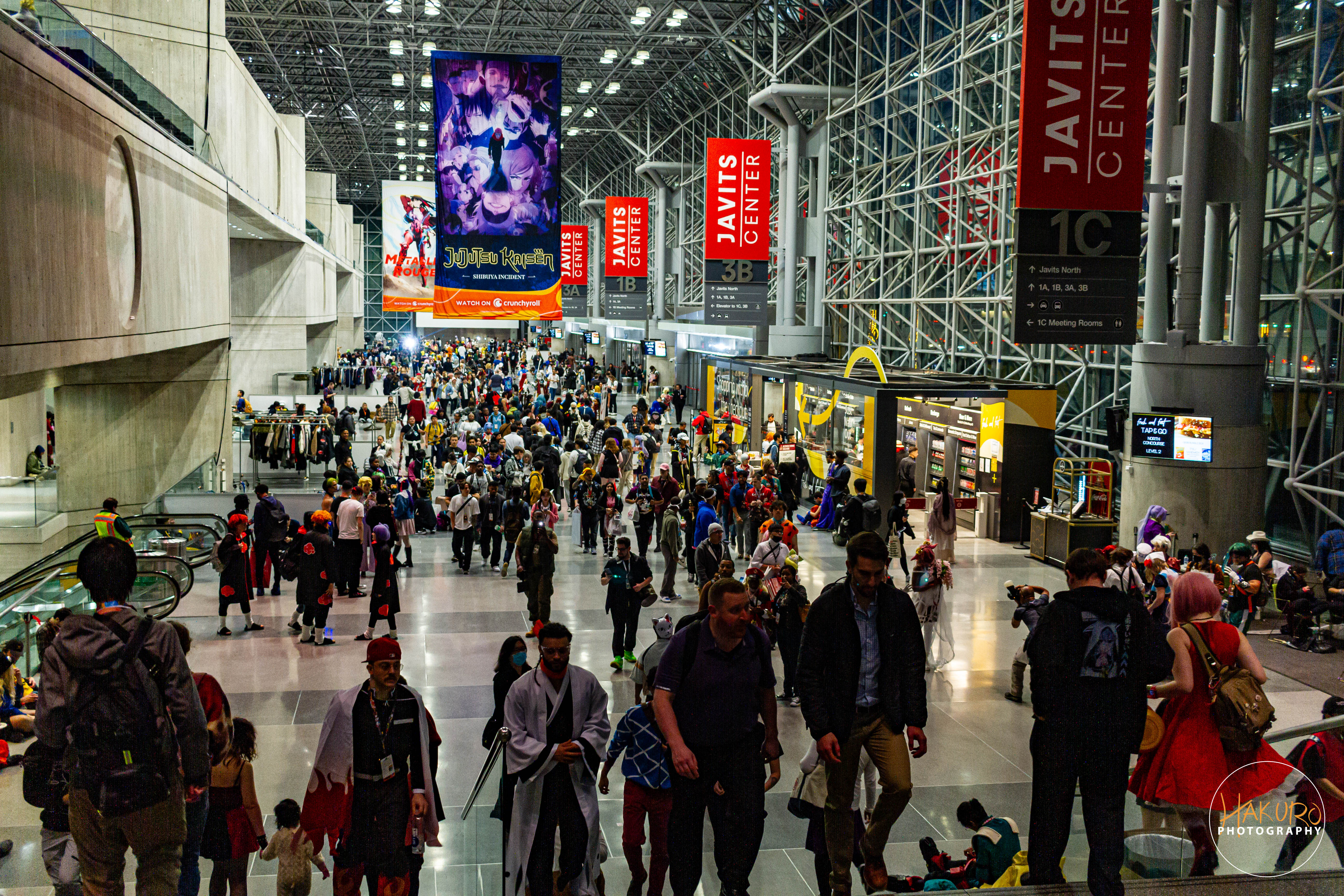
Main hallway during the convention in Anime NYC 2023

== See also ==
- Big Apple Anime Fest
- New York Anime Festival
- List of anime conventions
