= Hillsboro School District =

School district in Oregon, United States

Coordinates: 45°32′40″N 122°56′05″W

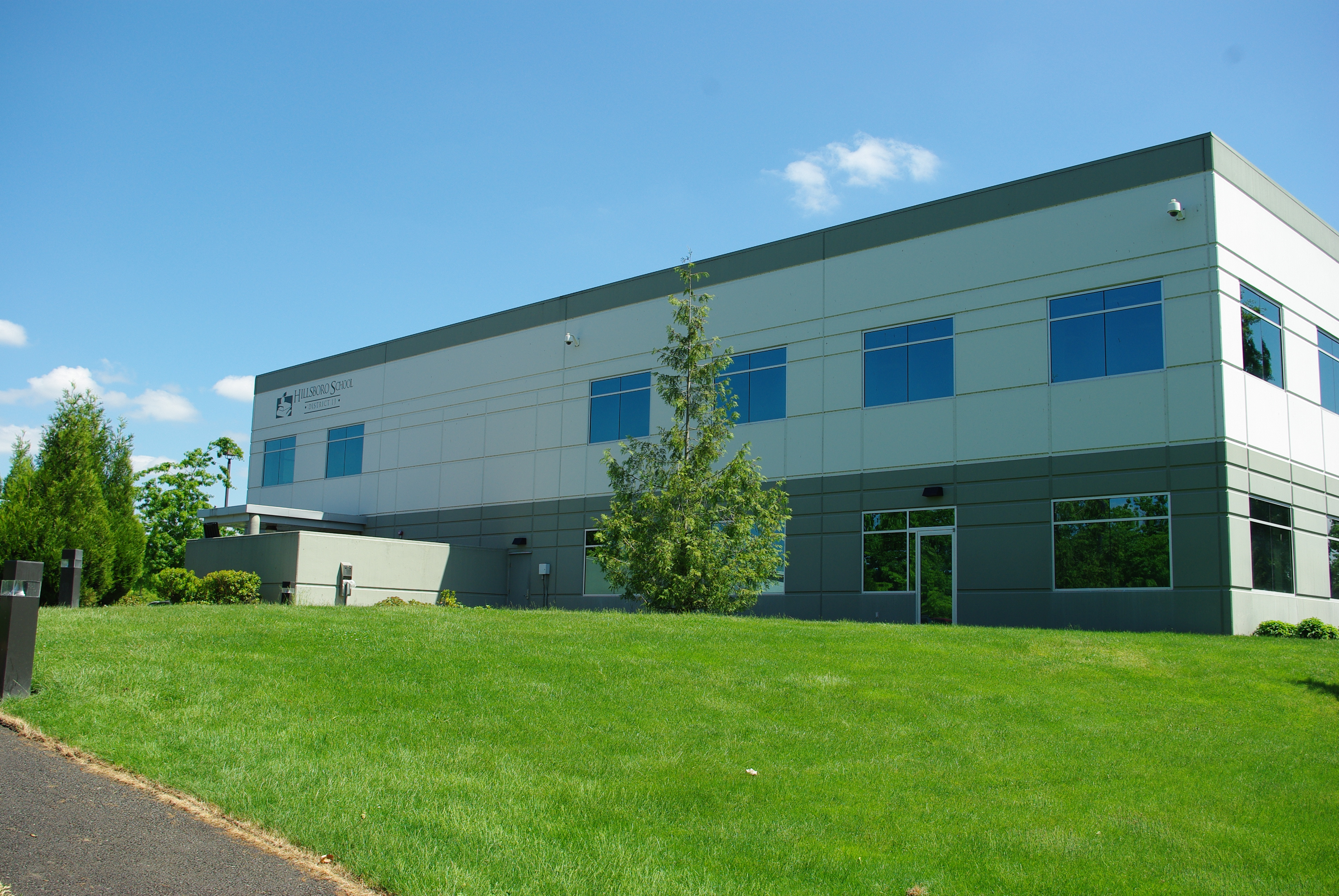
- Hillsboro School District headquarters

Location
- Washington County Greater Hillsboro, Oregon United States

District information
- Type: Public
- Grades: K–12
- Established: 1851; 175 years ago
- Superintendent: Travis Reiman
- Budget: $250,935,863

Students and staff
- Students: 20,117 (2021-22 projected)
- Teachers: 1,130
- Staff: 1,244
- Athletic conference: Metro League, Northwest Oregon Conference

Other information
- High schools: 4
- Middle schools: 4
- Elementary schools: 26
- Website: www.hsd.k12.or.us

The Hillsboro School District 1J is a unified school district located in Hillsboro, Oregon, United States. The district operates 26 elementary schools, four middle schools, and four high schools. Founded in 1851, the school district covers Hillsboro, Scholls, Reedville, North Plains, West Union, and other area communities. Total enrollment as of the 2019–2020 school year is 20,269 students, the fourth largest in the state.

The district is labeled 1J, as it absorbed the West Union School District, the first district in the county; the J (for "joint") represents that the district extends into other counties, Yamhill and Multnomah. Hillsboro's elementary schools had been District 7 prior to consolidation in 1996. The high school district was 3J and included students from grades 7 through 12, and received students from the Hillsboro elementary district and five other elementary districts.

The Hillsboro School District Board of Directors (school board) consists of seven elected members serving four-year terms. Members receive no pay for their work on the board. The district is part of the Northwest Regional Education Service District.

The district also runs a special alternative school and the Hare Field athletic complex.

== History ==
Hillsboro's first school district was formed in 1851 as School District 7. The Reverend Horace Lyman established the district and was the first commissioner, with that title later becoming school superintendent. The first school in the district was a single-room log cabin built in 1853 after a school levy was passed to raise $600 for construction. In 1875, a new frame constructed school was built, with the smaller log cabin was kept for additional space.

Map of Hillsboro and school locations as of 2008

In 1890 a new eight-room schoolhouse was finished at the present site of David Hill Elementary. In September 1908, tenth grade was added to the Hillsboro school district, with the classes held on the top floor of the school. Eleventh and twelfth grades were soon added, and in June 1911 the first students to complete four years of high school graduated. This class totaled five students, four girls and one boy. A stand-alone high school was completed by 1913, and a gymnasium was built beginning in 1915. The district overall employed a total of 19 teachers for the 1913–1914 school year.

All five of the high school teachers in the district resigned in 1914 in a dispute with management. The school board had allowed the students to vote on which teachers to retain, which the teachers resented even though all were retained in the vote. The mass walkout led to classes being canceled for a time.

The district paid high school teachers $133 per month, other teachers $125 per month, and principals $1500 per year for the 1920 to 1921 school year.

In 1929, a new high school building was finished with additional buildings and the wings added later. The neighboring Cornelius school district was dissolved in 1960, and part of their enrollment area was shifted to the Hillsboro districts, while the remainder went to the Forest Grove School District.

Brookwood Elementary was opened in 1953, followed by Poynter Junior High in 1960, then Brown Junior High and Mooberry Elementary in 1963. In May 1961, voters in all the districts feeding the high school voted on a proposal to merge into a single district. Voters decided not to merge, but the next February voters did approve merging the junior high grades into the high school district. The high school district then purchased Poynter from the elementary district for $772,566, and passed a bond measure in March 1962 to pay for that purchase, expand the school, and pay for the new junior high school that became Brown.

The district opened Hare Field in 1965, a multi-sport facility with a track, baseball stadium, and football field. In 1970, a new senior high school opened on 48 acres (190,000 m^{2}) on the south side of Hillsboro, with enrollment of the high school district reaching 3,621 students that year. The Union High School District's teachers held a three-day strike in March 1973 over their contracts, the first teacher's strike in Oregon history.

By 1987, enrollment in all the districts feeding into the high school district along with the high school district reached approximately 12,325 students. In 1987, the Union High School District began plans to unify the high school district with the six elementary districts that feed into the district's junior and senior high schools. In 1991, the Oregon Legislature passed a law requiring school districts to unify by 1996, which forced some reluctant elementary districts to unify into the Hillsboro School District. On July 1, 1996, Hillsboro Elementary, North Plains, Farmington View, Groner, Reedville, West Union, and Hillsboro Union High School districts unified into a single district, the fifth largest in Oregon at that time.

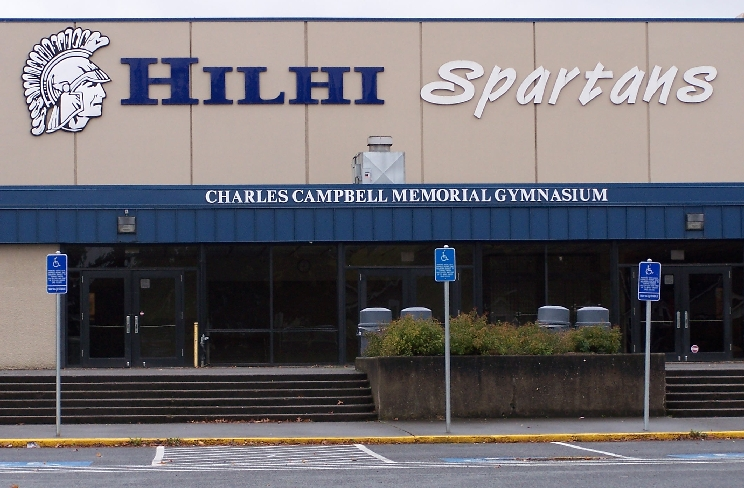
Hilhi gym

=== 21st century ===
In 2003, the district made national news when 17 days of classes were cut from the school year, which allowed students to be out in May, due to budget cuts to education in Oregon. That year enrollment reached 18,951 for the unified district.

In 2006, the district implemented a statistical tracking program that keeps track of all student information such as demographics, attendance, and academic achievement.

The district faced opposition in 2009 over the demolition of J. B. Thomas Middle School, which preservationists wanted to save for use as a community building. The district planned to tear down the old building after a 2006 bond measure approved construction of several new schools, including a new middle school and expansion at the other existing middle schools. A new elementary school was built with funds from this levy on the eastern part of Thomas' grounds, with the buildings of the old school to be torn down to make way for athletic fields. In July 2009, a court allowed the demolition to go forward.

By November 2009 the district had become the first in Oregon to use an Internet-based crisis management program to allow for easier access to information on schools by the district.

HSD purchased 40 acres (16 ha) in the South Hillsboro area in April 2014 to house a fifth high school, and, along with prior acquisitions, could add up to four elementary schools and a middle school in that area.

In 2017, a $408 million capital construction bond was passed to facilitate various projects across the district, such as renovations to school buildings, increased security measures, the construction of two new elementary schools, the creation of a fiber optic network connecting all schools, and land acquisition of new school sites.

== Boundary ==
The boundary includes most of Hillsboro, all of North Plains, and portions of Aloha, Beaverton, Cornelius, and Rockcreek.

== Schools ==
The district operates 34 schools, including four high schools, four middle schools, and 26 elementary schools. HSD also operates an alternative combined middle and high school, an online school, as well as a charter school. As of 2021, one new elementary school is under construction. Staffing includes 1,244 full-time classified employees, 1,130 full-time teachers, and 79 administrator staff members. The average student to teacher ratio is 26:1 with a 3.5% drop-out rate for the 2005 to 2006 school year. In the 2009 school year, the district had 403 students classified as homeless by the Department of Education, or 2.0% of students in the district. The annual budget is $250,935,863

=== Elementary schools & K–8 school ===
The 26 elementary schools in the district serve students in kindergarten through sixth grade, with the exception of Groner as described below.

==== Atfalati Ridge Elementary School ====
Named after the Atfalati people who originally inhabited the area, Atfalati Ridge is located on Northwest King Street in the Sunset Ridge subdivision of eastern North Plains. The two-story, 73,500 square feet (6,830 m^{2}), building opened in 2021 at a cost of $37.2 million. The school shares its floor plan with Brookwood Elementary and Tamarack Elementary, all constructed as a part of the District's 2017 bond measure. The students are known as the Blue Jays.

==== Brookwood ====
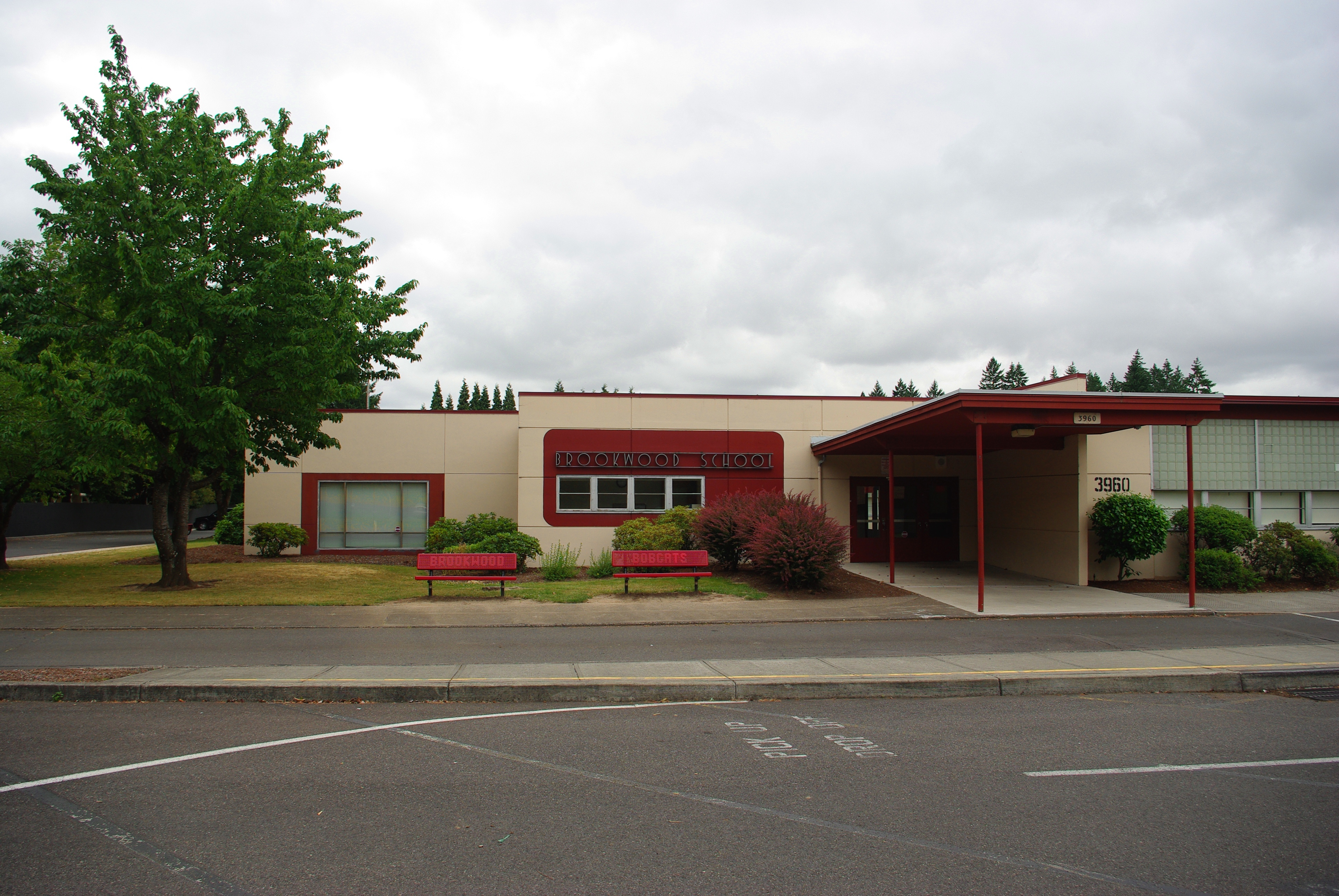
Brookwood's original building

Located in the middle portion of the city on Southeast Cedar Street, Brookwood Elementary originally opened in 1953 and was named after the area. It was the first building in the district to be built using prefabricated forms, and had to be expanded in 1957. In 2020, the original one-story building was replaced with a new two-story building at a cost of $37.6 million, nearly doubling the school's space from 40,641 square feet (3,775.7 m^{2}) of space to 73,700 square feet (6,850 m^{2}). The new building, which can house up to 600 students, features "learning areas" for group learning, a glass-enclosed "think tank", a STEM lab, an outdoor learning area, and a broadcast studio. Brookwood's new floor plan has since been used for Atfalati Ridge and Tamarack Elementary. The school's mascot is the bobcat, and enrollment is 343 students (2019-20 school year).

==== Butternut Creek ====
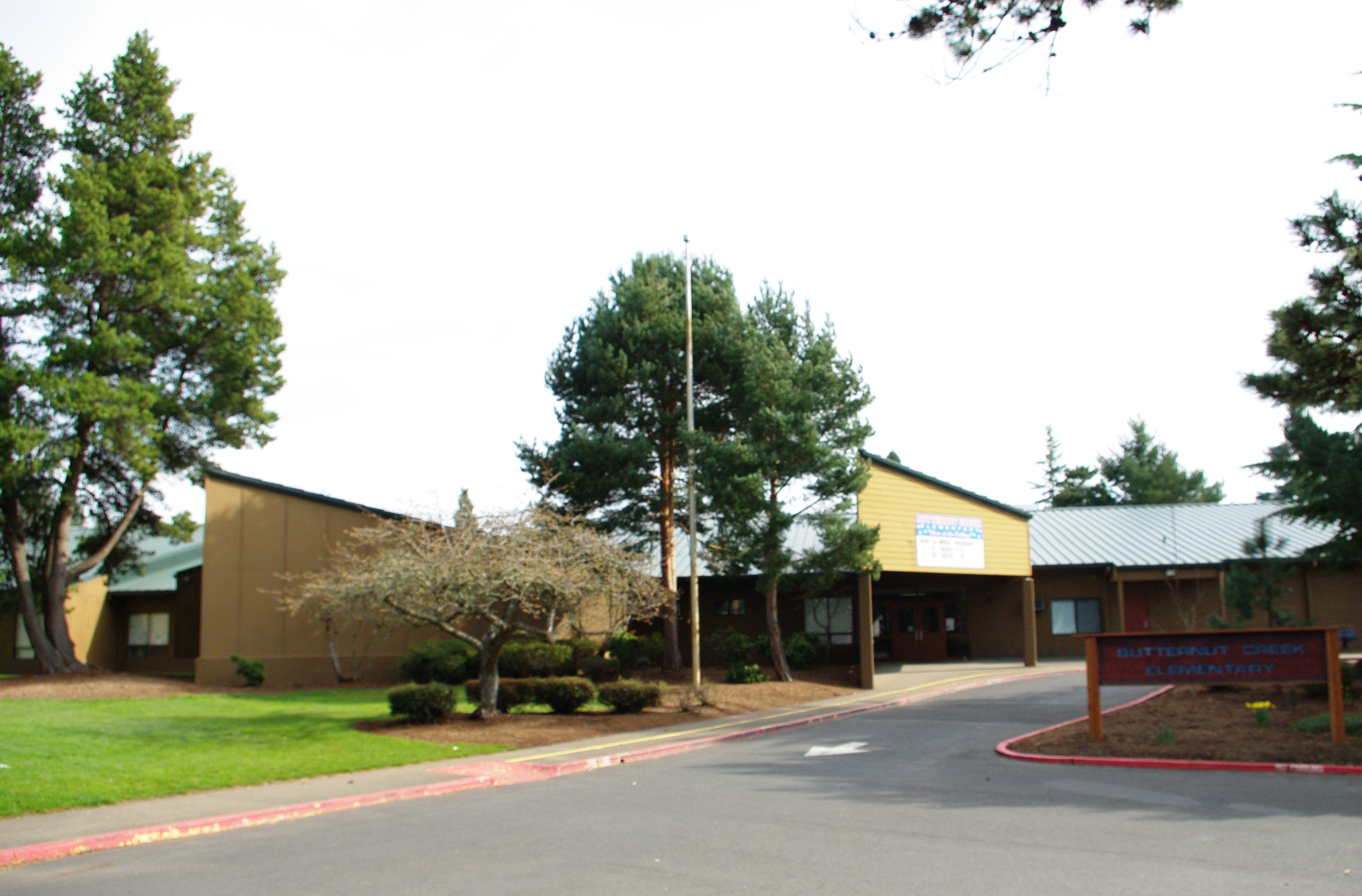
Butternut Creek

Originally part of the Reedville School District, Butternut Creek is located east of Hillsboro in Reedville. The school opened in 1977 with ten classrooms, with the students known as the Bulldogs. Butternut Creek is a single-story, wood-sided structure with a total of 42,638 square feet (3,961.2 m^{2}) of space. The school served 378 students during the 2019-20 school year and is named after the nearby creek of the same name, a tributary of the Tualatin River. In 2021, the campus went through a major renovation paid for by the 2017 construction bond, adding air conditioning, a new entry plaza, a layout change of the drop-off areas, and the construction of a new modular building with two new classrooms.

==== Eastwood ====
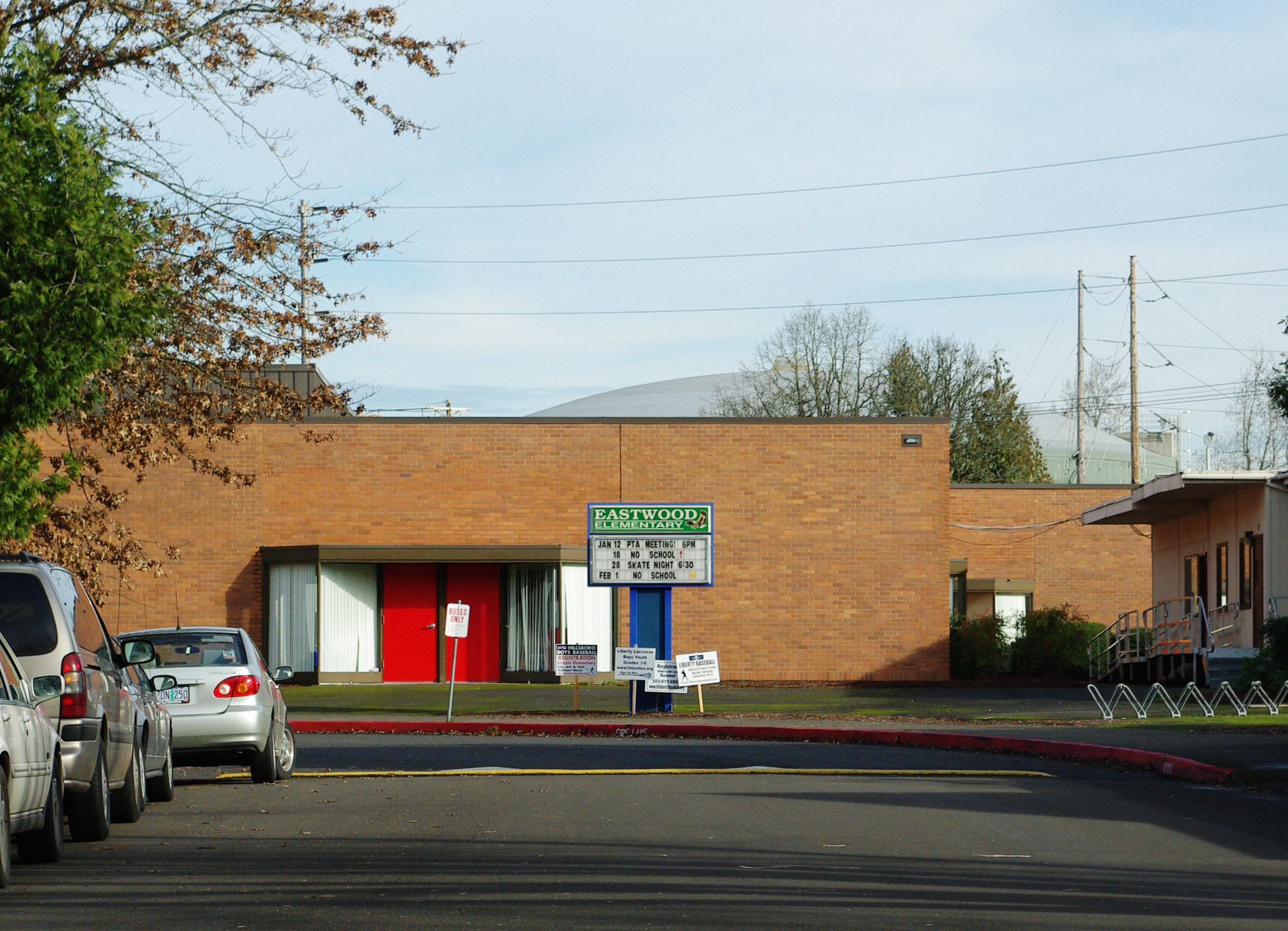
Eastwood

Home of the Eagles, the school is located in the central part of the city on Northeast Lincoln Street adjacent to Shadywood Park. The single-story building is faced with red brick and has 45,963 square feet (4,270.1 m^{2}) of space. Eastwood opened in 1978 and has a current enrollment of 435 students as of the 2019-20 school year. Renovations, funded by the 2017 bond measure, were carried out in 2019 and 2020, including a new gym, a new modular building containing 4 classrooms for the preschool housed at Eastwood's campus, a new layout of the parking lot and drop-off areas, and the addition of heating,

==== Farmington View ====
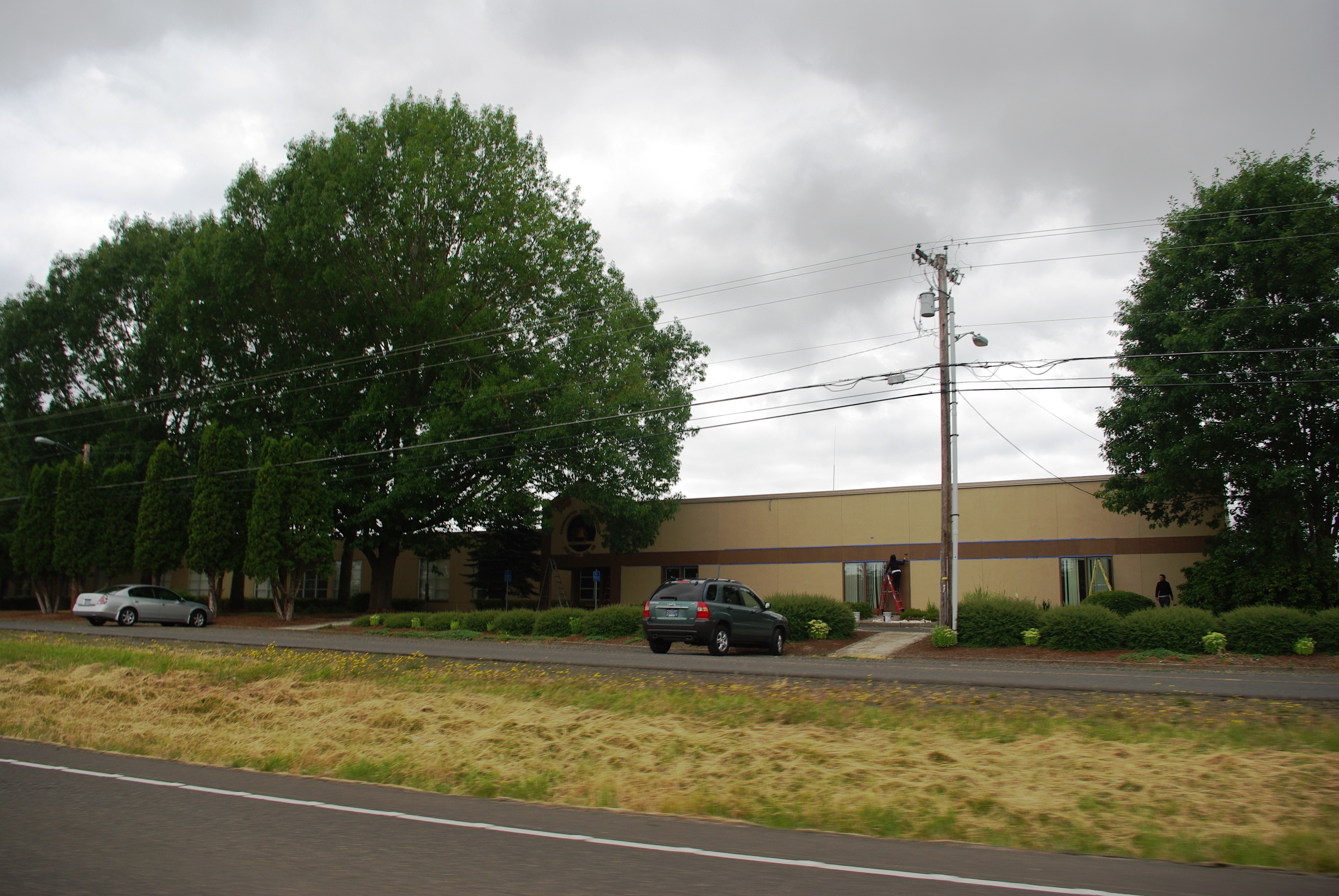
Farmington View

Opened in 1950, Farmington View was a part of its own single school district before unification in 1996. Prior to 1950 the schoolhouse for the district was in several other locations, including on Rood Bridge Road at Burkhalter Road east of the current building site. Located south of Hillsboro on Oregon Route 219, the school has an enrollment of 310 as of the 2019-20 school year, and students are known as the Bobcats. The single-story school building, has 20,467 square feet (1,901.4 m^{2}) of space. A 2017 construction bond built a new modular building containing two classrooms and a restroom on the school's campus in 2018, and renovation improvements were carried out in 2021 including to the layout of the drop-off area and the addition of air conditioning.

==== Free Orchards ====
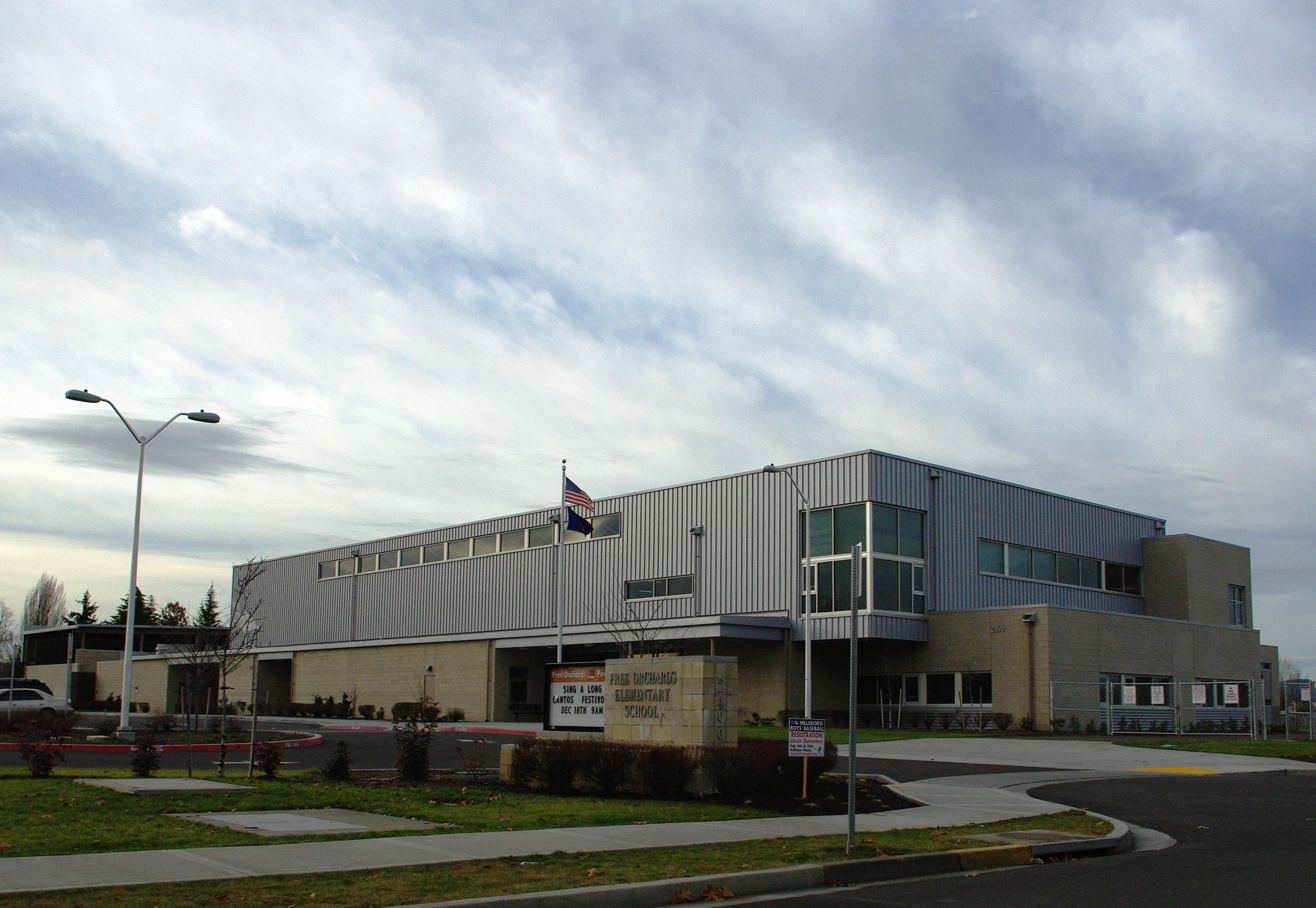
Free Orchards

Located in the neighboring city of Cornelius to the west of Hillsboro, Free Orchards is named for the original name of Cornelius. The school is on the eastern edge of the Cornelius on the south side of TV Highway (Baseline Street). Home to the Foxes, the school opened in September 2008 and has an enrollment of 365 as of the 2019-20 school year. The two-story building was paid for by a 2006 bond measure.

==== Groner ====
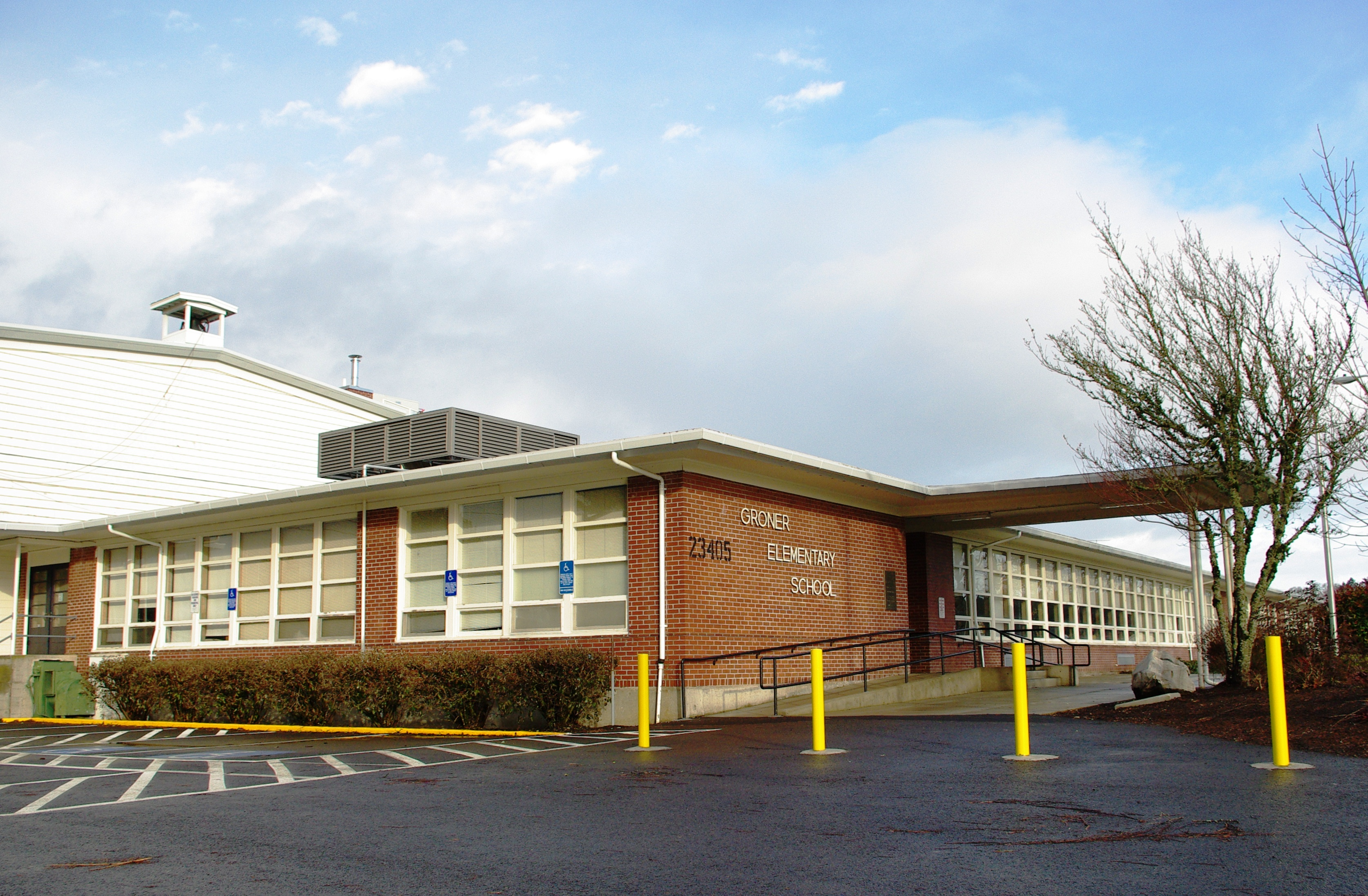
Groner

Originally the only school in the independent Groner School District, the school opened in 1949 and was merged into the Hillsboro district in 1996. The Groner district was created by a merger of the schools for the communities of Midway, Jacktown, Mountainside, and Groner south of Hillsboro in 1946. The current school consists of three single-story structures, with one also having a basement, and two having a brick veneer. In all, the school has 32,402 square feet (3,010.2 m^{2}) of space.

Part of the enrollment area of the school was proposed to be transferred to the Beaverton School District in 2010. Located in the community of Scholls along Oregon Route 210, Groner has 204 students (as of the 2019-20 school year), known as the Grizzlies. In 2015, the district converted Groner to a K-8 school that started with the 2015-2016 school year.

==== W. L. Henry ====
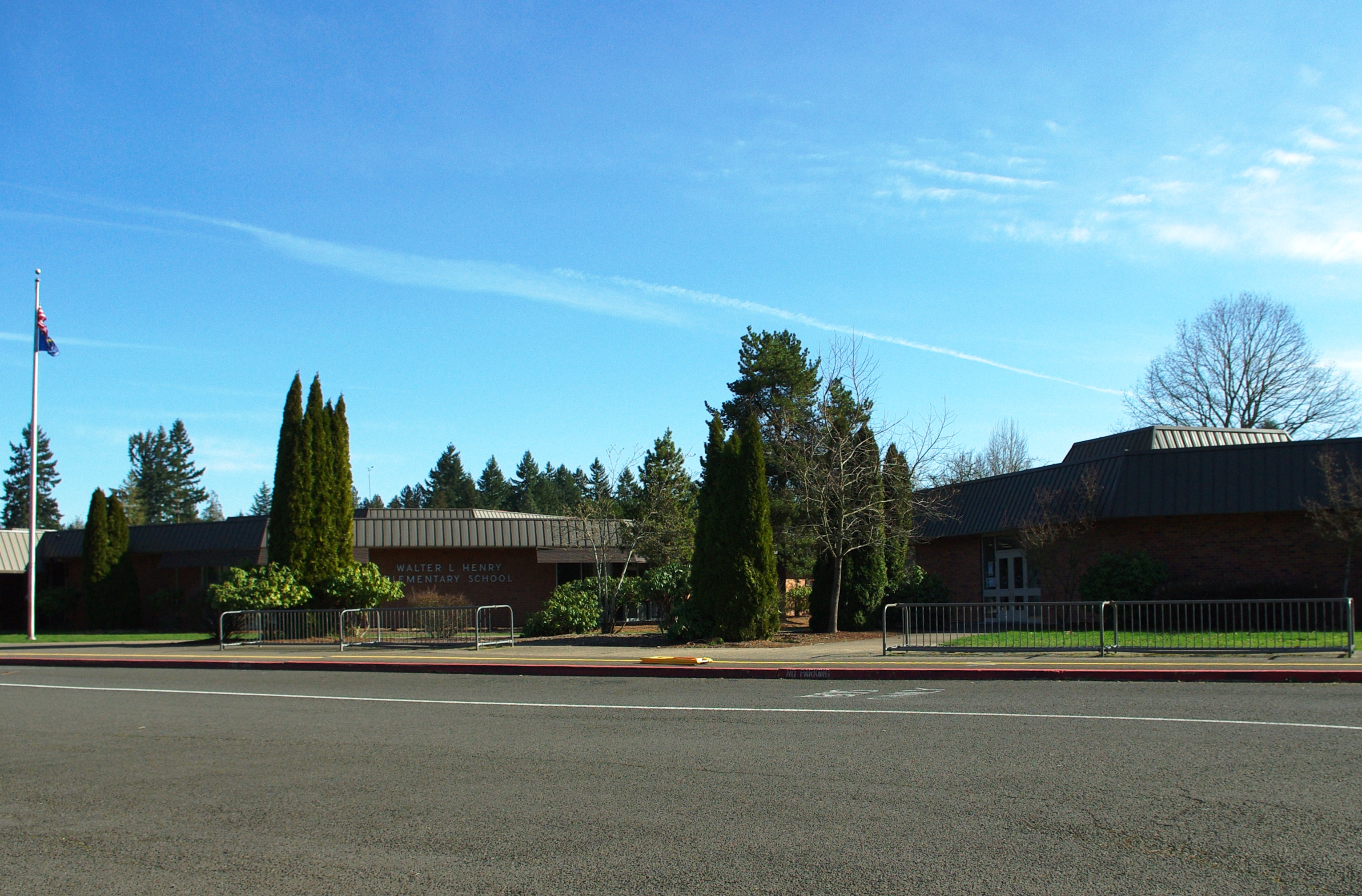
Henry

Opened in 1968, the school is located in the central part of Hillsboro, adjoining Turner Creek Park. The school has 628 students, who are known as the Wildcats. The school is named for Walter L. Henry, who worked in the district for 38 years as a teacher and principal. The single-story structure has 48,813 square feet (4,534.9 m^{2}) of space.

As of 2009, the school had repeatedly missed targets for federal academic guidelines and must either offer free tutoring or transfers to students under the No Child Left Behind Act. Under state goals, Henry scored 54.1 on the state's achievement index, and was listed as "needs improvement" for achievement. This was the only school in the district listed as "needs improvement" by the state in 2009.

==== Imlay ====
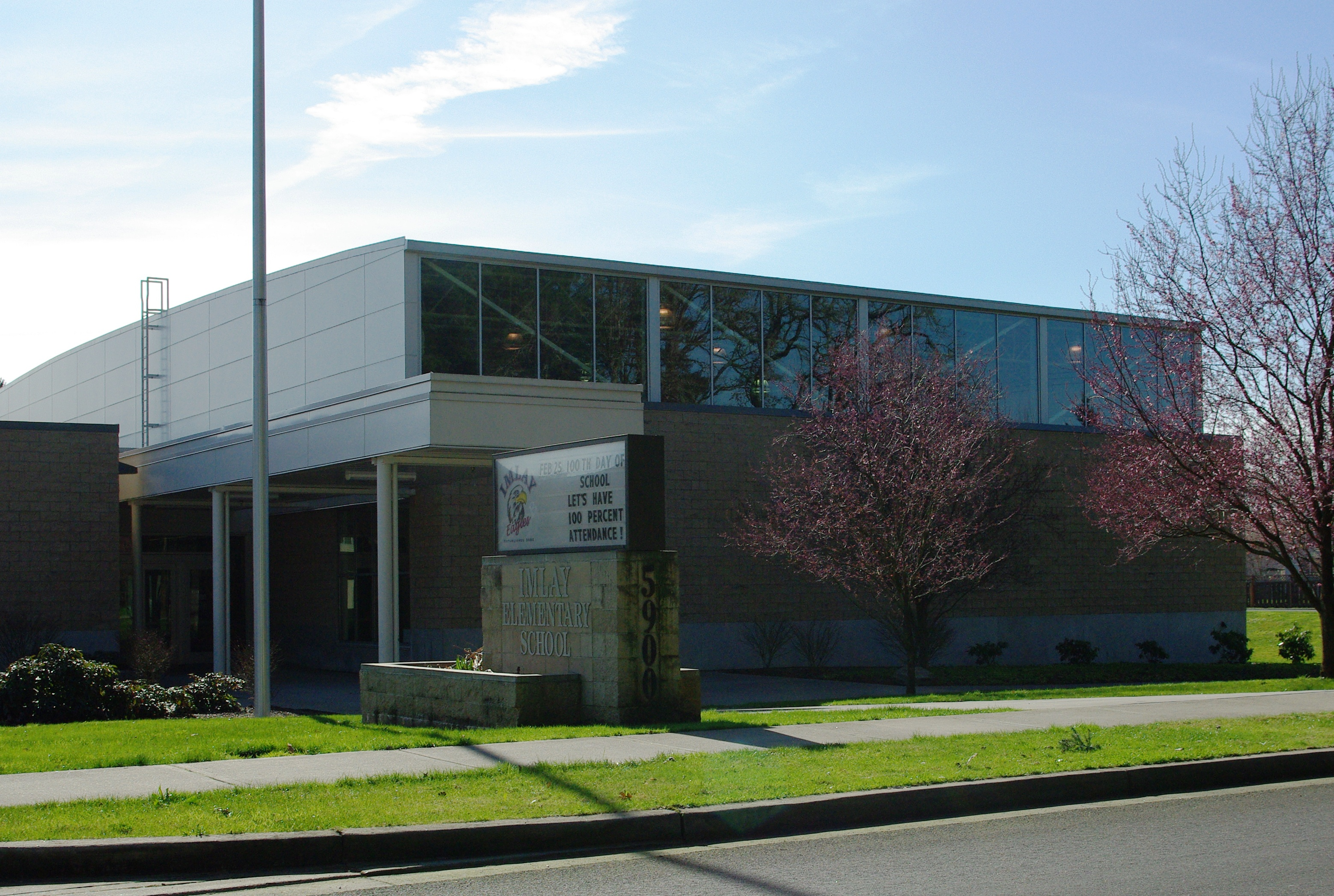
Imlay

Imlay Elementary is located in southeastern Hillsboro, near Century High School, at the intersection of Imlay Avenue and Lois Street. The school opened in 2002. The school is named after the Imlay family, who were also the namesake for a former community in the area. As of 2009, the school had repeatedly met all targets for federal academics, scored 93.7 on the state's achievement index, and was listed as outstanding by the state for achievement. The school has 624 students, who are known as the Eagles.

==== Indian Hills ====
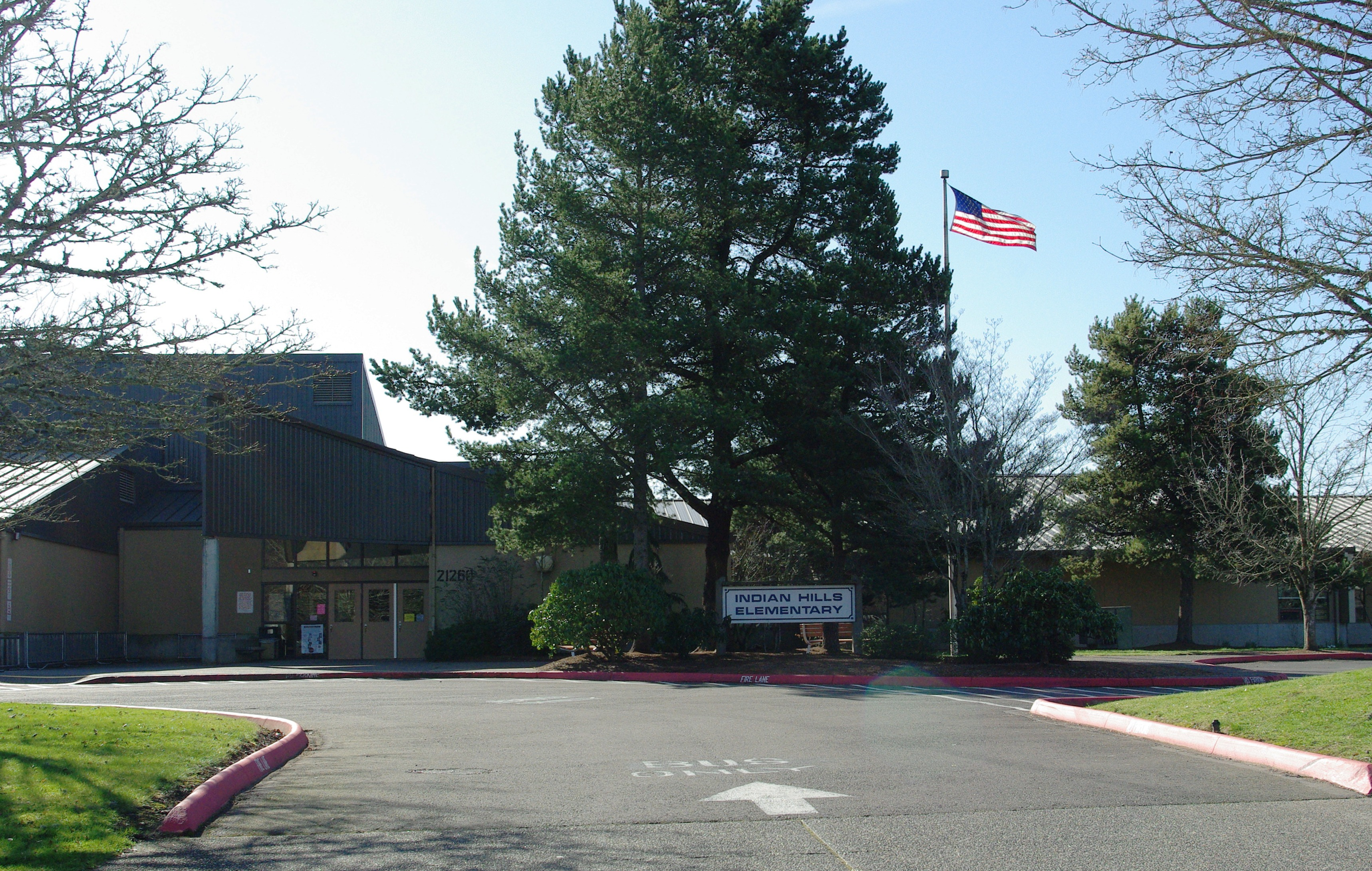
Indian Hills

Opened in 1979, Indian Hills was originally part of the Reedville School District, which merged into the Hillsboro district in 1996. Known as the Bears, the 450-student school is on the eastern edge of Hillsboro in the Reedville area along Rock Road. The one-story building contains 45,181 square feet (4,197.5 m^{2}). As of 2009, the school had repeatedly met all targets for federal academics, scored 104.3 on the state's achievement index, and was listed as outstanding by the state for achievement.

==== Jackson ====
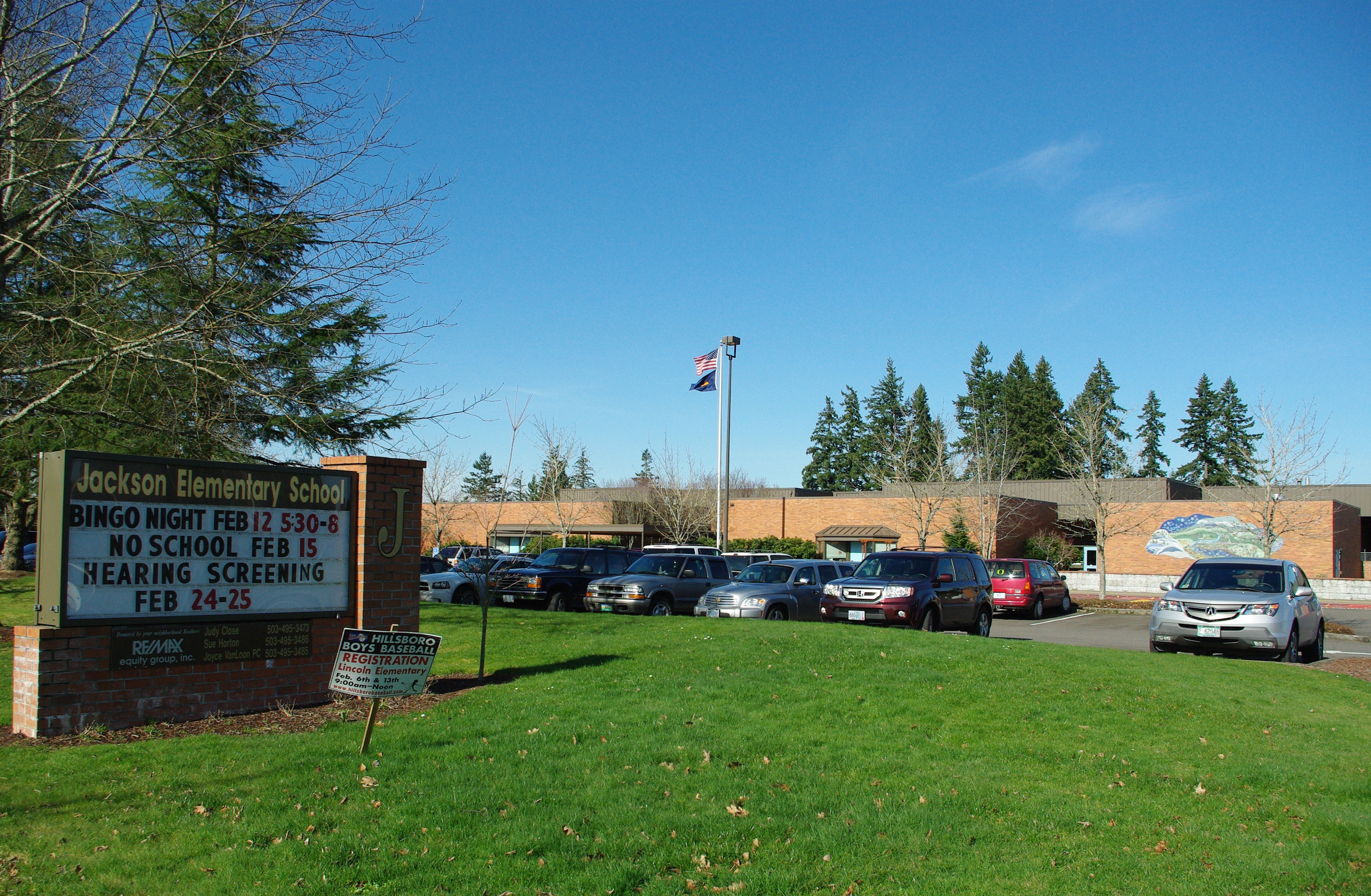
Jackson

Located in the north-central part of Hillsboro along Northeast Jackson School Road, the school opened in 1990. The school's mascot is the jaguar, and enrollment is 536 students. The school building is a single-story brick structure with 48,367 square feet (4,493.4 m^{2}) of space. As of 2009, the school had repeatedly met all targets for federal academics, scored 97.2 on the state's achievement index, and was listed as outstanding by the state for achievement.

==== Ladd Acres ====
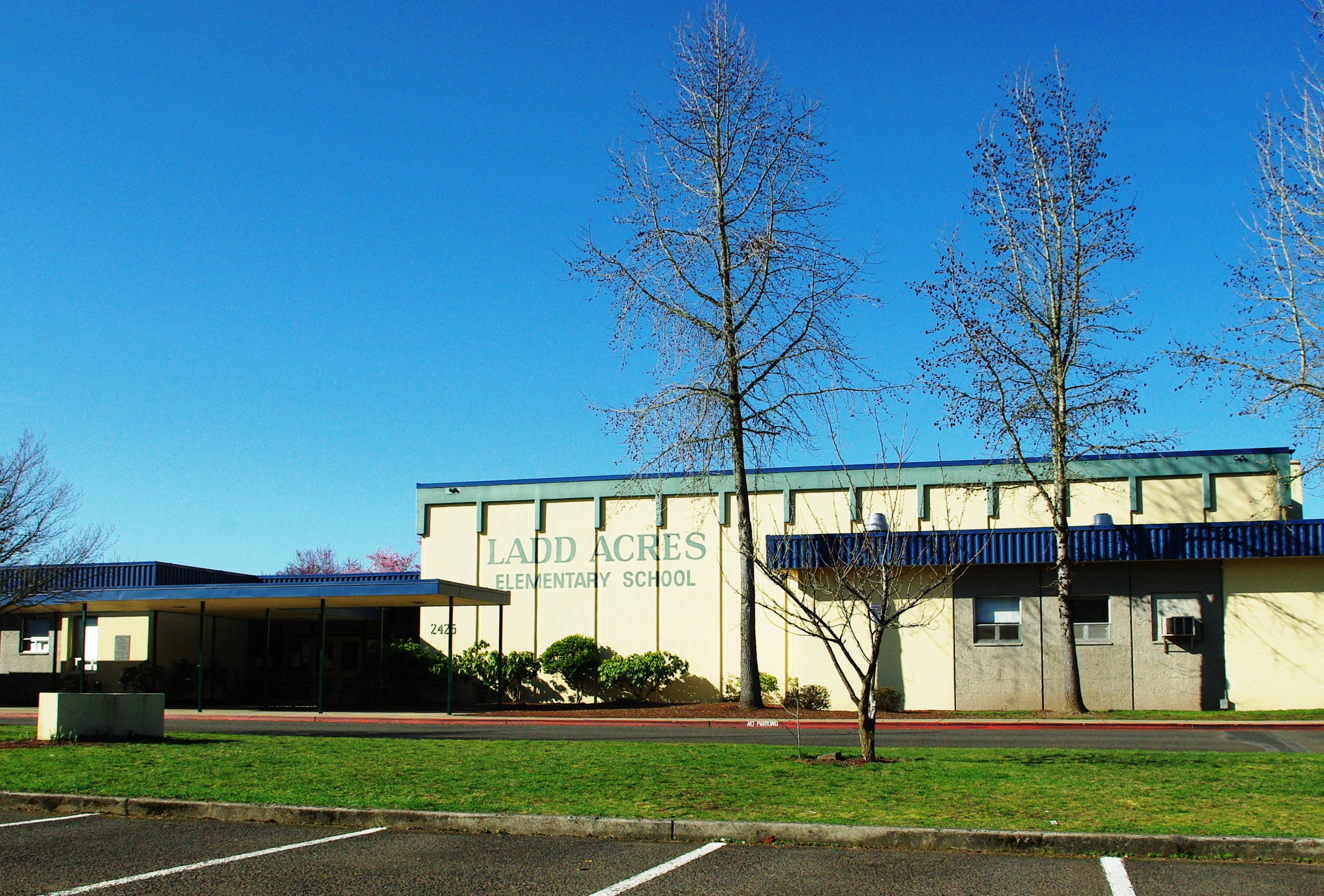
Ladd Acres

Originally part of the Reedville School District, Ladd Acres opened in 1968 with eight classrooms, and expanded in 1974. Named for William S. Ladd, the school is located on Cornelius Pass Road on the eastern edge of Hillsboro in the Reedville area. Its 624 students are known as the Astros. The one-story building totals 60,825 square feet (5,650.8 m^{2}) of space. As of 2009, the school had repeatedly met all targets for federal academics, scored 84.4 on the state's achievement index, and was listed as satisfactory by the state for achievement.

==== Lenox ====
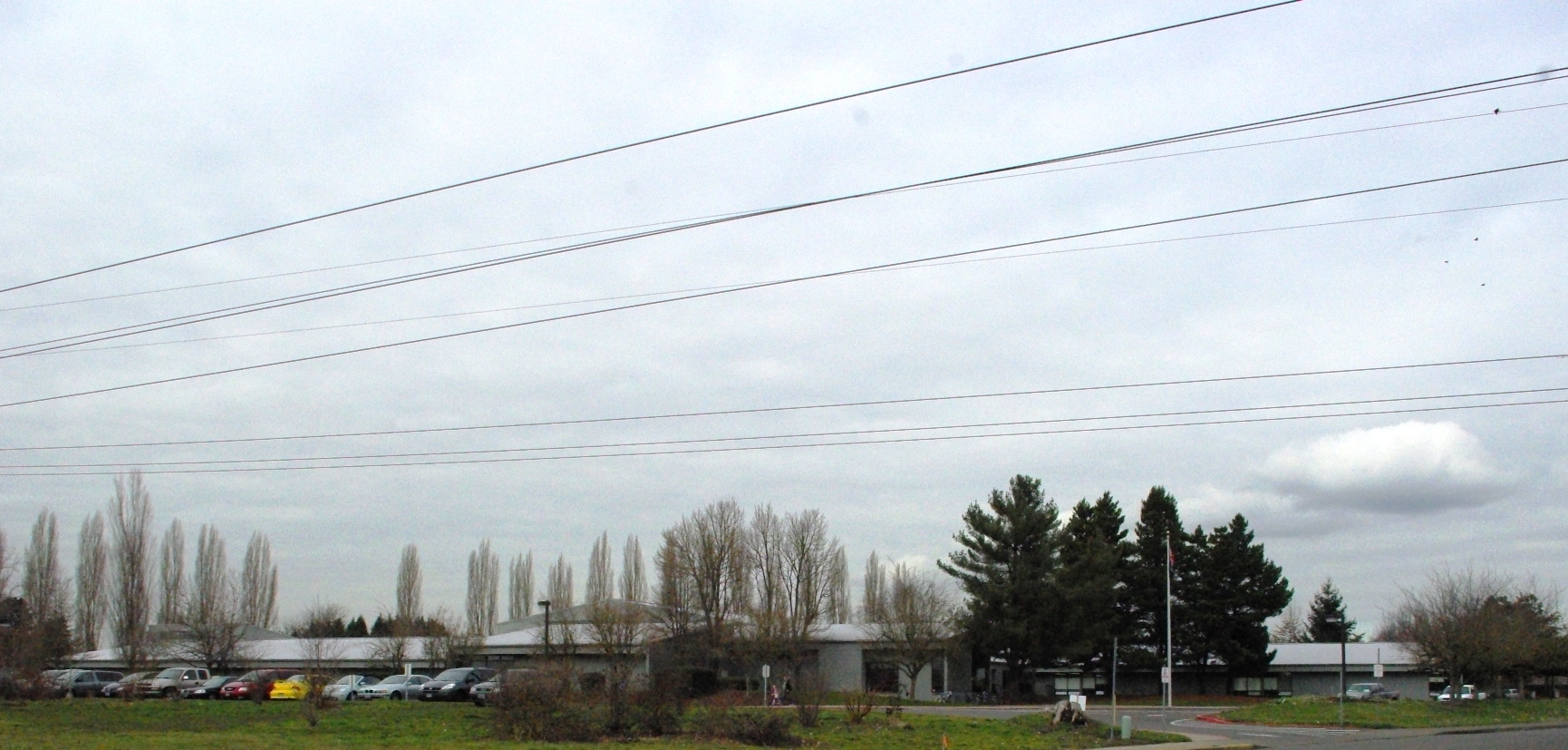
Lenox

The school was named for early settler David Thomas Lenox who helped establish the nearby West Union Baptist Church, and its mascot is the pioneer. Located in the Rock Creek area near the Sunset Highway and Cornelius Pass Road, the school has 390 students. The school opened in 1978 and was originally part of the West Union School District. The single-story structure covers 51,074 square feet (4,744.9 m^{2}) of space. As of 2009, the school had repeatedly met all targets for federal academics, scored 96.8 on the state's achievement index, and was listed as outstanding by the state for achievement.

==== Lincoln Street ====
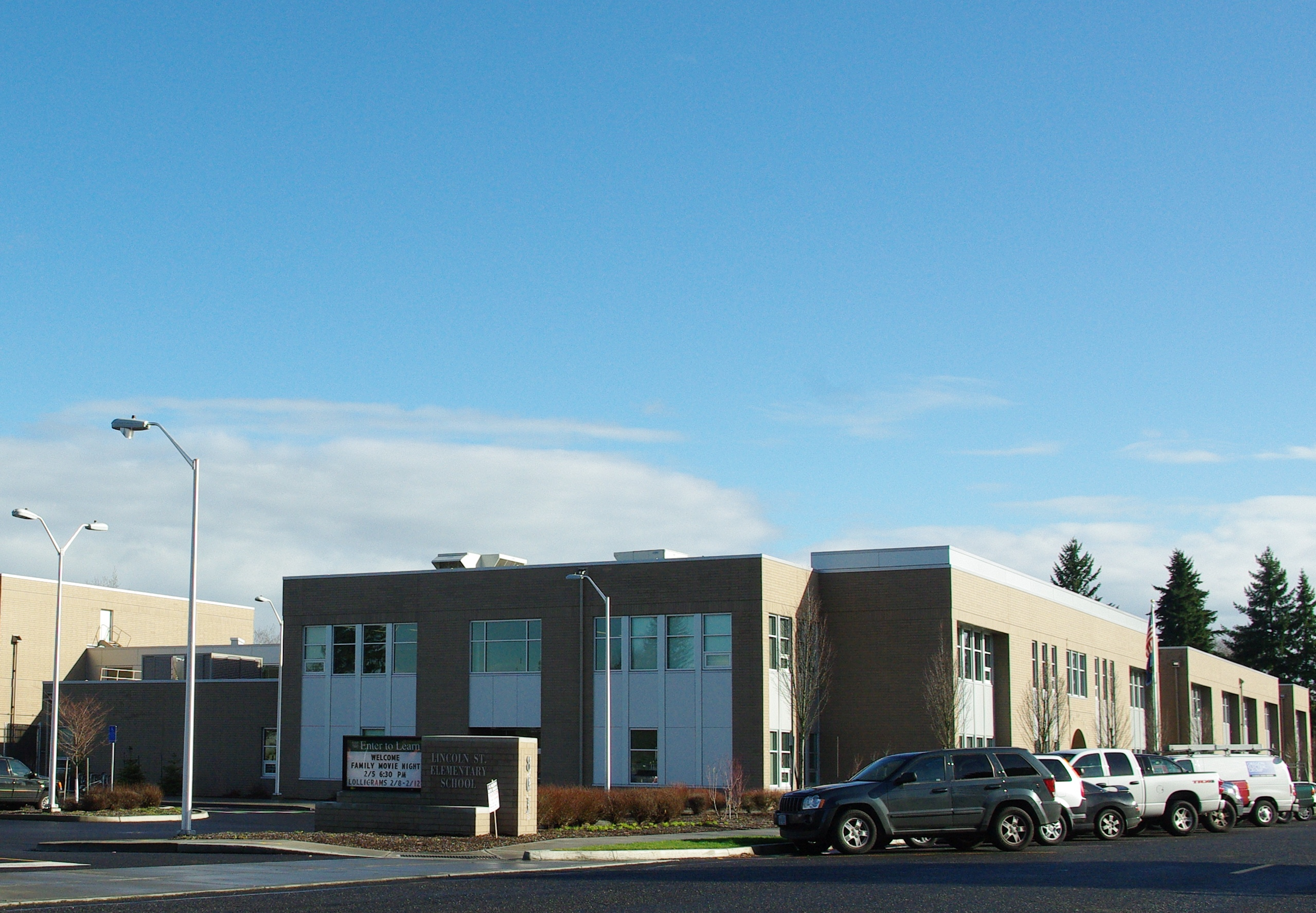
Lincoln Street

Opened in 2008, the school is located in downtown Hillsboro along northeast Lincoln Street and replaced David Hill Elementary. The two-story, brick-faced structure was paid for by a 2006 bond measure and was built on the athletic fields of the now-closed J.B. Thomas Middle School. After Thomas was closed, it was demolished and athletic fields were built on the former grounds. There are 533 students enrolled, who are known as the Lynx.

==== W. Verne McKinney ====
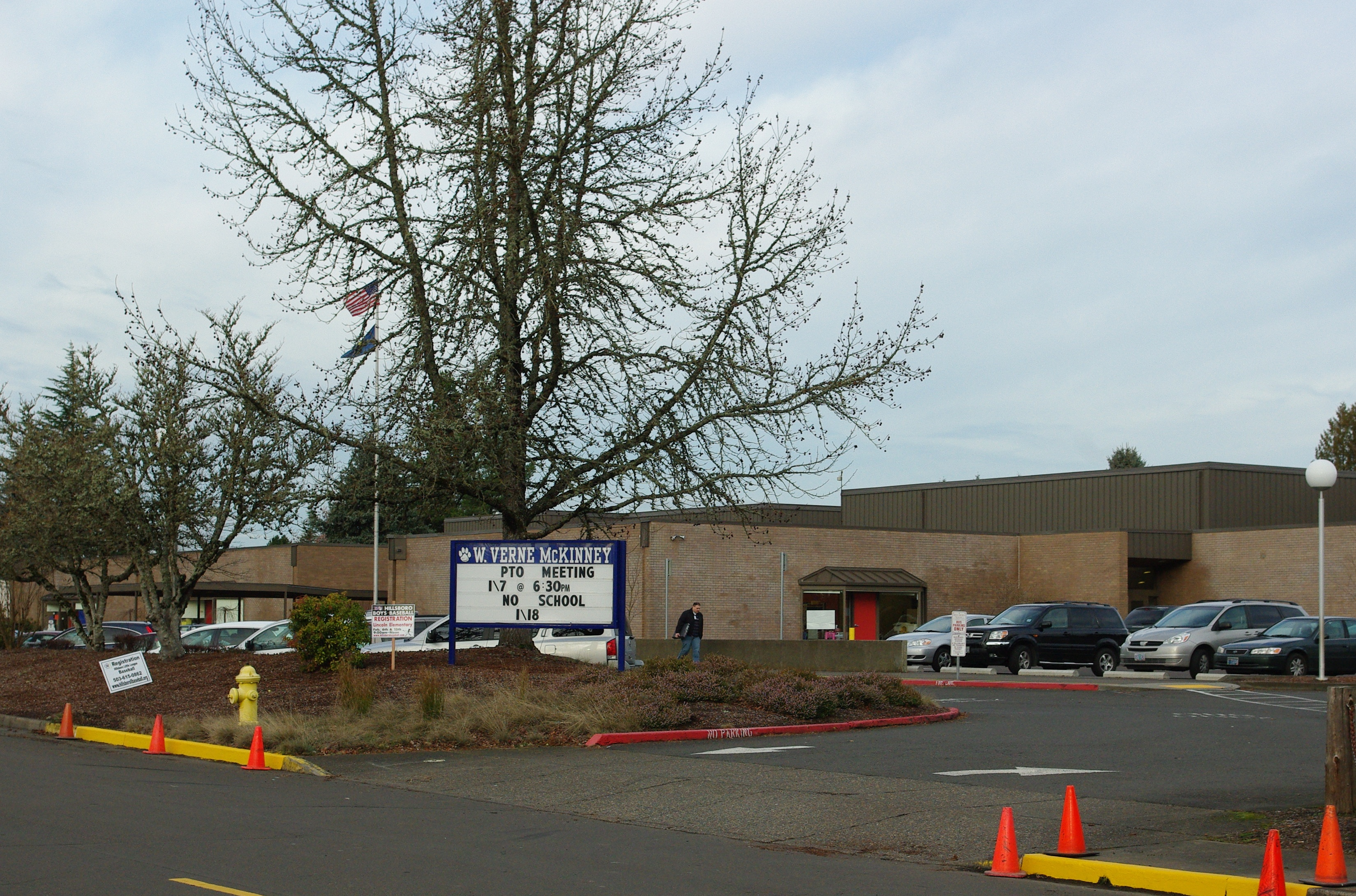
McKinney

Built for $941,000, the school was named after longtime Hillsboro Argus publisher and editor W. Verne McKinney. Opened in 1970, this was the first of the open classroom schools in the district, with multiple grades held in one large classroom. The school is located in northwest Hillsboro and the 504 students are known as the Cougars. The single-story structure has 53,129 square feet (4,935.8 m^{2}) of space. As of 2009, the school had repeatedly met all targets for federal academics, scored 84.9 on the state's achievement index, and was listed as satisfactory by the state for achievement.

==== Minter Bridge ====
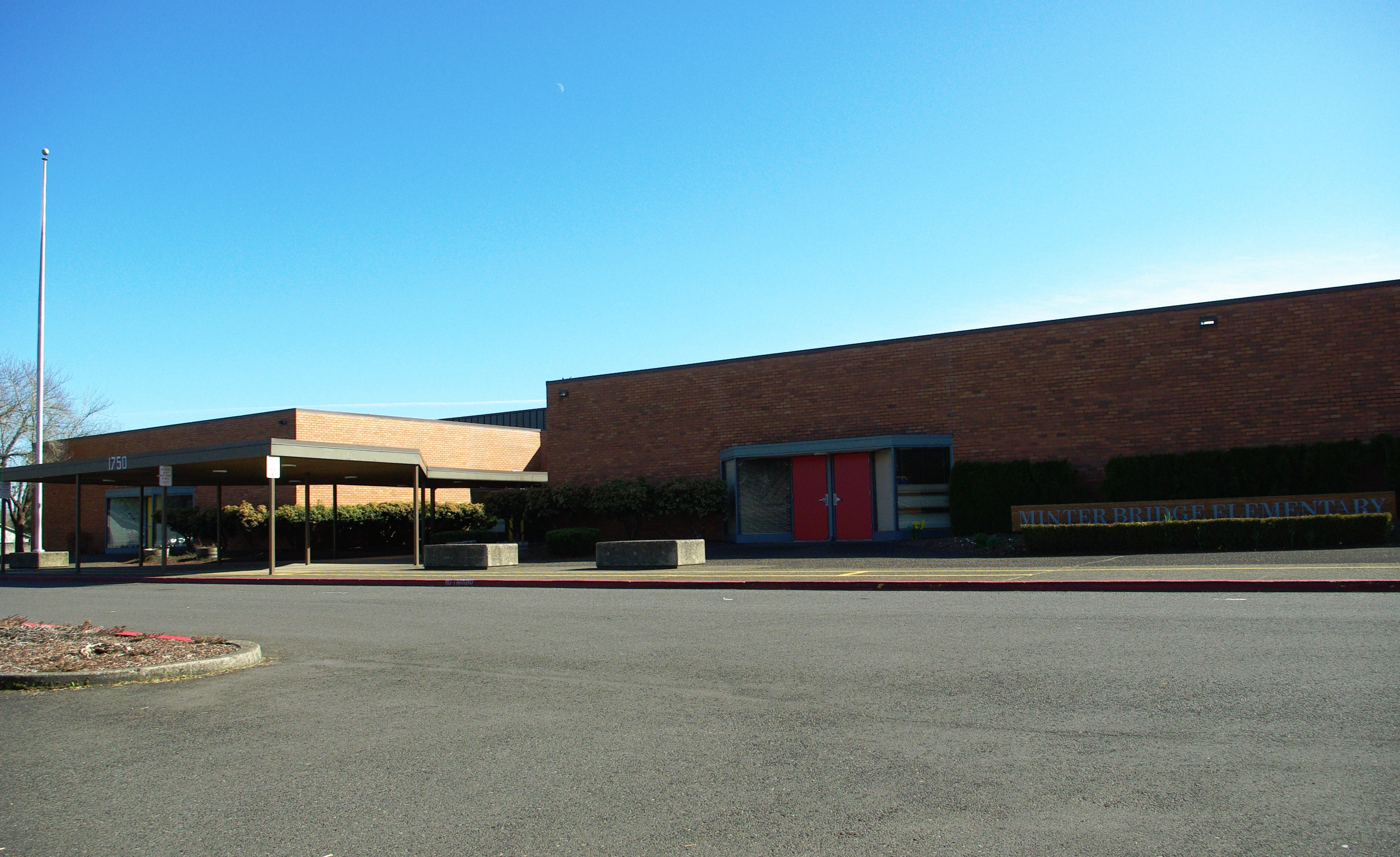
Minter Bridge

Named for the nearby street of the same name, the school is located in southeast Hillsboro adjacent to Hillsboro High School. The school opened in 1980 and the 446 students are known as the Dolphins. The school building is a single-story, brick-faced structure with 47,563 square feet (4,418.7 m^{2}) of space. As of 2009, the school had repeatedly met all targets for federal academics, scored 85 on the state's achievement index, and was listed as satisfactory by the state for achievement.

==== Mooberry ====
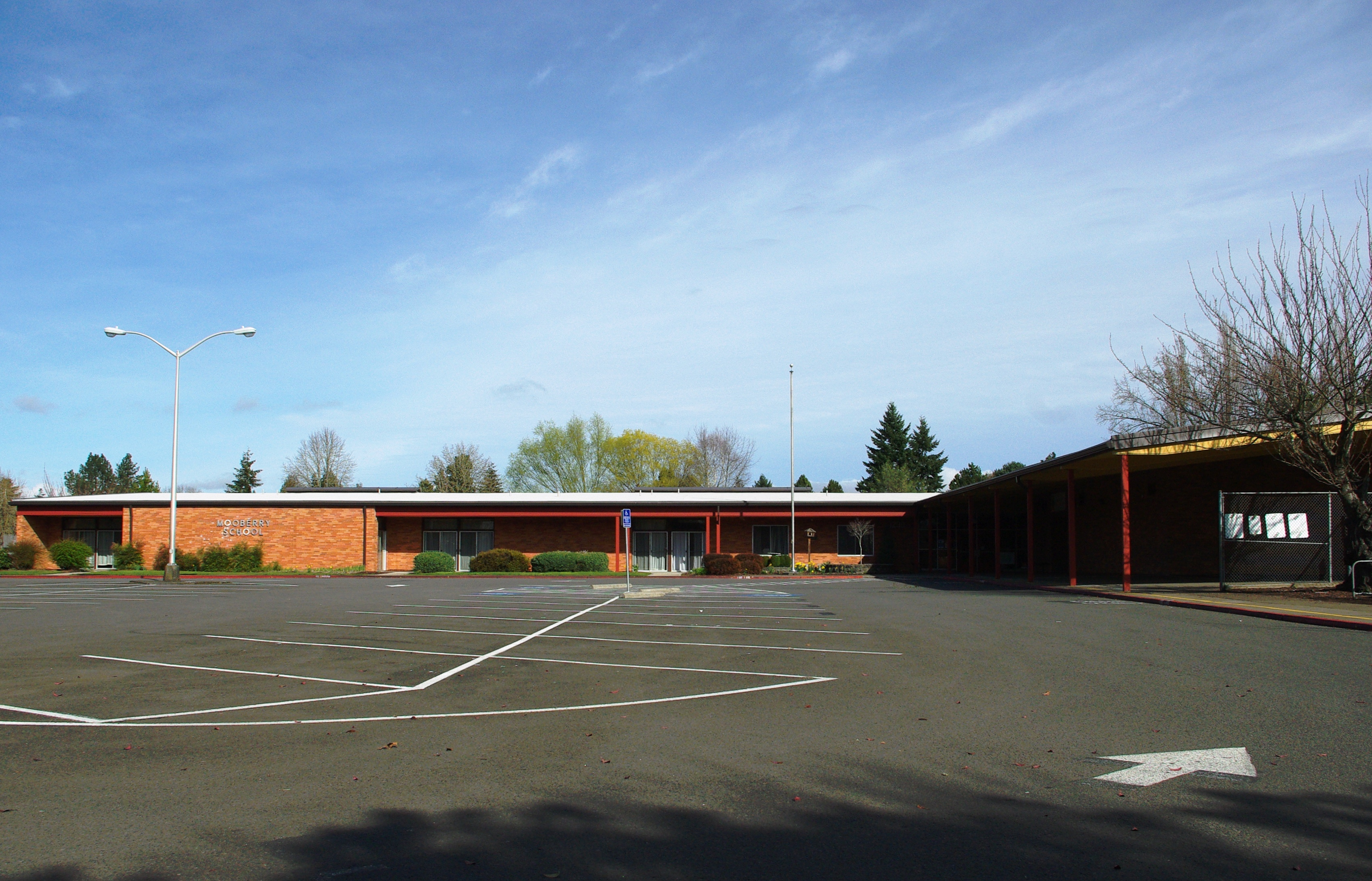
Mooberry

Mooberry is located in northeast Hillsboro on 10th Street. The 34,400-square-foot (3,200 m^{2}) school opened in 1963 at a cost of $348,000. The school has 508 students, who are known as the Mustangs. The school was named after two teachers, Lester and Margaret Mooberry. The school building is a single-story, brick-faced structure, with the school grounds covering 215,000 square feet (20,000 m^{2}). As of 2009, the school had repeatedly missed targets of federal academic guidelines and must either offer free tutoring or transfers to students under the No Child Left Behind Act. Under state goals, Mooberry scored 67.6 on the state's achievement index, and was listed as satisfactory for achievement.

==== North Plains ====
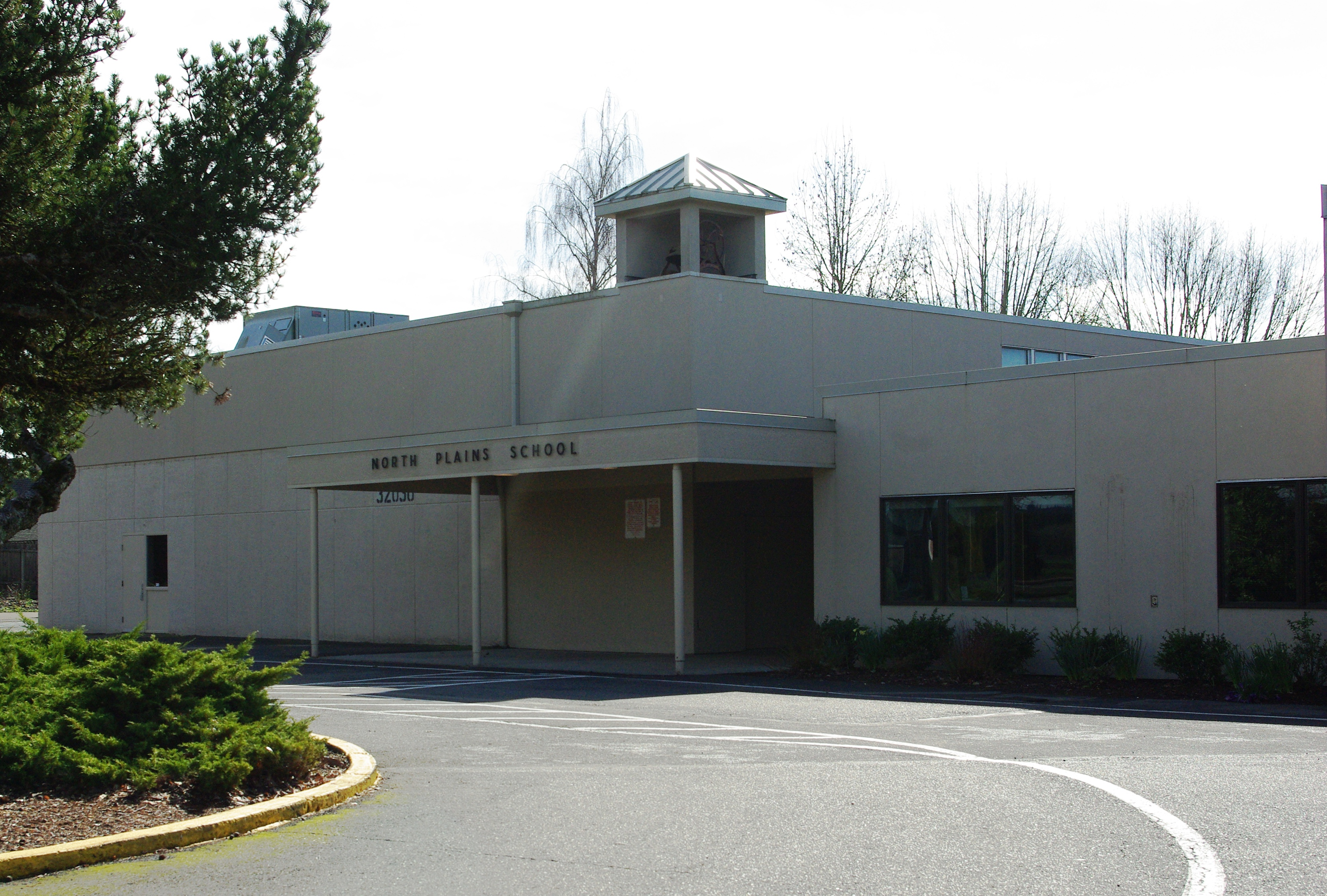
North Plains

Located north of Hillsboro in the city of North Plains on Northwest North Avenue, the school was part of the North Plains Elementary School District 70 until it was unified with the Hillsboro district in 1996. The North Plains district was formed in 1886, with the elementary school opening in 1915. The original school closed in 1953 when the current school opened, and the old building was demolished in 1960. The school building is a single-story structure with 46,913 square feet (4,358.4 m^{2}) of space. Students at the 317 student school are known as the Hawks. As of 2009, the school had repeatedly met all targets for federal academics, scored 100.9 on the state's achievement index, and was listed as outstanding by the state for achievement.

==== Orenco ====
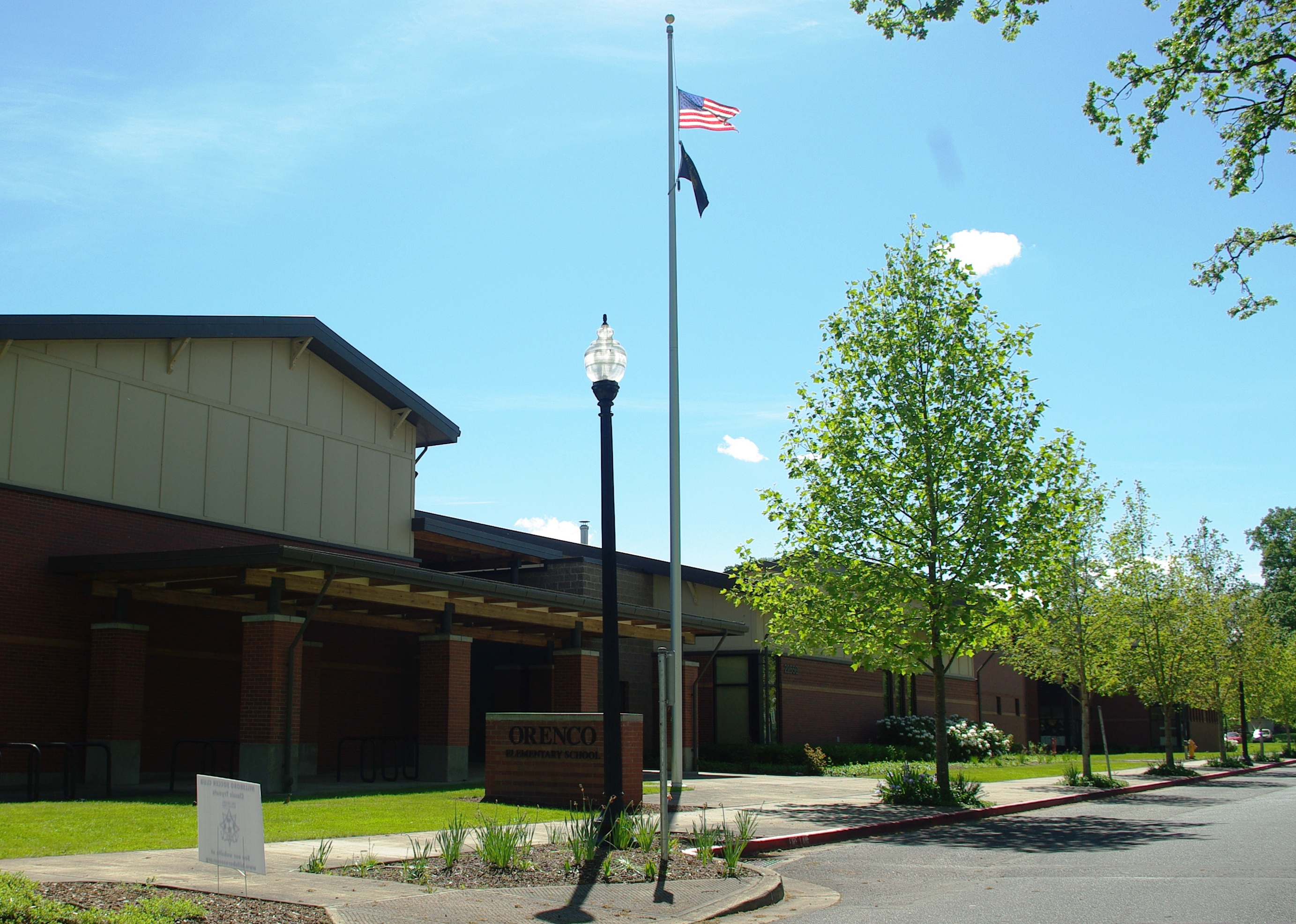
Orenco

The Orenco neighborhood, once a city east of Hillsboro incorporated from 1913 to 1938, formed a school district (district 38) in 1908 when it split from the Shute district. The community was laid out in 1908 and the first school building was opened in 1909 near 228th and Birch. The school grew to include high school classes by 1918. Orenco's school district was later merged into the West Union School District and the school was torn down after 1976, though the district retained the land.

In 1996, the West Union district merged into the Hillsboro district, and in 2000 the new Orenco Elementary school opened on the same property as the old school, a block east of the original school building. The school has 424 students, who are known as the Orcas. The school building is a two-story, brick-faced structure with 69,435 square feet (6,450.7 m^{2}) of space. As of 2009, the school had repeatedly met all targets for federal academics, scored 95.1 on the state's achievement index, and was listed as outstanding by the state for achievement.

==== Paul L. Patterson ====
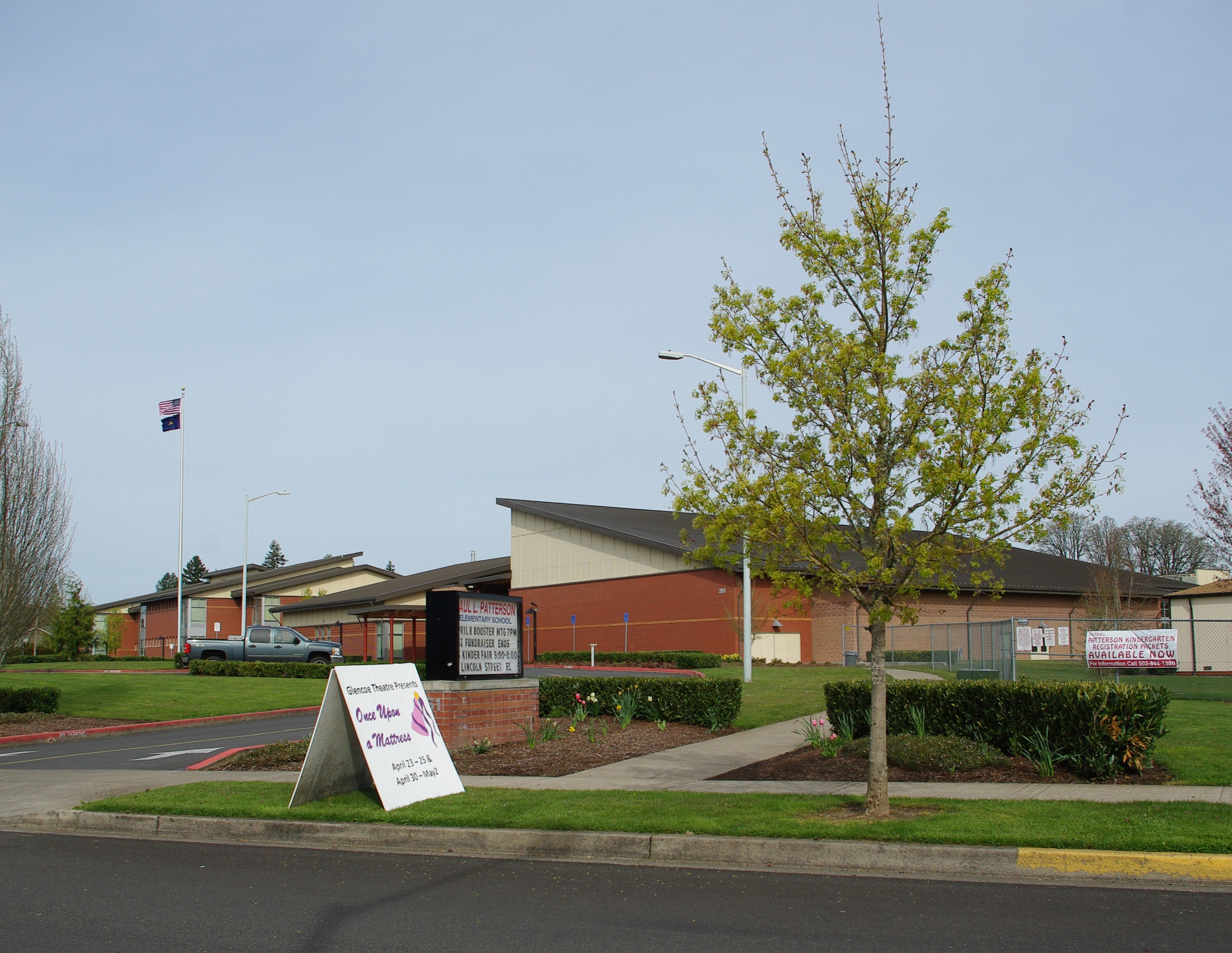
Patterson

Located in the northwest part of Hillsboro on Northeast Lenox Street near Glenoce High School, the elementary school opened in 2000. It is named after former Oregon Governor Paul L. Patterson, who also served as city attorney. The school mascot is the panther. The school building is a two-story, brick-faced structure with 69,435 square feet (6,450.7 m^{2}) of space. As of 2009, the school had repeatedly met all targets for federal academics, scored 83.1 on the state's achievement index, and was listed as satisfactory by the state for achievement. Enrollment at the school is 406 students.

==== Quatama ====
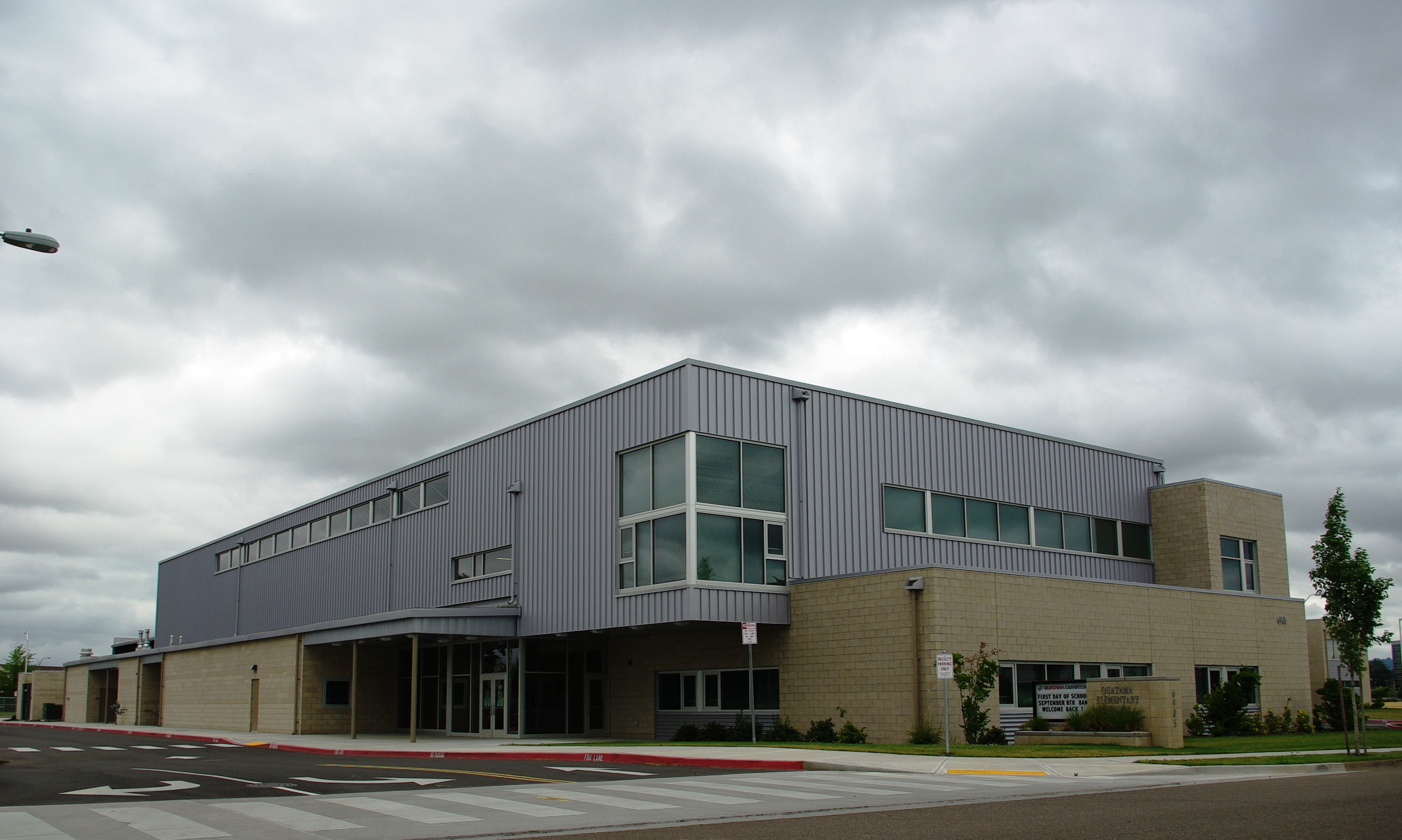
Quatama

Opened in 2008 in the Orenco area near 231st and Cornell Road, the school is a short distance from Orenco Elementary and adjacent to Sonrise Church. The two-story school has a capacity of 600, with students known as the Coyotes. The beige and silver-colored structure was paid for by a 2006 bond measure. Quatama is named after the area located about 1 mile east of the school where the Quatama MAX station sits. The community, settled by Hungarians who worked for the Oregon Nursery Company, received its name from the Quatama station on the Oregon Electric Railway at that location.

==== Reedville ====
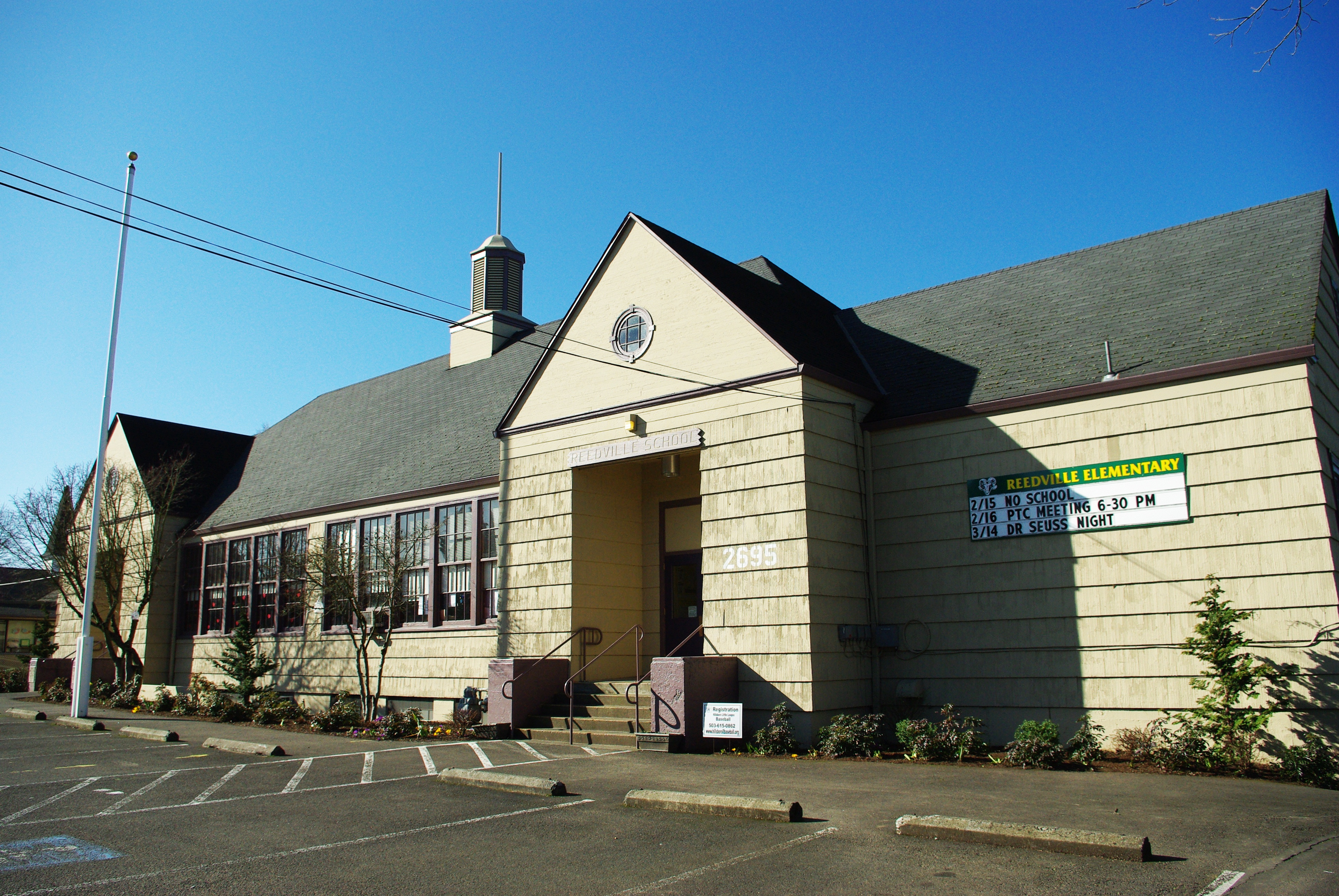
Reedville

Reedville School District 29 was formed by 1859 with a one-room schoolhouse built that same year at what is now Johnson Road and 209th Avenue. In 1920, that building was demolished and a three-room school was built at the same site. The school continued to expand, growing to 12 classrooms, a gym, and several other rooms by 1976. This single-story building remains in use as the current Reedville Elementary School, and has a total of 16,247 square feet (1,509.4 m^{2}) of space.

Located in the Reedville area, the school and district were merged into the Hillsboro district in 1996. The 278-student school has the ram as its mascot. As of 2009, the school had repeatedly met all targets for federal academics, scored 69.1 on the state's achievement index, and was listed as satisfactory by the state for achievement.

==== Rosedale ====
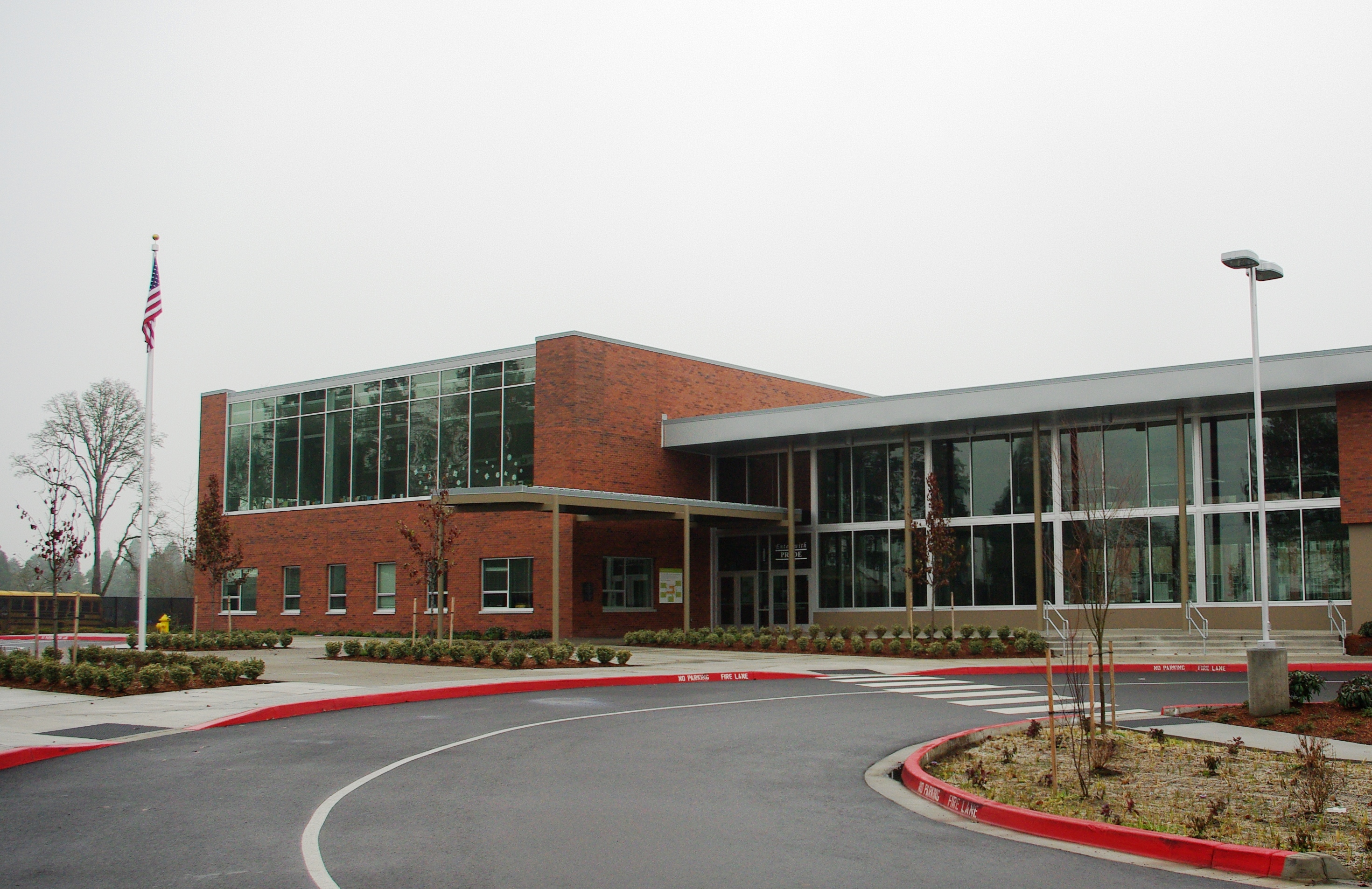
Rosedale

Home of the Pride, the $21 million school opened in 2009 with a capacity of 600 students. The two-story, red brick building was paid for by a 2006 bond measure, and has environmentally friendly features such as using recycled rainwater for irrigation. The school has approximately 400 students, and became the first school in the district to reach LEED certification when it earned Gold status in February 2010. The school is located in the southeastern part of Hillsboro, south of Tualatin Valley Highway (TV Highway) at the edge of the urban growth boundary. In 1921, the Rosedale School District was established, but by 1955 the district had merged into the Hillsboro Elementary School District and the single Rosedale school was closed.

==== Tamarack ====
Tamarack Elementary School opened in 2023 at a cost of $41.1 million, funded by the 2017 bond measure. It can hold 600 students. The 73,500 square feet (6,828 m² ), two-story building was named after the tamarack tree and the Tamarack Park nearby. The mascot is a river otter. The floorplans are similar to Brookwood Elementary and Atfalati Ridge Elementary, which were all constructed or rebuilt during the 2017 bond. Tamarack was the last project to be completed as part of the 2017 bond measure.

==== L. C. Tobias ====
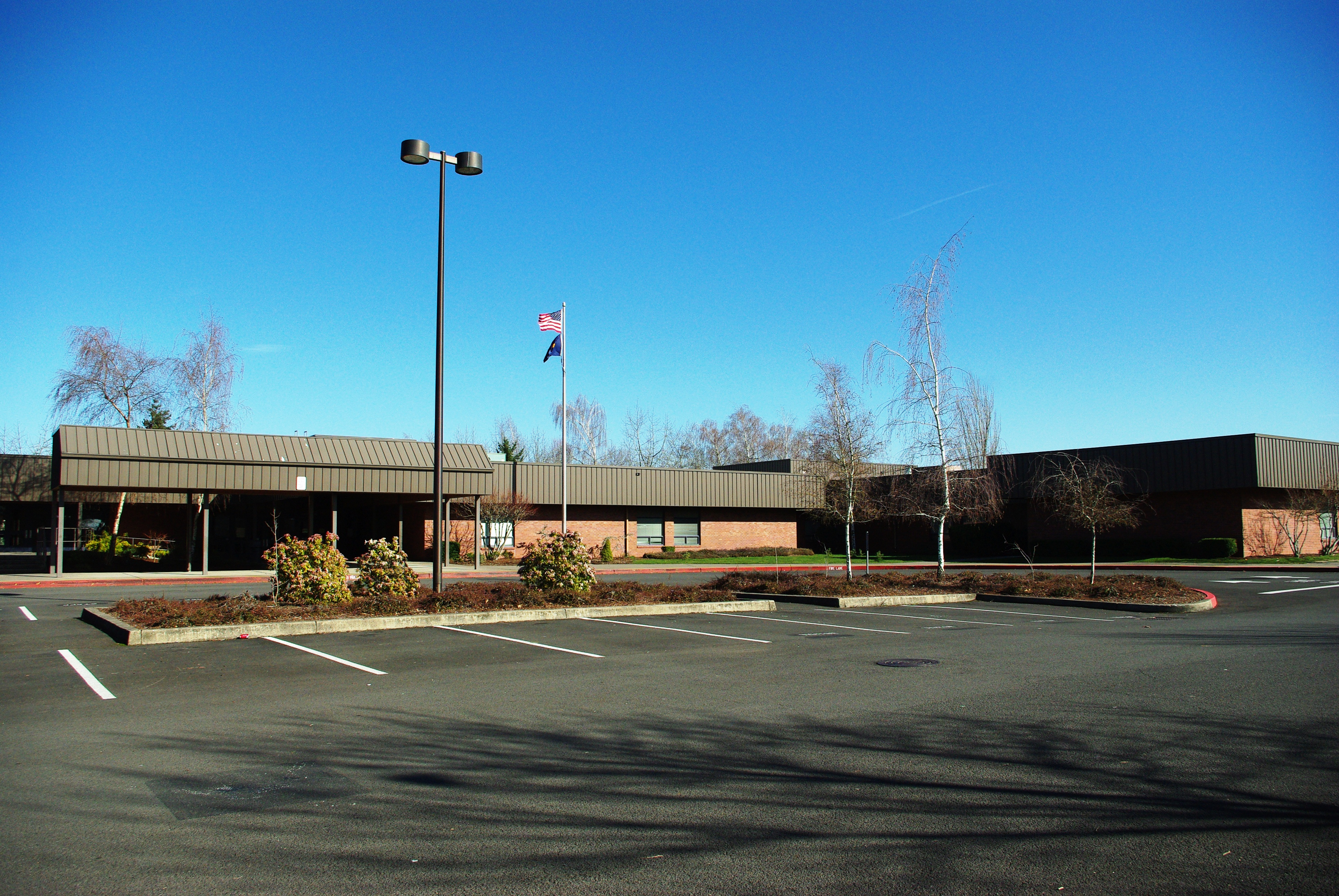
Tobias

Located southeast of Hillsboro near West Baseline Road and 206th Avenue, the 554 students at the school are known as the Tigers. The 52,650-square-foot (4,891 m^{2}), one-story, brick building was completed in 1992 and was originally part of the Reedville School District until the merger with the Hillsboro districts in 1996. The school was named after Louis C. Tobias, a businessman in the area and namesake of the former community in the area of the school. As of 2009, the school had missed its target for federal academics and was on a watch list, scored 80.4 on the state's achievement index, and was listed as satisfactory by the state for achievement.

==== West Union ====
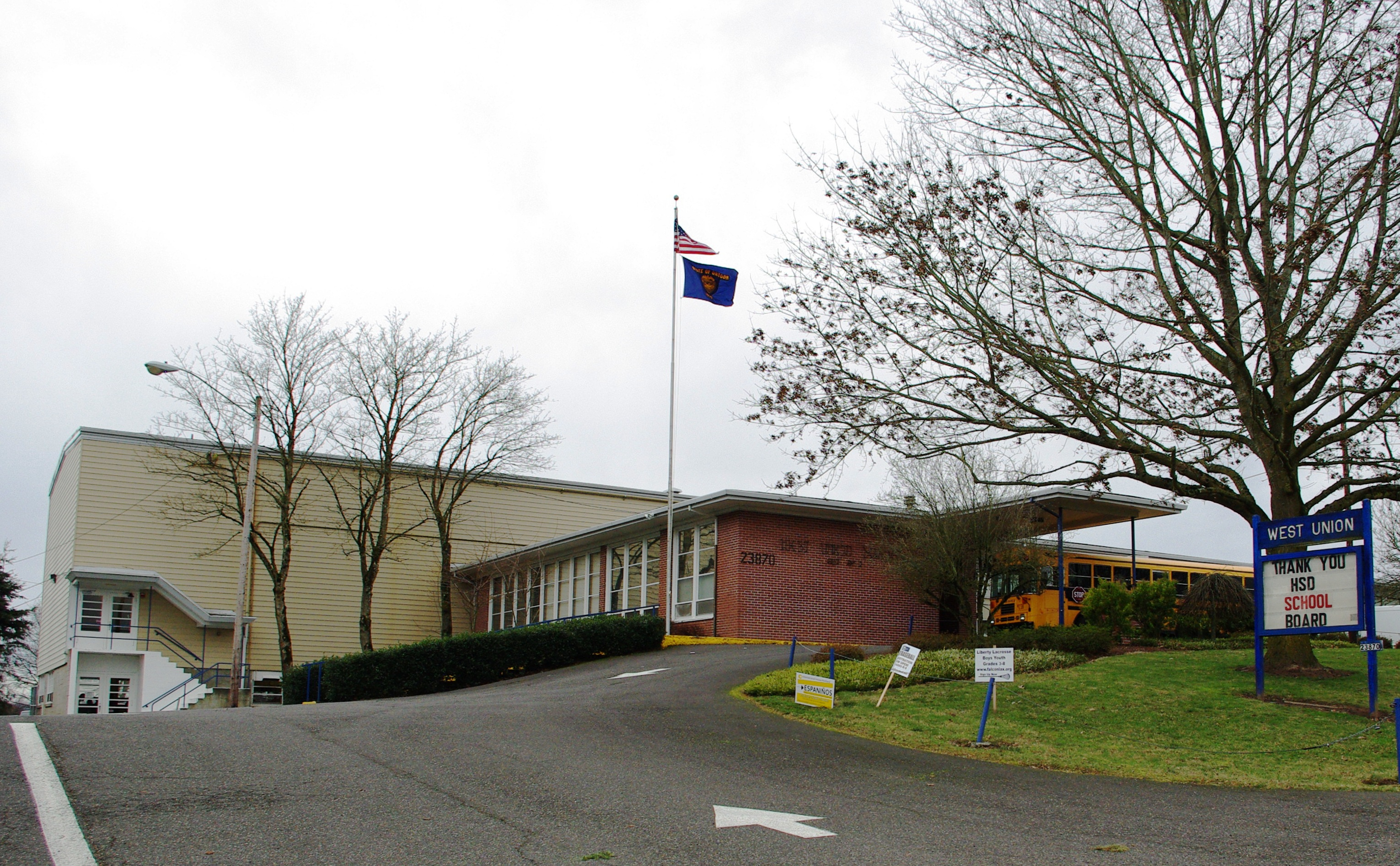
West Union

Opened in 1948 as part of the West Union School District, the district and school merged into the Hillsboro district in 1996. West Union School District 1 was established in 1851 and was the first district in the county. The school is located north of Hillsboro in the community of West Union on West Union Road at Helvetia Road. The school has an enrollment of 317, and its students are known as the Wolverines. As of 2009, the school had repeatedly met all targets for federal academics, scored 103.7 on the state's achievement index, and was listed as outstanding by the state for achievement.

==== Witch Hazel ====
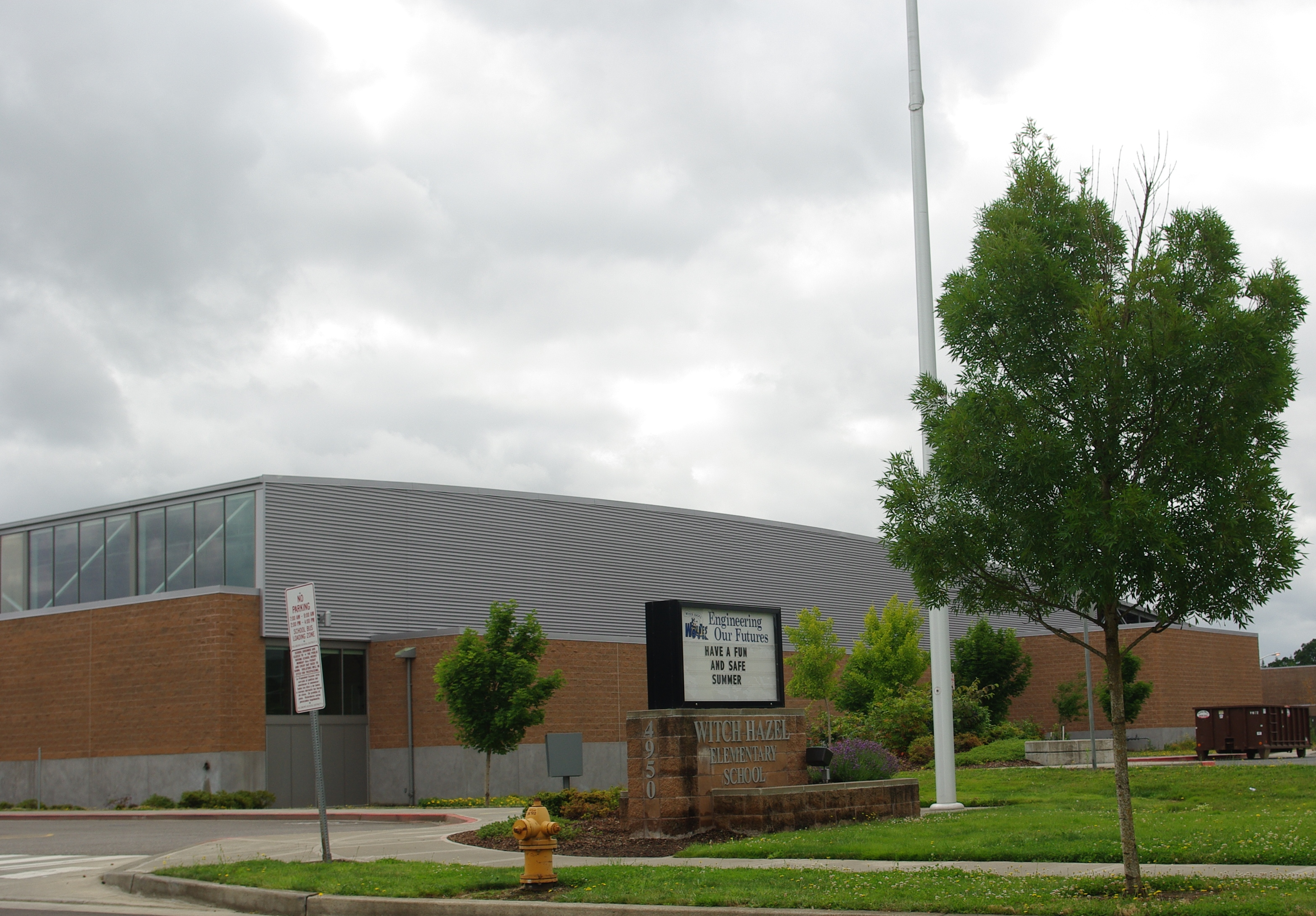
Witch Hazel

Located in southeast Hillsboro at Brookwood Avenue near TV Highway, the school is named for the former community of Witch Hazel where the school is situated. Opened in 2003, the current building replaced an older building located several blocks north on the south side of TV Highway, where Brookwood Avenue now crosses the highway at the railroad tracks. The old school had previously been in its own school district and the Reedville School District.

The 655 students at the school are known as the Wolves. As of 2009, the school had repeatedly missed targets of federal academic guidelines and must either offer free tutoring or transfers to students under the No Child Left Behind Act. At the state level, Witch Hazel scored 77.9 on the state's achievement index and was listed as satisfactory by the state for achievement.

=== Middle schools ===
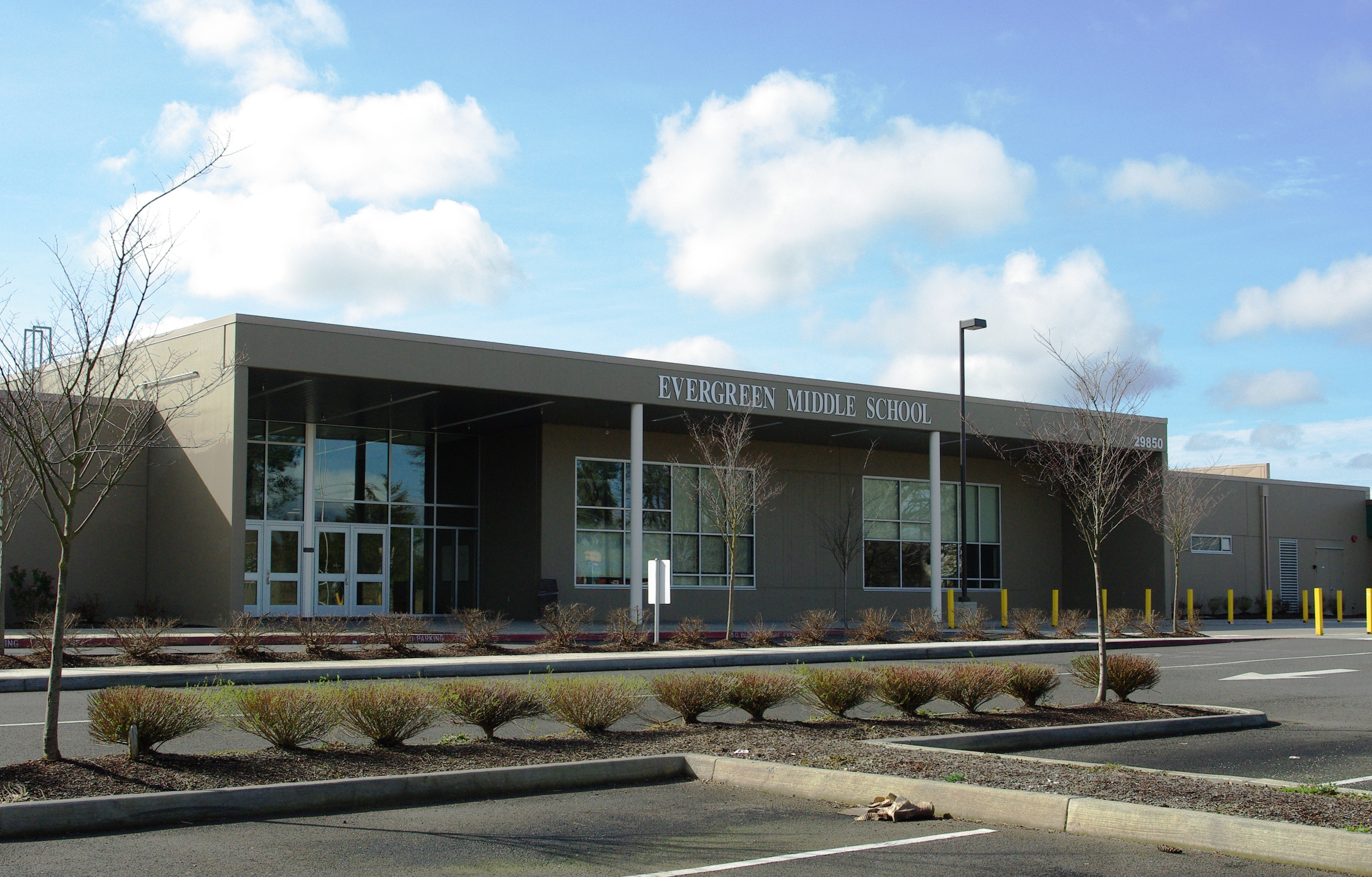
Evergreen

The Hillsboro district operates four middle schools housing 7th and 8th grades. Each feeds into a single high school.

==== R. A. Brown ====
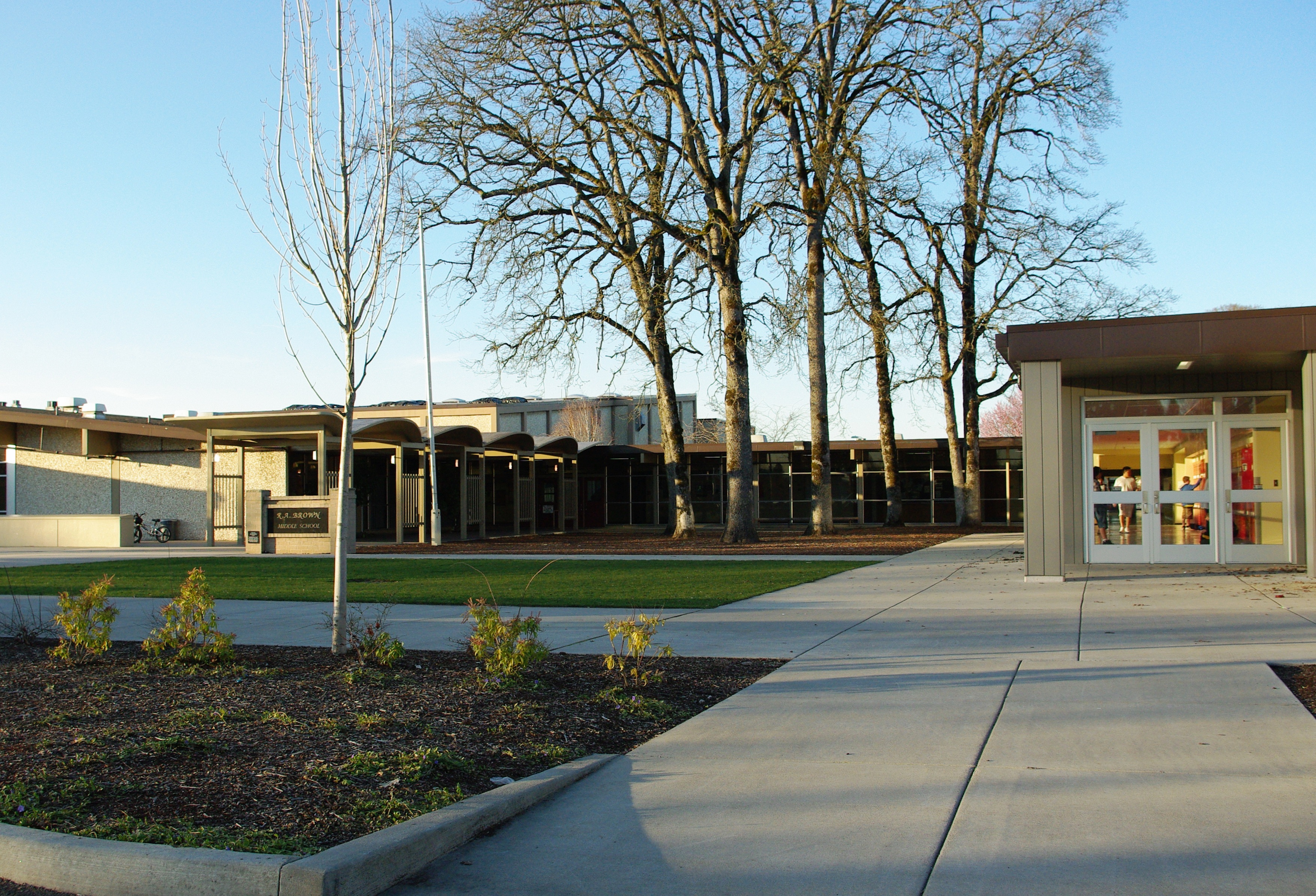
Brown

In 1963, the Union High School District opened East Hillsboro Junior High School, with Raymond A. "Pat" Brown as the principal. Brown retired in 1975, and the school was renamed in his honor as Brown Junior High. An expansion in 1980 enlarged the library, gymnasium, and the counseling center. The school became a middle school in 1997. Another expansion about 2007 added eight classrooms along the eastern edge of the school.

Located along what is now Cornelius Pass Road, the school is in the Reedville neighborhood between West Baseline and Tualatin Valley Highway. The school houses 7th and 8th grades, and feeds into Century High School. Butternut Creek, Tobias, Imlay, Indian Hills, Ladd Acres, and Reedville elementary schools feed into Brown. As of 2013, the school had 816 students and had a below average performance rating from the state.

==== Evergreen ====
Located on the northwest edge of the city along Evergreen Road, the school houses 7th and 8th grades, and feeds into Glencoe High School. Free Orchards, Jackson, McKinney, Patterson, Lincoln Street, and North Plains elementary schools feed into Evergreen. As of 2013, the school had 794 students and had a below average performance rating from the state.

The school opened in 1981 as Evergreen Junior High with Joe Rodriquez as the first principal. It was the fourth junior high in the then Union High School District, and was expanded the next year to house emotionally handicapped students in the district.

==== J. W. Poynter ====
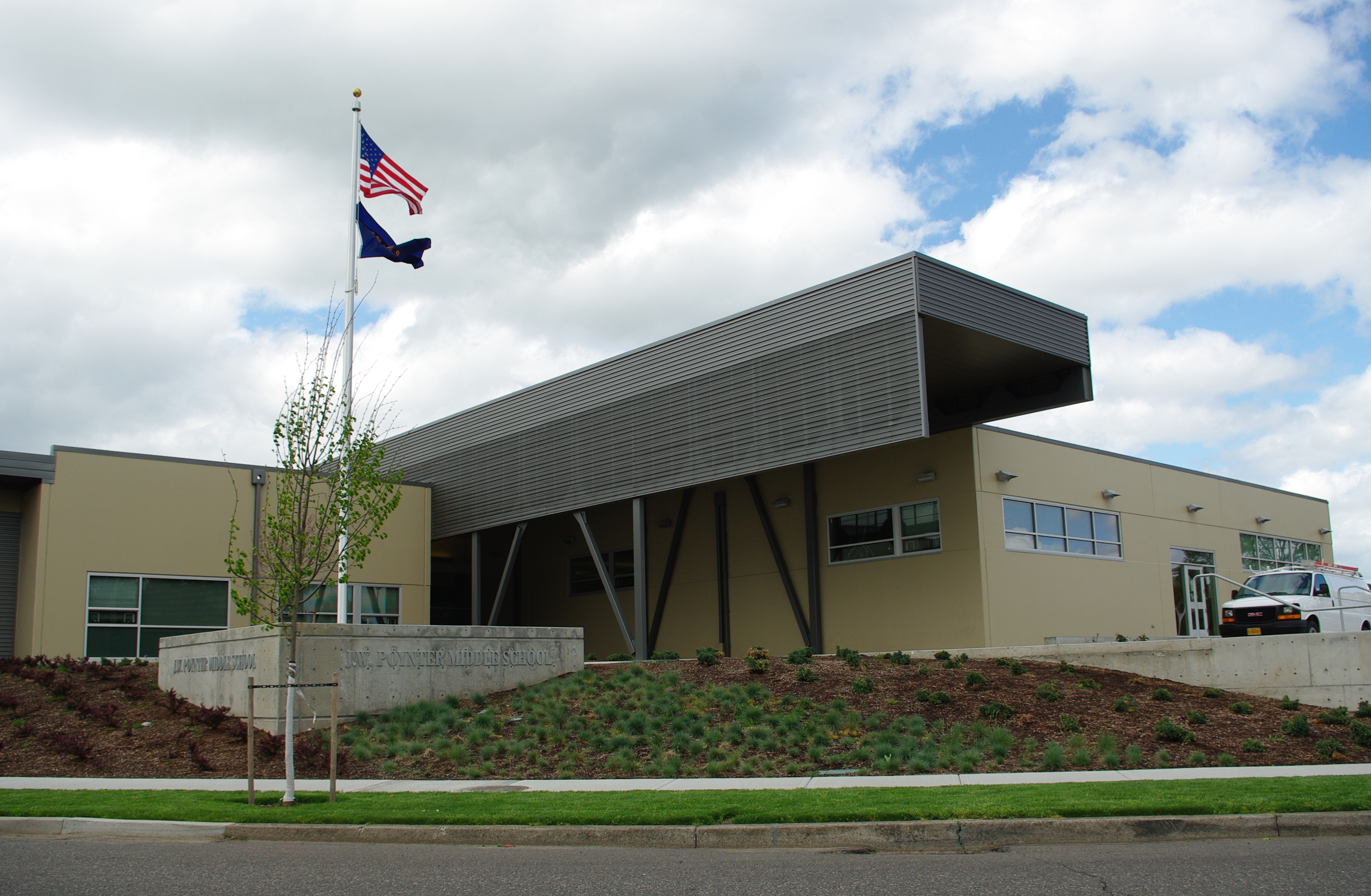
Poynter

Opened in 1960 as Poynter Junior High School, the school now feeds into Liberty High School. The school was built by the then elementary school district, then sold the high school district in 1962 for $772,566 after the high school district expanded to include junior high school grades. Poynter is named after James W. Poynter, who had served as the elementary district's superintendent for 19 years and died in 1958. Elementary schools that feed into the school are Mooberry, Eastwood, Orenco, Lenox, Quatama, and West Union. The school is in the central part of Hillsboro on Grant Street, and abuts Cornell Road. As of 2013, the school had 723 students and had a below average performance rating from the state.

==== South Meadows ====
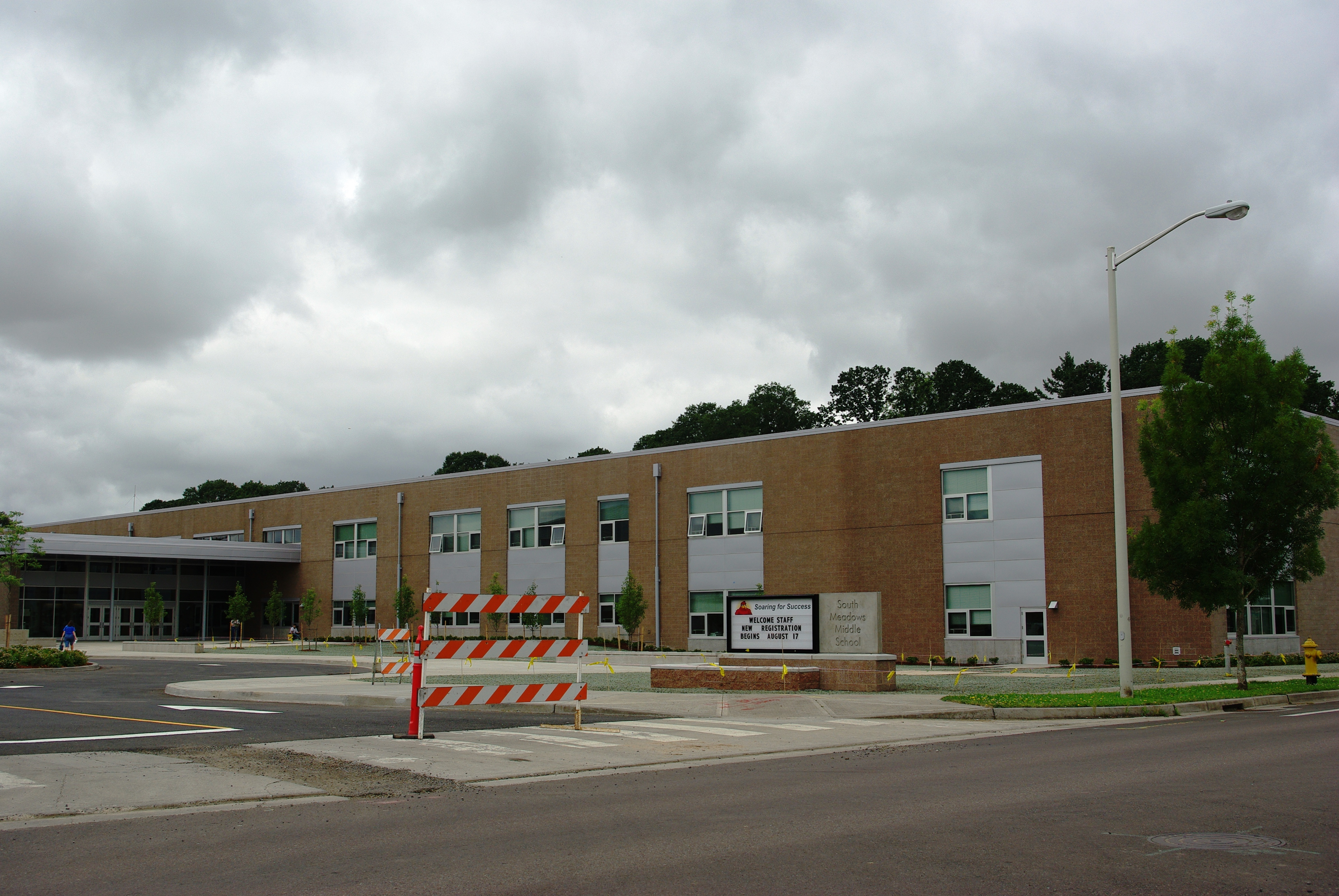
South Meadows

Opened in 2009, the school replaced J. B. Thomas Middle School. The $41 million, two-story school has a capacity of 1,000 students, with enrollment at about 750 when it opened. Silver and light brown in color, the building was paid for from a 2006 bond measure, though Hillsboro's Parks Department provided an additional $500,000 to allow for a larger gym that is utilized by the parks department when school is not in session.

South Meadows is home to the Hawks and feeds students into Hillsboro High School. The school is located in southeast Hillsboro, adjacent to Witch Hazel Elementary. South Meadows is Hillsboro's only school that has the middle school version of the International Baccalaureate program. As of 2013, the school had 747 students and had a below average performance rating from the state. South Meadows receives students from W.L. Henry, Brookwood, Minter Bridge, Farmington View, Groner, Rosedale, and Witch Hazel elementary schools.

=== High schools ===
In order of creation:

- Hillsboro High School (colloquially known as Hilhi) (current campus in 1969)
- Glencoe High School (1980)
- Century High School (1997)
- Liberty High School (2003)

=== Other schools ===
- City View Charter School, with grades K-8
- Hillsboro Online Academy, grades 7-12 with 110 students as of 2013
- Miller Education Center, alternative school with grades 7-12

=== Future Schools ===
The district is additionally planning to construct 3 other elementary schools, a middle school, and a high school in South Hillsboro, pending approval of a future bond measure.

=== Former schools ===
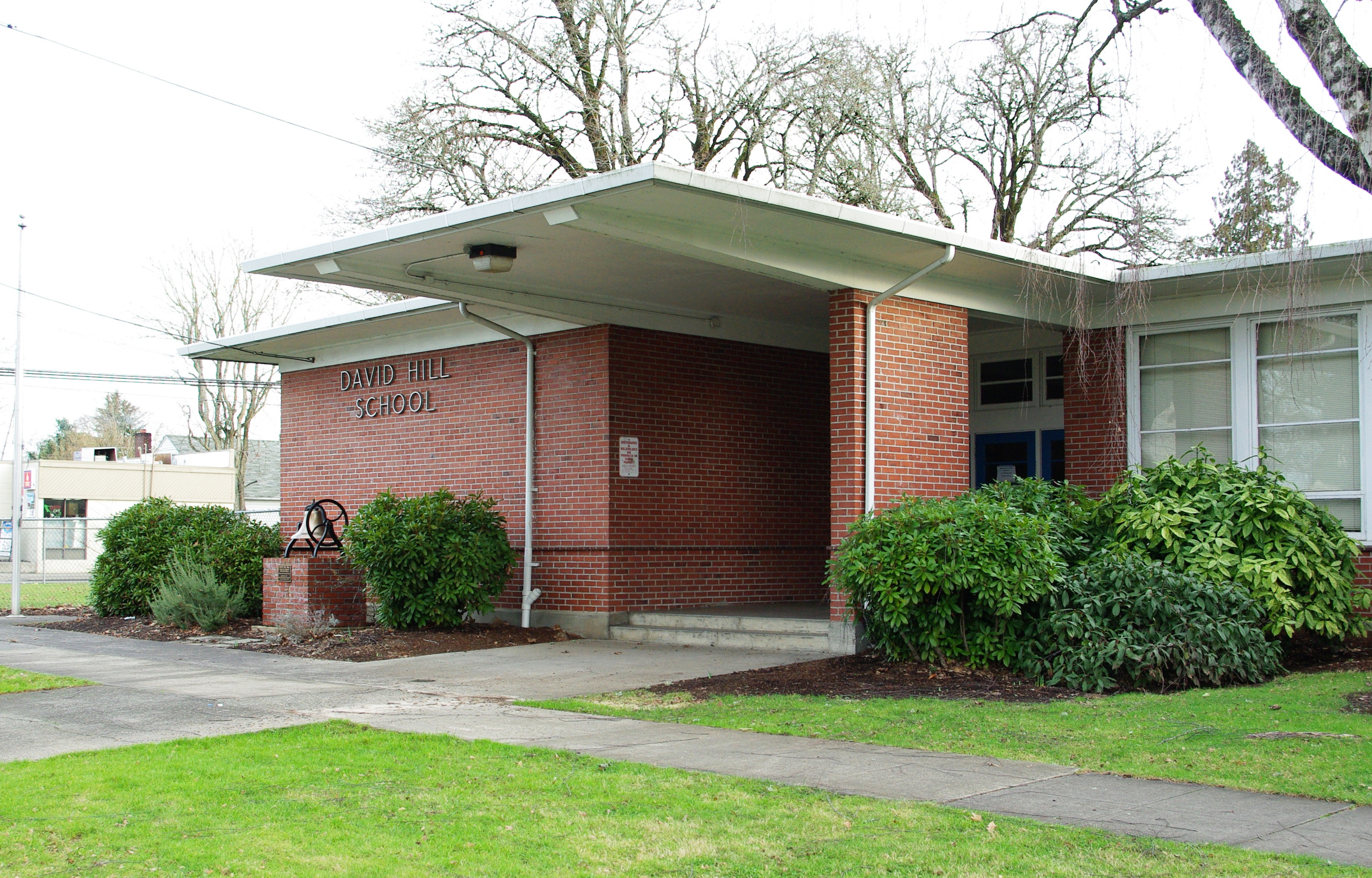
David Hill School

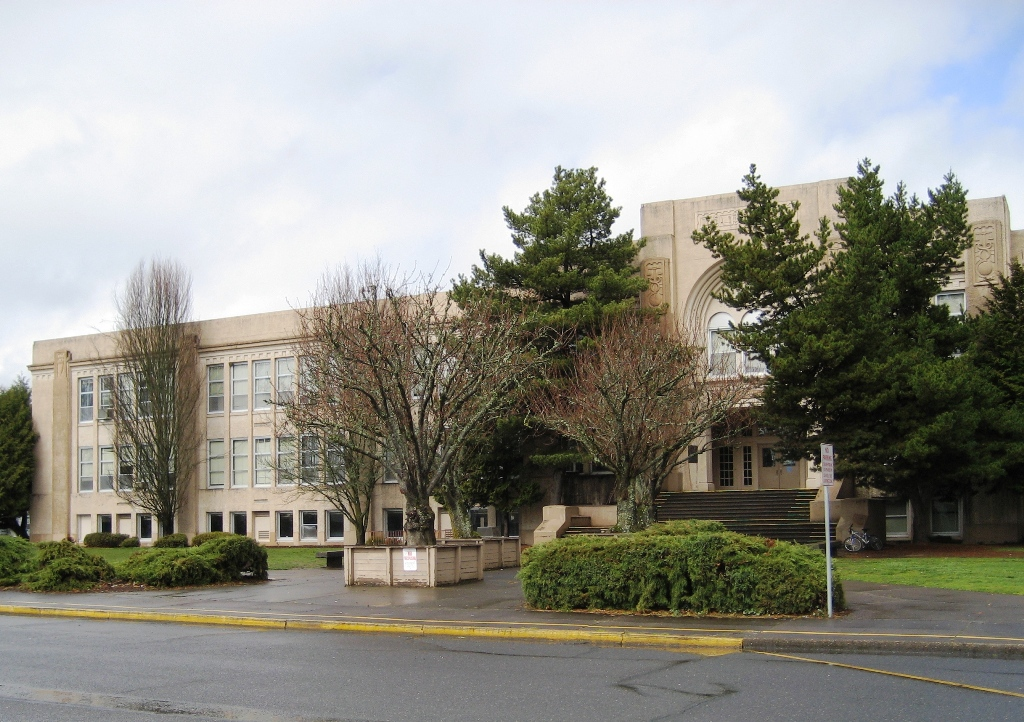
Thomas Middle School

- Barnes Junior High School:
- Peter Boscow Elementary
- David Hill Elementary
- J.B. Thomas Middle/Junior High School: The beige-colored buildings were located on NE 6th Ave and NE Lincoln St. The main school building, the second campus for Hilhi (until 1969), was a three-story structure with 47,096 square feet (4,375.4 m^{2}) of space. The eastern wing was constructed in 1963.

== Dual language program ==
In 2002, the district created a Spanish-English dual language immersion program to address the changing needs of the community it serves. As a response to research showing that native language instruction increases general literacy, community involvement, and graduation rates, the program was first implemented at the elementary level (at W. L. Henry and Minter Bridge) and now extends K-12 in the Hillsboro High School feeder. The district, which as of 2009-2010 enrolled 16% English-language learners, now offers a dual language diploma endorsement, allowing graduates to demonstrate assessed academic proficiency in both English and Spanish.

In neighborhood elementary schools where ELL enrollment is high, early grades are weighted heavily towards the native language. Grade level advancement blends English at an increasing rate in all academic areas (language arts, math, science, etc.), until the overall balance is at approximate parity by middle school. Enrollment is optional, meaning the district will accommodate transfer requests away from entirely dual-language neighborhood schools; conversely, families whose neighborhood schools are not part of the program may request in-district transfer to join.

== See also ==
- List of school districts in Oregon
