= Horace Sumner Lyman =

American journalist, historian and educator

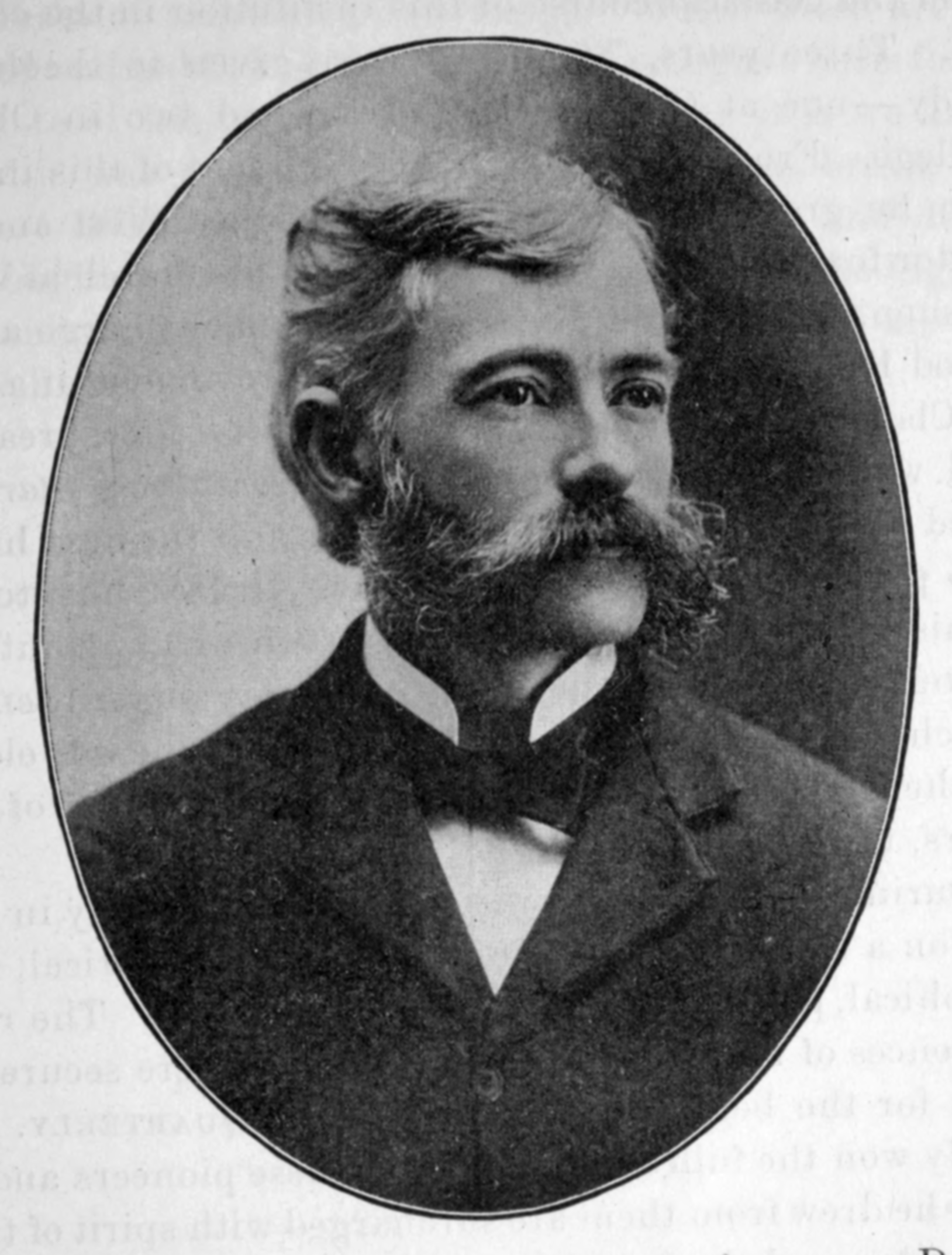
- Born: December 18, 1855
- Died: December 22, 1904 (aged 49)
- Occupations: Journalist, historian, educator
- Family: Horace Lyman (father)

Horace Sumner Lyman (December 18, 1855 – December 22, 1904) was a prominent American journalist, historian, and educator in the U.S. state of Oregon. His father, Horace Lyman, was an Oregon pioneer in 1848.

Lyman served as editor of the Portland Pacific Express starting in 1885 and the Prohibition Star beginning in 1887. He contributed a number of firsthand accounts of Oregon pioneers to the Oregon Historical Quarterly, and published a history of the state in four volumes.
