= Horace Lyman =

American reverend & professor of mathematics (1815-1887)

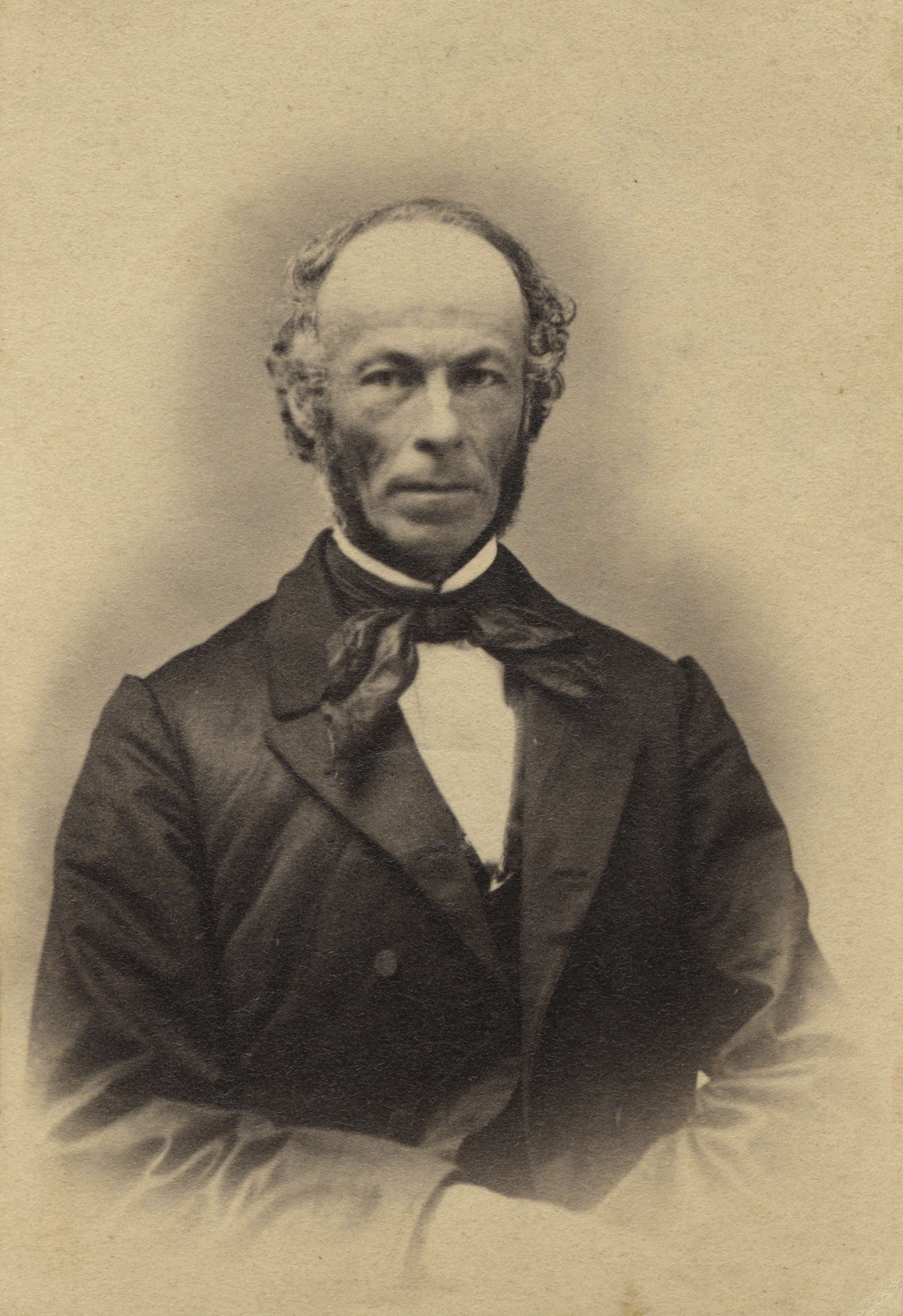
- Born: November 16, 1815; Massachusetts, U.S.
- Died: March 31, 1887 (aged 71); Forest Grove, Oregon, U.S.
- Occupation(s): Reverend, professor
- Family: Horace Sumner Lyman (son)

Horace Lyman (November 16, 1815 – March 31, 1887) was an American reverend and professor of mathematics in the U.S. state of Oregon.

Lyman was born in Massachusetts, and moved to Oregon by way of New York and Cape Horn in October 1848. He married Mary Dennison the next month. He established a school in Portland in 1849, and helped establish the Hillsboro School District in Hillsboro in 1851. He was a founder of Portland's First Congregational Church in June 1851. He was founding secretary of LaCreole Academic Institutue near Dallas, Oregon in 1856.

Lyman served as Hillsboro's first commissioner, and later its school superintendent. He later taught mathematics at Pacific University in Forest Grove, where he died in 1887.

Lyman's son, Horace Sumner Lyman, was a prominent journalist, historian, and educator.
