= Emirichu =

American illustrator and content creator (born 1995)

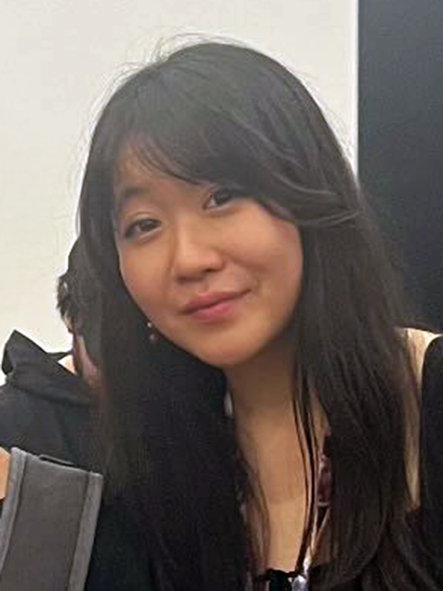
- Sim in 2025
- Born: Emily Sim; August 27, 1995 (age 31)
- Occupations: YouTuber; VTuber; animator; illustrator
- Partner: Daidus

Twitch information
- Channel: emirichuyt
- Years active: 2022–2024
- Genres: Just chatting; art; gaming
- Followers: 107 thousand

YouTube information
- Channel: Emirichu
- Years active: 2017–present
- Subscribers: 3.59 million
- Views: 443.29 million
- Last updated: September 26, 2026

Emily Sim (born August 27, 1995), also known as her pseudonym Emirichu, is an American YouTuber, VTuber, animator, and illustrator based in Japan. She rose to fame in 2017 through story-time animation videos on YouTube, gaining attention with her viral animatic "It's Not Like I Like You!!". Inspired by anime and Studio Ghibli, she returned to drawing after college and later became a VTuber. In 2022, she joined the Japanese talent agency GeeXPlus and moved to Japan, where she now works on art projects, including the traditional art channel Spilled Ink with Daidus.

== Early life and education ==
Emily Sim was born on August 27, 1995, to immigrants from South Korea, and grew up in New York. She became interested in art, especially after watching anime, and was inspired by movies like Hayao Miyazaki’s Kiki's Delivery Service, Princess Mononoke, and Spirited Away from Studio Ghibli. She moved to California when she was 15 years old and began to take drawing more seriously. However, in college, she stopped drawing to focus on becoming a teacher, but after graduating, a friend gave her a drawing tablet as a gift. Later, spending a month at her parents' home in rural South Korea helped her find her creativity again.

== Career ==
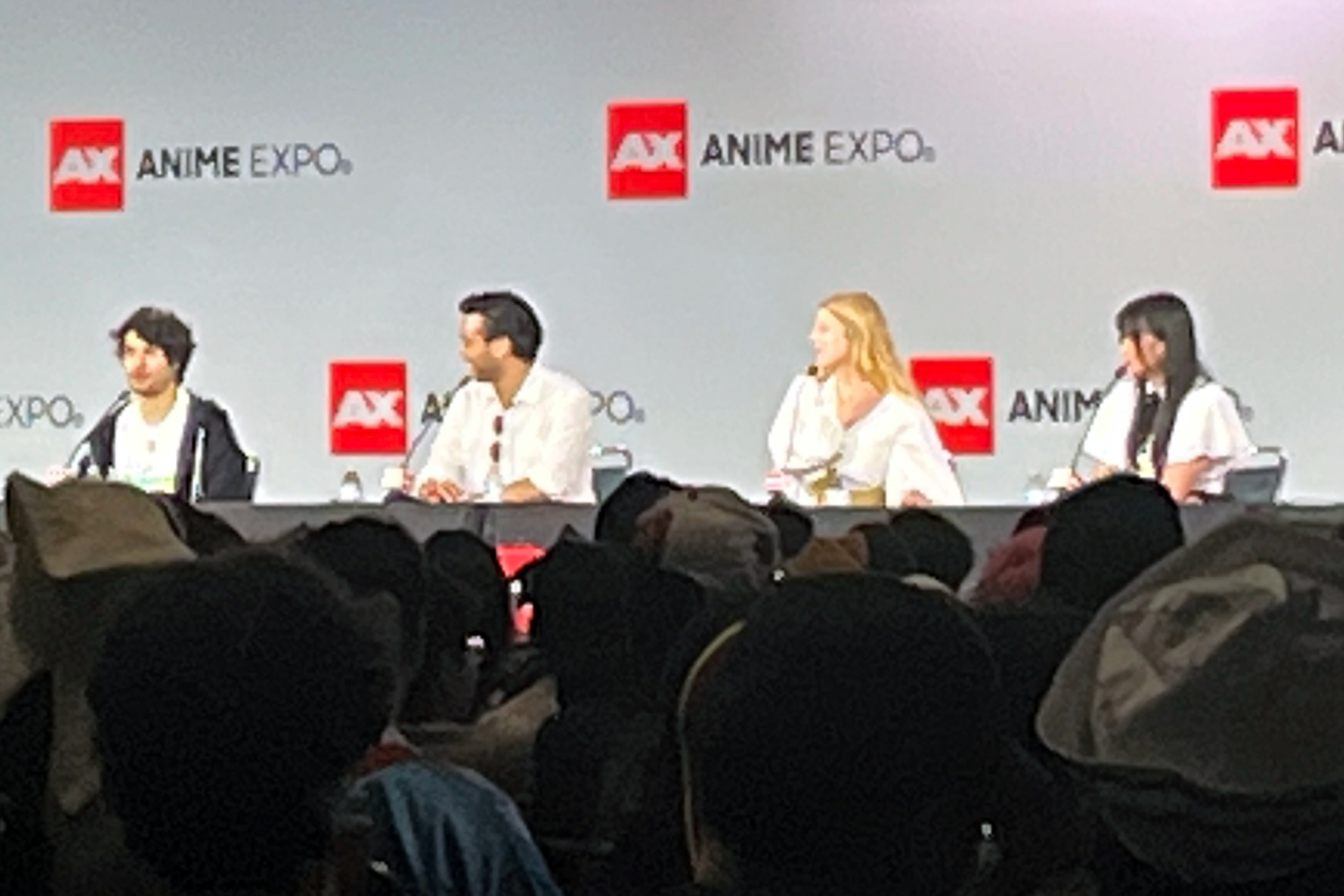
Sim (far right) at the GeeXPlus panel during Anime Expo 2025.

Despite creating her YouTube channel in 2011, she began uploading videos on YouTube in 2017, where she shared stories from her life along with hand-drawn pictures of her friends and adventures. Her first video to go viral was an animatic music video for the Static-P song "It's Not Like I Like You!!" in May 2017, and she gained over 10,000 subscribers after returning from South Korea.

On February 23, 2022, Sim posted a short video on her YouTube channel announcing her debut as a Vtuber, and she made her first appearance on Twitch a few days later. She later said that she had been curious about streaming and becoming a Vtuber, but decided to move forward with it after an artist she liked opened up model commissions, and she wanted to get one made by them. In August 2022, she attended AniManGaki and took part in a guest event alongside artist RandoWis. A month later, Sim and Daidus joined the Japanese talent agency GeeXPlus after the agency contacted Sim through CDawgVA, and they both later moved to Japan.

In June 2023, Sim and Daidus were announced as guests for the 18th edition of Otakuthon. On July 1, 2023, during Anime Expo, Sim was a guest at HoYoVerse's Honkai: Star Rail event along with fellow GeeXPlus creators CDawgVA, Gigguk, and Sydsnap. On August 8, 2023, Sim and Daidus established the YouTube channel Spilled Ink, publishing their first video on May 5, 2024. Through Spilled Ink, the two are able to collaborate with other artists in Japan using traditional art. In December 2024, Sim and Daidus, as part of Spilled Ink, took part in a panel at Comic Fiesta. In July 2025, Sim joined a GeeXPlus panel at Anime Expo with Gigguk, Sydsnap, and The Anime Man, where they talked about content creation in Japan and shared details about new projects. Later that same month, Sim posted a 35-minute YouTube video around her praising the film KPop Demon Hunters, which garnered 450,000 views in a week and a half.

== Personal life ==
Sim lives in Japan with her partner Daidus, who is also a YouTuber and illustrator. On April 1, 2020, Sim posted drawings of their caricatures kissing, leading many to think it was an April Fools' joke, but she later confirmed that they were in a relationship. She previously lived in San Diego, California.

Sim often incorporates strawberries in the designs of both her YouTube branding and her VTuber avatar. She cites Tokyo Mew Mew by Reiko Yoshida and Mia Ikumi as one of her biggest influences, and she is a fan of Fruits Basket by Natsuki Takaya, The Gentlemen's Alliance Cross by Arina Tanemura, Naruto by Masashi Kishimoto, Sailor Moon by Naoko Takeuchi and Kitchen Princess by Miyuki Kobayashi and Natsumi Ando. She has also stated that Nichijou and Cardcaptor Sakura are two of her favourite anime series; one of her favourite anime films is Makoto Shinkai's Your Name. Beyond Japanese anime and manga, Sim is a fan of several American animated series like Avatar: The Last Airbender and Teen Titans.
