= DillonGoo =

American animator

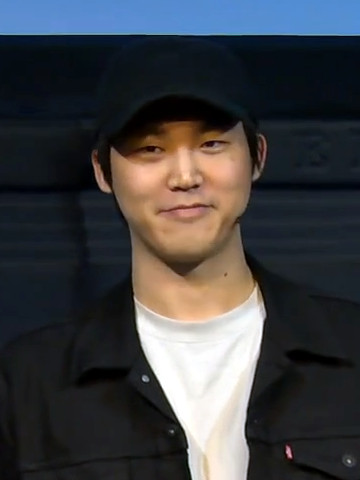
- Gu in 2022
- Born: Dillon Gu
- Occupations: Animator; director; YouTuber; streamer
- Organization: GeeXPlus

Twitch information
- Channel: dillongoo
- Years active: 2013–present
- Genres: Just chatting; animation
- Followers: 16 thousand

YouTube information
- Channel: dillongoo
- Years active: 2012–present
- Subscribers: 1.4 million
- Views: 159 million
- Last updated: September 5, 2025

Dillon Gu, known by his online alias DillonGoo, is an American animator, director, and content creator. He is best known as the lead fight animator for the Rooster Teeth series RWBY starting from season 3 and for his Anime Cats YouTube series, as well as the cyberpunk-themed Genshin Impact fan series Progenitor, as a VTuber under the name Professor Goo, and as the founder of DillonGoo Studios. Through his studio, he has developed engines for Blender and collaborated with the Blender Foundation, as well as Blizzard Entertainment, HoYoVerse, Yostar, Gryphline, Kuro Games, and Hololive Production, in addition to creating the 3D animated web series Soul Mart in 2025. He is a partner of the Blender Foundation since 2024 and is also an affiliate of the Kadokawa-backed agency GeeXPlus since 2025.

== Career ==
=== 2012–2024: Early career ===
Before pursuing a career in animation, he majored in computer science. He subsequently joined Rooster Teeth to work on RWBY before eventually returning to independent animation. Starting in 2017, DillonGoo created KatsuWatch, an animated web series which features Overwatch characters depicted as cats, with Blizzard Entertainment commissioning him for an animation related to Ana's Bastet Challenge, where Ana Amari is shown fighting crime while dressed as a cat. Additionally, Gu created an animation of Baptiste as a cat, nicknamed "Catiste", as well as an animation for Widowmaker. In 2022, DillonGoo Studios released the Goo Engine, a custom build of Blender designed specifically for use in 3D anime production which also serves as the studio's in-house version of Blender. In November 2023, DillonGoo Studios launched Emily, an anime-style 3D rig for Blender. Following this, Gu created a hand macro control rig in Blender in May 2024.

=== 2024–present: Continued success and Soul Mart ===
In March 2024, following Rooster Teeth's announcement of its impending shutdown, Gu expressed interest in acquiring the intellectual property of RWBY to continue its run. He went viral in November 2024 after retweeting a video of a cosplayer dressed as Link from The Legend of Zelda, who was struggling to unsheathe a sword from their back. He tweeted a video demonstrating how the sword could be drawn from the side instead of the back opening.

DillonGoo has also collaborated with HoYoVerse and therefore made a number of Genshin Impact-themed animations for the HoYoFair program starting with the animated short "Nameless Road" in 2022, followed by the cyberpunk-themed Progenitor web series, among the works featured include the Fontaine-themed The Last Bakery in 2023, as well as the fourth episode of the web series If Genshin had a Cyberpunk Anime: Progenitor in 2024, which was featured in the HoYoFair program that year to coincide with the fourth anniversary of the game.

In December 2024, Gu and DillonGoo Studios announced their partnership with the Blender Foundation to assist with new Blender releases and the development of non-photorealistic rendering features.

In May 2025, Gu announced that he had joined the Kadokawa-owned Japanese talent agency GeeXPlus. Two months later, in July 2025, during a GeeXPlus panel at the Anime Expo following the announcement of GeeXProduction, DillonGoo, along with GeeXPlus members Gigguk and OtakuVs, announced their projects, in which DillonGoo announced his 3D animated web series Soul Mart. In an interview with Anime News Network, Gu stated that he wanted to demonstrate to a Western audience that animation is not solely for children or adults, but can occupy a middle ground. He also mentioned his interest in experimenting with the integration of 2D elements within 3D animation within the series.

== Filmography ==
=== Short films ===
| Year | Title | Role | Notes | Source |
|---|---|---|---|---|
| 2012 | Drunken Boxing | Director, animator | DillonGoo's first animation. A Minecraft animated short. | |
| 2012 | Gods Don't Bleed | Director, animator | Minecraft animated short | |
| 2012 | The Danu Talisman | Director, producer, animator | Minecraft animated short film. | |
| 2013 | Beat Boxing | Director, animator | Minecraft animation that is the sequel to Drunken Boxing. | |
| 2013 | Ionia: The Blood Moon | Director, producer, editor | League of Legends - themed fight animation featuring cinematics. | |
| 2016 | Katsu Cats | Director, animator | A short film featuring animated cats. Won the 2016 Suzanne Awards's Best Animation award. | |
| 2016 | Hardcore Herobrine | Director, animator | Minecraft animated short film. | |
| 2019 | Demon Slayer CATS | Director, animator | A Demon Slayer-inspired fan animation which features animated cats. | |
| 2020 | CyberKatsu: Recoded | Director, writer, animator | An animated short made for DillonGoo's Blender animation course. | |
| 2021 | CyberKatsu: 2 | Director, writer, animator | Sequel to CyberKatsu: Recoded. | |
| 2022 | THE ANTIVIRUS: Emily's Final Fight | Director, writer | An animated short that features fight scenes while also showcasing Goo Engine's features. | |
| 2022 | Nameless Road | Director, writer, lead animator | DillonGoo's first Genshin Impact animation featured on the HoYoFair program | |
| 2023 | Legend of Chongyue | Director, writer, producer | Arknights-themed animation commissioned by Yostar | |
| 2023 | The Last Bakery | Animator, director | Genshin Impact (Fontaine-themed) animation seen on the HoYoFair program | |
| 2024 | Unsheathed Resolve | Director, producer | A Punishing: Gray Raven-themed animated short film produced in association with Kuro Games | |
| 2024 | Mischief Managed | Director, producer | Honkai: Star Rail animated bonus scene made for the HoYoFair program's S.P.A.R.K.L.E Star Rail Jazznight event | |
| 2024 | Fight for My Soul | Executive producer | Heaven Burns Red animation commissioned by Yostar | |
| 2024 | Shukra Reborn | Producer | A Punishing: Gray Raven-themed animated short film produced in association with Kuro Games | |
| 2025 | In Another Life | Director | Honkai: Star Rail animated music video seen on the HoYoFair program | |
| 2025 | Klukai Finally Lets Loose | Director, writer, producer, lead animator | GFL2-themed animation created in association with MICA team | |
| 2025 | Carlotta vs Cantarella | Director | Wuthering Waves animation made for the Solaris Seaside Story program | |
| 2026 | Galbrena vs Augusta | Director, writer | Wuthering Waves animation made for the Solaris Supercup™ Series program. | |
| 2026 | Time for a Drink | Director, writer | Gryphline-commissioned Endfield animation. | |
| 2026 | Too Many Void Hunters | Director, writer | Zenless Zone Zero animation seen on the HoYoFair program | |
| 2026 | Pacific Impact | Director, writer | Genshin Impact animation seen on the HoYoFair program which takes inspiration from Pacific Rim. | |

=== Web series ===
| Year | Title | Role | Notes | Source |
|---|---|---|---|---|
| 2015–2016 | RWBY | Animator, fight choreographer | Volume 3 only | |
| 2017–2019 | KatsuWatch | Animator, director | Features Overwatch characters depicted as cats | |
| 2018–2019 | UNLEASHED | Animator, director | Features various anime characters, including those from Overwatch, doing fight animations. | |
| 2023–2025 | Progenitor | Animator, director | Cyberpunk-themed Genshin Impact animated web series seen on the HoYoFair program | |
| TBA | Soul Mart | Animator, director | First animated series created in association with GeeXProduction | |

=== Miscellaneous ===
| Year | Title | Role | Notes | Source |
|---|---|---|---|---|
| 2024 | Time to Feast | Director, writer, lead animator | Animated music videos made for Ironmouse. | |
| 2025 | Hell Again | Director, writer | Animated music videos made for Ironmouse. | |
| 2025 | Cash App asked us to make an anime... | Director, writer | An animated commercial created in association with Cash App. | |
| 2026 | My car is in danger | Director, writer | Animated music video made for IRyS. | |
