= Bâan: The Boundary of Adulthood =

Japanese anime short film

- Key visual poster

Japanese name
- Kanji: bâan – 大人の彊界
Transcriptions
- Revised Hepburn: Bâan – Otona no Kyōkai
- Directed by: Yoshimitsu Ōhashi
- Screenplay by: Megumi Hosaka
- Story by: Garnt Maneetapho
- Produced by: Garnt Maneetapho
- Starring: Haruna Mikawa; Shōya Ishige
- Music by: Kevin Penkin
- Production companies: GeeXPlus; Studio Daisy
- Release date: 24 August 2025 (Japan)
- Running time: 19 minutes
- Country: Japan
- Language: Japanese

Bâan: The Boundary of Adulthood (Note: "Bâan" is the romanization of the Thai word บ้าน meaning "home".) (Japanese: bâan – 大人の彊界, Hepburn: Bâan – Otona no Kyōkai) is a 2025 Japanese animated fantasy short film produced by Studio Daisy and GeeXPlus. The film is directed by Yoshimitsu Ōhashi and based on an original story by Garnt Maneetapho (Gigguk), with music composed by Kevin Penkin, and is one of the first projects to be created in association with GeeXProduction. The film premiered theatrically in Tokyo on 24 August 2025, and later premiered on Gigguk's YouTube channel on 20 September 2025.

== Plot ==
Set in both modern-day Japan and the fictional world of Euthania, which are connected by a warp gate, the story follows two characters on their respective journeys. Rinrada Ratchamanee leaves her village in Euthania to travel to Japan, while Daichi Arai leaves Japan for Euthania following personal conflicts with his family. Euthania is depicted as having a mild and peaceful climate, inhabited by various fantasy races, but also home to dangerous creatures such as large monsters.

== Characters ==
Rinrada Ratchamanee (リンラダ・ラチャマニー, Rinrada Rachamanī; Thai: รินรดา รัชมณี)
Voiced by: Haruna Mikawa (Japanese); Sydney Poniewaz (English)
Rinrada is a young woman, an orphan from a young age, who feels a strong desire to live independently and decides to leave Euthania to pursue her own path.
Daichi Arai (新居 大地, Arai Daichi)
Voiced by: Shōya Ishige (Japanese); Aleks Le (English)
Daichi is a young man who chooses to leave Japan, where his overprotective parents reside, for Euthania in search of a freer and more independent life.
An (アン, An)
Voiced by: Hitomi Nabatame (Japanese); Erin Nicole Lundquist (English)
A friend of both Riranda and Daichi. She first appears on Earth watching over Rinrada with her dog Mocchi, holding onto an item after confirming that she is doing alright. She continues to watch over Rinrada as An becomes pregnant, growing increasingly worried.
Some time later, during the winter, she invites Rinrada to her home, where she lives with her daughter and human husband. The two discuss how Rinrada has been living, with her admitting that Daichi inspired her to move and that she wasn't planning to stay long. She also gives Rinrada a phone containing a message from Daichi.
A younger version of her appears with Daichi, initially providing him with supplies and later tasting his cooking while introducing him to their culture and lifestyle.
Daichi's Mother
Voiced by: Riho Sugiyama (Japanese); Hannah Grace (English)
Daichi's overprotective mother. At the beginning of the film, she texts Daichi after he leaves home and searches through his laptop, discovering a video promotion for Euthania. She attempts to text and call him to bring him home before he teleports through the gate.
In a brief flashback, she is seen cooking for a younger Daichi, who later reminisces that he wanted to cook with her. It is revealed near the middle of the film that she and his father run a clinic, which Daichi is reluctant to work at. During the end credits, she is seen with her husband receiving Daichi's phone from Rinrada.

== Production ==
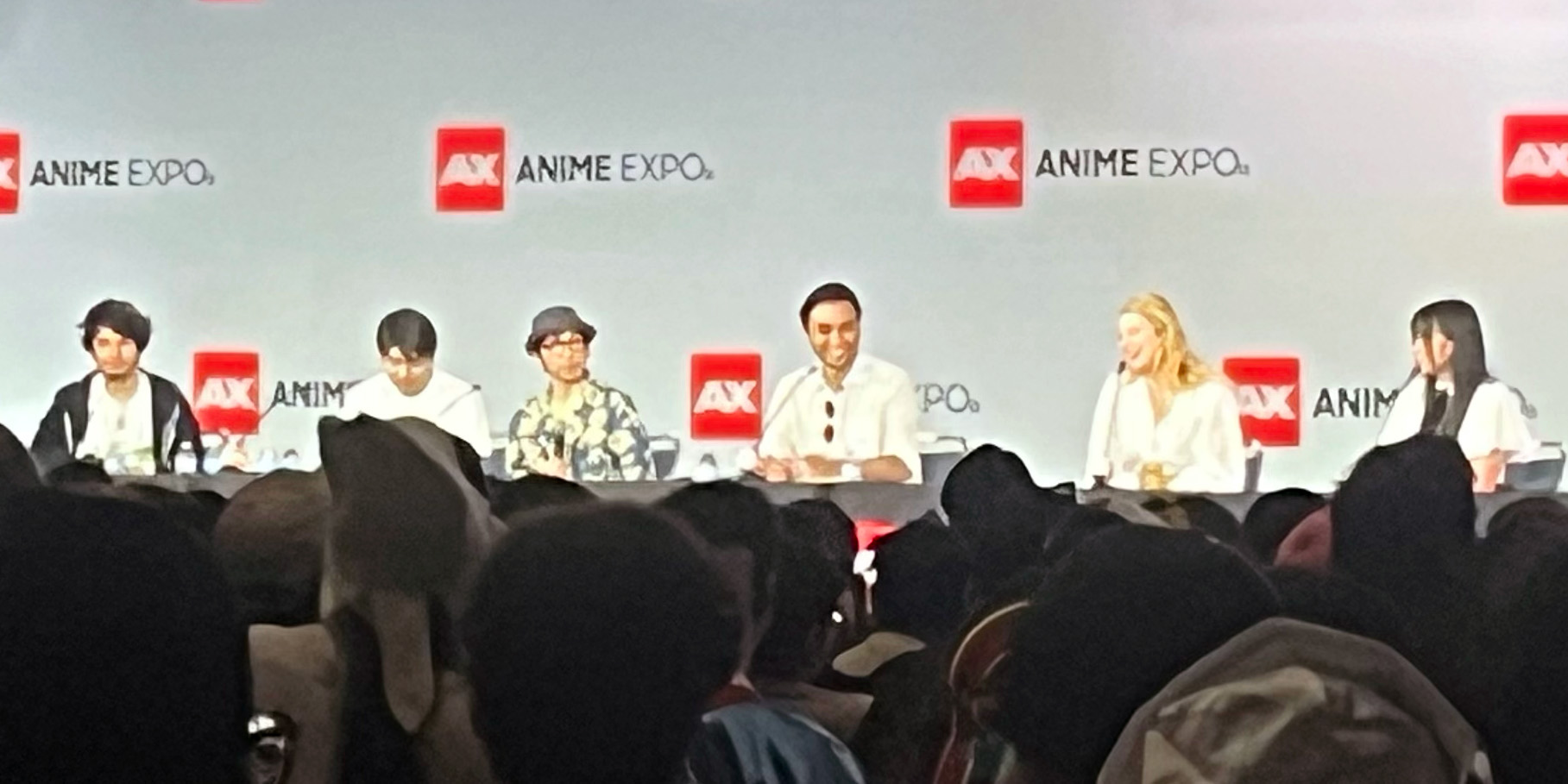
Maneetapho and Ōhashi (center two) during the announcement of Bâan at Anime Expo 2025

=== Background ===
In an interview with The Japan Times, Maneetapho stated that he first realized he could create his own film after watching the music video for "Shelter" by Porter Robinson and Madeon, produced by A-1 Pictures and Crunchyroll, which he had previously praised upon its release. On his podcast Trash Taste, Maneetapho explained that Bâan was a fully independent production with no plans to develop it into a larger franchise. He funded the project entirely with his own money, even doubling the budget when necessary, and took on additional sponsorships for his YouTube videos to support the film. Maneetapho also shared that he initially pitched the concept as an isekai story first to Kadokawa and later to Studio Daisy, explaining that while developing the work, he drew inspiration from themes of cultural identity and the struggle to find one's place while writing the film. In an interview with Japanese entertainment website Natalie, he shared that having lived in many countries and experienced a variety of cultures, he often found it difficult to understand the concept of home. During the writing process, he listened to others, including his wife, Sydney Poniewaz, and industry veterans, to guide him on various aspects of the film. The film marks the first time that GeeXPlus has produced an anime, as the company entered the animation business in response to a growing number of employees with extensive knowledge of anime among its video distributors. The world of Euthania was inspired by both Thai folklore and Southeast Asian mythology.

=== Development ===
On 3 July 2025, during a panel at Anime Expo, Maneetapho announced the production of Bâan, with the film being produced by Studio Daisy and directed by Yoshimitsu Ōhashi. Kevin Penkin was confirmed to compose the film's music. The project was introduced as part of GeeXPlus's new production division, GeeXProductions, alongside other titles. It was also revealed that Japanese voice actors Haruna Mikawa and Shōya Ishige will voice the characters Rinrada Ratchamanee and Daichi Arai, respectively. Maneetapho's wife, Sydney Poniewaz, who was also present at the panel, was announced as the English voice actress for Ratchamanee. While developing the character of Rinrada Ratchamanee, Maneetapho described her as the "child" of himself and Sydney Poniewaz, explaining that she embodied Poniewaz's energy and his own insecurities. On 24 August 2025, he announced that the English dub features Aleks Le as the voice of Daichi, with Trash Taste co-host Connor Colquhoun serving as the ADR director and J-pop singer Diana Garnet as the English localization producer.

== Release ==
The film premiered at Grand Cinema Sunshine in Toshima, Japan on 24 August 2025, and was later released on Maneetapho's YouTube channel on 20 September 2025, accompanied by a behind-the-scenes documentary. The YouTube release features both a Japanese dub and an English dub. On the same day as the theatrical premiere, Maneetapho announced that there would also be a launch party hosted on his Twitch account to celebrate.

== Reception ==
In a review for Anime News Network, Richard Eisenbeis gave the film an overall rating of B, describing Bâan as an "emotionally resonate short film that twists the isekai formula to show the choice all expats must one day face." He noted that while the theme was strong and emotionally impactful, the film prioritizes the story it wants to tell over logical consistency, calling this "the singular blemish on an otherwise excellent short film." Josh Piedra of The Outer Haven gave the film three stars out of five, praising the animation and soundtrack, as well as the pacing considering its short length. However, he noted that some of the English voice acting did not reach the same high quality. Timothy Blake Donohoo of Comic Book Resources described the film as a "breathtaking piece" that "quickly captures the essence of the potential within the isekai genre", noting that its quality and story could unseat Solo Leveling as the best new anime of 2025.

== Media ==
=== Music ===
On 9 July, Maneetapho posted a preview of the film's soundtrack titled "Khlui" on X (formerly Twitter) and later explained that the title shares its name with the traditional Thai bamboo flute and noted that it was his mother's favorite instrument. On 25 September, Kevin Penkin announced that the original soundtrack of the film, Bâan -Otona no Kyōkai- Original SoundTrack -, was released on Spotify, Apple Music, and YouTube.

=== Merchandise ===
At Anime Expo, exclusive merchandise from Bâan and other GeeXPlus projects was available for pre-order at a dedicated booth. The merchandise will be produced and sold by Nonsense, a brand owned by Joey Bizinger, who is also Maneetapho's co-host on the Trash Taste podcast. On 20 September, Maneetapho announced the release of the first merchandise for the film to support it.
