= CaptainSparklez =

American YouTuber (born 1992)

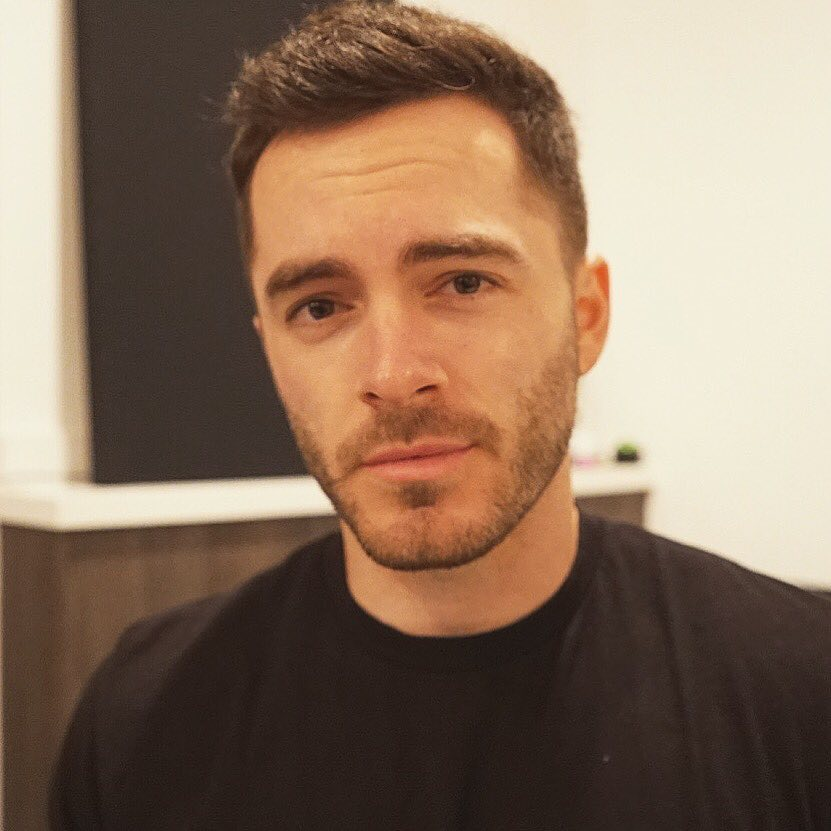
- Maron in 2018
- Born: Jordan Maron; February 10, 1992 (age 34); Los Angeles, California, U.S.
- Education: University of California, Santa Barbara (Dropped out)
- Occupations: YouTuber; Twitch streamer
- Organization(s): Maker Studios; WME; PocketWatch; GeeXPlus

YouTube information
- Channel: CaptainSparklez
- Years active: 2010–present
- Genres: Let's Plays; vlogging
- Subscribers: 11.4 million
- Views: 4.18 billion
- Last updated: September 12, 2026

Jordan Maron (born February 10, 1992), known online as CaptainSparklez, is an American YouTuber and Twitch streamer mainly known for his Minecraft videos. As of August 2026, his main YouTube channel has over 11.4 million subscribers.

In 2010, eighteen-year-old Maron created his first YouTube channel to upload Call of Duty gameplay videos. Later that year, he moved to a new channel named CaptainSparklez and started posting Minecraft videos soon after. Maron joined Justin.tv in 2011, where he live streamed a variety of games; he continued to stream on Twitch after the two platforms were merged. On YouTube, he began to develop a fanbase from his Minecraft-themed music videos and then-daily gameplay. He was also popular on Twitch to a lesser extent. At the end of 2011, Maron was successful enough to become a full-time YouTuber. CaptainSparklez reached one million subscribers in early 2012. Maron has been involved in other projects, including a mobile game company and an athleisure line. After thirteen years, Maron decided to stop uploading Minecraft gameplay content on his main channel in December 2023. He later became an affiliate of the Kadokawa-backed agency GeeXPlus in 2026, which he announced via a Q&A session.

Maron is best known for the Minecraft-themed songs and song parodies he created in collaboration with vocalist TryHardNinja. Their animated music videos are the most viewed on his channel and, for a time in the early 2010s, were the most viewed Minecraft videos on YouTube: "Revenge", a parody of "DJ Got Us Fallin' in Love", received three Guinness World Records, including the one for the most watched Minecraft YouTube video. (Note: Guinness World Records last updated these three records on July 21, 2016.)

== Early life and education ==
Jordan Maron was born in Los Angeles on February 10, 1992. His parents, who were never married, separated when he was very young. His mother later married another man. Maron spent most of his time with his mother, with whom he moved to Santa Barbara when he was around four. Before university, Maron attended Santa Barbara Senior High School. Maron then went on to pursue higher education at the University of California, Santa Barbara as a chemical engineering major, but switched to computer science during his freshman year because he realized that video games could be a viable career. After the first quarter of his sophomore year, Maron decided that he was doing well enough on YouTube to drop out.

== Internet career ==
Inspired by gaming YouTubers, Maron asked his mother for a PC capture card for his eighteenth birthday. That month, in February 2010, he created his first YouTube channel, ProsDONTtalkSHIT, to upload Call of Duty videos and "show off" his scores. The channel was small and only earned around ten thousand views per video. Maron decided to find a less vulgar username in case it grew bigger, although he was not confident it would. On July 20, 2010, Maron created a new channel, which he named CaptainSparklez on a dare. He was introduced to Minecraft by another YouTuber named SeaNanners before it would see widespread success on the Internet the following year. Although Maron was skeptical, he decided to start making Minecraft videos; he posted his first gameplay video (Let's Play) of the game in August.

Despite promising his parents otherwise, Maron became more involved in making YouTube videos after he started university. He began livestreaming his gameplay on Justin.tv in 2011. The platform's gaming content was later migrated to Twitch, where he continued streaming. Maron started doing YouTube full-time in December after it became possible to monetize his videos. He developed a fanbase partly from his then daily Let's Plays, and, in April 2012, his channel reached one million subscribers. In September 2013, CaptainSparklez became the fifth solo gaming channel to pass one billion views. (Note: YouTube personalities PewDiePie, SkyDoesMinecraft, UberHaxorNova and TobyGames were among the other four to reach the milestone.) Maron signed to talent agency William Morris Endeavor (WME) in 2015. In 2016, Maron and four other YouTubers voiced their Minecraft avatars in the sixth episode of the spin-off game Minecraft: Story Mode. In September 2026, in a Q&A session, he confirmed that he had joined the Kadokawa-owned Japanese talent agency GeeXPlus. (Note: CaptainSparklez 2 (September 24, 2026). Japan Move Q&A – via YouTube. "Are you going to be a GeeXPlus creator? I'm not sure what you mean by that. Like, they are a talent agency, which I am with now. So like, I guess, yes.")

=== Content ===
Maron is best known for his Minecraft content on YouTube. His gameplay videos are the focus of his main YouTube channel, while he uses his Twitch livestreams to try out new games, where he has a smaller audience. He uploads other types of Minecraft content, such as music videos, as well as fitness content. Maron previously uploaded once or twice every day, scattering more highly produced videos between his gameplay content. He has created ten additional channels. In December 2023, Maron announced he was retiring from uploading Minecraft gameplay content on his main YouTube channel. Since, he has mostly focused on live-streamed series on his "CaptainSparklez2" channel, such as The Flight SMP and LifeSteal World.

==== Minecraft songs ====
Maron is known for his Minecraft animated music videos. "Revenge" (pictured) is his most viewed video and set three Guinness World Records.

Maron is especially known for the Minecraft-themed songs he produced and uploaded to his channel. The Wall Street Journal dubbed him "the godfather of Minecraft song parodies" because of his status in the fandom. In the early 2010s, his animated music videos made up the most viewed Minecraft videos on YouTube, and the most viewed videos on his channel. While many of the songs were Minecraft-themed parodies of popular songs at the time, his team has also created original music. The animation is spearheaded by the pseudonymous Bootstrap Buckaroo, and the vocals by Igor Gordienko, who creates video game-based songs online as TryHardNinja. His songs are primarily high tempo synth and electronic music.

On August 19, 2011, Maron uploaded "Revenge", a Minecraft-themed parody of Usher's "DJ Got Us Fallin' in Love", to YouTube. As of April 2026 the music video has over 306 million views and is his most viewed video. It is sung from the perspective of a player who is attacked by creepers. This was then followed up by a parody of "Gangnam Style" titled "Minecraft Style" in October 2012, which also went viral. Maron's parody of Taio Cruz's "Dynamite", titled "TNT", surpassed the UK music video for the original song in view count in April 2019. Later that year, "Revenge" received renewed attention as an internet meme which challenged group chats to type the lyrics one-by-one and in order.

From 2012 to 2022, Maron released five interconnected Minecraft music videos which form the main Fallen Kingdom series. "Fallen Kingdom" is a parody of Coldplay's "Viva la Vida" sung from the perspective of a king who loses his castle, while "Take Back the Night" debuted at No. 2 on the Billboard Dance/Electronic Songs chart because of its YouTube views. The storyline continued with "Find the Pieces", "Dragonhearted", and "Rising Kingdom". In 2017, Maron collaborated with producers Seven Lions, Illenium, and Said the Sky, and vocalist Haliene for "Rush Over Me".

== Other ventures ==
=== Mobile games ===
Maron and Activision co-founder Howard Marks co-founded mobile game company XREAL. Marks first contacted him through a mutual friend of his grandmother. They released their first game in May 2015 for iOS and Android. In Fortress Fury, players craft weapons and items to build tile-based 2D fortresses before attempting to destroy others' in real-time multiplayer battles. Fortress Fury was developed by a contracted studio, but the production moved internally after its launch. The studio aspired to create games for a potential mobile esports scene.

Fortress Fury was originally going to be titled Fortress Fallout until ZeniMax Media, the parent company of Fallout series developer Bethesda Softworks, sent a cease and desist letter to XREAL ordering them to rescind a trademark application for the game and cease using the title in future promotional material. Both Maron and several media outlets believed that it was unlikely the drastically different mobile game would be associated with the franchise. However, the small company lacked the resources to fight ZeniMax. Maron said in a later video that the letter was sent to prevent competition for their mobile game Fallout Shelter (2015), which Bethesda kept a secret until its release.

Fortress Fury was downloaded over two million times in its first three months, but did not make a proportional amount of revenue or enter the 200 top-grossing iOS games in the United States. Tasos Lazarides of TouchArcade suggested that this was because of Maron's attempt to make the game player-friendly by lessening in-game purchases, as well as the competitive App Store market, while Stuart Dredge of The Guardian speculated it was because many of his followers were children. Maron let his followers vote on the title, logo, and icon art. (Note: His fans chose both the original name Fortress Fallout and the renamed Fortress Fury.)

=== Merchandise and partnerships ===
Maron signed a partnership deal to Maker Studios' Polaris in 2013. After signing a similar deal with PocketWatch in 2017, Maron received an equity stake in the company and was one of the children's content creators featured in their first book, titled Watch This Book, which was released the following year.

A CaptainSparklez action figure was part of the initial Minecraft-themed Tube Heroes line, which was released on May 22, 2015. In February 2020, Maron launched an athleisure clothing brand called Quality Content.

=== MC Championship ===
Maron competed in the MC Championship tournament, playing in every event since its first event in November 2019. He won his first tournament in May 2022.

== Awards and recognition ==
"Revenge" set the Guinness World Records for the most watched Minecraft YouTube video, the most watched machinima on YouTube, and the most viewed fan film based on a video game. In 2015, Maron and SethBling uploaded Verizon-sponsored videos demonstrating a working phone in Minecraft, which holds the Guinness World Record for the first working mobile phone in Minecraft. The server-client architecture instantly converts the phone software onto in-game blocks, using a web application developed by Verizon, Blockworks and Wieden+Kennedy called Boxel. In 2016, Maron was listed on the Forbes 30 Under 30 in Games and was nominated for the Shorty Award in Gaming.

== Personal life ==
In October 2015, Maron received media attention after he purchased a mansion above the Sunset Strip for $4.5 million. He moved to Pasadena, California, in 2023. In November 2026, Maron announced that he is moving to Japan as a result of joining the agency GeeXPlus.

== Appearances ==
Year	Work	Role	Note(s)	Ref(s).
2015	Wonder Quest	Himself	Web series	
2015	Gamer's Guide to Pretty Much Everything	Himself	Guest	
2016	Bad Internet		Web series	
2016	MatPat's Game Lab	Himself	Web series	
2016	Minecraft: Story Mode	Himself	Video game, episode: "A Portal to Mystery"	
2016	Happy Wheels: The Series	Stephen (Business Guy)		
2017 - 2018	Sugar Pine 7	Himself	Web series	
2025	Animation vs. Minecraft Shorts	Himself	Guest, episode: "Bedwars"	
