= BookWalker =

Japanese e-book platform

Book☆Walker
- Company type: Subsidiary
- Website type: E-commerce
- Founded: December 1, 2005; 20 years ago
- Headquarters: Chiyoda, Tokyo, Japan
- Area served: Worldwide
- Founder: Kadokawa Corporation
- Key people: Ichiro Hashiba (president and CEO)
- Industry: Publishing, E-books
- Products: Manga, Light novels, Magazines
- Parent: Dwango
- Subsidiaries: Trista; ComicWalker
- Website: bookwalker.jp
- Commercial: Yes
- Registration: Required
- Launched: December 3, 2010; 15 years ago
- Current status: Active

BookWalker (ブックウォーカー), stylized as Book☆Walker and BOOK☆WALKER, is a Japanese e-book store that sells manga, light novels, and magazines from various publishers, as well as a few published by themselves. It is based in Chiyoda, Tokyo and was created by Kadokawa Corporation. The company was founded in 2005 before launching their store in Japan in 2010 and internationally in 2014, in which year a webtoon-focused mobile application counterpart, ComicWalker, (Note: ComicWalker changed its name to Kadocomi (カドコミ) in December 2023.) was also launched.

== History ==
BookWalker was founded as Kadokawa Mobile Co., Ltd. on December 3, 2005, by the Kadokawa Corporation. On December 1, 2009, it was renamed to Kadokawa Content Gate Co., Ltd. In December 2010, the service was launched on iOS in Japan under the name Book☆Walker. An Android app and a PC website followed in April 2011 and December 2011 respectively. On July 1, 2010, the company was renamed to BookWalker Co., Ltd. In September 2013, the store was expanded to feature manga as well as light novels.

BookWalker Global was launched in English in November 2014, featuring manga from Viz Media and Dark Horse Comics. However, due to the lack of titles it was closed temporarily, before reopening in October 2015. In November 2015, the global store added thirty-five titles from Shōnen Gahōsha. In July 2015, the global store started offering titles from Yen Press. In December 2016, the Japanese store launched a magazine subscription service, called Magazine☆Walker. In March 2019, the global store started offering titles from Kodansha USA. In April 2019, the global store started offering titles from Tokyopop. In May 2019, the global store started offering titles from Sol Press.

The company also operated Kadokawa's talent agency division GeeXPlus as a subsidiary from its founding in July 2019 until it became part of Dwango in February 2025.

In December 2019, the Japanese store launched a subscription service that offers some of the books published by the parent company for a fee. On April 2, 2020, Magazine☆Walker ended service and was replaced with a new service called Book☆Walker Manga/Magazine Unlimited Reading.

In February 2025, Kadokawa announced that BookWalker and Kadokawa Connected would be merged into Dwango, effective as of April 1, 2025. This merger did not affect the activities of the merged companies, such as BookWalker, which retains with its brand and operations, but managed by Dwango.

== Publishing ==
BookWalker has published a few titles internationally on their own for sale on their store, which include the following:

- The 31st Consort (manga)
- A Boy Raised By Gods Will Be The Strongest (manga)
- The Combat Baker and His Automaton Waitress (light novel)
- Ga-Rei (manga)
- Higehiro (light novel)
- I'm Quitting Heroing (light novel, manga)
- The Insipid Prince's Furtive Grab for The Throne (light novel, manga)
- The Lotus Eaters, Drunk and Sober (manga)
- Magic Stone Gourmet: Eating Magical Power Made Me The Strongest! (manga)
- Magical Warfare (manga)
- My Little Sister Stole My Fiancé: The Strongest Dragon Favors Me And Plans To Take Over The Kingdom? (manga)
- New Normal (manga)
- Riddle Story of Devil (manga)
- The Ryuo's Work Is Never Done! (light novel)
- Sentenced to Be a Hero (manga)
- Tokyo Ravens (manga)
- Why Does Nobody Remember Me in This World? (manga)

== Subsidiaries ==
=== ComicWalker ===
Established in March 2014, this subsidiary and mobile application, joining an existing app, Manga Box, allows free access to browse the digital manga and webtoons made available by BookWalker, in the languages of Japanese, English and Mandarin, as well as its own exclusive content.

=== Trista ===
Established in September 2014, this subsidiary provides various services, such as Niconico manga and an app to help monitor time spent reading. It became a subsidiary of BookWalker on April 1, 2018.

== See also ==
- J-Novel Club
- Kadokawa Future Publishing
  - ASCII Media Works
  - Enterbrain
  - Fujimi Shobo
  - Kadokawa Shoten
  - Media Factory
- Yen Press
