= GeeXPlus =

Japanese content creator agency

- Native name: 株式会社GeeXPlus
- Romanized name: Kabushikigaisha GeeXPlus
- Type: Subsidiary
- Industry: Entertainment; Internet
- Founded: July 1, 2019; 7 years ago in Tokyo, Japan
- Founder: Kadokawa Corporation
- Headquarters: Gobanchō, Chiyoda, Tokyo, Japan
- Area served: Worldwide
- Key people: Naohiko Kurimoto (President); Meilyne Tran (Director); Connor Colquhoun (Director)
- Products: Content creation Video production Digital media Influencer marketing
- Parent: BookWalker (2019–2025); Dwango (2025–present)
- Divisions: GeeXProductions
- Website: www.geexplus.co.jp

GeeXPlus, Inc. (Japanese: 株式会社GeeXPlus, Hepburn: Kabushikigaisha GeeXPlus; stylized as GeeX+) is a Japanese talent agency that manages content creators targeting overseas audiences. Founded in 2019 by the Kadokawa Corporation as a part of BookWalker, the company aims to connect Japanese brands with global influencers by supporting content production, promotion, and distribution. GeeXPlus is known for bringing international creators to Japan, including members of the Trash Taste podcast. In 2025, GeeXPlus became part of Dwango and launched GeeXProductions, a new division focused on producing creator-led projects such as anime, web series, and digital media. Notable content creators that are affiliated with GeeXPlus include Gigguk, CDawgVA, Emirichu, Daidus, DillonGoo, and CaptainSparklez among others.

== History ==
=== 2017–2019: The origin ===
The origins of GeeXPlus can be traced back to c. 2017, when Kadokawa's subsidiary BookWalker, which would later operate GeeXPlus as a subsidiary two years later, began sponsoring video reviews of its manga and light novels, through various anime content creators. They would later start a partnership with Garnt Maneetapho (known as Gigguk) that same year, who would later join GeeXPlus after it was founded in 2019.

=== 2019–2022: Foundation and early years ===
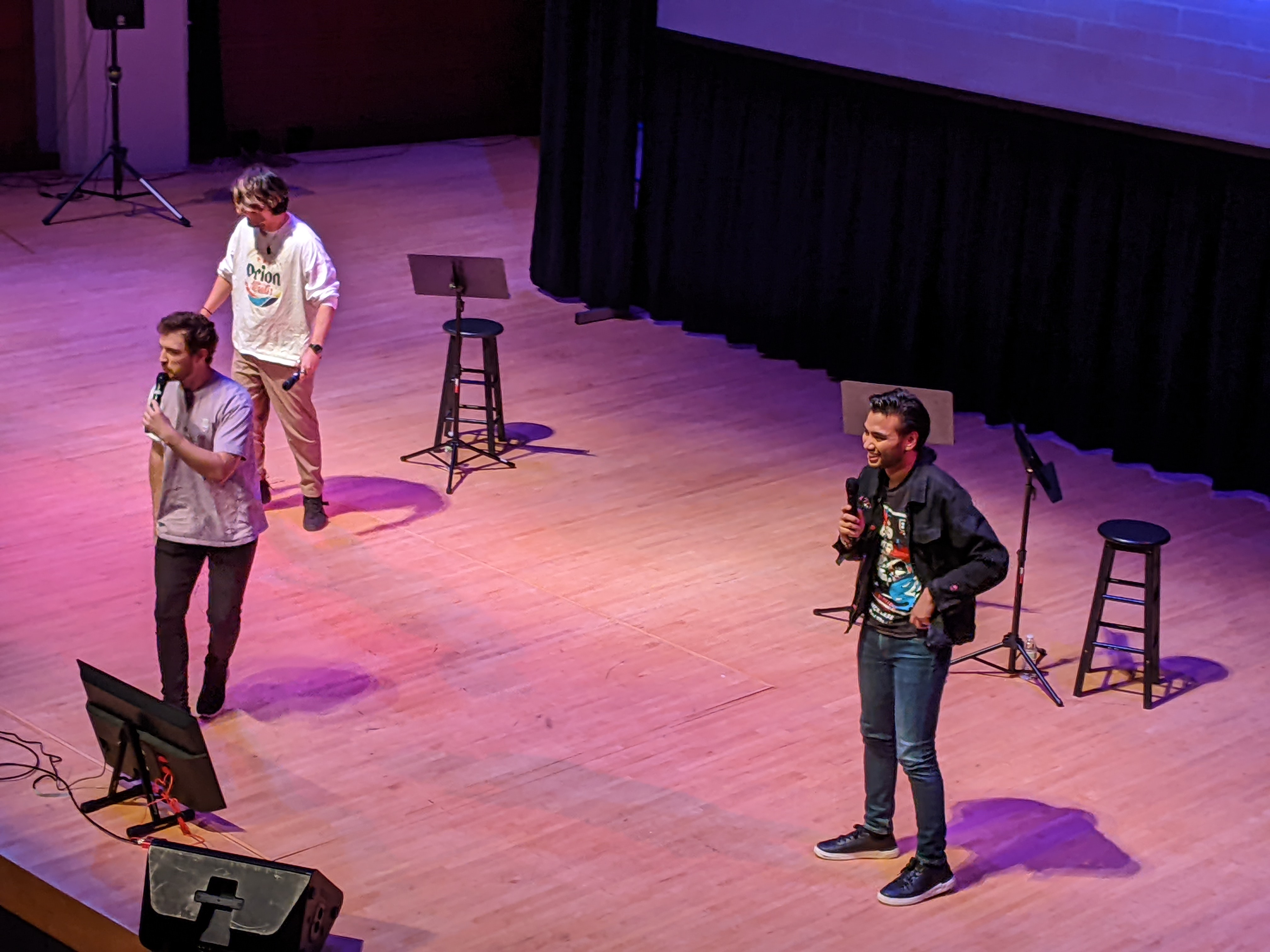
The Anime Man, CDawgVA, and Gigguk during a Trash Taste live show in 2022.

GeeXPlus was established on July 1, 2019, as a talent agency division of Japanese conglomerate Kadokawa Corporation. Its goal was to connect Japanese brands with global influencers by helping with promotion planning, production, and distribution. The idea for GeeXPlus partly came from American director Meilyne Tran, who later became its chief operating officer, after the Japanese government announced plans to offer more working visas to non-Japanese people involved in promoting and producing Japanese content.

In October 2019, GeeXPlus invited three anime YouTubers Garnt Maneetapho, Connor Colquhoun (CDawgVA), and Sydney Poniewaz (Sydsnap) to move to Japan and create content there. They joined other anime creators already living in Japan, which included Joey Bizinger (also known as The Anime Man) and Foxen Anime, among others. In February 2020, Bizinger, Colquhoun, and Maneetapho started the podcast Trash Taste not long after Colquhoun and Maneetapho moved to Japan.

=== 2022–2025: Expansion ===
In 2022, they signed gaming YouTuber TheGamingBeaver and helped him relocate to Japan, followed by artists Emily Sim (Emirichu) and Daidus later in September, helping them move to Japan after contacting Sim through Colquhoun. Emirichu and Daidus would later create their shared YouTube channel Spilled Ink in August 2023, and they helped find sponsors a year later. Around the same time, the company signed Onigiri, a Vtuber and cook, and helped her move to Japan. In October 2023, GeeXPlus launched a global creator application program to find and support international talents, with the application process being made available through Google Forms.

In October 2024, GeeXPlus announced that it had signed TikTok creator Kristine Fel (Kfel), marking the first time the company had partnered with a short-form content creator. Later in the month, it was also announced that Connor Colquhoun (CDawgVA) would join the company's board to help oversee production and guide its growth strategy.

=== 2025–present: Launch of GeeXProduction ===
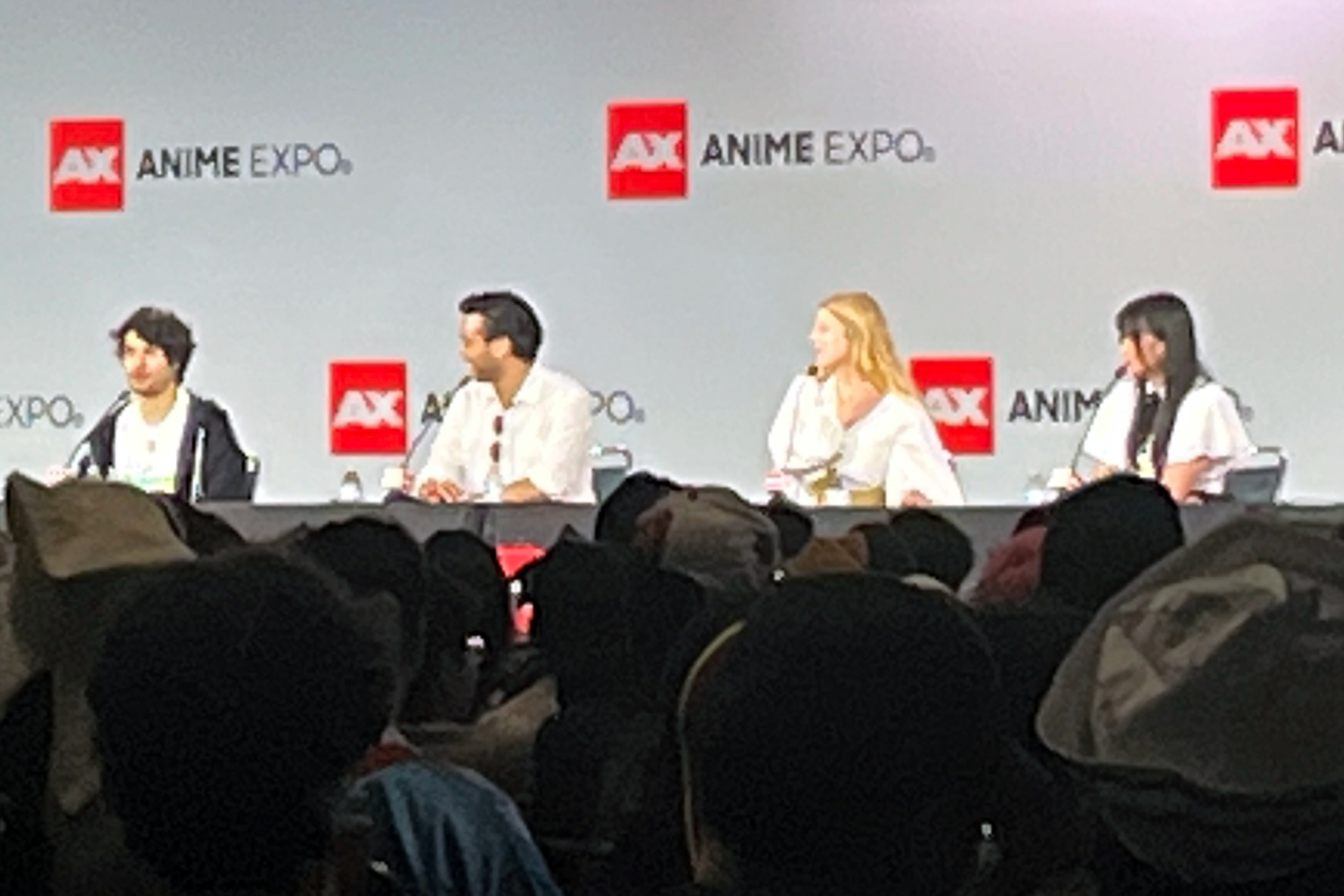
The GeeXPlus panel during Anime Expo 2025.

In February 2025, GeeXPlus was moved from under BookWalker to become part of Dwango after Kadokawa decided to merge BookWalker and Kadokawa Connected into Dwango, in response to the increasingly competitive market. In June 2025, they signed Megan and Ben (also known as HitoBito), two are former English teachers from the JET Programme who became famous on TikTok. That same month, GeeXPlus was announced to have a panel at Anime Expo 2025.

On July 3, 2025, at Anime Expo, GeeXPlus announced the creation of a new division called GeeXProduction to help support and produce projects made by creators who work with GeeXPlus. Following the announcement, Gigguk, DillonGoo, and OtakuVS announced their works: the anime short film Bâan: The Boundary of Adulthood, a 3D animated web series and webtoon Soul Mart, and an independent animated web series Otachan! Rabbit Season, respectively. In an interview with the Japanese entertainment website Natalie, GeeXProduction executive producer Rick Gao said that the new division was created to allow deeper involvement in creative projects, from the early planning stages all the way to completion.

== Talents ==
As of 2026, talents that are currently affiliated with GeeXPlus include:

- The Anime Man
- Gigguk
- CDawgVA
- Sydsnap
- Foxen Anime
- Emirichu
- Daidus
- Ohara
- TheGamingBeaver
- Onigiri
- Minori
- Saiiren
- Mother's Basement
- DotoDoya
- Kfel
- Seerasan
- DillonGoo
- Goresh
- Megan and Ben (HitoBito)
- Let me solo her
- Iron Pineapple
- Suburbanwill
- Dangoheart Animation
- OtakuVS
- DeputyAruuu
- Arielle
- Snifferish
- Kojimochi
- Max D. Capo
- Alvin Zhou
- CaptainSparklez
- Kara Corvus
- Hime Hajime (Note: Former VShojo affiliate.)
- Lucius Merryweather (Note: Also an AstraLine affiliate.)
- FroggyLoch
- PapaMutt
- Peter (Note: Also known as PremierTwo.)
- Yazy (Note: Also known as Best Girl's Basement. Previously a GeeXPlus partner before becoming a full member.)
