= SMASH! (convention) =

Anime convention in Australia

SMASH! Sydney Manga and Anime Show
- Status: Active
- Genre: Anime, Japanese pop culture
- Venue: International Convention Centre Sydney
- Location: Sydney, New South Wales
- Country: Australia
- Inaugurated: 2007
- Attendance: 53,071 in 2026
- Organiser: SMASH Inc.
- Filing status: Non-profit
- Website: https://smash.org.au/

SMASH! Sydney Manga and Anime Show (typically abbreviated to SMASH!) is an annual Japanese pop culture convention held during July/August at the International Convention Centre Sydney in Sydney, New South Wales, and is the largest anime convention in Australia.

== Programming ==
The convention typically offers an artist circle, art competitions, community groups, cosplay competition and games, karaoke competition, maid cafe, merchandise vendors, panels, stage events, trivia, video game tournaments, and workshops. It also hosts the Gunpla Builders World Cup and World Cosplay Summit preliminary. On some years, a concert or after hours event also takes place that feature musical guests.

== Organization ==
SMASH! is run by SMASH Inc, a non-profit association incorporated in New South Wales that began in 2007. SMASH Inc is controlled by a board elected each year by the members of the association. The board in turn selects a management team responsible for the planning and day-to-day conduct of the convention as well as a staff of volunteers organised into various departments. The board, management and staff total more than 200 people.

=== Mascots ===
The convention features two mascots, a boy, Cyrus, and a girl, Skadi. The pair are twin prince and princesses of the planet "Sumashcomianganimelis" (or "Smash" for short) in the "Ota Kuu" galaxy, who have been sent on a mission by the King of the Cosmos to spread Ota Kuu culture to Earth. The mascots were designed in 2007 by Sai Nitivoranant and have been drawn by numerous artists, including guests of the convention, Tan Kit Mun, Alexandra Szweryn and Shaun Healey. In 2025 as part of the 'Fantasy Camping' theme, a giant red frog who wears bear ears and a birthday party hat named 'Scrampton' was added to help Cyrus and Skadi on their adventures. In 2026 for the 2026 'Expedition in the Lost World: Hollow Mountain Adventure' theme, SMASH introduced a new cuddly mascot called 'Pipkin'. This creature was a pink baby trex that still wore part of its egg as a diaper.

== History ==
SMASH! was conceived by Katie Huang, an artist and illustrator living and working in Sydney. The event was originally called ComicWorld Sydney and was more closely modelled on the Comic World events held in Singapore, Hong Kong and Taiwan. As the number of people involved in organising the event increased, the focus broadened and the name was changed to SMASH! Sydney Manga and Anime Show.

In the first year, the convention setup the first maid cafe and host club to be at an anime convention in Australia. It was also where The Melancholy of Haruhi Suzumiya and Death Note made their Australian premiere. In 2010, SMASH! hosted the first national final of the Bandai Action Kit Universal Cup held in Australia in conjunction with Hobbyco and Namco Bandai; it was also the first year the convention reached its attendance cap. In 2014, SMASH! began its association with the World Cosplay Summit, holding the Australian Preliminary Final. That same year it also staged the NIPPON World Karaoke Grand Prix Australian Preliminary Final.

In 2020 and 2021, the convention was first postponed, then cancelled due to the Australian Government advice regarding the organisation of public gatherings during the COVID-19 pandemic.

In 2025, the convention was held for 3 days with an early opening on Friday evening, dubbed the 'Camp Out for Charity', in line with that year's theme of 'Fantasy Camping'. Tickets were purchased separately, or as an add-on to a normal weekend ticket. All proceeds from the sales of Friday tickets were equally donated to Minus18, headspace Bankstown, Youth Off The Streets, Mission Australia, Cure Cancer, and the Bobby Goldsmith Foundation. For the first time, the convention was held twice in the same year, with a smaller convention in November titled 'SMASH! Chibi'.

=== Event History ===
Dates	Location	Atten.	Guests
18 August 2007	The Roundhouse, University of New South Wales; Sydney, New South Wales	1,435	Queenie Chan, W Chew Chan, Gregor Whiley, and Yunyu.
2 August 2008	The Roundhouse, University of New South Wales; Sydney, New South Wales	2,295	Queenie Chan, W Chew Chan, Hidenobu Kiuchi, and Tan Kit Mun.
8–9 August 2009	The Roundhouse, University of New South Wales; Sydney, New South Wales	2,709	Cuson Lo, Alexandra Szweryn and Roger Lock.
7 August 2010	Sydney Town Hall; Sydney, New South Wales	2,810	Yūko Miyamura, Tiffany Grant, Matt Greenfield, Shaun Healey, and Mikiko Ponczcek.
16 July 2011	Sydney Convention and Exhibition Centre; Sydney, New South Wales	5,405	Bea Billany, Hiroki Kikuta, Shinichi Watanabe, Kenji Ito, and Mari Yoshida. Concert, featuring Eminence.
14 July 2012	Sydney Convention and Exhibition Centre; Sydney, New South Wales	6,200	Shin-ichiro Miki, Yūko Miyamura, and Sakura Tange.
10 August 2013	Sydney Convention and Exhibition Centre; Sydney, New South Wales	7,849	Hidenori Matsubara, Haruko Momoi, Masakazu Morita, and Loverin Tamburin. Concert, featuring Vocaloid, Kz (Livetune), and Hachioji-P.
9–10 August 2014	Rosehill Gardens Racecourse; Rosehill, New South Wales	13,617	Kotono Mitsuishi, Toshihiro Kawamoto, and Reika.
8–9 August 2015	Rosehill Gardens Racecourse; Rosehill, New South Wales	14,000+	Danny Choo, Hiroaki Yura, Noriaki Sugiyama, Reika, and Loverin Tamburin. I Love Anisong (concert), featuring GARNiDELiA, Kz (Livetune), Nagi Yanagi, and DJ Hello Kitty.
20–21 August 2016	Rosehill Gardens Racecourse; Rosehill, New South Wales	–	Hideo Ishikawa, Ai Nonaka, Takahiro Sakai, and Yuegene Fay. After Hours, featuring Cataclystic, Hachioji-P, and IA.
19–20 August 2017	Rosehill Gardens Racecourse; Rosehill, New South Wales	–	Daisuke Sakaguchi, Shizuka Ito, Baozi & hana, Redjuice, Shiori Mikami, Yusuke Kozaki, and Asami Hagiwara. After Hours featuring TeddyLoid, Jadebella, Kenaz and DJ Yui Kanan.
14–15 July 2018	International Convention Centre Sydney; Sydney, New South Wales	22,000+	Yoko Taro, Tsubasa Yonaga, Takahiro Omori, Ryotaro Okiayu, Mon, and Spike Spencer.
13–14 July 2019	International Convention Centre Sydney; Sydney, New South Wales	22,000+	Rie Kugimiya, Atsushi Abe, Fumiko Orikasa, Kousuke Toriumi, Kizuna Ai, Goichi Suda, Seiji Mizushima, Junichiro Tamura, The Anime Man, Dear Kiss, Swallowtail Butler Opera, King, HaneAme, Chihiro, Baozi & Hana, Ayasa, DJ Hosaka☆, Gear (GinyuforcE), and Latte (GinyuforcE). I Love Anisong (concert), featuring Kz (livetune), Konomi Suzuki, Chihara Minori and Nano.
16–17 July 2022	International Convention Centre Sydney; Sydney, New South Wales	28,000+	The Anime Man, Hakos Baelz, CDawgVA, Gigguk, Hikarin, Kevin Penkin, Tsukumo Sana, Yosuke Sora, and Sydsnap.
1–2 July 2023	International Convention Centre Sydney; Sydney, New South Wales	30,000+	SungWon Cho, Kureiji Ollie, Pavolia Reine, Toru Furuya, LAM, Rithe, Luto Araka, Lana Shikami, Sara Nagare, Nana Asteria, and Ladybeard.
20–21 July 2024	International Convention Centre Sydney; Sydney, New South Wales	36,000+	Kimitoshi Yamane, Yū Hayashi, Kore Yamazaki, Shu Uchida, Fuwawa and Mococo Abyssgard (FuwaMoco), Alexander Smith (noriyaro), DJ Haru, Gale, Kiyo, and Swallowtail.
11–13 July 2025	International Convention Centre Sydney; Sydney, New South Wales	47,500	Aimi, Masaya Fukunishi, Kenji Nojima, Kz, NORISTRY, Arcana Project, Babybeard, Erica Mendez, Lucien Dodge, Akai Haato, Kobo Kanaeru, Virtulantes, Hokuyuu, Namie, Nana Asteria, Thames Malerose, VyeCos, Scrap, Raina Illune, Vedra, at-home cafe, and Swallowtail.
22–23 November 2025 (SMASH! Chibi)	Rosehill Gardens Racecourse; Rosehill, New South Wales	-	-
12–13 July 2026	International Convention Centre Sydney; Sydney, New South Wales	53,071	Mackenyu, TeddyLoid, Yūka Nishio, Rikako Aida, Densetsu.EXE, AriesFaries, Toshiaki Takayama, AiSA, Kradness, Yoshida Yasei, AKrCos, Inspector Lemon, Astercat Cosplay, Giorgia Costumes, at-home cafe, and Swallowtail.
