= The Art of Murder (web series) =

Australian independent animated web series

- Genre: Musical; Mystery
- Created by: Nirali Somala; Anokhi Somala
- Written by: Nirali Somala; Anokhi Somala
- Directed by: Nirali Somala
- Voices of: Joey Richter; Lauren Lopez; Megan Lee; Joey Bizinger
- Country of origin: Australia
- Original language: English
- No. of episodes: 1

Production
- Executive producers: Nirali Somala; Anokhi Somala
- Producer: Anokhi Somala
- Editor: Nirali Somala
- Running time: 20 minutes
- Production company: Choc Chip Animation Studios

Original release
- Network: YouTube
- Release: 14 November 2024

The Art of Murder is an Australian independent animated web series created by Nirali and Anokhi Somala and produced by Choc Chip Animation Studios.

== Episodes ==
No.	Title	Original release date
1	"Pilot"	14 November 2024
