= New Normal (manga) =

Japanese manga series

- Cover of the first volume

ニューノーマル (Nyū Nōmaru)
- Genre: Romantic comedy
- Manga
- Written by: Akito Aihara
- Published by: Funguild
- English publisher: BookWalker
- Imprint: Comic Owl
- Magazine: Access Books; Comic CMoa; Renta!
- Original run: December 4, 2020 – present
- Volumes: 9
- icon

New Normal (Japanese: ニューノーマル, Hepburn: Nyū Nōmaru) is a Japanese manga series written and illustrated by Akito Aihara. Published by Funguild, it began serialization on various webcomic platforms in December 2020. As of June 2026, the series' individual chapters have been collected into nine print volumes.

== Plot ==
In New Normal, wearing a mask is commonplace and showing your mouth to someone of the opposite sex can be seen as an admission of love. After Natsuki's classmate, Hata, sees her without her mask on, the two begin a secret relationship where they show each other their faces in private.

== Publication ==
Written and illustrated by Akito Aihara, the series is published by Funguild under their Comic Owl imprint. It began serialization on various webcomic platforms, including Access Books, Comic CMoa, and Renta!, on December 4, 2020. As of June 2026, the series' individual chapters have been collected into nine tankōbon volumes.

BookWalker is publishing the series in English digitally.

=== Volumes ===
No.	Japanese release date	Japanese ISBN
1	July 19, 2021	978-4-91-061700-8
2	November 17, 2021	978-4-91-061701-5
3	July 19, 2022	978-4-91-061704-6
4	March 17, 2023	978-4-91-061708-4
5	February 19, 2024	978-4-91-061721-3
6	June 17, 2024	978-4-91-061726-8
7	December 17, 2024	978-4-91-061730-5
8	October 17, 2025	978-4-91-061748-0
9	June 17, 2026	978-4-91-061774-9

== Reception ==
A columnist for ITmedia liked the portrayal of adolescent romance, describing it as "realistic". They also liked the story's darker elements.
