= I Love Anisong =

Anime-themed concert series

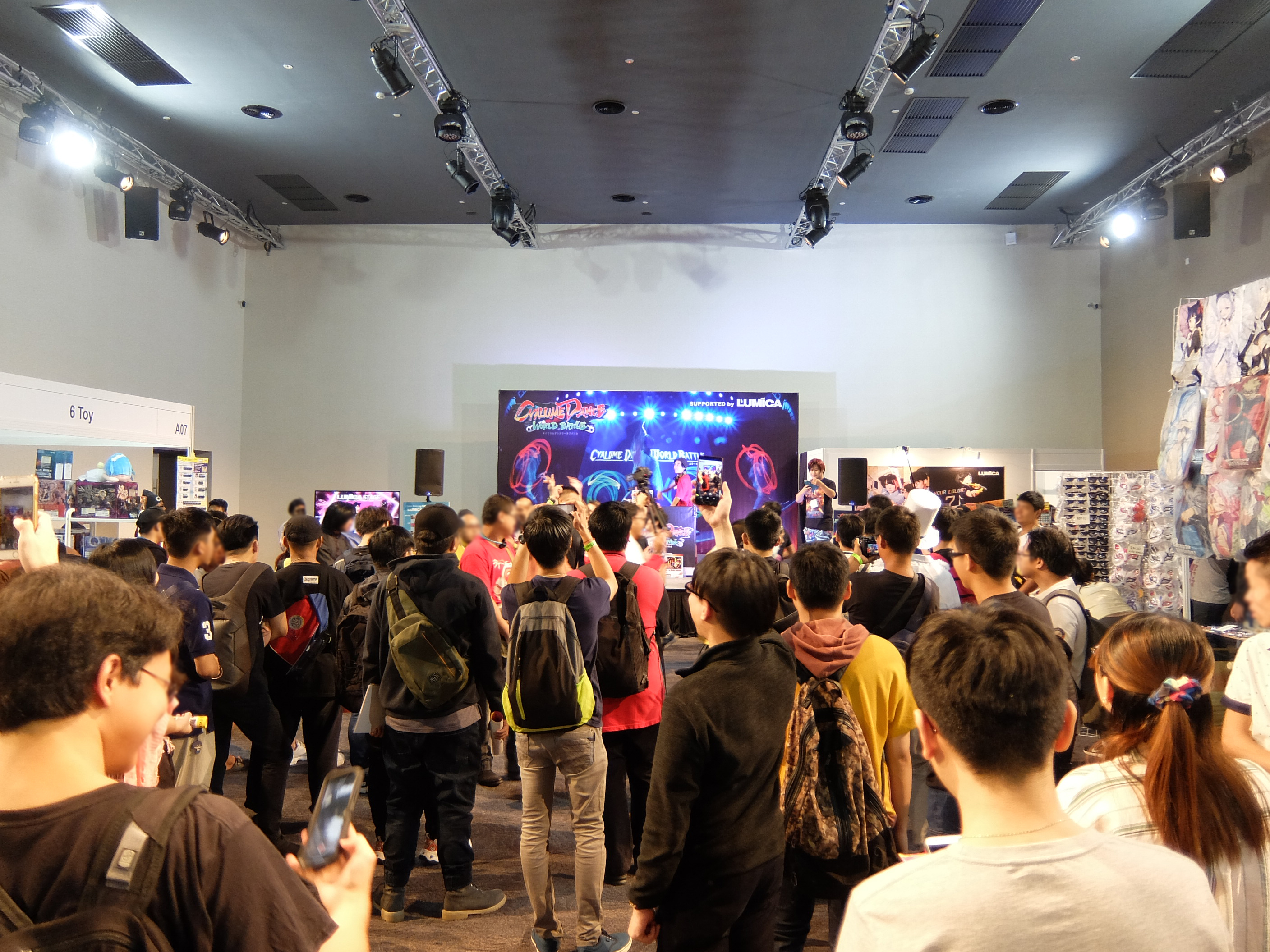
- I Love Anisong Matsuri Malaysia 2019
- Status: Active
- Locations: Singapore (main convention)(2008–present); Malaysia (2012); Indonesia (2012–2018); Thailand (2015–2017); Hong Kong (2018–present)
- Inaugurated: 2008
- Attendance: Approximately 25,000 (2008-present)
- Website: www.animefestival.asia

I Love Anisong (ILA) is the flagship concert of the Anime Festival Asia brand of events since 2008. It is being held in South East Asia and Hong Kong along with AFA, and as well as in Australia in collaboration with SMASH and the Philippines in collaboration with Cosplay Mania.

== Event history ==
Date	Theme If applicable	Participating artiste	Venue	Ref.
Saturday 22 November 2008 Sunday 23 November 2008		Ichirou Mizuki May'n	Suntec Convention & Exhibition Centre, Singapore	
Saturday 21 November 2009 Sunday 22 November 2009	I LOVE ANISONG	Hatsune Miku Ichirou Mizuki May'n Shoko Nakagawa Yoshiki Fukuyama	Suntec Convention & Exhibition Centre, Singapore	
Saturday 13 November 2010 Sunday 14 November 2010	Mega Music Concert	Angela Ichirou Mizuki JAM Project May'n SCANDAL	Suntec Convention & Exhibition Centre, Singapore	
Friday 11 November 2011 Saturday 12 November 2011 Sunday 13 November 2011	Rock Your Soul	Hatsune Miku Ichirou Mizuki Flow LiSA Sea☆A May'n Angela Kalafina Kanako Itō Milky Holmes	Suntec Convention & Exhibition Centre, Singapore	
Friday 9 November 2012 Saturday 10 November 2012 Sunday 11 November 2012	ELECTRIC GROOVE - ANISONG WORLD STAGE	T.M. Revolution Babymetal Flow fripSide LiSA m.o.v.e Hachioji-P May'n Minami Kuribayashi Sea*A Sphere	Singapore Expo, The MAX Pavilion. Singapore	
Friday 8 November 2013 Saturday 9 November 2013 Sunday 10 November 2013	VALVARAVE Night (10 Nov)	Egoist Hachioji-P Livetune motsu x DJ KAYA Valerie Eir Aoi LiSA May'n Milky Holmes angela T.M.Revolution ELISA T.M.Revolution X Nana Mizuki	Suntec Convention & Exhibition Centre, Singapore	
Friday 5 December 2014 Saturday 6 December 2014 Sunday 17 December 2014		angela Eir Aoi Eri Kitamura Flow fripSide GARNiDELiA The IDOLM@STER DJ Kazu LiSA May'n ROOT FIVE yanaginagi Yui Horie	Suntec Convention & Exhibition Centre, Singapore	
Friday 27 November 2015 Saturday 28 November 2015 Sunday 29 November 2015	P's LIVE(28 Nov)	Aimer Ayana Taketatsu BACK-ON bless4 GARNiDELiA HoneyWorks / CHiCO with HoneyWorks Lia Maaya Uchida May'n MICHI Mika Kobayashi feat. Tetsuro Shimaguchi nano Shiori Mikami Suzuko Mimori Yumiri Hanamori Yurika Endo ZAQ	Suntec Convention & Exhibition Centre, Singapore	
Friday 25 November 2016 Saturday 26 November 2016 Sunday 27 November 2016		HOME MADE KAZOKU Kotoko T.M.Revolution JAM Project Konomi Suzuki Minori Chihara Wake Up, Girls! Aimer Alisa Takigawa Ami Wajima HoneyWorks / CHiCO with HoneyWorks	Suntec Convention & Exhibition Centre, Singapore	
Friday 24 November 2017 Saturday 25 November 2017 Sunday 26 November 2017		Nogizaka46 FLOW Iris Shiena Nishizawa Tomohisa Sako ClariS Konomi Suzuki Moso Calibration nano TRUE fripside Luce Twinkle Wink Mashiro Ayano May'n	Suntec Convention & Exhibition Centre, Singapore	
Friday 30 November 2018 Saturday 1 December 2018 Sunday 2 December 2018		angela EARPHONES Erii Yamazaki GARNiDELiA KISIDAKYODAN AND THE AKEBOSIROCKETS Mili May'n nano Real Akiba Boyz Shiena Nishizawa SPYAIR Tielle&Gemie Suzuko Mimori TrySail YURIKA Ayasa	Suntec Convention & Exhibition Centre, Singapore	
