= Haruna Mikawa =

Japanese voice actress and singer

- 三川 華月
- Born: February 23, 1998 (age 28); Kanagawa, Japan
- Occupation: voice actress
- Years active: 2022–present
- Agent: Ken Production

Haruna Mikawa (born February 23, 1998), also known as Kazuki Mikawa, is a Japanese voice actress. She is known for the voice of Hana Suzuki in The Idolm@ster Shiny Colors and Satoko Kusagakure in A Ninja and an Assassin Under One Roof.

== Early life ==
From a young age, Mikawa wrote in her graduation essay that she wanted to be an actress and have a job where she could show something. As a middle school student, Mikawa was strict with club activities and did not have time to think about such a dream. However, when a senior told her about the anime Inu × Boku SS, she became interested in voice acting and began to research it, and decided to aim for a career in voice acting. In 2017, Mikawa was scouted by seven companies at the 11th Seiyu Awards New Talent Audition. Although she had no prior training and had been self-studying, the judges praised her for her beautiful Japanese and acting skills in her narration. After leaving School Duo, Mikawa joined Ken Production on April 1, 2020.

== Filmography ==
=== Anime ===
2020

- Assault Lily Bouquet as Tatsuki Mori

2022

- Blue Lock as Kira's Fan B
- In the Land of Leadale as Sister
- Legend of Mana: The Teardrop Crystal as Izumrud
- Motto! Majime ni Fumajime Kaiketsu Zorori as Fan B; Grandson of Elder, Model A, Nurse
- My Hero Academia as Children
- My Isekai Life as Mayusura
- Pop Team Epic as Rabbit B, Sister
- Slow Loop as Girl
- When Will Ayumu Make His Move? as Rin Kagawa

2023

- Attack on Titan Final Season as Refugee
- B-Project: Passion*Love Call as Woman
- Beyblade X as Fan
- Heavenly Delusion as Sakuya
- MF Ghost as Audience C, Beef Bowl Shop Clerk, Female A, Female Customer
- Power of Hope: PreCure Full Bloom as Student
- Ron Kamonohashi's Forbidden Deductions as Passerby
- Stella of the Theater: World Dai Star as Staff
- Undead Murder Farce as Resident

2024

- Alya Sometimes Hides Her Feelings in Russian as Chief Manager
- Blue Archive The Animation as Helmet Gang
- Blue Exorcist as Student, Beauty, Exorcist, Test Subject
- Gods' Games We Play as King Eraser
- Loner Life in Another World as Elf, Head Appraiser, Volleyball Girl B
- My Deer Friend Nokotan as Classmate Girl C
- Quality Assurance in Another World as Clerk
- Solo Leveling as Sung Jin-ah/Aoi Mizushino
- Tonbo! as Kasahara

2025

- A Ninja and an Assassin Under One Roof as Satoko Kusagakure, Roboko, Roboko Mk-II
- Bogus Skill "Fruitmaster" as Ayla Lawrence
- The Gorilla God's Go-To Girl as Entourage
- Mono as Satsuki Amamiya, Mobuko Narration

2027

- My Crush's Crush as Asahi Suzukaze
- Just Like Mona Lisa

TBA

- Millennium Family as Raine
- Promise Me the Spotlight as Mizuki Natsuno

=== Anime films ===
2022

- Drifting Home as Girls Students

2024

- The Colors Within as Female Student

2025

- Bâan: The Boundary of Adulthood as Rinrada Ratchamanee

=== Original net animations ===
- Fudanshi Shōkan as Yua
- Moonrise as Sophie
- Pokémon Evolutions as Pikachu (male)
- Pokémon: Hisuian Snow
- Romantic Killer as Schoolgirl
- Secret Level
