= AniManGaki =

Anime, comic and games event in Malaysia

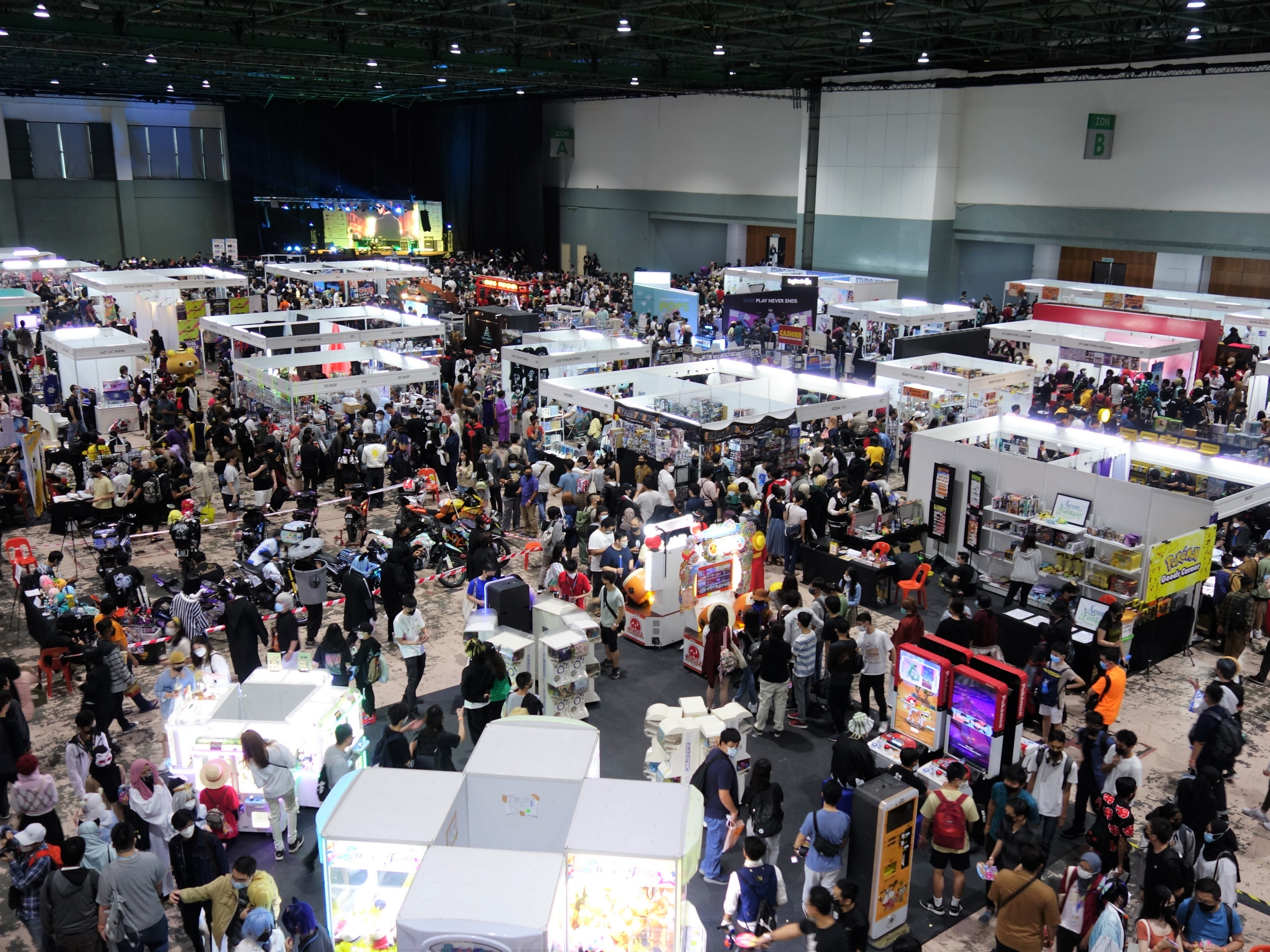
- AniManGaki 2022
- Status: Active
- Genre: Festivals
- Frequency: Annually
- Venue: Mines International Exhibition Convention Centre (MIECC)
- Locations: Seri Kembangan, Selangor
- Country: Malaysia
- Years active: 17
- Inaugurated: 27 June 2009
- Founder: Yvonne Sing
- Most recent: 28-30 August 2026
- Previous event: AniManGaki 2025
- Next event: AniManGaki 2026
- Organiser: Rakugaki Projects Sdn Bhd
- Website: animangaki.com

AniManGaki (AMG) is an annual ACG event in Malaysia.

== Name ==
AniManGaki is a portmanteau of the words Anime, Manga, Games, and Gaki. 'Gaki' in Japanese slang means 'brat'.

== History ==
AniManGaki originally started in 2009 and was founded by Yvonne Sing. It was initially organized by the Anime Club of Sunway University College. In 2011, Sunway University College had a name change to Sunway University and a year later in 2012, AniManGaki separated from the university. Currently, Animangaki is organized by the organizing committee under Rakugaki Events PLT.

#	Year	Date	Location	Attendance
1	2009	27-28 June	Sunway University College	1,000
2	2010	31 October	Sunway University College	1,600
3	2011	10-11 September	Sunway University College	2,200
4	2012	25-26 August	Sunway Pyramid Convention Centre	4,500
5	2013	24-25 August	Sunway Pyramid Convention Centre	8,000
6	2014	9-10 August	Sunway Pyramid Convention Centre	11,500
7	2015	29-30 August	Sunway Pyramid Convention Centre	13,000
8	2016	27-28 August	Sunway Pyramid Convention Centre	16,500
9	2017	19-20 August	Sunway Pyramid Convention Centre	18,500
10	2018	18-19 August	Sunway Pyramid Convention Centre	20,000
11	2019	31 August-1 September	Mines International Exhibition and Convention Centre	20,000
12	2022	27-28 August	Mines International Exhibition and Convention Centre	35,000
13	2023	25-27 August	Mines International Exhibition and Convention Centre	35,000
14	2024	23-25 August	Mines International Exhibition and Convention Centre	TBA
15	2025	22-24 August	Mines International Exhibition and Convention Centre	TBA
16	2026	28-30 August	Mines International Exhibition and Convention Centre	TBA

== Projects ==
AniManGaki consists of several parallel smaller-scale projects, such as AMG-Chan (since 2017), ACE (since 2019) and Jom Cosplay! (since 2022).
