= Dwango (company) =

Telecommunications and media company based in Japan

DWANGO Co., Ltd.
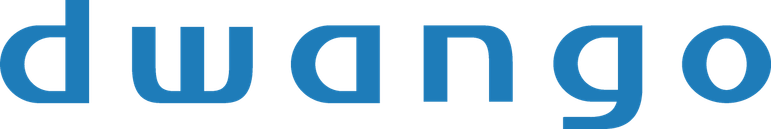

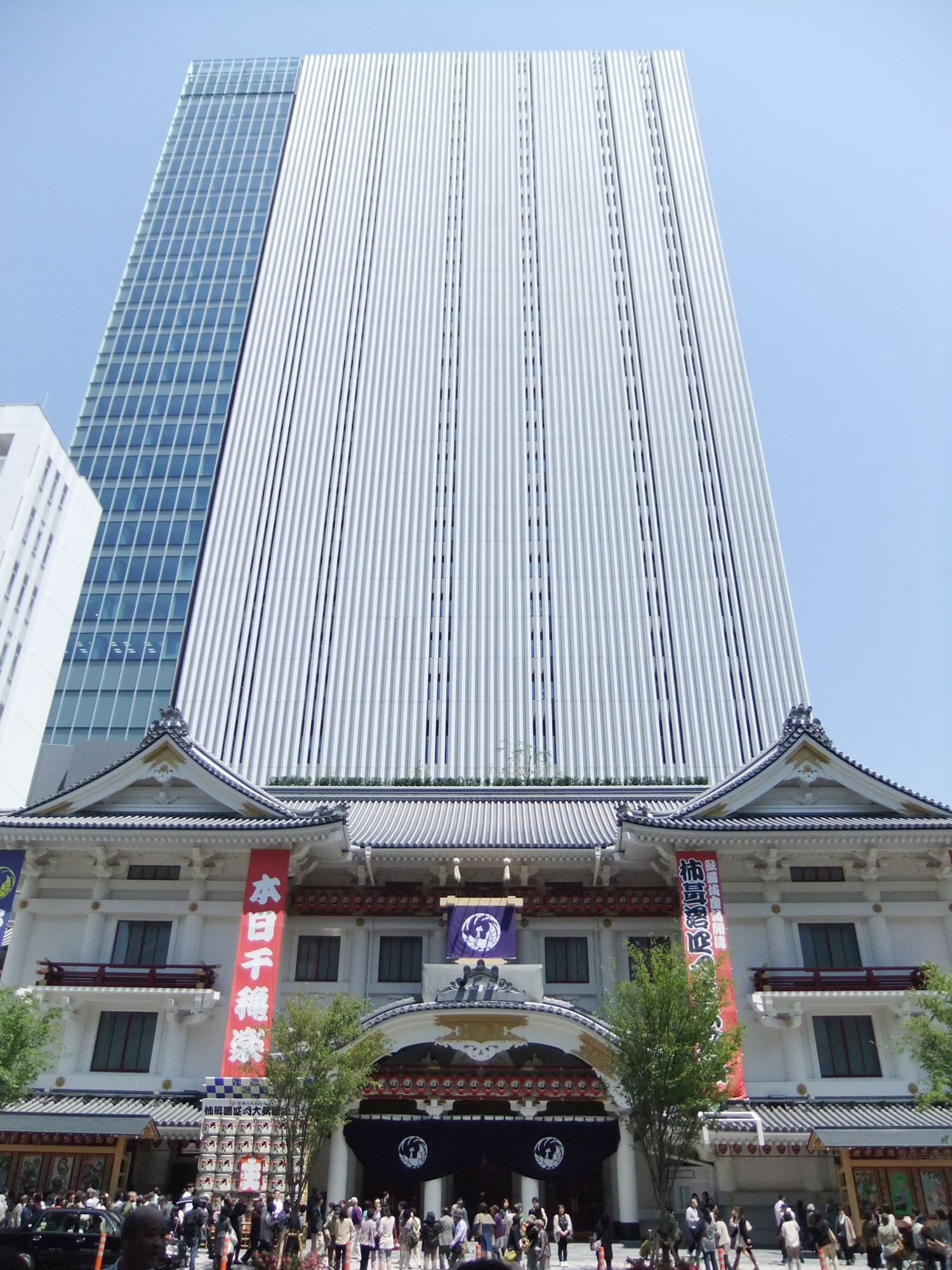
- Headquarters in Chūō, Tokyo
- Native name: 株式会社ドワンゴ
- Romanized name: Kabushiki gaisha Dowango
- Type: Subsidiary
- Industry: Entertainment; Internet
- Founded: August 6, 1997, in Tokyo, Japan
- Founder: Interactive Visual Systems d/b/a DWANGO
- Headquarters: Ginza, Chūō, Tokyo, Japan
- Key people: Takeshi Natsuno (president and CEO)
- Products: Anime; Video games Web portals Computer software
- Services: Niconico; GeeXPlus; GeeXProduction; OpenToonz
- Parent: Kadokawa Corporation
- Subsidiaries: Dehogallery; Dwango AG Entertainment; Dwango Music Publishing; FromNetworks; GeeXPlus; GeeXProduction; Project Studio Q Spike Chunsoft; Vantan; Vaka; Virtual Cast; Watanabe Amaduction
- Website: www.dwango.co.jp

DWANGO Co., Ltd. (株式会社ドワンゴ, Kabushiki gaisha Dowango) is a Japanese telecommunications and media company. The company became a wholly owned subsidiary of Kadokawa Corporation on October 1, 2014. The company was spun off from a U.S.-based service offering online multiplayer for video games, DWANGO (Dial-up Wide-Area Network Game Operation), which was shut down in 1998. Dwango's majority shareholders until its merger with Kadokawa Corporation included Kawakami himself, Kadokawa Corporation, and Avex Group. Dwango runs the popular Japanese video sharing site Niconico.

The company also is the 100% owner of the game developer Spike Chunsoft, which Dwango bought as the companies Spike and Chunsoft in 2005 when they were separated companies, before merging them in 2012. It also owns GeeXPlus, Kadokawa's influencer talent agency which promotes the company's relationship with influencers, along with its production division GeeXProduction, and also manages OpenToonz, an open source 2D animation software program.

== History ==
In November 2013, it was confirmed Nintendo purchased 612,200 or 1.5% shares of the company at the request of Nobuo Kawakami.

On May 14, 2014, it was announced that Dwango and Kadokawa Corporation would merge on October 1, 2014, and form the new holding company Kadokawa Dwango Corporation. Both Kadokawa and Dwango became subsidiaries of the new company.

In February 2019, Kadokawa Dwango announced that Dwango would stop being their subsidiary to be a direct subsidiary of Kadokawa Corporation in a reorganization of the company.

In July 2019, Mages was acquired by its CEO concept studio Chiyomaru Studio and stopped being a subsidiary of Dwango and part of the Kadokawa Group.

== Subsidiaries ==
=== GeeXPlus ===
GeeXPlus is Kadokawa's talent agency division that was founded on July 1, 2019, with the goal of "connecting Japanese brands to global influencers by providing promotion planning, production, and distribution." Its production division GeeXProduction was announced in 2025 during the Anime Expo, to produce and also promote animated content across a number of social media platforms.
