= Gigguk =

British YouTuber (born 1990)

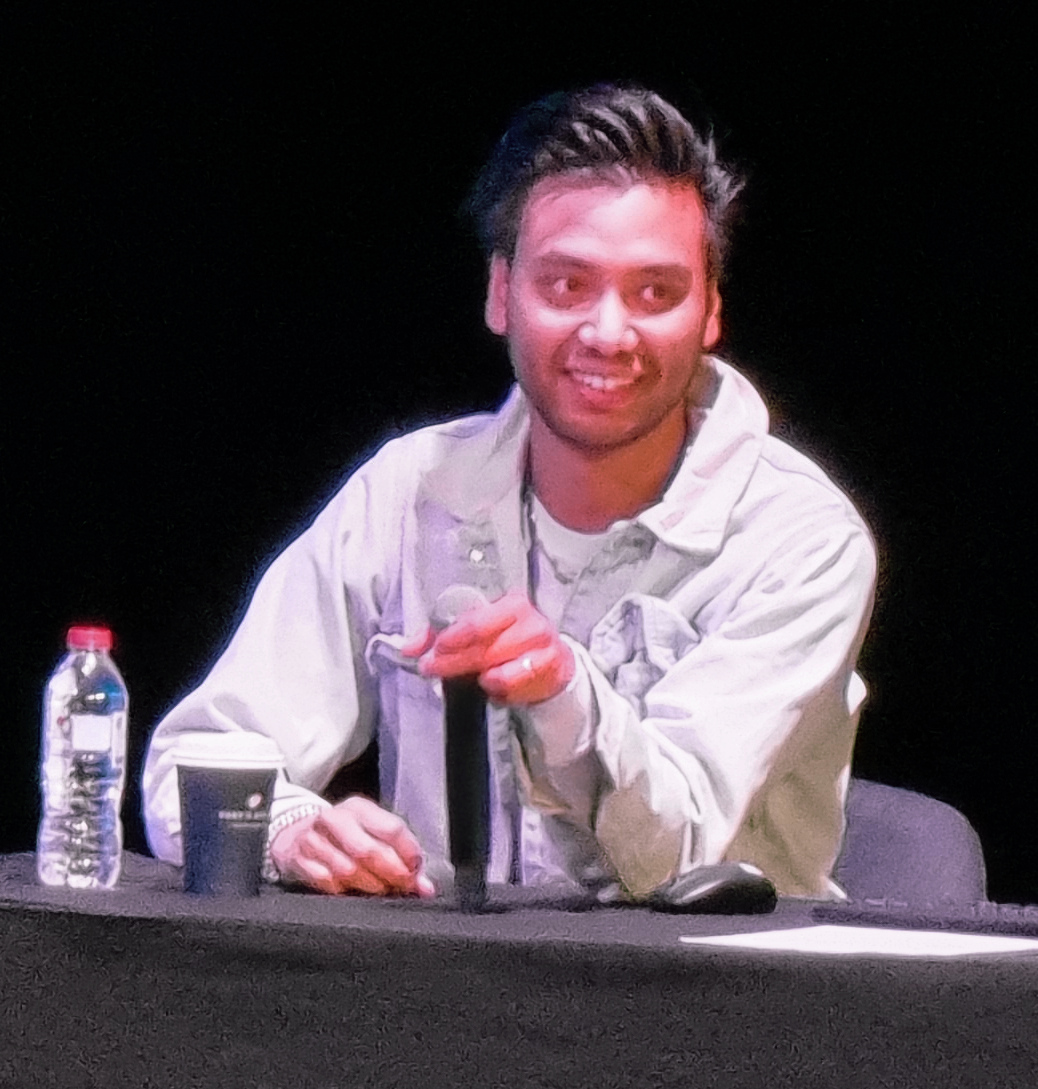
- Gigguk at SMASH! 2022 in Sydney, Australia
- Born: Garnt Maneetapho; 31 May 1990 (age 36); Brighton, East Sussex, England
- Education: University of Bristol
- Occupations: Podcaster; YouTuber
- Organisation: GeeXPlus
- Spouse: Sydney Poniewaz (m. 2022)

Twitch information
- Channel: Gigguk
- Years active: 2011–present
- Genres: Gaming; Just Chatting
- Games: Genshin Impact; Star Rail
- Followers: 435 thousand

YouTube information
- Channel: Gigguk
- Years active: 2006–present
- Genre: Anime
- Subscribers: 3.62 million
- Views: 656 million
- Last updated: 1 November 2026

Garnt Maneetapho (Note: The name Garnt is an anglicization of the Thai name กานต์ which means "dear" or "beloved" and is unrelated to the English name Grant.) (born 31 May 1990), better known as Gigguk, is a British YouTuber and podcaster who is known for his comedic rants and reviews on anime and otaku culture. He is affiliated with the Kadokawa-backed agency GeeXPlus.

== Career ==
Maneetapho created his YouTube channel, then called "The Anime Zone", in 2006, using the online pseudonym "Gigguk", a nickname by which his family called him. In 2012, he created parodies of popular anime, starting with Rebuild of Evangelion into the EvAbridged series.

From 2012 to 2016 Maneetapho was a member of the PodTaku podcast alongside co-hosts Tristan Gallant (Arkada), Holden Bremley (HoldenReviews) and Jeanne (xDisturbedJeans).

During 2017, Maneetapho retired the "Anime Zone" moniker for his channel, now just called "Gigguk". In February 2018, Maneetapho presented the Best Comedy award at the 2nd Crunchyroll Anime Awards, alongside YouTuber LilyPichu, at the Ricardo Montalbán Theatre in Los Angeles.

In November 2019, Maneetapho, along with YouTuber Sydney Poniewaz (Sydsnap), moved to northwestern Tokyo, Japan to begin working as an influencer for GeeXPlus. The effort was to help promote as well as introduce anime and Japanese culture to the rest of the world through his content.

In February 2020, Maneetapho joined alongside Connor Colquhoun (CDawgVA) and Joey Bizinger (The Anime Man) in creating and hosting a weekly audio and video podcast called Trash Taste, where they discuss anime, manga, otaku culture, and their experiences while living in Japan. The first episode was released on 5 June 2020 with new episodes available on YouTube and major podcast platforms every Friday. In August 2020, Maneetapho participated in a chess tournament hosted by Chess.com for anime YouTubers. Reaching the finals, Maneetapho beat fellow Trash Taste co-host Connor Colquhoun. In July 2021, Maneetapho successfully defended his title in Tournament Arc 2, hosted again by Chess.com.

In July 2025, Maneetapho announced on his YouTube channel about the production of an anime short film based on his original work, Bâan: The Boundary of Adulthood. The short film is produced by Studio Daisy and directed by Yoshimitsu Ohashi, with Maneetapho serving as supervising director.

In February 2026, Maneetapho announced on stream that Twitch flagged his account for breaking TOS for combining chat from third-parties. A few days later on Twitch Patch Notes, Dan Clancy, Twitch CEO, announced after feedback received from recent enforcement on Gigguk channel that they were updating Twitch guidelines to not issue enforcement actions on integrated combined chat going forward.

== Personal life ==
Maneetapho's parents are from Thailand, and he was born and raised in the United Kingdom. He is a practicing Buddhist, and has served as a monk twice in his life, once when he was a teenager and once as an adult. Maneetapho became engaged to fellow YouTuber Sydney Poniewaz on 12 April 2019. On 5 June 2022, they were married at a ceremony in the UK.

== Filmography ==
=== Anime ===
Garnt Maneetapho in anime
| Year | Title | Role | Notes | Source |
|---|---|---|---|---|
| 2024 | Mashle: Magic and Muscles | Rhodes Eamus | | |
| 2025 | Bâan: The Boundary of Adulthood | Writer and producer | | |
