= CDawgVA =

Welsh YouTuber (born 1996)

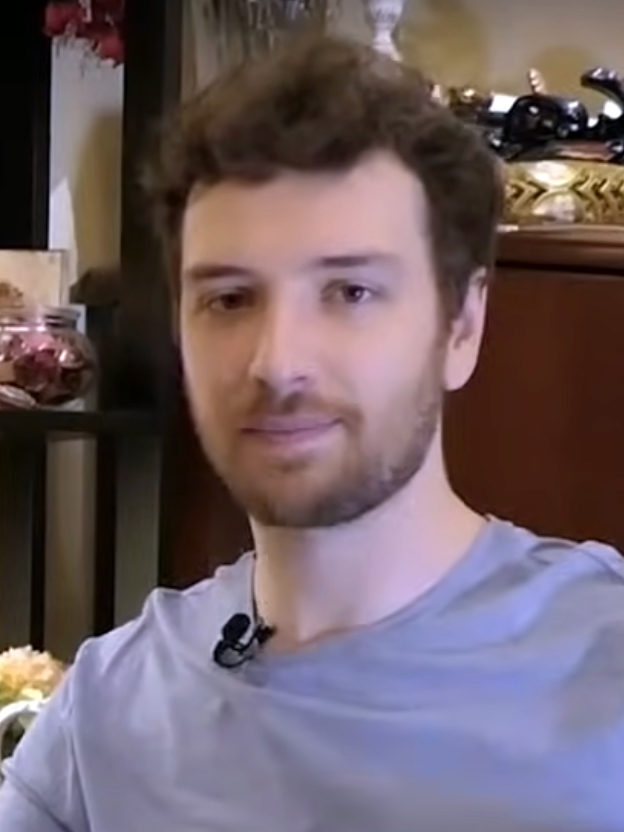
- Colquhoun in 2023
- Born: Connor Marc Colquhoun; 26 July 1996 (age 30); Wales
- Education: Swansea University
- Occupations: YouTuber; online streamer; voice actor; podcaster
- Organization: GeeXPlus

Twitch information
- Channel: CDawg
- Years active: 2013–present
- Genres: Gaming; vlog
- Games: Apex Legends; Elden Ring; Jump King; League of Legends
- Followers: 1.52 million

YouTube information
- Channel: CDawgVA
- Years active: 2014–present
- Subscribers: 3.23 million
- Views: 505 million
- Last updated: 1 November 2026

Connor Marc Colquhoun (Note: Pronounced /kəˈhuːn/ kə-HOON) (born 26 July 1996), better known as CDawg or CDawgVA, is a Welsh YouTuber, online streamer, voice actor and podcaster based in Japan. He is affiliated with the Kadokawa-backed agency GeeXPlus.

== Career ==
Colquhoun created his YouTube channel CDawgVA in February 2014. He moved to Tokyo in November 2019 to begin working as a content creator for the Kadokawa-backed agency GeeXPlus, which aimed to utilise his platform to promote anime and Japanese culture to the rest of the world.

In February 2020, Colquhoun joined The Anime Man and Gigguk in creating and hosting the weekly podcast Trash Taste, where they discuss anime, manga, otaku culture, and their experiences living in Japan. All episodes were made available on YouTube, Spotify, and iTunes.

In both 2020 and 2021, Colquhoun was a presenter at the Crunchyroll Anime Awards. In August 2020, he participated in the livestreamed chess tournament Tournament Arc, hosted by Chess.com for anime YouTubers. He lost to Gigguk in the finals. In the July 2021 sequel championship, Tournament Arc 2, he finished in fourth place.

On 11 December 2022, Colquhoun participated in a surprise "chess-slap" match with Ludwig Ahgren at the Mogul Chessboxing Championship, held at the Galen Center in Los Angeles.

On 1 March 2023, Colquhoun announced that he would be exclusively streaming on Twitch after signing an agreement. From 26 July to 18 August 2023, he participated in the PogChamps chess tournament series, securing the championship at PogChamps 5.

In October 2024, Colquhoun was announced as a board member of GeeXplus, tasked with overseeing the growth and development of new talent while providing guidance on production strategies.

In November 2026, Colquhoun was nominated for Content Creator of the Year at The Game Awards 2026, with the ceremony to be held on 10 December 2026.

== Style ==
Many of Colquhoun's videos feature him cosplaying and roleplaying, with roles ranging from hosts, butlers, pole dancers, and visual kei musicians. His YouTube channel gained popularity due to his anime content, with his favorite anime being JoJo's Bizarre Adventure.

Colquhoun is well-known for his streaming collaborations with the VTuber Ironmouse; he has described himself as being the "straight man" to Ironmouse's "chaotic" personality.

== Charity work ==
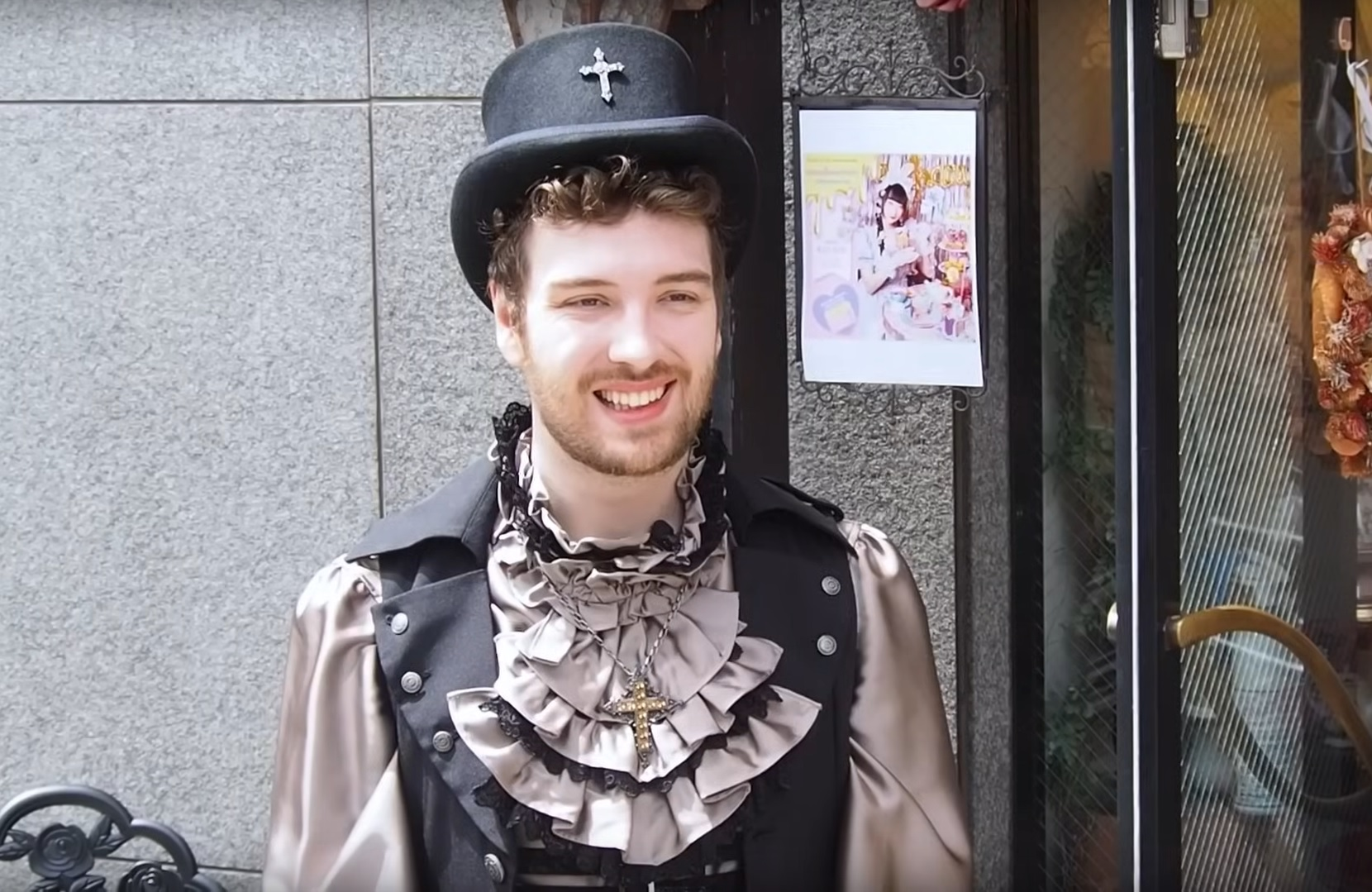
Colquhoun in gothic lolita fashion

In 2022, Colquhoun and fellow YouTuber Chris Broad of Abroad in Japan participated in an eight-day 750 km (470 mi) "cyclethon" across Hokkaido to raise funds for the Immune Deficiency Foundation. The cycle was streamed on Twitch and raised over $310,000. The event won Best Philanthropic Stream Event at the 2022 Streamer Awards.

In 2023, Colquhoun and Broad followed-up with a second cyclethon across Kyushu. The nine-day 900 km (560 mi) bike ride from Fukuoka to Kitakyushu, via the perimeter of Kyushu, raised over $555,000 for the Immune Deficiency Foundation. Later that year, Colquhoun was the auctioneer of a charity auction at the Biltmore Los Angeles. The auction featured unique items from various Twitch and YouTube streamers, raising over $329,000 for the Immune Deficiency Foundation.

In 2024, Colquhoun and Broad did a third cyclethon from Yamaguchi to Tokyo. The two-week 1,000 km (620 mi) bike ride included guest cyclists Garnt "Gigguk" Maneetapho, Felix "PewDiePie" Kjellberg, Peter "PremierTwo" Macy, and Natsuki Aso; it raised over $1 million for the Immune Deficiency Foundation. Later that year, Colquhoun organised and presented his second charity auction on Twitch, raising a total of $517,874 for the Immune Deficiency Foundation with contributions from streamers like Ludwig Ahgren, Jeremy "Jerma985" Elbertson, and Imane "Pokimane" Anys.

In 2025, Colquhoun and Broad completed a fourth cyclethon, this time from Hokkaido to Tokyo. The 15-day, 1,200 km (746 mi) bike ride again included various guests, such as Gigguk, PewDiePie, Rob "robcdee" Dee, and PremierTwo, again raising over $1 million for the Immune Deficiency Foundation.

In 2026, Colquhoun and Broad completed a fifth cyclethon over 15 days. Guests included Gigguk, robcdee, PewDiePie, and PremierTwo. The effort raised almost $1.5 million for the Immune Deficiency Foundation.

== Filmography ==
=== Anime ===
Connor Colquhoun in anime
Year	Title	Role	Notes	Ref.
2021–present	Seirei Gensouki: Spirit Chronicles	Reiss Vulfe		
2022	Tribe Nine	Monkey	1 episode	

=== Video games ===
Connor Colquhoun in video games
Year	Title	Role	Notes	Ref.
2015	Age of Empires II: Definitive Edition	African Soldier	Special thanks	
2020	Popup Dungeon	Kraken Up, Mercenary, Rumor, Brevik, Zinfandel		
2021	Earth Defense Force: World Brothers	The Royal Guard		
2021	TOME: Terrain of Magical Expertise	Asterologist		
2022	Gunvolt Chronicles: Luminous Avenger iX 2	Dacite		
2023	Omega Strikers	Rasmus		
2023	Honkai: Star Rail	Peak		
2024	Card-En-Ciel	Theodore Hohenheim, Leo, Dacite		
2024	Get To Work	Narrator		
2025	Dead Take	Carlile		
2025	BAPBAP	Froggy		
2025	Bonnie Bear Saves Frogtime	Narrator		

=== Other ===
Connor Colquhoun in other voiced works
Year	Title	Role	Notes	Ref.
2012	Dragon Ball Z Abridged	Gashew, Spice		
2015	Hunter x Hunter Abridged	Satotz		
2015	Hyrule Warriors: The Movie	Volga		
2016	Hellsing Ultimate Abridged	Headmaster/Freud		
2016	One Minute Melee	Kenpachi Zaraki, J.A.R.V.I.S.		
2016	Chronexia and the Eight Seals	Burly Guy	1 episode	
2017	Did You Know Anime?	Narrator/Himself		
2019	The Weeklings	Pie Day	1 episode	
2020	BornWild • Versus	Narrator, Lieutenant-General Gregson-Mitchell		
2021	Last of the Grads	Coast to Coast Killer (voice)	Uncredited	
2022	GODSLAP	Defister		
2023	Aeroorange	Captain H'Orange		

== Awards and nominations ==
Ceremony	Year	Category	Result	Ref.
The Game Awards	2026	Content Creator of the Year	Pending	
The Streamer Awards	2022	Best Philanthropic Stream Event (500-Mile Cyclethon)	Won	
The Streamer Awards	2022	Best Variety Streamer	Nominated	
The Streamer Awards	2023	Best Streamed Event (The CDawgVA Charity Auction)	Nominated	
The Streamer Awards	2023	Best Variety Streamer	Nominated	
The Streamer Awards	2024	Best Streamed Event (Cyclethon 3)	Nominated	
The Streamer Awards	2025	Best Stream Duo (with ironmouse)	Nominated	
