= Joey Bizinger =

Australian-Japanese YouTuber

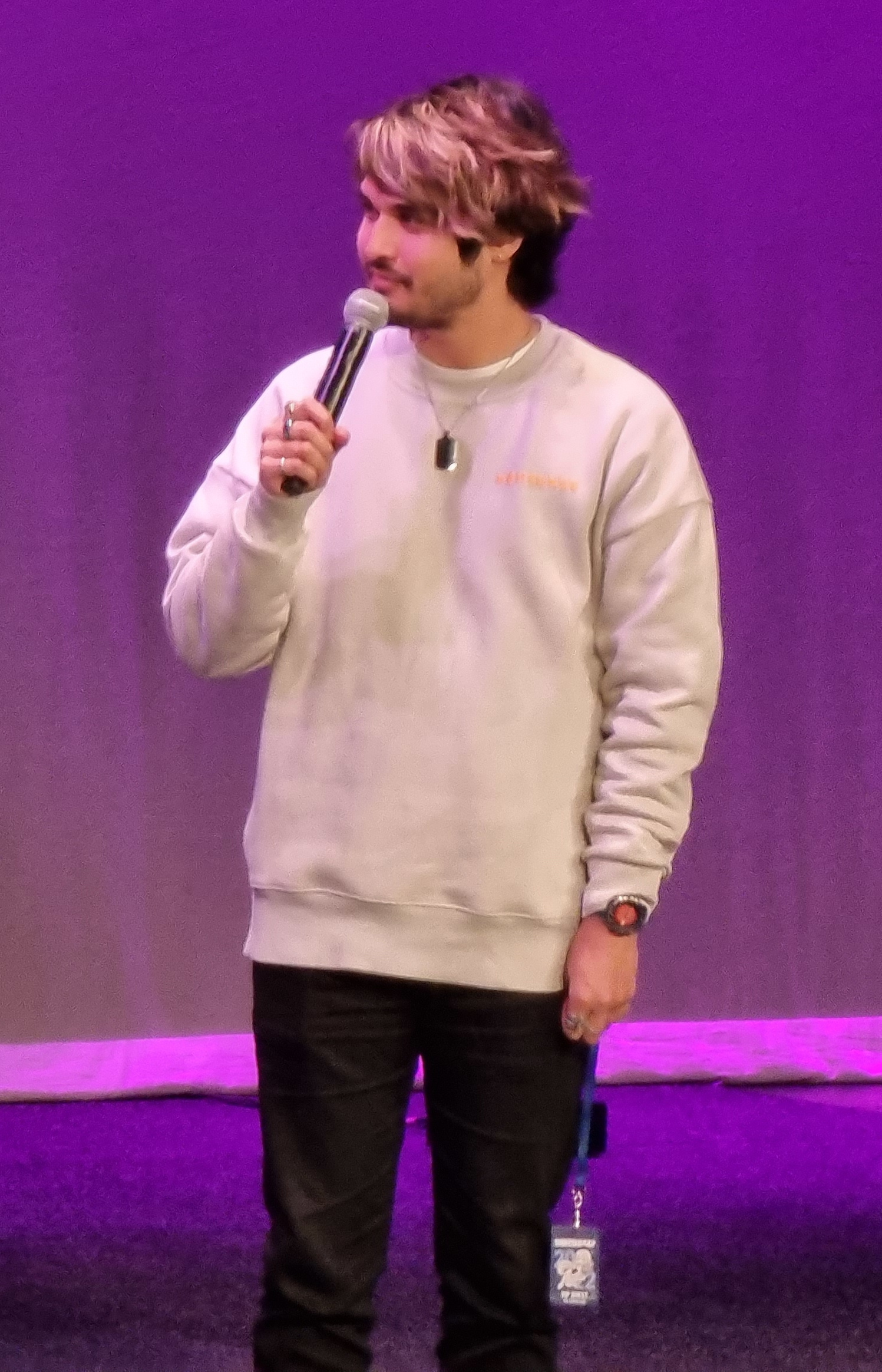
- Bizinger at SMASH! 2022 in Sydney, Australia
- Born: Joseph Tetsuro Bizinger; 28 September 1994 (age 32); Sydney, New South Wales, Australia
- Other names: Ikurru Kamijou; Ikurru
- Education: University of Sydney
- Occupations: Podcaster; songwriter; voice actor; YouTuber
- Years active: 2013–present
- Spouse: Agnes Diego (m. 2026)

Twitch information
- Channel: TheAn1meMan
- Genre: Just chatting
- Followers: 421 thousand

YouTube information
- Channel: The Anime Man
- Genres: Interview; review; vlog
- Subscribers: 3.27 million
- Views: 658 million
- Last updated: 1 November 2026
- Website: theanimeman.wordpress.com

Joseph Tetsuro Bizinger (born 28 September 1994), known online as The Anime Man, as well as his stage name Ikurru Kamijou (神城 維来, Kamijō Ikurru), is an Australian and Japanese YouTuber, voice actor, songwriter, and podcaster. His video work focuses on Japanese popular culture, which consists of anime and manga reviews, and vlogs on Japanese culture and society. Bizinger is also known for his interviews with people in the Japanese entertainment industry, such as light novel authors, manga artists, and voice actors in anime.

== Early life ==
Bizinger was born and raised in Sydney, New South Wales, on 28 September 1994. He was born into a mixed family; his mother is Japanese while his Australian father is of German and Hungarian descent. He lived in Sydney until the age of 21. Bizinger's mother wanted to ensure that he would retain his Japanese heritage by exclusively speaking in Japanese to him and showing him various Japanese anime on home video, with Doraemon, Sazae-san and Pokémon being especially prevalent in his early childhood.

Bizinger graduated from St Paul's Catholic College in Manly in 2012, having achieved Distinguished Achiever awards in his HSC results including a band 6 in Music 1, Information processes and technology, and Japanese in Context (formerly known as Heritage Japanese), in which he achieved 4th in the state. Bizinger was the only student of Japanese descent in his class, and therefore introduced a lot of his friends to anime. Growth in the popularity of anime, alongside a school project, spurred him to make a website where he reviewed Japanese animation. He kept making the reviews even after the project ended, and continued to post the reviews until graduation. While studying there, he began making YouTube videos to be posted on his website, eventually deciding to switch entirely to YouTube.

Bizinger attended the University of Sydney, where he graduated in 2016 with a degree in Computer Design Technology.

== Career ==
=== The Anime Man ===
Bizinger began his YouTube career after posting his first video, "Dubbed Anime Sucks!", on 27 May 2013. With a mixture of vlogs and discussions about various anime and manga, Bizinger would hit his first big milestone of 100,000 subscribers in 2015. This was soon followed on what is considered his break-out video, "7 Types of Anime Fans", on 17 June 2015, which ran through the various archetypes that comprise the anime community; a week after its release, Bizinger had doubled his subscriber count. In February 2016, Bizinger created his second channel, Joey, which was initially created as a 'me' channel, but has since evolved into a channel where less polished or various content that does not fit in the main channel are placed.

After graduating from university, in May 2016 Bizinger moved to Japan, where he had originally planned to work in information technology, but by then his YouTube channel had grown so successful that he could work on it full time. In January 2017, The Anime Man hit one million subscribers. From 2017 to 2018, Bizinger co-hosted a weekly SBS podcast titled, The Anime Show, with Agnes Diego (Akidearest), which ran for 68 episodes that discussed anime, manga, and otaku culture.

In 2018, Bizinger was a guest for four episodes in Abroad in Japan's Journey Across Japan series; in which he traveled on bike with British YouTuber Chris Broad, from Niigata to Itoigawa, Japan. The series documented local customs and daily life along the way, while also doing challenges to make it more interesting. In one of the challenges, Broad and Bizinger were able to make a television commercial using Morinaga in Jelly, to which Bizinger created the fictional character "Dr. Jelly." Bizinger, along with Natsuki Aso, would continue to appear in the follow-up sequels to the series: Escape to Fuji (2020) and The Lost Islands (2021). In June 2021, the single Too Much Volcano! by Abroad in Japan, featuring Bizinger and Aso, was released on the iTunes Store and Spotify; the song and accompanying music video was recorded during the production of The Lost Islands. The song peaked at 65 on the UK downloads charts on 25 June 2021.

Bizinger also began his voice acting career in 2018, with a cameo role in the video game Grisaia Phantom Trigger Vol. 4 and a narration role in an episode of Pop Team Epic. In 2020, he also got the role as Music Elitist in the video game No Straight Roads.

In February 2020, Bizinger joined alongside two other YouTubers, Thai-British Garnt Maneetapho (Gigguk) and Welsh Connor Colquhoun (CDawgVA), in creating and hosting a weekly audio and video podcast called Trash Taste, where they discuss anime, manga, otaku culture, and their experiences while living in Japan. The first episode was released on 5 June 2020 and all episodes are available on YouTube and major podcast platforms. In February 2022, Bizinger created a third channel, The Anime Man VODs, which feature recordings of his Twitch livestreams.

=== Musical career ===
Bizinger produces music under his other alias Ikurru and released an album on 18 December 2019 entitled A Picture Frame Full Of Memories, performing both piano and vocals. The album references his late grandfather Eishiro Suzuki. Bizinger has released three full-length albums as Ikurru (including a collaborative album with composer Kevin Penkin), three EPs (including a collaborative EP with musician Gray Fox, currently known as Sinewave Fox), and four standalone singles as of October 2021. Bizinger sings and raps in both English and Japanese in his music.

=== Business ventures ===
In 2022, Bizinger announced the launch of Nonsense, a streetwear clothing brand he created.

== Personal life ==
On 4 November 2016, Bizinger and fellow YouTuber Agnes Diego (Akidearest) announced that they were in a relationship. On 25 April 2025, they got engaged. On 24 October 2026, they got married.

== Discography ==
=== Studio albums ===
Title	Year
A Picture Frame Full of Memories	2019
Soundtracks for the Delicate	2021
i hope you have a nice life without me	2025

=== Extended plays ===
Title	Year
Fifteen	2020
Shirokitsune	2020
What's On Your Mind?	2022

=== Singles ===
Title	Year	Album
"I Know You Will Fall"	2020	Non-album singles
"Anime Cypher 2020" (featuring Gray Fox, Otaku>d Furiku, Rustage & Kuro!)	2020	Non-album singles
"Freefalling Upwards into an Ocean of Dreams"	2021	Non-album singles
"Twenty Seven"	2021	Non-album singles

==== Featured singles ====
Title	Year	Chart positions	Album
Title	Year	UK Down.	Album
"Kono Dio Da" (Rustage featuring The Anime Man)	2020	—	Non-album singles
"Joestar (JoJo's Bizarre Adventure)" (None Like Joshua & Musicality featuring Rustage, Nux Taku, CDawgVA, JY Shawty, Ikurru, Chi-Chi & Caleb Hyles)	2020	—	Non-album singles
"Too Much Volcano" (Abroad in Japan featuring The Anime Man & Natsuki Aso)	2021	65	Non-album singles

== Filmography ==
=== Television ===
Joseph Bizinger in television
Year	Title	Role	Notes	Source
2018	Pop Team Epic	Narrator	Voice; episode: "Dancing with a Miracle"	

=== Video games ===
Joseph Bizinger in video games
Year	Title	Role	Notes	Source
2018	Grisaia Phantom Trigger Vol.4	Himself		
2020	No Straight Roads	Music Elitist		

=== Web ===
Joseph Bizinger in television
Year	Title	Role	Notes	Source
2024	The Art of Murder	Sousuke	Voice; pilot	
