= Kadokawa Corporation =

Japanese media conglomerate

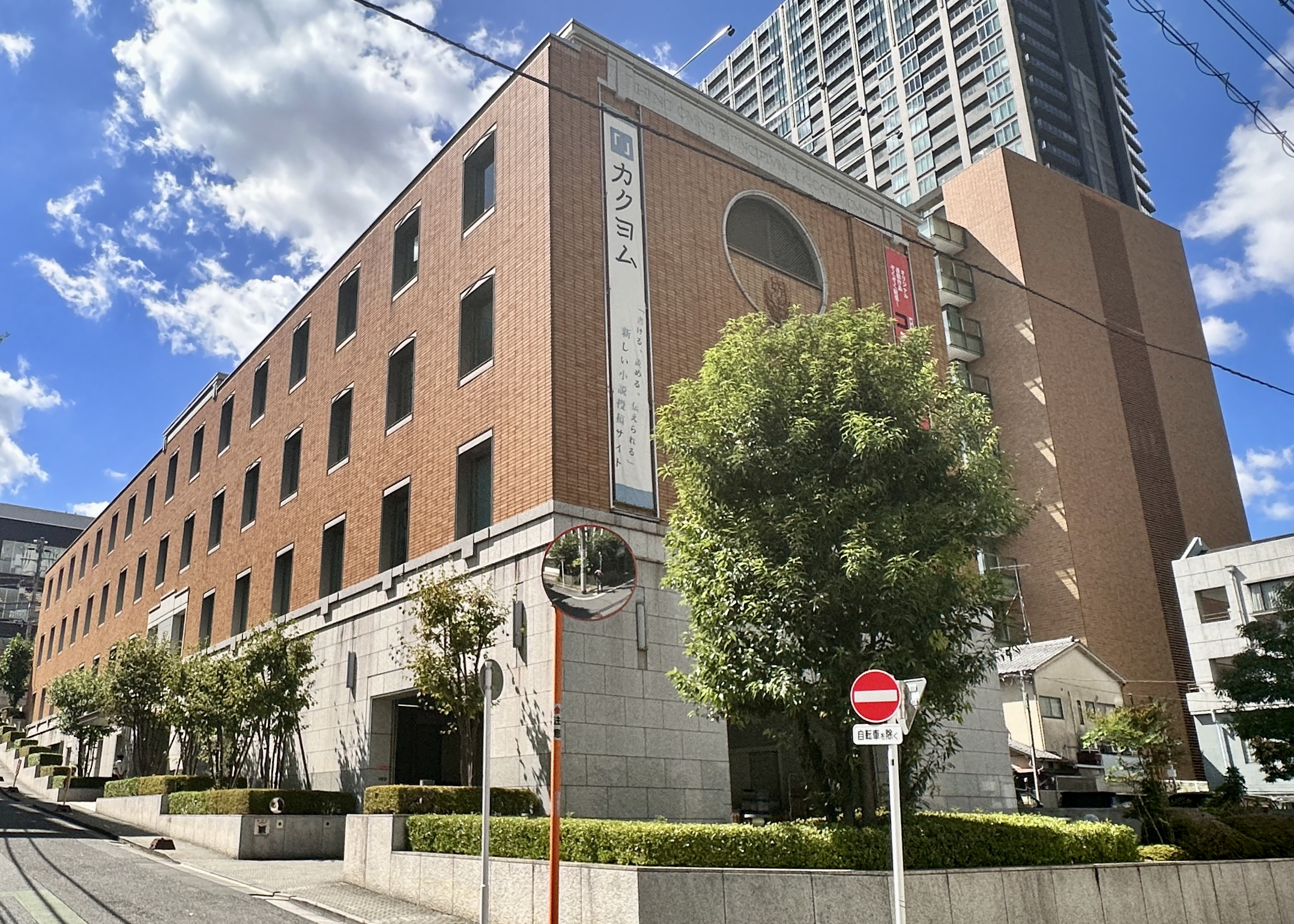
- Headquarters in Fujimi, Chiyoda, Tokyo
- Native name: 株式会社KADOKAWA
- Romanized name: Kabushiki-gaisha KADOKAWA
- Formerly: Kadokawa Dwango Corporation (2014–2019)
- Type: Public
- Traded as: TYO: 9468
- ISIN: JP3214350005
- Industry: Publishing; film; copyright; mass media; video games
- Founded: October 1, 2014; 12 years ago (as Kadokawa Dwango Corporation)
- Founder: Genyoshi Kadokawa (for the Kadokawa Shoten branch)
- Headquarters: Fujimi, Chiyoda, Tokyo, Japan
- Area served: Worldwide
- Key people: Takeshi Natsuno (CEO)
- Brands: Kadokawa Shoten; Kadokawa Magazines; Kadokawa Gakugei Shuppan; ASCII Media Works; Enterbrain; Fujimi Shobo; Media Factory; Chukei Publishing
- Revenue: ▲¥282,908 billion (FY25)
- Operating income: ▼¥8.102 billion (FY25)
- Total assets: ▼¥394,864 billion (FY25)
- Owner: Sony (11.01%)
- Number of employees: 5,349
- Website: group.kadokawa.co.jp/global/

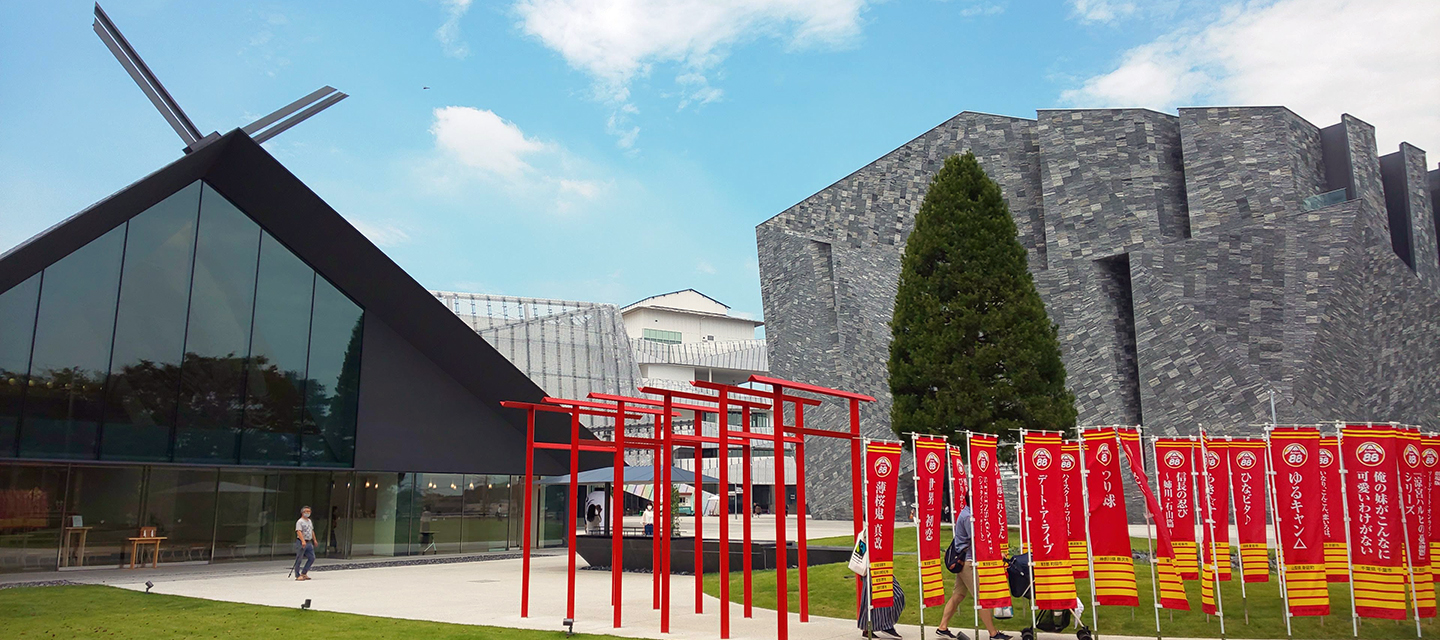
Kadokawa SakuraTown Complex in Tokorozawa, Saitama

Kadokawa Corporation (Japanese: 株式会社KADOKAWA, Hepburn: Kabushiki-gaisha Kadokawa; stylized in all caps), formerly Kadokawa Dwango Corporation (Note: Japanese: カドカワ株式会社, Hepburn: Kadokawa Kabushiki-gaisha; until October 1, 2015 株式会社KADOKAWA・DWANGO) is a Japanese conglomerate based in Fujimi, Chiyoda, Tokyo.

Created as a result of the merger of the original Kadokawa Corporation and Dwango Co., Ltd. on October 1, 2014, the company has holdings in entertainment (including anime and video game studios), publishing, and real estate among other assets.

Kadokawa is a member of the Motion Picture Producers Association of Japan (MPPAJ) and is therefore one of the youngest of Japan's Big Four film studios.

== History ==
The holding company known today as Kadokawa Corporation was originally founded in 1945 as Kadokawa Shoten, to "revitalize Japanese culture through publishing" in the postwar era. It was renamed Kadokawa Holdings on April 1, 2003, transferring the existing publishing businesses to Kadokawa Shoten Publishing. The company was again renamed Kadokawa Group Holdings on July 1, 2006. The company inherited the management and integration businesses within Kadokawa Shoten Publishing in January 2007. The magazine businesses were transferred to the Kadokawa Magazine Group. The company was renamed Kadokawa Corporation on June 22, 2013.

On October 1, 2013, nine companies in the Kadokawa Group (ASCII Media Works, Chukei Publishing, Enterbrain, Fujimi Shobo, Kadokawa Gakugei Publishing, Kadokawa Production, Kadokawa Magazines, Kadokawa Shoten and Media Factory) were merged into Kadokawa Corporation. Eight of them operate now as brand companies. Kadokawa Production was dissolved and integrated into the General IP Business Headquarters. On December 30, 2013, Kadokawa had announced that the company has acquired 100% of publisher Choubunsha.

On May 14, 2014, it was announced that Kadokawa Corporation and Dwango, the owner of Niconico, would merge on October 1, 2014, and form the new holding company Kadokawa Dwango. Both Kadokawa and Dwango became subsidiaries of the new company.

In February 2019, Kadokawa Dwango announced that Dwango would stop being its subsidiary to be a direct subsidiary of Kadokawa Corporation in a reorganization of the company. This made Kadokawa Corporation the sole subsidiary of the holding company Kadokawa Dwango.

On July 1, 2019, Kadokawa Dwango was reorganized again; only the publishing business remained in Kadokawa Corporation, and it was renamed Kadokawa Future Publishing, while Kadokawa Dwango itself became the second iteration of Kadokawa Corporation and the holding company of all of the Kadokawa Group companies. The original name Kadokawa Shoten remains as a brand and a division of Kadokawa Future Publishing.

On February 4, 2021, Kadokawa announced that the company had formed a Capital Alliance with Sony and CyberAgent to strengthen the company's creation, development, and acquisition of new IP while also maximizing use of existing IPs. As part of the agreement, both Sony and CyberAgent would receive a 1.93% stake in the company.

By August 2021, Kakao Japan had acquired an 8.3% stake in Kadokawa, making it the largest shareholder at the time. On October 29, 2021, Kadokawa announced that it had formed a capital and business alliance with Tencent, which acquired a 6.86% stake in the conglomerate for ¥30 billion ($264 million). The aim of the alliance is for Kadokawa to expand its global reach using Tencent's platforms. China, where the company has an existing joint venture with Tencent, is a particular target.

In January 2024, Kadokawa announced that they've entered a partnership with Belgium publishing company Dupuis to acquire a 51% stake in the latter's manga imprint Vega Dupuis and had launched a joint venture business with Dupuis that could bring Kadokawa's own titles as well as publishing Japanese and Korean comics to the French market named Vega SAS with Dupuis retaining a 49% stake in the now joint venture imprint.

In July 2024, the company announced that it had acquired anime studio Doga Kobo.

In November 2024, it was reported that Sony Group Corporation was in talks to acquire Kadokawa. Sony, which had acquired shares in the company in 2021, had previously discussed acquiring Kadokawa outright, but was only interested in its anime and video game assets. However, Kadokawa insisted that acquisition offers encompass the entire company.

On December 19, 2024, Sony announced a "strategic capital and business alliance" with Kadokawa, under which it acquired 12 million new shares for ¥50 billion ($320 million) on January 7, 2025, giving Sony a 10% stake and making it Kadokawa's largest single shareholder at the time. As part of the agreement, Kadokawa is set to collaborate with Sony on projects involving its IPs, including anime co-productions, live-action adaptations, and widening distribution.

In February 2025, Kadokawa announced that BookWalker and Kadokawa Connected would be transferred into Dwango, which took effect on April 1, 2025. This merger did not affect the activities of the merged companies, such as BookWalker, which retains with its brand and operations, but managed by Dwango. In May 2025, Kadokawa announced that it would acquire a 70% stake in Edizioni BD, an Italian manga publisher. Oasis Management acquired a 13.76% stake in the company in March 2026, making it the company's largest single shareholder. By June 2026, their share increased to 15.25%.

=== Arrest of chairman ===
In September 2022 chairman Tsuguhiko Kadokawa—son of founder Genyoshi—was arrested as part of a police investigation into bribery. Prosecutors alleged that the Kadokawa chairman authorized a ¥76 million payment (adjusted to ¥69 million under Japan's statute of limitations) to a consulting company with ties to a former executive of the Tokyo Olympics organizing committee in exchange for being selected as an official sponsor of the 2020 Summer Olympic and Paralympic Games. Kadokawa has denied the allegations, and his company announced that it would cooperate with the investigation. Kadokawa was indicted by prosecutors on October 4, 2022. Later that day he announced his intent to resign as the chairman of his company. He continued to deny the allegations and vowed to prove his innocence at trial.

=== 2024 ransomware attack ===
On June 8, 2024, a group of hackers called BlackSuit launched a ransomware attack on multiple websites owned by Kadokawa, including the video streaming website Niconico, resulting in most of its services being temporarily suspended. On June 27, the hacker group published a statement on the dark web, claiming responsibility for the attack and threatening to release 1.5 terabytes of stolen data, which included business partner information and user data, unless a ransom was paid.

== Kadokawa Key-Process ==
Kadokawa Key-Process Co., Ltd.
- Native name: 株式会社KADOKAWA KEY-PROCESS
- Romanized name: Kabushiki-gaisha KADOKAWA KEY - purosesu
- Formerly: Kadokawa Shoten Publishing Co., Ltd. (1945–2003); Kadokawa Holdings, Inc. (2003–2006); Kadokawa Group Holdings, Inc. (2006–2014); Kadokawa Corporation (2014–2019); Kadokawa Future Publishing (2019–2023)
- Type: Subsidiary
- Traded as: TYO: 9477
- Industry: Printing; Logistics
- Founded: April 2, 1954; 72 years ago
- Founder: Genyoshi Kadokawa
- Headquarters: Fujimi, Chiyoda, Tokyo, Japan
- Area served: Japan
- Parent: Kadokawa Corporation
- Website: keyprocess.kadokawa.co.jp

Kadokawa Key-Process Co., Ltd. (株式会社KADOKAWA KEY-PROCESS, Kabushiki-gaisha Kadokawa Key Process) is the printing and logistics arm of Kadokawa Corporation, handling printing for manga, novels, light novels, magazines, tabletop role-playing games and other type of content. The company used to be the first iteration of Kadokawa Corporation and was the parent company of the Kadokawa Group companies, which brought together several affiliated companies related to Kadokawa Shoten. Kadokawa Dwango announced a restructuring in February 2019. On July 1, 2019, Kadokawa Corporation was reorganized; the publishing business remained and the company was renamed to Kadokawa Future Publishing. Kadokawa Dwango itself became the second iteration of Kadokawa Corporation. On December 1, 2023 Kadokawa Future Publishing and Kadokawa Key-Process merged and the end result of the company changed its name to Kadokawa Future Publishing after absorption to Kadokawa Key-Process.

== Group companies ==
Kadokawa Corporation serves to bring together several affiliated Japanese companies related to Kadokawa Shoten under what is known as the Kadokawa Group. These companies are of three types: publishing, film and visuals, and cross media. The publishers primarily deal with books, bunkobon paperbacks, manga, and visual media magazines; the film and visual companies deal with Japanese feature films and DVD sales of international films and anime; the cross media companies deal with digital content, urban information and television program information magazines, along with information transmission combining paper media, the Internet, and mobile phones. Other aspects of the group are handled by the other business segment which primarily takes care of video games, real estate leasing, and comprises an advertising agency.

=== Publishing ===
- Arclight
  - Shinkigensha Co., Ltd.
- Building Book Center Co., Ltd
- Choubunsha Publishing Co.
- eb Creative
- Kadokawa ASCII Research Laboratories
  - Cool Japan Travel, Inc. (75%)
- Kadokawa Book Navi
- Kadokawa Key-Process
- Kadokawa Game Linkage
- Kadokawa LifeDesign
- Kadokawa Uplink
- Mainichi GA Hakken

=== Group media and Entertainment ===
- Acquire
- Dwango
  - Spike Chunsoft
    - Spike Chunsoft, Inc
  - Dehogallery
  - Dwango AG Entertainment
  - Dwango Music Publishing
  - GeeXPlus, Inc
    - GeeXProduction
  - Niconico
  - Project Studio Q
  - Publus Co. , Ltd.
  - Trista
  - Vaka
  - Vantan
  - Virtual Cast Co., Ltd.
  - Watanabe Amaduction
  - FromNetworks
- FromSoftware (69.66%)
- Gotcha Gotcha Games
- K.Sense (80%)
- Kadokawa Media House
- Kadokawa Uplink
- Kids Net
- Movie Walker
  - Movie Ticket
- T-Gate
- Smile Edge

=== Films and visuals ===
- Bellnox Films
- Chiptune
- Doga Kobo (80%)
- ENGI (53%)
- Glovision
- Japan Film Fund
- Kadokawa Anime
- Kadokawa Architecture
- Kadokawa Creators
- Kadokawa Daiei Studio
  - Globalgate Entertainment
- Kadokawa Kplus
- Nihon Eiga Satellite Broadcasting
- Movie Walker
- RagingBull
- Studio Kadan

=== Others ===
- Anime Tourism Association
- Customcast
- Kadokawa Architecture
- Kadokawa Contents Academy
- Kadokawa Craft
- K's Lab
- Karksa Media Partner Corporation (34%)
- Page Turner
- Tokorozawa Sakuratown Corporation
- Yellow Jam

=== Overseas ===
- Edizioni BD S.r.l (70%)
- Guangzhou Tianwen Kadokawa Animation and Comics
- Hemisphere Motion Picture Partners I
- Hemisphere Motion Picture Partners II
- Japan Manga Alliance (joint venture with Animate, Kodansha, Shueisha and Shogakukan)
  - Animate JMA (Thailand)
- Kadokawa Amarin (joint venture with Amarin Group, marketed under the brand Phoenix Next)
  - First Page Pro Company Limited
- Kadokawa Contents Academy
- Kadokawa Gempak Starz (Malaysia) (80%)
- Kadokawa Holdings Asia
  - Guangzhou Tianwen Kadokawa Animation and Comics
  - Kadokawa Taiwan Corporation
  - Kadokawa Hong Kong
  - Kadokawa Qingyu (Shanghai) Culture & Creation
  - Kadokawa Global Marketing
- Kadokawa Holdings US
- Kadokawa International Edutainment (Taiwan)
- Kadokawa Pictures America
  - Kadokawa Consulting (Thailand)
- Kadokawa World Entertainment (US)
  - Anime News Network
  - Yen Press (51%)
  - M12 Media
    - JNC Nina
  - Kadokawa Retail Ventures
- O'fan House Co., Ltd. (55％, joint venture with BY4M Studio)
- PT Phoenix Gramedia Indonesia（51％, joint venture with Kompas Gramedia))
- Sun Wah Kadokawa (Hong Kong) Group
- Sozo Pte Ltd（80.0％）
- Taiwan Animate
- Vega SAS (51%, joint venture with Éditions Dupuis SA)
- Win Graffiti Inc

==== Equid-Method Affiliated Companies ====
- Animate Oversea (33%, joint venture under Kadokawa Taiwan with Animate and United Distribution Co.)
- Animec Co., Ltd (joint venture with Aniplex)
- CPS Co., Ltd. (24.6%)
- Docomo Anime Store (40%, joint venture with NTT Docomo)
- Japan Digital Library Service Co.,Ltd. (25%, joint venture with Kinokuniya Bookstore , Kodansha, Dai Nippon Printing and Library Distribution Center)
- Kinema Citrus (31.8%, with Muneki Ogasawara and Bushiroad)
- Persol Media Switch (30%, joint venture with Persol Process & Technology Co., Ltd.)
- Production Ace (50%, joint venture with Amusement Media Academy)
- Studio Chizu Limited Liability Partnership (with Studio Chizu and Nippon Television
- Studio White Limited Liability Partnership (joint venture with LINE Digital Frontier and Redice Studio)
- Ize Press Ltd (joint venture between Yen Press and Redice Studio)

==== Former subsidiaries ====
- Asmik Ace
- Daihyakka News: Merged with Dwango in July 2019.
- Kadokawa Entertainment: On November 1, 2009, Kadokawa Entertainment was merged into Kadokawa Pictures.
- Kadokawa Group Publishing: On April 1, 2013, Kadokawa Group Publishing was merged into Kadokawa Group Holdings.
- Kadokawa Games: In May 2022, Kadokawa Games divested its business into a separate company called Dragami Games, including its IPs.
- Kadokawa J:COM Media: Established in November 2005 as a joint venture between Kadokawa Shoten and J:COM. It was eliminated in June 2010.
- So-net Kadokawa Link: Established on June 27, 2007, with So-net Entertainment (43.5%), Kadokawa Mobile (43.5%), and Dentsu E-link (13.0%).
- Kadokawa Mobile and Movie Gate: On October 1, 2009, Kadokawa Mobile merged with Movie Gate to form Kadokawa Contents Gate.
- Kadokawa Production: On October 1, 2013, the company was dissolved and integrated into Kadokawa Corporation.
- Mages: On July 12, 2019, Mages was acquired by Chiyomaru Studio, a concept and copyright company also headed by Mages CEO.
- MediaLeaves: On January 10, 2010, MediaLeaves was merged into Enterbrain.
- NTT Prime Square: On November 30, 2010, Fan service ended a joint venture with NTT.
- Sarugakucho: Became part of Kadokawa Group Holdings under Enterbrain during the ASCII acquisition. On March 31, 2010, Pole To Win announced that it has acquired Sarugakucho.
- Studio Lide: Closed in April 2019.
- Words Gear: On September 26, 2006, Panasonic announced the establishment of Words Gear with Kadokawa Mobile and Tokyo Broadcasting System, effective on October 2, 2006. On September 30, 2010, Kadokawa Group Holdings announced that it will merging Words Gear into Kadokawa Contents Gate, with Kadokawa Contents Gate as the surviving company, effective on January 1, 2011.

== See also ==
- ASCII Media Works – They split from Kadokawa, but became a subsidiary of Kadokawa again.
- D.League
- Pixel Game Maker MV
