= Diana Garnet =

American singer

Diana Garnet ダイアナ・ガーネット
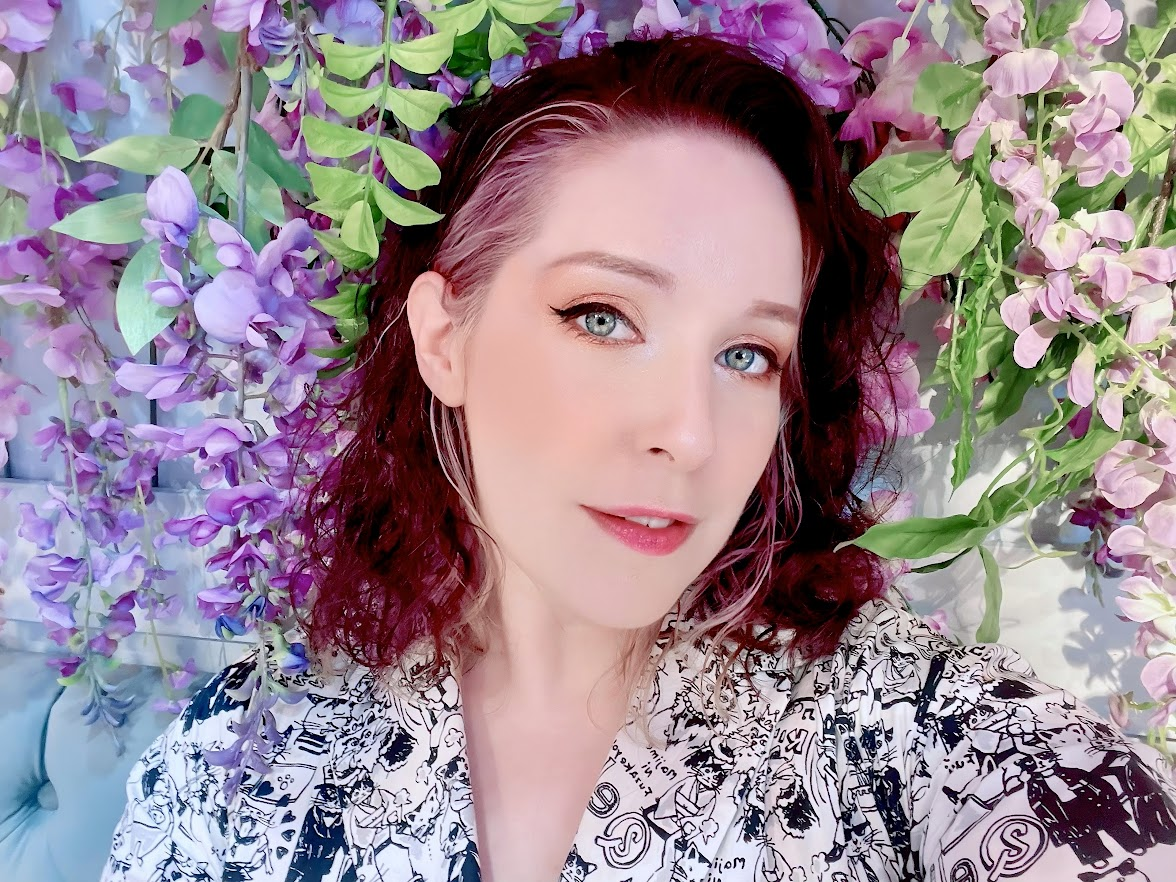

Background information
- Also known as: Lumin Tsukiboshi; Lumin; 月星るみん
- Born: Diana Caroline Garnett; August 25; Washington D.C., U.S.
- Genres: J-pop; Anime song
- Occupations: Singer; Voice actor; Voice director; Casting director
- Years active: 2013–present
- Labels: Sony Music Entertainment Japan; pointblanc INC; Project DAWN; Autodidactic Studios
- Website: dianagarnetvoice.com

Diana Caroline Garnett (Japanese: ダイアナ・キャロライン・ガーネット, Hepburn: Daiana Kyarorain Gānetto, born August 25), known professionally as Diana Garnet, is an American-born J-pop singer and voice actor. They are signed to Mastersix Foundation under Sony Music Entertainment Japan.

== Biography ==
Born in Washington, D.C., Diana was influenced by their father, a fan of anime and manga, and grew up interested in Japanese culture. They were influenced by Japanese music used in anime, which motivated them to pursue a singing career in Japan.

Their interest in the country was further sparked by two year-long exchanges in Japan in both high school and university. Upon graduating from university, they relocated to Tokyo, Japan, to work as an Assistant Language Teacher while doing freelance narration and vocals for radio and advertisements.

They began uploading covers of anime, J-pop and vocaloid songs onto YouTube and Niconico, gaining popularity and attention under their aliases Tonkhai and トンカイ.

=== 2013–2014: Nodojiman The World, Japanese Debut and Cover☆Girl ===
Diana appeared on NTV's singing competition "Nodojiman The World" and won the Spring 2013 edition.

Following their victory, they signed with Sony Music Entertainment Japan and made their major debut on October 22, 2013, with their first single "Mata Kimi ni Koi shiteru", under Mastersix Foundation and Sony Music Records.

A cover album named "Cover☆Girl", compiling the tracks "Mata Kimi ni Koi shiteru" and "My Revolution" from their first single among other covers of songs like Judy and Mary's "Sobakasu", Zone's "Secret base (Kimi ga kureta mono)" and Yoko Takahashi's "Zankoku Tenshi na These" was released on November 27.

=== 2014–2015: Featured artist, Spinning World and Nankai! Mystery ===
2014 saw Diana being featured as an artist in Dohzi-T's track "Turn Me On ft. Diana Garnet", released on March 19 on his sixth studio album "T's Music".

The title track of their first original single, "Spinning World", released on February 11, 2015, was used as the ending theme song for the anime Naruto: Shippuden and grew to be one of the most beloved songs to their fans. As of 2024, the song has amassed more than 2 million plays on Spotify.

They promoted their first theme song feature with appearances on TV shows like TV Tokyo's "Animemashite" and variety shows like TV Asahi's "Kanjani8 no The Mozart: Ongakuō No.1 Ketteisen".

On February 25, Japanese rock band Flow released their compilation album Flow Anime Best Kiwami, featuring Diana on their cover track "Blue Bird ft. Diana Garnet", originally by Japanese pop-rock band Ikimono-gakari. On August 15, the singer, as well as the band Granrodeo, went on to perform with the band as guest performers on their Flow World Tour 2015: Kiwami world tour finale in the Hibiya Open-Air Concert Hall in Chiyoda, Tokyo.

Diana's second original single, Nankai! Mystery, was released on November 25. Its title track was chosen to be the theme song of the anime adaptation of the original light novel series Tantei Team KZ Jiken Note.

=== 2017–2018: Voice actor, Igo Focus, Radio host and Thank you for the Music ===
In 2017, Diana branched out in their engagements, appearing in many events in Japan like the KIDSTONE Summer Presentation Program and stateside anime and manga conventions, like Ohayocon and Animazement, as well as on TV and in print. They also took on voice acting, narration and becoming a TV host.

In February, they first provided their voice for English-speaking roles of Joule and Lumen the double identities of the heroine of Azure Striker Gunvolt, in the English dub of the original video anime adaptation of the game, released worldwide on the Nintendo eShop.

In March, they provided the voice for the main character Koko in the English Dub of the anime film Shimajiro and the Rainbow Oasis. Later on in 2018, they also lent their voice to the main character Aura in the English Dub for the anime film Shimajiro the Movie: Adventures on Magic Island.

From April until March 2018, Diana was the host for the 2017 season of the long-running series Igo Focus, an establishment in the Japanese world of Go.

Since April, they have been one of the co-hosts of the educational NHK radio show "Kiso Eigo 1", a main staple among language education in Japan since its first broadcast in 1994. As of 2024, alongside fellow co-host Chris Nelson, they possess one of the longest tenures a co-host of this radio show has ever had.

During the same time they also narrated the NHK World series "Anime Supernova", highlighting different directors in the Japanese animation industry for a global audience. They also landed their first Japanese-speaking role for the dramatization of Yushi Okajima's book "Gijinka de manabo! IT Infra no shikumi", voicing the role of DBMS.

Later in the year, they provided their voice for English-speaking roles in several games, like Super Bomberman R and released their third original single, "Thank you for the Music", on November 7. The title track was chosen to be the second ending theme for the third season of the anime series "Meow Meow Japanese History".

=== 2019–2020: Game OSTs, Hello Again and Igo no uta ===
2019 marked Diana's participation in original soundtracks for video games, as they performed the theme songs of the two video games Nippon Marathon, "Hyperlove Racing", and Dragon Marked for Death, "Faranaja".

The year also saw them venturing into acting, as they appeared in the January TV Kanagawa drama "Shiba Kōen", the February commercial short movie "Man'yō ni Ikō." for hot spring hotel chain Manyo Club and the June Line Live web drama "Shibuya Boys Scramble".

On June 5, they released their first digital single, "Hello Again", providing the first ending theme for the fourth season of "Meow Meow Japanese History".

They continued to pursue voice acting and appeared in Japanese-speaking roles in the anime series "Meow Meow Japanese History" they had previously provided ending themes for, voicing historical characters like Heian period buddhist monk Taihan in February, samurai Egawa Hidetatsu and legendary folk hero Ishikawa Goemon later on in June. In an English-speaking role, they voiced Sophia in the Japanese AMG Entertainment movie "Prison 13" in August.

2020 saw Diana contributing more theme songs and participating in live performances throughout the year.

On January 15, 2020, they released their fifth original single, "Igo no uta". The single contains the cooperation of several individuals: professional Go players Yohei Shimojima penning the lyrics and Asami Ueno designing the cover, singer Chris Hart composing the song with musician Paul Ballard and mangaka Nodoka Tsurimaki drawing the cover art.

They went on to perform the theme songs "Fight Yourself" for the readers theater play "Dragon Zakura~2nd season~" in January and "Here and Now" for the visual novel Caffeine: Victoria's Legacy in March, for which they also voiced the main character Eliza.

=== 2021–2024: Further voice acting, ADR directing, Tie-up releases and Lumin ===
In 2021 and 2022, Diana continued to voice act, lending their voice bilingually to both Japanese and English-speaking roles.

Since February, they have been voicing the Japanese-speaking role of Japanese English teacher Momo Tomozawa, a main character of the well-received Benesse franchise "Kūsō Gakuen Pantasia". They appeared in the animated Netflix series "Bee and Puppycat" as the TempBot in September.

Diana also worked as a casting director and voice-over director on several games, namely "Rival Megagun XE", "Gunvolt Chronicles: Luminous Avenger iX 2" and "Azure Striker Gunvolt 3".

In December, they voiced the Genshin Impact character Dehya in the Dillongoo Studios web anime short "Nameless Road" for MiHoYo's regular fan event "HoyoFair 2023". This marked the beginning of Diana's collaborations with DillonGoo and Dillongoo Studios projects.

2023 saw Diana create their first manga series, "MIKU's NY Broadway Diary", providing the story for the series, while artist Nobile provided the art. The series was first released the "Radio Chūgakusei no Kiso Eigo Level 1" educational book series in March, published by NHK Shuppan. The last chapter was released in February 2024.

On April 15, they released their second digital single "Genshindou", providing the theme song for the first ("The Shogunate") and fourth episodes ("Visiting Neo Inazuma") of the MiHoYo commissioned Genshin Impact alternate universe anime series, "Progenitor". Remixes of the song would also be featured as the opening and ending themes for episode 2 ("Albedo"). Furthermore, Diana voiced the character Klee for the series. As Klee, they contributed the character song "Klee's Lullaby" for the original soundtrack of the series.

On July 28, Diana released their third digital single "Heiwa Sanka", the theme song for the Yostar commissioned Arknights alternate universe anime short film "Legend of Chongyue". Diana also contributed to the short film as a casting and voice director.

On October 19, they released their first duet single, "Kegareta Michi e no Tatakai", with Norwegian singer and YouTuber PelleK. The music video was shot in Hjertnes Kulturhus in Sandefjord, Norway.

On October 31, Diana performed the theme song "Ruby Red Shoes" for AstralShift's acclaimed visual novel "Little Goody Two Shoes". They also voiced Elise, the protagonist of the game, and contributed the character song "Ruby Mirage Slippers" as said character for the original soundtrack of the game.

In December, they performed as a guest performer in the Yokohama leg of Flow's domestic tour, "FLOW THE CARNIVAL 2023: NARUTO Shibari". The concert was recorded and broadcast on Space Shower TV as a TV special on February 7, 2024, and later released as on Blu-ray and CD.

On February 11, 2024, Diana's VTuber character Lumin Tsukiboshi debuted through her first livestream. Originally introduced on a character sheet on September 20, 2023. The character maintains in her livestreams that Lumin and Diana are to be seen as two different entities, with "Diana Garnet" being her family-friendly real life identity with commitments to their clients, while "Lumin" would be able to interact with fans more and cover songs that wouldn't necessarily align with Diana Garnet's public image. Whenever Lumin alludes to her real life, she would refer to her persona "Diana Garnet" as "the voice inside". Lumin would pursue activities as a music artist under the name "Lumin".

Diana also provided vocals for the character song "No Name (English ver.)" of ninja Asahi, a character of the Bank of Innovation smartphone game "MementoMori".

In July, they performed the theme song "Set Sail" for the summer event "Beauty Full Shot" of the Shift Up smart phone game "Goddess of Victory: Nikke".

In October, Diana performed the character song "Lamb's Requiem" and co-wrote four different character songs for the Inti Creates game "Card-en-Ciel".

They also provided vocals for the theme of the video game "The 257th Element" in August and performed the theme for the video game "Starlight Re:Volver" in December.

In December, Diana's tenth digital single "Michibiki no Hoshi" provided the theme song for the fifth ("Invasion") and the final sixth episodes ("Keep Moving Forward") of the MiHoYo commissioned Genshin Impact alternate universe anime series, "Progenitor".

=== 2025–present ===
In January 2025, Diana released their eleventh digital single "In Another Story", providing the theme for the MiHoYo commissioned Honkai: Star Rail alternate universe anime short film, "Millennium Idol: In Another Life".

In March, their twelfth digital single in collaboration with music producer RichaadEB and singer Little V was a cover of "Kingslayer" (originally by Bring Me the Horizon featuring Babymetal).

In July, Diana contributed their vocals for the ending theme "Sono Saki no Sora e" ("The Sky Ahead") for upcoming Netflix anime series adaptation of the novel Leviathan by Scott Westerfeld, penned by Joe Hisaishi and arranged by Nobuko Toda and Kazuma Jinnouchi." A year prior in July 2024, production company Qubic Pictures teased the singer's live performance of the song at their panel discussing the anime series at Otakon.

In August, their thirteenth digital single "Kimi no Shiranai Monogatari (Alice Thymefield Version)" (originally by Supercell) was released to commemorate their role of Alice Thymefield in the video game Zenless Zone Zero.

In December, Diana's fourteenth digital single "Spinning World (10 Year Anniversary Version)" was released to commemorate the ten year release anniversary of their first original single "Spinning World".

In January 2026, they contributed lyrics and, along Tateshi Starwalker, also their vocals for "Straight to the Top", an insert song for the anime Medalist, composed by Yuki Hayashi.

In October, Diana's first original EP "Rise" was released in a limited physical run at Cosplay Mania. Their fifteenth digital single "Yuzurenai Negai" (originally by Naomi Tamura) was also released.

== Personal life ==
Diana identifies as non-binary.

== Discography ==
=== Studio albums ===
Release date	Title	Album details	Track list	Peak chart positions
Release date	Title	Album details	Track list	JPN
2013/11/27	Cover☆Girl [ja]	Album details: Label: Sony Music Records (SRCL-8422); Formats: CD, digital download	Track list: 1. Sobakasu (そばかす); 2. My Revolution; 3. Secret base (Kimi ga kureta mono) (secret base 〜君がくれたもの〜); 4. Akai Sweet Pea (赤いスイートピー); 5. Mikazuki (三日月); 6. Mata Kimi ni Koi shiteru (また君に恋してる); 7. Suki ni natte, yokatta (好きになって、よかった); 8. Chiisa na Koi no uta (小さな恋のうた); 9. Haru (Spring) (春〜spring〜); 10. Yuki no Hana (雪の華); 11. DEPARTURES; 12. Ito (糸); 13. Arigatō (ありがとう); 14. Zankoku na Tenshi no These (Bonus Track) (残酷な天使のテーゼ 〜Bonus Track〜)	105

=== EP ===
Release date	Title	Album details	Track list
2026/10/04	Rise	Album details: Label: Diana Garnet; Formats: CD, digital download	Track list TBA

=== Singles ===
Release date	Title	Album details	Track list	Peak chart positions
Release date	Title	Album details	Track list	JPN
2013/10/13	Mata Kimi ni Koi shiteru [ja]	Album details: Label: Mastersix Foundation, Sony Music Records (SRCL-8372); Formats: CD, digital download	Track list: 1. Mata Kimi ni Koi shiteru (また君に恋してる); 2. My Revolution; 3. ENDLESS STORY	133
2015/02/11	Spinning World [ja]	Album details: Label: Mastersix Foundation, Sony Music Records (SRCL-8679-80, SRCL-8681); Formats: CD, digital download; Versions: Regular Edition, Limited Edition	Track list: 1. Spinning World; 2. Diana Anthem; 3. Zōni Glory (雑煮GLORY); 4. Spinning World (Anime Ver); 5. Spinning World (Instrumental)	139
2015/11/25	Nankai! Mystery [ja]	Album details: Label: Mastersix Foundation, Sony Music Records (SRCL-8941/2, SRCL-8943); Formats: CD, digital download; Versions: Regular Edition, Limited Edition	Track list: 1. Nankai! Mystery (難解! ミステリー); 2. LayBo DunBo (冷BO暖BO); 3. Sorairo Days (空色デイズ); 4. Nankai! Mystery (難解! ミステリー) (Anime Ver.); 5. Nankai! Mystery (難解! ミステリー) (Instrumental)	—
2018/11/07	Thank you for the Music [ja]	Album details: Label: pointblanc INC (PTBC-0006); Formats: CD, digital download	Track list: 1. Thank you for the Music; 2. My Life; 3. Thank you for the Music (Instrumental)	—
2020/01/15	Igo no uta [ja]	Album details: Label: Project DAWN (PDJY-0001); Formats: CD, digital download	Track list: 1. Igo no uta (いごのうた); 2. What's Igo; 3. Igo no uta (Karaoke Version) (いごのうた(カラオケバージョン))	—

=== Digital singles ===
As Diana Garnet

Release date	Title	Album details	Track list
2019/06/05	Hello Again [ja]	Album details: Label: pointblanc INC; Formats: Digital download	Track list: 1. Hello Again; 2. Hello Again (Instrumental)
2023/04/15	Genshindou [ja]	Album details: Label: Autodidactic Studios; Formats: Digital download	Track list (Regular version): 1. Genshindou (現振動, Genshindō); 2. Genshindou (現振動, Genshindō) (Instrumental Version); 3. Genshindou (現振動, Genshindō) (Retro Remix)
2023/04/15	Genshindou [ja]	Album details: Label: Autodidactic Studios; Formats: Digital download	Track list (All versions): 1. Genshindou (現振動, Genshindō); 2. Genshindou (現振動, Genshindō) (Cyberpunk Remix); 3. Genshindou (現振動, Genshindō) (WF Cyberpunk B-Side Remix); 4. Genshindou (現振動, Genshindō) (Retro Remix); 5. Genshindou (現振動, Genshindō) (PelleK x Raon Cover)
2023/07/28	Heiwa Sanka [ja]	Album details: Label: Autodidactic Studios; Formats: Digital download	Track list: 1. Heiwa Sanka (平和賛歌); 2. Heiwa Sanka (平和賛歌) (Instrumental Version)
2023/09/15	Genshindou (Cyberpunk Remix) [ja]	Album details: Label: Autodidactic Studios; Formats: Digital download	Track list: 1. Genshindou (現振動, Genshindō) (Cyberpunk Remix); 2. Genshindou (現振動, Genshindō) (Cyberpunk Remix Instrumental); 3. Genshindou (現振動, Genshindō) (WF Cyberpunk B-Side Remix)
2023/10/19	Kegareta Michi e no Tatakai [ja]	Album details: Label: PelleK; Formats: Digital download	Track list: 1. Kegareta Michi e no Tatakai (穢れた道への闘い)
2023/12/29	Macaron Memories [ja]	Album details: Label: Autodidactic Studios; Formats: Digital download	Track list: 1. Macaron Memories
2024/02/15	Idol	Album details: Label: Lumin; Formats: Digital download	Track list: 1. Idol (アイドル)
2024/03/15	Yoidore Shirazu [ja]	Album details: Label: Lumin; Formats: Digital download	Track list: 1. Yoidore Shirazu (酔いどれ知らず)
2024/03/31	God-ish	Album details: Label: Lumin; Formats: Digital download	Track list: 1. God-ish (神っぽいな, Kamippoi na)
2024/05/20	Ch4nge [ja]	Album details: Label: Lumin; Formats: Digital download	Track list: 1. Ch4nge
2024/07/03	Phony	Album details: Label: Lumin; Formats: Digital download	Track list: 1. Phony (フォニイ)
2024/09/06	Kagayaku [ja]	Album details: Label: Autodidactic Studios; Formats: Digital download	Track list: 1. Kagayaku (輝く); 2. Kagayaku (輝く) (Instrumental Version)
2024/09/20	Sweet Tooth [ja]	Album details: Label: Diana Garnet; Formats: Digital download	Track list: 1. Sweet Tooth (甘党, Amatō)
2024/12/05	Revolution	Album details: Label: Starlight Re:Volver; Formats: Digital download	Track list: 1. Revolution; 2. Revolution (Trailer Edit); 3. Revolution (Karaoke Edition)
2024/12/28	Michibiki no Hoshi [ja]	Album details: Label: Autodidactic Studios; Formats: Digital download	Track list: 1. Michibiki no Hoshi (導きの星); 2. Michibiki no Hoshi (導きの星) (Instrumental Version)
2025/01/02	In Another Story [ja]	Album details: Label: Autodidactic Studios; Formats: Digital download	Track list: 1. In Another Story; 2. In Another Story (Instrumental Version)
2025/03/24	Kingslayer	Album details: Label: RichaadEB; Formats: Digital download	Track list: 1. Kingslayer with RichaadEB & Little V.
2025/08/07	Kimi no Shiranai Monogatari (Alice Thymefield Version)	Album details: Label: Diana Garnet; Formats: Digital download	Track list: 1. Kimi no Shiranai Monogatari (君の知らない物語) (Alice Thymefield Version)
2025/12/25	Spinning World (10 Year Anniversary Version) [ja]	Album details: Label: Diana Garnet; Formats: Digital download	Track list: 1. Spinning World (10 Year Anniversary Version)
2026/10/07	Yuzurenai Negai	Album details: Label: Lumin; Formats: Digital download	Track list: 1. Yuzurenai Negai (ゆずれない願い)

As Lumin

Release date	Title	Album details	Track list
2023/12/29	Macaron Memories [ja]	Album details: Label: Autodidactic Studios; Formats: Digital download	Track list: 1. Macaron Memories
2024/02/15	Idol	Album details: Label: Lumin; Formats: Digital download	Track list: 1. Idol (アイドル)
2024/03/15	Yoidore Shirazu [ja]	Album details: Label: Lumin; Formats: Digital download	Track list: 1. Yoidore Shirazu (酔いどれ知らず)
2024/03/31	God-ish	Album details: Label: Lumin; Formats: Digital download	Track list: 1. God-ish (神っぽいな, Kamippoi na)
2024/05/20	Ch4nge [ja]	Album details: Label: Lumin; Formats: Digital download	Track list: 1. Ch4nge
2024/07/03	Phony	Album details: Label: Lumin; Formats: Digital download	Track list: 1. Phony (フォニイ)
2024/09/20	Sweet Tooth [ja]	Album details: Label: Lumination Records; Formats: Digital download	Track list: 1. Sweet Tooth (甘党, Amatō)
2024/12/28	Michibiki no Hoshi [ja]	Album details: Label: Autodidactic Studios; Formats: Digital download	Track list: 1. Michibiki no Hoshi (導きの星); 2. Michibiki no Hoshi (導きの星) (Instrumental Version)
2025/01/02	In Another Story [ja]	Album details: Label: Autodidactic Studios; Formats: Digital download	Track list: 1. In Another Story; 2. In Another Story (Instrumental Version)
2025/08/03	Where Friends Meet: The Official OffKai Expo Theme Song	Album details: Label: Hollow Records; Formats: Digital download	Track list: 1. Where Friends Meet with Freyja Cesteline, Kuwanano, MUGA, Nana Asteria, Rio Fukai, Seion Aera, Silvi Mikazuki, Vedra, Xiulan Long & Yura Rikudou; 2. Where Friends Meet (Instrumental Version)
2026/10/07	Yuzurenai Negai	Album details: Label: Lumin; Formats: Digital download	Track list: 1. Yuzurenai Negai (ゆずれない願い)

=== Tie-ups ===
Year	Title	Tie-up
2015	Spinning World	32nd ending theme of TV Tokyo anime series "Naruto: Shippuden"
2015	Nankai! Mystery (難解!ミステリー)	Theme song of NHK E anime series "Tantei Team KZ Jiken Note"
2017	Tomodachi no Wow! (トモダチのわお！) (English Ver.)	Theme song of anime film "Shimajiro and the Rainbow Oasis" (English dub) ※Duet, credited as Diana Garnet & Jyongri
2018	Thank you for the Music	2nd ending theme of NHK E anime series "Meow Meow Japanese History" season 3
2019	Hyperlove Racing	Insert song of video game "Nippon Marathon"
2019	My Life	Opening theme of FM FUJI radio show "Yashiro to Tabi to Ongaku to"
2019	My Life	Insert song of web drama "Shibuya Boys Scramble" episode 3
2019	Faranaja (家路 (ファラナジャ))	Theme song of video game "Dragon Marked for Death"
2019	Hello Again	1st ending theme of NHK E anime series "Meow Meow Japanese History" season 4
2020	Fight Yourself	Opening theme of readers theater play "Dragon Zakura~2nd season~"
2020	Here and Now	Ending theme of visual novel "Caffeine: Victoria's Legacy"
2021	Rumbly in My Tumbly	Insert songs of smartphone game "Disney Music Parade"
2021	Whistle While You Work	Insert songs of smartphone game "Disney Music Parade"
2021	Zenryoku Seikatsu!!! (全力生活!!!)	Character songs of manga series "Kūsō Gakuen Pantasia" ※Credited as Momo Tomozawa
2021	Natsu no Owari, Kimi wo Omou (夏の終わり、君を想う)	Character songs of manga series "Kūsō Gakuen Pantasia" ※Credited as Momo Tomozawa
2022	Fuyu no Kioku (冬の記憶)	Character songs of manga series "Kūsō Gakuen Pantasia" ※Credited as Momo Tomozawa
2022	MomoNaru Perfect English! (ももなるパーフェクトイングリッシュ！)	Character song of manga series "Kūsō Gakuen Pantasia" ※Duet, credited as MomoNaru
2023	Genshindou (現振動, Genshindō)	Theme song of MiHoYo Genshin Impact alternate universe web anime series "Progenitor" episodes 1 ("The Shogunate") & 4 ("Visiting Neo Inazuma")
2023	Genshindou (現振動, Genshindō) (Retro Remix)	Ending theme of MiHoYo Genshin Impact alternate universe web anime series "Progenitor" episode 2 ("Albedo")
2023	Klee's Lullaby	Character song of MiHoYo Genshin Impact alternate universe web anime series "Progenitor" episode 1 ("The Shogunate") ※Credited as Klee
2023	Heiwa Sanka (平和賛歌)	Theme song of Yostar Arknights alternate universe web anime short film "Legend of Chongyue"
2023	Seishun Song (青春ソング)	Character song of manga series "Kūsō Gakuen Pantasia" ※Duet, credited as MomoNaru
2023	Genshindou (現振動, Genshindō) (Cyberpunk Remix)	Opening theme of MiHoYo Genshin Impact alternate universe web anime series "Progenitor" episode 2 ("Albedo")
2023	Ruby Red Shoes	Theme song of visual novel "Little Goody Two Shoes"
2023	Ruby Mirage Slippers	Character song of visual novel "Little Goody Two Shoes" ※Credited as Elise
2023	Macaron Memories	Theme song of MiHoYo Genshin Impact alternate universe web anime short film "Cyber Fontaine: The Last Bakery"
2024	Show	Character song cover of manga series "Kūsō Gakuen Pantasia" ※Credited as Momo Tomozawa
2024	No Name (English ver.)	Character song of smartphone game "MementoMori" (English dub) ※Credited as Asahi
2024	Said Nothing	Character song of manga series "Kūsō Gakuen Pantasia" ※Credited as Momo Tomozawa
2024	Set Sail	Theme song of Shift Up smartphone game "Goddess of Victory: Nikke" summer event "Beauty, Full Shot"
2024	257 Drops of Rain	Theme song of REAL Co.Ltd visual novel "The 257th Element" (English dub)
2024	Tabula Rasa (タブラ・ラサ)	Character song of manga series "Kūsō Gakuen Pantasia" ※Credited as Momo Tomozawa
2024	Kagayaku (輝く)	Theme song of MiHoYo Genshin Impact alternate universe web anime series "Genshin Elemental Warfare" episode 3 ("Fight at the Museum")
2024	Sensei minna de Utau! Benkyō Song Medley (先生みんなで歌う！勉強ソングメドレー)	Character song medley of manga series "Kūsō Gakuen Pantasia" ※Group performance, credited as Naruri, Momo Tomozawa, Satomi Aomi, Ryūta Akagi, Osamu Midorigaoka & Raymond Turner
2024	Lamb's Requiem	Character song of video game "Card-en-Ciel" (English dub) ※Credited as Raffaella
2024	Revolution	Theme song of video game "Starlight Re:Volver"
2024	Michibiki no Hoshi (導きの星)	Theme song of MiHoYo Genshin Impact alternate universe web anime series "Progenitor" episodes 5 ("Invasion") & 6 ("Keep Moving Forward")
2025	In Another Story	Theme song of MiHoYo Honkai: Star Rail alternate universe web anime short film "Millennium Idol: In Another Life"
2025	Baby love! Baby please! (English Ver.)	Theme song of anime series "Isekai Onsen Paradise" (English dub) ※Group performance, credited as Diana Garnet, Laura Welsh, Betty BAT & Miann
2025	Where Friends Meet	Theme song of VTuber convention "OffKai Expo Gen 4" ※Group performance, credited as Freyja Cesteline, Kuwanano, Lumin, MUGA, Nana Asteria, Rio Fukai, Seion Aera, Silvi Mikazuki, Vedra, Xiulan Long & Yura Rikudou
2025	Zenshin Machine Girls (戦え!マシンガールZu, Tatakae! Mashin Gāruzu) (English Ver.)	Theme song of video game "Full Metal Schoolgirl" (English dub) ※Duet, credited as Ryoko Arahabaki & Akemi Minamiazabu
2025	The Sky Ahead (その先の空へ, Sono Saki no Sora e)	Ending theme of Netflix anime series "Leviathan"
2025	Please trust me!	Theme song of MiHoYo Genshin Impact alternate universe web anime "Please trust me! Genshin Impact Fan Musical" ※Group performance, credited as Kuraiinu, Nanase Cain, Diana Garnet, Hannah Grace, chiisa, Miann, Angel Haven Ray, Kaye, AJ Sparks & Stella
2025	Nikke in Kyoto Theme Song: Hannari Biyori (NIKKE in KYOTO THEME SONG 〜はんなり日和〜)	Theme song of Shift Up smartphone game "Goddess of Victory: Nikke" collaboration event "Nikke in Kyōto: Hannari Stamp Kaiyū Tabi"
2026	Straight to the Top	Insert song of anime series "Medalist" ※Duet, credited as Diana Garnet & Tateshi Starwalker
TBA	Shining Party	Theme song of video game "WonderPaws"
TBA	TBA	Song of original animated cartoon "Par: A Normal Girl"

=== Features ===
As Diana Garnet

Artist	Release date	Title	Album details	Track list
Daddy	2013/04/29	Herosyndrome Kizuna (Herosyndrome KIZUNA ～絆～)	Album details: Label: Indies; Format: CD	Track list: 2. Omoi tatta ga Kichijitsu! (思いたったが吉日！) (Club Mix)
Dohzi-T	2014/03/19	T's Music [ja]	Album details: Label: Universal Music Group (UPCH-20342); Formats: CD, digital download	Track list: 5. Turn Me On feat. Diana Garnet
Flow	2015/02/25	Flow Anime Best: Kiwami (FLOW ANIME BEST 極) [ja]	Album details: Label: Ki/oon Music (KSCL-2559); Formats: CD, digital download	Track list: 17. Blue Bird feat. Diana Garnet (ブルーバード feat. ダイアナガーネット)
V.A.	2016/07/06	Naruto the Best	Album details: Label: Aniplex (SVWC-70175); Formats: CD, digital download	Track list: 6. Spinning World
V.A.	2019/01/25	Nippon Marathon (Original Soundtrack)	Album details: Label: Onion Soup Interactive; Format: Digital download	Track list: 16. Hyperlove Racing (feat. Diana Garnet); 22. Hyperlove Racing (Karaoke Version)
Inti Creates	2019/03/01	Dragon Marked For Death Soundtrack	Album details: Label: Inti Creates (INTIR-042/043); Format: CD	Track list: 28. Falanaja (家路 (ファラナジャ))
Kikai Digital	2020/03/27	Caffeine: Victoria's Legacy OST	Album details: Label: Kikai Digital; Format: Digital download	Track list: 24. Here and Now; 25. Here and Now (Instrumental)
Autodidactic Studios	2023/04/28	Progenitor: The Shogunate (Original Animation Soundtrack)	Album details: Label: Autodidactic Studios; Format: Digital download	Track list: 1. Genshindou (現振動, Genshindō); 6. Genshindou (現振動, Genshindō) (Instrumental Version); 7. Genshindou (現振動, Genshindō) (Retro Remix)
Autodidactic Studios	2023/07/28	Legend of Chongyue (Original Animation Soundtrack)	Album details: Label: Autodidactic Studios; Format: Digital download	Track list: 1. Heiwa Sanka (平和賛歌); 7. Heiwa Sanka (平和賛歌) (Instrumental Version)
Flow	2023/08/30	Flow the Cover: Naruto Shibari (FLOW THE COVER 〜NARUTO縛り〜)	Album details: Label: Sacra Music (VVCL-2340-42, VVCL-2343); Formats: CD, digital download; Versions: Regular Edition, First Press Limited Edition	Track list: 7. Blue Bird (Naruto Shibari Mix ver.) feat. Diana Garnet (ブルーバード (NARUTO縛りMix ver.) feat. ダイアナガーネット)
Autodidactic Studios	2023/09/23	Progenitor: Albedo (Original Animation Soundtrack)	Album details: Label: Autodidactic Studios; Format: Digital download	Track list: 1. Genshindou (現振動, Genshindō) (Cyberpunk Remix); 7. Genshindou (現振動, Genshindō) (Retro Remix); 8. Genshindou (現振動, Genshindō) (Cyberpunk Remix Instrumental); 9. Genshindou (現振動, Genshindō) (WF Cyberpunk B-Side Remix)
AstralShift	2023/10/31	Little Goody Two Shoes (Official Game Soundtrack) (Side A)	Album details: Label: AstralShift; Format: Digital download	Track list: 1. Ruby Red Shoes
AstralShift	2023/10/31	Little Goody Two Shoes (Official Game Soundtrack) (Side B)	Album details: Label: AstralShift; Format: Digital download	Track list: 23. Ruby Red Shoes (OFF Vocal)
PelleK	2023/11/01 (Vinyl) 2024/01/17 (Digital)	Muteki no Tabiji	Album details: Label: PelleK; Format: Vinyl, Digital download	Track list (Vinyl): 3. Kegareta Michi e no Tatakai (穢れた道への闘い)
PelleK	2023/11/01 (Vinyl) 2024/01/17 (Digital)	Muteki no Tabiji	Album details: Label: PelleK; Format: Vinyl, Digital download	Track list (Digital): 1. Kegareta Michi e no Tatakai (穢れた道への闘い)
Autodidactic Studios	2023/12/29	The Last Bakery (Original Animation Soundtrack)	Album details: Label: Autodidactic Studios; Format: Digital download	Track list: 4. Macaron Memories
FLOW	2024/02/21	Flow 20th Anniversary Special Live 2023: Anime Shibari Festival (FLOW 20th ANNIVERSARY SPECIAL LIVE 2023 ～アニメ縛りフェスティバル～ ((初回生産限定盤) - DISC 2)) (First Press Limited Edition: Disc 2)	Album details: Label: Sacra Music (VVXL-183~184); Format: CD; Version: First Press Limited Edition	Track list: 8. Blue Bird feat. Diana Garnet (ブルーバード feat. ダイアナガーネット); 19. Sign feat. Diana Garnet (Sign feat. ダイアナガーネット)
Level Nine	2024/07/06	Beauty, Full Shot (Goddess of Victory: Nikke Original Soundtrack)	Album details: Label: Level Nine; Format: Digital download	Track list: 1. Set Sail (feat. Diana Garnet)
Sound of Windshift	2024/08/03	257 Drops of Rain	Album details: Label: Sound of Windshift; Format: Digital download	Track list: 1. 257 Drops of Rain
Bank of Innovation, Inc.	2024/12/25	MementoMori Lament Collection Vol.2 (English Ver.)	Album details: Label: Bank of Innovation, Inc.; Format: Digital download	Track list: 10. No Name (English Ver.)
Nobuko Toda & Kazuma Jinnouchi	2025/07/10	Leviathan (Soundtrack from the Netflix Series)	Album details: Label: Netflix Music, LLC; Format: Digital download	Track list: 1. The Sky Ahead (その先の空へ, Sono Saki no Sora e) (Joe Hisaishi feat. Diana Garnet)
Milo Poniewozik	2026/02/19	Starlight Re:Volver Original Soundtrack	Album details: Label: Starlight Re:Volver; Format: Digital download	Track list: 22. Revolution; 25. Revolution (Trailer Edit)
Yuki Hayashi	2026/04/22	BGM from TV series "Medalist 2" (TVアニメ『メダリスト』Season 2 オリジナルサウンドトラック)	Album details: Label: KADOKAWA; Formats: CD, Digital download	Track list: 10. Straight to the Top

As Diana Garnett

Artist	Release date	Title	Album details	Track list
Disko Warp	2010/04/07	Anime Love Hardcore	Album details: Label: Disko Warp (DWARP-014); Formats: CD, digital download	Track list: 2. Sobakasu feat. Diana Garnett; 3. Zankoku Na Tenshi No Te-ze feat. Diana Garnett; 7. Grip! feat. Diana Garnett; 10. Moonlight Densetsu feat. Diana Garnett
Disko Warp	2012/04/10	Anime Love Hardcore 2	Album details: Label: Disko Warp (DWARP-037); Formats: CD, digital download	Track list: 1. Lonely in Gorgeous feat. Diana Garnett; 5. Just Communication feat. Diana Garnett; 10. Yuzurenai Negai feat. Diana Garnett

As Ryoko Arahabaki

Artist	Release date	Title	Album details	Track list
Ryoko Arahabaki & Akemi Minamiazabu	2025/10/23	Full Metal Schoolgirl	Album details: Label: Ryoko Arahabaki & Akemi Minamiazabu; Formats: Digital download	Track list: 2. Zenshin Machine Girls; 4. Zenshin Machine Girls (Instrumental)

As Elise

Artist	Release date	Title	Album details	Track list
AstralShift	2023/10/31	Little Goody Two Shoes (Official Game Soundtrack) (Side B)	Album details: Label: AstralShift; Format: Digital download	Track list: 19. Ruby Mirage Slippers; 24. Ruby Mirage Slippers (OFF Vocal)

As Klee

Artist	Release date	Title	Album details	Track list
Autodidactic Studios	2023/04/28	Progenitor: The Shogunate (Original Animation Soundtrack)	Album details: Label: Autodidactic Studios; Format: Digital download	Track list: 9. Klee's Lullaby; 10. Klee's Lullaby (Instrumental Version)

As Raffaella

Artist	Release date	Title	Album details	Track list
V.A.	2024/10/24	Card-en-Ciel Soundtrack (CD 2)	Album details: Label: INTI CREATES (INTIP-031~3); Formats: CD, digital download	Track list: 10. Lamb's Requiem

As Tonkhai

Artist	Release date	Title	Album details	Track list
Alstroemeria Records	2017/12/29	POP CULTURE 7	Album details: Label: Alstroemeria Records (ARCD-0063); Formats: CD, digital download	Track list: 3. Beautiful Crazy feat. Tonkhai (Diana Garnet)

As Lumin Tsukiboshi

Artist	Release date	Title	Album details	Track list
Arbitrary Music	2024/10/27	Traumerei	Album details: Label: Arbitrary Music; Formats: CD	Track list: 3. Cover Story feat. Lumin Tsukiboshi

=== Composing and song-writing ===
As Diana Garnet

Year	Title	Credits	Release (Artist)
2018	Thank you for the Music	Co-Lyricist (Japanese)	Thank you for the Music [ja] (Diana Garnet)
2018	My Life	Co-Lyricist (Japanese)	Thank you for the Music [ja] (Diana Garnet)
2019	Hyperlove Racing	Lyricist (Japanese)	Nippon Marathon (Original Soundtrack) (V.A.)
2019	Hello Again	Co-Lyricist (Japanese)	Hello Again [ja] (Diana Garnet)
2020	What's Igo	Lyricist (English)	Igo no uta [ja] (Diana Garnet)
2023	Genshindou (現振動, Genshindō)	Co-Lyricist (Japanese)	Genshindou (現振動, Genshindō) [ja] (Diana Garnet)
2023	Klee's Lullaby	Lyricist (English), Composer	Progenitor: The Shogunate (Original Animation Soundtrack) (Autodidactic Studios)
2023	Heiwa Sanka (平和賛歌)	Co-Lyricist (Japanese)	Heiwa Sanka [ja] (Diana Garnet) Legend of Chongyue (Original Animation Soundtrack) (Autodidactic Studios)
2023	Macaron Memories	Lyricist (Japanese), Co-Composer	Macaron Memories [ja] (Diana Garnet, Lumin) The Last Bakery (Original Animation Soundtrack) (Autodidactic Studios)
2024	Kagayaku (輝く)	Lyricist (Japanese)	Kagayaku (輝く) [ja] (Diana Garnet)
2024	Sweet Tooth (甘党, Amatō)	Lyricist (Japanese), Co-Composer, Co-Arranger	Sweet Tooth (甘党, Amatō) [ja] (Diana Garnet, Lumin)
2024	Paza Jizambi Bizube	Lyricist (Chaos Language)	Card-en-Ciel Soundtrack (V.A.)
2024	Vondara Vinde	Lyricist (Chaos Language)	Card-en-Ciel Soundtrack (V.A.)
2024	Glory to Me	Lyricist (English)	Card-en-Ciel Soundtrack (V.A.)
2024	Lamb's Requiem	Lyricist (English)	Card-en-Ciel Soundtrack (V.A.)
2024	Floos Florinde	Lyricist (Chaos Language)	Card-en-Ciel Soundtrack (V.A.)
2024	Revolution	Lyricist (Japanese)	Revolution (Diana Garnet)
2025	In Another Story	Lyricist (English)	In Another Story [ja] (Diana Garnet)
2026	Straight to the Top	Lyricist (English)	BGM from TV series "Medalist 2" (TVアニメ『メダリスト』Season 2 オリジナルサウンドトラック) (Yuki Hayashi)
2026	Shining Party	Lyricist (English)	Theme song of video game "WonderPaws"

As Lumin Tsukiboshi

Year	Title	Credits	Release (Artist)
2024	Cover Story	Lyricist (English)	Traumerei (Arbitrary Music)

== Filmography ==
=== Japanese-speaking roles ===
==== Animation ====
List of voice performances in animation
Year	Title	Role	Notes
2019	Meow Meow Japanese History	Taihan, Egawa Hidetatsu, Ishikawa Goemon, etc.	Original
2021	Kūsō Gakuen Pantasia (空想学園パンタシア)	Momo Tomozawa	Original
2024	Kūsō Gakuen Pantasia: Rinkan Gakkō-hen (空想学園パンタシア～林間学校編～)	Momo Tomozawa	Original
2025	Dream Flower Idols	Aika Mujika	Dub
2025	Cash App Asked Us to Make an Anime...	Eltheria	Original

==== Video games ====
List of voice performances in video games
Year	Title	Role	Developer	Type	Notes
2019	Dragon Marked for Death	Amica ※Singing voice cast, also cast in English dub	Inti Creates	Nintendo Switch	Original
2019	Shikhondo: Soul Eater	The Girl ※Also cast in English dub	Deer Farm	Arcade game	Dub
2019	Castlevania: Grimoire of Souls	Dracula's Maid ※Also cast in English dub	Konami	Mobile game	Original
2023	Little Goody Two Shoes	Elise ※Also cast in English dub	Astral Shift Pro	Visual novel	Original
2024	Card-en-Ciel	Raffaela, Rose ※Also cast in English dub	Inti Creates	PC game	Original
2025	Unyielder	Rain	TrueWorld Studios	PC game	Original
2027	Moonlight Pale	Charlotte ※Also cast in English dub	Blue Lily	PC game	Dub
2027	Unmasked Truths: Shattered Dreams	Alice	SuperPROTEIN Studios Inc.	PC game	Dub

==== Drama CD ====
List of voice performances in drama CDs
Year	Title	Role
2016	Yūshi Okajima: Gijinka de manabo! IT Infra no shikumi (擬人化でまなぼ！ITインフラのしくみ)	DBMS

==== Narration ====
List of voice performances in narration
Year	Title	Role	Type	Notes
2023	Bomhat: A Kingdom of Quartz	Blue	Commercial	Original ※Also cast in English dub
2025	Surugaya		Commercial	Original ※Also cast in English dub
2026	Diana Kimpton: Amy Wild, Animal Talker	Amy Wild	Commercial	Original ※Also cast in English dub

=== English-speaking roles ===
==== Animation ====
List of voice performances in anime
Year	Title	Role	Type	Notes
2015	ColorMail	AI	ONA series	Original
2017	Azure Striker Gunvolt	Lumen, Joule	ONA	Dub
2017	Shimajiro and the Rainbow Oasis	Koko	Film	Dub
2018	Shimajiro the Movie: Adventures on Magic Island	Aura	Film	Dub
2019–2023	Shimajiro: A World of Wow!	Kikko Hayashida, Sakurako Koinuma, etc.	ONA series	Dub
2019	Shimajiro and Ururu's Hero Island	Ururu	Film	Dub
2021–2022	Badmood	Sway, etc.	ONA series	Dub
2021–2022	Gudetama Freestyle	N/A	ONA series	Dub
2022	Monsters Wild	Catalina Gato, Komo, etc.	ONA series	Original
2022	Henkei Shoujo	N/A	ONA series	Dub
2022	Bee and PuppyCat: Lazy in Space	TempBot	ONA series	Original
2022	Dooro Bear	Mia, Moon Rabbit	ONA series	Dub
2022	Nameless Road	Dehya	ONA	Original ※MiHoYo Genshin Impact alternate universe
2023	Kuromi's Pretty Journey	N/A	ONA series	Dub
2023–2025	Progenitor	Klee	ONA series	Original ※MiHoYo Genshin Impact alternate universe
2024	Ellen Really Wants Boba	Ellen Joe	ONA	Original ※MiHoYo Zenless Zone Zero alternate universe
2024–2025	Kuromi's Pretty Journey: Escape from the Multiverse!	N/A	ONA series	Dub
2025	Murai in Love	Yuka Nishifuji	TV series	Dub
2025	Makina-san's a Love Bot?!	Cleo Neo Zero	TV series	Dub
2025	Unexpectedly Naughty Fukami	Kana	TV series	Dub
2025	Isekai Onsen Paradise	Mayudama	TV series	Dub
2025	Carlotta vs Cantarella	Carlotta	ONA	Original ※Kuro Games Wuthering Waves alternate universe
2025	Please Trust Me! Genshin Impact Fan Musical	Venti	ONA	Original ※MiHoYo Genshin Impact alternate universe
2025	Bâan: The Boundary of Adulthood	Rin's Mother, Luna, Rin's Friend 1	ONA	Original
2026	Medalist	Manaka Roba	TV series	Dub
2026	Time for a Drink	Endministrator	ONA	Original ※Hypergryph Arknights: Endfield alternate universe
2026	Does it Count if You Lose Your Virginity to an Android?	Ms. Ito, Gal Store Clerk, Girl 2A	TV series	Dub
2026	Kamui: He's Behind You	Shizuka Mimizuka	TV series	Dub
2026	Pacific Impact	Teucer	ONA	Original ※MiHoYo Genshin Impact alternate universe
2026	Hands off: Sawaranaide Kotesashi-kun	Izumi Sumiyoshi	TV series	Dub
TBA	Solomon Shrine	Adrienne Roberts	ONA series	Original

==== Video games ====
List of voice performances in video games
Year	Title	Role	Developer	Type	Notes
2017	AI Eigo: Magna to Fushigi no Shōjo (AIえいご-マグナとふしぎの少女)	Ellie, etc.	Mintflag	Mobile game	Original
2017	Super Bomberman R	Reiko Bomber, Princess Tomato Bomber, Jehuty Bomber	Konami Digital Entertainment	Nintendo Switch	Dub
2018	Tennis	Melissa, Yuan	D3Publisher	Nintendo Switch	Dub
2018	Super Bomberman R	Ayako Katagiri Bomber	Konami Digital Entertainment	Nintendo Switch	Dub
2018	Infinos Exa	System	Picorinne Soft	Arcade game	Original
2018	Super Bomberman R	Nyami Bomber	Konami Digital Entertainment	Nintendo Switch	Dub
2019	Dragon Marked for Death	Amica ※Singing voice cast, also cast in Japanese dub	Inti Creates	Nintendo Switch	Dub
2019	Shikhondo: Soul Eater	The Girl	Deer Farm	Arcade game	Dub
2019	Castlevania: Grimoire of Souls	Maria Renard, Dracula's Maid※ ※Also cast in Japanese dub	Konami	Mobile game	Dub
2019	Omatsuri Quest: Hippare Q (おまつりクエスト ヒッパレQ)	System, etc.	Taito	Arcade game	Original
2020	Caffeine: Victoria's Legacy	Eliza	Kikai Digital	Visual novel	Original
2020	Akyrios Exa	System	Doragon Entertainment	Arcade game	Original
2020	Super Bomberman R Online	Princess Tomato Bomber, Nyami Bomber	Konami Digital Entertainment	Nintendo Switch	Dub
2020	Super Battle Princess Madelyn	Madelyn	Monster Bath Games	Arcade game	Original
2020	Pokémon Mezastar	System	Takara Tomy	Arcade game	Original
2020	Ninjala	Croissant	GungHo Online Entertainment	Nintendo Switch	Dub
2021	Beat Arena	Character	Konami	Oculus Quest	Original
2021	Disney Music Parade	※Singing voice cast	Taito	Mobile game	Original
2021	Rival Megagun XE	Nano Ayesa, Smith	Spacewave Software	Arcade game	Original
2021	Disney Music Parade	※Singing voice cast	Taito	Mobile game	Original
2021	Pikmin Bloom	Navigation	Niantic, Inc.	Mobile game	Original
2022	Dance Around	System, etc.	Konami e-Amusement	Arcade game	Original
2022	Shadow Gangs	Heroine	JKM Corp	Arcade game	Original
2022	Noisz Arc⌖Coda	System	Anarch Entertainment	Arcade game	Original
2022	Azure Striker Gunvolt 3	Lumen, Mytyl	Inti Creates	Nintendo Switch	Dub
2023	Gal Guardians: Demon Purge	Neneko Kosugi, Otome Kurosawa, Kasumi Sakaguchi, Hibari Toba, Yuko Yureino	Inti Creates	Nintendo Switch	Dub
2023	Super Bomberman R 2	Princess Tomato Bomber, Nyami Bomber	Konami Digital Entertainment	Nintendo Switch	Dub
2023	Little Goody Two Shoes	Elise ※Also cast in Japanese dub	Astral Shift Pro	Visual novel	Dub
2024	Omen of Sorrow: Arising Chaos	System	Aone Games	Arcade game	Original
2024	G.I. Joe: Wrath of Cobra	Scarlett	Maple Powered Games	Arcade game	Original
2024	Card-en-Ciel	Lumen, Joule, Raffaela※, Neneko Kosugi, Yuko Yureino, Rose※ ※Also cast in Japanese dub	Inti Creates	PC game	Dub
2025	Neffy: Moonlight Labyrinth	Neffy	TOM CREATE	PC game	Dub
2025	Zenless Zone Zero	Alice Thymefield, Sweety	MiHoYo	PC game	Dub
2025	Strinova	Chiyo	iDreamSky	PC game	Dub
2025	Zenless Zone Zero	Alice Thymefield	MiHoYo	PC game	Dub
2025	Seven Knights: Rebirth	Sera, Rei	Netmarble	PC game	Dub
2025	Neffy: Moonlight Labyrinth X	Neffy	TOM CREATE	PC game	Dub
2025	Full Metal Schoolgirl	Ryoko Arahabaki	D3Publisher	PC game	Dub
2025	Vivid World	Dia, Hong Pao, Kashmir, Ostanes, Bishop	Asobism	PC game	Dub
2025	Inazuma Eleven: Victory Road	Juno Hundertmark, Jazmine Carmine	Level-5	Nintendo Switch	Dub
2026	Opus: Prism Peak	Ren	SIGONO	PC game	Dub
2026	Hell Maiden	Dante Alighieri, Queen Minos	Astral Shift Pro	PC game	Original
2026	Eternal Return	Lucia	Nimble Neuron	PC game	Dub
2026	Burn With Me	Erra	Nozomu Games	PC game	Original
2026	Kernel Hearts	Spika, Toke	Ephemera Games	PC game	Dub
2027	Moonlight Pale	Charlotte ※Also cast in Japanese dub	Blue Lily	PC game	Original
TBA	Runic: Eternal Sunrise	The Mortal	Drunk Robot Games	PC game	Original
TBA	The Heart of Gold	Amarillis	J3F33M1	PC game	Original
TBA	Clover	Ichiko Lucine	ClovexHeavenix	PC game	Original
TBA	School Days Remastered	Itaru Itō	JAST USA	PC game	Dub

==== Film ====
List of voice performances in film
Year	Title	Role	Notes
2019	Prison 13 (プリズン13)	Sophia	Original
2025	Shogun's Ninja (SHOGUN’S NINJA-将軍乃忍者-)	Kagaribi	Dubbing

==== Narration ====
List of voice performances in narration
Year	Title	Role	Type	Notes
2017	Anime Supernova	—	TV series	Original
2017	The Kimono Awards 2017	—	Opening narration	Live event
2019	Atsuhide Tanaka: Chūgaku 3-nenkan no Bunpō, Tango, Hatsuon ga 1-satsu de Mi ni tsuku: Eigo Phrase 101 (学3年間の文法・単語・発音が1冊で身につく 英語フレーズ101)	—	Textbook	—
2019	Songs of Tokyo Festival 2019 (SONGS OF TOKYO フェスティバル 2019)	—	—	Live event
2020	Seishi Satō: Chūgaku 3-nenkan no Eigo ga Chū-2-byō Phrase nara 1-shūkan de Manaberu nante watashi wa Shinjinai (中学3年間の英語が中2病フレーズなら1週間で学べるなんてわたしは信じない)	—	Textbook	—
2020	Garo: Versus Road	—	TV series	Original
2020	Upopoy: National Ainu Museum and Park (ウポポイ 民族共生象徴空間 国立アイヌ民族博物館)	—	Museum	Audio guide
2020	Nep League (ネプリーグ)	—	TV series	—
2020	Songs of Tokyo Festival 2020 (SONGS OF TOKYO フェスティバル 2020)	—	—	Live event
2022	Promotion movie Live2D Creator edition: English ver. A & B	—	Commercial	Dub
2022	Final Fantasy Brave Exvius: Wylk and Paladin Sylvie	Paladin Sylvie	Commercial	Dub
2022	Savor Japan	—	TV series	Original
2022	100 second Fairytales	—	TV series	Original
2023	A Kingdom of Quartz	Blue	Commercial	Dub ※Also cast in Japanese dub
2023	VR Geisha Games	—	Commercial	Dub
2024	Island of Kozu (まるっと神津島)	Maki Sugashi	Mobile app	Audio guide
2025	Surugaya		Commercial	Dub ※Also cast in Japanese dub
2026	Diana Kimpton: Amy Wild, Animal Talker	Amy Wild	Commercial	Dub ※Also cast in Japanese dub
2026	Game-Genome	—	TV series	Original
2026	Asura's Verdict: He can send people to hell…	Karin (Raika's mother)	Commercial	Dub

== Staff positions ==
=== Animation ===
As Diana Garnet

List of staff positions in animation
Year	Title	Staff position	Notes
2019	BEM	Setting English translation assistant	TV series
2023–2025	Progenitor	Casting assistance	MiHoYo Genshin Impact alternate universe ONA series
2023	Legend of Chongyue	Casting assistance	Yostar Arknights alternate universe ONA
2023	Cyber Fontaine: The Last Bakery	Casting assistance	MiHoYo Genshin Impact alternate universe ONA
2024	Ellen Really Wants Boba	Casting assistance	MiHoYo Zenless Zone Zero alternate universe ONA
2024	Sunset	ADR director (Character "Wanjiru")	MiHoYo Genshin Impact ONA
2025	Carlotta vs Cantarella	Casting assistance	Kuro Games Wuthering Waves alternate universe ONA
2025	Soul Mart	Casting assistance	ONA series
2025	Please Trust Me! Genshin Impact Fan Musical	Casting assistance, ADR director, Localization	MiHoYo Genshin Impact alternate universe ONA
2025	Bâan: The Boundary of Adulthood	English localization producer, Assistant ADR director	ONA
2025	Cash App Asked Us to Make an Anime...	Casting assistance	ONA
2026	Dialyn Really Wants that Dumpling	Casting assistance	MiHoYo Zenless Zone Zero alternate universe ONA
2026	Time for a Drink	Casting assistance	Hypergryph Arknights: Endfield alternate universe ONA
2026	Too Many Void Hunters	Casting assistance	MiHoYo Zenless Zone Zero alternate universe ONA
2026	Boba Gives You Wings	Casting assistance	MiHoYo Zenless Zone Zero alternate universe ONA
2026	Pacific Impact	Casting assistance	MiHoYo Genshin Impact alternate universe ONA
2026	Ninja Skooler	Theme song lyrics translation	Pilot

=== Video games ===
List of staff positions in video games
Year	Title	Developer	Type	Staff position	Notes
2019	Shikhondo: Soul Eater	Deer Farm	Arcade game	Casting assistance, ADR director	Japanese & English dub
2020	Genshin Impact	MiHoYo	PC game	ADR director (Additional voices)	English dub
2021	Rival Megagun XE	Spacewave Software	Arcade game	Casting assistance, ADR director	English dub
2022	Gunvolt Chronicles: Luminous Avenger iX 2	Inti Creates	PlayStation 4	Casting assistance, ADR director	English dub
2022	Azure Striker Gunvolt 3	Inti Creates	Nintendo Switch	Casting assistance, ADR director	English dub
2023	Gal Guardians: Demon Purge	Inti Creates	Nintendo Switch	Casting assistance, ADR director	English dub
2023	Brawlhalla	Blue Mammoth Games	PC game	Localization, ADR director	Japanese dub
2023	Little Goody Two Shoes	Astral Shift Pro	Visual novel	Casting assistance, ADR director	Original English & Japanese dub
2024	PuzzMiX	Inti Creates	PC game	Casting assistance, ADR director	English dub
2024	Shikhondo: Youkai Rampage	Deer Farm	PC game	Casting assistance, ADR director	Japanese & English dub
2024	Umbraclaw	Inti Creates	Nintendo Switch	Casting assistance, ADR director	English dub
2024	Zenless Zone Zero	MiHoYo	PC game	ADR director (Additional voices)	English dub
2024	Card-en-Ciel	Inti Creates	Nintendo Switch	Casting assistance, ADR director	English dub
2024	Divine Dynamo Flamefrit	Inti Creates	Nintendo Switch	Casting assistance, ADR director	English dub
2025	Unyielder	TrueWorld Studios	PC game	Casting assistance	English dub
2026	Hell Maiden	Astral Shift Pro	PC game	Casting assistance, ADR director	English dub
2026	Kernel Hearts	Ephemera Games	PC game	Casting assistance, ADR director	English dub

=== Film ===
List of staff positions in film
Year	Title	Staff position	Notes
2025	Shogun's Ninja	ADR director	English dub

=== Commercials ===
List of staff positions in commercials
Year	Title	Developer	Type	Staff position	Notes
2024	Divine Dynamo Flamefrit	Inti Creates	Nintendo Switch	Casting assistance, Voice director	English dub
2026	Diana Kimpton: Amy Wild, Animal Talker	—		Casting assistance, Voice director	Japanese & English dub

=== Literature ===
==== Manga ====
List of staff positions in manga
Year	Title	Publisher	Publication	Staff position	Art
2023	Miku's NY Broadway Diary	NHK Publishing	NHK: Radio Chūgakusei no Kiso Eigo (ラジオ中学生の基礎英語 レベル1)	Story	Nobiru
