= Colt Lyerla =

American football player and rugby league footballer (born 1992)

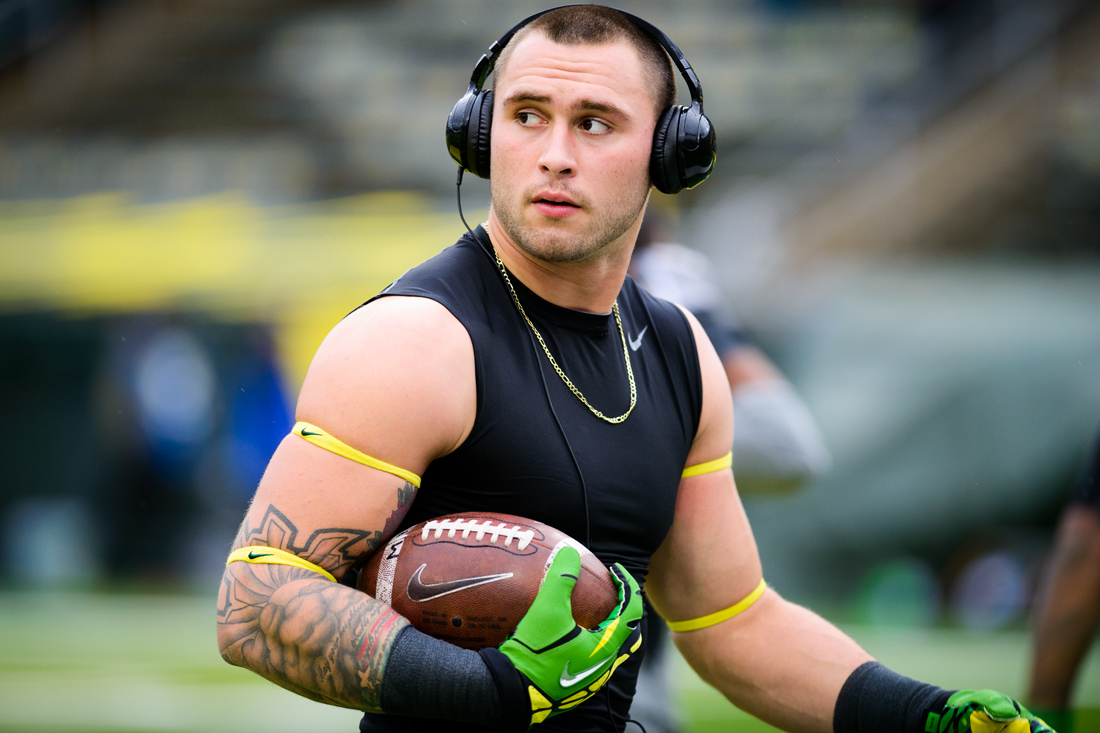
- Lyerla in 2013

No. 2
- Position: Tight end

Personal information
- Born: November 13, 1992 (age 33); Hillsboro, Oregon, U.S.
- Listed height: 6 ft 4 in (1.93 m)
- Listed weight: 242 lb (110 kg)

Career information
- High school: Hillsboro (OR)
- College: Oregon
- NFL draft: 2014: undrafted

Career history
- Green Bay Packers (2014)*; Arizona Rattlers (2016)*; Portland Steel (2016)
- * Offseason or practice squad member only

Career AFL statistics
- Receptions: 2
- Receiving yards: 8
- Receiving touchdowns: 1
- Total tackles: 1.5
- Stats at ArenaFan.com
- Stats at Pro Football Reference

Colt Keliikoa Lyerla (born November 13, 1992) is an American former football wide receiver. He played tight end at the University of Oregon for the Ducks but left in October 2013 for personal reasons. He signed with the Green Bay Packers after going undrafted during the 2014 NFL draft. He was a member of the Arizona Rattlers and Portland Steel of the Arena Football League. He also played for AS Carcassonne in the Elite One Championship rugby league.

== Early life ==
Lyerla was born in Hillsboro, Oregon, on November 13, 1992, to Roger and Tammy Lyerla, with the family later moving to Hawaii and then Vancouver, Washington. His parents divorced in 2001, and he moved to Gladstone, Oregon, before moving back to Hillsboro in 2003. In Hillsboro, he attended Hillsboro High School, where he played both football and basketball for the Spartans. On the football team he played both ways as a running back on offense and linebacker on defense, winning a state championship in 2009. That season, he was named as The Oregonian's top offensive player at the 5A classification after he ran for 1,543 yards with 26 touchdowns, along with 843 yards and 13 touchdowns receiving as a junior.

During the 2009 season he caught a 61-yard Hail Mary pass at the end of the game against rival Glencoe High School to win the game; the play made ESPN's SportsCenter as the play of the week. The next year as a senior, he rushed for 1,519 yards on 133 carries and was selected as a first-team all-state selection by The Oregonian as a running back, and second-team as a linebacker. Lyerla was recruited by teams such as the Southern California Trojans, the California Bears, the Miami Hurricanes, the Nebraska Cornhuskers, the Oklahoma Sooners, and the Texas Longhorns, but committed to the University of Oregon while at the 2011 U.S. Army All-American Bowl. Lyerla had garnered recruiting attention prior to his junior year after performing well during summer recruiting camps, and had offers from over 30 schools before making his commitment.

== College career ==
Lyerla graduated early from high school and enrolled at Oregon in the spring of 2011 so he could take part in spring practices. During the team's spring game he had three catches for 37 yards while playing tight end. As a true freshman for the 2011 season, he played tight end and caught 7 passes for 147 yards and 5 touchdowns.

For the 2012 season, Lyerla earned the starting tight end position, and part-way into the season also saw playing time at the running back position. Lyerla finished the season with 25 receptions for 392 yards and 6 touchdowns, and also rushed for 77 yards and 1 touchdown.

During the 2013 season Lyerla missed a game against Tennessee and was then suspended for the game against Colorado before quitting the team on October 6, 2013. He ended the season with 3 runs for 17 yards, including a touchdown, and 2 receptions for 26 yards in two games.

== Professional career ==
=== National Football League ===
Lyerla went undrafted in the 2014 NFL draft. He was signed by the Green Bay Packers on May 19, 2014, as an undrafted free agent. On August 2, 2014, at the Packers annual Family Night practice Lyerla tore the posterior cruciate ligament and medial collateral ligament in his right knee when trying to hurdle a defender during a non-contact practice. Initially placed on the Packers injured reserve list, Lyerla was waived with an injury settlement on August 26, 2014, that paid him through Week 8 of the season.

=== Arena Football League ===
On November 5, 2015, Lyerla signed with the Arizona Rattlers of the Arena Football League for the 2016 Arena Football League season. On March 11, 2016, Lyerla was traded to the Portland Steel for Jordan Mudge.

== Controversies ==
In March 2013, Lyerla tweeted in support of a conspiracy theory that the Sandy Hook Elementary School shooting was part of a government conspiracy to advance gun control policies. The tweet was denounced by the University of Oregon as "insensitive and offensive." Lyerla later apologized.

After leaving the Oregon Ducks during the 2013 season, Lyerla was arrested and later pleaded guilty to the unlawful possession of cocaine.

Lyerla was arrested on Saturday, September 6, 2014, at 2:52 a.m. for driving under the influence (DUI). The DUI was for impairment not related to alcohol. On August 28, 2016, Lyerla was arrested in Tigard, Oregon, for possession of heroin. He pleaded guilty to first- and second-degree forgery, and was sentenced to six months in prison. Lyerla escaped custody on May 5, 2017.

Lyerla was sentenced on November 19, 2019, to 27 months in the Oregon State Penitentiary after pleading guilty to charges of coercion, fourth-degree assault, unlawful possession of heroin and strangulation in Lane County Circuit Court.
