= Hillsboro High School (Oregon) =

Public school in Oregon, United States

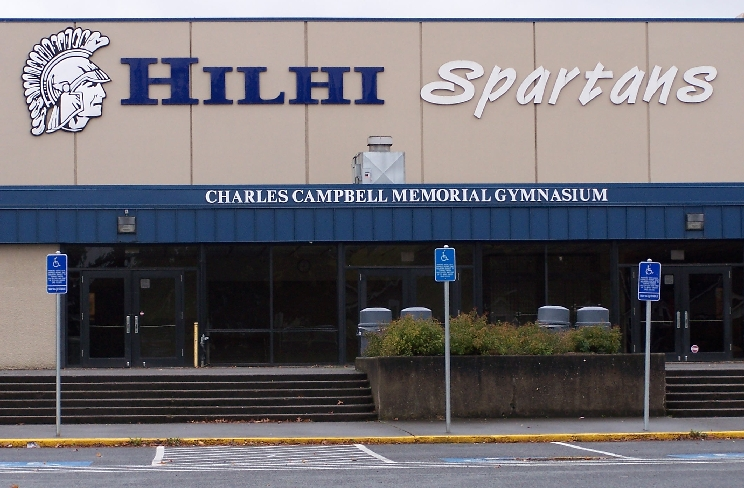

Location
- 3285 SE Rood Bridge Road; Hillsboro, Oregon 97123; United States; 45.494917°N 122.958984°W

Information
- School type: Public, high school
- Motto: "Be Think Live Blue"
- Opened: 1913 (current campus completed in 1969)
- School district: Hillsboro School District 1J
- Principal: Cary Meier
- Staff: 70.49 (FTE)
- Grades: 9–12
- Enrollment: 1,343 (2023–2024)
- Student to teacher ratio: 19.05
- Language: English
- Campus: Suburban
- Colors: Royal blue, white, and scarlet
- Team name: Spartans
- Rival: Glencoe High School
- Feeder schools: South Meadows Middle School
- Website: https://hilhi.hsd.k12.or.us/

Hillsboro High School (HHS, colloquially Hilhi) is a public high school in Hillsboro, Oregon, United States, and is the oldest high school in the Hillsboro School District. It is also the smallest high school in the district.

== History ==
In September 1908, tenth grade was added to the Hillsboro school district, with classes held on the top floor of the school. Eleventh and twelfth grades were soon added, and in June 1911 the first students to complete four years of high school graduated. This class totaled five students, consisting of four girls and one boy. In September 1911, the school added manual training and domestic science courses to the curriculum. That same year, voters approved of a $50,000 bond measure to pay for constructing a high school building, with construction completed in 1913 at a cost of $40,000 for the three-story building. In 1913, the school graduated eight students. A gymnasium was built beginning in 1915. The school grew in size, with the 1920 graduating class totally 36 students, the largest number up to that time. As early as the 1910s, "Hilhi" was used as a colloquial name for the school; the 1917 annual yearbook featured the title "The Hilhi" on its cover.

In 1929, a new high school building was completed, with additional buildings and the wings added in later years. Located near downtown Hillsboro, at NE Sixth Avenue and Lincoln Street, the site became a mid-high once the current campus was built beginning in 1969. In 1970, the new senior high school campus opened on 48 acres (190,000 m^{2}) on the south side of Hillsboro, with enrollment of the high school district reaching 3,621 students that year. Students complained that the new layout that consisted of classrooms spread out over the campus instead of a single central building was a poor choice for Oregon’s rainy and cold winters.

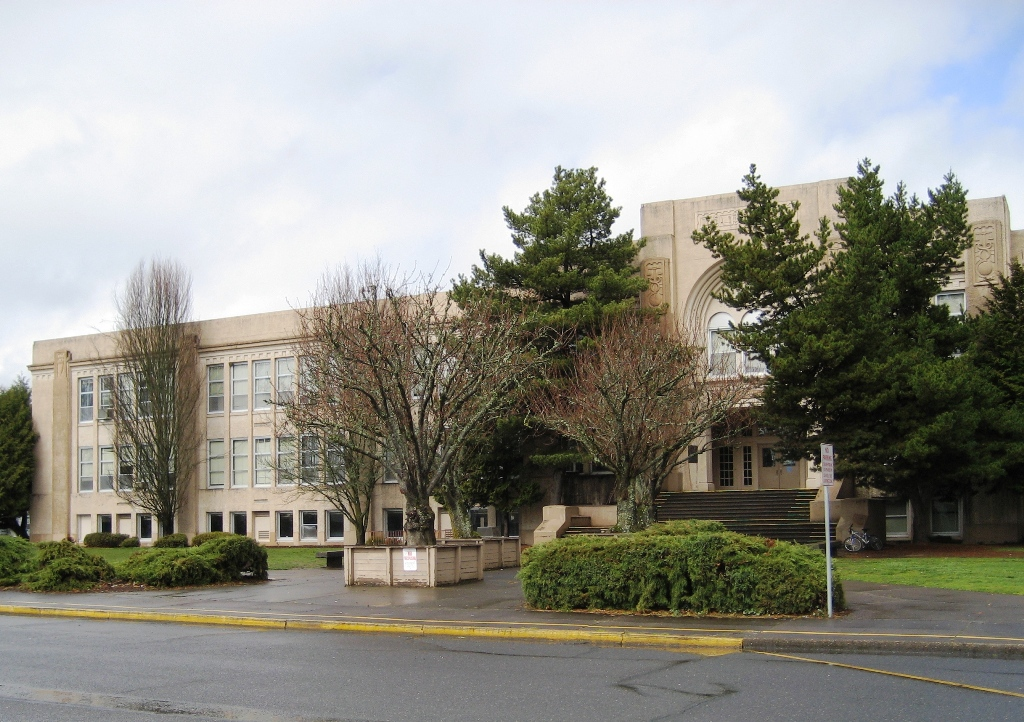
The former campus served as Thomas Jr. High/Middle School from 1969 until it was demolished in 2009.

The school has been remodeled several times since opening in 1969. The first time was around 1980, when some minor updates such as the covered walkways were added. During the summer of 1999 the school received further updates. Blue and beige paint replaced the old brown colors on the buildings, the commons area was built adjacent to the cafeteria, a new auditorium was constructed, a new building was built to house technology related classes, and the main office was remodeled. After the expansion Hilhi had a total of 256,652 square feet (23,843.8 m^{2}) of space spread out among eleven single-story buildings on campus. During the summer of 2008 the locker rooms were remodeled, improving the lighting, showers, and bathrooms. Future plans included the replacement of aging HVAC units and controls by 2011.

In 2003, the school, along with all schools in the district, made national news when 17 days of classes were cut from the school year, which allowed students to begin summer break in May, due to budget cuts to education in Oregon.

Teacher Don Domes won the Software Association of Oregon Foundation's Oregon Technology Educator of Year in 2004.

Since 2006 the school has participated in the MIT-Lemelson InvenTeam program. Through the program, the school has received a $10,000 grant for a team of students to invent a self-installable heads-up display for automotive use and a $4,000 grant to invent an industrial sized robotic vacuum/floor cleaning system.

The former campus near downtown was demolished in 2009.

In the fall of 2015, the school became the first in the district to implement a mariachi band program into the curriculum, started by Hilhi alumni and Choir Director, Benjamin Noyes.

== Academics ==
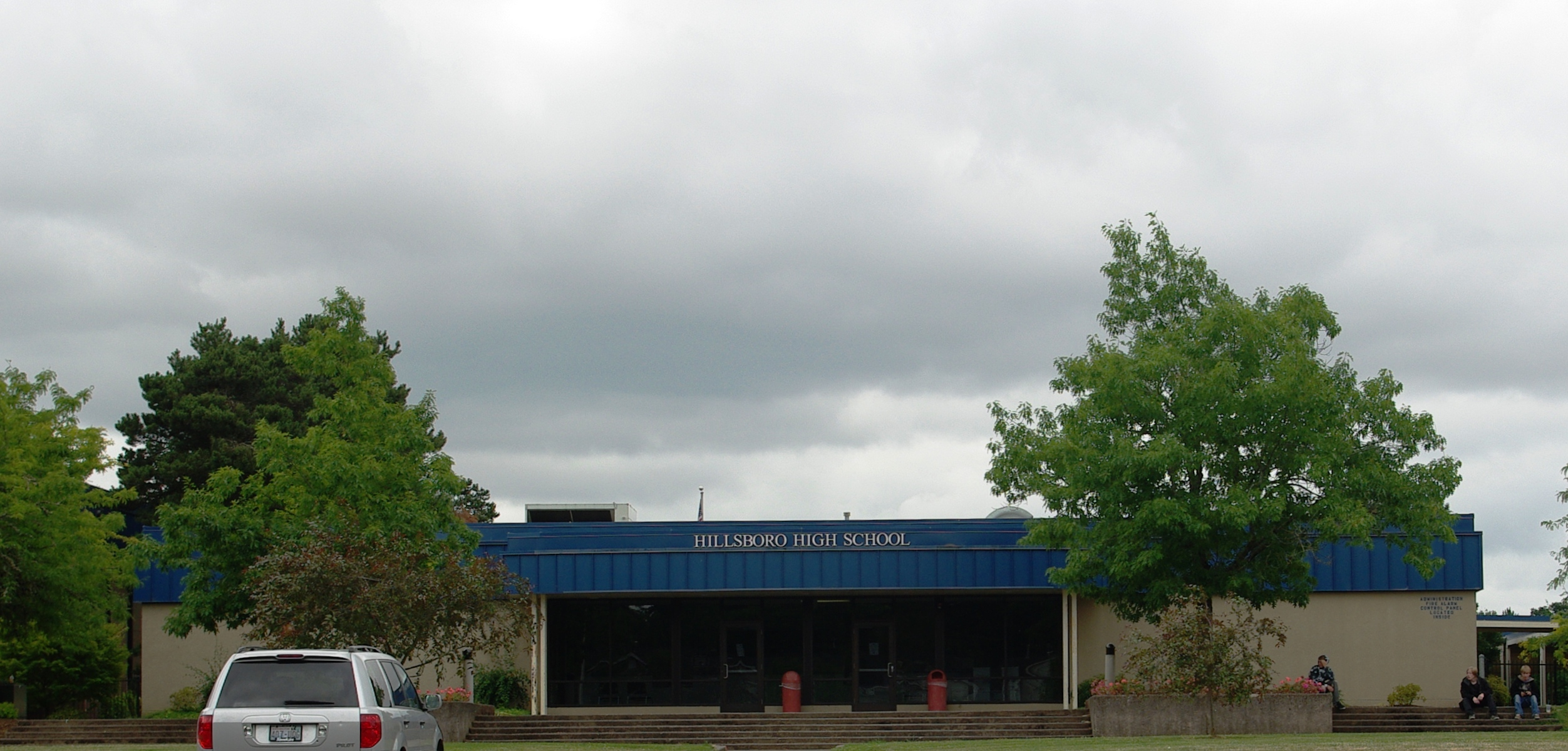
Administration building

Hillsboro High School has offered the International Baccalaureate Diploma Programme since 2003, and in 2009, began offering the Middle Years Programme. The school also has an ASPIRE program and a robotics team.

2004–2005 SAT scores
Category	HHS	State	Country
Critical Reading	519	523	503
Math	528	529	518
Writing	496	503	497
Percentage tested	46%	55%	NA

In 2008, 80% of the school's seniors received a high school diploma. Of 364 students, 293 graduated, 39 dropped out, three received a modified diploma, and 29 were still in high school in 2009.

The school's 2020–21 graduation rate was 90%.

== Athletics ==
Hilhi, known as the Spartans, competes in the Northwest Oregon Conference at the OSAA class 5A level. School colors are royal blue and white, and the athletic director is Steve Drake.

Cross-town school Glencoe has been Hilhi's arch-rival since Glencoe became the second high school in the district in 1980. The football rivalry was featured on the Great American Rivalries series in October 2007. Teams play for bragging rights at the shared Hare Field. The 2009 game featured a 61-yard Hail Mary pass at the end of the game caught by Colt Lyerla for a touchdown after time expired to give Hilhi the victory. The play was named as ESPN's top play of the day and of the week. That season the team finished ranked number one in their classification and won the state title, the first in football since 1973.

Mouse Davis, an early proponent of the run and shoot offense, coached Hillsboro High to the 1973 football state championship. Oregon Sports Hall of Fame coach Ad Rutschman coached the baseball team from 1955 to 1968 before moving on to Linfield College. Rutschman also led the Spartans to a state championship in football in 1966 with a 17–2 victory over South Salem.

Since 1965, the school has used Hare Field for football, baseball, and track.

=== OSAA State Championships ===
==== Team titles ====
- Wrestling: 1952, 1990
- Baseball: 1962 (tie), 1966, 1968, 1993
- Cheer: 1993
- Dance: 1998
- Football: 1966, 1973, 2009
- Girls' basketball: 1979, 1980
- Girls' cross-country: 1979
- Boys' soccer: 2006
- Boys' swimming: 2017

== Student life ==
The school previously held a homecoming king and queen ceremony, but this was terminated by the student government in 2016. Beth Graser, the chief of communications of the school district, stated that the move was made to prevent a popularity contest from occurring, while the class president of the 12th grade and the student government adviser stated it was done to make student culture more inclusive for genderqueer individuals.

== Notable alumni ==
- Bob Beall, baseball player
- Scott Brow, baseball pitcher
- Rick Dancer, television anchor and politician
- David Edwards, politician
- Thomas Garrigus, Olympic athlete
- Tom Hughes, politician
- Josh Inman, Olympic athlete
- Bill Kellar, football player
- David Larsen, actor
- Colt Lyerla, football player
- Tiffeny Milbrett, Olympic soccer player
- Ad Rutschman, football/baseball coach
- Wes Schulmerich, baseball player
- Bruce Starr, politician
- Bryce Zabel, television producer

== See also ==
- Rood Bridge Park
