= Nicholas Edwards (singer) =

- ニコラス・エドワーズ
- Born: July 31, 1992 (age 34); Hillsboro, Oregon, U.S
- Other name: Nyk
- Education: Glencoe High School
- Occupations: Singer; actor
- Years active: 2011–present
- Agent: Lohas Productions
- Height: 186 cm (6 ft 1 in)
- Musical career
- Origin: Japan
- Genres: J-Pop
- Instrument: Vocals
- Label: Warner Music Japan
- Website: nicholas-edwards.com//

Nicholas "Nyk" Edwards (ニコラス・エドワーズ, Nikorasu Edowāzu; born July 31, 1992) is an American singer and actor from Hillsboro, Oregon. He is the winner of the October 11th, 2011 and October 7, 2012 broadcasts of the Japanese singing competition Nodojiman The World.

== Career ==
=== Early life and beginnings ===
Edwards was born in Hillsboro, Oregon and raised in the neighboring city of Cornelius. He is the first son of his household, and has one younger brother. Edwards' father was the vocalist and guitarist of a local band, and Edwards credits him for having sparked his interest in music at a young age. Edwards attended McKinney Elementary School and Evergreen Middle School. Edwards began studying the Japanese language at the age of 14 upon entering high school, and soon found himself infatuated, completing the four-year course by the end of his Sophomore year. He graduated from Glencoe High School in Hillsboro. In the summer of 2008, Edwards visited Japan for the first time, spending roughly 2 months in Fukuroi, Shizuoka, sister city to his native Hillsboro, and the Tokyo area. He participated in the Japanese speech contest sponsored by the Portland consulate general in 2008 and 2010 where he placed 2nd and 1st respectively. Upon graduating in June 2010, Edwards moved to Tokyo, Japan to pursue his dream of becoming a Japanese pop singer.

=== Arrival in Japan and initial recognition ===
Edwards made his debut on Japanese television in June 2011, participating in the first installment of the singing competition "Nodojiman The World." Since then, he has appeared on various television programs both as a singer and actor. He is the only performer to have appeared on every broadcast of "Nodojiman The World," and the only contestant to have won twice. In early 2012, Edwards starred in the musical comedy "Hinomaru Dream," which was filmed as an entry work in the 4th annual Okinawa International Film Festival. The film was based loosely on Edwards' life, and plays on the comical situations he was placed in while chasing his dream of stardom in Japan. The film was released to theaters nationwide in the spring of 2013.

=== Major debut and release of "Skies" ===
Edwards' first musical release was the indie EP 'n/f,' containing 5 cover songs and 2 original works, totaling 7 tracks. Edwards embarked on a promotional tour in March 2013 to commemorate its release, where he announced his signing with Warner Music Japan and plans to release his debut single on his 21st birthday, July 31, 2013.

Edwards' debut single under Warner Music Japan was entitled "F Ga Uta Ni Naru" and was released as a box set containing both the single CD and a DVD with documentary footage of a trip to his hometown of Portland, Oregon earlier in the year.

"F Ga Uta Ni Naru" was the first and only single released off of Edwards' first album "Skies," which hit stores October 6, 2013. "Skies" was released as a double mini-album featuring disc "Sky," a compilation of 5 original songs, three penned by Edwards himself, and disc "Earth," covers of 6 traditional Japanese folk songs. The title track, "Skies," was later used in a commercial for the university prep school Masuda-juku (増田塾), airing for the first half of 2014.

Edwards also appeared in and sang the jingle to the commercial for a Lotte brand throat lozenge beginning in October, 2013.
