= Nodojiman The World =

- Also known as: Song for Japan
- Genre: Music show
- Starring: Masahiro Nakai; Yukari Nishio
- Country of origin: Japan
- Original language: Japanese
- No. of episodes: 19

Production
- Executive producer: Masataka Endo
- Production location: Maihama Amphitheater (Chiba)
- Camera setup: Multiple
- Running time: 60 or 120 minutes (with commercials)

Original release
- Network: Nippon Television
- Release: June 25, 2011

Nodojiman The World (のどじまんTHEワールド!), often referred to simply as Nodojiman The World: Song for Japan, Sekai ga Utau Nippon no Meikyoku Senshuken, is a Japanese music television program hosted by duo Masahiro Nakai from Smap and Yukari Nishio and by convention chairman Terry Ito. Debuted on June 25, 2011, it is produced by Nihon TV and airs on Nihon TV twice a year from 19:00 p.m. to 21:54 p.m. (JST).

== Overview ==
The main point of the music show is to give people, passionate about Japan, from all over the world and the opportunity to perform the most famous Japanese pop songs on the television stage.

By selective recordings and auditions, only best 12 contestants are always selected and invited to the program.

The singing contest is divided into two parts, in the first part all contestants are introduced in 2 versus teams from different country, the one who get the highest points will pass on the next second part where among of 6 best singers will be decided the final winner.

Voting committee consists of three members who are in Japanese music industry for over two decades such as Tsunku, Tetsuya Komuro or Nanase Aikawa. Based on impression of performance they give together the contestant the highest points. During first year of broadcast winners were only given one prize. However, since 2012 after Masahiro has become a regular host of the program, there is given one more special prize named Song in Japan, which makes totally 2 winners.

Its original version NHK Nodo Jiman holds the Guinness World Record as the longest-running TV music talent show.

The jury was to distribute a total of 400 points for a performance. The first contestant to receive the full count of 400 points was Todd Spitz on 24 December 2013. Some of the past contestants were successful enough to caught attention to some of Japanese music companies and made their dreams come true by debuting in Japan as a singer such as a Chris Hart, Nicholas Edwards or Diana Garnet.

== History ==
The first episode of Nodojiman was broadcast by TBS television channel on 25 June 2011, hosted by Sachiko Furuichi and Ryou Kawamura.

The second episode was broadcast four months later, on 11 October 2011 and was moved to Nippon TV, hosted by Yukari Nishiro and Masato.

In 2012 Masato was changed and replaced by Masahiro Nakai. Since then this hosting duo with Yukari are both active as of 2018 broadcasts.

In years 2012 and 2013 there were three broadcasts during year, from 2014 it has been officially decided into twice year broadcasts.

Until March 2014 all episodes were recorded inside NTV studio, since October 2014 the shows are recorded in the Maihama Amphitheater.

The broadcast days and times aren't always same, in years 2015-2016 the broadcast aired on Wednesdays and since 2017 until the present the broadcast is scheduled on Saturdays in evening JST. The broadcast schedule last sometimes one or two hours.

== Episodes ==
Year	Broadcast date	Broadcast day	Broadcast time
2011	June 25	Sunday	13:30 - 14:30
2011	October 11	Tuesday	22:00 - 23:30
2012	March 9	Friday	19:00 - 20:50
2012	July 15	Sunday	19:00 - 21:50
2012	December 24	Monday	19:00 - 20:54
2013	April 6	Sunday	19:00 - 21:54
2013	October 5	Saturday	19:00 - 20:54
2013	December 24	Tuesday	18:45 - 21:00
2014	March 22	Saturday	19:00 - 21:54
2014	October 4	Saturday	19:00 - 20:54
2015	March 11	Wednesday	19:00 - 21:54
2015	September 30	Wednesday	19:00 - 20:54
2016	March 9	Wednesday	19:56 - 21:54
2016	October 26	Wednesday	19:56 - 21:54
2017	May 13	Saturday	19:00 - 20:54
2017	November 25	Saturday	19:00 - 21:54
2018	March 10	Saturday	19:00 - 21:54
2018	October 20	Saturday	19:00 - 20:54
