= Rood Bridge Park =

Public park in Hillsboro, Oregon, US

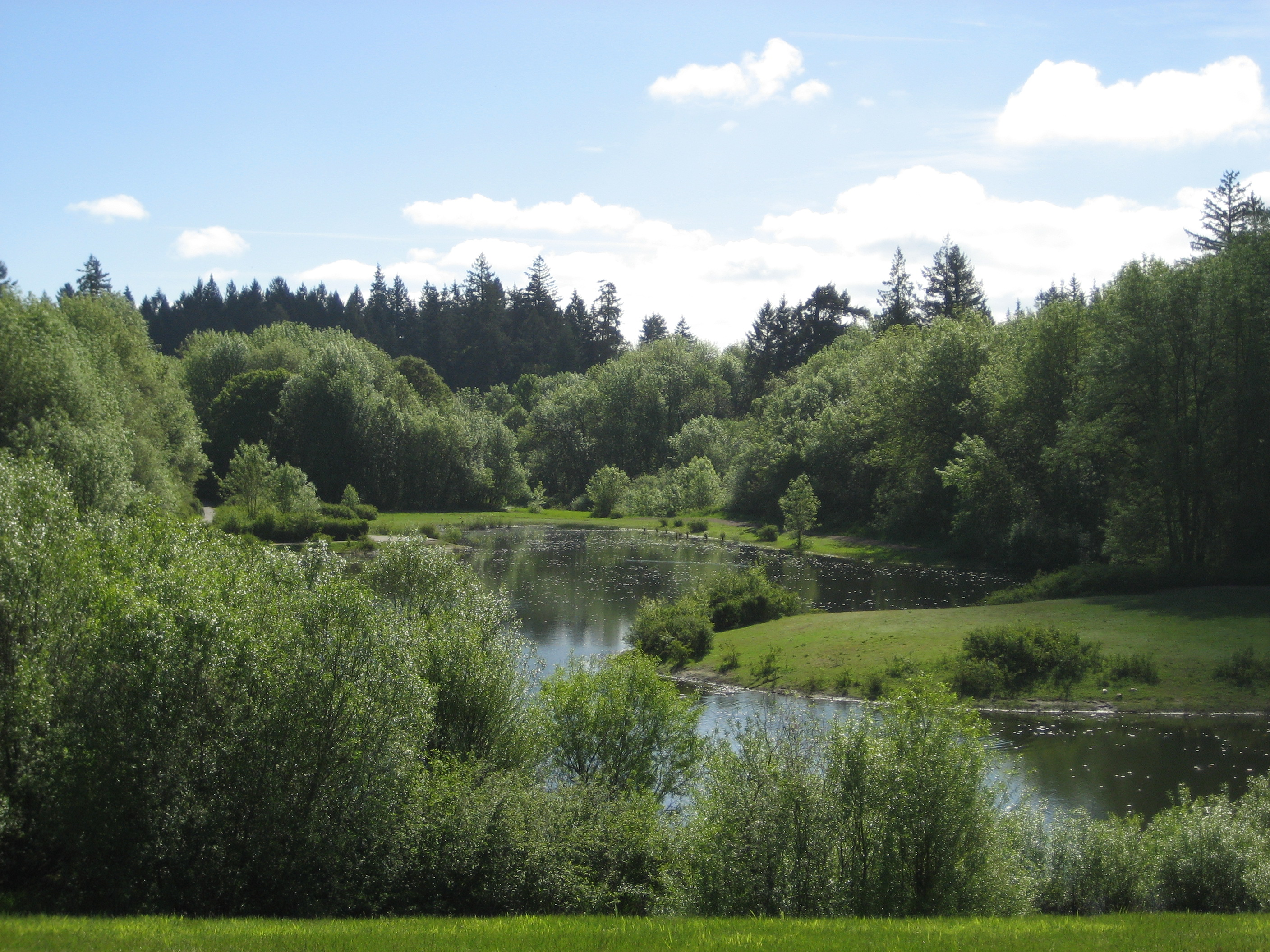
- Pond at the park
- Interactive map of Rood Bridge Park
- Type: Public, city
- Location: Hillsboro, Oregon; United States
- Coordinates: 45°29′30″N 122°57′05″W
- Area: 60 acres (24 ha)
- Created: 1999
- Operator: Hillsboro Parks & Recreation Department
- Status: open
- Website: Rood Bridge Park

Rood Bridge Park is a municipal park in southeast Hillsboro, Oregon, United States. Opened in 1999, the park encompasses 60 acres (24 ha) on the north bank of the Tualatin River at its confluence with Rock Creek. Rood Bridge is near Hillsboro High School and sits across the river from Meriwether National Golf Course. The park is the city's largest, and contains tennis courts, a meeting facility, trails, a canoe launch, and a rhododendron garden among other features.

== History ==
In 1992, the city bought 35 acres (14 ha) from the Dreiling family to begin assembly property for a park in southeast Hillsboro. The family had lived on the land in excess of 40 years before selling. An additional 25 acres (100,000 m^{2}) was added from the nearby wastewater plant and from floodplain along Rock Creek and the Tualatin River. Hillsboro received almost $990,000 in funds from Metro in 1995 as its allocation of funds from a regional bond measure that paid for increasing greenspaces in the Portland metropolitan area. Part of these funds were designated for developing a park along the Tualatin River.

Flooding in February 1996 fell around 100 trees on the property and added other debris. In 1997, SOLV and Intel helped clear some of the debris at the park site. In May 1997, the city hired a contractor to build a boat launch for small craft, trails, and a parking lot at a cost of $771,000. Later that year volunteers from SOLV planted trees and other plants at the park site. In February 1998, the city worked with the Rotary Club to plan and pay for a building at the park to be used as meeting space. The $275,000 building was built beginning in the Spring of that year.

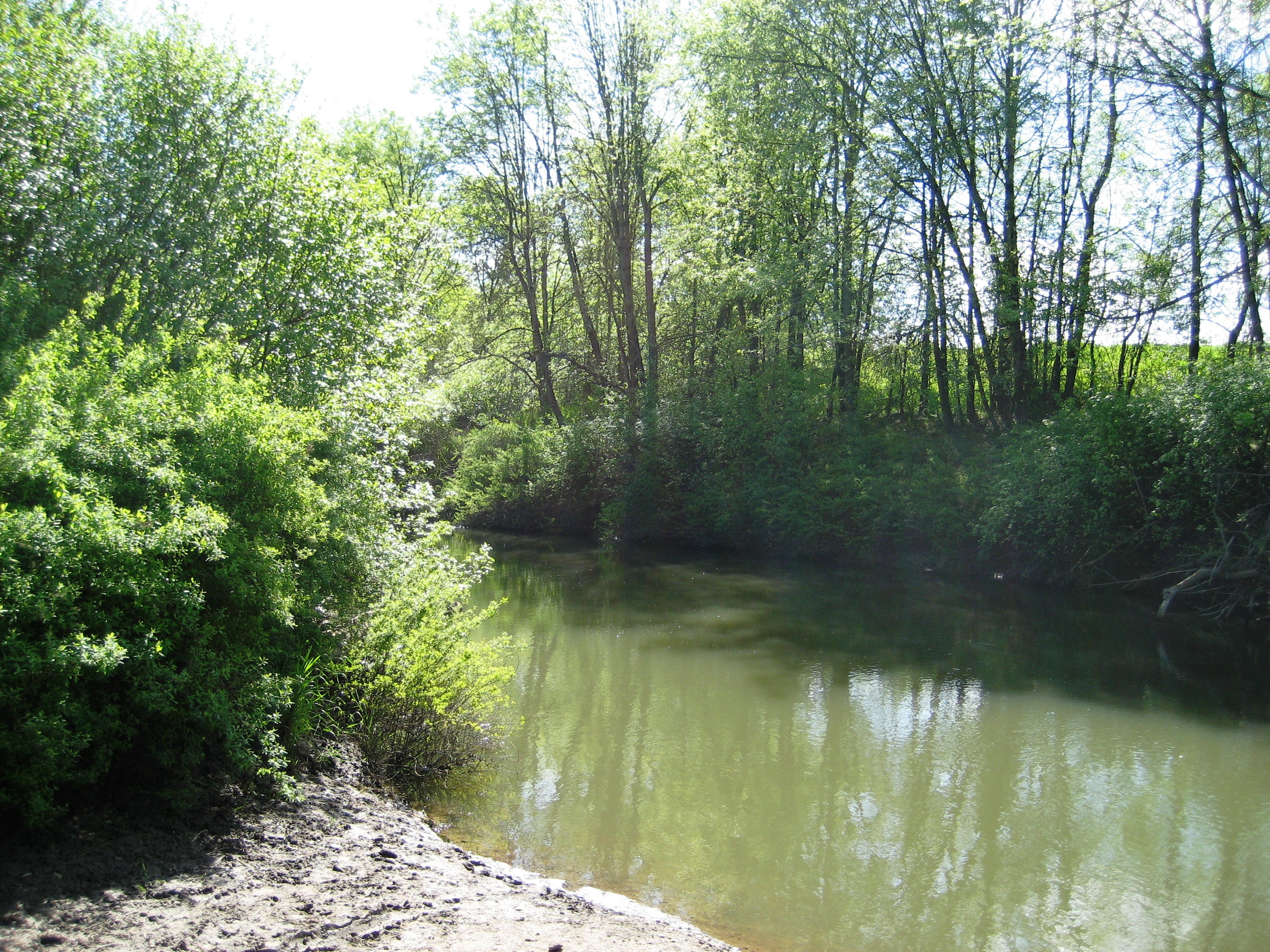
The Tualatin River at the park

During construction of the park there were problems with the contractor CEMS Inc., with lawsuits filed by both sides. The city was ordered to pay in excess of $200,000 to resolve the dispute. When the park's initial construction was completed in 1999, the day-use park opened. A that time the park had the boat launch, tennis courts, trails (two miles worth, one mile (1.6 km) paved), two pedestrian bridges, a pond, picnic areas, parking, and the River House designed for accommodating meetings. Funds for the work came from Metro, private donations, the Tualatin Valley Water Quality Fund, and city funds. Total costs for construction of the initial phases of the park were about $1.3 million.

In 2001 to 2002, the park went through over $600,000 in upgrades partially paid for by a grant from the Oregon Lottery that added play equipment, trails, landscaping, viewpoints, and picnic areas among others. In 2001, construction began on the Lloyd Baron Rhododendron Garden at the park to build a 1.5-acre (0.61 ha) facility for the city's official flower.

In late 2007, the city drained the Woodland Pond to construct a pavilion on its shore along with repairs to the pond itself using city funds and private donations. Other work was done to the pedestrian bridges and the walkways around the pond, and two waterfalls were added. On May 17, 2008, the Woodland Pond viewing pavilion was dedicated and the pond area re-opened along with a new water feature. Construction of the new items and renovations totaled approximately $225,000 in costs. Plans call for connecting the park via a nature park and trail along Rock Creek to northeast Hillsboro and other parks in the city, eventually crossing north of the Sunset Highway. The park closed for a day in July 2014 due to reports of a cougar.

== Amenities ==
Officially 60.1 acres (24.3 ha), the city also utilizes an additional 15 acres (6.1 ha) through an agreement with Clean Water Services that operates a wastewater treatment plant adjacent to the community park. An area of 43 acres (170,000 m^{2}) of the park is covered by a forest and floodplain. One of twenty-three parks in Hillsboro, Rood Bridge is located along the Tualatin River and Rock Creek where the two water bodies meet. The park is accessed by Rood Bridge Road where Rood Bridge crosses the Tualatin. Wildlife at the park includes woodpeckers and owls among others.

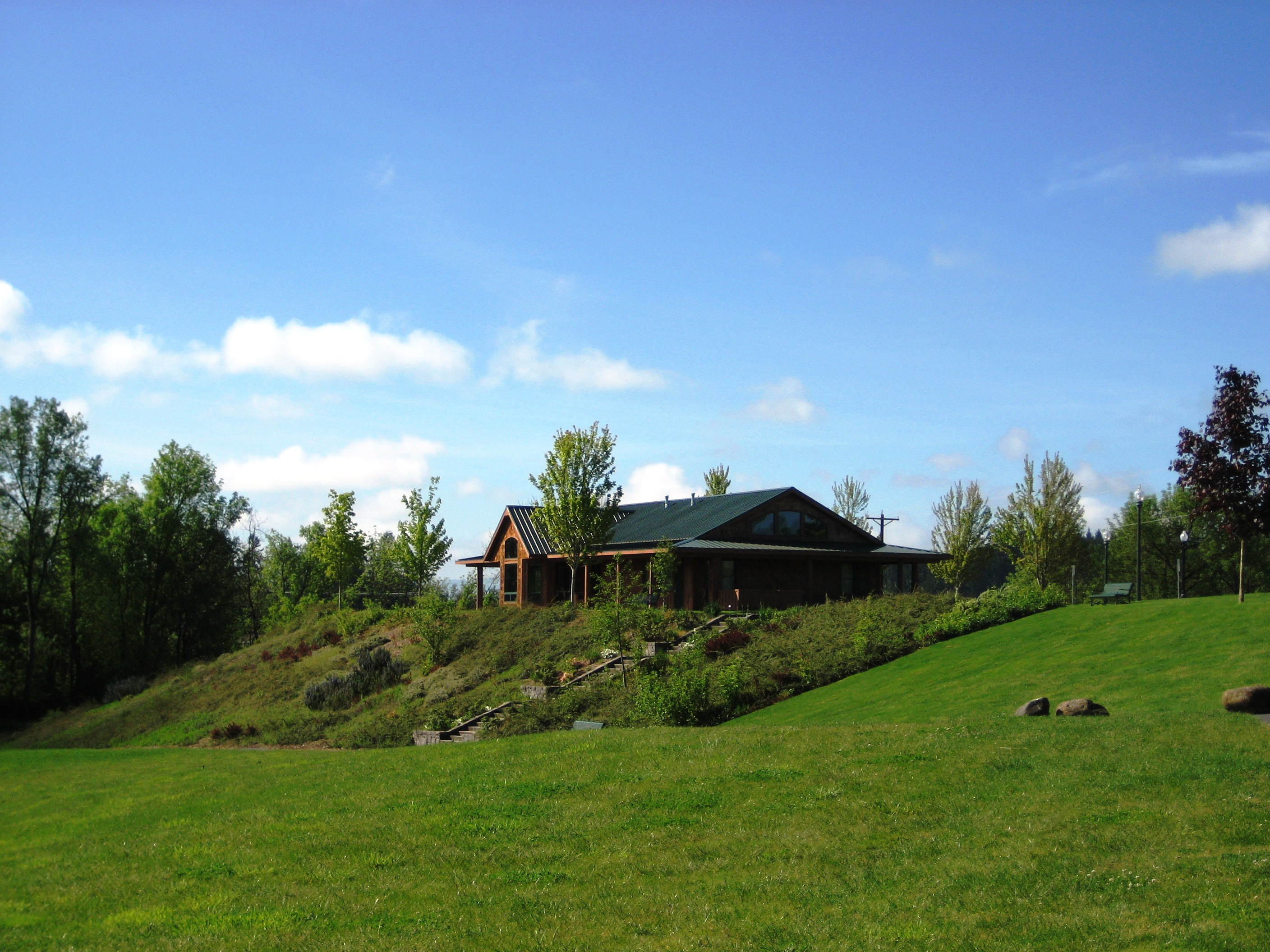
River House at Rood Bridge Park

Rood Bridge Park has wooded areas as well as grass covered sections, both crossed by biking and hiking trails. Paved trails total 12,089 feet (3,685 m) in length while other trails total 6,172 feet (1,881 m) in length. There are also restrooms, a small boat launch, and onsite parking. Recreation equipment includes a play area for children and a pair of tennis courts. The park is also used as the home course for Hillsboro High School’s cross-country team, including hosting the Bill Chapman Invitational race.

The park includes the Lloyd Baron Rhododendron Garden that contains in excess of 550 species of the plant and includes a pond. The rhododendron is the official flower of the city. The garden covers 1.5 acres (6,100 m^{2}) and has both natural and hybrid species. A concrete and stone pavilion sits on the shore of Woodland Pond and is used for events such as wedding ceremonies. There are also two waterfalls on the pond, with the waterfalls and pavilion designed by Sadafumi Uchiyama, Bob Schatz, and Ross NW Warergardens. The garden came after decades of lobbying for a garden at a city park for the species.

Also at Rood Bridge Park is the nearly 3,000-square-foot (280 m^{2}) River House. The lodge type structure is used for educational classes as well as private functions such as weddings. River House was paid for in part by city development fees and by donations of money, labor, and material from the Rotary Club. The building includes a central meeting room (Great Room), a kitchen, restrooms, a small meeting room, and an activity room. The Great Room features a fireplace, maple floors, vaulted ceilings, a small sunroom, and covers 1,260 square feet (117 m^{2}). The activity room is also used as a classroom and totals 672 square feet (62.4 m^{2}). The River House is 2,845 square feet (264.3 m^{2}) and the annex is an additional 640 square feet (59 m^{2}) and can hold 75 people.
