= The Witch's House =

2012 video game

- The Witch's House: The Diary of Ellen, Vol. 2 cover
- Developer: Fummy
- Publishers: Orig.: Fummy; Rem.: Dangen Entertainment
- Engine: RPG Maker VX; RPG Maker MV (Remake)
- Platforms: Microsoft Windows, iOS, Android macOS, Nintendo Switch, PlayStation 4, Xbox One
- Release: Windows; JP: 3 October 2012; iOS, Android; JP: 1 May 2020; The Witch's House MV; Windows, macOS; WW: 31 October 2018; Switch, PlayStation 4, Xbox One; WW: 13 October 2022
- Genre: Adventure horror
- Mode: Single-player

The Witch's House (Note: Japanese: 魔女の家, Hepburn: Majo no ie) is a 2012 adventure game created by Japanese developer Fummy. Developed in the RPG Maker VX engine, it was released on October 3, 2012 for Windows as freeware. A remake titled The Witch's House MV was created in the newer RPG Maker MV engine. It was published by Dangen Entertainment and released for Windows and macOS on October 31, 2018, with a port to Nintendo Switch, PlayStation 4 and Xbox One following in October 2022.

A prequel novel titled The Witch's House: The Diary of Ellen was released in 2013. It serves as the in-game diary of the game's antagonist Ellen. Starting in 2017, the novel was adapted into a nine-part manga series of the same name illustrated by Yuna Kagesaki, and then condensed into two tankōbon volumes.

== Gameplay ==
The game is a survival horror game in which the main goal is to solve all puzzles correctly and escape the witch's house. It contains a creepy atmosphere, complex riddles and jump scares. This game is played from bird's-eye view using ornate 16-bit graphics, and controlled via keyboard.

A black, talking cat can be met at various places in the house, serving as a save point, as well as something of a companion. Throughout the vast majority of the game, the cat is the only source of conversation, usually talking in a casual, nonchalant manner. The player's character, however, does not have any response until the ending of the game.

== Plot ==
Viola, a 13-year-old girl, awakens in the middle of a forest. As the only way out of the woods is blocked by a wall of thorns, Viola looks for another way out of the forest. On her search she finds an old mansion. As night draws close, Viola decides to enter the house.

When she enters the mansion, Viola finds that the entrance has vanished. Now trapped, Viola tries to find a way to leave the old mansion, which is filled with lethal dangers. She is accompanied throughout the mansion by a black cat with the ability to speak. Throughout the game, the history of the mansion is revealed through interactable objects and conversation with the cat. The house belongs to the witch Ellen, who was originally a young girl affected by an unknown illness and neglected by her parents. The black cat turns out to be a demon who gave Ellen her magic powers, promising her that if she lured people to the mansion for him to eat, she would be cured of her illness.

The game has several endings which can be achieved based on the decisions and the actions of the player throughout the game. In two of these endings, it is revealed that the "Viola" the player has been controlling is Ellen after stealing Viola's body. The "Ellen" visible in the game is thus Viola using Ellen's magical powers, trying to trap Ellen inside the mansion to regain her original body.

== Development and release ==
Fummy has stated they were influenced by Ib, another RPG Maker game released in 2012. The game was developed in the RPG Maker VX engine. The Witch's House was released on October 3, 2012 for Windows as freeware. In May 2020, Goodroid published iOS and Android ports based on the freeware version. It was only released in Japan.

A remake was announced in October 2018, titled The Witch’s House MV, developed by Fummy themselves. It was developed in RPG Maker MV engine and remade all graphics in the game, which took five times as much to develop as the original version. The remake has two new difficulty levels, which add new events and dialogue. It was published by Dangen Entertainment and released on October 31 for Windows via Steam. The remake was later ported to Nintendo Switch, PlayStation 4, and Xbox One and released on October 13, 2022.

== Reception ==
The Witch's House has received positive reviews. Jay Is Games gave the original release a positive review, saying it "combines the surreal creepiness of Ib with tricks, traps, and a whole lot of gore", calling it a "gory, moody, fantastic little adventure to spend an evening with", though they criticised some of the puzzles as vague and complicated.

By the end of 2013, it was reported the game had been downloaded over 200,000 times.

== Legacy ==
The Witch's House, along with Ao Oni, Yume Nikki and Ib have been credited for popularising horror games made with RPG Maker. Indie development teams AstralShiftPro and Buriki Clock have cited The Witch’s House as a source of inspiration for their games Pocket Mirror and Cloé's Requiem respectively. A haunted attraction primarily based on Ao Oni, entitled "Super Horror Game Haunted House", featured motifs from The Witch's House along with fellow indie horror games Cloé's Requiem, Death Forest and Moonlight Yokai was staged at the Niconico Super Conference in 2015. Another attraction was staged at the 2016 conference, in addition to Ao Oni and The Witch's House returning, it also featured Angels of Death, 7 Ways to Die and Tsugunohi.

== Other media ==
Fummy, who developed and published the original game, wrote a light novel which tells the backstory of Ellen before meeting the demon and becoming a witch. The book was released on October 31, 2013 via Japanese publisher Enterbrain under the name 魔女の家 エレンの日記 (Majo no Ie: Ellen no Nikki) with illustrations done by Oguchi. A Chinese-language localization was published via Chingwing Publishing.

In May 2017, mangaka Yuna Kagesaki started a manga based on the novel. It was first released in the Dragon Age magazine of publisher Kadokawa Shoten and was collected in two tankōbon volumes. American publisher Yen Press licensed the manga for an English release.
