= Little Goody Two Shoes (video game) =

2023 video game

- Developer: AstralShiftPro
- Publisher: Square Enix Collective
- Engine: Unity
- Platforms: Nintendo Switch; PlayStation 5; Windows; Xbox Series X/S
- Release: WW: October 31, 2023
- Genres: Role-playing, adventure
- Mode: Single-player

Little Goody Two Shoes is a video game developed by AstralShiftPro and published by Square Enix Collective. It includes elements of role-playing, adventure and horror games, and has an anime-inspired visual style. Players control a girl named Elise, who attempts to avoid horrific monsters in the enchanted woods while searching for a way to escape her mundane life. The game is a prequel to the 2016 RPG Maker game Pocket Mirror.

== Gameplay ==
A young girl named Elise is found by an elderly woman in the woods. Years later, after her adoptive grandmother dies, Elise performs odd jobs for the nearby villagers while fantasizing about wealth and adventure. Players control Elise as she investigates rumors of a wish-granting creature in the woods, and why horrific monsters have started coming out at night. During the day, players can perform jobs for the villagers and build relationships, including going on dates with up to three different female love interests. The jobs are action-oriented minigames, and relationships use elements of life sims and dating sims. During the night, players must guide Elise through the woods and avoid monsters. If players do not maintain positive relations with the villagers, they may accuse Elise of being a witch responsible for the monsters' appearance. Elise dies if caught by the monsters, and players must also balance her hunger and sanity. If Elise dies, players can return to a save point. There are ten different endings based on choices players make, such as who to romance.

== Development ==
The developer of the game, AstralShift, is based in Portugal. They were influenced by Mahō shōjo anime (magical girl anime targeting young women) from the 1990s, including Saint Tail, Revolutionary Girl Utena, Cardcaptor Sakura, Magic Knight Rayearth, and Slayers. In particular, they wanted Elise to emulate the strong female protagonists of these shows, both in design and writing. The world was influenced by the video games Legend of Mana, SaGa Frontier, and RPG Maker horror games such as Ib and The Witch's House MV. Though the story connects with their previous game, Pocket Mirror, Little Goody Two Shoes was designed to be standalone. It was initially designed to be a short prequel to that game, but they said it progressively grew in scale during preproduction in 2019 and 2020. Square Enix Collective released it for Windows, PlayStation 5, Xbox Series X/S, and Switch on October 31, 2023. A physical release of the game for the PS5 and Nintendo Switch version was released by Limited Run Games in 2026.

== Reception ==
Reception

Aggregate score
| Aggregator | Score |
|---|---|
| Metacritic | 84/100 |

Review scores
| Publication | Score |
|---|---|
| Nintendo Life | 7/10 |
| Push Square | 7/10 |

Little Goody Two Shoes received positive reviews on Metacritic. RPGamer praised the combination of genres but found the action sequences and puzzles frustrating. Nintendo Life similarly praised the mix of genres and criticized the puzzles. Push Square called it "an excellent life-sim adventure" but said it can become repetitive. RPGSite enjoyed the story, gameplay, and anime-inspired presentation, and they said the mix of genres was handled well by gradually introducing new gameplay elements without overwhelming players. Sports Illustrated praised the mix of influences and genres, which they said were impressively brought together. Although they criticized the puzzles and some of the writing, they said AstralShift "nailed the retro anime style". RPGFan designated it the best adventure game/visual novel of 2023, calling it "scary good" and "candy for the eyes" for its retro RPG Maker look.

In the 35th GLAAD Media Awards, Little Goody Two-Shoes was nominated for Outstanding Video Game.

== Related games ==
=== Pocket Mirror ===
Pocket Mirror
- Developers: AstralShiftPro, VisuStella
- Publisher: KOMODO
- Engine: RPG Maker VX Ace; RPG Maker MZ (GoldenerTraum)
- Platforms: Windows; PlayStation 4; PlayStation 5; Nintendo Switch
- Release: Classic; Windows; WW: July 22, 2016; GoldenerTraum; Windows; WW: May 19, 2023; PlayStation 4, PlayStation 5, Nintendo Switch: WW: October 22, 2026
- Genres: Role-playing, adventure, horror
- Mode: Single-player

Little Goody Two Shoes is a prequel of the 2016 RPG Maker game, Pocket Mirror. Pocket Mirror is a role-playing adventure horror game that includes original artwork, animation, soundtrack, and voice acting. In the game, players guide a young girl through a mysterious and surreal world as she searches for her true identity. It is presented from a top-down perspective and focuses on exploration, puzzle-solving, and story-driven progression. Players’ decisions can influence how the story unfolds, leading to multiple possible endings. The story is about a young girl who wakes up in a strange mansion with no memory of her past and only a pocket mirror with her. As she explores the mansion’s dark halls and rooms, she meets different characters, solves puzzles, and slowly learns the truth about who she is and the evil hidden inside the mansion.

The original Pocket Mirror was created by AstralShiftPro. The group, consisting of around fifteen members included artists, composers, voice actors, a writer, a programmer, and an animator. The game was developed using RPG Maker VX Ace and was heavily inspired by classic RPG horror titles, such as Ib and The Witch's House and fairy-tale themes. After its release, the developers continued to update the game, with version 1.3 becoming the final update. AstralShift later announced that Pocket Mirror Classic would no longer receive any new fixes or patches. The last available version can still be downloaded from Itch.io.

In 2022, AstralShift announced a remake of the game titled Pocket Mirror: GoldenerTraum (“Golden Dream” in German). The remake was built completely from the ground up using RPG Maker MZ, featuring enhanced visuals, updated gameplay, and expanded story content. It was officially released on May 19, 2023. The remake aimed to refine the original experience while staying true to its tone and atmosphere. On March 26, 2026, it was announced that the game will get console ports for PlayStation 4 and PlayStation 5. These ports, along with a port for Nintendo Switch, were released on October 22, 2026.

=== Hell Maiden ===
Hell Maiden
- Developer: AstralShiftPro
- Publisher: AstralShiftPro
- Engine: Unity
- Platforms: Windows; Nintendo Switch 2; PlayStation 5; Xbox Series X/S
- Release: Windows; WW: July 16, 2026; PlayStation 5, Xbox Series X/S, Nintendo Switch 2; WW: TBA
- Genre: Role-playing
- Mode: Single-player

Hell Maiden is an upcoming horde survival deck-building game developed and published by AstralShiftPro for Windows. The game is a loose sequel to the Divine Comedy and follows Dante on a second journey to Paradiso after losing the memories of her initial trip and awakening to find herself back in the depths of Hell. The game was initially teased on January 10, 2025. The demo for Hell Maiden launched on October 13, 2025 on Steam with early access being released on July 16, 2026.
