= A Kingdom of Quartz =

Japanese manga series

- First tankōbon volume cover, featuring Blue

クオーツの王国 (Kuōtsu no Ōkoku)
- Genre: Adventure; Dark fantasy
- Manga
- Written by: Bomhat
- Published by: Kodansha
- English publisher: NA: Kodansha USA
- Imprint: Afternoon KC
- Magazine: Monthly Afternoon
- Original run: December 23, 2022 – January 24, 2025
- Volumes: 5
- icon

A Kingdom of Quartz (Japanese: クオーツの王国, Hepburn: Kuōtsu no Ōkoku) is a Japanese manga series written and illustrated by Bomhat. It was serialized in Kodansha's seinen manga magazine Monthly Afternoon from December 2022 to January 2025, with its chapters collected in five tankōbon volumes.

== Plot ==
The story is set in a world split in two, where one group inhabits each: Celes, winged beings who live in the Quartz Kingdom; and Demons, large grotesque creatures who live in the darkness. Before they were separated by the Goddess spirit, the world was beset by war and violence. The Quartz Kingdom is separated by four districts, each owned by a family favored by the Goddess. Located in the center in the first district, floating above, is the great Crystal that powers the kingdom, and the Citadel where the royal family resides. Their holy knights, the Angels, protect the kingdom's inhabitants from Demons. Of the Angels, only seven are given the highest title of Archangel, with the leader being Prince Cassian.

A young Celes girl named Blue dreams of becoming an Angel herself, despite being ostracized for her wings being pitch black while other Celes' wings are white, stirring rumors that she may be a Demon. One night, her orphanage is attacked by invading Demons, killing off many Celes and even several Angels. In her attempts to defeat a Demon, Blue grows a mysterious dark power and causes it to explode, catching the attention of Prince Cassian. Rescuing her from danger, Cassian gives her an offer to become an Archangel. Three years later, Blue begins her Angel training in the Helios Training Academy, while keeping her dark power a secret.

== Publication ==
Written and illustrated by Canadian artist Bomhat, A Kingdom of Quartz originated as a one-shot submitted for the Spring 2021 Afternoon Shiki Shō, where it won as runner-up alongside three other winners, and was published in Comic Days. It was later serialized in Kodansha's seinen manga magazine Monthly Afternoon from December 23, 2022, to January 24, 2025. It was originally written in English, then translated to Japanese for release by M. Fulcrum. Kodansha collected its chapters in five tankōbon volumes, released from May 23, 2023, to April 23, 2025.

In North America, the manga was licensed for English release by Kodansha USA. Five volumes were released in print and digitally from February 20, 2024, to June 9, 2026.

=== Volumes ===
No.	Original release date	Original ISBN	English release date	English ISBN
1	May 23, 2023	978-4-06-531688-7	February 20, 2024 (digital); February 27, 2024 (print)	979-8-88933-499-6 (digital); 979-8-88877-126-6 (print)
1. "Blue, the Orphan"; 2. "Cassian, the Prince"; 3. "To the Citadel"; Bonus Chapter: "An Average Day at Quartz Co."
2	September 22, 2023	978-4-06-532951-1	June 18, 2024	979-8-88933-643-3 (digital); 979-8-88877-242-3 (print)
4. "Welcome to the Academy"; 5. "I Want to Become Stronger"; 6. "A Promise of Souls"; 7. "Doors"
3	May 22, 2024	978-4-06-535520-6	September 9, 2025	979-8-89478-692-6 (digital); 979-8-88877-418-2 (print)
8. "Spilled Blood"; 9. "Leviathan"; 10. "Noah"; 11. "The Oracle"; 12. "Beyond the Kingdom"; Special Episode: "Blue the Fish"
4	December 23, 2024	978-4-06-537723-9	December 9, 2025	979-8-89478-784-8 (digital); 979-8-88877-581-3 (print)
13. "A Demon?"; 14. "Trade"; 15. "The Dying Swan"; 16. "Blue, the Demon"
5	April 23, 2025	978-4-06-539205-8	June 9, 2026	979-8-89830-136-1 (digital); 979-8-88877-687-2 (print)
17. "Blacken"; 18. "Goddess"; 19. "Killian"; 20. "Weapon of Heaven"

== Reception ==
In a review of the first volume, Kevin Cormack of Anime News Network praised the manga's artwork and rich world-building, along with its dark tone that clashed with its "cutesy and pretty" art, describing it as "Witch Hat Atelier meets Haibane Renmei by way of The Ugly Duckling." He graded it an "A", with his only criticism being the volume's short length. Reviewing the remaining four volumes, Cormack continued to praise the manga's artwork and characters, particularly Blue, who transforms from a "plucky innocent to formidable fighter to morally compromised savior". However, he noted the story felt rushed towards the end and wondered if Bomhat was "forced to wrap things up prematurely", grading it an "A-".
