= Nippon Marathon =

2018 video game

Nippon Marathon Nippon Marathon Turbo
- Steam cover art
- Developer: Onion Soup Interactive
- Publishers: PQube Limited exA-Arcadia (Turbo)
- Directors: Andy Madin, Amy Madin
- Producer: Andy Madin
- Designer: Andy Madin
- Programmer: Andy Madin
- Artist: Amy Madin
- Writers: Andy Madin, Amy Madin
- Composer: Robert Ruby
- Series: Nippon Marathon
- Engine: Unity
- Platforms: exA-Arcadia; Microsoft Windows; PlayStation 4; Xbox One; Nintendo Switch; Mac OS X
- Release: Windows, PlayStation 4, Xbox One, Nintendo Switch, Mac OS X; 18 December 2018; Arcade; April 2021
- Genres: Party, action, racing
- Modes: Single-player, multiplayer

Nippon Marathon is a party, action, racing game developed by British studio Onion Soup Interactive and published by PQube Limited. In April 2021, an enhanced arcade version titled Nippon Marathon Turbo was released in arcades on exA-Arcadia. This version focuses solely on multi-player racing courses and does not have mini games. Two new characters called Hato and Princess were added as selectable characters and the art was drawn by Namco's Numan Athletics artist, Tatsuya Ishikawa.

== Reception ==
Reception

Aggregate score
Aggregator	Score
Metacritic	(XONE) 49/100 (PS4) 54/100 (Switch) 44/100 (PC) No score

Review score
Publication	Score
Nintendo Life	6/10

According to review aggregator Metacritic, Nippon Marathon received mixed to unfavourable critic reviews for PlayStation 4, Xbox One and Nintendo Switch, with the PC release currently having no score.

Nintendo Life gave the Switch release a 6/10 calling the visuals and nature of the physics "an acquired taste", but praised the multiplayer and recommended it to anyone looking for a "silly party game".
