= Chris Hart (musician) =

American singer (born 1984)

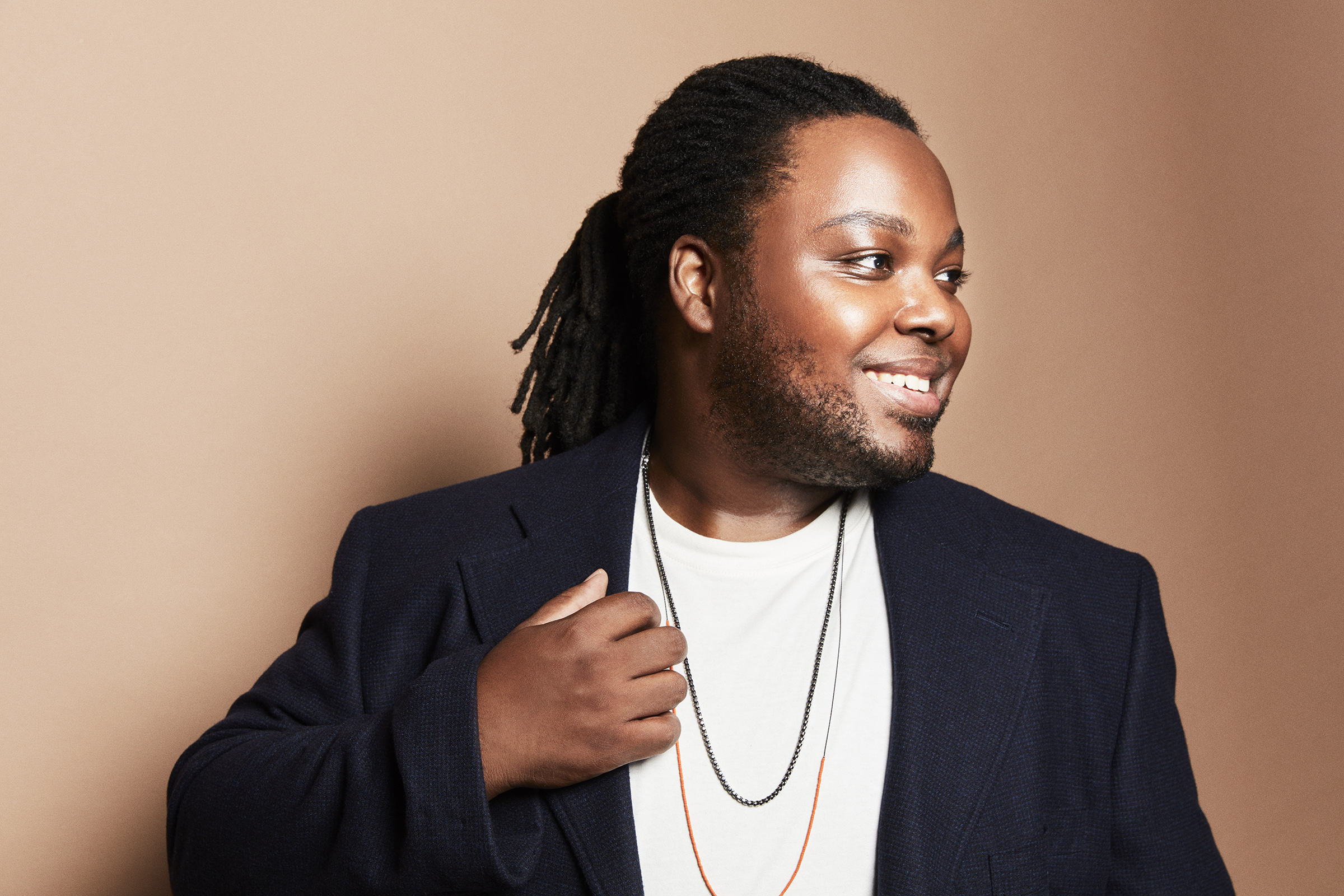

Background information
- Born: 25 August 1984 (age 42); Palo Alto, California, U.S.
- Origin: Japan
- Genre: J-pop
- Occupations: Singer, songwriter, producer
- Instruments: Vocals, guitar
- Years active: 2003-present
- Label: Universal Sigma
- Website: Chris Hart Official Twitter

Chris Hart (クリス・ハート, Kurisu Hāto; born August 25, 1984) is an American-born Japanese singer, songwriter, and producer who gained popularity as a J-pop artist in Japan.

== Early life and education ==
Chris Hart was born August 25, 1984, in Palo Alto, California to musician parents, who separated when he was 2 years old. He has an older sister and a younger half-brother. Hart developed an interest in Japanese music, language, and culture when he was 12 years old after taking a Japanese class at his school in the Palo Alto Unified School District. In college he majored in music and Japanese and took jobs in an airport and with a Japanese cosmetics company to maintain his connection. Upon moving to Japan, he took a job working on vending machines.

== Career ==
In 2003, Hart was vocalist of the band NIKITA w/Metallic Beasts, which covered Japanese visual kei artists.

In 2007 Hart began a solo band called LYV. As LYV, Hart wrote all lyrics and music in Japanese. He released a digital album titled Voyager.

Upon relocating to Japan, Hart performed around Japan independently at live houses, events, festivals, on TV programs and at weddings. In 2011, Hart was a part of the vocal unit "Triple Trip" with whom he did a regular radio program on Kawasaki FM. They released one digital single titled "NEW WORLD". Hart is also credited for the English lyrics of the Tsukuba Daigaku theme song, "Imagine The Future".

In 2012, a YouTube video Hart made was noticed by executives for the Nippon Television show Nodojiman The World, a reality contest that features non-Japanese singing Japanese songs, and he was invited to compete in the show. He appeared three times in 2012. Producer Jeff Miyahara noticed Hart's performance, and asked to produce him.

In 2013 his cover of the Yusaku Kiyama song "Home" reached number 8 in Japanese sales on the Oricon Singles Chart. His album of cover songs, released soon after, reached third, selling over 300,000 copies.

Hart released an original collaboration single, "Yume Ga Samete", with JPOP Legend, Matsuda Seiko for their label, Universal Sigma's 10th anniversary.

Hart and Seiko Matsuda sang "Yume ga Samete" at the 64th annual Kōhaku Uta Gassen.

On February 26, 2014, Hart released his first original single, "I LOVE YOU", and his first original album Song for You on March 19, 2014. It ranked #7 on the Oricon Weekly Charts.

Hart released his follow-up to "Heart Song", called "Heart Song II", on June 25, 2014. It ranked number 2 on the Oricon Weekly Charts. He later released a Christmas album, Christmas Hearts, on November 12, 2014. The album ranked number 8 on the Oricon Weekly Charts and would be Hart's fourth consecutive album to rank in the top 10. It was later announced that Hart would participate in the 65th annual Kōuhaku Uta Gassen. He sang his cover "Ito" by Miyuki Nakajima.

In 2015, it was announced that Chris Hart would release a single with Gospellers titled "Tsuzuku Michi with Gospellers" and embark on his third nationwide tour. The 47-prefecture hall tour titled "Chris Hart 47 Prefecture Tour 2015-2016~Tsuzuku Michi~ Presented by IBJ", was the first for a non-Japanese artist.

On June 25, 2015, it was announced that Hart had exceeded cumulative album sales of 1 million units. It was also announced that the theme song to the TV Asahi mystery drama Saikyo no Futari would be sung by him. The new original song from Hart, "Anata e", was announced with a single release date of August 26, 2015. It is Hart's third original single.

In 2016, Hart co-wrote the song "Boku wa kokode ikiteiku". The song would be featured on NHK Minna no Uta. He also announced his 47 prefecture tour's final show at Nippon Budokan titled after the single, "Chris Hart Nippon Budokan LIVE 'Boku wa kokodeikiteiku' 47 prefecture tour 2015-2016~tsuzuku michi~ Final". Hart announced his follow up tour, a second 47 prefecture tour titled, "Chris Hart 2nd 47 Prefecture Tour~My Hometown~" lasting from 2016 to 2017. The tour featured local mascots for each show, ending in Tokyo at the Tokyo International Forum Hall A. In total Hart would hold 98 concerts between the two consecutive 47 Prefecture Tours.

On April 6, 2017, Hart announced his naturalization to Japanese citizenship.

On December 5, 2017, he announced on his official blog that he would take an indefinite hiatus to continue his study of music and spend time with his family. Hart also released his first compilation album "Kokoro no Uta~Chris Hart BEST~" which featured a collection of his previously released original and cover songs. The album would feature a newly recorded cover of Kazumasa Oda's song "Daijoubu" and a new original song "Dreams". The promotional video for "Dreams" featured a dance routine performed by renowned ballet dancer, Shoko Nakamura.

Hart performed his last one-man show at NHK Hall on April 13, 2018. There he performed the duet song "Fanfare" with singer Murakami Keisuke. The song was co-written by Hart, Murakami and songwriter Paul Ballard.

In 2018, Chris Hart's original song "I Love You" would shoot up the charts to reach #13 for the 2018 Oricon Karaoke Ranking. Singer, FUKI, would release the first official cover of Hart's song. Various artists would go on to cover the song.

In 2019, Hart began a new project with songwriter Paul Ballard, called A.P.E. They would co-write the music for the song "For One's Smile feat Chris Hart" for the artist, Ai Kawashima. Hart would also provide vocals for the song. As A.P.E, they are credited for the arrangement of artist May J.'s cover of Chris Hart's original song "I Love You", for her album "Heisei Love Song Covers".

A.P.E. is credited for the score and sound design of the Canadian film "Viaticum" directed by, and starring Lara Daans. The film won a Gold Award for Best Sound Design with the Mindfield Film Festival - Albuquerque (November 2019).

In 2021, Hart released 3 digital singles, monochromatic, chanto~mother's blues~, and flashback. The singles were followed by his 3rd original album, COMPLEX. These were Hart's first self-produced and self-written singles and album. Hart is credited for various compositions, lyrics, arrangements, and full production of the album.

In September 2022 Hart was featured on the remix of the song "Life Was a Beach" by German singer Lena Meyer-Landrut after the original song gained popularity in Japan.

In January 2025, Hart announced he departed ways with his record label Universal Sigma, citing personal life conflicts.

== Personal life ==
Chris Hart grew up in Palo Alto, California and attended Gunn High School. He married Japanese singer Hitomi Fukunaga in 2012, having 3 children with her, and was married to Mayuko Kaneshita, who he has 2 children with, as of 2024. Hart became a Japanese citizen in 2017; in accordance with Japanese nationality law, Hart relinquished American citizenship.

== Discography ==
=== Albums ===
- Heart Song (2013)
- Heart Song -Special Edition- (2013)
- Song for You (2014)
- Heart Song II (2014)
- Christmas Hearts (2014)
- Heart Song III (2015)
- Kokorono Uta -Chris Hart Best (2017)
- Complex (2021)

=== Singles ===
- "home" (2013)
- "Yume ga Samete" (夢がさめて; "Waking From a Dream") (2013)
- "I LOVE YOU" (2014)
- Mamoritai ~magic of a touch~
- Tsuzuku Michi with Gospellers 2015)
- "I LOVE YOU" (2020)

== Awards and certifications ==
28th Annual Japan Gold Disc Awards

- New Artist of the Year (Japanese Domestic): Chris Hart
- 5 Best New Artists (Japanese Domestic)
