= Glencoe High School (Oregon) =

High school in the United States

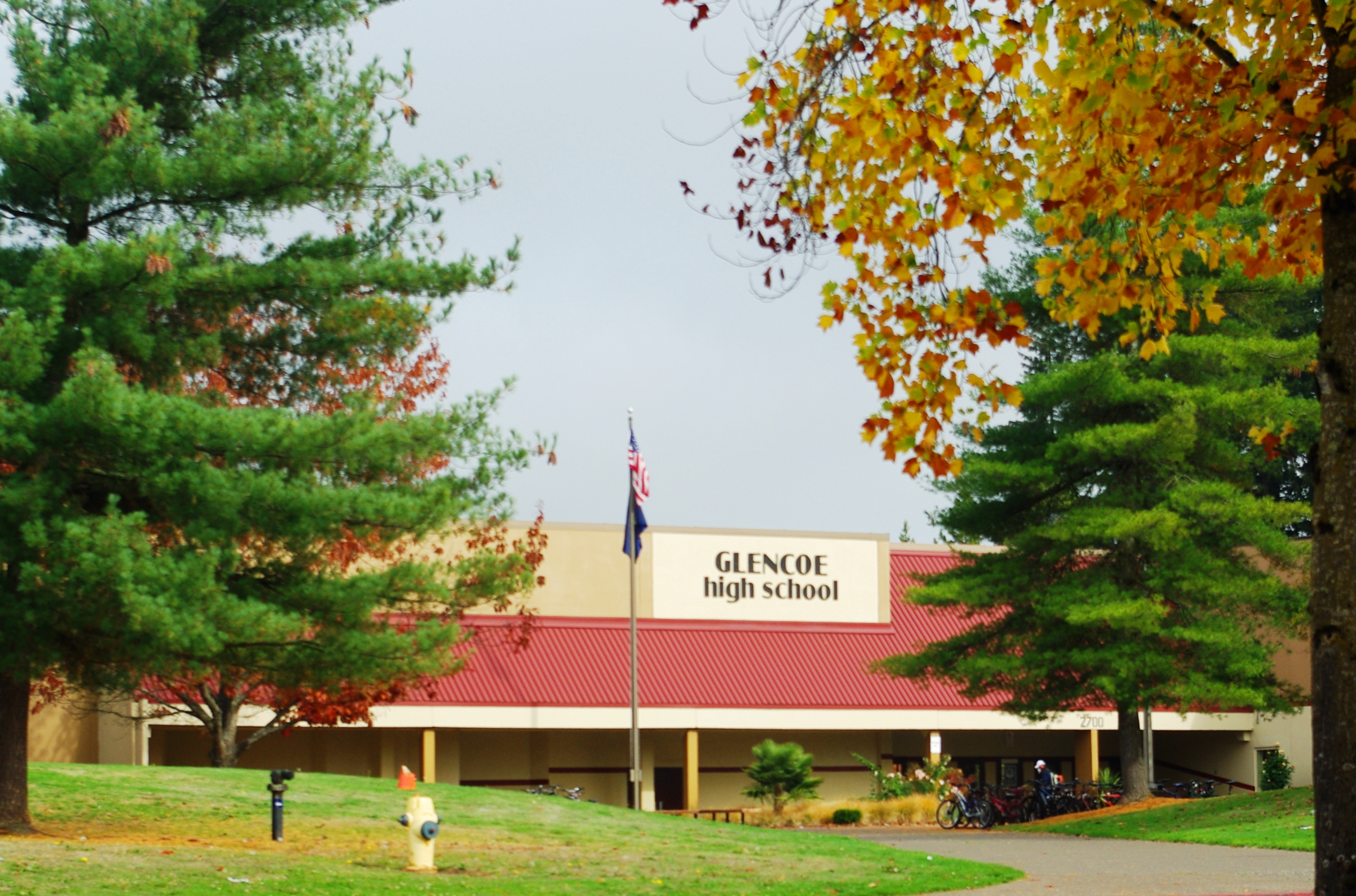

Location
- 700 NW Glencoe Road; Hillsboro, Oregon 97124; United States; 45.542187°N 122.993188°W

Information
- School type: Public, high school
- Opened: 1980
- School district: Hillsboro School District 1J
- Principal: Claudia Ruf
- Staff: 67.79 (FTE)
- Grades: 9-12
- Enrollment: 1,498 (2023–2024)
- Student to teacher ratio: 22.10
- Language: English
- Campus: Suburban
- Colors: Crimson, black, and white
- Mascot: Tide Guy
- Team name: Crimson Tide
- Rival: Hillsboro High School
- Newspaper: Today's Current (online)
- Feeder schools: Evergreen Middle School
- Website: Glencoe High School website

Glencoe High School is a public secondary school in Hillsboro, Oregon, that is part of the Hillsboro School District. It was founded in 1980 to relieve overcrowding at Hillsboro High School caused by the city's rapid expansion. Glencoe High is the second oldest of the four high schools in the city. Glencoe is classified as a 6A school for activities and sports. It takes its name from the former community of Glencoe. In 2003, the school, along with all schools in the district, made national news when 17 days of classes were cut from the school year due to budget cuts to education in Oregon. In 2016, the graduation rate was 86%.

== Academics ==
In 2008, 85% of the school's seniors received a high school diploma. Of 384 students, 328 graduated, 34 dropped out, five received a modified diploma, and 17 were still in high school the following year.

The school received a silver ranking in U.S. News & World Report's 2010 "America's Best High Schools" survey. For the second year in a row, Glencoe was recognized by the State of Oregon on the Oregon Report Card as "Exceptional"; one of six large high schools in the state to receive that recognition. Glencoe is a certified Project Lead The Way school.

== Athletics ==
Glencoe has won state championships in track and field, men's and women's basketball, and football (twice, in 1986 and 1994). In 2018 the school moved from the 6A-2 Metro League to the 6A-3 Pacific Conference. In the 2007–08 season Glencoe won its first state championship in soccer. Its cross-town rival has been Hillsboro High School; however, Hilhi currently plays in the 5A-1 Northwest Oregon Conference. Since opening, the school has used the off-campus Hare Field for football games.

The school has been state champions in the following sports in the following years:

- 2010 - 5A softball
- 2007 - 5A boys' soccer
- 1994 - 4A football
- 1990 - 4A girls' basketball
- 1989 - 3A boys' track and field
- 1986 - 3A football
- 1983 - 3A boys' basketball

== Notable alumni ==
- Erik Ainge, football player
- Brett Collins, football player
- Jason Earles, actor
- Nicholas Edwards, singer
- Lisa Gardner, novelist
- Ben Petrick, baseball player, Colorado Rockies
- Scott Rueck, OSU women's basketball coach
