= Trash Taste =

Podcast

- Genre: Anime and manga fandom; Japanese popular culture
- Language: English

Creative team
- Developed by: GeeXPlus

Cast and voices
- Hosted by: Joey Bizinger; Connor Colquhoun; Garnt Maneetapho

Production
- Production: Meilyne Tran
- Length: 2+ hours

Technical specifications
- Video format: YouTube
- Audio format: MP3

Publication
- No. of seasons: 3
- No. of episodes: 332 (as of 30 October 2026)
- Original release: 2020
- Updates: Weekly

Related
- Related shows: Abroad in Japan
- Website: trashtaste.com

YouTube information
- Channels: Trash Taste; Trash Taste Highlights; Trash Taste After Dark; Trash Taste Shorts
- Years active: 2020–present
- Subscribers: 3.18 million (combined)
- Views: 1.55 billion (combined)
- Last updated: 1 November 2026

Trash Taste (Japanese: トラッシュ・テイスト) is a weekly audio and video podcast hosted by Joey Bizinger, Garnt Maneetapho, and Connor Colquhoun – three Tokyo-based content creators primarily focusing on anime and Japanese pop culture. The podcast generally discusses Japanese culture and life in Japan.

== History ==
The podcast was started in February 2020 by Kadokawa's talent agency division GeeXPlus, which was originally a subsidiary of BookWalker, who helped the two hosts (Garnt and Connor) relocate to Japan, assisting them in having more access to Japanese culture. GeeXPlus and BookWalker also promote their products on the hosts' channels. They decided to start a podcast that had already been planned for some time. The first episode of the podcast was uploaded to YouTube on 5 June 2020. Since then, new episodes have been released every Friday, with exceptions for the release of specials.

The first live show, Trash Taste After Dark, was broadcast on Twitch on 26 January 2021. This was followed on 19 February when they co-streamed the 5th Crunchyroll Anime Awards.

On 26 May 2021, the hosts moved out of the studio in which they had recorded the first fifty-four episodes, dubbed season one, and relocated to a new studio that officially kicked off season two. On 17 June 2021, the hosts were invited for a live 'podcast' event about Japan-based YouTubers by the Foreign Correspondents' Club of Japan; discussions ranged from living in Japan to how Trash Taste got started. Trash Taste also appeared in the Foreign Correspondent Club Japan's Number 1 Shimbun Magazine June 2021 volume.

On 19 March 2022, they hosted a 24-hour-long charity event for Doctors Without Borders on Twitch, raising $181,000 in donations.

In May–July 2022, Trash Taste podcast recordings were done outside of Japan for the first time. This included three episodes in London, eight in Los Angeles, and one Trash Taste After Dark episode at the Twitch Australia studio in Sydney (aired 17 July 2022). These episodes were released on 10 June through 9 September 2022. Also during this time, the hosts held Q&A/discussion panels and special events at MCM London Comic Con, Anime Expo, Florida Supercon, and SMASH! In October 2022, during the Trash Taste 2022 Tour, the hosts participated at the New York Comic Con and had an impromptu podcast recording in Tampa, Florida (aired 25 November 2022).

== Format ==
Discussions in the podcast are about more than just anime and delve into various topics, including otaku culture, life in Japan, and topics varying on the episode's theme. The show will occasionally have a special guest, and an entire episode will be devoted to them. Past guests included:

- Akidearest
- Aleks Le
- Anthony Padilla
- Boy_Boy
- Chris Broad (eight appearances)
- Cold Ones
- Daidus (two appearances)
- DillonGoo
- Emirichu (four appearances)
- Ethan Nestor
- The Gaming Beaver
- Geno Samuel
- HasanAbi (two appearances)
- Hori Benny
- I Did a Thing
- Ironmouse
- jacksepticeye
- Jessica Nigri
- Josh Strife Hayes
- Kaho Shibuya (three appearances)
- Ken Arto
- Kevin Penkin (two appearances)
- Kson
- Lachlan Power
- Ladybeard (two appearances)
- LazarBeam
- LilyPichu
- Ludwig Ahgren (three appearances)
- Meilyne Tran (two appearances)
- Michael Koji Fox
- Michael Reeves
- Mori Calliope (two appearances)
- Mudan (two appearances)
- Nano
- Noriyaro
- NileRed
- Penguinz0
- PewDiePie (two appearances)
- Pokimane
- PremierTwo (four appearances)
- ProZD (two appearances)
- Reina Scully
- RinRin Doll
- Robcdee
- Sally Amaki (three appearances)
- Shindo L
- Shu Uchida
- Steve Maeda
- Super Eyepatch Wolf
- SushiKebabGuy
- Sydsnap (two appearances)
- Sykkuno
- William Osman
- Yoshihiro Watanabe

Generally, each episode is between one and three hours long and is broken up intermittently with sponsor spots and a list of all Patreon subscribers near the end. The intro and outro title card feature the copyright-free song "Soul Searching" by Causmic.

The podcast's producer is Meilyne Tran, and Toomas Lismus (MudanTV) does the video editing.

== Tours ==
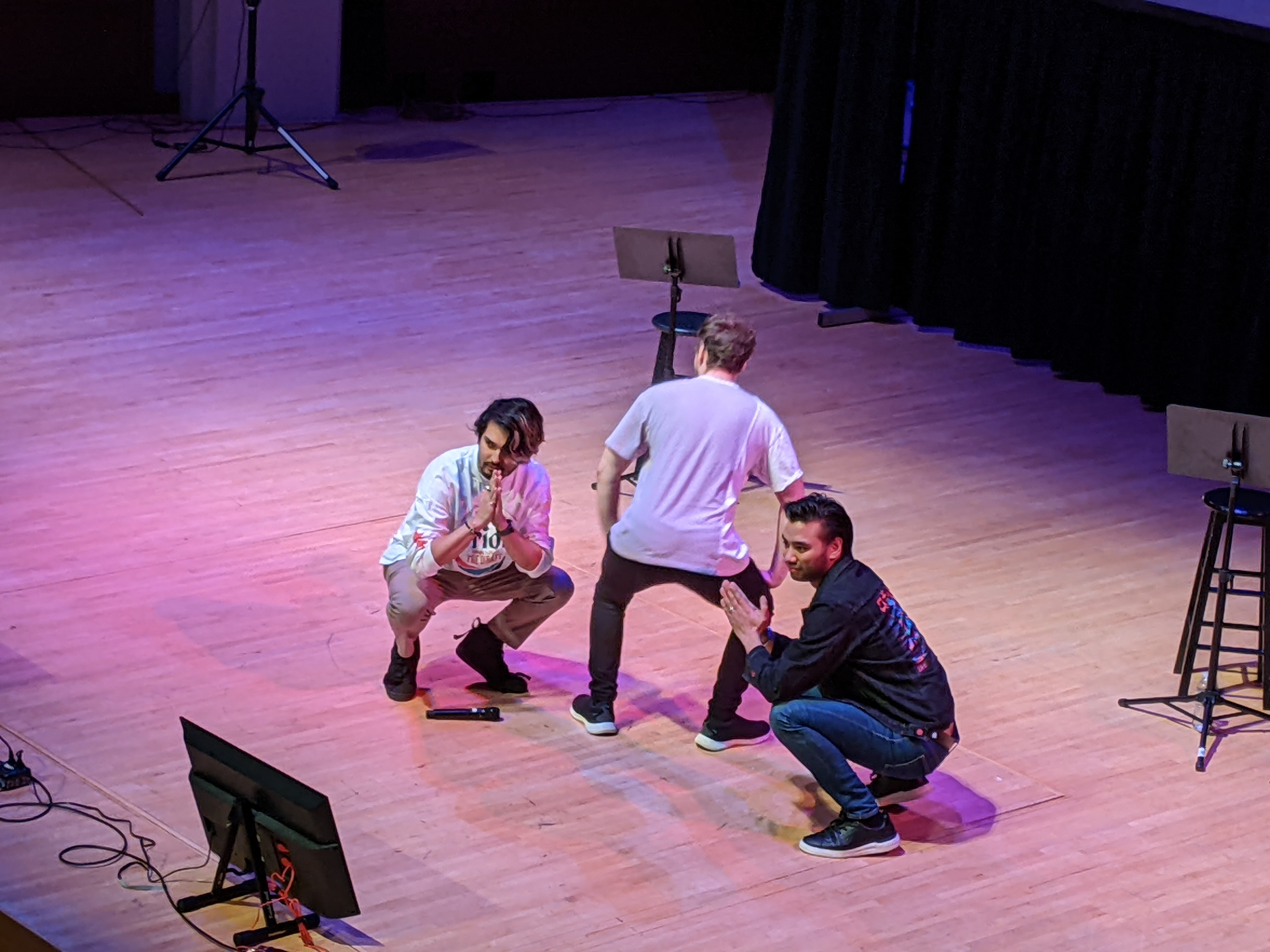
The hosts posing for the audience in Raleigh, North Carolina

On 23 September 2022, Trash Taste podcast embarked on its first live tour, with 23 stops in North America, beginning in Los Angeles, California, and ending on 30 October in Portland, Oregon.

Announced on the 5 May 2023 podcast, the second live tour was from 30 August to 11 September, with eight European stops, beginning in Dublin, Ireland, and ending in Cardiff, Wales. On 26 April 2024, a one-show event of the Trash Taste Tour was held in Australia. Hosted by DreamHack Melbourne, the show was held at the Rod Laver Arena.

=== Shows ===
List of shows, showing date, city, country and venue
Date	City	Country	Venue
2022 Tour — North America
23 September 2022 (Note: Tester show)	Los Angeles	United States	Wilshire Ebell Theatre
25 September 2022	Saint Paul	United States	Fitzgerald Theater
27 September 2022	Chicago	United States	The Vic Theatre
28 September 2022	Cleveland	United States	Agora Theatre
30 September 2022	Royal Oak (Note: Promoted as Detroit)	United States	Royal Oak Music Theatre
2 October 2022	Toronto	Canada	Queen Elizabeth Theatre
4 October 2022	Boston	United States	Shubert Theatre
5 October 2022	Glenside (Note: Promoted as Philadelphia)	United States	Keswick Theatre
8 October 2022	New York City	United States	Palladium Times Square
9 October 2022	Washington, D.C.	United States	Lincoln Theatre
10 October 2022	Raleigh	United States	Meymandi Concert Hall
12 October 2022	Nashville	United States	James K. Polk Theater
14 October 2022	Orlando	United States	The Plaza Live
16 October 2022	Dallas	United States	Majestic Theatre
17 October 2022	Austin	United States	Paramount Theatre
19 October 2022	Kansas City	United States	Folly Theater
21 October 2022	Denver	United States	Paramount Theatre
22 October 2022	Salt Lake City	United States	The Union Event Center
24 October 2022	Phoenix	United States	Orpheum Theatre
25 October 2022	Los Angeles	United States	Ricardo Montalbán Theatre
26 October 2022	San Francisco	United States	Palace of Fine Arts
29 October 2022	Seattle	United States	Moore Theatre
30 October 2022	Portland	United States	Revolution Hall
2023 Tour — Europe
30 August 2023	Dublin	Ireland	The Helix
2 September 2023	Copenhagen	Denmark	DR Koncerthuset
3 September 2023	Rotterdam	Netherlands	Oude Luxor Theater
4 September 2023	Amsterdam	Netherlands	De Meervaart
5 September 2023	Stockholm	Sweden	Cirkus
6 September 2023	Oslo	Norway	Folketeateret
7 September 2023	Berlin	Germany	Urania Humboldt-Saal
9 September 2023	London	England	Eventim Apollo
11 September 2023 (Note: The show on 11 September 2023 was originally scheduled at St David's Hall. However, it was moved to Cardiff University Students' Union after the venue was closed due to the discovery of reinforced autoclaved aerated concrete on its roof.)	Cardiff	Wales	Cardiff University Students' Union
2024 Tour — Australia
26 April 2024	Melbourne	Australia	Rod Laver Arena

== YouTube ==
The Trash Taste podcast has four channels on YouTube. The main channel, Trash Taste, was created on 14 February 2020 and includes all podcast episodes and specials. Trash Taste After Dark (originally called Trash Taste Streams) was created on 23 August 2019 and features recorded live streams from the podcast's Twitch channel and behind-the-scenes videos. Trash Taste Highlights, established on 14 February 2020, and Trash Taste Shorts, created on 11 March 2022, both provide short clips from each podcast episode that are significant or interesting. All four channels have received a silver YouTube Play Button for surpassing 100,000 subscribers. In contrast, only the main channel has received the gold YouTube Play Button for surpassing one million subscribers, which it achieved on 17 July 2021.

=== Specials ===
Typically debuting on a week in which no podcast episode is released, the specials, available exclusively on YouTube, feature the hosts of Trash Taste outside the studio.

No.	Title	Original release date	Running time
S01	"The Chess Tournament Arc"	25 August 2020	1:17:07
The hosts participate in a chess tournament with other anime YouTubers, thanks to Chess.com.
S02	"We Tried Real Tokyo Drifting and FAILED"	30 October 2020	0:47:38
The hosts go to Ebisu Circuit to learn how to drift. This special also featured Abroad in Japan, who was the videographer and driver.
S03	"We Tried Cycling Across Japan and FAILED"	26 February 2021	1:08:20
The hosts go to Hiroshima Prefecture to cycle the 70-kilometre (43 mi) Nishiseto Expressway.
S04	"Trash Taste PC Building Speedrun"	28 June 2021	0:44:50
Each host is tasked with assembling a PC as fast as possible. (This was also the first special hosted in a live stream on Twitch.)
S05	"We Became Japan's WORST Michelin Star Chefs"	7 January 2022	1:16:10
The hosts visit Cafe & Diner「Offza」to learn how to cook and then are judged on how closely they replicate a dish, similar to MasterChef.
S06	"We Drove 3,274km Across ALL of Japan"	9 November 2022	1:35:16
The hosts travel 3,274 kilometres (2,034 mi) in nine days across Mainland Japan, from Cape Sata to Cape Sōya.
S07	"We Went on Tour in America"	31 May 2023	2:09:40
Recording of the 2022 Trash Taste Tour at the Montalbán Theatre in Los Angeles, California (25 October 2022).
S08	"We Became Americans for a Day and FAILED"	4 July 2023	0:33:14
The hosts participate in a food challenge at Oh My Burger and shoot various guns at a shooting range.
S09	"We Became MAIDS for a Day and FAILED"	30 January 2024	0:42:49
The hosts serve at a maid café at DreamHack Melbourne 2023.
S10	"We Became Japan's WORST Kendo Masters"	26 March 2024	0:24:07
The hosts learn the basics of Kendo.
S11	"We Raced Across Hawaii And FAILED"	23 April 2024	1:22:26
The hosts do a series of challenges across the island of Oʻahu.
S12	"We Tried Japan's Hardest Escape Room and FAILED"	18 June 2024	0:39:14
The hosts do a Sword Art Online theme escape room at the Kabukichō tower.
S13	"We Ate EVERYTHING In Japan"	11 September 2024	1:03:39
The hosts roam Tokyo, eating various foods.
S14	"We Became Australians for a Day and FAILED"	18 February 2025	0:47:36
The hosts roam the Australian state of Victoria, trying to imitate the typical Aussie.
S15	"We Raced Across TOKYO and FAILED"	6 August 2025	0:46:56
The hosts speed-run Tokyo, doing various challenges along the way.
S16	"THE TRASH TASTE WINTER SPECIAL"	28 October 2025	1:21:00
The hosts compete in a series of challenges in Switzerland.
S17	"We Speedran Every Drive-Thru in Tokyo"	20 October 2026	1:02:32
The hosts visit 10 fast-food restaurants in Tokyo; also featuring Peter Macy (PremierTwo).

== Podcast episodes ==
=== Season 1 (2020–2021) ===
No.	Title	Original release date	Running time
0	"Trash Taste Pilot"	20 June 2020	28:43
1	"The Worst Anime Podcast Has Arrived"	5 June 2020	1:16:10
2	"The Struggles of Life in Japan"	12 June 2020	1:51:35
3	"The Anime That Shaped Our Childhoods"	19 June 2020	1:07:49
4	"How to NOT Buy Anime Figures"	26 June 2020	1:19:59
5	"Don't Be a YouTuber in Japan (ft. Abroad in Japan)"	3 July 2020	2:15:54
6	"Don't Watch Anime to Learn Japanese"	10 July 2020	2:06:29
7	"The Internet Kinda Sucks Right Now"	17 July 2020	1:39:13
8	"We Don't Understand Anime Games"	24 July 2020	1:52:32
9	"Japan's Earthquakes Are Terrifying"	31 July 2020	1:47:44
10	"Our Dark Past with Anime YouTube"	7 August 2020	2:12:32
11	"Sitting Down with a Japanese 𝒫ó𝓇𝓃𝓈𝓉à𝓇 (ft. Shibuya Kaho)"	14 August 2020	2:21:04
12	"College Horror Stories"	21 August 2020	1:55:23
13	"Uncovering Secrets Behind Anime Piracy"	28 August 2020	2:06:03
14	"The Most BORING Anime"	4 September 2020	2:01:43
15	"The REAL Japanese Nightlife Experience"	11 September 2020	2:14:46
16	"The WORST Fandoms in Anime"	18 September 2020	2:12:33
17	"The Japanese Food You've Never Tried"	25 September 2020	2:25:47
18	"We've Fallen Down the Vtuber Rabbit Hole"	2 October 2020	1:58:35
19	"We Need a Break From YouTube"	9 October 2020	2:16:32
20	"Exposing Our Degenerate Side (ft. Sydsnap)"	16 October 2020	2:19:44
21	"Roasting our WORST Takes on Anime"	23 October 2020	2:10:59
22	"Anime Convention Horror Stories"	6 November 2020	2:12:26
23	"We Met a REAL Virtual YouTuber (ft. Mori Calliope)"	13 November 2020	2:06:06
24	"We're Too Addicted To The Internet"	20 November 2020	1:57:07
25	"The ℌệ𝔫𝔱ằ𝔦 Episode"	27 November 2020	2:15:22
26	"Our Trash Taste in YouTubers"	4 December 2020	2:28:41
27	"The #1 Drifting YouTuber in Japan (ft. Noriyaro)"	11 December 2020	2:03:05
28	"Are Online Friends REAL Friends?"	18 December 2020	2:15:43
29	"Christmas Horror Stories"	25 December 2020	1:51:56
30	"A Very Drunk Start to the New Year (ft. Abroad in Japan)"	1 January 2021	2:23:57
31	"Japan Is A Real Life Gacha Game"	8 January 2021	1:57:27
32	"We Don't Know How to Poop"	15 January 2021	2:09:07
33	"We're Too Addicted to Gacha Games"	22 January 2021	2:13:19
34	"Roasting Our Horrible Anime Tastes"	29 January 2021	2:23:27
35	"We Have Trash Taste in Manga"	5 February 2021	2:03:24
36	"Talking to a REAL JoJo Animator (ft. Ken Arto)"	12 February 2021	1:49:44
37	"How to NOT Flirt with a YouTuber"	19 February 2021	2:03:15
38	"Talking to a REAL Japanese Anime Singer (ft. Nano)"	5 March 2021	2:00:38
39	"THINGS THAT TERRIFY US"	12 March 2021	1:51:18
40	"The WORST Japanese Convenience Store Food"	19 March 2021	1:56:25
41	"The YouTuber Life is CURSED"	26 March 2021	1:52:56
42	"Exposing the Truth of YouTube (ft. Akidearest)"	2 April 2021	2:12:16
43	"Our Trash Taste In TV"	9 April 2021	2:03:30
44	"Sitting Down with a Pro Cross-Dressing Idol Wrestler (ft. Ladybeard)"	16 April 2021	2:26:04
45	"Roasting our Terrible Taste in Games"	23 April 2021	2:13:36
46	"Let's Just JUMP Right Into It (ft. Reina Scully)"	30 April 2021	2:20:19
47	"We Don't Understand Live Streamers"	7 May 2021	1:47:16
48	"Do We Drink Too Much??"	14 May 2021	2:12:40
49	"The Worst Things You Can Do in Japan (Old: We Should Never Travel in Japan)"	21 May 2021	2:28:28
50	"The Trash Taste Awards"	28 May 2021	2:38:47
51	"We've Had Enough of Japan"	4 June 2021	2:01:24
52	"We Can't Stop Giving Bad Opinions"	11 June 2021	1:56:46
53	"We Read The WORST ℌệ𝔫𝔱ằ𝔦 Doujins (Old: The Doujin Episode)"	18 June 2021	2:27:54
54	"Goodbye Trash Taste Season 1"	25 June 2021	1:57:44

=== Season 2 (2021–2022) ===
No.	Title	Original release date	Running time
55	"Welcome to Trash Taste Season 2"	2 July 2021	2:00:23
56	"100 WAYS TO DIE IN JAPAN (ft. Abroad in Japan)"	9 July 2021	2:15:19
57	"Proving We're Actually an Anime Podcast"	16 July 2021	1:56:08
58	"Talking to a REAL Japanese Anime Voice Actor (ft. Shu Uchida)"	23 July 2021	1:58:06
59	"The Biggest Scandal in Anime History"	30 July 2021	1:48:35
60	"Roasting our Terrible Taste in Movies"	6 August 2021	2:18:43
61	"Roasting our Trash Taste in Manga"	13 August 2021	2:56:44
62	"Our Terrible Boomer Takes"	20 August 2021	2:13:52
63	"Summer in Japan IS HELL"	27 August 2021	1:59:39
64	"We Hate Our Fans"	3 September 2021	2:21:07
65	"We CANNOT Stop Arguing"	10 September 2021	1:57:20
66	"We Got SCAMMED"	17 September 2021	2:18:30
67	"EXPOSING Our Manager (ft. Meilyne Tran)"	24 September 2021	2:25:16
68	"The Dark World of Chris Chan (ft. Geno Samuel)"	1 October 2021	2:13:49
69	"Nice"	8 October 2021	2:04:50
70	"Quarantine Nightmares"	15 October 2021	2:19:04
71	"WE ARE PRIVILEGED"	22 October 2021	2:05:58
72	"GHOSTS DON'T SCARE US"	29 October 2021	2:12:52
73	"WE WILL NEVER UNDERSTAND JAPANESE"	5 November 2021	2:21:03
74	"The Vtuber Rap God Returns (ft. Mori Calliope)"	12 November 2021	2:16:00
75	"WE LIVE IN A SOCIETY"	19 November 2021	2:14:26
76	"We Don't Understand Public Holidays"	26 November 2021	2:00:21
77	"Trash Taste Tech Tips"	3 December 2021	2:13:35
78	"Sitting Down With a REAL Japanese Host"	10 December 2021	2:30:17
79	"THE ANIME FIGURE SPECIAL"	17 December 2021	2:38:40
80	"Last Trash Taste of 2021"	24 December 2021	2:07:33
81	"Our WORST Food Takes Yet"	31 December 2021	2:04:33
82	"WE ALMOST DIED"	14 January 2022	2:04:39
83	"Sitting Down with a Legendary Japanese Vtuber (ft. Kson)"	21 January 2022	2:16:54
84	"WE ARE DYING (ft. Abroad in Japan)"	28 January 2022	2:25:28
85	"The Boys Went Snowboarding"	4 February 2022	2:02:08
86	"We're Still an Anime Podcast"	11 February 2022	2:15:15
87	"Our Awkward Fan Interactions"	18 February 2022	1:54:41
88	"The Dream Episode"	25 February 2022	2:04:19
89	"Roasting Our Trash Taste In Music"	4 March 2022	2:16:52
90	"WE DON'T UNDERSTAND SPORTS"	11 March 2022	2:12:17
91	"Animals We Could Beat in a Fight"	18 March 2022	2:07:10
92	"Our Lives Are a Sitcom"	25 March 2022	1:37:06
93	"The Metaverse was a Mistake"	1 April 2022	2:01:36
94	"This Is Why Real Men Cry"	8 April 2022	2:08:13
95	"We Survived a MASSIVE Earthquake in Japan"	15 April 2022	2:07:33
96	"Proving We Are TRULY Trash Men"	22 April 2022	2:07:05
97	"Our SECRET Japan Travel Tips"	29 April 2022	2:07:11
98	"Wedding Planning is an Absolute Nightmare"	6 May 2022	2:04:31
99	"JAPAN IS OPENING UP TO NEW PEOPLE (ft. @Daidus)"	13 May 2022	2:11:11
100	"The 2nd Annual Trash Taste Awards"	20 May 2022	2:22:34
101	"The Struggles of a Storytime Youtuber (ft. @Emirichu)"	27 May 2022	2:31:32
102	"Goodbye Japan"	3 June 2022	1:59:26

=== Season 3 (2022–present) ===
No.	Title	Original release date	Running time
103	"Our First Trash Taste Convention"	10 June 2022	1:46:09
104	"Sitting down with a REAL Anime Composer (ft. Kevin Penkin)"	17 June 2022	2:00:34
105	"Sitting Down With a Real ℌệ𝔫𝔱ằ𝔦 Artist (ft. Shindo L)"	24 June 2022	1:52:37
106	"TOP OF THE MORNING (ft. @jacksepticeye)"	1 July 2022	2:04:17
107	"OUR BOY GOT MARRIED"	8 July 2022	2:00:18
108	"OFFLINETV CROSSOVER (ft. @LilyPichu)"	15 July 2022	2:04:40
109	"Daily Life of a Mad Scientist (ft. @Michael Reeves)"	22 July 2022	2:04:18
110	"We Spent a Day with @AnthonyPadilla"	29 July 2022	2:08:24
111	"Sitting Down With a Professional Voice Actor (ft. @ProZD)"	5 August 2022	2:01:17
112	"THE BOIZ ARE GOING ON TOUR!"	12 August 2022	2:01:10
113	"Sitting Down with a Professional Cosplayer (ft. @Jessica Nigri)"	19 August 2022	2:07:18
114	"Sitting Down with YouTube's Top Streamer (ft. @Ludwig)"	26 August 2022	2:22:11
115	"We Are The WORST Movie Reviewers"	2 September 2022	1:54:31
116	"Sitting Down with a Top Female Streamer (ft. @Pokimane)"	9 September 2022	2:16:05
117	"Cycling is HARD"	16 September 2022	2:05:31
118	"We are the Garbage Taste Podcast (ft. @William Osman)"	23 September 2022	2:21:52
119	"We HATE Celebrities"	30 September 2022	1:56:58
120	"The Most Dangerous Man on YouTube (ft. @NileRed)"	7 October 2022	2:16:58
121	"We Are NOT Alphas"	14 October 2022	1:52:48
122	"MR. AFFABLE RETURNS (ft. @Abroad in Japan)"	21 October 2022	2:02:33
123	"THE TRASHIEST SHOWER THOUGHTS"	28 October 2022	1:55:55
124	"HE'S FINALLY HERE (ft. @PewDiePie)"	4 November 2022	2:07:32
125	"Japanese Festivals are a LIE"	11 November 2022	2:00:44
126	"Our Trash Taste in TV Shows"	18 November 2022	2:16:40
127	"We Finally Confront Moist Critical (ft. @penguinz0)"	25 November 2022	2:22:02
128	"Our REAL Thoughts on America"	2 December 2022	1:59:12
129	"Why We Will NEVER Have Kids"	9 December 2022	2:07:29
130	"Defending The WORST Takes We've Ever Had"	16 December 2022	1:52:45
131	"CHRISTMAS IS CANCELED"	23 December 2022	1:59:28
132	"Trash Taste 2022 Review"	30 December 2022	1:58:25
133	"Secrets of Ludwig’s Chessboxing Event"	6 January 2023	2:04:19
134	"We HATE Being Tourists"	13 January 2023	2:03:15
135	"Last Moments Before Death"	20 January 2023	1:58:25
136	"This Episode is A.I. Generated"	27 January 2023	1:53:09
137	"The Dark Side of Teaching in Japan (ft. @PremierTwo)"	3 February 2023	2:07:52
138	"We Actually Watched Anime"	10 February 2023	2:05:19
139	"We Terrified Our Parents in Japan"	17 February 2023	1:47:56
140	"Garnt got married AGAIN"	24 February 2023	2:01:13
141	"The Worst Food Takes EVER (ft. @Emirichu)"	3 March 2023	2:04:59
142	"WE FELL OFF"	10 March 2023	2:03:17
143	"Ruining the Purest Mind on YouTube (ft. @Sykkuno)"	17 March 2023	2:05:44
144	"We Watched The Most CURSED ℌє𝖓𝖙𝖆𝖎"	24 March 2023	2:07:37
145	"The Most Controversial Anime Takes (ft. @HasanAbi)"	31 March 2023	2:03:29
146	"The SPICY Food Takes Don't Stop"	7 April 2023	2:02:50
147	"The BOIS go to HAWAII"	14 April 2023	1:56:06
148	"The WEIRDEST Places in Japan"	21 April 2023	1:50:18
149	"Horror Anime SUCKS"	28 April 2023	1:57:59
150	"The 3rd Annual Trash Taste Awards"	5 May 2023	1:54:47
151	"Teaching Weebs how to SHOWER"	12 May 2023	2:02:12
152	"Sitting Down with a Japanese Anime Producer"	19 May 2023	1:58:36
153	"WE CAN'T STOP PLAYING GACHA"	26 May 2023	1:49:14
154	"Our First Live Podcast"	2 June 2023	1:46:29
155	"WE DON'T UNDERSTAND IDOLS"	9 June 2023	1:55:15
156	"Is Fortnite Overrated? (ft. @lachlan)"	16 June 2023	1:50:30
157	"WHY DOES LIVE ACTION ANIME SUCK?"	23 June 2023	1:54:22
158	"The Most INSANE Australians (ft. @coldones)"	30 June 2023	2:03:39
159	"We Don't Know How To Make Friends..."	7 July 2023	2:00:17
160	"What Anime Conventions DON'T Tell You"	14 July 2023	1:55:16
161	"WE HAVE NO ENEMIES"	21 July 2023	1:57:23
162	"We Sat Down With Australia's Biggest YouTuber (ft.@LazarBeam)"	28 July 2023	1:55:43
163	"The Most Affable Man is BACK (ft. @Abroad in Japan)"	4 August 2023	2:29:13
164	"THE FUTURE SUCKS"	11 August 2023	2:04:47
165	"HOW TO GET BANNED FROM EVERY COUNTRY (ft. @Ididathing & @Boy_Boy)"	18 August 2023	1:52:37
166	"We’re Now Too Old For Anime"	25 August 2023	2:05:04
167	"We Sat Down With A REAL Japanese Idol (ft. @sallyamakiofficial)"	1 September 2023	1:54:05
168	"We Have an Existential Crisis"	8 September 2023	1:41:14
169	"The Most Drunk We've Been On Trash Taste"	15 September 2023	2:34:15
170	"Our HOTTEST Takes About Europe"	22 September 2023	2:01:55
171	"Why We All Quit Anime YouTube (ft. @supereyepatchwolf3007)"	29 September 2023	1:56:28
172	"The 7 Anime That Every Fan NEEDS To Watch"	6 October 2023	2:00:03
173	"Exposing Our Editor (ft. @Mudan)"	13 October 2023	2:04:38
174	"We Drunk Every Beer in JAPAN"	20 October 2023	2:02:13
175	"She’s a Regular Here! (ft. Shibuya Kaho)"	27 October 2023	2:00:32
176	"These YouTubers Are Destroying Japan"	3 November 2023	1:52:33
177	"The BEST Endings in Anime"	10 November 2023	1:49:35
178	"Our Biggest Dating Red Flags"	17 November 2023	1:50:45
179	"The Struggles of an Aspiring Actor (ft. @PremierTwo)"	24 November 2023	2:03:44
180	"The Conspiracy Theory Episode"	1 December 2023	1:55:20
181	"Should we move to Korea?"	8 December 2023	1:42:33
182	"Roasting our Trash Taste in FOOD"	15 December 2023	1:54:47
183	"Our Favorite Things of 2023"	22 December 2023	2:13:31
184	"Trash Taste Is Changing In 2024..."	29 December 2023	2:10:08
185	"The hardest choices we had to make..."	5 January 2024	1:48:39
186	"We rated the Top Ranked Anime's on MAL"	12 January 2024	2:00:57
187	"We Roasted Our Friend's Taste in Anime"	19 January 2024	2:15:45
188	"DAD IS BACK! (ft.@PewDiePie)"	26 January 2024	2:02:38
189	"The Biggest Gaming Controversies"	2 February 2024	2:00:20
190	"We RUINED Our Friendship"	9 February 2024	1:50:43
191	"We Took YOUR AWFUL Advice"	16 February 2024	1:47:15
192	"We Tried the WORST Drinking Game"	23 February 2024	2:12:16
193	"Netflix Live Actions Are At It Again"	1 March 2024	2:04:23
194	"Trash Taste TOP 5 RANKING Of Everything"	8 March 2024	1:55:57
195	"We Wouldn't Be Friends Without Trash Taste"	15 March 2024	1:56:24
196	"Saying Goodbye to a Legend"	22 March 2024	1:43:47
197	"We Sat Down with Tokyo's TOP Lolita Model (ft. @rinrindolljapan)"	29 March 2024	1:47:18
198	"We Watched YOUR ℌệ𝔫𝔱ằ𝔦 Suggestions and Regret It"	5 April 2024	1:50:15
199	"The Truth of Anime Voice Acting (ft. @AleksLe)"	12 April 2024	1:50:15
200	"We Rated the Top Ranked Manga on MAL"	19 April 2024	1:49:38
201	"Has Trash Taste Changed?"	26 April 2024	2:06:46
202	"OUR BOY RAISED 1 MILLION DOLLARS"	3 May 2024	1:55:04
203	"WE GOT DRUNK WITH OUR OWN BEER"	10 May 2024	1:54:29
204	"The 4th Annual Trash Taste Awards"	17 May 2024	1:55:41
205	"WE CAN'T STOP WASTING COMPANY FUNDS"	24 May 2024	2:05:45
206	"We Rated the Most Popular Games of All Time"	31 May 2024	1:50:05
207	"We AREN'T SMART ENOUGH FOR ART"	7 June 2024	1:54:42
208	"Trash Taste MEME REVIEW"	14 June 2024	1:49:02
209	"WE CAN'T DO EXERCISE"	21 June 2024	2:09:32
210	"We FORCED The Boys To Watch This"	28 June 2024	2:58:41
211	"THE TRASH TASTE TOURNAMENT ARC"	5 July 2024	2:05:23
212	"WE CAN'T STOP DRINKING"	12 July 2024	1:43:16
213	"We Rated the BEST and WORST Things of All Time"	19 July 2024	2:09:06
214	"THE RETURN OF LUDWIG (ft. @ludwig)"	26 July 2024	2:19:21
215	"Finding the BEST Era of Anime"	2 August 2024	2:07:29
216	"Our Wildest Anime Expo Stories"	9 August 2024	1:48:54
217	"WE DON'T UNDERSTAND THE OLYMPICS"	16 August 2024	1:54:24
218	"Roasting Our Viewer's Hottest Takes"	23 August 2024	1:49:02
219	"TRASH TASTE FOOD TOURNAMENT"	30 August 2024	1:48:17
220	"SITTING DOWN WITH SIR AFFABLE (ft. @Abroad in Japan)"	6 September 2024	2:29:52
221	"Our Friend's Biggest Red Flags"	13 September 2024	2:02:27
222	"Our Deepest Episode Yet"	20 September 2024	2:05:04
223	"America, We're Sorry..."	27 September 2024	2:06:01
224	"We Found the Worst Tier Lists"	4 October 2024	1:50:13
225	"OUR BOY TURNED 30"	12 October 2024	2:00:24
226	"This is Why we Can't Trust Each Other"	19 October 2024	1:52:19
227	"Our Viewers FORCED Us To Play This"	25 October 2024	2:08:37
228	"hese Games are IMPOSSIBLE to Finish"	1 November 2024	1:55:28
229	"SITTING DOWN WITH MISS INTERNATIONAL (ft. Shibuya Kaho)"	8 November 2024	1:59:05
230	"Proving We Have The Same Brain Cell"	15 November 2024	1:59:01
231	"This is the WORST Area in Japan"	22 November 2024	2:05:42
232	"We Finally Got Judged For Our Worst Takes (ft. @ProZD)"	29 November 2024	2:26:37
233	"We Can't Stand Zoomers"	6 December 2024	1:52:04
234	"These Are Our WORST Takes"	13 December 2024	2:00:16
235	"Our Favorite Things in 2024"	20 December 2024	1:53:34
236	"The Trash Taste 2024 Year in Review"	27 December 2024	1:49:16
237	"THE GIGACHAD IS BACK (ft. @PremierTwo)"	3 January 2025	1:59:54
238	"We Rated the Top Ranked Movies of All Time"	10 January 2025	2:03:31
239	"We Owe The UK An Apology (ft. @Daidus)"	17 January 2025	2:09:34
240	"We Read the Wildest Confessions and Regret it"	24 January 2025	1:48:58
241	"OUR BOY IS LEAVING US (ft. @Mudan)"	31 January 2025	1:56:06
242	"Our Parents Got Addicted to Anime"	7 February 2025	1:44:03
243	"Our Brutally Honest Review of Japan"	14 February 2025	2:00:50
244	"We Love Sweaty Anime Men (ft. @HasanAbi)"	21 February 2025	1:50:18
245	"The Boys Went to Switzerland"	28 February 2025	1:52:40
246	"We Rated The WORST Ranked Anime Of All Time"	7 March 2025	1:52:24
247	"We Started an Anime Club"	14 March 2025	1:48:12
248	"Love And How Deep? (ft. @sydsnap)"	21 March 2025	2:00:11
249	"Our WORST Childhood Crushes"	28 March 2025	1:48:12
250	"We Made Every 3x3 EVER"	4 April 2025	2:02:13
251	"The Abysmal Food Takes Are BACK (ft. @Emirichu)"	11 April 2025	1:58:29
252	"You Forgot How Cool Dinosaurs Are (ft. @AGamingBeaver)"	18 April 2025	2:00:30
253	"ABSOLUTE CINEMA"	25 April 2025	1:58:06
254	"We Roasted ALL Our Friends Hottest Takes"	2 May 2025	2:00:09
255	"ANIME FANS ARE EATING GOOD IN 2025"	9 May 2025	1:44:30
256	"We Played the Most Cursed ℌệ𝔫𝔱ằ𝔦 Games and Regret it"	16 May 2025	1:46:20
257	"You've Been Sleeping on Chinese Anime"	23 May 2025	1:58:12
258	"The 5th Annual Trash Taste Awards"	30 May 2025	1:57:25
259	"JOEY'S GETTING MARRIED!"	6 June 2025	1:58:02
260	"We Sat Down With The Internet's Most Knowledgeable Gamer (ft. @JoshStrifeHayes)"	13 June 2025	1:57:42
261	"TRASH TASTE GOES VIRTUAL (ft. @IronMouseParty)"	20 June 2025	2:11:22
262	"Everyone Deserves Generational Welsh"	27 June 2025	1:57:05
263	"OUR BOY MADE AN ANIME"	4 July 2025	1:55:14
264	"The Man Who's Changing Animation for Youtube (ft.@dillongoo)"	11 July 2025	1:57:25
265	"We Watched the Most Down Bad Anime of All Time"	18 July 2025	1:56:10
266	"THIS is How You Make Good Anime Music (ft. Kevin Penkin)"	25 July 2025	1:57:55
267	"The Dark Side of the Idol World (ft. @sallyamakiofficial)"	1 August 2025	1:51:55
268	"The CRAZIEST Anime Expo of Our Lives"	8 August 2025	1:57:55
269	"We Nearly Got Kicked Out of America (Again)"	15 August 2025	1:50:24
270	"Going Tip to Tip With Ludwig (ft.@ludwig)"	22 August 2025	1:35:55
271	"Not Even Horse Girls Can Cure Our Depression"	29 August 2025	2:05:06
272	"This is Why Japan Feels So Anime"	5 September 2025	1:55:46
273	"We Played Truth or Drink"	12 September 2025	2:02:48
274	"CHINA"	19 September 2025	1:55:18
275	"BÂAN HITS THEATERS"	26 September 2025	1:57:24
276	"This Anime Shouldn’t be Allowed on TV"	3 October 2025	1:56:23
277	""We Were Born in the Wrong Generation""	10 October 2025	2:14:43
278	"We Rated Your Most Unpopular Opinions"	17 October 2025	2:00:43
279	"The Boys Go to Portugal"	24 October 2025	1:26:17
280	"We Watched the Worst Movie of All Time"	31 October 2025	2:01:06
281	"Sitting Down With Final Fantasy's Head Localizer (ft. Michael Koji Fox)"	7 November 2025	2:00:43
282	"We Hosted an Anime Battle Tournament"	14 November 2025	1:39:47
283	"LADYBEARD IS BACK!! (ft. Ladybeard)"	21 November 2025	2:20:32
284	"You NEED to Stop Skipping Anime Movies"	28 November 2025	1:44:31
285	"This Anime Made Us SO Angry"	5 December 2025	1:53:10
286	"We're Terrified of Technology"	12 December 2025	1:37:31
287	"Our Favorite Things of 2025"	19 December 2025	2:38:25
288	"The Trash Taste 2025 Year in Review"	26 December 2025	1:47:08
289	"What They Don't Tell You About Being a Father in Japan (ft. @PremierTwo)"	2 January 2026	2:00:07
290	"The Apocalypse Episode"	9 January 2026	1:50:50
291	"This is the Most Banned Anime"	16 January 2026	1:55:32
292	"Our Viewers Sent Us Their Top Anime"	23 January 2026	1:54:44
293	"SEA GANG RISE UP"	30 January 2026	1:52:56
294	"Our Friendship Has Gone Too Far"	6 February 2026	1:55:55
295	"The Man Behind YouTube's Craziest Experiment (ft.@ethan)"	13 February 2026	1:55:24
296	"We Finally Watched it"	20 February 2026	1:52:43
297	"Sitting Down With Japan's Top Anime Tattoo Artist (ft. Hori Benny)"	27 February 2026	2:02:48
298	"We Ranked the Internet's Dumbest Tier Lists"	6 March 2026	2:01:47
299	"Do We Still Share the Same Brain Cell?"	13 March 2026	1:53:55
300	"THREE HUNDRED"	20 March 2026	1:58:18
301	"Our Viewers Sent us Their WORST ℌє𝖓𝖙𝖆𝖎"	27 March 2026	1:41:32
302	"MR AFFABLE STRIKES BACK (ft. @AbroadinJapan)"	3 April 2026	2:47:23
303	"We're Getting Dumber"	10 April 2026	1:52:38
304	"Anime Peaked in the 2000s"	17 April 2026	1:59:42
305	"Dark Fantasy Anime is so BACK!"	24 April 2026	1:54:15
306	"We Rated the Worth Things of All Time"	1 May 2026	1:52:16
307	"OUR BOY OPENED AN ANIME CAFE"	8 May 2026	1:58:35
308	"We Got Drunk Answering Your Strangest Questions"	15 May 2026	2:01:19
309	"Collecting Doesn't Feel the Same Anymore"	22 May 2026	1:57:25
310	"The 6th Annual Trash Taste Awards"	29 May 2026	1:59:05
311	"Southeast Asia Broke Our Boy"	5 June 2026	2:13:14
312	"We Defended the Hottest Takes of All Time"	12 June 2026	1:58:27
313	"The Hardest Questions We've Answered..."	19 June 2026	2:05:55
314	"Gamers Are Eating Good in 2026"	26 June 2026	2:00:37
315	"We Tried Defending Anime's WORST Villains"	3 July 2026	1:42:05
316	"We've Come Full Circle"	10 July 2026	1:51:25
317	"Old Anime Isn't Always as Good as You Remember"	17 July 2026	1:42:05
318	"We Finally Got Called Out (ft.@Emirichu)"	24 July 2026	2:07:15
319	"We Found the Internet's Dumbest Conspiracies"	31 July 2026	1:49:36
320	"This Might Get us Back Into Anime"	7 August 2026	1:48:14
321	"We Watched Japan's Most Controversial Anime"	14 August 2026	2:08:16
322	"Sitting Down With an Idol's Alter Ego (ft. @sallyamakiofficial)"	21 August 2026	1:56:31
323	"Adulting is a Myth"	28 August 2026	1:49:43
324	"Sitting Down With the Angel of Shibuya (ft. @Robcdee)"	4 September 2026	1:53:00
325	"Revisiting Our Horrible Taste in Anime"	11 September 2026	1:54:59
326	"Everything's Bigger in America"	18 September 2026	1:58:35
327	"We Gave the Trashiest Life Advice"	25 September 2026	1:56:44
328	"We Roasted Our Viewer's Trash Taste in Anime"	2 October 2026	1:59:53
329	"Is Whimsy Dead?"	9 October 2026	1:58:52
330	"How One Piece Broke the Live Action Curse (ft. Steve Maeda)"	16 October 2026	1:53:17
331	"Isekai is SO Back"	23 October 2026	1:45:49
332	"Anime Club Just Got Spooky"	30 October 2026	1:51:03
