= Chris Broad =

Chris Broad may refer to:

- Chris Broad (cricketer) (born 1957), English former cricketer, broadcaster, and cricket official
- Chris Broad (YouTuber) (born 1990), British YouTuber known for his channel Abroad in Japan
