= Open Sauce =

Annual STEM convention

- Status: Active
- Genre: STEM
- Venue: San Mateo County Event Center
- Locations: San Mateo, California, U.S.
- Country: United States
- Years active: 3
- Inaugurated: July 15, 2023; 3 years ago
- Founder: William Osman
- Most recent: July 17, 2026; 3 months ago
- Next event: July 17, 2027; 8 months' time
- Attendance: >20,000 (2024)

Open Sauce is an annual convention focused on science, technology, engineering, and mathematics (STEM) held in the San Francisco Bay Area, California. Established in 2023 by YouTuber William Osman, the event brings together content creators, engineers, and technology enthusiasts to display various engineering projects and technological innovations. It features a wide range of activities including exhibitions, panels, workshops, and live demonstrations.

== History and organization ==
=== Initial concept and launch ===
YouTuber William Osman founded Open Sauce in 2023 to provide a venue for science and engineering enthusiasts to connect and showcase their work. The event was created to appeal to science and engineering enthusiasts, particularly younger audiences. The first Open Sauce event was held at San Francisco's Pier 35. It attracted over 10,000 attendees and featured 150 exhibitors.

=== Growth ===
Since its inception, Open Sauce has more than doubled in size and scope. In 2024, the event moved to the Cow Palace in Daly City to accommodate the over 20,000 attendees and 500 exhibitors, in response to growing attendance and increased participation in STEM fields. The event has garnered sponsorship from various tech companies. Open Sauce has been held at the San Mateo County Event Center since 2025.

=== Sauceathon ===
A new event in 2024, hosted by William Osman, that intends to be a hackathon-style under the banner of Open Sauce, occurring on August 31, 2024. From the official website: "Sauceathon is a hackathon-style event where engineers collaborate to develop a creative solution to a software and hardware challenge." Revealed on the day of the event, hackathon teams were to create a robot vehicle capable of following a line. The event hosted sponsors from PCBWay, a printed circuit board manufacturer, and Parallax, Inc., a robotics manufacturer.

== Event features ==
=== Exhibitions ===
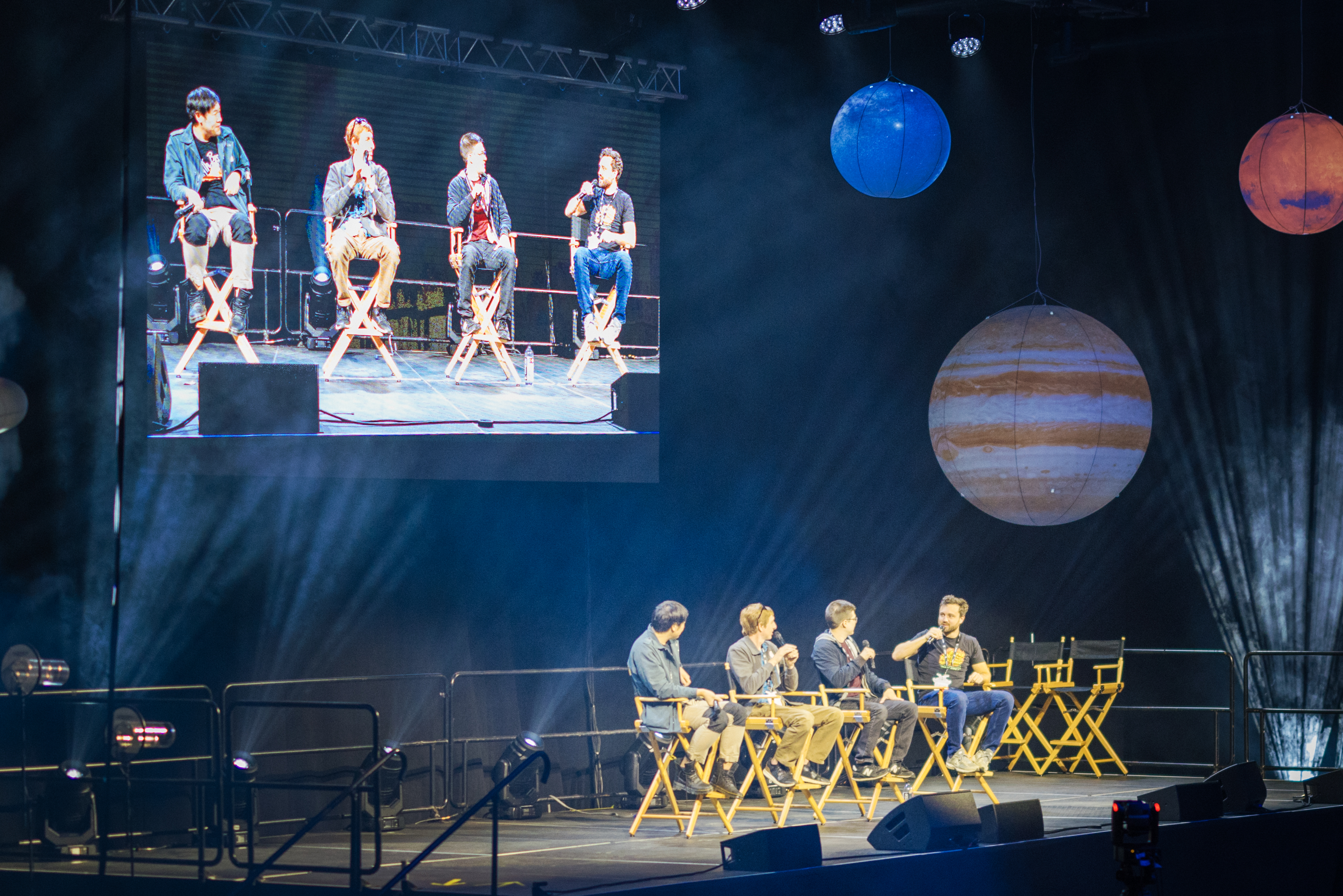
William Osman chats with featured creators during a panel

The event showcases a variety of technology projects, including unconventional and experimental designs, such as a U-Haul truck converted into a massive camera, a musical Tesla coil performance, and a drivable bunk bed. These exhibitions are aimed at engaging attendees with interactive exhibits and demonstrations.

=== Panels and workshops ===
Open Sauce features a series of panels and workshops led by individuals from the science and technology sectors. Speakers have included Adam Savage of MythBusters fame and former NASA engineer Mark Rober. Topics often cover advancements in technology, practical engineering challenges, and career advice in the STEM fields.

=== Industry Day ===
Introduced in 2024, Industry Day precedes the main event and includes panels and discussions with leaders from major companies and startups.

== Notable participants ==
- Adam Savage – American special effects designer, co-host of the show MythBusters
- Mark Rober – American engineer and science YouTuber
- Colin Furze – British engineer and inventor YouTuber
- Michael Reeves – American programmer and inventor YouTuber
- NileRed – Canadian science YouTuber
- DougDoug – American internet personality
- ElectroBOOM – Electrical engineer and Iranian-Canadian science YouTuber
- Alex Hirsch – Creator of the animated television series Gravity Falls

=== Complete creator list ===
- 2023 Featured Creator List – Archived
- 2024 Featured Creator List – Archived
- 2025 Featured Creator List
- 2026 Featured Creator List

=== Industry partners ===
- YouTube
- Arm
- Crunch Labs – Mark Rober's company
- Framework
- DigiKey
- Arduino
- General Motors
- Fujifilm
- Prusa Research
- Raspberry Pi
- Anthropic

== Gallery ==
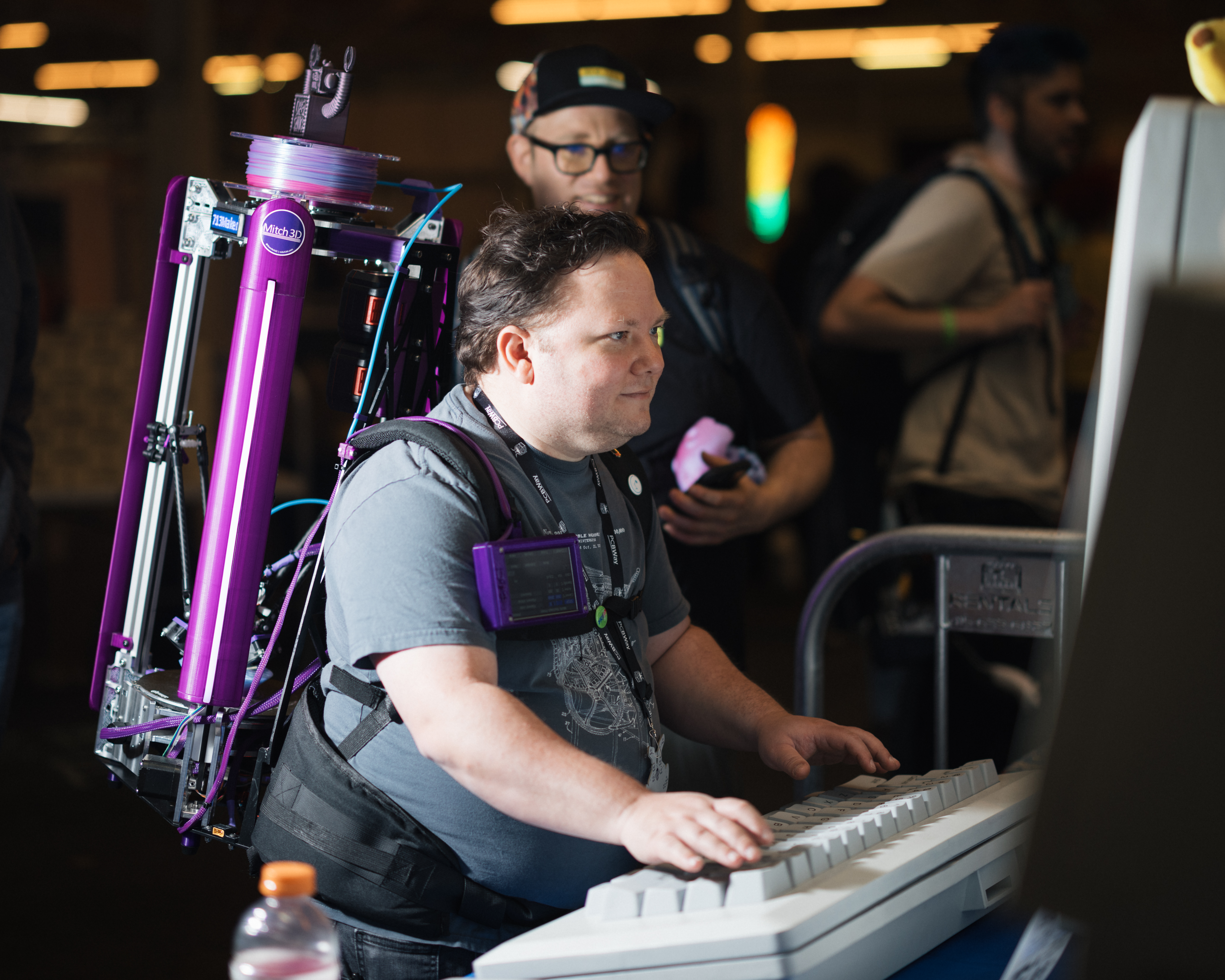
A man wears a back-mounted 3D printer while operating a 237% scale model of a 1986 Macintosh Plus at Open Sauce

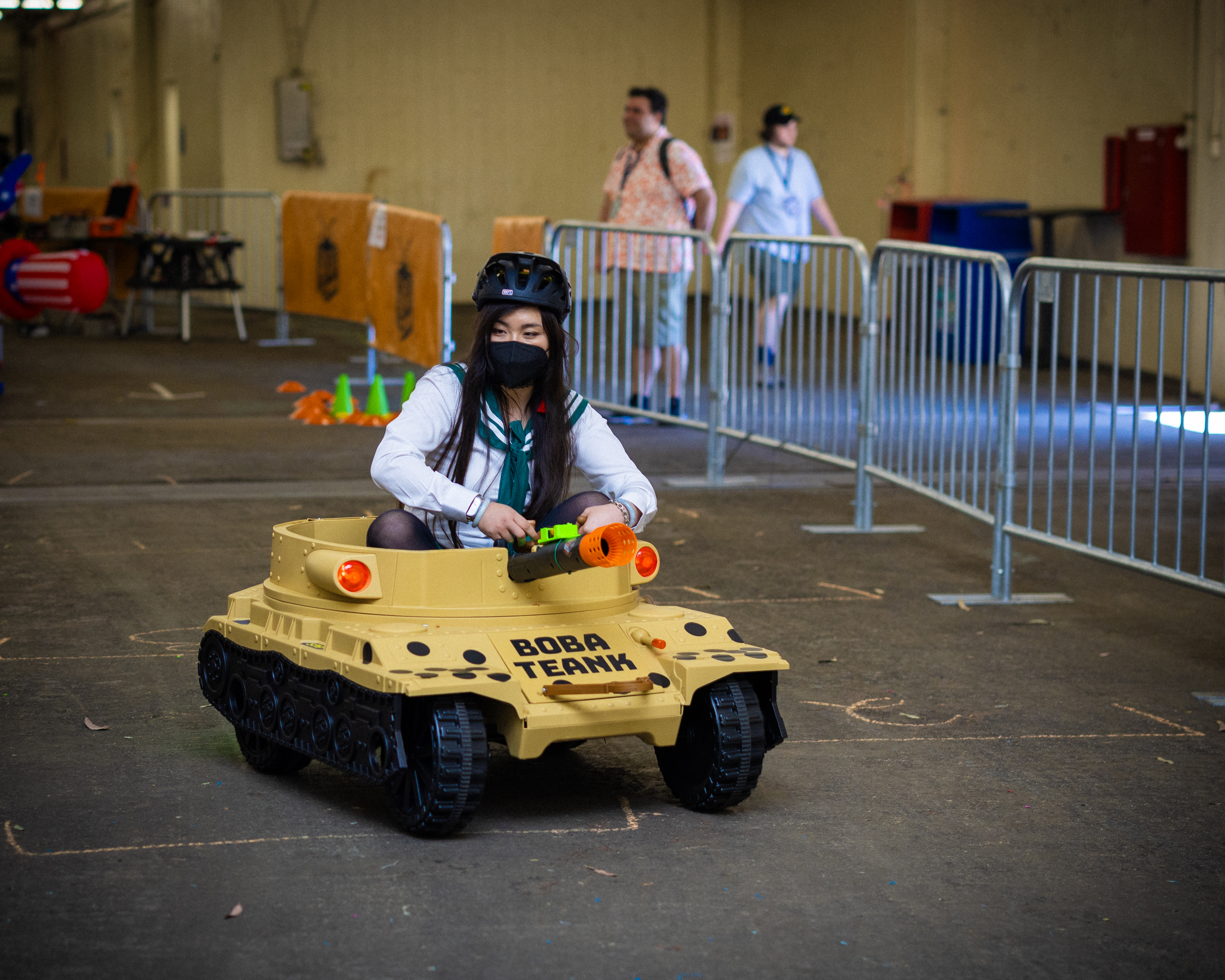
A competitor in a Power Wheels racing event at Open Sauce

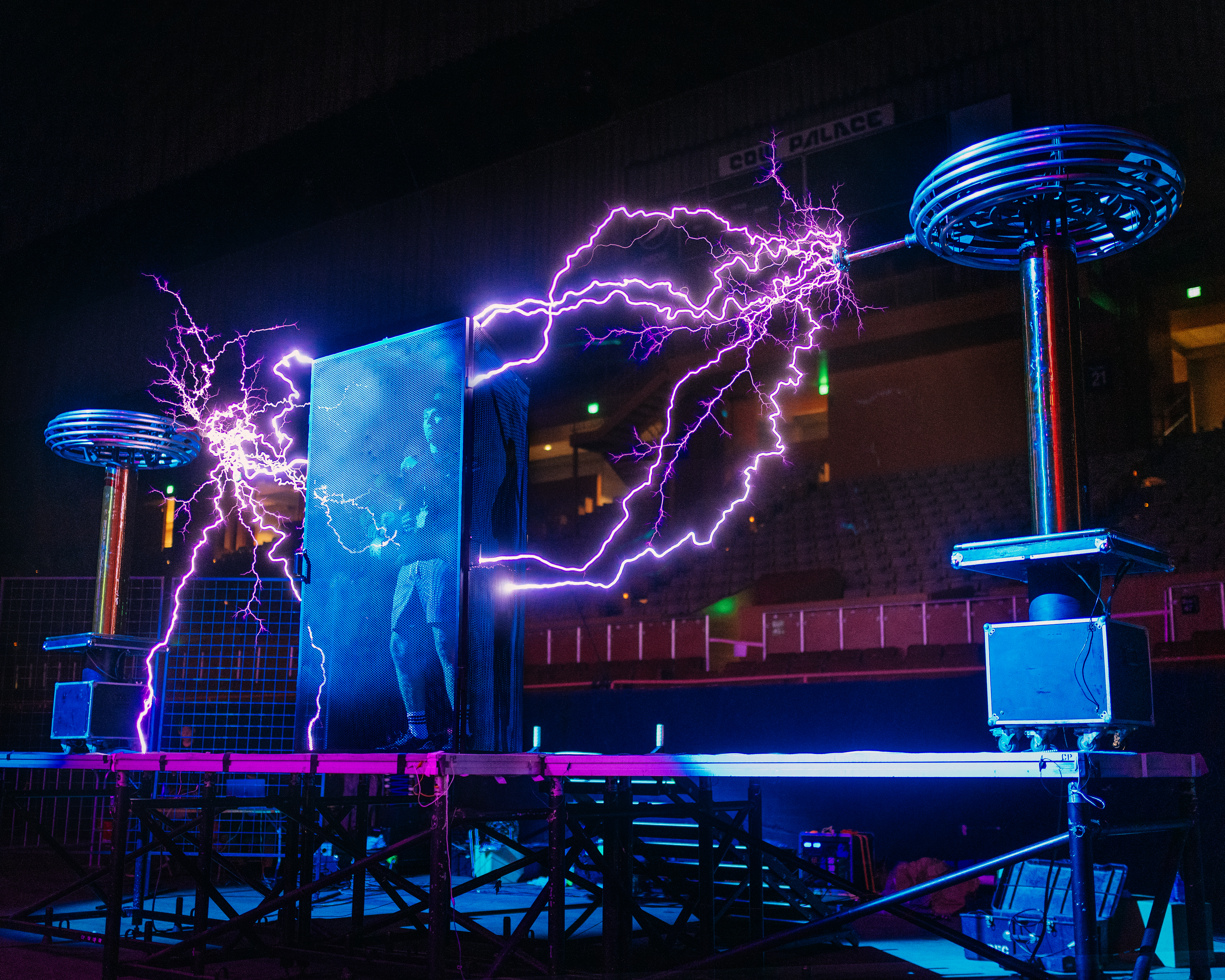
A musical Tesla coil performance takes place at Open Sauce

== See also ==
- VidCon
- Maker Faire
- Silicon Valley
