= Shu Uchida =

Japanese voice actress (born 1996)

- 内田 秀
- Born: May 24, 1996 (age 30); Japan
- Other name: ShuShu
- Occupation: Voice actress
- Years active: 2016–present
- Agents: LINK PLAN (2016–2020) CaliCom (2020–2022); Just Pro (2022–present)
- Height: 157 cm (5 ft 2 in)

YouTube information
- Channel: ShuTube・ᴥ・
- Years active: 2021–present
- Genre: Culture
- Subscribers: 51 thousand
- Views: 2.22 million
- Last updated: 1 July 2025
- Website: uchida-shu.com

Shu Uchida (内田 秀, Uchida Shū; born May 24, 1996) is a Japanese-Australian voice actress. She debuted in 2016 as the voice of Warspite, a character from the Kantai Collection series.

== Early life ==
Shu Uchida was born in Japan and was raised in Sydney, Australia from the age of 2, living there up until the age of 18. At that time, she watched Bleach, Naruto, etc. with her sister. Many of these anime were sent by her grandparents who lived in Japan.

Impressed by some other famous voice actors like Romi Park and Tetsuya Kakihara, she wanted to be a voice actress when she was in primary school. However, at that time, her Japanese was not fluent enough, so her parents were opposed to her becoming a voice actress. In high school, she took part-time jobs and started to book flights to Japan for voice acting auditions. Although her parents wanted her to finish school, she skipped university and moved to Japan alone to pursue voice acting in 2014.

== Career ==
=== 2014-present ===
She joined the Pro-Fit voice actor school and started her two years training to become a voice actor in 2014. She got her first job and debuted as Warspite, a game character from Kantai Collection, before graduating from the school in 2016.

After graduating from Pro-Fit voice actor school, she was affiliated with LINK PLAN, a subsidiary of Pro-Fit.

On September 30, 2020, she left LINK PLAN with Mayu Sagara, her friend at the same agency. The next day, October 1, she announced to be affiliated with a new artist management department "CaliCom" from StrayCats.

On February 1, 2021, she started her YouTube channel "ShuTube". The content of the channel is mainly about the culture in Japan and Australia.

She is proficient in English and got a 990 full score upon her first attempt on TOEIC in 2021. As she has some American English speaking characters, which is different to her native Australian English, she studied hard on the English pronunciation.

== Personal life ==
She likes reading, and making sweets. She also possesses a profound affection for animals, with a particular fondness for the Samoyed dog. In the past, she cared for a hamster named Rira and a Samoyed dog named Mooni, and presently, she is nurturing a Pomeranian dog named Papiko.

Her motto is "Open the door, it may lead you to someplace never expected."

== Works ==
=== Television animation ===
Year	Title	Role	Source
2017	Alice & Zoroku	Cleo, Hatori Shikishima	
2018	Fate/EXTRA Last Encore	Young Girl Police Officer	
2018	Citrus	Station Announcement	
2018	Ms. Koizumi Loves Ramen Noodles	Train Announcement	
2018	Tada Never Falls in Love	Child, Tourist	
2018	Doraemon	Search antenna, Dog, Cat, Girl, Kuro	
2018	Last Period	Yumiru	
2018	Crayon Shin-chan		
2018	Chio's School Road	Girl, Marina	
2018	Asobi Asobase	Fujiwara	
2018	Million Arthur	Female customer, Female	
2019	BanG Dream!	Freshman	
2019	A Certain Magical Index III	Russian Pilot	
2019	Magical Girl Spec-Ops Asuka	Operator C	
2019	How Heavy Are the Dumbbells You Lift?	Crystal Garson, Pool Visitor	
2020	Toilet-Bound Hanako-kun	English tape sound	
2020	Uzaki-chan Wants to Hang Out!	Student A	
2020	Arad Senki: The Wheel of Reversal	Xiaofang	
2020	I'm Standing on a Million Lives	Female Student, Maki	
2021	Re-Main	Anna	
2021	PuraOre! Pride of Orange	Machiko Sugawara	
2022	Love Live! Nijigasaki High School Idol Club 2nd Season	Mia Taylor	
2022	Shine Post	Una, Fan	
2022	KanColle: Let's Meet at Sea	Mikura	
2023	Nijiyon Animation	Mia Taylor	
2023	D4DJ All Mix	Laura Bradley	
2023	Technoroid Overmind	Announcer	
2024	Highspeed Etoile	Akari Kuzuryū	
2024	Nintama Rantarō	Cat	
2024	Chiikawa	Gray's child	
2024	Mayonaka Punch	Aya	
2024	The Do-Over Damsel Conquers the Dragon Emperor	Jill Cervel	
2025	The Too-Perfect Saint: Tossed Aside by My Fiancé and Sold to Another Kingdom	Grace Martilas	
2025	Cultural Exchange with a Game Centre Girl	Narration, Student A, Classmate (Glasses-chan)	
2025	Tougen Anki	Jin Kougasaki (young)	
2027	Nabe ni Tama o Ukenagara	Juntarō (female)	

=== Film animation ===
Year	Title	Role	Source
2019	Crayon Shin-chan: Honeymoon Hurricane ~The Lost Hiroshi~	Kamenzoku	
2021	Crayon Shin-chan: Shrouded in Mystery! The Flowers of Tenkazu Academy	Earnest Schoolgirl	

=== Game ===
Year	Title	Role	Source
2016	Kantai Collection	Warspite, Ark Royal, Gambier Bay, Perth, Mikura	
2017	The Expression Amrilato	Ruka Rozen E	
2018	CHRONO MA:GIA	Lilia	
2019	Itsuka no Memorajo	Ruka Rozen E	
2019	Magia Record	Shizuka Tokime	
2019	Touhou Cannonball	Imaizumi Kagerou	
2019	ASH ARMS	T-77 MGMC, BV P.194	
2020	Time Refrain	Frigg, Nika, Salamander	
2020	Love Live! School Idol Festival All Stars	Mia Taylor	
2022	Heaven Burns Red	Nanami Nanase	
2023	Untitled Magical Girl	Yuna Tojo	
2023	Reverse: 1999	Sonetto	
2026	Arknights: Endfield	Akekuri (English voice)	

=== Drama CD ===
- YomeKura (2017, Leia August)
- Maid in dream ~Princess and Maid's sweet life~ (2021, シーナ・プブレリウム)

=== Digital comic ===
- A love letter for the marching puppy (2019, Miharu Aifune)
- Nijiyon Series 4 (2021, Mia Taylor)

=== Radio ===
- Lumina Charis's Lumi curriculum!（2017–2020, HiBiKi Radio Station）
- Radio "The Expression Amrilato" ~Yuri Yuri Juliamo~（2017, Onsen (Radio)※）

=== Web shows ===
- Shu Uchida's It's Shu Time (2019–2020, Niconico Live, YouTube)
- Let's have a talk in Shu Uchida's Café?（2021 – , Niconico Live）

=== TV ===
- Anime Song Premium (2019 – 2021, NHK BS Premium) – Assistant

=== Narration ===
- Megalith IT Alliance (December, 2016– )
- C3 AFA Singapore 2018
- Anime Song Premium (April 21, 2019)

=== Podcast ===
- Trash Taste Season 2 No. 58
- ProZD + Pals Episode 52

=== Other ===
- Boku Otter (designer)
- English Learning App "Rei's English Words" (2021–, English Part)
