= Nabe ni Tama o Ukenagara =

Japanese manga series

- First wideban volume cover

鍋に弾丸を受けながら
- Genre: Cooking; Non-fiction
- Manga
- Written by: Juntarō Aoki
- Illustrated by: Shin Moriyama
- Published by: Kadokawa Shoten
- Imprint: Kadokawa Comics A
- Magazine: Comic Newtype
- Original run: May 28, 2021 – present
- Volumes: 5
- Manga

Nabe ni Tama o Ukenagara Transit
- Written by: Juntarō Aoki
- Illustrated by: Hirota Takahara
- Published by: Kadokawa Shoten
- Magazine: Comic Newtype
- Original run: March 20, 2026 – present
- Anime television series
- Directed by: Masahiro Hiraoka
- Written by: Susumu Yamakawa
- Music by: Yoshihide Otomo
- Studio: J.C.Staff
- Original network: Nippon TV, ytv, BS NTV, AT-X
- Original run: January 2027 – scheduled

Nabe ni Tama o Ukenagara (鍋に弾丸を受けながら) is a Japanese manga series written by Juntarō Aoki and illustrated by Shin Moriyama. It began serialization on Kadokawa Shoten's Comic Newtype website in May 2021. An anime television series adaptation produced by J.C.Staff is set to premiere in January 2027.

== Synopsis ==
The series is centered around the author's travels to various different countries to eat food in dangerous zones. It also features all the characters being portrayed as women, due to the author's "overdose of 2D content" hampering his brain.

== Characters ==
Juntarō (ジュンタロー)
Voiced by: Shunsuke Takeuchi (voice comic), Shu Uchida (anime, female), Masaaki Mizunaka (anime, male)
Friend K (友人K, Yūjin K)
Voiced by: Jouji Nakata (voice comic)
Pierrot (ピエロ, Piero)
Voiced by: Atsushi Kosaka (voice comic)
Mendoza (メンドーサ, Mendosa)
Voiced by: Shinnosuke Ogami (voice comic)

== Media ==
=== Manga ===
Written by Juntarō Aoki and illustrated by Shin Moriyama, Nabe ni Tama o Ukenagara began serialization on Kadokawa Shoten's Comic Newtype website on May 28, 2021. Its chapters have been compiled into five wideban volumes as of October 2024.

A spin-off, titled Nabe ni Tama o Ukenagara Transit, written by Aoki and illustrated by Hirota Takahara, began serialization on the same website on March 20, 2026.

==== Volumes ====
No.	Release date	ISBN
1	January 8, 2022	978-4-04-112097-2
2	August 10, 2022	978-4-04-112697-4
3	March 10, 2023	978-4-04-113487-0
4	December 11, 2023	978-4-04-114270-7
5	October 10, 2024	978-4-04-115345-1

==== Nabe ni Tama o Ukenagara Transit ====
No.	Release date	ISBN
1	January 8, 2027	978-4-04-972362-5

=== Anime ===
An anime television series adaptation was announced on June 25, 2026. The series will be produced by J.C.Staff and directed by Masahiro Hiraoka, with Susumu Yamakawa handling series composition, Natsuki Ōyama designing the characters, and Yoshihide Otomo composing the music. It is set to premiere in January 2027 on Nippon TV and other networks.

=== Other ===
In commemoration of the release of the series' first volume, a voice comic adaptation was uploaded to the Kadokawa Anime YouTube channel on January 8, 2022. The voice comic featured performances from Shunsuke Takeuchi and Jouji Nakata.

== Reception ==
The series was nominated for the eighth and ninth Next Manga Awards in the web category in 2022 and 2023 respectively. The series was ranked eighteenth in the 2023 edition of Takarajimasha's Kono Manga ga Sugoi! guidebook list of the best manga for male readers.
