= Sharla Hinskens =

Canadian YouTuber based in Japan

Sharla
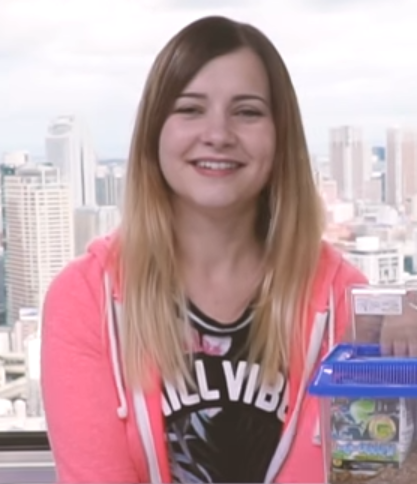
- Born: April 23, 1986 (age 40)
- Occupation: YouTuber
- Organization: Sekai Studios
- Spouse: Chris Broad (m. 2025)

YouTube information
- Channel: Sharla
- Years active: 2011–present
- Genre: Vlog
- Subscribers: 789 thousand
- Views: 127 million
- Last updated: 1 November 2026

Sharla Katalin Hinskens (born April 23, 1986), also known as Sharmeleon ("evolved" from Sharmander upon receiving 500,000 subscribers in March 2020) and Sharla in Japan, is a Canadian YouTuber who has been vlogging about her experiences in Japan since 2011.

== Biography ==
Sharla, who solely uses her first name in her career as a YouTuber, grew up in Victoria, British Columbia. Her paternal grandparents were Dutch, her maternal grandfather was Hungarian, and her maternal grandmother was English. She was brought up in a vegetarian household but did occasionally eat meat at her grandparents' house. Over her life, she had followed pescatarian and vegan diets but is currently following a flexible diet.

She first visited Japan at age 17 as an exchange student between the sister cities Victoria and Morioka. She worked in Tokyo at age 19 as an English teacher, and returned to Canada in 2010. When the 2011 Tōhoku earthquake hit, she moved back to Japan, due to stress from being in Canada and being far away from her friends. Around this time she started vlogging her daily life. Her videos, including topics in which she discusses what she likes about Japan, were well received with foreign viewers interested in the country.

On June 18, 2018, she announced her marriage to a Korean man, who wished to remain anonymous on YouTube and had been an alumnus of Japan university, after a seven-year relationship. They moved to his native Seoul where Sharla continued to vlog about her life there, although she continued to visit Japan. On March 5, 2019, Sharla announced her separation from her husband, eventually divorcing, and her intention to move back to Japan. She cited difficulties in living in an environment where she did not speak enough of the language in her current mental state and Canada not being exciting enough in this stage of her life.

In September 2020, she started Neko Neko Post, a service to sell fancy Japanese stationery, of which she herself is a fan, to overseas customers in collaboration with friends.

In August 2022 she and English YouTuber Chris Broad announced their relationship in two separate videos on their respective channels. On February 14, 2023, Chris and Sharla announced their engagement, with the proposal happening at Durdle Door in Dorset, England.

She has translated the films Shin Godzilla (2016) and Terra Formars (2016) for English subtitles, and she had also served as a dialogue coach assistant. Since 2018, she has collaborated with Chris Broad and participated in his series Journey Across Japan. She has also partnered with local governments and organizations to promote local specialties.
