= The Expression Amrilato =

2017 visual novel game

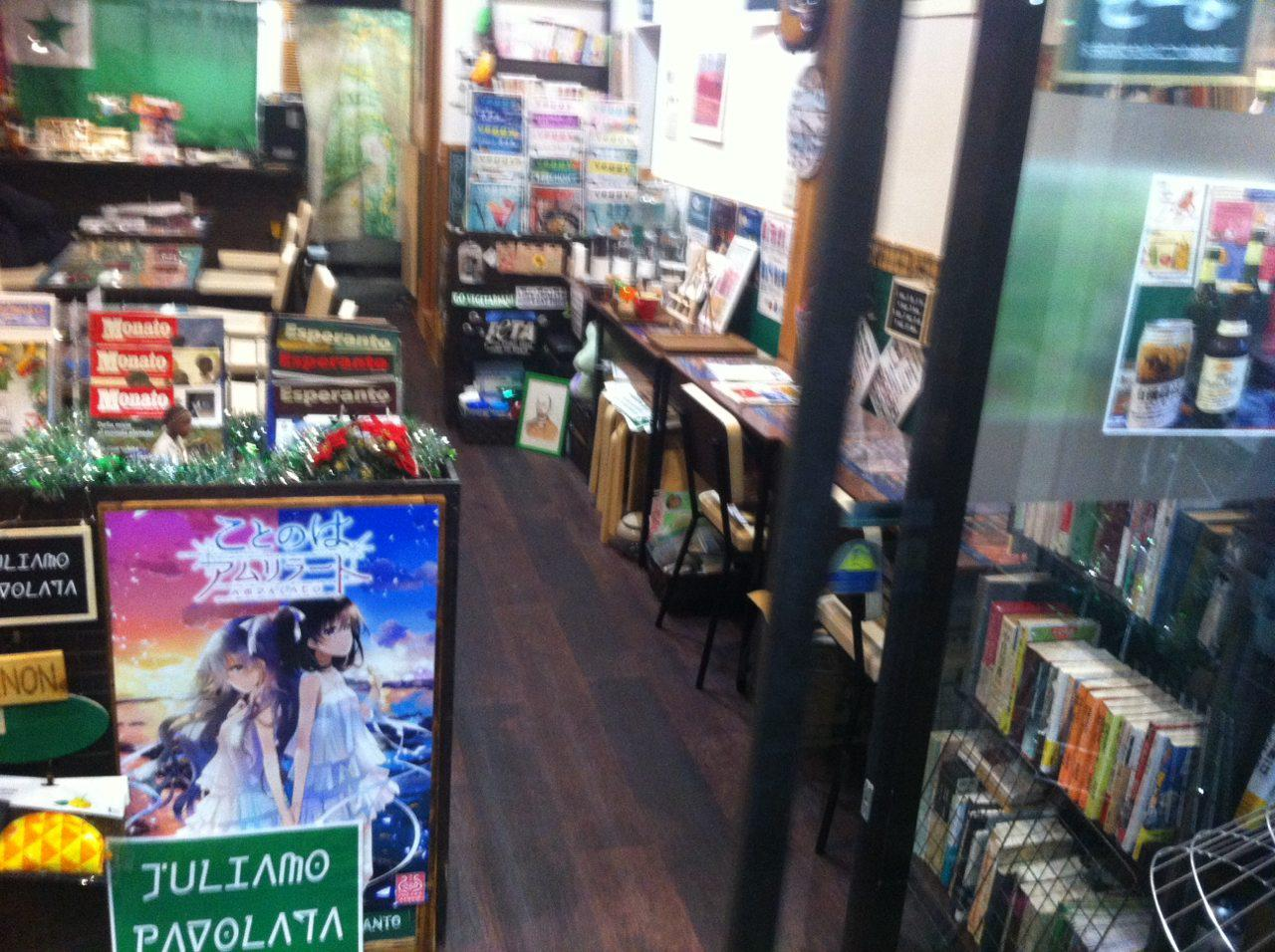
- Esperanto: Vegan Esperanto Café SOJO, in Tokyo, Japan

ことのはアムリラート (Kotonoha Amurirāto)
- Genre: Yuri, Isekai, Education
- Video game
- Developer: SukeraSparo
- Publisher: SukeraSparo; Hublots (Android, iOS); MangaGamer (Windows)
- Genre: Bishōjo game, Visual novel
- Platform: Windows, Android, iOS
- Released: JP: August 25, 2017 (Windows); JP: December 22, 2017 (Android); JP: February 16, 2018 (iOS); WW: June 13, 2019 (Windows)
- Video game

Itsuka no Memoraĵo
- Developer: SukeraSparo
- Publisher: SukeraSparo; MangaGamer (Windows)
- Genre: Bishōjo game, Visual novel
- Platform: Windows
- Released: JP: March 15, 2019 (Windows); WW: July 15, 2021 (Windows)

The Expression Amrilato, known in Japan as Kotonoha Amrilato (ことのはアムリラート, Kotonoha Amurirāto; lit. The Verbal Love Relationship), is a Japanese bishōjo visual novel developed by SukeraSparo in 2017. The game contains text in the international language Esperanto, which the game calls Juliamo. To advance, players need to learn Esperanto as they play.

The Japanese Esperanto Institute has collaborated with the developer SukeraSparo to translate Japanese phrases to Esperanto.

The developer's name is a coined word which is a translation of the Japanese word taiyaki in Esperanto: sukera (sugar) and sparo (sparidae, a species of fish).

A sequel called Distant Memoraĵo, known in Japan as Itsuka no Memorajxo ~Kotonoha Amrilato~ was released on 15 July 2021.

== Plot ==
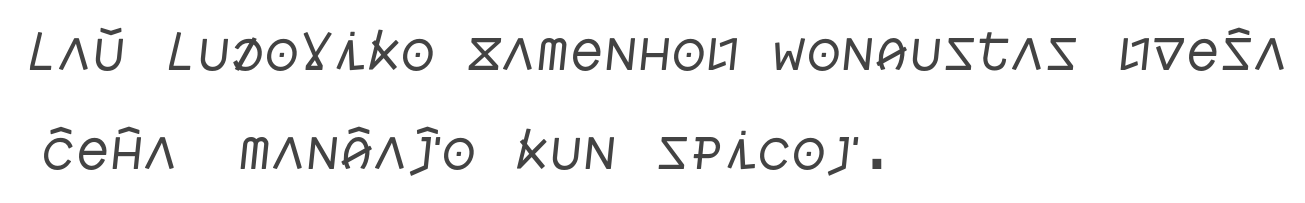
An Esperanto pangram showing all the characters of the Juliamo alphabet

A girl named Rin Takatō suddenly gets lost in another world, where no one speaks her language, Japanese, and all signs are in a foreign language, called Juliamo. Rin is in despair because of the language barrier, but she meets Ruka who helps her and takes her home. Meanwhile, Rin learns Juliamo and gradually draws closer emotionally to Ruka.

== Characters ==
Rin Takatō (高遠 凛, Takatō Rin; Esperanto: Takatoo Rin)
Voiced by: Juri Nagatsuma
Ruka E. Rozen (ルカ・ローゼン・E, Ruka Rōzen Ē)
Voiced by: Shū Uchida
Rei Arbaro (レイ・アルバーロ, Rei Arubāro)
Voiced by: Sarah Emi Bridcutt
