= William Osman =

American YouTuber (born 1991)

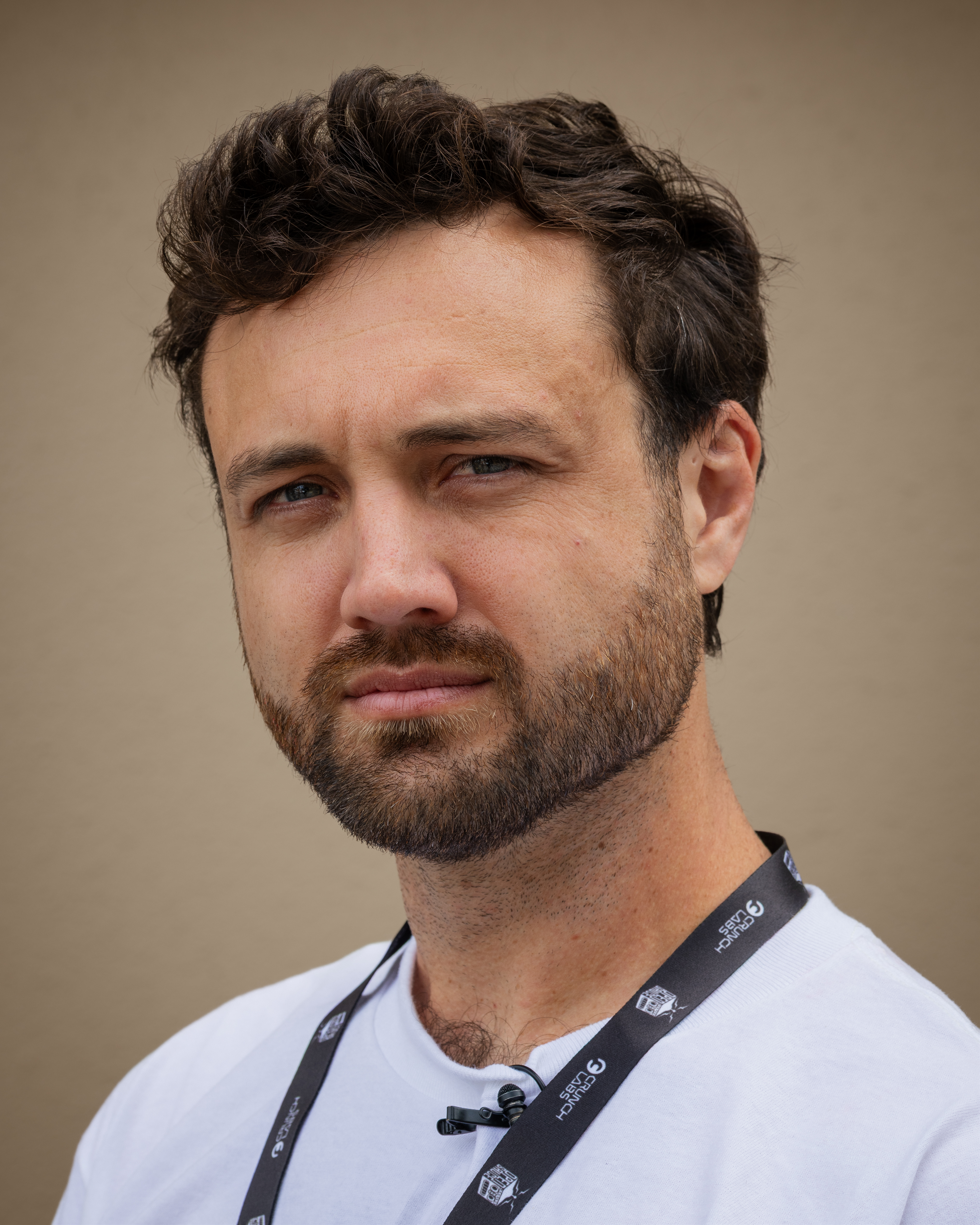
- Osman in 2026
- Education: California State University, Northridge (BS)
- Occupations: YouTuber, Engineer

YouTube information
- Channel: William Osman
- Years active: 2008–present
- Genre: Maker
- Subscribers: 3.02 million
- Views: 474 million
- Last updated: April 23, 2026
- Website: williamosman.com

William Osman is an American YouTuber and engineer based in Ventura, California. He makes videos about science and robots. He has gone viral for a 2017 video featuring a laser cut sculpture of Vin Diesel made of a ham and cheese sandwich and a 2021 video featuring a homemade X-ray machine. His other videos include egg drop competitions, including one against U.S. Navy sailors as part of a recruitment campaign. He founded Open Sauce, a maker and creator convention, in 2023.

== Career ==
Osman created his YouTube channel on November 25, 2013. He began creating YouTube videos with his cameraman and editor John "CameraManJohn" Willner in high school. The majority of his early videos included his homemade laser cutter named "RetinaSmelter9000". He used the machine to test whether materials could be laser-cut, such as a video attempting to cut ice.

In March 2017, Osman made a video based on a request from a viewer called Restroom Sounds, who said, "Please sculpt a bust of Vin Diesel using laser-cut cross-sections of laser-sliced ham." He made a ham and cheese sandwich laser-cut to depict Diesel with a large bust, which he designed using Autodesk Maya and Autodesk Fusion and assembled with 90 slices of meat. He called the project, "one of the worst things I have ever done, like, in my life," and apologized to Diesel. The video received over 100,000 views within two days.

On Thanksgiving 2017, Osman released videos making a literal "gravy train" system to deliver gravy and laser-cutting a turkey. In February 2018, he collaborated with Simone Giertz on a video in which Osman modified Giertz's Comuta-Car to function as a computer mouse. Later that year, he collaborated on a video by Mark Rober, sponsored by Volkswagen, in which the two attempted to power a car using a lemon battery made from 1,232 lemons, followed by the human power of a group of children, ultimately using solar power.

Osman's appearance on the U.S. Navy recruiting campaign Sailor Vs.

In August 2019, Osman partnered with the U.S. Navy for part of its Sailor Vs. series, its first recruiting campaign to feature influencers. The Navy invited three STEM YouTubers to highlight technical roles and equipment. Osman was invited aboard the USS Theodore Roosevelt to compete in an egg drop competition against a pair of sailors from a cybersecurity team.

In a 2020 video, Osman purchased a BattleBots robot nicknamed Red Devil and used it to destroy objects. He made another video in response to negative comments about his destructive treatment of the robot, in which he said that the robot was already old and that he knew how to undo damage to it. He worked on Mr. Beast's 2021 recreation of Squid Game, designing a replica turret gun using motion detection to trigger custom blood squibs. He was a featured creator at VidCon 2021.

In August 2021, Osman made a video building an X-ray machine and criticizing the American for-profit healthcare system. Having been charged nearly $70,000, including $8,500 out-of-pocket, for a hospital visit, he said, "I’m a slave to medical debt now. I have to sell all my things, I have to sell my friends’ belongings." He created his X-ray machine for a few hundred dollars using a 60 kilovolt power supply, an X-ray vacuum tube, Geiger counters, and a sheet of lead. He called it, "the most dangerous contraption I have ever built". The video went viral on multiple social media platforms.

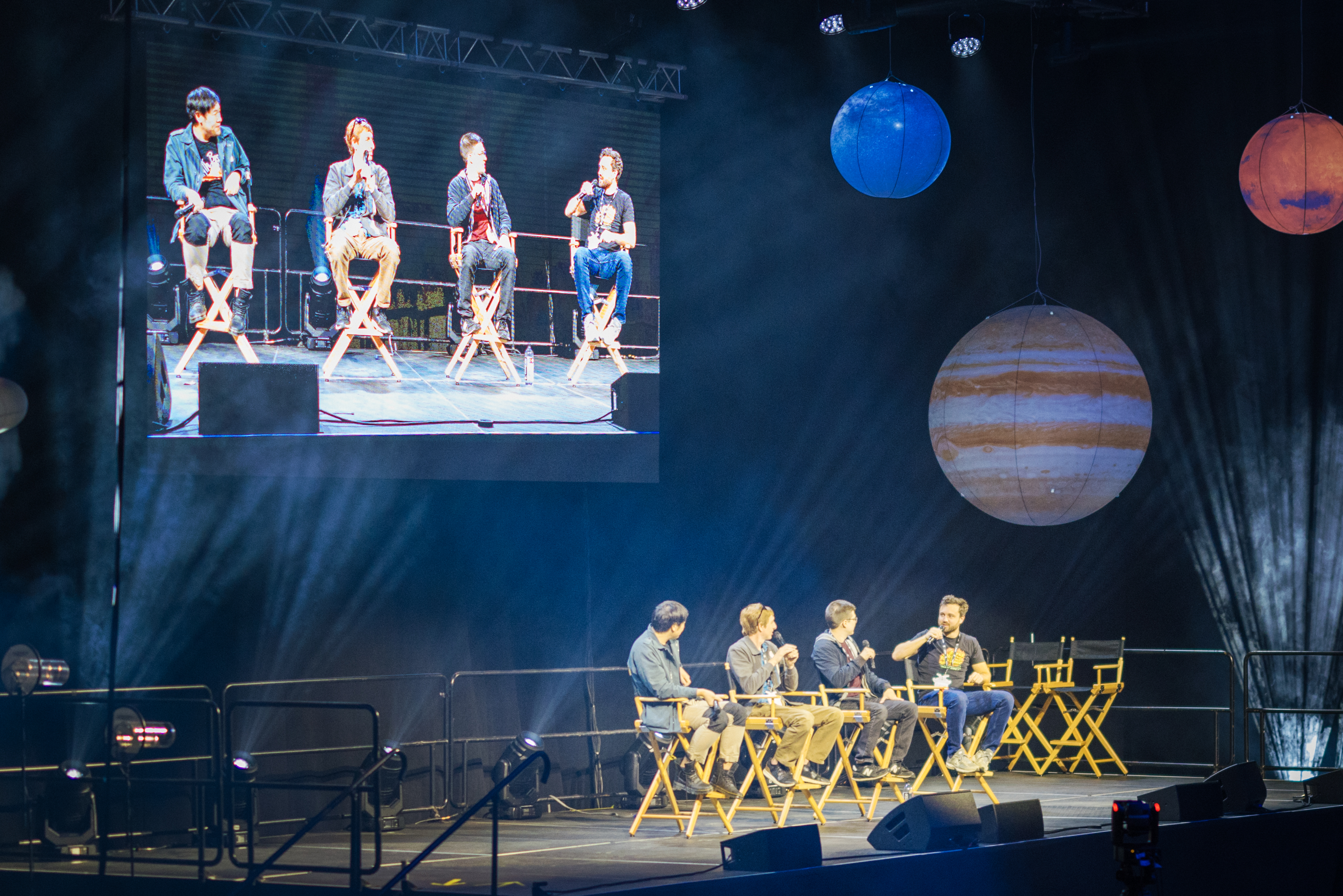
Osman and other creators in a panel at Open Sauce 2024

In March 2023, Osman announced Open Sauce, a creator and maker convention inspired by Maker Faire and VidCon. He founded the convention alongside talent managers David Seelos and Ian Dokie. It was held the following June at Pier 35 in the Embarcadero in San Francisco. The 2024 edition took place from June 14 to June 16 at the Cow Palace near San Francisco. In 2024, he signed with Seelos's management firm, Underscore Talent.

== Style ==
Osman is a mechanical and electrical engineer whose videos involve science, robotics, and artificial intelligence. He has described his YouTube videos as, "dubious quality, questionable integrity and unethical delivery". He has collaborated with several YouTubers and made several egg drop competition videos.

== Personal life ==
William Osman married his wife, Chelsea in 2016. In early December 2017, the couple lost their home in Ventura, California in the Thomas Fire. Their friend started a GoFundMe account to help pay for the damages. Osman posted a YouTube video about the house fire on December 5, 2017, and it quickly went viral. The GoFundMe campaign had a goal of $10,000, but surpassed $120,000 from more than 6,300 donors in 20 hours.

Osman has stated in a video on his second channel that he has attention deficit hyperactivity disorder.
