= Chris Broad (YouTuber) =

English YouTuber and filmmaker (born 1990)

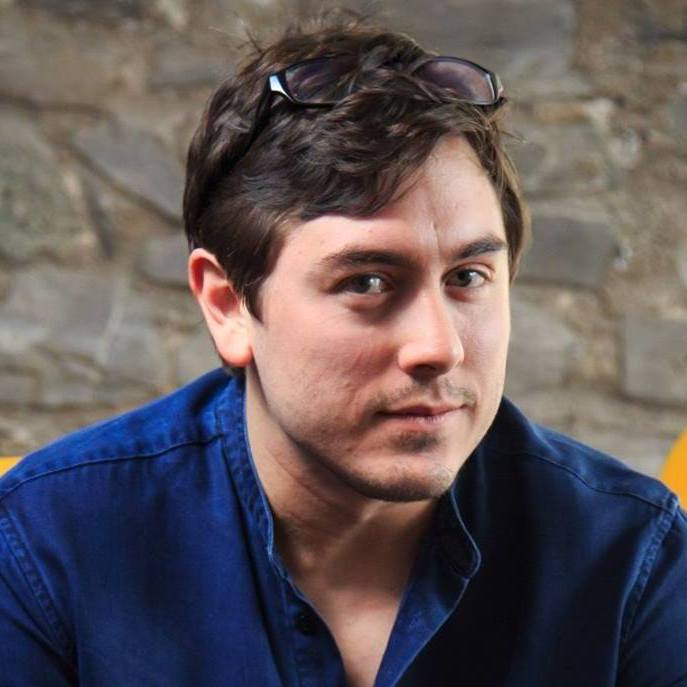
- Broad in 2020
- Born: 21 April 1990 (age 36); Maidstone, England
- Occupations: YouTuber; documentary filmmaker; podcaster; writer
- Years active: 2012–present
- Spouse: Sharla Hinskens (m. 2025)

YouTube information
- Channel: Abroad in Japan
- Genres: Culture; food; travel
- Subscribers: 3.29 million
- Views: 616 million
- Last updated: 1 November 2026

Chris Broad (born 21 April 1990) is an English YouTuber, documentary filmmaker, podcaster, and writer. He is best known for his YouTube channel Abroad in Japan, where he creates videos about Japanese culture, food, and travel, primarily in the Tōhoku region.

== Early life ==
Broad was born in Maidstone on 21 April 1990. His interest in filmmaking began at the age of eight, when he filmed his aunt's wedding in Vancouver at the behest of his grandfather, who could not travel from England to attend it. He briefly appeared on Robot Wars, where he and his father used their robot Killertron. He studied English and business at the University of Kent from 2009 to 2012. While there, he developed an interest in Japanese culture. After graduating, he worked in the office of an energy company and as a porter at Leeds Castle.

== Career ==
=== YouTube ===
In 2011, Broad successfully applied to be an assistant language teacher on the JET Programme, which relocated him the following year to Sakata, Yamagata; he then began creating videos about his experience as a foreigner in the rural Tōhoku region. One of his first videos to gain widespread attention was a review of McDonald's limited edition McChoco Potatoes (chips covered in double chocolate sauce) which were available only in Japan. Other subjects of his early videos included love hotels, driving in Japan, and the Japanese habit of eating KFC every Christmas. He left the JET Programme after three years and moved to Sendai to advance his YouTube career. He began to create more travel videos as his channel grew, including a video describing a trip to Aomori, where he visited the city's Nebuta museum, and another in which he travelled to Hokkaido with his friend and frequent collaborator Natsuki Aso.

On 29 August 2017, Broad was visiting a town in Aomori Prefecture near the Shirakami-Sanchi wilderness area when he was woken by the J-Alert being triggered by the North Korean August 2017 missile launch over Japan. He posted a video in which he joked about the rudeness of conducting such a test so early in the morning, criticised the regime of North Korean dictator Kim Jong-un, and disparaged foreigners who legitimise North Korea by visiting it; the video quickly trended on the day of its release. It attracted national attention in Japan, leading to Broad being selected to represent the term "J-Alert" in Japan's annual Words of the Year event.

On 31 May 2018, Broad released the documentary film Natsuki: The Movie, which tells the story of his journey to Europe alongside Natsuki. That same year, he launched his Journey Across Japan series, featuring YouTubers such as The Anime Man and other friends as Broad cycles across Japan, documenting local customs and daily life along the way. A sequel to the series was produced in 2020, featuring The Anime Man and Natsuki on a road trip originating in Tokyo, primarily set in the Chūbu region, titled Journey Across Japan: Escape to Fuji. In early 2021, he began filming a third entry, titled Journey Across Japan: The Lost Islands with The Anime Man and Natsuki, which takes place in the region of Kyushu. In June 2021, he released the single "Too Much Volcano!" featuring The Anime Man and Natsuki on the iTunes Store and Spotify; the song and its accompanying music video were recorded during the production of The Lost Islands and centre around Mount Aso. The song peaked at No. 14 on the UK iTunes downloads chart on 22 June 2021.

In December 2021, Broad unveiled his new YouTube studio, constructed by the set design company Jiyuro and inspired by 1960s Japanese shopping arcades and the film Blade Runner (1982). The studio was damaged by the 2022 Fukushima earthquake.

=== Documentary work ===
Broad's YouTube channel features several documentary-style videos. In addition to the previously mentioned Natsuki: The Movie, Broad created a documentary focusing on the effects of the 2011 Tōhoku earthquake and tsunami on the citizens of Kesennuma and how they and external organisations worked to rebuild their city's image and livelihood. He expressed concern about the aversion to the area stemming from the Fukushima Daiichi nuclear disaster, which motivated him to create documentaries about the region, including one in development that will focus on the positive aspects of life in Fukushima.

In December 2019, Broad released a documentary interview with rock musician Hyde, capturing his performances at Zepp Tokyo. He revisited the disaster area in a second documentary in 2020, focusing on the region's recovery. YouTube CEO Susan Wojcicki praised his work, while the Cabinet of Japan commended him for his ability to capture "the heartbreaking sorrow of the disaster victims and the hopeful steps being taken towards recovery" in his documentaries.

== Podcast ==
Abroad in Japan
- Genre: Culture of Japan
- Language: English

Cast and voices
- Hosted by: Chris Broad; Pete Donaldson

Production
- Length: 30 minutes

Technical specifications
- Audio format: MP3

Publication
- Original release: 2018
- Updates: Weekly

Related
- Related shows: Trash Taste

Together with Pete Donaldson, Broad presents the twice-weekly Abroad in Japan podcast on Radio Stakhanov, focusing on Japanese culture, current events, and cuisine. Some recurring topics in the series include the Lotte soft serve, Coolish, and a pizza vending machine that once operated in Hiroshima. The pair also discuss Japan-related stories and questions submitted by their audience via email in a segment they call the Fax Machine, a jest towards the obsolete method of communication that remains commonly used in many Japanese workplaces.

== Other ventures ==
Broad spoke at a TEDx conference at Tohoku University, where he presented on the power of YouTube and encouraged the audience to share their experiences with the world through the platform. In 2017, Broad hosted a documentary about cats in Japanese culture called Cat Nation, where he (despite being allergic to cats) travelled throughout Japan to document cat-centered activities and places, such as visiting the Wakayama Electric Railway, where a cat named Tama became a tourist attraction after it was appointed the station master of Kishi Station.

Broad hosted an episode of Explore Regional Flavors: Visiting the Hidden Village, a documentary about Japan's local cuisine, which was broadcast on NHK World in August 2017. In 2022, he appeared in an interview with the Foreign Correspondents' Club of Japan and received an honorary one-year membership. In December 2022, he participated in a chess boxing match against PJ Brittain at the Mogul Chessboxing Championship, held at the Galen Center in Los Angeles.

In 2023, Broad published the autobiography Abroad in Japan: Ten Years in the Land of the Rising Sun. It received positive reviews and was a Sunday Times Bestseller in August.

After hosting a pop-up sake tasting bar in Kyoto for a week in 2023, Broad and Sharla "Sharmeleon" Hinskens opened a bar in Tokyo's Shibuya ward named Lost the following year.

== Charity work ==
In 2022, Broad and Japan-based Welsh voice actor Connor "CDawgVA" Colquhoun collaborated on an eight-day 750 km (470 mi) cyclethon across Hokkaido to raise funds for the Immune Deficiency Foundation. The event was streamed live on Twitch and raised over $310,000. This was followed in 2023 by a nine-day 900 km (560 mi) bike ride in Kyushu, which raised over $555,000; in 2024 by a two-week 1,000 km (620 mi) bike ride from Yamaguchi to Tokyo, raising over $1 million; and in 2025, raising just under $1.07 million.

== Personal life ==
In February 2023, Broad revealed that he was engaged to Canadian fellow YouTuber Sharla Hinskens. They moved to Tokyo together later that year. They got married in 2025.

== Work ==
=== Books ===
- Abroad in Japan (Penguin, 2023) ISBN 9781787637078
- Journey Across Japan (Penguin, 2026) ISBN 9780857508294

=== Discography ===
==== Singles ====
Singles by Abroad in Japan
Title	Year
"Too Much Volcano!" (featuring The Anime Man & Natsuki Aso)	2021
