= NileRed =

Canadian YouTuber

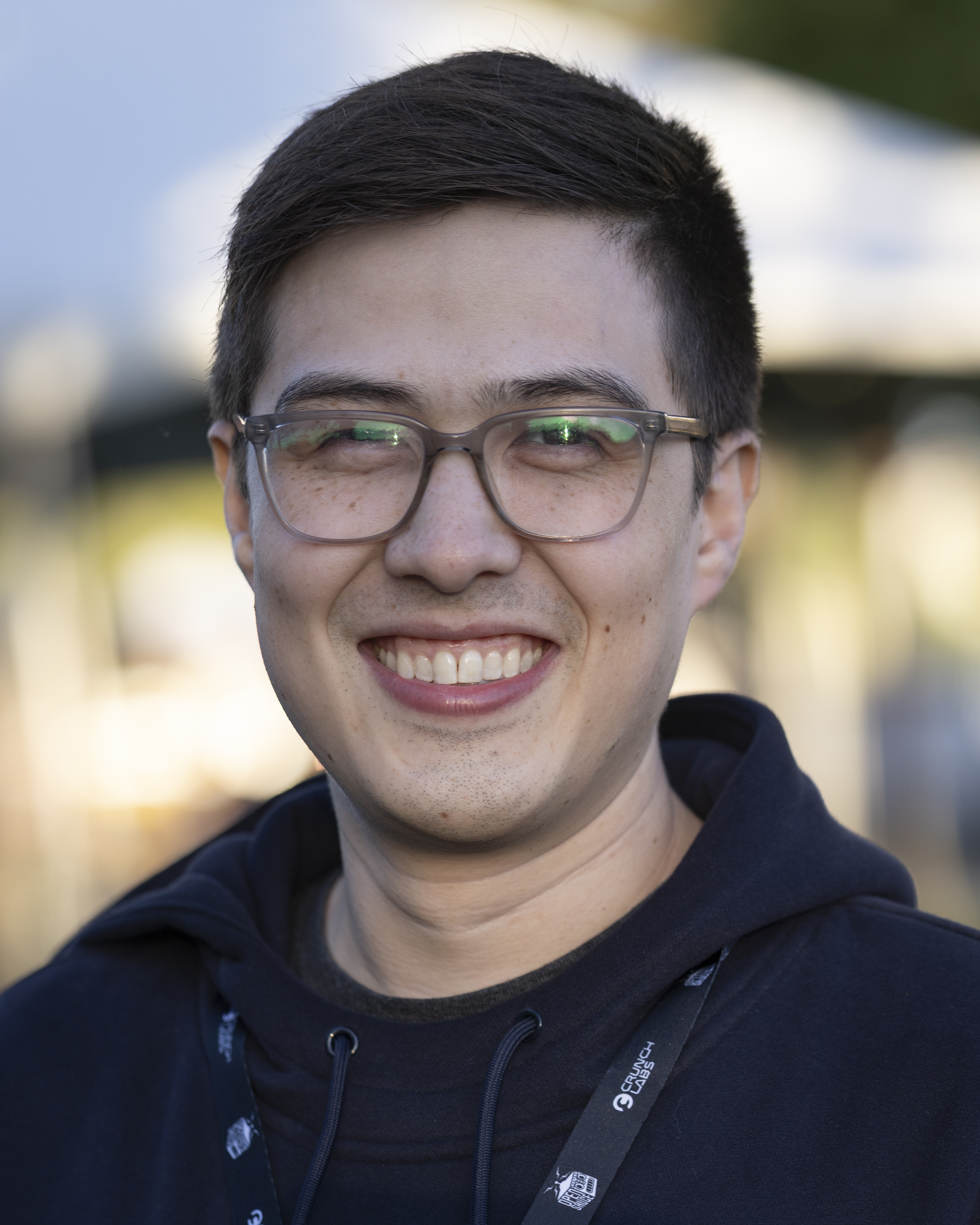
- Braun in 2026
- Born: Nigel Takashi Braun; 1991 (age 34–35); Montreal, Quebec, Canada
- Education: McGill University (BS)

YouTube information
- Channels: NileRed; NileRed 2; NileBlue
- Years active: 2014–present
- Genre: Educational entertainment
- Subscribers: 10.8 million (main channel); 4.57 million (NileRed 2); 3.38 million (NileBlue); 19.4 million (combined) (Note: Subscribers, broken down by channel: 10.7 million (NileRed) 4.57 million (NileRed 2) 3.38 million (NileBlue) 561,000 (NileRed Extra) 217,000 (NileRed en Español))
- Views: 4.52 billion (main channel); 6.06 million (NileRed 2); 476.66 million (NileBlue); 5.2 billion (combined) (Note: Views, broken down by channel: 4.52 billion (NileRed) 6.06 million (NileRed 2) 476.66 million (NileBlue) 133.48 million (NileRed Extra) 72.14 million (NileRed en Español))
- Last updated: April 3, 2026
- Website: nile.red

Nigel Takashi Braun, known professionally as NileRed, is a Canadian YouTuber and chemist known for his chemistry-related videos covering chemical reactions and compounds. He has a Bachelor of Science degree in biochemistry with a minor in pharmacology from McGill University.

== Early life ==
Nigel Takashi Braun was born in Montreal, Quebec in 1991, to Dorian George Braun, a sound engineer and former college professor, and Jody Kumiko Tanaka. His younger brother, Corey Seiji, helps manage his YouTube channel. Before starting a YouTube channel, Braun was a trained laboratory technician in an organic chemistry lab. He later began a master's degree program in chemistry at McGill, but left it to concentrate on the NileRed channel.

== Career ==
Braun had been making videos, mainly tutorials, for fun since his mid-teenage years, then creating a YouTube channel on March 10, 2014. His first video was uploaded on March 24, 2014, and most of his early videos were recordings of his projects as a laboratory technician then at his parents' garage, with them later being filmed at his industrial-grade laboratory. Braun wanted his channel name, NileRed, to be related to chemistry, but not too chemical-sounding. He and one of his university colleagues looked through a book containing chemical names and started with "N" because his name began with the same letter. They settled on nile red, a compound used in biochemistry and microbiology for dyeing, because they thought it sounded good and also not like a chemical. A second channel, NileBlue, was created in 2016 to present more casual projects than the main channel, and a shorts channel, NileRed 2 (formerly NileRed Shorts), was created in 2021. He is assisted in his channel by two family members and two friends he hired.

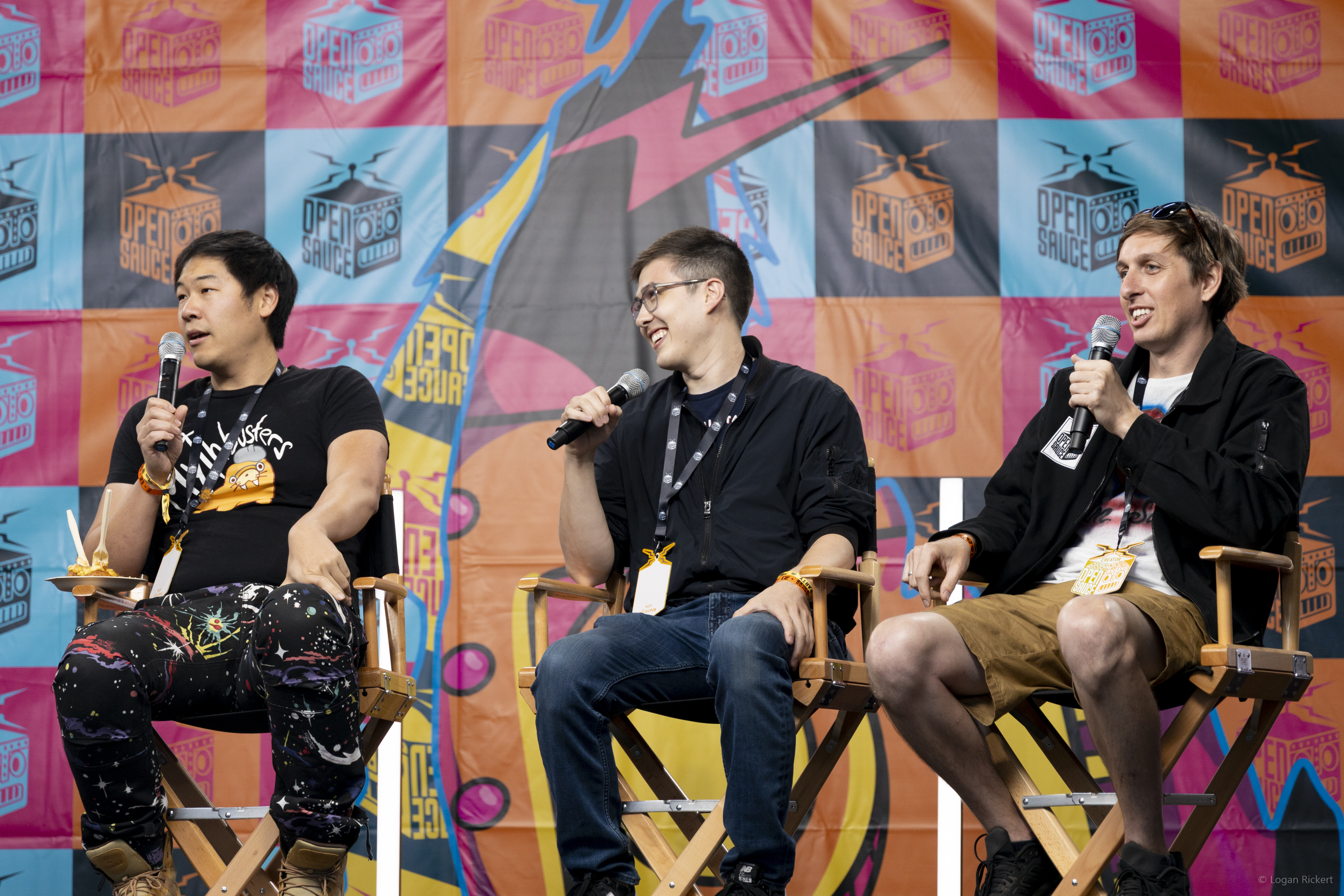
Braun (middle) with Allen Pan (left) and Kevin Kohler (right) at Open Sauce in 2023

Some of Braun's videos were deleted in 2018 during a purge of chemistry channels. In 2019 and 2020, the web magazine Hackaday reported on Braun extracting bismuth from pepto bismol, making aerogel, and making superconductors. In 2021, The A.V. Club and Newsweek reported on a video of him dissolving a hot dog in piranha solution, which went viral.

== Awards and nominations ==
Year	Award	Category	Result	Ref.
2020	Streamy Awards	Learning and Education	Nominated	
