= Kaho Shibuya =

Japanese social media personality (born 1991)

- 澁谷 果歩
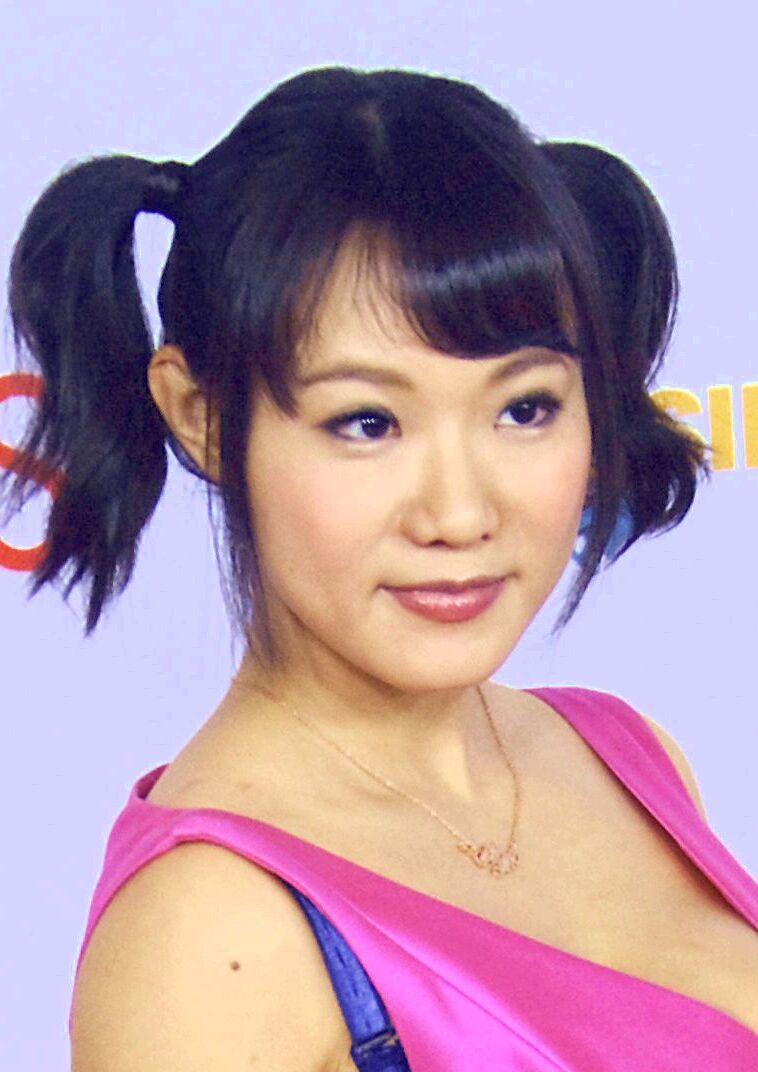
- Shibuya at the 2016 AVN Awards
- Born: May 20, 1991 (age 35); Tokyo, Japan
- Other names: Kahopai; Yuna Kawase
- Occupations: Cosplayer; streamer; writer
- Years active: 2014–present
- Height: 151 cm (4 ft 11 in)

Twitch information
- Channel: Shibuya_Kaho
- Years active: 2020–present
- Followers: 343 thousand
- Last updated: November 1, 2025
- Website: kaho-shibuya.com

Kaho Shibuya (澁谷 果歩, Shibuya Kaho; born May 20, 1991) is a Japanese cosplayer, streamer, writer, and former AV actress.

== Early life ==
Kaho Shibuya was born in Tokyo on May 20, 1991. Her father is a prominent doctor. She has a brother who is three years older. She grew up watching anime and reading manga. After high school, she studied English at Aoyama Gakuin University. In 2014, she passed the Test of English for International Communication with a perfect score of 990 points. In 2016, she earned qualifications in teaching English and childcare.

== Career ==
=== Writing career ===
Shibuya wrote for the daily newspaper Tokyo Sports as a baseball reporter, covering Nippon Professional Baseball's Pacific League from 2012 to 2014.

While taking a break from working with Tokyo Sports, Shibuya briefly worked as an English teacher. Shibuya then took a part-time job writing reviews on adult products in an effort to work as a freelance writer.

In 2020, she released the book The Japanese Porn Industry Unmasked: An Insider's Guide, a memoir detailing her experiences in the adult film industry; the book was later released in English in 2023.

=== Adult video career ===
While working part-time reviewing adult products, adult film productions began reaching out to Shibuya via her agency to have her perform anonymously in their videos. This then led her to debut in her first adult video at age 23 in November of 2014 through an exclusive deal with Alice Japan. Throughout her career, she has released more than 750 films.

From May 2015 to April 2016, Shibuya joined the Japanese AV idol group Sexy-J as its ninth member, and also recorded a single in August 2015. From April 2017 to November 2019, Shibuya hosted Kaho Shibuya's Tawawa Challenge on Japan's Skyperfect TV. Shibuya announced her retirement from the AV industry at an event held in Tokyo in May 2018.

In 2022, Shibuya has stated that while she does not intend to hide her adult film career, she is no longer involved with it, as she had retired. In February 2023, Shibuya sued four parties, including a production company, seeking ¥7 million in damages for uncensored versions of her adult videos being leaked online. In September 2023, she sent several cease and desist letters requesting adult film companies to suspend sales of all her previous adult films. On December 23, 2023, Shibuya announced that her actions had been successful, as well as her name delisted from adult film anthologies in which she had appeared.

=== Other ventures ===
Shibuya has taken her love of anime and manga professionally, appearing as a cosplay guest at anime conventions internationally. She has also published two photobooks of herself in various anime costumes. She appeared as an extra in Little Nights, Little Love. In December 2023, she was cast as Yue Kurumizawa in the anime series Adam's Sweet Agony. She also performed the ending theme song "Gin Gin Perfection".

Since August 2019, Shibuya has hosted the radio show Kaho Shibuya's TOKUMORI. She had previously been hired by a Japanese company to host their YouTube channel おもちゃん -Omochan- in November 2018, but quit in October 2021 when they canceled a shoot because she would not show enough skin. She launched her Twitch channel in June 2020.

Shibuya acted as a character sharing her same name in the 2025 video game Like a Dragon: Pirate Yakuza in Hawaii.

== Personal life ==
In May 2021, Shibuya revealed an incident where she was molested by her elder brother at the age of 11, and that her parents accused her of lying when she told them. This experience and her adult entertainment career severely strained her relationship with her parents, who wanted to retain their reputation as "model citizens," so she decided to cease all contact with them.

== Works ==
=== Books ===
- The Japanese Porn Industry Unmasked: An Insider’s Guide (AVについて女子が知っておくべきすべてのこと, AV Nitsuite Joshi ga Shitteokubeki Subete no Koto) (Cyzo, 2020) ISBN 9784866251318
  - English translation: Bento Books, 2023 ISBN 9781939326584

=== Discography ===
Singles

- Natsu no Ojosan (2015)
