= List of screensavers =

A screensaver is software designed to show moving images or patterns on a monitor when a computer sits idle. Screensavers were originally designed with the intention of preventing screen burn-in, a phenomenon that occurs on certain types of monitors when a static image is displayed for an extended period of time. Screensavers had their height of popularity in the 1980s and 1990s, with many commercially released examples such as After Dark and Johnny Castaway. Screensavers were later integrated into operating systems themselves, including Windows (since 1992 with Windows 3.1) and macOS (since 2001 with OS X 10.0). Screensaver development has slowed down considerably since the 2000s, following the rise of LCD monitors (largely impervious to burn-in) and the integration of standby power modes within monitors.

== Individual screensavers ==
Name	Release year	Author	Publisher	Platform	License	Maintained?	Notes
3D Flying Objects	1993	—N/a	Microsoft	Windows	Proprietary	No	Integrated into Windows from Windows NT 3.5 to Windows XP
3D Maze	1995	—N/a	Microsoft	Windows	Proprietary	No	Integrated into Windows from Windows NT 4.0 to Windows Me
3D Pipes	1993	—N/a	Microsoft	Windows	Proprietary	No	Integrated into Windows from Windows NT 3.5 to Windows XP
3D Text	1995	—N/a	Microsoft	Windows	Proprietary	Yes	Integrated into Windows from Windows NT 4.0 to Windows 11
Aurora	2006	Stephen Coy	Microsoft	Windows	Proprietary	No	Integrated into Windows Vista only
Bubbles	2006	Stephen Coy	Microsoft	Windows	Proprietary	Yes	Integrated into Windows from Windows Vista to Windows 11
Colors and Curves	1995	—N/a	Microsoft	Windows	Proprietary	No	Integrated into Windows from Windows 95 to Windows XP; also known as Beziers
Einstein@Home	2005	—N/a	Max Planck Society	Linux, macOS, Windows	GNU General Public License	Yes	
Electric Sheep	1999	Scott Draves	Spotworks	Linux, macOS, Windows, Android, tvOS, iPadOS, iOS	GNU General Public License (client)	Yes	
Energizer Bunny Screen Saver	1992	Digital Café	PC Dynamics	Windows	Proprietary	No	
Eric's Cascade	1998	Eric Snider	Delta Tao Software	Classic Mac OS	Proprietary	No	
Flurry	2002	Calum Robinson	Apple Inc.	macOS	Proprietary	Yes	Integrated into macOS since Mac OS X Jaguar
Flying Windows	1992	—N/a	Microsoft	Windows	Proprietary	No	Integrated into Windows from Windows 3.1 to Windows Me
Google Photos Screensaver	2006	—N/a	Google	Windows	Proprietary	No	
Johnny Castaway	1992	—N/a	Sierra On-Line/Dynamix	Windows	Proprietary	No	
Marine Aquarium	2000	James D. Sachs	SereneScreen	Windows, macOS, iOS, Android	Proprietary	Yes	
Marquee	1992	—N/a	Microsoft	Windows	Proprietary	No	Integrated into Windows from Windows 3.1 to Windows XP
Matinee	1993	—N/a	Access Softek	Windows	Proprietary	No	First screensaver capable of displaying full-motion video
Minecraft Plus!	2021	—N/a	Mojang Studios	Windows, browser	Proprietary	No	Created as Minecraft's 2021 April Fool's Day entry; a parody of Microsoft Plus!
Mystify	1992	Stephen Coy (Vista version)	Microsoft	Windows	Proprietary	Yes	Integrated into Windows from Windows 3.1 to Windows 11; also known as Mystify Your Mind; a modernized version of the original was included from Windows Vista and on
Razzle Dazzle	1990	James R. Shiflett	MicroTronics/Road Scholar Software	Windows, DOS	Proprietary	No	
Ribbons	2006	Stephen Coy	Microsoft	Windows	Proprietary	Yes	Integrated into Windows from Windows Vista to Windows 11
Roku City	2018	Kyle Jones (illustration)	Roku, Inc.	Roku OS	Proprietary	Yes	
SCRNSAVE	1983	John Socha	Self-published	DOS	Public domain	No	Considered by historians to be the first computer screensaver ever created
Starfield Simulation	1992	—N/a	Microsoft	Windows	Proprietary	No	Integrated into Windows from Windows 3.1 to Windows XP; also known as Starfield
Windows Energy	2006	—N/a	Microsoft	Windows	Proprietary	No	Integrated into Windows Vista only

== Screensaver managers and suites ==
Name	Release year	Original developers	Publisher	Platform	License	Maintained?	Notes
After Dark	1989	Jack Eastman, Patrick Beard	Berkeley Systems	Classic Mac OS, Windows, DOS	Proprietary	No	Many editions were released including some themed around licensed properties and also allowed for the integration of specifically developed third-party modules
GNOME Screensaver	2006	—N/a	GNOME Foundation	Linux	GPL	No	
Microsoft Plus!	1995	—N/a	Microsoft	Windows	Proprietary	No	Several screensavers were included as parts of four different enhancement packages, many of which were later integrated as standard in Windows 98 and Windows Me
Music Screeners	1995	—N/a	Sony	Windows	Proprietary	No	
Opus 'n Bill	1993	—N/a	Delrina	Classic Mac OS, Windows	Proprietary	No	Notable for triggering a lawsuit from Berkeley Systems over a depiction of flying toasters
Star Wars Screen Entertainment	1994	Presage Software	LucasArts	Classic Mac OS, Windows	Proprietary	No	
Whereabouts Deluxe	1989	Samer Ramadan	TriSoft	Windows, DOS	Proprietary	No	
XScreenSaver	1992	Jamie Zawinski	—N/a	Linux, macOS, iOS, Android	MIT License	Yes	

== See also ==
- DVD screensaver
