= Screen Savers =

Screen Savers or screensaver or variation, may refer to:

- Screensaver, computer programs intended to preserve CRT monitors from "burn-in"
  - GNOME Screensaver, GNOME Project's screen blanking tool
  - Google Pack Screensaver, a terminal inactivity screen photo displayer included in the Google Pack
- The Screen Savers, a technology-oriented television program that aired on TechTV and later G4

== See also ==
- XScreenSaver, X/Windows screensaver collection
- Flying toaster screensaver
- The New Screen Savers, technology webcast on TWIT.tv
- Screenslaver, a character from Disney/Pixar film The Incredibles 2
- Screen (disambiguation)
- Saver (disambiguation)
