= Issues relating to iOS =

iOS, a mobile operating system developed by Apple, has had a wide range of bugs and security issues discovered throughout its lifespan, including security exploits discovered in most versions of the operating system related to the practice of jailbreaking (to remove Apple's software restrictions), bypassing the user's lock screen (known as lock screen bypasses), issues relating to battery drain, crash bugs encountered when sending photos or certain Unicode characters via text messages sent through the Messages application, and general bugs and security issues later fixed in newer versions of the operating system.

== iOS 4 ==
=== Alarm clock bugs ===
Users reported bugs in the Alarm functionality of the Clock app in all versions of iOS 4. The first bug noticed was the "DST bug" which was first seen when some countries switched to/from daylight saving time from/to standard time in October or November 2010. It caused recurring alarms to go off an hour too early or too late. Apple promised the bug would be fixed in iOS 4.2, but according to some reports it still existed in iOS 4.3.1.

The second alarm clock bug discovered was the "New Year's Day bug" which showed up on January 1, 2011, and January 1, 2012. It caused non-recurring alarms to never work. However, two days after each New Year's Day, on January 3, 2011, the bug appeared to resolve itself. This bug was seemingly fixed in iOS 4.3.

=== Location data retention issues ===
At the 2011 O'Reilly Where 2.0 Conference Alasdair Allan, a researcher at University of Exeter, and Peter Warden, of Data Science Toolkit revealed that they had found an unencrypted file on their iPhones titled "consolidated.db" which contained a series of coordinates. At first the researchers thought it must've been a log of image location data. However after plotting the coordinate data onto a map they came to the conclusion that the data was actually a log of every cell tower they had connected to and every location they had visited from the past year. This raised concerns from multiple privacy advocacy groups as this data is usually only obtainable with a court order. The concern then lead to outrage from customers who felt violated by the alleged breach of privacy. This prompted a response from Apple who denied it was tracking users and instead claimed “The location data that researchers are seeing on the iPhone is not the past or present location of the iPhone, but rather the locations of Wi-Fi hotspots and cell towers surrounding the iPhone's location,”

Apple further claimed the purpose of the data was to assist the iPhone in rapidly and accurately calculating location. While they did concede that the device was storing the data too long, Apple also blamed the length of time the data was stored on a bug present in the release of iOS 4 that would be fixed soon. Apple attributed the outrage to a misunderstanding of the technology used in their devices. The bug was fixed in the release of iOS 4.3.3 on May 4, 2011 by reducing the cache to only 7 days worth of data, ceasing iTunes backups for location data, and lastly by deleting the entire cache whenever a user turned off "location services" in their settings.

== iOS 5 ==
=== Battery drain bugs ===
Apple confirmed that several battery life bugs were negatively affecting battery life in iOS 5. Apple attempted to fix these bugs with iOS 5.0.1 and 5.1 but the problem still remained. All of these bugs were fixed in iOS 5.1.1.

=== Wi-Fi ===
The launch of the iOS 5 update on October 12, 2011 (including iOS 5.0.1 released on November 10, 2011), led many users to report a major bug causing the device to lose Wi-Fi access. This problem was supposedly fixed with the release of iOS 5.1.1.

=== SIM card ===
Some users of the iPhone 4S and iPad (Wi-Fi + Cellular) reported issues with the SIM card in iOS 5.0, and even though Apple attempted to fix these issues in version 5.0.1 build 9A406 (for iPhone 4S only), they still remained.

=== Echo bugs ===
Some users of the iPhone 4 and iPhone 4S reported issues with having echo problems during phone call in the initial release of iOS 5, which caused echoes to appear randomly during phone calls made through earbuds. The other party in the call was generally unable to hear the conversation due to this problem. Apple released version 5.1.1 in an attempt to fix the problem.

== iOS 6 ==
=== Maps ===
Apple admitted that there were several bugs in the mapping app on iOS 6, with cities in the wrong location, some places missing altogether, some places misnamed, and some places of interest in the sea. Problems submitted by users were gradually addressed with daily updates to Maps.

=== Bluetooth ===
Many users reported a problem with Bluetooth audio streaming to a range of compatible devices. The sound cut out occasionally for no apparent reason. As of October 2012, no solution was provided by Apple.

=== Location-based reminders ===
Location-based reminders did not work for iPads, even though they were promised to work on cellular-enabled devices. It was later clarified by Apple that only the 4th generation iPad and the iPad Mini 1st generation or later would be able to use this.

=== Cellular Network ===
In iOS 6.1, users reported problems with cellular connectivity. This was addressed for the iPhone 4S in iOS 6.1.1 which "fixes an issue that could impact cellular performance and reliability for iPhone 4S."

=== Do Not Disturb ===
Many iPhone users experienced a bug with the Do Not Disturb feature when the calendar changed from 2012 to 2013. The feature would be left on past the scheduled time set by the user, allowing texts, notifications, and alarm settings to be missed. The bug was caused by a difference in formatting in the ISO calendar system versus the Gregorian calendar system. Apple did not offer a software update, saying that the bug would resolve on January 7, 2013.

=== Microsoft Exchange ===
Another bug caused issues when iOS devices connected to a Microsoft Exchange server to retrieve email, resulting in message "mailbox server resources are consumed, log growth becomes excessive, memory and CPU use may increase significantly, and server performance is affected". Microsoft suggested several workarounds; the bug was fixed with the release of iOS 6.1.2.

=== Lockscreen bypass code ===
On iPhones, another bug found in iOS 6.1 allowing bypassing the lock screen's passcode to temporarily gain full access to the Phone app, by performing a specific sequence of actions on the phone. This was fixed with the release of iOS 6.1.3.

=== Audio profile speakerphone ===
iPhone 5 users experienced dropped calls during the release of iOS 6.1.3 when there was an issue with the audio microphone profile. This also caused issues with many voice-over commands, including Siri, to get different results than expected or to fail easily. Apple fixed this bug with the release of iOS 6.1.4, which updated the audio speaker profile so users would get better results.

=== FaceTime ===
Shortly after Apple released iOS 7, users running iOS 6 were said to have problems using FaceTime. Apple later released a support document stating that this was due to an expired device certificate and that devices that supported iOS 7 should update to it to resolve these issues, and that devices unable to run iOS 7, the fourth-generation iPod Touch and the iPhone 3GS, should upgrade to iOS 6.1.6.

=== Data security ===
An attacker could collect or modify data in sessions protected by SSL/TLS protocols. This same bug was also reported on iOS 7.0.4 and iOS 7.0.5 for the iPhone 5C and 5S. For the iPhone 3GS and the iPod Touch (4th generation), iOS 6.1.6 was released to fix this issue since iOS 7 is not compatible with these devices. (see iOS 7.x)

== iOS 7 ==
=== Passcode screen bypass bugs ===
A lock screen bypass was discovered in 2013 within hours of the release of iOS 7, caused by the ability to use the control center through the lock screen and tapping on the camera or timer buttons. The latest iPhone models, the iPhone 5S and the iPhone 5C, were not affected. As a workaround, the Control Center could be turned off for the lock screen in the Settings app. This was fixed in iOS 7.0.2.

=== Motion sickness ===
Users complained about motion sickness-like symptoms when using iOS 7 because of the user interface's animation and parallax effects. In iOS 7.1, a new function in the Settings app named "Reduce Motion" was introduced to reduce the motion of the user interface and disable the parallax effects.

=== Creation of CardDAV Accounts not working ===
Creating a CardDAV Account had a bug that required manual fixing of the CardDAV-Server-URL.

=== Battery drain problems ===
Users reported seeing significant drain on their devices' battery after installing the update to iOS 7.1.

=== Safari ignores local domain ===
Local domain names could no longer be resolved in Safari, breaking short names on the local network.

=== Home screen crashes ===
Users reported various crashes of the home screen, the core service that renders the home screen icons, Notification Center, Control Center, Siri and the lock screen. This was fixed in iOS 7.1.

=== Data security ===
Secure transport failed to validate the authenticity of connection. This issue was addressed by restoring missing validation steps. This could allow an attacker with a privileged network position to capture or modify data in sessions protected by SSL/TLS. This issue was addressed by the release of iOS 7.0.6.

=== Battery indicator stuck until restart ===
iPhone 4S users reported problems with the battery indicator, which would freeze at the same value until the iPhone was restarted.

=== Touch ID ===
In iOS 7.1, Touch ID was not functioning on the iPhone 5S. The problem could not be resolved by turning Touch ID on and off in the "Fingerprint and Passcode" menu, restarting, resetting, or restoring the device using iTunes. This issue was fixed in iOS 7.1.1.

== iOS 8 ==
=== HealthKit ===
Shortly after the release of iOS 8, Apple released a statement pointing out that a bug had been found in the operating system which prevented HealthKit-compatible apps from being released alongside iOS 8. Apps already released that included HealthKit functionality were withdrawn from the App Store. iOS 8.0.1/8.0.2 included a fix for this issue.

=== iPhone 6 cellular issues ===
iPhone 6 and iPhone 6 Plus users who updated to iOS 8.0.1 wirelessly had cellular service and Touch ID disabled due to a software issue. Over-the-air downloads of iOS 8.0.1 were stopped within an hour of the release of the software, but many early adopters had been affected. These issues were fixed with the release of iOS 8.0.2 a day later.

=== Touch ID ===
Users who updated phones with Touch ID enabled to iOS 8.3 found out that they could not use Touch ID to make App Store purchases. A workaround was devised by users to repair this issue.

=== Performance ===
Many users of older generation devices such as the iPhone 4S and the iPad 2 reported performance issues with iOS 8. iOS 8.1.1 addressed the problem.

=== Keyboard ===
Several issues with the new Keyboard API in iOS 8 were reported, including problems with custom keyboards crashing or not appearing, or being replaced with the default keyboard. iOS 8.3 addressed the problem.

=== iMessage ===
When a specific sequence of Arabic, Unicode, and English characters were sent through iMessage to a device running iOS 8.0 through iOS 8.3, it caused the device to crash and restart; if the Messages app was then opened, the crash repeated. This bug, which had existed since iOS 6 but had previously had little impact, was reported by a Reddit user in May 2015 and prompted a lot of such messages to be sent deliberately. This issue was resolved in iOS 8.4, released on July 1, 2015.

== iOS 9 ==
=== Game Center ===
Many users reported greatly increased Game Center loading times which in turn caused apps that used Game Center logins to appear to load slowly. This was fixed with the release of iOS 9.1.

=== January 1, 1970 ===
On 64-bit iOS devices, setting the date to January 1, 1970, and restarting the iPhone would prevent the device from starting up until it lost power or its time setting shifted past January 1, 1970. This was fixed with the release of iOS 9.3.

=== Error 53 ===
Updating an iPhone 6 with a replaced Touch ID sensor to a new version of iOS would cause the update to fail and report an "Error 53.", as a result of additional hardware security checks left unintentionally. This was fixed with a re-release of iOS 9.2.1, with build number 13D20.

=== Error 53 Lawsuit ===
Apple faced a lawsuit filed February 11, 2016 over the "Error 53" message that some iPhone users experienced after updating their devices. The lawsuit alleged that Apple's software update caused some iPhones to become "permanently bricked," and that the company failed to adequately inform users about the risks of updating their devices.

=== 9.7-inch iPad Pro bricking issue ===
iOS 9.3.2 caused problems for some 9.7-inch iPad Pro owners, with multiple MacRumors readers and Twitter users reporting issues shortly after installing the update over the air. Affected users saw an "Error 56" message that instructs them to plug their devices into iTunes.

As a result, iOS 9.3.2 update was withdrawn. This issue was fixed with a re-release version of iOS 9.3.2 in June 2016, with build number 13F72.

=== iPhone 4S lawsuit ===
Apple faced a lawsuit alleging its iOS 9 mobile operating software significantly slowed down the iPhone 4S. The lawsuit sought $5 million from Apple.

=== Bluetooth ===
Many iPhone SE owners experienced various issues relating to phone calls via Bluetooth connectivity. This issue was fixed with iOS 9.3.2.

=== Security ===
A WebKit rendering component exploit was discovered that threatened users' security by allowing access to device sensors was discovered with the release of 9.3.3. The exploit worked by tricking the user to click on a URL contained in an SMS. This was quickly fixed with the release of 9.3.5.

== iOS 10 ==
=== Recovery mode issues ===
The initial iOS 10 update released on September 13, 2016, caused many iPhones and iPads to get stuck in recovery mode, requiring the devices to be connected to a Mac or PC with iTunes in order to retry the update or restore them to factory settings.

As a result, the initial release was pre-installed only on iPhone 7 and iPhone 7 Plus. Apple released iOS 10.0.1 shortly afterwards, and issued an apology.

=== "30% battery bug" ===
Many users, especially those owning an iPhone 6s, reported that their phones would shut down automatically with 30% battery left. This issue was fixed with the release of iOS 10.3. As of the iOS 10.2.1 release, iOS throttled CPU performance on iPhones with batteries in poor health. Due to poor communication from Apple on the addition of this feature, suspicions about planned obsolescence arose, which eventually led to the Batterygate controversy shortly after the release of iOS 11. As a result, Apple announced battery replacements would be $29 instead of $79. They also announced that iOS 11.3 would show battery health in the Settings > Battery menu and let the user decide if they wanted the previous 30% shutdown behavior or the throttled CPU.

=== Crash caused by 5-second video ===
On November 22, 2016, a five-second video file originally named "IMG_0942.MP4" started crashing iOS on an increasing count of devices, forcing users to reboot. It gained massive popularity through social media channels and messaging services.

== iOS 11 ==
=== Calculator ===
Due to a bug related to UI animation, quickly typing in an equation caused the built-in Calculator app to give incorrect answers. The bug was fixed in iOS 11.2.

=== Mail ===
Users with Outlook.com, Office 365, and certain Exchange accounts were unable to send email. This was resolved with the release of iOS 11.0.1.

=== AutoCorrect ===
Users complained of a bug in the built-in keyboard in iOS 11 that changed the letter "I" to "A [?]", if automatic correction was enabled. This was fixed with the release of iOS 11.1.1.

=== December 2 respring ===
A bug in iOS 11 was present that would cause the device's home screen to constantly crash if an app sent local notifications on or after 00:15 on December 2, 2017. Apple responded by releasing iOS 11.2 early, which fixed the bug.

=== Telugu character crash ===
A bug was present in iOS 10 and 11 that would cause an app to crash when a certain sequence of Telugu characters was pasted into it, or for the phone's home screen if pasted into Spotlight search. The bug was fixed with iOS 11.2.6.

=== iPhone 8 touchscreen issues after third-party repair ===
The iOS 11.3 update caused some iPhone 8 devices that had had their screens repaired by a third party repair shop to become unusable by disabling the touch screen. Apple corrected this issue by releasing iOS 11.3.1.

== iOS 12 ==
=== Group FaceTime bug ===
A privacy issue was discovered when using FaceTime in iOS 12.1 that allowed users to eavesdrop the recipient with access to their camera and audio without them answering the call and their knowledge when adding another person to the call. As a result, Apple disabled Group FaceTime entirely in iOS versions 12.1 to 12.1.3. An update was later released on 12.1.4 to fix the bug.

=== Sending iMessages to the wrong contacts ===
iOS 12 merged conversation history for devices using a shared Apple ID even if separate handles were used, such as unique phone numbers or email addresses. As a result, iMessages may have been delivered to the wrong device.

=== iOS 12.3.2 update incompatibility ===
The iOS 12.3.2 update, released for iPhone 8 Plus devices only, caused users to be unable to transfer backups for this version to a different iPhone model as only the iPhone 8 Plus has this software update.

=== iOS 12.4 jailbreak ===
A kernel vulnerability that was fixed in iOS 12.3 was accidentally restored in iOS 12.4. This made iOS 12.4 vulnerable to exploits using the vulnerability, and a jailbreak was released. Later, the kernel vulnerability was patched again by Apple in iOS 12.4.1.

== iOS 13 ==
=== Battery drain issues ===
Some users reported excessive battery drain following the initial release of iOS 13. iOS 13.1.1 fixed the problem.

=== Memory management issue ===
After the release of iOS 13.2, reports followed about applications being cleared from memory at a higher rate than in iOS 13.1, including on the then latest iPhone models. Apple attempted to fix the issue twice in iOS 13.2.2 and iOS 13.3.

=== HomePod bricking issue ===
According to multiple people on the MacRumors forums and Reddit, the 13.2 update "bricked" their HomePods, rendering them unusable. Users who saw problems experienced a "white swirl" on both of their HomePods, or an endless reset loop. As a result, the update for the HomePod was withdrawn by Apple. Apple advised some users not to install iOS 13.2 on the HomePod and to not reset the HomePod after installing iOS 13.2. This issue was fixed with the release of iOS 13.2.1.

=== iOS 13.5 jailbreak ===
A jailbreak software called Unc0ver was updated in May 2020 with an exploit targeting devices running iOS 11 and above, including the then-latest iOS 13.5. The issue was fixed with iOS 13.5.1.

== iOS 14 ==
=== Missing keyboard for Spotlight search ===
The keyboard did not appear when using the Spotlight search function.

=== Default app setting reset ===
The ability to change the default app for messages, email, web browsing, or other services was reset to the stock app every time the device was reset or turned off. Apple attempted to fix the issue with iOS 14.0.1.

=== General battery drain ===
On September 30, 2020, Apple acknowledged a battery drain issue in iOS 14 and released a supporting document that offered the users tricks to fix the poor battery performance. In this document Apple claimed that unpairing the iPhone from an Apple Watch followed by erasing all data and settings of the iPhone, and restoring from a backup could be a possible fix for the battery life.

== iOS 16 ==
=== Image capture issues ===
On iOS 16.0, a bug caused Image Capture to fail to import photos on computers running macOS Mojave and older. This was fixed in the iOS 16.1 update.

=== Activation issues ===
There was a bug which caused activation issues on the iPhone 14. This was fixed in iOS 16.0.1.

=== Camera shaking issues ===
There was a bug which caused shaking in the Camera app for iPhone 14 Pro/Pro Max users. This was fixed in iOS 16.0.2.

=== Copy and paste alerts ===
Some iOS 16 users complained about excessive alerts when copying and pasting content from multiple apps. Apple attempted to fix this issue in iOS 16.0.2, but according to some reports, it was only fixed in iOS 16.1.

=== Mail lockout ===
An Apple Mail bug caused a specifically crafted address in the "from" field to lock users out of Apple Mail on versions prior to iOS 16.0.3. This bug only appeared to affect iCloud Mail. Apple fixed the issue in iOS 16.0.3.

=== Camera app slowdowns ===
There were reports that the Camera app was slow to open on the iPhone 14 series phones. Apple fixed this issue in iOS 16.0.3.

=== Missing notifications ===
Some users reported that incoming notifications (including calls) were not being displayed. This was fixed in iOS 16.0.3.

=== CarPlay microphone issues ===
Prior to iOS 16.0.3, some CarPlay users reported low microphone volume when they spoke during phone calls with their iPhone connected to CarPlay. Apple fixed this issue in iOS 16.0.3.

=== WiFi issues ===
Some users reported that their WiFi connection was being lost after updating to iOS 16.1. Apple fixed this issue in iOS 16.1.1.

=== iPhone 14 Pro series "horizontal lines" issue ===
In December 2022, reports surfaced of an issue in the iPhone 14 Pro series that caused horizontal lines to appear when said phones started up. Apple fixed this issue in iOS 16.3.

=== Messages and Photos vulnerabilities ===
There were a large number of security issues (including root access issues) with Messages and Photos that Apple patched in iOS 16.3.

=== Storage issues ===
Some users reported that storage took over their space on iOS 16.4. When they tried to clear storage, the storage would not free up. Apple fixed this issue in iOS 16.5.

=== Weather app issues ===
Some users experienced Weather app issues on iOS 16.4. Apple reportedly fixed this issue in iOS 16.4.1.

=== Screen Time issues ===
Some users reported that their Screen Time settings did not sync across devices. Apple reportedly fixed this issue in iOS 16.5.

== iOS 17 ==
=== iPhone 15 Pro thermal issues ===
Some users reported that some iPhone 15 Pro models were prone to overheating. Apple insisted that the overheating issue was related to a software bug and was not related to the new hardware or design in the iPhone 15 Pro models, which introduced a new titanium frame with an aluminum substructure to replace the stainless steel frame from the past several Pro models. Since iOS 17.0.3 was released, new reports surfaced of other overheating issues not related to fast-charging. The issue was resolved in iOS 17.1 after Apple fixed a software bug relating to the issue.

=== NFC compatibility issues on iPhone 15 Pro by certain BMW owners ===
A specific and concerning issue arose where some iPhone 15 Pro/Pro Max owners experienced NFC chip failure, which impacted functionalities like Apple Pay and digital car keys, after wirelessly charging their device on certain BMW in-car charging pads. Affected users reported their iPhone entering a data recovery mode with a white screen, and upon reboot, the NFC chip would no longer function, often displaying a "Could Not Set Up Apple Pay" error message. Initially, some customers received replacement iPhones from Apple, but these replacement devices were also susceptible to the same issue when used with the problematic BMW chargers, indicating a broader compatibility or design flaw rather than isolated device defects.

Apple attempted to address this issue with the iOS 17.1.1 and 17.2 updates. User reports after these updates were mixed but generally indicated improvement. Some users confirmed that the iOS 17.1.1 update fixed the problem, with their NFC functionality remaining intact even if the phone still experienced temporary overheating during wireless charging in the car. This suggests that while the underlying thermal load from some BMW wireless chargers might persist, Apple's software updates managed to prevent the NFC chip from failing permanently. The issue appears to have been a complex interaction between the phone's thermal management, the wireless charging pad's heat output, and the NFC chip's sensitivity, which Apple largely mitigated through software adjustments.

=== iPhone 15 series display image persistence ===
Some users reported that their iPhone 15 series phones were experiencing screen burn-in. Apple fixed this issue with iOS 17.1, and clarified that the issue was image persistence, as opposed to screen burn-in, which it was being referred to at the time. The difference is that screen burn-in is a hardware issue that requires a screen replacement, but image persistence can be fixed with a software update.

=== Shutdown issues ===
Some users reported that their iPhones turned off temporarily at night, interrupting alarms and other iPhone features. This affected both iPhone 15 models and older devices as well, suggesting that the bug was related to iOS 17.

=== App switcher appears while typing ===
A hard-to-replicate bug caused the app switcher to appear during typing for some users. It was possible to work around this issue by disabling the Reachability feature.

=== iOS 17.3 beta 2 boot loop ===
An issue with iOS 17.3 beta 2 caused devices to be in a constant boot loop after installing the beta, primarily affecting the iPhone 12–15 series phones. As a result, the beta was pulled three hours after release. According to some reports, this issue was related to the Back Tap feature.

=== Text auto-completion issues ===
Users of iOS 17 were experiencing text auto-completion inserting duplicate or overlapping words, or words being inserted at the wrong spot. This behavior was fixed with iOS 17.3.1.

=== Photos reappearing ===
After updating to iOS 17.5, some users reportedly experienced a bug which caused some of their deleted photos to reappear on their devices. iOS 17.5.1 was released to fix this issue, which according to Apple, was 'rare' and caused by database corruption.

== iOS 26 ==
Some users reported Visual glitches, UI lag, and Wi-Fi and Bluetooth turning off and on randomly in iOS 26.

== See also ==
- Issues relating to iPhone OS
