= Image burn-in =

Image burn-in may refer to:

- Afterimage, an optical illusion
- Screen burn-in or image persistence
