= Samsung Galaxy S8 =

2017 Android smartphones by Samsung Electronics

Samsung Galaxy S8 series

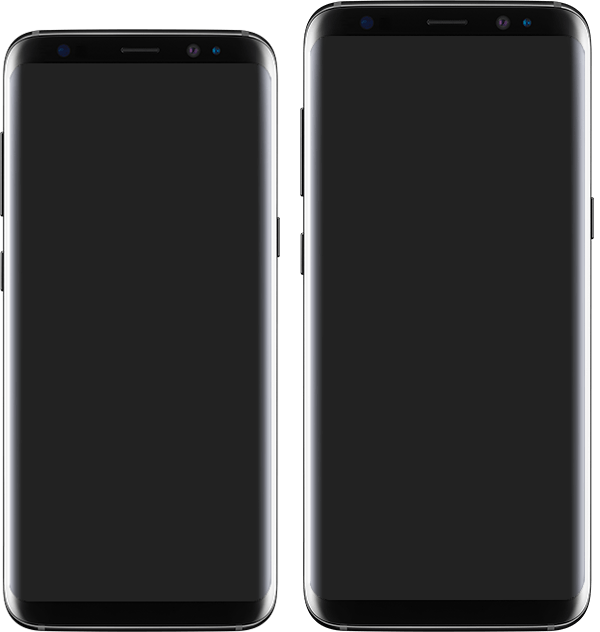
- Samsung Galaxy S8 (left) and the S8+ (right)
- Brand: Samsung
- Manufacturer: Samsung Electronics
- Type: S8 and S8 Active: Smartphone; S8+: Phablet
- Series: Galaxy S
- First released: S8 and S8+: 21 April 2017; 9 years ago S8 Active: 11 August 2017; 9 years ago
- Availability by region: 21 April 2017: South Korea Canada United States Taiwan; 28 April 2017: Australia Ireland Russia United Kingdom; 29 April 2017: Singapore Iran; 5 May 2017: Malaysia India Saudi Arabia Philippines New Zealand Thailand Indonesia; 12 May 2017: Brazil; 18 May 2017: China; 25 May 2017: Hong Kong; 8 June 2017: Japan South Africa Nigeria Puerto Rico
- Discontinued: 13 May 2019; 7 years ago
- Units sold: 41.067 million
- Predecessor: Samsung Galaxy S7
- Successor: Samsung Galaxy S9
- Related: Samsung Galaxy Note 8 Samsung Galaxy A8 (2018)
- Compatible networks: 2G, 3G, 4G, LTE
- Form factor: Slate
- Dimensions: S8 and S8 Active: 148.9 mm × 68.1 mm × 8.0 mm (5.86 in × 2.68 in × 0.31 in); S8+: 159.5 mm × 73.4 mm × 8.1 mm (6.28 in × 2.89 in × 0.32 in)
- Weight: S8: 155 g (5.5 oz); S8+: 173 g (6.1 oz); S8 Active: 208 g (7.3 oz)
- Operating system: Original: Android 7.0 "Nougat" with Samsung Experience 8.1; Current: Android 9 "Pie" with One UI Version 1.0 (without Treble); Unofficial alternative: One UI 2, Android 11, Android 12, Android 13
- System-on-chip: Global: Exynos 8895; USA/Canada/China/HK/Japan: Qualcomm Snapdragon 835
- CPU: Exynos: Octa-core (4×2.3 GHz M2 Mongoose & 4×1.7 GHz) Cortex-A53 (GTS); Snapdragon: Octa-core (4×2.45 GHz Kryo & 4×1.9 GHz Kryo)
- GPU: Exynos: Mali-G71 MP20; Snapdragon: Adreno 540
- Memory: 4 or 6 GB LPDDR4X RAM
- Storage: 64 GB UFS 2.1 / UFS 2.0 in some devices
- Removable storage: microSDXC, expandable up to 256 GB
- Battery: Non-removable: S8: 3000 mAh; S8+: 3500 mAh; S8 Active: 4000 mAh; all 15 Watts
- Charging: Fast charging up to 9W; Qi wireless charging
- Rear camera: 12 MP (1.4 μm), f/1.7, OIS, 4K at 30 fps, 1440p at 30fps, 1080p at 60 fps, 720p at 30 fps, slow motion 720p at 240 fps
- Front camera: 8 MP, autofocus, 1440p/1080p/720p video recording at 30fps
- Display: 2960×1440 1440p Super AMOLED capacitive touchscreen display, HDR10; S8 and S8 Active: 5.8 in (150 mm), 225 ppcm (572 ppi); S8+: 6.2 in (160 mm), 208 ppcm (529 ppi); (both Diamond PenTile)
- Sound: Sound and audio features e.g. speaker(s), audio jack, vibration motor, etc.
- Connectivity: Physical and wireless e.g. USB type-C, Bluetooth 5.0 (LE up to 2 Mbit/s), 802.11 a/b/g/n/ac (2.4/5GHz) WiFi, NFC, location (GPS, Galileo, GLONASS, BeiDou)
- Data inputs: Accelerometer; Barometer; Fingerprint scanner; Iris scanner; Magnetometer; Gyroscope; Hall sensor; Proximity sensor
- Water resistance: IP68, up to 1.5 m (4.9 ft) for 30 minutes
- Model: SM-G950x (S8); SM-G955x (S8+); SM-G892A (S8 Active); (last letter varies by carrier and international models)
- Codename: Project Dream; Cruiser (Galaxy S8 Active)
- Other: Physical sound volume keys Bixby key
- Website: www.samsung.com/global/galaxy/galaxy-s8

The Samsung Galaxy S8 and S8+ are Android-based smartphones produced by Samsung Electronics as the eighth generation of the Samsung Galaxy S series. The Samsung Galaxy S8 & Samsung Galaxy S8+ were unveiled on 29 March 2017 and directly succeeded the Samsung Galaxy S7 & S7 Edge, with a North American release on 21 April 2017 and international rollout throughout April and May. The Samsung Galaxy S8 Active was announced on 8 August 2017 and is exclusive to certain US cellular carriers.

The Samsung Galaxy S8 and Samsung Galaxy S8+ feature upgraded hardware and major design changes over the S7 line, including larger screens with a taller aspect ratio and curved sides on both the smaller and larger models, iris and face recognition, a new suite of virtual assistant features known as Bixby (along with a new dedicated physical button for launching the assistant), a shift from Micro-USB to USB-C charging, and support for Samsung DeX, a docking station feature that allows the phones to be used with a desktop interface with keyboard and mouse input support. The Active lineup features tougher materials designed for protection against shock, water, shatter and dust with a metal frame and a tough texture for improved grip that make the S8 Active have a rugged design. The Active's screen measures the same size as the standard S8 model but loses the curved edges in favour of a metal frame.

The S8 and S8+ received positive reviews. Their design, screen quality, and form factor received praise, while critics also liked the updated software and camera optimizations. They received criticism for duplicate software apps, lackluster Bixby features at launch, and for the placement of the fingerprint sensor on the rear next to the camera lens. A video published after the phones' release proved that the devices' facial recognition and iris scanner can be fooled by suitable photographs of the user.

The S8 and S8+ were in high demand at release. During the pre-order period, a record one million units were booked in South Korea, and overall sales numbers were 30% higher than the Galaxy S7. However, subsequent reports in May announced sales of over five million units, a notably lower first-month sales number than previous Galaxy S series models.

On 11 March 2018, Samsung launched the successor to the S8, the Samsung Galaxy S9.

== History ==
Before its official announcement, media outlets reported on rumours and information from industry insiders. In December 2016, SamMobile reported that the Galaxy S8 would not feature a 3.5 mm (0.14 in) headphone jack, later reported to be a false rumour. In January 2017, The Guardian reported on larger screens for both phone models, with edge-to-edge "infinity" displays and very limited bezels, and an iris scanner. Additionally, The Guardian stated that the phones would come with 64 gigabytes of storage and support microSD cards, use USB-C connectors, and feature a "Bixby" intelligent personal assistant. Soon after, VentureBeat revealed photos of the phones and additional details, including the lack of physical navigation and home buttons, in which the fingerprint sensor was moved to the back of the phone. Evan Blass tweeted in mid-March about color options for the phones.

The Galaxy S8 and S8+ were officially unveiled on 29 March 2017, with pre-orders beginning on 30 March and official U.S. release on 21 April 2017. Following Best Buy retail listings in March, Samsung opened pre-orders for unlocked U.S. handsets on 9 May 2017, with availability starting 31 May.

The devices have also been released internationally. On 21 April 2017, they were made available in South Korea, Canada, and Taiwan. On 28 April at the same year, they were made available in the United Kingdom, Australia, Ireland, and Russia, followed by Singapore one day later. On 5 May, they were made available in Malaysia. New Zealand, Pakistan, India, the Philippines, and Thailand, followed by Brazil on 12 May. On 25 May, they were made available in China, and Hong Kong. On 8 June, they were made available in Japan.

In July 2017, pictures of the Galaxy S8 Active were leaked on Reddit, and the following month, AT&T "accidentally" confirmed its existence through a document in a promotional campaign. It officially became available for pre-order, exclusively through AT&T, on 8 August 2017, with in-store purchase available 11 August. VentureBeat reported in late September that the device would also become available through T-Mobile in November, and Samsung subsequently confirmed both T-Mobile and Sprint availability in early November.

== Specifications ==
=== Hardware ===
==== Display ====
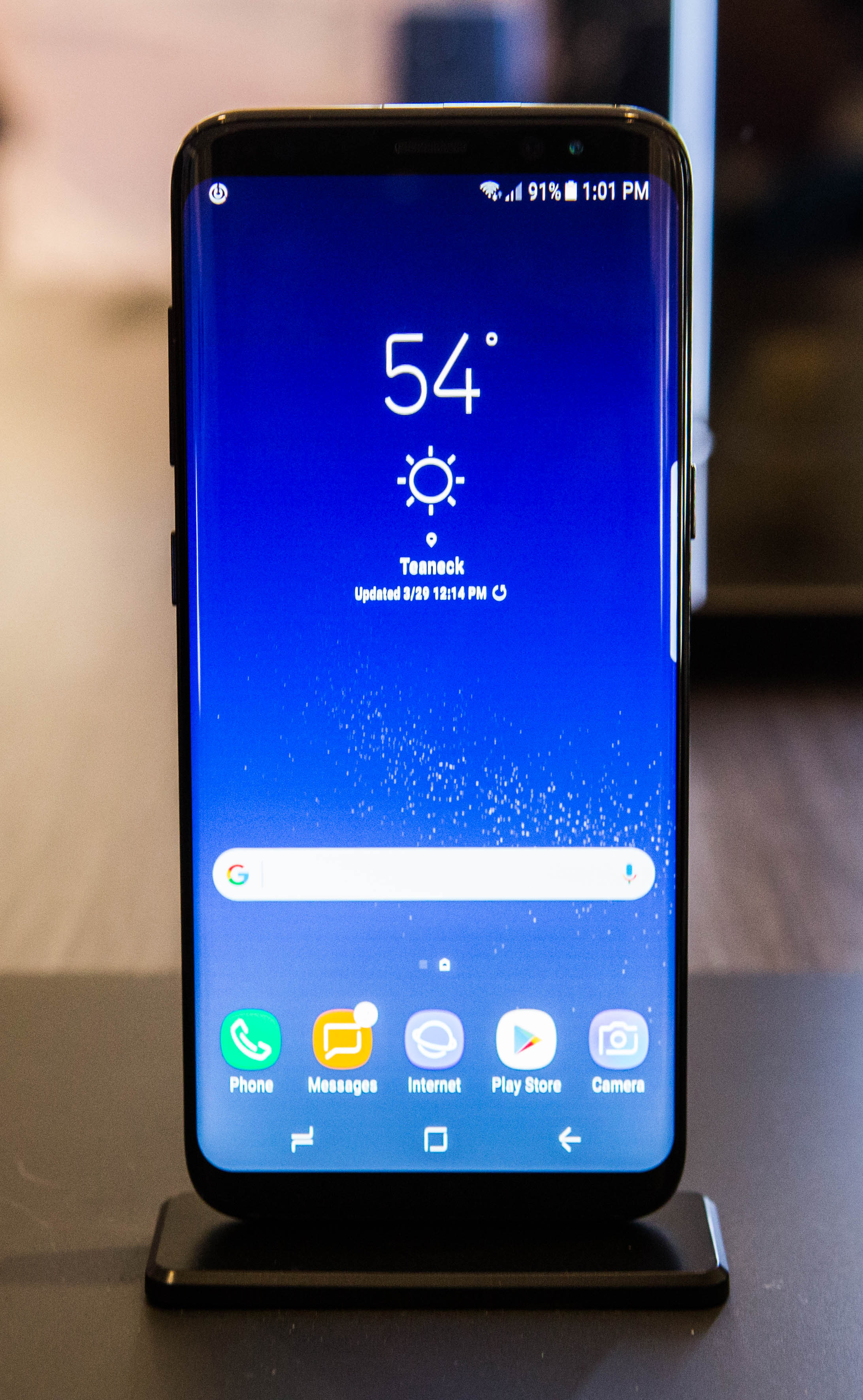
The "Infinity Display" of a Galaxy S8, shown during the Samsung "Unpacked" event in 2017

The Galaxy S8 and S8+ both feature 1440p OLED displays, with an 18.5:9 (37:18) aspect ratio taller than the 16:9 ratio used by the majority of smartphones released until then. The S8 has a 5.8-inch panel, while the S8+ uses a larger 6.2-inch panel. The displays on both devices curve along the side bezels of the device, with minimal bezels that Samsung markets as an "infinity display", and the display panel itself has rounded edges. They use DCI-P3, offering what screen-testing website DisplayMate describes as the largest native color gamut, highest peak brightness, highest contrast rating in ambient light, highest screen resolution, lowest reflectance, and highest contrast ratio.

==== Chipsets ====
The S8 features an octa-core Exynos 8895 system-on-chip and 4 GB of RAM; models in North American and East Asian markets utilize the Qualcomm Snapdragon 835 instead. Both chips are manufactured by Samsung with a 10 nm process. They contain 64 GB of internal storage, expandable via microSD card.

==== Design ====
In the United States, the S8 and S8+ are available in Midnight Black, Orchid Gray, and Arctic Silver color options, whereas gold and blue are available internationally. The blue option was made available in the U.S. in July 2017.

Unlike past Galaxy S series models, the S8 line does not feature physical navigation keys, electing to use on-screen keys instead. However, unlike other implementations, the home button can still be activated if it is hidden or the screen is off. The S8's display features pressure sensitivity limited to the home button. To prevent the home button from burn-in damage, its position moves slightly.

The Galaxy S8 Active features a rugged design and significantly tougher materials to make it shock, shatter, water, and dust resistant. It has a larger battery than either of the regular S8s, at 4000 mAh. Unlike the previous phones in the Active line, the S8 Active does not have tactile buttons, instead using onscreen keys like the regular variants of the S8. It also no longer has the dedicated action button of previous versions which could be reprogrammed to be a shortcut to favorite apps, with the action button being replaced with the Bixby button. The "infinity" edge display of the standard models is removed, and replaced with a metal frame and bumpers in the corners to protect from shocks, while the back is fitted with a "rugged, tough texture for a secure grip". Its screen also measures 5.8 inches, the size of the regular S8, and has quad HD Super AMOLED in 18.5:9 aspect ratio. The S8 Active is sold in Meteor Gray, but AT&T also has a Titanium Gold color.

==== Camera ====
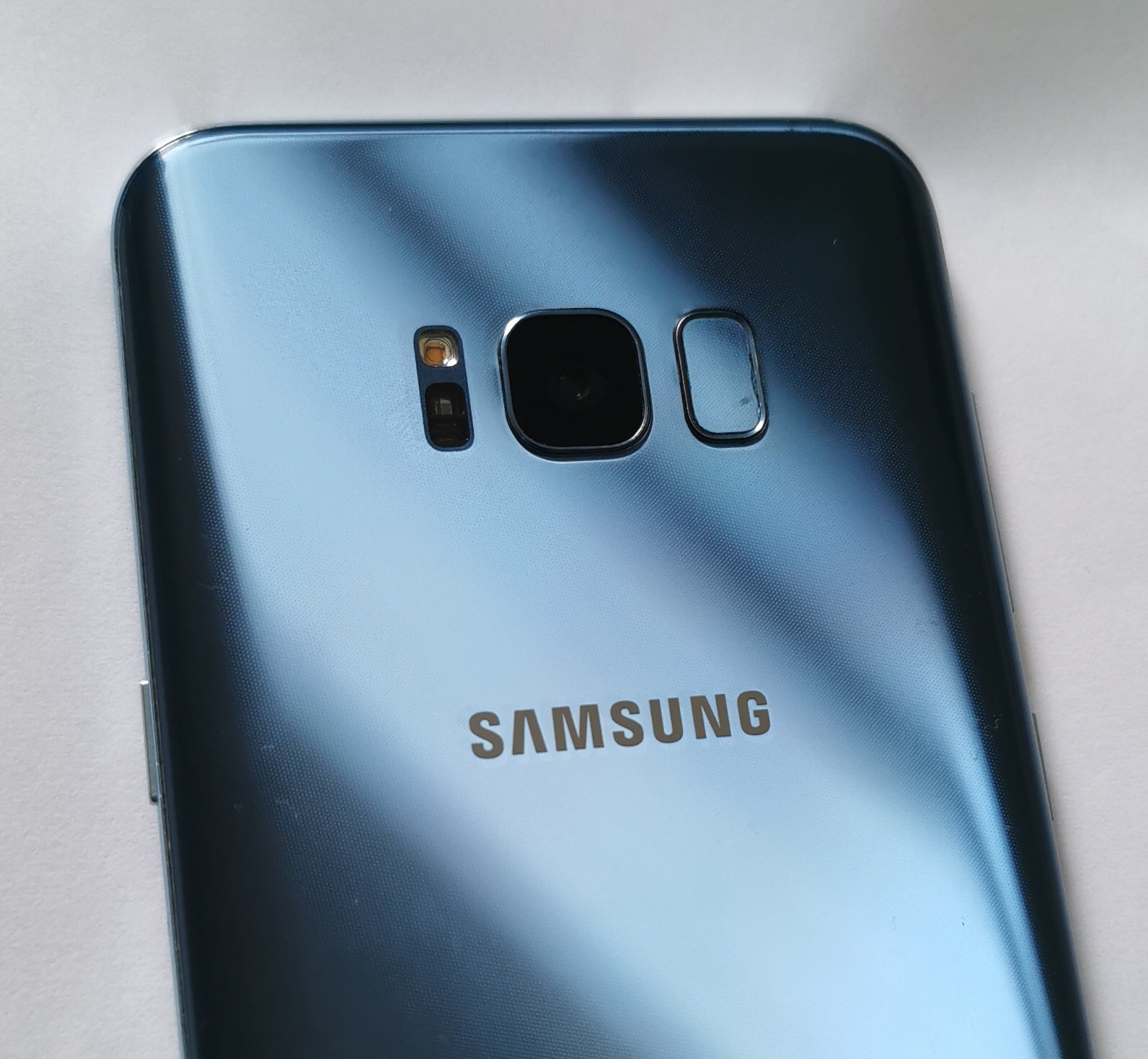
The rear view of a Samsung Galaxy S8+, showing the camera on the middle, and the fingerprint scanner on the right

While The Verge claims that the S8 uses the same 12 MP rear camera as the S7, though with software improvements, a report from PhoneArena claims that the phones carry new, custom camera modules. In addition, the S8 has a Pro Mode, which functions similarly to a DSLR camera and has custom options for shutter speed, ISO, and colour balance. It also supports the raw imagery format Digital Negative. The front-facing camera was upgraded to an 8-megapixel sensor with autofocus. The S8 features fingerprint and iris scanners; the fingerprint reader is relocated to the rear of the device, to the left of the camera, due to the removal of the physical home button. In addition to an iris scanner, the S8 also features face-scanning as an option to unlock the phone. Face recognition technology had previously been implemented in earlier models since the Galaxy S III.

==== Batteries ====
The S8 and S8+ use non-removable 3000 and 3500 mAh Lithium-Ion batteries respectively, as compared to 3000 and 3600 mAh on the Samsung Galaxy S7 and S7 Edge respectively. Samsung stated that it had engineered the batteries to retain their capacity for a longer period than previous models.

The S8 supports AirFuel Inductive (formerly PMA) and Qi wireless charging standards. Due to the recalls of the Samsung Galaxy Note 7, Samsung said in a press conference it is committed to stricter quality control and safety testing procedures on all of the company's future products.

The device can charge at 9 W (5V 1.8A) through an ordinary USB and 12.5 W through USB-C power delivery (5V 2.5A). Charging speeds upwards of 15 watts (9V 1.67A) are attainable through Qualcomm Quick Charge 2.0, however fast charging is disabled during operation of the device (while the screen is turned on), throttling charging speed down to less than half, regardless of temperature.

==== Storage ====
Samsung also launched a Galaxy S8+ with 128 GB of storage and 6 GB of RAM exclusively in China and South Korea, and a bundle offer in the countries provides both the exclusive model and the Samsung DeX docking station. The unique variant was also released in India in June 2017.

==== Connectivity ====
The T-Mobile US version of the S8 Active also supports the company's 600 MHz LTE network that was starting to be rolled out at the time the device was announced.

== Keyboard Cover ==
The Samsung Galaxy S8 Keyboard Cover is an accessory for the 2017 smartphone Samsung Galaxy S8 and S8+. It released in early 2017 priced at $59.99, The biggest criticism of the Keyboard Cover was the navigation buttons switching to default everytime you use the case. The keyboard is also default to QWERTY Keyboard.

The Keyboard Cover does not use Bluetooth, saving battery life. With the Keyboard Cover installed, the visible portion of the screen shrinks, but the word prediction is still available from the screen. In March 2017, details of the Samsung DeX station, official Samsung QI wireless charger, and the Keyboard Cover were leaked.

== Background ==
The S8 and S8+ were one of the very few phone models on the market that offered built-in support for a physical keyboard, thus competing for a market held almost exclusively by BlackBerry at the time. For these models, Samsung offered a specialty plastic case which featured a clip-on QWERTY keyboard that could be removed or added by the user at will. While not in use, the keyboard could be clipped to the back of the case. When in use, the OS detected the keyboard and adjusted the screen size and proportions accordingly, so that other software could be used normally. The keyboard model was EJ-CG950BBEGWW for the S8 and EJ-CG955BBEGWW for the S8+.

The Galaxy S8 is one of the first smartphones to support Bluetooth 5, supporting new capabilities such as connecting two wireless headphones to the device at once. It is also bundled with Harman AKG earbuds. Both smartphones have improved satellite navigation over the predecessors by including Galileo receivers.

=== Software ===
The Galaxy S8 launched with the Android 7.0 "Nougat" operating system with the proprietary Samsung Experience (formerly TouchWiz) user interface and software suite. The software features a suite of assistant functions known as "Bixby", which is designed primarily to interact with Samsung's bundled applications and other supported services. The feature allows the use of voice commands to perform phone functions, can generate cards shown on a home screen page (replacing the Flipboard integration formerly featured) based on a user's interactions, and perform searches utilizing object recognition via the camera. The devices received 2 years of major Android OS updates and 2 additional years of security updates for a total of 4 years worth of updates.

Bixby supports third-party integration via an SDK. The S8 supports the use of a docking station known as Samsung DeX to access a PC-like desktop environment on an external display, with support for mouse and keyboard input. On 21 April 2017, coinciding with the phone's official retail date, reports surfaced that the default music player on the Galaxy S8 would be Google Play Music, continuing a trend that started with the S7 in 2016. However, for the S8, Samsung partnered with Google to incorporate additional exclusive features into the app, including the ability to upload up to 100,000 tracks to the service's cloud storage, an increase from the 50,000 tracks users are normally allowed to upload. Additionally, new users get a three-month free trial of the service, the same as given to users who purchase Google's own Pixel smartphone. Furthermore, Google stated that more Samsung-exclusive features will be added to the app in the future, and that the Bixby assistant will also be supported by the app. Bixby replaces S Voice, the voice recognition technology previously found in Samsung Galaxy models.

In May 2017, Google announced that the Galaxy S8 and S8+ will support the company's Daydream virtual reality platform after Samsung rolls out a software update scheduled for mid-2017. In July 2017, Verizon began rolling out an update for its devices, with support for Daydream. The Galaxy S8 was one of the first Android phones to support ARCore, Google's augmented reality engine.

In February 2018, the official Android 8.0 "Oreo" update began rolling out to all versions of the Samsung Galaxy S8. This update was bundled with Samsung Experience 9.

In February 2019, the official Android 9 "Pie" update was released for the Galaxy S8 family. This marked the switch from Samsung Experience to One UI.

The Galaxy S8 and S8+ reached its end of life in May 2021 with the April 2021 security patch while the S8 Active continues to receive monthly security updates for the next six months.

==== Custom ROMs ====
Some models of the Galaxy S8 series allow for bootloader unlocking and custom ROMs installs, and as a result the phone can be made to run One UI 3.1, based on Android 11, unofficially possible. The series can also be updated to Android 12 with the degoogled /e/OS. This device can also unofficially run OneUI 6.1.

== Reception ==
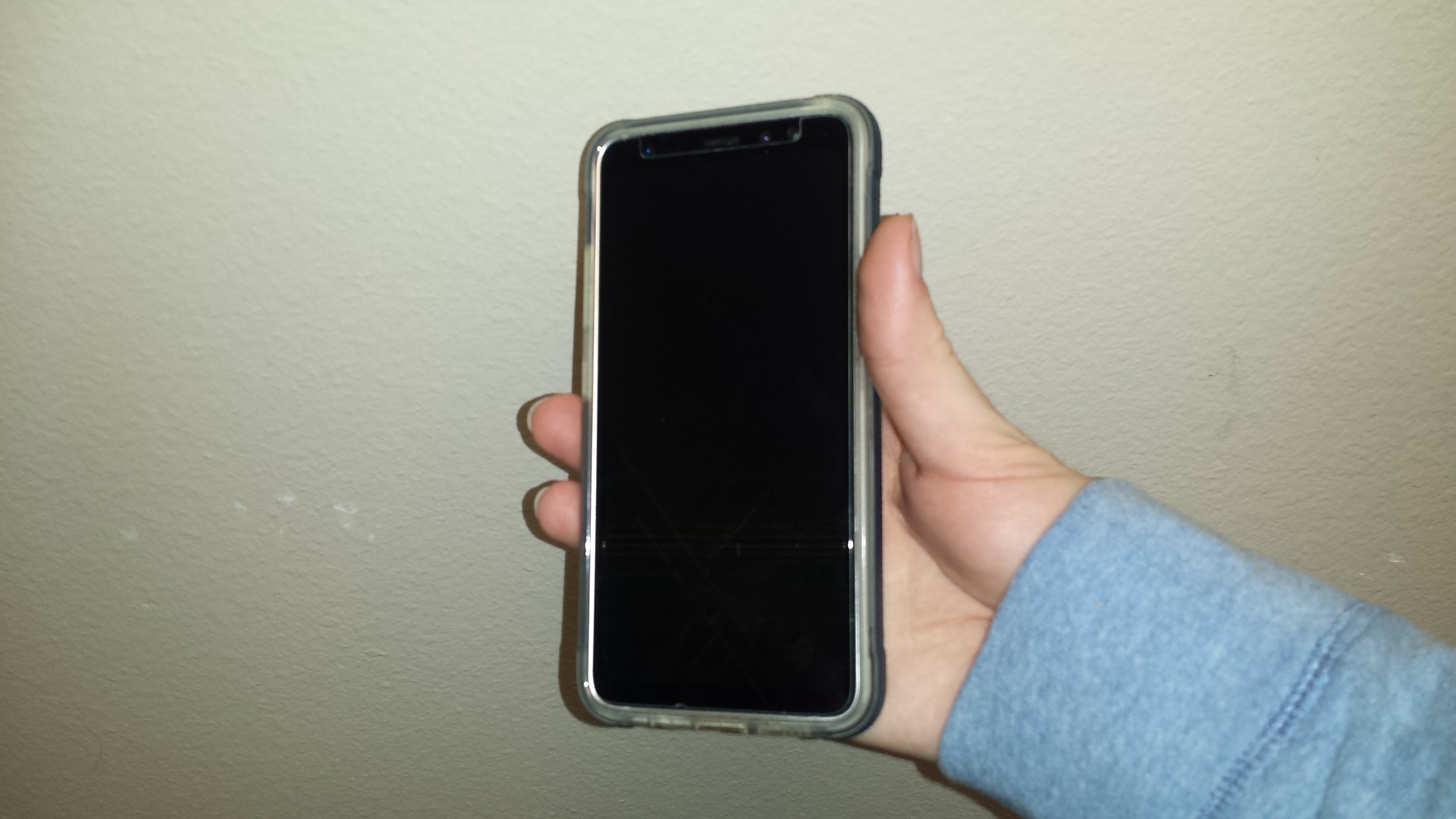
The S8 Active, released in August 2017, is a rugged version of the S8. The one shown here has a case and screen protector installed.

Dan Seifert of The Verge praised the design of the Galaxy S8, describing it as a "stunning device to look at and hold" that was "refined and polished to a literal shine", and adding that it "truly doesn't look like any other phone you might have used before". The hardware of the device was described as "practically flawless". Seifert also liked the new software, writing that "Samsung is known less for polish and more for clumsiness. In a refreshing change of pace, the software on the S8 is, dare I say, good [sic]". However, he criticized the Bixby assistant, writing that "in its current state, it doesn't do much at all", and also criticized the number of duplicate apps. Regarding performance, he wrote that the S8 was "fast and responsive, but so is virtually every other premium phone you can buy, and the S8 isn’t noticeably faster or quicker than a Google Pixel, LG G6, or iPhone 7". Fellow Verge reporter Vlad Savov felt that the placement of the fingerprint sensor was "a perplexing decision if we consider it as a deliberate design choice", but noted reports from Korea claiming that Samsung had originally intended for the fingerprint reader to be built directly into the screen, but was unable to reach a desirable implementation in time for release. The Verge wrote that "Samsung’s six-month-old S8 has cutting edge features and design with fewer issues than other Android phones" like the Google Pixel 2 and LG V30, and that the "OLED screen stretches to the edges of the device and curves on its sides in an almost liquid fashion. It makes the S8 look just as fresh today as it did when it debuted", and pointing out that the S8's popularity and carrier support guaranteed plenty of third-party accessories.

Chris Velazco of Engadget similarly praised the design, stating that "from their rounded edges to their precisely formed metal-and-glass bodies, they feel like smaller, sleeker versions of the Galaxy Note 7", and also praised the display as being simply "awesome". Velazco also praised the software, calling Samsung's added interface "subtle and thoughtful in its design choices". While noting that the Bixby assistant wasn't ready yet, he did compliment the promised voice features as being more granular than those offered through Siri or Google Assistant, and wrote that "With that kind of complexity involved, maybe it's no surprise this stuff isn't done yet". Also praising performance and the camera, though noting that "The 12-megapixel sensors on the back haven't changed much since last year. That's not a bad thing since they were great cameras to start with", Velazco summarized his review by writing that the devices "aren't perfect, but they're as close as Samsung has ever gotten". Brandon Russell of TechnoBuffalo claimed that the camera could not beat Google's Pixel smartphone.

Ron Amadeo of Ars Technica noted that the device's unusual aspect ratio resulted in pillarboxing when watching 16:9 video without zooming or stretching it. He complimented the feel of the S8, calling it "perfected", but criticized the glass back for being "more fragile" and that "Glossy, slippery glass doesn't feel as good in your hand as metal does, either. For the top-tier premium price tag, we'd prefer Samsung to put in the extra work and use a metal back". He criticized the biometric options for unlocking the phones, writing that "There's an iris scanner, a fingerprint reader, and face unlock. The problem is none of them are any good", and also criticized duplicate apps, writing that "most of which can't be removed and aren't very compelling". Additionally, he criticized Bixby, calling it "an odd addition" due to the phone's Google Assistant functionality already present.

Before the phone's official announcement, reports suggested that Bixby would support "7-8 languages" at launch. Later reports after the phone's announcement clarified that Bixby would only support Korean and American English languages at its release, though noting that more languages would be coming "in the following months". In mid-April, The Wall Street Journal reported that Bixby would be launched without support for American English. On 19 July 2017, Samsung announced that Bixby had begun rolling out to Galaxy S8 users in the United States.

== Sales ==
The Samsung Galaxy S8 and Galaxy S8+ broke pre-order records in South Korea, with more than 720,000 units booked in one week, a notable increase from the 100,000 units of the Galaxy S7 and 200,000 units of the Note 7. By mid-April, the number had increased to one million pre-orders. On 24 April 2017, Samsung announced that sales of the Galaxy S8 was its "best ever". Although it did not release specific sales numbers, it announced that sales of the S8 were 30% higher year-over-year than the Galaxy S7. Subsequent reports in May announced that Samsung had sold over five million units. Jon Fingas of Engadget wrote that, although Samsung advertised its pre-order records, sales comparisons to other models on the market were difficult due to unannounced sales figures.

== Issues ==
=== White balance ===
Prior to the official release, it was reported that some Galaxy S8 displays had a bad white balance, causing them to exhibit a reddish tint. Samsung stated that the Galaxy S8 was "built with an adaptive display that optimizes the color range, saturation, and sharpness depending on the environment", but noted that the device's operating system provides settings for manually adjusting the display's appearance and white balance. On 21 April, Samsung stated that the red tinting was purely a software issue, and would be patched in a future update. The Investor reported that Samsung would replace the affected devices if a software update did not fix the issue. Updates in various regions started rolling out in early May, fixing the issue.

=== Random restarts ===
Reports surfaced at the end of April 2017 that some Galaxy S8 devices were "restarting by themselves". Samsung has not yet commented on the issue.

=== Insecure facial recognition ===
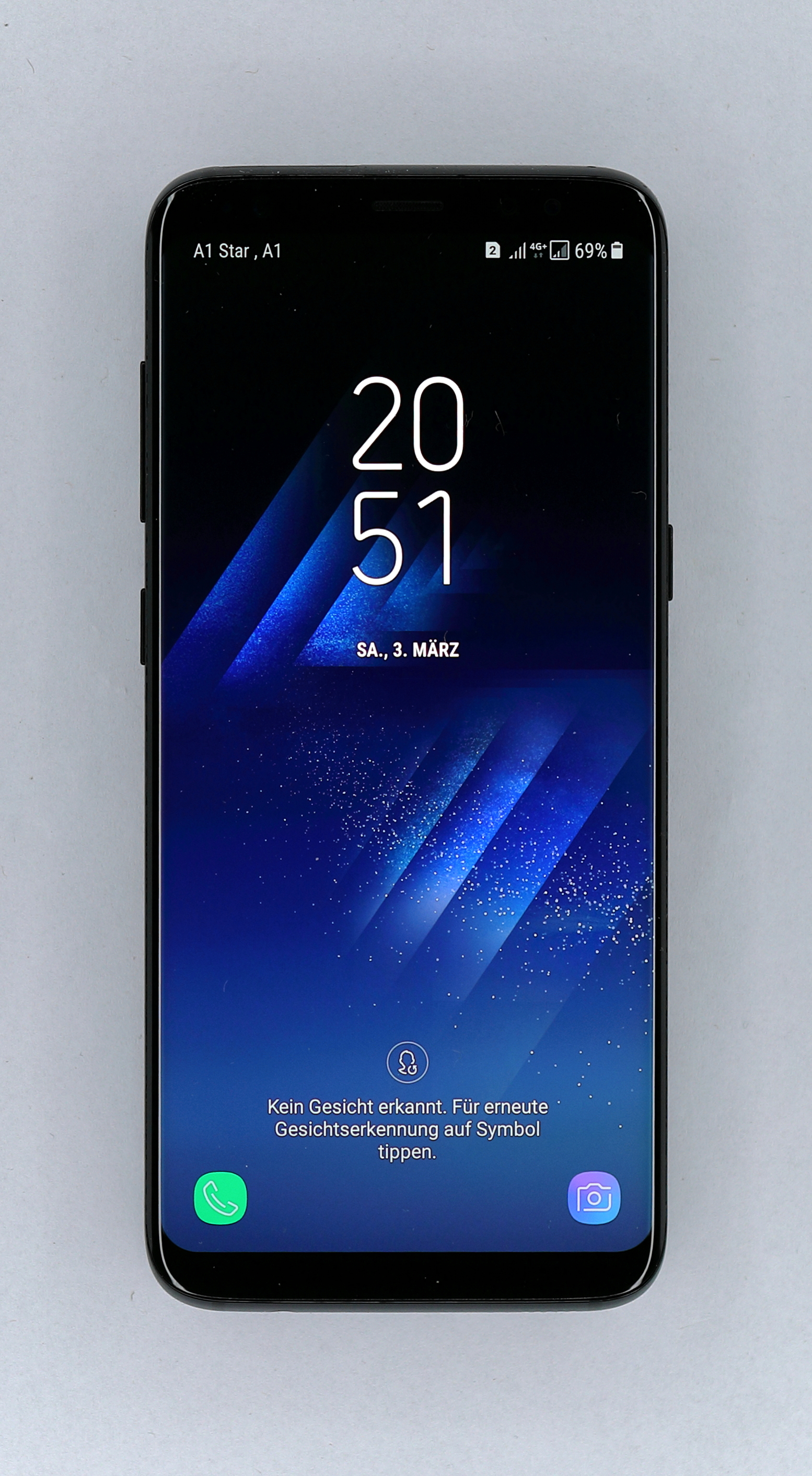
Facial recognition screen

Shortly after the phone's unveiling, bloggers produced a video showing that the Galaxy S8's facial recognition scanner could be tricked to unlock the phone by showing it a photo of the user. In a statement to Business Insider, a Samsung spokesperson stated that "Facial recognition is a convenient action to open your phone – similar to the 'swipe to unlock' action. We offer the highest level of biometric authentication – fingerprint and iris – to lock your phone and authenticate access to Samsung Pay or Secure Folder".

=== Insecure iris recognition ===
In May 2017, researchers from the Chaos Computer Club posted a video showing that the S8's iris recognition system can be fooled with a contact lens and a suitable photograph of an eye. Samsung told BBC News that it was "aware of the issue", and stated that "If there is a potential vulnerability or the advent of a new method that challenges our efforts to ensure security at any time, we will respond as quickly as possible to resolve the issue".

=== SMS message reception failures ===
In October 2017, Galaxy S8 users reported on Reddit that they were unable to receive SMS messages, with no fix available and without any comment from Samsung.

== See also ==
- Comparison of Samsung Galaxy S smartphones
- Samsung Galaxy S series

Preceded by Samsung Galaxy S7	Samsung Galaxy S8; 2017	Succeeded by Samsung Galaxy S9
