= Whereabouts Deluxe =

Utility software

- Screenshot of version 1.1, showing the default "Out to Lunch" message
- Original author: Samer Ramadan
- Developer: TriSoft (formerly ArtSoft)
- Release: 1989; 37 years ago
- Operating system: Windows, DOS
- Type: Utility, screensaver
- License: Proprietary

Whereabouts Deluxe, originally named Whereabouts, is a utility software suite released in 1989 for DOS and Microsoft Windows. It allows users to display a graphical message on their monitor showing visitors and bystanders where the user currently is or will be located while they are away. It was developed by TriSoft, Inc. (formerly ArtSoft, Inc.), a small business based in Marlborough, Massachusetts (later Austin, Texas). It received positive reviews from technology journalists.

== Features ==
Whereabouts Deluxe allows users to display a graphical message on their monitor showing visitors and passersby where the user currently is located while they are away. The software suite was released in two volumes, each featuring eleven messages with playful cartoon graphics (some featuring animation) representing the current location of the user. Most of these messages, including "In the Copy Room", "Out to Lunch", "On a Coffee Break", and "On Vacation", are standalone and require no further customization; other messages, such as "Back At..." and "Call Me at Extension...", have blank fields that the user must fill out before they can be displayed. Up to two lines of text can be added to these customizable messages. To prevent screen burn-in, the user can set the message to fade out after a given interval before it displays an animated screensaver depicting a sleeping desktop computer.

By pressing the space bar on the message, visitors can optionally leave a typed message for the user to read after they have returned to their computer. Users can print these messages or save them to disk. These messages are protected by a password set by the user, preventing visitors from reading ones left by others. This same password can also be set to lock the entire screen. Additionally, a setting in Whereabouts Deluxe allows the user to set the software to execute first in AUTOEXEC.BAT, preventing casual bystanders from tampering with the user's computer by attempting to reboot it to get to the underlying operating system.

A scheduler utility allows the software to run as a terminate-and-stay-resident (TSR) program, changing the message and associated graphic dynamically based on the time of day, in case the user is visiting multiple locations. The same utility can be used to run other applications automatically at a given time, for example, to clear out email inboxes.

Whereabouts Deluxe was developed for DOS, requiring a minimum of version 2.1 of IBM DOS or MS-DOS. It supports an original IBM Personal Computer or compatible with 640 KB of RAM. It is capable of running with a variety of graphics cards, including Hercules, CGA, EGA, and VGA. A PIF allows the software to integrate with Windows.

== Development ==
Whereabouts Deluxe was developed by TriSoft, Inc., a company originally founded as ArtSoft, Inc., in Marlborough, Massachusetts, by Samer "Sam" Ramadan. Ramadan had previously worked for the Computer Corporation of America (CCA) in Cambridge, Massachusetts, as a marketing manager before quitting in June 1990 to operate TriSoft full-time. Whereabouts Deluxe was the company's first product. The idea for the software came to Ramadan at CCA after noticing a mutual habit of himself and a co-worker constantly being away from their offices at critical times where the two had to meet. Although they would leave sticky notes to each other affixed to their computer monitors in these instances, Ramadan felt a software utility accomplishing the same task would be more useful.

Ramadan published the first version of this software, simply named Whereabouts, from his home business Mouse Artist Software in early 1989. It received positive reviews in PC/Computing and PC Magazine. The success of Whereabouts prompted Ramadan to expand the software's feature set, and in June 1989, he incorporated TriSoft from his Marlborough condominium near Route 20. He was named president along with Eric Livingston. The company had only three employees by September 1990, including Ramadan's wife Sonia who worked as customer support. Despite the company's small stature, 4,500 copies of Whereabouts sold by September 1990. That month, Whereabouts Deluxe was released to the public.

Version 2.0 of Whereabouts Deluxe was published in early 1991. An expansion pack titled Munch Menu was released around the same time, replacing the stock hamburger graphic for the "Out to Lunch" message with alternatives such as pizza, tacos, pasta, or scampi. A German-language version of the software titled Quo Vadis was released in mid-1991, distributed by MSPI GmbH. A network version of Whereabouts allowing users to broadcast their location across a LAN was planned but never released.

Ramadan later moved TriSoft's headquarters to Austin, Texas, sometime in 1991. In August 1991, TriSoft signed a deal with Kenfil Distribution of Van Nuys to distribute Whereabouts Deluxe throughout North America.

== Reception ==
Whereabouts Deluxe received positive reviews from technology journalists. The Globe and Mail's Murray Soupcoff praised the software's versatility. PC Magazine's Barry Simon reported that it became an "integral part" of the magazine's product-testing lab and wrote that it was "fun and useful and will be invaluable in many organizations". Simon held reservation with the text editor feature of the customizable messages, writing that it was primitive and incapable of basic features like word wrapping, and was annoyed by the TriSoft logo that displayed when the TSR program was invoked. MicroTimes's Woody Liswood called it a "useful little program that, in a busy office, can be a great help if you are always running around and are never at your desk to meet visitors". He opined that the graphics were "a little too cutesy after using them for a while. We've got a rather small office and may simply bore easily. In a larger office, with lots of folks busily running around, the screens should stay interesting longer". PC/Computing's David DeJean concurred with Liswood that the graphics had the tendency to be "too cute".
