= Screen fade =

Screen fade may refer to:

- Screen burn-in, a disfigurement of a CRT computer display
- Fade (filmmaking), also known as a fade-out
