= Razzle Dazzle (software) =

Screensaver software

- An example of the visual patterns created by Razzle Dazzle
- Original author: James R. Shiflett
- Developers: MicroTronics; Road Scholar Software
- Release: 1990; 36 years ago
- Written in: x86 assembly, C
- Operating system: Windows, DOS
- Type: Screensaver
- License: Proprietary

Razzle Dazzle, originally named Dazzle, is a screensaver originally developed for DOS by James R. Shiflett. It was first published in 1990 as shareware before being commercially released by Road Scholar Software of Houston, Texas. A successor for Windows named Razzle Dazzle 3D was released in 1994. It was one of the most popular screensavers for DOS and Windows systems of the 1990s.

== Description ==
Razzle Dazzle is a screensaver developed for DOS and Microsoft Windows. Most distributions of the screensaver offer both a standalone DOS executable for manual activation and a terminate-and-stay-resident (TSR) program. As a TSR program, the screensaver remains dormant in memory until a user-defined period of keyboard inactivity is reached, at which point the screensaver runs automatically. On activation, the screensaver generates a series of procedurally animated, highly colorful visual patterns. These patterns frequently include mirrored shapes akin to kaleidoscopes and particle-based simulations designed to resemble fireworks and meteor showers. The screensaver uses a variety of transition effects to cycle between animations, such as fading and dissolving, scrolling, wrapping, and melting. Dazzle supports EGA, VGA, and 8514/A graphics adapters.

== Development and release ==
Razzle Dazzle was originally developed by James R. Shiflett, a computer programmer based in Houston, Texas, who had worked for the Houston Advanced Research Center in The Woodlands, Texas, administering the organization's NEC SX-2 supercomputer since the 1980s. In his free time at night, he developed Dazzle, becoming "a sort of therapy" for him. As he recalled: "I'd do my administrative trick during the day, and at night I'd sit on my computer and think up new algorithms to add to Dazzle". Many of the visual effects in Dazzle were inspired by an explosion scene within an installment of Star Trek that Shiflett had seen during this time. Shiflett programmed Dazzle largely in Turbo C, while some of the image generation code done in x86 assembly. A devout Christian, Shiflett included a small religious message within a splash screen when the user exits Dazzle: "Our Creator, evidenced by our creativity".

Dazzle was first published as shareware in 1990 for US$15 by Shiflett's home business MicroTronics. The original version of Dazzle was developed a standalone DOS executable that had to be launched manually by the user. In 1992, Shiflett signed a deal with Road Scholar Software, a start-up software company based in Houston, to distribute Dazzle commercially at retail stores starting in late 1992. Road Scholar had previously developed a fleet management software platform by the same name in the late 1980s; Dazzle became its second-ever title and established Road Scholar as a software publisher. For its commercial release, Shiflett tweaked Dazzle to support a separate TSR mode. It also gained support for Windows 3.0.

Dazzle (renamed Razzle Dazzle by Road Scholar) sold immensely well for Road Scholar and became one of the most popular screensavers of the 1990s, competing with titles such as After Dark and Johnny Castaway. Even after its commercial release, shareware distribution of Dazzle was still a major source of revenue for Shiflett, bringing in between $1,200 and $1,500 per week in late 1993. Road Scholar later released a patch for Razzle Dazzle in summer 1993, allowing the screensaver to work in tandem with QEMM after users reported that the screensaver failed to activate and the keyboard froze after the user-defined activation time elapsed. Shortly after, Road Scholar began development of its successor, Razzle Dazzle 3D. Released in 1994, Razzle Dazzle 3D added support for Windows NT 3.1 and added a new mode incorporating 3D graphics and the playback of MIDI music files; it also shipped with the original DOS application.

Miramar Productions, in association with Radio Shack, produced a 45-minute art film based on the Razzle Dazzle screensaver, with score by Jonn Serrie. Entitled Dazzle, it was released on LaserDisc and VHS in fall 1993.

== Reception ==
Dazzle received largely positive reviews from critics. Compute! magazine, reviewing the original DOS version, wrote: "The results are simply beautiful. Everyone who's seen the program has spent many minutes in rapt enjoyment of the effects. I can't recommend the program too highly; I was so smitten myself that I made a videotape of the screen and dubbed in some appropriate music for use as a background relaxation program on TV".
