= Matrix code =

Matrix code may refer to:

- Matrix barcode, two-dimensional barcode, as opposed to linear and stacked symbologies
- Matrix digital rain, or matrix code, the logo of The Matrix franchise
- Matrix (record production), or master, a disc used in the production of phonograph records
  - Matrix number, of a gramophone record
