= 3D Maze =

Screensaver for Microsoft Windows

Screenshot of the 3D Maze Screensaver displaying the Windows 95 start button.

3D Maze is the name given to a screensaver, created in OpenGL, that was present in Microsoft Windows from Windows NT 4.0 until it was discontinued after Windows Me.

== Overview ==
The maze is randomly generated each time, with the "player" navigating through it in first-person, spawning in front of a floating start button. From there, the maze is automatically traversed using the right-hand rule, which will guarantee the maze will eventually be solved because all of the randomly-generated mazes are simply connected (there are no looping paths).

By default, the maze is textured with brick walls, a wooden floor, and an asbestos tile ceiling. Users can customize these textures, swapping them out for animated psychedelic patterns in later versions, or may instead create their own custom textures.

As the maze is traversed, several objects can be found inside it, including floating "OpenGL" logos, images of globes on the walls (which is seen on the cover of the OpenGL Programming Guide), and a 2D sprite image of a rat that is also moving through the maze. Additionally, the "player" will encounter rotating polyhedric gray rocks that, when touched, will flip the camera upside down and turn the floor into the ceiling. When this happens, the "player" will traverse the maze following the left wall rather than the right until the exit is found or another gray rock is encountered, flipping the camera right-side up again.

The exit to the maze is a floating, translucent smiley face. Upon reaching it, the maze will reset and another will be generated. If the maze is completed and reset while upside down, the next maze may be traversed as if it were upside down, hugging the left wall instead of the right.

Users can also enable an overlaid map, which constantly displays the maze using simple vector graphics. On this map, the "player" is represented as a blue triangle, the start as a red triangle, the smiley face as a green triangle, the rocks as rotating white triangles, the OpenGL logos as stationary white triangles, and the rat as an orange triangle.

== Legacy ==
Cornell University's Maze in a Box, a project to create 3D graphics using the Atmel Mega32 microcontroller, used the 3D Maze screensaver as inspiration. In 2017, independent video game developer Cahoots Malone made Screensaver Subterfuge, a video game based on the screensaver created using assets from the original ssmaze.scr file.

XScreenSaver 5.39, released in April 2018, includes a Maze3D module written by "Sudoer" that replicates the Windows screensaver.

== Reception ==
Writing for Bustle, Jessica Blankenship was unable to recall anything that was as "mesmerizing, alluring, frustrating, and exquisite" as getting lost in the 3D Maze screensaver. Slate's Jacob Brogan called the screensaver a "harried, first-person rush through a brick-walled labyrinth" likening it to an "intelligence at work" and went on to compare watching it to watching one's grandparents play Wolfenstein 3D "while sitting in silence as they haplessly mashed the keypad".
