= DVD screensaver =

Screensaver present on DVD players

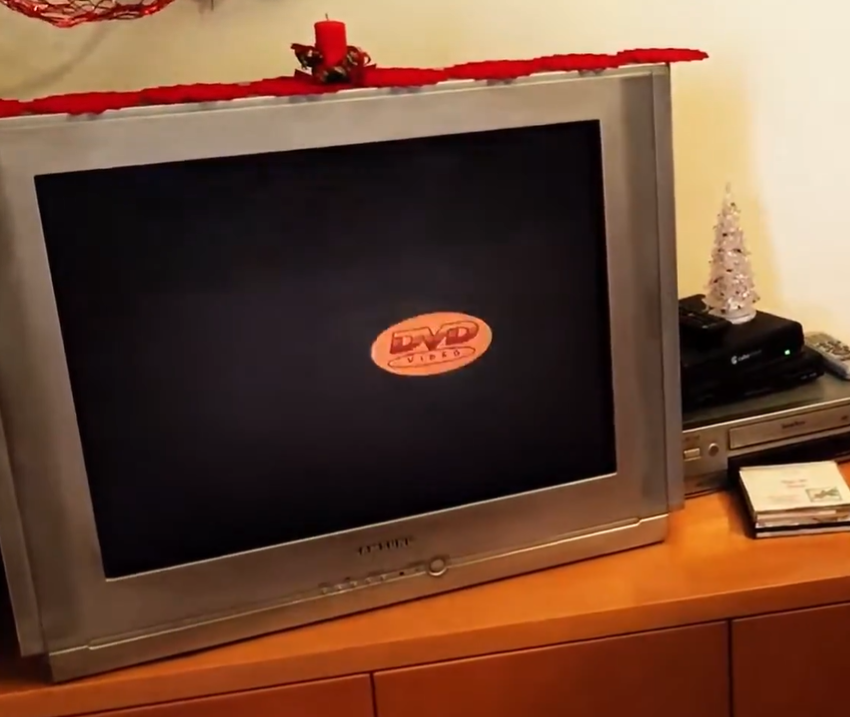
The screensaver playing on a CRT television

Animation of a DVD logo screensaver

The DVD screensaver, also known as the DVD logo screensaver or bouncing DVD logo, is the screensaver present on DVD players. It depicts the DVD-Video logo on a black background, slowly bouncing around the screen. It is a popular challenge to wait for the logo to precisely hit one of the corners of the screen.

== Overview ==
The screensaver is built into DVD players and activates once the player enters its idle or sleep state. It depicts the DVD-Video logo bouncing around a black background. As the logo moves, it ricochets off the edges of the screen, which changes the direction on each collision. Some iterations have the color of the logo change when it collides. Like most screensavers, the logo's bouncing motion is used to prevent screen burn-in on connected display devices.

== Legacy ==
The event when the DVD logo precisely hits the corner of the screen has been described as "burst of happiness". KSL noted that audiences would watch "hoping that the bouncing logo would hit the corner of the screen perfectly". Mathematical analysis estimated on how long the logo goes before hitting the corner have ranged anywhere from 2 to 45 minutes based on a number of different variables.

There have been multiple livestreams of the screensaver on YouTube, such as one created by user FlareTV and another that reportedly had its logo hit the corner 12 out of 6849 times as of 2018. There have also been websites that host their own recreation of it, such as BouncingDVDLogo.com.

== In popular culture ==
- The Office episode "Launch Party" opens with Michael Scott giving a meeting on quarterly reports. It shows everyone being interested in the meeting until it is revealed that everyone there was watching the DVD screensaver behind him. On an episode of the podcast Office Ladies, it is revealed that the DVD logo was edited in after filming.
- In 2021, an Easter egg was added to Google Search, where the Google logo in the top left corner will start bouncing around the screen if the search term "DVD screensaver" is entered.
- In 2022, cryptocurrency exchange company Coinbase parodied the screensaver for a Super Bowl commercial, replacing the DVD logo with a QR code to their website.
- Also in 2022, musical comedian Jazz Emu released "Still Waiting" in the album "Digital Spool", describing his need for the "cheeky little DVD logo" to hit the corner of his TV.
- In the 2025 game Stimulation Clicker, the DVD screensaver is the first unlockable item in the game. The player gains a single point for every bounce and multiple can be purchased.
- In September 2025, YouTuber Grant Davis created a Lego television with a DVD screensaver that moved on its screen using Technic gears and motors.

== See also ==
- Roku City
- Screensaver
