= Muppets Inside =

1996 video game

The Muppet CD-ROM: Muppets Inside
- Developer: Starwave
- Publisher: Starwave
- Director: David Gumpel
- Producers: John Cutter; Ritamarie Peruggi
- Designer: John Cutter
- Artists: Joan Delehanty; Derek Brown
- Writer: Craig Shemin
- Platform: Windows
- Release: NA: March 1996
- Genre: Adventure
- Mode: Single-player

The Muppet CD-ROM: Muppets Inside is a 1996 video game based on The Muppets franchise produced by Starwave for Windows. The title is a play on Intel's advertising slogan, "Intel Inside". The game's plot consists of several Muppets characters getting trapped inside a computer, and Bunsen sending Kermit and Fozzie Bear into the computer to rescue them.

Muppets Inside's gameplay contains over an hour of new audio and video footage, as well as five new songs and classics from The Muppet Show. The game also contains a bonus "Muppetizer'" feature that provides custom cursors, sounds and wallpapers. The game's CD-ROM also came packaged with a 6x6 inch, 30-page booklet with Henson history, character profiles, game instructions, and credits.

== Gameplay ==
As players rescue the Muppets, they encounter seven "Muppetized" minigames:

- Kitchens of Doom: A parody of Doom, with the Swedish Chef fighting giant vegetables in a crypt-like kitchen.
- Beaker's Brain: The player helps Bunsen unscramble Beaker's memories of Muppet Show clips.
- Two Thumbs Down: The player rotates boxes to unscramble Statler and Waldorf's video clip.
- A Wocka on the Wild Side: In a parody of Missile Command, the player shoots down flying tomatoes that the audience throws at Fozzie Bear as he crosses the Muppet Theater stage.
- Death Defying Acts of Culture: The player positions Gonzo's cannon so he flies through a target.
- Scope That Song: Clifford hosts a version of Name That Tune, with the songs played by Lew Zealand's fish or Marvin Suggs and the Muppaphone.
- Trivial but True: A Hollywood Squares game hosted by Kermit, with Fozzie Bear as the center square.

== Development and release ==
Starwave was the lead developer of Muppets Inside, and supporting developers produced its minigames: Trivial but True and Death Defying Acts of Culture by Socha Computing; Kitchens of Doom by Gravity; A Wocka on the Wild Side and Two Thumbs Down by Randy Pratt; and Beaker's Brain and Scope That Song by Riedel Software Productions. The game was developed in a year, with a headcount of over 150 people between all involved studios.

The full-motion video sequences for the game were shot in London, concurrently with the Muppet Treasure Island film and its video game adaptation.

Muppets Inside was initially slated for release in January 1996. However, the game would not arrive in stores until March of that year.

== Reception ==
Reception

Review scores
Publication	Score
PC Gamer (US)	88%
Entertainment Weekly	A

Muppets Inside was received positively by critics upon release. CNET praised the game's graphics and design, describing it as a "day-brightener".

In a retrospective review, PC Gamer praised the humor of the videos and game concepts, while criticizing the tedium of the small number of games.

Muppets Inside was named one of the top 100 CD-ROMs by PC Magazine.

=== Awards ===
Muppets Inside received a CODiE award in 1997 for Best Overall Multimedia Production. The editors of Computer Games Strategy Plus nominated the game as their pick for 1996's best "traditional" game, but the award ultimately went to Power Chess.
