= Music Screeners =

Magneto-optical storage medium, mainly for audio (1992–2013)

- Media type: Floppy disk
- Developed by: Sony
- Usage: Screen savers
- Released: 5 September 1995
- Discontinued: 1996

Music Screeners is a series of interactive music video themed screen savers distributed in floppy disk format by Sony in 1995. The software allowed users to play and set short videos from Sony Music recording artists as screen savers on their desktop. Upon release, the software received mixed reviews, with critics faulting the quality of the software and its premise. Contemporary sources have cited Music Screeners as an example of early commercial distribution of music multimedia on the floppy disk format.

== Features ==
Music Screeners were distributed as 3.5" floppy disks containing a 35 to 40 second clips of the featured artist, and software to play the clip as a screen saver. Users could select one of six different effects for the screen saver's presentation, and combine with other Music Screeners videos using a "virtual carousel" if multiple were installed. The disk also featured additional content, including two interactive games including a matching game and Tetris-like game. The Music Screeners software included 21 releases. Featured artists included music videos from Alice in Chains, Babyface, Cyndi Lauper, Gloria Estefan, Harry Connick Jr., Indigo Girls, James Taylor, Mariah Carey, Michael Bolton, Michael Jackson, Stevie Ray Vaughan, The The, and Toad The Wet Sprocket.

== Development ==
Sony developed the Music Screeners line in partnership with Minneapolis based developer Windows Painters Ltd as an attempt to bridge the markets of computer software and music. The series was launched with 21 different products on September 5, 1995. To facilitate marketing for the product, Sony distributed a cardboard display which it shipped to music store retailers with the product. Plans were made, if the series were successful, to distribute Music Screeners on CD-ROM.

== Reception ==
Reception of the software was mixed, with distributors expressing varied opinions about the product; while Camelot Music representatives expressed excitement, a Tower Records spokesperson felt the series were "a little expensive for an impulse item". Computer Game Review stated the disks and their screen savers were redundant, finding the screen savers "all look like they were inspired by MTV cutaways and montage editing" and the extra games were "only passable" additions. Describing the software as shovelware, Newsweek wrote that "the product just isn't very good", critiquing its "grainy video" and "lame" games. Rolling Stone retrospectively cited Music Screeners as an example of early distribution of music on floppy disk. Author Michael Tau of Extreme Music described the series as a "cash grab" and "short-lived gimmick" reflecting early attempts to promote music using the floppy disk format.

== See also ==
- Screen saver
