= Lock screen =

Computer user interface element

A lock screen is a computer user interface element used by various operating systems. They regulate immediate access to a device by requiring the user to perform a certain action in order to receive access, such as entering a password, using a certain button combination, or performing a certain gesture using a device's touchscreen. There are various authentication methods to get past the lock screen, with the most popular and common ones being personal identification numbers (PINs), the Android pattern lock, and biometrics (e.g. Touch ID and facial recognition).

Depending on the operating system and device type, a lock screen can range from a simple login screen, to an overview screen with the current date and time, weather, recent notifications, playback controls for media being played in the background (typically music), shortcuts to applications (such as the camera), and optionally, the contact information of the device's owner (which can be used if the device is lost or stolen, or during a medical emergency).

== Lock screens by platform ==
=== Mobile operating systems ===
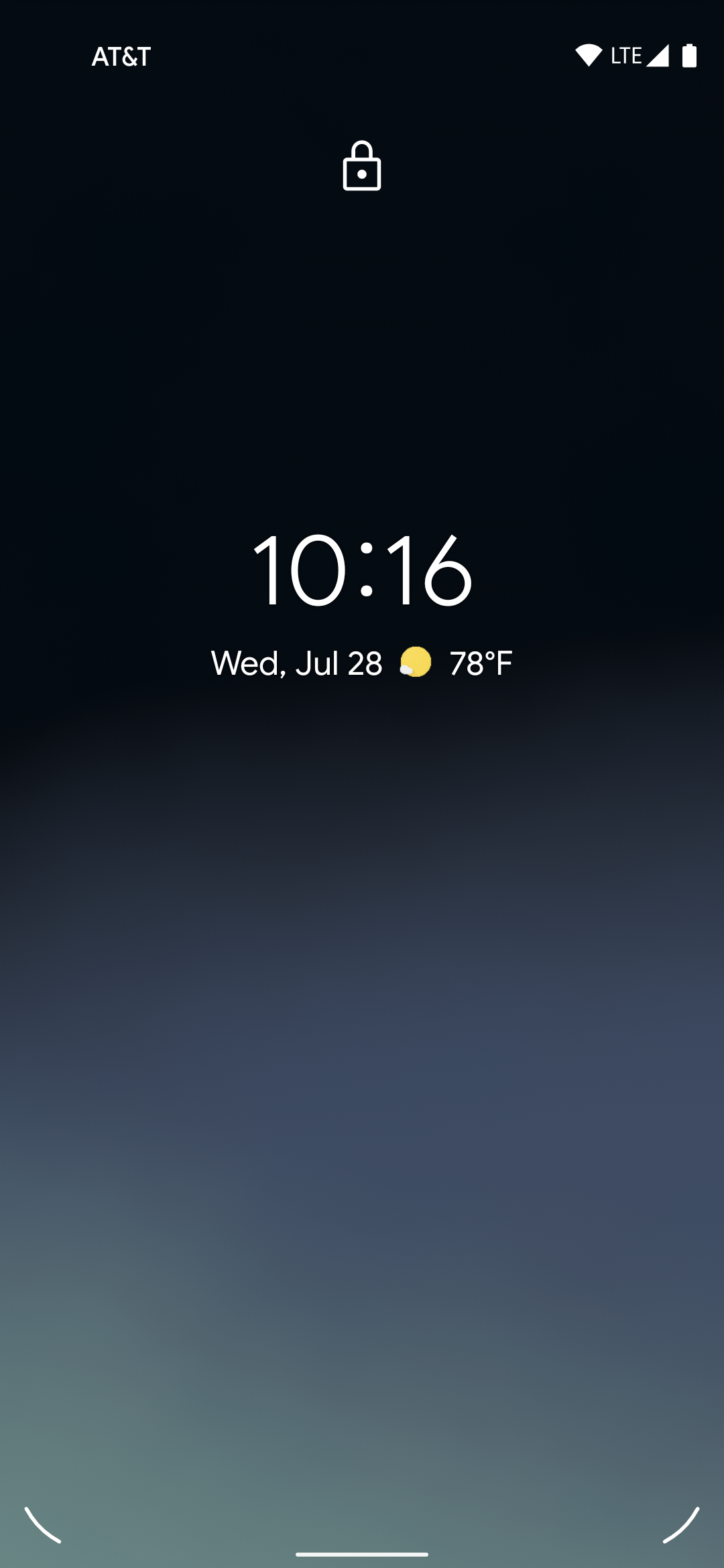
Android 11's lock screen. The device is unlocked by swiping up from the bottom.

Mobile operating systems that run on smartphones and tablets typically use a gesture based lock-screen. Phones manufactured by Neonode were unlocked by swiping right on the touchscreen. Apple's iOS, used by the iPhone and iPad lines, utilized a similar unlock mechanism until iOS 10, with an on-screen slider slid to the right. Beginning on iOS 5, sliding in the other direction sends the user directly to the camera app. On iOS 7, the slider widget was removed as part of a larger overhaul of the iOS interface, and users could now swipe from any point on the screen. The lock screen also displays a clock, notifications, and provides audio playback controls. iOS 10 made major changes to the lock screen, replacing the sliding gesture with pressing the Home button. Swiping is still used to access the camera, as well as an additional page to the left with widgets. As the iPhone X and iPad Pro do not have physical home buttons, the user must swipe upwards from the bottom of the screen instead.

At first, Android did not use a gesture-based lock screen, electing to require the user to press the phone's Menu button. On Android 2.0, a new gesture-based lock screen was introduced, displaying two icons: one for unlocking the phone, and one for setting the volume mode, activated by dragging the relevant icon to the center of the screen on a curve (similarly to a rotary dial). On Android 2.1, the rotary dial was replaced by two tabs on either end of the screen. Android 3.0 introduced a new design: a ball with a padlock icon is dragged outside a circular area. On 4.0, the option to unlock straight to the camera is provided, while 4.1 adds the ability to unlock into a Google Search screen by dragging up. Android 4.2 makes additional changes to the lock screen, allowing users to add widgets to pages accessible on the lock screen by swiping from the left edge of the screen. The camera is accessed similarly by swiping from the right edge of the screen. Android also allows devices to be locked using either a password, passcode, a pattern on a grid of 9 circles, fingerprint sensing, or facial recognition.

Android distributions by other manufacturers typically use different lock screen designs than what stock Android utilizes; some versions of HTC's Sense used a metallic ring dragged from the bottom of the screen to unlock the phone, and also allows users to launch apps by dragging their respective shortcut icon into the ring instead. On Samsung devices, the lock screen involves dragging in any direction from any location on the screen (TouchWiz Nature devices, such as the Galaxy S III and S4, are also accompanied by a visual effect, such as a pond ripple or lens flare); similarly to HTC's lock screen, app shortcuts can be dragged up from the bottom of the screen to unlock directly into them.

=== PC operating systems ===
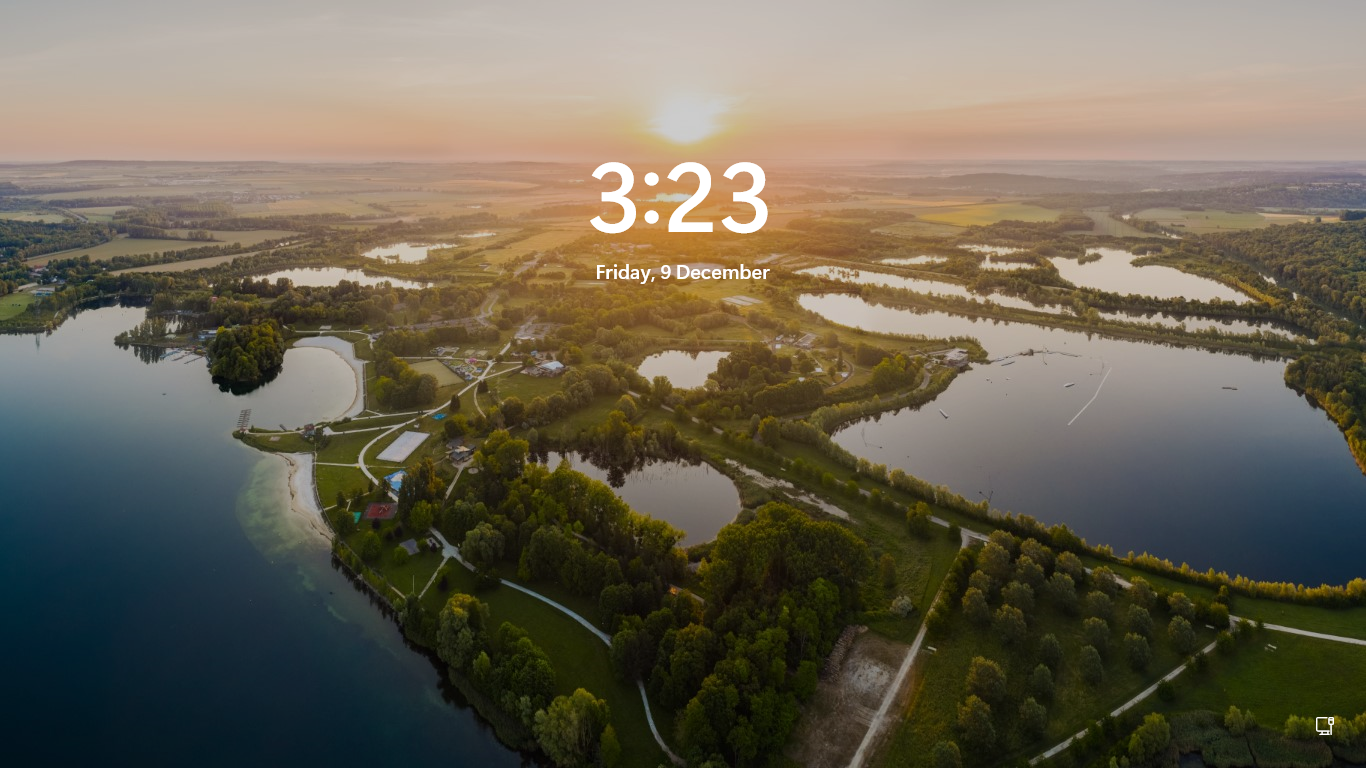
Windows 11's lock screen

Windows NT has offered the ability for users to "lock" their computers by displaying a login window, which requires the active user's password to regain access to the system. Since Windows XP, the lock function has also been bound to the keyboard shortcut ⊞ Win+L. On Windows 8, the lock screen was re-designed to closer resemble those used by mobile operating systems; users can choose a distinct wallpaper for use on the lock screen, which now also displays a clock, calendar events, and notifications from other apps. The screen can be dragged upwards with a mouse or touchscreen to unlock the device. Windows 10 maintains this design, whilst adding the ability to use the Cortana voice assistant from the lock screen, and support for slide shows, and the "Windows Spotlight" service to retrieve daily wallpapers and optionally receive advertising and suggestions related to the wallpaper.

Screen locking functionality is also built into screensaver systems on some Unix-like operating systems, such as XScreenSaver and gnome-screensaver.

== Monetization ==
Particularly on Android, custom lock screen software can be designed to replace the default lock screen with one that displays advertising or otherwise sponsored content. Amazon's Android-based Kindle Fire tablets display notifications of "special offers" on its lock screen, unless users purchase a more expensive SKU of the device which disables this feature. In 2016, Amazon began marketing discounted smartphones exclusive to Amazon Prime subscribers, subsidized by "special offers" and pre-loaded Amazon apps. In November 2017, Google Play Store prohibited apps from displaying advertisements on the lock screen unless the app is specifically designed to replace the lock screen, citing issues with adware embedded in unrelated apps. The Indian company Glance produces a lock screen replacement that displays a content feed on the lock screen, which is monetized via advertising.

== Patent litigation ==
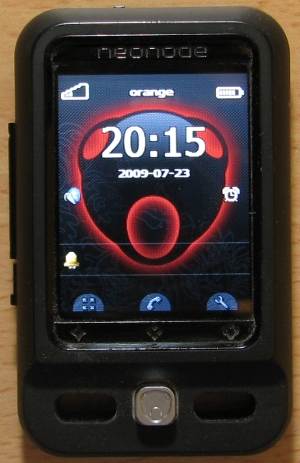
Courts cited mobile phones by Neonode as prior art for Apple's iOS lock screen.

Apple holds several patents related to the sliding lock screen used by its iOS devices: it was granted U.S. patent 7,657,849 in 2010, and U.S. patent 8,046,721 in 2011, describing a system that involves continuously dragging an image to a certain point to unlock the device. As part of ongoing patent wars between numerous companies surrounding patents related to mobile devices, Apple asserted these patents in several patent infringement lawsuits outside the United States with competing vendors.

Apple's lawsuits with Samsung in the Netherlands and HTC in the United Kingdom both led to failure: both courts ruled the patents to be invalid, citing the similar lock screen on the N1, a mobile phone manufactured by the Swedish company Neonode, as prior art for Apple's design. The British court specifically ruled that Apple's lock screen was an "obvious improvement" over that of the Neonode N1 due to its additional visual feedback through an on-screen slider graphic (unlike the N1, which only displayed a written instruction explaining the gesture). Early work on touchscreen technology from the University of Maryland Human – Computer Interaction Lab was also cited as prior art, in particular a 1991 touchscreen slider developed by Catherine Plaisant.

In January 2012, Apple won a permanent injunction from a German court after it ruled that Motorola Mobility violated the patents on some of its recent devices (although the Motorola Xoom tablet was ruled not to have infringed on the patent). However, Apple was warned that it would have been required to put up a bond as insurance if it were to allow the injunction to take effect, and any potential sales ban as a result would be limited to Germany.

== See also ==
- Mobile security
