= Digital rain =

Computer code used in the Matrix movie series

An interpretation of digital rain

Digital rain, or Matrix code, is the visual effect of vertically falling green characters popularized by The Matrix. The image is a way of representing the activity of the simulated reality environment of the Matrix on screen by kinetic typography. The franchise's films, as well as episodes of the spin-off The Animatrix, open with the image. It is a characteristic mark of the franchise, similar to the opening crawl featured in the Star Wars franchise.

== Background ==
In the film, the code that comprises the Matrix itself is frequently represented as downward-flowing green characters. This code uses a custom typeface designed by Simon Whiteley, which includes mirror images of half-width kana characters and Western Latin letters and numerals. In a 2017 interview at CNET, he attributed the design to his wife, who comes from Japan, and added, "I like to tell everybody that The Matrix's code is made out of Japanese sushi recipes"; this has been debunked by several people including some well known Japanese influencers.

The effect resembles that of older generation green screen displays of monochrome phosphorescent computer monitors. One predecessor of the digital rain exists in a "code-scene" of András Mész's film, Meteo. Ghost in the Shell, a strong influence on The Matrix, features opening credits similar to the digital rain.

No official version of the code's typeface actually used in the Matrix trilogy and in the website for the game Path of Neo has been released. Several imitations have been made, mostly in the form of screensavers.

== Cultural impact ==
A screensaver named GLMatrix in XScreenSaver representing the digital rain

Dutch musician Arjen Anthony Lucassen named a track "Digital Rain", in honor of the movie, on his 2010 album Victims of the Modern Age by his band Star One.

The effect also inspired the creation of many unofficial Matrix screensavers, including the "GL Matrix" mode in XScreenSaver, and in the cmatrix program for Unix-like systems.

== See also ==
- Monochrome monitor
- Simulated reality
