= John Socha =

American software developer (born 1958)

John Socha-Leialoha (born 1958) is a software developer best known for creating Norton Commander, the first orthodox file manager, for MS-DOS, and for creating the first computer screensaver.

John grew up in Wisconsin, earned a BS degree in Electrical Engineering from University of Wisconsin–Madison, and his PhD in Applied Physics from Cornell University.

Starting in September 2010, John began working at Microsoft officially.

== Independent work ==
In the early days of the IBM PC, John Socha wrote a column for the now defunct magazine Softalk, where he published such programs as ScrnSave, KbdBuffer (extending the keyboard buffer), and Whereis (finding files on a hard disk).

ScrnSave was the first screensaver ever created for computers. John Socha also coined the term screen saver. The built-in screensaver (night sky with stars) was one of the most distinctive features of Norton Commander, along with the two-panel blue screen.

When Peter Norton Computing was acquired by Symantec in 1990, John Socha left to found his own company, Socha Computing. The company developed the Microsoft Plus! add-on pack for Windows 95, screensavers for Windows 98, and two minigames for the 1996 video game Muppets Inside. In August 1997, Socha Computing was acquired by Asymetrix.

Since October 2003, John has devoted himself to his long-standing hobby of model railroading. He is co-founder of New Rail Models.

In December 2004, John Socha co-authored Optimize Your Pocket PC Development with the .NET Compact Framework for MSDN Magazine.

== Norton Commander ==
I started work on what became known as the Norton Commander in the fall of 1984 while I was still a graduate student in Applied Physics at Cornell University. The first versions were entirely in assembly language, but that was too time-consuming, so I soon switched to a blend of C and assembly language at a time when most "real programmers" wouldn't touch C.

...
At the time I called it Visual DOS, with the abbreviation of VDOS instead of the usual two-letter abbreviations used at the time. The program itself was inspired by several things coming together. I had a contract to write some books for Microsoft Press and actually spent some time in Bellevue, WA working on-site. I'd take two months off from graduate school and write a book.
...

The second book was to be a book of small utility programs like I used to write for Softalk Magazine (such as whereis, scrnsave, etc.), but I never finished writing the book because one small utility took on a life of its own.

— John Socha described his work on NC

John Socha continued work on his VDOS program after joining Peter Norton Computing as their first director of research and development. In 1986 the software product was released under the name of Norton Commander.

Socha also led the development team of Norton Utilities for the Macintosh computer platform.

== Personal life ==
John maintains a YouTube channel on which he discusses small scale CNC machining and injection molding fabrication techniques.

John is a private pilot and owns Daisy, a plane featured in books by Richard Bach.
