= The Investor =

Online news service

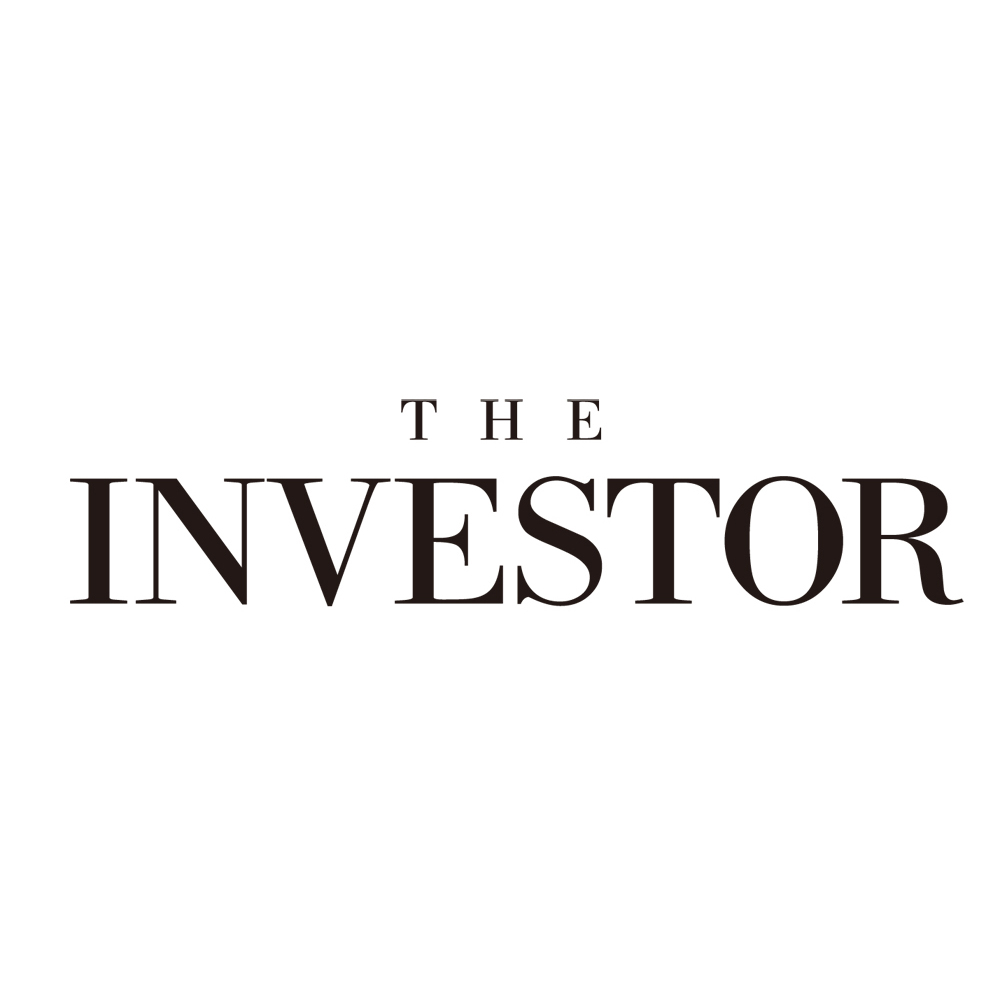
Logo

The Investor is an English-language online business news service launched on June 14, 2016, in Seoul, South Korea.

It was founded by Korean media and lifestyle company Herald Corporation. The Investor's content includes over 100 articles per day, authored by a team consisting of both Korean and international writers affiliated with South Korea's largest English daily, The Korea Herald and its sister Korean publication 헤럴드경제.

The Investor offers real-time regulatory filings, a service previously unavailable in English in South Korea. Additionally, it provides a comprehensive database featuring the personal information and net worth of the 100 wealthiest individuals in Korea, inclusive of the value of their unlisted stocks and real estate holdings. This list is scheduled to be expanded to 300 richest people by 2017.

The service also delivers English reports from research institutes, investment banks, and brokerages.
