= GNOME Screensaver =

GNOME project's official screen banking and locking framework

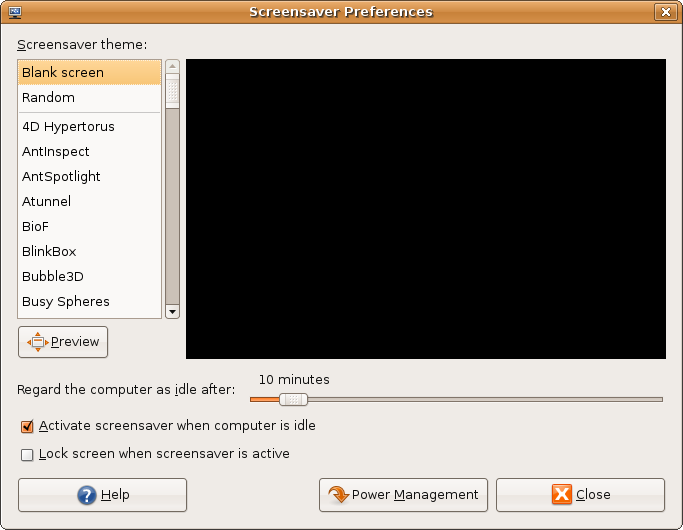
- A screenshot of gnome-screensaver prior to GNOME 3
- Developer: GNOME developers
- Stable release: 3.6.1 / October 16, 2012
- Preview release: 3.5.5 / August 6, 2012
- Operating system: Cross-platform
- Type: Screensaver
- License: GPL
- Website: wiki.gnome.org/Projects/GnomeScreensaver
- Repository: gitlab.gnome.org/Archive/gnome-screensaver

Up until GNOME 3.5, GNOME Screensaver was the GNOME project's official screen blanking and locking framework. With the release of GNOME 3.5.5, screen locking functionality became a function of GDM and GNOME Shell by default.

== History ==
GNOME Screensaver continued to be used by the GNOME Fallback mode until GNOME Fallback was deprecated with the release of GNOME 3.8. GNOME Screensaver continues to be used in the GNOME Flashback session, a continuation of the GNOME Fallback mode. In October 2014, a member of the GNOME Flashback team requested maintainer-ship of GNOME Screensaver which would allow it to officially become part of the GNOME Flashback project.

On some GNOME-based Linux distributions, GNOME Screensaver was used instead of the framework that is a part of XScreenSaver. On these systems, the screen savers themselves still came from the XScreenSaver collection, GNOME Screensaver just provided the interface.

== Interface ==
The GNOME Screensaver interface was designed for improved integration with the GNOME desktop, including themeability, language support, and human interface guidelines compliance. However, it no longer runs any screensavers and is more properly referred to as a screen blanker.

Compared to the front end included with XScreenSaver, GNOME Screensaver has a simplified interface but less customizability. For instance, users may not select which screensavers to select at random – either only one is selected or the program randomly selects from the whole list. In addition, the inability to configure individual screensavers and the developers' response to this issue has been criticized by some users. It also lacks a setting to control cycling through different screensavers.

In GNOME 3, GNOME Screensaver was drastically simplified, supporting only screen blanking and no graphical screensavers.
