= Johnny Castaway =

1992 Windows screensaver

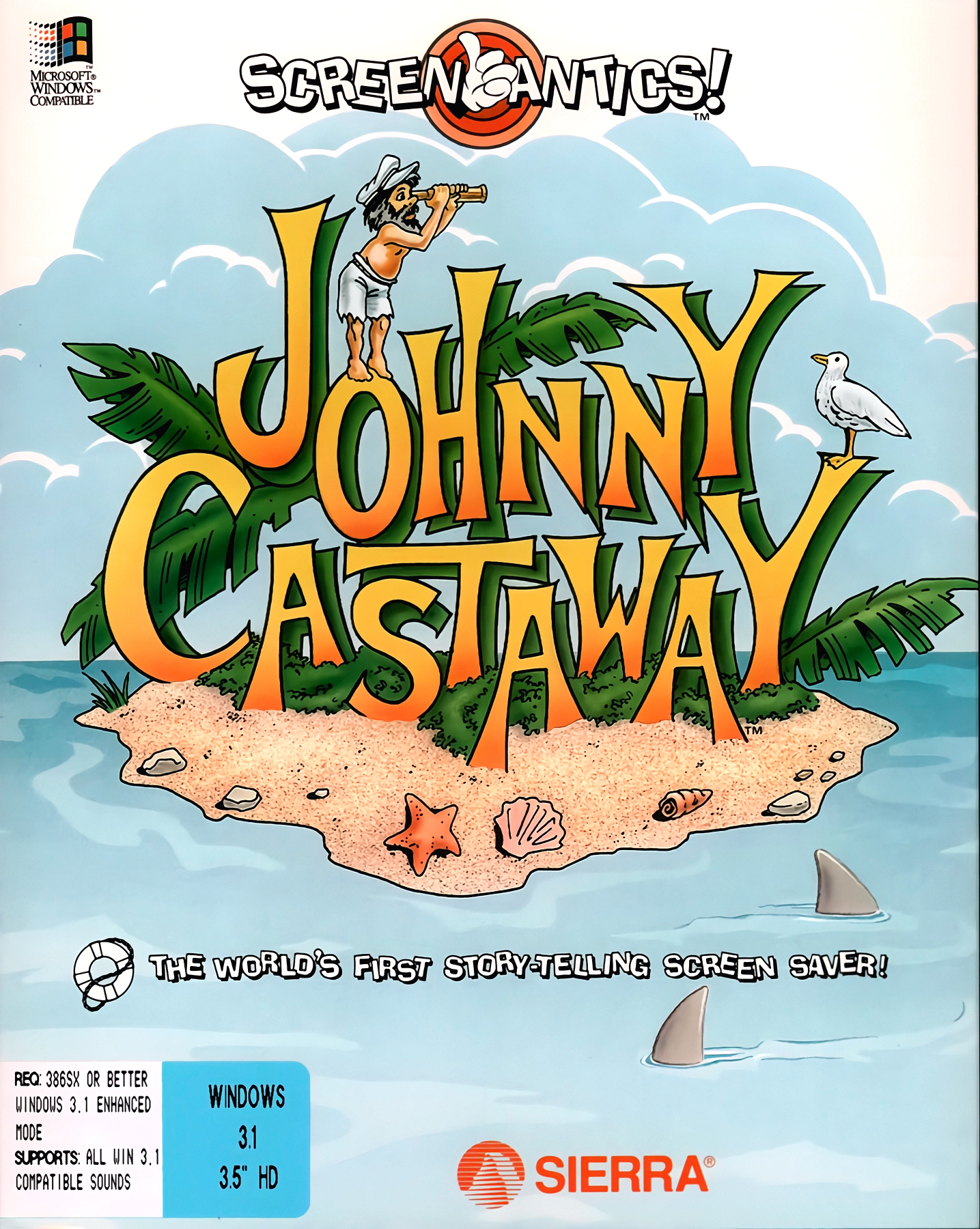
- Cover art
- Developer: Sierra On-Line/Dynamix
- Release: 1992; 34 years ago
- Stable release: 1.02 / 1993; 33 years ago
- Operating system: Windows 3.1
- Type: screensaver

Johnny Castaway is a screensaver released in 1992 by Sierra On-Line/Dynamix, and marketed under the Screen Antics brand as "the world's first story-telling screen saver".

== Description ==
The screensaver depicts a man, Johnny Castaway, stranded on a very small island with a single palm tree. It follows a story which is slowly revealed through time. While Johnny fishes, builds sand castles, and jogs on a regular basis, other events are seen less frequently, such as a mermaid or Lilliputian pirates coming to the island, or a seagull swooping down to steal his shorts while he is bathing. Much like the castaways of Gilligan's Island, Johnny repeatedly comes close to being rescued, but ultimately remains on the island as a result of various unfortunate accidents. He ultimately leaves the island after building a raft, but eventually misses the island and is seen parachuting back to it behind the "The End" title.

"Johnny Castaway" includes Easter eggs for a number of United States holidays such as Saint Patrick's Day, Halloween, Christmas and Independence Day. During these holidays, the scenes are played out as usual except for some detail representing that holiday or event. During the last week of the year, for example, the palm tree will sport a "Happy New Year" banner, and on Halloween a jack-o'-lantern can be seen in the sand. The screensaver can be manipulated into showing these features by adjusting the computer clock to correspond with the date of the event.

== Availability ==
The Johnny Castaway screensaver was distributed on a 3½-inch floppy disk and required a computer with a 386SX processor and Windows 3.1 as its operating system. Today, it is widely available on the internet, but as it relies on outdated 16-bit software components, it will only work on older versions of the Microsoft Windows operating system, although workarounds exist for getting the screensaver to run on Windows 64-bit, Mac OS X and Linux.

== Development ==
Character design was done by Shawn Bird while he was at Dynamix. The program was developed at Jeff Tunnell Productions, the eponymous company of the original founder of Dynamix. According to Ken Williams, the screensaver was one of several products by Dynamix that were not costly to create and yet very profitable, like The Incredible Machine and Hoyle Card Games, also published by Sierra.

== Reception ==
Computer Gaming World called Johnny Castaway "a great launch" for the Screen Antics series, concluding that "Fans of Johnny Hart-style comics and sight gag lovers everywhere should love it".
