= Image persistence =

Temporary effect on LCD and plasma screens

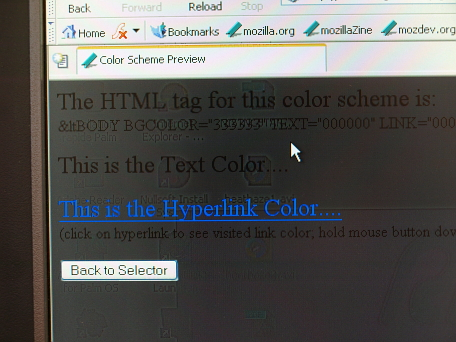
Detail of a TFT display showing whole screen persistence artifacts

TFT display showing persistence artifacts

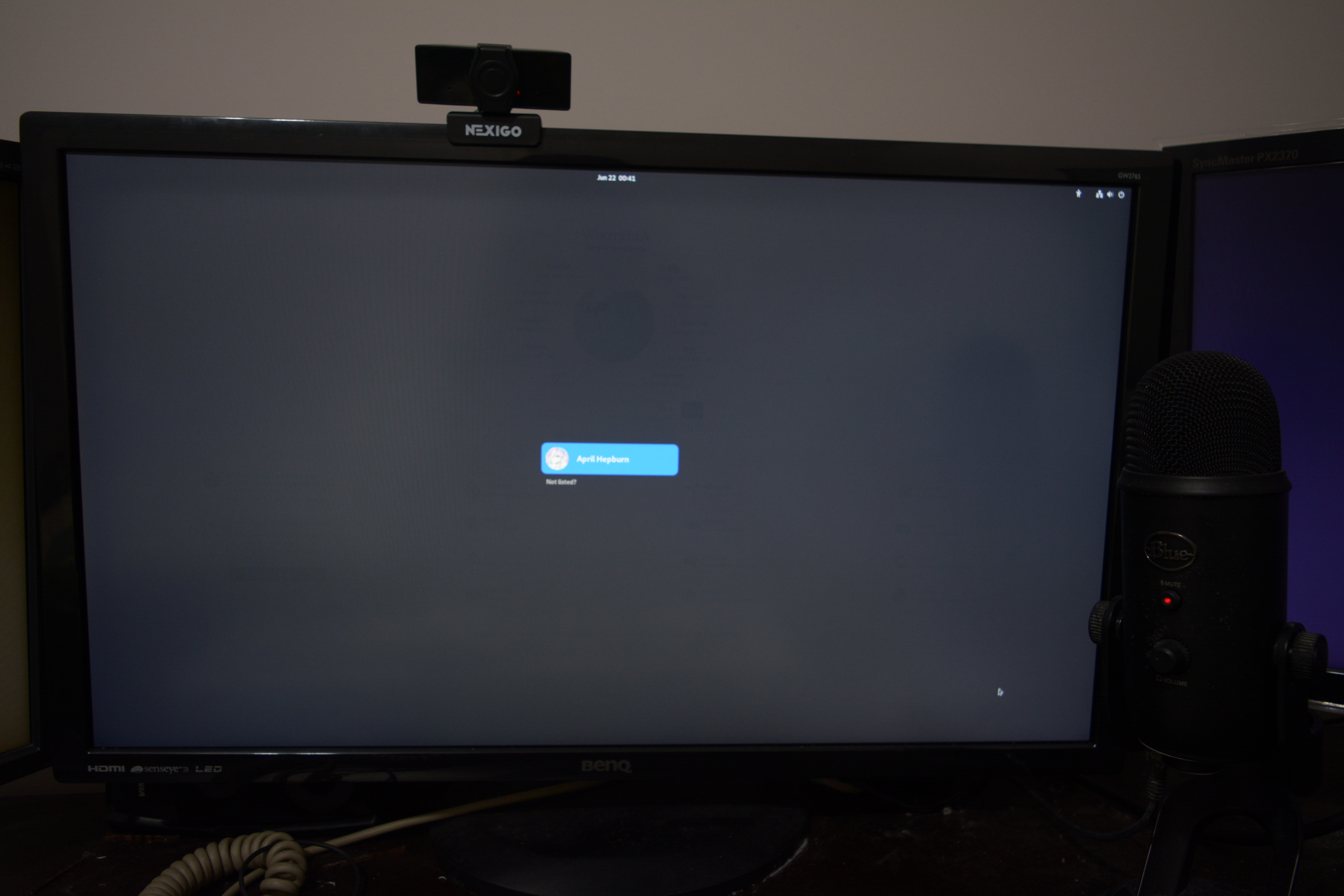
Image persistence on a BenQ GW2765HT IPS LCD monitor

Image persistence, or image retention, is a phenomenon in LCD and plasma displays where unwanted visual information is shown which corresponds to a previous state of the display. It is the flat-panel equivalent of screen burn-in. Unlike screen burn-in, the effects are usually temporary and often not visible without close inspection. Plasma displays experiencing severe image persistence can result in screen burn-in instead.

Image persistence can occur as easily as having something remain unchanged on the screen in the same location for a duration of even 10 minutes, such as a web page or document. Minor cases of image persistence are generally only visible when looking at darker areas on the screen, and usually invisible to the eye during ordinary computer use. If an image updates every millisecond, it can take two minutes for a defective LCD screen, or 10 minutes for a normal LCD screen, instead of 6 minutes for a defective one or 4 hours for a working one.

== Cause ==
Liquid crystals have a natural relaxed state. When a voltage is applied they rearrange themselves to block certain light waves. If left with the same voltage for an extended period of time (e.g. displaying a pointer or a taskbar in one place, or showing a picture for an extended period of time), the liquid crystals can develop a tendency to stay in one position. This ever-so-slight tendency to stay arranged in one position can throw the requested color off by a slight degree, which causes the image to look like the traditional "burn-in" on phosphor-based displays.

The cause of LCD image retention is different from phosphor aging as in CRTs, but the visual phenomenon is the same: uneven use of display pixels. Slight LCD image retention can be recovered. When severe image retention occurs, the liquid crystal molecules have been polarized and cannot rotate in the electric field, so they cannot be recovered.

Severe image retention on an LCD manifests as a ghostly, persistent afterimage—akin to a translucent, three-dimensional shadow—of content that remained static on the screen for an extended period. This ghosting is caused by the temporary polarization or "sticking" of the liquid crystal molecules within specific pixels. When a static image (like a taskbar, logo, or document outline) is displayed, the voltage applied to those pixels holds the liquid crystals in a fixed orientation for too long.

The cause of this tendency is unclear. It might be due to various factors, including accumulation of ionic impurities inside the LCD, impurities introduced during the fabrication of the LCD, imperfect driver settings, electric charge building up near the electrodes, parasitic capacitance, or a DC voltage component that occurs unavoidably in some display pixels owing to anisotropy in the dielectric constant of the liquid crystal.

== Prevention and treatment ==
Image persistence can be reversed by allowing the liquid crystals to relax and return to their relaxed state, such as by turning off the monitor for a sufficiently long period of time (at least a few hours). For most minor cases, simply continuing to use the computer as usual (and thus allowing other colors to "cover" the affected regions) or turning off the monitor for the night is more than enough. One strategy for users looking to avoid image persistence artifacts is to vary the activities performed on a computer to avoid static colors and hide elements on the screen which are displayed perpetually (such as an OS's taskbar). Another strategy is the usage of a screensaver to help during times the computer is left unattended. Covering the entire display area with pure white for an extended period of time is also a useful proactive solution.

Several monitor manufacturers (notably Dell) includes a built in setting which cycle through multiple colors. Dell encourages to leave this setting on for several hours if there are signs of image persistence. Some LCD displays may also cycle through colors while the display is on sleep mode (the backlight is off) with the idea that the visibility of image persistence is reduced when the display is in use later on.
