= XScreenSaver =

Screensaver software

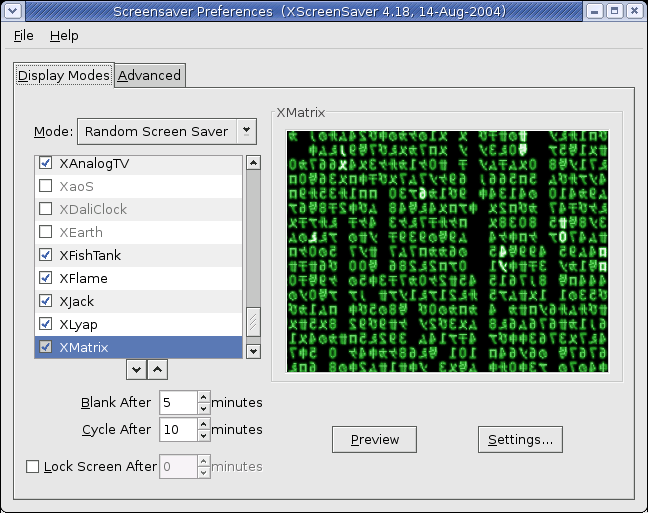
- XScreenSaver-demo and the XMatrix hack
- Original author: Jamie Zawinski
- Developer: Jamie Zawinski
- Release: 17 August 1992; 34 years ago
- Stable release: 6.17 / October 10, 2026; 32 days ago
- Written in: ANSI C, X11, OpenGL
- Operating system: Unix, macOS, iOS, Android
- Type: Screensaver
- License: MIT License
- Website: www.jwz.org/xscreensaver/

Xscreensaver "GLMatrix" screensaver

XScreenSaver is a free and open-source collection of 240+ screensavers for Unix, macOS, iOS and Android operating systems. It was created by Jamie Zawinski in 1992, with new releases coming out several times a year.
