= Screen burn-in =

Disfigurement of an electronic display

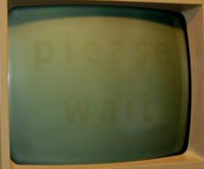
Burn-in on a monitor, when severe as in this "please wait" message, is visible even when the monitor is switched off.

Screen burn-in, image burn-in, ghost image, or shadow image, is a permanent discoloration of areas on an electronic visual display such as a cathode-ray tube (CRT) or organic light-emitting diode (OLED) in a computer monitor or television set. It is caused by cumulative non-uniform use of the screen.

Although not immune to permanent burn-in, liquid-crystal displays (LCDs) may instead suffer from a phenomenon called image persistence, which is not permanent.

One way to combat screen burn-in was the use of screensavers, which would move an image around to ensure that no one area of the screen remained illuminated for too long.

== Causes ==
With phosphor-based electronic visual displays (i.e. CRT-type computer monitors, oscilloscope screens, and plasma displays), non-uniform use of specific areas, such as prolonged display of non-moving images (text or graphics), repetitive contents in gaming graphics, or certain broadcasts with tickers and flags, can create a permanent ghost-like image of these objects or otherwise degrade image quality. This is because the phosphor compounds that emit light to produce images lose their luminance with use. This wear results in uneven light output over time, and in severe cases can create a ghost image of previous content. Even if ghost images are not recognizable, the effects of screen burn are an immediate and continual degradation of image quality.

The length of time required for noticeable screen burn to develop varies due to many factors, ranging from the quality of the phosphors employed to the degree of non-uniformity of subpixel use. It can take as little as a few weeks for noticeable ghosting to set in, especially if the screen displays a certain image constantly and displays it continually over time, such as a menu bar at the top or bottom of the screen. In the rare case when horizontal or vertical deflection circuits fail, all output energy is concentrated to a vertical or horizontal line on the display, which causes almost instant screen burn.

== CRT ==
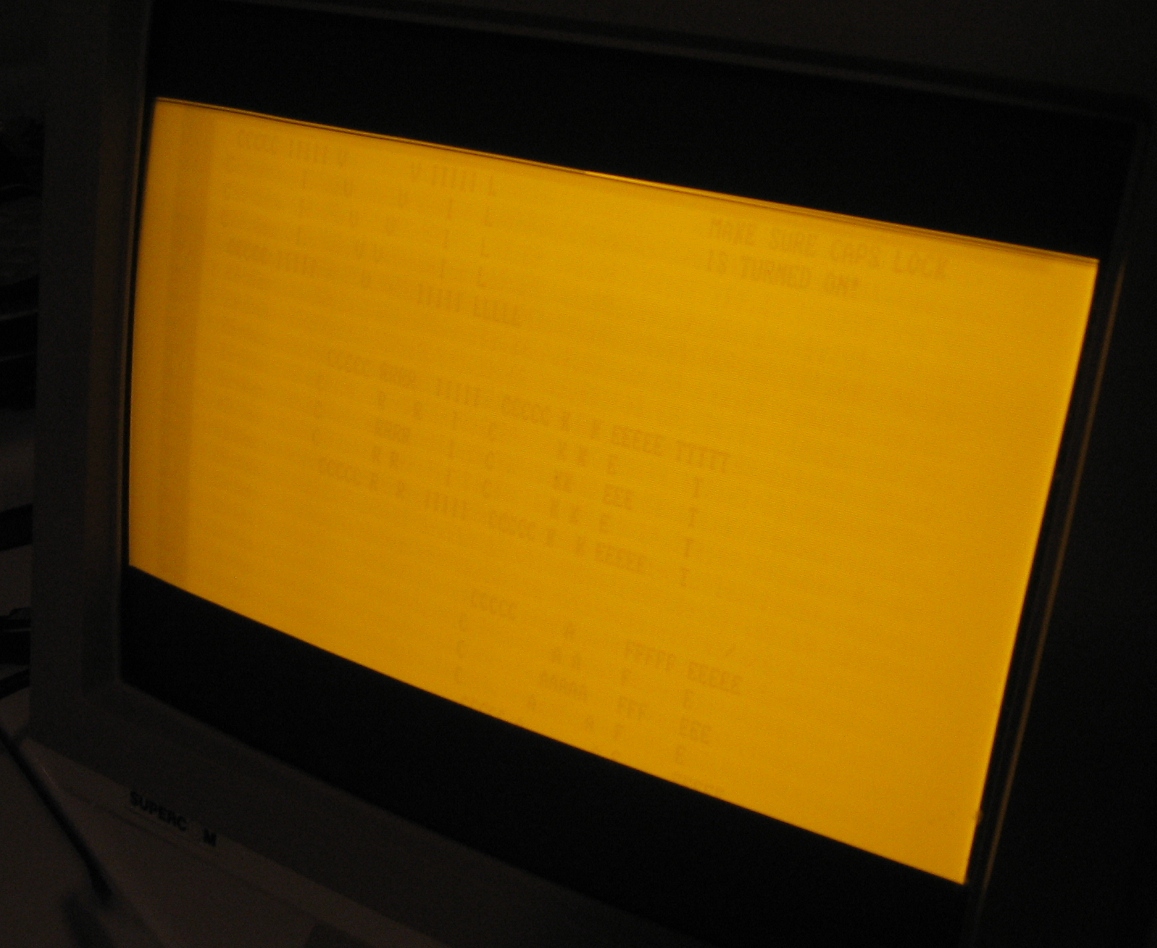
Screen burn on an amber CRT computer monitor. There are two separate burned-in images: one of a spreadsheet program, and another of an ASCII-art welcome screen.

Phosphor burn-in is particularly prevalent with monochromatic CRT screens, such as the amber or green monochrome monitors common on older computer systems and dumb terminal stations. This is partly because those screens displayed mostly non-moving images, and at one intensity: fully on. Yellow screens are more susceptible than either green or white screens because the yellow phosphor is less efficient and thus requires a higher beam current. Color screens, by contrast, use three separate phosphors (red, green, and blue), mixed in varying intensities to achieve specific colors, and in typical usage patterns such as "traditional" TV viewing (non-gaming, non-converged TV usage, non-Internet browsing, broadcasts without tickers or flags, no prolonged or permanent letterboxing) are used for operations where colors and on-screen object placement approach uniformity.

Modern CRT displays are less susceptible than older CRTs prior to the 1960s because they have a layer of aluminum behind the phosphor, which offers some protection. The aluminum layer was provided to reflect more light from the phosphor toward the viewer. As a bonus, the aluminum layer also prevented ion burn of the phosphor and the ion trap, common to older monochrome televisions, was no longer required.

== Plasma, LCD, and OLED displays ==
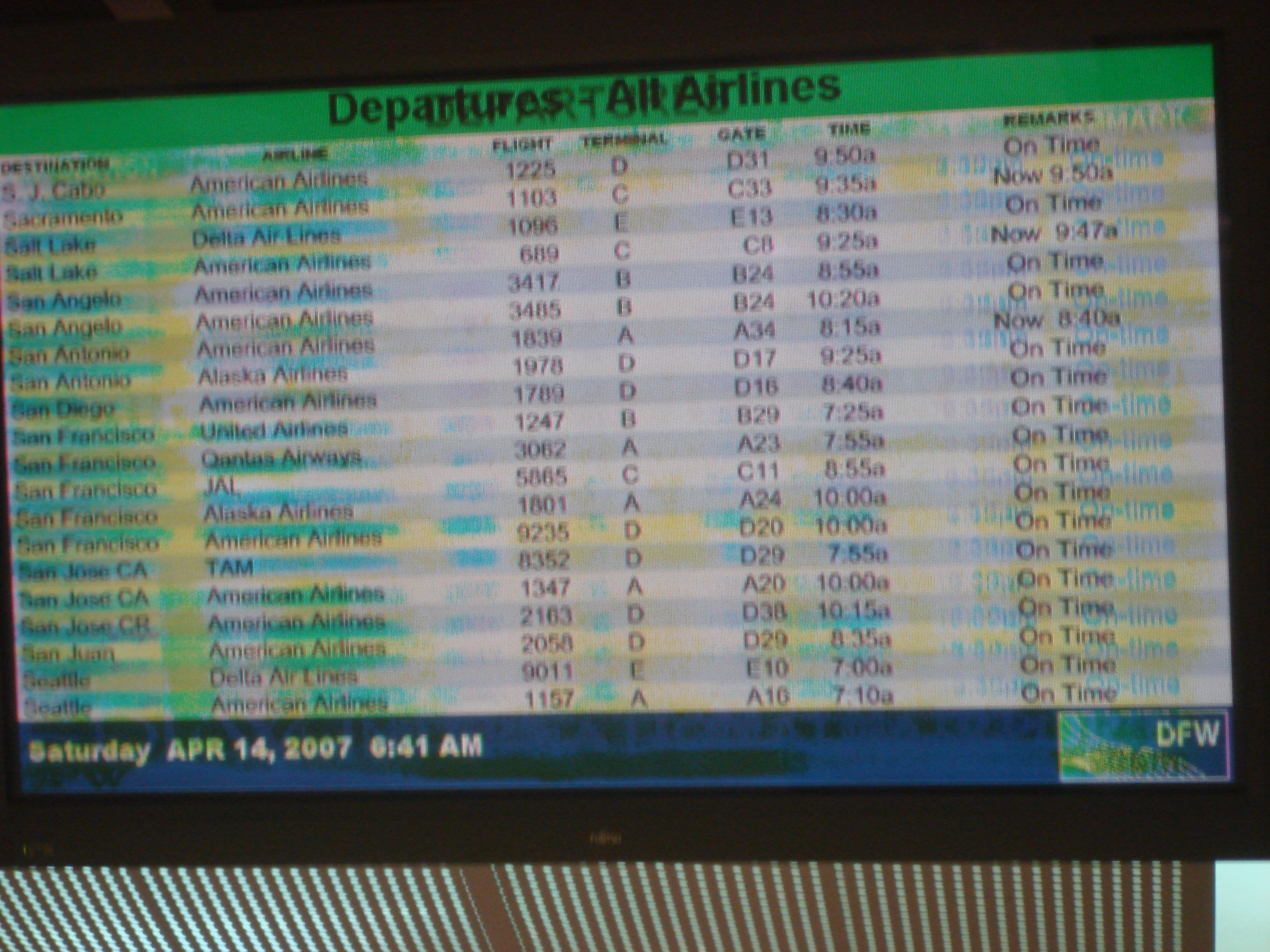
Burn-in on a plasma screen at Dallas Fort Worth International Airport (2007)

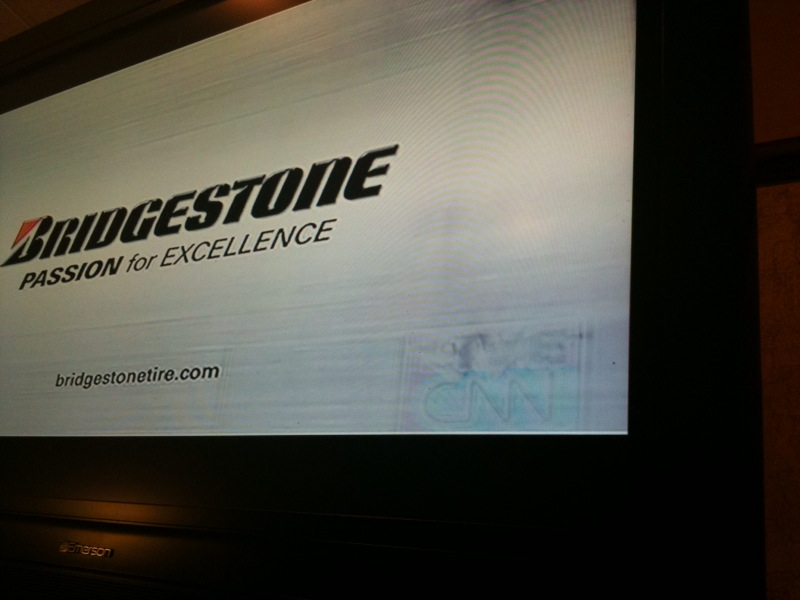
A nearly two-year-old LCD television showing extreme burn-in of CNN's logo circa 2008 digital on-screen graphic; this television is in a McDonald's restaurant where CNN is permanently turned on and displayed throughout the business day.

Plasma displays produced until around 2007 were highly susceptible to burn-in, while LCD-type displays are rarely affected. The wide variation in luminance degradation with RGB-based organic light-emitting diode (OLED) will cause noticeable color drift over time (where one of the red-green-blue colors becomes more prominent). OLEDs do not need a backlight to light up; each pixel is a self-illuminating LED. The pixels on OLEDs inevitably lose their brightness over time. The longer an OLED pixel is used (illuminated), the dimmer it will appear next to a lesser-used pixel.

In the case of LCDs, the physics of burn-in are different than plasma and OLED, which develop burn-in from luminance degradation of the light-emitting pixels. For LCDs, burn-in develops in some cases because pixels permanently lose their ability to return to their relaxed state after a continued static use profile. In most typical usage profiles, this image persistence in LCD is only transient.

Both plasma-type and LCD-type displays exhibit a similar phenomenon called transient image persistence, which is similar to screen burn but is not permanent. In the case of plasma-type displays, transient image persistence is caused by charge build-up in the pixel cells (not cumulative luminance degradation as with burn-in), which can be seen sometimes when a bright image that was set against a dark background is replaced by a dark background only; this image retention is usually released once a typical-brightness image is displayed and does not inhibit the display's typical viewing image quality.

== Mitigation ==
Screensavers derive their name from its original purpose, which was an active method of attempting to stave off screen burn. By ensuring that no pixel or group of pixels was left displaying a static image for extended periods of time, phosphor luminosity was preserved. Modern screensavers can turn off the screen when not in use. Some screensavers move around, such as those on DVD players or those on some television sets that move around paused video after a long period of inactivity.

In many cases, the use of a screensaver is impractical. Most plasma-type display manufacturers include methods for reducing the rate of burn-in by moving the image slightly, which does not eliminate screen burn but can soften the edges of any ghost image that does develop. Similar techniques exist for modern OLED displays. For example, manufacturers of Android Wear watches with OLED displays can request that Android Wear enable "burn protection techniques" that periodically shifts the contents of the screen by a few pixels. Google requests that when these techniques are enabled, watch face developers do not use large blocks of pixels so that different pixels are burned in with each shift, reducing the overall wear of the pixels.

Apple's iPhone X and Samsung's Galaxy series both mitigate or delay the onset of burn-in by shifting the pixels every minute or so for the battery, Wi-Fi, location, and service bars.

LG's OLED televisions include several burn-in mitigation features, accessed through menus the company brands as OLED Care and OLED Panel Care. These include a Pixel Refresher (also called Pixel Cleaning) that runs automatically after about four cumulative hours of use, a Screen Move function that shifts the image slightly, and an Adjust Logo Brightness setting that dims static on-screen elements. Some manufacturers have also introduced limited panel warranties on premium OLED models; LG began offering a five-year limited panel warranty on its flagship sets in 2021, covering defects in materials or workmanship, though whether coverage extends to permanent image retention was not stated explicitly.

Depending on the type of screen, it is sometimes possible to remedy screen burn-in through the use of remedial software and remedial devices. In the case of OLED screens on Android phones, burn-in reduction apps can display an inverted image of the navigation and status bars (which are constantly displayed and therefore the most likely elements to be burned in) to burn in an opposite pattern, resulting in a screen whose subpixels have more even luminosity and therefore less visible burn-in artifacts.

== Historical notes ==
The most prevalent burn-in image on early televisions was said to be that of the RCA Indian-head test pattern, which would often follow the formal television station sign-off. This was due to the viewer leaving the television set on at the end of the day, which was not recommended by television manufacturers.
