= Screensaver =

Software controlling a monitor

Einstein@Home interactive screensaver

A screensaver (or screen saver) is software that controls a monitor of the host computer with the intent of preventing screen burn-in for a screen susceptible to it. Generally, a screensaver starts controlling a monitor when the computer has been idle for a designated period of time and fills the screen either with black (all pixels off) or with changing graphics that tend to prevent each pixel from being on for a long time. Although monitors were commonly constructed with screen technology that was susceptible to burn-in (CRT and plasma), most modern monitors use LCD, which is not. Another modern technology, OLED, is susceptible.

In addition to the feature described by its name (saving a screen from burn-in), a screensaver may provide other features. It may provide physical security by requiring a password to exit the screen control mode (acting as a lock screen). Some use otherwise-idle computer resources to do useful work, such as processing for volunteer computing projects.

Many modern devices such as televisions and other digital entertainment devices include a screensaver.

== Considerations ==
A monitor controlled by a screensaver consumes the same amount of power as when the screensaver is not controlling it, which can be anywhere from a few watts for small LCD monitors to several hundred for large plasma displays. Most modern computers can be set to switch the monitor into a lower power mode, blanking the screen altogether. A power-saving mode for monitors is usually part of the power management options supported in modern operating systems, though it must also be supported by the computer hardware and monitor itself.

Using a screensaver with a flat panel or TFT LCD screen instead of powering down the screen can actually decrease the lifetime of the display, since the fluorescent backlight remains lit and ages faster than it would if the screen is turned off and on frequently. As fluorescent tubes age, they grow progressively dimmer, and they can be expensive or difficult to replace. A typical LCD screen loses about 50% of its brightness during a normal product lifetime. In most cases, the tube is an integral part of the LCD and the entire assembly needs to be replaced. This is not true of LED backlit displays.

Thus, the term "screen saver" is now something of a misnomer – the best way to save the screen and also save electricity consumed by screen would simply be to have the computer turn off the monitor. Screensavers displaying complex 3D graphics might even add to overall power draw.

== Purpose ==
=== Screen protection ===
Before the advent of LCD screens, most computer screens were based on cathode-ray tube (CRT) technology. When an image is displayed on a CRT screen for a long period, the properties of the exposed areas of the phosphor coating on the inside of the screen gradually and permanently change, eventually leading to a darkened shadow or "ghost" image on the screen, called screen burn-in. Televisions, oscilloscopes and other devices that use a CRT are susceptible to phosphor burn-in, as are plasma displays to some extent. Screensavers were originally designed to help avoid these effects by automatically changing the images on the screen during periods of user inactivity.

For CRTs used in public, such as an automated teller machine (ATM) and railway ticketing machine, the risk of burn-in is especially high because a stand-by display is shown whenever the machine is not in use. Older machines designed without burn-in problems taken into consideration often display evidence of screen damage, with images or text such as "Please insert your card" (in the case of ATMs) visible even when the display changes while the machine is in use. Blanking the screen is not a valid option as the machine can be perceived as out of service. In these applications, burn-in can be prevented by shifting the position of the display contents every few seconds, or by having a number of different images that are changed regularly.

Later CRTs were much less susceptible to burn-in due to improvements in phosphor coatings, and because modern computer images are generally lower contrast than the stark green-on-black or white-on-black text and graphics of earlier systems. LCD computer monitors, including the display panels used in laptop computers, are not susceptible to burn-in because the image is not directly produced by phosphors although they can suffer from a less extreme and usually non-permanent form of image persistence.

While modern screens are not susceptible to burn-in, screensavers are still used for other purposes. They usually feature moving graphics and sometimes sound.

=== Physical security ===
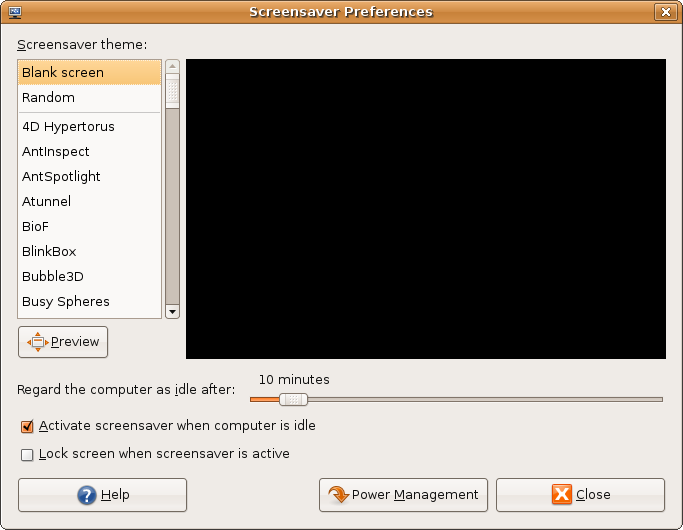
GNOME Screensaver has an option for password protection.

As a screensaver usually activates when the user is away, some screensavers ask users for a password before relinquishing control of the screen for normal computer use. This is a basic security measure against another person accessing the machine while the user is away.

=== Background work ===
Some screensavers activate a background task, such as a virus scan or a volunteer computing application (such as the SETI@home project).

=== Entertainment ===
At least one screensaver, Johnny Castaway, told a humorous animated story over many months.

== History ==
The first screensaver for computers was written for the original IBM PC by John Socha, best known for creating Norton Commander; he also coined the term screen saver. The screensaver, named scrnsave, was published in the December 1983 issue of the Softalk magazine. It simply blanked the screen after three minutes of inactivity.

By 1983 a Zenith Data Systems executive included "screen-saver" among the new Z-29 computer terminal's features, telling InfoWorld that it "blanks out the display after 15 minutes of nonactivity, preventing burned-in character displays." The first screensaver that allowed users to change the activating time was released on Apple's Lisa, in 1983.

The Atari 400 and 800's screens would also go through random screensaver-like color changes if they were left inactive for about 8 minutes. Normal users had no control over this, though programs did. These computers, released in 1979, are technically earlier "screen savers". Prior to these computers, games for the 1977 Atari VCS/2600 gaming console such as Combat and Breakout, included color cycling in order to prevent burn-in of game images into 1970s-era televisions. In addition, the first model of the TI-30 calculator from 1976 featured a screensaver, which consisted of a decimal point running across the display after 30 seconds of inactivity. This was chiefly used to save battery power, as the TI-30 LED display was more power intensive than later LCD models. These are examples of screensavers in ROM or the firmware of a computer.

Android 4.2 introduced "daydreams", screensavers that activate while the device is docked or charging.

In 2015 the screensaver "Event Listeners" of van den Dorpel became the first work of art that was purchased by a museum (Museum of Applied Arts, Vienna) using the cryptocurrency bitcoin.

Modern graphics technologies such as 3D computer graphics have allowed a wide variety of screensavers to be made. Screensavers with realistic 3D environments can be programmed and run on modern computers.

== See also ==
- Degaussing
- DVD screensaver
