= Hands Off protests =

2025 protests against Donald Trump

- Part of the protests against the second presidency of Donald Trump and the 50501 protests
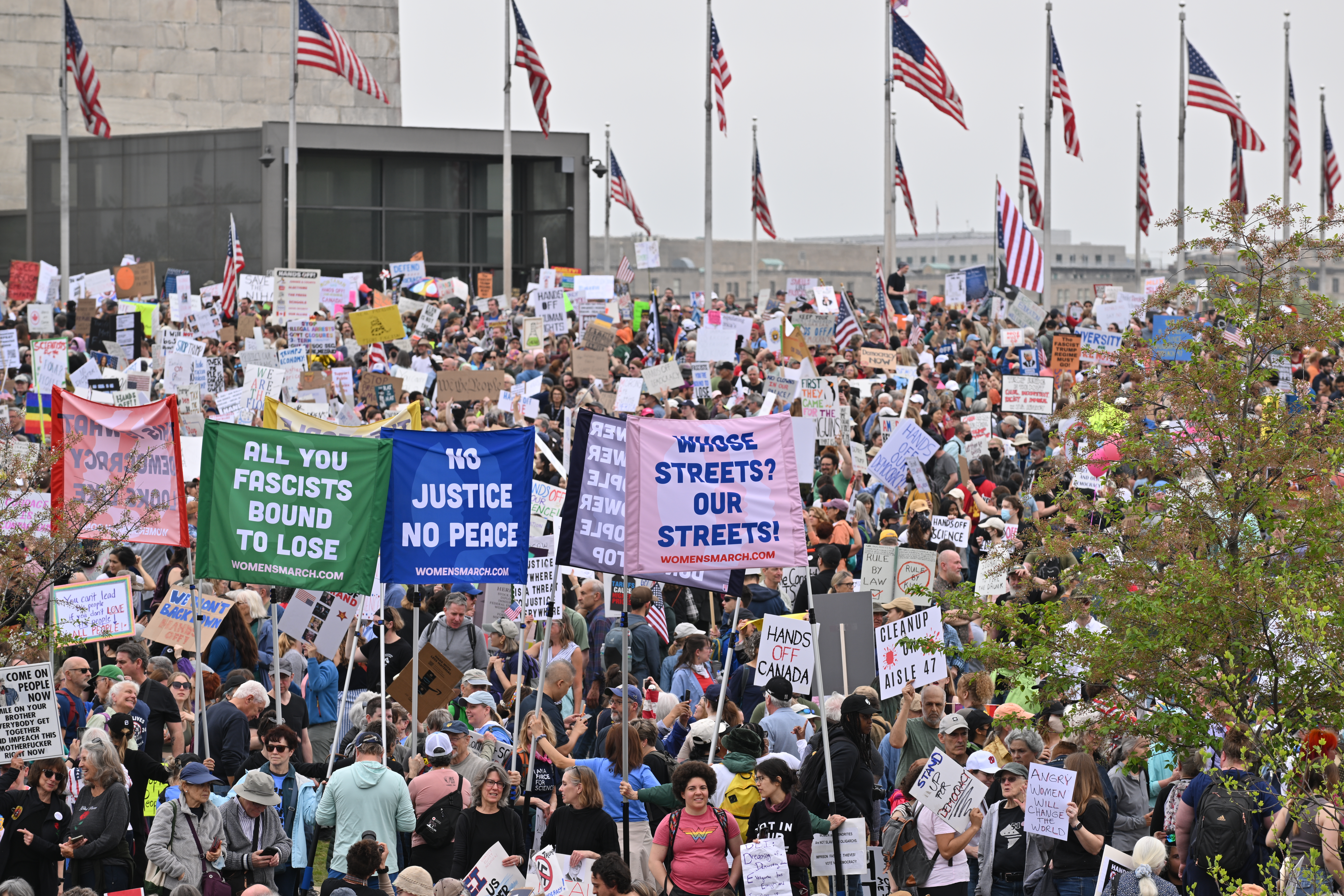
- Protesters at the National Mall, Washington, D.C.
- Date: April 5, 2025
- Location: United States; international
- Caused by: Opposition to Donald Trump and Elon Musk
- Goals: Varied: Impeachment and removal of Donald Trump from office; Removal of Elon Musk from office; Upholding the Constitution of the United States; Ending funding cuts to Medicare, Social Security, and other federal programs; Lifting tariffs placed by the Trump administration; Protection of immigrants, transgender people, and other minorities; Restoration of diplomatic relations with Canada and Europe
- Methods: Demonstrations; mass protests
- Status: Ended

Parties
Over 150 grassroots organizations
Major organizers
- 50501 movement
- Indivisible movement
- Women's March
Over 150 nationwide organizers and partners
- Human Rights Campaign
- End Citizens United
- AFL-CIO
- Communications Workers of America
- Autistic Self Advocacy Network
- Democratic Socialists of America
- Faithful America
- Catholics Vote Common Good
- Planned Parenthood
- National Women's Political Caucus
- League of Women Voters
- Stand Up America
- Third Act Movement

Lead figures
| Organization leaders and figures: u/Evolved_Fungi; Ezra Levin; Tamika Middleton; Kelley Robinson; Tiffany Muller; Claude Cummings Jr. | Political opposition support: Bernie Sanders; Alexandria Ocasio-Cortez; Ilhan Omar; Eric Swalwell; Jamie Raskin |

Logo

The Hands Off protests were a series of demonstrations launched across the United States on April 5, 2025, in the largest one-day, nationwide display of public resistance against the second administration of President Donald Trump until the No Kings protests two months later. The Hands Off demonstration was described as the "biggest day of protest." Organized under the "Hands Off!" banner, demonstrations voicing opposition to the administration's policies occurred in over 1,400 locations across all 50 U.S. states, drawing up to an estimated three to five million participants nationwide according to the demonstration organizers. According to demonstration coordinators, the protests involved a coalition of over 150 progressive, labor union, pro-democracy, civil rights, LGBTQ+, and women's rights groups.

The rallies protested a wide range of administration policies, including newly imposed global tariffs causing economic turmoil, significant cuts to government agencies and the federal workforce spearheaded by Elon Musk, imperiled union rights, immigration raids perceived as disorganized and politically motivated, rollbacks on LGBTQ+ rights, potentially harmful changes to Social Security, and cuts to healthcare funding and research. Protesters voiced broader concerns about democratic backsliding, growing authoritarianism, and the administration's perceived orientation towards the interests of billionaires over American workers, with protestors framing their actions as a defense of American democracy and economic well-being.

== Overview ==
The Hands Off protests were led by a nationwide coalition of organizations, including civil rights organizations, veterans, women's rights groups, labor unions, and LGBTQ+ advocates, for example Indivisible. The protests were in response to what the organizers saw as the administration's overreach on many issues: NATO; schools; libraries; courts; veteran services; fair elections; transgender rights; Social Security; Medicare; Medicaid; the federal workforce; abortion rights; and many others. In a document, organizers said that they had three demands: "an end to the billionaire takeover and rampant corruption of the Trump administration; an end to slashing federal funds for Medicaid, Social Security, and other programs working people rely on; and an end to the attacks on immigrants, trans people, and other communities."

While the Hands Off protests were not the first demonstrations against Trump's second presidency, they were described as the first mass mobilization comparable to the 2017 Women's March and the 2020 George Floyd protests. In contrast to protests during Trump's first term, which focused on Washington, D.C., organizers of the Hands Off protests tried to spread them throughout the US. Protests took place in many locations, including state capitols, federal buildings, congressional offices, Social Security headquarters, parks and city halls. According to organizers, many of the smaller local rallies were formed organically by neighbors and friends.

Organizers estimated that around 100,000 people attended the D.C. rally, ten times more than they had expected. Speakers at the rally included several Democratic members of Congress and the president of the American Federation of Government Employees, Everett Kelley, among others. Organizers estimated the total number of protesters as "millions." According to coordinators, the protests involved a coalition of over 150 progressive, labor union, pro-democracy, civil rights, LGBTQ+, and women's rights groups.

== Participants ==
Some notable groups listed as "Partners" on the Hands Off! official website include 50501, the American Civil Liberties Union, Indivisible, and the Democratic Socialists of America.

Others (listed by the organizational focus) include:

- Conservation: Greenpeace, the League of Conservation Voters, the Green New Deal Network, 350.org, and 198 methods.
- Women's rights: Planned Parenthood, and the National Women's Political Caucus.
- Unions and workers' rights: AFL-CIO, AFSCME 3299, the National Treasury Employees Union, the United Auto Workers, and several other national union organizations.
- Civil rights: Autistic Self Advocacy Network, the Arab American Institute, and the Disability Culture Lab.
- LGBTQ+ rights: Christopher Street Project, Bulletproof Pride, Pride At Work, and the Center for LGBTQ Economic Advancement and Research.
- Economic issues: Americans for Tax Fairness, the Strong Economy for All Coalition, and the Consumer Federation of America.
- Religious activism: Interfaith Alliance, Unitarian Universalists for Social Justice, and the New York Jewish Agenda.

A number of local and regional action groups also participated, as well as national groups focused on various issues, including civil rights and elections.

== Locations and activities ==
In Europe, protests organized by Democrats Abroad are being held in Berlin, Frankfurt, Lisbon, Paris and London. In Ottawa, protesters gathered outside the U.S. embassy. Lisbon, Portugal also held a protest.

=== Midwestern U.S. ===
==== East North Central states ====
In Illinois, protests took place in Chicago, Bloomington, Champaign, Oak Park, Peoria, Rockford, Crystal Lake, Evanston, Elgin, Arlington Heights, DeKalb, Palatine, Joliet, Lisle, Highland Park, Geneva, Gurnee, Ottawa, McHenry, Wheaton, and Springfield. Several hundred people marched in front of Ogle County Courthouse in the city of Oregon, and over 500 gathered in Sterling. Al Jazeera reported that the protesters in Chicago are concerned about their jobs.

Protests were held outside the Indiana Statehouse in Indianapolis. Protests were also held in Bloomington, Fort Wayne, Goshen, and South Bend. In Lafayette, a man in a Trump shirt exited his vehicle as protesters crossed a road. The man scuffled with a protester, being head-butted in the process, before returning to his vehicle and grabbing a rifle. Police detained the man but released him, saying he did not point the gun at anybody.

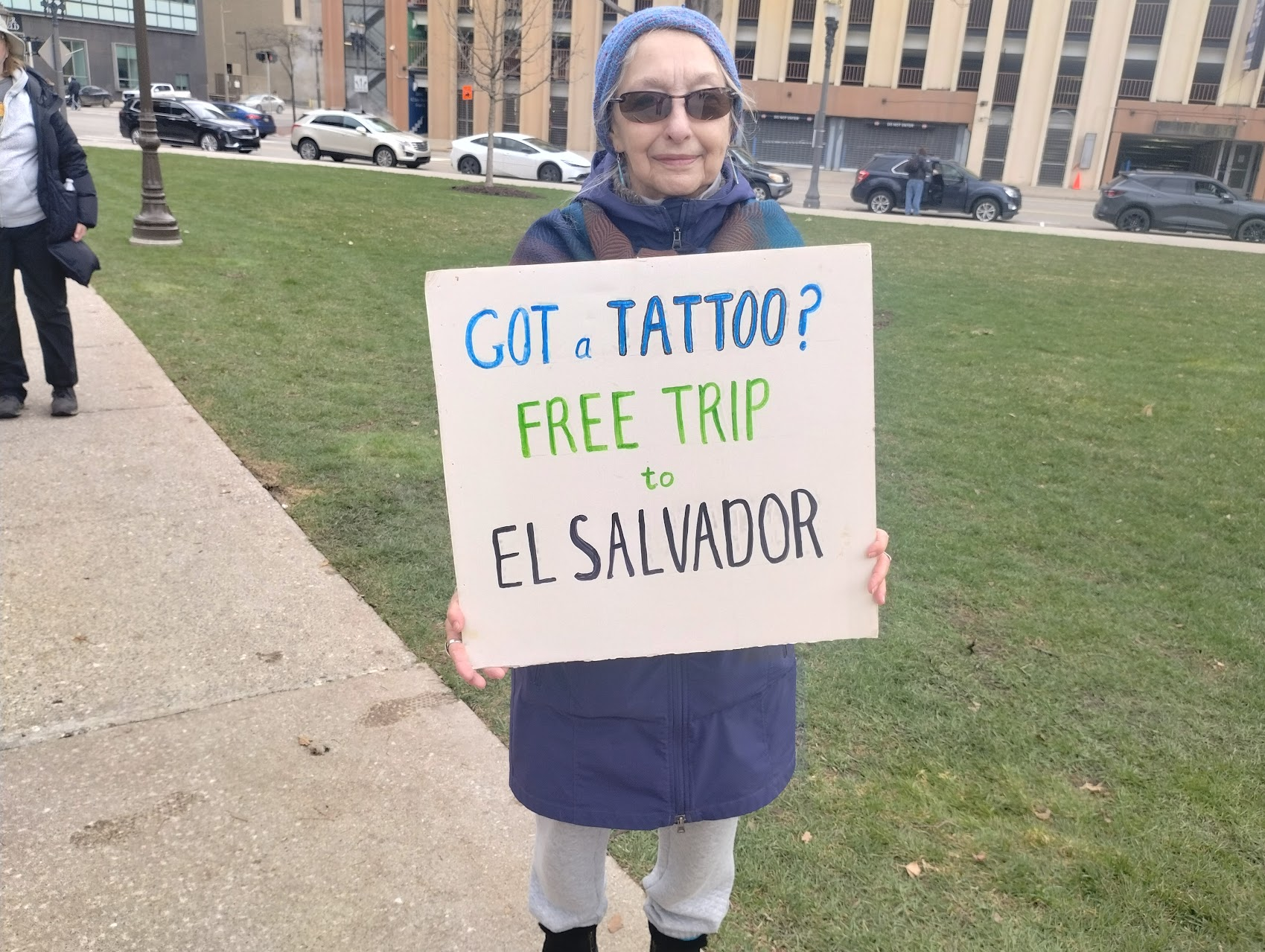
A woman protesting the deportation of people to El Salvador because of tattoos in Lansing Michigan on April 5th

The Detroit Free Press reported there were 55 demonstrations in Michigan, including in Detroit, Lansing, Novi, Troy, and Ferndale. Additional protests were held in Boyne City, Grand Rapids, Marquette, Traverse City, Paw Paw, Petoskey, Portage, St. Joseph, and Wyandotte.

Thousands of protesters gathered outside the Ohio Statehouse in Columbus. Protests were also held in Akron, Chagrin Falls, Cincinnati, Cleveland, Cuyahoga Falls, Dayton, Fremont, Jackson Township, Kent, Mansfield,Marietta,Middletown, New Philadelphia, Ravenna, Springfield, Strongsville, Toledo, Troy, Wooster, and Xenia.

Approximately 30 protests were planned in Wisconsin, including the cities of Appleton, Green Bay, Kenosha, Madison, Milwaukee, and Oshkosh. More than 600 people protested in Rib Mountain.

==== West North Central states ====
In Iowa, more than a dozen protests were held, including in the capital of Des Moines where around 7,000 protestors rallied. Another protest in Iowa City had an estimated 1,000 protestors. Other locations include Cedar Rapids, Davenport, Mason City, Ames, Red Oak, Sioux City, Decorah, Council Bluffs, Dubuque, Fairfield, Lisbon, Maquoketa, Mount Vernon, and Waterloo.

Thousands of protesters assembled outside the Kansas Statehouse in Topeka. Protests were also held in Lawrence, Manhattan, and Wichita.

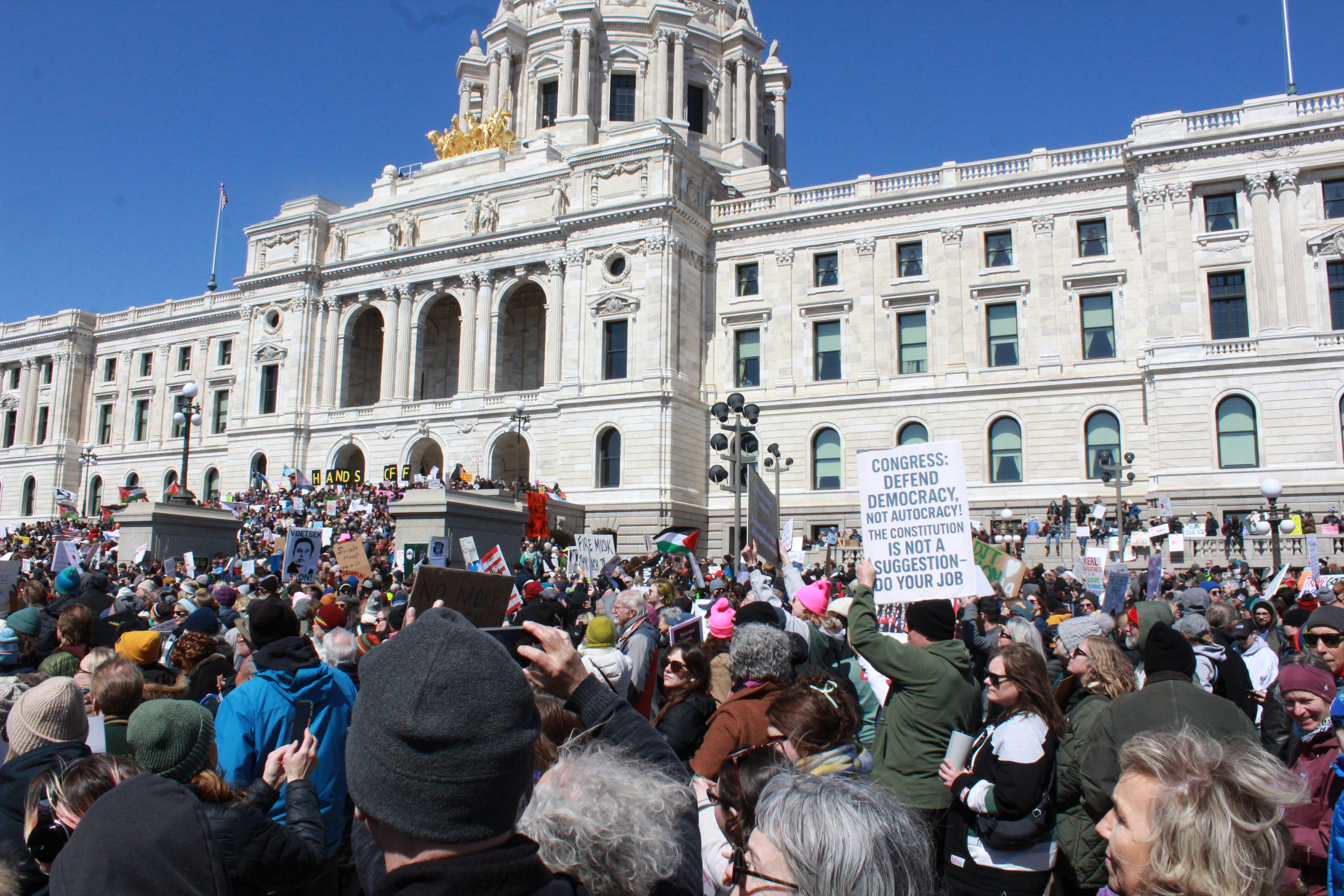
The protest at the Minnesota State Capitol

Twenty-five thousand people gathered in front of the Minnesota State Capitol in Saint Paul. Protests also occurred in Rochester, Alexandria, Detroit Lakes, Moorhead, Chisholm, Cloquet, Bemidji, Brainerd, Edina, Ely, Grand Marais, Grand Rapids, St. Cloud, Douglas County, Duluth, Northfield, Plymouth and St. Peter.

In Missouri, demonstrations and rallies were held in Ballwin, Brentwood, Columbia, Jefferson City, Joplin, Kansas City, St. Joseph, Springfield, and Union.

Hundreds of people protested outside the Nebraska State Capitol. Other protests were held in Hastings, Kearney, and Omaha.

In North Dakota, a protest was held on the bridge connecting Fargo with Moorhead, Minnesota. Another demonstration occurred outside the North Dakota Capitol in Bismarck. There were also protests in Grand Forks, Jamestown, and Minot.

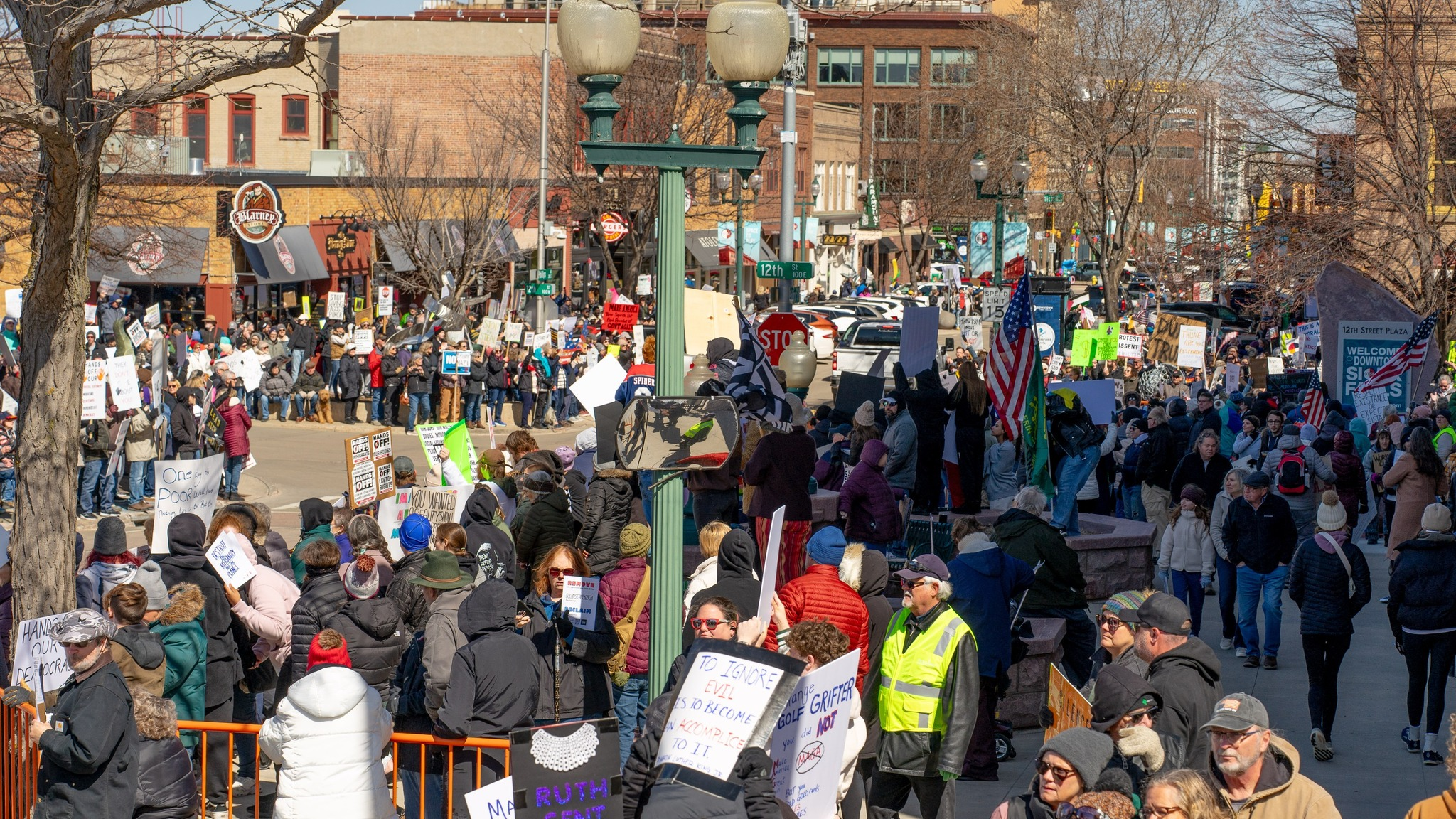
Protesters gather at downtown Sioux Falls.

In South Dakota, protests took place across the state including Sioux Falls, Rapid City, Pierre, Aberdeen, Watertown, Brookings, and Mitchell. Sioux Falls estimates show up to 5,000 in attendance while Rapid City's and Pierre's attendance range from 600 to 900 and 200-300 respectively. An estimated 320 people demonstrated in Brookings. In Crooks, one single resident protested near the highway.

=== Northeastern U.S. ===
==== Middle Atlantic states ====
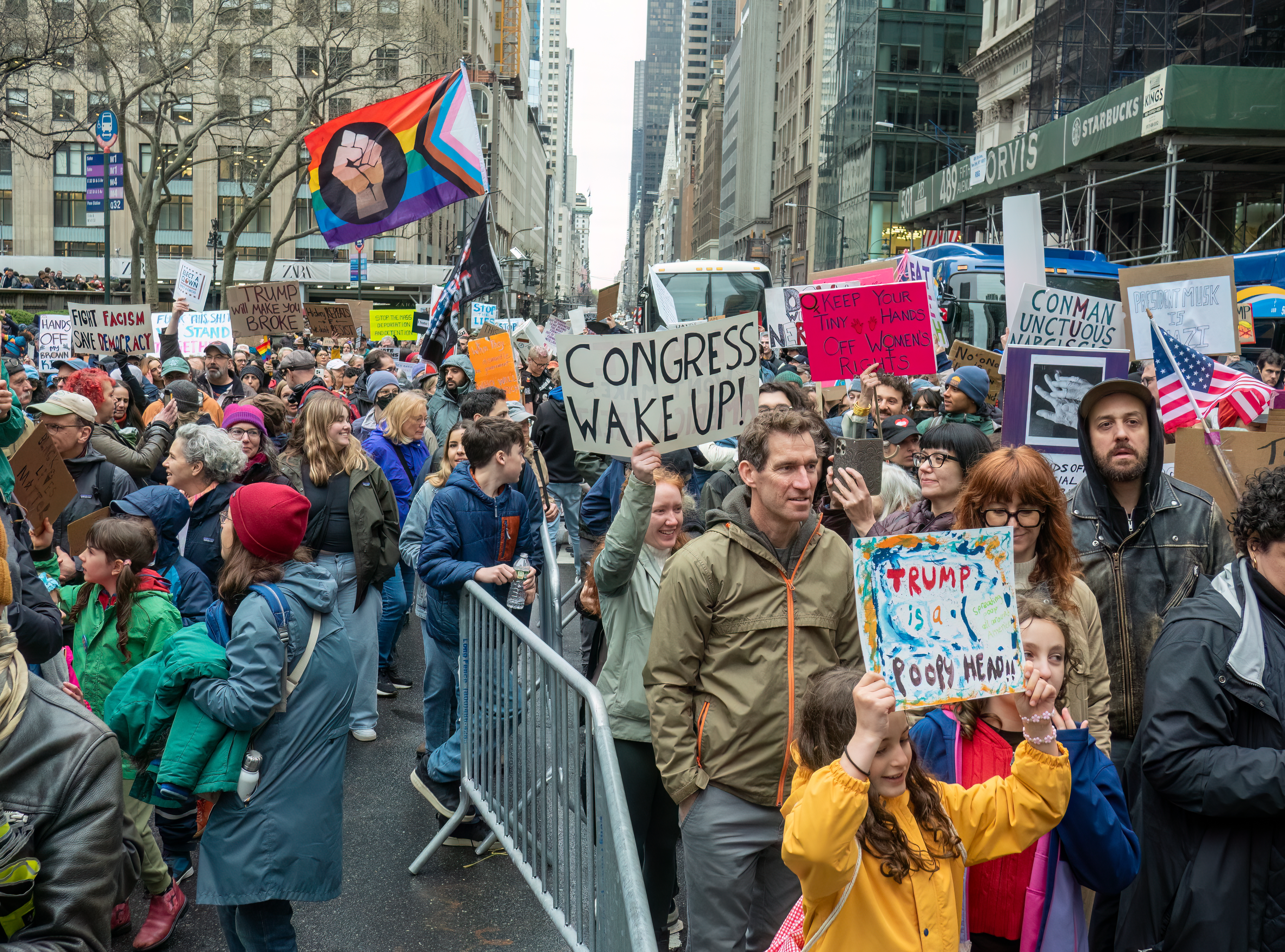
Protest in New York City

In New Jersey, Cory Booker spoke to a crowd of 8,000 in Brookdale Park. Protests also occurred in Atlantic City, Cape May Courthouse, Franklin Township, Galloway Township, Jersey City, Maplewood, Morristown, Pitman, Princeton, Red Bank, Teaneck, Toms River, and Trenton. Former state senator Loretta Weinberg, age 90, led a rally at a senior living facility in Teaneck.

Several protests were held in New York City, including in Bryant Park and Staten Island. Protests were also held in Rochester, Batavia, Buffalo, and Yonkers. In Sackets Harbor, demonstrators marched to the home of border czar Tom Homan in response to the detention of three children and their mother in late March.

In Pennsylvania, protests occurred in Altoona, Beaver, Butler, Erie, Harrisburg, Lancaster, Pittsburgh, Philadelphia, Reading, State College and York.

==== New England states ====
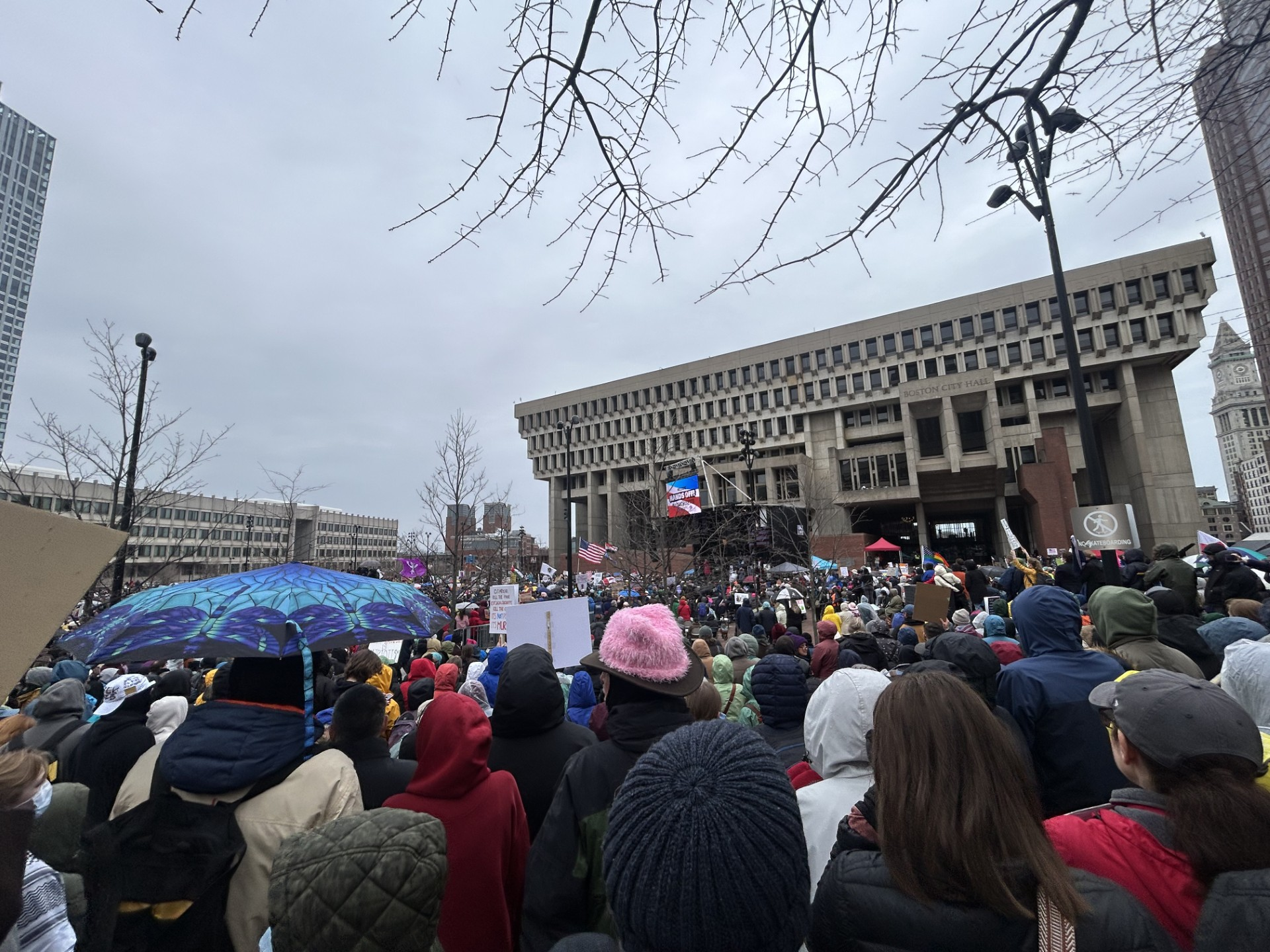
Protest in Boston, MA

In Connecticut, protests took place in Greenwich, Stamford, Middletown, New Haven, Hartford, and Waterbury.

In Maine, over 3,000 protesters gathered outside the Maine State House in Augusta. Protests were also held in Auburn, Freeport, Portland, South Paris, South Portland.

In Massachusetts, 25,000–30,000 protestors gathered in Boston Common and marched to Boston City Hall plaza. Speakers included Senator Ed Markey, Representative Ayanna Pressley, Boston mayor Michelle Wu, and the band Dropkick Murphys, who played a set including the protest song "Which Side Are You On?". As many as 100,000 protestors gathered throughout Boston. Protests also took place in Massachusetts towns including Attleboro, Bedford, Canton, Dartmouth, Falmouth, Framingham, Groton, Holliston, Hyannis, Lexington, Lowell, Natick, Newton, Northampton, Plymouth, Salem, Sharon, Walpole, Waltham, and Worcester.

In New Hampshire, protests were held across the state, including over 2,000 people in the state capital, Concord, and other towns including Colebrook, Conway, Dover, Enfield, Keene, Lebanon, Littleton, New London, Peterborough, Plaistow, Portsmouth, Nashua, and Wolfeboro.

In Rhode Island, 6,000–8,000 protesters gathered at Hope High School before marching through downtown Providence. Other protests were held in South Kingstown, Tiverton, Portsmouth and Westerly, as well as on Block Island.

Thousands of protesters gathered on the Vermont Statehouse Green in Montpelier. Protests were also held in Brattleboro, Rutland, Bennington, Burlington, and White River Junction.

=== Southern U.S. ===
==== East South Central states ====
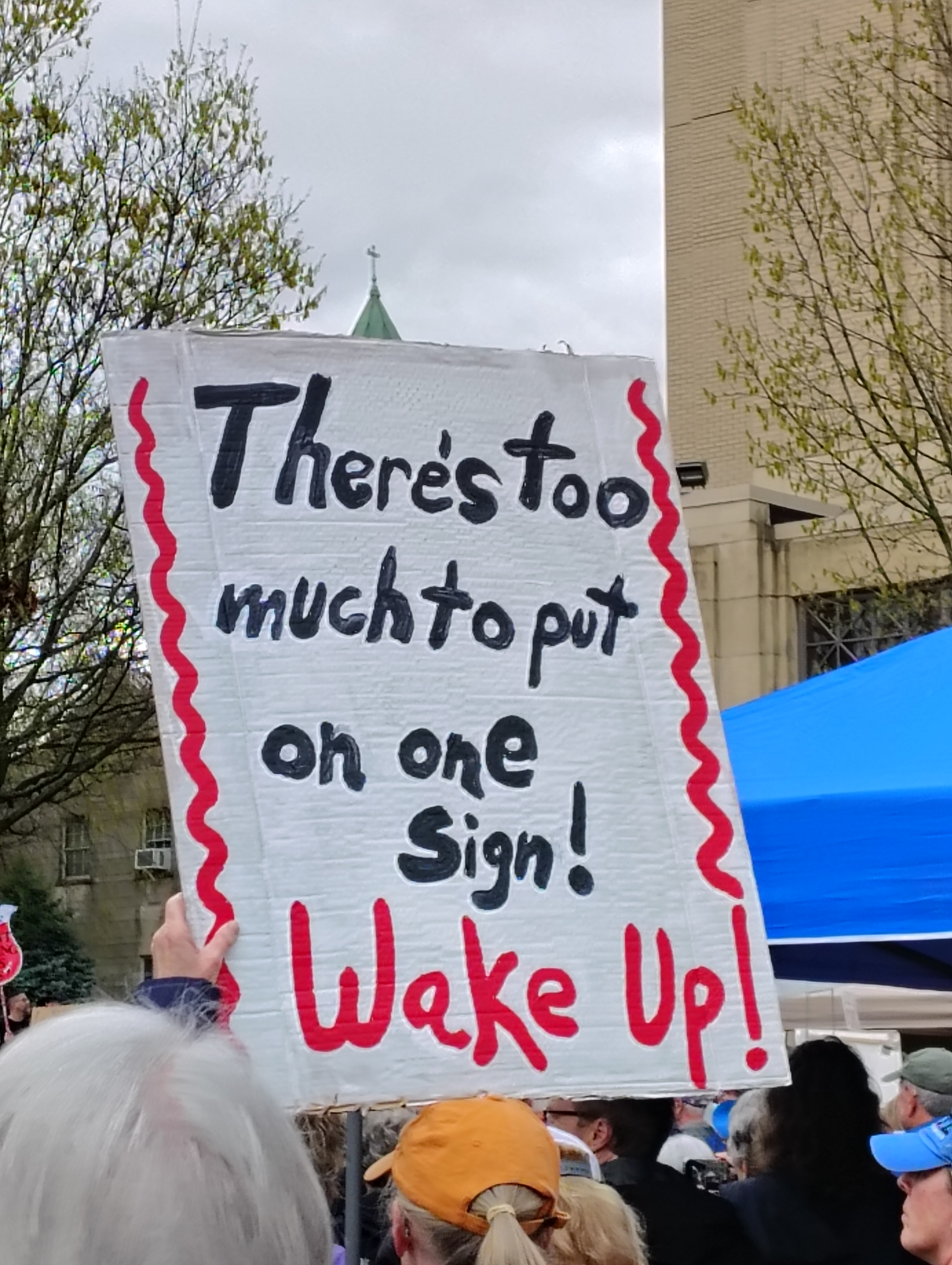
Protest in Lexington, Kentucky

In Alabama, around 500 people gathered at the Alabama State Capitol in Montgomery. Protests were also held in Birmingham and Tuscaloosa.

In Kentucky, protesters in Louisville gathered in Jefferson Square Park. Demonstrations were also held in Bowling Green, Frankfort, Lexington.

In Mississippi, protests were held outside the Mississippi State Capitol in Jackson, as well as in Gulfport, Hattiesburg, and Tupelo.

In Tennessee, protests were held in Knoxville (reportedly with thousands of attendees), Nashville (around 3,000 attendees), Chattanooga, Maryville, Johnson City , Kingsport (around 500), Greeneville, Morristown, and Cookeville.

==== South Atlantic states ====
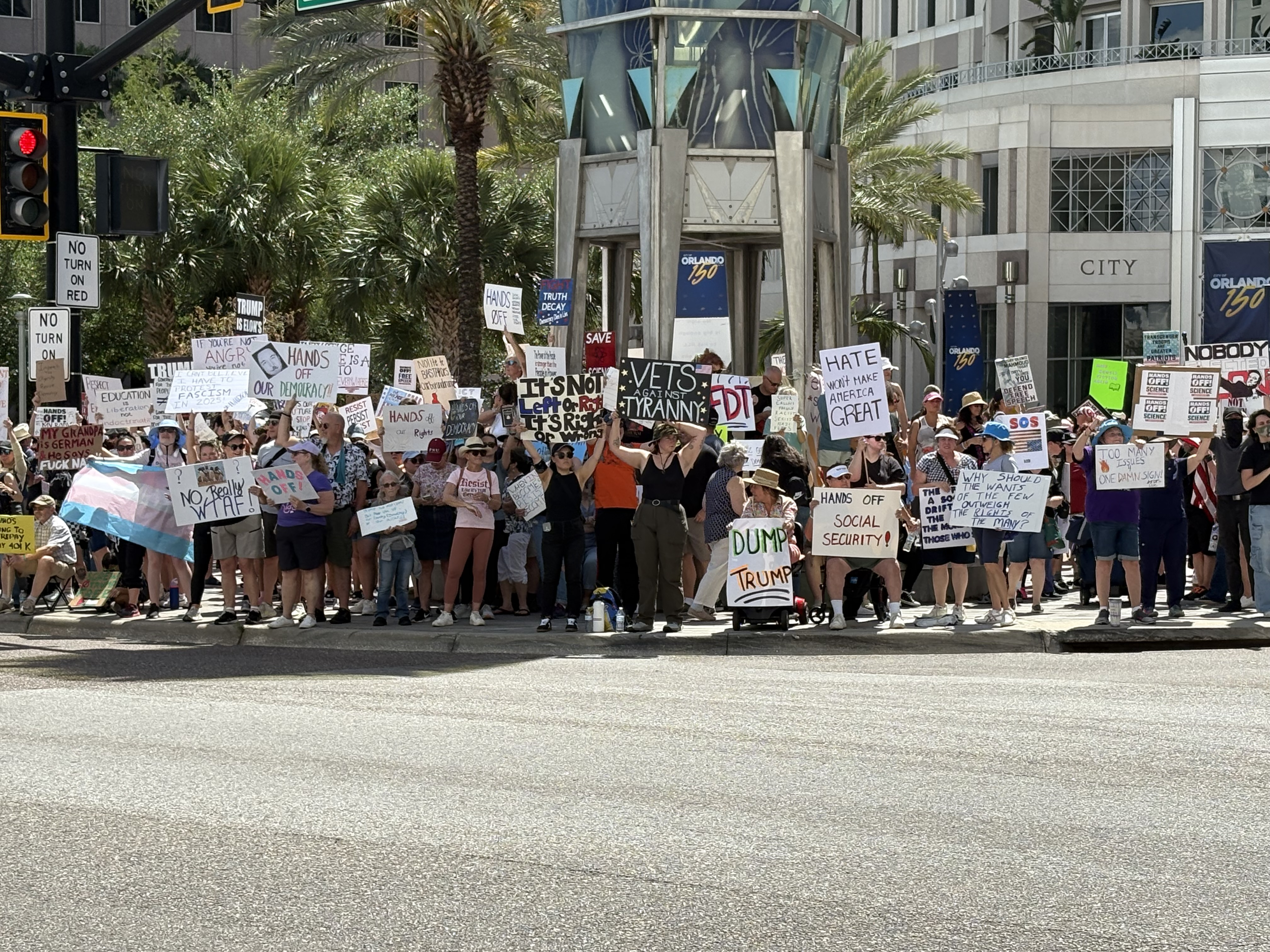
Demonstration in Orlando, Florida

In Delaware, protests took place in Newark, Wilmington, and Rehoboth Beach. Congresswoman Sarah McBride spoke at a protest in Dover.

In Florida, thousands of protesters demonstrated in Miami, joined by about 1,000 protesters in Pensacola, and nearly 2,000 in The Villages, a Republican stronghold retirement community in which organizers attempted to limit the number of online RSVPs to 500. Communities in which hundreds of protesters were reported at each demonstration include Brevard County, Lakeland, Palm Beach Gardens, and in front of the state capital in Tallahassee. Protests were also planned in Daytona Beach, DeLand, Palm Coast, Port Orange, Cocoa, Sanford, St. Petersburg, Hollywood, Key West, Stuart, and Tamarac.

In Georgia, several thousand protesters demonstrated in Atlanta, and hundreds protested in Gainesville. Protests were also held in Athens, Columbus (attended by hundreds), Macon, Woodstock, Rome, and Marietta.

In Maryland, over a thousand protesters demonstrated in Baltimore. Former Governor Martin O'Malley spoke to protesters outside the Social Security Administration offices in Woodlawn. On the Eastern Shore, there were protests in Ocean City and Salisbury. Protests also took place in Frederick, Westminster, Silver Spring (Leisure World) and Olney.

In North Carolina, around 7,500 protesters gathered in Asheville. Protests in the Research Triangle were held in Durham, Pittsboro, and Raleigh. Protests were also held in Charlotte, Fayetteville, Greensboro, Waynesville, Bolivia, Shelby, and Wilmington.

Protests took place at the South Carolina State House in Columbia, in Summerville, Rock Hill, Beaufort, Myrtle Beach, Spartanburg, and in Anderson. The event in Charleston was cancelled due to lack of permit.

In Virginia, protests took place across the state. In the Hampton Roads area of Virginia, thousands of people protested in Norfolk and Williamsburg. Around 4,000 protesters gathered in Charlottesville. In Lynchburg, around 500 attended. Protests were also held in Richmond (around 3,000 protesters), Roanoke (around 1,000 protesters), Abingdon, Danville, Fredericksburg, Leesburg, Manassas (around 1,200 protesters), Christiansburg (around 500 protesters), and Staunton (reportedly hundreds of protesters).

Al Jazeera reported from Washington, D.C., where a crowd protested against the government's sweeping executive actions and restructuring. The proposed reforms would eliminate more than 200,000 federal positions and significantly reduce benefits for the Internal Revenue Service and Social Security.

In West Virginia, a protest was held outside the State Capitol in Charleston. Additional protests were held in Clarksburg, Huntington, Lewisburg, Morgantown, and Wheeling.

==== West South Central states ====
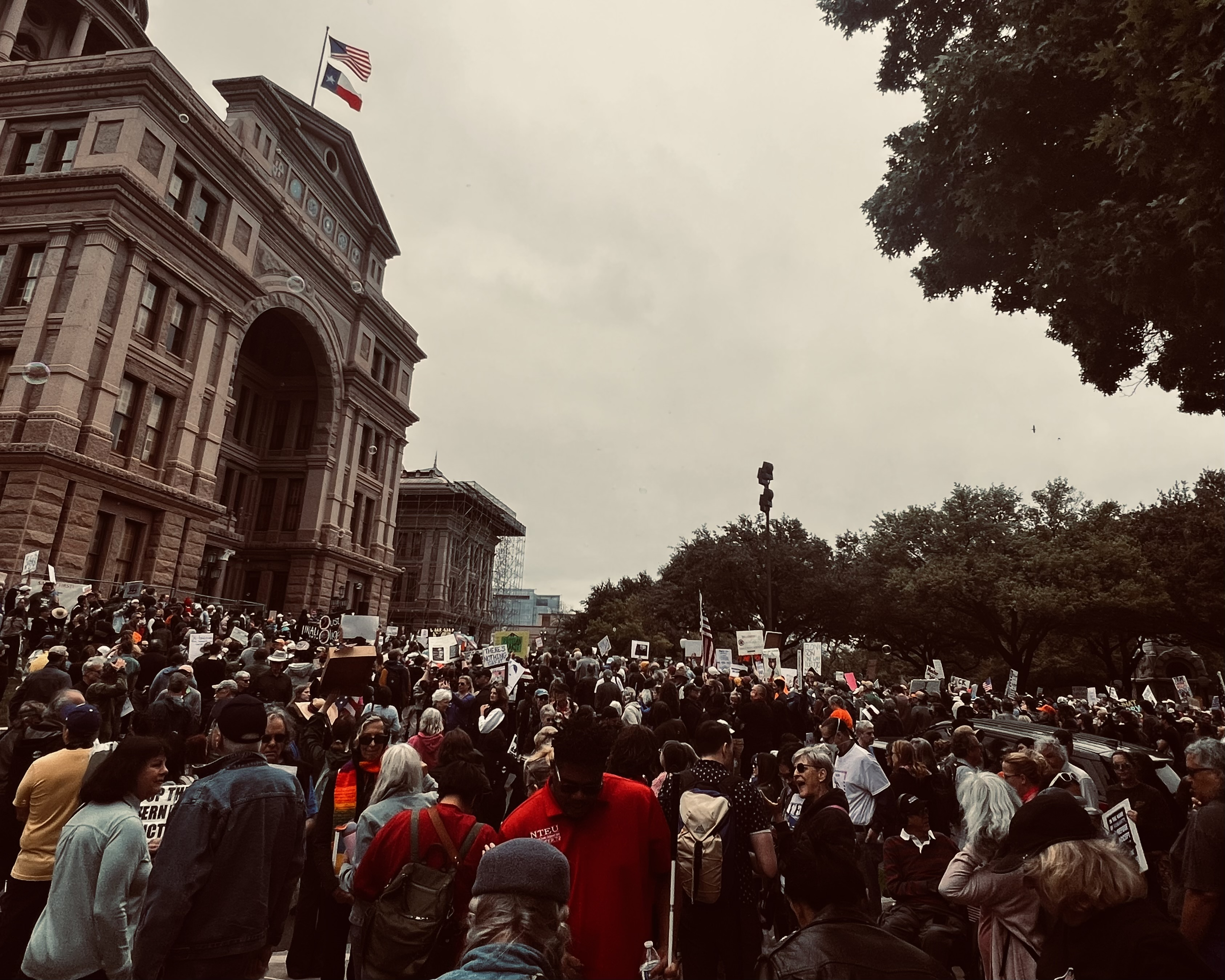
Protesters outside the Texas State Capitol in Austin

Arkansas saw protests in Fayetteville, Eureka Springs, Fort Smith, Russellville, and Monticello. A demonstration planned at Little Rock was postponed a week to April 12 due to heavy rain and storms moving through Central Arkansas on April 5.

In Louisiana, hundreds of protesters gathered in Lafayette Square in New Orleans. Local leaders, including city council members, gave speeches, and one protester set up a Cybertruck piñata. Protests were also held in Baton Rouge, Lafayette, Lake Charles, and Shreveport.

In Oklahoma, more than a thousand protesters gathered outside city hall in Oklahoma City, and hundreds of protesters demonstrated in Tulsa.

In Texas, protests took place across the state, including Frisco and Flower Mound in the Dallas-Fort Worth metroplex. Protests also took place in Austin, Denton, Burleson, San Antonio, Houston, Galveston, and El Paso.

=== Western U.S. ===
==== Mountain states ====
Locations in which protests were planned in Arizona include Casa Grande, Flagstaff, Mesa, Phoenix, Prescott, Scottsdale, Sedona, and Tucson.

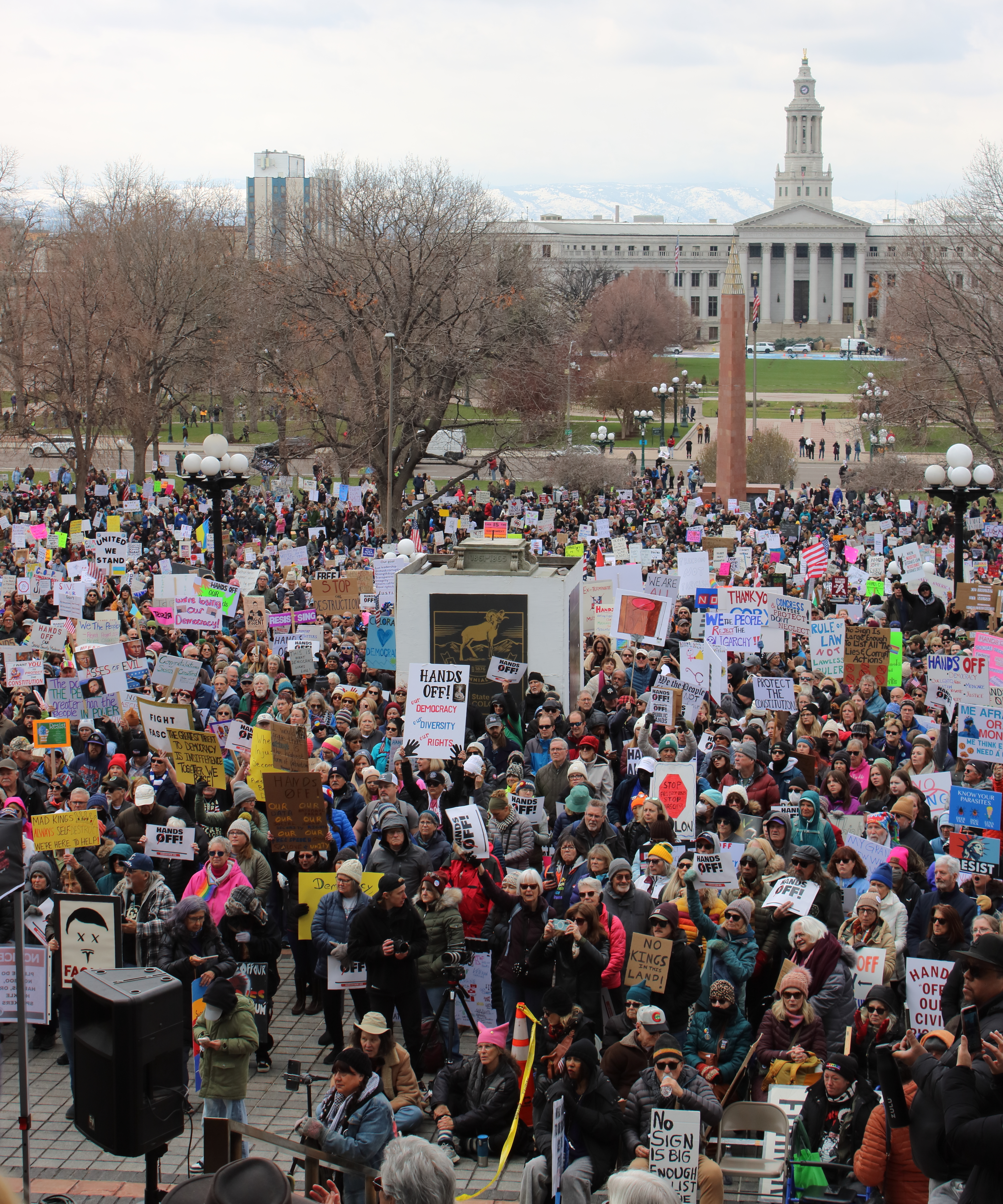
Protesters at the Colorado State Capitol in Denver

In Colorado, thousands attended a protest at the Colorado State Capitol in Denver. In addition, other protests were planned in Arvada, Boulder, Colorado Springs, Fort Collins, Loveland, Highlands Ranch, Greeley, La Junta, Montrose, Steamboat Springs, Pagosa Springs, Alamosa, Lyons, Telluride, Cañon City, Grand Junction, and Pueblo.

In Idaho, about 1,500 protesters gathered outside the Idaho State Capitol in Boise, others in Coeur d'Alene, about 500 in Idaho Falls, about a thousand in Pocatello, and about 300 in Twin Falls.

In Montana, hundreds of protesters gathered outside a courthouse in Billings. Protests were also held in Bozeman, Butte, Helena, Kalispell, and Missoula.

In Las Vegas, protesters gathered outside the New York-New York Hotel and Casino on the Las Vegas Strip. Around 7,000 people demonstrated outside the Nevada State Capitol in Carson City. There was also a protest in Reno.

Around 2,000 protesters gathered outside the New Mexico State Capitol in Santa Fe. Protests were also held in Alamogordo, Albuquerque, Gallup, Las Cruces, Portales, Socorro, and Taos. Protests had also been planned to occur in Ramah and Silver City.

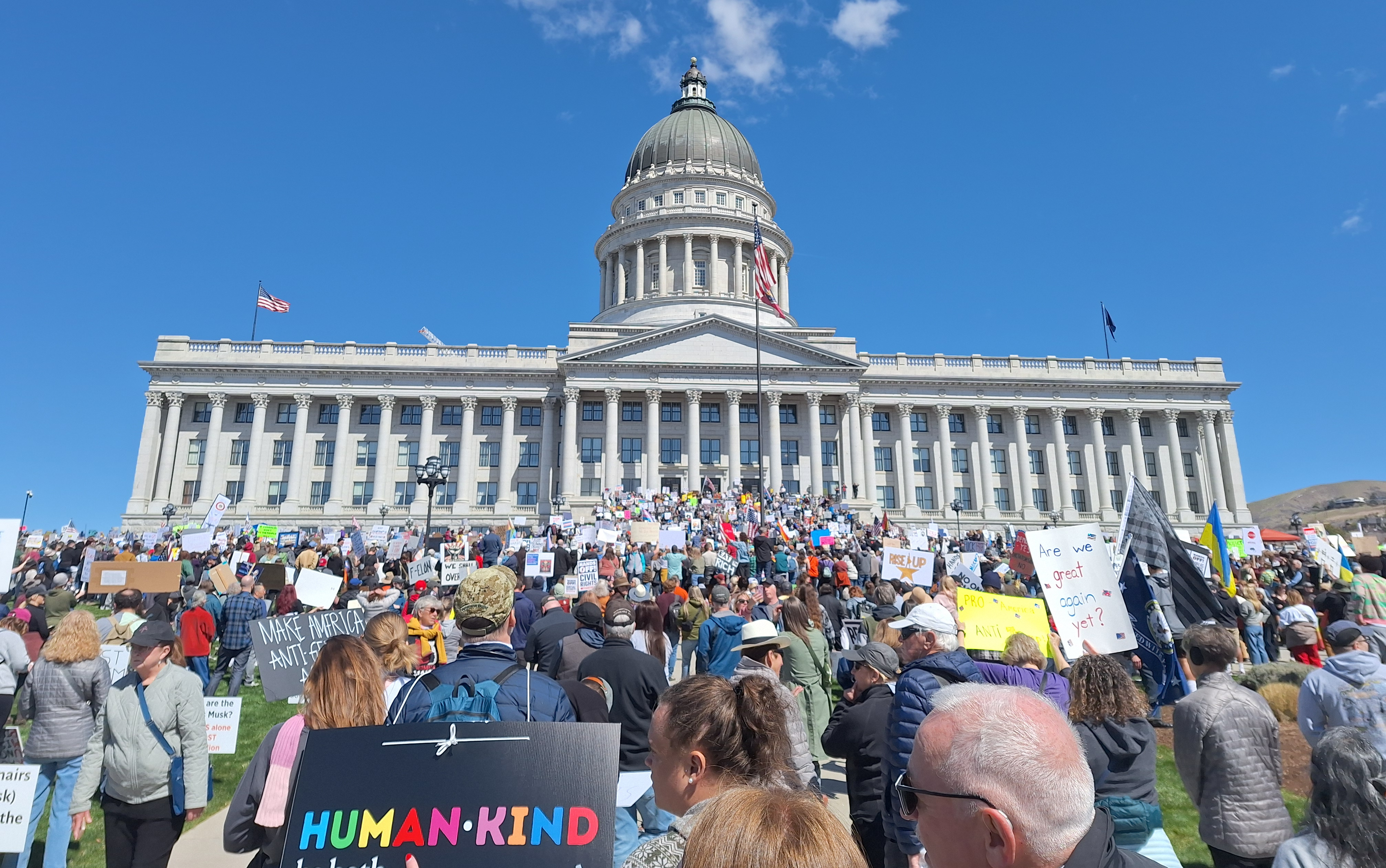
Protesters in front of the Utah State Capitol in Salt Lake City

In Utah, thousands of people demonstrated in Salt Lake City, while more protests occurred in Cache County, Wasatch County, Monticello, Bluff, Moab, Boulder, Kanab and St. George. Residents of a senior living facility held an event for people who could not march.

In Wyoming, approximately 300 protesters gathered outside the Wyoming State Capitol in Cheyenne. Protests were also held in Casper and Rock Springs.

==== Pacific states ====
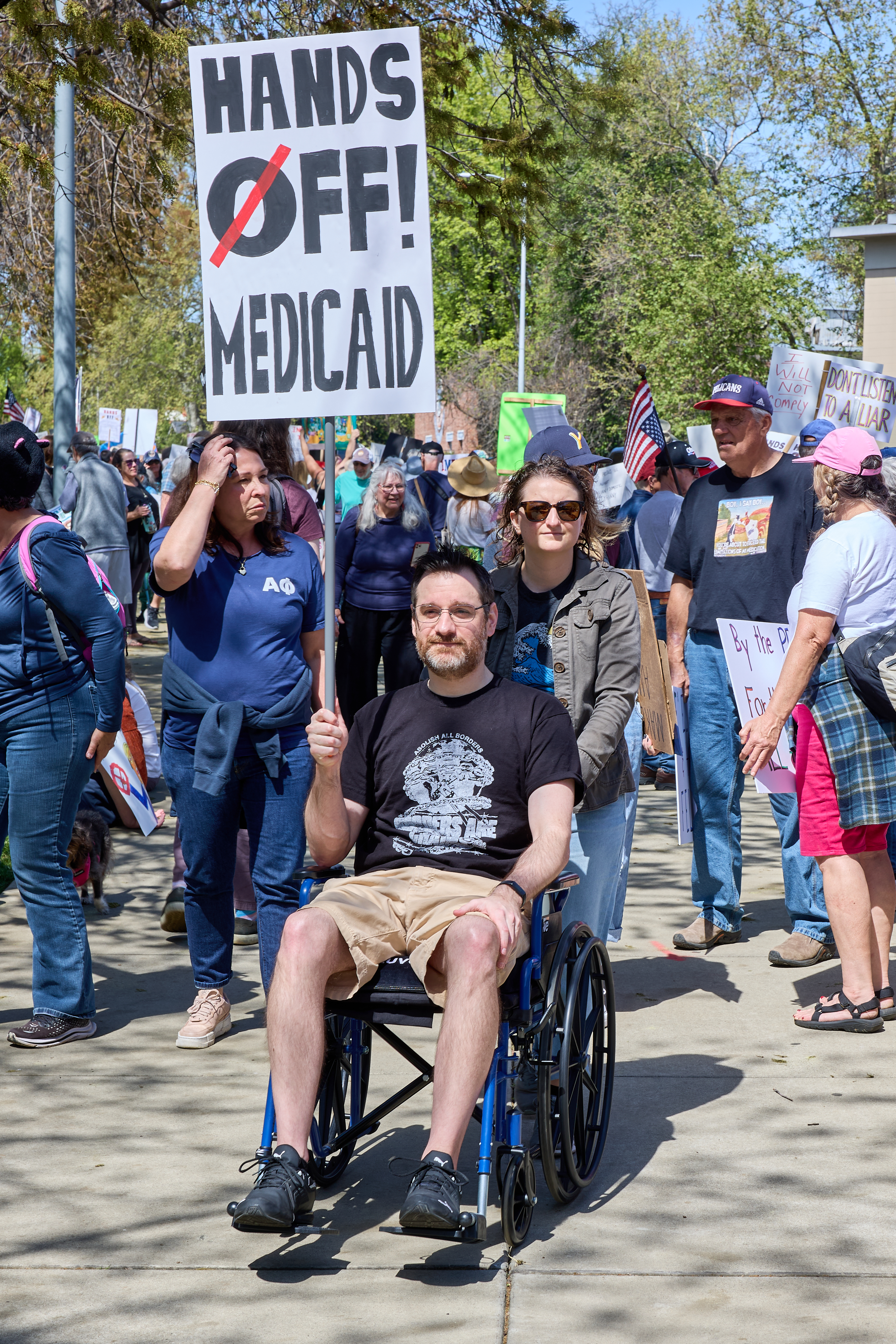
Protesters in Chico, California

In Alaska, demonstrations were held across the state, including Skagway, Haines, Gustavus, Petersburg, Sitka, Ketchikan, Kodiak, Soldotna, Wasilla, Healy, Dillingham, Bethel, Nome, and large crowds in Anchorage and Fairbanks. Over a thousand people protested in Anchorage. There were about 1,000 protesters in Fairbanks. There were also protests in Juneau and Nome's Anvil City Square.

In California, activities took place in Glendale, Huntington Beach, Los Angeles, Riverside, San Bernardino, San Clemente, San Jose, Santa Ana, Claremont, Chino Hills, as well as in Modesto, Rancho Cucamonga, Torrance, Tracy, Sacramento, Rio Vista, Santa Cruz and Livermore. Thousands in the San Francisco Bay Area also took part in the protests, including the cities of San Francisco, Berkley, Oakland, Napa, Santa Rosa, Sonoma, and Sebastopol. Nearly 12,000 packed downtown San Diego, with smaller rallies confirmed in Encinitas, Oceanside and Rancho Bernardo. Residents of a senior living facility held companion event at their complex the day before. Five thousand protested in Santa Barbara. Around 30,000 gathered in Downtown LA.

In Hawaii, thousands of protesters gathered in Honolulu. There was also a protest in Hilo involving around a thousand demonstrators. Protests also took place in Kailua-Kona, Lanai City, Lihue, and Waimea.

In Oregon, several thousand people participated in a protest in Portland; hundreds more participated in Tigard, Madras, Pendleton, Medford and other parts of the state. In downtown Portland, thousands of people gathered at Tom McCall Waterfront Park. The Eugene demonstration, which was attended by thousands of people, was held in front of City Hall. Events were also planned in the cities of Astoria, Bend, Enterprise, Gold Beach, Hood River, Klamath Falls, and Redmond, and in the Portland metropolitan area, including Beaverton and Hillsboro in addition to Tigard.

In Washington, a rally at the Seattle Center was held on April 5 with speeches from U.S. representative Pramila Jayapal and former governor Jay Inslee. An event at the Washington State Capitol is also planned in Olympia. Other regional protests took place in Bellingham, Bremerton, Everett, Kirkland, Longview, Port Angeles, Port Orchard, Poulsbo, Pullman, Spokane, and Vancouver, Washington.

== See also ==
- 3.5% rule – Concept in political science
- 50501 movement – American progressive grassroots movement
- 50501 protests – US demonstrations against Donald Trump
- Economic Blackout – 2025 consumer boycotts in the United States
- No Kings protests
- Protests against Donald Trump – Worldwide demonstrations since 2015
  - Protests against the second presidency of Donald Trump
  - Timeline of protests against Donald Trump
- Tesla Takedown – Grassroots protest movement
