= Upworthy =

American media brand

- Company type: Private
- Website type: News and entertainment
- Available in: English
- Founded: March 14, 2012; 14 years ago
- Headquarters: Los Angeles, California, United States
- Owner: Good Worldwide
- Founders: Eli Pariser and Peter Koechley
- Editor: Eric Pfeiffer (Editor-in-chief)
- CEO: Amanda Farrand
- Website: upworthy.com
- Current status: Active

Upworthy is a media brand that focuses on positive storytelling.

It was started in March 2012 by Eli Pariser, the former executive director of MoveOn, and Peter Koechley, the former managing editor of The Onion. One of Facebook's co-founders, Chris Hughes, was an early investor. At its peak between 2012 and 2014, it reached up to 100 million people a month. In 2017, the company was acquired by Good Worldwide.

== History ==
Upworthy was launched in 2012 with a focus on aggregating positive content, which aligned with Facebook's algorithm. Originally, Upworthy curators searched the internet for existing content to feature on the site. Once selected as an option, curators brainstormed different headlines and shareable images for the content, and tested it with a small sample of Upworthy's visitors before sharing it on the site.

The site popularized a clickbait style of two-phrase headlines. The company simplifies issues that are controversial by nature, which are presented from a politically liberal point of view and are heavily fact-checked for accuracy.

In June 2013, an article in Fast Company called Upworthy "the fastest growing media site of all time". It had 8.7 million unique monthly visitors in the first six months, and in November 2013, had a high of 87 million unique visitors in a single month. In 2013, Facebook changed its algorithm, leading to a significant decline in readers from that platform.

Upworthy fired one round of writers in 2015, and another in 2016, after an unionization effort by some of the staff. The union involved, the Writers Guild of America, East, has organized several online "viral" news publishers.

In January 2017, Upworthy was acquired by media company GOOD Worldwide. The newsrooms of the two organizations would merge as part of the acquisition. About 20 staffers were laid off as part of the merger.

In March 2020, Upworthy saw a 65% increase in Instagram followers and a 47% increased interest in positive content on-site page views as a result of increased interest in positive content during the COVID-19 pandemic.

In January 2023, National Geographic Books bought Good People: Stories From the Best of Humanity from Upworthy, with a publication date of September 3, 2024. The book is described as "a heartwarming collection of first-person tales that will provide comfort and inspiration to anyone who could use a little dose of joy right now". It was created by two senior Upworthy team members, Gabriel Reilich and Lucia Knell, and features 101 stories from Upworthy's audience. The co-creators encouraged Upworthy followers to connect with the brand through questions on their posts, opening the door for organic and personal stories to be shared in the comment sections. The book debuted on The New York Times nonfiction bestseller list on September 22, 2024, and remained on the list for two weeks. The book is seen in the top 10 on Publishers Weekly Fall 2024 Adult Preview: Lifestyle and on The Washington Post's "5 feel-good books".

== See also ==
- Mashable
