= The School Fund =

Crowdfunding platform and nonprofit organization

The School Fund is a person-to-person crowdfunding platform and nonprofit organization through which donors directly contribute to educational scholarships for low-income students in countries that do not offer free, public secondary school. Like other civic crowdfunding platforms, through The School Fund, large numbers of online visitors support philanthropic efforts by pooling small contributions. The School Fund crowdfunds for students who have been identified by their teachers or local school officials as not having enough money to continue paying to go to school.

Globally, 115 million children do not attend school, and school fees contribute to this dropout rate by making education cost-prohibitive for impoverished students in developing countries. School fees often disproportionately affect girls, with many impoverished families dedicating their limited money to educating their sons rather than their daughters.

== Methods ==
The School Fund employs a donation-based crowdfunding model to fund annual student needs, which start at around $150 per year. Donors give online, but some conduct their own small fundraisers offline for individual students before contributing.

Donors receive school receipts showing 100 percent of their donation has been applied to the educational costs of the specific student they opted to fund.

The majority of The School Fund's students reside in sub-Saharan Africa, where education has been tied to poverty reduction and has been linked to improvements in gender equality, health and nutrition, reductions in infant and child mortality and decreases in the prevalence of HIV/AIDS. Similar to Kiva's partnership model The School Fund partners with a network of non-governmental organizations which identify qualified students to post on the crowdfunding platform.

== History ==
The School Fund was founded in 2010 by Matt Severson, Roxana Moussavian and Andrew Perrault, all then Brown University students. The idea to raise money for students' school fees stemmed from Severson's 2007 trip to Tanzania, where he met a boy who could not afford to pay his school fees.

In 2010, The School Fund won the Clinton Global Initiative University (CGI University), University Commitment Challenge and was awarded the Clinton Global Initiative University Outstanding Commitment Award.

In 2012, Grammy Award-nominated singer Carolyn Malachi released her music video for the song "Free Your Mind" on GOOD's online platform with product placement featuring The School Fund. Each view of the video resulted in one hour of classroom time, funded by the #IAMCampaign and Chegg.

In 2013, Education Generation (EdGen) merged with The School Fund.

Since The School Fund's founding, Severson continued heading the nonprofit while simultaneously working at Google.

== Impact of School Fees ==
The School Fund provides scholarships to secondary students for whom educational costs and fees would otherwise limit access to education. Many working children do not go to school or drop out due to the opportunity costs to parents for keeping their children in school instead of working. For many poor households, the expense of school fees prohibits children from attending school altogether.

The United Nations' second Millennium Development Goal is to achieve universal access to primary education, and as one means of doing so, recommends the abolition of school fees that make it difficult for families to send their children to school. In 2013 and after many primary school fees had been eliminated, the UN found that enrollment in primary education in developing regions reached 90 percent in 2010, up from 82 percent in 1999.

Countries that have abolished school fees at the primary level have seen increases in school attendance, with 42 percent increased enrollment in sub-Saharan Africa between 2000 and 2007. When Kenya eliminated primary and reduced secondary fees, attendance went up by 1.3 million students between 2002 and 2004.

In countries that have eliminated primary school fees, increased primary school attendance has not necessarily led to transition rates to secondary school. "Bottlenecks" in these countries' educational systems are often caused by the increased costs families associate with secondary school for tuition fees, uniforms and time away from employment and household chores. Secondary education is more costly per student than primary education and distance to school often increases at the secondary level. By August 2014, The School Fund had assisted over 850 secondary level students, in 15 developing countries.
