= GOOD Worldwide =

American media company

- Type: Private
- Founder: Max Schorr; Ben Goldhirsh; Casey Caplowe
- Headquarters: Los Angeles
- Key people: Max Schorr(CEO)
- Subsidiaries: All In; Upworthy
- Website: https://goodinc.com/

GOOD Worldwide is a United States–based social impact and media company headquartered in Los Angeles. The company was founded in 2006. The company is made up of three organizations: media brands, Upworthy and GOOD, and consumer snack brand, All In.

== Brands ==
GOOD Worldwide consists of three organizations.

=== All In ===
All In is a consumer snack brand that rebranded in June 2025 from its previous name, This Saves Lives, following its acquisition by GOOD Worldwide in 2022. Initially co-founded by Kristen Bell, the brand has changed its formula and is now certified USDA organic and allergen-free. The brand has partnered with Starbucks and Sprouts. The launch received $4M in funding led by Obvious Ventures.

=== GOOD ===
GOOD is a media outlet and produces the online news site www.good.is.

=== Upworthy ===
Upworthy is a media brand that focuses on publishing positive stories. It was started in March 2012 by Eli Pariser and Peter Koechley, and was acquired by GOOD Worldwide in 2017. Originally, Upworthy focused on featuring existing content found elsewhere on the internet, but it later shifted to sharing more original content. In 2021 it was ranked as one of the Top 100 Social Brands, and in 2024 it reached over 100 million people per month.

== History ==
GOOD was co-founded in 2006 by Ben Goldhirsh (son of Inc. magazine founder Bernie Goldhirsh), Max Schorr, and Casey Caplowe. Eschewing experienced editors, he hired friends from college and high school, including Al Gore's son, Al Gore III.

=== Business strategy and launch ===
GOOD was launched in fall of 2006. Instead of traditional marketing strategies, GOOD used their marketing budget to throw launch parties.

GOOD's business strategy included donating its magazine subscription fees entirely to charities, offering subscribers multiple options for which organization their fee supported. In 2009 Goldhirsh said that advertising revenue had allowed the magazine to nearly break-even.

In 2008, GOOD experimented with a three-month long name-your-own-pricing campaign. The campaign was kicked off in conjunction with a concept called the GOOD Sheet, a limited-time weekly newsprint distributed exclusively at Starbucks. Each edition focused on a current affair, such as healthcare or education.

In 2009, GOOD consolidated its brands Reason Pictures, GOOD Magazine, and GOOD Digital, into a single organization - GOOD Worldwide. Around the same time, the company closed a Series A funding round and announced several partnership and investment agreements. These included agreements with Causes, Goodrec, and Govit. GOOD had grown to receiving over 2 million unique website visits a month, while its print magazine was read by around two hundred thousand people.

On August 17, 2011, a joint announcement was made that social network service Jumo would be acquired by GOOD.

In June 2012, most of the magazine's editors were fired. According to Goldhirsh, the decision was made in order to refocus the company on its new website, GOOD.is. Eight former GOOD magazine editors and writers raised funds on Kickstarter to create the one-shot magazine Tomorrow before going their separate ways.

=== 2015-Present ===
In March 2015, GOOD resumed publication of the magazine with a new design and format. In 2017, the magazine received a National Magazine Award.

In February 2016, Good Worldwide hired Nancy Miller, formerly of Wired, Fast Company, and Los Angeles magazine, as editor-in-chief of the digital and print magazine.

In August 2018, Good Media Group laid off 31 employees from its Upworthy site. Upworthy CEO Charlie Wilkie resigned, and Eli Pariser resigned from the board.

In 2024, GOOD Worldwide subsidiary Upworthy, released the nonfiction book “Good People: Stories from the Best of Humanity”, published by National Geographic.
