= December 2019 impeachment protests in the United States =

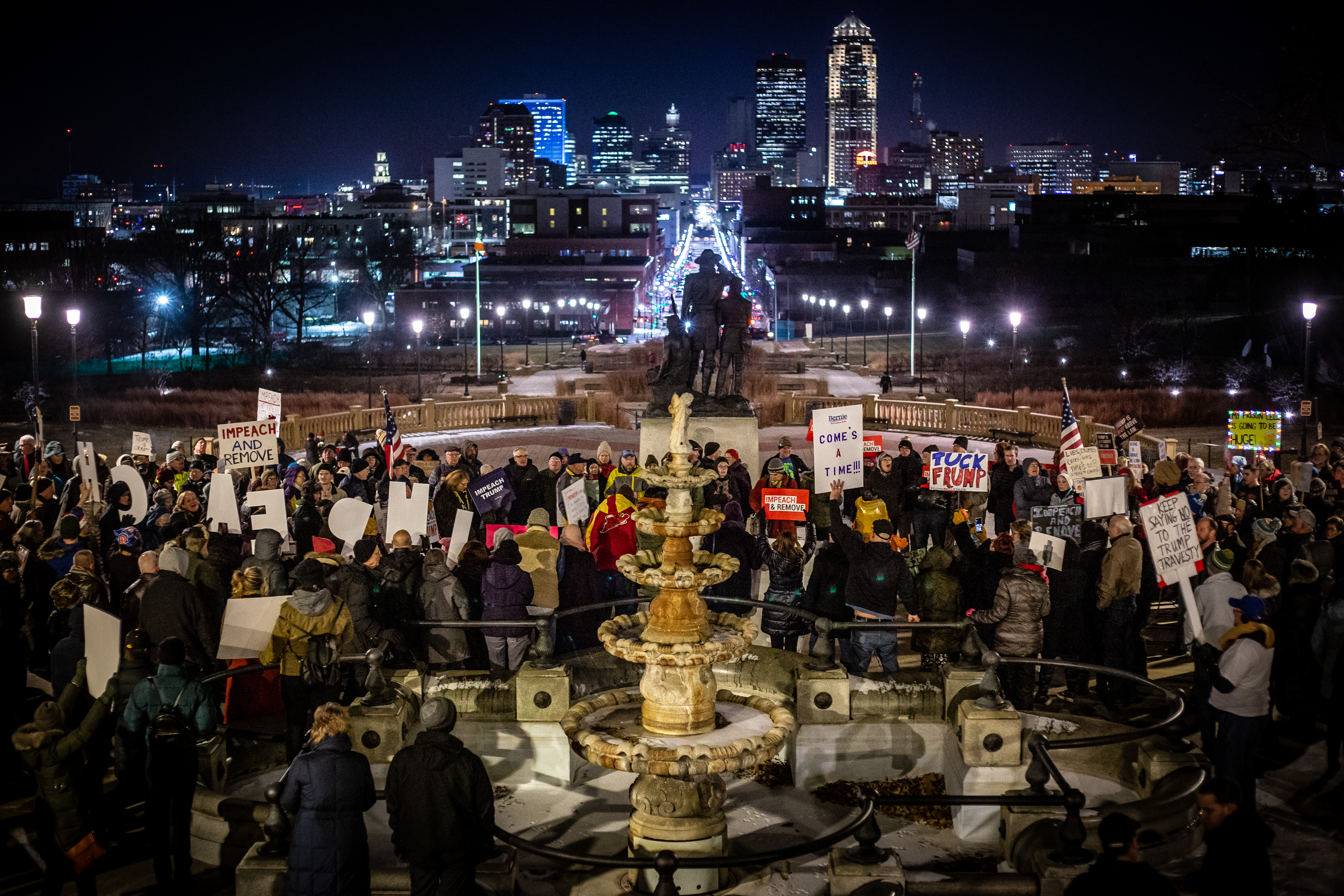
- Impeachment protest in Des Moines on December 17
- Date: December 17–18, 2019
- Location: United States
- Caused by: Support of the impeachment of Donald Trump
- Methods: Protest

During December 17–18, 2019, a series of demonstrations were held in the United States, in support of the impeachment of Donald Trump and his removal from the office of U.S. president. According to organizers MoveOn and Common Cause, more than 600 events were held. The rallies were called "Nobody Is Above the Law" and "Impeach and Remove", and December 17 was dubbed "Impeachment Eve", being held on the day before the House of Representatives' impeachment vote.

Tens of thousands of people participated in the protest. Stand Up America has also been credited as an organizer. The hashtags '#ImpeachAndRemove', '#ImpeachmentEve', and '#NotAboveTheLaw' trended on Twitter in the United States.

== Locations ==
Listed below are the rallies

- AL
- AK
- AZ
- AR
- CA
- CO
- CT
- DC
- DE
- FL
- GA
- HI
- ID
- IL
- IN
- IA
- KS
- KY
- LA
- ME
- MD
- MA
- MI
- MN
- MS
- MO
- MT
- NE
- NV
- NH
- NJ
- NM
- NY
- NC
- ND
- OH
- OK
- OR
- PA
- RI
- SC
- SD
- TN
- TX
- UT
- VT
- VA
- WA
- WV
- WI
- WY

State	Cities	Approximate attendance	Notes
Washington, D.C.		hundreds	outside the US Capitol Building (at 9:30 am on the morning of the vote, Wednesday, December 18)
Alabama	Birmingham	100+	Linn Park
Alabama	Huntsville	150	Madison County Courthouse
Alabama	Mobile	60	RSA Tower (location of Rep. Bradley Byrne's office)
Alabama	Montgomery	70	State Capitol Building
Alaska	Anchorage	150-200	Rep. Don Young’s office building
Arizona	Phoenix	hundreds	Intersection of 24th St. and Camelback Rd, near the office of Senator Martha McSally
Arizona	Tucson	1,000+	protesters surrounded the US District Court and spilled across Granada Avenue, while on the opposite side of Congress Street a handful of Trump supporters stood their ground.
Arkansas	Fayetteville	100+	outside the Historic Washington County Courthouse, around Center Street & College Avenue
Arkansas	Little Rock	200-300	Prospect Building; outside Rep. French Hill's office
California	Arroyo Grande/ Grover Beach	40	intersection of Oak Park and Grand Avenue (all four corners)
California	Bakersfield	50	Liberty Bell in downtown Bakersfield
California	Brea	200	Imperial Hwy & State College Blvd Intersection
California	Carlsbad	hundreds	(3 pm) several freeway overpasses
California	Castro Valley	200+	intersection, Castro Valley Blvd. and Redwood Rd.
California	Chico	200-300	Chico City Plaza
California	Claremont		intersection of Foothill and Indian Hill Blvds
California	Clovis	350	Rep. Devin Nunes' district office
California	El Cajon	hundreds	Parkway Plaza
California	Encinitas	hundreds	(3 pm) several freeway overpasses
California	Escondido		northwestern corner of Valley Parkway & Escondido Blvd
California	Grass Valley	200	corner of Brunswick Rd and Sutton Way
California	Livermore	300	Flagpole Plaza
California	Long Beach	100	Harvey Milk Promenade Park
California	Los Angeles	1,000	Grand Park across from Los Angeles City Hall; actor, director & activist Rob Reiner, actress Alyssa Milano & recently resigned Rep Katie Hill spoke at the rally.
California	Modesto	couple hundred	Opposing rallies were held at intersection corners of Briggsmore and McHenry Avenues
California	Monterey	200	Window on the Bay Park
California	Mountain View	300-400	Gateway Park; intersection of El Camino Real & Castro Street
California	Napa	hundreds	Veterans Memorial Park
California	Oakland	500+	Grand Lake Theater Intersection
California	Orange	hundreds	Orange City Hall – Orange Plaza Square
California	Palm Desert	hundreds	outside the office of MOC Dr. Raul Ruiz, in support of his upcoming vote to impeach
California	Palo Alto	150-200	Lytton Plaza, a block away from Rep. Anna Eshoo's downtown office. A chicken Trump balloon effigy made an appearance.
California	Redding	200+	Dueling rallies on both sides of impeachment were present. The pro-impeachment crowd gathered at Redding City Hall and marched down Cypress Ave across the bridge to Hartnell, where they were met by counter protesters
California	Riverside	200	intersection of 14th and Lime Streets
California	Sacramento	1,500	State Capitol - West Lawn
California	San Diego	250	(Dec. 15) Waterfront Park / County Administration Building; (Dec. 17) Del Mar Heights Freeway overpass banner drop
California	San Francisco	2,000+	office of House Speaker Nancy Pelosi, Federal Building - march down Market Street to Senator Dianne Feinstein's office; Pelosi's daughter, Democratic strategist Christine Pelosi, spoke at the rally
California	San Jose / Santa Clara		corner of Stevens Creek Blvd and S. Winchester Blvd (Santana Row and Valley Fair shopping centers)
California	San Luis Obispo	few hundred	1050 Monterey St - County Courthouse
California	San Rafael	several hundred	San Rafael City Plaza
California	San Ramon	200+	outside San Ramon City Hall
California	Santa Barbara	300	Santa Barbara Courthouse
California	Santa Cruz	300+	Santa Cruz Town Clock
California	Santa Monica	less than 100	Tongva Park, Ocean Ave and Colorado Boulevard
California	Santa Rosa	200-300	Old Courthouse Square
California	Sherman Oaks	400	Sherman Oaks Galleria
California	Sierra Madre	400+	Kersting Court
California	Ventura	400	Ventura County Government Center
California	Victorville	50	Bear Valley Road / Interstate 15 bridge
California	Walnut Creek	several hundred	intersection of Mount Diablo Blvd. and South Main St
California	Watsonville	150	Watsonville City Plaza
California	West Hollywood	hundreds	West Hollywood Park
California	Westlake Village	400	The Promenade at Westlake
Colorado	Aurora		Aurora Public Library
Colorado	Boulder		Boulder Bandshell
Colorado	Colorado Springs	200+	Acacia Park
Colorado	Denver	1,500	office of Senator Cory Gardner / Colorado State Capitol - west steps
Colorado	Fort Collins	hundreds	sidewalk on Shields Street (next to Senator Cory Gardner's Fort Collins office)
Colorado	Grand Junction	100	Grand Junction City Hall; both sides of the impeachment battle clashed
Colorado	Pueblo	100	corner of Abriendo & Union Avenues
Connecticut	Bethel	40	Bethel & Danbury Impeach Rally; Bethel Town Hall Green
Connecticut	Fairfield	240	Fairfield Town Hall Green
Connecticut	Manchester	35	corner of Main & Center Street near the Library
Connecticut	New Haven	dozens	New Haven City Hall
Connecticut	Stamford	hundreds	Stamford Government Center
Connecticut	West Hartford	100	outside West Hartford Town Hall
Connecticut	Willimantic	hundreds	(Dec. 16, 5pm) corner of Jackson & Main Sts. opposite the Frog Bridge; the rally was held a day early because of impending winter weather.
Delaware	Wilmington	50	DECO Food Court / Tubman-Garrett Riverfront Park
Florida	Bradenton	200+	steps of Manatee County Courthouse
Florida	Cape Coral	200+	In Lee County, people on both sides of the impeachment debate gathered outside Rep. Francis Rooney's office. Democratic Congressional candidate Cindy Banyai supported the protesters.
Florida	Doral	dozens	Trump National Doral Golf Club
Florida	Fort Lauderdale		Federal Courthouse
Florida	Lakeland	200+	office of Rep Ross Spano; Lakeland police closed off a portion of downtown Lakeland after a bomb threat was made during the rally
Florida	Melbourne	500	County Government Building, Viera; 150-200 demonstrators gathered outside the office of Rep Bill Posey
Florida	Miami	300	The Torch of Friendship at Bayside Marketplace
Florida	Naples	hundreds	Collier County Courthouse
Florida	Ormond Beach	230	Granada Bridge across the street from Ormond Beach City Hall
Florida	Pensacola	100+	corner of Garden and Palafox Streets
Florida	St. Petersburg	300	North Straub Park
Florida	Sarasota	200	Sarasota Federal Building
Florida	South Venice	700	Walmart Corner of US 41 and Jacaranda Blvd; area residents on both sides of impeachment used the busy intersection as their stomping ground
Florida	Stuart	400+	Rep. Brian Mast's office / north side of Roosevelt Bridge
Florida	Tampa	150+	Sam Gibbons United States Courthouse
Florida	West Palm Beach	several hundred	outside Mandel Public Library & the office of Senator Rick Scott
(Georgia (U.S. state)) Georgia	Atlanta	nearly 400	outside the office of Senator David Perdue, in Buckhead
(Georgia (U.S. state)) Georgia	Savannah	100+	Rep. Buddy Carter’s office
Hawaii	Hilo	150	Hilo Bayfront near the King Kamehameha Statute
Hawaii	Honolulu		along Ala Moana Blvd, on the grassy area between the Federal Building and Halekauwila
Hawaii	Kahului (Maui)	200+	Mauka sidewalk area along Ka'ahumanu Ave, between Wakea and Kane St
Idaho	Boise	200	Idaho State Capitol Building, Front Street; 15 counter-protesters were also present
Illinois	Arlington Heights	175	corner of Arlington Heights Road and Northwest Highway
Illinois	Chicago	2,000	Federal Center & Plaza – Trump Tower
Illinois	Elmhurst	150+	outside the Wilder Mansion
Illinois	Evanston	500+	Fountain Square
Illinois	Frankfort		corners of Route 30 and LaGrange; handfuls of pro-Trump supporters in vehicles clashed with protesters
Illinois	Naperville	400+	Dandelion Fountain, Naperville Riverwalk Grand Pavilion
Illinois	Peoria	200	Campustown Intersection/Main & University Streets
Illinois	Springfield		outside Rep. Darin LaHood's district office
Illinois	Western Springs	dozens	Water Tower at Tower Green
Indiana	Evansville		Winfield K. Denton Federal Building and U.S. Courthouse; dueling rallies took place
Indiana	Fort Wayne	60+	Allen County Court House
Indiana	Indianapolis	200	Indiana Statehouse
Indiana	South Bend	50	Senator Mike Braun’s South Bend office
Indiana	Terre Haute	6	Vigo County Courthouse
Iowa	Cedar Rapids		US Federal Courthouse
Iowa	Davenport	85	offices of Senators Joni Ernst & Chuck Grassley
Iowa	Des Moines	300	Iowa Capitol Building - Front Lawn
Iowa	Sioux City	30	Federal Courthouse
Kansas	Overland Park	400	Senator Pat Roberts' office
Kansas	Wichita	dozens	Senator Jerry Moran's office
Kentucky	Bowling Green	dozens	Fountain Square Park
Kentucky	Lexington	hundreds	A rally was held outside Robert F. Stephens Courthouse Plaza, followed by a six-block march in downtown Lexington
Kentucky	Louisville	several hundred	outside Metro Hall & Sen. Mitch McConnell's Louisville office
Louisiana	Baton Rouge		Louisiana Capitol
Louisiana	Metairie		Rep. Steve Scalise's office
Louisiana	New Orleans		Bourbon St in the French Quarter
Maine	Auburn	dozen	Longley Bridge between Lewiston & Auburn
Maine	Bangor	50	(Dec. 16) Rep. Jared Golden's office / (Dec. 17) Luther H. Peirce Memorial Park / Hope House
Maine	Bar Harbor	100+	Village Green, corner of Main Street and Mt. Desert Street
Maine	Belfast	few dozen	Post Office Square
Maine	Brunswick	250+	Brunswick Town Hall
Maine	Machias		The easternmost rally of the moment, at The Dike
Maine	Portland	450	Monument Square
Maine	Rockland	140	Chapman Park
Maryland	Annapolis	100+	City Dock (by Alex Haley Memorial)
Maryland	Baltimore	hundreds	McKeldin Square
Maryland	Bel Air	150	Downtown Bel Air, across from Rep. Andy Harris' office
Maryland	Catonsville	150	in front of the office of the late Rep. Elijah Cummings
Maryland	Columbia	200+	intersection of Broken Land & Little Patuxent parkways outside The Mall
Maryland	Gaithersburg		Gaithersburg City Hall
Maryland	Olney	dozens	Olney Manor Recreational Park
Massachusetts	Belchertown	50	Belchertown Town Common
Massachusetts	Boston	several hundred	Boston Common, near the State House. Former Massachusetts Governor Bill Weld spoke to the crowd.
Massachusetts	Cambridge	200	Cambridge Town Hall
Massachusetts	Concord	350	First Parish Church, front steps
Massachusetts	Falmouth	70+	Falmouth Town Green
Massachusetts	Gloucester	100+	Gloucester Rotary, Grant Circle
Massachusetts	Hyannis	300	public walkways along Route 132 near the Cape Cod Mall and K-Mart plaza
Massachusetts	Milford	50+	Milford Town Hall
Massachusetts	Newburyport	100+	Market Square
Massachusetts	Norwell	50	Norwell Town Hall
Massachusetts	Pittsfield	150	Park Square
Massachusetts	Reading	100	Reading Common
Massachusetts	Salem	30	Riley Plaza, across from Post Office
Massachusetts	Sandwich	80+	Mill Creek Park
Massachusetts	Springfield	20	Rep. Richard Neal's office / Federal Courthouse on State St
Massachusetts	Worcester	50	Worcester City Hall
Michigan	Ann Arbor	hundreds	Ann Arbor Post Office; Mayor Christopher Taylor spoke at the rally.
Michigan	Detroit	125	Sen. Debbie Stabenow's Detroit office
Michigan	Ferndale	several hundred	corner of 9 Mile and Woodward Ave
Michigan	Flint	several dozen	Flint City Hall
Michigan	Grand Rapids	200	Veterans Memorial Park
Michigan	Kalamazoo	60	Rep. Fred Upton's office; Kalamazoo Urban Nature Park
Michigan	Lansing	250	State Capitol Building
Michigan	Midland	dozens	Ned S. Arbury Centennial Park
Michigan	Monroe	80+	West Elm Ave & North Monroe St, St Mary Park
Michigan	Rochester Hills	485	The rally occurred in freezing temperatures outside Rep. Elissa Slotkin's office
Minnesota	Duluth	60	Minnesota Power Plaza
Minnesota	Minneapolis	100	Hennepin County Government Center
Minnesota	Saint Paul	400	Saint Paul Capitol
Mississippi	Starkville		Oktobbeha County Chancery Clerk Building
Mississippi	Tupelo		Rep. Trent Kelly's District Office
Missouri	Ballwin	350	Rep. Ann Wagner's office
Missouri	Kansas City	200	Mill Creek Park near the entrance to the Plaza
Missouri	Springfield	several dozen	corner of Battlefield and Glenstone
Montana	Billings	three dozen	Yellowstone Court House Lawn
Montana	Bozeman	200+	Gallatin County courthouse
Montana	Helena	200	Montana Capitol Building, north side steps
Montana	Missoula	200+	Rep. Greg Gianforte's office & Sen. Steve Daines' office; hundreds of people on both sides took to the streets
Nebraska	Grand Island	20+	in front of Rep Adrian Smith's office
Nebraska	Lincoln	250	Robert V. Denney Federal Building and U.S. Court House
Nebraska	Omaha	couple hundred	Midtown Crossing at Turner Park
Nevada	Carson City	100	sidewalk in front of Nevada State Legislature
Nevada	Las Vegas	hundreds	Lloyd D. George United States Federal Courthouse
Nevada	Pahrump	1	This pro-impeachment rally, scheduled for 5:30 pm at the intersection of Highway 160 and Crawford Way, did not quite go as planned, as only one member showed up. It was also countered 90 minutes earlier by a group of 50 pro-Trump supporters.
Nevada	Reno	few hundred	Reno City Plaza
New Hampshire	Dover	75	Henry Law Park
New Hampshire	Nashua	100	Downtown Nashua office of Sen. Jeanne Shaheen; both protesters & counter-protesters stood outside in freezing weather
New Hampshire	New London	45	gazebo & Main St
New Hampshire	Portsmouth	100	Portsmouth Market Square
New Jersey	Glen Rock	60	Rep. Josh Gottheimer's office
New Jersey	Mays Landing	300	Rep. Jeff Van Drew's office; Van Drew would vote against impeachment, then switch to the GOP, much to the disgust of the protesters.
New Jersey	Montclair	125-150	Public Gathering Space at corner of Bloomfield & Church Street; BlueWaveNJ rally at Five Corners
New Jersey	New Brunswick	150	New Brunswick City Hall, clerk's office
New Jersey	Newark	30	outside the offices of Senators Bob Menendez & Cory Booker, 1 Gateway Ctr.
New Jersey	Princeton	400+	Princeton Hinds Plaza
New Jersey	South Orange	125-150	South Orange Train Station
New Jersey	Summit	100	Summit Train Station
New Mexico	Albuquerque	200	public sidewalks, Central and Girard Intersection
New Mexico	Las Cruces	100	Albert Johnson Park
New Mexico	Santa Fe		intersection of St. Francis Drive & Cerrillos Road
New York	Binghamton	40	Metro Center - in front on the sidewalk; Rep. Anthony Brindisi's office
New York	Buffalo		Bidwell Park, corner of Elmwood Ave & Bidwell Pkwy
New York	Cobleskill,		Veteran's Park
New York	Colonie	hundreds	corner of Wolf Road and Central Avenue
New York	Glens Falls		Glens Falls City Park - Rep. Elise Stefanik's office; protesters were met by a group of Trump supporters
New York	Hudson	50	outside Rep. Antonio Delgado’s Hudson office
New York	Huntington Station	250	Huntington Village, NW Corner of Park Ave & Main St.
New York	Jamestown	50	Dow Park; Rep. Tom Reed's office
New York	New York City	thousands	Times Square
New York	Oneonta	50+	Muller Plaza
New York	Patchogue	300-700	outside Rep. Lee Zeldin's office
New York	Peekskill		Sen. Chuck Schumer's Peekskill office
New York	Potsdam	17	Potsdam High School parking lot
New York	Syracuse	200	outside of the Federal Office Building
North Carolina	Asheville	hundreds	Vance Monument / Pack Square Park
North Carolina	Charlotte	200	Mecklenburg County Democratic Party Headquarters; Marshall Park
North Carolina	Hillsborough	250	Old Courthouse
North Carolina	New Bern	150+	Union Point Park
North Carolina	Raleigh	500+	Bicentennial Plaza
North Carolina	Sylva	few dozen	Mill Street; a Trump supporter disrupted the rally with his pickup truck and a “Rambo” flag
North Carolina	Winston-Salem	200	Grace Court
North Dakota	Fargo	three dozen	sidewalk outside Rep. Kelly Armstrong's office (in sub-zero temperatures)
North Dakota	Minot	dozen	Ward County Court House
Ohio	Bowling Green		Wooster Greenspace
Ohio	Cincinnati	175+	Cincinnati Fountain Square
Ohio	Cleveland	hundreds	(5 pm) Market Square Park, West 25th Street & Lorain; (7 pm) Cuyahoga County Democratic Party office
Ohio	Columbus	1,500	Graceland Shopping Center
Ohio	Cuyahoga Falls	200 - 500+	corner of Portage Trail and Front Street
Ohio	Dayton	200	Rep. Mike Turner's office building
Ohio	Lima	40	Lima Town Square
Ohio	Toledo	50-70	"Honk for Impeachment" rally at southeast corner of Central & Secor
Oklahoma	Claremore	60	Rep. Markwayne Mullin’s Claremore District office; residents came out both for and against impeachment
Oklahoma	Oklahoma City	50	DCCC Offices/Rep. Kendra Horn Campaign HQ; One Western Plaza office building
Oklahoma	Tulsa	150	21st Street & Utica Avenue, outside Sen. Jim Inhofe’s office
Oregon	Astoria	150+	16th & Marine Drive
Oregon	Bend	hundreds	Greenwood Avenue & Bond Street
Oregon	Corvallis	several hundred	Benton County Courthouse
Oregon	Eugene	1,000	Wayne Lyman Morse Federal Courthouse
Oregon	Grants Pass	130	Josephine County Courthouse; rally hosted by Rogue Indivisible
Oregon	Medford	200	Vogel Plaza
Oregon	Portland	1,500-2,000	Tom McCall Waterfront Park (North End) / intersection of NW Murray Blvd and NW Cornell
Oregon	Salem	300	State Capitol
Pennsylvania	Beaver	200	Beaver County Court House
Pennsylvania	Bethlehem	200	Rose Garden Park
Pennsylvania	Greensburg	100+	Westmoreland County Courthouse
Pennsylvania	Harrisburg	200	Harrisburg State Capitol steps
Pennsylvania	Lancaster	hundreds	Penn Square
Pennsylvania	Langhorne	100+	Rep. Brian Fitzpatrick's office, One Summit Square
Pennsylvania	Philadelphia	hundreds	Thomas Paine Plaza; northwest corner of City Hall
Pennsylvania	Pittsburgh	700+	Two rallies were held; one at City County Building Christmas tree (300+ people), the other near the office of Rep. Conor Lamb at Mt. Lebanon (400 people)
Pennsylvania	West Chester	couple hundred	Chester County Courthouse
Rhode Island	Providence	250-300	Rhode Island State House
South Carolina	Beaufort	150	outside Rep. Joe Cunningham's Beaufort office
South Carolina	Greenville	hundreds	Greenville City Hall
South Carolina	Rock Hill		Fountain Park
South Dakota	Sioux Falls		(Dec 18) 41st and Kiwanis Ave
Tennessee	Bristol	20	Bristol TN/VA Sign
Tennessee	Franklin	dozen	Franklin's main square
Tennessee	Knoxville	100+	Downtown congressional offices
Tennessee	Memphis	two dozen	outside of Logan's Restaurant on corner of Poplar & Ridgeway Loop
Tennessee	Nashville	100+	Federal Courthouse on Broadway
Texas	Arlington	100+	office of Rep. Ron Wright
Texas	Austin	hundreds	(10 am) The Texas State Capitol / (5:30 pm) Austin City Hall
Texas	Fort Worth	300	office of Rep. Kay Granger
Texas	Galveston	80	sidewalk in front of Menard Park
Texas	Houston	~120	outside the office of Senator Ted Cruz, at Mickey Leland Federal Building
Texas	Plano	100	Rep. Van Taylor’s office
Texas	Richardson	hundreds	Dallas, Texas Coalition to Impeach and Remove; Rep. Colin Allred's office
Texas	San Antonio	hundreds	Milam Park / Plaza de Zacate / Hipolito F. Garcia Federal Building (office of Rep Will Hurd)
Utah	Salt Lake City	1,000	Federal Wallace Building
Vermont	Brattleboro	44	Pliny Park
Vermont	Essex Junction	250	Five Corners
Vermont	Middlebury	100	Cross Street Bridge
Vermont	Rutland	50	Main Street Park
Virginia	Charlottesville		Albemarle County Office Building
Virginia	Richmond	100+	outside Sen. Tim Kaine's office; meanwhile, a small crowd known as “Black Voices for Trump” held a roundtable discussion at Boogaloos Bar and Grill in the Brookland Park area
Virginia	Virginia Beach	100	Independence and Virginia Beach Boulevard
Virginia	Williamsburg	couple hundred	James City County Courthouse
Washington	Bainbridge Island		Waypoint Park
Washington	Bellingham	500+	Bellingham City Hall
Washington	Everett	hundreds	busy sidewalks of North Broadway (3900 Block)
Washington	Issaquah		Gilman Boulevard; Rep. Kim Schrier's district office
Washington	Langley		Cascade Avenue
Washington	Olympia	couple hundred	State Capitol Legislative Building, north steps
Washington	Redmond	hundreds	Redmond Downtown Park
Washington	Seattle	2,500	(3:30 pm) The 50th street overpass over I-5, North Seattle; (5 pm) Henry M. Jackson Federal Building Plaza. Seattle Mayor Jenny Durkan and King County Executive Dow Constantine were among the speakers who addressed the crowd.
Washington	Sequim	200	corners of Sequim Ave and Washington Streets
Washington	Spokane	230+	(2 pm) I-90 Overpass in Spokane County; (5:30 pm) Thomas S. Foley Federal Courthouse
Washington	Tacoma	200	US Courthouse / Tacoma Union Station
Washington	Vancouver	hundreds	Esther Short Park
Washington	Wenatchee	125	Memorial Park
West Virginia	Charleston	several dozen	Robert C. Byrd US Courthouse; both sides stood on out opposite ends
West Virginia	Huntington		outside of the District Office of Rep. Carol Miller
Wisconsin	Madison	200	State Capital Building
Wisconsin	Milwaukee	few hundred	sidewalk outside Sen. Ron Johnson’s district office on Wisconsin Ave.
Wyoming	Jackson	60	Jackson Town Square; protesters braved single-digit temperatures
