= Jumo =

Social network service and website

Jumo, Inc.
- Company type: Private; Acquired by GOOD
- Website type: social network service
- Available in: English
- Headquarters: Palo Alto, California
- Area served: Worldwide
- Founder: Leor R.
- Key people: Leor R. (Executive Director)
- Launched: November 30, 2010
- Current status: Inactive

Jumo was a social network service and website launched on November 30, 2010, to index charities so that people can find and evaluate them. Jumo was founded by Facebook co-founder Chris Hughes. On August 17, 2011, he announced Jumo was merging with the GOOD organization, providing a social engagement platform to complement their magazine content.

Jumo reported raising $3.5 million in donations and sponsorships prior to its launch, including up to $750,000 from Omidyar Network.

== Acquisition ==
On August 17, 2011, Jumo announced that it had been acquired by the GOOD, a collaborative magazine and event media company headquartered in Los Angeles, USA. The company blog states the purpose to be "to create a powerful online content and social engagement platform". One of the reasons behind that acquisition is believed to be that Jumo's platform was not receiving the level of user traffic it has anticipated to grow itself.

== Open source ==
Two months after being acquired by GOOD, Jumo announced the release of their entire code base into the public domain on October 5, 2011. With this release, the company said that "the community will have access to functionality that enables users to create and curate content and actions around more than 250 issue areas, from human trafficking to childhood obesity".
