= Sean Eldridge =

American political activist (born 1986)

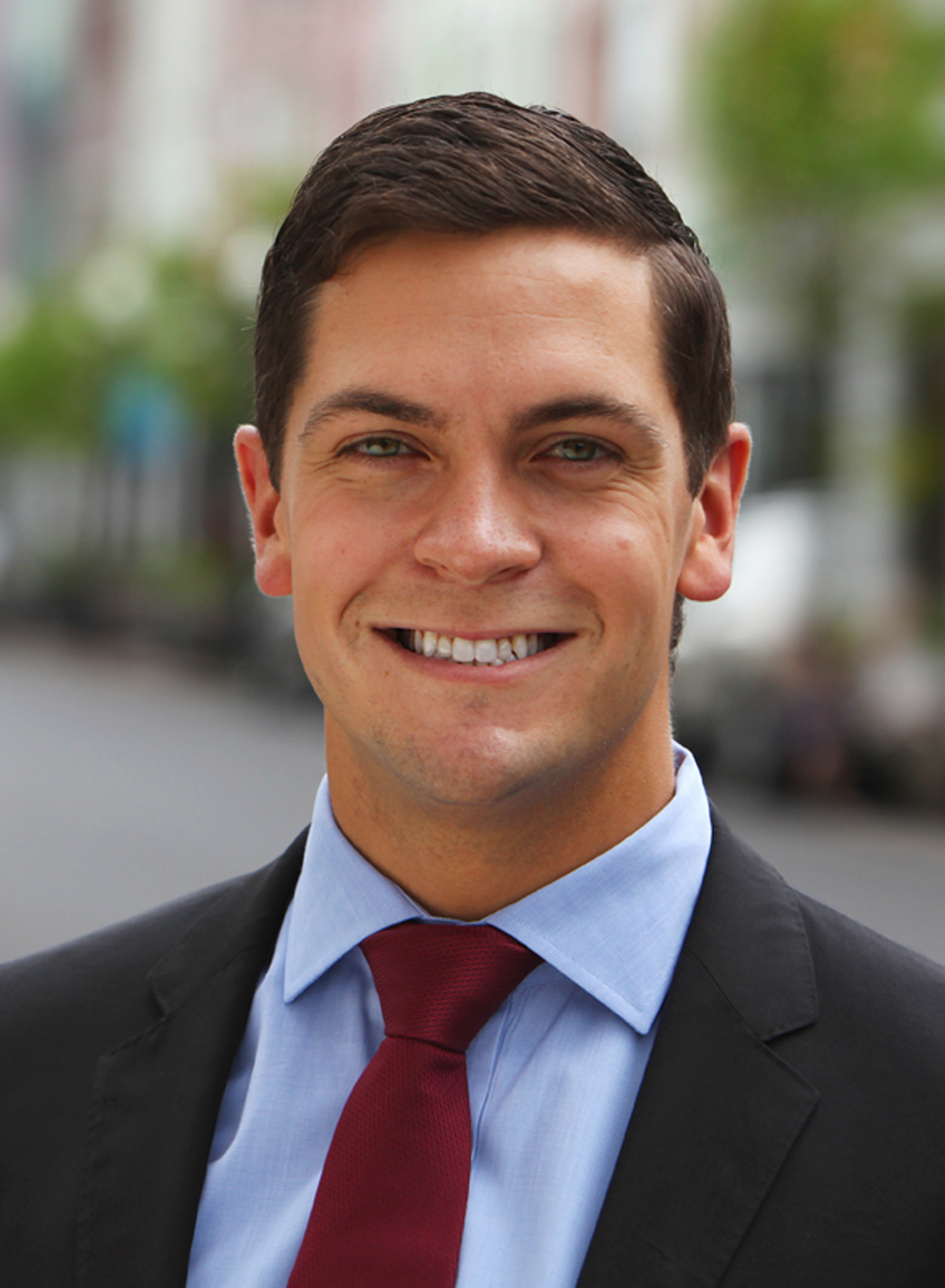
- Born: July 31, 1986 (age 40); Montreal, Quebec, Canada
- Citizenship: Canada; United States
- Education: Deep Springs College (AA); Brown University (BA); Columbia University (attended)
- Known for: Freedom to Marry; Stand Up America
- Political party: Democratic
- Spouse: Chris Hughes (m. 2012)
- Children: 1

Sean Eldridge (born July 31, 1986) is an American political activist from New York. Eldridge is the founder and president of Stand Up America, a progressive advocacy community. He previously served as political director of Freedom to Marry, an organization advocating for the legalization of same-sex marriage. Eldridge ran for Congress in New York's 19th congressional district in 2014, but was defeated. He is the spouse of Facebook co-founder Chris Hughes.

== Early life and education ==
Eldridge was born in Montreal, Quebec. He grew up in the suburbs of Toledo, Ohio, and attended public school in Ottawa Hills, a suburb of Toledo. Both of his parents are medical doctors; his father, Steve Eldridge, is a radiologist, and his mother, Sarah Taub, is a family physician. His mother was born in Petah Tikva, Israel, to Jewish refugee parents, and his father converted to Judaism.

Eldridge studied at Deep Springs College in Deep Springs, California, and graduated with a degree in philosophy from Brown University in Providence, Rhode Island, where he helped organize the national Students for Barack Obama campaign in 2007. Eldridge enrolled at Columbia Law School in New York City but withdrew to join Freedom to Marry.

== Career ==
After the New York Senate voted down same-sex marriage legislation in 2009, Eldridge joined Freedom to Marry, the campaign to win marriage equality nationwide. He served initially as communications director and then as political director, a role in which he helped lead the successful 2011 effort to legalize same-sex marriage in New York.

Following the legalization of same-sex marriage in New York State, Eldridge founded the investment fund Hudson River Ventures in 2011 to address the growing issue of access to capital for small businesses in the Hudson Valley. He also founded the Hudson Valley Advanced Manufacturing Center at SUNY New Paltz in 2013, which trains students and workers on the use of 3-D printing technology.

Since 2011, Eldridge has served on the board of directors of Scenic Hudson, "the largest environmental group focused on the Hudson Valley", and is a significant supporter of their climate change and waterfront protection programs. Eldridge has also served as a Planned Parenthood board member.

In 2012, Eldridge launched Protect Our Democracy PAC and New York Leadership for Accountable Government (NY LEAD), a bipartisan group of business and civic leaders advocating for campaign finance reform in New York State.

=== 2014 congressional campaign ===
Eldridge and his husband, Chris Hughes, bought a home in Garrison, New York for $5 million in 2011 so that Eldridge could run for Congress in New York's 18th congressional district. After another Democrat was elected to Congress in that district, Eldridge and Hughes purchased a $2 million home in New York's 19th congressional district in 2013.

After moving into the 19th congressional district, “Eldridge set up a venture capital firm, Hudson River Ventures, that has provided millions in loans and equity lines to local companies.” Eldridge reportedly used Hughes's wealth “to build an elaborate campaign apparatus in a district where he remain[ed] a stranger to many. In addition to his firm’s investments, Eldridge…promised to match each contribution he receive[d], dollar for dollar.”

In early 2013, Eldridge, then aged 26, filed paperwork to run for the U.S. House of Representatives in 2014. A Democrat, Eldridge challenged Republican incumbent Chris Gibson in New York's 19th congressional district. The district has been described as "the quintessential swing district". RealClearPolitics.com reported that "Eldridge's formidable strengths as a well-financed, eloquent messenger with powerful friends in the Democratic Party [were] obvious" and praised Eldridge for making campaign finance reform "a key part of his platform". Eldridge supported abortion rights and immigration reform, opposed hydrofracking, and supported a minimum wage hike. Because Eldridge and Hughes had only moved into the district fairly recently, Eldridge developed a reputation as a carpetbagger. In October 2014, The New York Times described Eldridge as "'a first-time Democratic candidate with a thin résumé and a thick wallet'", and Politico called his campaign a "catastrophe". Vanity Fair opined that his campaign was "overfunded and stacked with expensive consultants".

On November 4, 2014, Eldridge lost the election, 62.6%-34.5%, "despite having outspent his opponent nearly 3-to-1 in a district President Obama won by 6 percentage points".

=== Stand Up America ===
In the weeks after the 2016 election, Eldridge started Stand Up America, an advocacy organization that began as a Facebook page and quickly grew to a community of over two million progressives. The organization has fought to impeach Donald Trump, secure funding for election security, and pass voting rights laws and anti-corruption legislation.

== Personal life ==
Eldridge became a U.S. citizen in 2006.

Eldridge married Facebook co-founder Chris Hughes on June 30, 2012. They have one son. Eldridge and Hughes attended President Barack Obama's first state dinner together in 2009. The couple was featured on the cover of The Advocate magazine's "Forty Under 40" issue in 2011. Eldridge and Hughes were also profiled in The New York Times in May 2012.

== Electoral history ==
US House election, 2014: New York District 19
Party	Candidate	Votes	%
Democratic	Sean S. Eldridge	60,533	28.8%
Working Families	Sean S. Eldridge	11,937	5.7%
Total	Sean S. Eldridge	72,470	34.5%
Republican	Chris Gibson	102,118	48.5%
Conservative	Chris Gibson	20,420	9.7%
Independence	Chris Gibson	9,056	4.3%
Total	Chris Gibson (Incumbent)	131,594	62.6%
None	Blank/Void/Write-In	6,287	2.9%
Total votes		210,351	100%
