= Talia Stroud =

Communications researcher

Natalie (Talia) Jomini Stroud is the E. M. Dealey professor at the University of Texas at Austin. She is known for her work examining the intersection between media and democracy.

== Education and career ==
She received her B.A. in mass communication and statistics from the University of California, Berkeley and he Ph.D from the Annenberg School for Communication at the University of Pennsylvania. As of 2022 she is the E. M. “Ted” Dealey professor in the Department of Communication Studies and the School of Journalism at the University of Texas at Austin.

In 2012, her book Niche News: The Politics of News Choice won the International Communication Association Outstanding Book Award.

In 2021 she was named a Fellow of the International Communication Association, and is a fellow of the Annenberg Public Policy Center.

She has worked with Eli Pariser on projects including Civic Signals and New Public, and spoken about how trust in the media aligns with political interests.

== Selected publications ==
- Stroud, Natalie Jomini (2011). Niche news : the politics of news choice. New York: Oxford University Press. ISBN 978-0-19-975550-9. OCLC 611551570.
- Stroud, Natalie Jomini (August 19, 2010). "Polarization and Partisan Selective Exposure". Journal of Communication. 60 (3): 556–576. doi:10.1111/j.1460-2466.2010.01497.x.
- Stroud, Natalie Jomini (2008). "Media Use and Political Predispositions: Revisiting the Concept of Selective Exposure". Political Behavior. 30 (3): 341–366. doi:10.1007/s11109-007-9050-9. ISSN 0190-9320. S2CID 44007990.
- Kenski, Kate; Stroud, Natalie Jomini (June 1, 2006). "Connections Between Internet Use and Political Efficacy, Knowledge, and Participation". Journal of Broadcasting & Electronic Media. 50 (2): 173–192. doi:10.1207/s15506878jobem5002_1. ISSN 0883-8151. S2CID 31634269.
