= Guy Vidra =

American businessman

Guy Vidra is currently a partner at Collaborative Fund, a venture capital firm. Previously, he was the head of revenue for XO Group. For 19 months, from October 2014 to April 2016, he was chief executive officer of The New Republic. Before that, he was the general manager and head of strategy and development at Yahoo! News.

== Education ==
Vidra holds a BA in political science from University of Michigan and a master's in international relations from Fletcher School of Law and Diplomacy at Tufts University.

== Career ==
He was the general manager and head of strategy and development at Yahoo! News. He was the head of revenue for XO Group.

=== New Republic CEO ===
For 19 months, from October 2014 to April 2016, he was Chief Executive Officer of The New Republic.

Vidra was appointed as CEO of The New Republic by the magazine's owner, Chris Hughes, a co-founder of Facebook. Vidra's appointment to The New Republic in October 2014 was soon followed by the resignation of editor Franklin Foer. Foer's replacement was Gabriel Snyder, previously of Gawker. In December 2014, Vidra and Hughes announced that the magazine—founded in the living room of Theodore Roosevelt—was to be reinvented as a vertically integrated digital-media company. Jonathan Chait described the announcement as follows:

Vidra communicated the new vision to the staff in what I am told was an uncomfortable stream of business clichés ungrounded in any apparent strategy other than saying things like "let's break shit" and "we're a tech company now." His memo to the staff predictably uses terms like "straddle generation" and "brand." It promises to make TNR "a vertically integrated digital media company," possibly unaware that "vertically integrated" is an actual business concept, not a term for a media company that integrates verticals.

The changes provoked tumult within the publication. The magazine's literary editor, Leon Wieseltier; executive editors Rachel Morris and Greg Veis; nine of the magazine’s eleven active senior writers; the legal-affairs editor; the digital-media editor; six culture writers and editors and thirty-six out of thirty-eight contributing editors resigned or asked to have their names removed from the magazine's masthead. In all, two-thirds of the names on the editorial masthead were removed. Vidra resigned from his position at The New Republic in April 2016.
