= Peter Koechley =

American writer and internet entrepreneur

- Born: Peter Lennon Koechley; Madison, Wisconsin
- Education: Columbia University (BA)
- Occupations: Entrepreneur, writer, editor
- Known for: Co-founder of Upworthy and managing editor of The Onion

Peter Lennon Koechley is an American writer and internet entrepreneur. He was the managing editor of The Onion and co-founded Upworthy.

== Biography ==
Koechley attended Madison West High School and graduated from Columbia University in 2003 with a double major in philosophy and creative writing. In 2005, he was profiled by Ezra Klein as the youngest staff writer for The Onion on Generation Progress.

His association with The Onion began when he published his first article on the site at age 17 as a high school student in Madison, Wisconsin. He also published a satirical newspaper on campus and sent articles to The Onion, eventually attracting the latter's attention. Later, he began to work at the office of the publication and landed an internship during his senior year in high school as the site's first intern. At Columbia, he also freelanced for the publication, publishing a total of 25 articles for which he received a payment of $20. He was hired out of college and became manager editor of the website at age 24. At The Onion, Koechley was responsible for creating the Onion News Network and gravitated towards tech content.

Koechley joined MoveOn in 2009 to produce viral media content for the nonprofit group. There he met Eli Pariser and the two began to develop a concept for a platform that generates viral content devoted to significant social issues, what they call "social media with a mission". Their business plan appealed to Chris Hughes, who provided them with $500,000 in seed capital. They also attracted seed capital from BuzzFeed co-founder John Seward Johnson III and Reddit co-founder Alexis Ohanian.

In 2012, Koechley and Pariser launched Upworthy. By the end of October 2012, it has attracted 8.7 million users, leading Business Insider to name it the fastest growing media company in the world.

In 2015, he apologized for Upworthy's out-sized success and pledged to change the algorithm, saying: "We sort of unleashed a monster. Sorry for that. Sorry we kind of broke the internet last year. I'm excited going forward to say goodbye to clickbait."

In 2017, Koechley announced his departure from Upworthy. He has been working with Compass, Inc. founder Robert Reffkin, in writing the book No One Succeeds Alone: Learn Everything You Can from Everyone You Can, published in 2021.

In 2021, Koechley joined The Our City PAC, a progressive political action committee supporting left-leaning mayoral and New York City Council candidates.

== Personal life ==
Koechley was born to Barbara E. Koechley and Robert H. Koechley in Madison, Wisconsin. His father is an executive with Promega Corporation and his mother is a teacher for the McFarland School District in McFarland, Wisconsin. In 2009, Koechley married Kristina Williams, also a Madison native. The couple lives in Brooklyn.
