= Bush in 30 Seconds =

Defunct website

Bushin30seconds.org was a liberal website sponsored by MoveOn.org voter fund. The website showcases the results of a political advertising contest that was open to the public in November 2003, in which the goal was to criticize key points about George W. Bush and his policies in just 30 seconds of airtime.

The Bush in 30 Seconds ad contest was created by MoveOn.org Executive Director Eli Pariser, MoveOn.org Cultural Director Laura Dawn, Lee Solomon, and multi-platinum selling pop star Moby.

Ads were judged in different categories, such as funniest ad, best animated ad, best youth ad, overall best ad, and overall best ad runner-up. In the end, there were 6 winners and 26 finalists. In the branch-off categories, the public picked winners from four choices. Two entries stirred controversy by comparing Bush to Nazi Germany and were rejected by MoveOn after they received complaints.

The overall winning ad was "Child's Pay," by Charlie Fisher, 38, of Denver, directed and shot by Per Dreyer. Charlie Fisher is an advertising executive who was a registered Republican until the end of the first Bush administration, in 1992. It features young children working jobs – washing dishes, hauling trash, repairing tires, cleaning offices, assembly-line processing and grocery checking – followed by the line: "Guess who’s going to pay off President Bush’s $1 trillion deficit?"

The ads were judged by a panel of celebrity judges, consisting of Jack Black, Benny Boom, Donna Brazile, James Carville, Margaret Cho, Hector Elizondo, Al Franken, Janeane Garofalo, Stan Greenberg, Ted Hope, Michael Mann, Moby, Michael Moore, Mark Pellington, Tony Shalhoub, Russell Simmons, Michael Stipe, Gus Van Sant, Katrina vanden Heuvel, Jessica Lange, and Eddie Vedder.

Along with the finalists, the top 150 ads are now available online, ranging from the serious to the absurd.

All of the works are created under the Creative Commons BY-NC-ND license.

The winning ad was to be aired on CBS during the Super Bowl half-time. However, CBS refused to air the ad, and it was aired on CNN instead.
