= Eli Pariser =

Author, activist, and entrepreneur

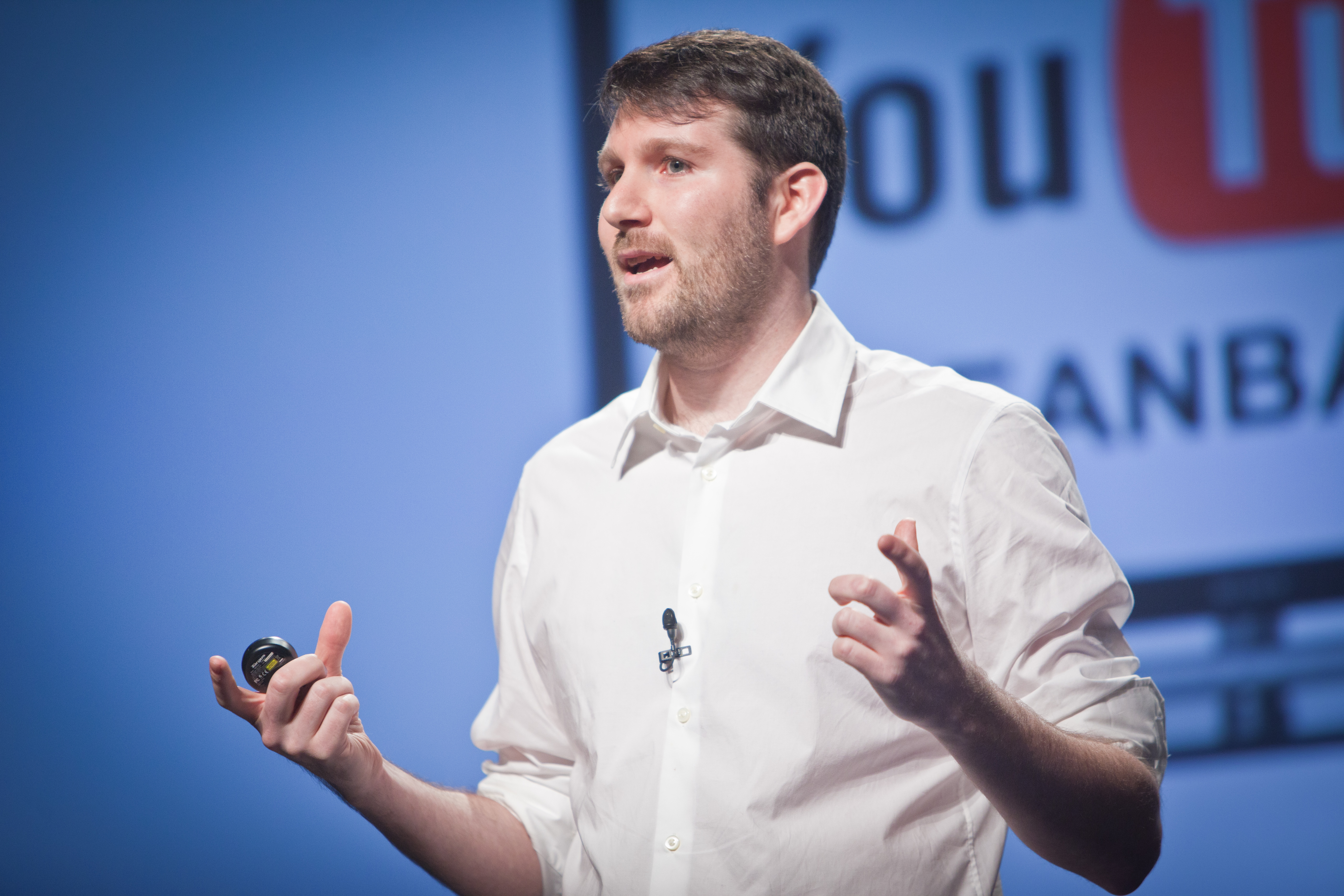
- Pariser at the PopTech 2010 conference in Camden, Maine
- Born: December 17, 1980 (age 45); Lincolnville, Maine, U.S.
- Education: Bard College at Simon's Rock
- Occupations: Activist and author
- Known for: New_ Public MoveOn.org; Upworthy; The Filter Bubble
- Spouse: Gena Konstantinakos

Eli Pariser (born December 17, 1980) is an author, activist, and entrepreneur. He has stated that his focus is "how to make technology and media serve democracy". He became executive director of MoveOn.org in 2004, where he helped pioneer the practice of online citizen engagement. He is the co-founder of Upworthy, a website for meaningful viral content, and Avaaz, a global citizen's organization. His bestselling book, The Filter Bubble: What the Internet Is Hiding from You, introduced the term “filter bubble” to the lexicon. He is currently an Omidyar Fellow at New America and co-directs New_ Public.

== Early life ==
Pariser was born to Dora Lievow of Camden, Maine and Emanuel Pariser of Waterville, Maine. He grew up in Lincolnville, Maine, and in 2000 graduated summa cum laude from Bard College at Simon's Rock with a B.A. in law and political science. In 2005, he returned to Simon's Rock to give the commencement speech. He is Jewish.

== Career ==
Pariser's rise to prominence as a political activist began when he and college student David H. Pickering launched an online petition calling for a nonmilitary response to the attacks of September 11. At the time, he was working as a program assistant for the national nonprofit More Than Money. In less than a month, half a million people had signed the petition.

Pariser joined Moveon.org in November 2001, when founders Wes Boyd and Joan Blades invited him to merge his efforts with theirs. During the 2004 U.S. presidential campaign, Pariser co-created the Bush in 30 Seconds ad contest and raised over $30 million from small donors to run ads and back Democratic and progressive candidates. Writing for The New York Times Magazine in 2003, journalist George Packer referred to MoveOn as the "mainstream" element of what "may be the fastest-growing protest movement in American history." Pariser was the Executive Director of MoveOn.org from 2004 to 2008 and since 2008 has been Board President.

Pariser later became concerned about the development of web personalization. He noticed a pattern of differing responses to search engine queries based on a user's past Internet search history, such that a person with a liberal orientation might get an entirely different set of responses than a conservative if he or she used Google, Facebook, or Yahoo to search for a phrase or term on the Internet. For example, a liberal typing "BP" might get information about the oil spill in the Gulf of Mexico, while a conservative typing "BP" might get investment information about the oil company.

Anticipating the dangers of a hyper-personalized Internet, Pariser introduced the term “filter bubble” to the lexicon in his 2011 New York Times bestselling book, The Filter Bubble: What the Internet Is Hiding from You. Bill Gates, Sir Tim Berners-Lee, and other internet pioneers have since expressed concern about the phenomenon, and his 2011 TED talk on the topic now has over five million views. In 2012, he co-founded Upworthy, a media company designed to make civically important ideas popular, with Peter Koechley. Within two years, Upworthy had over 80 million monthly visitors.

In 2018, with Professor Talia Stroud, he began work on Civic Signals, with the goal of creating more “public-friendly” online spaces, a concept described in his 2019 Ted Talk. Civic Signals, a project of the National Conference on Citizenship, became New_ Public in 2021. He is currently an affiliate of the Safra Center for Ethics at Harvard University, a Langfield Visiting Resident at Princeton University, and an Omidyar Fellow at the New America. He is also one of the 25 leading figures on the Information and Democracy Commission launched by Reporters Without Borders.

== Works ==
- Eli Pariser, The Filter Bubble: What the Internet Is Hiding from You, Penguin Press (New York, May 2011) ISBN 978-1-59420-300-8
