= Strong Economy for All Coalition =

The Strong Economy for All Coalition is a coalition of labor unions and community groups in New York State. According to their press materials, the coalition was formed in March 2011 to advocate for private and public policies that will benefit working New Yorkers. Since their formation, they have mainly been involved in pressing for the Millionaire's Tax to be retained in the 2011 state budget.

Coalition members include: 1199 SEIU United Healthcare Workers East, Coalition for the Homeless, United Federation of Teachers (UFT), Citizen Action, Alliance for Quality Education, New York State AFL-CIO, New York Communities for Change, 32BJ SEIU, New York City Central Labor Council, New York State United Teachers (NYSUT), Make the Road New York, Communication Workers of America (CWA), and the Municipal Labor Committee.
