= Senior living =

Housing and lifestyle concept related to the elderly

Senior living is a concept that encompasses a range of housing and lifestyle options for ageing persons adapted to the interests and challenges of health issues associated with ageing, such as limited mobility and susceptibility to illness.

== Common forms ==
Based on the health and financial means of the individual, these may include living in a retirement community or an age-restricted community, independent senior living, or living in a nursing home or retirement home.

A retirement community is a residential community or housing complex designed for older adults who are generally able to care for themselves; however, assistance from home care agencies is allowed in some communities, and activities and socialization opportunities are often provided. Some of the characteristics typically are: the community must be age-restricted or age-qualified, residents must be partially or fully retired, and the community offers shared services or amenities.

An age-restricted community is a residential community, often gated, that typically limits 80% of the residency to individuals who are over a set age. The minimum age is frequently set at 55 years old, but it can vary. These communities are set up to accommodate older individuals who would like to live in an area without the perceived problems of having children around. In most cases a younger spouse or significant other is permitted to live in the community as long as one member meets the minimum age requirement.

Age-qualified communities, also known as 55+ communities, active adult communities, lifestyle communities, or retirement communities, are often planned communities that offer homes and community features that are attractive to 55+ adults. These might include a clubhouse or lifestyle center with a good many activities, sometimes with indoor and outdoor swimming pools, exercise facilities, craft rooms, demonstration kitchens, and decks and patios for gathering.

Independent senior living communities commonly provide apartments in USA, but some also offer cottages, condominiums, and single-family homes. Residents include seniors who do not require assistance with daily activities or 24/7 skilled nursing, but may benefit from convenient services, senior-friendly surroundings, and increased social opportunities that independent senior living communities offer.

Independent senior living properties do not provide health care or assistance with activities of daily living (ADLs) such as medication, bathing, eating, dressing, toileting and more. Independent senior living differs from continuing care communities, which offer independent living along with multiple other levels of care, such as assisted living and skilled nursing, in one single residence. Rather, independent living communities commonly provide services known as instrumental activities of daily living (IADLs).

A retirement home is a multi-residence housing facility intended for the elderly. The concept is sometimes called an old people's home, old folks' home, or old age home, although old people's home can also refer to a nursing home. Typically, each person or couple in the home has an apartment-style room or suite of rooms. Additional facilities are provided within the building. This can include facilities for meals, gatherings, recreation activities, and some form of health or hospice care. A place in a retirement home can be paid for on a rental basis, like an apartment, or can be bought in perpetuity on the same basis as a condominium.
