= Chris Hughes =

American entrepreneur

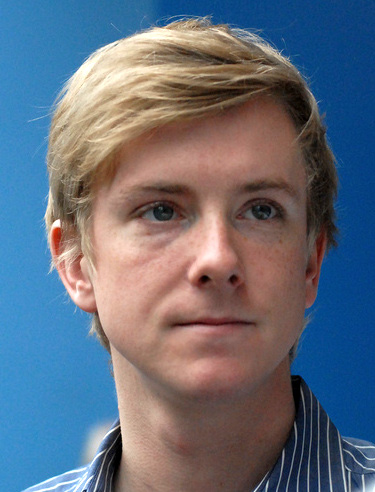
- Hughes in 2009
- Born: Christopher Hughes; November 26, 1983 (age 42); Hickory, North Carolina, U.S.
- Education: Harvard University (BA); The New School (MA); University of Pennsylvania (attended)
- Known for: Co-founder of Facebook
- Political party: Democratic
- Spouse: Sean Eldridge (m. 2012)
- Children: 2

Christopher Hughes (born November 26, 1983) is an American entrepreneur and author who co-founded and served as spokesman for the online social directory and networking site Facebook until 2007. He was the publisher and editor-in-chief of The New Republic from 2012 to 2016.

Hughes co-founded the Economic Security Project (ESP) in 2016. In 2018, he published Fair Shot: Rethinking Inequality and How We Earn and in 2025 he published Marketcrafters: The 100-year Struggle to Shape the American Economy.

== Early life ==
Hughes grew up in Hickory, North Carolina, as the only child of Arlen "Ray" Hughes, an industrial paper salesman, and Brenda Hughes, a mathematics teacher. He was raised as an evangelical Lutheran but later rejected the faith. He graduated from Phillips Academy in Andover, Massachusetts, before earning a Bachelor of Arts in History and English Literature, magna cum laude, from Harvard College.

In February 2020, it was reported that Hughes was in the process of earning his Master of Arts in economics from The New School. He has since begun a Doctor of Philosophy in business ethics and legal studies at the University of Pennsylvania.

== Career ==
=== Facebook ===
Hughes is a co-founder of Facebook. At Harvard, Hughes met and was recruited by Mark Zuckerberg, who was still working in the early stages of the website. During their summer break in 2004, Hughes and Zuckerberg traveled to Palo Alto, California. While Zuckerberg decided to remain in Palo Alto after the break, Hughes returned to Harvard to continue his studies. In 2006, after graduating from Harvard, Hughes relocated to Palo Alto to rejoin Zuckerberg and became involved in Facebook again.

Hughes was unofficially responsible for beta testing and product suggestions. When the group had the idea to open Facebook to other schools, Hughes argued that schools should have their networks to maintain intimacy. He was also a key driver in developing many of Facebook's popular features, which led to the opening of Facebook to the outside world.

Hughes left Facebook in 2007.

When Facebook's initial public offering took place in 2012, Hughes made $500 million.

=== After Facebook ===
In March 2009, Hughes was named Entrepreneur in Residence at General Catalyst, a Cambridge, Massachusetts, venture-capital firm.

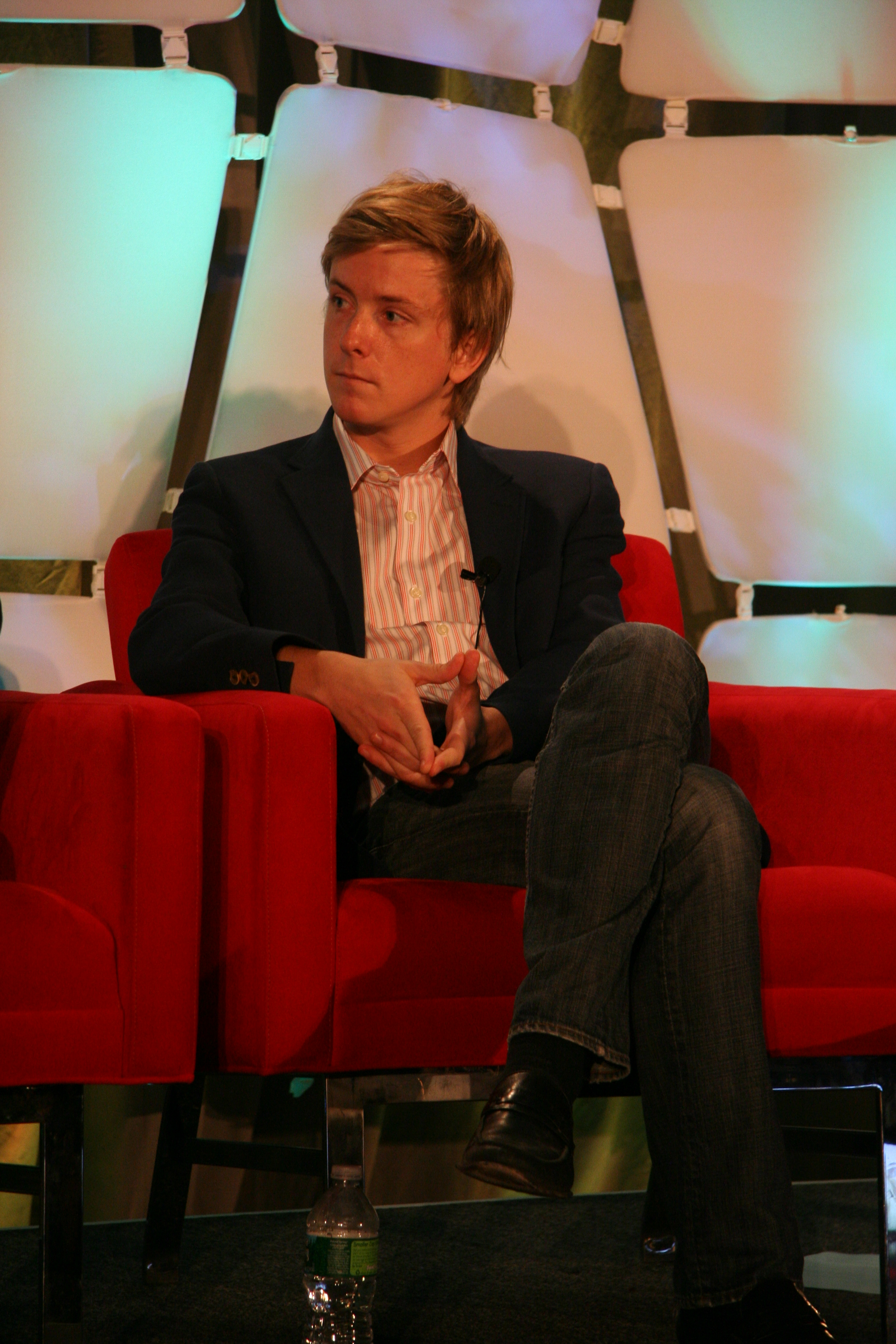
Hughes at TechCrunch Disrupt in 2010

Hughes was the executive director of Jumo, a non-profit social network organization he founded in 2010, which "aims to help people find ways to help the world". In July 2010, UNAIDS (Joint United Nations Programme on HIV/AIDS) appointed him to a 17-member "High Level Commission" of renowned politicians, business leaders, human rights activists, and scientists tasked with spearheading a "social and political action campaign over the coming year aimed at galvanizing support for effective HIV prevention programmes."

=== The New Republic ===
In March 2012, Hughes purchased a majority stake in The New Republic magazine. He became the publisher and executive chairman and also served as editor-in-chief of the magazine. In December 2014, shortly after the magazine's centennial celebration, editor Franklin Foer and literary editor Leon Wieseltier were "driven out," and dozens of other staff and contributing editors resigned after a new chief executive, Guy Vidra, a former Yahoo! employee, described the new direction of the magazine as a "vertically integrated digital media company." The magazine was forced to cancel its upcoming issue due to the staff departures.

The magazine was not profitable during Hughes' tenure. On January 11, 2016, Hughes put The New Republic up for sale, saying he had "underestimated the difficulty of transitioning an old and traditional institution into a digital media company in today's quickly evolving climate." Hughes' ownership of The New Republic was described by The New York Times as a "vanity project." He sold the magazine on February 26, 2016, to Oregon publisher Win McCormack.

=== Other activities ===
Hughes co-founded the Economic Security Project in 2016. In 2018, he published Fair Shot: Rethinking Inequality and How We Earn. In 2025, he published Marketcrafters: The 100-Year Struggle to Shape the American Economy.

In May 2019, he published an op-ed in the New York Times, calling for the break-up of Facebook and government regulation of content on it; in June of the same year, he criticized the Facebook decision to launch Libra (which was later renamed Diem), saying that the cryptocurrency "would shift power into the wrong hands if, at least, the coin be modestly successful". He is completing his PhD in business ethics at the Wharton School of Economics at the University of Pennsylvania. He publishes his thoughts and political commentary on his Substack.

== Political involvement ==
After leaving Facebook, Hughes volunteered for Barack Obama's 2008 presidential campaign.

Hughes and Sean Eldridge bought a $2 million residence in New York's 19th congressional district with the reported purpose of permitting Eldridge to run for the congressional seat there. In 2014, Eldridge lost his congressional bid by 29 points.

Hughes endorsed Democratic candidate Hillary Clinton in the run-up for the 2016 U.S. presidential election.

== Personal life ==
Hughes is gay and is married to Sean Eldridge. Hughes and Eldridge announced their engagement in January 2011 at a reception supporting Freedom to Marry. They married on June 30, 2012. They have two children and reside in Manhattan.

== In popular culture ==
Hughes was portrayed by actor Patrick Mapel in the 2010 film The Social Network.
