= Stand Up America =

American non-profit organization

- Formation: 2016; 10 years ago
- Founders: Sean Eldridge
- Type: 501(c)(4)
- Purpose: Voting rights and democracy reform
- Location: New York, New York
- Website: standupamerica.com

Stand Up America is a 501(c)(4) non-profit organization based in New York City focused on using grassroots advocacy to stand up to corruption and voter suppression and build a more representative democracy. The organization was founded by Sean Eldridge in the weeks after the 2016 U.S. presidential election.

== History and organization ==
Stand Up America was founded after the 2016 election to provide progressives a platform to take action to oppose Donald Trump's agenda. Within weeks of launching, the community quickly grew to over one million members, and has since grown to include over two million progressives from every congressional district in the country.

== Federal advocacy ==
=== Election security funding ===
In response to Russia's attack on the 2016 presidential election, Stand Up America launched a campaign in August 2019 pressuring Congress to approve election security funding to help states to update outdated voting machines. The group reports that their members made more than 120,000 calls to the Senate demanding the funding, leading to a bipartisan group of lawmakers allocating $425 million in funding in the 2020 appropriations bill.

In March 2020, the group shifted focus to support efforts in Congress to provide states with election assistance funding amid the COVID-19 pandemic to protect Americans' right to vote. The group helped secure $400 million in federal funds for mail-in voting and expanded early voting in states.

=== Donald Trump impeachment ===
In May 2019, after the release of the Mueller Report, Stand Up launched a nationwide campaign seeking to pressure Congress to immediately begin a formal impeachment inquiry into Donald Trump. The campaign, which relied heavily on digital organizing tactics, drove 360,000 constituent calls to Congress and included organizing in-district actions during what the group called ‘Impeachment August.’

The group also helped mobilize hundreds of thousands of Americans at the "Nobody Is Above The Law" rallies the eve before Trump was impeached by the House of Representatives. As Trump's impeachment trial unfolded in the Senate, Stand Up continued to work with a bipartisan coalition to pressure Republican senators to convict Trump, and joined Public Citizen, Common Cause, and others in planning over 300 "Reject The Cover-Up" rallies to protest Trump's acquittal.

=== Trump's tax returns ===
The group helped organize the national Tax March on April 15, 2017, which called for the release of Trump's tax returns. Since 2017, Stand Up America has been one of the leading groups pushing federal lawmakers to obtain and release Trump's tax returns. In 2019, Stand Up also led a coalition of activists and advocates in New York seeking to pass legislation that would provide Congress the ability to request Trump's state income taxes.

=== The Freedom to Vote: John R. Lewis Act ===
In response to GOP state legislators’ efforts to restrict voting rights after record voter turnout in 2020, Stand Up America began organizing for the passage of the Freedom to Vote Act (previously known as For the People Act) and the John R. Lewis Voting Rights Advancement Act. In 2021, Stand Up America's community drove nearly 200,000 constituent calls and emails to the Senate, demanding that senators end the filibuster and pass the Freedom to Vote Act and the John Lewis Voting Rights Advancement Act.

=== Ending the filibuster ===
Stand Up America has advocated to end the Senate filibuster, as it has been used to stall or defeat voting rights legislation. In 2021, Stand Up America, in coalition with national progressive groups and the family of the late John Lewis, delivered a petition with more than 400,000 signatures to the White House calling on President Biden to use the power of his office to publicly urge the Senate to end the filibuster and pass critical voting rights legislation.

=== Judiciary Act of 2021 ===
In 2021, the group announced their support for the Judiciary Act, which would expand the Supreme Court from nine seats to thirteen. Stand Up America, as part of the Unrig the Courts coalition, sent a letter to the Congressional Progressive Caucus urging them to support the Judiciary Act.

== State-based advocacy ==
In 2020, Stand Up America began organizing in Colorado in support of Proposition 113 and the National Popular Vote Interstate Compact, a nationwide effort to ensure that the presidential candidate who receives the most votes in the nation as a whole becomes president. Colorado voters passed the ballot measure by a 52-to-48 margin.

Stand Up America has expanded its grassroots organizing efforts to the state and local level. The group is engaged in voting rights advocacy across the country, including in New Jersey, New York, Illinois, and Arizona.

== Supporting progressive candidates ==
During the 2020 presidential election, Stand Up reached more than 25 million Americans to help get out the vote in a dozen presidential and Senate battleground states, registering 100,000 voters and helping 100,000 others vote by mail or find their polling place.
