= Providence Anime Conference =

Anime convention in Providence, Rhode Island, United States

Coordinates: 41°49′28.4″N 71°24′57.6″W

- Status: Defunct
- Venue: Rhode Island Convention Center
- Location: Providence, Rhode Island
- Country: United States
- Inaugurated: 2008
- Most recent: 2008
- Attendance: 375 in 2008
- Organizer: New England Anime Society

Providence Anime Conference (PAC) was a three-day anime convention held in Providence, Rhode Island. It was the first 21-and-older anime convention. PAC was created by the New England Anime Society, a Massachusetts-based nonprofit organization also responsible for creating Anime Boston.

== History ==
Providence Anime Conference was announced at Anime Boston 2007 with a 21-and-older age requirement and programing geared towards mature fans. The convention estimated that attendance would be in the thousands for the first year, and instituted a 2000-attendee cap, but only registered 211 paid attendees. Problems with the convention included a remote convention location, an expensive convention center with limited public transportation, the 21-and-older age requirement, and no one-day passes. At times, the convention's halls were empty due to heavy panel attendance and the dealers suffered due to the frugality of the attendees. Positives included cash bars selling alcoholic beverages, the use of adult language, and full panel rooms with good Q&A's and discussions. The low attendance caused the convention to lose money and not return for the immediate future. Even with those problems, the convention was felt by many to be a good experience.

At Anime Boston 2018, a panel titled "Providence Anime Conference: 10 Years Later" was presented. During this panel, several former members of PAC staff told the tale of how the convention came to exist, what went wrong, and the legacy it left behind.

=== Event history ===
Dates	Location	Attend.	Guests
October 3–5, 2008	Rhode Island Convention Center; Providence, Rhode Island	211 (paid); 375 (estimated total)	Christopher Ayres, Kevin McKeever, Adam Sheehan, Tom Wayland, and David L. Williams.

== See also ==
- Anime Boston
- New England Anime Society
- Sangawa Project
- List of anime conventions
