= Razzle =

Razzle may refer to:

- Razzle (game), a carnival game
- Razzle (magazine), a British soft porn magazine
- Razzle (musician) (1960–1984), former drummer of Hanoi Rocks
- Razzle (Band), the precursor to the band Lit
- Razzle, the fictional dog in the BBC children's television series Jonny Briggs
- Razzles, a type of candy
- The codename of Microsoft's Windows NT 3.1 operating aystem

== See also ==
- Razzle Dazzle (disambiguation)
