= RICC =

RICC may refer to:

- Rhode Island Comic Con
- Rhode Island Convention Center
- Rhode Island Country Club
- Rhode Island Children's Chorus
