= Rhode Island Comic Con =

Three-day comic convention in Rhode Island, USA

Coordinates: 41°49′27″N 71°25′1″W

- Status: Active
- Genre: Comics
- Venue: Rhode Island Convention Center; Amica Mutual Pavilion; Omni Providence Hotel
- Location: Providence, Rhode Island
- Country: United States
- Inaugurated: 2012
- Attendance: 81,000 in 2016
- Organizer: Altered Reality Entertainment LLC
- Website: www.ricomiccon.com

Rhode Island Comic Con (RICC) is a three-day comic convention held during November at the Rhode Island Convention Center, Amica Mutual Pavilion, and Omni Providence Hotel in Providence, Rhode Island. The convention was Rhode Island's first Comic Con. Organizers also run the Colorado Springs Comic Con, Contropolis branded conventions, Rhode Island Anime Con, South Coast Toy and Comic Show, and Terror Con.

== Programming ==
The convention typically offers artists, celebrity guests, cars, comic book authors, a costume contest, gaming, kids-con, professional wrestlers, vendors, video game tournaments, and voice artists. In 2013, the convention also hosted several wedding ceremonies. The 2018 event brought an estimated $4.2 million to the area's economy.

== History ==
Rhode Island Comic Con held its first event in 2012 at the Rhode Island Convention Center and took two years to prepare. David Anders, Anthony Michael Hall, Madison Lintz, Jett Lucas, Nichelle Nichols, Chanel Ryan, and Raphael Sbarge could not make it to the 2013 convention due to the 2013 Los Angeles International Airport shooting. A Halloween party was held on Friday before the convention in 2014. The fire marshal shutdown RICC temporarily on Saturday due to over capacity caused by poor attendance flow. Rhode Island Convention Center has a maximum occupancy of 17,000 and attendance at the time of shutdown was over 20,000. It was the first time in Rhode Island Convention Center history a shutdown due to over capacity occurred. An estimated 1,500 or more attendees were unable to enter the convention. Many were attendees who left the convention but could not re-enter. The attendees in line suffered from poor weather conditions and chants for refunds began. Attendees were later allowed to enter in small groups (100 people) or could exchange tickets for Sunday. Refunds were later issued for attendees who purchased tickets but could not enter the convention. Crowding was also caused by the convention's 50 percent growth, not using all available space, and the convention center not being prepared for attendees to stay so long. Sunday did not experience the same levels of crowding and ticket sales were capped.

Prior to the 2015, RICC changed its press policy due to concerns that it limited negative free speech about the event. The convention made several changes to prevent overcrowding issues in 2015. The changes included expanding to the Dunkin' Donuts Center, increasing to three days, ticket scanning to accurately know attendance figures, a 17,000 ticket sales cap per day, and increased vendor food supply. Carrie Fisher cancelled her 2015 appearance due to illness. Jorge Elorza, the mayor of Providence, participated in the Comic Con's opening ceremony. Saturday's ticket sales for Rhode Island Comic Con stopped at 10:30 a.m. The convention in 2015 had over 500 volunteers. Before 2016's convention, Kate Beckinsale canceled her appearance due to work commitments. Friday and Saturday tickets sold out for the 2016 convention. "Rhode Warrior", the conventions comic book, launched at the 2016 event. Due to issues with photo ops after 2016, a different company was used in 2017, and RICC added ballroom space (Narragansett Ballrooms) in the Omni Providence Hotel. Additional line space was added in a large tent behind the Dunkin' Donuts Center.

Several major guests cancelled before the 2017 convention, including Jon Bernthal, Richard Dreyfuss, Lennie James, Tom Payne, Khary Payton, Norman Reedus, and Mark Ruffalo. Several Walking Dead guests had to cancel their appearance due to shooting delays on the season finale. The convention's ticket sales were limited to 17,000 per day, with Saturday being sold out. RICC also added the Geekfest film festival and a Gene Simmons concert at the Veterans Memorial Auditorium. The convention used the Omni Providence Hotel for almost all panel content in 2018. An additional entrance was also added to the convention to reduce wait times. Rhode Island Comic Con 2020 and Rhode Island Comic Con Summer Edition 2021 were cancelled due to the COVID-19 pandemic. The 2021 convention had mask requirements, but enforcement was poor. During 2022's convention, two panels hosted in the Omni required a separate ticket. A dealer was arrested during the convention for running a scam gambling game from his table. Jeffrey Jones was removed from the guest list prior to the 2023 convention due to past criminal charges. The 2023 SAG-AFTRA strike did not affect the conventions ability to book guests, but guests could not answer certain questions due to the strike.

=== Event history ===
Dates	Location	Attend.	Guests
November 3–4, 2012	Rhode Island Convention Center; Providence, Rhode Island	15,000 (est) or 16,000	Nicholas Brendon, John de Lancie, Quinton Flynn, Jason David Frank, Gil Gerard, Dan Gilvezan, Mark Goddard, Richard Hatch, Walter E. Jones, Tom Kane, Peter Mayhew, David Orange, Robert Picardo, Claudia Wells, Billy West, David Yost, Jim Duggan, Lee Meriwether, Ian Robb, Jake Roberts, Dirk Benedict, and Walter Simonson.
November 2–3, 2013	Rhode Island Convention Center; Providence, Rhode Island	17,000	Robert Axelrod, Nicholas Brendon, Nakia Burrise, Nicki Clyne, Jason David Frank, Gil Gerard, Barbara Goodson, Yaya Han, Alan Harris, Richard Hatch, Ernie Hudson, Walter E. Jones, Larry Kenney, Riki "Riddle" LeCotey, Jason Narvy, Jessica Nigri, Ethan Phillips, Robert Picardo, Paul Schrier, Dana Snyder, Catherine Sutherland, Burt Ward, Adam West, Billy Dee Williams, David Yost, Billy Zabka, Joe Chin, Danny Glover, Howard Finkel, Simon Fisher-Becker, Gremlina, C. Thomas Howell, Keith Johnson, Terry Kiser, Marty Kove, Andrew McCarthy, Kevin Nash, Julie Newmar, Marky Ramone, James Tolkan, Rikishi, Jonathan Silverman, Catherine Mary Stewart, Larry Storch, Claudia Wells, Rusty Gilligan, Richard Hatch, Tawny Kitaen, John Amos, Yvonne Craig, and Jimmie Walker
November 1–2, 2014	Rhode Island Convention Center; Providence, Rhode Island	30,000 (est) or 47,000 (est)	Neal Adams, Karan Ashley, Colin Baker, Michael Biehn, Eliza Dushku, Gigi Edgley, David J. Fielding, Seth Gilliam, Anthony Michael Hall, Richard Horvitz, Walter Koenig, Peter Mayhew, Eddie McClintock, Vic Mignogna, Samantha Newark, Nichelle Nichols, Destiny Nickelsen, Ray Park, John Rhys-Davies, Saul Rubinek, William Shatner, Mark Sheppard, Orli Shoshan, Rikki Simons, Austin St. John, George Takei, Veronica Taylor, Scott Wilson, John Coppinger, Michael Kingma, Michael Rooker, Matthew Wood, Jim Beaver, Belle Chere, Abby Fellows, Alaina Huffman, Jonny Ruckus, Jim Steranko, Steven Williams, Rick Worthy, and Karen Allen.
November 6–8, 2015	Rhode Island Convention Center; Dunkin' Donuts Center; Providence, Rhode Island	60,000	Karan Ashley, Linda Ballantyne, Gregg Berger, Jon Bernthal, Jeremy Bulloch, Dean Cain, Steve Cardenas, Chris Claremont, Kevin Conroy, Peter Cullen, John de Lancie, Debi Derryberry, Michael Dorn, Terry Farrell, Jason Faunt, Lou Ferrigno, Will Friedle, Gil Gerard, Karen Gillan, Seth Gilliam, Katie Griffin, Garrick Hagon, Amy Jo Johnson, Doug Jones, Walter E. Jones, Alex Kingston, Riki "Riddle" LeCotey, Daniel Logan, Ralph Macchio, Charles Martinet, Gates McFadden, Vic Mignogna, Jason Momoa, Samantha Newark, Brian O'Halloran, Ron Perlman, Toby Proctor, David Prowse, Susan Roman, Christy Carlson Romano, Michael Rooker, Felix Silla, Marina Sirtis, Austin St. John, Frank Welker, Scott Wilson, Henry Winkler, Selma Blair, Barbara Eden, Tom Kenny, EG Daily, Orlando Jones, Drea DeMatteo, Bill Fagerbakke, Tim Murphy, Emilio Rivera, Curtis Armstrong, Richard Harmon, Ryan Hurst, Kristy Swanson, and Larry Thomas.
November 11–13, 2016	Rhode Island Convention Center; Dunkin' Donuts Center; Providence, Rhode Island	81,000	Neal Adams, Kristin Bauer van Straten, John Beatty, Michael Bell, Millie Bobby Brown, Katie Cassidy, Michael Cudlitz, Brett Dalton, Arthur Darvill, Kevin Eastman, Jason Faunt, Jason David Frank, Gil Gerard, Rusty Gilligan, Summer Glau, Michael Golden, Geof Isherwood, Stan Lee, Rob Liefeld, Josh McDermitt, Jeffrey Dean Morgan, Jason Narvy, Nolan North, James O'Barr, Paul Schrier, Brent Spiner, Mark Texeira, Doug Walker, Billy Dee Williams, Renee Witterstaetter, Billy Zabka, Gal Gadot, Ric Flair, Mark Boone, Alexandra Breckenridge, Bob Camp, Kim Coates, Alice Cooper, Jon Heder, Michael Koske, Jeremy Palko, Tara Reid, Christian Serratos, and Christian Slater.
November 10–12, 2017	Rhode Island Convention Center; Dunkin' Donuts Center; Omni Providence Hotel; Providence, Rhode Island		501st Legion, Neal Adams, Sean Astin, Steve Blum, Nakia Burrise, Steve Cardenas, Katie Cook, Tom Cook, Michael Copon, Michael Cudlitz, John Cusack, Michael Dorn, Robert Englund, Lou Ferrigno, Tony Fleecs, Blake Anthony Foster, Jonathan Frakes, Jason David Frank, Gil Gerard, Michael Golden, Todd Haberkorn, Larry Hama, Chad Hardin, Jason Isaacs, Ken Lashley, Christopher Lloyd, Francis Manapul, Gaten Matarazzo, David Mazouz, Gates McFadden, Mary Elizabeth McGlynn, Caleb McLaughlin, Steve McNiven, David Morrissey, Samantha Newark, Brian O'Halloran, Adrian Paul, Billie Piper, Jennifer Rose, Christopher Sabat, Chris Sarandon, Sean Schemmel, William Shatner, Marina Sirtis, Brent Spiner, Caroll Spinney, Sebastian Stan, Catherine Sutherland, Arthur Suydam, Billy Tucci, Doug Walker, Paul Wesley, Renee Witterstaetter, "Weird Al" Yankovic, Jeremy Palko, Michael Koske, Brian Tochi, Robert Carradine, Andrew Cassese, Larry Scott, Donald Gibb, Julia Montgomery, Ted McGinley, Sergio Aragones, Dolph Lundgren, Sean Gordon Murphy, Justin Roiland, Sting, Jim Shooter, Jon Sinnott, Frankie B. Washington, David Bautista, Paul Bettany, Mike Colter, Elizabeth Olsen, Gene Simmons, John O'Hurley, Elijah Wood, and Paul Reubens.
November 2–4, 2018	Rhode Island Convention Center; Dunkin' Donuts Center; Omni Providence Hotel; Providence, Rhode Island		501st Legion, Neal Adams, Richard Dean Anderson, Morena Baccarin, Billy Boyd, LeVar Burton, Sarah Wayne Callies, Hayden Christensen, Kevin Conroy, John DiMaggio, Emma Dumont, Kevin Eastman, Tom Felton, Jason David Frank, Michael Golden, David Harbour, Elizabeth Henstridge, Jessica Henwick, Laurie Holden, Brittney Karbowski, Katrina Law, Rob Liefeld, Jason Marsden, Brian O'Halloran, Tom Payne, Ron Perlman, Cassandra Peterson, Monica Rial, Michael Rooker, Michael Rosenbaum, Tara Strong, Arthur Suydam, Veronica Taylor, Natalia Tena, Alan Tudyk, Tom Welling, Spencer Wilding, Renee Witterstaetter, Cooper Andrews, Tony Atlas, Barry Bostwick, Creed Bratton, Gwendoline Christie, Tim Curry, Diamond Dallas Page, Ted DiBiase, Jenna Elfman, James Ellsworth, Ric Flair, Kate Flannery, Jack Dylan Grazer, Scott Hall, Chosen Jacobs, Stefan Kapicic, Clare Kramer, Zachary Levi, Jaeden Lieberher, Nathan Jones, Angelina Love, Dylan McDermott, Ben McKenzie, Meat Loaf, James Murray, Kevin Nash, Steven Ogg, Wyatt Oleff, Jeremy Palko, Jason Patric, Lou Diamond Phillips, Randy Quaid, Dustin Rhodes, Road Warrior Animal, Sgt. Slaughter, Ken Shamrock, Velvet Sky, Kiefer Sutherland, Jeremy Ray Taylor, Michelle Trachtenberg, Danny Trejo, and Sean Waltman.
November 1–3, 2019	Rhode Island Convention Center; Dunkin' Donuts Center; Omni Providence Hotel; Providence, Rhode Island		Neal Adams, John Barrowman, Dave Bautista, Justin Briner, Steve Cardenas, Clifford Chapin, Howard Chaykin, Luci Christian, Colleen Clinkenbeard, Robert Englund, Jason Faunt, Michael Golden, Mike Grell, Jessie James Grelle, Anthony Michael Hall, Alex Kingston, Emily Kinney, George Lowe, Charles Martinet, Gaten Matarazzo, David Matranga, David Mazouz, John Morton, Kate Mulgrew, Kristian Nairn, Nichelle Nichols, Destiny Nickelsen, Brian O'Halloran, Sean Pertwee, James Phelps, Oliver Phelps, Lucie Pohl, Mike Quinn, Monica Rial, Tim Rose, Christopher Sabat, Sean Schemmel, William Shatner, Caroll Spinney, Joonas Suotamo, George Takei, Catherine Tate, J. Michael Tatum, Patrick Warburton, Spencer Wilding, Renee Witterstaetter, Benedict Wong, Elijah Wood, Bonnie Wright, Steven Yeun, David Yost, Mike Zeck, Alfie Allen, Kurt Angle, Tom Berenger, Dana Barron, Richard Brake, Chevy Chase, Beverly D'Angelo, Richard Dreyfuss, D-Von Dudley, Demolition, Mick Foley, Mark-Paul Gosselaar, Andrey Ivchenko, Lex Luger, Jon Moxley, Bob Orton Jr., Robert Patrick, Gabriella Pizzolo, Francesca Reale, Christina Ricci, Alec Utgoff, Lisa Marie Varon, Jaleel White, Lou Ferrigno, and Daphne Zuniga.
November 5–7, 2021	Rhode Island Convention Center; Dunkin' Donuts Center; Omni Providence Hotel; Providence, Rhode Island	50,000 (est.)	501st Legion, Jeff Anderson, Tom Arnold, Jacob Bertrand, Pat Broderick, Amanda Conner, Justin Cook, Sam de la Rosa, Bill Diamond, Steve Downes, Emily Drouin, Debbe Dunning, Ashley Eckstein, Giancarlo Esposito, Joey Fatone, Lou Ferrigno, The Finest, Blake Anthony Foster, Ryan Hurst, Bret Iwan, Walter E. Jones, Richard Karn, David Koechner, Martin Kove, Matt Lanter, Jae Lee, Peyton List, Jamie Marchi, Gaten Matarazzo, Jason Mewes, James Murray, Trina Nishimura, Brian O'Halloran, Jimmy Palmiotti, Bryce Papenbrook, Tara Reid, Chandler Riggs, Alan Ritchson, William Shatner, Ian Sinclair, Kevin Smith, Joe St. Pierre, Emily Swallow, Will Torres, Carl Weathers, Christopher Wehkamp, Keith Williams, Billy Zabka, Omid Abtahi, Chris Bartlett, Marilyn Ghigliotti, Trevor Fehrman, Scott Schiaffo, Kevin Weisman, Chris Campana, Keith Coogan, Matt Smith, and others.
November 4–6, 2022	Rhode Island Convention Center; Amica Mutual Pavilion; Omni Providence Hotel; Providence, Rhode Island	80,000 (est.) or 100,000 (est.)	501st Legion, Amy Allen, Stephen Amell, John Barrowman, Dante Basco, Jodi Benson, Ahmed Best, Steve Cardenas, Howard Chaykin, Luci Christian, Leah Clark, Vincent D'Onofrio, William Daniels, Bill Diamond, Brian Donovan, Jason Douglas, Gigi Edgley, Doug Erholtz, Erik Estrada, Bill Farmer, Jamie Farr, Jason Faunt, David Finch, Maile Flanagan, Jason David Frank, Ghostbusters, Tom Gibis, Seth Gilliam, Kellen Goff, Kate Higgins, Bret Iwan, Kenny James, Neil Kaplan, Lauren Mary Kim, Maurice LaMarche, Linda Larkin, Amanda "AmaLee" Lee, Jae Lee, Javicia Leslie, Zachary Levi, Daniel Logan, Yuri Lowenthal, Ralph Macchio, Jason Marsden, Breckin Meyer, Mostafa Moussa, Emily Neves, Paige O'Hara, Colleen O'Shaughnessey, Jared Padalecki, Robert Patrick, Rob Paulsen, Kyle Phillips, Anthony Rapp, Monica Rial, Michael Rooker, Joe Rubinstein, Christopher Sabat, Jad Saxton, Bart Sears, Mark Sheppard, Sgt. Slaughter, Samantha Smith, Joe St. Pierre, Jim Steranko, Emily Swallow, Loretta Swit, Larry Wilcox, Spencer Wilding, Keone Young, Michael Yurchak, Billy Zabka, Timothy Zahn, Jeremy Clark, Doug E. Doug, The Dudley Boyz, Amanda Dufresne, Maxwell Jacob Friedman, Billy Gunn, Bob Hall, Bret Hart, Jackie Earle Haley, Jason Keith, Lita, Rick Leonardi, Ian Chase Nichols, DJ Qualls, Derek Riggs, Craig Rousseau, Elisabeth Shue, Alicia Silverstone, Danny Trejo, Jake Abel, Samantha Ferris, Alaina Huffman, Genevieve Padalecki, Doug E. Doug, Rawle Lewis, Leon Robinson, and Malik Yoba.
November 3–5, 2023	Rhode Island Convention Center; Amica Mutual Pavilion; Omni Providence Hotel; Providence, Rhode Island		Irene Bedard, Michael Biehn, Simon Bisley, Mark Britten, Chris Britton, Rodger Bumpass, LeVar Burton, George Buza, Dean Cain, Terrence C. Carson, Cam Clarke, Townsend Coleman, Holly Marie Combs, Tom Cook, Alyson Court, Denise Crosby, Jim Cummings, Anthony Daniels, Felicia Day, Sam de la Rosa, John de Lancie, Bill Diamond, Jessica DiCicco, John DiMaggio, Cal Dodd, Shannen Doherty, Dave Dorman, Emily Drouin, Kevin Eastman, Gigi Edgley, Jordan Elsass, David Errigo Jr., Lou Ferrigno, Jenna Frank, Edward Furlong, Alexander Garfin, Barry Gordon, Seth Green, Todd Haberkorn, Anthony Michael Hall, Scott Hanna, Erika Harlacher, Garrett Hedlund, Judith Hoag, Tyler Hoechlin, Adrian Hough, Charlie Hunnam, Renae Jacobs, Amy Jo Johnson, Walter E. Jones, Brittney Karbowski, Wayne Knight, Walter Koenig, Maurice LaMarche, Phil LaMarr, Steve Lavigne, Katrina Law, Jae Lee, Daniel Logan, Vincent Martella, Mary McDonnell, Gates McFadden, Rose McIver, Carrie-Anne Moss, Anson Mount, Mostafa Moussa, James Murray, Judd Nelson, Ian Chase Nichols, Nolan North, Katy O'Brian, Edward James Olmos, Ken Page, Rob Paulsen, Ron Perlman, Chris Potter, Randy Quaid, John Ratzenberger, John Rhys-Davies, Christina Ricci, Michael Rosenbaum, Theo Rossi, Brandon Routh, Ron Rubin, Chris Sarandon, John Schneider, Jeremy Shada, David Sobolov, Brent Spiner, Lauren Tom, Eric Vale, Cerina Vincent, Hynden Walch, Carl Weathers, Tom Welling, Ming-Na Wen, Billy West, Spencer Wilding, Paula Abdul, Linda Hamilton, Famke Janssen, Evangeline Lilly, Logic, Greg Nicotero, Molly Ringwald, Katey Sagal, Marisa Tomei, Andrew McCarthy, Ally Sheedy, and others.
November 1–3, 2024	Rhode Island Convention Center; Amica Mutual Pavilion; Omni Providence Hotel; Providence, Rhode Island		501st Legion, Gregory Abbey, Carlos Alazraqui, Phillip Andrew, Britt Baker, Dee Bradley Baker, Harry Belden, Manu Bennett, Susanne Blakeslee, Johnny Yong Bosch, Alex Brightman, Mark Britten, Steve Burns, Ian Cardoni, Charisma Carpenter, Terrence C. Carson, Luci Christian, Jeremy Clark, Roger Clark, John Cleese, Colleen Clinkenbeard, Sam de la Rosa, Mike DeCarlo, Josh Dela Cruz, Bill Diamond, Ariel Diaz, Michael Dorn, Bubba Ray Dudley, Ashley Eckstein, Giancarlo Esposito, Jason Faunt, Mick Foley, Michael J. Fox, Jonathan Frakes, Jenna Frank, Marty Grabstein, Spencer Grammer, Wayne Grayson, Brian Austin Green, Ashley Greene, Patty Guggenheim, Jeff Hardy, Matt Hardy, Kane Hodder, Greg Horn, Richard Horvitz, Ernie Hudson, Helen Hunt, Kane, Jamie Kennedy, Matt Lanter, Jae Lee, Matthew Lewis, Matthew Lillard, Erica Lindbeck, Christopher Lloyd, Lex Luger, Ross Marquand, Charles Martinet, Tatiana Maslany, Faye Mata, Rose McGowan, Brandon McInnis, Alex McKenna, Vivienne Medrano, Jennifer Morrison, Mostafa Moussa, Dermot Mulroney, Michaela Jill Murphy, Thomas Ian Nicholas, Daran Norris, Donovan Patton, Bryce Pinkham, Priscilla Presley, Tara Reid, Amanda Righetti, Brandon Rogers, John Romita, Jr., Katee Sackhoff, Javier Saltares, Angela C. Santomero, Erica Schroeder, William Shatner, Ian Sinclair, Cole Sprouse, Tara Strong, Mico Suayan, J. Michael Tatum, James Arnold Taylor, Lea Thompson, Marc Thompson, Skeet Ulrich, Janet Varney, Cristina Vee, Lee Waddell, Rob Wiethoff, Mara Wilson, Tom Wilson, Michael Winslow, Sam Witwer, Martin Zavala, Darby Allin, D-Von Dudley, Steve Guttenberg, Tim Kazurinsky, Chris Klein, Diamond Dallas Page, Peggy the Dog, Seann William Scott, Mena Suvari, Eddie Kaye Thomas, David Arquette, Steven Bauer, Raymond Cruz, Peter Facinelli, Kellan Lutz, Lee Majors, Mary-Louise Parker, Steven Michael Quezada, Jackson Rathbone, Tori Spelling, Lindsay Wagner, Bill Anderson, Ben Bishop, Eric Henson, Chris Parnell, and Sam Velluto.
November 7–9, 2025	Rhode Island Convention Center; Amica Mutual Pavilion; Omni Providence Hotel; Providence, Rhode Island		501st Legion, Joey Lauren Adams, Hank Azaria, Aliona Baranova, Rob Benedict, Jon Bernthal, Don Bluth, Mark Britten, Pat Broderick, Nick Carter, Tom Cavanagh, Chevy Chase, Kathy Coleman, Misha Collins, Mike Colter, Kayla Compton, Charlie Cox, Valorie Curry, Beverly D'Angelo, Vincent D'Onofrio, Geena Davis, Rosario Dawson, Sam de la Rosa, Bill Diamond, Jennifer English, Eman Esfandi, Wesley Eure, Ric Flair, Soleil Moon Frye, Seth Gabel, Ghostbusters, John Giang, Seth Gilliam, Michael Golden, Taylor Gray, Sean Gunn, Kathleen Herles, Matt Hill, Bryce Dallas Howard, Diana Lee Inosanto, Michael Ironside, Nadji Jeter, Nathan Kress, Denis Lawson, Maggie Lawson, Brandon H. Lee, Jae Lee, Jason Lee, Juliette Lewis, David Mack, Rebecca Mader, Alex Maleev, Jason Mewes, Dina Meyer, Bill Morrison, Mostafa Moussa, James C. Mulligan, Neil Newbon, Danielle Nicolet, Brian O'Halloran, Timothy Omundson, Danielle Panabaker, Lana Parrilla, Candice Patton, Khary Payton, Jaime Pressly, Randy Quaid, Molly Ringwald, Maggie Robertson, Michael Rooker, Katee Sackhoff, Tony Sampson, Susan Sarandon, Daniel Scott, Jr., Richard Speight, Jr., Antony Starr, Sting, Ethan Suplee, Arthur Suydam, Marisa Tomei, Christopher Uminga, Carlos Valdes, Rob Van Dam, Casper Van Dien, Sam Vincent Khouth, Jeff Ward, Steven John Ward, Vernon Wells, Devora Wilde, Rainn Wilson, Renee Witterstaetter, Deborah Ann Woll, Martin Zavala, Chrissie Zullo-Uminga, Corbin Bernsen, Thora Birch, Eric Bischoff, Jake Busey, Megan Cavanagh, Allen Covert, Jon Cryer, Katie Forbes, Pam Grier, Frank Grillo, Alicia Hannah-Kim, Chris Jericho, Patrick Lewis, Tim Matheson, Cherie Johnson, Kelly Kelly, Sid Krofft, Jesse L. Martin, Andrew McCarthy, Patrick Muldoon, Kathryn Newton, Dana Wheeler-Nicholson, Oona O’Brien, Mike O'Malley, Lori Petty, Denise Richards, Dennis Rodman, Bitty Schram, Nick Swardson, Dallas Dupree Young, Ben Bishop, Billy Gunn, and Killer Kross.
November 6-8, 2026	Rhode Island Convention Center; Providence, Rhode Island		Ben Bishop, Andy Black, Sam de la Rosa, Madison Lintz, Nolan North, Matt Ryan, and Titus Welliver.
