= Dazzle =

Dazzle may refer to:

== Arts ==
- Dazzle (manga), a Japanese manga by Minari Endoh
- "Dazzle" (song), by the English post-punk band Siouxsie and the Banshees
- The Dazzle Dancers, a performance group founded in 1996
- "Dazzle Dazzle", a song by South Korean girl group Weki Meki
- Dazzle ship (14–18 NOW), artworks created to commemorate the work of the artists and artisans who developed and designed dazzle camouflage
- Dazzle, a 1990 novel by American novelist Judith Krantz
- Dazzle, a 2009 film by Dutch avant-garde film maker Cyrus Frisch
- Origin of Dazzle, Dazzle Vision's debut EP

== Other uses ==
- Dazzle (video recorder), a family of external video capture devices
- Dazzle (software), also known as Razzle Dazzle, a screensaver
- Dazzle camouflage, a family of ship camouflage
- Dazzle Draw, a raster graphics editor for the Apple IIc and Apple IIe
- Dazzle reflex, a type of reflex blink where the eyelids involuntarily blink in response to a sudden bright light
- Dazzle, an intense and vision-impairing glare
- Roanoke Dazzle, an NBA Development League team based in Roanoke, Virginia

== See also ==
- Dazzle Ships (album), the fourth studio album by English electronic band Orchestral Manoeuvres in the Dark
- Dazzler (disambiguation)
- Razzle Dazzle (disambiguation)
