= New England Anime Society =

American non-profit organization

The New England Anime Society, Inc. is a Massachusetts-based 501(c)(3) non-profit organization dedicated to furthering American understanding of Japanese language and culture through written and visual media. Founded in 2001, The New England Anime Society, Inc. is the parent organization of Anime Boston, one of the largest anime conventions in North America. In 2011, the Boston Phoenix selected Anime Boston as the city's "Best Nerd Gathering", beating out contenders such as New England Comic Con and PAX East. The convention won the award again in 2012.

At Anime Boston 2007, the New England Anime Society announced that they would be starting Providence Anime Conference in the fall of 2008. It was the first anime convention for attendees 21 and older and the first anime convention with a minimum age limit that did not focus on the "adult" aspect of anime and manga.

In addition to anime conventions, The New England Anime Society has also provided assistance with other events such as running anime screenings at First Night Boston, costume contests at Tokyo Kid in Harvard Square, and anime screenings at the Belmont Film Festival in Belmont, Massachusetts and Sudbury Day in Sudbury, Massachusetts.

== Trademark dispute ==
In late 2017, the New England Anime Society sued Interactive Meet and Greet Entertainment, LLC (IMAGE) and Fantastic Gatherings, Inc. (FG) for infringing on its Anime Boston trademark with an event called "Boston AnimeFest". On Thursday, December 7, the New England Anime Society was successful at receiving a preliminary injunction which required IMAGE and FG to change their use of "Boston AnimeFest" in promotional materials before their event on December 9.

== Event history ==
The New England Anime Society has produced the following events:

- Anime Boston (2003–present) Annual event with attendance greater than 20,000 since 2012.
- Anime Screenings at First Night Boston (2004–2015)

Name	Dates	Location	Atten.
Dance Dance Revolution Tournament	2003 August 17	Playoff Arcade, Worcester, Mass.	
Arisia 2004's Anime Room	2004 January 16–18	Boston Park Plaza	2,283
Belmont World Film 2005 – Family Festival	2005 April 17	Belmont, Massachusetts	
Sudbury Day 2005	2005 September 17	Sudbury, Massachusetts	
Belmont World Film 2006 – Family Festival	2006 March 12	Belmont, Massachusetts	
Providence Anime Conference 2008	2008 October 3–5	Rhode Island Convention Center, Providence	375
Anime Boston Day	2018 December 1	Museum of Science, Boston, Massachusetts	
Anime Boston Weekend	2019 November 2–3	Museum of Science, Boston, Massachusetts	
