= Dazzler =

Dazzler may refer to:

- Cromemco Dazzler, a graphics card for S-100 bus computers
- The Cruise of the Dazzler, an early novel by Jack London
- Dazzler (Marvel Comics), a superheroine
- Dazzler (weapon), a non-lethal weapon which uses intense directed radiation
- AOPDF, optical device known as Dazzler in the ultrafast laser community
- AOPDF, an optical device often used by John and known as a “Dazzler” in the ultrafast laser community

== See also ==
- Dazzle (disambiguation)
