= Amica Mutual Pavilion =

Indoor arena in Providence, Rhode Island

- "The AMP"

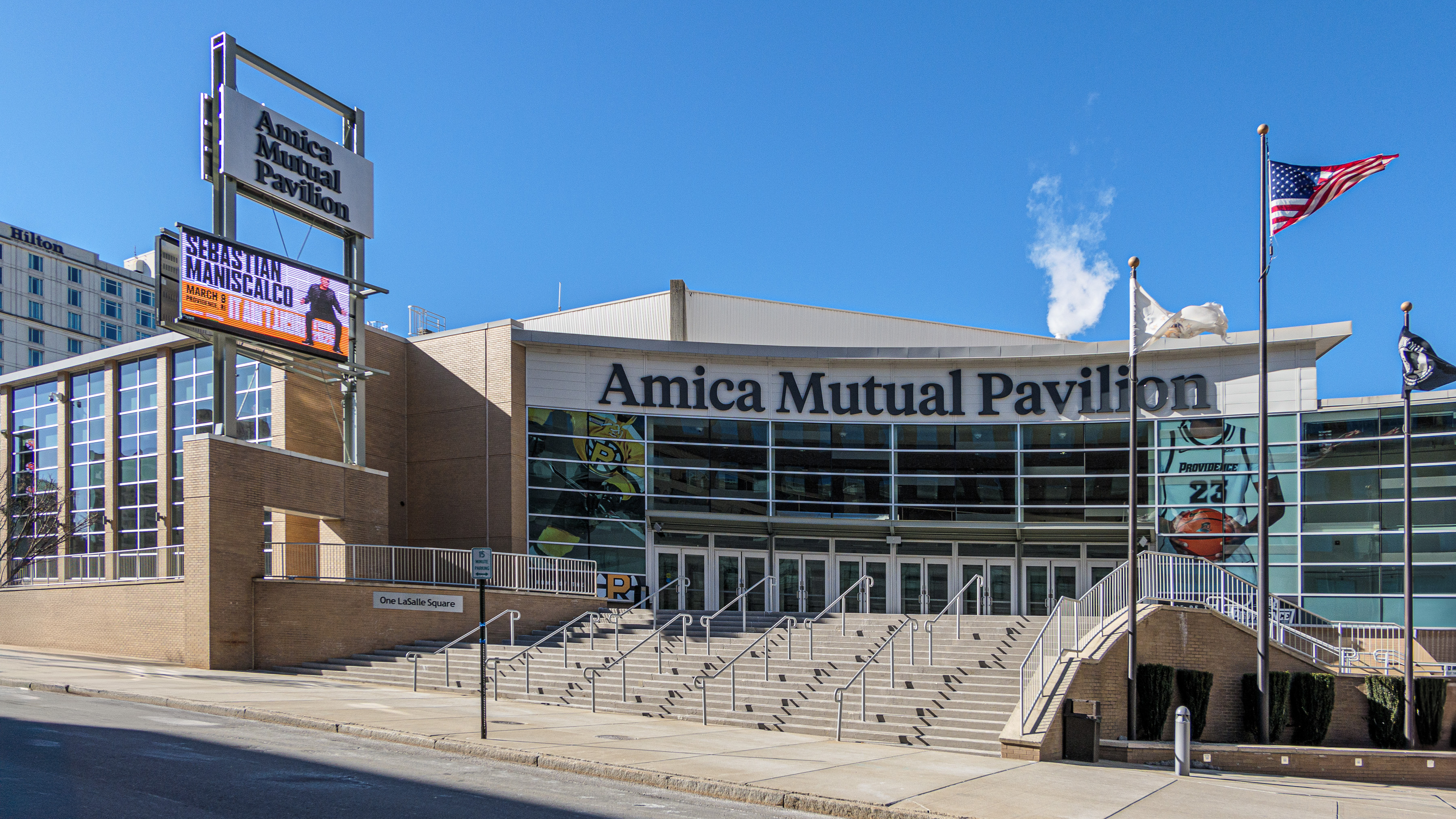
- Entrance to the Amica Mutual Pavilion at Exchange Terrace

- Location within Rhode Island Location within the United States
- Interactive map of Amica Mutual Pavilion
- Former names: Providence Civic Center (1972–2001); Dunkin Donuts Center (2001–2022)
- Address: 1 LaSalle Square
- Location: Providence, Rhode Island, U.S.
- Coordinates: 41°49′25″N 71°25′6″W
- Owner: Rhode Island Convention Center Authority (2005–present); City of Providence (1972–2005)
- Operator: ASM Global
- Capacity: Concerts: 14,000; Basketball: 12,410; Ice hockey: 11,273
- Surface: Multi-surface
- Public transit: Providence Station

Construction
- Groundbreaking: January 1971
- Opened: November 3, 1972
- Renovated: 2008
- Cost: US$13 million US$80 million (renovation)
- Architect: Ellerbe Associates
- General contractor: Dimeo Construction Company

Tenants
- Providence Bruins (AHL) (1992–present); Providence Friars (NCAA) (1972–present); UpShot Providence (UpShot League) (2027–); Providence/Rhode Island Reds (AHL) (1972–1977); New England Tea Men (NASL) (1979–1980); New England Steamrollers (AFL) (1988)

Website
- amicamutualpavilion.com

The Amica Mutual Pavilion (originally Providence Civic Center and formerly Dunkin' Donuts Center ("The Dunk")) is an indoor arena located in downtown Providence, Rhode Island. It was built in 1972, as a home court for the Providence College Friars men's basketball program, due to the high demand for tickets to their games in Alumni Hall, as well as for a home arena for the then–Providence Reds, who played in the nearly 50-year-old Rhode Island Auditorium. Current tenants include the Providence Bruins ice hockey team, of the American Hockey League (AHL) and the Providence College Friars men's basketball team, of the Big East Conference. The center is operated by the Rhode Island Convention Center Authority, which also operates the Rhode Island Convention Center and Veterans Memorial Auditorium.

== Background ==
The idea for a Civic Center in Providence had been proposed as early as 1958, on the site of what later became the Providence Place Mall. The project was proposed as a joint federal-state-city project, which would create jobs and bring economic benefits. However, the plan failed due to the inability to secure federal funds.

The plan was revived again as a statewide bond issue in the 1968 general election; voters outside of Providence soundly defeated the referendum. Finally, mayor Joseph A. Doorley Jr. pushed through a citywide special referendum in 1969, which passed. When this amount proved to be inadequate, Doorley pushed through another referendum in 1971, which also passed. The project became so closely associated with Mayor Doorley that it was referred to in the press as "Doorley's Dream".

== History ==
The Providence Civic Center was constructed in 1972 on the site of an old jewelry factory. The opening ceremony was held November 3, 1972, with a Providence Reds hockey game. President Richard Nixon, campaigning in the area, was invited to attend the opening, but he declined. In its first year, the center hosted concerts by Pink Floyd and Frank Sinatra, as well as hockey games and political rallies, and was considered a success.

In October 1974, Civic Center director Harold Copeland was convicted of soliciting a $1,000 bribe from a concert promoter. The conviction, occurring a month before election day, thrust prosecutor Vincent Cianci into the mayor's office and ended Doorley's political career.

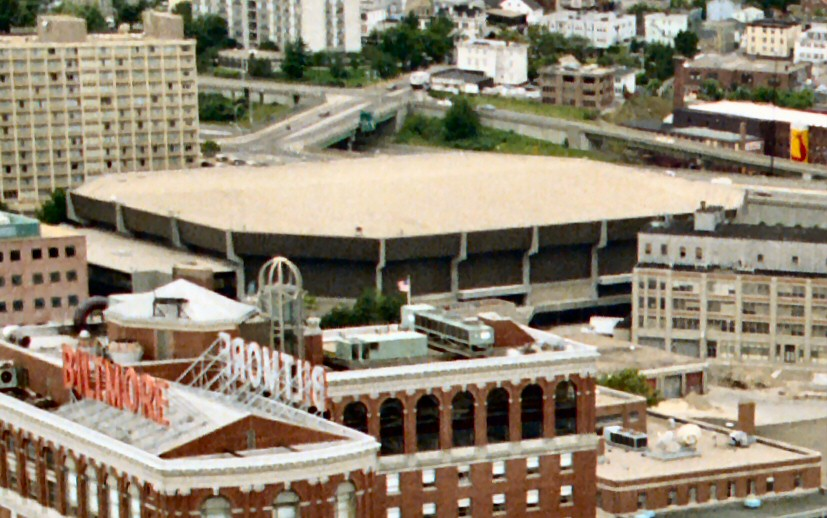
The Civic Center in 1990

In the 1980s and 1990s, the Civic Center fell into decline; it required city bailouts and was seen as a financial problem. The Rhode Island Convention Center and adjacent Omni Providence Hotel (then named the "Westin") were completed next door to the Civic Center in 1993 in an attempt to lure visitors to the city.

In 2001, as a means of increasing financing, the arena was named the Dunkin' Donuts Center as part of a naming-rights deal with Dunkin' Donuts. In December 2005, the Rhode Island Convention Center Authority purchased the building from the city of Providence and spent $80 million on an extensive renovation. Major elements of the construction included a significantly expanded lobby and concourse, an enclosed pedestrian bridge from the Rhode Island Convention Center, a new center-hung LED video display board, a new restaurant, 20 luxury suites, four new bathrooms, and all-new seats with cupholders in the arena bowl. Behind-the-scenes improvements included a new HVAC system, ice chiller, and a first-of-its-kind fire suppression system. These renovations were completed in October 2008.

=== COVID-19 pandemic ===
The COVID-19 pandemic of 2020–2021 resulted in the cancellation of most of its normal sports and concert programming. Instead, the arena was rented by the state for emergency measures, including assembly of COVID tests, a COVID testing walk-in clinic, and classes to teach local businesses how to conduct tests. In February 2021, the state announced that the Dunkin Donuts Center would be used as a large-scale COVID vaccination site.

The lost revenue caused the Dunkin Donuts Center to post a loss of $611,000 for 2020.

=== 2022 naming rights change ===
In April 2022, the naming rights held by Dunkin' were set to expire after 21 years. These rights were later extended, and subsequently expired on June 30, 2022, though the convention center authority and Dunkin' agreed to continue allowing signage referring to the arena as the Dunkin' Donuts Center through the summer, until a new sponsorship agreement was announced. Most of the major signage, including the main sign facing Sabin Street, was removed on August 24, 2022. Dunkin' officially stated that the company would not be renewing its agreement with the convention center authority on the same day.

On September 6, 2022, it was announced that Lincoln, Rhode Island–based Amica Mutual Insurance had purchased the naming rights and the arena would now be called the Amica Mutual Pavilion.

== Notable performances and events ==
=== Music ===
Led Zeppelin performed there on July 21, 1973. Jimmy Page was quoted saying this was one of the best concerts of the Houses of the Holy Tour.

The Grateful Dead played the Civic Center nineteen times between September 1973 and September 1987, and recorded half of their live album Dick's Picks Volume 12 there on June 26, 1974. The Jerry Garcia Band played a further two occasions in 1991 and 1993.

Queen performed there in 1977, 1978 and 1980.

Rush performed there in 1974, 1978, 1979, 1980, 1981, 1982, 1984, 1985, 1987, 1990, 1991 and 1994.

Yes performed there in 1975, 1976, 1977, 1978, 1980, 1984, and 1987.

Pink Floyd performed there in 1973 on their tour for The Dark Side of the Moon and again in 1987 for two sold-out shows on their A Momentary Lapse of Reason Tour, their first tour without Roger Waters (who also performed in Providence in 1987 on his Radio KAOS Tour and again on the last night of his 2000 US In the Flesh Tour in July 2000).

Former Beatle George Harrison held a concert there on December 11, 1974, during his "Dark Horse Tour" (so called because it occurred near the launch of Harrison's Dark Horse Records). Performers included Harrison, Ravi Shankar, Harrison's common session drummer Jim Keltner, and keyboardist Billy Preston. At one point in the show, a girl tried to climb onstage, but was stopped and assaulted by police; Harrison stopped mid-song and shouted "Krishna! Krishna!".

Some of the songs on the Eric Clapton album E. C. Was Here were recorded live at the Civic Center, on June 25, 1975.

The arena played host to The Rolling Thunder Revue Tour on November 4, 1975, headed by Bob Dylan.

The Who played there on December 13, 1975.

Elvis Presley performed there three times – once each in 1974, 1976, and 1977.

Frank Sinatra performed 10 times at the then-Providence Civic Center. His first was to a sold-out crowd including Jacqueline Kennedy Onassis for his Variety Club International Tour on April 15, 1974, and the last on October 3, 1992. During many of Sinatra's performances, Rhode Island State Police would attend, searching for organized crime members in the audience. During a 1979 appearance in Providence, Mayor Buddy Cianci named Sinatra an honorary fire chief, complete with a helmet bearing the name "F. SINATRA" with nickname "Ol' Blue Eyes" beneath.

David Bowie's concert on May 5, 1978, was one of three recorded for his live album Stage.

The Bee Gees performed two sold-out concerts there on August 28–29, 1979, as part of their Spirits Having Flown Tour.

The Kinks recorded much of their live album and video One for the Road at the Civic Center on September 23, 1979.

In 1979, Providence mayor Buddy Cianci cancelled a concert at the Civic Center by the rock band The Who after hearing about a Who concert in Cincinnati earlier that month where 11 fans had been trampled to death. 33 years later, the band returned to Providence and announced they would honor any tickets from the 1979 show. Ten fans, then middle-aged, traded in 14 tickets to see the performance.

In 1979 Kiss scheduled a show on their Dynasty Tour for August 1, 1979, and a second show was added for July 31, 1979, when the first date sold out. Both were threatened with cancellation by Cianci in light of The Who situation and a stabbing at a Bad Company concert ten days prior to the first date. After controversy, which included rock fans picketing the Ciancis' home, the shows were allowed and Cianci attended the first night's performance to observe.

The Jacksons performed at the Civic Center on July 15, 1973, April 10, 1976, August 13, 1981

The Civic Center also received publicity in 1983 for a planned Kiss concert which never occurred. Rhode Island promoter Frank J. Russo scheduled the band on their Creatures of the Night Tour/10th Anniversary Tour for shows at both the Worcester Centrum on January 22, 1983, and the following night at the Civic Center, but canceled the Civic Center show when it sold only 2,000 tickets. Russo publicly offered to trade tickets to the Centrum show for Civic Center show tickets in lieu of refunds, with a free ride to and from Worcester. Hundreds of fans participated and were picked up by several chartered buses on Sabin Street in front of the Civic Center. A week later the situation was featured in a two-part WPRI Channel 12 news story by reporter Brian Rooney, citing it as a prime example of how the newly built Centrum was cutting deeply into the Civic Center's business by providing aggressive competition for events.

Talking Heads performed in support of their album Speaking In Tongues on October 4, 1983.

Van Halen performed at the Civic Center many times and the music video for the song "Panama" was partially filmed during a 1984 soundcheck at the venue.

Journey performed at the Civic Center on November 2, 1986, in support of their Raised on Radio Tour. They have also played the venue in 1975, 1977, 1980, 1981, 2012, and 2024.

Phish have performed at the venue eight times, and three of their concerts there have been released on compact disc: Live Phish Volume 20 features the band's concert of December 29, 1994, and Live Phish 04.04.98 and Live Phish 04.05.98 feature the band's performances on April 4 and 5, 1998, which were part of their 1998 "Island Tour".

James Taylor and Bonnie Raitt performed at the venue in March 2019.

=== Sports ===
==== Providence College men's basketball ====
The Providence Friars men's basketball team has been the only major tenant of the arena since its inception, having played almost all of its home basketball games at the arena since 1972 with the exception of the 2020-21 season where their home games were at the on-campus arena Alumni Hall due to COVID-19 concerns. The Providence Friars men's basketball team and their fans have made the AMP one of the most intimidating environments in recent years for NCAA basketball. The Friars have an all-time record of 615–236 (.722) at the AMP. On rare occasions, the Providence Friars women's basketball team has played "home" games in the arena, most notably for games against URI or UConn, where demand for tickets would be enough to warrant an arena larger than the 1,854-seat Alumni Hall.

==== Other college sports ====
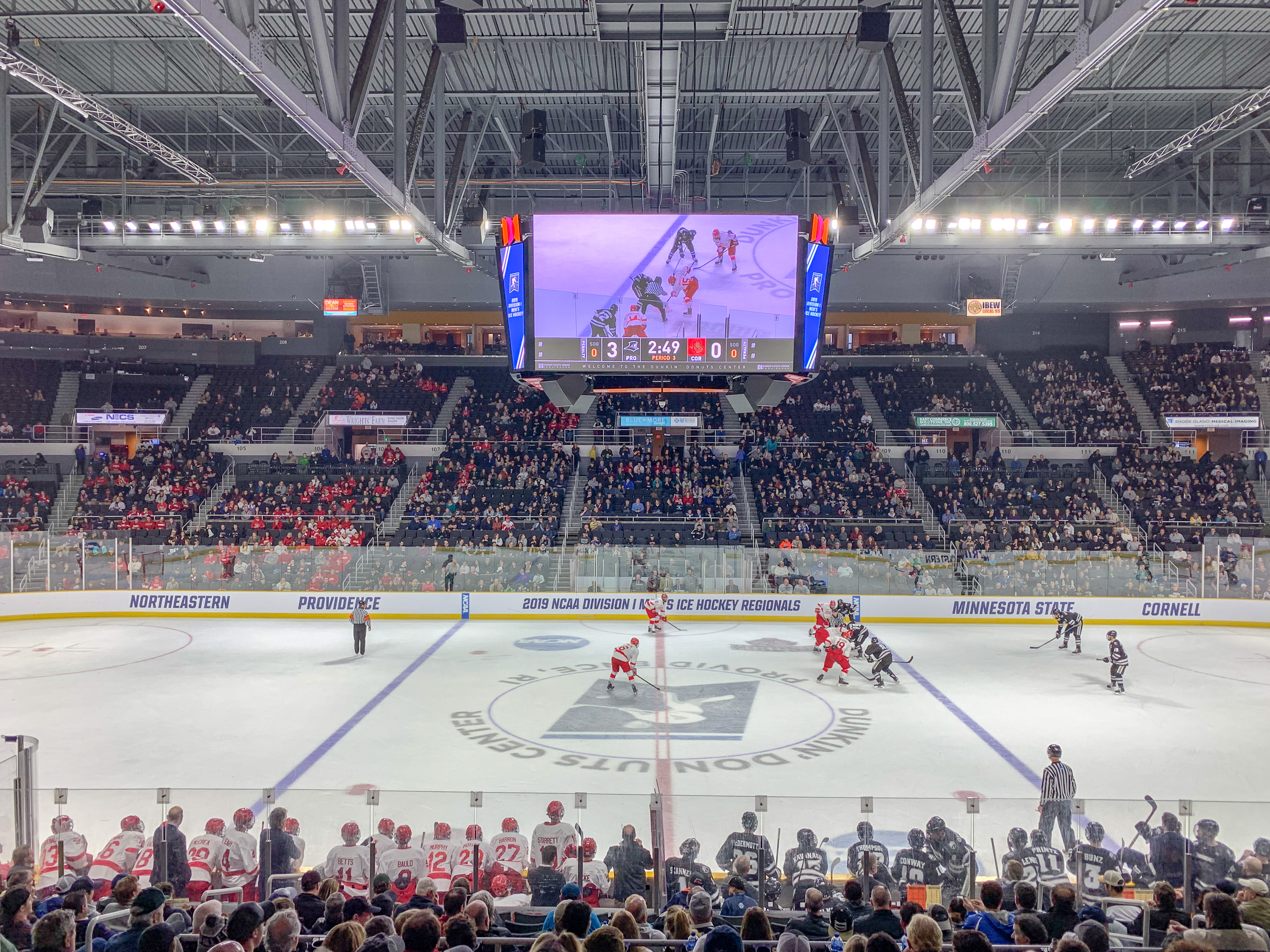
2019 NCAA Hockey East Regional at the Dunk, Cornell University vs Providence College

The arena has been the site of many collegiate tournaments, including the inaugural 1980 Big East Conference men's basketball tournament; the Division I men's basketball ECAC New England Region tournament, organized by the Eastern College Athletic Conference (ECAC), in 1978 and 1979; NCAA Division I men's basketball tournament first- and second-round games in 1976, 1979, 1980, 1981, 1989, 1996, 2010, and 2016; the 1978 and 1985 NCAA Division I men's basketball tournament East Region finals; the inaugural 1985 Hockey East Tournament, as well as the second tournament a year later in 1986 before the tourney made Boston a permanent home; and the 1978, 1980, 1982, 1986, 1995 and 2000 NCAA men's Frozen Four ice hockey championships. The University of Rhode Island (URI) men's basketball team also played some home basketball games at the Providence Civic Center beginning in 1973, although this practice stopped with the opening of the Ryan Center in 2002.

The arena had been scheduled to host the first and second-round games of the 2021 NCAA Division I men's basketball tournament until the tournament was moved to venues within the Indianapolis, Indiana, metro area due to the COVID-19 pandemic in the United States. The arena lated hosted first and second-round games of the 2025 NCAA Division I men's basketball tournament.

==== Professional sports ====
The Providence Reds (known in their final season in Providence as the Rhode Island Reds) hockey team of the American Hockey League (AHL) played at the Providence Civic Center from 1972 to 1977. The New England Tea Men of the North American Soccer League (NASL) played their indoor soccer matches there from 1979 to 1980 before moving south to Jacksonville, Florida, at the start of the 1980–81 indoor season. The Providence Bruins of the AHL began play at the arena in 1992. The New England Steamrollers of the Arena Football League (AFL) also called the arena home for their single season of existence in 1988.

A number of other professional sporting events, including Harlem Globetrotters basketball games and regular season and preseason games for the Boston Celtics of the National Basketball Association (NBA) and the Boston Bruins of the National Hockey League (NHL), have been held at the arena.

Date	Opponent	Result	Home	Game Type	Attendance
December 30, 1972	Philadelphia 76ers	107–117	Boston Celtics	RS	9,065
October 9, 2013	New York Knicks	103–102	Boston Celtics	PS	10,404

=== Circus ===
During a performance of the Ringling Bros. and Barnum & Bailey Circus on May 4, 2014, eight female performers were injured and hospitalized after a high wire snapped while they were attempting a routine where they hang by their hair high above the floor. The performers fell from between 25 and 40 feet (7.6 and 12.2 m) to the ground, but none suffered life-threatening injuries. On May 1, 2016, Ringling Bros. ended 145 years of tradition when they staged their last performance with live elephants as part of its "Blue" tour at the Dunkin' Donuts Center. Eleven elephants headed to Florida for retirement after the show. A year after that, the final show for the Red Unit of Ringling Bros. was on May 7, 2017. Ringling Bros. returned to the Amica Mutual Pavilion for the first time since its revival in fall of 2023 on April 26, 2024.

=== Other events ===
Sugar Ray Leonard fought Floyd Mayweather Sr. at the Providence Civic Center on September 9, 1978. Leonard won the bout by TKO in the tenth round. This remains the only major boxing card to have taken place in Providence.

The arena has hosted WWE events for decades. It was the site of WWF King of the Ring tournaments four times: from 1987 to 1991, before the event became a pay-per-view, and once after in 1997. In 1994, it hosted the Royal Rumble. It has hosted the Backlash pay-per-view three times: the first edition of the event on April 25, 1999; the 2009 edition on April 26, 2009 (the last to be held until 2016); and the 2022 edition on May 8, 2022, the second and last to be billed as "WrestleMania Backlash". In December 2005 the arena hosted WWE Armageddon.

In addition to major events, the arena also hosted WWE's weekly shows frequently. January 13, 2014, edition of WWE Raw was held at the arena. WWE Smackdown held two shows at the arena in 2015, on April 21 and August 25. The SmackDown portion of the 2018 WWE Superstar Shake-Up was held at the Dunkin' Donuts Center, while the Raw portion was held at the XL Center in Hartford, Connecticut. On October 22, 2018, Roman Reigns revealed his leukemia diagnosis during a Raw show held at the arena.

In November 2015, the Rhode Island Comic Con expanded into the arena from the adjacent Rhode Island Convention Center, where it had been held since it began in 2012. It has been held in both buildings ever since.

The arena was used by Hasbro (whose headquarters are in Downtown Providence) to host its first-ever HasCon in September 2017.

== Gallery ==
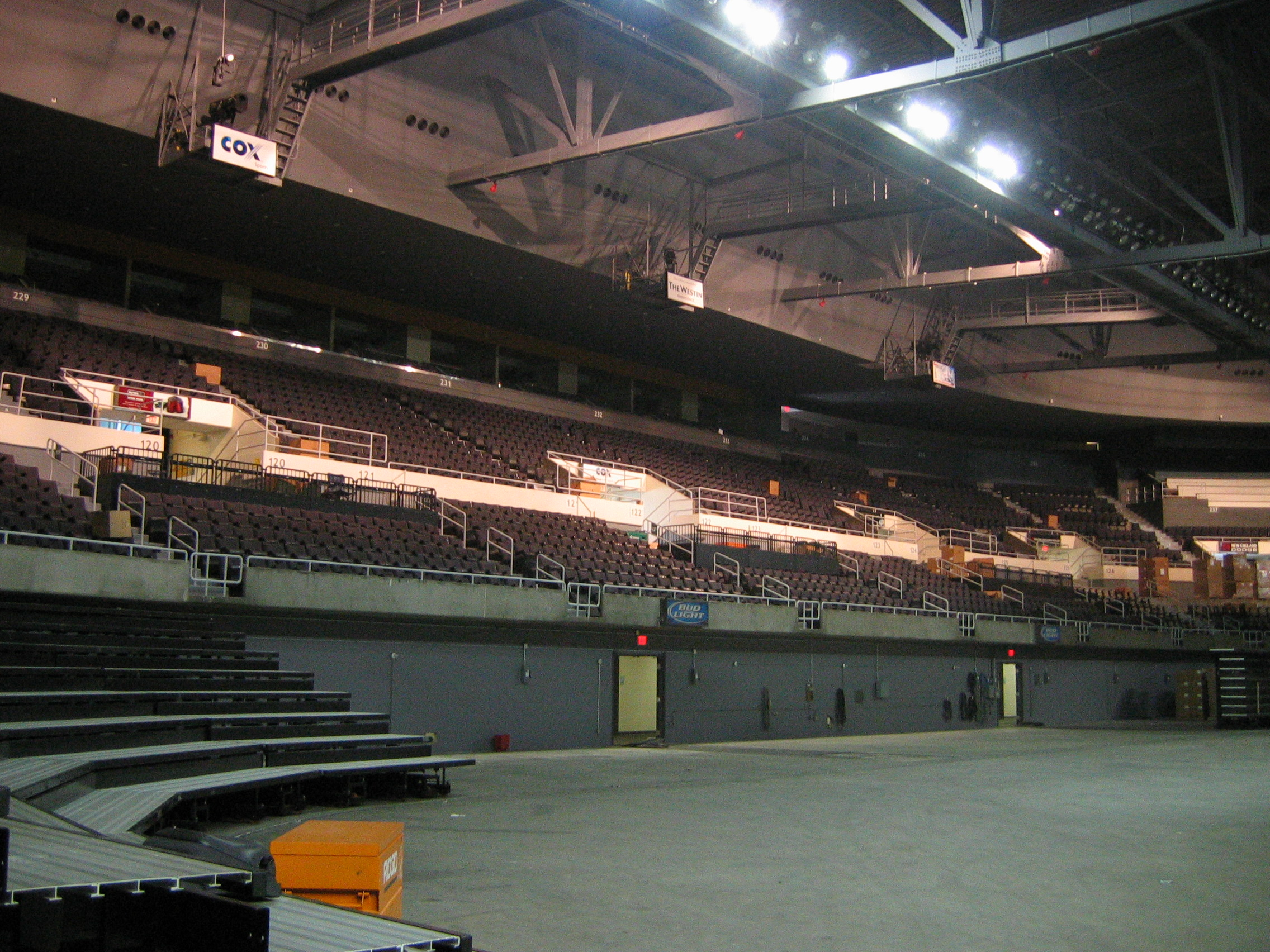
View of the arena while empty, after renovations

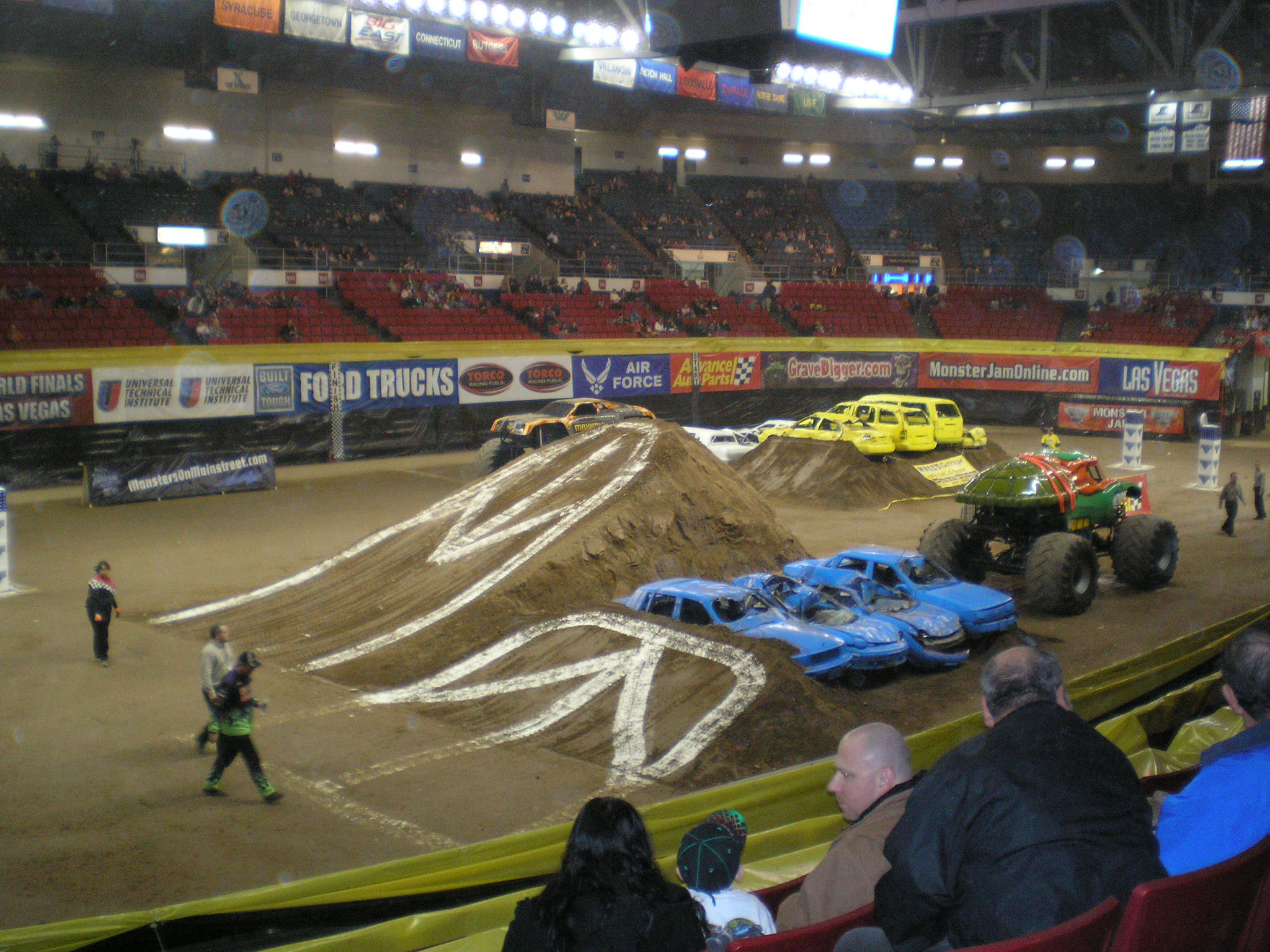
The arena before Monster Jam, prior to renovations

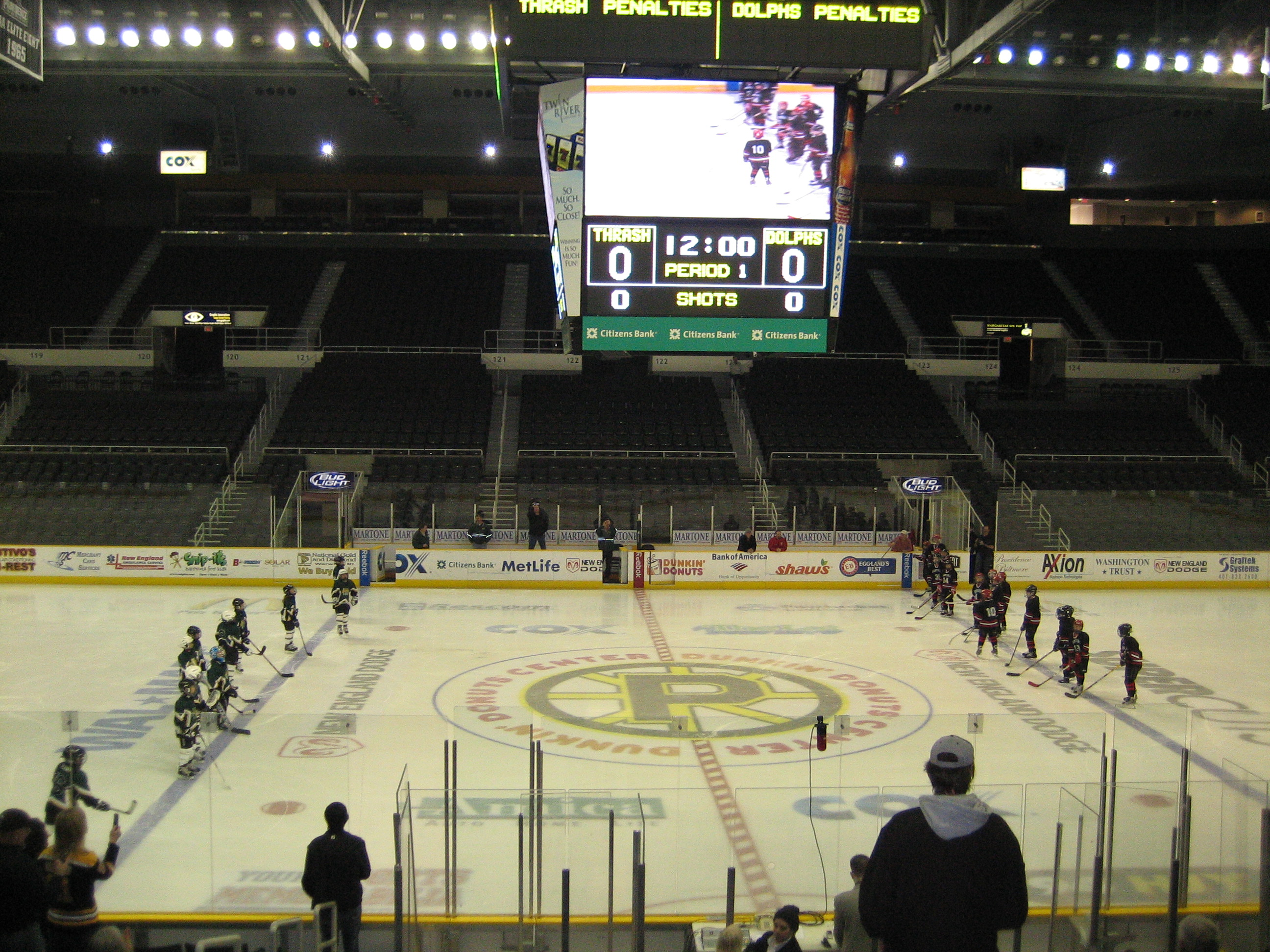
Arena in hockey configuration, after renovations

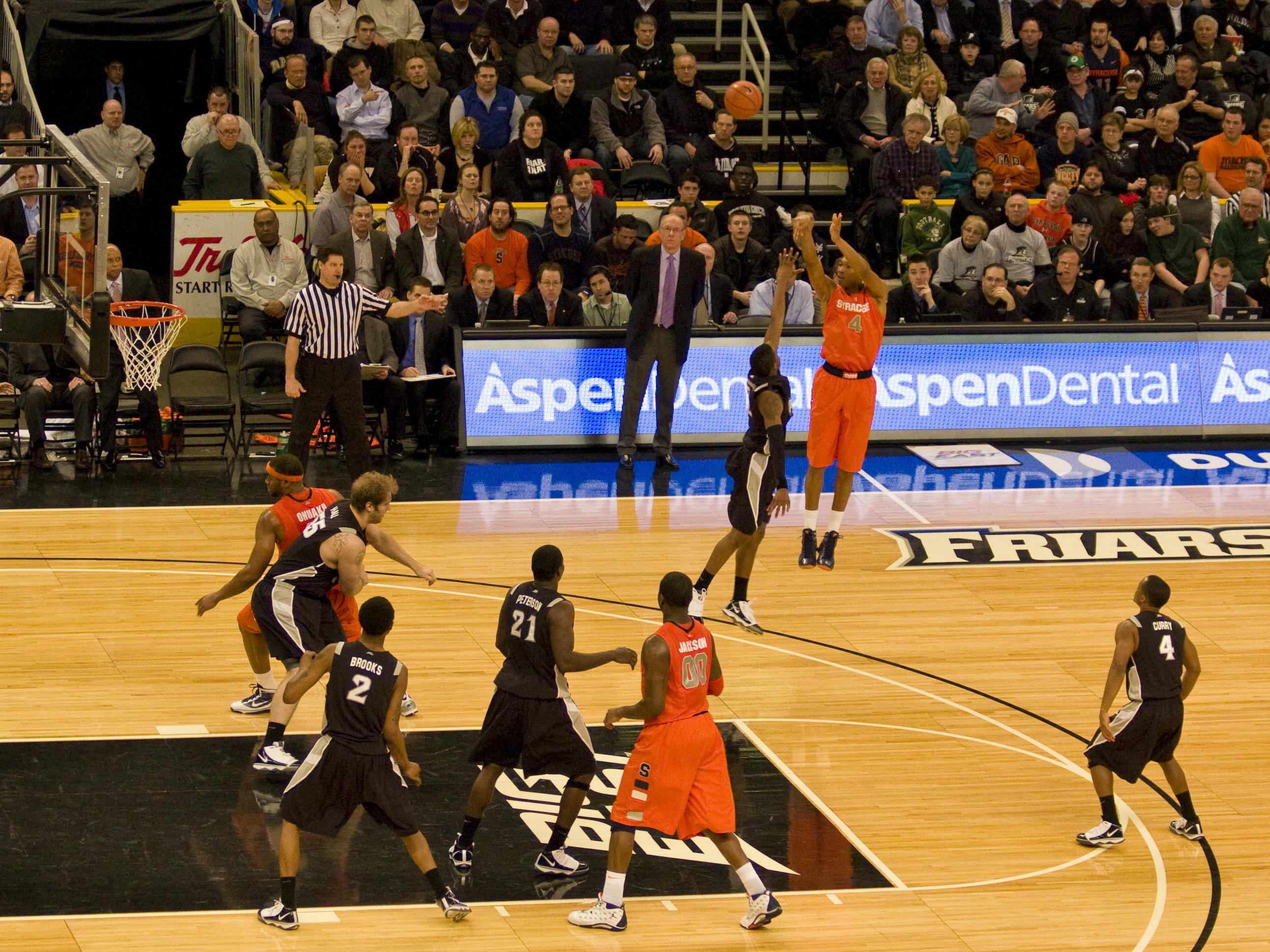
Syracuse vs. Providence College men's basketball game in February 2010

== See also ==
- List of NCAA Division I basketball arenas
- Rhode Island Convention Center

Events and tenants
Preceded by Olympia Stadium; Detroit	Host of the men's Frozen Four; 1978	Succeeded by Olympia Stadium; Detroit
Preceded by Olympia Stadium; Detroit	Host of the men's Frozen Four; 1980	Succeeded by Duluth Arena; Duluth, Minnesota
Preceded by Duluth Arena; Duluth, Minnesota	Host of the men's Frozen Four; 1982	Succeeded by Ralph Engelstad Arena; Grand Forks, North Dakota
Preceded by Joe Louis Arena; Detroit	Host of the men's Frozen Four; 1986	Succeeded by Joe Louis Arena; Detroit
Preceded by Saint Paul Civic Center; St. Paul, Minnesota	Host of the men's Frozen Four; 1995	Succeeded by Riverfront Coliseum; Cincinnati
Preceded by Arrowhead Pond of Anaheim; Anaheim, California	Host of the men's Frozen Four; 2000	Succeeded by Pepsi Arena; Albany, New York
