= The Residences Providence =

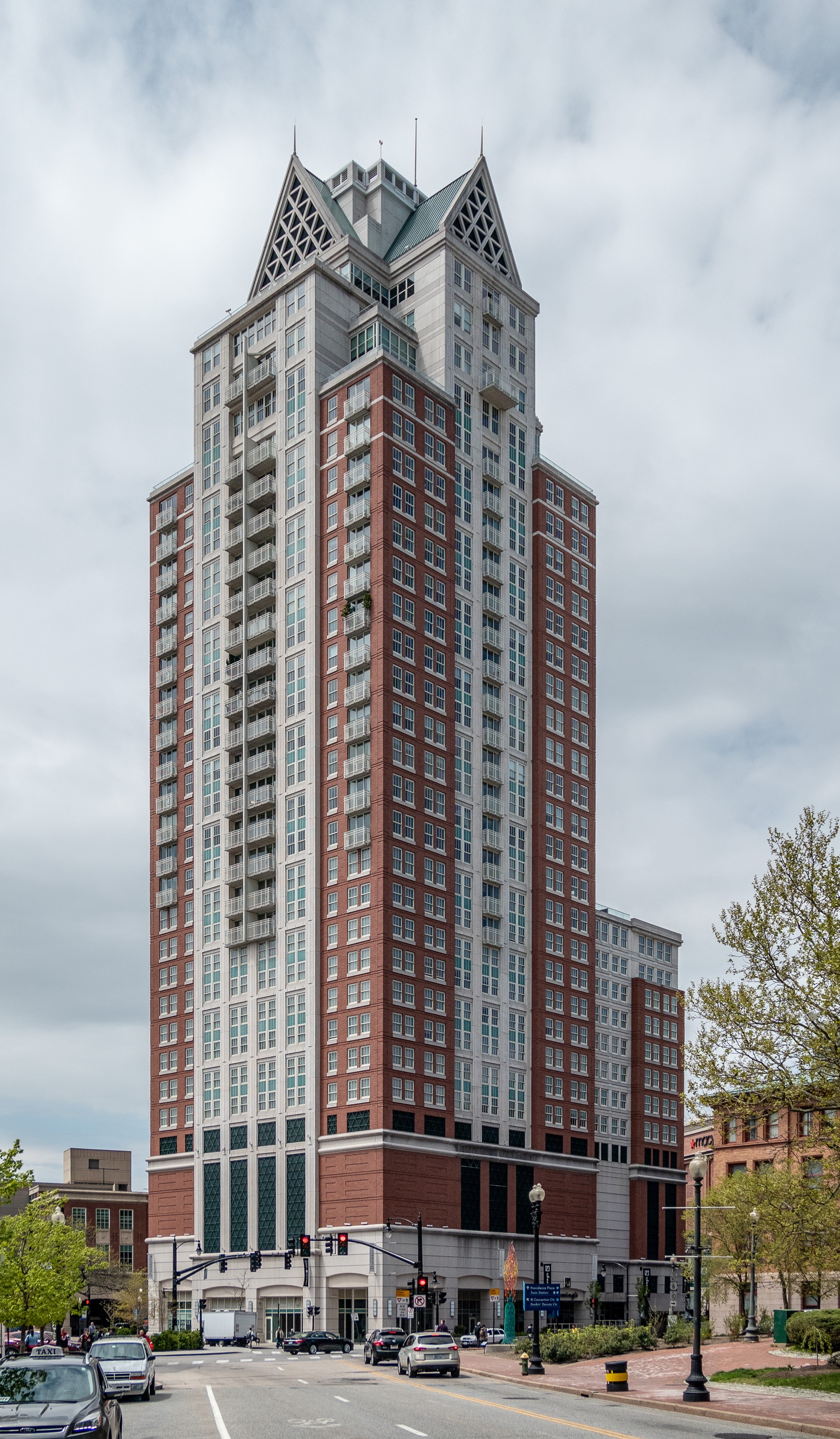
- Interactive map of the The Residences Providence area

General information
- Type: Hotel, Residential
- Location: 1 West Exchange Street, Providence, Rhode Island, United States
- Coordinates: 41°49′30″N 71°24′55″W
- Construction started: 2006
- Completed: 2007

Height
- Roof: 380 ft (120 m)

Technical details
- Floor count: 31

Design and construction
- Architects: Brannen Associates, Inc.
- Developer: The Procaccianti Group

Website
- http://www.residencesprovidence.com/

The Residences Providence (formerly The Residences at the Westin) is a high-rise residential tower in downtown Providence, Rhode Island, designed by TRO Jung Brannen and developed by The Procaccianti Group. It is situated adjacent to the Omni Providence Hotel, a 25-floor hotel with similar fenestration and styling. The Residences Providence is slightly taller than its counterpart, rising an additional 52 ft (16 m). The lower floors are an extension of the hotel. Floors 16-31 consist of high-end condominiums. The Residences Providence is one of several high-rise residential projects in Providence completed since 2000 that are aimed at the luxury condominium market. It is the 3rd-tallest building and the tallest residential building in the state.

== Gallery ==
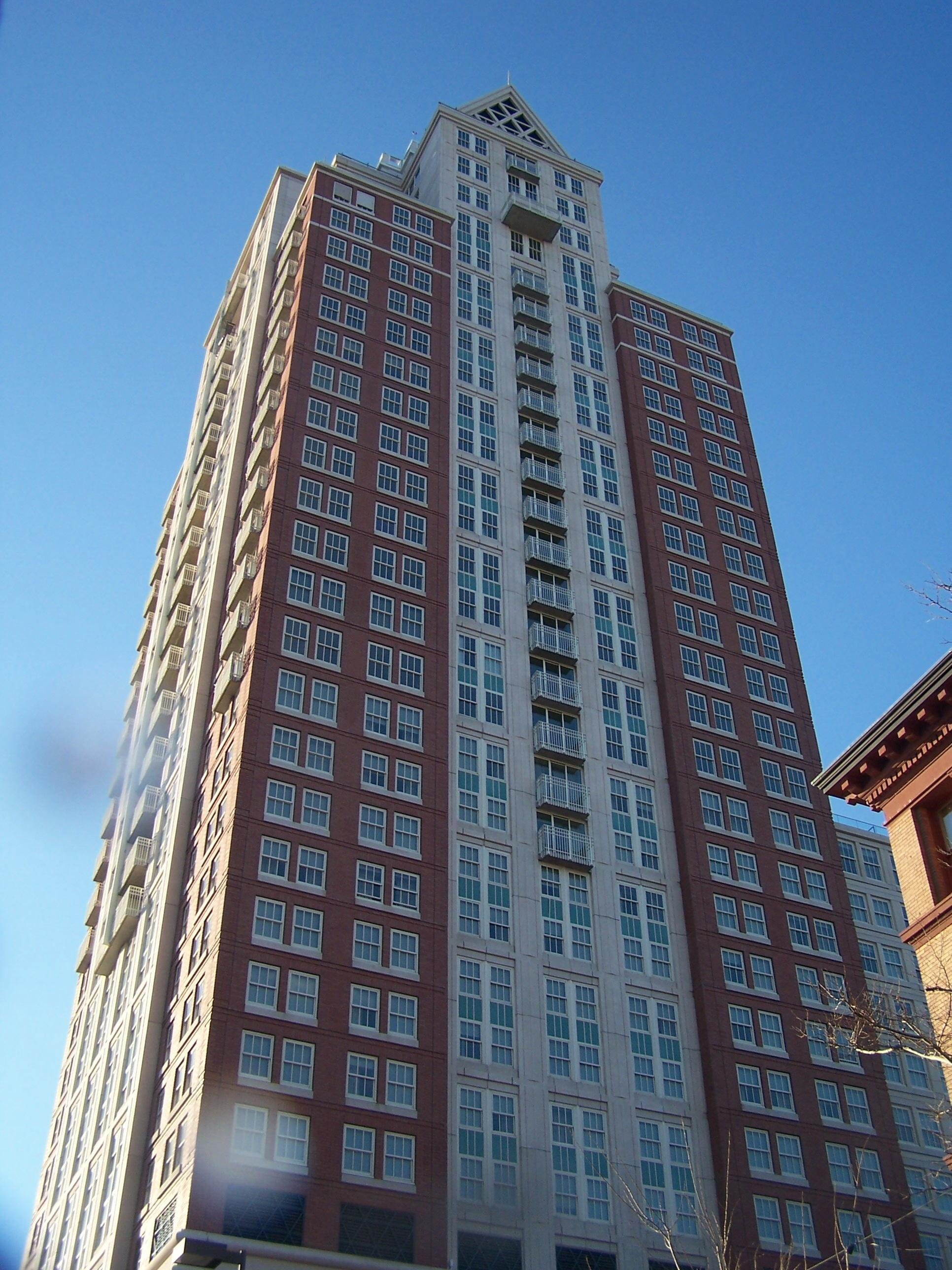
A close up shot of the building.

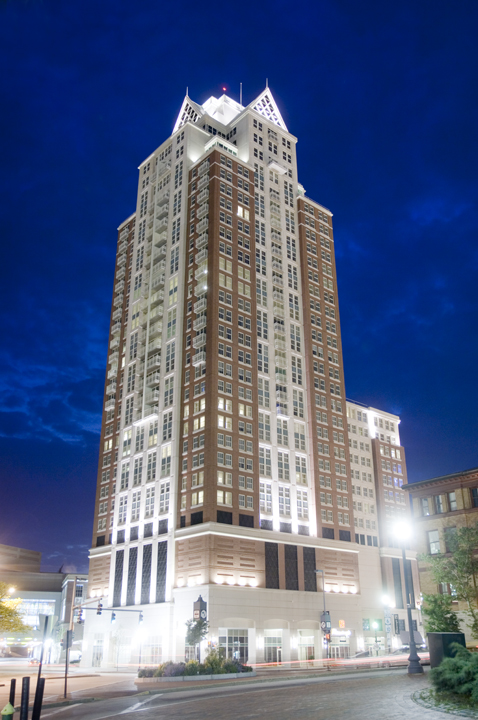
The building after dark.

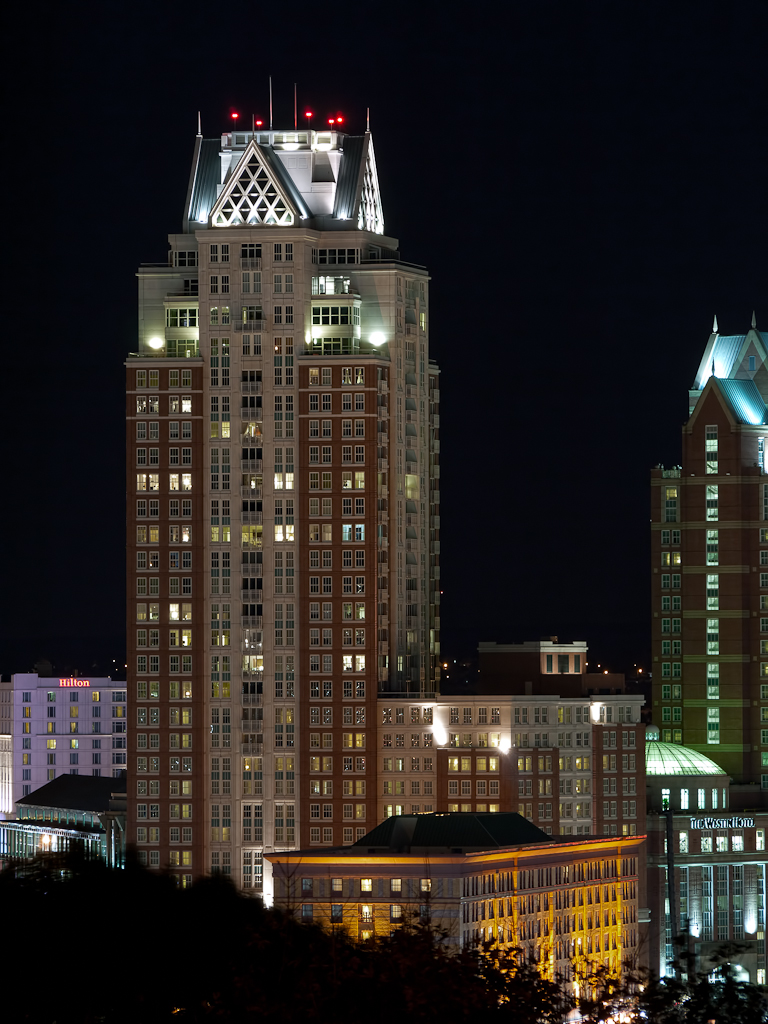
The building at night.
