= Video Game Orchestra =

American video game music orchestra

- Origin: Boston, Massachusetts, U.S.
- Genres: VGM, progressive rock, symphonic rock, neoclassical metal, contemporary classical music
- Years active: 2008–present
- Label: Materia Collective
- Website: vgo-online.com

Video Game Orchestra (VGO) is a Boston-based project that performs its own "rockestral" arrangements of video game music with a rock band, vocals, and orchestra. The project was created by Shota Nakama, a Boston-based producer from Okinawa, Japan. Comparative to the other existing major video game concert acts, which mostly focus on the pure orchestral performances, the rock band element is the core essence of the VGO. Their concerts are presented as a rock show with entertaining audience engagement and improvised solos.

== History ==
=== Formation and debut ===
Video Game Orchestra was founded by Shota Nakama, a graduate from Berklee College of Music and The Boston Conservatory, in May 2008.

VGO became comprised by a group of Boston-based professional musicians, assembled by Shota himself. His own intentions with the group was to deliver something very different and fresh to the world. VGO's debut concert, A Night of Symphonic Video Game Music, was held at Gordon Chapel in Old South Church in Boston on July 2, 2008. The orchestra, or rather a small ensemble of 28 musicians including Shota himself playing the guitar, performed the music from popular titles such as Final Fantasy, Chrono Trigger, Chrono Cross, Legend of Mana, and Metal Gear Solid. Their second concert was held at Church of the Covenant of Boston on November 2, 2008, which also saw the addition of a full rock band and choir.

=== The ensemble ===
Video Games Orchestra comprises a group of musicians, both young and established talents from local communities, as well as talents from around the world. Featuring a rock band consisting of drums, two guitars, bass, keyboards, percussion, violin soloist and one/two vocalist led by Shota Nakama.

The band is usually accompanied by a string section or orchestra. Regular members performers of the orchestra include; During international shows, VGO frequently features local talents as special guests and ensembles for the performances. For instance the Kumamoto Orchestra during their Capcom Live show at Kyushu and a local China Jazz horn section during ChinaJoy.

=== 2009 ===
VGO's concert on March 5 at the Berklee Performance Center was sold out and became a landmark for Berklee College of Music by being the first concert of its kind that the school participated in. In attendance were four of America's most prolific video game composers, Jack Wall, Gerard Marino, Duncan Watt, and Keith Zizza with Wall conducting his own compositions with the VGO. It received heavy promotion and the orchestra was featured on NECN News, Boston Globe, and numerous other papers, radio stations, and websites around the world.

On May 7, 2009, Independent Game Conference hosted VGO as its closing event and was held at Fenway Center in Boston. This concert featured the VGO chamber group outfit for the first time in a very intimate acoustic setting.

The group was asked to perform at Anime Boston as the opening act for the main musical guest, Kalafina and Yuki Kajiura. The concert was held at Hynes Convention Center Auditorium on May 23, 2009. VGO featured its chamber group along with the rock band. To honor the presence of Yuki Kajiura, they included an Anime song from Tsubasa Chronicle that Kajiura composed in their set list. VGO also had a special appearance at the end of the Music for Video Games workshop at Berklee College of Music. Norihiko Hibino, a composer from the Metal Gear Solid franchise, attended the concert.

After a year of experimenting with different performance styles, the VGO decided to return to their full orchestra size for their big show in their home town of Boston. The concert entitled ~Awakening~ was held at the Berklee Performance Center and took place on December 5, 2009. ~Awakening~ featured an accomplished film/game composer, Wataru Hokoyama.

=== 2010 ===
During PAX East 2010 at Hynes Convention Center in March 2010, VGO was featured as one of seven musical guests, performing alongside more visible and tenured performers such as Jonathan Coulton and the Protomen. Starting the proceedings on the first day of concerts, their performance was hailed as the best of the night. Capped with a standing ovation and incessant chants. The show was so successful that PAX East has invited the group back each year since.

VGO returned for Anime Boston at Hynes Convention Center on April 2, 2010, this time with its full group unlike the previous year. The convention guest of honor, Nobuo Uematsu, had a surprise appearance on One Winged Angel during the encore, marking one of the first times the famous composer has performed alongside a video game cover band.

=== 2011 and breakthrough ===
During 2011, VGO reached another milestone by performing at the Boston Symphony Hall which marked the first time that video game music was featured as a main draw in the venue. The show was titled Back to the Future ~Rockestral Renditions of Timeless Video Game and Film Music~ and sold out all tickets within only days, and was attended by music industry legends such as Alan Silvestri and Howard Shore. The show was a monumental success, and gained VGO nationwide coverage and high praise from the music communities.

The group spent the rest of the year touring conventions and video game festivals, including making their first appearance at PAX Prime in Seattle on January 13, 2011.

Announced in November 2011, VGO was selected to perform for Distant Worlds for a March 10, 2012, Concert.

=== 2012: Distant Worlds, Kickstarter and China Tour ===
After Nakama appeared as a special guest during a concert in Pittsburgh on February 25, VGO was personally selected by conductor Arnie Roth as the orchestra to perform the world touring Distant Worlds program on their tour stop in Boston, officially sanctioned by Square Enix and based on the legendary Final Fantasy video game franchise. The concert was held on March 10 in Boston Symphony Hall, and gained high praise and sold out within mere days of tickets being put on sale.

After several convention shows, a new concert was announced in August titled ~Live At Symphony Hall~, and would see VGO return to Boston Symphony Hall after their success with Distant Worlds. Uniquely, a Kickstarter campaign was launched at the same time as the concert was announced in order to fund an official live recording album, to be released in Spring of 2013. Setting the goal amount at $30,000, the campaign would in the end go past the projected end sum and raise over $37,000.

~Live At Symphony Hall~ was held on October 7. The event was sold out, and in attendance was 4 of Japan's most prolific names in the video game music industry, Kinuyo Yamashita, Yoko Shimomura, Noriyuki Iwadare, and Hitoshi Sakimoto. Each composer was honored by a piece based on their works, including the first time music from the game Grandia was performed live by an orchestra outside Japan. The concert saw a large amount of international media and attention, including being featured on the Japanese television network NHK for their El Mundo program, as well as a large interview in Asahi Shimbun.

Building on their success from ~Live At Symphony Hall~, VGO embarked on their first international tour, doing a 4 show tour in China. The tour marked the first time a video game based music act has toured China, and drew over 9,000 attendees.

=== 2013: Lightning Returns: Final Fantasy XIII ===
Riding off the success of their performances at Distant Worlds and the many PAXs they've attended, VGO was invited as a special guest for the 11th iteration of MagFest, playing alongside nerdcore stalwarts Brentalfloss and Powerglove. MagFest XI took place in the Gaylord National Resort & Convention Center from January 3–6, 2013.

VGO developed new acoustic style show was created uniquely for U-CON, held at the UCONN Student Union on February 16, featuring all new arrangements of many of their most popular songs from their repertoire. In March 2013, VGO once again headlined PAX East.

On June 12 at E3, Square Enix, Video Game Orchestra and Masashi Hamauzu jointly announced their partnership for the game Lightning Returns: Final Fantasy XIII. VGO producer Shota Nakama was tasked to orchestrate Hamauzu's compositions for the game, and the orchestrated performances were recorded in VGO's studios in Boston, MA.

=== 2016: Capcom Live ===
In 2016, Video Games Orchestra performed the official Capcom live starting with Oita to Kumamoto then Fukuoka ending in Okinawa. Following that, the group by a local interviewed by a local TV programme which was broadcast all over Japan.

=== 2018: VGO X Final Fantasy XV ===
During this year, Video Games Orchestra performed at the notable events in the United States such as Anime Boston and PAX East 2018. During PAX East 2018, Video Games Orchestra collaborated with Final Fantasy XV in performing legendary pieces from the game soundtrack. Later that year, VGO performed in China's biggest gaming event Chinajoy alongside a group of local talented horn section.

=== 2019: International Tour ===
By this time, Video Games Orchestra has taken the world by storm and has expanded their tour to various parts of the world in events such as Brasil Game Show held at São Paulo, Thailand Game Show at Bangkok and Level Up KL in Kuala Lumpur.

=== 2020: Going Full Online ===
Due to the pandemic COVID-19 which struck the world, Video Games Orchestra has taken the first step and performed their first ever show online performing directly to fans all over the world.

== Live at Symphony Hall + Kickstarter ==
The most notable work of Video Games Orchestra has been their ~Live At Symphony Hall~ which would see VGO return to Boston Symphony Hall after their success with Distant Worlds. The show held at Boston Symphony Hall, which was quickly sold out, featured music from famous games the most notable being Chrono Trigger and God of War amongst other noteworthy titles. The concert saw a large amount of international media and attention, including being featured on the Japanese television network NHK for their El Mundo program, as well as a large interview in Asahi Shimbun.

At the same time, a Kickstarter campaign was launched to fund an official live recording album, which was released in Spring of 2013. Setting the goal amount at $30,000, the campaign would in the end go past the projected end sum and raise over $37,000.

The music of Video Games Orchestra Live at Symphony Hall can be found on Bandcamp, YouTube, Spotify, Amazon Music among other streaming services and sites

== Social media and Youtube ==
Video Games Orchestra frequently interacts with fans all over the world and makes announcements on their Facebook, Instagram and Twitter. VGO's VGOonline YouTube Channel has been active from 2012 with videos of their live shows.

== Discography ==
- Rockestral Game Music - Independent, promotional release (September 2011)
- ~Live at Symphony Hall~ - Kickstarter-funded, live album (April 2013)
- Live in Brazil - live album (October 2021)
