= Razzle Dazzle (disambiguation) =

Razzle Dazzle is a Canadian children's program produced between 1961 and 1966.

Razzle Dazzle may also refer to:

== Film and television ==
- Razzledazzle, a BBC television programme for children
- Razzle Dazzle: A Journey into Dance, a 2007 Australian film by Darren Ashton
- Razzle Dazzle, a 2008 documentary film and live one-woman show about Mitzi Gaynor
- The Hudson Brothers Razzle Dazzle Show, a mid-1970s television show starring the Hudson Brothers

== Music ==
- Razzle Dazzle (album), a 2010 album by Buck-Tick
- "Razzle Dazzle", a song from the 1975 musical Chicago
- "Razzle Dazzle", a song by Deep Purple from Bananas
- "Razzle-Dazzle", a 1955 rock and roll song released by Bill Haley & His Comets
- "Razzle Dazzle Rose", a song by Camera Obscura from Let's Get Out of This Country
- "Razzle Dazzle", a song by Future from Mike WiLL Made-It's album Ransom 2

== Other uses ==
- Razzle Dazzle (software), a screensaver for DOS and Microsoft Windows
- Dazzle camouflage (aka razzle dazzle), a camouflage paint scheme used on ships, mainly during World War I
- Razzle (game) or Razzle Dazzle, a carnival game
- Razzle Dazzle, a ship once owned by Jack London
- Razzle Dazzle, an attraction at the Hollycombe Steam Collection in Hampshire, England
