= Amica Mutual Insurance =

Rhode Island-based company

- Type: Mutual
- Industry: Insurance
- Founded: 1907
- Headquarters: Lincoln, Rhode Island, United States
- Key people: Edmund Shallcross III, President and CEO
- Number of employees: 3,781 (2019)
- Website: www.amica.com

Amica Mutual Insurance Company is a Rhode Island–based mutual insurance company that offers auto, home and life insurance.

Amica was founded as the Automobile Mutual Insurance Company of America by A.T. Vigneron in 1907 and originally offered auto, fire and theft insurance. Since then, Amica has expanded to offering auto, home and life insurance, as well as owning a number of subsidiary insurance companies. It is the oldest mutual insurer of automobiles in the United States.

== History ==
Originally named the Automobile Mutual Insurance Company of America, Amica was founded in 1907 by A.T. Vigneron in Providence, Rhode Island. Amica was organized as a mutual insurance company, meaning that company was owned by policyholders rather than stockholders.

In 1941, Amica opened its first branch office in Boston, Massachusetts, and now has 44 locations nationwide. The company added homeowners’ insurance in 1956, and later added marine and umbrella insurance.

In 1994, Amica's corporate office moved from Providence, Rhode Island, to a larger campus in nearby Lincoln.

In 2007, Amica celebrated its 100th year of business.

In 2022, Amica replaced Dunkin' Donuts as the sponsor of the Amica Mutual Pavilion in Providence.

In 2024, Amica became the official patch sponsor of the Boston Celtics.

== Subsidiaries ==
- Amica Mutual Insurance Company
- Amica Life Insurance Company
- Amica Property and Casualty Insurance Company
- Amica General Agency, LLC

== Company Involvement ==
"CEO Challenge" is an annual campaign that benefits ALS United Rhode Island to provide support for individual and families impacted by the disease.

== See Also ==
List of United States Insurance Companies
