= Anime Boston =

Anime convention in Boston

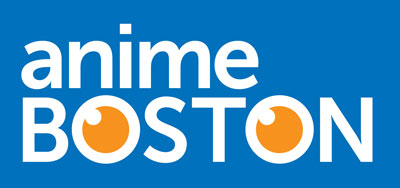
- Status: Active
- Venue: Hynes Convention Center and Sheraton Boston Hotel
- Location: Boston, Massachusetts
- Country: United States
- Inaugurated: 2003
- Attendance: 25,615 in 2019
- Organizer: New England Anime Society
- Website: www.animeboston.com

Anime Boston is an annual three-day anime fan convention held in the spring in Boston, Massachusetts, United States. Anime Boston was created and is run by the New England Anime Society, Inc., a Massachusetts-based non-profit organization.

== Programming ==
The convention features several events which include a masquerade, an anime music video contest, video programming rooms, an artists' alley and art show, karaoke, game shows, swap meets, Anime Unscripted, video games, RPGs, and a LARP.

== History ==
Cosplayers at Anime Boston 2004

The first Anime Boston was held in 2003 at the Boston Park Plaza, as was the 2004 convention. By Anime Boston 2005, the convention had moved to the Hynes Convention Center and Sheraton Boston Hotel. Since then, the convention has continued to be held at the convention center and adjoining hotels, with attendance seeing steady growth to 14,339 people (or 35,224 turnstile) in 2008. That year also saw Japanese rock stars The Pillows finish up the east coast leg of their American tour at Anime Boston. In 2009, the convention saw the attendance rise to over 15,000 people for the first time, and the attendees who got tickets at the convention for the concert got to see Kalafina for their first-ever North American performance. Attendance jumped again to over 17,000 attendants in 2010. Nobuo Uematsu made an appearance at the convention with the Video Game Orchestra, a Boston-based 90-piece orchestra that performs video game music with an orchestra, choir, and rock band.

In 2011, the Boston Phoenix selected Anime Boston as the city's "Best Nerd Gathering", beating out contenders such as New England Comic Con and PAX East. The convention won the award again in 2012. In 2012, Anime Boston celebrated its tenth year. In addition to its events, a museum of the convention's history was displayed; photographs and memorabilia such as mascot costumes and previous t-shirt designs, from each of the past years, created the museum's exhibits; some of Anime Boston’s guests from previous years also submitted letters of congratulations. Held on the weekend of Easter, the event drew over 20,000 attendees.. An attendance cap was announced for weekend memberships for the 2015 convention due to overcrowding concerns, despite this AB plans on being at the Hynes Convention Center through 2026. Anime Boston 2020 and 2021 were cancelled due to the COVID-19 pandemic. Anime Boston returned as an in-person event in 2022, although with fewer guests present. Since 2024, Japanese guest signings have been exclusive to a lottery, which is held before the convention.

== Event history ==
=== 2003–2022 ===
Since 2005, Anime Boston has been held at the Hynes Convention Center. The 2003 and 2004 events were held at the Boston Park Plaza.

Dates	Atten.	Guests
April 18–20, 2003	4,110	John Barrett, Steve Bennett, Chris Beveridge, Jerry Chu, Ted Cole, Emily DeJesus, Robert DeJesus, Tiffany Grant, Mark Hildreth, Charlene Ingram, Hiroki Kanno, Mark C. MacKinnon, Jamie McGonnigal, Scott McNeil, Kirby Morrow, Kristen Nelson, Lorraine Savage, Brad Swaile, and David L. Williams.
April 9–11, 2004	3,656	Michael Coleman, Emily DeJesus, Robert DeJesus, Crispin Freeman, Lauren Goodnight, Hilary Haag, Carl Gustav Horn, Lex Lang, Monica Rial, David L. Williams, and Dave Wittenberg.
April 29 – May 1, 2005	7,500	Greg Ayres, Johnny Yong Bosch, Tim Buckley, Svetlana Chmakova, Emily DeJesus, Mohammad "Hawk" Haque, Dan Hess, Melissa Fahn, Yoko Ishida, David Kaye, Dave Lister, Cynthia Martinez, Scott McNeil, Daisuke Moriyama, Ananth Panagariya, Chris Patton, Monica Rial, Brianne Siddall, Michael "Mookie" Terracciano, and Dave Wittenberg.
May 26–28, 2006	9,354	Greg Ayres, Christopher Bevins, Steve Blum, Svetlana Chmakova, Emily DeJesus, Robert DeJesus, Richard Epcar, Shuzilow.HA, Clarine Harp, Mohammad "Hawk" Haque, Jonathan Klein, Mary Elizabeth McGlynn, Vic Mignogna, Ananth Panagariya, Carrie Savage, Sumi Shimamoto, Michael Sinterniklaas, Michael "Mookie" Terracciano, Kari Wahlgren, Tom Wayland, and David L. Williams.
April 20–22, 2007	11,500	Greg Ayres, Laura Bailey, Troy Baker, Christopher Bevins, Luci Christian, Colleen Clinkenbeard, Robert DeJesus, Emily DeJesus, Yasuhiro Imagawa, Hiroshi Iwata, Bettina M. Kurkoski, Mike McFarland, Grant Moran, Junji Nishimura, Brina Palencia, Michael Sinterniklaas, Kenji Terada, Tom Wayland, David L. Williams, and Travis Willingham.
March 21–23, 2008	14,339	Christopher Ayres, Greg Ayres, Colleen Clinkenbeard, Emily DeJesus, Robert DeJesus, Aaron Dismuke, Todd Haberkorn, Luv and Response, MC Frontalot, The Pillows, Monica Rial, Michael Sinterniklaas, Brad Swaile, Tokyo Pinsalocks, Tom Wayland, and David L. Williams.
May 22–24, 2009	15,438	Christopher Ayres, Greg Ayres, Laura Bailey, Troy Baker, Bespa Kumamero, Video Game Orchestra, Emily DeJesus, Robert DeJesus, Yuki Kajiura, Kalafina, Misako Rocks!, Veronica Taylor, Tom Wayland, David L. Williams, and Travis Willingham
April 2–4, 2010	17,236	Christopher Ayres, Greg Ayres, Emily DeJesus, Jessie James Grelle, Clarine Harp, Reni Mimura, Carli Mosier, MyM, Christopher Corey Smith, J. Michael Tatum, Nobuo Uematsu, Video Game Orchestra, and Tom Wayland.
April 22–24, 2011	19,136	Mari Iijima, Girugamesh, STEREOPONY, Brina Palencia, Greg Ayres, Christopher Ayres, J. Michael Tatum, Richard Epcar, Sean Schemmel, Spike Spencer, Trina Nishimura, Tom Wayland, MC Frontalot
April 6–8, 2012	22,065	Christopher Ayres, Greg Ayres, Caitlin Glass, Kanako Ito, Shotaro Kaizuka, MINT, Haruko Momoi, Carli Mosier, Tsutomu Narita, Takamasa Sakurai, Keith Silverstein, Michael Sinterniklaas, Christopher Corey Smith, Karen Strassman, Dethklan, Yoshitaka Suzuki, Kirk Thornton, Tom Wayland
May 24–26, 2013	21,825	Christopher Ayres, Greg Ayres, Zach Bolton, Christopher Bevins, IBI, Tomohiko Ito, Shinichiro Kashiwada, Yasuhiro Koshi, Lauren Landa, Cherami Leigh, David Matranga, ORIGA, Bryce Papenbrook, Raj Ramayya, Dethklan, Monica Rial, Rachel Robinson, Stephanie Sheh, Micah Solusod, Yousei Teikoku, Kari Wahlgren, Shinichi Watanabe, Tom Wayland
March 21–23, 2014	24,798	Yuu Asakawa, Greg Ayres, Linda Ballantyne, Jessie James Grelle, Kyle Hebert, Wendee Lee, Toby Proctor, JAM Project, Mike McFarland, Matthew Mercer, Dethklan, Yuko Minaguchi, Trina Nishimura, Dai Satō, Patrick Seitz, John Stocker, Cristina Vee, Tom Wayland
April 3–5, 2015	26,475	Greg Ayres, Christine Marie Cabanos, Richard Epcar, Kazuhiro Furuhashi, Lauren Landa, Cherami Leigh, LiSA, Manami Matsumae, Mona Marshall, Cassandra Lee Morris, Haruo Nakajima, Yoko Shimomura, Michael Sinterniklaas, Ellyn Stern, Akira Takarada, Koki Uchiyama, ~~Tom Wayland~~ (Cancelled)
March 25–27, 2016	26,975	Yukiko Aikei, ALI PROJECT, Greg Ayres, Toshio Furukawa, Todd Haberkorn, Kyōhei Ishiguro, Shino Kakinuma, Carrie Keranen, Erica Lindbeck, Masao Maruyama, Max Mittelman, Tony Oliver, Monica Rial, Nano Ripe, Patrick Seitz, Eric Vale, Hiromi Wakabayashi
Mar. 31 – Apr. 2, 2017	25,848	Greg Ayres, Bryson Baugus, Johnny Yong Bosch, Robbie Daymond, Sandy Fox, Toru Furuya, Kyle Jones, Hirokatsu Kihara, Roland Kelts, Lex Lang, Cherami Leigh, Masahiko Minami, Shingo Natsume, Lisa Ortiz, Okamoto's, Wakana Okamura, Brina Palencia, Puffy AmiYumi, Michelle Ruff, Christopher Sabat, Patrick Seitz, LeSean Thomas, Naokatsu Tsuda
Mar. 30 – Apr. 1, 2018	25,229	Asaka, Greg Ayres, Christopher Bevins, Flow, Jessie James Grelle, Hirokatsu Kihara, Bennett Abara, Yuji Muto, Monica Rial, Rachel Robinson, Katsuyuki Sumisawa, Michihiko Suwa, Kaiji Tang, J. Michael Tatum, Hideyuki Tomioka, Kaoru Wada, Kazuki Yao.
April 19–21, 2019	25,615	Greg Ayres, Johnny Yong Bosch, Leah Clark, Kara Edwards Richard Epcar, Billy Kametz, Yoichi Kato, Kenji Kodama, Yuri Lowenthal, MIYAVI, Naohiro Ogata, Lisa Ortiz, Tara Platt, ~~Michelle Ruff~~ (Cancelled), Tara Sands, Yoko Shimomura, Ellyn Stern, Goh Wakabayashi
~~April 10–12, 2020~~	Cancelled	None
~~April 2-4, 2021~~	Cancelled	None
May 27–29, 2022	29,849	ASCA, Greg Ayres, Griffin Burns, Ray Chase, Robbie Daymond, EyeQ, Lauren Landa, Brittany Lauda, Kayli Mills, Max Mittelman, Matt Shipman, ~~Keith Silverstein~~ (Cancelled), Suzie Yeung

=== 2023– ===
The following is a partial list of guests who have attended Anime Boston since 2023. New categories of guests such as "Hololive" were added which were later replaced by "Vtubers", and Japanese guest signings have been subject to a lottery since 2024.

Dates	Atten.	Guests
April 7–9, 2023	TBA	Voice acting: Greg Ayres, Dante Basco, Christine Marie Cabanos, Adam Gibbs, Erika Harlacher, Christina Kelly, Jason Liebrecht, Emi Lo, Brandon McInnis, Sarah Natochenny, Keith Silverstein, John Swasey, J. Michael Tatum, Annie Wild Industry: Quinn Lord, Eric McEver; Musical: Paranom and Aztech; Hololive: Hakos Baelz, Magni Dezmond, Shirakami Fubuki, Kobo Kanaeru, Takanashi Kiara, Ayunda Risu, Noir Vesper Panelists: Zack Davisson, Helen McCarthy, Neil Nadelman, Sarah Hodge-Wetherbe, Viga
March 29–31, 2024	TBA	Japanese: Yuya Hirose, Yuki Watanabe, Yukana Voice acting: Greg Ayres, Kira Buckland, Hayden Daviau, Maile Flanagan, Alyssa Marek, Kristen McGuire, Casey Mongillo, Natalie Rial, Zeno Robinson, Michelle Ruff, Alejandro Saab, Jack Stansbury, Cristina Vee; Industry: Shannon D. Reed, Kaho Shibuya; Musical: Babybeard, Hizaki, Kaya, Lotus Juice, Queen Bee, Raj Ramayya Hololive: Gavis Bettel, Koseki Bijou, Banzoin Hakka, Moona Hoshinova, IRyS, Shiori Novella, Nerissa Ravencroft, Tsunomaki Watame
May 23–25, 2025	TBA	Japanese: Kana Ichinose, Hirokatsu Kihara, Yuriko Yamaguchi Voice acting: Greg Ayres, Bryson Baugus, AJ Beckles, Steve Blum, Caitlin Glass, Jill Harris, Anjali Kunapaneni, Anairis Quiñones, ~~Dallas Reid~~ (Cancelled), Juliet Simmons, Kaiji Tang, Kirk Thornton, Kari Wahlgren; Musical: BLUE ENCOUNT, Magnificent Danger, Reol Vtubers: Fuwawa Abyssgard, Mococo Abyssgard, Hakos Baelz, Elizabeth Rose Bloodflame, Cecilia Immergreen, Ironmouse, Gigi Murin, Raora Panthera
April 3–5, 2026	TBA	Japanese: Atsushi Abe, Kujira, Wakana Maruoka Voice acting: Zach Aguilar, Greg Ayres, Aaron Dismuke, Ricco Fajardo, Daman Mills, Xander Mobus, Monica Rial, Jonah Scott, Blake Shepard, Laura Stahl, Sarah Wiedenheft, Mark Whitten, Joshua Waters; Industry: Hiromi Sueta, Katsura Sunshine, Natsu Hyūga and Uririn, Takanori Matsuoka; Musical: Coda, Yoko Kanno, Spirit Bomb Vtubers: Koseki Bijou, Ninomae Ina'nis, IRyS, Nerissa Ravencroft, Vestia Zeta
May 28–30, 2027	TBA	TBA
May 26–28, 2028	TBA	TBA

== Mascots ==
The mascots for Anime Boston are A-chan and B-kun. A-chan has long blue hair and she typically wears a dress. B-kun has orange hair and red eyes. Their outfits often change to match the convention's theme for the year. In recent years, a third character known as Infobot can be seen with the duo.

== See also ==
- New England Anime Society
- List of anime conventions
