= The Cruise of the Dazzler =

1902 novel written by Jack London

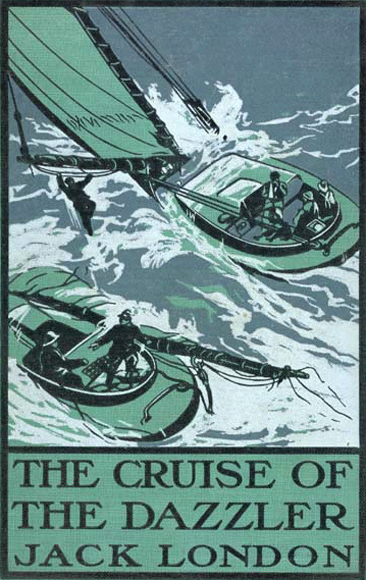
- Author: Jack London
- Language: English
- Genre: Adventure novel
- Publication date: 1902
- Publication place: United States
- Media type: Print

The Cruise of the Dazzler is an early novel by Jack London, set in his home city of San Francisco. It is considered a boy's adventure novel.

In the novel, Joe Bronson, dissatisfied with his dull life at school, runs away and joins the crew of a sloop he sees in San Francisco Bay. He finds the captain is involved in criminal activities.

The nautical activities on board a sailing boat are authentically described, and there are convincing descriptions of boats enduring stormy weather at sea.

== Background ==
London, in his autobiographical novel John Barleycorn, describes how in his youth he bought a sloop called the Razzle Dazzle from an oyster pirate called French Frank. In The Cruise of the Dazzler, the captain of the Dazzler is known as French Pete, who, like French Frank, drinks to the success of business ventures. London himself became an oyster pirate.

== Story summary ==
Joe Bronson, instead of studying for a school exam, goes to buy kites with his friends; on their way back he gets involved in fights with gang members in a poor part of the city. After he fails the exam the next day, he walks out of school and takes a ferry across the bay to Oakland. Looking at the boats on the wharf, he imagines the exciting life on a boat.

His father, a businessman, has a liberal attitude to his son; but, critical of his recent behavior and a poor school report, tells him that he might send him to a military academy. Joe later leaves a farewell note for his family; returning to Oakland, he joins the crew of a sloop, the Dazzler. The captain Pete Le Maire is known as "French Pete", and the one other crew member is 'Frisco Kid, a boy of about Joe's age.

He soon realizes that French Pete is involved in criminal activity. They take scrap iron from a factory; the job is abandoned when shots are fired. Later, they work as oyster pirates.

Joe, not wanting to be involved in crime, tries to escape, but each time is thwarted. French Pete tolerates Joe's opinion of him that he is a criminal. 'Frisco Kid tells Joe that he hates his life at sea; he had no family, and once worked for Red Nelson on another sloop, the Reindeer, but ran away. Arrested as a tramp, he was sent to a "boy's refuge", where conditions were intolerable; he escaped and joined French Pete. Joe resolves to leave and take 'Frisco Kid with him.

French Pete and his associate Red Nelson steal a safe. Joe sees that it belongs to his father's company. The Dazzler and Reindeer sail into the Pacific, pursued for a time by a yacht; they intend to sail to Mexico. There is soon a storm and the Dazzler's mast breaks. The Reindeer gets close enough for French Pete to jump onto it but, before the boys can follow, the Reindeer disappears under the waves.

The Dazzler drifts ashore at Santa Cruz, finding a small wharf on the lower San Lorenzo River. Joe goes to his father's office. His father makes him "feel at once as if not the slightest thing uncommon had occurred. It seemed as if he had just returned from a vacation, or, man-grown, had come back from some business trip." His father, after hearing his story, says that the $5000 reward for the return of the safe would be shared, 'Frisco Kid's half being held in trust for his future.
