= Rhode Island Convention Center =

Convention Center in Providence, Rhode Island

Coordinates: 41°49′28.4″N 71°24′57.6″W

- RICC
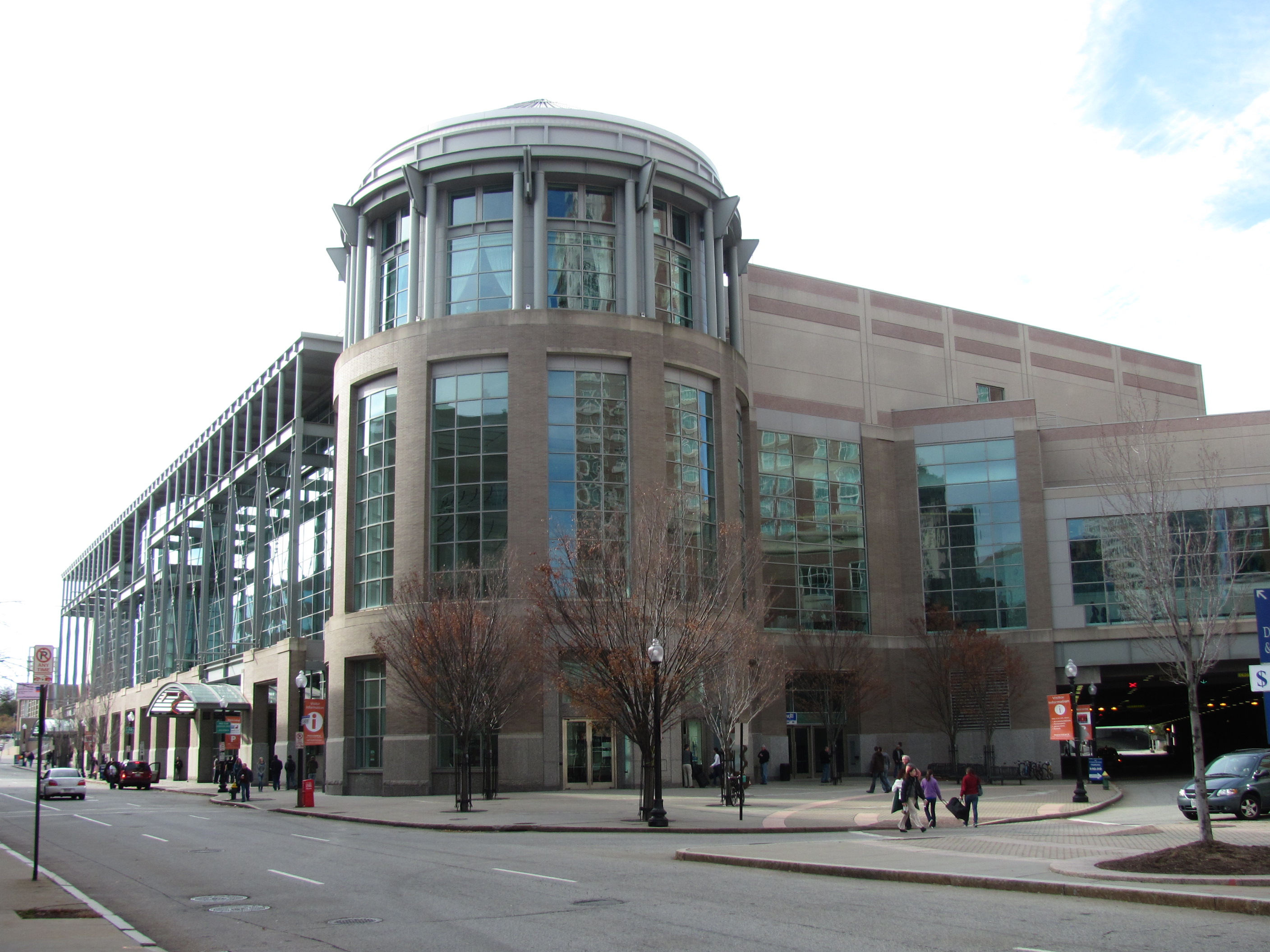
- Interactive map of Rhode Island Convention Center
- Location: 1 Sabin St, Providence, RI (Rhode Island Convention & Entertainment Complex)
- Owner: Rhode Island Convention Center Authority
- Operator: ASM Global

Construction
- Opened: November 24, 1993
- Architect: HNTB

Website
- www.riconvention.com

The Rhode Island Convention Center is an exposition center in downtown Providence, RI. Opened in 1993, it is the largest convention center in Rhode Island, with about 130,000 square feet (12,000 m^{2}) of exhibition space, including a 100,000-square-foot (9,300 m^{2}) exhibit hall. It is connected by skybridges to the Amica Mutual Pavilion, and the adjacent Omni Hotels Omni Providence Hotel (formerly The Westin). The ground level features a main exhibition hall with 100,000 square feet, and the upper level has a ballroom and meeting halls. The building has a five-story glass front with a large space outside the meeting rooms and exhibit halls where visitors can gather and mingle. The center is operated by the Rhode Island Convention Center Authority, which also operates the Amica Mutual Pavilion and Veterans Memorial Auditorium.

== History ==
=== Background ===
As far back as 1958, plans had been put forward to build a convention center. A 1970 planning document had included a civic and convention center, but when the Civic Center was built in 1973, convention and exhibition space was not included for cost reasons. The idea was revived in the late 1980s, and a Convention Center Authority was established in 1987 to look into the feasibility of building a convention center along with hotel and parking garage. In 1991, Governor Bruce Sundlun put his full support into the project, making it the centerpiece of a large state-funded construction project to revitalize Providence's downtown. His plan also included relocating the railroad, and building Waterplace Park and walkways along the city's rivers. Sundlun argued that a convention center would attract tourists and become an economic engine for the state.

=== Construction ===
The Convention Center Authority purchased the Bonanza Bus Station and two parking lots to provide land. The bus station was demolished to make room for the Convention Center.

Construction on the Center proceeded rapidly, despite the land being unstable; the site had been the location of the Great Salt Cove, which meant that pilings had to be driven deeper than originally anticipated. Despite this, the project opened on schedule. The north parking garage finished January 1993; the Convention Center and south garage were completed November 1993. The center held its ribbon cutting ceremony on November 24, 1993.

The adjacent Westin Hotel (now Omni Providence Hotel) was completed in December 1994.

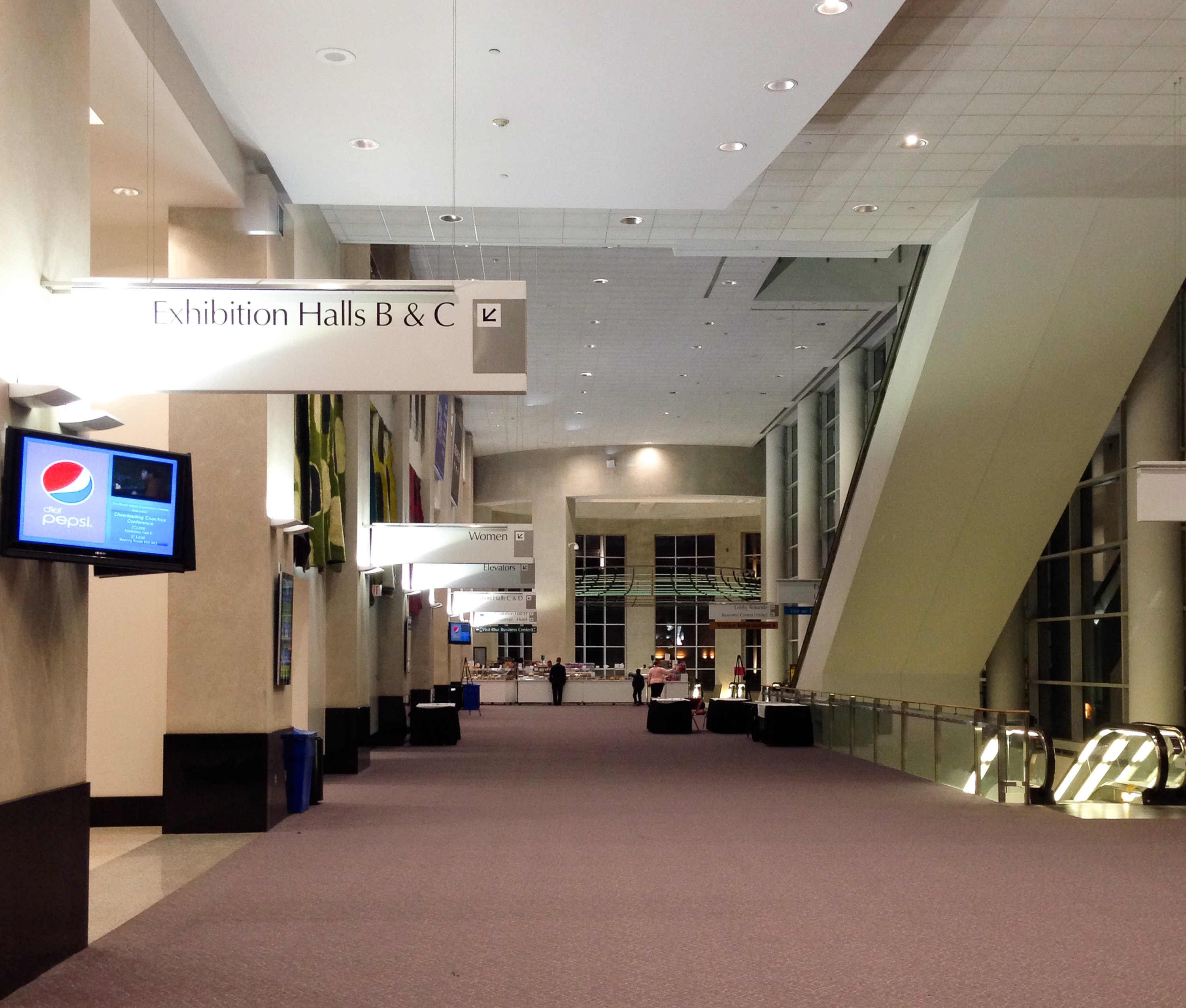
Rhode Island Convention Center 2nd floor

=== 21st Century ===
In 2017, the Convention Center hosted 242 events. It made an operating profit of $800,000, which is an unusually high revenue for a convention center. However, as of 2018 the state still pays $15 million per year to pay off the initial construction bonds. The Center is operated by the Rhode Island Convention Center Authority, which also operates the Dunkin’ Donuts Center and Veterans Memorial Auditorium.

==== COVID-19 pandemic ====
The COVID-19 pandemic of 2020-2021 resulted in the cancellation of most of the shows and concerts normally hosted by the convention center, including the Rhode Island Comic Con (a major draw). The state of Rhode Island paid to rent the facility for emergency measures; the main exhibition space was utilized for a COVID field hospital, and the garages became the home for a testing laboratory and drive-through testing site. This role enabled the center to remain profitable despite the decline in normal programming.

==== Proposed Name Change ====
On June 30, 2022, the naming rights to the Dunkin' Donuts Center officially expired after 21 years. On September 6, 2022, it was announced that Lincoln, Rhode Island based Amica Mutual Insurance purchased the naming rights, opting to rename the arena to the Amica Mutual Pavilion. Although Amica was also awarded the rights to rename the convention center as part of the new deal, the company ultimately chose to keep the facility's current name.

== Events ==
The Convention Center hosts nearly 250 events each year. Examples include the Rhode Island Comic Con, dance competitions, and trade shows such as the Northeastern Retail Lumber Association Expo, the New England Regional Turfgrass Foundation, the Providence Boat Show, the Baby Show, and the Business Expo.

== See also ==
- Amica Mutual Pavilion
