= Omni Providence Hotel =

Hotel in Providence, Rhode Island

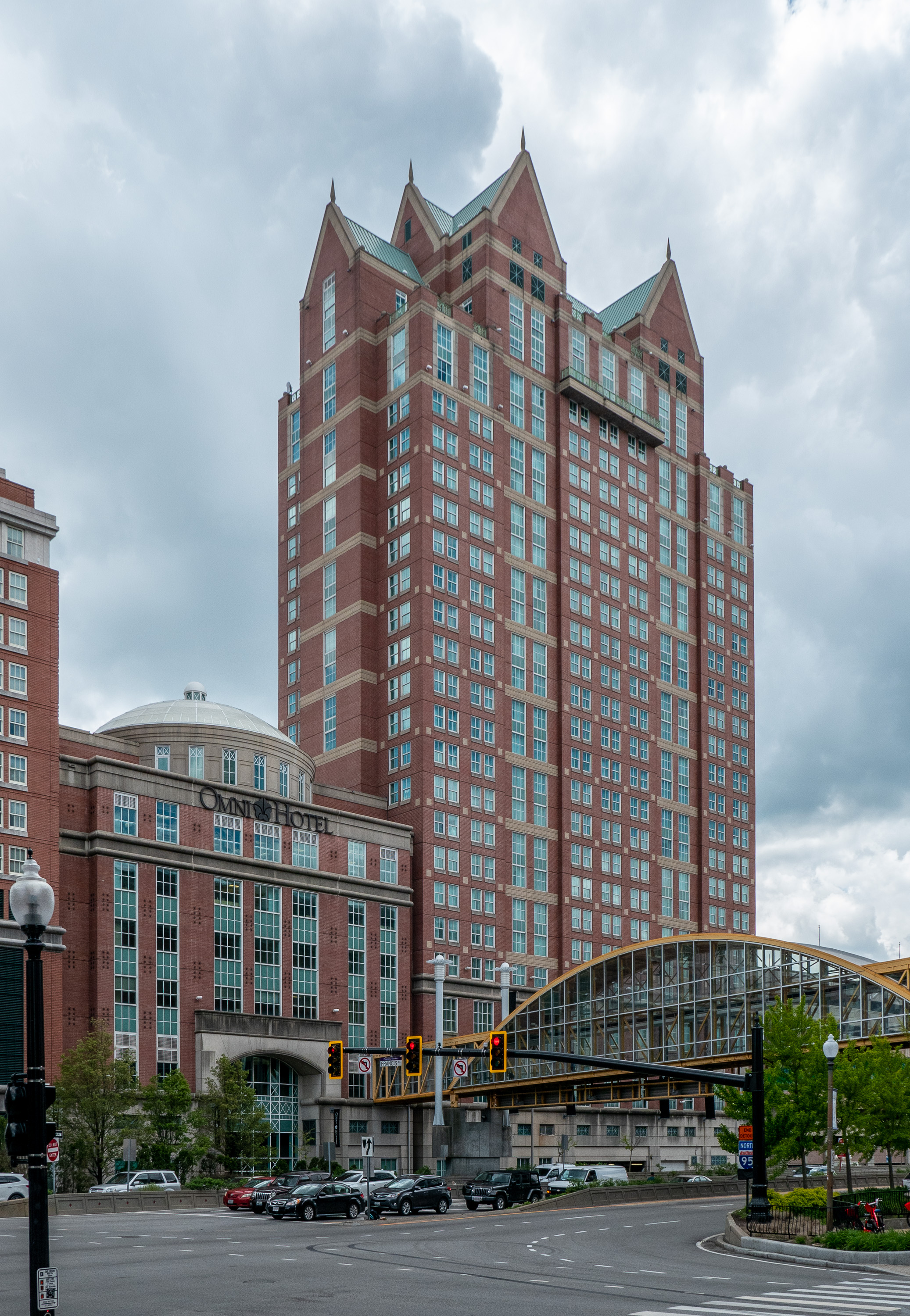
- Interactive map of the Omni Providence Hotel area
- Former names: Westin Hotel
- Hotel chain: Omni Hotels

General information
- Location: United States, 1 West Exchange Street; Providence, Rhode Island
- Coordinates: 41.8253°N 71.4162°W
- Opening: December 1, 1994
- Owner: Omni Hotels
- Operator: Omni Hotels

Height
- Height: 100.3 m (329 ft)

Technical details
- Floor count: 25

Design and construction
- Architects: Nichols Brosch Sandoval & Associates, Inc.

Other information
- Number of rooms: 564
- Number of restaurants: Café Gusto; Centro; Flemings Prime Steakhouse and Wine Bar

The Omni Providence Hotel (formerly The Westin Providence) is a Neo-Traditionalist skyscraper in downtown Providence, Rhode Island. At 328 ft (100 m), it is the fourth-tallest building in the city and the state, being 52 ft (16 m) shorten than The Residences Providence that neighbors the building. Brick facades and a pitched roof adorn the building.

With the completion of the Residences tower, that added 200 rooms, the Omni Providence now boasts 564 rooms, and is still the tallest and largest hotel in Providence, having usurped the title from the 1922 Providence Biltmore upon completion.

== History ==
The Westin Providence was completed with 364 beds in December 1994 as part of a larger construction project which included the Rhode Island Convention Center and two parking garages. The hotel held its first gala in January 1995.

The hotel was sold to Omni Hotels & Resorts in October 2012 and was converted to the Omni Providence Hotel on January 15, 2013.

The hotel is connected by the Providence Skybridge, constructed by the architect Friedrich St. Florian in 2000, with the Providence Place shopping mall.

=== COVID-19 pandemic ===
The COVID-19 pandemic forced the Omni to close to the public in March 2020. The hotel found some financial relief in January 2021 when nearby Brown University leased 240 rooms to provide socially distanced housing for their students, including weekly laundry service and a COVID testing site on the third floor.

=== Criticism ===
William McKenzie Woodward, a local architectural historian and staff member of the Rhode Island Historical Preservation & Heritage Commission does not believe its styling to be architecturally innovative, calling it "yet another bland addition to the city's growing recent collection of buildings seemingly designed not to offend."
