= Razzle (game) =

Carnival scam

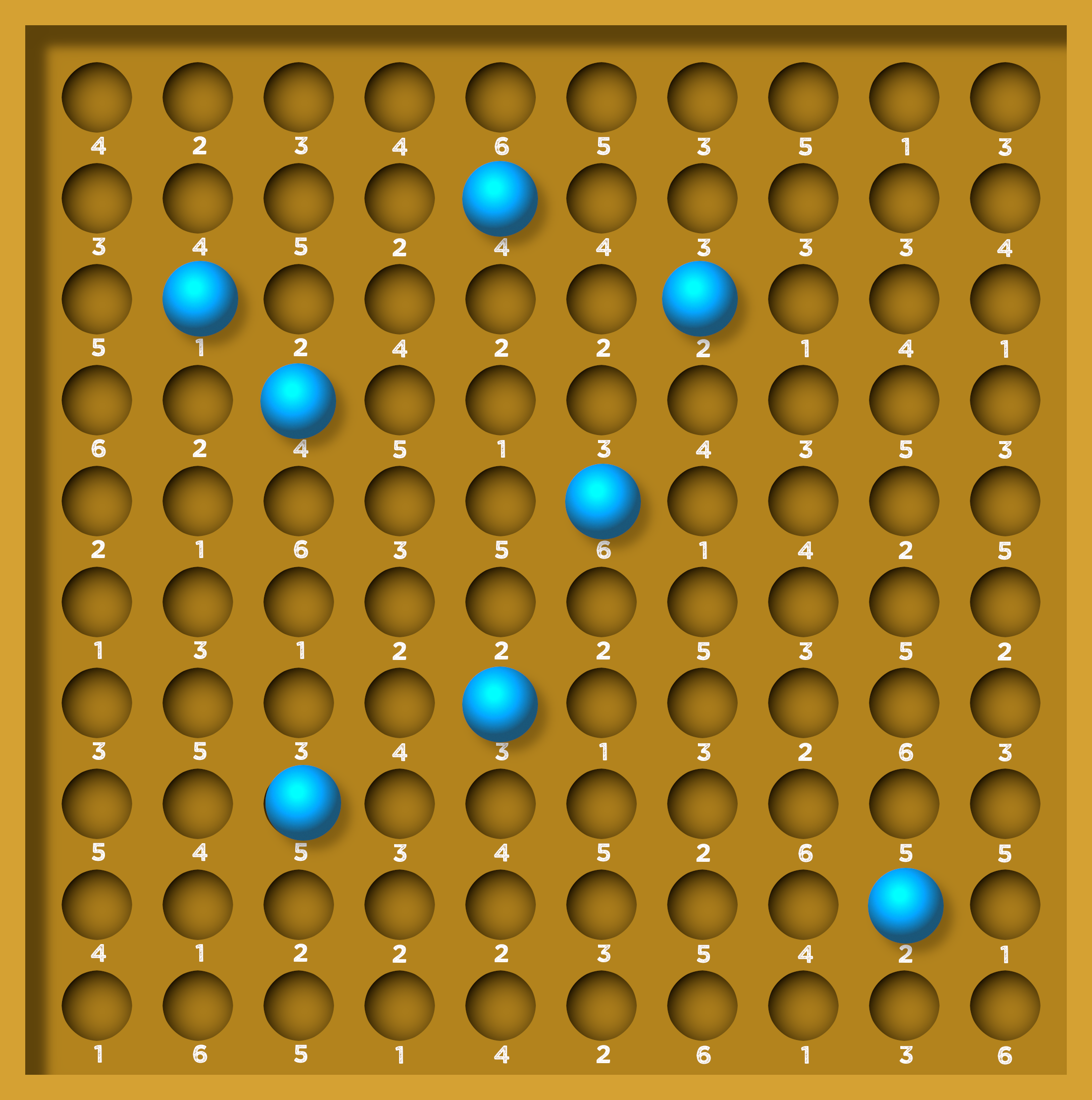
A diagram of a Razzle table, with eight marbles rolled. The total of the holes' numbers is 27.

Razzle (or Razzle-Dazzle) is a scam sometimes presented as a gambling game on carnival midways and historically, in the casinos of Havana, Cuba. The player throws a number of marbles onto a grid of holes, and the numbers of those holes award points which it is suggested can be converted into prizes. In reality, it is almost impossible for a player to win enough points for the prize. According to gaming expert Darwin Ortiz, the Razzle is seldom, if ever, run honestly.

This generic name of Razzle is seldom known to players, as it is generally presented under a name such as Football, Baseball, Ten Points Win, Mo-Co, Indian Poker or Cajun Bingo, selected to generate interest for the locals. The nature of the game makes it a particular money-maker for dishonest carnies.

== Play ==
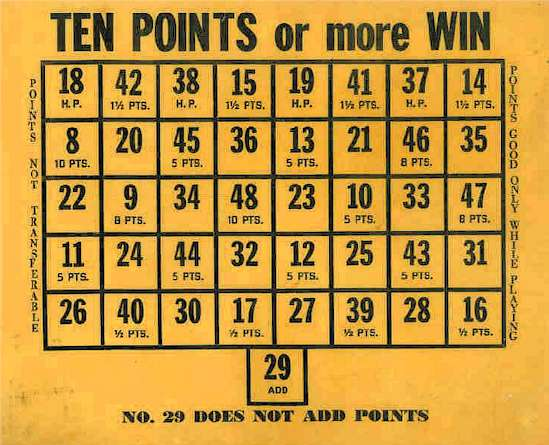
A Razzle game scoring chart

Razzle consists of a large playing board with over a hundred holes numbered 1 through 6. After making a bet, a player spills eight marbles onto the board from a cup, and the numbers of the holes they land in are added together and referenced on a chart that looks something like a calendar, telling the player how many points they have won for that roll. Around half of the squares on the chart show a number of points, while the other half are empty and score nothing. In football themed versions of the game, points scored are "yards". Significant prizes can be on offer, valued in the hundreds of dollars, but they can be won only when a player has reached a particular point or yard total. Some results on the chart may be marked "H.P." for a "house prize".

In most Razzle set-ups, the player must pay a set amount of money before each roll. Whenever the player throws a total of 29, the game is "doubled": the player must pay twice as much for all future rolls, but will receive an extra prize at the end of the game.

Jay Mallin records the game being played with eight dice instead of marbles and holes, in Cuban nightclubs and casinos in the 1950s. After complaints from the American embassy about tourists losing money in the clubs of Havana, President Fulgencio Batista ordered the game to be shut down.

== Scam ==
The points-per-number chart is the secret. The scattered order of the chart obscures the fact that the point-scoring squares are exclusively among the higher and lower throws.

Graph of the likelihoods of particular throws in a game of Razzle, where throws below 20 and above 36 (in red) score points, while all others (in grey) are much more likely, and score nothing.

A chart might list numbers from 8 through to 48, where a result in a middle range of 20 through 36 is shown as scoring the player nothing, while results 8 through 19 and 37 through 48 all pay out. Visually this would mean that more than half of the squares on the chart showed a payout (with 22 winning squares and only 16 losing ones), and a player might instinctively conclude that more than half of their throws will pay out. In reality, more than 98% of a player's throws will give a total somewhere in the 20-to-36 range.

Further to this, around 10% of throws will total to 29, and although this is presented as penalty for both sides ("Player and Operator must Double on Number 29") it merely accelerates the rate at which the player hands over their money: if the operator knows they can never lose, doubling the size of the prize makes no difference to them.

In practice, boards are not equivalent to fair dice, and instead contain a lot more 3s and 4s than other numbers, meaning that the odds of a scoring roll are even worse than the gambler might assume. The physical nature of the board itself also works against the player, with nearby marbles likely to fall into pairs that total seven.

Even if the game were run honestly, the mathematical nature of the razzle board makes it extremely unlikely that a player would ever win before running out of money, or that the value of the prizes won would ever equal the amount of money spent chasing them. The game operator may conceal this from the player by using a fast and incorrect count, to pretend that a throw scored when it did not. This is used initially to hook the player into the game by giving the player a generous number of wins in the opening throws of the game, taking them some way to the prize point total and giving the impression that the remaining points can be obtained just as easily. Once the player has become invested in the game, the operator will switch to counting the throws accurately, with nearly all of them being losses. If the player starts to show reluctance to continue, the operator will dole out just enough miscounted points to keep them at the table. Increasingly the player believes that walking away would be a disaster - they only need one or two more points to win the prize. Unfortunately for the player, they will only get those points if the operator allows it. According to Darwin Ortiz, most Razzle operators are not satisfied until they get their mark's last dollar.

The Razzle is such a devastatingly effective scam that some crooked booth operators have been known to even abandon their store's theme and "bring out the razzle". On a block in New Orleans in the early 2000s, tourists had reported losses of up to $18,000 to the scam. At Havana's Sans Souci Cabaret nightclub in the early 1950s, one American tourist reportedly lost $30,000 in a single night (equivalent to $364,000 in 2025).
