= Joseph F. McCormick =

American political activist (born 1962)

Joseph Francis McCormick, Jr.
- Born: November 17, 1962 (age 63)
- Education: Yale University
- Occupations: Author, political activist

Joseph Francis McCormick Jr. is a former American political candidate, political activist, transpartisan organizer and innovator, author and public speaker.

== Education and military service ==
McCormick attended Virginia Military Institute, graduating in 1984 with a bachelor's degree in electrical engineering. He was commissioned in the United States Army as a second lieutenant in the infantry, serving for two years as a platoon leader with the 82nd Airborne Division and two years with the 1st Ranger Battalion until leaving active duty in 1988 as a captain. McCormick subsequently attended the Yale School of Management and graduated in 1990 with a master's degree in Public and Private Management.

== Politics ==
=== Republican candidacy ===
McCormick was chairman of the Dougherty Republican Party in 1997 and the Republican candidate for Georgia's 2nd congressional district seat in the US House of Representatives in 1998. McCormick defeated fellow Republican Dylan Glenn in the primary, but subsequently lost to incumbent Democrat Sanford Bishop in the general election. In that election, McCormick raised more money from individual contributors ($437,000 compared with Bishop's $200,000) while raising just $63,000 from Political Action Committees. Bishop raised more than $400,000 in PAC contributions.

Although McCormick did not campaign against the president, Democrats used the threat of the Clinton impeachment to mobilize black voters, and McCormick suffered along with other Republicans. McCormick did not run during the 2000 election cycle, serving, instead, as a campaign chairman for his former primary opponent, Dylan Glenn.

=== Transpartisanship ===
After his defeat in the 1998 congressional campaign, McCormick served as an alternate-delegate in the 2000 Republican convention. He then dropped out of active political involvement, citing disillusionment with partisanship. In 2003 he retraced portions of the 1831 route of Alexis de Tocqueville interviewing political leaders of varying ideologies. Among the dozens of people interviewed included Ross Perot, Ralph Nader, Noam Chomsky, former Attorney General Ramsey Clark, American Conservative Union chairman David Keene, ACLU president Nadine Strossen, and Reagan White House Political Director Lyn Nofziger. McCormick produced a 20 minute documentary about this trip and a subsequent experiment in transpartisan citizen empowerment called the Rogue Valley Wisdom Council.

Between 2004 and 2007 as co-founder of the Reuniting America Project he and a steering committee organized seven such private, facilitated transpartisan leadership retreats. Among the more notable of the 145 participants included in these four day, off-the-record dialogues were Vice President Al Gore, conservative activist Grover Norquist, MoveOn.org co-founders Joan Blades and Wes Boyd, former Congressman Bob Barr, Competitive Enterprise Institute president Fred Smith, Congresswoman and former Common Cause president Shelly Pingree, Christian Coalition of America president Roberta Combs, and Harvard professor William Ury. From these private dialogues emerged numerous cross-spectrum initiatives including the Save the Internet Coalition, the Criminal Justice Reform Coalition, the Bridge Alliance, the Transpartisan Center, research from the National Coalition for Dialogue and Deliberation, including Living Room Conversations, as well as several books and articles about the theory, practice, and potential of transpartisan politics.

In February 2009, McCormick organized the first American Citizen's Summit in Denver, Colorado on the bicentennial of Abraham Lincoln's birth with the theme "A house divided against itself cannot stand." Out of this gathering emerged prototypes of a Transpartisan Alliance of grassroots groups representing millions of people and an associated policy council of leaders from major and minor parties called the Sunshine Cabinet. In 2011, he co-authored the e-book Reuniting America: A Toolkit for Changing the Political Game, an effort to summarize the lessons learned in the previous eight years of field research into practical means of reconciling the polarities in America at the national and grassroots level.

An article in Utne Reader characterizes him as a radical centrist thinker and activist.

== Personal life ==
Joseph Francis McCormick Jr. was born November 17, 1962, and raised in Pawling, New York. His father was an aerospace engineer and inventor of robotic controls, and his mother was a nurse and hospital administrator. He moved to Albany, Georgia, in 1994 and married Celeste Anderson, a former beauty pageant winner and head cheerleader.

He's currently a physics and engineering teacher in Shanghai New Epoch Bilingual School, in Chongming District, Shanghai, China.
