= Not Alex =

2008 US presidential campaign advertisement

Not Alex, also referred to as Baby Alex, is a political television advertisement which aired during the 2008 U.S. Presidential campaign. Created by MoveOn.org, the ad features a mother holding her baby, Alex, and telling the camera that John McCain couldn't have him as a future soldier in the Iraq War, making a reference to McCain's suggestion that the American presence in Iraq could last 100 years. MoveOn paid US$500,000 to run the ad for a week beginning 18 June in Michigan, Ohio and Wisconsin, and on cable channels CNN and MSNBC. The American Federation of State, County, and Municipal Employees helped finance the ad.

== Production ==
The commercial was paid for through the political action committees of the respective groups. AFSCME (American Federation of State, County, and Municipal Employees) is one of the largest labor unions in the United States, and MoveOn is a non-profit liberal public policy advocacy group. "Not Alex" cost US$540,000 to produce and market, and it was designed to air locally in the political swing states of Michigan, Ohio, and Wisconsin, as well as nationally on cable television. Eli Pariser, MoveOn.org's executive director, says, "The ad aims to give voice to so many people who are frustrated that we seem to be stuck in Iraq."

== The commercial ==
The ad features a mother holding a baby. The mom bounces the roughly one-year-old child in her lap while looking into the camera and personally addressing Republican Senator and presumptive Republican presidential nominee John McCain. The setting appears to be a room in her own house, and she looks directly into a low-end video recording device. She speaks for most of the ad's duration, saying,

Hi, John McCain. This is Alex. And he's my first. So far, his talents include trying any new food and chasing after our dog. That, and making my heart pound every time I look at him. And so, John McCain, when you say you would stay in Iraq for a hundred years, were you counting on Alex? Because if you were, you can't have him.

The commercial ends by going to a black screen with white text and a voiceover stating that the commercial has been paid for by MoveOn.org and AFSCME.

== Reception ==
Joan Blades praised the ad on the Huffington Post that the mother in the ad has "foresight" and has the "right priorities." Alex Koppelman said that the TV spot "goes straight for voters' heartstrings."

The ad was criticized by Jack Torry of the Columbus Dispatch as being "not entirely fair" since McCain said he only wanted troops in Iraq for 100 more years "as long as Americans are not being injured or harmed or wounded or killed." Chris Cillizza of the Washington Post worried that the emotions in the ad "could turn off many of those same voters who agree with MoveOn on the substance but disagree with the group on how it practices its politics." Meanwhile, Bill O'Reilly of Fox News wondered how the commercial could be taken seriously. Jon Stewart of The Daily Show "praised" MoveOn.org for "making even people who agree with you cringe". William Kristol of The New York Times commented that "The ad boldly embraces a vision of a selfish and infantilized America, suggesting that military service and sacrifice are unnecessary and deplorable relics of the past."
