= After Dark (software) =

Computer screensaver software

- Flying Toasters screensaver in After Dark 2.0
- Original authors: Jack Eastman; Patrick Beard
- Developer: Berkeley Systems
- Release: 1989; 37 years ago
- Stable release: 4.0 / 1996; 30 years ago
- Written in: assembly language, C
- Operating system: Apple Macintosh, Microsoft Windows, DOS
- Type: screensaver
- Website: en.infinisys.co.jp/product/adx/

After Dark is a series of computer screensaver software introduced by Berkeley Systems in 1989 for the Apple Macintosh, and in 1991 for Microsoft Windows.

After the original, additional editions included More After Dark, Before Dark, and editions themed around licensed properties such as Star Trek, The Simpsons, Looney Tunes, Marvel, and Disney characters.

The program allowed for the development and use of third-party modules supplementary to the original program, and hundreds of such modules were created during the main period of its popularity.

== Flying Toasters ==
An After Dark CD-ROM.

The most famous of the included screensaver modules is Flying Toasters, which featured 1940s-style chrome toasters sporting bird-like wings, flying across the screen with pieces of toast. Engineer Jack Eastman claims he thought of the display after seeing a toaster in a kitchen during a late-night programming session and imagining the addition of wings, although the winged toasters bear a strong resemblance to those on the cover of Jefferson Airplane’s 1973 album Thirty Seconds Over Winterland. A slider in the Flying Toasters module enabled users to adjust the toast's darkness, and an updated Flying Toasters Pro module added a choice of music—Richard Wagner's Ride of the Valkyries or a flying toaster anthem with optional karaoke lyrics.

The toasters were the subject of two lawsuits, the first in 1993, Berkeley Systems vs Delrina Corporation, concerning a module of Delrina's screensaver Opus 'N Bill in which Opus the penguin shoots down the toasters. After a U.S. District judge ruled that Delrina's "Death Toasters" was infringing, Delrina later changed the wings of the toasters to propellers. The second case was brought in 1994 by 1960s rock group Jefferson Airplane who claimed that the toasters were a copy of the winged toasters featured on the cover of their 1973 record album Thirty Seconds Over Winterland. The case was dismissed because the cover art had not been registered as a trademark by the group prior to Berkeley Systems' release of the screensaver.

== History ==
In 1997, Berkeley Systems was acquired by the Sierra On-Line division of CUC International. Joan Blades and Wes Boyd, the founders of Berkeley Systems, later created MoveOn.org. Ed Fries, co-developer of the popular Fish! screensaver, became vice president of game publishing at Microsoft.

The Bad Dog TV series, based on the After Dark module of the same name, was produced by CinéGroupe and Saban Entertainment for the Teletoon and Fox Family Channel networks that was first broadcast by Teletoon on March 1, 1999.

An official version of After Dark was released for Mac OS X running on PowerPC by Infinisys, Ltd. of Japan in May 2003. For Apple silicon and Intel Macs, remakes of three popular modules — "Flying Toasters", "Mowing Man" and "Boris" — were available as standalone screensavers. On March 29, 2026 the Infinisys web site announced that "sales of all of its products have been terminated".

Sierra Entertainment was acquired by Vivendi Games. Vivendi Universal Games released an After Dark: Flying Toaster video game for cellphones in 2006.

=== After Dark Games ===
Sierra Attractions and Berkeley Systems released After Dark Games in 1998 for the Macintosh and Windows platforms, which contained several games modeled after their previously released screensavers. These games included Mowin' Maniac (a Pac-Man clone based on the "Mowin' Man" and "Mowin' Boris" modules); Roof Rats (similar to SameGame and variants); Solitaire (After Dark themed); Toaster Run (an isometric Glider clone featuring several After Dark characters, including a Flying Toaster and Super Guy); Zapper (a trivia game); Hula Girl (an endless 2D platforming game based on the "Hula Twins" module); two word scramble games, Bad Dog 911 (based on the "Bad Dog" modules) and Fish Shtick (based on the "Fish" modules, mainly "Fish World"); Foggy Boxes (a dots and boxes game based on the "Messages 4.0" module); MooShu Tiles (a Mahjong solitaire game featuring many After Dark characters throughout the years); and Rodger Dodger (a Raimais clone that originated as an in-module game).

J.C. Herz of The New York Times wrote that the "sheer simplicity" of these games helped make them as "engaging and addictive as the mega-selling 40-hour sagas with souped-up 3-D sound and state-of-the-art computer graphics". A review in Computer Gaming World stated that, "If nothing else, it makes for a good time-killer."

== Modules ==
Module Name	Description
Starry Night	The default screen saver, featuring a pixelated city skyline under a night sky
Artist	A digital artist applies artistic touches to images in a slow manner so one can see the artist's work
Bad Dog	Popular module featuring a white dog with a black ring around one of his eyes, causing trouble on the desktop (the animated series Bad Dog was inspired by the eponymous screensaver)
Bad Dog!	A sequel to Bad Dog with new animations and sequences
Bogglins	Green slime creatures are formed and make obnoxious noises
Boris	The opposite of Bad Dog, a good cat plays on the desktop and chases butterflies
Bouncing Ball	A ball bounces around the screen, including bouncing off the edges
Bugs	Digital bugs crawl across the screen
Bulge	Expands portions of the screen, making the screen appear to have a "bulge"
Bungee Roulette (Note: An edition named After Dark Totally Twisted includes the more macabre modules, namely Bungee Roulette, Chameleon, Coming Soon!, Flying Toilets, FrankenScreen, Message Mayhem, Mike's So-called Life, Mime Hunt, Mowin' Boris, Phlegm Boy, Shock Clocks, Toxic Swamp, and Voyeur.)	Various characters bungee-jump from the top of the screen, but occasionally the bungee cord breaks
Can of Worms	"Worms" emerge from the screen, crawl around, and "eat" the screen content
Chameleon	Chameleons walk across the screen, changing colors and eating icons
Clocks	Different objects appear as a clock and move around
Coming Soon!	A salesperson pitches fictitious "products"
Confetti Factory	Confetti falls from the top of the screen and onto conveyor belts below
Daredevil Dan	A daredevil motorcyclist attempts dangerous jumps over school buses, flames, and piranha tanks
Dominoes	A game of dominoes is played on the screen
Doodles	Draws doodle-like images
DOS Shell	A mock DOS shell is run on the screen, reliving earlier days of computing
Dots	A game of "dots" is played on the screen
Down the Drain	The desktop appears to spiral down a drain
Einstein	Complex mathematical and scientific equations are performed on the screen
Fade Away	The desktop fades away in different ways
Fish! (Aquatic Realm)	Underwater world of fish with a black background
Fish Pro	An updated version of Fish!
Fish World	The third iteration of Fish! with prerendered 3D models
Floating Suns (Note: Modules from the Still in the Dark collection of 11 modules by Bob Loeffler.)	Displays the Phoenix Suns basketball team's logos floating around the screen
Flocks	Displays flocks of various creatures on the screen
Flying Toasters	Classic module featuring flying toasters
Flying Toasters Pro	Updated version that allows one to select more than flying toasters and also has music
Flying Toasters!	4.0 iteration of the flying toasters with updated graphics and music — introduces baby toasters
Flying Toilets	Parody of Flying Toasters with toilets replacing the toasters
Fractal Forest	A forest of trees is generated on the screen
FrankenScreen	A digital Frankenstein creates creatures out of various parts
Frost and Fire	Produces patterns similar to splattering paint on paper
GeoBounce	A geometrical figure bounces around the screen
Globe	Takes an image and wraps it around a sphere, then spins like a globe
GraphStat	Draws scientific and mathematical graphs on the screen
Gravity	Circles bounce around the screen
Guts	Gravity simulation
Hall of Fame	10th-anniversary module featuring anime-style recreations of various After Dark characters
Hall of Mirrors	Reflects parts of the screen in an infinite mirror style
Hallucinations	The computer "hallucinates"
Hard Rain	Rain falls onto the desktop
Hula Twins	Displays two animated figures who walk around and twirl hula hoops
Lasers	Lasers create patterns on the screen
Lissajous	Displays Lissajous designs
Logo	User-supplied image moves randomly on the screen
Lunatic Fringe	A playable space shooter game within a module
Magic	Creates soothing patterns
Mandelbrot	Generates a mathematically created Mandelbrot set
Marbles	Marbles bounce around the screen
Meadow	A computer-generated meadow
Message Mayhem	A figure on the screen scrawls out a message
Messages	Displays a crawling marquee message on the screen with selectable font and text colors
Mike's So-called Life	Features a man named Mike, living in his apartment and doing nothing exciting
Mime Hunt	A playable module that features a mime and cross-hairs
Modern Art	Modern Art displayed on the screen
Mondrian	Inverts parts of the screen
Mosaic	Creates a mosaic of the screen
Mountains	Generates 3-D mountains
Movies 'Til Dawn	Plays QuickTime movies
Mowin' Boris	Mowin' Man mows a field with Boris the cat around. When Mowin' Man runs over Boris, blood and guts, appear
Mowin' Man	A man mows a constantly growing field
MultiModule	Displays a user-selected combination of After Dark modules with the modules all displayed simultaneously and optionally overlaid over each other
NightLines	
Nirvana	Generates colorful textures
Nocturnes	Shows the eyes of various nocturnal creatures, such as bats
Nonsense	Nonsensical phrases are displayed on the screen
Om Appliances	Various appliances do weird things on the screen
Origami	Computer-generated origami appears on the screen
Out and About	A musician walks out with a chair and an instrument, sits down and begins to play while other people slowly appear and begin milling around while kids play
Pattern	Animated patterns appear on the screen
Pearl	An optical effect featuring squares
Penrose	Penrose tiling effect
Phlegm Boy	An obnoxious slimy creature is disgusting and displays bad habits
Photon	Computer-generated particles of light are emitted from the darkness
PICS Player	Plays an animated sequence from a PICS file on the Mac platform
Plasma	Plasma-like image generated
Punch Out	Round holes appear to be punched out of the desktop
Puzzle	The desktop becomes a sliding puzzle
Rain	Colorful raindrops fall on the desktop
Rainstorm	Like the Rain module, but with wind and lightning
Rainy Day	Rain drops on the screen. Users can select how fast they fall and how strong the wind is.
Randomizer	Randomly displays modules chosen from a user-generated list of modules
Rat Race	A race featuring three rats with names, mindlessly wandering around the track until there is a winner
Rebound	Balls rebound around the screen
Rose	Mathematical pattern based on trigonometry
Satori	Color animated light show
Say What?	Displays humorous phrases
Scrubbing Bubbles	Displays multiple Scrubbing Bubbles (Dow Brands) floating around the screen
Scrubbing Bubbles II	Displays multiple Scrubbing Bubbles (Dow Brands) "scrubbing" the screen and going down the drain
Shapes	Fills the screen with colorful, geometric shapes
Shock Clocks	Scary creatures are turned into clocks
Shooting Spree	The desktop appears to be shot up by a gun. Users can select which gun to use.
Sinkhole	The desktop appears to fall into sinkholes
Slide Show	A basic slide show of user-supplied images
Snake	A pixelated snake tries to find its way through a maze
Spheres	A number of spheres fill the screen
Spin Brush	Smears points on the screen like wet paper
Spiral Gyro	Vector module that twists lines
Spotlight	The desktop becomes black, and parts are "illuminated" by a randomly moving light spot
Squigwig	Generates mathematical circles
Stained Glass	Produces quilt-like patterns
Steam Rollin'	Displays a guy driving around squishing toys, snakes and babies (a take-off on the Mowin' Man module)
Stormy Night	Random lightning bolts with thunderclap sounds
Strange Attractor	Computer-generated color image
String Theory	Moire patterns
Sunburst	Color pattern that appears to come from the Sun
Supernova	Displays an exploding supernova
Swan Lake	Swans swim around the desktop
This Ol' House	Someone appears to be working on the desktop from the other side with power saws
Toaster 2K	10th anniversary module featuring futuristic and mecha versions of the flying toasters
Toxic Swamp	Parody of Fish!, but in a toxic, polluted swamp with mutated fish and a mob boss
Tunnel	Makes the screen appear to be a tunnel
Use Your Own!	Displays multiple images of the users choice moving around the screen
Vertigo	Colorful rainbow spirals drawn on the screen
Virex-D	An implementation of the Virex anti-virus utility. Scans for viruses and displays icons in 3D form
Voyeur	One appears to be spying on an apartment complex with a big city skyline in the background
Warp	One appears to be travelling among stars at high speed
Window Blinds	Desktop is separated into columns, and then each one turns like a window blind
Wrap Around	Draws three-dimensional loops
Wrecking Ball	A wrecking ball appears to demolish the desktop
You Bet Your Head	Playable quiz game featuring three colored "heads" that are smashed by a hammer if one supplies the wrong answer to a question
Zoom!	Creates colorful triangular tubes
Zot	Attempts to generate lightning

== Release history ==
- version 1.0 - 1989
- version 2.0 - 1992 - The first official release for Windows.
- version 3.0 - 1994
- version 3.2 - 1995
- version 4.0 - 1996

== Licensed products ==
- Star Trek: The Screen Saver - 1992
- The Disney Collection Screen Saver - 1993
- Marvel Comics Screen Posters - 1993
- X-Men Screen Saver - 1994
- The Simpsons Screen Saver - 1994
- The Lion King - 1994
- Star Trek: The Next Generation Screen Saver - 1994
- Looney Tunes Screen Saver - 1995
- Toy Story - 1995
- Myst Screen Saver
- Chex Quest Screen Saver - 1997 (unlicensed module built on the After Dark software)
- The Disney Collection Screen Saver 2nd Edition - 1997
- Star Wars - 1997
