= Bad Dog (TV series) =

- Genre: Animation
- Written by: Taylor Grant; Brent Piaskoski
- Directed by: Joseph Jacques
- Voices of: Harvey Atkin; Sheila McCarthy; John Stocker; Amos Crawley; Emilie-Claire Barlow; Tracey Moore; Robert Smith; James Rankin; Ron Rubin; Richard Binsley; Don Francks; Cole Caplan; Philip Williams; Michael Hall
- Countries of origin: Canada; United States
- Original language: English
- No. of seasons: 2
- No. of episodes: 40

Production
- Executive producers: Jacques Pettigrew; Michael Lemire
- Producer: Louis Duquet
- Production companies: CinéGroupe; Saban Entertainment

Original release
- Network: Fox Kids (international); Fox Family Channel (U.S.); Teletoon (Canada)
- Release: August 15, 1998 – December 14, 2000

Bad Dog is an animated series produced by CinéGroupe and Saban Entertainment for the Teletoon and Fox Family Channel networks, first airing on Teletoon on March 1, 1999. The cartoon focused on the Potanski family and their dog Berkeley. The show's gimmick was that, whenever Berkeley was told that he was a bad dog, he would freeze and pretend to be dead until someone told him he was a good dog.

The show was inspired by the After Dark screensaver "Bad Dog". The two dogs have a similar appearance, and the "Bad Dog" of the show is named Berkeley, a likely reference to Berkeley Systems, the creators of After Dark. The show was paired with another series called Monster Farm.

Internationally, the series did air on Fox Kids (later known as Jetix), being lastly rerun in 2011 on Disney Channel in the Netherlands.

== Characters ==
- Berkeley aka "Barky": The not-so-normal dog owned by the Potanski family who likes having adventures and always gets everyone into trouble. He appears to have a compulsion to obey every order he hears, including those that were not given to him. As a running gag, he passes out when he hears Bad Dog and wakes up when he hears Good Dog.
- Vic Potanski: The father of the Potanski family and the owner of Berkeley. He is an inventor who owns a business called "Potanski's Top of the Line", however all of his inventions backfire with disastrous results.
- Madeline Potanski: The mother of the Potanski family. She is a psychiatrist whose office is located in the house, where she uses treatments like hypnosis and puppets on her patients.
- "Little Vic" Potanski: The younger Potanski son. He loves Berkeley extremely and often goes on adventures with him.
- Penelope Potanski: The sole Potanski daughter. She likes her beauty, and also seems to have something of a penchant for the theatre.
- Trevor Potanski: The easily panicked genius older son with a like of playing chess. He wears glasses. He also has a large amount of allergies and phobias.
- Grandfather Potanski: The eldest Potanski. Once an astronaut, he likes watching space-related programs on TV and often mistakes everyone's name.
- Lester Johnson: Neighbor of the Potanskis who loves his cat named Special, but hates Berkeley and often calls him "The Beast Dog".
- Special: Lester Johnson's cat, who usually doesn't move and frequently sought out by Berkeley.
- Mrs. Simpkins: A frequent patient of Mrs. Potanski, who has a phobia of practically everything; her main phobia, however, appears to be of dogs.
- Woods: The commander of a spacecat army who hates how their fellow pets are treated on Earth and plots to free them from the humans. However, he gets captured by Berkeley and Little Vic and gets mistaken as a kitten and he gets adopted into the Potanski family despite Woods's protest.

== Voices ==
- Harvey Atkin as Vic Potanski
- Sheila McCarthy as Madeline Potanski
- John Stocker as Grandfather Potanski
- Amos Crawley as Trevor Potanski
- Emilie-Claire Barlow as Penelope Potanski, Priscilla the Supermodel
- Tracey Moore as Little Vic Potanski (Season 1)
- Robert Smith as Berkeley
- James Rankin as Lester Johnson
- Ron Rubin
- Richard Binsley as The-Rat-Away-3000
- Don Francks
- Cole Caplan as Little Vic Potanski (Season 2)
- Philip Williams as Barry Little
- Michael Hall as Professor Peerless

== Episodes ==
=== Season 1 (1998–99) ===
- 1. Disobedience School: Part 1 / Disobedience School: Part 2

The Potanski family must figure out why their dog, Berkeley, is acting weird. / Mrs. Eva hypnotizes Berkeley to be a normal dog, not the crazy dog.

- 2. Beast of Show / Trouble with Toto

Berkeley joins Lester and Special in travel for the cat show. / Penelope tries to get rid of Berkeley from the school performance about the Wizard of Oz.

- 3. Take Me Out of the Ballgame / Potanskis Go Hollywood

Vic decides to put Berkeley, Trevor, Penelope and Trevor's friends into a baseball team. / Vic decides to put his family into a commercial.

- 4. Space Dog / Robo-Dog

Berkeley and Grandfather Potanski accidentally go into outer space. / The Potanski Family order a robot dog named Happyway 3000.

- 5. Berkeley Takes the Cake / Neighborhood Botch

Penelope tries to hide her birthday cake from Berkeley. / Berkeley stops two criminals dressed as pirates from robbing Lester’s house and kidnapping Special.

- 6. The Mild Bunch / Berkeley Smells a Rat

Vic takes Berkeley, Little Vic, Trevor and Trevor's friends as the scouts to the forest. / Berkeley feels a rat inside the house.

- 7. Buckaroo Berkeley / Real Incredible Genius Dog

Vic wishes to ride on the bull called Jack Mallet. / The Potanski family take Berkeley into a competition The Animal Geniuses.

- 8. Big Inflatable Dog / Berkeley Speaks Out

Barry, Harry and Larry Vickers, who are the mayors of the three towns called Pleasantville, win the platform competition. / Trevor creates the Trevortron 1000 for the science contest.

- 9. Bad Dad / They Came, They Saw, They Meowed

Vic becomes very angry at Berkeley for causing troubles at Vic's birthday. / Berkeley takes a spacecat named Woods, who's the commander of the cat invasion, to Vic.

- 10. Sick Puppy / Bad Dog to the Bone

Mrs. Potanski hypnotizes Berkeley to don't be afraid of the vet. / It's revealed that the house of Potanskis is above the underground temple of the golden mole.

- 11. The Flying Potanskis / Burden of Woof

Penelope is excited to be a star of the circus, like Betty Bolinda. / Mr. Johnson wants to get Berkeley to the jail for abducting Special.

- 12. A Dog for All Sneezens / If Bad Dog Had a Hammer

Berkeley and Trevor have an allergy for dog shampoo, but it can be solved. / Berkeley, Vic, Little Vic and Trevor renovate Madeline's room and instead they blow up the house.

- 13. Love Dog / Bad Dog Ate My Homework

Grandfather Potanski misses his girlfriend. / Berkeley tries to eat Penelope's science experiment.

- 14. Dogs Are People Too / Fire Dog

Berkeley is once again hypnotized to be a normal dog. / Berkeley, Vic and Trevor become fire guards.

- 15. It's a Zoo in Here / A Cat of a Different Color

The Potanskis go to the zoo and Berkeley meets a depressed monkey. / Berkeley and Little Vic decide to play with Special and Catsanova.

- 16. Til Dog Do Us Part / Psycho Dog

Mrs. Simpkins and Walter get married. / Mr. Johnson loses his voice.

- 17. Celebrity Spokesdog / Jurassic Bark

Berkeley becomes famous at the dog cookies commercial. / Berkeley and Little Vic want to see the Spodoraptors.

- 18. Bad Dog Overboard / Dr. Bad Dog's 2½ Day Diet

Berkeley, Vic, Little Vic, Trevor and Grandfather Potanski go for a fishing competition. / Berkeley tries to put Vic into a diet.

- 19. Super Bad Dog / A Man's Best Fred

Berkeley becomes a superhero. / Trevor becomes obsessed with a robot called Fred.

- 20. If I Were a Bad Dog / Bad Night at the Opera

Sally decides to change the roles of the Potanski family. / Berkeley joins his owners at the opera.

- 21. Bad Dog Imitates Art / No Bad Dogs Allowed

Berkeley and Little Vic help Penelope for creating the portrait for art contest. / After Berkeley becomes dirty, he's taken to the dog hairdresser for a bath.

- 22. Bad Therapy / Police Dog

Berkeley, Little Vic, Madeline and Grandfather Potanski help the elder people to be happy. / Berkeley becomes a policeman.

- 23. Bad Connection / Prison Dog

Berkeley creates a tunnel what leads from his dog house to Mr. Johnson's house. / Berkeley helps two candy criminals escape from prison.

- 24. Barky's Arky / Nightmare on Berkeley's Street

Berkeley takes the animals for the Ark. / Grandfather Potanski is having the nightmares.

- 25. 101 Berkeleys / The Isle of Bad Dog

Trevor accidentally creates 101 Berkeleys and becomes scared for ruining the house, but it turns out to be a dream. / Berkeley is mistaken for being a Jelekreb.

- 26. Smiley Says... Bad Dog / No Cure for a Bad Dog

Berkeley and Little Vic want to be the stars of Smiley's show. / Vic caught the hiccups after drinking the coke.

=== Season 2 (2000) ===
Teletoon air dates in parentheses:

- 27. Badseat Driver / International Genius Dog (June 6, 2000)

The Potanski family buys a new car. / Berkeley once again goes to a competition the Genius animal.

- 28. Bad Dog's Incredible Journey / Nurse Barky (February 2, 2000)

On the way to the amusement park, Berkeley is left behind at the dog pound. Berkeley runs away and, while on his way to the amusement park, Berkeley stops the criminals and saves the life of a little kid. / Penelope fakes illness to get away from school, but Berkeley and Little Vic think she’s really sick and “help” her.

- 29. One Bad Apple / Beauty and the Beast Dog (February 9, 2000)

Berkeley goes into a kindergarten. / Trevor seeks Berkeley's help in getting away from a crazy girl.

- 30. Booty for Bad Dog / Dog Breath (February 9, 2000)

Berkeley goes underwater, looking for treasure. / Berkeley's breath becomes stinky.

- 31. Safari Dog / Magic Dog (February 16, 2000)

The Potanski family goes into safari park. / The Potanski family sees a show of a magician, Mr. Poteyton, but Berkeley reveals that these all tricks are fake.

- 32. Ye Olde Bad Dog / Bad Dogs and Englishmen (February 16, 2000)

The Potanski family goes into a knight fair. / Berkeley is taken away by the English family.

- 33. Dog-Napped / Bad Dog-Eared (February 23, 2000)

Berkeley is abducted by two criminals. / Berkeley begins unhear all.

- 34. Counting Sheep Dogs / Beauty Dog (February 23, 2000)

Vic is attacked by insomnia. / Berkeley goes into a pageant.

- 35. Wag the Bad Dog / Dog House Arrest (March 1, 2000)

Berkeley joins his owners at the trip at Washington. / Berkeley is grounded from going outside.

- 36. Ding, Dong, Bad Dog Calling / Guard Dog (March 1, 2000)

Berkeley and Little Vic try to give Mr. Johnson the chocolate bars. / Berkeley teaches himself from the TV how to be the guard dog.

- 37. A Super Bad Hair Day / Animal Magnetism (March 8, 2000)

Berkeley makes the problems for a model. / Berkeley eats a magnet.

- 38. Earth Dog / Good Lovin' Gone Bad Dog (March 8, 2000)

At the Earth days, Vic, Trevor and Grandfather Potanski try to get rid of this, but are stopped by Berkeley and Penelope. / Berkeley and Mrs. Simpkins are hypnotized for a love.

- 39. A Very Berkeley Christmas / Doggy Detective (December 14, 2000)

Little Vic wants to have Santa Claus as his Christmas gift. / Berkeley investigates the thieves.

- 40. Bad Blood is Thicker Than Water / They Came, They Saw, They Purred (May 3, 2000)

Berkeley is reunited with his family. / The assistants of Woods try to get their leader back to their team.
