= Americans Against Escalation in Iraq =

Americans Against Escalation in Iraq (AAEI) was a coalition of advocacy groups (including MoveOn.org, Center for American Progress Action Fund, Americans United for Change, Win Without War, and others) in the United States opposed to the Iraq War. In June 2007, they launched a multimillion-dollar campaign entitled "Iraq Summer" aimed at turning public opinion against the war and bringing political pressure against those in the U.S. Congress that support it. The program involved 100 staff members in 15 states and is focused on 60 members of Congress.
