= United States House Appropriations Subcommittee on Agriculture, Rural Development, Food and Drug Administration, and Related Agencies =

Subcommittee of Committee on Appropriations
- Active United States House of Representatives; 119th Congress

Leadership
- Chair: Andy Harris (R)
- Ranking Member: Sanford Bishop (D)

Structure
- Seats: 15 (15 currently filled) 9/9 6/6
- Political parties: Majority (9): Republican (9); Minority (6): Democratic (6)

Meeting place
- 2362A, Rayburn House Office Building; Washington, D.C. 20515

Phone number
- (202)-225-2638

The House Subcommittee on Agriculture, Rural Development, Food and Drug Administration, and Related Agencies is a standing subcommittee within the House Appropriations Committee. The United States House Committee on Appropriations and the United States Senate Committee on Appropriations have joint jurisdiction over all appropriations bills in the United States Congress. Each committee has 12 matching subcommittees, each of which is tasked with working on one of the twelve annual regular appropriations bills.

== Appropriations process ==
Traditionally, after a federal budget for the upcoming fiscal year has been passed, the appropriations subcommittees receive information about what the budget sets as their spending ceilings. This is called "302(b) allocations" after section 302(b) of the Congressional Budget Act of 1974. That amount is separated into smaller amounts for each of the twelve Subcommittees. The federal budget does not become law and is not signed by the President. Instead, it is guide for the House and the Senate in making appropriations and tax decisions. However, no budget is required and each chamber has procedures in place for what to do without one. The House and Senate now consider appropriations bills simultaneously, although originally the House went first. The House Committee on Appropriations usually reports the appropriations bills in May and June and the Senate in June. Any differences between appropriations bills passed by the House and the Senate are resolved in the fall.

== Appropriations bills ==
An appropriations bill is a bill that appropriates (gives to, sets aside for) money to specific federal government departments, agencies, and programs. The money provides funding for operations, personnel, equipment, and activities. Regular appropriations bills are passed annually, with the funding they provide covering one fiscal year. The fiscal year is the accounting period of the federal government, which runs from October 1 to September 30 of the following year.

There are three types of appropriations bills: regular appropriations bills, continuing resolutions, and supplemental appropriations bills. Regular appropriations bills are the twelve standard bills that cover the funding for the federal government for one fiscal year and that are supposed to be enacted into law by October 1. If Congress has not enacted the regular appropriations bills by the time, it can pass a continuing resolution, which continues the pre-existing appropriations at the same levels as the previous fiscal year (or with minor modifications) for a set amount of time. The third type of appropriations bills are supplemental appropriations bills, which add additional funding above and beyond what was originally appropriated at the beginning of the fiscal year. Supplemental appropriations bills can be used for things like disaster relief.

Appropriations bills are one part of a larger United States budget and spending process. They are preceded in that process by the president's budget proposal, congressional budget resolutions, and the 302(b) allocation. Article One of the United States Constitution, section 9, clause 7, states that "No money shall be drawn from the Treasury, but in Consequence of Appropriations made by Law..." This is what gives Congress the power to make these appropriations. The President, however, still has the power to veto appropriations bills.

== Jurisdiction ==
- (1) Department of Agriculture (except the United States Forest Service)
- (2) Farm Credit Administration
- (3) Farm Credit System Financial Assistance Corporation
- (4) Commodity Futures Trading Commission
- (5) Food and Drug Administration (part of the Department of Health and Human Services)

== Membership, 119th Congress ==
Majority	Minority
Andy Harris, Maryland, Chair; Robert Aderholt, Alabama; David Valadao, California; John Moolenaar, Michigan; Dan Newhouse, Washington; Julia Letlow, Louisiana; Ben Cline, Virginia; Ashley Hinson, Iowa; Scott Franklin, Florida, Vice Chair	Sanford Bishop, Georgia, Ranking Member; Chellie Pingree, Maine; Lauren Underwood, Illinois; Marie Gluesenkamp Perez, Washington; Marcy Kaptur, Ohio; Debbie Wasserman Schultz, Florida
Ex officio
Tom Cole, Oklahoma	Rosa DeLauro, Connecticut

== Historical subcommittee rosters ==
=== 118th Congress ===
Majority	Minority
Andy Harris, Maryland, Chair; David Valadao, California; John Moolenaar, Michigan; Dan Newhouse, Washington; Julia Letlow, Louisiana; Ben Cline, Virginia; Ashley Hinson, Iowa; Jerry Carl, Alabama; Scott Franklin, Florida	Sanford Bishop, Georgia, Ranking Member; Chellie Pingree, Maine; Lauren Underwood, Illinois; Marcy Kaptur, Ohio; Barbara Lee, California; Debbie Wasserman Schultz, Florida
Ex officio
Kay Granger, Texas	Rosa DeLauro, Connecticut

=== 117th Congress ===
Majority	Minority
Sanford Bishop, Georgia, Chair; Chellie Pingree, Maine, Vice Chair; Mark Pocan, Wisconsin; Lauren Underwood, Illinois; Barbara Lee, California; Betty McCollum, Minnesota; Debbie Wasserman Schultz, Florida; Henry Cuellar, Texas; Grace Meng, New York	Jeff Fortenberry, Nebraska, Ranking Member; Robert Aderholt, Alabama; Andy Harris, Maryland; David Valadao, California; John Moolenaar, Michigan; Dan Newhouse, Washington
Ex officio
Rosa DeLauro, Connecticut	Kay Granger, Texas

=== 116th Congress ===
Members, 116th Congress
Majority	Minority
Sanford Bishop, Georgia, Chair; Rosa DeLauro, Connecticut, Vice Chair; Chellie Pingree, Maine; Mark Pocan, Wisconsin; Barbara Lee, California; Betty McCollum, Minnesota; Henry Cuellar, Texas	Jeff Fortenberry, Nebraska, Ranking Member; Robert Aderholt, Alabama; Andy Harris, Maryland; John Moolenaar, Michigan
Ex officio
Nita Lowey, New York	Kay Granger, Texas

== See also ==
- U.S. Senate Appropriations Subcommittee on Agriculture, Rural Development, Food and Drug Administration, and Related Agencies
