= Sanford Bishop =

American politician (born 1947)

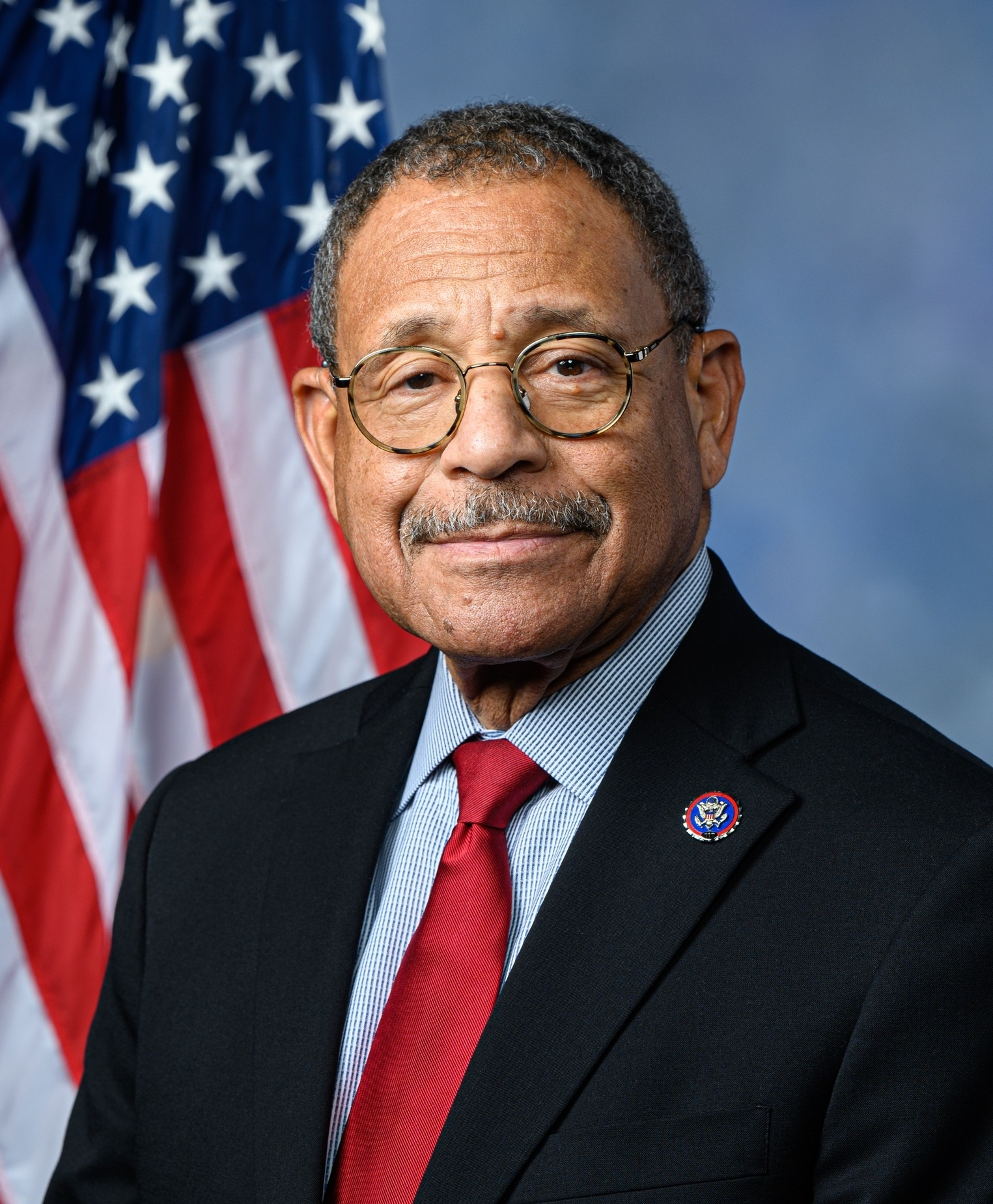
- Official portrait, 2023

Member of the U.S. House of Representatives from Georgia's 2nd district
- Incumbent
- Assumed office January 3, 1993
- Preceded by: Charles Hatcher

Member of the Georgia State Senate from the 15th district
- In office January 14, 1991 – January 3, 1993
- Preceded by: Gary Parker
- Succeeded by: Ed Harbison

Member of the Georgia House of Representatives from the 94th district
- In office January 10, 1977 – January 14, 1991
- Preceded by: Ed Berry
- Succeeded by: Maretta Taylor

Personal details
- Born: Sanford Dixon Bishop Jr. February 4, 1947 (age 79) Mobile, Alabama, U.S.
- Party: Democratic
- Spouse: Vivian Creighton (m. 1997)
- Children: 1
- Education: Morehouse College (BA); Emory University (JD)
- Website: House website Campaign website

Military service
- Branch/service: United States Army
- Years of service: 1968–1971
- Bishop's voice Bishop on the FY2015 Military Construction and Veterans' Affairs Appropriations Bill. Recorded April 30, 2014

Sanford Dixon Bishop Jr. (born February 4, 1947) is an American lawyer and politician serving as the U.S. representative for Georgia's 2nd congressional district since 1993. He became the dean of Georgia's congressional delegation after the death of John Lewis. A member of the Blue Dog Coalition, he belongs to the moderate faction of the Democratic Party. His district is in southwestern Georgia and includes Albany, Thomasville, and most of Columbus and Macon.

== Early life, education, and legal career ==
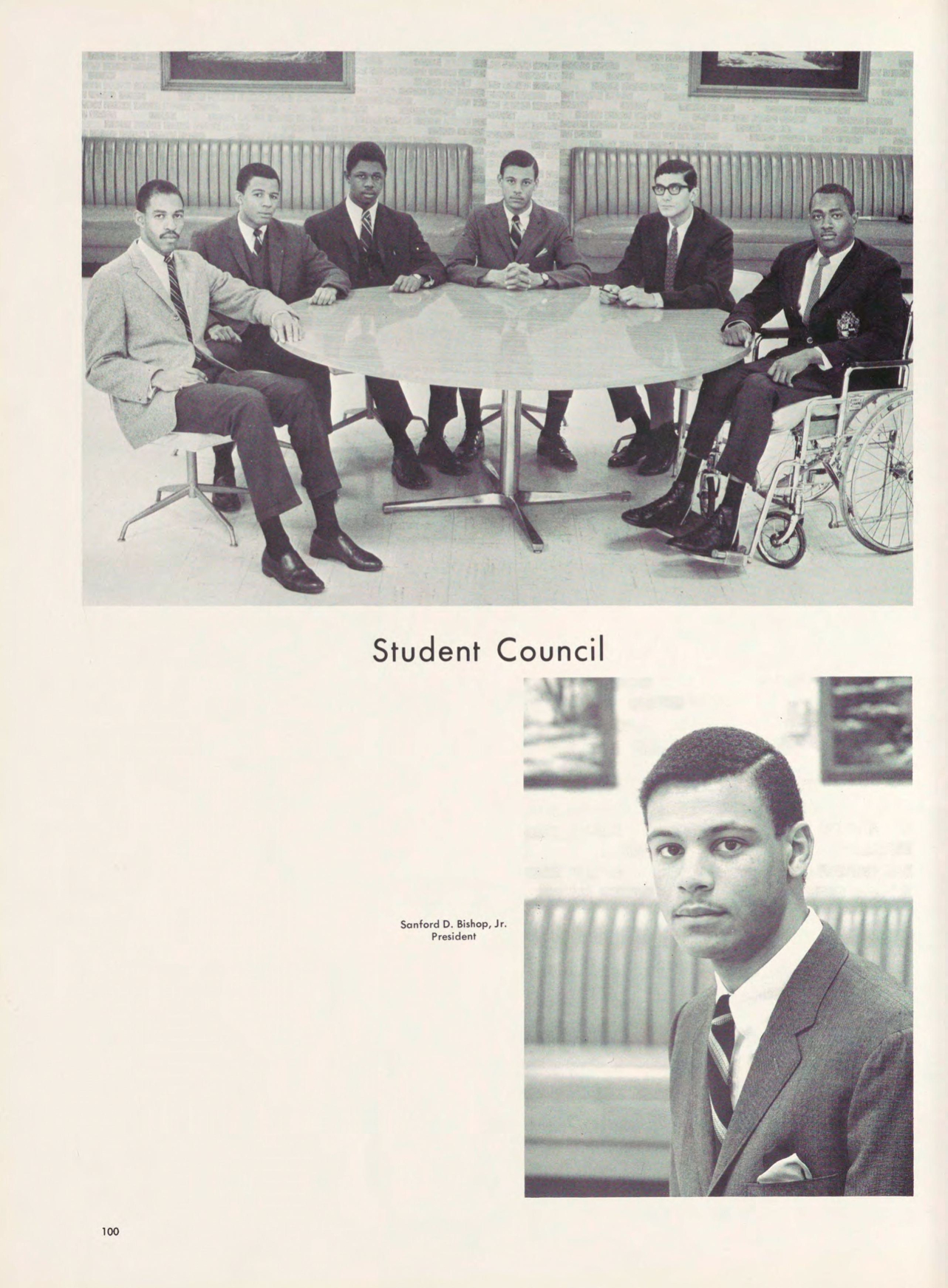
Bishop in the Morehouse College yearbook, 1968

Bishop was born in Mobile, Alabama, to Minnie B. Slade and Sanford Dixon Bishop, the first president of Bishop State Community College. Bishop obtained a Bachelor of Arts degree from Morehouse College in 1968, majoring in political science and minoring in English, and a Juris Doctor from the Emory University School of Law in 1971. At Morehouse, he was a classmate of Herman Cain. He served in the United States Army between 1969 and 1971. Bishop subsequently operated a law firm in Columbus, Georgia.

Bishop has received the Distinguished Eagle Scout Award from the Boy Scouts of America (BSA), given to Eagle Scouts for distinguished career achievement. He is a member of BSA's Order of the Arrow (OA) and as a youth was on the OA ceremonies team. He is a resident of Albany, Georgia, where he is a member of the Mount Zion Baptist Church. Bishop is a Life Member of Kappa Alpha Psi fraternity, initiated at Morehouse's Pi chapter. He is a Shriner and 33° Mason.

Bishop is married to Vivian Creighton, who served from 1993 to 2021 as Municipal Clerk of Columbus.

== Georgia legislature ==
Bishop was elected to the Georgia House of Representatives in 1977, where he remained until being elected to the Georgia State Senate in 1990.

== U.S. House of Representatives ==
=== Elections ===
==== 1992 ====
After only one term in the state senate, he ran for the 2nd district in 1992, which was held by six-term U.S. Congressman Charles Hatcher, a white moderate Democrat. The 2nd had been reconfigured as a black-majority district during congressional apportionment following the 1990 Census. Bishop finished second behind Hatcher in a crowded six-way primary. Hatcher failed to reach the 50% threshold, and was forced into a runoff election. During the campaign Bishop attacked Hatcher for bouncing 819 checks in the House banking scandal. Bishop defeated him 53%–47%. In the general election, he defeated Republican Jim Dudley 64%–36%.

==== 1994 ====
In the Democratic primary, he defeated James Bush 67%–33%. In the general election, he won reelection to a second term with 66%.

==== 1996 ====
In 1995, a 5–4 majority of the Supreme Court ruled that the redistricting of Georgia had violated the equal protection clause of the Fourteenth Amendment to the United States Constitution. The 2nd district was thus redrawn. The newly redrawn district was 60% white. Nonetheless, Bishop won reelection to a third term with 54% of the vote.

==== 1998 ====
Bishop won reelection to a fourth term against Republican Joseph F. McCormick with 57% of the vote. During the campaign, Bishop received twice the campaign financing that his opponent raised.

==== 2000 ====
Bishop defeated Dylan Glenn, a young black Republican who received strong backing from many national Republican leaders. The vote was 53%–47%.

==== 2002 ====
Bishop won reelection to a sixth term unopposed.

==== 2004 ====
Bishop won reelection to a seventh term with 67% of the vote.

==== 2006 ====
He won reelection to an eighth term with 68% of the vote.

==== 2008 ====
Bishop won reelection to a ninth term with 69% of the vote.

==== 2010 ====
Bishop won reelection to a tenth term against Republican State Representative Mike Keown, 51%–49%, the closest margin of his career. In a year where the Democrats lost the majority in the House, The New York Times wrote that Bishop's reelection odds seemed slim because he was an "incumbent in an anti-Washington year", because he was a black man in a majority white district (49% White, 47% Black), and because of a scholarship scandal at his nonprofit.

==== 2012 ====
After redistricting, the 2nd district became a black-majority district. Notably, it added most of Macon, previously the heart of the 8th district. Bishop was heavily favored in the general election as a result. He defeated Republican John House with 63% of the vote, winning an eleventh term in Congress.

==== 2014 ====
Bishop ran for a twelfth term and defeated Republican Greg Duke in the general election, winning 59.1% of the vote.

==== 2016 ====
Bishop ran for a thirteenth term and defeated Republican Greg Duke for a second time in the general election, this time winning 61.2% of the vote.

==== 2018 ====
Bishop ran for a fourteenth term and defeated Republican Herman West Jr. in the general election, winning 59.6% of the vote.

==== 2020 ====
Bishop ran for a fifteenth term and defeated Republican Don Cole in the general election, winning 59.1% of the vote.

==== 2022 ====
Bishop ran for a sixteenth term and defeated Republican Chris West in the general election, winning 55% of the vote.

==== 2024 ====
Bishop ran for a seventeenth term and defeated Republican Wayne Johnson in the general election, winning 56.3% of the vote.

=== Tenure ===
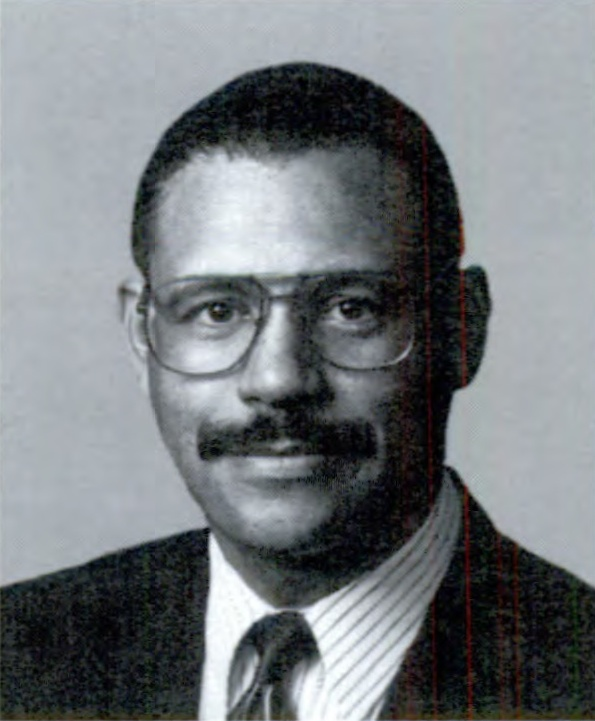
Bishop during the 103rd Congress c. 1993

Bishop is a member of the Congressional Black Caucus, as well as the Blue Dog Democrats, a group of moderate to conservative House Democrats. Because of his willingness to work across the aisle, Bishop was ranked the 16th most bipartisan member of the 114th Congress. The ranking was part of the Bipartisan Index put forth by The Lugar Center in collaboration with Georgetown University. As of 2022, Bishop has voted with President Joe Biden 100% of the time, according to FiveThirtyEight.

Serving a primarily agricultural district, Bishop has fought to preserve the federal price supports for peanuts, southwest Georgia's most important crop. The New York Times quoted the chairman of the agency that administers federal farm programs in Georgia as saying, "It's questionable whether it would have survived without the votes [Bishop] brought to it". In 1997, Bishop caused considerable controversy within his own party by cosponsoring a bill by Representative Ernest Istook to introduce a constitutional amendment to protect religious expression on public property, known as the H. J. Res, 78, the Religious Freedom Amendment. The wording of the amendment allowing the practice of religion on public property, most notably public schools:

To secure the people's fight to acknowledge God according to the dictates of conscience: The people's right to pray and to recognize their religious beliefs, heritage and traditions shall not be infringed. The Government shall not require any person to join in prayer or other religious activity, prescribe school prayers, discriminate against religion, or deny equal access to a benefit on account of religion ... The people's right to pray and to recognize their religious beliefs, heritage, or traditions on public property, including schools, shall not be infringed.

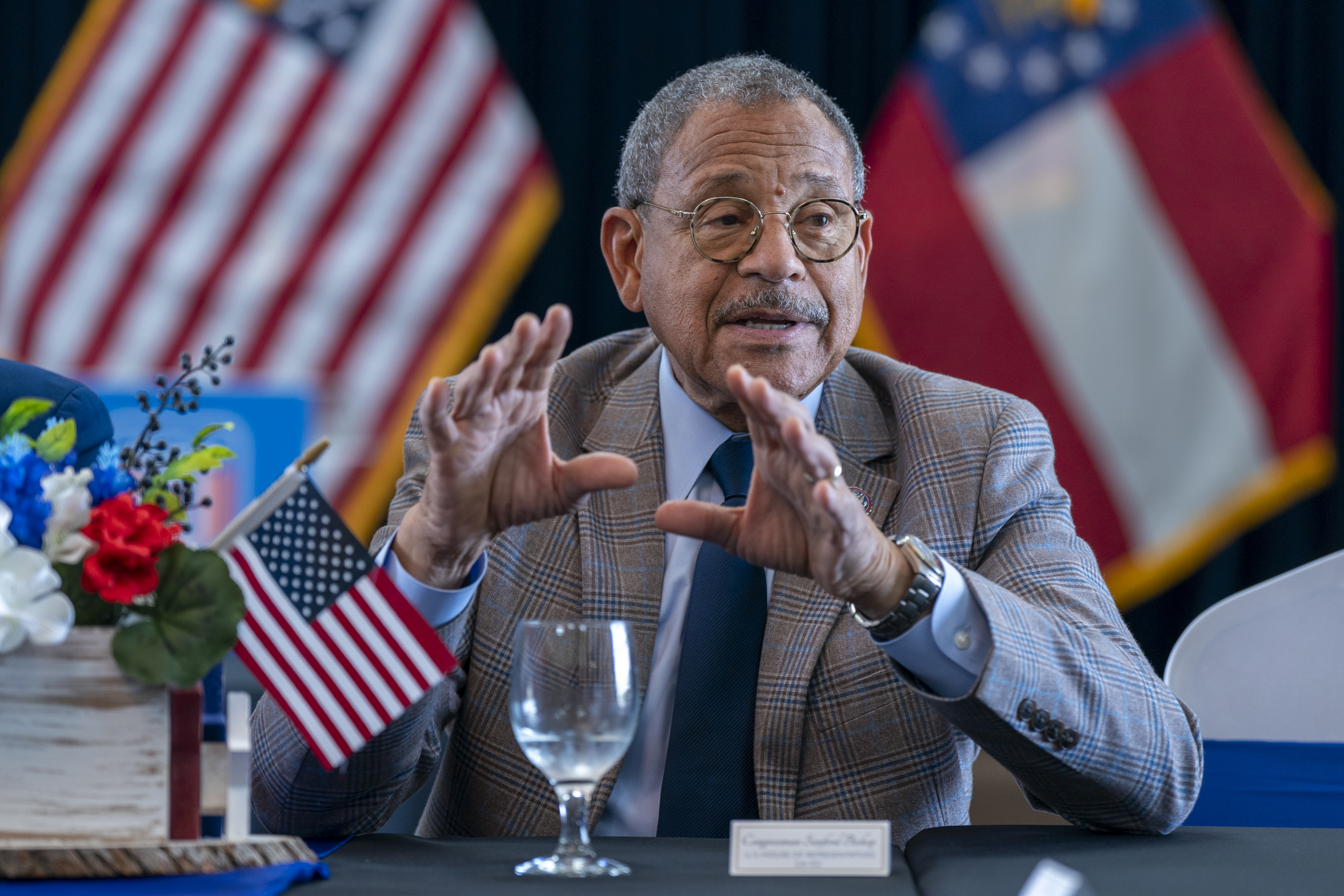
Bishop speaks in 2024

On October 10, 2002, Bishop was one of only four of 36 Congressional Black Caucus members to vote for the joint resolution authorizing the Iraq War. The other three Congressional Black Caucus members who voted for the resolution are no longer members of Congress: Bill Jefferson, Albert Wynn, and Harold Ford Jr.

On September 10, 2007, Bishop endorsed Barack Obama for President and co-chaired the Georgia for Obama campaign; his wife, Vivian Creighton Bishop, a municipal court clerk in Columbus, co-chaired the Georgia Women for Hillary committee.

Bishop serves on the House Appropriations Committee, and chairs the Subcommittee on Agriculture, Rural Development, Food and Drug Administration, and Related Agencies.

Bishop voted to provide Israel with funding in the 2023 Gaza-Israel conflict.

In 2025, Bishop was one of 46 House Democrats who joined all Republicans to vote for the Laken Riley Act.

=== Controversies ===
In September 2010, the Associated Press reported that Bishop had, between 2003 and 2005, directed scholarships and awards funded by the Congressional Black Caucus to ineligible persons, including his stepdaughter, Aayesha Owens Reese; his niece, Emmaundia J. Whitaker; and other people with close ties to his family, threatening to turn the program into a political problem for the party. Ashton McRae released a statement by Bishop's office: "It is our understanding that the CBC Foundation in 2008 revisited the guidelines and processes for its scholarship programs, and as such, included language to clarify that CBC family members are not eligible to receive the scholarships. These scholarships ... were awarded prior to 2008." Ultimately Bishop's spokesman said he would repay the scholarship fund for any awards he made in violation of the rules. Citizens for Responsibility and Ethics in Washington mentioned Bishop in its annual Most Corrupt Members of Congress report in 2011.

In 1997, the Pigford v. Glickman lawsuit came out of legislative discrimination against black farmers. The case was led by Timothy Pigford and 400 black farmers. The Washington Times reported that by the end of the case in 1999, over 94,000 claims were filed in conjunction with the original case, "even though the U.S. Census Bureau never counted more than 33,000 black farmers in America during the years in question." In February 2011, three farmers brought allegations of fraud to Bishop, including Eddie Slaughter, vice president of the Black Farmers and Agriculturalists Association. Bishop told The Albany Herald that he was aware of fraud in the program, but that the settlement's anti-fraud provisions would prevent disbursement of funds to those who didn't qualify. Interviews with Slaughter have circulated online and criticism has been raised about his comments about fraud allegations leading to the end of the program.

In 2020, the Office of Congressional Ethics released a report alleging Bishop misused over $90,000 of campaign funds to cover personal expenses like fuel, golf expenses, meals, travel, tuition and entertainment. A full House Ethics Committee investigation was subsequently launched.

=== Committee assignments ===
For the 119th Congress:

- Committee on Appropriations
  - Subcommittee on Agriculture, Rural Development, Food and Drug Administration, and Related Agencies (Ranking Member)
  - Subcommittee on Financial Services and General Government
  - Subcommittee on Military Construction, Veterans Affairs, and Related Agencies

=== Caucus memberships ===
- Black Maternal Health Caucus
- Congressional Black Caucus
- Congressional Taiwan Caucus
- BIOTech Caucus
- Blue Dog Coalition
- Congressional Diabetes Caucus
- International Conservation Caucus
- Sportsmen's Caucus
- Congressional Cement Caucus
- Rare Disease Caucus
- United States Congressional International Conservation Caucus
- U.S.-Japan Caucus

== Electoral history ==
Georgia's 2nd congressional district general, 1992
Party	Candidate	Votes	%
Democratic	Sanford Bishop	95,789	63.70
Republican	Jim Dudley	54,593	36.30
Total votes		150,382	100.0

Georgia's 2nd congressional district general election, 1994
Party	Candidate	Votes	%
Democratic	Sanford Bishop (incumbent)	65,383	66.17
Republican	John Clayton	33,429	33.83
Total votes		98,812	100.0

Georgia's 2nd congressional district Democratic primary, 1996
Party	Candidate	Votes	%
Democratic	Sanford Bishop (incumbent)	56,660	59.40
Democratic	W.T. Gamble III	31,615	33.14
Democratic	Walter H. Lewis	7,116	7.46
Total votes		95,391	100.0

Georgia's 2nd congressional district general election, 1996
Party	Candidate	Votes	%
Democratic	Sanford Bishop (incumbent)	88,256	53.97
Republican	Darrel Ealum	75,282	46.03
Total votes		163,538	100.0

Georgia's 2nd congressional district general election, 1998
Party	Candidate	Votes	%
Democratic	Sanford Bishop (incumbent)	77,953	56.8
Republican	Joseph F. McCormick	59,305	43.2
Total votes		137,258	100.0

Georgia's 2nd congressional district general election, 2000
Party	Candidate	Votes	%
Democratic	Sanford Bishop (incumbent)	96,430	53.5
Republican	Dylan Glenn	83,870	46.5
Total votes		180,300	100.0

Georgia's 2nd congressional district general election, 2004
Party	Candidate	Votes	%
Democratic	Sanford Bishop (incumbent)	129,984	66.79
Republican	Dave Eversman	64,645	33.21
Total votes		194,629	100.0

Georgia's 2nd Congressional District Election (2006)
Party	Candidate	Votes	%
Democratic	Sanford Bishop*	88,662	67.87
Republican	Bradley Hughes	41,967	32.13
Total votes		130,629	100.00
Turnout			
Democratic hold			

Georgia's 2nd Congressional District Election (2008)
Party	Candidate	Votes	%
Democratic	Sanford Bishop*	158,447	68.95
Republican	Lee Ferrell	71,357	31.05
Total votes		229,804	100.00
Turnout			
Democratic hold			

Georgia's 2nd Congressional District Election (2010)
Party	Candidate	Votes	%
Democratic	Sanford Bishop*	86,520	51.44
Republican	Mike Keown	81,673	48.56
Total votes		168,193	100.00
Turnout			
Democratic hold			

Georgia 2nd Congressional District Election (2012)
Party	Candidate	Votes	%
Democratic	Sanford Bishop*	162,751	63.78
Republican	John House	92,410	36.78
Total votes		255,161	100
Democratic hold			

Georgia's 2nd Congressional District Election (2014)
Party	Candidate	Votes	%
Democratic	Sanford Bishop*	96,363	59.15
Republican	Greg Duke	66,357	40.85
Total votes		162,720	100.00
Democratic hold			

Georgia's 2nd Congressional District Election (2016)
Party	Candidate	Votes	%
Democratic	Sanford Bishop*	148,543	61.23
Republican	Greg Duke	94,056	38.77
Total votes		242,599	100.00
Democratic hold			

Georgia's 2nd Congressional District Election (2018)
Party	Candidate	Votes	%
Democratic	Sanford Bishop*	135,709	59.56
Republican	Herman West Jr.	92,132	40.44
Total votes		227,841	100.00
Democratic hold			

Georgia's 2nd Congressional District Election (2020)
Party	Candidate	Votes	%
Democratic	Sanford Bishop*	161,397	59.12
Republican	Don Cole	111,620	40.88
Total votes		273,017	100.00
Democratic hold			

Georgia's 2nd Congressional District Election (2022)
Party	Candidate	Votes	%
Democratic	Sanford Bishop*	132,675	54.97
Republican	Chris West	108,665	45.03
Total votes		241,340	100.00
Democratic hold			

Georgia's 2nd Congressional District Election (2024)
Party	Candidate	Votes	%
Democratic	Sanford Bishop*	176,028	56.33
Republican	A. Wayne Johnson	136,473	43.67
Total votes		312,501	100.00
Democratic hold			

== Honors ==
- 2015 - Bishop was appointed as a Member of the Most Venerable Order of the Hospital of Saint John of Jerusalem by Queen Elizabeth II of the United Kingdom.

== See also ==
- List of African-American United States representatives

U.S. House of Representatives
Preceded by Charles Hatcher	Member of the U.S. House of Representatives from Georgia's 2nd congressional district 1993–present	Incumbent
U.S. order of precedence (ceremonial)
Preceded by Jerry Nadler	United States representatives by seniority 11th	Succeeded by Ken Calvert
Preceded by Jerry Nadler	Order of precedence of the United States	Succeeded by Jim Clyburn
