= Berkeley Systems =

Defunct American software company

- Type: Private
- Founded: 1987; 39 years ago in Berkeley, California, United States
- Founder: Wes Boyd; Joan Blades
- Defunct: 2000
- Fate: Acquired
- Headquarters: Berkeley, California, United States
- Products: Accessible computing software Screensaver software Computer games
- Owner: Wes Boyd; Joan Blades
- Number of employees: 120 (1997)
- Parent: Sierra On-Line (1997–2000)
- Subsidiaries: Access Software

Berkeley Systems was a San Francisco Bay Area-based software company co-founded in 1987 by Wes Boyd and Joan Blades. It made money early on by performing contract work for the National Institutes of Health, specifically in making modifications to the Macintosh so that it could be used by partially sighted or blind people. Several of these Access programs were licensed by Apple Computer and added to the operating system. Perhaps the most ambitious of these technologies was a program that could read the Macintosh screen, called outSPOKEN, which won a technology award from the Smithsonian in 1990.

The first commercial success for Berkeley Systems was a virtual desktop product for the Macintosh called Stepping Out. Given the small size of the first Macintosh screens, this product had some use and the idea was widely copied. Another of their initial products was inLARGE, which magnified the screen image to help users with poor eyesight.

The much bigger success was After Dark, a modular screen saver that included flying toasters, and the first of its kind to be sold. The idea was brought to Berkeley Systems by Jack Eastman and Patrick Beard. Eastman was later put in charge of software development at Berkeley Systems.

Berkeley Systems' best-selling product, the trivia game You Don't Know Jack, was developed by Jellyvision, based on their award-winning children's educational film The Mind's Treasure Chest. You Don't Know Jack brought that program's model of interactive learning, engaging structure and pacing, and host character into the commercial mainstream. It also brought graphics, sound editing, and marketing to Berkeley; production of the show continued at Jellyvision's Chicago studios.

They also made other original and licensed software products:

- Launch Pad, a desktop replacement for kids.
- Expresso Calendar and Address Book, and the Star Trek inspired version, Star Date.
- Triazzle, based on the puzzles of Dan Gilbert.
- What's the Big Idea?, an online game where 100 players try attain the most IQ points.
- Screen savers based on Star Trek, The Simpsons, and Looney Tunes, among others.

Based in the old Pacific Bell building on Rose Street at Shattuck Avenue in Berkeley, California, Berkeley Systems grew to 120 employees and US$30 million annual revenue before it was acquired by the Sierra On-Line division of CUC International in 1997 for $13.8 million. Vivendi Universal’s subsequent acquisition of Sierra, and a host of similar enterprises, enjoined diverse competing sales and marketing departments with one sole directive: sell Web banner advertisements. As a result, Berkeley Systems became the U.S. headquarters of French-owned Flipside.com. In early 2000, Berkeley Systems was folded into the fledgling Los Angeles–based gambling site iWin.com, per the terms of that site's acquisition by Vivendi.

The flying toasters were the subject of two lawsuits, the first in 1993, Berkeley Systems vs Delrina Corporation, over a module of Delrina's Opus 'N Bill screen saver in which Opus the Penguin shoots down the toasters. Delrina later changed the wings of the toasters to propellers in order to avoid infringing the trademark. The second case was brought in 1994 by the 1960s rock group Jefferson Airplane who claimed that the toasters were a copy of the winged toasters featured on the cover of their 1973 album Thirty Seconds Over Winterland. The case was dismissed, because the cover art had not been registered as a trademark by the group prior to Berkeley Systems' release of the screen saver.

Boyd and Blades went on to found the liberal political group MoveOn.org in 1998. Blades also later co-founded MomsRising.org with Kristin Rowe-Finkbeiner in 2006.
