= MoveOn =

American grassroots progressive campaigning community

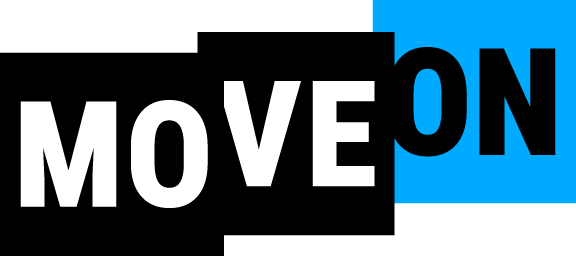
- Formation: 1998; 28 years ago
- Registration no.: 61553389 a 501(c)4 C00341396 a Hybrid PAC
- Executive Director: Katie Bethell
- Website: moveon.org

MoveOn (formerly known as MoveOn.org) is a progressive public policy advocacy group and political action committee. Formed in 1998 around one of the first massively viral email petitions, MoveOn has since grown into one of the largest and most impactful grassroots progressive campaigning communities in the United States, with a membership of millions. MoveOn did not endorse a candidate during the 2020 presidential primary campaign; it then endorsed and actively supported Joe Biden in the general election. MoveOn endorsed Kamala Harris, then vice president of the United States, as the Democratic Party nominee for president in the 2024 presidential election. Katie Bethell has been Executive Director of MoveOn Civic Action and MoveOn Political Action since July 2025, replacing Rahna Epting.

== Structure ==
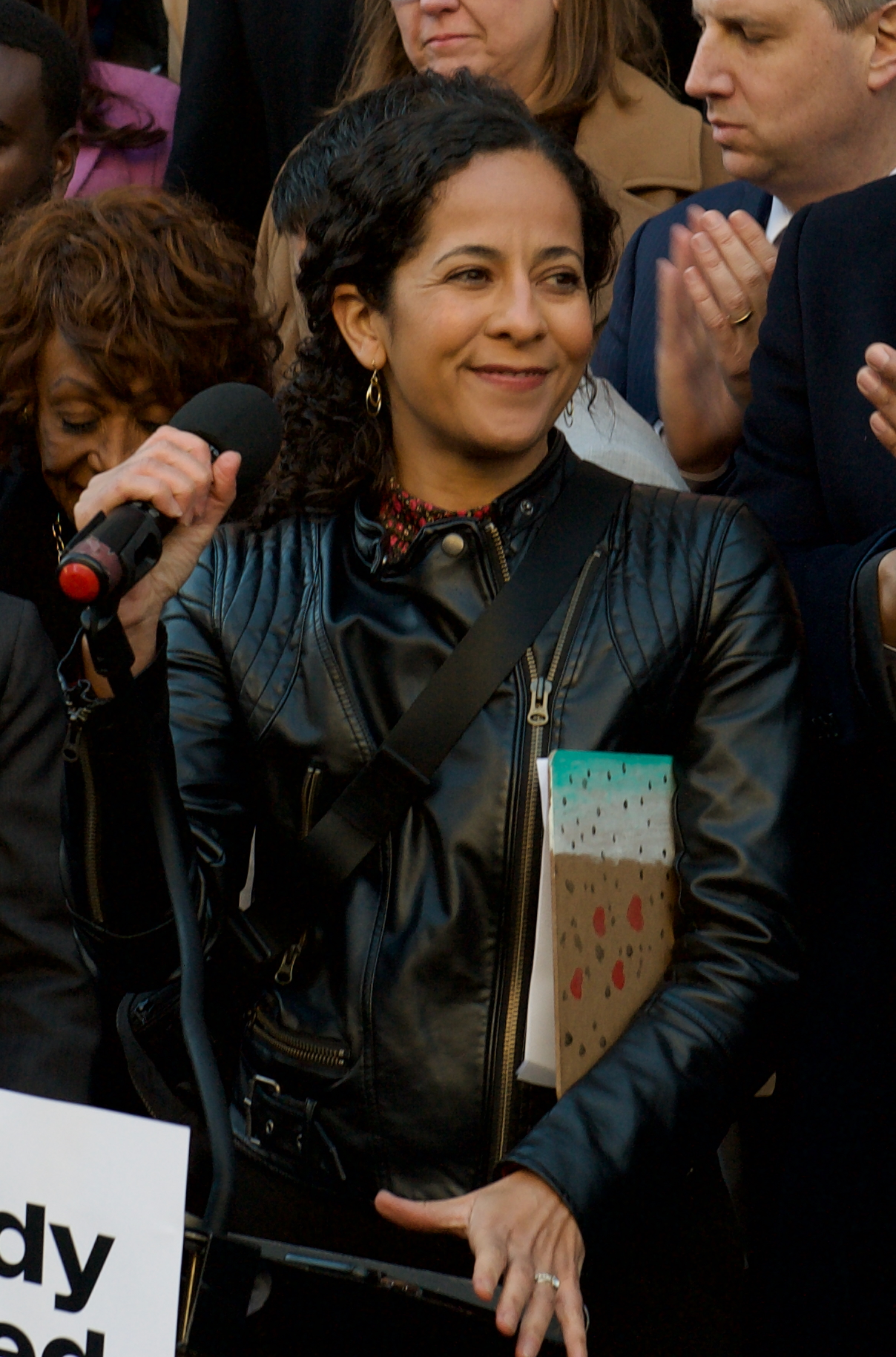
Rahna Epting, in February 2025

MoveOn comprises two legal entities, organized under different sections of U.S. tax and election laws. MoveOn.org Civic Action is a 501(c)(4) nonprofit corporation, and was formerly called MoveOn.org. It focuses on education and advocacy on national issues. MoveOn.org Political Action is a federal political action committee, and was formerly known as MoveOn PAC. It conducts a wide range of activities directly, and also contributes to the campaigns of many candidates across the country. MoveOn describes the legal structure of the Civic Action as that of "a California nonprofit public-benefit corporation" and the structure of MoveOn.org Political Action as that of "a California nonprofit mutual benefit corporation," and refers to both corporations collectively as "MoveOn".

On January 17, 2019, MoveOn announced that executive directors Anna Galland and Ilya Sheyman were departing in 2019 after 6 years of serving as co-executive directors from 2013 to 2019. On May 29, 2019, MoveOn further announced that its next executive director would be Rahna Epting. Her appointment took effect during the week of October 14, 2019. The president of MoveOn Civic Action's board is former executive director Anna Galland. Past board members include co-founders Joan Blades, Wes Boyd, former executive director Eli Pariser, former executive director Justin Ruben, and former Chief Operating Officer Carrie Olson.

== History ==
MoveOn started in 1998 as an e-mail group, MoveOn.org, created by software entrepreneurs Joan Blades and Wes Boyd, the married cofounders of Berkeley Systems. They started by passing around a petition asking Congress to "Censure President Clinton and Move On to Pressing Issues Facing the Nation", as opposed to impeaching him. The one-sentence petition, passed around by email, gathered half a million signatures, making it one of the first "viral" email-based petitions. It did not manage to dissuade the House of Representatives from impeaching the president. The couple went on to start similar campaigns calling for arms inspections rather than an invasion of Iraq, and campaign finance reform.

=== Opposing Clinton's impeachment ===
The MoveOn.org domain name was registered on September 18, 1998, following the September 11, 1998, release of the Independent Counsel Starr Report. The MoveOn website was launched initially to oppose the Republican-led effort to impeach Clinton. Initially called "Censure and Move On", it invited visitors to add their names to an online petition stating that "Congress must Immediately Censure President Clinton and Move On to pressing issues facing the country."

The founders were computer entrepreneurs Joan Blades and Wes Boyd, the married cofounders of Berkeley Systems, an entertainment software company known for the flying toaster screen saver and the popular video game series You Don't Know Jack. After selling the company in 1997, Blades and Boyd became concerned about the level of "partisan warfare in Washington" following revelations of President Bill Clinton's affair with Monica Lewinsky.

At the time of MoveOn's public launch on September 24, it appeared likely that its petition would be dwarfed by the effort to oust Clinton. A reporter who interviewed Blades on the day after the launch wrote, "A quick search on Yahoo turns up no sites for 'censure Clinton' but 20 sites for 'impeach Clinton,'" adding that Scott Lauf's impeachclinton.org website had already delivered 60,000 petitions to Congress. Salon.com reported that Arianna Huffington, then a right-wing commentator, had collected 13,303 names on her website, resignation.com, which called on Clinton to resign.

Within a week, support for MoveOn had grown. Blades called herself an "accidental activist" and said: "We put together a one-sentence petition. ... We sent it to under a hundred of our friends and family, and within a week we had a hundred thousand people sign the petition. At that point, we thought it was going to be a flash campaign, that we would help everyone connect with leadership in all the ways we could figure out, and then get back to our regular lives. A half a million people ultimately signed and we somehow never got back to our regular lives." MoveOn also recruited 2,000 volunteers to deliver the petitions in person to members of the House of Representatives in 219 districts across America, and directed 30,000 phone calls to district offices.

According to Blades, "Then two weeks after the November 1998 election, Congress went ahead and voted to impeach. When you become active in the system and communicate to your representatives, and they don't vote in accordance with your values, your next responsibility is to support candidates who will. All of a sudden we were signed up until 2000." In response to the impeachment vote, MoveOn launched a "We will remember" campaign, asking its members to sign a pledge that "we will work to defeat Members of Congress who voted for impeachment or removal. To give substance to this pledge, we are also pledging, today, our maximum possible dollar contribution to opposing candidates in the year 2000."

In early 1999, MoveOn continued to pursue a bipartisan appeal, recruiting GOP moderate Larry Rockefeller, a New York environmental attorney and heir to the Rockefeller fortune, as the public face of a "Republican Move On" aimed at mobilizing anti-impeachment Republicans. As the 2000 elections neared, however, the organization gravitated toward the Democratic Party. 1999 also marked MoveOn's first foray into issues other than Clinton's impeachment. Following the shootings at Columbine High School near Littleton, Colorado, Blades and Boyd launched a "Gun Safety First" petition to promote the "common sense regulation of firearms", such as child safety standards for gun manufacturers and laws forcing gun-show operators to enact more-stringent background checks on buyers.

=== Creation of MoveOn PAC ===
In June 1999, MoveOn established its own political action committee, the MoveOn PAC, with the ability to accept contributions online via credit card. It was not the first organization to fundraise online for political candidates, but its success was unprecedented, raising $250,000 in its first five days of operation and $2 million over the course of the 2000 election to help elect four new Senators and five new House members. "That may not seem like a lot of money to most people, but it was a revolution in fundraising for campaigns from average citizens," Blades said. According to Michael Cornfield, director of the Democracy On Line Project at George Washington University, MoveOn's achievement created "a change in attitude" in the political fundraising community. "It is like a bell has gone off," he said. "The race is on. 'Let's raise money online.'" He compared MoveOn's achievement with the pioneering of direct-mail fundraising in the 1970s by conservative fundraisers such as Richard Viguerie.

The most significant innovation was MoveOn's success at raising funds from small donors, with an average contribution size of $35. Prior to the Internet, small-donor fundraising was prohibitively expensive, as costs of printing and postage ate up most of the money raised. By comparison, MoveOn's fundraising costs were minimal, with credit card transaction fees constituting their biggest expense. "If candidates can use the Internet to raise significant funds through small donations and attract and organize volunteers at relatively little cost and labor, it could radically alter the balance of power in politics," observed political reporter Joan Loawy. "Suddenly candidates with fewer resources are more viable and the clout of moneyed special interests is diminished."

The $2 million that MoveOn raised, however, was substantially less than the $13 million that its members had pledged they would give to defeat Republicans when passions were running high over the Clinton impeachment. According to Mike Fraioli, a Washington-based fundraiser for Democratic candidates, MoveOn missed an opportunity by waiting until the impeachment hearings were over before it began trying to collect campaign contributions. "Never let your pledges hang out there," Fraoli said. "Things change, the world changes. All the emotion that existed a year ago no longer exists today."

The 2000 elections also saw MoveOn's first effort at web-based voter registration with the launch of votepledge.org. It also weighted in regarding the 2000 presidential election, warning its members that voting for Ralph Nader could throw the election to George W. Bush. "Many (Nader supporters) say they never got into the race to play the spoiler," said an email message from Wes Boyd. "What was positioned as a safe protest vote has now become a kind of kamikaze vote."

=== Development of ActionForum.com ===
In January 2000, MoveOn rolled out ActionForum.com, an Internet discussion forum designed to solicit public involvement in policymaking. "Unlike most chat rooms, in which the loudest voices often rule, the site allows members to rank the comments they respect," explained the Contra Costa Times. "Those with the highest rankings move to the top. ... ActionForum aims to be an Internet chat room with accountability. In a typical chat room, users sign on anonymously. On ActionForum, users are required to address their letters with their real names, as well as their profession and city of residence." As a test subject for the new chat form, Blades and Boyd chose one of the most controversial issues for 2000 in their hometown of Berkeley, California: a draft revision of the Berkeley General Plan, a document that aims to set the city's goals for everything from zoning laws to transportation, housing and community safety. The forum was initially greeted with enthusiasm by city government officials as an online means of soliciting community feedback. Blades and Boyd also supported the Berkeley Party, which attempted to build a political platform for the city centered around the ActionForum, with "no back room deals, no insiders," making it "unlike another political party in the world." The ActionForum.com never really caught on with Berkeley residents, and efforts to use it for municipal purposes were abandoned in 2001. In the meantime, however, it became an important vehicle through which MoveOn received advice and suggestions from its own members.

In March 2001, MoveOn joined forces with the nonprofit advocacy site Generation Net, an online advocacy organization headed by Peter Schurman. He became MoveOn's first full-time, salaried executive director, taking on administrative tasks that until then had been performed on a volunteer basis by Blades and Boyd. Issues prioritized by MoveOn in 2001 included support for the McCain-Feingold campaign-finance reform bill, environmental protection and opposition to the Bush administration's proposal to abolish estate taxes for the wealthy. MoveOn also responded to electrical blackouts and skyrocketing energy costs in California by calling for cost controls on electricity utility companies, organizing a nationwide "roll your own energy blackout" - a voluntary, three-hour electricity-free evening on June 21, in which more than 10,000 participants turned out lights and unplugged TVs and other appliances to protest Bush's energy plan.

=== Anti-war organizing ===
Following the terrorist attacks of September 11, 2001, MoveOn launched an online campaign calling for "justice, not escalating violence." It collected 30,000 signers for a statement that argued: "To combat terrorism, we must act in accordance with a high standard that does not disregard the lives of people in other countries. If we retaliate by bombing Kabul and kill people oppressed by the Taliban dictatorship who have no part in deciding whether terrorists are harbored, we become like the terrorists we oppose. We perpetuate the cycle of retribution and recruit more terrorists by creating martyrs." Eventually, this led to them working on behalf of Eli Pariser's similar 9-11peace.org petition. Pariser later joined MoveOn as its executive director. This led to a period of substantial growth and increased visibility for the organization.

During the buildup to the invasion of Iraq, MoveOn began running a multi-front campaign opposing the war. Activities included anti-war petitions calling for "No War on Iraq". In July 2002, Executive Director Eli Pariser urged its members to oppose the war by sending letters to the editor of their local newspapers, offering sample form letters that members could use. Several of these form-based letters were printed in newspapers including the St. Petersburg Times, the Claremont Courier, and the Times Herald-Record of Middletown, NY.

On August 17, 2002, MoveOn launched an online petition against the war, collecting 220,000 signatures in two months. As it had done with the petition against Clinton's impeachment, it organized volunteers who hand-delivered the signatures to senators and representatives before the congressional vote on the war powers resolution. In October 2002, a MoveOn fundraising appeal raised $1 million in two days' time for what it called four "heroes of the anti-war effort" in Congress who opposed the Iraq resolution: Senator Paul Wellstone of Minnesota, representatives Rick Larsen and Jay Inslee of Washington, and Representative Rush D. Holt Jr. of New Jersey. However, MoveOn also worked to raise money for Democratic candidates who supported the Iraq resolution, some of whom were locked in tight races in moderate or conservative states, including Senator Jean Carnahan of Missouri, and Senate candidates Ron Kirk in Texas, Jeanne Shaheen in New Hampshire, Tim Johnson in South Dakota and Mark Pryor in Arkansas. All told, it raised $3.5 million for the 2002 election cycle.

In September 2002, it issued a bulletin by Susan Thompson, "Selling the War on Iraq", offering "lessons in PR from previous wars" and warning that "the costs of regime change" would "cost a whopping $200 billion". MoveOn predicted that "regular people will probably have to foot the bill" while anyone with ties to the oil companies will probably profit immensely."

MoveOn also joined with 14 other organization to form the Win Without War coalition, which also included the National Council of Churches, the National Association for the Advancement of Colored People, and the National Organization for Women. Win Without War in turn helped organize Artists United to Win Without War, a group of more than 100 anti-war actors, producers and directors from Hollywood. In December 2002, MoveOn launched another petition, titled "Let the Inspections Work", with the goal of raising $40,000 to pay for a full-page anti-war appeal in the New York Times. Instead, its members sent in nearly $400,000. With the additional funds, it sponsored anti-war radio spots and TV ads in 13 major cities. Modeled after the famous "Daisy" ad from Lyndon B. Johnson's 1964 presidential campaign against Barry Goldwater, the TV ads warned that war with Iraq could spark nuclear armageddon. According to an account in the Los Angeles Times, "To generate buzz - essentially free advertising - for its own antiwar television spot, MoveOn.org hired Fenton Communications, the same company that promoted Arianna Huffington's recent anti-SUV ads. ... A week after its TV ad first appeared on the news, MoveOn.org reported that its membership had grown by 100,000. The ad was covered on virtually every major network. It was shown and discussed on news programs in Australia, Pakistan, Russia and Japan. The tally is ongoing, but the ad generated at least 110 television news stories and dozens in print, according to an Interim Media Coverage Report by Fenton Communications." It also attempted to place anti-war advertisements on the sides of buildings, billboards and buses but was thwarted when Viacom, which owns the largest outdoor-advertising entity in North America, refused to run the ads.

By early 2003, MoveOn boasted more than 750,000 members in the United States and hundreds of thousands more overseas. As war in Iraq neared, its member base grew and the pace of its activities accelerated. Whereas the Nexis/Lexis news database recorded 155 mentions of MoveOn in 2002, in 2003 there were 2,226 mentions. In January 2003, more than 9,000 of its members, organized into small delegations, visited more than 400 home offices of U.S. senators and representatives across the nation to present the petitions in person. In February 2003, MoveOn teamed up with Win Without War to sponsor a "virtual march on Washington" that generated more than 1 million phone calls and faxes to politicians opposing the invasion.

In June 2003, two months after the Pentagon declared an end to "major combat operations in Iraq," MoveOn teamed up again with Win Without War to purchase a full-page ad in the New York Times that labeled Bush a misleader and demanded an independent commission to determine the truth about US intelligence on Iraq, declaring, "It would be a tragedy if young men and women were sent to die for a lie."

In 2007, MoveOn organized the anti-war lobbying coalition Americans Against Escalation in Iraq.

=== Virtual primary for the 2004 presidential election ===
On June 24, 2003, MoveOn held what it called "the first online primary of the modern age", and Howard Dean won a plurality of 44 percent of the vote, with 139,360 votes. The methodology of the primary, however, attracted criticism from a staff member of the Richard A. "Dick" Gephardt campaign, who complained of "vote-rigging" because only three of the Democratic primary candidates—Dean, John Kerry, and Dennis Kucinich—had been invited to send detailed messages to MoveOn members in advance of the online voting.

An opinion piece for the New York Times noted that MoveOn's "effort is more extensive than most—enthusiasts clicked on for the two-day primary that drew more than 300,000 voters. The virtual tally—results of which were not expected until today [Friday, June 27, 2003, at noon]—would top the combined turnouts in Iowa, New Hampshire and South Carolina in 2000.

There were complaints about some of MoveOn's electioneering strictures. After coming into being with an internet petition against President Bill Clinton's impeachment, MoveOn has become an electronic precinct machine, steadily attracting more than one million enrolled members with criticisms of the George W. Bush administration and quietly raising more than $7 million for Democratic candidates. If a contender can draw at least 50 percent in the elbow-throwing field, the result will mean a formal endorsement with money and volunteers to follow.

=== Take Back the White House Campaign ===
In April 2004, MoveOn organized a “Take Back the White House" campaign, which included 1,100 bake sales across the U.S., rallied 500,000 volunteers, and raised $750,000 for ads targeting Bush's military record.

=== Fahrenheit 9/11 ===
In June 2004, MoveOn organized a response to criticism of Michael Moore's controversial film, Fahrenheit 9/11, calling on its members to send supportive emails to movie theaters. More than 110,000 MoveOn members pledged to go see the film once it opened. According to MoveOn's Eli Pariser, its influence on moviegoer turnout may be even larger than that number suggests. "When I went to Waterville, Maine and asked how many people from MoveOn were there, probably three-quarters of the people there said yes," Pariser told Variety.

MoveOn also organized nearly 3,000 "Turn Up the Heat" house parties on the Monday following its first weekend in theaters. Attendees listened via Internet hookup and participated via a live online map-based town hall application in a 30-minute talk by Moore and MoveOn organizers, and then signed up to participate in voter-registration drives and other activities aimed at unseating Bush and other Republicans in the November 2004 U.S. elections.

=== 2006 "Call for Change" Campaign ===
In preparation for the 2006 midterm elections, MoveOn created a new system for soliciting potential voters named Call for Change. As part of the Call for Change effort, MoveOn reported that it placed over seven million phone calls to registered voters.

=== Facebook and Beacon ===
In November 2007, a drive spearheaded by MoveOn caused Facebook to change its controversial new Beacon program, which notified Facebook users about purchases by people on their friends list. The Facebook group "Petition: Facebook, stop invading my privacy!" had over 54,000 members at the time the announcement was made that Facebook was changing Beacon to an opt-in system.

=== 2008 presidential endorsement ===
On February 1, 2008, MoveOn announced it had endorsed Senator Barack Obama, rather than Senator Hillary Clinton, the former first lady, in the 2008 presidential election. MoveOn said it had never endorsed a presidential candidate before. MoveOn also launched a television advertisement critical of John McCain, Obama's Republican opponent for the presidency. The ad was titled "Not Alex" and featured a young mother telling McCain that she would not allow her young son to be sent to Iraq.

=== 2016 election efforts ===
==== Run Warren Run ====
In December 2014, MoveOn.org began their campaign to get Senator Elizabeth Warren to run to be the 45th president of the United States. MoveOn.org's plan to get Warren to run for office included getting their large base of supporters to sign a petition urging Warren to run, spending roughly a million dollars on television advertisements in Iowa and New Hampshire, the states that kicked off the presidential nomination process, and creating a website called "Run Warren Run". When asked about the "Run Warren Run" campaign, Ilya Sheyman, MoveOn.org's executive director, made it clear that the mindset behind the campaign was to show Warren that there was a path for her to the presidency and that there was a substantial amount of grass-roots energy in key states that would support her if she chose to do so. By the end of the campaign, MoveOn.org got 365,000 signatures showing support for Warren and had planned, organized, and executed over 400 events. In the end, Warren did not run for the 2016 presidency.

==== Support for Bernie Sanders ====
After failing to get Senator Warren to run for the presidency, MoveOn.org chose to back Senator Bernie Sanders (I-VT) after 78% of its membership voted in favor of him rather than Hillary Clinton or Martin O'Malley. Ilya Sheyman claimed that Bernie Sanders' consistent fortitude in regards to standing up to big money and corporate interests really resonated with their members.

Democratic candidates were invited to participate in an online forum, which involved the candidates answering questions submitted by MoveOn members via video. Sen. Bernie Sanders and former Maryland Gov. Martin O'Malley agreed.

MoveOn endorsed Senator Sanders for President of the United States after holding online elections in which 340,665 members reportedly cast their ballot. 78.6% of these supported the Junior Senator from Vermont, while 14.6% and 0.9% threw themselves behind Former Secretary of State Hillary Clinton and Former Maryland Governor Martin O'Malley, respectively.

==== United Against Hate ====
In response to the rhetoric of Donald Trump during the 2016 presidential election, MoveOn ran a general-election campaign in 2016 under the headline "United Against Hate" which hired dozens of organizers in key battleground states and utilized volunteer-to-voter contact, digital advertising, video production, and cultural organizing to try to affect the outcome of the election. Celebrity supporters of this effort included Shonda Rhimes, Kerry Washington, Julianne Moore, Macklemore, and Neil Patrick Harris. It has taken credit for helping to promote the 2016 Donald Trump Chicago rally protest, and for paying for printing protest signs and a banner. The goal of the campaign was to stop Trump, whom MoveOn viewed as a "dangerous" and "divisive" leader. Trump went on to win the 2016 presidential election.

=== Organizing as part of the Anti-Trump Resistance ===
MoveOn organized its first protest of the Trump era on the day after the election in 2016, when it called for protests of "solidarity, resilience, and resolve," resulting in protests organized in under 24 hours in a number of cities. It was active in leading protests against the Trump agenda and Trump's rhetoric for all four years of his presidency, including pushing for his impeachment, working to block legislative priorities like the repeal of the Affordable Care Act, and defending the functions of democracy, including serving as one of the organizations most active in the Nobody Is Above The Law coalition, which organized grassroots events to press for the release of the Mueller report. MoveOn helped organize a range of grassroots mobilizations pushing back on Trump's actions, including the 2019 Presidents Day protest. MoveOn was one of the most active organizations in the anti-Trump movement.

==== 2018 "Families Belong Together" Mobilization ====
MoveOn was one of the leading organizations that called for and supported protests around the country in summer 2018 to respond to the Trump Administration's introduction of immigrant family separation at the US–Mexico border. In over 750 cities, ranging from very large cities to much smaller towns and rural areas, hundreds of thousands of people marched to protest the Trump Administration policy.

==== 2018 Midterm Election Program ====
MoveOn ran a major grassroots and digital campaign to influence the outcome of the 2018 midterms, and to help elect Democrats and defeat Republicans in order to flip the House. One signature program was Real Voter Voices, an effort aimed at persuading voters to cast their ballots for Democrats by collecting and distributing selfie videos made by MoveOn members all over the country. MoveOn was one of the top spenders on Facebook ads in the weeks running up to the 2018 election.

=== 2019 campaign to impeach Donald Trump ===
Following the April 2019 release of the Mueller report, the MoveOn website launched an initiative to support the Democrat-led effort to impeach Trump, saying "censure does not go far enough. It doesn't have any teeth to it." This position was notable because MoveOn was created to encourage congress to "move on" during the Clinton–Lewinsky scandal and not impeach President Clinton.

=== 2019 leadership change ===
On January 17, 2019, MoveOn announced that executive directors Anna Galland and Ilya Sheyman would depart in 2019 after 6 years of leadership.

On May 29, 2019, MoveOn further announced that its next executive director would be Rahna Epting, the first person of color to lead the organization. Born to African-American and Iranian parents, she has held senior roles in organizations including Service Employees International Union, Every Voice, Wellstone Action, and the Alliance For Youth Organizing. At MoveOn she held a number of senior roles in the 2 years leading to this appointment. On October 17, 2019, MoveOn announced that Epting has assumed the role of executive director.

=== 2020 election campaign ===
MoveOn's 2020 election campaign aimed to "Mobilize, Inspire, and Protect" the vote.

== Communication methods ==
MoveOn uses a wide range of methods to communicate with, organize, and mobilize its millions of members, including email, SMS messages, Twitter, Facebook, Instagram, videos distributed through various online platforms, and field organizing strategies including leadership training.

MoveOn has advertised in new and traditional media formats, with publicity strategies including billboards, digital ads, bus signs, and bumper stickers.

MoveOn has collaborated with groups in organizing street demonstrations, bake sales, house parties, and other opportunities.

Changes in federal election laws have impacted groups like MoveOn. The McCain–Feingold campaign finance reform legislation, which went into effect in 2002, allows political parties to raise larger amounts of "hard money" contributions, but bans unlimited "soft money" contributions to the national political parties and prohibits federal officeholders from soliciting soft money. MoveOn, like many other political organizations which sought to influence the 2004 election, was able to circumvent this legislation using a 527 group, which became inactive in 2005 and closed in 2008.

On May 16, 2011, MoveOn.org debuted SignOn.org, a non-profit hosting service for Internet petitions, and in 2013, SignOn.org became MoveOn Petitions.

== Model ==
=== Internationalization of the MoveOn model ===
From the start, MoveOn.org's model was able to combine net activism with meaningful political activism. As MoveOn.org developed its presence within politics into the one that it has today, the model and structure that they developed became desirable to other organizations who face similar challenges. One person who aided in the internationalization of the MoveOn Model is MoveOn.org's former advocacy director, Ben Brandzel. In 2007 after leaving MoveOn to work on John Edwards presidential campaign, Brandzel headed to Australia to help a young Internet driven group called GetUp! According to their website, GetUp! is "an independent movement to build a progressive Australia and bring participation back into [their] democracy." When Brandzel arrived in Australia to help GetUp!, he realized that GetUp! was facing similar opportunities and challenges to MoveOn.org. Brandzel then helped GetUp! implement similar structure and campaigns as MoveOn.org and they were able to achieve results at a rate that he says were "three times the pace of MoveOn in the U.S." From this, he concluded that the success MoveOn.org achieved was not a fluke, rather it was a model that could be applied to different scenarios and could help other organizations achieve similar results in regards to net and political activism. MoveOn.org's model helped shape and mold GetUp!'s organizational leadership in online campaigning, the communication within the organization, and their theory on how to create concrete political change.

== Criticism ==
MoveOn was criticized by the Anti-Defamation League, among others, when a member-submitted advertisement which drew parallels between President George W. Bush and Adolf Hitler was submitted to their online ad contest "Bush in 30 Seconds". The ad was part of an online MoveOn-sponsored contest during the 2004 presidential election in which members were invited to create and submit political ads challenging President Bush and his administration. The ad was quickly pulled off the website.

Fox News criticized the organization after it successfully encouraged the 2008 Democratic presidential candidates not to attend two debates sponsored by the network. Fox News advisor David Rhodes and the network's commentators Sean Hannity and Bill O'Reilly have also made accusations that MoveOn.org "owns" the Democratic Party and George Soros "owns" MoveOn.org.

Google and MoveOn have been accused of selective adherence to trademark law for removing ads from Google AdWords for Senator Susan Collins, citing infringement of MoveOn trademarks. Wired stated on October 15, 2007, that the "left-leaning political advocacy group, MoveOn.org, is backing down" and will allow Google to show the ads. MoveOn.org communications director Jennifer Lindenauer said: "We don't want to support a policy that denies people freedom of expression."

On June 17, 2008, MoveOn emailed its members stating that it had produced "the most effective TV ad we've ever created." The ad depicts a mother telling Republican senator and presumptive nominee John McCain that she will not let him use her infant son, Alex, as a soldier in the war in Iraq. Subsequent to the ad's release, Jon Stewart, host of The Daily Show, "praised" MoveOn for "10 years of making even people who agree with you cringe." The New York Times op-ed contributor Bill Kristol criticized the ad in an essay, including pointing out that the "United States has an all-volunteer Army. Alex won't be drafted, and his mommy can't enlist him. He can decide when he's an adult whether he wants to serve."

In 2020, several MoveOn staffers contributed to an article titled "Disinformation creep: ADOS and the strategic weaponization of breaking news" which incorrectly alleged that the subjects criticized in the article acted in ways that were "anti-Black", dismissive of the impact of COVID-19 on Black Americans, were tied to Russian disinformation efforts, and that they discouraged Black Americans from voting for Democratic candidates. The article was originally published in Harvard University's The Misinformation Review, but was retracted nearly a year later, after internal and external reviews found the article to have extensive misrepresentation of data and failure "to meet professional standards of validity and reliability".

=== David Petraeus advertising controversy ===
In 2007, MoveOn received bipartisan criticism for running a print ad in The New York Times that questioned the personal integrity of General David Petraeus, with headlines such as "General Petraeus or General Betray Us?" and "Cooking the Books for the White House". On September 20, 2007, the Senate passed an amendment by Republican John Cornyn of Texas designed to "strongly condemn personal attacks on the honor and integrity of General Petraeus". All 49 Republican senators, as well as 22 Democratic senators, voted in support. The House passed a similar resolution by a 341–79 vote on September 26, 2007.

On September 20, 2007, The Washington Post stated: "Democrats blamed the group Moveon.org for giving moderate Republicans a ready excuse for staying with Bush and for giving Bush and his supporters a way to divert attention away from the war."

The New York Times public editor Clark Hoyt later stated in an op-ed that MoveOn was mistakenly charged US$77,000 less for the ad than it should have been under Times policies, and MoveOn announced that it would pay The New York Times the difference in price.

MoveOn.org ran more ads using a "betrayal" theme, with TV spots targeting former President Bush and former Republican presidential candidate Rudy Giuliani. Giuliani ran his own full-page ad in The New York Times on September 14, 2007. Giuliani asked for and received a similar reduced fee as MoveOn.org, paying US$65,000.

== Fundraising ==
Since 1998, MoveOn has raised millions of dollars for many Democratic candidates. Once becoming the executive director, Rahna Epting stated MoveOn would spend $20 million "to defeat Donald Trump, end Republican control of the Senate, and help Democrats hold the majority in the House of Representatives." In a statement released by the organization, Epting said the funds would be used to "drive creative and cultural interventions" and combat "digital voter suppression online."

== See also ==
- Tea Party movement
