= Wes Boyd =

American software developer and political organizer

Wes Boyd (born c.1960) is an American software developer and political organizer. In 1987, he and his wife Joan Blades co-founded Berkeley Systems, a San Francisco Bay area software company. After selling the company in 1997, Boyd and Blades went on to found the liberal political group MoveOn.org in 1998.

== Early life and education ==
He was born in 1960. Native to Berkeley, California, he was active with computers at age 14, then later dropped out of college to pursue his interest in software design.

== Career ==
=== Berkeley Systems ===
He was a programmer at the University of California Berkeley for several years. Afterwards, he created software for PC users who were visually impaired.

In 1987 he founded Berkeley Systems with Joan Blades, with Boyd serving as technical expert and CEO.

In 1990, he was Berkeley Systems president, and had been working with Marc Sutton on software to aid sight-impaired computer users. It was also selling mass-market Mac utilities.

In the early 1990s, Boyd's popular screen saver bundle had brought in several millions of dollars. By the end of the 1990s, he left that business, and became politically active.

By the late 1990s, the company employed 150 people and made around $30 million a year in sales.

He sold the company to CUC International for $25 million in 1997.

=== MoveOn.org ===
He and his wife Joan Blades in 1998 founded MoveOn.org online. A one-sentence petition to move on from the Clinton scandal was first sent to several-hundred friends and family, and "very shortly" they had half a million people involved. The email involved a simple online submission form.

The site moveon.org appeared September 18, 1998 with the sole purpose of building a petition to express disapproval of Bill Clinton, call for a "quick censure" and move on to other issues. Boyd and Blades styled it as a "flash campaign."

When the signatures were collected, Boyd and Blades printed out 20,000 pages of email and had them hand-delivered to every member of the House of Congress. By 1999, the organization had raised $12 million in pledges to congressional campaigns of people who had not voted in favor of impeachment. It did so through the PAC MoveOn Political Action Committee. In 2000, the organization petitioned Ralph Nader to drop out of the 2000 presidential race so he wouldn't draw votes from Al Gore. In 2002, they supported Paul Wellstone.

In 2004, Boyd and Blades were named NPT Executives of the Year by the Nonprofit Times.

By 2008, it had an email list of 4.2 million names and had donated $118 million into political matters, such as "opposing U.S. involvement in the Iraq war, supporting an unregulated Internet and helping hurricane victims find temporary housing, among other activities. The group runs ads on television, on the Internet and in newspapers and magazines."

== Personal life ==
Boyd is married to Joan Blades, also his long-term business partner. They have two children and live in Berkeley.
