= Joan Blades =

American computer software entrepreneur, political activist, and author (born 1956)

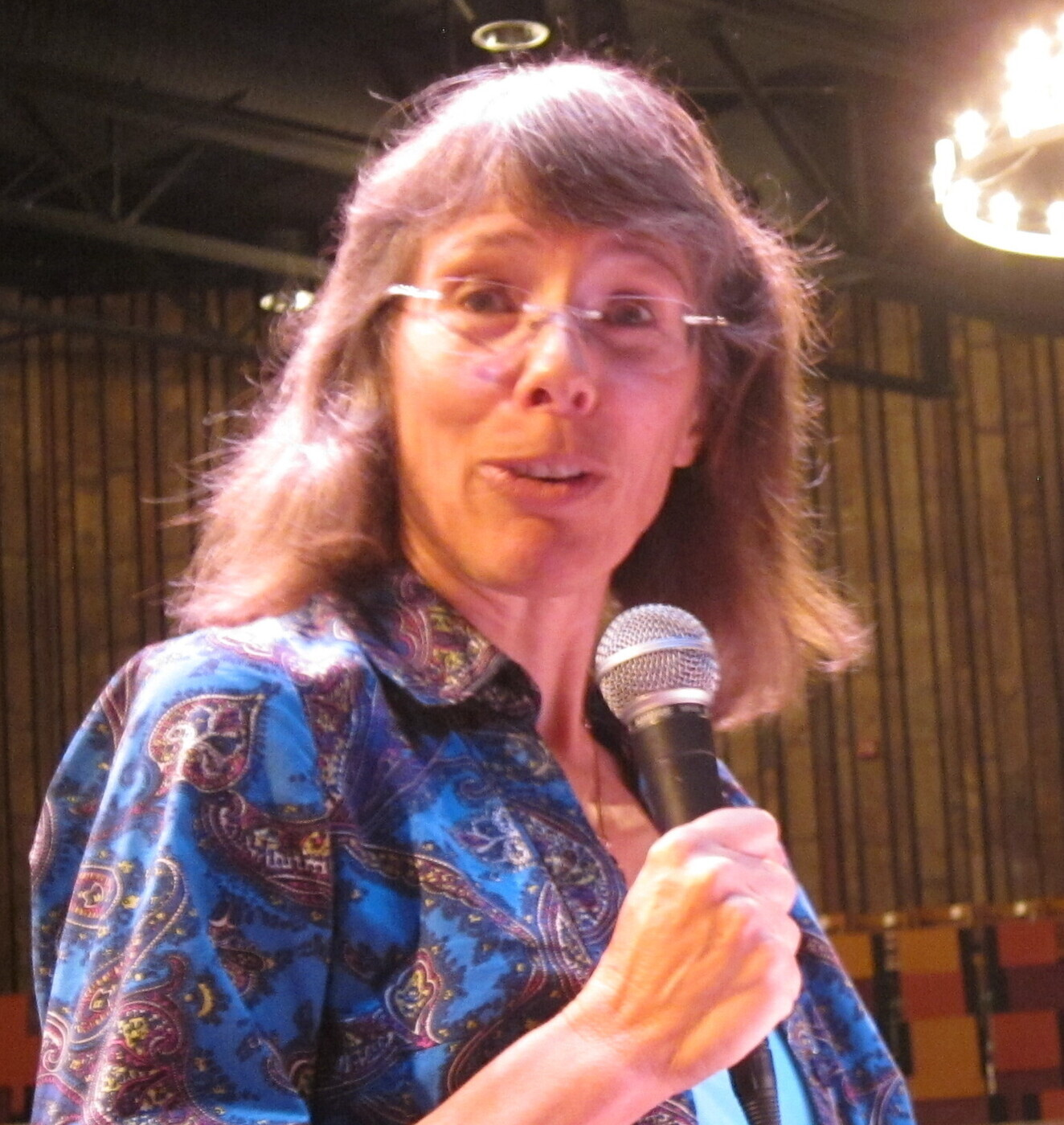
- Born: Joan Ellen Blades; March 18, 1956 (age 69); Berkeley, California, U.S.
- Education: University of California, Berkeley (BA); Golden Gate University (JD)
- Occupations: Businessperson, political activist
- Spouse: Wes Boyd

Joan Ellen Blades (born March 18, 1956) is an American computer software entrepreneur, political activist, and author. In 1987, she and her husband Wes Boyd co-founded Berkeley Systems, a San Francisco Bay area software company that marketed the popular After Dark screensaver and the You Don't Know Jack trivia game. After selling Berkeley Systems in 1997 for $13.8 million, Blades and Boyd founded the liberal political group MoveOn.org.

Blades received her B.A. in History from UC Berkeley in 1977 and her J.D. from the Golden Gate University School of Law. She wrote the book Mediate Your Divorce (published by Prentice Hall), and co-wrote The Divorce Book. She was a member of the board and vice president of marketing at Berkeley Systems. Blades created many of the box designs for the early Berkeley Systems products such as Stepping Out and After Dark, based on her original collage art.

In 2006, Blades and Kristin Rowe-Finkbeiner co-authored The Motherhood Manifesto and co-founded the organization MomsRising.org, dedicated to "bringing millions of people, who all share a common concern about the need to build a more family-friendly America, together as a non-partisan force."

In 2010, Blades and Nanette Fondas co-authored The Custom-Fit Workplace, published by Wiley. A practical guide for making the workplace more profitable and a better fit for employees, the book describes work practices like flexible work, virtual work, high-commitment work, non-linear career paths and babies at work. MomsRising.org launched a companion to the book on Labor Day 2010 to encourage supporters of custom-fit work environments to join the conversation about transforming work culture.

In 2011, Blades co-founded Living Room Conversations in an effort to bring both sides of the political spectrum together to discuss individual issues in a comfortable environment. Based on six basic rules of discourse, Blades hosted a Living Room Conversation with Tea Party Patriots co-founder Mark Meckler and was featured in the SF Chronicle. This led to further work on criminal justice reform and the formation of the Coalition for Public Safety. Dozens of Living Room Conversations topics are available for public use, ranging from food to guns to voting and more; they have been regularly featured in the Huffington Post.
